= List of members of the 9th Russian State Duma =

Members of the 9th Russian State Duma
| ← | 8th |

Overview
- Term: 30 September 2026 –
- Election: 18–20 September 2026
- Party control: United Russia

The 9th State Duma has 450 members. This sitting was elected at the 2026 Russian legislative election.

== By constituencies ==
Members of the State Duma
| Federal Subject | Constituency | Name | Party | Faction | Period |
|---|---|---|---|---|---|
| Adygea | Adygea | Vladislav Reznik | United Russia | United Russia | Since 30 September 2026 |
| Altai Republic | Altai | Alexander Surazov | United Russia | United Russia | Since 30 September 2026 |
| Bashkortostan | Ufa | Denis Chernavin | United Russia | United Russia | Since 30 September 2026 |
| Bashkortostan | Blagoveshchensk | Yulai Kidrasov | United Russia | United Russia | Since 30 September 2026 |
| Bashkortostan | Beloretsk | Elvira Aitkulova | United Russia | United Russia | Since 30 September 2026 |
| Bashkortostan | Neftekamsk | Alexey Zhuravlyov | Rodina | Unaffiliated | Since 30 September 2026 |
| Bashkortostan | Salavat | Zarif Baiguskarov | United Russia | United Russia | Since 30 September 2026 |
| Bashkortostan | Sterlitamak | Gulnur Kulsarina | United Russia | United Russia | Since 30 September 2026 |
| Buryatia | Buryatia | Dashibal Munkozhargalov | United Russia | United Russia | Since 30 September 2026 |
| Dagestan | Makhachkala | Magomed Valikhov | Independent | United Russia | Since 30 September 2026 |
| Dagestan | Buynaksk | Nurbagand Nurbagandov | United Russia | United Russia | Since 30 September 2026 |
| Dagestan | Derbent | Khizri Abakarov | United Russia | United Russia | Since 30 September 2026 |
| (Donetsk People's Republic) DPR | Makiivka | Irina Kuksenkova | United Russia | United Russia | Since 30 September 2026 |
| (Donetsk People's Republic) DPR | Donetsk | Alexander Borodai | United Russia | United Russia | Since 30 September 2026 |
| (Donetsk People's Republic) DPR | Horlivka | Sergey Makarov | United Russia | United Russia | Since 30 September 2026 |
| Ingushetia | Ingushetia | Muslim Tatriyev | United Russia | United Russia | Since 30 September 2026 |
| Kabardino-Balkaria | Kabardino-Balkaria | Adalbi Shkhagoshev | United Russia | United Russia | Since 30 September 2026 |
| Kalmykia | Kalmykia | Mikhail Bogatov | United Russia | United Russia | Since 30 September 2026 |
| Karachay-Cherkessia | Karachay-Cherkessia | Soltan Uzdenov | United Russia | United Russia | Since 30 September 2026 |
| Karelia | Karelia | Valentina Pivnenko | United Russia | United Russia | Since 30 September 2026 |
| (Komi Republic) Komi | Syktyvkar | Stanislav Kochev | United Russia | United Russia | Since 30 September 2026 |
| (Republic of Crimea (Russia)) Crimea | Simferopol | Yury Nesterenko | United Russia | United Russia | Since 30 September 2026 |
| (Republic of Crimea (Russia)) Crimea | Kerch | Yanina Pavlenko | United Russia | United Russia | Since 30 September 2026 |
| (Republic of Crimea (Russia)) Crimea | Yevpatoria | Leonid Babashov | United Russia | United Russia | Since 30 September 2026 |
| (Luhansk People's Republic) LPR | Lugansk | Denis Kolesnikov | United Russia | United Russia | Since 30 September 2026 |
| (Luhansk People's Republic) LPR | Alchevsk | Ivan Sanayev | United Russia | United Russia | Since 30 September 2026 |
| Mari El | Mari El | Sergey Kazankov | Communist Party | Communist Party | Since 30 September 2026 |
| Mordovia | Mordovia | Viktor Kidyayev | United Russia | United Russia | Since 30 September 2026 |
| (Sakha Republic) Sakha (Yakutia) | Yakutia | Pyotr Shamayev | United Russia | United Russia | Since 30 September 2026 |
| (North Ossetia–Alania) North Ossetia-Alania | North Ossetia | Artur Taymazov | United Russia | United Russia | Since 30 September 2026 |
| Tatarstan | Privolzhsky | Ilia Volfson | United Russia | United Russia | Since 30 September 2026 |
| Tatarstan | Moskovsky | Ruslan Yusupov | Liberal Democratic Party | Liberal Democratic Party | Since 30 September 2026 |
| Tatarstan | Nizhnekamsk | Oleg Morozov | United Russia | United Russia | Since 30 September 2026 |
| Tatarstan | Naberezhnye Chelny | Alfiya Kogogina | United Russia | United Russia | Since 30 September 2026 |
| Tatarstan | Almetyevsk | Marsel Shaydullin | United Russia | United Russia | Since 30 September 2026 |
| Tatarstan | Central | Marat Nuriyev | United Russia | United Russia | Since 30 September 2026 |
| Tuva | Tuva | Buyan Kuular | United Russia | United Russia | Since 30 September 2026 |
| Udmurtia | Udmurtia | Andrey Isayev | United Russia | United Russia | Since 30 September 2026 |
| Udmurtia | Izhevsk | Oleg Garin | United Russia | United Russia | Since 30 September 2026 |
| Khakassia | Khakassia | Alexander Shtygashev | United Russia | United Russia | Since 30 September 2026 |
| Chechnya | Chechnya | Adam Delimkhanov | United Russia | United Russia | Since 30 September 2026 |
| Chuvashia | Kanash | Anatoly Aksakov | A Just Russia | A Just Russia | Since 30 September 2026 |
| Chuvashia | Cheboksary | Alla Salayeva | United Russia | United Russia | Since 30 September 2026 |
| Altai Krai | Barnaul | Daniil Bessarabov | United Russia | United Russia | Since 30 September 2026 |
| Altai Krai | Biysk | Ivan Loor | United Russia | United Russia | Since 30 September 2026 |
| Altai Krai | Slavgorod | Denis Goloborodko | United Russia | United Russia | Since 30 September 2026 |
| Zabaykalsky Krai | Zabaykalye | Marina Sekerzhitskaya | United Russia | United Russia | Since 30 September 2026 |
| Kamchatka Krai | Kamchatka | Irina Yarovaya | United Russia | United Russia | Since 30 September 2026 |
| Krasnodar Krai | Krasnodar | Igor Bragarnik | United Russia | United Russia | Since 30 September 2026 |
| Krasnodar Krai | North-Western | Dmitry Lameykin | United Russia | United Russia | Since 30 September 2026 |
| Krasnodar Krai | South-Western | Galina Golovchenko | United Russia | United Russia | Since 30 September 2026 |
| Krasnodar Krai | Western | Ivan Demchenko | United Russia | United Russia | Since 30 September 2026 |
| Krasnodar Krai | Chernomorsky | Sergey Altukhov | United Russia | United Russia | Since 30 September 2026 |
| Krasnodar Krai | Southern | Konstantin Zatulin | United Russia | United Russia | Since 30 September 2026 |
| Krasnodar Krai | Eastern | Alexey Ezubov | United Russia | United Russia | Since 30 September 2026 |
| Krasnodar Krai | South-Eastern | Aleksey Shtanichev | United Russia | United Russia | Since 30 September 2026 |
| Krasnodar Krai | Northern | Dmitry Lotsmanov | United Russia | United Russia | Since 30 September 2026 |
| Krasnoyarsk Krai | Krasnoyarsk | Oleg Likontsev | United Russia | United Russia | Since 30 September 2026 |
| Krasnoyarsk Krai | Central | Alexander Drozdov | United Russia | United Russia | Since 30 September 2026 |
| Krasnoyarsk Krai | Divnogorsk | Sergey Yeryomin | United Russia | United Russia | Since 30 September 2026 |
| Krasnoyarsk Krai | Yeniseysk | Andrey Grachyov | United Russia | United Russia | Since 30 September 2026 |
| Perm Krai | Perm | Anton Nemkin | United Russia | United Russia | Since 30 September 2026 |
| Perm Krai | Chusovoy | Roman Vodyanov | United Russia | United Russia | Since 30 September 2026 |
| Perm Krai | Kungur | Irina Ivenskikh | United Russia | United Russia | Since 30 September 2026 |
| Perm Krai | Kudymkar | Oleg Kalinsky | United Russia | United Russia | Since 30 September 2026 |
| Primorsky Krai | Vladivostok | Aleksandr Shcherbakov | United Russia | United Russia | Since 30 September 2026 |
| Primorsky Krai | Artyom | Gennady Bykayev | United Russia | United Russia | Since 30 September 2026 |
| Primorsky Krai | Arsenyev | Kirill Tikhonovich | United Russia | United Russia | Since 30 September 2026 |
| Stavropol Krai | Stavropol | Olga Kazakova | United Russia | United Russia | Since 30 September 2026 |
| Stavropol Krai | Nevinnomyssk | Dmitri Shuvayev | United Russia | United Russia | Since 30 September 2026 |
| Stavropol Krai | Mineralnye Vody | Ilya Drozdov | Independent | Liberal Democratic Party | Since 30 September 2026 |
| Stavropol Krai | Georgiyevsk | Yelena Bondarenko | United Russia | United Russia | Since 30 September 2026 |
| Khabarovsk Krai | Khabarovsk | Sergey Kravchuk | United Russia | United Russia | Since 30 September 2026 |
| Khabarovsk Krai | Komsomolsk-na-Amure | Maxim Ivanov | United Russia | United Russia | Since 30 September 2026 |
| Amur Oblast | Amur | Vyacheslav Loginov | United Russia | United Russia | Since 30 September 2026 |
| Arkhangelsk Oblast | Arkhangelsk | Igor Arsentyev | United Russia | United Russia | Since 30 September 2026 |
| Arkhangelsk Oblast | Kotlas | Maria Kharchenko | Liberal Democratic Party | Liberal Democratic Party | Since 30 September 2026 |
| Astrakhan Oblast | Astrakhan | Rinat Ayupov | United Russia | United Russia | Since 30 September 2026 |
| Belgorod Oblast | Belgorod | Nikita Rumyantsev | United Russia | United Russia | Since 30 September 2026 |
| Belgorod Oblast | Stary Oskol | Andrei Skoch | United Russia | United Russia | Since 30 September 2026 |
| Bryansk Oblast | Bryansk | Nikolai Shcheglov | United Russia | United Russia | Since 30 September 2026 |
| Bryansk Oblast | Unecha | Oleg Matytsin | United Russia | United Russia | Since 30 September 2026 |
| Vladimir Oblast | Vladimir | Igor Igoshin | United Russia | United Russia | Since 30 September 2026 |
| Vladimir Oblast | Suzdal | Grigory Anikeyev | United Russia | United Russia | Since 30 September 2026 |
| Volgograd Oblast | Volgograd | Nikolay Nikolayev | United Russia | United Russia | Since 30 September 2026 |
| Volgograd Oblast | Mikhaylovka | Andrey Gimbatov | United Russia | United Russia | Since 30 September 2026 |
| Volgograd Oblast | Volzhsky | Vitaly Likhachyov | United Russia | United Russia | Since 30 September 2026 |
| Vologda Oblast | Vologda | Sergey Selyanin | United Russia | United Russia | Since 30 September 2026 |
| Vologda Oblast | Cherepovets | Svetlana Grachyova | United Russia | United Russia | Since 30 September 2026 |
| Voronezh Oblast | Voronezh | Arkady Ponomaryov | United Russia | United Russia | Since 30 September 2026 |
| Voronezh Oblast | Anna | Sergey Chizhov | United Russia | United Russia | Since 30 September 2026 |
| Voronezh Oblast | Pavlovsk | Alexey Gordeyev | United Russia | United Russia | Since 30 September 2026 |
| Zaporizhzhia Oblast | Zaporizhzhia | Alexey Tikhomirov | United Russia | United Russia | Since 30 September 2026 |
| Ivanovo Oblast | Ivanovo | Vitaly Drozdov | United Russia | United Russia | Since 30 September 2026 |
| Irkutsk Oblast | Irkutsk | Alexander Yakubovsky | United Russia | United Russia | Since 30 September 2026 |
| Irkutsk Oblast | Angarsk | Vadim Logunov | United Russia | United Russia | Since 30 September 2026 |
| Irkutsk Oblast | Shelekhov | Sergey Ten | United Russia | United Russia | Since 30 September 2026 |
| Irkutsk Oblast | Bratsk | Oleg Novitsky | Communist Party | Communist Party | Since 30 September 2026 |
| Kaliningrad Oblast | Kaliningrad | Andrey Kozlov | United Russia | United Russia | Since 30 September 2026 |
| Kaliningrad Oblast | Central | Marina Orgeyeva | United Russia | United Russia | Since 30 September 2026 |
| Kaluga Oblast | Kaluga | Gennady Sklyar | United Russia | United Russia | Since 30 September 2026 |
| Kemerovo Oblast | Kemerovo | Anton Gorelkin | United Russia | United Russia | Since 30 September 2026 |
| Kemerovo Oblast | Prokopyevsk | Vyacheslav Petrov | United Russia | United Russia | Since 30 September 2026 |
| Kemerovo Oblast | Zavodsky | Pavel Fedyaev | United Russia | United Russia | Since 30 September 2026 |
| Kemerovo Oblast | Novokuznetsk | Oleg Matveychev | United Russia | United Russia | Since 30 September 2026 |
| Kirov Oblast | Kirov | Boris Vesnin | United Russia | United Russia | Since 30 September 2026 |
| Kirov Oblast | Kirovo-Chepetsk | Andrey Berezin | United Russia | United Russia | Since 30 September 2026 |
| Kostroma Oblast | Kostroma | Alexey Anokhin | United Russia | United Russia | Since 30 September 2026 |
| Kurgan Oblast | Kurgan | Alexander Iltyakov | United Russia | United Russia | Since 30 September 2026 |
| Kursk Oblast | Kursk | Vasily Piskaryov | United Russia | United Russia | Since 30 September 2026 |
| Kursk Oblast | Seimsky | Alexey Zolotarev | United Russia | United Russia | Since 30 September 2026 |
| Leningrad Oblast | Vsevolozhsk | Svetlana Zhurova | United Russia | United Russia | Since 30 September 2026 |
| Leningrad Oblast | Kingisepp | Sergey Yakhnyuk | United Russia | United Russia | Since 30 September 2026 |
| Leningrad Oblast | Volkhov | Sergey Petrov | United Russia | United Russia | Since 30 September 2026 |
| Lipetsk Oblast | Lipetsk | Sergey Kurbatov | Independent | New People | Since 30 September 2026 |
| Lipetsk Oblast | Levoberezhny | Tatyana Dyakonova | United Russia | United Russia | Since 30 September 2026 |
| Magadan Oblast | Magadan | Bogdan Bulychev | United Russia | United Russia | Since 30 September 2026 |
| Moscow Oblast | Balashikha | Sergey Yurov | United Russia | United Russia | Since 30 September 2026 |
| Moscow Oblast | Dmitrov | Denis Kravchenko | United Russia | United Russia | Since 30 September 2026 |
| Moscow Oblast | Kolomna | Nikita Chaplin | United Russia | United Russia | Since 30 September 2026 |
| Moscow Oblast | Krasnogorsk | Sergey Kolunov | United Russia | United Russia | Since 30 September 2026 |
| Moscow Oblast | Lyubertsy | Roman Teryushkov | United Russia | United Russia | Since 30 September 2026 |
| Moscow Oblast | Mytishchi | Alexander Legkov | United Russia | United Russia | Since 30 September 2026 |
| Moscow Oblast | Odintsovo | Denis Maydanov | United Russia | United Russia | Since 30 September 2026 |
| Moscow Oblast | Orekhovo-Zuyevo | Gennady Panin | United Russia | United Russia | Since 30 September 2026 |
| Moscow Oblast | Podolsk | Viacheslav Fetisov | United Russia | United Russia | Since 30 September 2026 |
| Moscow Oblast | Sergiyev Posad | Sergey Pakhomov | United Russia | United Russia | Since 30 September 2026 |
| Moscow Oblast | Serpukhov | Aleksandr Kogan | United Russia | United Russia | Since 30 September 2026 |
| Moscow Oblast | Shchyolkovo | Andrey Bulgakov | United Russia | United Russia | Since 30 September 2026 |
| Murmansk Oblast | Murmansk | Tatiana Kusayko | United Russia | United Russia | Since 30 September 2026 |
| Nizhny Novgorod Oblast | Nizhny Novgorod | Yury Stankevich | United Russia | United Russia | Since 30 September 2026 |
| Nizhny Novgorod Oblast | Prioksky | Yevgeny Kostin | United Russia | United Russia | Since 30 September 2026 |
| Nizhny Novgorod Oblast | Avtozavodsky | Dmitry Grachyov | United Russia | United Russia | Since 30 September 2026 |
| Nizhny Novgorod Oblast | Kanavinsky | Yulia Garevskaya | United Russia | United Russia | Since 30 September 2026 |
| Nizhny Novgorod Oblast | Bor | Artyom Kavinov | United Russia | United Russia | Since 30 September 2026 |
| Novgorod Oblast | Novgorod | Artyom Kiryanov | United Russia | United Russia | Since 30 September 2026 |
| Novosibirsk Oblast | Novosibirsk | Oleg Ivaninsky | United Russia | United Russia | Since 30 September 2026 |
| Novosibirsk Oblast | Central | Dmitry Savelyev | United Russia | United Russia | Since 30 September 2026 |
| Novosibirsk Oblast | Iskitim | Aleksandr Aksyonenko | A Just Russia | A Just Russia | Since 30 September 2026 |
| Novosibirsk Oblast | Barabinsk | Viktor Ignatov | United Russia | United Russia | Since 30 September 2026 |
| Omsk Oblast | Omsk | Dmitry Perminov | United Russia | United Russia | Since 30 September 2026 |
| Omsk Oblast | Moskalenki | Oleg Smolin | Communist Party | Communist Party | Since 30 September 2026 |
| Omsk Oblast | Lyubinsky | Igor Antropenko | United Russia | United Russia | Since 30 September 2026 |
| Orenburg Oblast | Orenburg | Andrey Anikeyev | United Russia | United Russia | Since 30 September 2026 |
| Orenburg Oblast | Buguruslan | Oleg Dimov | United Russia | United Russia | Since 30 September 2026 |
| Orenburg Oblast | Orsk | Valery Leonov | United Russia | United Russia | Since 30 September 2026 |
| Oryol Oblast | Oryol | Aleksandr Biryukov | United Russia | United Russia | Since30 September 2026 |
| Penza Oblast | Penza | Dmitry Kadenkov | United Russia | United Russia | Since 30 September 2026 |
| Penza Oblast | Lermontovsky | Igor Rudensky | United Russia | United Russia | Since 30 September 2026 |
| Pskov Oblast | Pskov | Alexander Kozlovsky | United Russia | United Russia | Since 30 September 2026 |
| Rostov Oblast | Rostov | Dmitry Sizyakin | United Russia | United Russia | Since 30 September 2026 |
| Rostov Oblast | Bataysk | Sergey Rozhkov | United Russia | United Russia | Since 30 September 2026 |
| Rostov Oblast | Neklinovsky | Artyom Velichko | United Russia | United Russia | Since 30 September 2026 |
| Rostov Oblast | Novocherkassk | Sergey Medvedev | United Russia | United Russia | Since 30 September 2026 |
| Rostov Oblast | Belaya Kalitva | Aslan Huade | United Russia | United Russia | Since 30 September 2026 |
| Rostov Oblast | Ust-Donetsky | Yekaterina Stenyakina | United Russia | United Russia | Since 30 September 2026 |
| Ryazan Oblast | Ryazan | Andrei Krasov | United Russia | United Russia | Since 30 September 2026 |
| Ryazan Oblast | Skopin | Liana Pepelyaeva | United Russia | United Russia | Since 30 September 2026 |
| Samara Oblast | Samara | Alexander Fetisov | United Russia | United Russia | Since 30 September 2026 |
| Samara Oblast | Tolyatti | Leonid Kalashnikov | Communist Party | Communist Party | Since 30 September 2026 |
| Samara Oblast | Krasnoglinsky | Denis Portnyagin | United Russia | United Russia | Since 30 September 2026 |
| Samara Oblast | Zhigulyovsk | Andrey Trifonov | United Russia | United Russia | Since 30 September 2026 |
| Samara Oblast | Promyshlenny | Aleksandr Zhivaikin | United Russia | United Russia | Since 30 September 2026 |
| Saratov Oblast | Saratov | Vyacheslav Volodin | United Russia | United Russia | Since 30 September 2026 |
| Saratov Oblast | Balakovo | Antonina Galyashkina | United Russia | United Russia | Since 30 September 2026 |
| Saratov Oblast | Balashov | Nikolay Pankov | United Russia | United Russia | Since 30 September 2026 |
| Saratov Oblast | Engels | Alexander Yanklovich | United Russia | United Russia | Since 30 September 2026 |
| Sakhalin Oblast | Sakhalin | Georgy Karlov | United Russia | United Russia | Since 30 September 2026 |
| Sverdlovsk Oblast | Sverdlovsk | Andrey Alshevskikh | United Russia | United Russia | Since 30 September 2026 |
| Sverdlovsk Oblast | Kamensk-Uralsky | Lev Kovpak | United Russia | United Russia | Since 30 September 2026 |
| Sverdlovsk Oblast | Beryozovsky | Vladimir Smirnov | United Russia | United Russia | Since 30 September 2026 |
| Sverdlovsk Oblast | Nizhny Tagil | Aleksey Svalov | United Russia | United Russia | Since 30 September 2026 |
| Sverdlovsk Oblast | Asbest | Zhanna Ryabtseva | United Russia | United Russia | Since 30 September 2026 |
| Sverdlovsk Oblast | Pervouralsk | Zelimkhan Mutsoev | United Russia | United Russia | Since 30 September 2026 |
| Sverdlovsk Oblast | Serov | Sergey Bidonko | United Russia | United Russia | Since 30 September 2026 |
| Smolensk Oblast | Smolensk | Alexander Babakov | A Just Russia | A Just Russia | Since 30 September 2026 |
| Tambov Oblast | Tambov | Tamara Frolova | United Russia | United Russia | Since 30 September 2026 |
| Tver Oblast | Tver | Alena Arshinova | United Russia | United Russia | Since 30 September 2026 |
| Tver Oblast | Zavolzhsky | Vladimir Vasilyev | United Russia | United Russia | Since 30 September 2026 |
| Tomsk Oblast | Tomsk | Ilya Leontyev | United Russia | United Russia | Since 30 September 2026 |
| Tula Oblast | Tula | Yury Brovko | United Russia | United Russia | Since 30 September 2026 |
| Tula Oblast | Novomoskovsk | Nadezhda Shkolkina | United Russia | United Russia | Since 30 September 2026 |
| Tyumen Oblast | Tyumen | Nikolay Brykin | United Russia | United Russia | Since 30 September 2026 |
| Tyumen Oblast | Zavodoukovsk | Ivan Kvitka | United Russia | United Russia | Since 30 September 2026 |
| Ulyanovsk Oblast | Ulyanovsk | Vladimir Kameko | United Russia | United Russia | Sinxe 30 September 2026 |
| Ulyanovsk Oblast | Radishchevo | Vladimir Kononov | United Russia | United Russia | Since 30 September 2026 |
| Kherson Oblast | Kherson | Yelena Dmitruk | United Russia | United Russia | Since 30 September 2026 |
| Chelyabinsk Oblast | Chelyabinsk | Yevgeny Ille | United Russia | United Russia | Since 30 September 2026 |
| Chelyabinsk Oblast | Metallurgichesky | Alexey Denisenko | United Russia | United Russia | Since 30 September 2026 |
| Chelyabinsk Oblast | Korkino | Valery Gartung | A Just Russia | A Just Russia | Since 30 September 2026 |
| Chelyabinsk Oblast | Magnitogorsk | Vladimir Dremov | United Russia | United Russia | Since 30 September 2026 |
| Chelyabinsk Oblast | Zlatoust | Anton Kovalyov | United Russia | United Russia | Since 30 September 2026 |
| Yaroslavl Oblast | Yaroslavl | Anatoly Lisitsyn | Independent | Unaffiliated | Since 30 September 2026 |
| Yaroslavl Oblast | Rostov | Artyom Molchanov | United Russia | United Russia | Since 30 September 2026 |
| Moscow | Babushkinsky | Vladislav Gusev | United Russia | United Russia | Since 30 September 2026 |
| Moscow | Kuntsevo | Yevgeny Popov | United Russia | United Russia | Since 30 September 2026 |
| Moscow | Leningradsky | Eldar Sharipov | United Russia | United Russia | Since 30 September 2026 |
| Moscow | Lyublino | Pyotr Tolstoy | United Russia | United Russia | Since 30 September 2026 |
| Moscow | Medvedkovo | Alexander Shelkovoy | United Russia | United Russia | Since 30 September 2026 |
| Moscow | Nagatinsky | Svetlana Razvorotneva | United Russia | United Russia | Since 30 September 2026 |
| Moscow | New Moscow | Dmitry Sablin | United Russia | United Russia | Since 30 September 2026 |
| Moscow | Orekhovo–Borisovo | Evgeny Nifantiev | United Russia | United Russia | Since 30 September 2026 |
| Moscow | Perovo | Eduard Shonov | United Russia | United Russia | Since 30 September 2026 |
| Moscow | Preobrazhensky | Vladislav Tretiak | United Russia | United Russia | Since 30 September 2026 |
| Moscow | Tushino | Eduard Kazymov | United Russia | United Russia | Since 30 September 2026 |
| Moscow | Khovrino | Aleksandr Asafov | United Russia | United Russia | Since 30 September 2026 |
| Moscow | Central | Oleg Leonov | United Russia | United Russia | Since 30 September 2026 |
| Moscow | Cheryomushki | Dmitry Nazarov | United Russia | United Russia | Since 30 September 2026 |
| Moscow | Chertanovo | Roman Romanenko | United Russia | United Russia | Since 30 September 2026 |
| Moscow | Solntsevo | Yevgeny Andrienko | United Russia | United Russia | Since 30 September 2026 |
| Saint Petersburg | Eastern | Mikhail Rakhlin | United Russia | United Russia | Since 30 September 2026 |
| Saint Petersburg | Western | Alexander Teterdinko | United Russia | United Russia | Since 30 September 2026 |
| Saint Petersburg | Northern | Irina Ivanova | Communist Party | Communist Party | Since 30 September 2026 |
| Saint Petersburg | North East | Yekaterina Kondratyeva | United Russia | United Russia | Since 30 September 2026 |
| Saint Petersburg | North West | Nikolay Tsed | United Russia | United Russia | Since 30 September 2026 |
| Saint Petersburg | Central | Alexander Amelin | United Russia | United Russia | Since 30 September 2026 |
| Saint Petersburg | South East | Lyubov Yegorova | United Russia | United Russia | Since 30 September 2026 |
| Saint Petersburg | Southern | Vitaly Milonov | United Russia | United Russia | Since 30 September 2026 |
| Sevastopol | Sevastopol | Tatiana Lobach | United Russia | United Russia | Since 30 September 2026 |
| Jewish AO | Jewish | Badma Bashankayev | United Russia | United Russia | Since 30 September 2026 |
| Nenets AO | Nenets | Mikhail Kislyakov | United Russia | United Russia | Since 30 September 2026 |
| Khanty-Mansi AO | Khanty-Mansiysk | Pavel Zavalny | United Russia | United Russia | Since 30 September 2026 |
| Khanty-Mansi AO | Nizhnevartovsk | Dmitry Aksyonov | United Russia | United Russia | Since 30 September 2026 |
| Chukotka AO | Chukotka | Aleksandr Dudorov | United Russia | United Russia | Since 30 September 2026 |
| Yamalo-Nenets AO | Yamalo-Nenets | Dmitry Pogorely | United Russia | United Russia | Since 30 September 2026 |

== By party lists ==
=== Communist Party ===
1. Gennady Zyuganov
2. Yury Afonin
3. Dmitry Novikov
4. Ivan Melnikov
5. Vladimir Kashin
6. Nikolay Kharitonov
7. Nikolay Kolomeitsev
8. Kazbek Taysaev
9. Maria Drobot
10. Boris Komotsky
11. Sergey Gavrilov
12. Yury Sinelshchikov
13. Alexey Kurinny
14. Mikhail Avdeev
15. Ksenia Aytakova
16. Olga Alimova
17. Ivan Babich
18. Evgeny Bessonov
19. Anatoly Bifov
20. Boris Ivanyuzhenkov
21. Anzhelika Glazkova
22. Vladislav Yegorov
23. Nikolay Ivanov
24. Alexander Ivachev
25. Georgy Kamnev
26. Vadim Kumin
27. Oleg Lebedev
28. Anatoly Lokot
29. Roman Lyabikhov
30. Nikolay Osadchy
31. Nina Ostanina
32. Svetlana Savitskaya

=== United Russia ===
1. Vladislav Golovin
2. Baldan Tsydypov
3. Viktor Pinsky
4. Galina Danchikova
5. Sergey Boyarsky
6. Alexandra Rodionova
7. Evgeny Kazakov
8. Vyacheslav Damdintsurunov
9. Maria Vasilkova
10. Natalya Kaptelinina
11. Nikolay Shulginov
12. Irina Guseva
13. Alexey Savin
14. Dmitry Tuleyev
15. Vladimir Shamanov
16. Alexander Zhukov
17. Vladimir Saybel
18. Dmitry Kobylkin
19. Ernest Valeev
20. Olga Anufriyeva
21. Sergey Lisovsky
22. Anatoly Karpov
23. Darya Svetyash
24. Pavel Krasheninnikov
25. Oleg Golikov
26. Dmitry Vyatkin
27. Andrey Klimov
28. Yelena Gushchina
29. Irina Pankina
30. Natalya Orlova
31. Rizvan Kurbanov
32. Rima Batalova
33. Vladimir Senin
34. Tatyana Mashkovskaya
35. Nursultan Mussagaleev
36. Leonid Simanovsky
37. Andrey Parfyonov
38. Abdulgamid Emirgamzaev
39. Leonid Ivlev
40. Tatyana Ishmatova
41. Vladimir Pechenkin
42. Aidar Metshin
43. Maxim Topilin
44. Zyavdat Salikhov
45. Irek Boguslavsky
46. Ruslan Gadzhiev
47. Anatoly Ivanov
48. Andrey Makarov
49. Roman Lyubarsky
50. Pavel Karasyov
51. Alexander Borisov
52. Vyacheslav Makarov
53. Anna Kuznetsova
54. Gleb Khor
55. Sergei Gladkov
56. Artyom Bichayev
57. Alexander Shchipkov
58. Aleksandr Sidyakin
59. Sergei Khaustov
60. Yevgeny Revenko
61. Roman Vlasov
62. Aleksey Govyrin
63. Alexander Gusakovsky
64. Artyom Kartsev
65. Valentina Tereshkova
66. Alexander Bogomaz
67. Vladimir Plotnikov
68. Artem Turov
69. Dmitry Afanasyev
70. Aleksandr Nikitin
71. Maksim Kavdzharadze
72. Vyacheslav Vorobyov
73. Viktor Trofimenko
74. Anton Tsvetkov
75. Irina Belykh
76. Vladimir Resin
77. Viktor Seliverstov
78. Albina Gadzhiyeva
79. Darya Lantratova
80. Sergei Kostin
81. Anatoly Vyborny
82. ~~Irina Yeliferova~~ → Sholban Kara-ool
83. Lyudmila Bolilaya
84. Vitaly Savelyev
85. Irina Rodnina
86. Rakhim Azimov
87. Bekkhan Agayev
88. Vyacheslav Fomichyov
89. Olga Zanko
90. Anton Moroz
91. Natalya Moskvitina
92. Nikolai Valuev
93. Yury Petrov
94. Elena Tsunaeva
95. Evgeny Fedorov
96. Fyodor Mikheev
97. Alexander Sholokhov
98. Viktoria Abramchenko
99. Vladimir Gutenev
100. Sergey Burlakov
101. Yevgeny Moskvichev
102. Vladimir Marchenko
103. Igor Vorobyov
104. Leonid Ogul
105. Nikolai Doluda
106. Natalya Kostenko
107. Svetlana Bessarab
108. Alexey Tkachov
109. Sergei Krivonosov
110. Galina Danilchenko
111. Darya Dyakova
112. Sergei Kovalyov
113. Mikhail Sheremet
114. Anton Starostin
115. Nikolay Alexeyenko
116. Vladimir Ivanov
117. Raisa Karmazina
118. Igor Ivanov
119. Zaur Gekkiev
120. Mikhail Starshinov
121. Enver Nabiev
122. Sapizhat Mazayeva
123. Jamal Kasumov
124. Shumi Shabatayev
125. Tagir Khaibulaev
126. Bekkhan Barakhoyev
127. Zurab Makiev
128. Shamsail Saraliev
129. Ruslan Lechkhadzhiev
130. Akhmed Dogayev
131. Viktor Vodolatsky
132. Tatiana Moskalkova
133. Vyacheslav Nikonov
134. Vladimir Kasatonov
135. Yan Leshchenko
136. Sergei Dobrovolsky
137. Viktor Nikolayenko
138. Dmitry Vorona
139. Dmitry Gartsev
140. Yevgeny Sobolev

=== Liberal Democratic Party ===
1. Leonid Slutsky
2. Alexey Vereshchagin
3. Maria Voropaeva
4. Andrey Lugovoy
5. Viktor Bout
6. Aleksandr Kurdyumov
7. Dmitry Zhirkovv
8. Dmitry Svishchev
9. Sergey Kozlov (ambassador)
10. Boris Chernyshov
11. Dmitry Shatunov
12. Vladimir Sysoyev
13. Vladislav Atmakhov
14. Sergey Antoshin
15. Alexey Slotyuk
16. Valery Seleznev
17. Dzhambulat Umarov
18. Kaplan Panesh
19. Darya Golubeva
20. Yana Ovchinskaya
21. Eleonora Kavshar

=== A Just Russia ===
1. Sergey Mironov
2. Marina Kim
3. Oleg Chernyshev
4. Serhiy Arbuzov
5. Yury Grigoriev
6. Andrey Kuznetsov
7. Anatoly Greshnevikov
8. Nikolai Starikov
9. Igor Ananskikh
10. Vasily Shvetsov
11. Sergey Kabyshev
12. Aleksandr Vorobyov
13. ~~Konstantin Shagimuratov~~ → Arsen Fadzaev

=== New People ===
1. Alexey Nechayev
2. Vladislav Davankov
3. Sardana Avksentyeva
4. Yaroslav Samylin
5. Alexander Skorobogatko
6. Pavel Korytnikov
7. Roza Chemeris
8. Timur Kanokov
9. Amir Khamitov
10. Sangadzhi Tarbaev
11. Darya Kislitsyna
12. Stanislav Druzhinin
13. Alexander Demin
14. Maksim Gulin
15. Yelena Panova
16. Sergey Vlasov
17. Georgy Arapov
18. ~~Ilya Gorbashov~~ → Anton Tkachev
19. Olga Stepchenko
