= List of members of the 8th Russian State Duma =

Members of the 8th Russian State Duma
←	7th	9th	→

Overview
- Term: 12 October 2021 – 30 September 2026
- Election: 17–19 September 2021
- Party control: United Russia

The 8th State Duma has 450 members. This sitting was elected at the 2021 Russian legislative election.

== By constituencies ==
Members of the State Duma
Federal Subject	Constituency	Name	Party	Faction	Period
Adygea	Adygea	Vladislav Reznik	Independent	United Russia	12 October 2021 – 30 September 2026
Altai Republic	Altai	Roman Ptitsyn	United Russia	United Russia	12 October 2021 – 30 September 2026
Bashkortostan	Ufa	Pavel Kachkayev	United Russia	United Russia	12 October 2021 – 5 May 2025
Bashkortostan	Ufa	vacant	vacant		5 May 2025 – 30 September 2026
Bashkortostan	Blagoveshchensk	Rafael Mardanshin	United Russia	United Russia	12 October 2021 – 30 September 2026
Bashkortostan	Beloretsk	Elvira Aitkulova	United Russia	United Russia	12 October 2021 – 30 September 2026
Bashkortostan	Neftekamsk	Rifat Shaykhutdinov	Civic Platform	Liberal Democratic Party	12 October 2021 – 30 September 2026
Bashkortostan	Salavat	Zarif Baiguskarov	United Russia	United Russia	12 October 2021 – 30 September 2026
Bashkortostan	Sterlitamak	Dinar Gilmutdinov	United Russia	United Russia	12 October 2021 – 30 September 2026
Buryatia	Buryatia	Vyacheslav Damdintsurunov	United Russia	United Russia	12 October 2021 – 30 September 2026
Dagestan	Northern	Abdulkhakim Gadzhiyev	United Russia	United Russia	12 October 2021 – 30 September 2026
Dagestan	Central	Murad Gadzhiev	United Russia	United Russia	12 October 2021 – 30 September 2026
Dagestan	Southern	Dzhamaladin Gasanov	United Russia	United Russia	12 October 2021 – 30 September 2026
Ingushetia	Ingushetia	Muslim Tatriyev	United Russia	United Russia	12 October 2021 – 30 September 2026
Kabardino-Balkaria	Kabardino-Balkaria	Adalbi Shkhagoshev	United Russia	United Russia	12 October 2021 – 30 September 2026
Kalmykia	Kalmykia	Badma Bashankayev	United Russia	United Russia	12 October 2021 – 30 September 2026
Karachay-Cherkessia	Karachay-Cherkessia	Dzhasharbek Uzdenov	United Russia	United Russia	12 October 2021 — 23 April 2023
Karachay-Cherkessia	Karachay-Cherkessia	Soltan Uzdenov	United Russia	United Russia	10 September 2023 – 30 September 2026
Karelia	Karelia	Valentina Pivnenko	United Russia	United Russia	12 October 2021 – 30 September 2026
(Komi Republic) Komi	Syktyvkar	Oleg Mikhailov	Communist Party	Communist Party	12 October 2021 – 30 September 2026
(Republic of Crimea (Russia)) Crimea	Simferopol	Alexey Chernyak	United Russia	United Russia	12 October 2021 — 3 September 2022
(Republic of Crimea (Russia)) Crimea	Simferopol	Yury Nesterenko	United Russia	United Russia	10 September 2023 – 30 September 2026
(Republic of Crimea (Russia)) Crimea	Kerch	Konstantin Bakharev	United Russia	United Russia	12 October 2021 – 30 September 2026
(Republic of Crimea (Russia)) Crimea	Yevpatoria	Leonid Babashov	Independent	United Russia	12 October 2021 – 30 September 2026
Mari El	Mari El	Sergey Kazankov	Communist Party	Communist Party	12 October 2021 – 30 September 2026
Mordovia	Mordovia	Yulia Ogloblina	United Russia	United Russia	12 October 2021 – 30 September 2026
(Sakha Republic) Sakha (Yakutia)	Yakutia	Petr Ammosov	Communist Party	Communist Party	12 October 2021 – 30 September 2026
(North Ossetia–Alania) North Ossetia-Alania	North Ossetia	Artur Taymazov	United Russia	United Russia	12 October 2021 – 30 September 2026
Tatarstan	Privolzhsky	Ilia Volfson	United Russia	United Russia	12 October 2021 – 30 September 2026
Tatarstan	Moskovsky	Ildar Gilmutdinov	United Russia	United Russia	12 October 2021 – 30 September 2026
Tatarstan	Nizhnekamsk	Oleg Morozov	United Russia	United Russia	12 October 2021 – 30 September 2026
Tatarstan	Naberezhnye Chelny	Alfiya Kogogina	United Russia	United Russia	12 October 2021 – 30 September 2026
Tatarstan	Almetyevsk	Azat Yagafarov	United Russia	United Russia	12 October 2021 – 30 September 2026
Tatarstan	Central	Marat Nuriyev	United Russia	United Russia	12 October 2021 – 30 September 2026
Tuva	Tuva	Aidyn Saryglar	United Russia	United Russia	12 October 2021 – 30 December 2025
Tuva	Tuva	vacant	vacant		30 December 2025 – 30 September 2026
Udmurtia	Udmurtia	Andrey Isayev	United Russia	United Russia	12 October 2021 – 30 September 2026
Udmurtia	Izhevsk	Oleg Garin	United Russia	United Russia	12 October 2021 – 30 September 2026
Khakassia	Khakassia	Sergey Sokol	United Russia	United Russia	12 October 2021 – 10 September 2023
Khakassia	Khakassia	Nikolay Shulginov	Independent	United Russia	8 September 2024 – 30 September 2026
Chechnya	Chechnya	Adam Delimkhanov	United Russia	United Russia	12 October 2021 – 30 September 2026
Chuvashia	Kanash	Anatoly Aksakov	A Just Russia — For Truth	A Just Russia	12 October 2021 – 30 September 2026
Chuvashia	Cheboksary	Alla Salayeva	United Russia	United Russia	12 October 2021 – 30 September 2026
Altai Krai	Barnaul	Daniil Bessarabov	United Russia	United Russia	12 October 2021 – 30 September 2026
Altai Krai	Rubtsovsk	Maria Prusakova	Communist Party	Communist Party	12 October 2021 – 30 September 2026
Altai Krai	Biysk	Alexander Prokopyev	United Russia	United Russia	12 October 2021 – 25 June 2024
Altai Krai	Biysk	vacant	vacant		25 June 2024 – 30 September 2026
Altai Krai	Slavgorod	Ivan Loor	United Russia	United Russia	12 October 2021 – 30 September 2026
Zabaykalsky Krai	Chita	Alexander Skachkov	United Russia	United Russia	12 October 2021 – 30 September 2026
Zabaykalsky Krai	Dauria	Yury Grigoriev	A Just Russia — For Truth	A Just Russia	12 October 2021 – 30 September 2026
Kamchatka Krai	Kamchatka	Irina Yarovaya	United Russia	United Russia	12 October 2021 – 30 September 2026
Krasnodar Krai	Krasnodar	Yevgeny Pervyshov	United Russia	United Russia	12 October 2021 – 4 November 2024
Krasnodar Krai	Krasnodar	vacant	vacant		4 November 2024 – 30 September 2026
Krasnodar Krai	Krasnoarmeysk	Dmitry Lameykin	United Russia	United Russia	12 October 2021 – 30 September 2026
Krasnodar Krai	Slavyansk	Ivan Demchenko	United Russia	United Russia	12 October 2021 – 30 September 2026
Krasnodar Krai	Tuapse	Sergey Altukhov	United Russia	United Russia	12 October 2021 – 30 September 2026
Krasnodar Krai	Sochi	Konstantin Zatulin	United Russia	United Russia	12 October 2021 – 30 September 2026
Krasnodar Krai	Tikhoretsk	Alexey Ezubov	United Russia	United Russia	12 October 2021 – 30 September 2026
Krasnodar Krai	Armavir	Andrey Doroshenko	United Russia	United Russia	12 October 2021 – 30 September 2026
Krasnodar Krai	Kanevskaya	Dmitry Lotsmanov	United Russia	United Russia	12 October 2021 – 30 September 2026
Krasnoyarsk Krai	Krasnoyarsk	Yury Shvytkin	United Russia	United Russia	12 October 2021 – 23 March 2026
Krasnoyarsk Krai	Krasnoyarsk	vacant	vacant		23 March 2026 – 30 September 2026
Krasnoyarsk Krai	Central	Alexander Drozdov	United Russia	United Russia	12 October 2021 – 30 September 2026
Krasnoyarsk Krai	Divnogorsk	Viktor Zubarev	United Russia	United Russia	12 October 2021 – 31 May 2023
Krasnoyarsk Krai	Divnogorsk	Sergey Yeryomin	United Russia	United Russia	10 September 2023 – 30 September 2026
Krasnoyarsk Krai	Yeniseysk	Alexey Veller	United Russia	United Russia	12 October 2021 – 30 September 2026
Perm Krai	Perm	Igor Shubin	United Russia	United Russia	12 October 2021 – 30 September 2026
Perm Krai	Chusovoy	Roman Vodyanov	United Russia	United Russia	12 October 2021 – 30 September 2026
Perm Krai	Kungur	Dmitry Skrivanov	United Russia	United Russia	12 October 2021 – 30 September 2026
Perm Krai	Kudymkar	Irina Ivenskikh	United Russia	United Russia	12 October 2021 – 30 September 2026
Primorsky Krai	Vladivostok	Aleksandr Shcherbakov	United Russia	United Russia	12 October 2021 – 30 September 2026
Primorsky Krai	Artyom	Vladimir Novikov	United Russia	United Russia	12 October 2021 – 30 September 2026
Primorsky Krai	Arsenyev	Victoria Nikolaeva	United Russia	United Russia	12 October 2021 – 30 September 2026
Stavropol Krai	Stavropol	Mikhail Kuzmin	United Russia	United Russia	12 October 2021 – 30 September 2026
Stavropol Krai	Nevinnomyssk	Olga Timofeyeva	United Russia	United Russia	12 October 2021 – 30 September 2026
Stavropol Krai	Mineralnye Vody	Olga Kazakova	United Russia	United Russia	12 October 2021 – 30 September 2026
Stavropol Krai	Georgiyevsk	Yelena Bondarenko	United Russia	United Russia	12 October 2021 – 30 September 2026
Khabarovsk Krai	Khabarovsk	Boris Gladkikh	United Russia	United Russia	12 October 2021 – 30 September 2026
Khabarovsk Krai	Komsomolsk-na-Amure	Pavel Simigin	United Russia	United Russia	12 October 2021 – 30 September 2026
Amur Oblast	Amur	Vyacheslav Loginov	United Russia	United Russia	12 October 2021 – 30 September 2026
Arkhangelsk Oblast	Arkhangelsk	Alexander Spiridonov	United Russia	United Russia	12 October 2021 – 30 September 2026
Arkhangelsk Oblast	Kotlas	Elena Vtorygina	United Russia	United Russia	12 October 2021 – 30 September 2026
Astrakhan Oblast	Astrakhan	Leonid Ogul	United Russia	United Russia	12 October 2021 – 30 September 2026
Belgorod Oblast	Belgorod	Valery Skrug	United Russia	United Russia	12 October 2021 – 30 September 2026
Belgorod Oblast	Stary Oskol	Andrei Skoch	United Russia	United Russia	12 October 2021 – 30 September 2026
Bryansk Oblast	Bryansk	Nikolai Valuev	United Russia	United Russia	12 October 2021 – 30 September 2026
Bryansk Oblast	Unecha	Nikolay Alexeyenko	United Russia	United Russia	12 October 2021 – 28 May 2024
Bryansk Oblast	Unecha	Oleg Matytsin	United Russia	United Russia	8 September 2024 – 30 September 2026
Vladimir Oblast	Vladimir	Igor Igoshin	United Russia	United Russia	12 October 2021 – 30 September 2026
Vladimir Oblast	Suzdal	Grigory Anikeyev	United Russia	United Russia	12 October 2021 – 30 September 2026
Volgograd Oblast	Volgograd	Alexey Volotskov	United Russia	United Russia	12 October 2021 – 30 September 2026
Volgograd Oblast	Krasnoarmeysky	Andrey Gimbatov	United Russia	United Russia	12 October 2021 – 30 September 2026
Volgograd Oblast	Mikhaylovka	Vladimir Plotnikov	United Russia	United Russia	12 October 2021 – 30 September 2026
Volgograd Oblast	Volzhsky	Oleg Savchenko	United Russia	United Russia	12 October 2021 – 20 May 2025
Volgograd Oblast	Volzhsky	vacant	vacant		20 May 2025 – 30 September 2026
Vologda Oblast	Vologda	Valentina Artamonova	United Russia	United Russia	12 October 2021 – 30 September 2026
Vologda Oblast	Cherepovets	Alexey Kanayev	United Russia	United Russia	12 October 2021 – 30 September 2026
Vologda Oblast	Cherepovets	Alexey Kanayev	Independent (Note: On 4 February 2025, Alexey Kanayev was expelled from the United Russia party but remained member of its faction in the Duma.)	United Russia	12 October 2021 – 30 September 2026
Voronezh Oblast	Voronezh	Arkady Ponomaryov	United Russia	United Russia	12 October 2021 – 30 September 2026
Voronezh Oblast	Pravoberezhny	Sergey Chizhov	United Russia	United Russia	12 October 2021 – 30 September 2026
Voronezh Oblast	Anna	Andrey Markov	United Russia	United Russia	12 October 2021 – 30 September 2026
Voronezh Oblast	Pavlovsk	Alexey Gordeyev	United Russia	United Russia	12 October 2021 – 30 September 2026
Ivanovo Oblast	Ivanovo	Viktor Smirnov	United Russia	United Russia	12 October 2021 – 30 September 2026
Ivanovo Oblast	Kineshma	Mikhail Kizeyev	United Russia	United Russia	12 October 2021 – 30 September 2026
Irkutsk Oblast	Irkutsk	Mikhail Shchapov	Communist Party	Communist Party	12 October 2021 – 23 September 2025
Irkutsk Oblast	Irkutsk	vacant	vacant		23 September 2025 – 30 September 2026
Irkutsk Oblast	Angarsk	Anton Krasnoshtanov	United Russia	United Russia	12 October 2021 – 30 September 2026
Irkutsk Oblast	Shelekhov	Sergey Ten	United Russia	United Russia	12 October 2021 – 30 September 2026
Irkutsk Oblast	Bratsk	Alexander Yakubovsky	United Russia	United Russia	12 October 2021 – 30 September 2026
Kaliningrad Oblast	Kaliningrad	Andrey Kolesnik	United Russia	United Russia	12 October 2021 – 30 September 2026
Kaliningrad Oblast	Central	Marina Orgeyeva	United Russia	United Russia	12 October 2021 – 30 September 2026
Kaluga Oblast	Kaluga	Olga Korobova	United Russia	United Russia	12 October 2021 – 30 September 2026
Kaluga Oblast	Obninsk	Gennady Sklyar	United Russia	United Russia	12 October 2021 – 30 September 2026
Kemerovo Oblast	Kemerovo	Anton Gorelkin	United Russia	United Russia	12 October 2021 – 30 September 2026
Kemerovo Oblast	Prokopyevsk	Dmitry Islamov	United Russia	United Russia	12 October 2021 – 10 March 2025
Kemerovo Oblast	Prokopyevsk	vacant	vacant		10 March 2025 – 30 September 2026
Kemerovo Oblast	Zavodsky	Pavel Fedyaev	United Russia	United Russia	12 October 2021 – 30 September 2026
Kemerovo Oblast	Novokuznetsk	Alexander Maximov	United Russia	United Russia	12 October 2021 – 30 September 2026
Kirov Oblast	Kirov	Rakhim Azimov	United Russia	United Russia	12 October 2021 – 30 September 2026
Kirov Oblast	Kirovo-Chepetsk	Oleg Valenchuk	United Russia	United Russia	12 October 2021 – 30 September 2026
Kostroma Oblast	Kostroma	Alexey Sitnikov	United Russia	United Russia	12 October 2021 – 30 September 2026
Kurgan Oblast	Kurgan	Alexander Iltyakov	United Russia	United Russia	12 October 2021 – 30 September 2026
Kursk Oblast	Kursk	Yekaterina Kharchenko	United Russia	United Russia	12 October 2021 – 16 June 2026
Kursk Oblast	Kursk	vacant	vacant		16 June 2026 – 30 September 2026
Kursk Oblast	Seimsky	Olga Germanova	United Russia	United Russia	12 October 2021 – 30 September 2026
Leningrad Oblast	Vsevolozhsk	Svetlana Zhurova	United Russia	United Russia	12 October 2021 – 30 September 2026
Leningrad Oblast	Kingisepp	Sergey Yakhnyuk	United Russia	United Russia	12 October 2021 – 30 September 2026
Leningrad Oblast	Volkhov	Sergey Petrov	United Russia	United Russia	12 October 2021 – 30 September 2026
Lipetsk Oblast	Lipetsk	Nikolay Bortsov	United Russia	United Russia	12 October 2021 — 23 April 2023
Lipetsk Oblast	Lipetsk	Dmitry Averov	United Russia	United Russia	10 September 2023 – 30 September 2026
Lipetsk Oblast	Levoberezhny	Mikhail Tarasenko	United Russia	United Russia	12 October 2021 – 22 July 2025
Lipetsk Oblast	Levoberezhny	vacant	vacant		22 July 2025 – 30 September 2026
Magadan Oblast	Magadan	Anton Basansky	United Russia	United Russia	12 October 2021 – 4 March 2025
Magadan Oblast	Magadan	vacant	vacant		4 March 2025 – 30 September 2026
Moscow Oblast	Balashikha	Vyacheslav Fomichyov	United Russia	United Russia	12 October 2021 – 30 September 2026
Moscow Oblast	Dmitrov	Irina Rodnina	United Russia	United Russia	12 October 2021 – 30 September 2026
Moscow Oblast	Kolomna	Nikita Chaplin	United Russia	United Russia	12 October 2021 – 30 September 2026
Moscow Oblast	Krasnogorsk	Sergey Kolunov	United Russia	United Russia	12 October 2021 – 30 September 2026
Moscow Oblast	Lyubertsy	Roman Teryushkov	United Russia	United Russia	12 October 2021 – 30 September 2026
Moscow Oblast	Odintsovo	Denis Maydanov	United Russia	United Russia	12 October 2021 – 30 September 2026
Moscow Oblast	Orekhovo-Zuyevo	Gennady Panin	United Russia	United Russia	12 October 2021 – 30 September 2026
Moscow Oblast	Podolsk	Viacheslav Fetisov	United Russia	United Russia	12 October 2021 – 30 September 2026
Moscow Oblast	Sergiyev Posad	Sergey Pakhomov	United Russia	United Russia	12 October 2021 – 30 September 2026
Moscow Oblast	Serpukhov	Aleksandr Kogan	United Russia	United Russia	12 October 2021 – 30 September 2026
Moscow Oblast	Shchyolkovo	Alexander Tolmachev	United Russia	United Russia	12 October 2021 – 30 September 2026
Murmansk Oblast	Murmansk	Tatiana Kusayko	United Russia	United Russia	12 October 2021 – 30 September 2026
Nizhny Novgorod Oblast	Nizhny Novgorod	Anatoly Lesun	United Russia	United Russia	12 October 2021 – 30 September 2026
Nizhny Novgorod Oblast	Prioksky	Yevgeny Lebedev	United Russia	United Russia	12 October 2021 – 30 September 2026
Nizhny Novgorod Oblast	Avtozavodsky	Natalia Nazarova	United Russia	United Russia	12 October 2021 – 30 September 2026
Nizhny Novgorod Oblast	Kanavinsky	Vadim Bulavinov	United Russia	United Russia	12 October 2021 – 30 September 2026
Nizhny Novgorod Oblast	Bor	Artyom Kavinov	United Russia	United Russia	12 October 2021 – 30 September 2026
Novgorod Oblast	Novgorod	Artyom Kiryanov	United Russia	United Russia	12 October 2021 – 30 September 2026
Novosibirsk Oblast	Novosibirsk	Oleg Ivaninsky	United Russia	United Russia	12 October 2021 – 30 September 2026
Novosibirsk Oblast	Central	Dmitry Savelyev	United Russia	United Russia	12 October 2021 – 30 September 2026
Novosibirsk Oblast	Iskitim	Aleksandr Aksyonenko	A Just Russia — For Truth	A Just Russia	12 October 2021 – 30 September 2026
Novosibirsk Oblast	Barabinsk	Viktor Ignatov	United Russia	United Russia	12 October 2021 – 30 September 2026
Omsk Oblast	Omsk	Andrey Alekhin	Communist Party	Communist Party	12 October 2021 – 30 September 2026
Omsk Oblast	Moskalenki	Oleg Smolin	Communist Party	Communist Party	12 October 2021 – 30 September 2026
Omsk Oblast	Lyubinsky	Oksana Fadina	United Russia	United Russia	12 October 2021 – 30 September 2026
Orenburg Oblast	Orenburg	Andrey Anikeyev	United Russia	United Russia	12 October 2021 – 30 September 2026
Orenburg Oblast	Buguruslan	Oleg Dimov	United Russia	United Russia	12 October 2021 – 30 September 2026
Orenburg Oblast	Orsk	Viktor Zavarzin	United Russia	United Russia	12 October 2021 – 30 September 2026
Oryol Oblast	Oryol	Olga Pilipenko	United Russia	United Russia	12 October 2021 – 30 September 2026
Penza Oblast	Penza	Igor Rudensky	United Russia	United Russia	12 October 2021 – 30 September 2026
Penza Oblast	Lermontovsky	Aleksandr Samokutyayev	United Russia	United Russia	12 October 2021 – 17 June 2026
Penza Oblast	Lermontovsky	vacant	vacant		17 June 2026 – 30 September 2026
Pskov Oblast	Pskov	Alexander Kozlovsky	United Russia	United Russia	12 October 2021 – 30 September 2026
Rostov Oblast	Rostov	Larisa Tutova	United Russia	United Russia	12 October 2021 – 30 September 2026
Rostov Oblast	Nizhnedonskoy	Anton Getta	United Russia	United Russia	12 October 2021 – 30 September 2026
Rostov Oblast	Taganrog	Sergey Burlakov	United Russia	United Russia	12 October 2021 – 30 September 2026
Rostov Oblast	Southern	Vitaly Kushnarev	United Russia	United Russia	12 October 2021 – 27 May 2024
Rostov Oblast	Southern	Viktoria Abramchenko	United Russia	United Russia	8 September 2024 – 30 September 2026
Rostov Oblast	Belaya Kalitva	Nikolay Goncharov	United Russia	United Russia	12 October 2021 – 30 September 2026
Rostov Oblast	Shakhty	Yekaterina Stenyakina	United Russia	United Russia	12 October 2021 – 30 September 2026
Rostov Oblast	Volgodonsk	Viktor Deryabkin	United Russia	United Russia	12 October 2021 – 30 September 2026
Ryazan Oblast	Ryazan	Andrei Krasov	United Russia	United Russia	12 October 2021 – 30 September 2026
Ryazan Oblast	Skopin	Dmitry Khubezov	United Russia	United Russia	12 October 2021 – 8 October 2024
Ryazan Oblast	Skopin	vacant	vacant		8 October 2024 – 30 September 2026
Samara Oblast	Samara	Alexander Khinshtein	United Russia	United Russia	12 October 2021 – 5 December 2024
Samara Oblast	Samara	vacant	vacant		5 December 2024 – 30 September 2026
Samara Oblast	Tolyatti	Leonid Kalashnikov	Communist Party	Communist Party	12 October 2021 – 30 September 2026
Samara Oblast	Krasnoglinsky	Viktor Kazakov	United Russia	United Russia	12 October 2021 – 30 September 2026
Samara Oblast	Zhigulyovsk	Andrey Trifonov	United Russia	United Russia	12 October 2021 – 30 September 2026
Samara Oblast	Promyshlenny	Mikhail Matveyev	Communist Party	Communist Party	12 October 2021 – 30 September 2026
Saratov Oblast	Saratov	Vyacheslav Volodin	United Russia	United Russia	12 October 2021 – 30 September 2026
Saratov Oblast	Balakovo	Nikolay Pankov	United Russia	United Russia	12 October 2021 – 30 September 2026
Saratov Oblast	Balashov	Andrey Vorobiev	United Russia	United Russia	12 October 2021 – 30 September 2026
Saratov Oblast	Engels	Alexander Strelyukhin	United Russia	United Russia	12 October 2021 – 19 May 2025
Saratov Oblast	Engels	vacant	vacant		19 May 2025 – 30 September 2026
Sakhalin Oblast	Sakhalin	Georgy Karlov	United Russia	United Russia	12 October 2021 – 30 September 2026
Sverdlovsk Oblast	Sverdlovsk	Andrey Alshevskikh	United Russia	United Russia	12 October 2021 – 30 September 2026
Sverdlovsk Oblast	Kamensk-Uralsky	Lev Kovpak	United Russia	United Russia	12 October 2021 – 30 September 2026
Sverdlovsk Oblast	Beryozovsky	Sergei Tchepikov	United Russia	United Russia	12 October 2021 – 17 September 2026
Sverdlovsk Oblast	Beryozovsky	vacant	vacant		17 September 2026 – 30 September 2026
Sverdlovsk Oblast	Nizhny Tagil	Konstantin Zakharov	United Russia	United Russia	12 October 2021 – 30 September 2026
Sverdlovsk Oblast	Asbest	Maxim A. Ivanov	United Russia	United Russia	12 October 2021 – 30 September 2026
Sverdlovsk Oblast	Pervouralsk	Zelimkhan Mutsoev	United Russia	United Russia	12 October 2021 – 30 September 2026
Sverdlovsk Oblast	Serov	Anton Shipulin	United Russia	United Russia	12 October 2021 – 30 September 2026
Smolensk Oblast	Smolensk	Sergey Neverov	United Russia	United Russia	12 October 2021 – 30 September 2026
Smolensk Oblast	Roslavl	Sergey Leonov	Liberal Democratic Party	Liberal Democratic Party	12 October 2021 – 30 September 2026
Tambov Oblast	Tambov	Alexey Zhuravlyov	Rodina	Liberal Democratic Party	12 October 2021 – 30 September 2026
Tambov Oblast	Rasskazovo	Alexander Polyakov	United Russia	United Russia	12 October 2021 – 30 September 2026
Tver Oblast	Tver	Yulia Saranova	United Russia	United Russia	12 October 2021 – 30 September 2026
Tver Oblast	Zavolzhsky	Vladimir Vasilyev	United Russia	United Russia	12 October 2021 – 30 September 2026
Tomsk Oblast	Tomsk	Alexei Didenko	Liberal Democratic Party	Liberal Democratic Party	12 October 2021 – 30 September 2026
Tomsk Oblast	Ob	Tatyana Solomatina	United Russia	United Russia	12 October 2021 – 30 September 2026
Tula Oblast	Tula	Viktor Dzyuba	United Russia	United Russia	12 October 2021 – 16 February 2026
Tula Oblast	Tula	vacant	vacant		16 February 2026 – 30 September 2026
Tula Oblast	Novomoskovsk	Nadezhda Shkolkina	United Russia	United Russia	12 October 2021 – 30 September 2026
Tyumen Oblast	Tyumen	Nikolay Brykin	United Russia	United Russia	12 October 2021 – 30 September 2026
Tyumen Oblast	Zavodoukovsk	Ivan Kvitka	United Russia	United Russia	12 October 2021 – 30 September 2026
Ulyanovsk Oblast	Ulyanovsk	Vladimir Kononov	United Russia	United Russia	12 October 2021 – 30 September 2026
Ulyanovsk Oblast	Radishchevo	Vladislav Tretiak	United Russia	United Russia	12 October 2021 – 30 September 2026
Chelyabinsk Oblast	Chelyabinsk	Vladimir Pavlov	United Russia	United Russia	12 October 2021 – 30 September 2026
Chelyabinsk Oblast	Metallurgichesky	Vladimir Burmatov	United Russia	United Russia	12 October 2021 – 30 September 2026
Chelyabinsk Oblast	Korkino	Valery Gartung	A Just Russia — For Truth	A Just Russia	12 October 2021 – 30 September 2026
Chelyabinsk Oblast	Magnitogorsk	Vitaly Bakhmetyev	United Russia	United Russia	12 October 2021 – 30 September 2026
Chelyabinsk Oblast	Zlatoust	Oleg Kolesnikov	United Russia	United Russia	12 October 2021 – 30 September 2026
Yaroslavl Oblast	Yaroslavl	Anatoly Lisitsyn	A Just Russia — For Truth	A Just Russia	12 October 2021 – 8 April 2026
Yaroslavl Oblast	Yaroslavl	Anatoly Lisitsyn	A Just Russia — For Truth	Unaffiliated (Note: on 17 March 2026 Anatoly Lisitsyn left A Just Russia to run in the United Russia primary, and on 24 March 2026 he was expelled from the faction, which was registered on 8 April 2026)	8 April 2026 – 30 September 2026
Yaroslavl Oblast	Rostov	Anatoly Greshnevikov	A Just Russia — For Truth	A Just Russia	12 October 2021 – 30 September 2026
Moscow	Babushkinsky	Timofey Bazhenov	United Russia	United Russia	12 October 2021 – 30 September 2026
Moscow	Kuntsevo	Yevgeny Popov	United Russia	United Russia	12 October 2021 – 30 September 2026
Moscow	Leningradsky	Galina Khovanskaya	A Just Russia — For Truth	A Just Russia	12 October 2021 – 30 September 2026
Moscow	Lyublino	Pyotr Tolstoy	United Russia	United Russia	12 October 2021 – 30 September 2026
Moscow	Medvedkovo	Dmitry Pevtsov	Independent	New People	12 October 2021 – 30 September 2026
Moscow	Nagatinsky	Svetlana Razvorotneva	United Russia	United Russia	12 October 2021 – 30 September 2026
Moscow	New Moscow	Dmitry Sablin	United Russia	United Russia	12 October 2021 – 30 September 2026
Moscow	Orekhovo–Borisovo	Evgeny Nifantiev	United Russia	United Russia	12 October 2021 – 30 September 2026
Moscow	Perovo	Tatiana Butskaya	United Russia	United Russia	12 October 2021 – 30 September 2026
Moscow	Preobrazhensky	Anatoly Wasserman	Independent	A Just Russia	12 October 2021 – 30 September 2026
Moscow	Tushino	Alexander Mazhuga	United Russia	United Russia	12 October 2021 – 30 September 2026
Moscow	Khovrino	Irina Belykh	United Russia	United Russia	12 October 2021 – 30 September 2026
Moscow	Central	Oleg Leonov	Independent	New People	12 October 2021 – 30 September 2026
Moscow	Cheryomushki	Alexander Rumyantsev	United Russia	United Russia	12 October 2021 – 30 September 2026
Moscow	Chertanovo	Roman Romanenko	United Russia	United Russia	12 October 2021 – 30 September 2026
Saint Petersburg	Eastern	Mikhail Romanov	United Russia	United Russia	12 October 2021 – 30 September 2026
Saint Petersburg	Western	Alexander Teterdinko	United Russia	United Russia	12 October 2021 – 30 September 2026
Saint Petersburg	Northern	Yevgeny Marchenko	United Russia	United Russia	12 October 2021 – 9 November 2021
Saint Petersburg	Northern	Yevgeny Marchenko	United Russia	Unaffiliated (Note: on 2 November 2021 Yevgeny Marchenko was excluded from the United Russia party and on 9 November United Russia faction overwhelmingly voted to expel him)	9 November 2021 – 30 September 2026
Saint Petersburg	North East	Yelena Drapeko	A Just Russia — For Truth	A Just Russia	12 October 2021 – 30 September 2026
Saint Petersburg	North West	Nikolay Tsed	United Russia	United Russia	12 October 2021 – 30 September 2026
Saint Petersburg	Central	Sergey Soloviev	United Russia	United Russia	12 October 2021 – 30 September 2026
Saint Petersburg	South East	Oksana Dmitriyeva	Party of Growth	Unaffiliated	12 October 2021 – 30 September 2026
Saint Petersburg	Southern	Vitaly Milonov	United Russia	United Russia	12 October 2021 – 30 September 2026
Sevastopol	Sevastopol	Tatiana Lobach	United Russia	United Russia	12 October 2021 – 30 September 2026
Jewish AO	Jewish	Alexander Petrov	United Russia	United Russia	12 October 2021 – 30 September 2026
Nenets AO	Nenets	Sergey Kotkin	United Russia	United Russia	12 October 2021 – 30 September 2026
Khanty-Mansi AO	Khanty-Mansiysk	Pavel Zavalny	United Russia	United Russia	12 October 2021 – 30 September 2026
Khanty-Mansi AO	Nizhnevartovsk	Vadim Shuvalov	United Russia	United Russia	12 October 2021 – 30 September 2026
Chukotka AO	Chukotka	Yelena Yevtyukhova	United Russia	United Russia	12 October 2021 – 30 September 2026
Yamalo-Nenets AO	Yamalo-Nenets	Dmitry Pogorely	United Russia	United Russia	12 October 2021 – 30 September 2026

== By party lists ==
=== Communist Party ===
1. Gennady Zyuganov
2. Svetlana Savitskaya
3. Yury Afonin
4. Ivan Melnikov
5. Vladimir Kashin
6. Dmitry Novikov
7. Nikolay Kharitonov
8. Nikolay Kolomeitsev
9. Sergey Shargunov
10. Vadim Kumin
11. Yury Sinelshchikov
12. Kazbek Taysaev
13. Alexey Kurinny
14. Anzhelika Glazkova
15. Alexander Yushchenko
16. Vyacheslav Markhayev
17. Robert Kochiev
18. Anatoly Bifov
19. Nikolay Arefiev
20. Boris Komotsky
21. Irina Filatova
22. Sergey Levchenko
23. Artem Prokofiev
24. Maria Drobot
25. Ivan Babich
26. Nikolay Osadchy
27. Alexey Kornienko
28. Sergey Gavrilov
29. Nikolay Ivanov
30. Roman Lyabikhov
31. Oleg Lebedev
32. Olga Alimova
33. Vladimir Isakov
34. Renat Suleymanov
35. Vladimir Blotsky → Vladislav Yegorov
36. Mikhail Berulava
37. Sergey Panteleev
38. Georgy Kamnev
39. Nikolay Vasiliev
40. Boris Ivanyuzhenkov
41. Viktor Sobolev
42. Mikhail Avdeev
43. Nina Ostanina
44. Evgeny Bessonov
45. Nikolay Ezersky
46. Valery Rashkin → Anastasia Udaltsova
47. Sergei Obukhov
48. Denis Parfenov

=== United Russia ===
1. Anna Kuznetsova
2. Viktor Pinsky
3. Andrey Gurulyov
4. Maksim Ivanov
5. Galina Danchikova
6. Nikolai Buduyev
7. Maria Vasilkova
8. Artur Chilingarov → Natalya Kaptelinina
9. Sholban Kara-ool
10. Veronika Vlasova
11. Mikhail Kiselyov
12. Vladimir Samokish
13. Oleg Matveychev
14. Vyacheslav Petrov
15. Aleksandr Avdeyev → Yury Petrov
16. Vladimir Shamanov
17. Alexander Zhukov
18. Igor Antropenko
19. Dmitry Kobylkin
20. Ernest Valeev
21. Olga Anufriyeva
22. Sergey Lisovsky
23. Pavel Krasheninnikov
24. Zhanna Ryabtseva
25. Sergey Bidonko
26. Oleg Golikov
27. Dmitry Vyatkin
28. Anton Nemkin
29. Rimma Utyasheva
30. Natalya Orlova
31. Vladimir Senin
32. Irina Pankina
33. Rizvan Kurbanov
34. Rima Batalova
35. Vladimir Ilinykh
36. Leonid Simanovsky
37. Vladimir Gutenev
38. Larisa Buranova
39. Maria Butina
40. Mikhail Kislyakov
41. Ayrat Farrakhov → Alexander Bogomaz
42. Tatiana Larionova
43. Aidar Metshin
44. Maxim Topilin
45. Ruslan Gadzhiev
46. Elena Yampolskaya → Anatoly Ivanov
47. Irek Boguslavsky
48. Rustam Kalimullin
49. Andrey Makarov
50. Alena Arshinova
51. Roman Lyubarsky
52. Yury Stankevich
53. Sergey Morozov
54. Gleb Khor
55. Viktor Kidyayev
56. Vitaly Efimov
57. Olga Batalina → Anatoly Karpov
58. Dmitry Kadenkov
59. Vasily Piskaryov
60. Yevgeny Revenko
61. Igor Kastyukevich → Aleksandr Sidyakin
62. Tamara Frolova
63. Aleksey Govyrin
64. Sergey Veremeenko
65. Valentina Tereshkova
66. Artem Turov
67. Nikolai Shcheglov
68. Nikolay Petrunin → Andrey Parfyonov
69. Tatyana Dyakonova
70. Natalia Poluyanova
71. Nikita Rumyantsev
72. Ivan Solodovnikov
73. Vladimir Resin
74. Viktor Seliverstov
75. Andrey Kartapolov
76. Artem Metelev
77. Anatoly Vyborny
78. Yuliya Drozhzhina
79. Mikhail Terentyev
80. Bekkhan Agayev
81. Otari Arshba
82. Denis Kravchenko
83. Alla Polyakova
84. Olga Amelchenkova
85. Aleksandr Borisov
86. Elena Tsunaeva
87. Vyacheslav Makarov
88. Sergey Boyarsky
89. Yevgeny Fyodorov
90. Andrey Gorokhov
91. Vyacheslav Nikonov
92. Viktor Vodolatsky
93. Aleksandr Sholokhov
94. Alexander Borodai
95. Yevgeny Moskvichev
96. Vitaly Likhachyov
97. Nikolay Nikolaev
98. Rinat Ayupov
99. Natalya Kostenko
100. Dmitry Pirog
101. Nikolai Doluda
102. Svetlana Bessarab
103. Sergei Krivonosov
104. Alexey Tkachov
105. Anatoly Voronovsky → Valery Goryukhanov
106. Eduard Kuznetsov
107. Murat Khasanov
108. Mikhail Sheremet
109. Leonid Ivlev
110. Dmitry Belik
111. Aleksey Lavrinenko
112. Raisa Karmazina
113. Vladimir Ivanov
114. Zaur Gekkiyev
115. Viktoria Rodina
116. Mikhail Starshinov
117. Nurbagand Nurgagandov
118. Saygidpasha Umakhanov
119. Khizri Abakarov
120. Artyom Bichayev
121. Biysultan Khamzaev
122. Bekkhan Barakhoyev
123. Zurab Makiev
124. Shamsail Saraliev
125. Akhmed Dogayev
126. Ruslan Lechkhadzhiev

=== Liberal Democratic Party ===
1. Vladimir Zhirinovsky → Andrey Svintsov
2. Leonid Slutsky
3. Sergey Karginov
4. Yaroslav Nilov (Note: expelled from the LDPR faction in June 2025)
5. Vladimir Sipyagin
6. Vasily Vlasov → Vasilina Kuliyeva → Maria Kharchenko
7. Boris Chernyshov
8. Andrey Lugovoy
9. Dmitry Svishchev
10. Valery Seleznev
11. Kaplan Panesh
12. Arkady Svistunov
13. Stanislav Naumov
14. Vladimir Koshelev
15. Ivan Musatov
16. Evgeny Markov → Vladimir Sysoyev
17. Ivan Sukharev
18. Boris Paykin
19. Yury Napso → Dmitry Novikov

=== A Just Russia ===
1. Sergey Mironov
2. Dmitry Kuznetsov (Note: Deputy mandate was originally allocated to Zakhar Prilepin, who declined the seat before ever taking office. This caused the mandate to transfer to Kuznetsov, who entered office on 20 October.)
3. Gennady Semigin
4. Alexander Babakov
5. Alexander Terentyev
6. Fedot Tumusov
7. Timur Kanokov
8. Igor Ananskikh
9. Vadim Belousov → Marina Kim (Note: The party initially allocated the vacant seat to Legislative Assembly of Kirov Oblast member Olesya Redkina in November 2023. Redkina was arrested two weeks later, while the CEC cancelled the planned mandate allocation to Redkina, leaving the seat vacant. The vacancy was filled 6 months later when Marina Kim was chosen instead of Redkina)
10. Dmitry Gusev
11. Alexey Chepa
12. Alexander Remezkov
13. Andrey Kuznetsov
14. Yana Lantratova → Vasily Shvetsov
15. Sergey Kabyshev
16. Mikhail Delyagin
17. Oleg Nilov → Aleksandr Vorobyov
18. Nikolay Novichkov
19. Nikolai Burlyayev

=== New People ===
1. Alexey Nechayev
2. Sardana Avksentyeva
3. Vladislav Davankov
4. Georgy Arapov
5. Grigory Shilkin → Yaroslav Samylin
6. Sergey Chudaev → Anton Tkachev
7. Roza Chemeris
8. Alexander Demin
9. Amir Hamitov
10. Vladimir Plyakin
11. Maksim Gulin → Anna Skroznikova
12. Ksenia Goryacheva
13. Sangadzhi Tarbaev
