= Ilinykh =

Ilinykh or Ilinikh (Russian: Ильиных) is a Russian surname.

- Dmitriy Ilinikh (born 1987), Russian volleyball player
- Elena Ilinykh (born 1994), Russian ice dancer
- Kristina Ilinykh (born 1994), Russian diver
- Vladimir Ilinykh (born 1975), Russian politician
- Yulia Ilinykh (born 1985), Russian road cyclist
