= Rimma Utyasheva =

Russian politician

Rimma Utyasheva MP
- Римма Утяшева
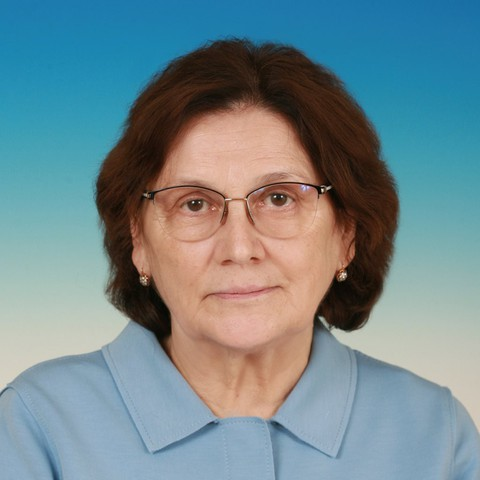

Member of the State Duma (Party List Seat)
- Incumbent
- Assumed office 12 October 2021

Personal details
- Born: 3 January 1952 (age 74) Sabayevo, Bashkir ASSR, Russian SFSR, USSR
- Party: United Russia
- Education: Bashkir State Medical University

Rimma Amirovna Utyasheva (Russian: Римма Амировна Утяшева; born 3 January 1952, Sabayevo, Buzdyaksky District) is a Russian political figure and a deputy of the 8th State Duma.

In 1999, Utyashev was granted a Candidate of Sciences in Medicine degree. In 1975 she started working as obstetrician-gynecologist in Ufa. From 1978 to 1988, she was the department head at the clinical maternity hospital №4. From 1988 to 2008, she was the deputy head physician. In 2013, Utyasheva became Associate Professor of the Department of Obstetrics and Gynecology No. 1 of the Bashkir State Medical University. From 2008 to 2021, she was the deputy of the State Assembly of the Republic of Bashkortostan of the 4th, 5th, and 6th convocations. Since September 2021, she has served as deputy of the 8th State Duma.

== Sanctions ==
She was sanctioned by the UK government in 2022 in relation to the Russo-Ukrainian War.
