= Kyzyl-Yar, Buzdyaksky District, Republic of Bashkortostan =

Kyzyl-Yar Кызыл-Яр
- Village
- Location within Bashkortostan Location within Russia
- Coordinates: 54°54′N 54°28′E
- Country: Russia
- Region: Bashkortostan
- District: Buzdyaksky District
- Time zone: UTC+5:00

Kyzyl-Yar (Russian: Кызыл-Яр; Bashkir: Ҡыҙылъяр, Qıźılyar) is a rural locality (a village) in Tyuryushevsky Selsoviet, Buzdyaksky District, Bashkortostan, Russia. The population was 174 as of 2010. There is 1 street.

== Geography ==
Kyzyl-Yar is located 42 km north of Buzdyak (the district's administrative centre) by road. Sabayevo is the nearest rural locality.
