= Mikhail Kiselyov =

Russian politician

Mikhail Kiselyov MP
- Михаил Киселёв
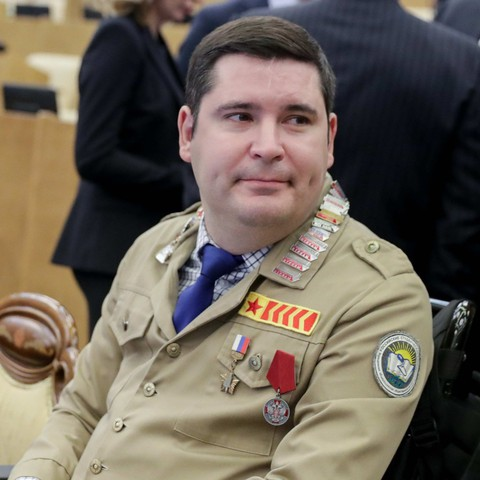

Member of the State Duma (Party List Seat)
- Incumbent
- Assumed office 12 October 2021

Personal details
- Born: 18 June 1986 (age 39) Novoselovo, Kolpashevsky District, RSFSR, USSR
- Party: United Russia
- Children: Ivan (b. 2014)
- Education: Tomsk Polytechnic University; Higher School of Economics; RANEPA
- Occupation: Engineer
- Website: киселёвмс.рф (in Russian)

Mikhail Sergeyevich Kiselyov (Note: also transliterated as Kiselev.) (Russian: Михаил Сергеевич Киселёв; born 18 June 1986, Novoselovo, Kolpashevsky District) is a Russian political figure and deputy of the 8th State Duma. He is a member of United Russia and sits on the Duma committee on Youth Policy.

From 2006 to 2008, he was a member of the Tomsk regional branch of the Russia's Student Teams organization. From 2010 to 2011, he held the position of Deputy Head of the Central Headquarters of the organization. In 2011–2021, Kiselyov was the head of the central headquarters of the Russia's Student Teams. In 2017, he was elected a member of the Civic Chamber of the Russian Federation. In the 2018 Russian presidential election, he was a confidant of Vladimir Putin. He is a member of the All-Russia People's Front. Since September 2021, he has served as deputy of the 8th State Duma.

In 2016, Mikhail Kiselev sustained a severe spinal injury. The spinal cord was damaged, resulting in loss of movement and sensation in his arms and legs. Recalling the incident, he stated that the injury occurred while jumping on a trampoline, an activity he had previously practiced as an acrobatics enthusiast. According to his account, he immediately realized he had fractured his neck and, drawing on first-aid training, instructed those around him on how to assist.

Since the injury, he has been using a wheelchair for mobility. He has been actively involved in promoting legislation aimed at improving accessibility for people with limited mobility.

== Sanctions ==
He was sanctioned by the UK government in 2022 in relation to the Russian invasion of Ukraine.
