= Vladimir Samokish =

Russian politician (born 1975)

Vladimir Samokish MP
- Владимир Самокиш
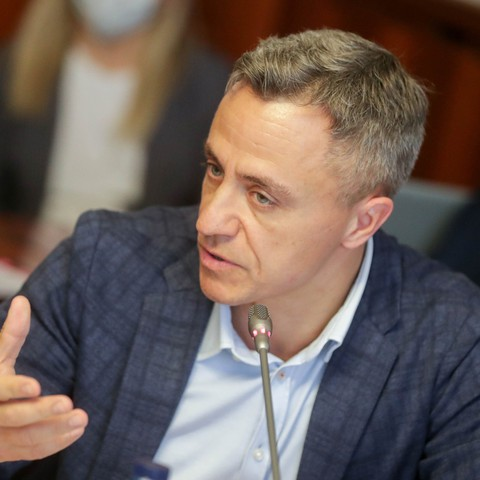

Member of the State Duma (Party List Seat)
- Incumbent
- Assumed office 12 October 2021

Personal details
- Born: 20 September 1975 (age 50) Tomsk, RSFSR, USSR
- Party: United Russia
- Education: Tomsk State University; RANEPA

Vladimir Igorevich Samokish (Russian: Владимир Игоревич Самокиш; born September 20, 1975, in Tomsk) is a Russian entrepreneur, political figure and deputy of the 8th State Duma. From 1993 to 2009, he worked as an individual entrepreneur and actively engaged in business. In 2009 he was appointed Deputy Governor of Tomsk Oblast. In 2015, he was elected deputy of the Tomsk City Duma. Since September 2021, he has served as deputy of the 8th State Duma.

In 2018, Samokish became the richest deputy of the Tomsk City Duma.

Samokish is married and has twins.

== Sanctions ==
He was sanctioned by the UK government in 2022 in relation to the Russo-Ukrainian War.

He is one of the 324 members of the State Duma the United States Treasury sanctioned on 24 March 2022 in response to the 2022 Russian invasion of Ukraine.
