= Veronika Vlasova =

Russian politician

Veronika Vlasova MP
- Вероника Власова
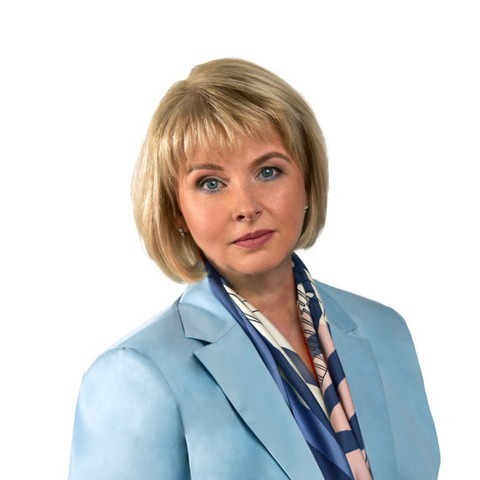

Member of the State Duma (Party List Seat)
- Incumbent
- Assumed office 12 October 2021

Personal details
- Born: 2 November 1966 (age 59) Kemerovo, RSFSR, USSR
- Party: United Russia
- Education: Kuzbass State Technical University; Kemerovo State Medical University; Kuzbass Regional Center for Psychological, Pedagogical, Medical and Social Assistance

Veronika Valerievna Vlasova (Russian: Вероника Валериевна Власова; born 2 November 1966, Kemerovo) is a Russian political figure and a deputy of the 8th State Duma.

From 1990 to 2021, Vlasova worked at the Kemerovo Regional Clinical Hospital, first as an intern doctor and, later, as obstetrician-gynaecologist of the gynaecological department. In November 2003, she was appointed head of the gynaecological department. In September - October 2012, she had an internship in the Netherlands as part of the Presidential Management Training Program. Since September 2021, she has served as deputy of the 8th State Duma.

She is a candidate of science in medicine, equivalent to a DPhil or PhD in anglophone countries, and sits on the committee on health protection in the State Duma.

== Sanctions ==
She was sanctioned by the UK government in 2022 in relation to the Russo-Ukrainian War.
