= Tatiana Larionova =

Russian politician

Tatiana Larionova MP
- Татьяна Ларионова
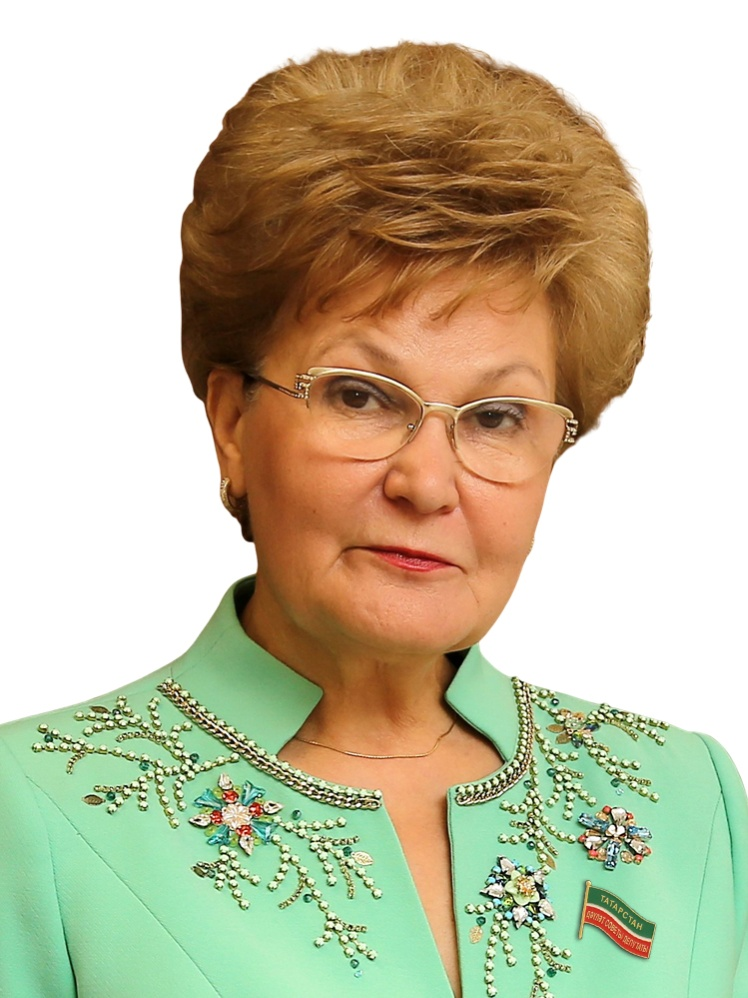

Member of the State Duma (Party List Seat)
- Incumbent
- Assumed office 12 October 2021

Personal details
- Born: 2 July 1955 (age 70) Kazan, Tatar ASSR, Russian SFSR, USSR
- Party: United Russia
- Education: Kazan Federal University; Kazan State Medical Institute

Tatiana Petrovna Larionova (Russian: Татьяна Петровна Ларионова; born 2 July 1955, Kazan) is a Russian political figure and deputy of the 8th State Duma. In 2005, she was granted a Candidate of Sciences in Sociology degree.

From 1983 to 1991, she worked in the Communist Party of the Soviet Union as an instructor, deputy head, head of the propaganda and agitation department, and second secretary of the Volga Federal District committee in Kazan. In 1991, Larionova started working in the Kazan city administration. From 2001 to 2006, she was the head of the Department of Social Protection of the Ministry of Labour, Employment and Social Protection of the Republic of Tatarstan. In November 2006, she was appointed state advisor to President of the Republic of Tatarstan Mintimer Shaimiev. From 2014 to 2021, she was the deputy of the State Council of the Republic of Tatarstan of the 5th and 6th convocations. Since September 2021, she has served as deputy of the 8th State Duma from the United Russia party list.

== Awards ==
- Order "For Merit to the Fatherland"
