= Stanislav Naumov =

Russian politician

Stanislav Naumov MP
- Станислав Наумов
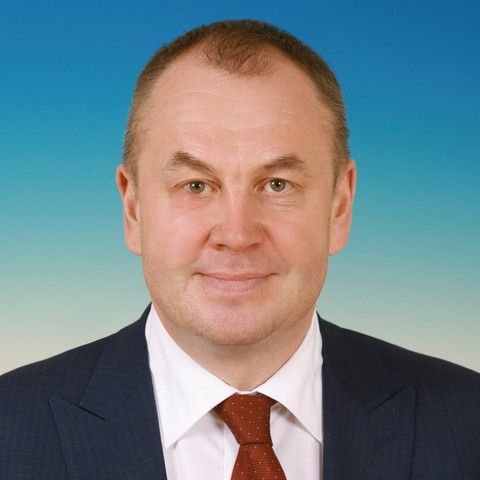
- official portrait, circa 2021

Member of the State Duma (Party List Seat)
- Incumbent
- Assumed office 12 October 2021

Personal details
- Born: 4 October 1972 (age 54) Magnitogorsk, Chelyabinsk Oblast, Russian SFSR, USSR
- Party: Liberal Democratic Party of Russia
- Education: Ural State University

Stanislav Alexandrovich Naumov (Russian: Станислав Александрович Наумов; born 4 October 1972) is a Russian political figure and a deputy of the 8th State Duma.

From 1992 to 1997, Naumov worked as a press secretary of the mayor of Magnitogorsk. From 1997 to 1998, he was an advisor to Alexander Pochinok. From 1998 to 1999, he was Vice-Rector of the International banking Institute. From 1999 to 2004, he was an advisor to Russian politician and the chairman of the board of the Eurasian Economic Commission Viktor Khristenko. From 2010 to 2020, he was the president of the Russian Association for Public Relations. From 2010 to 2017, he was the Head of the Department of Philosophy at the National Research Nuclear University MEPhI (Moscow Engineering Physics Institute). In March 2015, Naumov became the Director for Government Relations at X5 Retail Group. In 2021, he joined the Liberal Democratic Party of Russia. Since September 2021, he has served as deputy of the 8th State Duma.

== Awards ==
- Medal “For Contribution to the Development of the Eurasian Economic Union” (May 29, 2019, Supreme Eurasian Economic Council)
- Jubilee Medal “IPA CIS. 30 Years” (November 16, 2023, Interparliamentary Assembly of the CIS) — for merits in the development and strengthening of parliamentarism, for contributions to the development and improvement of the legal foundations of the Commonwealth of Independent States, and for strengthening international relations and interparliamentary cooperation.

== Sanctions ==
He was sanctioned by the UK government in 2022 in relation to the Russo-Ukrainian War.
