= Larisa Buranova =

Russian politician (born 1969)

Larisa Buranova MP
- Лариса Буранова
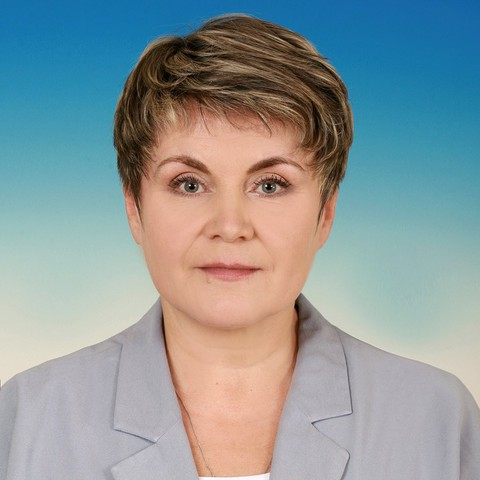
- official portrait, circa 2021

Member of the State Duma (Party List Seat)
- Incumbent
- Assumed office 12 October 2021

Personal details
- Born: 3 April 1969 (age 57) Izhevsk, Udmurt ASSR, Russian SFSR, USSR
- Party: United Russia
- Education: Udmurt State University; Russian Academy of Public Administration
- Occupation: Teacher

Larisa Nikolaevna Buranova (Russian: Лариса Николаевна Буранова; born 3 April 1969) is a Russian political figure, deputy of the State Duma of the 8th convocation.

== Early life and education ==
She was born on 3 April 1969 in Izhevsk, the capital of Udmurtia. In 1991 she graduated from the Udmurt State University with a major in history. She further completed a graduate degree equivalent to a Master of Public Administration in 1999 through the Russian Academy of Public Administration, which has since been absorbed into RANEPA.

== Career ==
From 1991 to 1995, Buranova worked as a history teacher. In 1995 she was assigned the head specialist of the committee on nationalities under the government of Udmurtia. In 1999, when the committee was transformed into the Republican Ministry of National Policy, she was appointed head of the department. From 2008 to 2014, she worked as the First Deputy Minister of National Policies. In 2014 she was appointed the Minister of National Policies of Udmurtia.

In the September 2021 Russian legislative election, Buranova ran for the State Duma on the party list of United Russia. While she wasn't initially allocated a seat, however, as a result of several vacancies, she was moved up on the list before the start of the 8th State Duma on 12 October 2021. In her capacity as deputy, she is a member of the State Duma Committee on Nationalities.

== Sanctions ==
In December 2022 the EU sanctioned Larisa Buranova in relation to the 2022 Russian invasion of Ukraine.
