= Sergey Panteleev =

Russian politician (born 1951)

Sergey Panteleev MP
- Сергей Пантелеев
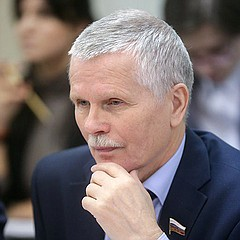

Member of the State Duma (Party List Seat)
- Incumbent
- Assumed office 5 October 2016

Personal details
- Born: 4 July 1951 (age 75) Zapolye, Babayevsky District, Vologda Oblast, RSFSR, USSR
- Party: Communist Party of the Russian Federation
- Education: St. Petersburg Institute of Mechanical Engineering; International Banking Institute

Sergey Mikhailovich Panteleev (Russian: Сергей Михайлович Пантелеев; born 4 July 1951, Zapolye, Babayevsky District) is a Russian political figure and a deputy of the 7th and 8th State Dumas.

From 1973 to 2016, Panteleev worked at the Kirov Plant in Leningrad. In 2016, he was elected deputy of the 7th State Duma. Since September 2021, he has served as deputy of the 8th State Duma from the Saint Petersburg constituency.

== Sanctions ==
He was sanctioned by the UK government in 2022 in relation to the Russo-Ukrainian War.
