= Andrey Parfyonov =

Russian politician (born 1976)

- Андрей Парфёнов
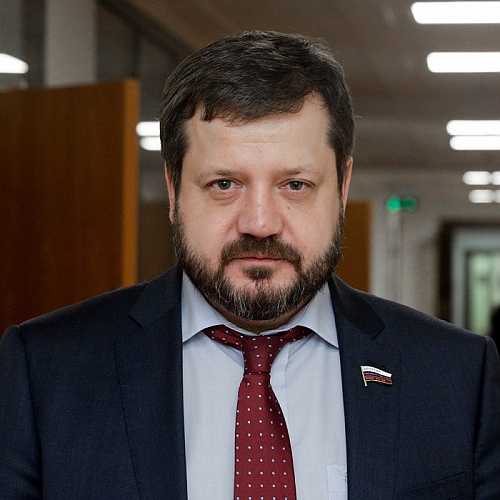

Member of the State Duma
- Incumbent
- Assumed office 2 November 2022

Personal details
- Born: Andrey Borisovich Parfyonov; 10 April 1976 (age 49) Smolensk, Soviet Union
- Party: United Russia

Andrey Borisovich Parfyonov (Russian: Андрей Борисович Парфёнов; born 10 April 1976) is a Russian politician, who is currently a member of the State Duma of the eighth convocation, and a member of the United Russia faction.

== Biography ==
Andrey Parfyonov was born on 10 April 1976 in Smolensk to his father, Boris Ivanovich and his mother, Nina Andreyevna. Boris stood at the origins of the Smolensk regional branch of the Yabloko party and for many years was its chairman. He was nominated in elections at various levels from the party (including several times to the State Duma). As of November 2022, Boris is a member of the regional council of the Smolensk branch of the Yabloko party. Nina is a member of the control and revision commission of the branch of the Yabloko party.

In 2000, Andrey Parfyonov graduated from the Moscow Power Engineering Institute, in 2002 he underwent retraining at the Moscow State University at the Faculty of Psychology.

From 2007 to 2012, Parfyonov was the Chief Specialist of the Department for Interaction with Local Self-Government Bodies, Deputy Head of the Department of Electoral Technologies of the Department of Regional Development of the Department of Regional Work, Head, Deputy Head of the Department - Head of the Department of Electoral Technologies of the Department of Electoral Processes, Head of the Department of Electoral Processes of the Department of Regional Work of the Office of the Central Executive Committee (CEC), from the All-Russian political party "United Russia".

From 2012 to 2021, Parfyonov was the Deputy Head of the Central Executive Committee of the All-Russian Political Party "United Russia" - Head of the Department of Regional and Technological Work of the Office of the Central Executive Committee of the "United Russia" party.

On 31 October 2022, the General Council of United Russia decided to transfer the mandate of the State Duma deputy from the Tula Oblast Nikolay Petrunin to Parfyonov. On 2 November 2022, the CEC of the Russian Federation at its meeting No. 101 approved the decision to transfer the mandate to Parfyonov.
