= Georgy Arapov =

Russian politician (born 1999)

Georgy Arapov MP
- Георгий Арапов
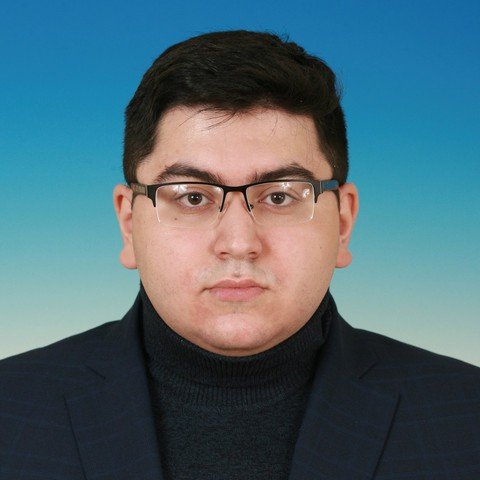

Member of the State Duma (Party List Seat)
- Incumbent
- Assumed office 12 October 2021

Personal details
- Born: 11 September 1999 (age 25); Nor Hachn, Armenia
- Political party: New People
- Education: Plekhanov Russian University of Economics
- Occupation: politician

Georgy Konstantinovich Arapov (born 11 September 1999) is a Russian politician who was elected to the State Duma on the federal list for the New People party in 2021.

== Biography ==
Georgy Arapov was born on September 11, 1999, in the city of Nor-Achin, Republic of Armenia. One year after his birth, his family moved to Moscow. In 2021, Arapov graduated from the Plekhanov Russian University of Economics and became the head of the regional branch of the New People party in the Irkutsk Region. On September 19, 2021, he was elected as a deputy of the 8th State Duma. He was appointed Deputy Chairman of the State Duma Committee on Ecology, Natural Resources, and Environmental Protection.

He is the youngest member of the 8th State Duma.

== Sanctions ==
He was sanctioned by the UK government in 2022 in relation to the Russo-Ukrainian War.
