= Ruslan Gadzhiev =

Russian politician (born 1978)

Ruslan Gadzhiev MP
- Руслан Гаджиев
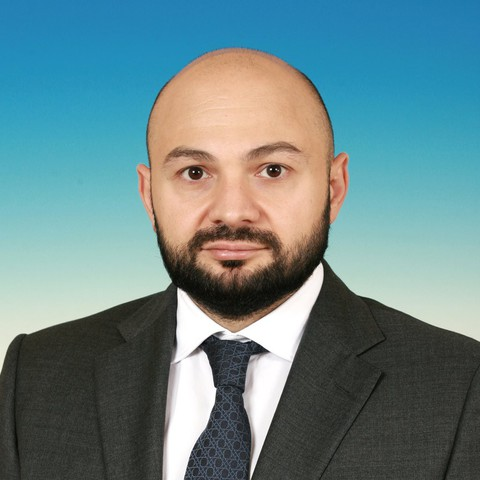

Member of the State Duma (Party List Seat)
- Incumbent
- Assumed office 12 October 2021

Personal details
- Born: 29 August 1978 (age 47) Derbent, Dagestan ASSR, RSFSR, Soviet Union
- Party: United Russia
- Education: Moscow State University; Gubkin Russian State University of Oil and Gas; RANEPA

Ruslan Gadzhievich Gadzhiev (Russian: Руслан Гаджиевич Гаджиев; born 29 August 1978, Derbent, Dagestan ASSR) is a Russian politician and deputy of the 8th State Duma.

== Early life and education ==
Gadzhiev was born on 29 August 1978 in Derbent, Dagestan ASSR. In 1999, he graduated from the Law School of Moscow State University.

== Career ==
After graduation, Gadzhiev worked for more than ten years in the prosecutor’s office and the tax administration. He later became Deputy General Director of the Industrial Development Fund of Moscow.

== Political career ==
In September 2021, Gadzhiev was elected deputy of the 8th State Duma from the United Russia party list.

== Sanctions ==
He was sanctioned by the UK government in 2022 in relation to the Russo-Ukrainian War.

He is one of the members of the State Duma the United States Department of the Treasury sanctioned on 24 March 2022 in response to the 2022 Russian invasion of Ukraine.
