= Natalya Kaptelinina =

Russian politician (born 1984)

- Наталья Каптелинина
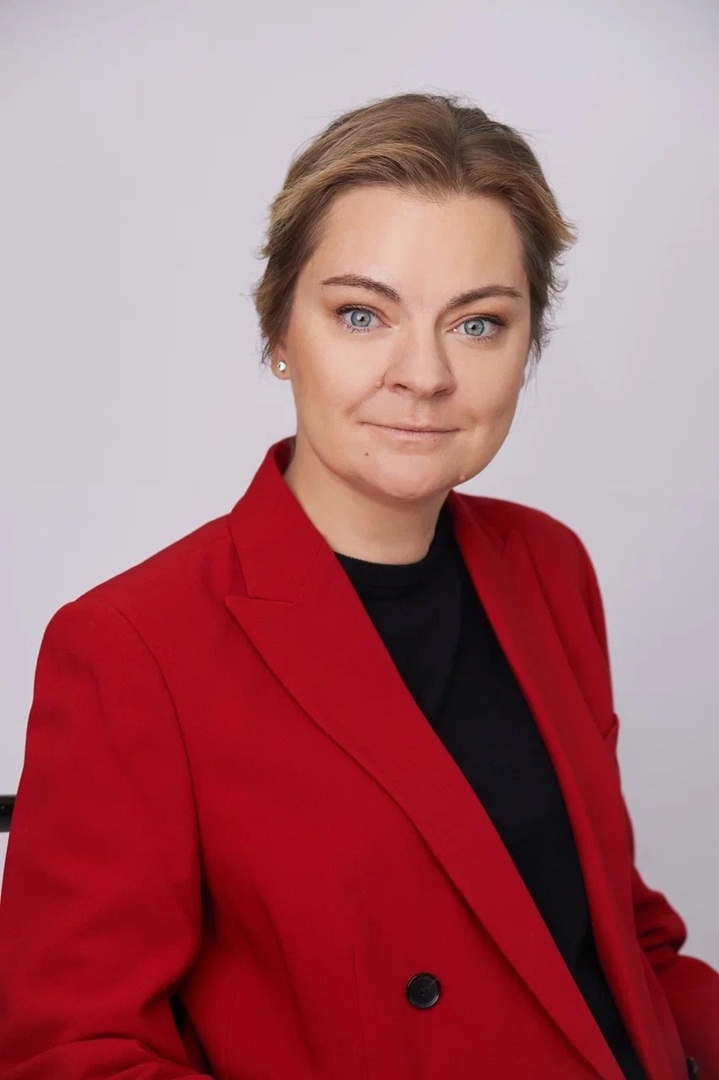
- Kaptelinina in 2024

Member of the State Duma
- Incumbent
- Assumed office 2024
- Preceded by: Artur Chilingarov
- Constituency: Party List

Personal details
- Born: 15 June 1984 (age 42) Krasnoyarsk, Russian SFSR, Soviet Union
- Party: United Russia

Natalya Olegovna Kaptelinina (Russian: Наталья Олеговна Каптелинина; born 15 June 1984) is a Russian politician. She has been a deputy of the State Duma of the VIII convocation from United Russia since 2024.

== Biography ==
Kaptelinina was born on 15 June 1984 in Krasnoyarsk. In 2006, she graduated from the Krasnoyarsk State University of Non-Ferrous Metals and Gold, specializing in Public and Municipal Administration. She worked in the Finance Department of the Krasnoyarsk Administration (2006), in Step LLC (2006-2007), in SBS LLC (since 2015). In 2018, she became a deputy of the Krasnoyarsk City Council and a member of the Chamber of Young Legislators under the Federation Council. In 2023 she was re-elected to the city council. Due to an accident, Kaptelinina uses a wheelchair. She created the Step by Step to a Dream project, the goal of which is to adapt Krasnoyarsk gyms to the needs of people with disabilities.

In 2021, Kaptelinina participated in the elections to the State Duma, occupying the third position in one of the regional lists of United Russia. In June 2024, she received the mandate of a State Duma deputy, vacated after the death of Artur Chilingarov (prior to this, there were reports that the mandate would go to Elena Penzina, a deputy of the Legislative Assembly of Krasnoyarsk Krai).
