= Ivan Babich =

Russian politician (born 1982)

Ivan Babich MP
- Иван Бабич
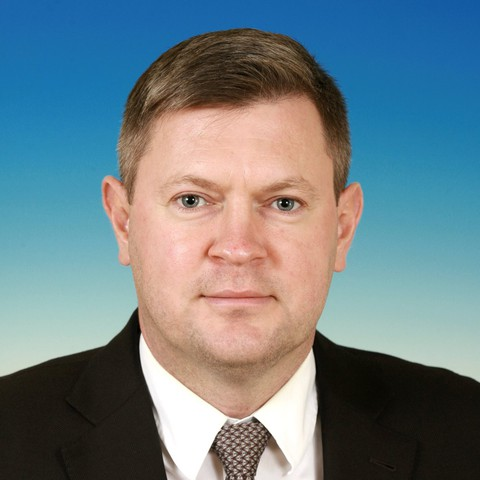
- official portrait, circa 2021

Member of the State Duma (Party List Seat)
- Incumbent
- Assumed office 12 October 2021

Personal details
- Born: 2 September 1982 (age 44) Nazarovo, Krasnoyarsk Krai, Russian SFSR, Soviet Union
- Party: Communist Party of the Russian Federation
- Education: Siberian Federal University

Ivan Nikolaevich Babich (Russian: Иван Николаевич Бабич; born 2 September 1982, Nazarovo, Krasnoyarsk Krai) is a Russian political figure and a deputy of the 8th State Duma.

In 2009, Babich graduated from the Siberian Federal University. After that, he engaged in entrepreneurship and was a co-owner, general director of RZD Region Service LLC, Hozopttorg LLC, Dealer LLC. He was a co-founder of the Kredit Express bank in Rostov-on-Don. Since September 2021, he has served as deputy of the 8th State Duma.

== Sanctions ==
He was sanctioned by the UK government in 2022 in relation to the Russo-Ukrainian War.
