= Maria Vasilkova =

Russian politician

Maria Vasilkova MP
- Мария Василькова
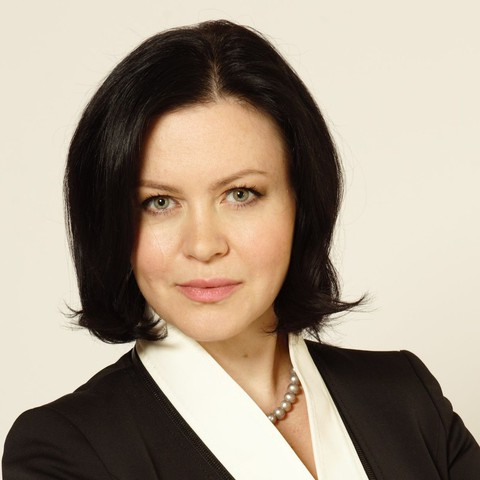

Member of the State Duma (Party List Seat)
- Incumbent
- Assumed office 12 October 2021

Personal details
- Born: 13 February 1978 (age 48) Megion, Khanty-Mansi Autonomous Okrug, Tyumen Oblast, RSFSR, USSR
- Party: United Russia
- Education: Irkutsk State Economic Academy; Skolkovo Moscow School of Management

Maria Victorovna Vasilkova (Russian: Мария Викторовна Василькова, born 13 February 1978 in Megion, Tyumen Oblast) is a Russian politician from United Russia and a deputy of the 8th State Duma.

From 2008 to 2011, Vasilkova worked as the general director of the Moscow investment company Analysis. Finance. Investments LLC. She left the post to become financial director of Sokolskaya slab company - OSB LLC. In 2014-2021, she was the senior investment director of AFK Sistema and vice president of strategy. Since September 2021, she has served as deputy of the 8th State Duma.

== Biography ==
Maria Vasilkova was born on 13 February 1978 in the settlement of Megion, Khanty-Mansi Autonomous Okrug, Tyumen Oblast. In 2000, she graduated from the Baikal State University of Economics and Law with a degree in State and Municipal Administration. In 2002, she completed postgraduate studies in Economics and National Economy Management, in 2017 graduated from the Moscow School of Management Skolkovo under the Executive MBA program, and in 2021 completed the personnel management development program of the Higher School of Public Administration of the Russian Presidential Academy of National Economy and Public Administration (RANEPA).

She worked as director of the investment management company Analysis. Finance. Investments in Moscow (2007–2011),[2] financial director of OOO Delo (2011–2012, Moscow), and OOO Sokolskaya Plitnaya Kompaniya-OSP (2011–2014, Sokol, Vologda Oblast). From 2014 to 2021, she held the positions of deputy general director, vice-president, management board member, and advisor to the president of OOO LP Management (since May 2016 — OOO UK Segezha Group). Between 2019 and 2021, she was senior investment director of AFK Sistema. In 2020, she won the Leaders of Russia competition.

On 19 September 2021, Vasilkova was elected to the State Duma by party list from United Russia, representing Irkutsk Oblast. She joined the Committee on Industry and Trade.

== Sanctions ==
She is sanctioned by the Biden Administration.

She was sanctioned by the UK government in 2022 in relation to the Russo-Ukrainian War.
