= Vladimir Senin =

Russian politician (born 1960)

Vladimir Senin MP
- Владимир Сенин

Member of the State Duma (Party List Seat)
- Incumbent
- Assumed office 12 October 2021

Personal details
- Born: 17 September 1960 (age 66) Moscow, RSFSR, USSR
- Party: United Russia
- Education: Moscow Institute of Management; Moscow State Law Academy

Vladimir Borisovich Senin (Russian: Владимир Борисович Сенин; September 17, 1960, Moscow) is a Russian political figure and deputy of the 8th State Duma. In 2005, he was granted a Candidate of Sciences Degree in Juridical Science.

From 1991 to 1993, Senin held high-ranking positions in the system of executive power of Moscow. In 1994-1995, he was the head of the analytical sector of the State Duma apparatus. From 1996 to 2002, he was the deputy head of the Department of Affairs of the Office of the Federation Council. From 2003 to 2005, Senin worked as deputy head of the Department for Relations with Government Authorities of Alfa-Bank. In 2005-2011, he was appointed senior vice president of the Alfa-Bank. Since September 2021, he has served as deputy of the 8th State Duma.

== Sanctions ==
He was sanctioned by the UK government in 2022 in relation to the Russo-Ukrainian War.

He is one of the members of the State Duma the United States Treasury sanctioned on 24 March 2022 in response to the 2022 Russian invasion of Ukraine.
