= Yuliya Drozhzhina =

Russian politician (born 1990)

- Юлия Дрожжина
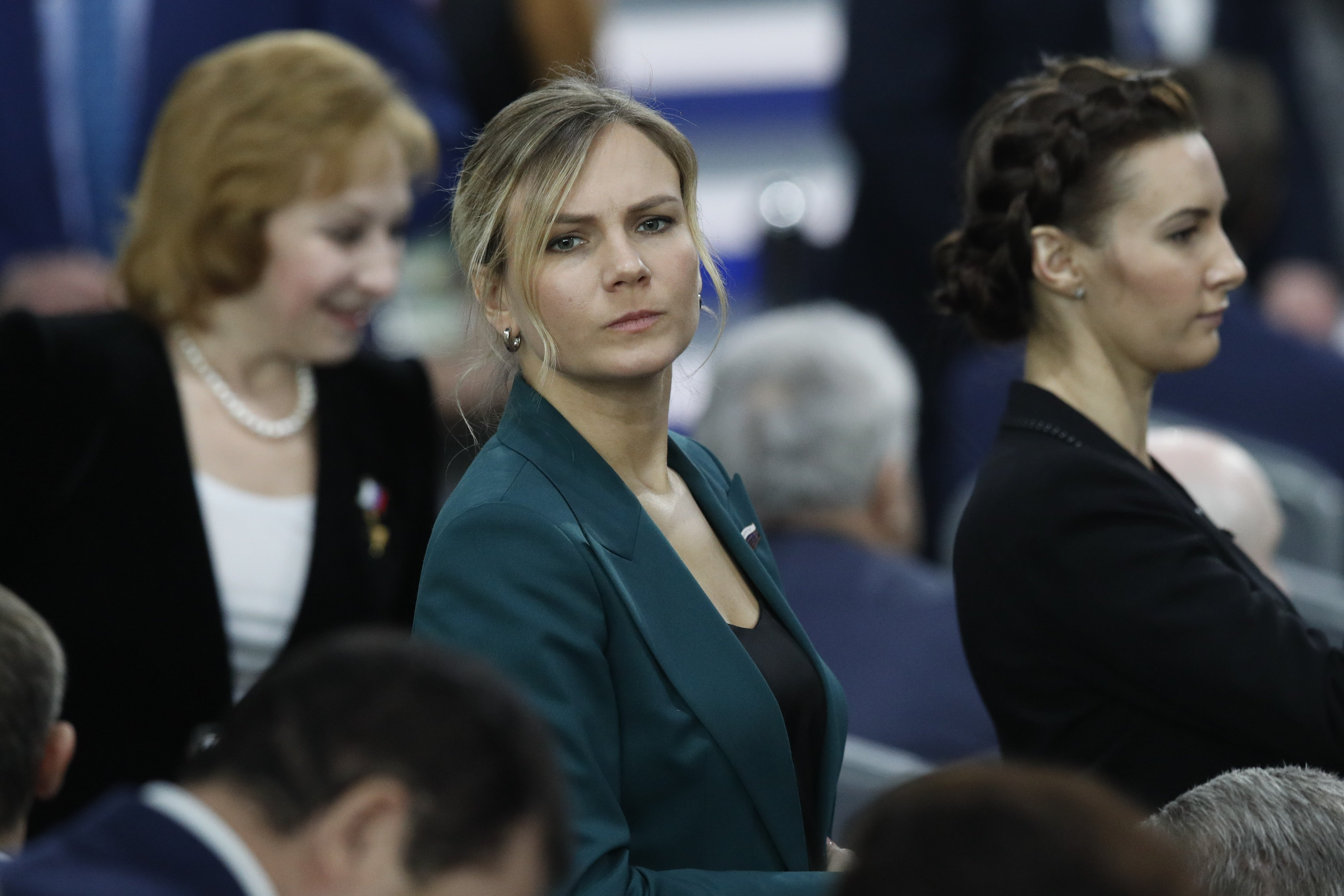
- Drozhzhina in 2023

Deputy of the 8th State Duma
- Incumbent
- Assumed office 19 September 2021

Personal details
- Born: 1 March 1990 (age 36) Zarinsk, Altai Krai, Russian Soviet Federative Socialist Republic, USSR
- Party: United Russia
- Education: Altai State Technical University

Yuliya Drozhzhina (Russian: Юлия Николаевна Дрожжина; born 1 March 1990, Zarinsk, Altai Krai) is a Russian political figure and a deputy of the 8th State Duma.

From 2014 to 2016, Drozhzhina was the head of the organizational department of the Russian National Youth Organization "Russian Students' Teams". In 2016, she was appointed head of the Moscow branch of the organization. In 2018, she coordinated volunteers during the Vladimir Putin's presidential campaign.

Since 2021, she has served as a deputy of the 8th State Duma from the Moscow constituency. She ran with the United Russia. Initially, Yulia Drozhzhina did not make it to the party lists. However, three people before her rejected their mandates, and she received the place on 7 October. Drozhzhina became the last registered deputy of the 8th State Duma. She became a member of the State Duma Committee on Health Protection.

== Sanctions ==
She is one of the members of the State Duma the United States Treasury sanctioned on 24 March 2022 in response to the 2022 Russian invasion of Ukraine.

She was sanctioned by Canada under the Special Economic Measures Act (S.C. 1992, c. 17) in relation to the Russian invasion of Ukraine for Grave Breach of International Peace and Security, and by the UK government in 2022 in relation to Russo-Ukrainian War.
