= Alla Polyakova =

Russian politician

- Алла Полякова

Deputy of the 8th State Duma
- Incumbent
- Assumed office 19 September 2021

Personal details
- Born: 26 November 1970 (age 55) Ryazan, Russian Soviet Federative Socialist Republic, USSR
- Party: United Russia
- Education: Plekhanov Russian University of Economics

Alla Polyakova (Russian: Алла Викторовна Полякова; born November 26, 1970, in Ryazan) is a Russian political figure, entrepreneur, and a deputy of the 8th State Duma.

Starting from the second half of the 1990s, Polyakova held senior positions in different commercial enterprises. From 2002 to 2011, she headed the major wholesale supplier of textile products named "Solzhers." Since September 2021, she has served as deputy of the 8th State Duma.

Polyakova is allegedly a sister of a former Russian Ambassador to Belarus (2018-2019) Mikhail Babich.

In 2019, Forbes included Polyakova in the list of the 100 wealthiest Russian deputies and civil servants.

== Sanctions ==
She was sanctioned by Canada under the Special Economic Measures Act (S.C. 1992, c. 17) in relation to the Russian invasion of Ukraine for Grave Breach of International Peace and Security, and by the UK government in 2022 in relation to Russo-Ukrainian War.
