= Olga Anufriyeva =

Russian politician

Olga Anufriyeva MP
- Ольга Ануфриева
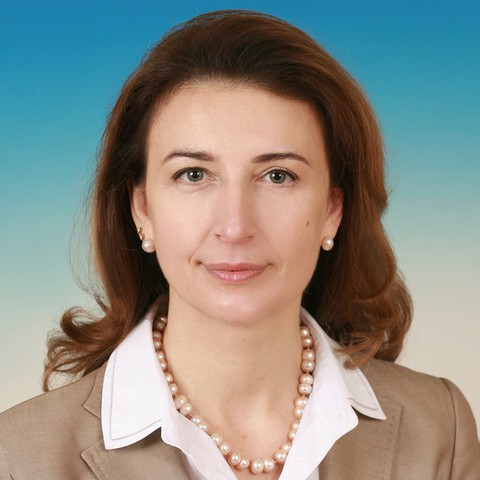

Member of the State Duma (Party List Seat)
- Incumbent
- Assumed office 12 October 2021

Personal details
- Born: 18 August 1974 (age 52) Moscow, RSFSR, USSR
- Party: United Russia
- Education: State University of Management

Olga Nikolayevna Anufriyeva (Russian: Ольга Николаевна Ануфриева; born 18 August 1974) is a Russian politician. Since 2021, she has served as a deputy of the 8th State Duma.

== Early life and education ==
Anufriyeva was born on 18 August 1974 in Moscow. In 1996, she graduated from the State University of Management.

== Career ==
In 1998, she began working as an assistant minister to the Minister of Taxes and Duties of the Russian Federation.

Since 2000, Anufriyeva has been a member of various expert state committees and working groups on taxation matters.

On 19 September 2021, she was elected deputy of the 8th State Duma, representing the Khanty-Mansi Autonomous Okrug as a candidate of the United Russia party.

== Sanctions ==
She is one of the members of the State Duma the United States Treasury sanctioned on 24 March 2022 in response to the 2022 Russian invasion of Ukraine.

She is also under international sanctions imposed by the European Union, the United Kingdom, and several other countries.
