= Kaplan Panesh =

Russian politician

Kaplan Panesh MP
- Каплан Панеш

Member of the State Duma (Party List Seat)
- Incumbent
- Assumed office 12 October 2021

Personal details
- Born: 4 September 1974 (age 52) Adygeysk, Adyghe Autonomous Oblast, Russian SFSR, USSR
- Party: Liberal Democratic Party of Russia
- Education: Moscow State Pedagogical University; Adyghe State University (DPhil)
- Awards: Order of Friendship

Kaplan Mugdinovich Panesh (Russian: Каплан Мугдинович Панеш; born September 4, 1974, Adygeysk) is a Russian political figure and a deputy of the 8th State Duma.

At the beginning of the 2000s, Panesh engaged in business and worked as general director of Kubannefteservis LLC. Later he held various positions at various industrial enterprises of Krasnodar Krai and Adygea. In 2006, he became the general director of the Maykop Brewery. From 2011 to 2021, Panesh was the deputy of the State Council of the Republic of Adygea of the 5th and 6th convocations. From September 2021 to September 2026, he has served as deputy of the 8th State Duma. and during the 2026 Russian legislative election he was elected a deputy to the 9th State Duma.

== Sanctions ==
He was sanctioned by the UK government in 2022 in relation to the Russo-Ukrainian War.
