= Roman Lyubarsky =

Russian politician (born 1980)

Roman Lyubarsky MP
- Роман Любарский
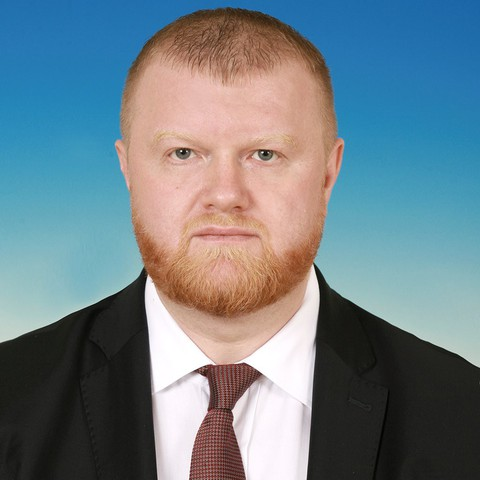
- official portrait, circa 2021

Member of the State Duma (Party List Seat)
- Incumbent
- Assumed office 12 October 2021

Personal details
- Born: 16 July 1980 (age 46) Arzamas-16, Gorky Oblast, RSFSR, USSR
- Party: United Russia
- Education: Minin University

Roman Valerievich Lyubarsky (Russian: Роман Валерьевич Любарский; born 16 July 1980, Arzamas-16) is a Russian political figure and a deputy of the 8th State Duma.

From 2008 to 2009, he was the chief specialist, deputy head, head of the party building department of the apparatus of the regional executive committee of the Nizhny Novgorod regional branch of the United Russia. From 2009 to 2012, Lyubarsky held the positions of the Deputy Head of the Party Building Department of the Department of Regional Work, Deputy Head of the Central Election Commission of the United Russia Party, Head of the Regional Work Department of the Party Central Election Commission. In 2012-2016, he worked in the apparatus of the plenipotentiary representative of the President of the Russian Federation in the Volga Federal District. From 2016 to 2019, Lyubarsky was the Minister of Internal Regional and Municipal Policy of the Nizhny Novgorod Oblast. Since September 2021, he has served as deputy of the 8th State Duma.

== Sanctions ==
He was sanctioned by the UK government in 2022 in relation to the Russo-Ukrainian War.

He is one of the members of the State Duma the United States Treasury sanctioned on 24 March 2022 in response to the 2022 Russian invasion of Ukraine.
