= Amir Hamitov =

Russian politician (born 1975)

Amir Hamitov MP
- Амир Хамитов
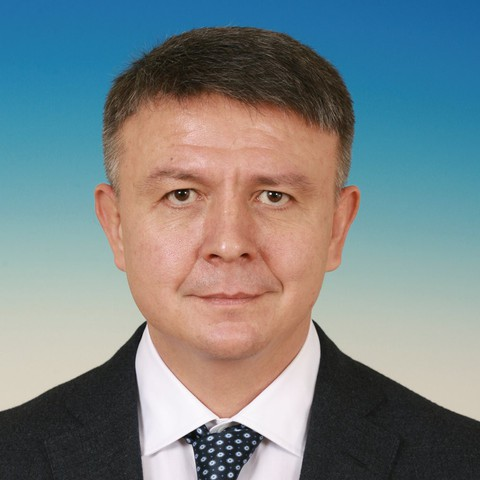

Member of the State Duma (Party List Seat)
- Incumbent
- Assumed office 12 October 2021

Personal details
- Born: 4 February 1975 (age 51)
- Party: New People
- Education: RANEPA

Amir Makhsudovich Hamitov (Note: Also transliterated as Khamitov.) (Russian: Амир Махсудович Хамитов; born 4 February 1975) is a Russian political figure and a deputy of the 8th State Duma.

After graduating from the Russian Presidential Academy of National Economy and Public Administration, Hamitov engaged in business and was a co-founder of the Moscow Uniled CJSC and Uniled-tech, and Non-bank credit organization "Mobile card" LLC. Since September 2021, he has served as deputy of the 8th State Duma. On 12 October 2021 he was appointed Deputy Chairman of the State Duma Committee on Physical Culture and Sports.

== Awards ==
Badge "Excellence in Physical Culture and Sports" (January 15, 2025)

== Sanctions ==
He was sanctioned by the UK government in 2022 in relation to the Russo-Ukrainian War.
