= Vladimir Ilinykh =

Russian politician (born 1975)

Vladimir Ilinykh MP
- Владимир Ильиных
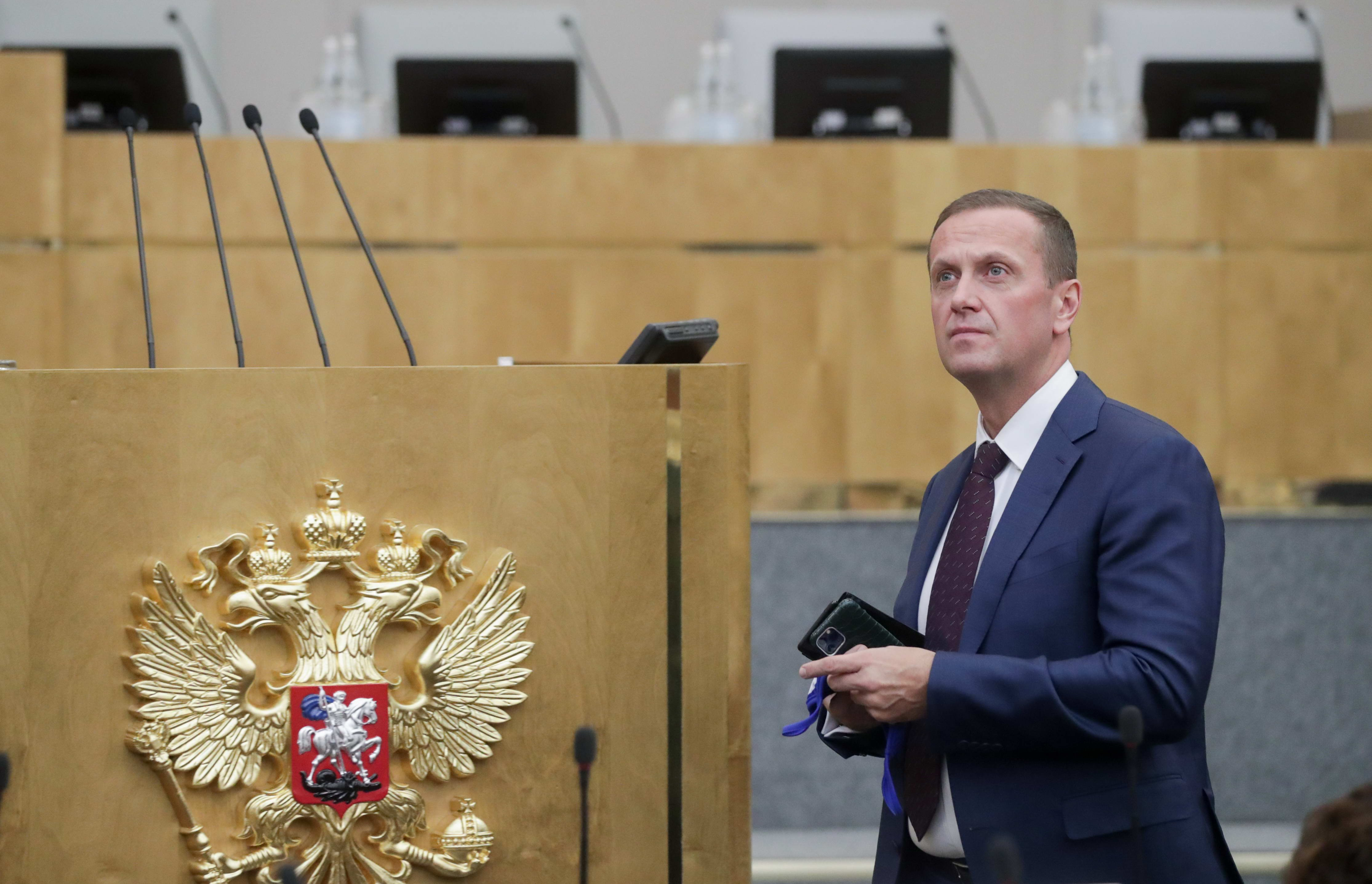

Member of the State Duma (Party List Seat)
- Incumbent
- Assumed office 12 October 2021

Head of Orenburg
- In office 6 February 2020 – 28 september 2021
- Preceded by: Dmitry Kalugin
- Succeeded by: Sergey Salmin

Personal details
- Born: 20 May 1975 (age 50) Severouralsk, Sverdlovsk Oblast, Russian SFSR, USSR
- Party: United Russia
- Education: Ural State Mining University

Vladimir Alexeyevich Ilinykh (Russian: Владимир Алексеевич Ильиных; born 20 May 1975, Severouralsk, Sverdlovsk Oblast) is a Russian political figure and a deputy of 8th State Duma.

From 1995 to 2012, he was engaged in business. On 4 March 2012 he was elected deputy of the Duma of the Severouralsky Urban Okrug. In December of the same year, he left the post to become First Deputy Head of Administration of the Severouralsky Urban Okrug. From May 2014 to December 2016, he headed the administration. On 18 September 2016 he was elected deputy of the Legislative Assembly of Sverdlovsk Oblast. On 6 February 2020 he was elected the head of Orenburg. During the 2021 Russian legislative election, Ilinykh did not initially receive a deputy mandate. However, because several members of the party list who received mandates declined them, he was moved up and acquired one before the start of the new term. In his capacity as a deputy, he belongs to the Duma Committee on Far East and Arctic Development.

On September 28, 2021, he submitted his resignation from the post of mayor.

== Sanctions ==
He was sanctioned by the UK government in 2022 in relation to the Russo-Ukrainian War.

He is one of the members of the State Duma the United States Treasury sanctioned on 24 March 2022 in response to the 2022 Russian invasion of Ukraine.
