= Viktoria Rodina =

Russian politician

- Виктория Родина

Deputy of the 8th State Duma
- Incumbent
- Assumed office 19 September 2021

Personal details
- Born: 29 October 1989 (age 36) Prokhladny, Kabardino-Balkarian Autonomous Soviet Socialist Republic, Russian Soviet Federative Socialist Republic, USSR
- Party: United Russia
- Education: Kabardino-Balkarian State University

Victoria Rodina (Russian: Виктория Сергеевна Родина; born 29 October 1989, Prokhladny, Kabardino-Balkarian Republic) is a Russian political figure and a deputy of the 8th State Duma.

From 2012 to 2021, Rodina worked as coach at the specialized in athletics children's and youth sports school of the Olympic reserve. In 2016, she founded the charitable foundation "The World Where Good Is". The Foundation aims at assisting children with disabilities, orphans, children from large and low-income families, as well as children who find themselves in difficult situations. In 2016-2021, Rodina was the deputy of the Council of Local Self-Government of Prokhladny Urban District of the Kabardino-Balkarian Republic of the 6th convocation. Since September 2021, she has served as a deputy of the 8th State Duma.

Sanctions

From 11 March 2022 Rodina was subjected to United Kingdom sanctions in relation to Russia's actions in Ukraine.

On 24 March 2022, the United States Treasury sanctioned her in response to the 2022 Russian invasion of Ukraine.
