= Galina Danchikova =

Russian politician (born 1954)

Galina Danchikova MP
- Галина Данчикова
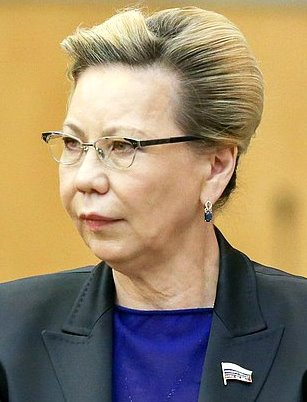

Member of the State Duma (Party List Seat)
- Incumbent
- Assumed office 5 October 2016

Personal details
- Born: 13 August 1954 (age 71) Khairyuzovka, Balagansky District, Irkutsk Oblast, RSFSR, USSR
- Party: United Russia
- Education: Yakut Finance and Credit College; All-Union Legal Correspondence Institute; MinFin Central Financial Courses

Galina Innokentievna Danchikova (Russian: Галина Иннокентьевна Данчикова; born August 13, 1954, Khairyuzovka, Balagansky District) is a Russian political figure and a deputy of the 8th State Duma. In 2001 she was awarded a Doctor of Sciences degree in economics.

From 1979 to 1989, she was the head of budget and Deputy Head of the Verkhoyansk Regional Financial Department of the Yakut Autonomous Soviet Socialist Republic. In 1991–1992, she served as a Deputy Chairman of the Presidium of the Verkhoyansk District Council, and later she was appointed the deputy head of the administration. From 1993 to 2002, she worked as the first deputy of the acting minister of finance of Yakutia. In 2010, she was appointed the chairman of The Government of the Republic. She left the post as she was elected the deputy of the 7th State Duma. In 2021, she was re-elected for the State Duma of the 8th convocation.

== Legislative activity ==
From 2016 to 2019, during her term as a deputy of the 7th State Duma of the Russian Federation, she co-authored 111 legislative initiatives and amendments to draft federal laws.

== Awards and honours ==
- "Honored Worker of the National Economy of the Republic of Sakha (Yakutia)"
- Order of the Republic of Sakha (Yakutia) "Polar Star"
- Honorary badge "Excellent student of the state civil service of the Republic of Sakha (Yakutia)"
- Distinction Badge "Civil Valor"

== Personal life ==
Galina Danchikova has a son, Yevgeny Alexandrovich Danchikov (born 1976). He is the Head of the Main Control Department of the city of Moscow.

== Sanctions ==
She is one of the members of the State Duma the United States Treasury sanctioned on 24 March 2022 in response to the 2022 Russian invasion of Ukraine.

He was sanctioned by the UK government in 2022 in relation to the Russo-Ukrainian War.
