= Ivan Solodovnikov =

Russian politician

- Иван Солодовников
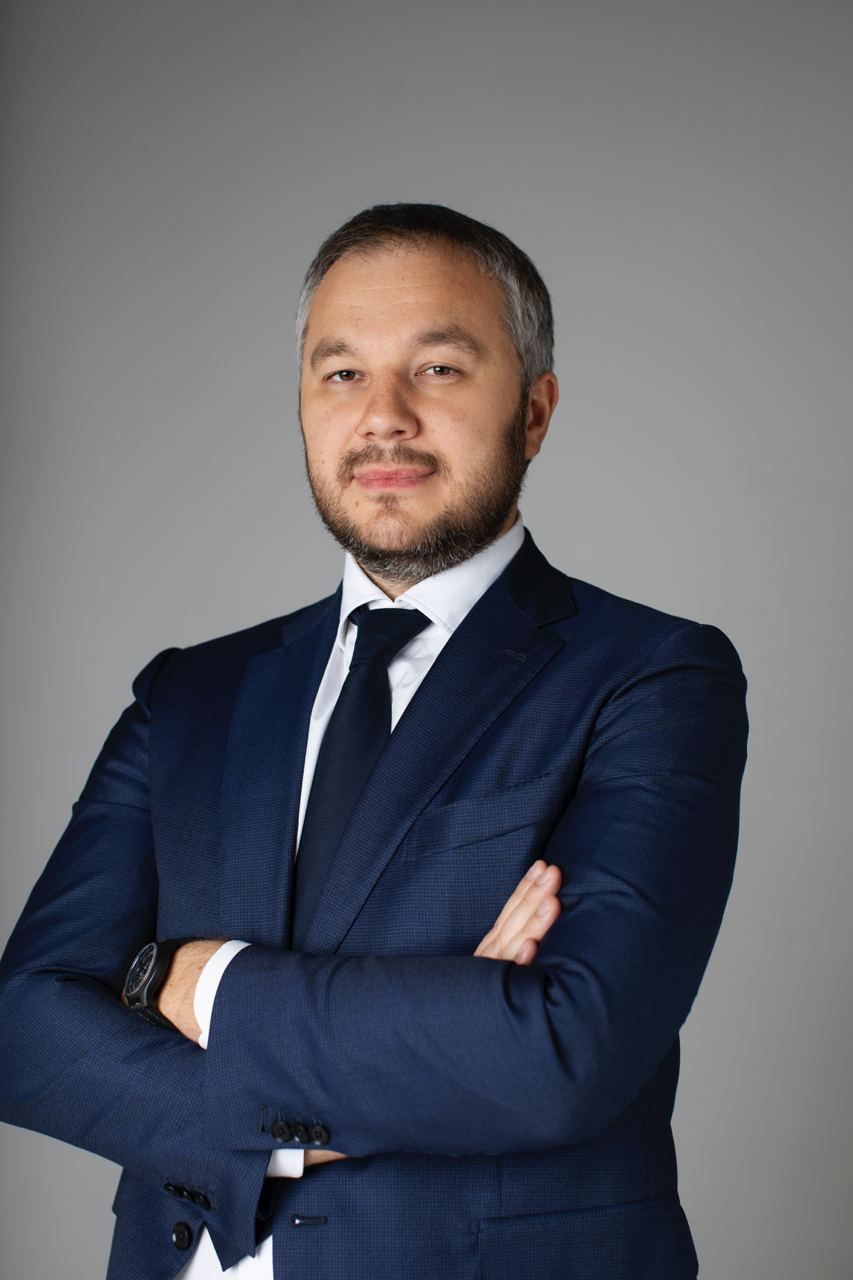

Deputy of the 8th State Duma
- Incumbent
- Assumed office 19 September 2021

Personal details
- Born: 9 April 1985 (age 41) Moscow, Russian Soviet Federative Socialist Republic, USSR
- Party: United Russia
- Education: Financial University under the Government of the Russian Federation

Ivan Solodovnikov (Russian: Иван Александрович Солодовников; born 9 April 1985, in Moscow) is a Russian political figure, deputy of the 8th State Duma.

From January 2013 to July 2014, Solodovnikov worked as Deputy General Director for Economics and Finance of Snabstroy LLC. From December 2019 to September 2021, he was the Director of the MoszhilNIIproekt. In 2021, Solodnikov also served as an adviser to the Governor of the Kursk Oblast Roman Starovoyt on a voluntary basis. Since September 2021, he has served as deputy of the 8th State Duma from the Kursk Oblast constituency.

In February 2022, Solodnikov was one of the 16 deputies who voted against the recognition of the Donetsk People's Republic and the Luhansk People's Republic.
