= Nikolay Petrunin =

Russian politician (1976–2022)

- Николай Петрунин
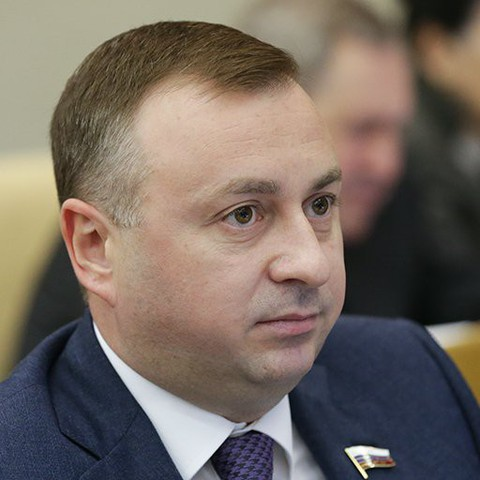
- Petrunin in 2016

Member of the State Duma
- In office 5 October 2016 – 12 October 2022

Personal details
- Born: 27 February 1976 Vyazniki, Vladimir Oblast, Russian SFSR, Soviet Union
- Died: 12 October 2022 (aged 46) Moscow, Russia
- Party: United Russia
- Education: Vladimir State University

Nikolay Petrunin (Russian: Николай Юрьевич Петрунин; 27 February 1976 – 12 October 2022) was a Russian politician and a deputy of the 7th and 8th State Dumas. In 2005, he was granted a Candidate of Sciences in Economics degree.

== Biography ==
After graduating from the Vladimir State University, Petrunin worked in commercial organizations. From 1993 to 2015, Petrunin was the director of the Steklo-Gaz corporate group. On September 18, 2016, he was elected deputy of the 7th State Duma. In September 2021, he was re-elected for the 8th State Duma from the Tula Oblast constituency.

Petrunin died in October 2022, reportedly from complications of COVID-19. Some regard his death as suspicious.

=== Sanctions ===
He was sanctioned by the UK government in 2022 in relation to the Russo-Ukrainian War.

He was one of the members of the State Duma sanctioned by the United States Treasury on 24 March 2022, in response to the 2022 Russian invasion of Ukraine.

== Awards ==
- Medal of the Order "For Merit to the Fatherland"

== See also ==
- List of members of the State Duma of Russia who died in office
