= Vasily Shvetsov (politician) =

Russian politician

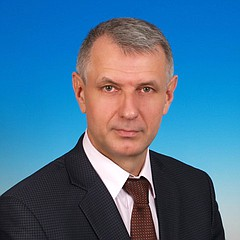

Member of the State Duma
- Incumbent
- Assumed office 11 June 2026
- In office 15 December 2011 – 5 October 2016

Personal details
- Born: 10 April 1961 (age 65) Chelyabinsk Oblast, Soviet Union
- Party: A Just Russia

Vasily Georgievich Shvetsov (born 10 April 1961) is a Russian politician who has been a member of the State Duma since 2026. He previously served from 2011 to 2016.

== See also ==
- 6th State Duma
- 8th State Duma
