= Olga Amelchenkova =

Russian politician

- Ольга Амельченкова
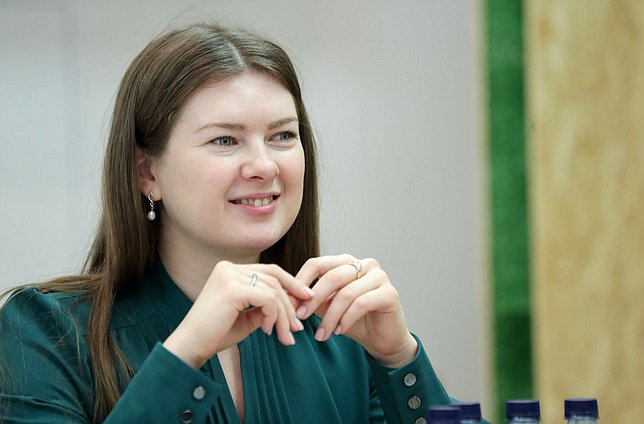

Deputy of the 8th State Duma
- Incumbent
- Assumed office 19 September 2021

Personal details
- Born: 5 September 1990 (age 35) Borisoglebsk, Voronezh Oblast, Russian Soviet Federative Socialist Republic, USSR
- Party: United Russia
- Education: Saint Petersburg State University of Engineering and Economics

Olga Nikolayevna Amelchenkova (Russian: Ольга Николаевна Амельченкова; born on 5 September 1990 in Borisoglebsk, Voronezh Oblast) is a Russian political figure, deputy of the 8th State Duma convocation. In 2015 she co-founded the All-Russian Volunteers of Victory movement. In January 2022, she suggested recognizing the Siege of Leningrad as an act of genocide.

In 2017 Amelchenkova became a member of the Civic Chamber of the Russian Federation. In 2018, Central Election Commission registered her as a trustee of the presidential candidate Vladimir Putin. In September 2021, she was elected to the State Duma of the 8th convocation, running from the United Russia. She represents the Leningrad Oblast and Pskov Oblast constituencies.

== Early life ==
Amelchenkova was born on 5 September 1990 in Borisoglebsk in the Russian SSR.

After graduating from the Saint Petersburg State University of Engineering and Economics in 2012, she was hired on a competitive basis to the administration of the Leningrad Oblast where she specialized on youth policies.

== Personal life ==
She married Tigran Zanko, the winner of the Leaders of Russia competition and the Director of the Research Center for Public Service and Management of the Russian Presidential Academy of National Economy and Public Administration. They married in Petrovsky Palace in Moscow.

== International sanctions ==
On 24 March 2022, the United States Treasury sanctioned her as a member of the State Duma in response to the 2022 Russian invasion of Ukraine. She was further sanctioned in December 2022 for supporting the annexation of Donetsk, Luhansk, Kherson, and Zaporozhye by the European Union. In March 2023, a Ukrainian court sentenced Zanko in absentia to 15 years in prison for confiscation of property and encroaching on the territorial integrity of Ukraine although members of the State Duma are said to have parliamentary immunity.

Criminal Prosecution

On March 22, 2023, a Ukrainian court sentenced Olga Zanko in absentia to 15 years in prison with confiscation of property under charges related to encroachment on the territorial integrity and inviolability of Ukraine.
