= Yevgeny Moskvichev =

Russian politician

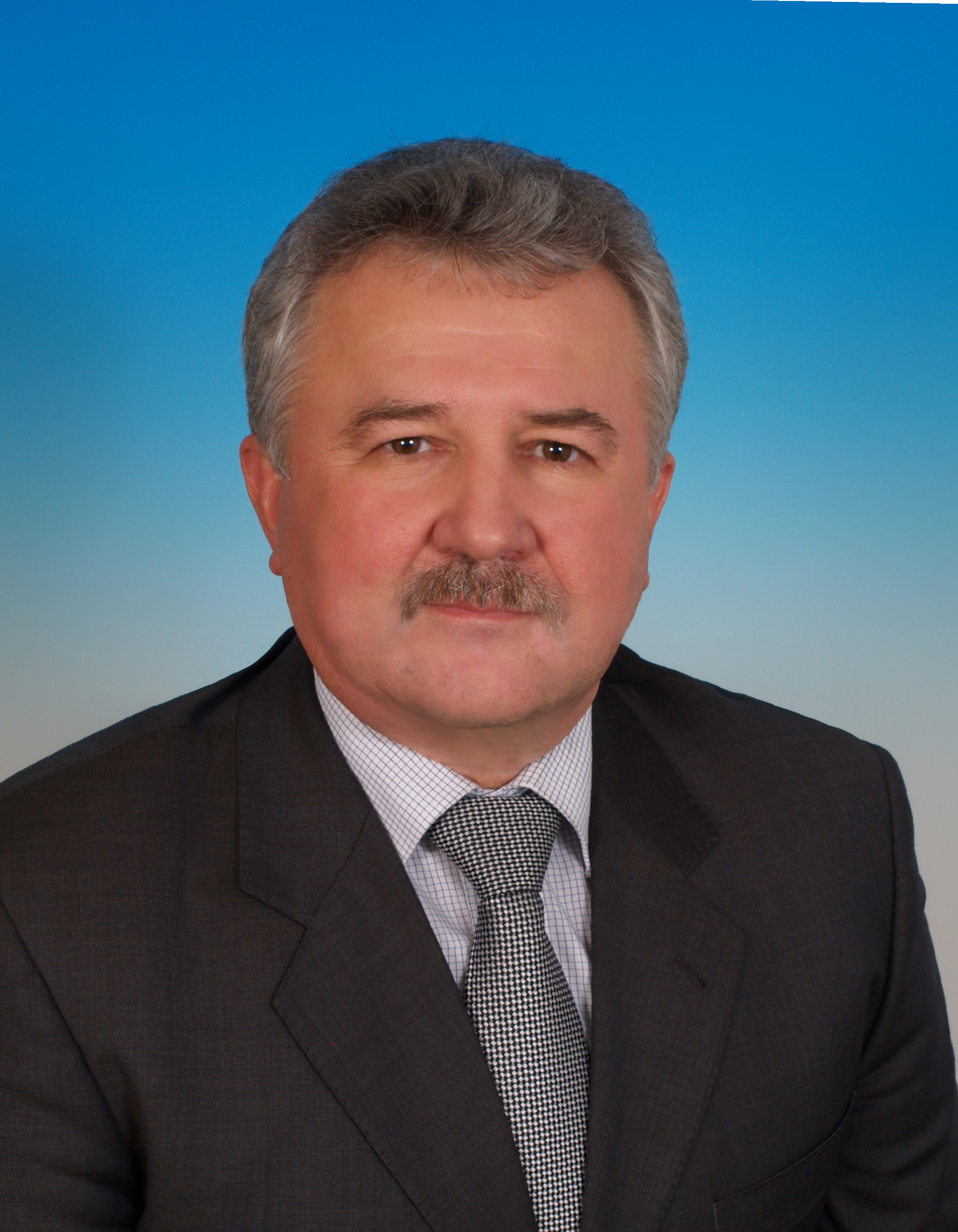

Chairman of the State Duma committee of the on transport and development of transport infrastructure
- Incumbent
- Assumed office 12 October 2021
- Preceded by: position was established

Deputy of the State Duma Russia
- Incumbent
- Assumed office 21 December 2011

Personal details
- Born: 28 September 1957 (age 68) Kazinki, Russia, Soviet Union
- Party: United Russia

Yevgeny Moskvichev is a Russian politician. Chairman of the State Duma Russia committee on transport and development of transport infrastructure from 12 October 2021.

Who is a member of the State Duma for the United Russia party in the 7th State Duma of the Russian Federation.

== Sanctions ==
He was sanctioned by the UK government in 2022 in relation to the Russo-Ukrainian War.
