= Yaroslav Samylin =

Russian politician (born 1997)

- Ярослав Самылин
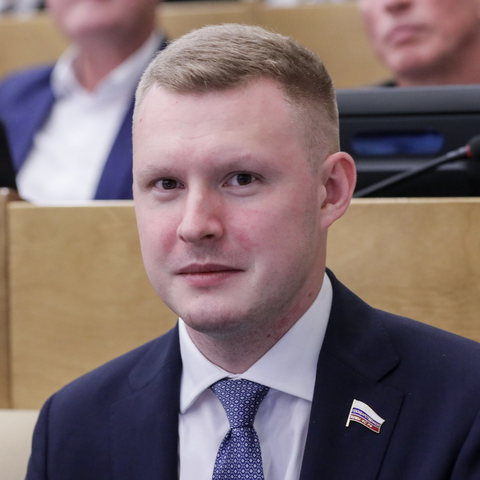

Member of the State Duma
- Incumbent
- Assumed office 14 August 2024
- Preceded by: Grigory Shilkin

Personal details
- Born: 25 March 1997 (age 29) Kramatorsk
- Party: New People
- Education: Plekhanov Russian University of Economics

Yaroslav Alekseevich Samylin (born 25 March 1997) is a Russian politician who has been a member of the State Duma since 2025.

== See also ==
- 8th State Duma
