= Sabayevo =

Sabayevo Сабаево
- Selo
- Location within Bashkortostan Location within Russia
- Coordinates: 54°52′N 54°27′E
- Country: Russia
- Region: Bashkortostan
- District: Buzdyaksky District
- Time zone: UTC+5:00

Sabayevo (Russian: Сабаево; Bashkir: Сабай, Sabay) is a rural locality (a selo) and the administrative centre of Sabayevsky Selsoviet, Buzdyaksky District, Bashkortostan, Russia. The population was 732 as of 2010. There are 10 streets.

== Geography ==
Sabayevo is located 38 km north of Buzdyak (the district's administrative centre) by road. Stary Shigay is the nearest rural locality.
