= Ruslan Lechkhadzhiev =

Russian politician

- Руслан Лечхаджиев

Deputy of the 8th State Duma
- Incumbent
- Assumed office 19 September 2021

Personal details
- Born: 2 July 1965 (age 61) Gudermes, Checheno-Ingush Autonomous Soviet Socialist Republic, USSR
- Party: United Russia
- Education: Grozny State Oil Technical University

Ruslan Lechkhadzhiev (Russian: Руслан Абдулвахиевич Лечхаджиев; born 2 July 1965, Gudermes) is a Russian political figure and a deputy of the 8th State Duma.

From 2004 to 2007, Lechkhadzhiev headed the branch of the Directorate of the North Caucasian Highways of the Federal Road Agency. In 2007–2021, he worked at the Department of Federal Highways "Caucasus" of the Federal Road Agency, first as the deputy chief and then as the chief. Since September 2021, he has served as deputy of the 8th State Duma.

On 24 March 2022, the United States Treasury sanctioned him in response to the 2022 Russian invasion of Ukraine. The United Kingdom also sanctioned Lechkhadzhiev in 2022.
