= 5th State Duma =

Convocation of the lower house of Russian parliament

State Duma of the Federal Assembly of the Russian Federation of the 5th convocation
←	4th State Duma	6th State Duma	→

Overview
- Meeting place: State Duma building Moscow, Okhotny Ryad street, 1
- Term: 24 December 2007 – 21 December 2011
- Election: 2 December 2007
- Government: Zubkov Government; Putin Second Government
- Website: State Duma
- Members: 450 / 450
- Chairman: Boris Gryzlov (from United Russia)
- First Deputy: Oleg Morozov (from United Russia)
- Deputy: List: Lyubov Sliska (from United Russia) Svetlana Zhurova (from United Russia) Vyacheslav Volodin (from United Russia) Yuri Volkov (from United Russia) Valery Yazev (from United Russia) Nadezhda Gerasimova (from United Russia) Ivan Melnikov (from Communist Party) Alexander Babakov (from A Just Russia) Vladimir Zhirinovsky (from Liberal Democratic Party)
- Party control: United Russia

The State Duma of the Federal Assembly of the Russian Federation of the 5th convocation (Russian: Государственная Дума Федерального Собрания Российской Федерации V созыва) is a former convocation of the legislative branch of the State Duma, lower house of the Russian Parliament. The 5th convocation met at the State Duma building in Moscow, worked from December 24, 2007, to December 21, 2011.

The 5th State Duma's composition was based upon the results of the 2007 parliamentary election. Of the eleven parties participating in the elections, only four were able to overcome the 7% election threshold to gain representation based upon the proportional representation system.

== Leadership ==
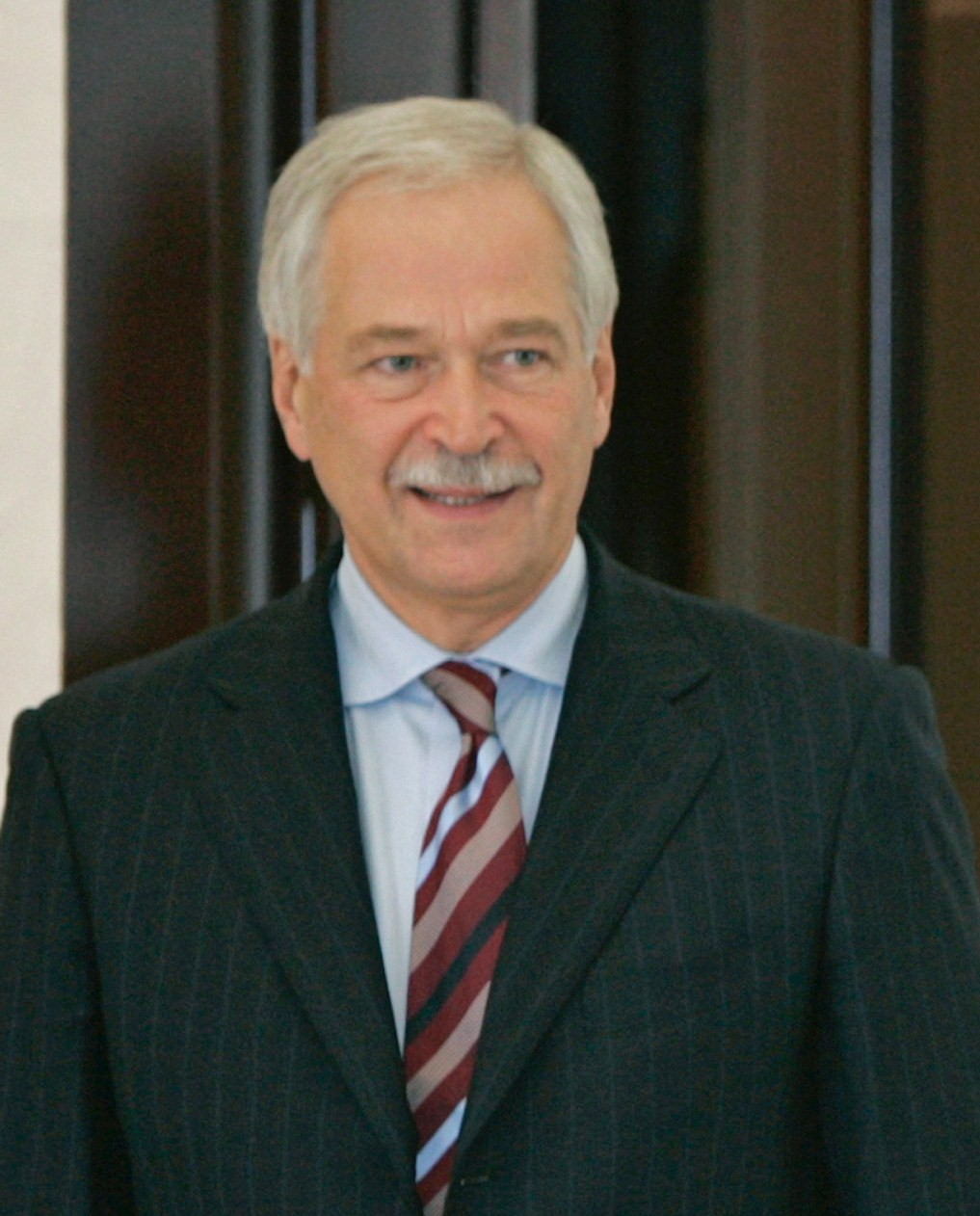
Boris Gryzlov is the Chairman of the 5th State Duma

On December 24, 2007, the parliament re-elected Boris Gryzlov from the United Russia as the Chairman of the State Duma.

At the same time, according to tradition, until the election of the Chairman of the State Duma, the meeting carried the oldest members of the State Duma – 77 year-old of Zhores Alferov (from Communist Party).

Office	MP	Period	Parliamentary affiliation
Chairman	Boris Gryzlov	December 24, 2007 – December 21, 2011	United Russia
First Deputy Chairman	Oleg Morozov	December 24, 2007 – December 21, 2011	United Russia
Deputy Chairman	Lyubov Sliska	December 24, 2007 – December 21, 2011	United Russia
Deputy Chairman	Svetlana Zhurova	December 24, 2007 – December 21, 2011	United Russia
Deputy Chairman	Vyacheslav Volodin	December 24, 2007 – December 21, 2011	United Russia
Deputy Chairman	Yuri Volkov	December 24, 2007 – December 21, 2011	United Russia
Deputy Chairman	Valery Yazev	December 24, 2007 – December 21, 2011	United Russia
Deputy Chairman	Nadezhda Gerasimova	December 24, 2007 – December 21, 2011	United Russia
Deputy Chairman	Ivan Melnikov	December 24, 2007 – December 21, 2011	Communist Party
Deputy Chairman	Alexander Babakov	December 24, 2007 – December 21, 2011	A Just Russia
Deputy Chairman	Vladimir Zhirinovsky	December 24, 2007 – December 21, 2011	Liberal Democratic Party
Faction leaders	Boris Gryzlov	December 24, 2007 – December 21, 2011	United Russia
Faction leaders	Gennady Zuganov	December 24, 2007 – December 21, 2011	Communist Party
Faction leaders	Igor Lebedev	December 24, 2007 – December 21, 2011	Liberal Democratic Party
Faction leaders	Sergey Mironov	December 24, 2007 – December 21, 2011	A Just Russia

== Factions ==
Location of parliamentary factions in the 5th State Duma: United Russia (315) Communist Party (57) / Liberal Democratic Party (40) A Just Russia (38)

Faction	Seats
United Russia	315
Communist Party of the Russian Federation	57
Liberal Democratic Party of Russia	40
A Just Russia	38

== List of deputies ==
List of deputies

Communist Party

- Zhores Alferov
- Andrey Anatoliyevich Andreyev
- Alevtina Aparina
- Yury Afonin
- Alexey Bagaryakov
- Sergei Gavrilov
- Ruslan Gostev
- Oleg Denisenko
- Nikolay Ezersky
- Gennady Zyuganov
- Viktor Ilyukhin
- Leonid Kalashnikov
- Boris Kashin
- Vladimir Kashin
- Viktor Kolomeitsev
- Nikolay Kolomeitsev
- Vladimir Komoyedov
- Alexey Kornienko
- Alexander Kulikov
- Oleg Kulikov
- Valentin Kuptsov
- Sergey Levchenko
- Anatoly Lokot
- Yuri Maslyukov
- Ivan Melnikov
- Sergey Muravlenko
- Vladimir Nikitin
- Dmitry Novikov
- Sergei Obukhov
- Nina Ostanina
- Victor Pautov
- Tamara Pletnyova
- Alexey Ponomaryov
- Nikolay Razvorotnev
- Valery Rashkin
- Sergey Reshulsky
- Valentin Romanov
- Peter Romanov
- Aleksey Russkikh
- Nikolay Ryabov
- Svetlana Savitskaya
- Peter Svechnikov
- Oleg Smolin
- Sergei Sobko
- Svyatoslav Sokol
- Vadim Solovyov
- Vasily Starodubtsev
- Vladimir Ulas
- Vladimir Fedotkin
- Nikolay Kharitonov
- Vladimir Khakhichev
- Valentin Chikin
- Konstantin Shirshov
- Sergey Shtogrin
- Valentin Shurchanov
- Igor Edel
- Vladislav Yurchik

Liberal Democratic Party

- Sergey Abeltsev
- Yelena Afanasyeva (politician)
- Konstantin Vetrov
- Воложинская Татьяна
- Denis Volchek
- Dzhamaladin Gasanov
- Irina Gorkova
- Denis Davitiashvili
- Tatiana Dubrovskaya
- Ashot Egiazaryan
- Vladimir Zhirinovsky
- Vasiliy Zhurko
- Alexey Zavarnitsin
- Sergey Ivanov
- Yuri Kogan
- Oleg Kolesnikov
- Andrei Lebedev
- Igor Lebedev
- Andrey Lugovoy
- Eduard Markin
- Mikhail Musatov
- Yury Napso
- Alexey Ostrovsky
- Mikhail Pitkevich
- Igor Rozhkov
- Maksim Rokhmistrov
- Arkady Sarkisyan
- Arkady Svistunov
- Dmitry Svishchev
- Valery Seleznev
- Vladimir Semyonov
- Leonid Slutsky
- Pavel Tarakanov
- Vasily Tarasyuk
- Vladimir Taskaev
- Evgeny Teplyakov
- Sergei Furgal
- Mikhail Hesin
- Kirill Cherkasov
- Rifat Shaykhutdinov

A Just Russia — For Truth

- Anatoly Aksakov
- Alexander Babakov
- Semyon Bagdasarov
- Anton Belyakov
- Konstantin Beschetnov
- Alexander Burkov
- Elena Vtorygina
- Valery Gartung
- Elmira Glubokovskaya
- Svetlana Goryacheva
- Ivan Grachev
- Anatoly Greshnevikov
- Gennady Gudkov
- Oksana Dmitriyeva
- Yelena Drapeko
- Mikhail Emelianov
- Valery Zubov
- Igor Kasyanov
- Alla Kuzmina
- Nikolai Levichev
- Vera Lekareva
- Alexander Lomakin-Rumyantsev
- Kira Lukyanova
- Yelena Mizulina
- Oleg Mikheev
- Tatyana Moskalkova
- Adnan Muzykayev
- Sergey Petrov
- Ilya Ponomarev
- Mikhail Starshinov
- Alexander Terentyev
- Fedot Tumusov
- Galina Khovanskaya
- Valery Chereshnev
- Alexander Chetverikov
- Oleg Shein
- Vasily Shestakov
- Viktor Shudegov

United Russia

- Viktor Abramov
- Adam Amirilayev
- Grigory Anikeyev
- Viktor Antonov (politician)
- Roman Antonov
- Otari Arshba
- Vladimir Aseev
- Spartak Akhmetov
- Mikhail Babich
- Grigory Balykhin
- Mikhail Banshchikov
- Igor Barinov
- Arkady Baskayev
- Alexander Bednov
- Sergey Belokonev
- Alexander Berestov
- Ildar Berkheev
- Valentin Bobyrev
- Valery Bogomolov
- Evgeny Bogomolny
- Irek Boguslavsky
- Olga Borzova
- Yuri Borisovets
- Nikolay Bortsov
- Andrey Bocharov
- Nikolai Budarin
- Alexander Burnosov
- Natalia Burykina
- Oleg Valenchuk
- Vadim Varshavsky
- Vladimir Vasilyev
- Yuri Vasiliev
- Khozh-Magomed Vakhaev
- Viktor Vodolatsky
- Victor Voitenko
- Alexei Volkov
- Yury Volkov
- Vyacheslav Volodin
- Andrey Vorobyov
- Tatiana Voronova
- Valery Vostrotin
- Dmitry Vyatkin
- Ildar Gabdrakhmanov
- Magomed Gadzhiyev
- Farida Gainullina
- Olga Galtsova
- Valery Galchenko
- Magomedkadi Hasanov
- Nikolai Gerasimenko
- Nadezhda Gerasimova
- Ildar Gilmutdinov
- Ildar Gimaletdinov
- Rafael Gimalov
- Valeri Gladilin
- Stanislav Govorukhin
- Georgy Golikov
- Vladimir Golovnev
- Andrey Golushko
- Rostislav Goldstein
- Nikolay Gonchar
- Vladimir Gorbachev
- Oleg Grebenkin
- Vladimir Gridin
- Mikhail Grishankov
- Vladimir Gruzdev
- Boris Gryzlov
- Rinat Gubaidullin
- Anatoly Gubkin
- Peter Guzhvin
- Alexander Gurov (politician)
- Victor Dedov
- Adam Delimkhanov
- Ivan Demchenko
- Valentin Denisov
- Valery Draganov
- Valentin Drusinov
- Vyacheslav Dubrovin
- Gennady Dyudyaev
- Sergey Egorov
- Alexey Yezubov
- Natalia Ermakova
- Sergei Zheleznyak
- Oleg Zholobov
- Svetlana Zhurova
- Viktor Zavarzin
- Akhmar Zavgayev
- Marat Zagidullov
- Konstantin Zaitsev
- Mikhail Zalikhanov
- Konstantin Zatulin
- Svetlana Zakharova (dancer)
- Vasily Zakharyashchev
- Viktor Zvagelsky
- Yuri Zelensky
- Viktor Zimin (politician)
- Vasily Zinoviev
- Viktor Zubarev
- Boris Zubitsky
- Pavel Zyryanov
- Anatoly Ivanov
- Mikhail Ivanov (cross-country skier)
- Grigory Ivliev
- Marina Ignatova
- Igor Igoshin
- Galina Izotova
- Andrey Isayev
- Rizvangadzhi Isaev
- Ernst Isayev
- Yury Isaev
- Igor Isakov
- Ramil Iskuzhin
- Salavat Itkulov
- Svetlana Ishmouratova
- Alexander Ishchenko
- Alina Kabaeva
- Valentina Kabanova
- Viktor Kazakov
- Hamit Kamalov
- Sergey Kapkov
- Yury Karabasov
- Aleksandr Karelin
- Galina Karelova
- Raisa Karmazina
- Natalia Karpovich
- Yuri Kaufman
- Ivan Kvitka
- Murat Keekbayev
- Vladimir Klimenko
- Andrey Klimov
- Frants Klintsevich
- Alexander Klyukin
- Andrey Knorr
- Joseph Kobzon
- Nikolay Kovalyov
- Alexander Koval
- Aleksandr Kogan (politician)
- Anatoly Kozeradsky
- Alexander Kozlovsky (politician born 1944)
- Andrey Kokoshin
- Vladimir Kolesnikov
- Sergey Kolesnikov
- Foat Komarov
- Natalya Komarova
- Valery Komissarov
- Yelena Kondakova
- Ruslan Kondratov
- Vasily Kopylov
- Oleg Korgunov
- Anatoly Korendyasev
- Alexander Korzhakov
- Valery Kornilov
- Maxim Korobov
- Konstantin Kosachev
- Valeriy Kravchenko
- Pavel Krasheninnikov
- Vasily Kuznetsov
- Ekaterina Kuzmicheva
- Gennady Kulik
- Engels Kulmukhametov
- Vyacheslav Kushchev
- Georgy Lazarev
- Ekaterina Lakhova
- Oleg Lebedev
- Georgy Leontiev
- Yuri Lipatov
- Anatoly Lisitsyn
- Ivan Lobanov
- Andrey Makarov
- Nadezhda Maximova
- Victor Malashenko
- Valery Maleev
- Valery Malchikhin
- Musa Manarov
- Vladimir Markov
- Sergei Markov
- Vladimir Matkhanov
- Evgeny Medvedev
- Pavel Medvedev
- Yuri Medvedev
- Vladimir Medinsky
- Maksim Mishchenko
- Andrey Morozov
- Oleg Morozov
- Alexander Moskalets
- Marina Mukabenova
- Saliya Murzabaeva
- Nikolay Musalimov
- Ilyaz Muslimov
- Zelimkhan Mutsoev
- Andrey Nazarov
- Sergey Neverov
- Mikhail Nenashev
- Viktor Nefyodov
- Boris Nikonov
- Klavdia Novikova
- Olga Noskova
- Asanbuba Nyudyurbegov
- Sergey Ovsyannikov
- Sergey Ozerov
- Nikolay Olshansky
- Olga Onishchenko
- Sergey Osadchy
- Vyacheslav Osipov
- Anatoly Ostryagin
- Elena Panina
- Nikolay Pankov
- Valery Panov
- Vladimir Pekarev
- Sergey Pekpeev
- Liana Pepelyaeva
- Julia Peskovskaya
- Sergey Petrov
- Vladimir Pekhtin
- Valentina Pivnenko
- Alexey Plakhotnikov
- Victor Pleskachevsky
- Vladimir Pligin
- Alexander Popov
- Sergey Aleksandrovich Popov
- Valery Prozorovsky
- Natalia Pugacheva
- Igor Puzanov
- Boris Reznik
- Vladislav Reznik
- Irina Rodnina
- Alexey Rozuvan
- Igor Rudensky
- Nikolai Ryzhak
- Konstantin Rykov
- Valery Ryazansky
- Alexey Sabadash
- Dmitry Sablin
- Ivan Savvidis
- Dmitry Savelyev
- Yury Savenko
- Oleg Savchenko
- Rinat Sagitov
- Khafiz Salikhov
- Evgeny Samoilov
- Alexander Sarychev
- Gadzhimet Safaraliyev
- Yuri Sverdlov
- Viktor Semenov
- Pavel Semyonov
- Ekaterina Semyonova
- Gulnara Sergeyeva
- Lev Serebrov
- Fatikh Sibagatullin
- Leonid Simanovsky
- Anton Sikharulidze
- Aleksandr Skorobogatko
- Andrei Skoch
- Lyubov Sliska
- Sergey Smetanyuk
- Vladimir Stalmakhov
- Anatoly Starodubets
- Zoya Stepanova
- Mikhail Sutyaginsky
- Alexander Sysoev
- Viktor Taranin
- Mikhail Tarasenko
- Mikhail Terentyev
- Vyacheslav Timchenko
- Alexey Tkachov
- Vasily Tolstopiatov
- Vladislav Tretiak
- Evgeny Tugolukov
- Alexander Tyagunov
- Viktor Usachev
- Vasily Usoltsev
- Arsen Fadzaev
- Irshat Fakhritdinov
- Yevgeny Fyodorov
- Alexander Fokin
- Arkady Fomin
- Alexander Furman
- Ruslan Khadzhebiekov
- Airat Khairullin
- Belan Khamchiev
- Alexander Khinshtein
- Gleb Khor
- Svetlana Khorkina
- Lyubov Tsvetova
- Valentin Chaika
- Victoria Cherkesova
- Igor Chernyshenko
- Valentin Cherniavsky
- Sergey Chizhov
- Artur Chilingarov
- Andrey Chirkin
- Alexander Chukhraev
- Martin Shakkum
- Fedor Shvalev
- Georgiy Shevtsov
- Alexander Shimanov
- Konstantin Shipunov
- Khizri Shikhsaidov
- Sergey Shishkarev
- Alexander Shishkin (politician)
- Robert Schlegel
- Larisa Shoigu
- Stepan Shorshorov
- Vitaly Shuba
- Lubov Shubina
- Adalbi Shkhagoshev
- Michael Everstov
- Akhmat Erkenov
- Vitaliy Aleksandrovich Yuzhilin
- Marsel Yusupov
- Valery Yazev
- Viktor Yakimov
- Larisa Yakovleva
- Tatiana Yakovleva
- Eduard Yanakov
- Irina Yarovaya
- Said Yakhikhazhiyev

== Major legislation ==
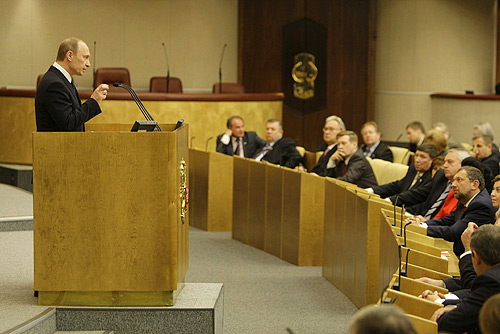
Vladimir Putin during his appointment as Prime Minister.

- May 8, 2008: Vladimir Putin approved as Prime Minister of Russia with 392 votes in favor.
- November 21, 2008: Approved amendments to the Constitution of Russia with 392 votes in favor.

== Committees ==
In the State Duma of the 5th convocation operated 33 Committees.

- Committee on Constitutional Legislation and State Building
- Committee on Civil, Criminal, Arbitration and Procedural Law
- Veterans Affairs Committee
- Committee of Labour and Social Policy
- Budget and Tax Committee
- Financial Market Committee
- Committee on Economic Policy and Entrepreneurship
- Committee on Property Issues
- Committee on Information Policy, Information Technology and Communications
- Committee on Energy
- Committee on Transport
- Land Relations Committee and construction
- Industry Committee
- Committee on Science and High Technology
- Education Committee
- Committee on Culture
- Physical Culture and Sports Committee
- Youth Committee
- Health Protection Committee
- Committee on Women, Family and Children
- Committee on Agrarian Issues
- Defence Committee
- Safety Committee
- Committee on International Affairs
- Committee on Commonwealth of Independent States Affairs and Relations with Compatriots
- Committee on Rules and Organization of the State Duma
- Committee on the problems of the North and Far East
- Committee on Federation Affairs and Regional Policy
- Committee on Local Government
- The Environmental Committee
- Committee on Natural Resources and the Environment
- Committee on Public Associations and Religious Organizations
- Committee for Nationalities
