= List of members of the 7th Russian State Duma =

Members of the 7th Russian State Duma
←	6th	8th	→

Overview
- Term: 5 October 2016 – 12 October 2021
- Election: 18 September 2016
- Website: Members of the 7th State Duma
- Party control: United Russia

Election to the 7th Russian State Duma were held on 18 September 2016. 450 members were elected, 225 of them by party lists and 225 in Single-member constituencies.

== List ==
Members of the State Duma
Federal Subject	Constituency	Name	Party	Faction	Period
Adygea	Adygea	Vladislav Reznik	Independent	United Russia	5 October 2016 – 12 October 2021
Altai Republic	Altai	Rodion Bukachakov	United Russia	United Russia	5 October 2016 – 12 October 2021
Bashkortostan	Ufa	Pavel Kachkayev	United Russia	United Russia	5 October 2016 – 12 October 2021
Bashkortostan	Blagoveshchensk	Ildar Bikbayev	United Russia	United Russia	5 October 2016 – 12 October 2021
Bashkortostan	Beloretsk	Zugura Rakhmatullina	United Russia	United Russia	5 October 2016 – 12 October 2021
Bashkortostan	Neftekamsk	Rifat Shaykhutdinov	Civic Platform	Unaffiliated	5 October 2016 – 12 October 2021
Bashkortostan	Salavat	Zarif Baiguskarov	United Russia	United Russia	5 October 2016 – 12 October 2021
Bashkortostan	Sterlitamak	Alexey Izotov	United Russia	United Russia	5 October 2016 – 12 October 2021
Buryatia	Buryatia	Aldar Damdinov	United Russia	United Russia	5 October 2016 – 12 October 2021
Dagestan	Northern	Umakhan Umakhanov	United Russia	United Russia	5 October 2016 – 12 October 2021
Dagestan	Central	Abdulgamid Emirgamzayev	United Russia	United Russia	5 October 2016 – 12 October 2021
Dagestan	Southern	Abdulmajid Magramov	United Russia	United Russia	5 October 2016 – 12 October 2021
Ingushetia	Ingushetia	Alikhan Kharsiyev	United Russia	United Russia	5 October 2016 – 12 October 2021
Kabardino-Balkaria	Kabardino-Balkaria	Adalbi Shkhagoshev	United Russia	United Russia	5 October 2016 – 12 October 2021
Kalmykia	Kalmykia	Marina Mukabenova	United Russia	United Russia	5 October 2016 – 12 October 2021
Karachay-Cherkessia	Karachay-Cherkessia	Rasul Botashev	United Russia	United Russia	5 October 2016 – 12 October 2021
Karelia	Karelia	Valentina Pivnenko	United Russia	United Russia	5 October 2016 – 12 October 2021
(Komi Republic) Komi	Syktyvkar	Ivan Medvedev	United Russia	United Russia	5 October 2016 – 12 October 2021
(Republic of Crimea (Russia)) Crimea	Simferopol	Andrey Kozenko	United Russia	United Russia	5 October 2016 – 12 October 2021
(Republic of Crimea (Russia)) Crimea	Kerch	Konstantin Bakharev	United Russia	United Russia	5 October 2016 – 12 October 2021
(Republic of Crimea (Russia)) Crimea	Yevpatoria	Svetlana Savchenko	United Russia	United Russia	5 October 2016 – 12 October 2021
Mari El	Mari El	Sergey Kazankov	Communist Party	Communist Party	5 October 2016 – 12 October 2021
Mordovia	Mordovia	Vitaly Efimov	United Russia	United Russia	5 October 2016 – 12 October 2021
(Sakha Republic) Sakha (Yakutia)	Yakutia	Fedot Tumusov	A Just Russia	A Just Russia	5 October 2016 – 12 October 2021
(North Ossetia–Alania) North Ossetia-Alania	North Ossetia	Artur Taymazov	United Russia	United Russia	5 October 2016 – 12 October 2021
Tatarstan	Privolzhsky	Fatikh Sibagatullin	United Russia	United Russia	5 October 2016 – 12 October 2021
Tatarstan	Moskovsky	Ildar Gilmutdinov	United Russia	United Russia	5 October 2016 – 12 October 2021
Tatarstan	Nizhnekamsk	Airat Khairullin	United Russia	United Russia	5 October 2016 – 7 February 2020
Tatarstan	Nizhnekamsk	Oleg Morozov	United Russia	United Russia	23 September 2020 – 12 October 2021
Tatarstan	Naberezhnye Chelny	Alfiya Kogogina	United Russia	United Russia	5 October 2016 – 12 October 2021
Tatarstan	Almetyevsk	Rinat Khayrov	United Russia	United Russia	5 October 2016 – 12 October 2021
Tatarstan	Central	Irshat Minkin	United Russia	United Russia	5 October 2016 – 12 October 2021
Tuva	Tuva	Mergen Oorzhak	United Russia	United Russia	5 October 2016 – 12 October 2021
Udmurtia	Udmurtia	Alexey Zagrebin	United Russia	United Russia	5 October 2016 – 12 October 2021
Udmurtia	Izhevsk	Valery Buzilov	United Russia	United Russia	5 October 2016 – 12 October 2021
Khakassia	Khakassia	Nadezhda Maximova	United Russia	United Russia	5 October 2016 – 12 October 2021
Chechnya	Chechnya	Adam Delimkhanov	United Russia	United Russia	5 October 2016 – 12 October 2021
Chuvashia	Kanash	Anatoly Aksakov	A Just Russia	A Just Russia	5 October 2016 – 12 October 2021
Chuvashia	Cheboksary	Leonid Cherkesov	United Russia	United Russia	5 October 2016 – 12 October 2021
Altai Krai	Barnaul	Daniil Bessarabov	United Russia	United Russia	5 October 2016 – 12 October 2021
Altai Krai	Rubtsovsk	Viktor Zobnev	United Russia	United Russia	5 October 2016 – 12 October 2021
Altai Krai	Biysk	Alexander Prokopyev	United Russia	United Russia	5 October 2016 – 12 October 2021
Altai Krai	Slavgorod	Ivan Loor	United Russia	United Russia	5 October 2016 – 12 October 2021
Zabaykalsky Krai	Chita	Nikolay Govorin	United Russia	United Russia	5 October 2016 – 12 October 2021
Zabaykalsky Krai	Dauria	Vasilina Kuliyeva	Liberal Democratic Party	Liberal Democratic Party	5 October 2016 – 12 October 2021
Kamchatka Krai	Kamchatka	Konstantin Slyshchenko	United Russia	United Russia	5 October 2016 – 12 October 2021
Krasnodar Krai	Krasnodar	Vladimir Yevlanov	United Russia	United Russia	5 October 2016 – 12 October 2021
Krasnodar Krai	Krasnoarmeysk	Dmitry Lameykin	United Russia	United Russia	5 October 2016 – 12 October 2021
Krasnodar Krai	Slavyansk	Ivan Demchenko	United Russia	United Russia	5 October 2016 – 12 October 2021
Krasnodar Krai	Tuapse	Vladimir Sinyagovsky	United Russia	United Russia	5 October 2016 – 12 October 2021
Krasnodar Krai	Sochi	Konstantin Zatulin	United Russia	United Russia	5 October 2016 – 12 October 2021
Krasnodar Krai	Tikhoretsk	Alexey Ezubov	United Russia	United Russia	5 October 2016 – 12 October 2021
Krasnodar Krai	Armavir	Nikolay Kharitonov	Communist Party	Communist Party	5 October 2016 – 12 October 2021
Krasnodar Krai	Kanevskaya	Natalya Boyeva	United Russia	United Russia	5 October 2016 – 12 October 2021
Krasnoyarsk Krai	Krasnoyarsk	Yury Shvytkin	United Russia	United Russia	5 October 2016 – 12 October 2021
Krasnoyarsk Krai	Central	Pyotr Pimashkov	United Russia	United Russia	5 October 2016 – 12 August 2021
Krasnoyarsk Krai	Central	Vacant			12 August 2021 – 12 October 2021
Krasnoyarsk Krai	Divnogorsk	Viktor Zubarev	United Russia	United Russia	5 October 2016 – 12 October 2021
Krasnoyarsk Krai	Yeniseysk	Raisa Karmazina	United Russia	United Russia	5 October 2016 – 12 October 2021
Perm Krai	Perm	Igor Shubin	United Russia	United Russia	5 October 2016 – 12 October 2021
Perm Krai	Chusovoy	Alexey Burnashov	United Russia	United Russia	5 October 2016 – 12 October 2021
Perm Krai	Kungur	Dmitry Skrivanov	United Russia	United Russia	5 October 2016 – 12 October 2021
Perm Krai	Kudymkar	Dmitry Sazonov	United Russia	United Russia	5 October 2016 – 12 October 2021
Primorsky Krai	Vladivostok	Sergey Sopchuk	United Russia	United Russia	5 October 2016 – 12 October 2021
Primorsky Krai	Artyom	Vladimir Novikov	United Russia	United Russia	5 October 2016 – 12 October 2021
Primorsky Krai	Arsenyev	Victoria Nikolaeva	United Russia	United Russia	5 October 2016 – 12 October 2021
Stavropol Krai	Stavropol	Mikhail Kuzmin	United Russia	United Russia	5 October 2016 – 12 October 2021
Stavropol Krai	Nevinnomyssk	Alexander Ishchenko	United Russia	United Russia	5 October 2016 – 12 October 2021
Stavropol Krai	Mineralnye Vody	Olga Kazakova	United Russia	United Russia	5 October 2016 – 12 October 2021
Stavropol Krai	Georgiyevsk	Yelena Bondarenko	United Russia	United Russia	5 October 2016 – 12 October 2021
Khabarovsk Krai	Khabarovsk	Boris Gladkikh	United Russia	United Russia	5 October 2016 – 12 October 2021
Khabarovsk Krai	Komsomolsk-na-Amure	Sergey Furgal	Liberal Democratic Party	Liberal Democratic Party	5 October 2016 – 27 September 2018
Khabarovsk Krai	Komsomolsk-na-Amure	Ivan Pilyaev	Liberal Democratic Party	Liberal Democratic Party	8 September 2019 – 12 October 2021
Amur Oblast	Amur	Ivan Abramov	Liberal Democratic Party	Liberal Democratic Party	5 October 2016 – 13 June 2018
Amur Oblast	Amur	Andrey Kuzmin	Liberal Democratic Party	Liberal Democratic Party	9 September 2018 – 12 October 2021
Arkhangelsk Oblast	Arkhangelsk	Dmitry Yurkov	United Russia	United Russia	5 October 2016 – 12 October 2021
Arkhangelsk Oblast	Kotlas	Andrey Palkin	United Russia	United Russia	5 October 2016 – 12 October 2021
Astrakhan Oblast	Astrakhan	Leonid Ogul	United Russia	United Russia	5 October 2016 – 12 October 2021
Belgorod Oblast	Belgorod	Sergey Bozhenov	United Russia	United Russia	5 October 2016 – 12 October 2021
Belgorod Oblast	Stary Oskol	Andrei Skoch	United Russia	United Russia	5 October 2016 – 12 October 2021
Bryansk Oblast	Bryansk	Vladimir Zhutenkov	United Russia	United Russia	5 October 2016 – 10 June 2017
Bryansk Oblast	Bryansk	Boris Paikin	Liberal Democratic Party	Liberal Democratic Party	10 September 2017 – 12 October 2021
Bryansk Oblast	Unecha	Valentina Mironova	United Russia	United Russia	5 October 2016 – 12 October 2021
Vladimir Oblast	Vladimir	Igor Igoshin	United Russia	United Russia	5 October 2016 – 12 October 2021
Vladimir Oblast	Suzdal	Grigory Anikeyev	United Russia	United Russia	5 October 2016 – 12 October 2021
Volgograd Oblast	Volgograd	Anna Kuvychko	United Russia	United Russia	5 October 2016 – 12 October 2021
Volgograd Oblast	Krasnoarmeysky	Tatyana Tsybizova	United Russia	United Russia	5 October 2016 – 12 October 2021
Volgograd Oblast	Mikhaylovka	Vladimir Plotnikov	United Russia	United Russia	5 October 2016 – 12 October 2021
Volgograd Oblast	Volzhsky	Irina Guseva	United Russia	United Russia	5 October 2016 – 12 October 2021
Vologda Oblast	Vologda	Yevgeny Shulepov	United Russia	United Russia	5 October 2016 – 12 October 2021
Vologda Oblast	Cherepovets	Alexey Kanaev	United Russia	United Russia	5 October 2016 – 12 October 2021
Voronezh Oblast	Voronezh	Arkady Ponomaryov	United Russia	United Russia	5 October 2016 – 12 October 2021
Voronezh Oblast	Pravoberezhny	Sergey Chizhov	United Russia	United Russia	5 October 2016 – 12 October 2021
Voronezh Oblast	Anna	Aleksey Zhuravlyov	Rodina	Unaffiliated	5 October 2016 – 12 October 2021
Voronezh Oblast	Pavlovsk	Andrey Markov	United Russia	United Russia	5 October 2016 – 12 October 2021
Ivanovo Oblast	Ivanovo	Alexey Khokhlov	United Russia	United Russia	5 October 2016 – 12 October 2021
Ivanovo Oblast	Kineshma	Yury Smirnov	United Russia	United Russia	5 October 2016 – 12 October 2021
Irkutsk Oblast	Irkutsk	Mikhail Shchapov	Communist Party	Communist Party	5 October 2016 – 12 October 2021
Irkutsk Oblast	Angarsk	Alexey Krasnoshtanov	United Russia	United Russia	5 October 2016 – 12 October 2021
Irkutsk Oblast	Shelekhov	Sergey Ten	United Russia	United Russia	5 October 2016 – 12 October 2021
Irkutsk Oblast	Bratsk	Andrey Chernyshev	United Russia	United Russia	5 October 2016 – 18 September 2020
Irkutsk Oblast	Bratsk	Vacant			18 September 2020 – 12 October 2021
Kaliningrad Oblast	Kaliningrad	Alexander Pyatikop	United Russia	United Russia	5 October 2016 – 12 October 2021
Kaliningrad Oblast	Central	Alexey Silanov	United Russia	United Russia	5 October 2016 – 10 May 2018
Kaliningrad Oblast	Central	Alexander Yaroshuk	United Russia	United Russia	9 September 2018 – 12 October 2021
Kaluga Oblast	Kaluga	Aleksandr Avdeyev	United Russia	United Russia	5 October 2016 – 12 October 2021
Kaluga Oblast	Obninsk	Gennady Sklyar	United Russia	United Russia	5 October 2016 – 12 October 2021
Kemerovo Oblast	Kemerovo	Tatyana Alexeyeva	United Russia	United Russia	5 October 2016 – 12 October 2021
Kemerovo Oblast	Prokopyevsk	Dmitry Islamov	United Russia	United Russia	5 October 2016 – 12 October 2021
Kemerovo Oblast	Zavodsky	Pavel Fedyaev	United Russia	United Russia	5 October 2016 – 12 October 2021
Kemerovo Oblast	Novokuznetsk	Alexander Maximov	United Russia	United Russia	5 October 2016 – 12 October 2021
Kirov Oblast	Novokuznetsk	Rakhim Azimov	United Russia	United Russia	5 October 2016 – 12 October 2021
Kirov Oblast	Kirovo-Chepetsk	Oleg Valenchuk	United Russia	United Russia	5 October 2016 – 12 October 2021
Kostroma Oblast	Kostroma	Alexey Sitnikov	United Russia	United Russia	5 October 2016 – 12 October 2021
Kurgan Oblast	Kurgan	Alexander Iltyakov	United Russia	United Russia	5 October 2016 – 12 October 2021
Kursk Oblast	Kursk	Tatyana Voronina	United Russia	United Russia	5 October 2016 – 12 October 2021
Kursk Oblast	Seimsky	Viktor Karamyshev	United Russia	United Russia	5 October 2016 – 9 July 2019
Kursk Oblast	Seimsky	Aleksey Zolotarev	United Russia	United Russia	23 September 2020 – 12 October 2021
Leningrad Oblast	Vsevolozhsk	Vladimir Drachev	United Russia	United Russia	5 October 2016 – 12 October 2021
Leningrad Oblast	Kingisepp	Sergey Naryshkin	United Russia	United Russia	5 October 2016 – 5 October 2016
Leningrad Oblast	Kingisepp	Sergey Yakhnyuk	United Russia	United Russia	10 September 2017 – 12 October 2021
Leningrad Oblast	Volkhov	Sergey Petrov	United Russia	United Russia	5 October 2016 – 12 October 2021
Lipetsk Oblast	Lipetsk	Nikolay Bortsov	United Russia	United Russia	5 October 2016 – 12 October 2021
Lipetsk Oblast	Levoberezhny	Mikhail Tarasenko	United Russia	United Russia	5 October 2016 – 12 October 2021
Magadan Oblast	Magadan	Oxana Bondar	United Russia	United Russia	5 October 2016 – 12 October 2021
Moscow Oblast	Balashikha	Maksim Surayev	United Russia	United Russia	5 October 2016 – 12 October 2021
Moscow Oblast	Dmitrov	Irina Rodnina	United Russia	United Russia	5 October 2016 – 12 October 2021
Moscow Oblast	Kolomna	Yelena Serova	United Russia	United Russia	5 October 2016 – 12 October 2021
Moscow Oblast	Krasnogorsk	Martin Shakkum	United Russia	United Russia	5 October 2016 – 12 October 2021
Moscow Oblast	Lyubertsy	Lidiya Antonova	United Russia	United Russia	5 October 2016 – 12 October 2021
Moscow Oblast	Odintsovo	Oxana Pushkina	United Russia	United Russia	5 October 2016 – 12 October 2021
Moscow Oblast	Orekhovo-Zuyevo	Valentina Kabanova	United Russia	United Russia	5 October 2016 – 12 October 2021
Moscow Oblast	Podolsk	Viacheslav Fetisov	United Russia	United Russia	5 October 2016 – 12 October 2021
Moscow Oblast	Sergiyev Posad	Sergey Pakhomov	United Russia	United Russia	5 October 2016 – 12 October 2021
Moscow Oblast	Serpukhov	Yury Oleynikov	United Russia	United Russia	5 October 2016 – 12 October 2021
Moscow Oblast	Shchyolkovo	Sergey Zhigarev	Liberal Democratic Party	Liberal Democratic Party	5 October 2016 – 12 October 2021
Murmansk Oblast	Murmansk	Alexey Veller	United Russia	United Russia	5 October 2016 – 12 October 2021
Nizhny Novgorod Oblast	Nizhny Novgorod	Vladimir Panov	United Russia	United Russia	5 October 2016 – 17 January 2018
Nizhny Novgorod Oblast	Nizhny Novgorod	Dmitry Svatkovsky	United Russia	United Russia	9 September 2018 – 12 October 2021
Nizhny Novgorod Oblast	Prioksky	Denis Moskvin	United Russia	United Russia	5 October 2016 – 12 October 2021
Nizhny Novgorod Oblast	Avtozavodsky	Natalya Nazarova	United Russia	United Russia	5 October 2016 – 12 October 2021
Nizhny Novgorod Oblast	Kanavinsky	Vadim Bulavinov	United Russia	United Russia	5 October 2016 – 12 October 2021
Nizhny Novgorod Oblast	Bor	Artyom Kavinov	United Russia	United Russia	5 October 2016 – 12 October 2021
Novgorod Oblast	Novgorod	Alexander Korovnikov	United Russia	United Russia	5 October 2016 – 11 August 2018
Novgorod Oblast	Novgorod	Yury Bobryshev	United Russia	United Russia	8 September 2019 – 12 October 2021
Novosibirsk Oblast	Novosibirsk	Andrey Kalichenko	United Russia	United Russia	5 October 2016 – 12 October 2021
Novosibirsk Oblast	Central	Maxim Kudryavtsev	United Russia	United Russia	5 October 2016 – 12 October 2021
Novosibirsk Oblast	Iskitim	Aleksandr Karelin	United Russia	United Russia	5 October 2016 – 25 September 2020
Novosibirsk Oblast	Iskitim	Vacant			25 September 2020 – 12 October 2021
Novosibirsk Oblast	Barabinsk	Viktor Ignatov	United Russia	United Russia	5 October 2016 – 12 October 2021
Omsk Oblast	Omsk	Viktor Shreyder	United Russia	United Russia	5 October 2016 – 12 October 2021
Omsk Oblast	Moskalenki	Oleg Smolin	Communist Party	Communist Party	5 October 2016 – 12 October 2021
Omsk Oblast	Lyubinsky	Andrey Golushko	United Russia	United Russia	5 October 2016 – 12 October 2021
Orenburg Oblast	Orenburg	Yury Mishcheryakov	United Russia	United Russia	5 October 2016 – 12 October 2021
Orenburg Oblast	Buguruslan	Igor Sukharev	United Russia	United Russia	5 October 2016 – 24 July 2020
Orenburg Oblast	Buguruslan	Vacant			24 July 2020 – 12 October 2021
Orenburg Oblast	Orsk	Viktor Zavarzin	United Russia	United Russia	5 October 2016 – 12 October 2021
Oryol Oblast	Oryol	Nikolay Kovalyov	United Russia	United Russia	5 October 2016 – 5 April 2019
Oryol Oblast	Oryol	Olga Pilipenko	United Russia	United Russia	8 September 2019 – 12 October 2021
Penza Oblast	Penza	Sergey Yesyakov	United Russia	United Russia	5 October 2016 – 12 October 2021
Penza Oblast	Lermontovsky	Leonid Levin	A Just Russia	A Just Russia	5 October 2016 – 22 January 2020
Penza Oblast	Lermontovsky	Aleksandr Samokutyayev	A Just Russia	A Just Russia	23 September 2020 – 12 October 2021
Pskov Oblast	Pskov	Alexander Kozlovsky	United Russia	United Russia	5 October 2016 – 12 October 2021
Rostov Oblast	Rostov	Larisa Tutova	United Russia	United Russia	5 October 2016 – 12 October 2021
Rostov Oblast	Nizhnedonskoy	Mikhail Yemelyanov	A Just Russia	A Just Russia	5 October 2016 – 12 October 2021
Rostov Oblast	Taganrog	Yury Kobzev	United Russia	United Russia	5 October 2016 – 21 December 2020
Rostov Oblast	Taganrog	Vacant			21 December 2020 – 12 October 2021
Rostov Oblast	Southern	Mikhail Chernyshyov	United Russia	United Russia	5 October 2016 – 12 October 2021
Rostov Oblast	Belaya Kalitva	Alexander Sholokhov	United Russia	United Russia	5 October 2016 – 12 October 2021
Rostov Oblast	Shakhty	Maxim Shchablykin	United Russia	United Russia	5 October 2016 – 12 October 2021
Rostov Oblast	Volgodonsk	Viktor Deryabkin	United Russia	United Russia	5 October 2016 – 12 October 2021
Ryazan Oblast	Ryazan	Andrei Krasov	United Russia	United Russia	5 October 2016 – 12 October 2021
Ryazan Oblast	Skopin	Yelena Mitina	United Russia	United Russia	5 October 2016 – 12 October 2021
Samara Oblast	Samara	Nadezhda Kolesnikova	United Russia	United Russia	5 October 2016 – 13 June 2018
Samara Oblast	Samara	Alexander Khinshtein	United Russia	United Russia	9 September 2018 – 12 October 2021
Samara Oblast	Tolyatti	Vladimir Bokk	United Russia	United Russia	5 October 2016 – 12 October 2021
Samara Oblast	Krasnoglinsky	Viktor Kazakov	United Russia	United Russia	5 October 2016 – 12 October 2021
Samara Oblast	Zhigulyovsk	Yevgeny Serper	United Russia	United Russia	5 October 2016 – 12 October 2021
Samara Oblast	Promyshlenny	Igor Stankevich	United Russia	United Russia	5 October 2016 – 12 October 2021
Saratov Oblast	Saratov	Oleg Grishchenko	United Russia	United Russia	5 October 2016 – 17 June 2017
Saratov Oblast	Saratov	Olga Alimova	Communist Party	Communist Party	9 September 2018 – 12 October 2021
Saratov Oblast	Balakovo	Nikolay Pankov	United Russia	United Russia	5 October 2016 – 12 October 2021
Saratov Oblast	Balashov	Mikhail Isayev	United Russia	United Russia	5 October 2016 – 3 October 2017
Saratov Oblast	Balashov	Yevgeny Primakov Jr.	United Russia	United Russia	9 September 2018 – 25 June 2020
Saratov Oblast	Balashov	Vacant			25 June 2020 – 12 October 2021
Saratov Oblast	Engels	Vasily Maximov	United Russia	United Russia	5 October 2016 – 12 October 2021
Sakhalin Oblast	Sakhalin	Georgy Karlov	United Russia	United Russia	5 October 2016 – 12 October 2021
Sverdlovsk Oblast	Sverdlovsk	Andrey Alshevskikh	United Russia	United Russia	5 October 2016 – 12 October 2021
Sverdlovsk Oblast	Kamensk-Uralsky	Lev Kovpak	United Russia	United Russia	5 October 2016 – 12 October 2021
Sverdlovsk Oblast	Beryozovsky	Sergei Tchepikov	United Russia	United Russia	5 October 2016 – 12 October 2021
Sverdlovsk Oblast	Nizhny Tagil	Alexey Balyberdin	United Russia	United Russia	5 October 2016 – 12 October 2021
Sverdlovsk Oblast	Asbest	Maxim Ivanov	United Russia	United Russia	5 October 2016 – 12 October 2021
Sverdlovsk Oblast	Pervouralsk	Zelimkhan Mutsoev	United Russia	United Russia	5 October 2016 – 12 October 2021
Sverdlovsk Oblast	Serov	Sergey Bidonko	United Russia	United Russia	5 October 2016 – 13 December 2018
Sverdlovsk Oblast	Serov	Anton Shipulin	United Russia	United Russia	8 September 2019 – 12 October 2021
Smolensk Oblast	Smolensk	Sergey Neverov	United Russia	United Russia	5 October 2016 – 12 October 2021
Smolensk Oblast	Roslavl	Olga Okuneva	United Russia	United Russia	5 October 2016 – 12 October 2021
Tambov Oblast	Tambov	Alexander Polyakov	United Russia	United Russia	5 October 2016 – 12 October 2021
Tambov Oblast	Rasskazovo	Alexander Zhupikov	United Russia	United Russia	5 October 2016 – 12 October 2021
Tver Oblast	Tver	Svetlana Maximova	United Russia	United Russia	5 October 2016 – 12 October 2021
Tver Oblast	Zavolzhsky	Vladimir Vasilyev	United Russia	United Russia	5 October 2016 – 3 October 2017
Tver Oblast	Zavolzhsky	Sergey Veremeenko	United Russia	United Russia	9 September 2018 – 12 October 2021
Tomsk Oblast	Tomsk	Alexei Didenko	Liberal Democratic Party	Liberal Democratic Party	5 October 2016 – 12 October 2021
Tomsk Oblast	Ob	Tatyana Solomatina	United Russia	United Russia	5 October 2016 – 12 October 2021
Tula Oblast	Tula	Viktor Dzyuba	United Russia	United Russia	5 October 2016 – 12 October 2021
Tula Oblast	Novomoskovsk	Vladimir Afonsky	United Russia	United Russia	5 October 2016 – 12 October 2021
Tyumen Oblast	Tyumen	Ernest Valeev	United Russia	United Russia	5 October 2016 – 12 October 2021
Tyumen Oblast	Zavodoukovsk	Ivan Kvitka	United Russia	United Russia	5 October 2016 – 12 October 2021
Ulyanovsk Oblast	Ulyanovsk	Alexey Kurinny	Communist Party	Communist Party	5 October 2016 – 12 October 2021
Ulyanovsk Oblast	Radishchevo	Vladislav Tretiak	United Russia	United Russia	5 October 2016 – 12 October 2021
Chelyabinsk Oblast	Chelyabinsk	Andrey Baryshev	United Russia	United Russia	5 October 2016 – 12 October 2021
Chelyabinsk Oblast	Metallurgichesky	Vladimir Burmatov	United Russia	United Russia	5 October 2016 – 12 October 2021
Chelyabinsk Oblast	Korkino	Anatoly Litovchenko	United Russia	United Russia	5 October 2016 – 12 October 2021
Chelyabinsk Oblast	Magnitogorsk	Vitaly Bakhmetyev	United Russia	United Russia	5 October 2016 – 12 October 2021
Chelyabinsk Oblast	Zlatoust	Oleg Kolesnikov	United Russia	United Russia	5 October 2016 – 12 October 2021
Yaroslavl Oblast	Yaroslavl	Alexander Gribov	United Russia	United Russia	5 October 2016 – 23 January 2020
Yaroslavl Oblast	Yaroslavl	Andrei Kovalenko	United Russia	United Russia	23 September 2020 – 12 October 2021
Yaroslavl Oblast	Rostov	Anatoly Greshnevikov	A Just Russia	A Just Russia	5 October 2016 – 12 October 2021
Moscow	Babushkinsky	Ivan Teterin	United Russia	United Russia	5 October 2016 – 12 October 2021
Moscow	Kuntsevo	Vyacheslav Lysakov	United Russia	United Russia	5 October 2016 – 12 October 2021
Moscow	Leningradsky	Galina Khovanskaya	A Just Russia	A Just Russia	5 October 2016 – 12 October 2021
Moscow	Lyublino	Pyotr Tolstoy	United Russia	United Russia	5 October 2016 – 12 October 2021
Moscow	Medvedkovo	Denis Parfenov	Communist Party	Communist Party	5 October 2016 – 12 October 2021
Moscow	Nagatinsky	Yelena Panina	United Russia	United Russia	5 October 2016 – 12 October 2021
Moscow	New Moscow	Dmitry Sablin	United Russia	United Russia	5 October 2016 – 12 October 2021
Moscow	Orekhovo–Borisovo	Lyubov Dukhanina	United Russia	United Russia	5 October 2016 – 12 October 2021
Moscow	Perovo	Sergei Zheleznyak	United Russia	United Russia	5 October 2016 – 12 October 2021
Moscow	Preobrazhensky	Anton Zharkov	United Russia	United Russia	5 October 2016 – 12 October 2021
Moscow	Tushino	Gennady Onishchenko	United Russia	United Russia	5 October 2016 – 12 October 2021
Moscow	Khovrino	Irina Belykh	United Russia	United Russia	5 October 2016 – 12 October 2021
Moscow	Central	Nikolay Gonchar	United Russia	United Russia	5 October 2016 – 12 October 2021
Moscow	Cheryomushki	Dmitry Morozov	United Russia	United Russia	5 October 2016 – 12 October 2021
Moscow	Chertanovo	Anatoly Vyborny	United Russia	United Russia	5 October 2016 – 12 October 2021
Saint Petersburg	Eastern	Igor Divinsky	United Russia	United Russia	5 October 2016 – 12 October 2021
Saint Petersburg	Western	Sergey Vostretsov	United Russia	United Russia	5 October 2016 – 12 October 2021
Saint Petersburg	Northern	Yevgeny Marchenko	United Russia	United Russia	5 October 2016 – 12 October 2021
Saint Petersburg	North East	Yelena Drapeko	A Just Russia	A Just Russia	5 October 2016 – 12 October 2021
Saint Petersburg	North West	Vladimir Katenev	United Russia	United Russia	5 October 2016 – 12 October 2021
Saint Petersburg	Central	Vladimir Bortko	Communist Party	Communist Party	5 October 2016 – 12 October 2021
Saint Petersburg	South East	Mikhail Romanov	United Russia	United Russia	5 October 2016 – 12 October 2021
Saint Petersburg	Southern	Vitaly Milonov	United Russia	United Russia	5 October 2016 – 12 October 2021
Sevastopol	Sevastopol	Dmitry Belik	United Russia	United Russia	5 October 2016 – 12 October 2021
Jewish Autonomous Oblast	Jewish	Anatoly Tikhomirov	United Russia	United Russia	5 October 2016 – 12 October 2021
Nenets Autonomous Okrug	Nenets	Sergey Kotkin	United Russia	United Russia	5 October 2016 – 12 October 2021
Khanty-Mansi Autonomous Okrug	Khanty-Mansiysk	Pavel Zavalny	United Russia	United Russia	5 October 2016 – 12 October 2021
Khanty-Mansi Autonomous Okrug	Nizhnevartovsk	Alexander Sidorov	United Russia	United Russia	5 October 2016 – 12 October 2021
Chukotka Autonomous Okrug	Chukotka	Valentina Rudchenko	United Russia	United Russia	5 October 2016 – 12 October 2021
Yamalo-Nenets Autonomous Okrug	Yamalo-Nenets	Grigory Ledkov	United Russia	United Russia	5 October 2016 – 25 September 2020
Yamalo-Nenets Autonomous Okrug	Yamalo-Nenets	Vacant			25 September 2020 – 12 October 2021
Russia	United Russia list	Dmitry Medvedev	United Russia	United Russia	refused to take seat
Russia	United Russia list	Irina Yarovaya	United Russia	United Russia	5 October 2016 – 12 October 2021
Russia	United Russia list	Yury Berezutsky	United Russia	United Russia	5 October 2016 – 12 October 2021
Russia	United Russia list	Viktor Pinsky	United Russia	United Russia	5 October 2016 – 12 October 2021
Russia	United Russia list	Yegor Borisov	United Russia	United Russia	refused to take seat
Russia	United Russia list	Galina Danchikova	United Russia	United Russia	5 October 2016 – 12 October 2021
Russia	United Russia list	Joseph Kobzon	United Russia	United Russia	5 October 2016 – 30 August 2018
Russia	United Russia list	Alexander Yakubovsky	United Russia	United Russia	25 September 2018 – 12 October 2021
Russia	United Russia list	Nikolay Nikolaev	United Russia	United Russia	5 October 2016 – 12 October 2021
Russia	United Russia list	Nikolay Buduyev	United Russia	United Russia	5 October 2016 – 12 October 2021
Russia	United Russia list	Artur Chilingarov	United Russia	United Russia	5 October 2016 – 12 October 2021
Russia	United Russia list	Larisa Shoygu	United Russia	United Russia	5 October 2016 – 12 October 2021
Russia	United Russia list	Aman Tuleyev	United Russia	United Russia	refused to take seat
Russia	United Russia list	Natalya Kuvshinova	United Russia	United Russia	5 October 2016 – 12 October 2021
Russia	United Russia list	Irina Yevtushenko	United Russia	United Russia	5 October 2016 – 13 September 2017
Russia	United Russia list	Oleg Bykov	United Russia	United Russia	10 October 2017 – 12 October 2021
Russia	United Russia list	Ivan Belekov	United Russia	United Russia	5 October 2016 – 12 October 2021
Russia	United Russia list	Vladimir Melnik	United Russia	United Russia	5 October 2016 – 12 October 2021
Russia	United Russia list	Nikolay Gerasimenko	United Russia	United Russia	5 October 2016 – 12 October 2021
Russia	United Russia list	Yevgeny Kosyanenko	United Russia	United Russia	5 October 2016 – 12 October 2021
Russia	United Russia list	Valery Yelykomov	United Russia	United Russia	5 October 2016 – 12 October 2021
Russia	United Russia list	Alexander Fokin	United Russia	United Russia	5 October 2016 – 12 October 2021
Russia	United Russia list	Yevgeny Choinzonov	United Russia	United Russia	refused to take seat
Russia	United Russia list	Anton Gorelkin	United Russia	United Russia	5 October 2016 – 12 October 2021
Russia	United Russia list	Alexander Zhukov	United Russia	United Russia	5 October 2016 – 12 October 2021
Russia	United Russia list	Dmitry Perminov	United Russia	United Russia	5 October 2016 – 12 October 2021
Russia	United Russia list	Vladimir Yakushev	United Russia	United Russia	refused to take seat
Russia	United Russia list	Vladimir Pushkaryov	United Russia	United Russia	5 October 2016 – 12 October 2021
Russia	United Russia list	Anatoly Karpov	United Russia	United Russia	5 October 2016 – 12 October 2021
Russia	United Russia list	Tatyana Gogoleva	United Russia	United Russia	5 October 2016 – 12 October 2021
Russia	United Russia list	Nikolay Brykin	United Russia	United Russia	5 October 2016 – 12 October 2021
Russia	United Russia list	Andrey Vetluzhskikh	United Russia	United Russia	5 October 2016 – 12 October 2021
Russia	United Russia list	Alexander Petrov	United Russia	United Russia	5 October 2016 – 12 October 2021
Russia	United Russia list	Pavel Krasheninnikov	United Russia	United Russia	5 October 2016 – 12 October 2021
Russia	United Russia list	Yelena Yampolskaya	United Russia	United Russia	5 October 2016 – 12 October 2021
Russia	United Russia list	Vasily Shishkoyedov	United Russia	United Russia	5 October 2016 – 12 October 2021
Russia	United Russia list	Dmitry Vyatkin	United Russia	United Russia	5 October 2016 – 12 October 2021
Russia	United Russia list	Rustem Khamitov	United Russia	United Russia	refused to take seat
Russia	United Russia list	Mikhail Bugera	United Russia	United Russia	5 October 2016 – 12 October 2021
Russia	United Russia list	Inga Yumasheva	United Russia	United Russia	5 October 2016 – 12 October 2021
Russia	United Russia list	Rafael Mardanshin	United Russia	United Russia	5 October 2016 – 12 October 2021
Russia	United Russia list	Rima Batalova	United Russia	United Russia	5 October 2016 – 12 October 2021
Russia	United Russia list	Ramzil Ishsarin	United Russia	United Russia	5 October 2016 – 12 October 2021
Russia	United Russia list	Farit Ganiyev	United Russia	United Russia	5 October 2016 – 12 October 2021
Russia	United Russia list	Igor Sapko	United Russia	United Russia	5 October 2016 – 12 October 2021
Russia	United Russia list	Andrey Isayev	United Russia	United Russia	5 October 2016 – 12 October 2021
Russia	United Russia list	Alexander Vasilenko	United Russia	United Russia	5 October 2016 – 12 October 2021
Russia	United Russia list	Rustam Minnikhanov	United Russia	United Russia	refused to take seat
Russia	United Russia list	Irek Zinnurov	United Russia	United Russia	5 October 2016 – 12 October 2021
Russia	United Russia list	Marat Akhmetov	United Russia	United Russia	refused to take seat
Russia	United Russia list	Olga Pavlova	United Russia	United Russia	5 October 2016 – 12 October 2021
Russia	United Russia list	Alexander Sidyakin	United Russia	United Russia	5 October 2016 – 13 November 2018
Russia	United Russia list	Boris Mendelevich	United Russia	United Russia	28 November 2018 – 12 October 2021
Russia	United Russia list	Airat Farrakhov	United Russia	United Russia	5 October 2016 – 12 October 2021
Russia	United Russia list	Valentin Chaika	United Russia	United Russia	5 October 2016 – 12 October 2021
Russia	United Russia list	Irek Boguslavsky	United Russia	United Russia	5 October 2016 – 12 October 2021
Russia	United Russia list	Murat Gadylshin	United Russia	United Russia	5 October 2016 – 12 October 2021
Russia	United Russia list	Marad Bariyev	United Russia	United Russia	5 October 2016 – 12 October 2021
Russia	United Russia list	Ravil Khusnulin	United Russia	United Russia	5 October 2016 – 12 October 2021
Russia	United Russia list	Vladimir Shamanov	United Russia	United Russia	5 October 2016 – 12 October 2021
Russia	United Russia list	Grigory Balykhin	United Russia	United Russia	5 October 2016 – 12 October 2021
Russia	United Russia list	Leonid Simanovsky	United Russia	United Russia	5 October 2016 – 12 October 2021
Russia	United Russia list	Vladimir Gutenev	United Russia	United Russia	5 October 2016 – 12 October 2021
Russia	United Russia list	Marina Bespalova	United Russia	United Russia	5 October 2016 – 12 October 2021
Russia	United Russia list	Roman Romanenko	United Russia	United Russia	5 October 2016 – 12 October 2021
Russia	United Russia list	Vyacheslav Volodin	United Russia	United Russia	5 October 2016 – 12 October 2021
Russia	United Russia list	Yevgeny Moskvichyov	United Russia	United Russia	5 October 2016 – 12 October 2021
Russia	United Russia list	Olga Batalina	United Russia	United Russia	5 October 2016 – 12 October 2021
Russia	United Russia list	Gleb Khor	United Russia	United Russia	5 October 2016 – 12 October 2021
Russia	United Russia list	Anna Kuznetsova	United Russia	United Russia	refused to take seat
Russia	United Russia list	Tatyana Kasayeva	United Russia	United Russia	5 October 2016 – 12 October 2021
Russia	United Russia list	Tamara Frolova	United Russia	United Russia	5 October 2016 – 12 October 2021
Russia	United Russia list	Nina Chernyaeva	United Russia	United Russia	5 October 2016 – 12 October 2021
Russia	United Russia list	Ivan Firyulin	United Russia	United Russia	5 October 2016 – 12 October 2021
Russia	United Russia list	Anatoly Petrov	United Russia	United Russia	5 October 2016 – 12 October 2021
Russia	United Russia list	Alexander Nosov	United Russia	United Russia	5 October 2016 – 12 October 2021
Russia	United Russia list	Vyacheslav Nikonov	United Russia	United Russia	5 October 2016 – 12 October 2021
Russia	United Russia list	Vasily Piskaryov	United Russia	United Russia	5 October 2016 – 12 October 2021
Russia	United Russia list	Viktor Kidyaev	United Russia	United Russia	5 October 2016 – 12 October 2021
Russia	United Russia list	Alena Arshinova	United Russia	United Russia	5 October 2016 – 12 October 2021
Russia	United Russia list	Alexander Vorobyov	United Russia	United Russia	5 October 2016 – 12 October 2021
Russia	United Russia list	Marat Safin	United Russia	United Russia	5 October 2016 – 26 May 2017
Russia	United Russia list	Nikolay Malov	United Russia	United Russia	30 June 2017 – 12 October 2021
Russia	United Russia list	Svetlana Solntseva	United Russia	United Russia	5 October 2016 – 12 October 2021
Russia	United Russia list	Sergey Chindyaskin	United Russia	United Russia	5 October 2016 – 12 October 2021
Russia	United Russia list	Olga Savastyanova	United Russia	United Russia	5 October 2016 – 12 October 2021
Russia	United Russia list	Elena Vtorygina	United Russia	United Russia	5 October 2016 – 12 October 2021
Russia	United Russia list	Svetlana Zhurova	United Russia	United Russia	5 October 2016 – 12 October 2021
Russia	United Russia list	Alexey Lyashchenko	United Russia	United Russia	5 October 2016 – 12 October 2021
Russia	United Russia list	Yevgeny Fyodorov	United Russia	United Russia	5 October 2016 – 12 October 2021
Russia	United Russia list	Alexander Vasilyev	United Russia	United Russia	5 October 2016 – 12 October 2021
Russia	United Russia list	Valentina Tereshkova	United Russia	United Russia	5 October 2016 – 12 October 2021
Russia	United Russia list	Valery Ivanov	United Russia	United Russia	5 October 2016 – 12 October 2021
Russia	United Russia list	Ilya Osipov	United Russia	United Russia	5 October 2016 – 12 October 2021
Russia	United Russia list	Nikolay Makarovets	United Russia	United Russia	refused to take seat
Russia	United Russia list	Valentin Subbot	United Russia	United Russia	5 October 2016 – 12 October 2021
Russia	United Russia list	Nikolay Valuyev	United Russia	United Russia	5 October 2016 – 12 October 2021
Russia	United Russia list	Nikolay Lyubimov	United Russia	United Russia	5 October 2016 – 17 February 2017
Russia	United Russia list	Natalya Pilyus	United Russia	United Russia	1 March 2017 – 12 October 2021
Russia	United Russia list	Nikolay Petrunin	United Russia	United Russia	5 October 2016 – 12 October 2021
Russia	United Russia list	Artem Turov	United Russia	United Russia	5 October 2016 – 12 October 2021
Russia	United Russia list	Andrey Vorobyov	United Russia	United Russia	refused to take seat
Russia	United Russia list	Denis Kravchenko	United Russia	United Russia	5 October 2016 – 12 October 2021
Russia	United Russia list	Vladimir Kononov	United Russia	United Russia	5 October 2016 – 12 October 2021
Russia	United Russia list	Otari Arshba	United Russia	United Russia	5 October 2016 – 12 October 2021
Russia	United Russia list	Mikhail Terentyev	United Russia	United Russia	5 October 2016 – 12 October 2021
Russia	United Russia list	Natalya Sanina	United Russia	United Russia	5 October 2016 – 12 October 2021
Russia	United Russia list	Yevgeny Savchenko	United Russia	United Russia	refused to take seat
Russia	United Russia list	Olga Germanova	United Russia	United Russia	5 October 2016 – 12 October 2021
Russia	United Russia list	Nikolay Zemtsov	United Russia	United Russia	5 October 2016 – 12 October 2021
Russia	United Russia list	Alexander Bryksin	United Russia	United Russia	5 October 2016 – 12 October 2021
Russia	United Russia list	Valery Skrug	United Russia	United Russia	5 October 2016 – 12 October 2021
Russia	United Russia list	Alexey Gordeyev	United Russia	United Russia	refused to take seat
Russia	United Russia list	Vladimir Bogodukhov	United Russia	United Russia	5 October 2016 – 12 October 2021
Russia	United Russia list	Andrey Makarov	United Russia	United Russia	5 October 2016 – 12 October 2021
Russia	United Russia list	Yevgeny Revenko	United Russia	United Russia	5 October 2016 – 12 October 2021
Russia	United Russia list	Gennady Kulik	United Russia	United Russia	5 October 2016 – 12 October 2021
Russia	United Russia list	Mikhail Gulevsky	United Russia	United Russia	5 October 2016 – 12 October 2021
Russia	United Russia list	Tatyana Saprykina	United Russia	United Russia	5 October 2016 – 12 October 2021
Russia	United Russia list	Vasily Golubev	United Russia	United Russia	refused to take seat
Russia	United Russia list	Alexey Kobilev	United Russia	United Russia	5 October 2016 – 12 October 2021
Russia	United Russia list	Olga Timofeeva	United Russia	United Russia	5 October 2016 – 12 October 2021
Russia	United Russia list	Alexander Klykanov	United Russia	United Russia	5 October 2016 – 12 October 2021
Russia	United Russia list	Viktor Vodolatsky	United Russia	United Russia	5 October 2016 – 12 October 2021
Russia	United Russia list	Alexander Kaminsky	United Russia	United Russia	5 October 2016 – 12 October 2021
Russia	United Russia list	Aleksey Lavrinenko	United Russia	United Russia	5 October 2016 – 12 October 2021
Russia	United Russia list	Bator Aduchiyev	United Russia	United Russia	5 October 2016 – 12 October 2021
Russia	United Russia list	Anton Getta	United Russia	United Russia	5 October 2016 – 12 October 2021
Russia	United Russia list	Ramazan Abdulatipov	United Russia	United Russia	refused to take seat
Russia	United Russia list	Buvaisar Saitiev	United Russia	United Russia	5 October 2016 – 12 October 2021
Russia	United Russia list	Gajimet Safaraliyev	United Russia	United Russia	5 October 2016 – 12 October 2021
Russia	United Russia list	Magomed Gadzhiyev	United Russia	United Russia	5 October 2016 – 12 October 2021
Russia	United Russia list	Zaur Askenderov	United Russia	United Russia	5 October 2016 – 12 October 2021
Russia	United Russia list	Murad Gajiyev	United Russia	United Russia	5 October 2016 – 12 October 2021
Russia	United Russia list	Yury Levitsky	United Russia	United Russia	5 October 2016 – 12 October 2021
Russia	United Russia list	Ramzan Kadyrov	United Russia	United Russia	refused to take seat
Russia	United Russia list	Ahmed Dogayev	United Russia	United Russia	5 October 2016 – 12 October 2021
Russia	United Russia list	Magomed Selimkhanov	United Russia	United Russia	5 October 2016 – 12 October 2021
Russia	United Russia list	Shamsail Saraliyev	United Russia	United Russia	5 October 2016 – 12 October 2021
Russia	United Russia list	Yunus-bek Yevkurov	United Russia	United Russia	refused to take seat
Russia	United Russia list	Yushaa Gazgireev	United Russia	United Russia	5 October 2016 – 12 October 2021
Russia	United Russia list	Vyacheslav Bitarov	United Russia	United Russia	refused to take seat
Russia	United Russia list	Zurab Makiev	United Russia	United Russia	5 October 2016 – 12 October 2021
Russia	United Russia list	Yury Kokov	United Russia	United Russia	refused to take seat
Russia	United Russia list	Irina Maryash	United Russia	United Russia	5 October 2016 – 12 October 2021
Russia	United Russia list	Zaur Gekkiyev	United Russia	United Russia	5 October 2016 – 12 October 2021
Russia	United Russia list	Rashid Temrezov	United Russia	United Russia	refused to take seat
Russia	United Russia list	Mikhail Starshinov	United Russia	United Russia	5 October 2016 – 12 October 2021
Russia	United Russia list	Aslan Tkhakushinov	United Russia	United Russia	refused to take seat
Russia	United Russia list	Murat Khasanov	United Russia	United Russia	5 October 2016 – 12 October 2021
Russia	United Russia list	Vladimir Beketov	United Russia	United Russia	refused to take seat
Russia	United Russia list	Sergey Krivonosov	United Russia	United Russia	5 October 2016 – 12 October 2021
Russia	United Russia list	Natalya Kostenko	United Russia	United Russia	5 October 2016 – 12 October 2021
Russia	United Russia list	Vladimir Porkhanov	United Russia	United Russia	refused to take seat
Russia	United Russia list	Alexey Voyevoda	United Russia	United Russia	5 October 2016 – 12 October 2021
Russia	United Russia list	Aleksandr Skorobogatko	United Russia	United Russia	5 October 2016 – 2 December 2016
Russia	United Russia list	Svetlana Bessarab	United Russia	United Russia	6 December 2016 – 12 October 2021
Russia	United Russia list	Alexey Tkachov	United Russia	United Russia	5 October 2016 – 12 October 2021
Russia	United Russia list	Alexander Metkin	United Russia	United Russia	5 October 2016 – 17 February 2017
Russia	United Russia list	Dmitry Pirog	United Russia	United Russia	1 March 2017 – 12 October 2021
Russia	United Russia list	Sergey Aksyonov	United Russia	United Russia	refused to take seat
Russia	United Russia list	Natalya Poklonskaya	United Russia	United Russia	5 October 2016 – 12 October 2021
Russia	United Russia list	Mikhail Sheremet	United Russia	United Russia	5 October 2016 – 12 October 2021
Russia	United Russia list	Ruslan Balbek	United Russia	United Russia	5 October 2016 – 12 October 2021
Russia	United Russia list	Konstantin Bakharev	United Russia	United Russia	5 October 2016 – 12 October 2021
Russia	United Russia list	Andrey Kozenko	United Russia	United Russia	5 October 2016 – 12 October 2021
Russia	United Russia list	Dmitry Belik	United Russia	United Russia	5 October 2016 – 12 October 2021
Russia	United Russia list	Svetlana Savchenko	United Russia	United Russia	5 October 2016 – 12 October 2021
Russia	United Russia list	Sergey Sobyanin	United Russia	United Russia	refused to take seat
Russia	United Russia list	Nikolay Antoshkin	United Russia	United Russia	5 October 2016 – 12 October 2021
Russia	United Russia list	Stanislav Govorukhin	United Russia	United Russia	5 October 2016 – 14 June 2018
Russia	United Russia list	Tatyana Krivenko	United Russia	United Russia	12 July 2018 – 12 October 2021
Russia	United Russia list	Vladimir Resin	United Russia	United Russia	5 October 2016 – 12 October 2021
Russia	United Russia list	Viktor Seliverstov	United Russia	United Russia	5 October 2016 – 12 October 2021
Russia	United Russia list	Vladimir Krupennikov	United Russia	United Russia	5 October 2016 – 12 October 2021
Russia	United Russia list	Georgy Poltavchenko	United Russia	United Russia	refused to take seat
Russia	United Russia list	Yury Petrov	United Russia	United Russia	5 October 2016 – 12 October 2021
Russia	United Russia list	Sergey Boyarsky	United Russia	United Russia	5 October 2016 – 12 October 2021
Russia	Communist Party list	Gennady Zyuganov	Communist Party	Communist Party	5 October 2016 – 12 October 2021
Russia	Communist Party list	Svetlana Savitskaya	Communist Party	Communist Party	5 October 2016 – 12 October 2021
Russia	Communist Party list	Yury Afonin	Communist Party	Communist Party	5 October 2016 – 12 October 2021
Russia	Communist Party list	Zhores Alferov	Communist Party	Communist Party	5 October 2016 – 1 March 2019
Russia	Communist Party list	Mikhail Berulava	Communist Party	Communist Party	10 April 2019 – 12 October 2021
Russia	Communist Party list	Ivan Melnikov	Communist Party	Communist Party	5 October 2016 – 12 October 2021
Russia	Communist Party list	Vladimir Kashin	Communist Party	Communist Party	5 October 2016 – 12 October 2021
Russia	Communist Party list	Dmitry Novikov	Communist Party	Communist Party	5 October 2016 – 12 October 2021
Russia	Communist Party list	Sergey Reshulsky	Communist Party	Communist Party	5 October 2016 – 23 June 2017
Russia	Communist Party list	Rizvan Kurbanov	Communist Party	Communist Party	30 June 2017 – 12 October 2021
Russia	Communist Party list	Vakha Agayev	Communist Party	Communist Party	5 October 2016 – 12 October 2021
Russia	Communist Party list	Kazbek Taisayev	Communist Party	Communist Party	5 October 2016 – 12 October 2021
Russia	Communist Party list	Nikolay Osadchy	Communist Party	Communist Party	5 October 2016 – 12 October 2021
Russia	Communist Party list	Sergey Shargunov	Communist Party	Communist Party	5 October 2016 – 12 October 2021
Russia	Communist Party list	Alexander Yushchenko	Communist Party	Communist Party	5 October 2016 – 12 October 2021
Russia	Communist Party list	Viktor Goncharov	Communist Party	Communist Party	refused to take seat
Russia	Communist Party list	Anatoly Bifov	Communist Party	Communist Party	5 October 2016 – 12 October 2021
Russia	Communist Party list	Nikolay Arefyev	Communist Party	Communist Party	5 October 2016 – 12 October 2021
Russia	Communist Party list	Valentin Shurchanov	Communist Party	Communist Party	5 October 2016 – 12 October 2021
Russia	Communist Party list	Vladimir Pozdnyakov	Communist Party	Communist Party	5 October 2016 – 12 October 2021
Russia	Communist Party list	Yury Sinelshchikov	Communist Party	Communist Party	5 October 2016 – 12 October 2021
Russia	Communist Party list	Alexey Kornienko	Communist Party	Communist Party	5 October 2016 – 12 October 2021
Russia	Communist Party list	Sergey Gavrilov	Communist Party	Communist Party	5 October 2016 – 12 October 2021
Russia	Communist Party list	Oleg Lebedev	Communist Party	Communist Party	5 October 2016 – 12 October 2021
Russia	Communist Party list	Alexander Nekrasov	Communist Party	Communist Party	5 October 2016 – 12 October 2021
Russia	Communist Party list	Sergey Levchenko	Communist Party	Communist Party	refused to take seat
Russia	Communist Party list	Alexey Ponomaryov	Communist Party	Communist Party	5 October 2016 – 12 October 2021
Russia	Communist Party list	Nikolay Ivanov	Communist Party	Communist Party	5 October 2016 – 12 October 2021
Russia	Communist Party list	Pavel Dorokhin	Communist Party	Communist Party	5 October 2016 – 12 October 2021
Russia	Communist Party list	Sergey Panteleev	Communist Party	Communist Party	5 October 2016 – 12 October 2021
Russia	Communist Party list	Tamara Pletnyova	Communist Party	Communist Party	5 October 2016 – 12 October 2021
Russia	Communist Party list	Nikolay Vasiliev	Communist Party	Communist Party	refused to take seat
Russia	Communist Party list	Aleksey Russkikh	Communist Party	Communist Party	5 October 2016 – 17 September 2018
Russia	Communist Party list	Mikhail Avdeyev	Communist Party	Communist Party	26 September 2018 – 12 October 2021
Russia	Communist Party list	Alexander Tarnayev	Communist Party	Communist Party	refused to take seat
Russia	Communist Party list	Vladimir Blotsky	Communist Party	Communist Party	5 October 2016 – 12 October 2021
Russia	Communist Party list	Anatoly Lokot	Communist Party	Communist Party	refused to take seat
Russia	Communist Party list	Vera Ganzya	Communist Party	Communist Party	5 October 2016 – 12 October 2021
Russia	Communist Party list	Alexander Kravets	Communist Party	Communist Party	5 October 2016 – 12 October 2021
Russia	Communist Party list	Leonid Kalashnikov	Communist Party	Communist Party	5 October 2016 – 12 October 2021
Russia	Communist Party list	Nikolay Kolomeitsev	Communist Party	Communist Party	5 October 2016 – 12 October 2021
Russia	Communist Party list	Nikolay Ezersky	Communist Party	Communist Party	5 October 2016 – 12 October 2021
Russia	Communist Party list	Valery Rashkin	Communist Party	Communist Party	5 October 2016 – 12 October 2021
Russia	Liberal Democratic Party list	Vladimir Zhirinovsky	Liberal Democratic Party	Liberal Democratic Party	5 October 2016 – 12 October 2021
Russia	Liberal Democratic Party list	Igor Lebedev	Liberal Democratic Party	Liberal Democratic Party	5 October 2016 – 12 October 2021
Russia	Liberal Democratic Party list	Leonid Slutsky	Liberal Democratic Party	Liberal Democratic Party	5 October 2016 – 12 October 2021
Russia	Liberal Democratic Party list	Yaroslav Nilov	Liberal Democratic Party	Liberal Democratic Party	5 October 2016 – 12 October 2021
Russia	Liberal Democratic Party list	Mikhail Degtyarev	Liberal Democratic Party	Liberal Democratic Party	5 October 2016 – 12 October 2021
Russia	Liberal Democratic Party list	Alexander Kurdyumov	Liberal Democratic Party	Liberal Democratic Party	5 October 2016 – 12 October 2021
Russia	Liberal Democratic Party list	Dmitry Svishev	Liberal Democratic Party	Liberal Democratic Party	5 October 2016 – 12 October 2021
Russia	Liberal Democratic Party list	Sergey Karginov	Liberal Democratic Party	Liberal Democratic Party	5 October 2016 – 12 October 2021
Russia	Liberal Democratic Party list	Vasily Tarasyuk	Liberal Democratic Party	Liberal Democratic Party	5 October 2016 – 6 May 2017
Russia	Liberal Democratic Party list	Andrey Andreychenko	Liberal Democratic Party	Liberal Democratic Party	31 May 2017 – 12 October 2021
Russia	Liberal Democratic Party list	Ivan Sukharev	Liberal Democratic Party	Liberal Democratic Party	5 October 2016 – 12 October 2021
Russia	Liberal Democratic Party list	Pavel Shperov	Liberal Democratic Party	Liberal Democratic Party	5 October 2016 – 12 October 2021
Russia	Liberal Democratic Party list	Valery Seleznev	Liberal Democratic Party	Liberal Democratic Party	5 October 2016 – 12 October 2021
Russia	Liberal Democratic Party list	Yury Volkov	Liberal Democratic Party	Liberal Democratic Party	5 October 2016 – 12 October 2021
Russia	Liberal Democratic Party list	Andrey Lugovoy	Liberal Democratic Party	Liberal Democratic Party	5 October 2016 – 12 October 2021
Russia	Liberal Democratic Party list	Yury Napso	Liberal Democratic Party	Liberal Democratic Party	5 October 2016 – 12 October 2021
Russia	Liberal Democratic Party list	Sergey Natarov	Liberal Democratic Party	Liberal Democratic Party	5 October 2016 – 12 October 2021
Russia	Liberal Democratic Party list	Alexander Starovoitov	Liberal Democratic Party	Liberal Democratic Party	5 October 2016 – 12 October 2021
Russia	Liberal Democratic Party list	Vadim Dengin	Liberal Democratic Party	Liberal Democratic Party	5 October 2016 – 12 October 2021
Russia	Liberal Democratic Party list	Kirill Cherkasov	Liberal Democratic Party	Liberal Democratic Party	5 October 2016 – 12 October 2021
Russia	Liberal Democratic Party list	Yelena Strokova	Liberal Democratic Party	Liberal Democratic Party	5 October 2016 – 12 October 2021
Russia	Liberal Democratic Party list	Andrey Svintsov	Liberal Democratic Party	Liberal Democratic Party	5 October 2016 – 12 October 2021
Russia	Liberal Democratic Party list	Anton Morozov	Liberal Democratic Party	Liberal Democratic Party	5 October 2016 – 12 October 2021
Russia	Liberal Democratic Party list	Dmitry Savelyev	Liberal Democratic Party	Liberal Democratic Party	5 October 2016 – 12 October 2021
Russia	Liberal Democratic Party list	Sergey Katasonov	Liberal Democratic Party	Liberal Democratic Party	5 October 2016 – 12 October 2021
Russia	Liberal Democratic Party list	Sergey Ivanov	Liberal Democratic Party	Liberal Democratic Party	5 October 2016 – 12 October 2021
Russia	Liberal Democratic Party list	Alexander Sherin	Liberal Democratic Party	Liberal Democratic Party	5 October 2016 – 12 October 2021
Russia	Liberal Democratic Party list	Igor Toroshchin	Liberal Democratic Party	Liberal Democratic Party	5 October 2016 – 12 October 2021
Russia	Liberal Democratic Party list	Danil Shilkov	Liberal Democratic Party	Liberal Democratic Party	5 October 2016 – 3 October 2019
Russia	Liberal Democratic Party list	Maxim Zaytsev	Liberal Democratic Party	Liberal Democratic Party	3 October 2019 – 12 October 2021
Russia	Liberal Democratic Party list	Sergey Marinin	Liberal Democratic Party	Liberal Democratic Party	5 October 2016 – 12 October 2021
Russia	Liberal Democratic Party list	Vitaly Pashin	Liberal Democratic Party	Liberal Democratic Party	5 October 2016 – 12 October 2021
Russia	Liberal Democratic Party list	Boris Chernyshov	Liberal Democratic Party	Liberal Democratic Party	5 October 2016 – 12 October 2021
Russia	Liberal Democratic Party list	Vasily Vlasov	Liberal Democratic Party	Liberal Democratic Party	5 October 2016 – 12 October 2021
Russia	Liberal Democratic Party list	Oleg Lavrov	Liberal Democratic Party	Liberal Democratic Party	5 October 2016 – 12 October 2021
Russia	Liberal Democratic Party list	Vladimir Sysoyev	Liberal Democratic Party	Liberal Democratic Party	5 October 2016 – 12 March 2019.
Russia	Liberal Democratic Party list	Evgeny Markov	Liberal Democratic Party	Liberal Democratic Party	12 March 2019 – 12 October 2021
Russia	A Just Russia list	Sergey Mironov	A Just Russia	A Just Russia	5 October 2016 – 12 October 2021
Russia	A Just Russia list	Alexander Terentyev	A Just Russia	A Just Russia	5 October 2016 – 12 October 2021
Russia	A Just Russia list	Gajimurad Omarov	A Just Russia	A Just Russia	5 October 2016 – 12 October 2021
Russia	A Just Russia list	Valery Gazzayev	A Just Russia	A Just Russia	5 October 2016 – 12 October 2021
Russia	A Just Russia list	Oleg Shein	A Just Russia	A Just Russia	5 October 2016 – 12 October 2021
Russia	A Just Russia list	Igor Ananskikh	A Just Russia	A Just Russia	5 October 2016 – 12 October 2021
Russia	A Just Russia list	Olga Yepifanova	A Just Russia	A Just Russia	5 October 2016 – 12 October 2021
Russia	A Just Russia list	Oleg Nikolayev	A Just Russia	A Just Russia	5 October 2016 – 29 January 2020
Russia	A Just Russia list	Igor Molyakov	A Just Russia	A Just Russia	5 February 2020 – 12 October 2021
Russia	A Just Russia list	Sergey Doronin	A Just Russia	A Just Russia	refused to take seat
Russia	A Just Russia list	Vadim Belousov	A Just Russia	A Just Russia	5 October 2016 – 12 October 2021
Russia	A Just Russia list	Alexey Chepa	A Just Russia	A Just Russia	5 October 2016 – 12 October 2021
Russia	A Just Russia list	Sergey Kryuchek	A Just Russia	A Just Russia	5 October 2016 – 12 October 2021
Russia	A Just Russia list	Nikolay Ryzhak	A Just Russia	A Just Russia	5 October 2016 – 12 October 2021
Russia	A Just Russia list	Alexander Remezkov	A Just Russia	A Just Russia	5 October 2016 – 12 October 2021
Russia	A Just Russia list	Alexander Burkov	A Just Russia	A Just Russia	5 October 2016 – 10 October 2017
Russia	A Just Russia list	Dmitry Ionin	A Just Russia	A Just Russia	25 October 2017 – 12 October 2021
Russia	A Just Russia list	Valery Gartung	A Just Russia	A Just Russia	5 October 2016 – 12 October 2021
Russia	A Just Russia list	Oleg Nilov	A Just Russia	A Just Russia	5 October 2016 – 12 October 2021

== See also ==
- List of members of the 7th Russian State Duma who were not re-elected
