= Nadezhda Kolesnikova (disambiguation) =

Nadezhda Kolesnikova (1882–1964) was a leader of the revolutionary movement in Russia.

Nadezhda Kolesnikova may also refer to:

- Nadezhda Ilyina (née Kolesnikova) (1949–2013), Soviet sprinter
- Nadezhda Kolesnikova (politician) (born 1960), member of the 7th Russian State Duma
