= Viktor Antonov =

Viktor Antonov may refer to:

- Viktor Antonov (politician) (born 1951), Russian politician
- Viktor Antonov (artist) (1972–2025), Bulgarian art director
