= Roman Antonov =

Russian businessman & politician (born 1972)

Roman Valer'evich Antonov
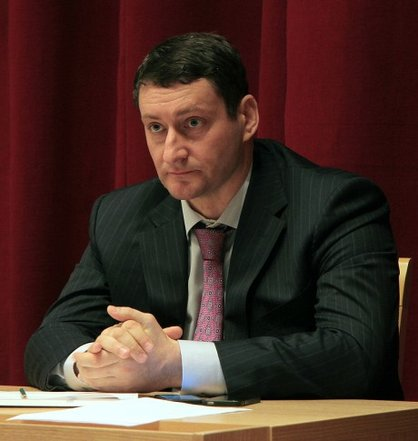
- Occupation: Politician

Roman Valerevich Antonov (Russian: Рома́н Вале́рьевич Анто́нов) is a Russian businessman and politician who represents United Russia as a deputy in the State Duma of the Russian Federation. Since 2012, he has served as Assistant Presidential Envoy to the Volga Federal District.

== Biography ==
He was born on January 24, 1972, in Gorky.

In 2006 Antonov graduated from the N. I. Lobachevsky State University of Nizhny Novgorod.

== Career ==
On December 2, 2007, he was elected to the 5th State Duma as part of the federal list of candidates nominated by the United Russia.

Since 2012, he has been an Assistant Presidential Envoy in the Volga Federal District.

Since November 11, 2015 he has been the Deputy Governor, Deputy Chairman of the Government of the Nizhny Novgorod region. He left the post in February 2018.

== Criminal Incidents ==
On the night of July 3–4, 2004, according to a friend who witnessed the incident, Antonov was preparing his car for a street race. After starting from a traffic light, the car clipped a pedestrian with its side. The impact was so strong that the pedestrian died from the injuries. According to Antonov's acquaintance, he did not drive far from the starting point. However, given that the deputy's Nissan could accelerate to 200 km/h in 10 seconds, even a short stretch of road was enough to reach deadly speed.

A criminal case was opened by the Prioksky District Prosecutor's Office under the Criminal Procedure Code of the Russian Federation, and an investigation was launched. The case was later transferred from the district to the regional prosecutor's office, but ultimately, the lawmaker was not held accountable and faced no punishment.

On September 19, 2017, journalists reported that Antonov was using a helicopter valued at €1.5 million. It was noted that his official income was insufficient to afford the purchase and maintenance of such an aircraft. The Prosecutor's Office of the Nizhny Novgorod Region conducted an investigation into the media reports regarding Deputy Governor Roman Antonov's use of a Eurocopter Colibri helicopter and found no violations of the law.
