= Arkady Svistunov =

Russian politician

Arkady Svistunov MP
- Аркадий Свистунов
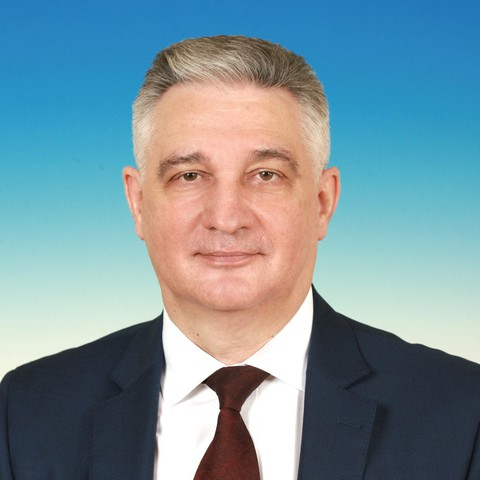
- official portrait, circa 2021

Member of the State Duma (Party List Seat)
- Incumbent
- Assumed office 12 October 2021

Personal details
- Born: 28 April 1965 (age 60) Donetsk, Rostov Oblast, Russian SFSR, USSR
- Party: Liberal Democratic Party of Russia
- Education: Higher School of the KGB

Arkady Nikolaevich Svistunov (Russian: Аркадий Николаевич Свистунов; born 28 April 1965, Donetsk) is a Russian political figure and a deputy of the 5th and 8th State Dumas.

After graduating from the Higher School of the KGB in 1990, Svistunov worked in a number of enterprises, including the Center-service, Volga-Kama Commercial Bank, Commercial Mortgage and Investment Bank Sochi. In 2002, he was appointed Vice-President of the Promsvyazbank. Later he headed the Department of Regional Development of the Commercial Mortgage and Investment Bank Sochi. In 2007, he was elected deputy of the 5th State Duma. In 2021, he was re-elected for the 8th State Duma.

== Sanctions ==
Due to his support for the Russo-Ukrainian war, he is under sanctions imposed by several countries. Since September 14, 2022, he has been sanctioned by all member states of the European Union. Since March 11, 2022, he has been under sanctions by the United Kingdom. On March 24, 2022, he was added to the United States sanctions list for “participating in Putin’s war” and “supporting the Kremlin’s efforts to invade Ukraine”.

Since February 24, 2022, he has been on Canada’s sanctions list of “close associates of the regime” for voting in favor of recognizing the independence of the “so-called republics in Donetsk and Luhansk". He has been sanctioned by Switzerland since February 25, 2022, by Australia since February 26, 2022, and by Japan since April 12, 2022.
