= Irek Boguslavsky =

Russian politician (born 1967)

Irek Boguslavsky MP
- Ирек Богуславский
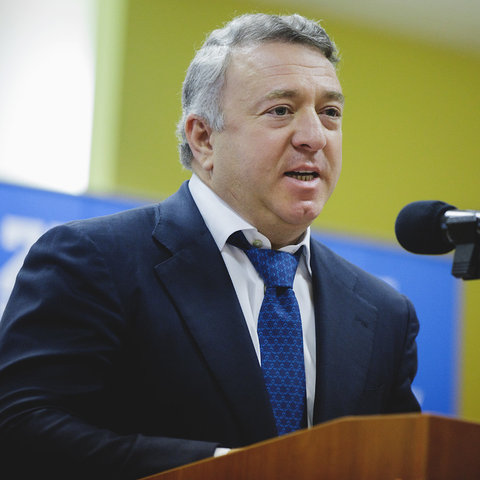

Member of the State Duma (Party List Seat)
- Incumbent
- Assumed office 24 December 2007

Personal details
- Born: Irek Borisovich Boguslavsky; 9 September 1967 (age 58) Kazan, Tatar ASSR, Russian SFSR, Soviet Union
- Party: United Russia
- Education: Kazan State Finance and Economics Institute

Irek Borisovich Boguslavsky (Russian: Ирек Борисович Богуславский; born 9 September 1967) is a Russian political figure, who has been a deputy of the State Duma since the 5th convocation.

In 1991 Boguslavsky graduated from the Kazan State Finance and Economics Institute. From 1999 to 2005, he was engaged in various businesses, including selling cars and tailoring. Also, he was one of the founders of the Real Trans Hair clinic that specializes in hair transplantation. Boguslavsky started his political career in 2007 when he was elected deputy of 5th State Duma. Later he was re-elected for the 6th (2011–2016), 7th (2016–2021), and 8th State Dumas (since 2021). According to Istories.media, as of July 2021, throughout these 14 years, Irek Boguslavsky has not said a word during the public discussions in the State Duma.

== Legislative activity ==
From 2007 to 2019 Irek Boguslavsky was a deputy of the State Duma of the V, VI and VII convocations. At that time he co-authored 238 legislative initiatives and amendments to draft federal laws.

== Sanctions ==
He was sanctioned by the UK government in 2022 in relation to the Russo-Ukrainian War.

He is one of the members of the State Duma the United States Treasury sanctioned on 24 March 2022 in response to the 2022 Russian invasion of Ukraine.

== Awards ==
- Order "For Merit to the Fatherland"
- Gratitude of the Government of the Russian Federation (15 July 2010) — for merits in legislative activity and many years of conscientious work.
