= Marat Zagidullov =

Tatar businessman

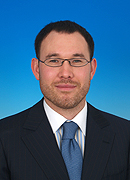
- Born: May 6, 1974 (age 52); Tatarstan, USSR

Marat Faridovich Zagidullov (Russian: Мара́т Фари́дович Загидýллов; born June 5, 1974) is a Tatar businessman, investor, and politician. He is also a former city manager of Kazan, former deputy of the State Duma, member of the United Russia political party, and co-owner of the scientific and production company Potok Inter.

== Education ==
In April 2006, a press release was distributed by the Kazan City Duma apparatus, which stated that "Marat Zagidullov has three degrees in higher education, including a diploma from the University of California at Los Angeles." However, after an investigation by Kazan journalist Irek Murtazin, who concluded that Marat Zagidullov was expelled from the University of California, Zagidullov's biography was amended on the official website of the executive committee: instead of "graduated from the University of California" they wrote "he studied at the University of California."

== Career ==
At the age of 22, he became the general director of the commercial house Rus, owned by his uncle, Rafael Gimalov.

From 1998 to 1999, Zagidullov was the executive director of the Central Fuel Company. In 2000, he was appointed Head of the Property Management Department of Finance, Credit, Insurance and Foreign Economic Organizations of the State Property Committee. Two years after the appointment, Zagidullov's apartment was robbed, and significant damage was caused:

A lot of value can be found in rented apartments of some high officials. On February 25, 2002, the 27-year-old head of the State Property Committee of the Russian Federation, Marat Zagidullov, said that at 5.30 am five unidentified men in sportswear got into his rented apartment on Bolshaya Dorogomilovskaya Street, broke the lock, tied up a sleepy lodger and stole $6,000, a Pioneer TV, a cashmere jacket, a mink coat, a Panasonic video recorder, a Sony CD player, a Cartier wristwatch, a Sony video camera, and a leather jacket and then disappeared. The total material damage amounted to 3.6 million rubles.

In 2004, Zagidullov was Advisor to the President of Transcreditbank, First CEO Deputy of Motovilikha Plants and then Chairman of the Board of Directors of Ekonatsbank, which subsequently went bankrupt. From 2005, Zagidullov was Chairman of the Board of Directors of Sibintek. In 2006, he headed the executive committee of the Kazan municipal union.

From 2007 to 2011, he was a State Duma deputy on the federal list of United Russia party candidates.

== City manager of Kazan ==
When Zagidullov was city manager of Kazan, he organized the purchase of nearly 800 Chinese buses to replenish the city's public transport fleet through a network of intermediary firms that ensured a several-fold increase in the purchase price compared to the manufacturer's price. Within a few years, the city authorities decided to completely get rid of these buses due to frequent breakdowns and a lack of spare parts.

The company Sibintek, shares of which Zagidullov bought from YUKOS before taking office as Kazan city manager, became the executor of the largest IT programs of the Kazan mayor's office headed by himself.

== Criminal case ==
In 2013, Nikolai Bukhvalov, CEO of Motovilikha Plants, appealed to the Investigative Committee of Russia, requesting a legal assessment of the actions of former shareholder Marat Zagidullov. According to the applicant, while managing the enterprise from 2002 to 2009, Zagidullov, acting together with others, caused property damage to the company of more than 1.268 billion rubles by issuing loans to a number of legal entities that were not subsequently returned. Shortly thereafter, a criminal case was initiated into the question of property damage to Motovilikha Plants. However, in November 2014, the criminal case was discontinued "due to the absence of corpus delicti in the actions of the defendants."

== Investments ==
Zagidullov invested in the system integrator Sibintek, the system of instant payments Qiwi India and a social network advertising business. Zagidullov's investment activities are regularly covered by the Kommersant newspaper journalist Elena Kiselyova.

=== Potok Inter ===
In 2014, Zagidullov acquired half of the air disinfection unit manufacturer Potok Inter, estimating the amount of further investment in the company at $200 million over the next three years. According to Zagidullov, the production of Potok Inter has no analogues, destroys any microorganisms (including viruses), passing them through a tense electric field, and is patented in Russia, the EU and the USA. The company's website states that air disinfection occurs due to the effect of electroporation of the microorganism cell membrane. Potok Inter is a consistently unprofitable enterprise; the total loss for 2013–2018 amounted to 500 million rubles. In 2016, the company announced that it intended to file for bankruptcy.

=== Eurokappa ===
Zagidullov is the primary owner of Sun Smile LLC (trademark "Eurokappa"), whose losses for 2017 and 2018 amounted to 16.8 and 85.2 million rubles, respectively.
