= Adam Amirilayev =

Russian politician

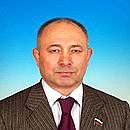
Adam Bashirovich Amirilayev

Adam Bashirovich Amirilayev (Russian: Адам Баширович Амирилаев), born 20 May 1963 in Burtunay, Dagestan Autonomous Soviet Socialist Republic, is a Russian politician.

In 2007, Amirilayev graduated from Dagestan State University with a specialty in jurisprudence.

In the 2007 State Duma elections, he was elected to the State Duma as a United Russia deputy. Amirilayev is Vice-Chairman of the Committee for Public Associations and Religious Organisations.

On January 25, 2012, Amiraliev was appointed Head of the Office of the Federal Service for State Registration, Cadastre and Cartography for the Republic of Dagestan. He held this position until October 2014.

== Allegations of Pressure on the Investigation ==
On November 18, 2009, Chairman of the Investigative Committee under the Prosecutor’s Office of the Russian Federation, Aleksandr Bastrykin, submitted a complaint to the leadership of the State Duma regarding a group of deputies who, according to him, were actively using parliamentary inquiries for personal and propagandistic purposes. Bastrykin’s list included six Duma deputies: four from United Russia, one from the Communist Party (CPRF), and one from the Liberal Democratic Party of Russia (LDPR). Among them was the name of Adam Amiraliyev.

Bastrykin stated that Amiraliyev had proposed changing the pretrial detention measure for Magomedgichiyev, a member of an armed group, to a written pledge not to leave the area, citing a long-standing acquaintance with the Magomedgichiyev family. The Duma reacted negatively to Bastrykin’s letter, which was sent shortly after his address to deputies on October 7, 2009. Duma member Aleksandr Khinshtein remarked that the letter was “written in an emotional state,” referring to the tense reception Bastrykin had received during his visit to the Duma.
