= Mikhail Pitkevich =

Russian politician (born 1979)

- Михаил Питкевич
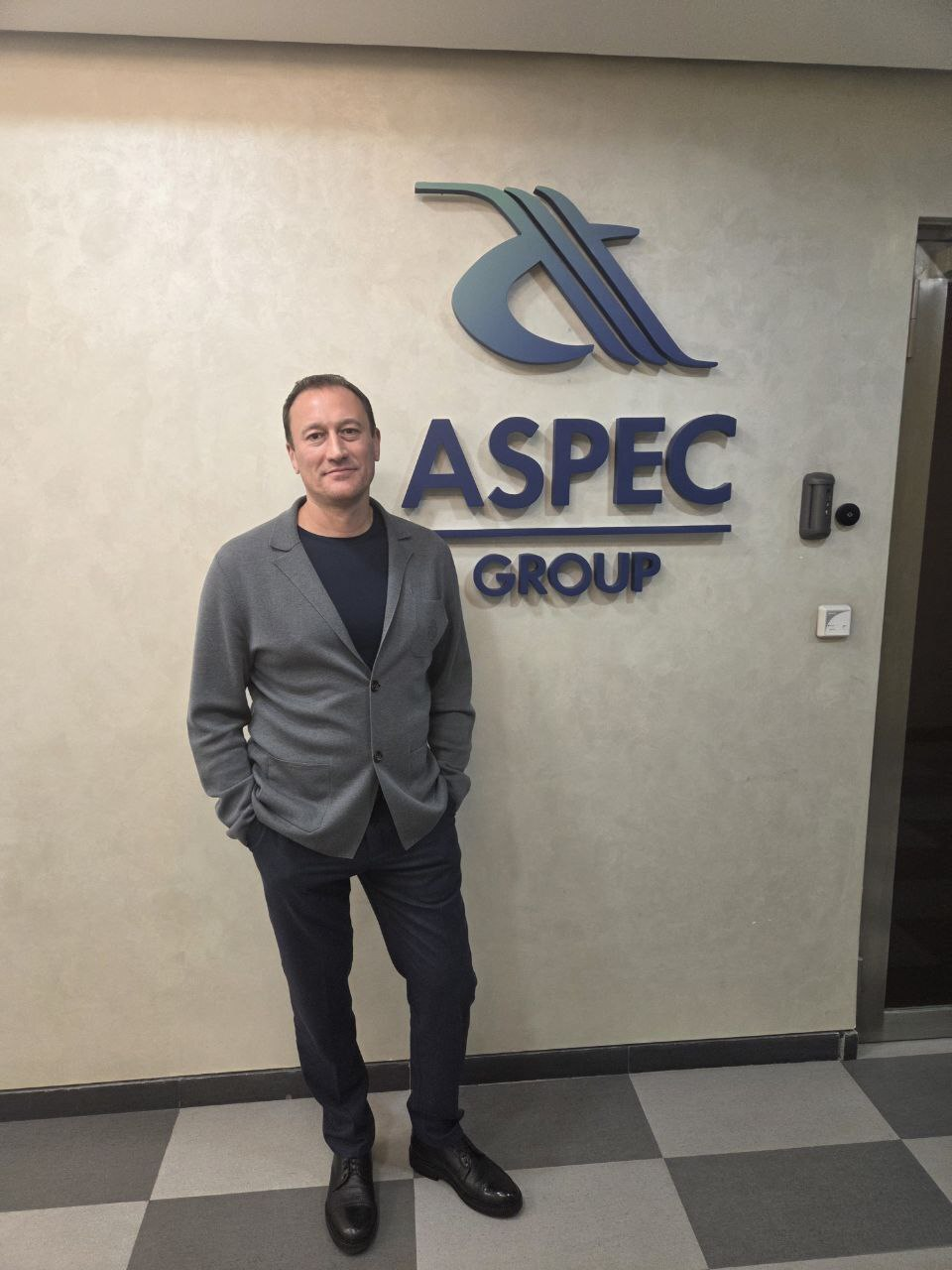
- Pitkevich in 2026

First Deputy Governor of Smolensk Oblast
- In office May 2012 – 23 September 2015

Member of the State Duma
- In office 2 December 2007 – December 2011

Personal details
- Born: Mikhail Yuryevich Pitkevich; 19 February 1979 (age 47) Glazov, Russia, Soviet Union
- Party: Independent
- Other political affiliations: Liberal Democratic Party of Russia

Mikhail Yuryevich Pitkevich (Russian: Михаил Юрьевич Питкевич; born 19 February 1979), is a Russian businessman and politician who had been the owner and head of ASPEC Group, a diversified company with operations in several sectors. Since the early 2000s, Pitkevich has pursued international opportunities across Central and Eastern Europe, and has since expanded his interests to a number of other countries, including in the Middle East.

Pitkevich served as a member of the State Duma, from 2007 to 2011. He also held the position of First Deputy Governor of the Smolensk Oblast from 2012 to 2015.

== Biography ==
Mikhail Pitkevich was born on 19 February 1979, Glazov (Udmurt ASSR). In 1991, his family moved to Izhevsk.

=== Education ===
In 1996, he enrolled in the Faculty of Economics at Udmurt State University. In 2001, Mikhail graduated from the International University in Moscow with a degree in management. In 2004, he graduated from graduate school at the All-Russian Centre for Living Standards (Moscow), and was awarded the academic degree of Candidate of Economic Sciences.

=== Business Ventures (1997-2007) ===
On 2 December 2007, Pitkevich became a member oIn 1997-1998, he founded and developed a company for the distribution of dairy products.

In the late 1990s and early 2000s, he was involved in the trade of oil and oil products, which allowed him to build his initial capital. In 2003, he sold the oil business, directing proceeds towards development.

From 2003 to 2005, he was involved in developing business-class housing in Russia, as well as hotels and residential real estate in the Czech Republic and Croatia. In 2006, Pitkevich acquired stakes in ASPEC Group and Izhcombank. He withdrew as a shareholder of Izhcombank in 2019.

=== Legislative and Executive Branch Roles (2007-2015) ===
On December 2, 2007, Pitkevich became a member of the State Duma as part of the Liberal Democratic Party of Russia (LDPR) faction. As a member of parliament, he actively participated in drafting legislation on socially significant issues. In December 2011, he left parliament and the LDPR.

From May 2012 to 2015, Pitkevich was the First Deputy Governor of Smolensk Oblast. In this role, he oversaw housing and communal services, roads, and agriculture. On 23 September 2015, Pitkevich resigned from office for family reasons, with connection with the birth of his third child.

=== Business Ventures (2015-Present) ===
In 2015, Pitkevich consolidated 100% ownership of ASPEC Group and has since focused on its development. The Group operates across several sectors: development (approximately 100,000 square meters of residential property commissioned annually), agriculture (a full-cycle organic agribusiness), automotive distribution (an official dealer of 19 brands), and timber processing (producing over 600,000 cubic meters of sawn timber per year). ASPEC finances complex surgical procedures for those in need and provides support to orphanages.

In 2019, he withdrew as a shareholder in Izhcombank.

As of 2026, he is involved in the construction of residential and office real estate in a number of countries, including the UAE.

== Family ==
Pitkevich is married. The couple has three children.
