= Yury Karabasov =

Russian politician (1939–2021)

Member of the State Duma
- In office 24 December 2007 – 21 December 2011

Rector of the National University of Science and Technology MISiS
- In office 1992–2007
- Preceded by: Juriy Dmitrievitsj Zjeleznov
- Succeeded by: Dmitry Livanov

Candidate Member of the Central Committee of the Communist Party of the Soviet Union
- In office 1986–1990

Personal details
- Born: 12 June 1939 Moscow, Russian SFSR, Soviet Union
- Died: 7 December 2021 (aged 82)
- Party: CPSU; United Russia
- Occupation: Professor

Yury Sergeyevich Karabasov (Russian: Юрий Сергеевич Карабасов; 12 June 1939 – 7 December 2021) was a Russian professor and politician. A member of United Russia, he served in the State Duma from 2007 to 2011.

Rector of the National University of Science and Technology “MISiS” (1992–2007). Doctor of Technical Sciences, professor. Served as President of MISiS from April 2007 to April 25, 2017.
