= Pavel Zyryanov =

Soviet Colonel general

Pavel Ivanovich Zyryanov
- Павел Иванович Зырянов
- Born: 16 March 1907; Glukhovskoye village, Semipalatinsk Oblast, Governor-Generalship of the Steppes, Russian Empire (now East Kazakhstan Region, Kazakhstan)
- Died: 3 January 1992 (aged 84); Moscow, Russia
- Military career
- Allegiance: Soviet Union
- Branch: Soviet Border Troops
- Service years: 1924–1972
- Rank: Colonel General
- Conflicts: World War II; Soviet–Japanese War; Hungarian Uprising of 1956
- Awards: Order of Lenin (3)

Pavel Ivanovich Zyryanov (Russian: Павел Иванович Зырянов; 16 March 1907 – 3 January 1992) was a Soviet colonel general, who served as commander of the Soviet Border Troops from 1952 to 1956 and 1957 to 1972.

== Early life ==
Zyryanov was born on 16 March 1907, to a family of Russian ethnicity. He graduated from a three-year parish school in Semipalatinsk in 1917. From 1919, he worked as a farm labourer. Zyryanov was appointed as secretary of a Komsomol cell in 1923.

== Military career ==
Zyryanov joined the Red Army in September 1924. He graduated from the Omsk Infantry School Named after M.V. Frunze in 1927. From 1927 to 1934, he served in the 9th Siberian Infantry Regiment of the Joint State Political Directorate troops in Novosibirsk and became member of the Communist Party of the Soviet Union. He later served as platoon commander from September 1927 and became member of the assistant chief of staff of the regiment from June 1930. In January 1933, he was appointed as head of the regimental school.

After graduating from the Military Academy of the Red Army named after M.V. Frunze in 1937, he was requested to transfer to headquarters of the Border Troops. Zyryanov agreed, but only after receiving a command position. In September 1937, he served as the head of the 9th Komissarov (Khanka) Border Detachment of NKVD at the Far Eastern Military District.

From May 1939, he served as the Chief of Staff of the NKVD Border Troops at Primorsky Krai.

=== World War II ===
In January 1942, he was appointed as the chief of the Border Troops in Primorsky Krai, which consisted units from Ministry of State Security and NKVD. During his service in the Far East, he actively participated in operations against Japanese, Manchu and White Guard sabotage and reconnaissance groups, in continuous border skirmishes and battles.

In August 1945, during the Soviet invasion of Manchuria, he led the district border guards based in Primorsky Krai to capture and destroy Japanese border detachments and garrisons located near the Soviet border with Manchukuo, capture and hold crossings across Amur and Ussuri rivers, and conduct offensive operations together with military units in the border. All these tasks were successfully accomplished by the troops of the district with minimal combat losses.

=== Post war ===
On 20 May 1952, he was appointed as head of the main directorate of border troops of the Ministry of State Security. In March 1953, the Ministry of State Security was abolished and the border troops were transferred to the jurisdiction of the Ministry of Internal Affairs. On 12 June 1954, he became a member of the Collegium of the Ministry of Internal Affairs.

On 28 May 1956, Zyryanov was transferred to KGB under the Council of Ministers of the Soviet Union and was appointed deputy head of the 3rd Main Directorate of the KGB. From October to November 1956, he was stationed in the Hungarian People's Republic, where he took an active role in crushing of the Hungarian Revolution of 1956.

Zyryanov was appointed as commander of the Soviet Border Troops in April 1957, and was transferred to the KGB at the Council of Ministers of the Soviet Union. At the same time, from September 1959, he was a member of the KGB Collegium under the Council of Ministers of the USSR.

From February 1964, he was part of the Soviet delegation to China to hold negotiations on controversial border issues between Soviet Union and China. In August 1964, he was the head of Soviet delegation at the negotiations on the determination of the border on the disputed areas between the two countries. During his tenure, China and Soviet Union fought in violent border clashes near Damansky Island and Tielieketi in 1969.

The twenty-year tenure of Zyryanov as chief of the Soviet Border Troops was assessed in most modern publications as positive and reformist. Ensuring reliable protection of the state border, Zyryanov carried out the reorganization and rearmament of the troops, ensuring their equipment was at the most modern level.

He was the author of the idea of creating mobile maneuverable firing units in the most dangerous sections of the border for rapid build-up of forces in an event of a threat of violation to the border. This idea was rejected by Zyryanov's successor Vadim Matrosov, but later it was implemented during the Soviet-Afghan War.

In December 1972, he retired from military service.

== Later life ==
After his retirement, he resided in Moscow. Zyryanov died on 3 January 1992, at the age of 84, and was buried at the Kuntsevo Cemetery in Moscow.

== Awards and decorations ==
USSR

Order of Lenin, thrice (24 November 1950, 14 February 1951, 15 March 1967)
Order of the October Revolution (31 August 1971)
Order of the Red Banner, seven times (20 September 1943, 3 November 1944, 8 September 1945, 5 November 1954, 18 December 1956, 10 December 1964, 27 May 1968)
Order of the Patriotic War, 1st class (11 March 1985)
Order of the Red Star, twice (14 February 1941, 16 March 1987)
Medal "For Distinction in Guarding the State Border of the USSR" (1950)
Medal "For the Victory over Germany in the Great Patriotic War 1941–1945" (1945)
Medal "For the Victory over Japan" (1945)
Jubilee Medal "Twenty Years of Victory in the Great Patriotic War 1941-1945" (1965)
Jubilee Medal "Thirty Years of Victory in the Great Patriotic War 1941–1945" (1975)
Jubilee Medal "Forty Years of Victory in the Great Patriotic War 1941–1945" (1985)
Jubilee Medal "In Commemoration of the 100th Anniversary of the Birth of Vladimir Ilyich Lenin" (1969)
Jubilee Medal "30 Years of the Soviet Army and Navy" (1948)
Jubilee Medal "40 Years of the Armed Forces of the USSR" (1957)
Jubilee Medal "50 Years of the Armed Forces of the USSR" (1967)
Jubilee Medal "60 Years of the Armed Forces of the USSR" (1978)
Jubilee Medal "70 Years of the Armed Forces of the USSR" (1988)
Medal "Veteran of the Armed Forces of the USSR" (1976)
Jubilee Medal "50 Years of the Soviet Militia" (1967)

Foreign

Medal of Sino-Soviet Friendship (China)
Order of the Red Banner (Mongolia)
Medal "50 Years of the Mongolian People's Revolution" (Mongolia)
Medal "30 Years of the Victory in Khalkhin-Gol" (Mongolia)
Order of the National Flag, 3rd class (North Korea)

== Dates of rank ==
- Captain: 1936
- Major: 27 September 1937
- Colonel: 31 May 1939
- Major general: 3 May 1942
- Lieutenant general: 15 July 1957
- Colonel general: 23 February 1961

== Bibliography ==
- Gorbachev, Aleksandr (2017). 10000 генералов страны (1940-2017) [10000 Generals of the Country (1940-2017)]. Moscow: Infogans.
- Petrov, N. (2010). Кто руководил органами госбезопасности 1941—1945 [Who Directed the State Security Agencies (1941-1945)]. Moscow: Mezhdunarodnoye obshchestvo «Memorial».
- Kolesnikov, G. (1978). Ордена и медали СССР [Orders and Medals of the USSR]. Moscow: Voenizdat.
