= Khizri Shikhsaidov =

Russian politician (1947–2026)

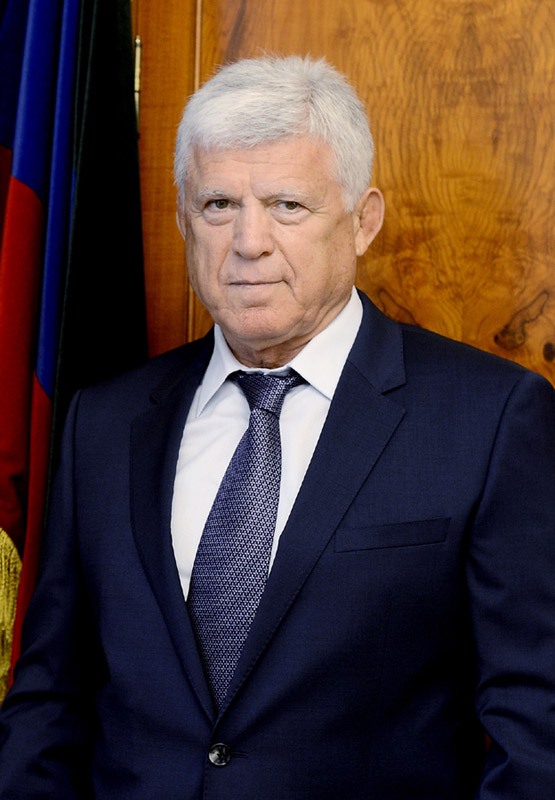
Shikhsaidov in 2015

Khizri Isaevich Shikhsaidov (Russian: Хизри Исаевич Шихсаидов, 1 August 1947 – 24 May 2026) was a Russian Kumyk politician. He was speaker of the People's Assembly of the Republic of Dagestan from 2013 to 2021.

Shikhsaidov died on 24 May 2026, at the age of 78.
