= Gleb Khor =

Russian politician

Gleb Khor MP
- Глеб Хор
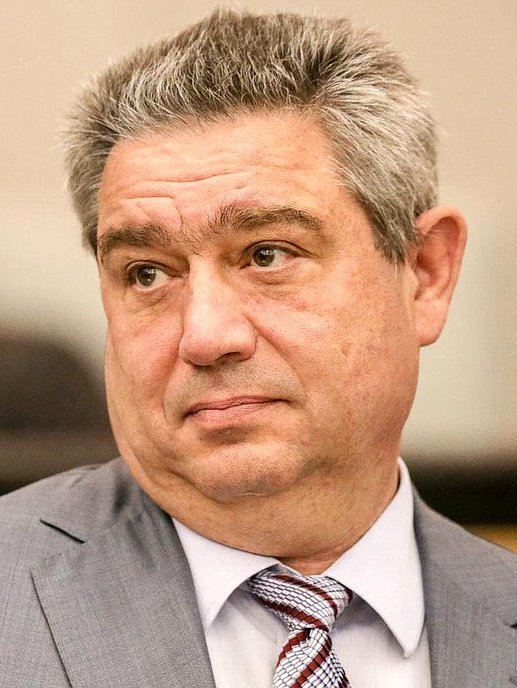
- At a plenary session in 2017

Member of the State Duma (Party List Seat)
- Incumbent
- Assumed office 29 December 2003

Personal details
- Born: 8 April 1963 (age 63) Bilytske, Dobropillia, Donetsk Oblast, Ukrainian SSR, USSR
- Party: United Russia
- Education: Moscow Mining Institute; Financial Academy under the Government of the Russian Federation

Gleb Yakovlevich Khor (Russian: Глеб Яковлевич Хор; born 8 April 1963, Bilytske, Dobropillia) is a Russian political figure and deputy of the 4th, 5th, 6th, 7th, and 8th State Dumas.

He attended the Moscow Mining Institute and then the Financial Academy. From 1982 to 1993, he worked in the coal mining industry. Later he continued his career in various investment companies, including Heopolis, Pharaon, Intrastkom. In 2003, he was elected deputy of the 4th State Duma from the Saratov Oblast constituency. Khor was re-elected in 2007, 2011, 2016, and 2021 for the 5th, 6th, 7th, and 8th State Dumas, respectively.

== Legislative activity ==
From 2003 to 2019, while serving as a deputy of the 4th, 5th, 6th, and 7th convocations of the State Duma, he co-authored 110 legislative initiatives and amendments to federal law drafts.

== Awards ==
- Order of Friendship
- Russian Federation Presidential Certificate of Honour
