= Yury Napso =

Russian politician

Yury Napso MP
- Юрий Напсо
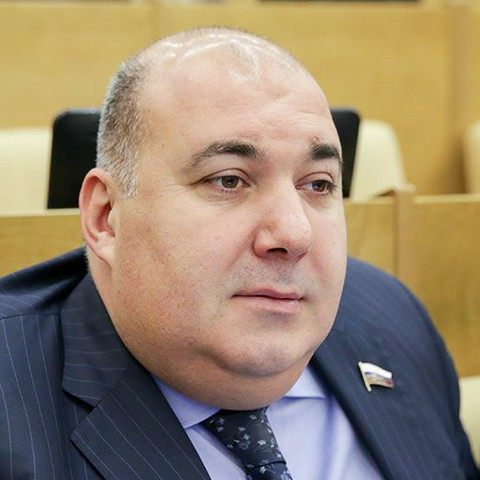

Member of the State Duma (Party List Seat)
- In office 24 December 2007 – 25 March 2025

Personal details
- Born: 17 April 1973 (age 53) Tuapse, Krasnodar Krai, Russian SFSR, Soviet Union
- Party: Liberal Democratic Party of Russia
- Education: Adyghe State University

Yury Aisovich Napso (Russian: Юрий Аисович Напсо; born 17 April 1973, Tuapse, Krasnodar Krai) is a Russian political figure and a former deputy of the 5th, 6th, 7th, and 8th State Dumas.

== Biography ==
Napso was born on April 17, 1973 in Tuapse, Krasnodar Krai.

He graduated from the Adyghe State University in 2000. In 2007 he completed postgraduate studies at the Griboyedov Institute of International Law and Economics. In 2010 he graduated from the Russian Presidential Academy of Public Administration with a degree in public and municipal administration.

Following the results of 2020, Napso became the wealthiest deputy of the State Duma from Krasnodar Krai, with an income of 21,4 mln rubles.

== Career ==
In 2000 Napso was appointed CEO of Rosnefteresurs CJSC. He also worked as an advisor to the deputy of the State Duma.

On December 2, 2007, he was elected deputy of the 5th State Duma. In 2011, 2017, and 2021, he was re-elected deputy of the 6th, 7th, and 8th State Dumas, respectively.

In 2023, Napso went on sick leave and went to the United Arab Emirates for treatment. He failed to return to Russia and was expelled by the State Duma for his prolonged absence without a valid reason on 3 April 2025.

== Awards ==
- Gratitude from the Government of the Russian Federation (2003)

== Sanctions ==
On February 23, 2022, he was included in the European Union sanctions list for "supporting and implementing actions and policies that undermine the territorial integrity, sovereignty, and independence of Ukraine, and that further destabilize Ukraine".

On February 24, 2022, he was added to Canada’s sanctions list of "close associates of the regime" for voting in favor of recognizing the independence of the "so-called republics in Donetsk and Luhansk".

On March 24, 2022, amid Russia’s invasion of Ukraine, he was included in the U.S. sanctions list for "complicity in Putin’s war" and "supporting the Kremlin’s efforts to invade Ukraine". The U.S. Department of State stated that members of the State Duma use their powers to persecute dissent and political opponents, violate freedom of information, and restrict the human rights and fundamental freedoms of Russian citizens.

Subsequently, on similar grounds, he was also sanctioned by the United Kingdom, Switzerland, Australia, Ukraine, Japan, and New Zealand.

== Family ==
Yuri Napso is married and has four children. His wife, Veronika Valeryevna Ivanchikova, is a deputy of the Legislative Assembly of Krasnodar Krai representing the LDPR party. His brother, Roman Napso, is a deputy of the Sochi City Assembly representing the United Russia party. Yuri Napso’s father, the former director of the Tuapsinsky meat processing plant, was murdered in 2002 near the building of the Arbitration Court of Krasnodar. The perpetrator was a 70-year-old opponent of Ais Napso who was detained immediately after the crime. According to the assailant, a resident of Karaevsk, Ais Napso owed him money for meat supplied to the plant, which had been the subject of a claim filed with the arbitration court.
