= Leonid Simanovsky =

Russian politician

Leonid Simanovsky MP
- Леонид Симановский
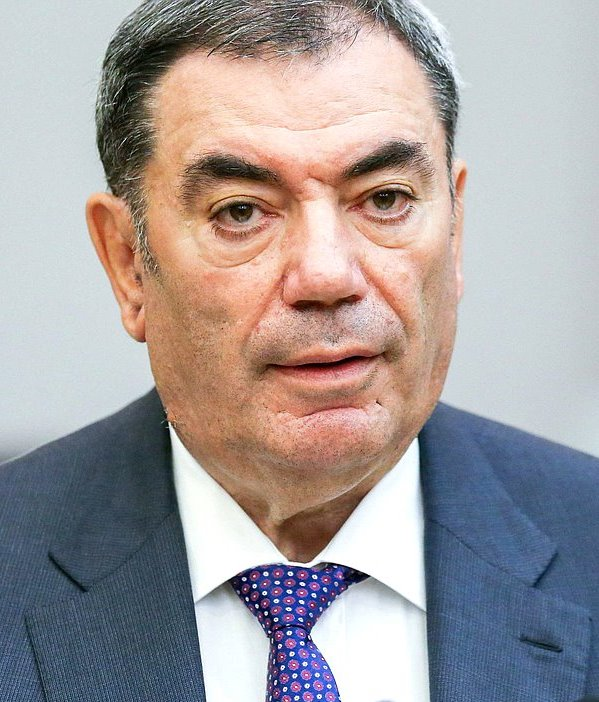
- Simanovsky in 2018

Member of the State Duma (Party List Seat)
- Incumbent
- Assumed office 29 December 2003

Personal details
- Born: 19 July 1949 (age 76) Kuybyshev, RSFSR, USSR
- Party: United Russia
- Spouse: Sofia Kimovna Simanovskaya
- Children: Svetlana (daughter)
- Education: Kuybyshev Planning Institute

Leonid Yakovlevich Simanovsky (Russian: Леонид Яковлевич Симановский; July 19, 1949) is a Russian businessman and political figure, serving as a deputy in the State Duma from the United Russia party list since 2003.

From 1996 to 2001, Simanovsky was a vice-president at Yukos, then one of the largest petroleum firms in Russia. In 2000, he founded and headed the company "Khimpromindustriya". In 2003, 2007, 2011, 2016, and 2021, he was consecutively elected as a deputy for the 4th, 5th, 6th, 7th, and 8th convocations of the State Duma. As a deputy, he belongs to the State Duma Committee on Budget & Taxes.

In 2021, Simanovsky was 85th on the Forbes list of 200 wealthiest Russian businessmen.

== Sanctions ==
He was sanctioned by the UK government in 2022 in relation to the Russo-Ukrainian War.

He is one of the members of the State Duma the United States Treasury sanctioned on 24 March 2022 in response to the 2022 Russian invasion of Ukraine.
