= Robert Schlegel =

Russian politician

- Роберт Шлегель
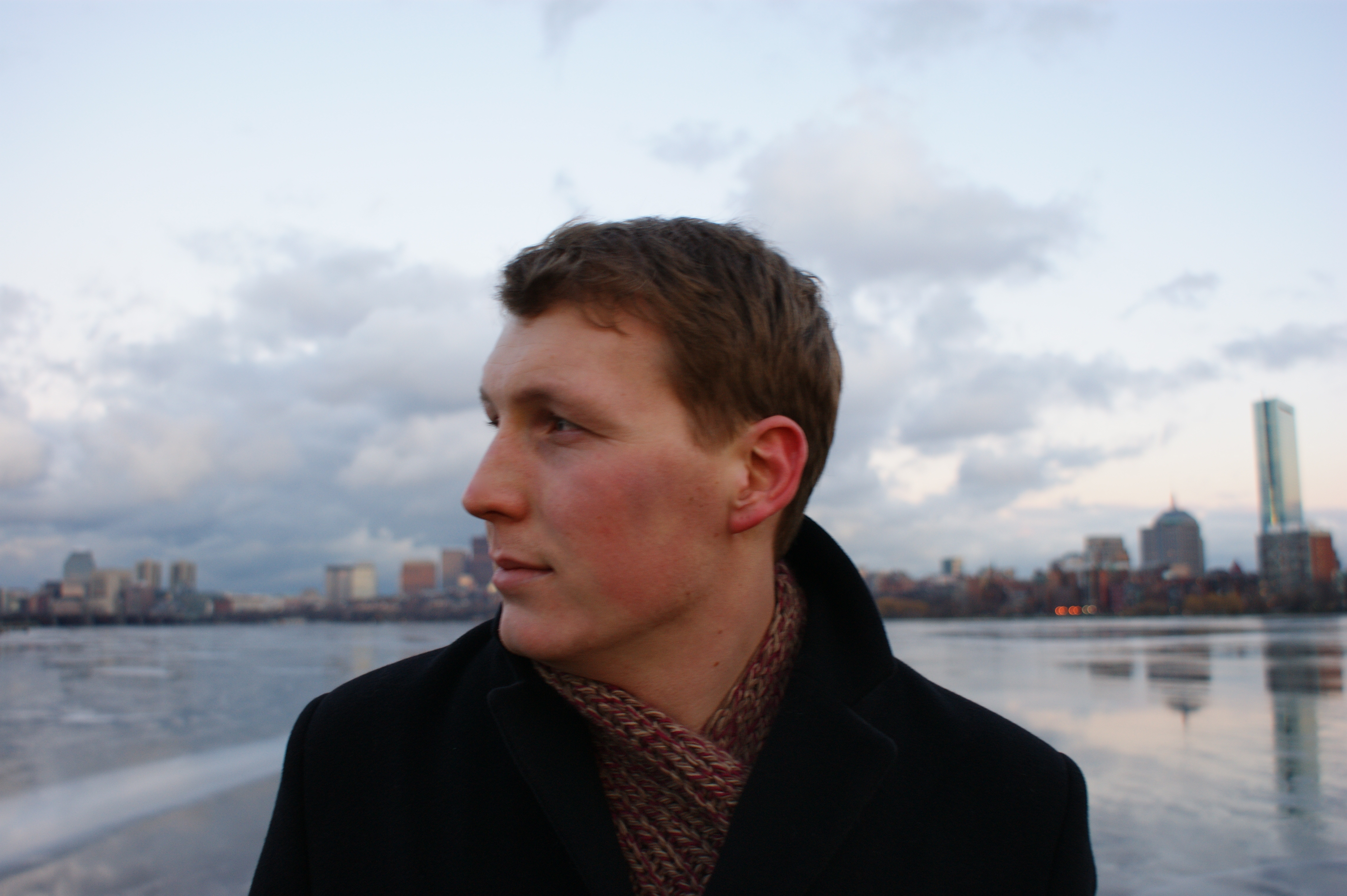
- Schlegel in 2009
- Born: Robert Aleksandrovich Schlegel; December 17, 1984 (age 41); Ashgabat, Turkmen SSR, Soviet Union (now Turkmenistan)
- Citizenship: Russia; Germany (2019–present)
- Education: Moscow Humanitarian Institute of Television and Radio Broadcasting
- Occupation: Politician
- Office: Member of the State Duma (5th and 6th convocations)
- Political party: United Russia (until 2016)

Robert Aleksandrovich Schlegel (Russian: Роберт Александрович Шлегель; born 17 December 1984 in Ashkhabad, Turkmen SSR) is a former United Russia politician who sat in the State Duma from 2007 to 2016, emerging from the pro-Kremlin youth movement Nashi to become an advocate of internet and media regulation. After leaving parliament he resettled in Munich, obtained German citizenship, and in 2023 publicly condemned Russia’s invasion of Ukraine.

== Early life and education ==
Russian press identified Schlegel in 2007 as a 21-year-old former Nashi press-secretary who declared almost no assets when he entered United Russia’s federal list. His formative political experience inside Nashi’s media department later shaped his focus on information policy.

== Political career ==
Schlegel was elected to the 5th State Duma in 2007 and re-elected in 2011, sitting on the Committee on Information Policy, Information Technologies and Communications and chairing its expert council on e-parliament initiatives. He defended a sexually suggestive United Russia video during the 2011 campaign, stating that “youth understand such ads.”

In 2012 he dismissed anti-corruption activist Alexei Navalny as “totally without substance.”

Schlegel co-authored bills such as the 2012 ban on U.S. adoptions of Russian orphans and early drafts criminalising “fake news,” and promoted the so-called “Google tax” on foreign IT firms. The following year he supported offering asylum to Edward Snowden.

In 2016 he criticised Ramzan Kadyrov for invoking Stalin-era rhetoric against domestic opponents.

== Emigration ==
Deciding not to run in 2016, Schlegel moved with his family to Munich through Germany’s ethnic-German resettlement programme. A Süddeutsche Zeitung investigation reported that he was briefly hired by the Swiss cybersecurity firm Acronis before concerns about his political past led to suspension. In an interview with Meduza he cited family ties to Volga Germans and a wish for his children “to be representatives of two cultures.”

== Political views ==
While in office Schlegel backed nationalist, conservative measures, including restrictions on foreign NGOs and praise for cyber-attacks on Estonia. After relocating he expressed regret for past votes and, in 2023, labelled Russia’s full-scale invasion of Ukraine “a war that no one but Vladimir Putin needed.”
