= Mikhail Banshchikov =

Russian politician (1949–2024)

- Михаил Банщиков

Member of the State Duma
- In office 2 December 2007 – 4 December 2011

Personal details
- Born: Mikhail Konstantinovich Banshchikov; 20 March 1949 Vologda, Russian SFSR, USSR
- Died: 4 May 2024 (aged 75)
- Party: United Russia
- Education: Northwestern State Technical Remote University
- Occupation: Engineer

Mikhail Konstantinovich Banshchikov (Russian: Михаи́л Константи́нович Ба́нщиков; 20 March 1949 – 4 May 2024) was a Russian engineer and politician. A member of United Russia, he served in the State Duma from 2007 to 2011.

== Biography ==
He graduated from Secondary School No. 1 in the city of Vologda. In 1973, he completed his studies at the Faculty of Automation and Integrated Mechanization of Mechanical Engineering at the North-Western Polytechnic Institute. For 34 years, he worked at the Chief Design Bureau for Woodworking Equipment Design (GKBD), where he rose through the ranks from design technician to director. He was repeatedly elected as a deputy of the Vologda City Council of People's Deputies and the City Duma.

He was married and had a daughter and a grandson. In 2007, according to the Vologda newspaper Premier and the Vologda city prosecutor's office, he divorced in order to qualify for a housing subsidy for a 63-square-meter apartment in Vologda.

On March 25, 2010, he was involved in a car accident in the central district of Pskov and was hospitalized. However, he recovered quickly and returned to active legislative work by the summer.

He was the chairman of the Orienteering Federation of the Vologda Region and a member of the commission of the International Orienteering Federation, as well as deputy chairman of the Biathlon Sports Federation of the Vologda Region. In his youth, he participated in the amateur theater Rayok, then known as the People’s Youth Theater.

He died on May 4, 2024, in a car accident in the Vologda District. On the Kubenskoye–Severnaya Ferma highway, his car went off the road into a ditch and overturned.
