= Mikhail Starshinov =

Russian politician

- Михаил Старшинов
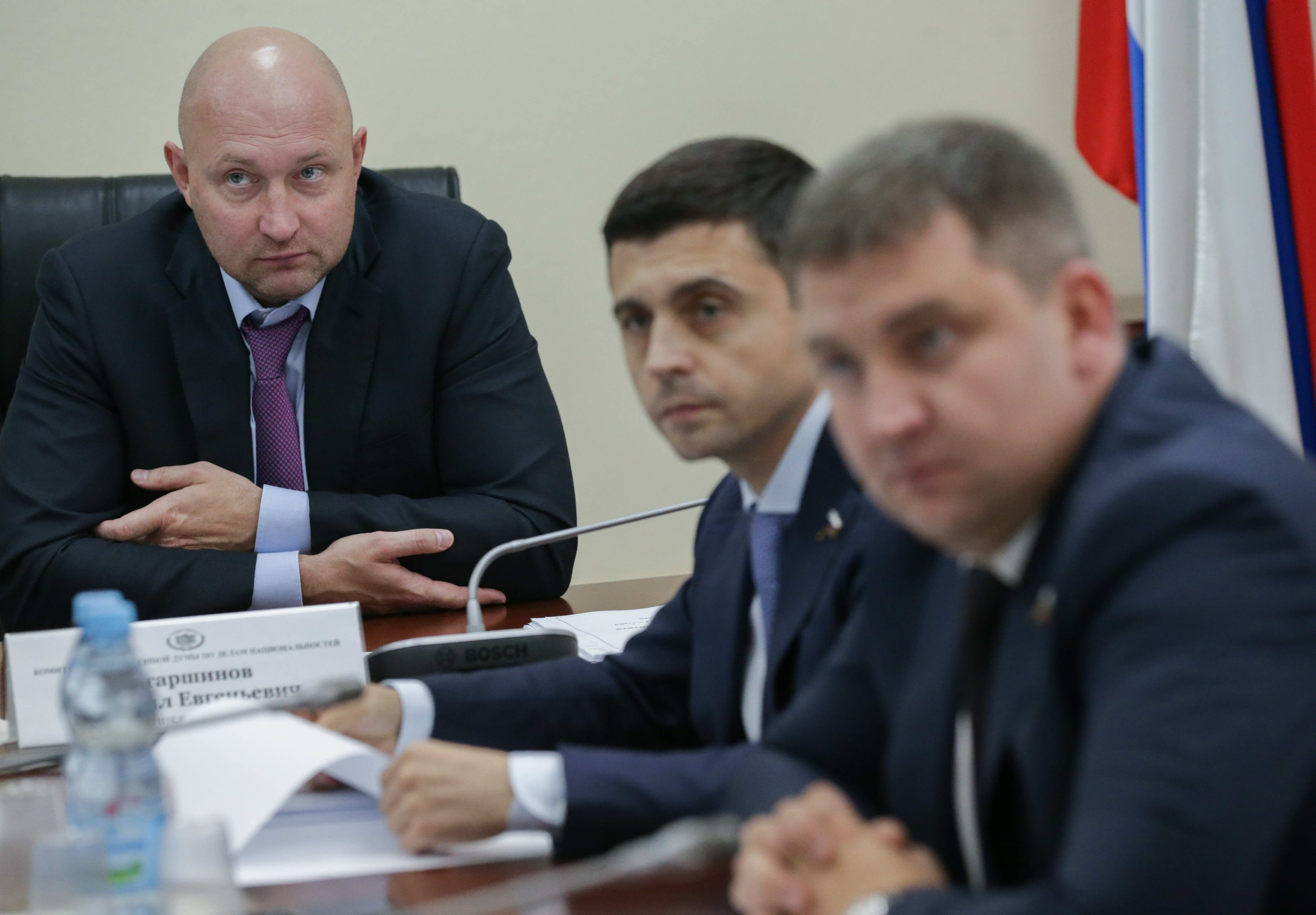

Deputy of the 8th State Duma
- Incumbent
- Assumed office 19 September 2021

Deputy of the 7th State Duma
- In office 5 October 2016 – 12 October 2021

Deputy of the 6th State Duma
- In office 21 December 2011 – 5 October 2016

Deputy of the 5th State Duma
- In office 24 December 2007 – 21 December 2011

Personal details
- Born: 12 December 1971 (age 54) Moscow, Russian Soviet Federative Socialist Republic, USSR
- Party: United Russia
- Education: Ural State University of Physical Culture

Mikhail Starshinov (Russian: Михаил Евгеньевич Старшинов, born 12 December 1971 in Moscow) is a Russian political figure, deputy of the 5th, 6th, 7th, and 8th State Dumas.

At the beginning of the 2000s, Starshinov engaged in entrepreneurial activities in Moscow and the Moscow Oblast; he owned and co-founded several large private enterprises. In 2005, he was appointed Vice-President of the Russian Coal CJSC. In 2006, Starshinov was the Deputy General Director of Elektrostal. In 2006, he started his political career in the Rodina party. The same year, he was elected a member of its central council, chairman of the council of the regional branch of the A Just Russia — For Truth party in the Smolensk Oblast. From 2007 to 2011, he was a member of the 5th State Duma. In 2011, he became a member of the All-Russia People's Front. In August 2011, he was excluded from the A Just Russia — For Truth party. In 2011-2016, Starshinov was the deputy of the 6th State Duma. In 2016 and 2021, he was re-elected for the 7th and 8th State Dumas, respectively.

On 24 March 2022, the United States Treasury sanctioned him in response to the 2022 Russian invasion of Ukraine.
