= Dmitry Vyatkin =

Russian politician

Dmitry Vyatkin MP
- Дмитрий Вяткин
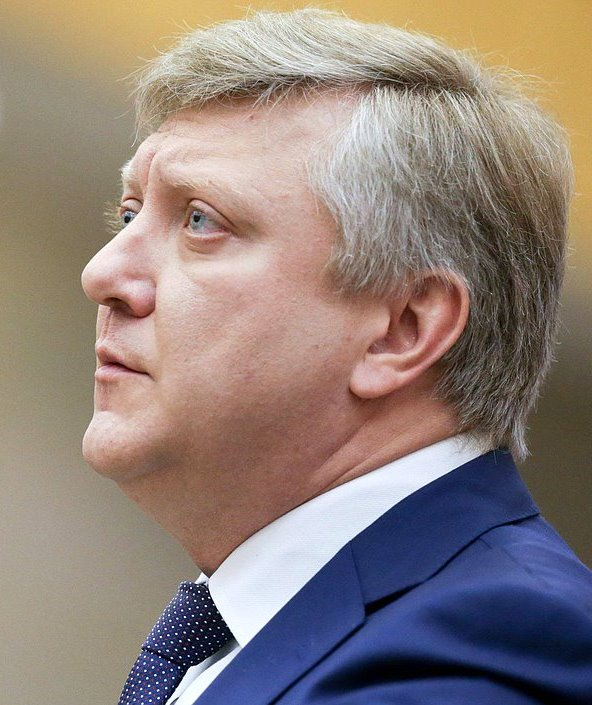
- Vyatkin in 2018

Member of the State Duma (Party List Seat)
- Incumbent
- Assumed office 24 December 2011

Personal details
- Born: 21 May 1974 (age 52) Korkino, Chelyabinsk Oblast, Russian SFSR, USSR
- Party: United Russia
- Education: Chelyabinsk State University

Dmitry Fedorovich Vyatkin (Russian: Дмитрий Фёдорович Вяткин; born 21 May 1974) is a Russian political figure and a deputy of the 5th, 6th, 7th, and 8th State Dumas. In 2005, he was granted a Candidate of Sciences in Juridical Science degree.

After graduating from the Chelyabinsk State University, Vyatkin started working at the PJSC Chelindbank; from 1997 to 2005, he also headed the Legal Department. In 1999, he became the consultant on legal issues for the politician Mikhail Grishankov. From 2000 to 2007, he was the deputy of the Legislative Assembly of Chelyabinsk Oblast of the 3rd and 4th convocations. In December 2002, Vyatkin joined the United Russia. In 2007, he was elected deputy of the 5th State Duma from the Chelyabinsk Oblast constituency. In 2011, 2016, and 2021, he was re-elected for the 6th, 7th, and 8th State Dumas.

Vyatkin authored a number of restrictive bills, including the one on the prohibition of foreign funding of public events, criminal liability for defamation on the Internet, toughening administrative responsibility for the disclosure of official and professional secrets. He also supported the implementation of the Dima Yakovlev Law.

Russian citizens critical of the 2022 Russian mobilization have used social media and other electronic means (e.g. Twitter) to enquire en masse Russia's top officials and deputies, who supported war with Ukraine and mobilization, whether they themselves or their sons would go to the front. Most of them refused to answer or made excuses. Vyatkin said in a speech that deputies should not give up their mandate and go to fight at the front, because they have the duty and responsibility to take care of the citizens of Russia and solve their problems.

== Sanctions ==
He was sanctioned by the UK government in 2022 in relation to the Russo-Ukrainian War.
