= Alexander Furman =

Israeli-American mathematician

- אלכסנדר פורמן
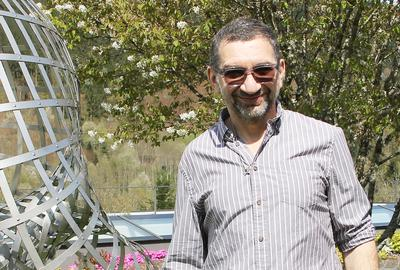
- Furman at Oberwolfach in 2026
- Education: Hebrew University of Jerusalem
- Known for: Dynamical systems, Ergodic theory, Lie groups
- Awards: Simons Foundation Fellow (2014), NSF CAREER Award, AMS Fellow (2016), UIC University Scholar Award, LAS Distinguished Professor Award
- Scientific career
- Fields: Mathematics
- Workplaces: University of Illinois Chicago

Alexander Furman (Hebrew: אלכסנדר פורמן) is a mathematician at the University of Illinois, Chicago. Furman received his bachelor's degree in mathematics and computer science from the Hebrew University of Jerusalem in 1986, later earning his master's degree and PhD in mathematics in 1989 and 1996, respectively, from the same university.

== Career ==
Furman started teaching mathematics in 1996 as an L. E. Dickson Instructor of Mathematics at the University of Chicago. In 1997, he received a position as a postdoctoral fellow at Penn State University. He has worked at the University of Illinois Chicago since 1997, serving as an assistant professor from 1999 until 2007 and beginning as a full-time professor in 2007. Furman also runs the UIC Math Olympiad Project where he works with high school-age students, discussing and working out mathematical problems.

== Honors and awards ==
Furman has been awarded multiple National Science Foundation and Binational Science Foundation grants. In 2014, Furman was made a Simons Foundation Fellow in Mathematics and was awarded the National Science Foundation CAREER award for his work in teaching through research. The same year, he was an invited speaker for the International Congress of Mathematics hosted in Seoul. For his work in dynamical systems, ergodic theory, and Lie groups, he was made an American Mathematical Society Fellow in 2016. He has additionally received UIC's University Scholar Award, as well as the LAS Distinguished Professor Award.
