= Arkady Sarkisyan =

Russian politician (born 1959)

- Аркадий Саркисян
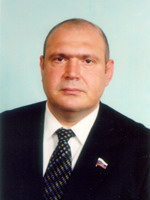

Senator from Khakassia
- In office April 2001 – June 2006
- Succeeded by: Evgeny Serebrennikov

Personal details
- Born: Arkady Sarkisyan; 23 February 1959 (age 67) Sevastopol, Ukrainian Soviet Socialist Republic, Soviet Union
- Party: Liberal Democratic Party of Russia
- Education: Nakhimov Higher Naval School (Sevastopol)

Arkady Rafikovich Sarkisyan (Russian: Аркадий Рафикович Саркисян; born 23 February 1959) is a Russian politician who served as a senator from Khakassia from 2001 to 2006.

== Career ==
Arkady Sarkisyan was born on 23 February 1959 in Sevastopol, Ukrainian Soviet Socialist Republic. He graduated from the Nakhimov Higher Naval School in Sevastopol and Khakassian State University. From 1976 to 1994, he served in the Russian Navy. In 1997, he became the first deputy head of the Government of the Republic of Khakassia. In 2000, he was appointed vice-president of the Siberian Aluminum Group LLC, which manages the shares of the Krasnoyarsk, Sayan and Bratsk aluminum smelters. In 2001, he was appointed senator from Khakassia. His powers were terminated in 2006. Sarkisyan is known to be a long-term ally of a Russian billionaire Oleg Deripaska. In 2018, Deripaska passed to Sarkisyan the shares of his JSK Glavstroy business.
