= Viktor Antonov (politician) =

Russian politician (born 1951)

Viktor Antonov (born 1951) is a Russian politician and member of the State Duma.
