= Vasily Tarasyuk =

Russian politician

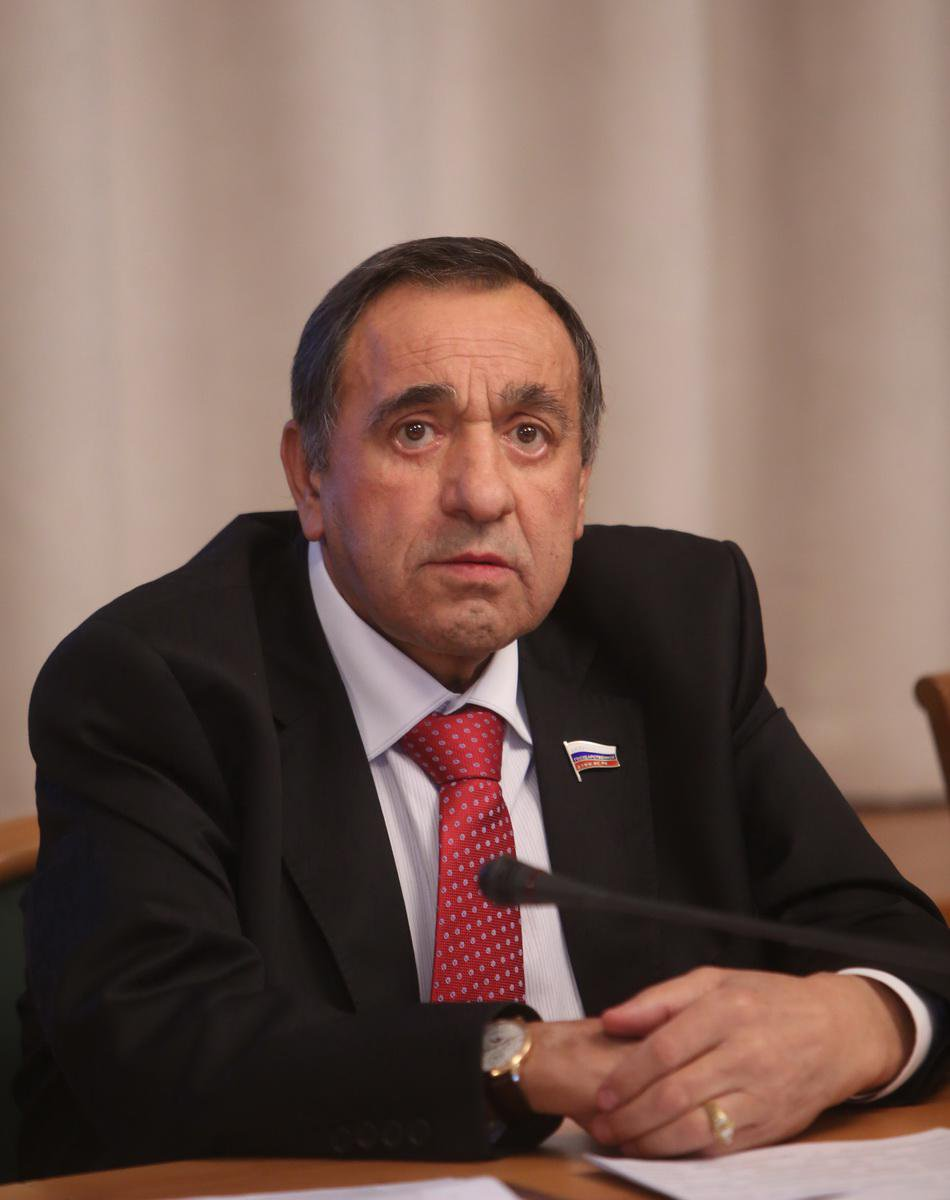
Vasily Tarasyuk

Vasily Mikhailovich Tarasyuk (Russian: Василий Михайлович Тарасюк, also transliterated as Vasily Mikhailovich Tarasuk; October 10, 1948 – May 6, 2017) was a member of the State Duma of Russia. He was a member of the LDPR, and was Deputy Chairman of the State Duma's Committee on Natural Resources and Utilization. He previously served as chairman of a petroleum company. He drowned in the Dead Sea while on vacation in Israel.

== Biography ==
Nikolay Ashlapov was born on October 10, 1948, in the village of Lomachyntsi, Chernivtsi Region (Ukraine).

In 1974, he graduated from the Kyiv Institute of Trade and Economics.

In 1991, he graduated from the Ufa Petroleum Institute.

In 2012, he completed his studies at the Russian Presidential Academy of National Economy and Public Administration.

Since 1974, he held managerial positions in trade enterprises, within the structure of the Ministry of Trade and the Ministry of Fisheries of the Ukrainian SSR.

In 1984, he served as Head of the Labor Supply Department at the Povkhneft Oil and Gas Production Directorate (NGDU) in the city of Kogalym.

From 1988 to 1993, he held the position of Deputy Head for Social Affairs at the Vatyeganneft NGDU.

In 1993, he became Deputy General Director of the Joint-Stock Company "LUKOIL – Kogalymneftegaz."

In 1995, he served as Deputy General Director for Human Resources and Social Development at LUKOIL – Western Siberia LLC.

In 2000, he was Deputy General Director of LUKOIL – Western Siberia LLC.

In 2003, he served as General Director of Afipsky Refinery LLC (Rosneft-Krasnodarnefteorgsintez).
