= 6th State Duma =

Convocation of the lower house of Russian parliament

State Duma of the Federal Assembly of the Russian Federation of the 6th convocation
←	5th State Duma	7th State Duma	→
- Seat composition of the 6th State Duma

Overview
- Meeting place: State Duma building Moscow, Okhotny Ryad street, 1
- Term: 21 December 2011 – 5 October 2016
- Election: 4 December 2011
- Government: Putin Second Government; Medvedev First Cabinet
- Website: State Duma
- Members: 450 / 450
- Chairman: Sergey Naryshkin (from United Russia)
- First Deputy: Alexander Zhukov (from United Russia); Ivan Melnikov (from Communist Party)
- Deputy: List: Sergey Neverov (from United Russia) Andrey Vorobyov (from United Russia) Lyudmila Shvetsova (from United Russia) Oleg Morozov (from United Russia) Nikolai Levichev (from A Just Russia) Alexander Romanovich (from A Just Russia) Igor Lebedev (from Liberal Democratic Party)
- Party control: United Russia

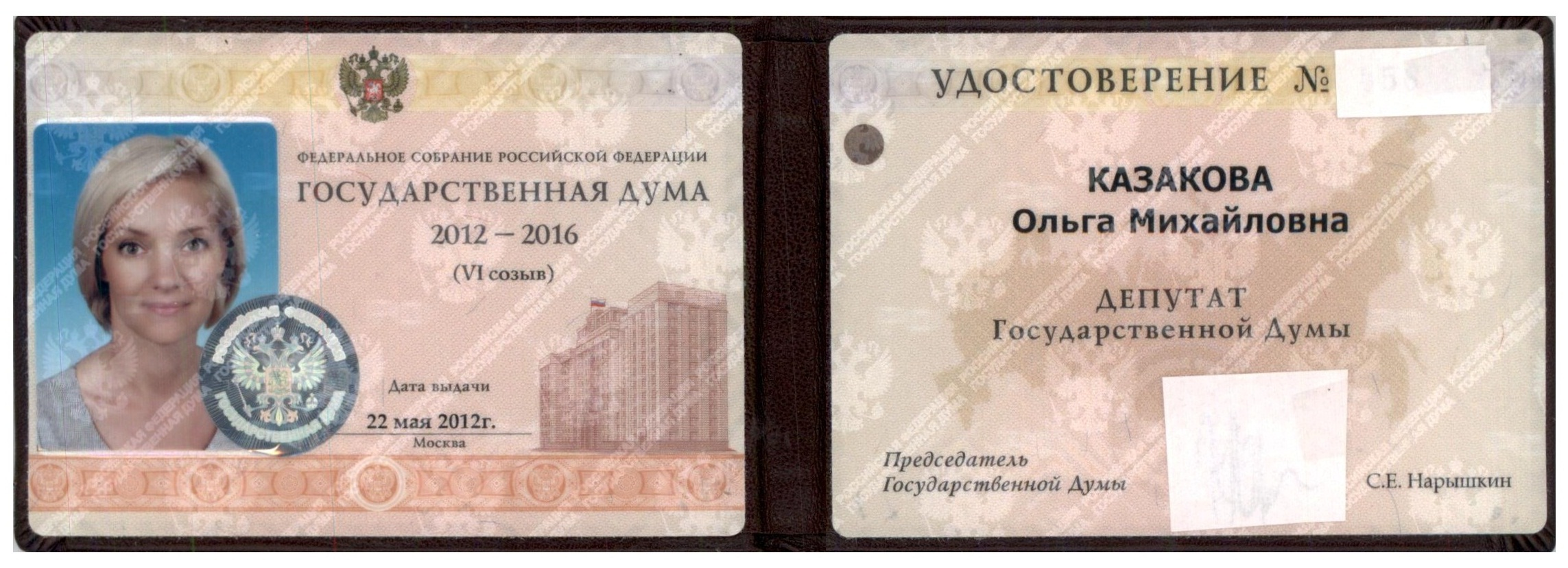
Identity card of a Deputy of the State Duma of the 6th convocation

Location of parliamentary factions in the 6th State Duma: – United Russia (238) – Communist Party (92) / – A Just Russia (64) – Liberal Democratic Party (56)

The State Duma of the Federal Assembly of the Russian Federation of the 6th convocation (Russian: Государственная Дума Федерального Собрания Российской Федерации VI созыва) is a former convocation of the legislative branch of the State Duma, Lower House of the Russian Parliament. The 6th convocation meets at the State Duma building in Moscow, having begun its term on December 21, 2011 following the last session of the 5th State Duma. The term of office expired October 5, 2016, when the next parliamentary elections.

The 6th State Duma's composition was based upon the results of the 2011 parliamentary election. Of the seven parties participating in the elections, only four were able to overcome the 7% election threshold to gain representation based upon the proportional representation system.

== Leadership ==
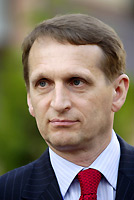
Sergey Naryshkin was Chairman of the 6th State Duma

On December 21, 2011, the parliament elected Sergey Naryshkin from the United Russia as the Chairman of the State Duma.

At the same time, according to tradition, until the election of the chairman of the State Duma, the meeting carried the oldest members of the State Duma – 87-year-old Vladimir Dolgikh (from United Russia) and 81-year-old Zhores Alferov (from Communist Party).

Office	MP	Period	Parliamentary affiliation
Chairman	Sergey Naryshkin	December 21, 2011 — October 5, 2016	United Russia
First Deputy Chairman	Alexander Zhukov	December 21, 2011 — October 5, 2016	United Russia
First Deputy Chairman	Ivan Melnikov	December 21, 2011 — October 5, 2016	Communist Party
Deputy Chairman	Sergey Neverov	December 21, 2011 — October 5, 2016	United Russia
Deputy Chairman	Andrey Vorobyov	December 21, 2011 — November 10, 2012	United Russia
Deputy Chairman	Oleg Morozov	December 21, 2011 — May 25, 2012	United Russia
Deputy Chairman	Lyudmila Shvetsova	December 21, 2011 — October 29, 2014	United Russia
Deputy Chairman	Igor Lebedev	December 21, 2011 — October 5, 2016	Liberal Democratic Party
Deputy Chairman	Nikolai Levichev	December 21, 2011 — March 25, 2016	A Just Russia
Deputy Chairman	Alexander Romanovich	March 25, 2016 — October 5, 2016	A Just Russia
Faction leaders	Andrey Vorobyov	December 21, 2011 — November 10, 2012	United Russia
Faction leaders	Vladimir Vasilyev	November 10, 2012 — October 5, 2016	United Russia
Faction leaders	Gennady Zyuganov	December 21, 2011 — October 5, 2016	Communist Party
Faction leaders	Vladimir Zhirinovsky	December 21, 2011 — October 5, 2016	Liberal Democratic Party
Faction leaders	Sergey Mironov	December 21, 2011 — October 5, 2016	A Just Russia

== Factions ==
Faction	Seats
United Russia	238
Communist Party of the Russian Federation	92
A Just Russia	64
Liberal Democratic Party of Russia	56

== Committees ==
On December 21, 2011, the State Duma approved the composition of its 27 committees.

Committees	Leader	Party
On Constitutional Legislation and State Building	Vladimir Pligin	United Russia
On Civil, Criminal, Arbitration and Procedural Legislation	Pavel Krasheninnikov	United Russia
On Labour, Social Policy and Veterans' Affairs	Andrey Isaev	United Russia
On Budget and Tax	Andrey Makarov	United Russia
On Financial Market	Natalia Burykina	United Russia
On Economic Policy, Innovative Development and Entrepreneurship	Igor Rudensky	United Russia
On Property Issues	Sergey Gavrilov	Communist Party
On Industry	Sergei Sobko	Communist Party
On Land relations and Construction	Aleksey Russkikh	Communist Party
On Science and High Relations	Valery Chernyshev	A Just Russia
On Energy	Ivan Grachov	A Just Russia
On Transport	Eugene Moskvichev	United Russia
On Defence	Vladimir Komoedov	Communist Party
On Safety and Anti-Corruption	Irina Yarovaya	United Russia
On International Affairs	Aleksey Pushkov	United Russia
On CIS Affairs and Relations with Compatriots	Leonid Slutsky	Liberal Democratic Party
On the Federal Structure and Local Government	Victor Kidyaev	United Russia
On Regional Policy and the problems of the North and the Far East	Nikolay Kharitonov	Communist Party
On Agrarian Issues	Nikolay Pankov	United Russia
On Natural Resources, Environment and Ecology	Vladimir Kashin	Communist Party
On Education	Vyacheslav Nikonov	United Russia
For Nationalities	Gadzhimet Safaraliev	United Russia
On Physical Culture, Sport and Youth Affairs	Igor Ananskikh	Liberal Democratic Party
On Housing Policy and Housing and Communal Services	Galina Khovanskaya	A Just Russia
On Rules and Organization of the State Duma	Sergei Popov	United Russia
On Public Associations and Religious Organizations	Yaroslav Nilov	Liberal Democratic Party
On Women, Family and Children	Yelena Mizulina	A Just Russia

== Major legislation ==
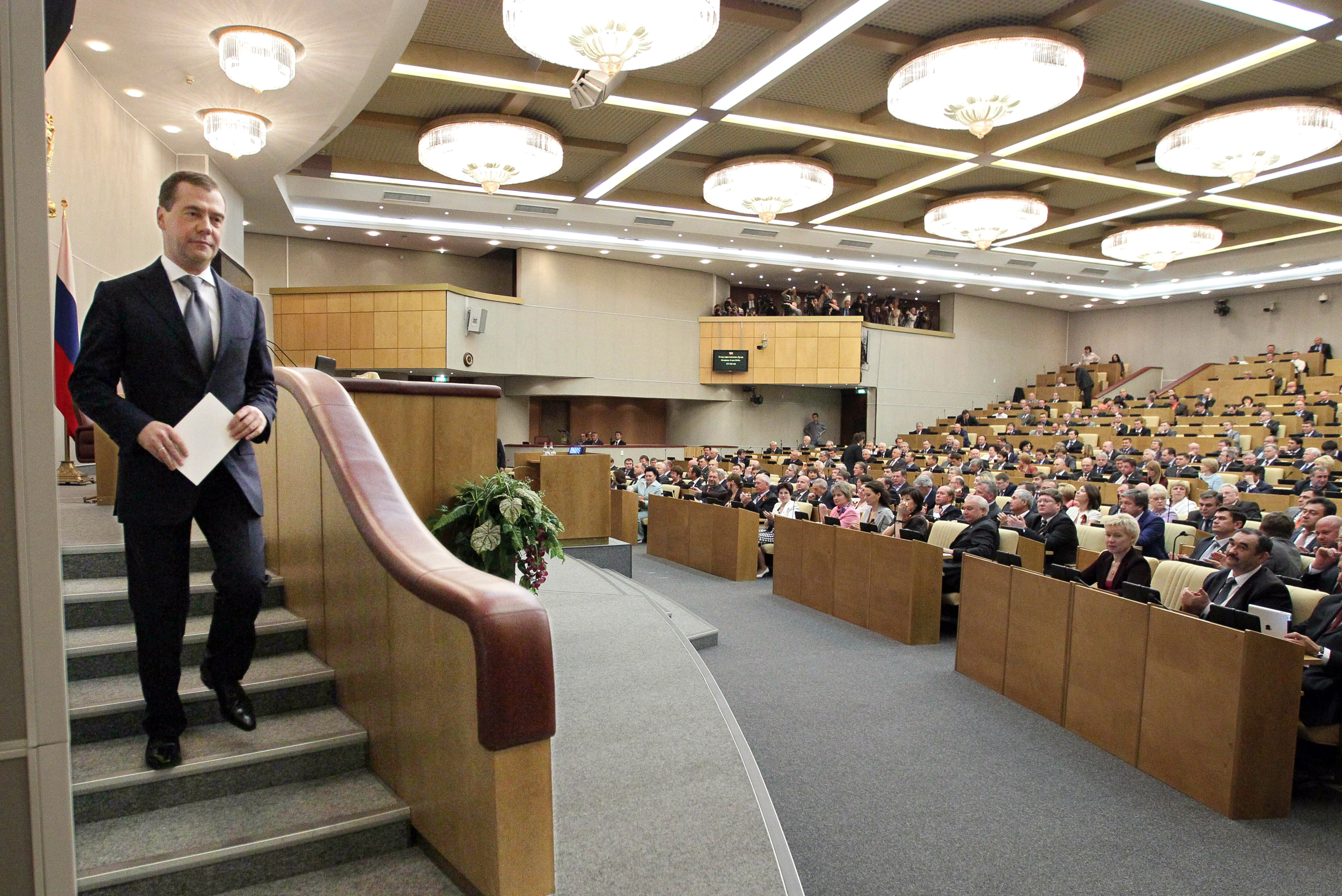
Dmitry Medvedev during his appointment as Prime Minister

Some media have criticized the 6th Duma for adopting legislation which was not properly discussed, voted too quickly without consulting experts, and which may contradict the Constitution.

- May 8, 2012: Dmitry Medvedev approved as Prime Minister of Russia with 299 votes in favor.
- December 21, 2012: "Dima Yakovlev Law" with 420 votes in favor.
- March 20, 2014: Ratification of the Federal Law "On joining of Crimea to the Russian Federation" with 443 votes in favor.
- March 20, 2014: Federal constitutional law "On the adoption of the Russian Federation, the Republic of Crimea and the formation within the Russian Federation of new entities - the Republic of Crimea and the federal city of Sevastopol" with 444 votes in favor.
- July 3, 2015: Moving forward the 2016 State Duma elections by three months, with 339 votes in favor.
- June 24, 2016: The "Yarovaya law", with 287 votes in favor.

== List of deputies ==
List of deputies

Name	Born	Party	Mandate	Regional group	Period	Prior to the election
Irina Yarovaya	1966	United Russia	assumed the mandate of Dmitry Medvedev (President of Russia) through Vladimir Ilyukhin (Governor of Kamchatka Krai)	24 — Kamchatka Krai (№ 2)		member of 5th State Duma
Alyona Arshinova	1985	United Russia	assumed the mandate of Konstantin Kosachev	60 — Penza Oblast (№ 5)	Since 04.04.2012	Co-Chairman of the Coordination Council of the Young Guard of United Russia
Zaur Askenderov	1970	United Russia	assumed the mandate	5 — Dagestan (№ 13)	since 21.03.2012	In 2008, he headed the International Transnational Investment Company Alvisagroup (together with his brother, Kamil Askenderov).
Timur Akulov	1953	United Russia	assumed the mandate of Oleg Morozov	16 — Tatarstan (№ 16)	since 29.06.2012	Assistant to the president of the Republic of Tatarstan
Valery Ivanov	1960	United Russia	assumed the mandate of Tatiana Yakovleva	40 — Ivanovo Oblast (№ 3)	since 19.07.2012	Chairman of the Public Chamber of the Ivanovo Region
Olga Kazakova	1968	United Russia	assumed the mandate	29 — Stavropol Krai (№ 6)	since 22.05.2012	Minister of Culture of Stavropol Krai
Olga Timofeeva	1977	United Russia	assumed the mandate	29 — Stavropol Krai (№ 7)	since 22.05.2012	Producer of special projects of the Stavropol commercial broadcasting studio network (Stavropol TV LLC)
Raziyot Natkho	1961	United Russia	assumed the mandate of Murat Kumpilov (prime-minister of Adygea)	1 — Adygea (№ 3)		Minister of Health of Adygeya
Vladimir Potsyapun	1964	United Russia	assumed the mandate of Rustem Khamitov (Head of Bashkortostan)	3 — Bashkortostan (№ 14)		Deputy CEO of the Federal State Unitary Enterprise Enterprise for the Management of Radioactive Waste "RosRAO"
Pavel Krasheninnikov	1964	United Russia	chosen	3 — Bashkortostan (№ 2)		member of 5th State Duma
Zugura Rakhmatullina	1961	United Russia	chosen	3 — Bashkortostan (№ 3)		Deputy Prime Minister of the Republic of Bashkortostan
Pavel Rurikovich Kachkayev	1951	United Russia	chosen	3 — Bashkortostan (№ 4)		Head of administration of Ufa
Marsel Yusupov	1969	United Russia	chosen	3 — Bashkortostan (№ 5)		member of 5th State Duma
Alexander Degtyaryov	1952	United Russia	chosen	3 — Bashkortostan (№ 6)		Member of State Assembly of the Republic of Bashkortostan
Irshat Fakhritdinov	1965	United Russia	chosen	3 — Bashkortostan (№ 8)		member of 5th State Duma
Rima Batalova	1964	United Russia	chosen	3 — Bashkortostan (№ 9)		
Anvar Mahmutov	1955	United Russia	chosen	3 — Bashkortostan (№ 10)		Deputy Prime Minister of the Republic of Bashkortostan
Viktor Klimov	1968	United Russia	chosen	3 — Bashkortostan (№ 11)		Executive Director of Opora Rossii, a public organisation of small and medium-sized enterprises
Saliya Murzabaeva	1957	United Russia	chosen	3 — Bashkortostan (№ 12)		member of 5th State Duma
Rafael Mardanshin	1961	United Russia	chosen	3 — Bashkortostan (№ 13)		businessperson
Mikhail Slipenchuk	1956	United Russia	assumed the mandate of Vyacheslav Nagovitsyn (Head of Buryatia)	4 — Buryatia (№ 2)		
Murad Gadzhiev	1961	United Russia	assumed the mandate of Magomedsalam Magomedov (President of Dagestan)	5 — Dagestan (№ 11)		
Umakhan Umakhanov	1965	United Russia	assumed the mandate	5 — Dagestan (№ 12)		President of the Wushu Sanshou Federation of Russia
Ramazan Abdulatipov	1946	United Russia	chosen	5 — Dagestan (№ 3)		rector of Moscow State Art and Cultural University
Magomed Gadzhiyev	1965	United Russia	chosen	5 — Dagestan (№ 4)		member of 5th State Duma
Khizri Shikhsaidov	1947	United Russia	chosen	5 — Dagestan (№ 5)		member of 5th State Duma, president of soccer club FC Anzhi Makhachkala
Rizvan Kurbanov	1961	United Russia	chosen	5 — Dagestan (№ 6)		First Deputy Chairman of the Government of the Republic of Dagestan
Magomedkadi Hasanov	1962	United Russia	chosen	5 — Dagestan (№ 7)		member of 5th State Duma
Gadzhimet Safaraliyev	1950	United Russia	chosen	5 — Dagestan (№ 8)		member of 5th State Duma
~~Adam Amirilayev~~	1963	United Russia	chosen	5 — Dagestan (№ 9)		member of 5th State Duma
Balash Balashov	1954	United Russia	chosen	5 — Dagestan (№ 10)		CEO of PJSC RAS
Belan Khamchiev	1960	United Russia	assumed the mandate of Yunus-bek Yevkurov ( Head of the Republic of Ingushetia)	6 — Ingushetia (№ 2)		member of 5th State Duma
Yuri Vasiliev	1951	United Russia	assumed the mandate of Arsen Kanokov (Head of Kabardino-Balkaria)	7 — Kabardino-Balkaria (№ 4)		member of 5th State Duma
Adalbi Shkhagoshev	1967	United Russia	chosen	7 — Kabardino-Balkaria (№ 2)		member of 5th State Duma
Zaur Gekkiyev	1961	United Russia	chosen	7 — Kabardino-Balkaria (№ 3)		Deputy CEO for Government Relations and Public Relations; Interregional Distribution Grid Company of the North Caucasus, member of Parliament of the Kabardino-Balkarian Republic
Marina Mukabenova	1982	United Russia	assumed the mandate of Aleksey Orlov (Head of Kalmykia)	8 — Kalmykia (№ 2)		member of 5th State Duma
Akhmat Erkenov	1951	United Russia	assumed the mandate of Rashid Temrezov (Head of Karachay-Cherkessia)	9 — Karachay-Cherkessia (№ 3)		member of 5th State Duma
Mikhail Starshinov	1971	United Russia	chosen	9 — Karachay-Cherkessia (№ 2)		member of 5th State Duma
Valentina Pivnenko	1947	United Russia	chosen	10 — Republic of Karelia (№ 1)		member of 5th State Duma
Vladimir Ponevezhsky	1951	United Russia	assumed the mandate of Vyacheslav Gayzer (Head of Komi Republic)	11 — Komi Republic (№ 3)		prosecutor of Komi Republic
Tamara Kuzminykh	1937	United Russia	chosen	11 — Komi Republic (№ 2)		pensioner
Vladimir Shemyakin	1969	United Russia	assumed the mandate of Leonid Markelov (Head of Mari El)	12 — Mari El (№ 2)		CEO of ZAO Video International Trend
~~Vyacheslav Osipov~~	1937	United Russia	chosen	13 — Mordovia (№ 2)	15.12.2011—19.12.2012 died, mandate assumed	member of 5th State Duma
Vitaly Efimov	1940	United Russia	chosen	13 — Mordovia (№ 3)		President of the Union of Transport Workers of Russia, an association of legal entities
Nadezhda Shkolkina	1970	United Russia	chosen	13 — Mordovia (№ 4)		member of 5th State Duma
Mikhail Nikolayev	1937	United Russia	assumed the mandate of Yegor Borisov (President of Sakha Republic) through Vyacheslav Shtyrov (Deputy Chairman of the Federation Council)	14 — Sakha Republic (№ 3)		State Counselor of the Republic of Sakha (Yakutia) in the administration of the president and government of the republic
Tamerlan Aguzarov	1963	United Russia	assumed the mandate of Taymuraz Mamsurov (Head of North Ossetia–Alania)	15 — North Ossetia–Alania (№ 3)		Chairman of the Supreme Court of the Republic of North Ossetia-Alania
Makharbek Khadartsev	1964	United Russia	chosen	15 — North Ossetia–Alania (№ 2)		CEO of the Vladikavkaz beer and alcoholic beverage plant Daryal, member of the Parliament of the Republic of North Ossetia-Alania
Airat Khairullin	1970	United Russia	assumed the mandate of Rustam Minnikhanov (President of Tatarstan)	16 — Tatarstan (№ 14)		member of 5th State Duma
Fatikh Sibagatullin	1950	United Russia	assumed the mandate of Farid Mukhametshin (Chairman of State Council of the Republic of Tatarstan)	16 — Tatarstan (№ 15)		member of 5th State Duma
~~Oleg Morozov~~	1953	United Russia	chosen	16 — Tatarstan (№ 3)		member of 5th State Duma, first deputy chairman
Alina Kabaeva	1983	United Russia	chosen	16 — Tatarstan (№ 4)		member of 5th State Duma
Ildar Gilmutdinov	1962	United Russia	chosen	16 — Tatarstan (№ 5)		member of 5th State Duma
Alfiya Kogogina	1968	United Russia	chosen	16 — Tatarstan (№ 6)		Director for Leasing and Sales Development, OJSC Kamaz — director of financial services development
Irek Boguslavsky	1967	United Russia	chosen	16 — Tatarstan (№ 7)		member and first deputy chairman of 5th State Duma
Marat Bariev	1961	United Russia	chosen	16 — Tatarstan (№ 8)		Executive Director and Secretary General; Russian Olympic Committee
Radik Ilyasov	1951	United Russia	chosen	16 — Tatarstan (№ 9)		Executive Director - General Director of JSC Nizhnekamskshina (is a part of MC Tatneft-Neftekhim, a subsidiary of the JSC Tatneft), member of State Council of the Republic of Tatarstan
Rinat Khayrov	1964	United Russia	chosen	16 — Tatarstan (№ 10)		First Deputy General Director of OJSC Radioelectronic Technologies Concern
Alexander Sidyakin	1977	United Russia	chosen	16 — Tatarstan (№ 11)		secretary of Federation of Independent Trade Unions of Russia, Head of the Collective Action Department and the development of the trade union movement
Rishat Abubakirov	1959	United Russia	chosen	16 — Tatarstan (№ 12)		Head of Almetyevsky District, Head of Almetyevsk, member of Almetyevsk City Council
Marcel Galimardanov	1951	United Russia	chosen	16 — Tatarstan (№ 13)		Chief Federal Inspector for the Republic of Tatarstan of the Office of the Presidential Envoy of the Russian Federation in the Volga Federal District Grigory Rapota
Larisa Shoigu	1953	United Russia	assumed the mandate of Sholban Kara-ool (government chairman Tuva)	17 — Tuva (№ 2)		member of 5th State Duma
Nikolay Abroskin	1951	United Russia	assumed the mandate of Alexander Volkov (President of Udmurtia)	18 — Udmurtia (№ 3)		counselor of Minister of Defence (Russia) Anatoly Serdyukov
Bekkhan Agayev	1975	United Russia	assumed the mandate of Nikolay Musalimov (member of 5th State Duma)	18 — Udmurtia (№ 4)		Vice President of LLC Yug-Nefteprodukt
Nadezhda Maximova	1942	United Russia	assumed the mandate of Viktor Zimin (Head and Prime Minister of Khakassia)	19 — Khakassia (№ 2)		member of 5th State Duma
Khozh-Magomed Vakhaev	1949	United Russia	assumed the mandate of Ramzan Kadyrov (Head of Chechnya)	20 — Chechnya (№ 5)		member of 5th State Duma
Magomed Selimkhanov	1976	United Russia	assumed the mandate of Odes Baysultanov (government chairman of Chechnya)	20 — Chechnya (№ 6)		Deputy Chairman of the Government of Chechnya — Head of the Administration of the Head and Government of Chechnya
Shamsail Saraliev	1973	United Russia	assumed the mandate of Dukuvakha Abdurakhmanov (chairman of Parliament of the Chechen Republic)	20 — Chechnya (№ 7)		Minister of Foreign Relations of Chechnya, national policy, press and information
Adam Delimkhanov	1969	United Russia	chosen	20 — Chechnya (№ 4)		member of 5th State Duma
Ruslan Tikhonov	1955	United Russia	assumed the mandate of Mikhail Ignatyev (President of Chuvashia) through Alla Samoilova (Chief physician of the Presidential Perinatal Center State Institution of Health Care)	21 — Chuvashia (№ 4)		Chief Federal Inspector for the Republic of Tatarstan of the Office of the Presidential Envoy of the Russian Federation in the Volga Federal District Grigory Rapota
~~Konstantin Kosachev~~	1962	United Russia	chosen	21 — Chuvashia (№ 2)		member of 5th State Duma
Nikolai Gerasimenko	1950	United Russia	assumed the mandate of Alexander Karlin (Governor of Altai Krai)	22 — Altai Krai (№ 4)		member of 5th State Duma
Sergey Neverov	1961	United Russia	chosen	22 — Altai Krai (№ 2)		member of 5th State Duma
Alexander Prokopyev	1986	United Russia	chosen	22 — Altai Krai (№ 3)		Director for Strategic Development of CJSC Evalar
Joseph Kobzon	1937	United Russia	assumed the mandate of Stepan Zhiryakov (chairman of Legislative Assembly of Zabaykalsky Krai)	23 — Zabaykalsky Krai (№ 2)		member of 5th State Duma
Alexander Remezkov	1962	United Russia	assumed the mandate of Alexander Tkachov (Governor of Krasnodar Krai)	25 — Krasnodar Krai (№ 12)		Chairman of the Board of Directors of Black Sea Finance Company LLC
Vasily Tolstopiatov	1973	United Russia	assumed the mandate of Vladimir Beketov (chairman of Legislative Assembly of Krasnodar Krai)	25 — Krasnodar Krai (№ 13)		member of 5th State Duma
Nikolai Gorovoy	1937	United Russia	chosen	25 — Krasnodar Krai (№ 3)		pensioner
Gleb Khor	1963	United Russia	chosen	25 — Krasnodar Krai (№ 4)		member of 5th State Duma
Ivan Demchenko	1960	United Russia	chosen	25 — Krasnodar Krai (№ 5)		member of 5th State Duma
Alexey Tkachov	1957	United Russia	chosen	25 — Krasnodar Krai (№ 6)		member of 5th State Duma
Robert Schlegel	1984	United Russia	chosen	25 — Krasnodar Krai (№ 7)		member of 5th State Duma
Sergey Krivonosov	1971	United Russia	chosen	25 — Krasnodar Krai (№ 8)		Director of LLC Eighth Sky
Alexey Yezubov	1948	United Russia	chosen	25 — Krasnodar Krai (№ 9)		member of 5th State Duma
Aleksandr Skorobogatko	1967	United Russia	chosen	25 — Krasnodar Krai (№ 10)		member of 5th State Duma
Valeriy Kravchenko	1947	United Russia	chosen	25 — Krasnodar Krai (№ 11)		member of 5th State Duma
Raisa Karmazina	1951	United Russia	assumed the mandate of Sergei Shoigu (Minister of the Russian Federation for Civil Defense, emergency situations and liquidation of consequences of natural disasters)	26 — Krasnoyarsk Krai (№ 4)		member of 5th State Duma
Pyotr Pimashkov	1948	United Russia	chosen	26 — Krasnoyarsk Krai (№ 2)		Head of Krasnoyarsk
~~Andrey Vorobyov~~ fraction leader by November 8, 2012	1970	United Russia	chosen	26 — Krasnoyarsk Krai (№ 3)	—08.11.2012, mandate given to Viktor Zubarev	member of 5th State Duma
Viktor Zubarev	1961	United Russia	assumed the mandate of Andrey Vorobyov	26 — Krasnoyarsk Krai (№ 5)		member of Legislative Assembly of Krasnoyarsk Krai
Aleksey Pushkov	1954	United Russia	assumed the mandate of Yury Trutnev (Minister of Natural Resources and Environment of the Russian Federation)	27 — Perm Krai (№ 4)	21.12.2011	manager and presenter at the TV channel TV Centre (Russia)
Valery Trapeznikov	1947	United Russia	chosen	27 — Perm Krai (№ 2)		turner at JSC Star
~~Andrey Klimov~~	1954	United Russia	chosen	27 — Perm Krai (№ 3)		
Anatoly Lomakin	1952	United Russia	assumed the mandate of Andrey Klimov	27 — Perm Krai (№ 4)	since 22.08.2012	Owner and CEO of JSC International Potash Company
Elmira Glubokovskaya	1957	United Russia	assumed the mandate of Igor Shuvalov (First Deputy Prime Minister of the Russian Federation) through Konstantin Sidenko (military commander of Eastern Military District)	28 — Primorsky Krai (№ 4)		member of 5th State Duma
Viktor Pinsky	1964	United Russia	assumed the mandate of V. L. Vasilyev (Senior trawlmaster of the Nakhodkinsk base of active marine fisheries)	28 — Primorsky Krai (№ 5)		Chairman of the Federation of Trade Unions of Primorsky Krai, member of Legislative Assembly of Primorsky Krai
~~Valery Zerenkov~~	1948	United Russia	assumed the mandate of Igor Sechin (Deputy Prime Minister of the Russian Federation)	29 — Stavropol Krai (№ 5)		Director General of the State Regional Center for Standardization, metrology and testing in Stavropol Krai
Yuri Em	1953	United Russia	chosen	29 — Stavropol Krai (№ 2)		military commissar of Stavropol Krai
Andrei Murga	1969	United Russia	chosen	29 — Stavropol Krai (№ 3)		President of the Stavropol Territory Chamber of Commerce and Industry, member of Duma of Stavropol Krai
Stanislav Govorukhin	1936	United Russia	chosen	29 — Stavropol Krai (№ 4)		member of 5th State Duma
Boris Reznik	1940	United Russia	assumed the mandate of Vyacheslav Shport (governor of Khabarovsk Krai)	30 — Khabarovsk Krai, Jewish Autonomous Oblast (№ 3)		member of 5th State Duma
Mikhail Moiseyev	1939	United Russia	chosen	30 — Khabarovsk Krai, Jewish Autonomous Oblast (№ 2)		Lead Analyst (Inspector General) of the Ministry of Defense of the Russian Federation, Chairman of the Council of the All-Russian Public Organization of Veterans of the Armed Forces of the Russian Federation
Alexander Shishkin (politician)	1960	United Russia	assumed the mandate	30 — Khabarovsk Krai, Jewish Autonomous Oblast (№ 4)	since 22.05.2012	member of 5th State Duma, Chairman of the Board of Directors of Amurmetall Plant
Rostislav Goldstein	1969	United Russia	assumed the mandate of Oleg Kozhemyako (governor of Amur Oblast)	31 — Amur Oblast (№ 4)		member of 5th State Duma
Vladimir Pekhtin	1950	United Russia	chosen	32 — Arkhangelsk Oblast, Nenets Autonomous Okrug (№ 1)		member of 5th State Duma
~~Sergey Bozhenov~~	1965	United Russia	assumed the mandate of Alexander Zhilkin (governor of Astrakhan Oblast)	33 — Astrakhan Oblast (№ 3)	17.12.2011- 17.01.2012	Mayor of Astrakhan
Leonid Ogul	1963	United Russia	assumed the mandate of resigned Sergey Bozhenov, ставшего Governor of Volgograd Oblast	33 — Astrakhan Oblast (№ 4)	since 27.02.2012	chief physician of the Clinical Maternity Hospital at Astrakhan, member of Duma of Astrakhan Oblast, First Deputy Chairman of the Committee for Health Care and Social Development
Maria Maksakova Jr.	1977	United Russia	chosen	33 — Astrakhan Oblast (№ 2)		vocalist at Helikon Opera
Oleg Lebedev	1964	United Russia	assumed the mandate of Yevgeny Savchenko (governor of Belgorod Oblast)	34 — Belgorod Oblast (№ 4)		member of 5th State Duma
Andrei Skoch	1966	United Russia	chosen	34 — Belgorod Oblast (№ 2)		member of 5th State Duma
Elena Senatorova	1958	United Russia	chosen	34 — Belgorod Oblast (№ 3)		Director of the Valuysk City Employment Center, member of Valuyki city council
~~Andrey Bocharov~~	1969	United Russia	chosen	35 — Bryansk Oblast (№ 1)	by November 2, 2013	member of 5th State Duma
Ekaterina Lakhova	1948	United Russia	chosen	35 — Bryansk Oblast (№ 2)		member of 5th State Duma
Alexander Bogomaz	1961	United Russia	assumed the mandate of Andrey Bocharov	35 — Bryansk Oblast (№ 3)	since November 7, 2013	member of Legislative Assembly of Bryansk Oblast
Igor Igoshin	1970	United Russia	assumed the mandate	36 — Vladimir Oblast (№ 4)		member of 5th State Duma
Grigory Anikeyev	1972	United Russia	chosen	36 — Vladimir Oblast (№ 2)		member of 5th State Duma
Mikhail Markelov	1966	United Russia	assumed the mandate	37 — Volgograd Oblast (№ 4)		Head of the Department for Domestic Policy of the Office of the Presidential Envoy in the North Caucasus Federal District (Administration of the president of Russia)
Oleg Savchenko	1966	United Russia	assumed the mandate	37 — Volgograd Oblast (№ 5)		member of 5th State Duma
Dmitry Konkov	1976	United Russia	chosen	37 — Volgograd Oblast (№ 3)		Oil and gas production operator Russian Innovative Fuel and Energy Company (territorial production enterprise Volgogradneftegaz
Vyacheslav Pozgalyov	1946	United Russia	chosen	38 — Vologda Oblast (№ 1)		governor of Vologda Oblast
Yury Isaev	1972	United Russia	assumed the mandate	39 — Voronezh Oblast (№ 6)		member of 5th State Duma
Galina Karelova	1950	United Russia	chosen	39 — Voronezh Oblast (№ 7)		member of 5th State Duma
Sergey Chizhov	1964	United Russia	assumed the mandate	39 — Voronezh Oblast (№ 7)		member of 5th State Duma
Ilya Kostunov	1980	United Russia	chosen	39 — Voronezh Oblast (№ 4)		Project Director, UNOVA Media LLC
Aleksey Zhuravlyov	1962	United Russia	chosen	39 — Voronezh Oblast (№ 4)		assistant governor at Воронежской области
~~Tatiana Yakovleva~~	1960	United Russia	assumed the mandate	40 — Ivanovo Oblast (№ 2)	4 December 2011 - 15 June 2012	member of 5th State Duma
Sergey Ten	1976	United Russia	assumed the mandate	41 — Irkutsk Oblast (№ 3)		General Director of ZAO Trud, member of the Irkutsk Region Zakzobraniya
Anton Romanov	1952	United Russia	chosen	41 — Irkutsk Oblast (№ 2)		member of Legislative Assembly of Irkutsk Oblast
Alexander Zhukov	1956	United Russia	chosen	42 — Kaliningrad Oblast (№ 1)		Deputy Prime Minister of the Russian Federation
Natalia Burykina	1960	United Russia	assumed the mandate	42 — Kaliningrad Oblast (№ 4)		member of 5th State Duma
Andrey Kolesnik	1956	United Russia	chosen	42 — Kaliningrad Oblast (№ 3)		Director of JSC Kaliningrad Commercial Sea Port, member of the District Council of members of Kaliningrad
Yury Volkov	1954	United Russia	assumed the mandate	43 — Kaluga Oblast (№ 2)		member of 5th State Duma
Sergey Poddubny	1968	United Russia	assumed the mandate	44 — Kemerovo Oblast (№ 8)		athlete-instructor of the A.G. Smolyaninov Children's and Youth Sports School for Freestyle Wrestling
Boris Mikhalyov	1960	United Russia	chosen	44 — Kemerovo Oblast (№ 2)		member of 5th State Duma
Tatiana Alexeeva	1962	United Russia	chosen	44 — Kemerovo Oblast (№ 3)		President of the Kuzbass Chamber of Commerce and Industry
Vladimir Gridin	1955	United Russia	chosen	44 — Kemerovo Oblast (№ 4)		member of 5th State Duma
Pavel Fedyaev	1982	United Russia	assumed the mandate	44 — Kemerovo Oblast (№ 9)		Vice President for Social Policy of Siberian Business Union Holding Company
Nikolai Valuev	1973	United Russia	chosen	44 — Kemerovo Oblast (№ 6)		Consultant of the Nikolai Valuev Charity Fund for the Development of Children and Youth Sports
Alexander Fokin	1954	United Russia	chosen	44 — Kemerovo Oblast (№ 7)		member of 5th State Duma
Vyacheslav Timchenko	1955	United Russia	chosen	45 — Kirov Oblast (№ 1)		member of 5th State Duma
Oleg Valenchuk	1960	United Russia	chosen	45 — Kirov Oblast (№ 2)		member of 5th State Duma
Valery Galchenko	1951	United Russia	assumed the mandate	46 — Kostroma Oblast (№ 2)		member of 5th State Duma
Alexander Iltyakov	1971	United Russia	chosen	47 — Kurgan Oblast (№ 1)		businessman
Gennady Kulik	1935	United Russia	assumed the mandate	48 — Kursk Oblast (№ 3)		member of 5th State Duma
Alexander Bryksin	1967	United Russia	assumed the mandate	48 — Kursk Oblast (№ 4)		Deputy General Director for Investments of CJSC Kurskrezinotechnika
Sergey Naryshkin	1954	United Russia	chosen	49 — Leningrad Oblast (№ 1)		Chief of Presidential Administration of Russia
Sergey Petrov	1965	United Russia	chosen	49 — Leningrad Oblast (№ 2)		member of 5th State Duma
Mikhail Tarasenko	1947	United Russia	assumed the mandate	50 — Lipetsk Oblast (№ 3)		member of 5th State Duma
Nikolay Bortsov	1945	United Russia	chosen	50 — Lipetsk Oblast (№ 2)		member of 5th State Duma
Vladimir Kononov	1947	United Russia	assumed the mandate	52 — Moscow Oblast (№ 8)		CEO of Concor LLC (www.konkor.ru)
Valentina Kabanova	1951	United Russia	chosen	52 — Moscow Oblast (№ 2)		member of 5th State Duma
Mikhail Terentyev	1970	United Russia	chosen	52 — Moscow Oblast (№ 3)		member of 5th State Duma
Martin Shakkum	1951	United Russia	chosen	52 — Moscow Oblast (№ 4)		member of 5th State Duma
Dmitry Sablin	1968	United Russia	chosen	52 — Moscow Oblast (№ 5)		member of 5th State Duma
Vyacheslav Lysakov	1953	United Russia	chosen	52 — Moscow Oblast (№ 6)		Deputy Director General for Innovations, Moscow Institute of Material Science and Effective Technologies (IMET), JSC
Yuri Lipatov	1953	United Russia	chosen	52 — Moscow Oblast (№ 7)		member of 5th State Duma
Valery Yazev	1949	United Russia	chosen	53 — Murmansk Oblast (№ 1)		member of 5th State Duma
Alexander Vasilenko	1948	United Russia	assumed the mandate	54 — Nizhny Novgorod Oblast (№ 6)		Head of Department, OJSC Oil Company Lukoil
Vadim Bulavinov	1963	United Russia	chosen	54 — Nizhny Novgorod Oblast (№ 2)		member of 5th State Duma
Marat Safin	1980	United Russia	chosen	54 — Nizhny Novgorod Oblast (№ 3)		vice president of Russian Tennis Federation
Andrey Makarov	1954	United Russia	chosen	54 — Nizhny Novgorod Oblast (№ 4)		member of 5th State Duma, broadcaster
Nadezhda Gerasimova	1952	United Russia	assumed the mandate	54 — Nizhny Novgorod Oblast (№ 7)		member of 5th State Duma
Sergei Fabrichny	1962	United Russia	assumed the mandate	55 — Novgorod Oblast (№ 2)		chairman of Novgorod Oblast Duma
Aleksandr Karelin	1967	United Russia	chosen	56 — Novosibirsk Oblast (№ 1)		member of 5th State Duma
Irina Manuylova	1965	United Russia	chosen	56 — Novosibirsk Oblast (№ 2)		boarding school principal No. 7 at Berdsk
Sergey Dorofeev	1958	United Russia	chosen	56 — Novosibirsk Oblast (№ 3)		chief physician of city polyclinic No. 1 Novosibirsk
Irina Rodnina	1949	United Russia	assumed the mandate	57 — Omsk Oblast (№ 4)		member of 5th State Duma
Sergey Aleksandrovich Popov	1949	United Russia	chosen	57 — Omsk Oblast (№ 2)		member of 5th State Duma
Victor Shrader	1952	United Russia	chosen	57 — Omsk Oblast (№ 3)		mayor of Omsk
Viktor Zavarzin	1948	United Russia	assumed the mandate	58 — Orenburg Oblast (№ 4)		member of 5th State Duma
Elena Nikolaeva	1969	United Russia	chosen	58 — Orenburg Oblast (№ 2)		President of New Technologies LLC, Deputy Chairman of the all-Russian public organization Business Russia
Nikolay Kovalyov	1949	United Russia	chosen	59 — Oryol Oblast (№ 1)		member of 5th State Duma
Igor Rudensky	1962	United Russia	chosen	60 — Penza Oblast (№ 1)		member of 5th State Duma
Sergey Esyakov	1963	United Russia	assumed the mandate	60 — Penza Oblast (№ 4)		Deputy General Director of Interregional Distribution Grid; Company of Volga, JSC, Director of Penzaenergo branch; member of the Penza Region Legislative Assembly
Nikolay Makarov	1950	United Russia	chosen	60 — Penza Oblast (№ 3)		deputy Presidential Envoy to the Central Federal District
Alexander Vasiliev	1982	United Russia	assumed the mandate	61 — Pskov Oblast (№ 3)		lead engineer Pskov State Polytechnic Institute
Yevgeny Fyodorov	1963	United Russia	assumed the mandate	62 — Rostov Oblast (№ 8)		member of 5th State Duma
Olga Borzova	1949	United Russia	chosen	62 — Rostov Oblast (№ 2)		member of 5th State Duma
Alexander Kaminsky	1957	United Russia	chosen	62 — Rostov Oblast (№ 3)		5th grade shaft sinker of Sherlovskaya-Naklonnaya mine, OJSC Donugol
Vladimir Pligin	1960	United Russia	chosen	62 — Rostov Oblast (№ 4)		member of 5th State Duma
Yevgeny Moskvichev	1957	United Russia	chosen	62 — Rostov Oblast (№ 5)		President of the Association of International Road Carriers
~~Alexey Knyshov~~	1968	United Russia	chosen	62 — Rostov Oblast (№ 6)		CEO of Don Group of Construction Companies, member of the Rostov Region Legislative Assembly
Zoya Stepanova	1953	United Russia	chosen	62 — Rostov Oblast (№ 7)		member of 5th State Duma
Andrey Krasov	1967	United Russia	assumed the mandate	63 — Ryazan Oblast (№ 3)		Head of the Ryazan Guards Higher Airborne Command School (branch of the federal State Military Educational and Research Center Combined Arms Academy of the Armed Forces of the Russian Federation)
Nikolai Bulayev	1949	United Russia	assumed the mandate	63 — Ryazan Oblast (№ 4)		member of 5th State Duma
Viktor Kazakov	1949	United Russia	assumed the mandate	64 — Samara Oblast (№ 5)		member of 5th State Duma
Ekaterina Kuzmicheva	1955	United Russia	assumed the mandate	64 — Samara Oblast (№ 6)		member of 5th State Duma
Alexander Khinshtein	1974	United Russia	chosen	64 — Samara Oblast (№ 3)		member of 5th State Duma
Vladimir Gutenev	1966	United Russia	chosen	64 — Samara Oblast (№ 4)		Advisor to the CEO of the State Corporation Rostec
Mikhail Isaev	1974	United Russia	assumed the mandate	65 — Saratov Oblast (№ 7)		member of Саратовской областной думы
~~Sergey Kancher~~	1955	United Russia	assumed the mandate	65 — Saratov Oblast (№ 8)	17.12.2011—10.04.2012	General Director of CJSC Stroymaterials Engels Brick Plant, member of the Assembly of Deputies Engelssky District
Valery Omelchenko	1961	United Russia	assumed the mandate	25.04.2012	Gas cutter of the railcar assembly shop of JSC Metalware Plant	
~~Lyudmila Bokova~~	1978	United Russia	chosen	65 — Saratov Oblast (№ 3)		History teacher of MOU Gymnasium No. 1 г. Balashov»
Nikolay Pankov	1965	United Russia	chosen	65 — Saratov Oblast (№ 4)		member of 5th State Duma
~~Timur Prokopenko~~	1980	United Russia	chosen	65 — Saratov Oblast (№ 5)	4.12.2011—13.02.2012	chairman of the Coordinating Council of Young Guard of United Russia
Vasily Maximov	1954	United Russia	assumed the mandate	65 — Saratov Oblast (№ 9)	since 20.02.2012	Chief physician of City Clinical Hospital No. 8 in Saratov, member of the Saratov City Duma
Olga Batalina	1975	United Russia	chosen	65 — Saratov Oblast (№ 6)		Vice-rector for innovation development and interaction with the authorities Volga Region Academy of Public Service named after P.A. Stolypin.
Georgy Karlov	1971	United Russia	assumed the mandate	66 — Sakhalin Oblast (№ 2)		CEO of Sakhalin Investment Corporation LLC, member of the Sakhalin Regional Duma
Igor Barinov	1968	United Russia	assumed the mandate	67 — Sverdlovsk Oblast (№ 5)		member of 5th State Duma
Zelimkhan Mutsoev	1959	United Russia	assumed the mandate	67 — Sverdlovsk Oblast (№ 6)	since 29.06.2012	member of 5th State Duma, ranks 66th in the rating of Russia's richest businessmen according to Forbes magazine, which estimates his fortune at $1.5 billion
Alexander Petrov	1958	United Russia	chosen	67 — Sverdlovsk Oblast (№ 2)		CEO of Ural Center for Biopharmaceutical Technologies LLC
Valery Yakushev	1941	United Russia	chosen	67 — Sverdlovsk Oblast (№ 3)		pensioner
Otari Arshba	1955	United Russia	chosen	67 — Sverdlovsk Oblast (№ 4)		member of 5th State Duma
Frants Klintsevich	1957	United Russia	chosen	68 — Smolensk Oblast (№ 1)		member of 5th State Duma
Marina Nazarova	1955	United Russia	assumed the mandate	69 — Tambov Oblast (№ 4)		chairman of Tambov Regional; Professional Organization of Workers of National Education and Science
Viktor Kidyayev	1956	United Russia	chosen	69 — Tambov Oblast (№ 2)		member of 5th State Duma
Alexander Babakov	1963	United Russia	chosen	69 — Tambov Oblast (№ 3)		member of 5th State Duma
Vladimir Vasilyev	1949	United Russia	assumed the mandate	70 — Tver Oblast (№ 3)		member of 5th State Duma
Svetlana Maximova	1961	United Russia	chosen	70 — Tver Oblast (№ 2)		businessman
Lyudmila Ogorodova	1957	United Russia	assumed the mandate	71 — Tomsk Oblast (№ 2)		Vice-Rector for Research and Postgraduate Training «Siberian State Medical University»
Boris Zubitsky	1947	United Russia	assumed the mandate	72 — Tula Oblast (№ 5)		member of 5th State Duma
Vladimir Afonsky	1966	United Russia	assumed the mandate of Vladimir Gruzdev (№ 2) (Governor of Tula oblast)	72 — Tula Oblast (№ 6)		member of Tula Oblast Duma
Nadezhda Shaydenko	1952	United Russia	assumed the mandate	72 — Tula Oblast (№ 7)		rector of Tula State Pedagogical University named after L.N.Tolstoy.
Dmitry Savelyev	1968	United Russia	chosen	72 — Tula Oblast (№ 4)		member of 5th State Duma
Ernest Valeev	1950	United Russia	assumed the mandate	73 — Tyumen Oblast (№ 5)		deputy governor of Tyumen Oblast
Ivan Kvitka	1967	United Russia	chosen	73 — Tyumen Oblast (№ 2)		member of 5th State Duma
Anatoly Karpov	1951	United Russia	chosen	73 — Tyumen Oblast (№ 3)		President of the International Association of Peace Foundations, world chess champion
~~Ekaterina Semyonova~~	1972	United Russia	chosen	73 — Tyumen Oblast (№ 4)		member of 5th State Duma
Vladislav Tretiak	1952	United Russia	assumed the mandate	74 — Ulyanovsk Oblast (№ 3)		member of 5th State Duma
Grigory Balykhin	1946	United Russia	chosen	74 — Ulyanovsk Oblast (№ 2)		member of 5th State Duma
Oleg Kolesnikov	1968	United Russia	assumed the mandate	75 — Chelyabinsk Oblast (№ 7)		member of 5th State Duma
Alexei Bobrakov	1981	United Russia	assumed the mandate	75 — Chelyabinsk Oblast (№ 8)		senior human resources specialist at Magnitogorsk Iron and Steel Works
Dmitry Vyatkin	1974	United Russia	assumed the mandate	75 — Chelyabinsk Oblast (№ 9)		member of 5th State Duma
Vladimir Burmatov	1981	United Russia	chosen	75 — Chelyabinsk Oblast (№ 4)		Advisor to the Secretariat of the Presidium of the General Council of the United Russia Party, Deputy Head of the Central Headquarters of the Young Guard of United Russia
Vadim Belousov	1960	United Russia	chosen	75 — Chelyabinsk Oblast (№ 5)		CEO of LLC Makfa Management Company, member of the Board of Directors of OJSC Sverdlovsk Bread and Pasta Plant, member of Legislative Assembly of Chelyabinsk Oblast
Alexander Kretov	1972	United Russia	chosen	75 — Chelyabinsk Oblast (№ 6)		chairman of the Board of Directors of the Chelyabinsk Electrometallurgical; Combine, member of Legislative Assembly of Chelyabinsk Oblast
Valentina Tereshkova	1937	United Russia	assumed the mandate	76 — Yaroslavl Oblast (№ 2)		member of Yaroslavl Oblast Duma, deputy chairman of the council
Danil Volkov	1975	United Russia	assumed the mandate	77 — Moscow (№ 16)		First Deputy Director General of the State Budgetary Institution of Moscow City Advertising and Information.
Lyudmila Shvetsova	1949	United Russia	chosen	77 — Moscow (№ 2)		deputy Mayor of Moscow at Government of Moscow on social policy
Vladimir Krupennikov	1969	United Russia	chosen	77 — Moscow (№ 3)		member of 5th State Duma
Vladimir Dolgikh	1924	United Russia	chosen	77 — Moscow (№ 4)		
Nikolay Gonchar	1946	United Russia	chosen	77 — Moscow (№ 5)		member of 5th State Duma
Andrey Isayev	1964	United Russia	chosen	77 — Moscow (№ 6)		member of 5th State Duma
Vladimir Resin	1936	United Russia	chosen	77 — Moscow (№ 7)		first deputy Mayor of Moscow at Government of Moscow
Elena Panina	1948	United Russia	chosen	77 — Moscow (№ 8)		member of 5th State Duma
Ildar Gabdrakhmanov	1974	United Russia	chosen	77 — Moscow (№ 9)		member of 5th State Duma
Sergei Zheleznyak	1970	United Russia	chosen	77 — Moscow (№ 10)		member of 5th State Duma
Viktor Zvagelsky	1963	United Russia	chosen	77 — Moscow (№ 11)		member of 5th State Duma
Vyacheslav Nikonov	1956	United Russia	chosen	77 — Moscow (№ 12)		Executive Director of the Board of Directors of the Russian World Foundation
Mariya Kozhevnikova	1984	United Russia	chosen	77 — Moscow (№ 13)		businessman, member of Young Guard of United Russia, member of the Public Council of the Young Guard of United Russia
Anton Zharkov	1967	United Russia	chosen	77 — Moscow (№ 14)		Director of the Department of Financial and Economic Policy in the sphere of industrial production of the commercial bank Russobank
Anatoly Vyborny	1965	United Russia	chosen	77 — Moscow (№ 15)		Executive Director of Finsudprom Foreign Economic Enterprise CJSC
Vitaliy Aleksandrovich Yuzhilin	1965	United Russia	assumed the mandate	78 — Saint Petersburg (№ 6)		member of 5th State Duma
Vasily Shestakov	1953	United Russia	assumed the mandate	78 — Saint Petersburg (№ 7)		member of 5th State Duma
Yury Petrov	1947	United Russia	assumed the mandate	78 — Saint Petersburg (№ 8)		chief of Federal Agency for State Property Management
Irina Sokolova	1956	United Russia	chosen	78 — Saint Petersburg (№ 4)		member of 5th State Duma
Vladislav Reznik	1954	United Russia	chosen	78 — Saint Petersburg (№ 5)		member of 5th State Duma
Pavel Zavalny	1961	United Russia	assumed the mandate	79 — Khanty-Mansi Autonomous Okrug (№ 3)		General Director of Gazprom Transgaz Yugorsk, member of Duma of Khanty-Mansi Autonomous Okrug — Yugra
Leonid Simanovsky	1949	United Russia	assumed the mandate	79 — Khanty-Mansi Autonomous Okrug (№ 3)		member of 5th State Duma
Grigory Ledkov	1969	United Russia	assumed the mandate	80 — Yamalo-Nenets Autonomous Okrug (№ 3)		chairman of the Tazovsky agricultural cooperative
Dmitry Khorolya	1958	United Russia	chosen	80 — Yamalo-Nenets Autonomous Okrug (№ 2)		Deputy Head of the International Projects and Programs Division of the International Activities Department of International and Foreign Economic Relations of the Yamalo-Nenets Autonomous Okrug.
Gennady Zyuganov fraction leader	1944	Communist Party	chosen	General part of the list (№ 1)		member of 5th State Duma
Vladimir Komoyedov	1950	Communist Party	chosen	General part of the list (№ 2)		member of 5th State Duma
Yury Afonin	1977	Communist Party	chosen	General part of the list (№ 3)		member of 5th State Duma
Zhores Alferov	1930	Communist Party	chosen	General part of the list (№ 4)		member of 5th State Duma
Svetlana Savitskaya	1948	Communist Party	chosen	General part of the list (№ 5)		member of 5th State Duma
Ivan Melnikov	1950	Communist Party	chosen	General part of the list (№ 6)		member of 5th State Duma
Vladimir Kashin	1945	Communist Party	chosen	General part of the list (№ 7)		member of 5th State Duma
Viktor Cherkesov	1950	Communist Party	chosen	General part of the list (№ 8)		pensioner of Federal Security Service
Dmitry Novikov	1969	Communist Party	chosen	General part of the list (№ 9)		member of 5th State Duma
Kazbek Taysaev	1967	Communist Party	chosen	General part of the list (№ 10)		member of Parliament of the Republic of North Ossetia–Alania
Alexander Yushchenko	1969	Communist Party	chosen	3 — Bashkortostan — Birskaya, Ufimskaya (No. 1)		
Andrei Tychinin	1971	Communist Party	chosen	4 — Bashkortostan — Salavatskaya, Sterlitamakskaya (No. 1)		
Vyacheslav Markhayev	1955	Communist Party	chosen	5 — Республика Бурятия (№ 1)		
Sergey Reshulsky	1951	Communist Party	chosen	6 — Dagestan (№ 1)		member of 5th State Duma
Anatoly Bifov	1963	Communist Party	chosen	8 — Kabardino-Balkaria, Karachay-Cherkessia (№ 1)		President of Arksbank OJSC
Boris Kashin	1951	Communist Party	chosen	10 — Republic of Karelia, Murmansk Oblast (№ 1)		member of 5th State Duma
Andrey Anatoliyevich Andreyev	1976	Communist Party	chosen	11 — Komi Republic, Arkhangelsk Oblast (№ 1)		member of 5th State Duma
Robert Kochiev	1966	Communist Party	chosen	15 — North Ossetia–Alania (№ 1)		Deputy General Director of Zabava LLC, member of the Parliament of the Republic of North Ossetia-Alania
Vasily Likhachyov	1952	Communist Party	chosen	16 — Tatarstan — Moskovskaya, Tsentralnaya (No. 1)		advisor to Mikhail Shmakov, Chairman of the Federation of Independent Trade Unions of Russia on legal, diplomatic and international legal issues
Victor Peshkov	1945	Communist Party	chosen	17 — Tatarstan — Naberezhnochelninskaya, Neftyanaya (No. 1)		parliamentary assistant at 5th State Duma
Nikolai Sapozhnikov	1949	Communist Party	chosen	19 — Udmurtia (№ 1)		member of 5th State Duma
Valentin Shurchanov	1947	Communist Party	chosen	22 — Chuvashia (№ 1)		member of 5th State Duma
Mikhail Zapolev	1946	Communist Party	chosen	23 — Altai Krai (№ 1)		Advisor to the chairman of the Communist Party Central Committee G. A. Zyuganov, member of the Altai Territory Legislative Assembly
Sergey Yurchenko	1948	Communist Party	chosen	23 — Altai Krai (№ 3)		pensioner, member of the Altai Territory Legislative Assembly
Vladimir Pozdnyakov	1946	Communist Party	chosen	24 — Zabaykalsky Krai, Amur oblast (№ 1)		Senior Desk Officer of the Communist Party faction in the State Duma
Nikolay Kharitonov	1948	Communist Party	chosen	26 — Krasnodar Krai (№ 1)		member of 5th State Duma
Sergei Obukhov	1958	Communist Party	chosen	26 — Krasnodar Krai (№ 2)		member of 5th State Duma
Konstantin Shirshov	1974	Communist Party	assumed the mandate	26 — Krasnodar Krai (№ 4)		member of 5th State Duma
Mikhail Berulava	1950	Communist Party	chosen	27 — Krasnoyarsk Krai (№ 1)		rector of the non-state university of the Russian Academy of Education, зrofessor
Vakha Agaev	1953	Communist Party	assumed the mandate	27 — Krasnoyarsk Krai (№ 3)		chairman of the Supervisory Board of Yug-Nefteprodukt LLC
Oleg Kulikov	1946	Communist Party	chosen	28 — Perm Krai (№ 1)		member of 5th State Duma
Alexey Kornienko	1976	Communist Party	chosen	29 — Primorsky Krai (№ 1)		member of 5th State Duma
Victor Goncharov	1959	Communist Party	chosen	30 — Stavropol Krai (№ 1)		member of the Duma of the Stavropol Krai
Sergey Shtogrin	1948	Communist Party	chosen	31 — Khabarovsk Krai, Jewish Autonomous Oblast (№ 1)		member of 5th State Duma
Nikolay Arefiev	1949	Communist Party	chosen	32 — Astrakhan Oblast, Volgograd Oblast (№ 1)		Senior Desk Officer of the Communist Party faction in the State Duma
Alevtina Aparina	1941	Communist Party	chosen	32 — Astrakhan Oblast, Volgograd Oblast (№ 2)		member of 5th State Duma
Sergey Muravlenko	1950	Communist Party	chosen	33 — Belgorod Oblast (№ 1)		member of 5th State Duma
Peter Romanov	1943	Communist Party	chosen	34 — Bryansk Oblast (№ 1)		member of 5th State Duma
Victor Pautov	1953	Communist Party	chosen	35 — Vladimir Oblast (№ 1)		member of 5th State Duma
Sergey Vasiltsov	1949	Communist Party	chosen	36 — Vologda Oblast, Novgorod Oblast (№ 1)		Senior Desk Officer of the Communist Party faction in the State Duma
Sergei Gavrilov	1966	Communist Party	chosen	37 — Voronezh Oblast (№ 1)		member of 5th State Duma
Ruslan Gostev	1945	Communist Party	chosen	37 — Voronezh Oblast (№ 2)		member of 5th State Duma
Alexey Ponomaryov	1942	Communist Party	chosen	38 — Ivanovo Oblast, Kostroma Oblast (№ 1)		member of 5th State Duma
Sergey Levchenko	1953	Communist Party	chosen	39 — Irkutsk Oblast (№ 1)		member of 5th State Duma
Evgeny Rulkov	1950	Communist Party	chosen	39 — Irkutsk Oblast (№ 2)		member of Legislative Assembly of the Irkutsk Oblast
Vladimir Nikitin	1948	Communist Party	chosen	40 — Kaliningrad Oblast, Pskov oblast (№ 1)		member of 5th State Duma
Boris Komotsky	1956	Communist Party	chosen	41 — Kaluga oblast, Smolensk Oblast (№ 1)		Senior Desk Officer of the Communist Party Faction in the State Duma
Sergei Sobko	1949	Communist Party	chosen	42 — Kemerovo Oblast (№ 1)		member of 5th State Duma
Sergey Mamaev	1958	Communist Party	chosen	43 — Kirov Oblast (№ 1)		Member of Legislative Assembly of the Kirov Oblast, Deputy Chairman
Nikolay Ivanov	1957	Communist Party	chosen	45 — Kursk Oblast (№ 1)		member of Kursk Oblast Duma
Vadim Potomsky	1972	Communist Party	chosen	46 — Leningrad Oblast (№ 1)		member of Legislative Assembly of the Leningrad Oblast
Nikolay Razvorotnev	1954	Communist Party	chosen	47 — Lipetsk Oblast (№ 1)		member of 5th State Duma
Nikolay Vasiliev	1958	Communist Party	chosen	48 — Moscow Oblast (№ 1)		member of Moscow Oblast Duma of the 4th convocation, Communist Party faction leader
Aleksey Russkikh	1968	Communist Party	chosen	48 — Moscow Oblast (№ 2)		member of 5th State Duma
Victor Taranin	1957	Communist Party	assumed the mandate	48 — Moscow Oblast (№ 7)		member of 5th State Duma
Boris Ivanyuzhenkov	1966	Communist Party	assumed the mandate	48 — Moscow Oblast (№ 8)		President-Rector of the Podolsk Social Sports Institute
Mikhail Avdeev	1977	Communist Party	chosen	48 — Moscow Oblast (№ 5)		member of Moscow Oblast Duma of the 4th convocation
Nikolay Ryabov	1949	Communist Party	chosen	49 — Nizhny Novgorod Oblast — Nizhegorodskaya, Semyonovskaya (No. 1)		member of 5th State Duma
Alexander Tarnayev	1952	Communist Party	chosen	50 — Nizhny Novgorod Oblast — Arzamasskaya, Kstovskaya (No. 1)		Assistant to State Duma deputy, member of Legislative Assembly of Nizhny Novgorod Oblast
Denis Voronenkov	1971	Communist Party	chosen	50 — Nizhny Novgorod Oblast — Arzamasskaya, Kstovskaya (No. 2)		
Anatoly Lokot	1959	Communist Party	chosen	51 — Novosibirsk Oblast (№ 1)	Surrendered his mandate in connection with his election as Mayor of Novosibirsk. Mandate was handed over to Vera Ganzya.	member of 5th State Duma
Alexander Abalakov	1959	Communist Party	chosen	51 — Novosibirsk Oblast (№ 2)		General Director of CJSC Mayak
Kravets Alexander	1950	Communist Party	chosen	52 — Omsk Oblast, Тomsk Oblast (№ 1)		senior desk officer of the Communist Party faction in the State Duma
Oleg Denisenko	1962	Communist Party	chosen	52 — Omsk Oblast, Тomsk Oblast (№ 2)		member of 5th State Duma
Valentin Chikin	1932	Communist Party	chosen	53 — Orenburg Oblast (№ 1)		member of 5th State Duma
Vasily Ikonnikov	1961	Communist Party	chosen	54 — Oryol Oblast (№ 1)		member of Orel Regional Council of People's Deputies, head of the Communist Party faction
Tamara Pletnyova	1947	Communist Party	chosen	55 — Penza Oblast, Tambov Oblast (№ 1)		member of 5th State Duma
Vladimir Simagin	1974	Communist Party	chosen	55 — Penza Oblast, Tambov Oblast (№ 2)		
Nikolay Kolomeitsev	1956	Communist Party	chosen	56 — Rostov Oblast (№ 1)		member of 5th State Duma
Viktor Kolomeitsev	1953	Communist Party	chosen	56 — Rostov Oblast (№ 2)		member of 5th State Duma
Vladimir Bessonov	1966	Communist Party	chosen	56 — Rostov Oblast (№ 3)		
Vladimir Fedotkin	1947	Communist Party	chosen	57 — Ryazan Oblast (№ 1)		member of 5th State Duma
Leonid Kalashnikov	1960	Communist Party	chosen	58 — Samara Oblast (№ 1)		member of 5th State Duma
Valentin Romanov	1937	Communist Party	chosen	58 — Samara Oblast (№ 1)		member of 5th State Duma
Olga Alimova	1953	Communist Party	chosen	59 — Saratov Oblast (№ 1)		member of Saratov Oblast Duma
Nikolay Ezersky	1956	Communist Party	chosen	61 — Sverdlovsk Oblast — Nizhny Tagilskaya, Pervouralskaya, Serovskaya (No. 1)		member of 5th State Duma
Pavel Dorokhin	1965	Communist Party	chosen	62 — Sverdlovsk Oblast — Kamensk-Uralskaya, Tsentralnaya (No. 1)		Advisor to Deputy Director General of Rosoboronexport OJSC
Vadim Solovyov	1958	Communist Party	chosen	63 — Tver Oblast (№ 1)		member of 5th State Duma
~~Vasily Starodubtsev~~	1931	Communist Party	chosen	64 — Tula Oblast (№ 1)	15—30.12.2011 died, mandate given to Oleg Lebedev	member of 5th State Duma
Oleg Lebedev	1976	Communist Party	assumed the mandate of Vasily Starodubtsev (№ 1)	64 — Tula Oblast (№ 2)	since 31.01.2012	member of Tula Oblast Duma, Deputy Chairman
Vyacheslav Tetyokin	1949	Communist Party	chosen	65 — Tyumen Oblast, Khanty-Mansi Autonomous Okrug (№ 1)		Chief Desk Officer of the Communist Party faction in the State Duma
Yury Sinelshchikov	1947	Communist Party	chosen	66 — Ulyanovsk Oblast (№ 1)		Associate Professor of the Department of Criminal Procedure and Criminalistics, Faculty of Law at Moscow City Pedagogical University
Ivan Nikitchuk	1944	Communist Party	assumed the mandate	67 — Chelyabinsk Oblast (№ 3)		parliamentary assistant at 5th State Duma
Alexander Nekrasov	1963	Communist Party	chosen	67 — Chelyabinsk Oblast (№ 2)		Construction Director of Leader LLC
Alexander Kulikov	1950	Communist Party	chosen	68 — Yaroslavl Oblast (№ 1)		member of 5th State Duma
Valery Rashkin	1955	Communist Party	chosen	69 — Moscow (№ 1)		member of 5th State Duma
Vladimir Rodin	1953	Communist Party	assumed the mandate	69 — Moscow (№ 8)		First Deputy General Director of CJSC Gorod
Vadim Kumin	1973	Communist Party	chosen	69 — Moscow (№ 3)		member of Moscow City Council
Oleg Smolin	1952	Communist Party	chosen	69 — Moscow (№ 4)		member of 5th State Duma
Alexander Potapov	1954	Communist Party	chosen	69 — Moscow (№ 5)		Advisor to the Deputy at Moscow City Duma
Yevgeny Dorovin	1949	Communist Party	chosen	69 — Moscow (№ 6)		Deputy Chief of Staff of the Committee for Industry at 5th State Duma
Svyatoslav Sokol	1946	Communist Party	chosen	70 — Saint Petersburg (№ 1)		member of 5th State Duma
Vladimir Bortko	1946	Communist Party	chosen	70 — Saint Petersburg (№ 2)		General Director of Studio 2-B-2 Intertainment CJSC
Vladimir Zhirinovsky fraction leader	1946	Liberal Democratic Party	chosen	General part of the list (№ 1)	since 15.12.2011	member of 5th State Duma
~~Alexey Ostrovsky~~	1976	Liberal Democratic Party	chosen	General part of the list (№ 2)	15.12.2011—22.5.2012	member of 5th State Duma
Igor Lebedev	1972	Liberal Democratic Party	chosen	General part of the list (№ 3)	since 15.12.2011	member of 5th State Duma
Yaroslav Nilov	1982	Liberal Democratic Party	chosen	General part of the list (№ 4)	since 15.12.2011	member of 5th State Duma
Alexei Didenko	1983	Liberal Democratic Party	chosen	General part of the list (№ 5)	since 15.12.2011	assistant deputy at 5th State Duma in Tomsk Oblast Administration
Sergey Kalashnikov	1951	Liberal Democratic Party	chosen	General part of the list (№ 6)	since 15.12.2011	Director of the Institute of Social Insurance, Economics and Law; Russian State Social University
Leonid Slutsky (politician)	1968	Liberal Democratic Party	chosen	General part of the list (№ 7)	since 15.12.2011	member of 5th State Duma
Valery Seleznev	1964	Liberal Democratic Party	chosen	General part of the list (№ 8)	since 15.12.2011	member of 5th State Duma
Dmitry Svishchev	1969	Liberal Democratic Party	chosen	General part of the list (№ 9)	since 15.12.2011	member of 5th State Duma
Yury Napso	1973	Liberal Democratic Party	chosen	General part of the list (№ 10)	since 15.12.2011	member of 5th State Duma
Ivan Sukharev	1978	Liberal Democratic Party	chosen	3 — Bashkortostan — Birskaya, Sterlitamakskaya, Ufimskaya (No. 1)	since 15.12.2011	chairman of Financial and Economic Bar Association
Alexander Starovoitov	1972	Liberal Democratic Party	chosen	10 — Kalmykia, Astrakhan Oblast, Kaliningrad Oblast (№ 1)	since 15.12.2011	Deputy Chairman of the City Council of Astrakhan
Kirill Cherkasov	1967	Liberal Democratic Party	chosen	14 — Mari El, Kirov Oblast (№ 1)	since 15.12.2011	member of 5th State Duma
Sergey Marinin	1971	Liberal Democratic Party	chosen	15 — Mordovia, Ulyanovsk Oblast (№ 1)	since 15.12.2011	member of Legislative Assembly of the Ulyanovsk oblast
Ivan Abramov	1978	Liberal Democratic Party	chosen	16 — Sakha Republic, Kamchatka Krai, Amur oblast, Magadan oblast, Chukotka Autonomous Okrug (№ 1)	since 15.12.2011	member of Legislative Assembly of the Amur Oblast
Markin Andrei	1965	Liberal Democratic Party	chosen	21 — Udmurtia (№ 1)	since 15.12.2011	
Vladimir Semyonov	1967	Liberal Democratic Party	chosen	25 — Altai Krai (№ 1)	since 15.12.2011	member of 5th State Duma
Vasilina Kuliyeva	1981	Liberal Democratic Party	chosen	26 — Zabaykalsky Krai (№ 1)	since 15.12.2011	
Alexander Kropachev	1981	Liberal Democratic Party	chosen	27 — Krasnodar Krai — Armavirskaya, Kanevskaya (No. 1)	since 15.12.2011	assistant to the 5th State Duma deputy in the Krasnodar Krai administration
Vladimir Ovsyannikov	1961	Liberal Democratic Party	chosen	28 — Krasnodar Krai — Krasnodarskaya, Krymskaya, Sochinskaya (No. 1)	since 15.12.2011	Head of the Secretariat of the Vice-Chairman at 5th State Duma
Dmitri Nossov	1980	Liberal Democratic Party	chosen	29 — Krasnoyarsk Krai (№ 1)	since 15.12.2011	Deputy General Director of Forward LLC
Eduard Markin	1968	Liberal Democratic Party	chosen	30 — Perm Krai (№ 1)	since 15.12.2011	member of 5th State Duma
Ruslan Kalyuzhny	1973	Liberal Democratic Party	chosen	31 — Primorsky Krai (№ 1)	since 15.12.2011	
Ilya Drozdov	1972	Liberal Democratic Party	chosen	32 — Stavropol Krai (№ 1)	since 15.12.2011	
Sergei Furgal	1970	Liberal Democratic Party	chosen	33 — Khabarovsk Krai, Sakhalin Oblast, Jewish Autonomous Oblast (№ 1)	since 15.12.2011	member of 5th State Duma
Irina Chirkova	1982	Liberal Democratic Party	chosen	34 — Arkhangelsk Oblast, Nenets Autonomous Okrug (№ 1)	since 15.12.2011	
Natalia Gubareva	1967	Liberal Democratic Party	chosen	35 — Belgorod Oblast (№ 1)	since 15.12.2011	Marketing specialist of CJSC Plant of non-standard equipment and metalware, member of Belgorod Oblast Duma
Vitaly Zolochevsky	1986	Liberal Democratic Party	chosen	37 — Vladimir Oblast (№ 1)	since 15.12.2011	
Dmitry Litvintsev	1971	Liberal Democratic Party	chosen	38 — Volgograd Oblast (№ 1)	since 15.12.2011	Deputy General Director of CJSC Volzhskprodkompleks
Sergey Karginov	1969	Liberal Democratic Party	chosen	39 — Vologda Oblast (№ 1)	since 15.12.2011	member of Legislative Assembly of the Vologda Oblast
Sergei Zhuravlev	1966	Liberal Democratic Party	chosen	40 — Voronezh Oblast (№ 1)	since 15.12.2011	
Sergey Sirotkin (politician)	1952	Liberal Democratic Party	chosen	41 — Ivanovo Oblast, Kostroma Oblast (№ 1)	since 15.12.2011	
Andrey Lugovoy	1966	Liberal Democratic Party	chosen	42 — Irkutsk Oblast (№ 1)	since 15.12.2011	member of 5th State Duma
Dmitry Savelyev	1971	Liberal Democratic Party	chosen	44 — Kemerovo Oblast (№ 1)	since 15.12.2011	
Igor Ananskikh	1966	Liberal Democratic Party	chosen	47 — Leningrad Oblast (№ 1)	since 15.12.2011	General Director of Artistic and Production Association OJSC
Sergey Ivanov	1969	Liberal Democratic Party	chosen	49 — Moscow Oblast — Dmitrovskaya, Kolomenskaya, Lyuberetskaya, Noginskaya (No. 1)	since 15.12.2011	member of 5th State Duma
Sergey Zhigarev	1969	Liberal Democratic Party	chosen	50 — Moscow Oblast — Istrinskaya, Podolskaya, Serpukhovskaya, Khimkinskaya (No. 1)	since 15.12.2011	
Aleksandr Kurdyumov	1967	Liberal Democratic Party	chosen	52 — Nizhny Novgorod Oblast (№ 1)	since 15.12.2011	
Vadim Dengin	1980	Liberal Democratic Party	chosen	54 — Novosibirsk Oblast (№ 1)	since 15.12.2011	Senior Specialist 2 level of the State Duma Committee on Youth Affairs
Jan Zielinski	1980	Liberal Democratic Party	chosen	55 — Omsk Oblast (№ 1)	since 15.12.2011	
Yelena Afanasyeva (politician)	1975	Liberal Democratic Party	chosen	56 — Orenburg Oblast (№ 1)	since 15.12.2011	member of 5th State Duma, Member of the Committee on Family, Women and Children's Issues
Roman Khudyakov	1977	Liberal Democratic Party	assumed the mandate	59 — Pskov oblast (№ 1)	since 22.05.2012	
Valentin Sviridov	1967	Liberal Democratic Party	chosen	61 — Rostov Oblast — Kamenskaya, Novocherkasskaya, Taganrogskaya (No. 1)	since 15.12.2011	
Mikhail Degtyarev	1981	Liberal Democratic Party	chosen	64 — Samara Oblast (№ 1)	since 15.12.2011	
Anton Ishchenko	1973	Liberal Democratic Party	chosen	65 — Saratov Oblast (№ 1)	since 15.12.2011	
Konstantin Subbotin	1982	Liberal Democratic Party	chosen	66 — Sverdlovsk Oblast — Kamensk-Uralskaya, Central (No. 1)	since 15.12.2011	
Vladimir Taskaev	1962	Liberal Democratic Party	chosen	67 — Sverdlovsk Oblast — Nizhny Tagil, Pervouralskaya, Serovskaya (No. 1)	since 15.12.2011	member of 5th State Duma
Alexander Balberov	1962	Liberal Democratic Party	chosen	72 — Tula Oblast (№ 1)	since 15.12.2011	
Maxim Shingarkin	1968	Liberal Democratic Party	chosen	73 — Tyumen Oblast (№ 1)	since 15.12.2011	
Vasiliy Zhurko	1963	Liberal Democratic Party	chosen	74 — Chelyabinsk Oblast — Zlatoustskaya, Magnitogorskaya (No. 1)	since 15.12.2011	member of 5th State Duma
Sergei Weinstein	1978	Liberal Democratic Party	chosen	75 — Chelyabinsk Oblast — Kalininskaya, Kyshtymskaya (No. 1)	since 15.12.2011	CEO of Industrial Investments Management Company LLC
Свергунова Маргарита	1974	Liberal Democratic Party	chosen	76 — Yaroslavl Oblast (№ 1)	since 15.12.2011	
Victor Sobolev	1973	Liberal Democratic Party	chosen	77 — Moscow — Восточная, Люблинская, Медведковская (№ 1)	since 15.12.2011	
Andrey Svintsov	1978	Liberal Democratic Party	chosen	79 — Moscow — Kuntsevskaya, Tsaritsinskaya, Cheremushkinskaya (No. 1)	since 15.12.2011	
Maksim Rokhmistrov	1968	Liberal Democratic Party	chosen	80 — Moscow — Tushinskaya, Sheremetevskaya (No. 1)	since 15.12.2011	member of 5th State Duma
Denis Volchek	1971	Liberal Democratic Party	chosen	81 — Saint Petersburg (№ 1)	since 15.12.2011	member of 5th State Duma
Vasily Tarasyuk	1948	Liberal Democratic Party	chosen	82 — Khanty-Mansi Autonomous Okrug, Yamalo-Nenets Autonomous Okrug (№ 1)	since 15.12.2011	member of 5th State Duma
Sergey Mironov fraction leader	1953	A Just Russia — For Truth	chosen	General part of the list (№ 1)		member of 5th State Duma
Nikolai Levichev	1953	A Just Russia — For Truth	chosen	General part of the list (№ 2)		member of 5th State Duma
Oksana Dmitriyeva	1958	A Just Russia — For Truth	chosen	General part of the list (№ 3)		member of 5th State Duma, member of the Committee on Budget and Taxation
Ломакин-Румянцев Александр	1954	A Just Russia — For Truth	chosen	General part of the list (№ 4)		member of 5th State Duma
Andrey Tumanov	1961	A Just Russia — For Truth	chosen	General part of the list (№ 5)		
Leonid Levin	1974	A Just Russia — For Truth	chosen	General part of the list (№ 6)		
Ivan Grachev	1952	A Just Russia — For Truth	chosen	General part of the list (№ 7)		member of 5th State Duma
Yelena Drapeko	1948	A Just Russia — For Truth	chosen	General part of the list (№ 8)		member of 5th State Duma
Nikolai Lakutin	1954	A Just Russia — For Truth	chosen	3 — Bashkortostan — Birskaya, Ufimskaya (No. 1)		
~~Konstantin Ilkovsky~~	1964	A Just Russia — For Truth	chosen	5 — Buryatia, Zabaykalsky Krai (№ 1)		
Vadim Kharlov	1966	A Just Russia — For Truth	chosen	10 — Mordovia, Ulyanovsk Oblast (№ 1)		
Fedot Tumusov	1955	A Just Russia — For Truth	chosen	11 — Sakha Republic, Kamchatka Krai, Amur oblast, Magadan oblast (№ 1)		member of 5th State Duma
Viktor Shudegov	1952	A Just Russia — For Truth	chosen	18 — Udmurtia (№ 1)		member of 5th State Duma
Anatoly Aksakov	1957	A Just Russia — For Truth	chosen	19 — Mari El, Chuvashia (№ 1)		member of 5th State Duma
Alexander Terentyev	1961	A Just Russia — For Truth	chosen	20 — Altai Krai (№ 1)		member of 5th State Duma
Andrey Rudenko	1967	A Just Russia — For Truth	chosen	21 — Krasnodar Krai — Armavirskaya, Kanevskaya (No. 1)		Executive Director of VIP consulting company
Vladimir Mashkarin	1956	A Just Russia — For Truth	chosen	21 — Krasnodar Krai — Krymskaya, Sochinskaya (No. 1)		
Valery Zubov	1953	A Just Russia — For Truth	chosen	24 — Krasnoyarsk Krai, Тomsk Oblast (№ 1)		member of 5th State Duma
Oganyan Oganes	1961	A Just Russia — For Truth	chosen	25 — Perm Krai (№ 1)		
Svetlana Goryacheva	1947	A Just Russia — For Truth	chosen	26 — Primorsky Krai (№ 1)		member of 5th State Duma
Alexey Lysyakov	1969	A Just Russia — For Truth	assumed the mandate	27 — Stavropol Krai (№ 2)		
Alla Kuzmina	1963	A Just Russia — For Truth	chosen	28 — Khabarovsk Krai, Sakhalin Oblast, Jewish Autonomous Oblast (№ 1)		member of 5th State Duma
Olga Yepifanova	1966	A Just Russia — For Truth	chosen	29 — Komi Republic, Arkhangelsk Oblast (№ 1)		
Yuri Selivanov	1940	A Just Russia — For Truth	chosen	31 — Belgorod Oblast (№ 1)		
Anton Belyakov	1972	A Just Russia — For Truth	chosen	33 — Vladimir Oblast (№ 1)		member of 5th State Duma
Oleg Mikheev	1967	A Just Russia — For Truth	chosen	34 — Volgograd Oblast (№ 1)		member of 5th State Duma, Member of the Financial Market Committee
Alexey Chepa	1955	A Just Russia — For Truth	chosen	35 — Vologda Oblast, Novgorod Oblast, Tver Oblast (№ 1)		
Aleksey Mitrofanov	1962	A Just Russia — For Truth	chosen	35 — Vologda Oblast, Novgorod Oblast, Tver Oblast (№ 3)		President of the Veterans' Rights Fund for the support of war and labor veterans
Oleg Pakholkov	1971	A Just Russia — For Truth	chosen	36 — Voronezh Oblast (№ 1)		
Andrey Ozerov	1966	A Just Russia — For Truth	chosen	37 — Ivanovo Oblast, Kostroma Oblast (№ 1)		
Крутов Андрей	1977	A Just Russia — For Truth	chosen	38 — Irkutsk Oblast (№ 1)		
Mikhail Bryachak	1957	A Just Russia — For Truth	chosen	39 — Kaliningrad Oblast, Псковская область (№ 1)		
Alexander Chetverikov	1972	A Just Russia — For Truth	chosen	40 — Калужская область, Kursk Oblast, Oryol Oblast (№ 1)		member of 5th State Duma
Dmitry Gorovtsov	1966	A Just Russia — For Truth	chosen	41 — Kemerovo Oblast (№ 1)		
Sergey Doronin	1965	A Just Russia — For Truth	chosen	42 — Kirov Oblast (№ 1)		
Roman Vanchugov	1972	A Just Russia — For Truth	chosen	44 — Republic of Karelia, Leningrad Oblast (№ 1)		CEO of Lensotszhilstroy LLC
Yevdokia Bychkova	1955	A Just Russia — For Truth	assumed the mandate	45 — Lipetsk Oblast (№ 2)		
Alexander Romanovic	1952	A Just Russia — For Truth	chosen	46 — Moscow Oblast — Дмитровская, Коломенская, Ногинская (№ 1)		
Tatyana Moskalkova	1955	A Just Russia — For Truth	chosen	47 — Moscow Oblast — Istrinskaya, Khimkinskaya (No. 1)		member of 5th State Duma
Ildar Samiev	1968	A Just Russia — For Truth	assumed the mandate	48 — Moscow Oblast — Lyuberetskaya, Podolskaya, Serpukhovskaya (No. 2)		консультант по экономическим вопросам ООО «Астория»
Anatoly Shein	1956	A Just Russia — For Truth	chosen	50 — Nizhny Novgorod Oblast (№ 4)		
Ilya Ponomarev	1975	A Just Russia — For Truth	chosen	51 — Novosibirsk Oblast (№ 1)		member of 5th State Duma
Yelena Mizulina	1954	A Just Russia — For Truth	chosen	52 — Omsk Oblast (№ 1)		member of 5th State Duma
Sergey Petrov	1954	A Just Russia — For Truth	chosen	53 — Orenburg Oblast (№ 1)		member of 5th State Duma, member of the Committee on Budget and Taxation
Mikhail Emelianov	1962	A Just Russia — For Truth	chosen	55 — Rostov Oblast (№ 1)		member of 5th State Duma
Dzhamaladin Gasanov	1964	A Just Russia — For Truth	chosen	55 — Rostov Oblast (№ 2)		member of 5th State Duma, Deputy Chairman of the Property Committee
Dmitry Gudkov	1980	A Just Russia — For Truth	chosen	56 — Ryazan Oblast, Tambov Oblast (№ 1)		
Adnan Muzykayev	1959	A Just Russia — For Truth	chosen	57 — Samara Oblast (№ 1)		member of 5th State Duma, member of the Foreign Affairs Committee
Vladimir Parakhin	1968	A Just Russia — For Truth	assumed the mandate	58 — Saratov Oblast (№ 2)		Advisor to the chairman of the Management Board of Okhotny Ryad Commercial Bank
Alexander Burkov	1967	A Just Russia — For Truth	chosen	59 — Sverdlovsk Oblast — Kamensk-Uralskaya, Serovskaya, Tsentralnaya (No. 1)		member of 5th State Duma, transport committee member
Valery Chereshnev	1944	A Just Russia — For Truth	chosen	59 — Sverdlovsk Oblast — Kamensk-Uralskaya, Serovskaya, Tsentralnaya (№ 2)		member of 5th State Duma, Member of the Committee on Science and Science-Intensive Technologies
Gennady Nosovko	1975	A Just Russia — For Truth	chosen	60 — Sverdlovsk Oblast — Nizhny Tagilskaya, Pervouralskaya (No. 1)		CEO of Montazh-Stroy LLC
Alexey Kazakov	1977	A Just Russia — For Truth	chosen	61 — Smolensk Oblast (№ 1)		
Igor Zotov	1959	A Just Russia — For Truth	chosen	62 — Tula Oblast (№ 1)		
Valery Gartung	1960	A Just Russia — For Truth	chosen	64 — Chelyabinsk Oblast (№ 1)		member of 5th State Duma, member of the Committee on Budget and Taxation
Vasily Shvetsov	1961	A Just Russia — For Truth	chosen	64 — Chelyabinsk Oblast (№ 2)		
Anatoly Greshnevikov	1956	A Just Russia — For Truth	chosen	65 — Yaroslavl Oblast (№ 1)		member of 5th State Duma, Deputy Chairman of the Committee on Agrarian Issues
Alexander Ageyev	1976	A Just Russia — For Truth	chosen	66 — Moscow — Vostochnaya, Donskaya, Lublinskaya (No. 1)		President of the Charitable Foundation for the Protection and Proper Maintenance of Cultural Heritage Objects
~~Gennady Gudkov~~	1956	A Just Russia — For Truth	chosen	67 — Moscow — Kuntsevskaya, Tsaritsinskaya, Tsentralnaya, Cheremushkinskaya (No. 1)		member of 5th State Duma
Galina Khovanskaya	1943	A Just Russia — For Truth	chosen	68 — Moscow — Medvedkovskaya, Tushinskaya, Sheremetevskaya (No. 1)		
Oleg Nilov	1962	A Just Russia — For Truth	chosen	69 — Saint Petersburg (№ 1)		
Natalia Petukhova	1954	A Just Russia — For Truth	chosen	69 — Saint Petersburg (№ 2)		
Dmitry Ushakov	1980	A Just Russia — For Truth	chosen	69 — Saint Petersburg (№ 3)		
Serdyuk Mikhail	1976	A Just Russia — For Truth	chosen	71 — Khanty-Mansi Autonomous Okrug (№ 1)		
Egor Anisimov	1987	Liberal Democratic Party	chosen	66 — Moscow		
