= Valery Trapeznikov =

Russian politician (born 1947)

- Валерий Трапезников
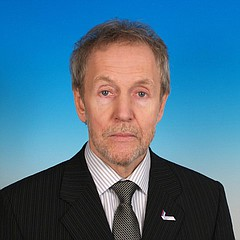

Member of the Legislative Assembly of Perm Krai
- Incumbent
- Assumed office 2016

Member of the State Duma
- In office 21 December 2011 – 2016

Personal details
- Born: Valery Vladimirovich Trapeznikov; 19 March 1947 (age 79) Nytva, Russian SSR, Soviet Union
- Party: United Russia
- Valery Trapeznikov's voice From the Echo of Moscow Program; Recorded 6 May 2012

Valery Vladimirovich Trapeznikov (Russian: Валерий Владимирович Трапезников; born 18 March 1947), is a Russian politician who served as a Member of the 6th convocation of the State Duma. A member of the United Russia party, he had been the member of the Duma Committee on Labor, Social Policy and Veterans Affairs. Before being elected to the State Duma, he was a turner at the Perm plant of JSC Star.

He became famous for his ideas to introduce the title “Hero of Labour of the Russian Federation” and limit the size of golden parachutes for top managers, which were immediately supported by Vladimir Putin.

== Biography ==
Valery Trapeznikov was born on 19 March 1947. He began his career in 1962 as a mechanic at the Perm instrument-making company. From 1964 to 2011 he worked as a turner at the Perm plant of JSC Star. He was actively involved in trade union activities and was the non-exempt chairman of the shop's trade union committee. Often referred to in the press as “a turner with 50 years of experience”.

In October 1999, Trapeznikov was on the list of candidates for deputies of the State Duma of the Russian Federation from the Fatherland – All Russia electoral bloc, but was not elected. In 2011, he was recommended to the State Duma's 6th convocation by the movement “Trade Unions of Russia for Elections”, nominated by the United Russia party, and was elected to the State Duma on 21 December.

In the spring of 2012, public attention was attracted by Trapeznikov's conversation with Aras Agalarov in the radio and television studio of the Komsomolskaya Pravda newspaper, during which the turner energetically convinced the billionaire to share his acquired wealth with the poor.

On 29 March 2013, at a conference of the All-Russia People's Front in Rostov-on-Don, he proposed establishing the title “Hero of Labour of the Russian Federation” and limiting the size of golden parachutes for dismissed top managers. Both proposals were immediately supported by the host of the conference, President Putin, and the decree introducing the honorary title was signed on the same day. Earlier, in August 2012, Presidential Plenipotentiary Envoy in the Ural Federal District Igor Kholmanskikh, spoke about the return of the title “Hero of Labor”, as well as Andrey Isayev, Chairman of the Duma Committee on Labor, and Dmitry Rogozin, Deputy Chairman of the Government for the Defense Industrial Complex, who proposed to also reward the labor collectives of the Defense Industrial Complex.

“My political career has been quite successful,” Trapeznikov said in an interview with journalists in 2012.

In 2016, he lost the United Russia primaries in Perm Krai, but was nominated by the party as part of the party list to the Legislative Assembly of Perm Krai. He was an elected a member of the regional legislative assembly in the same year, at the All-Russia People's Front congress at the end of autumn it was planned to appoint Trapeznikov responsible for the regional branch.

Participating in the XVI Congress of the United Russia party in January 2017, he made a statement about the shortage of blue-collar jobs, people ready and able to work in modern economies.

== Personal life ==
As Trapeznikov himself reported in his declaration, the turner's total income for 2010 amounted to 343 thousand 134 rubles (salary and pension). Trapeznikov has two apartments in the Perm region (67.1 m^{2} - jointly owned and 57.7 m^{2}), a Toyota Avensis. His wife earns 1.5 million rubles a year.

The couple has a daughter and grandchildren.
