= Rizvan Kurbanov =

Russian politician

Rizvan Kurbanov MP
- Ризван Курбанов
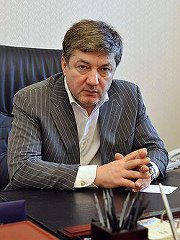

Member of the State Duma (Party List Seat)
- Incumbent
- Assumed office 21 December 2011

Personal details
- Born: 3 January 1961 (age 65) Buynaksk, Dagestan ASSR, Russian SFSR, USSR
- Party: United Russia (2011-2016, from 2021); CPRF (2016-2021)
- Children: 2 (1 son, 1 daughter)
- Education: Dagestan State University; Russian Academy of Public Administration; Russian Legal Academy

Rizvan Daniyalovich Kurbanov (Russian: Ризван Даниялович Курбанов; born 3 January 1961 in Buynaksk, Dagestan ASSR) is a Russian political figure and deputy of the 6th, 7th, and 8th State Dumas.

Kurbanov worked at the Dagestan prosecutor's office first as an investigator then as the deputy prosecutor of the republic. Later he continued his career at the Department of the Ministry of Justice for the Central Federal District. In 2010 he was appointed first vice-president of Dagestan. The next year, he was elected deputy of the 6th State Duma. In 2016 and 2021, he was re-elected for the 7th, and 8th State Dumas. In the Duma, he joined the Committee on Security and Anti-Corruption and Commission for the Investigation of the Interference of Foreign States in the Internal Affairs of Russia

In 2010, Kurbanov was granted a Doctor of Sciences in Juridical sciences degree. However, in 2018 he was accused of plagiarism by professor Alexey Grishkovets who recognized in Kurbanov's work his own dissertation defended in 2004.

== Sanctions ==
He was sanctioned by Canada under the Special Economic Measures Act (S.C. 1992, c. 17) in relation to the Russian invasion of Ukraine for Grave Breach of International Peace and Security, and by the UK government in 2022 in relation to Russo-Ukrainian War.

== Awards ==
- Order of Courage
