= Sergey Krivonosov =

Russian politician

- Сергей Кривоносов
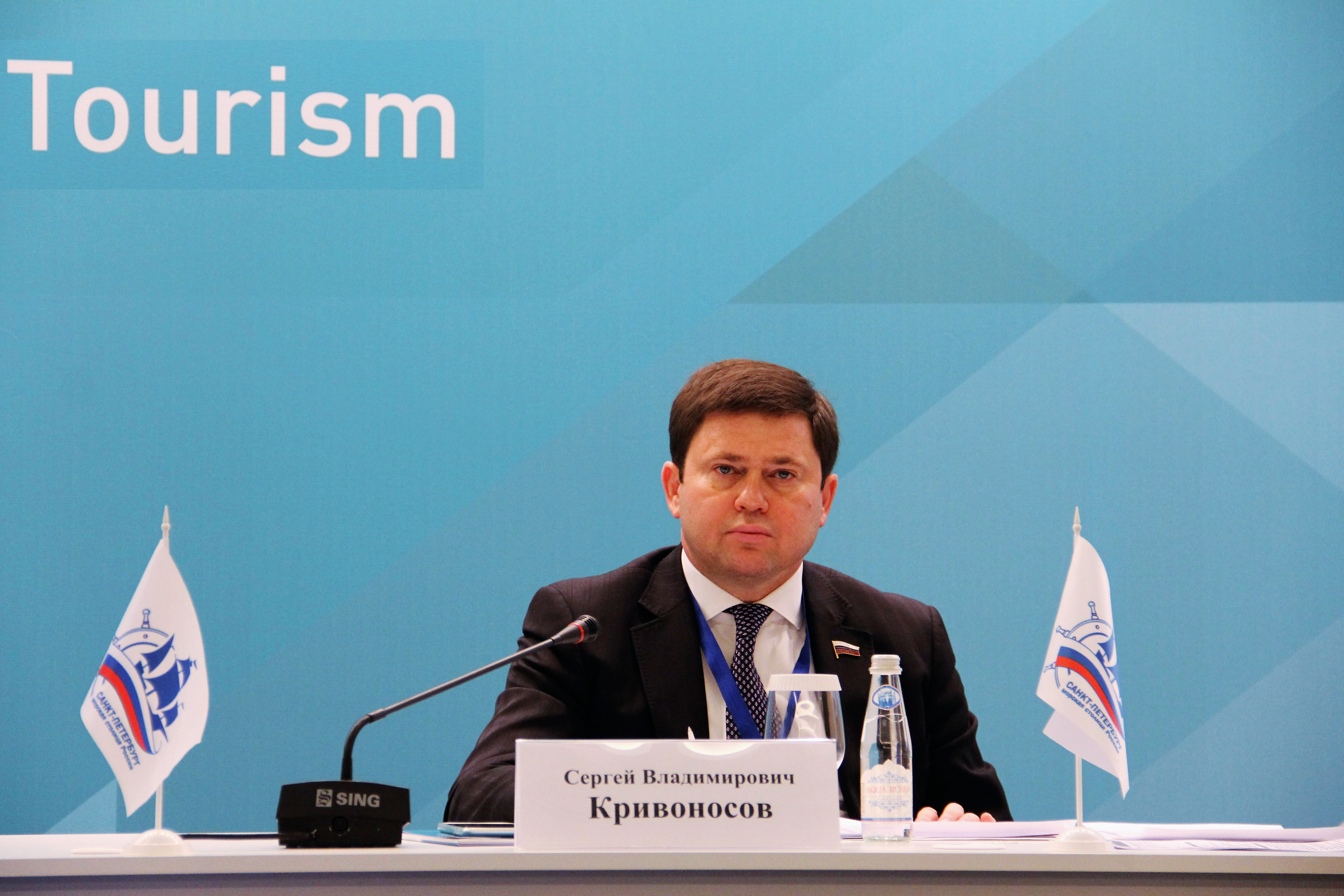

Deputy of the 8th State Duma
- Incumbent
- Assumed office 19 September 2021

Deputy of the 7th State Duma
- In office 5 October 2016 – 12 October 2021

Deputy of the 6th State Duma
- In office 21 December 2011 – 5 October 2016

Personal details
- Born: 29 May 1971 (age 55) Rostov-on-Don, Russian Soviet Federative Socialist Republic, USSR
- Party: United Russia
- Education: Novocherkassk Higher Military Command School of Communications, Moscow State University

Sergei Krivonosov (Russian: Сергей Владимирович Кривоносов; born 29 May 1971, in Rostov-on-Don) is a Russian political figure and deputy of the 6th, 7th, and 8th State Dumas.

In 1992, Krivonosov graduated from the Novocherkassk Higher Military Command School of Communications. From 1991 to 1994, he served at the Northwestern Group of Forces in Tallinn and headed the communications platoon. After being transferred to the reserve, Krivonosov engaged in investment in the Black Sea coast tourism. For the next 15 years, he headed several commercial organizations. In 2002, Krivonosov joined the United Russia. In 2011, he became a deputy of the 6th State Duma. He was re-elected for the 7th and 8th State Dumas. In the Duma, Krivonosov works as Deputy Chairman of the Committee for Tourism and Development of Tourism Infrastructure.

In 2017, Krivonosov became the wealthiest among deputies from the Krasnodar Krai constituency with a monthly income of 4.2 million rubles.

== Sanctions ==
He was sanctioned by the UK government in 2022 in relation to the Russo-Ukrainian War.

On 24 March 2022, the United States Treasury sanctioned him in response to the 2022 Russian invasion of Ukraine.
