= Alexander Abalakov =

Russian politician (born 1959)

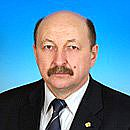
- Russian politician

Member of the State Duma of the Russian Federation
- Incumbent
- Assumed office 4 December 2011

Personal details
- Born: November 29, 1959 (age 66) Zalesovo, Altai Krai, Russian SFSR, Soviet Union
- Party: Communist Party of the Russian Federation
- Education: Novosibirsk Electrotechnical Institute

Alexander Nikolayevich Abalakov (Russian: Алекса́ндр Никола́евич Абала́ков; born 29 November 1959) is a Russian politician and member of the State Duma of the Russian Federation for the Communist Party of the Russian Federation.

== Early life and education ==
Alexander Abalakov was born on 29 November 1959 in the village of Zalesovo, Altai Krai, Russian SFSR, Soviet Union. In 1977, he enrolled Novosibirsk Electrotechnical Institute, from which he graduated with honors in 1982 as a certified electrical engineer with a degree in Information and Measuring Technology.

== Career ==
In 1979, he began his career as a laboratory assistant in the research sector. He worked at his occupation in nuclear and tool-making industry from 1982 to 1989. In 1989, he, with the help of his companions, established and took over a cooperative, which is the ancestor of today's F1 Business Group.

In December 2005, he was elected deputy of the Novosibirsk Regional Council of Deputies. Before 2010, he served on the Committee for Construction, Housing and Communal Services.

On 4 December 2011, he became deputy of the 6th State Duma of the Russian Federation, having been elected in the 2011 parliamentary election as part of the federal list of candidates nominated by the Communist Party of the Russian Federation for Novosibirsk Oblast.

He is a member of the State Duma Committee on Housing Policy and Housing and Communal Services.
