= Vladimir Gutenev =

Russian politician (born 1966)

Vladimir Gutenev MP
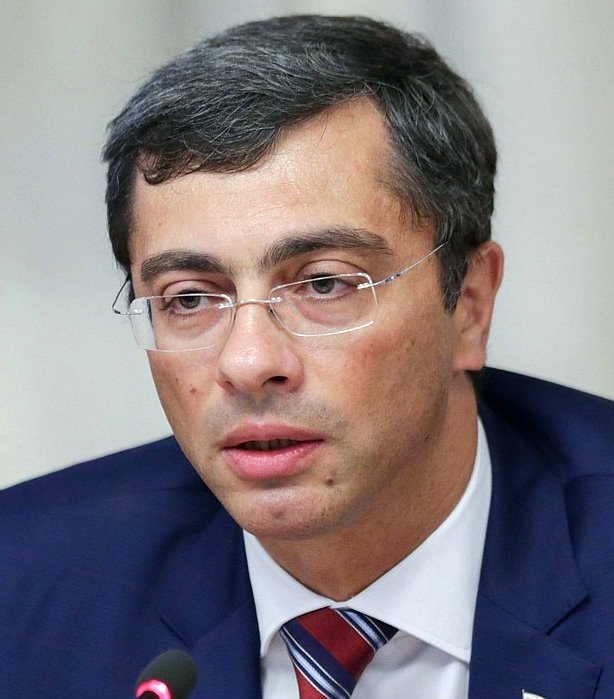

Chairman of the State Duma committee of the on industry and trade
- Incumbent
- Assumed office 12 October 2021
- Preceded by: position has been established

Deputy of the State Duma Russia
- Incumbent
- Assumed office 21 December 2011
- Constituency: Party List

Personal details
- Born: 27 March 1966 (age 60) Tambov, RSFSR, USSR
- Party: United Russia
- Education: Novocherkassk State Reclamation Academy
- Awards: Order of Friendship; Order of Alexander Nevsky
- Website: gutenev-duma.ru (in Russian)

Vladimir Vladimirovich Gutenev (born 27 March 1966) is a Russian politician. Chairman of the State Duma Russia committee of the on industry and trade from 12 October 2021.

Deputy of the State Duma of the Russian Federation.

== Biografy ==
In 1990, he graduated from the Novocherkassk Engineering and Land-reclamation Institute and in 2004 he became a Doctor of Technical Sciences. From 2001 to 2009, he was a Professor in the Social and Environmental Systems Management Department at the Russian Academy of Public Administration under the President of the Russian Federation. Between 2007-2009, Gutenev held the position of an Advisor to the General Director of the Rosoboronexport State Corporation.

On 4 December 2011, Gutenev was elected as a Deputy of 6th State Duma. He was re-elected in 2016 and 2021 for the 7th State Duma and 8th State Duma respectively.

== Biography ==
- In 1990 graduated from Novocherkassk engineering and reclamation Institute. Since 1999 — candidate of technical Sciences. Since 2004 — doctor of technical Sciences. Until 2001, was engaged in scientific and teaching activities, worked in commercial organizations.
- 2001-2009-Professor of the Department of management of social and environmental systems of the Russian Academy of public administration under the President of the Russian Federation.
- 2007-2009-assistant to the General Director of Rosoboronexport. 2009-2011-Advisor to the General Director of the state Corporation "Russian technologies".
- On 4 December 2011 he was elected to the state Duma of the sixth convocation from the political party "United Russia". First Deputy Chairman of the state Duma Committee on industry.
- On 18 September 2016, he was re-elected to the state Duma of the seventh convocation. Again passed on the lists of the party "United Russia".
- Deputy Chairman of the Central audit Commission of the, coordinator of the center for public monitoring of the All-Russia People's Fronton ecology and forest protection, first Vice-President of the Union of machine builders of Russia, President of The Association "League of assistance to defense enterprises".
- On 10 October 2016, Kommersant distributed information about the possible resignation of the Governor of the Samara region Nikolai Merkushkin, who distributed other publications, naming Vladimir Gutenev as his successor.
- In 2018, as a Deputy in The state Duma voted to raise the retirement age

== Legislative activity ==
- From 2011 to 2019, during his term in the state Duma of VI and VII convocations, he co-authored 180 legislative initiatives and amendments to draft Federal laws.

== Scientific activity ==
- In 2003-the State Prize of the Russian Federation for closed work in the interests of the Ministry of defense of the Russian Federation for the creation of a new type of weapons and equipment.
- In 2010-the Prize of the government of the Russian Federation in the field of education for the creation of a cycle of textbooks and training programs.
- In 2012, the Prize of the government of the Russian Federation in the field of science and technology.
- Author of more than 315 scientific and educational works, including 59 patents for inventions of the Russian Federation, 48 textbooks, manuals and monographs (9 textbooks by the Ministry of defense of the Russian Federation). Two textbooks have been translated into Chinese and published in China.

From 2006-2013-expert of the Higher attestation Commission.

== Public activity ==
- By the decree of the President of the Russian Federation he was twice (2008-2010 and 2010-2012) a member of the Public chamber of the Russian Federation of the second and third convocations, created and headed The Commission of the Public chamber for the modernization of industry (resigned early in connection with the election to the State Duma of the Russian Federation).
- From 2010-2011-Chairman of the Public Council under the Ministry of industry and trade of the Russian Federation.
- In 2012, by the decree of the President of the Russian Federation included in the State Commission on chemical disarmament.
- In 2012, by the decree of the President of the Russian Federation included in the Commission for the development of General aviation.
- Coordinator of the parliamentary Deputy friendship group "Russia-Switzerland" .

== Sanctions ==
In December 2022 the EU sanctioned Vladimir Gutenev in relation to the 2022 Russian invasion of Ukraine.

== Rewards ==
- In 2018, by the decree of the President of the Russian Federation awarded the Order of Alexander Nevsky.
- In 2011, by the decree of the President of the Russian Federation awarded the Order of Friendship.
- In 2016-honorary diploma of the President of the Russian Federation.
- In 2017 — Gratitude of the President of the Russian Federation.
- In 2018-a letter of gratitude from the President of the Russian Federation.
- In 2016 — diploma of the State Duma of the Federal Assembly of the Russian Federation.
- In 2016-the Badge of the Ministry of industry and trade of the Russian Federation "Medal named after the designer of small arms M. T. Kalashnikov".
- In 2015-the Badge of the Russian foreign Ministry "for cooperation".
- In 2018-a Memorial sign of the Director of the FSVTS of Russia for special merits in solving the problems of military-technical cooperation of the Russian Federation.
- In 2019, the FSMTC of Russia Medal "For distinction".
- In 2019 — Medal "for the Commonwealth in the field of chemical disarmament" .
- In 2013 — a badge of distinction, a medal of FMBA of Russia "for assistance to donor movement".
- In 2019 — Medal of FMBA of Russia "for contribution to science".
- In 2011 — Medal of the Federal service for environmental, technological and nuclear supervision "290 years of Federal service".
- In 2013 — Medal of the Federal service for environmental, technological and nuclear supervision "for merits in safety".
- In 2014 — Medal of the Federal service for environmental, technological and nuclear supervision "295 years of Federal service".
- Awarded nominal weapons.
