= Vladimir Pligin =

Russian politician, businessman, and lawyer

- Владимир Плигин
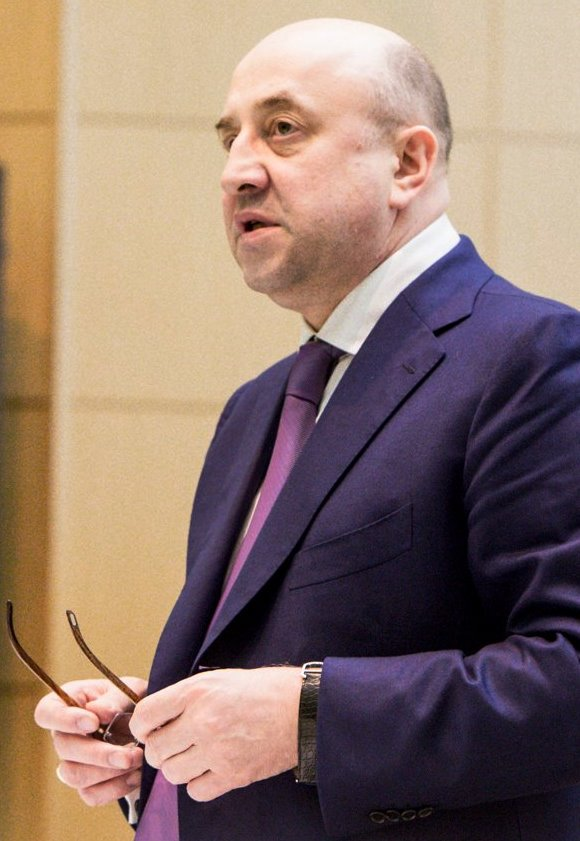

Member of Parliament in the State Duma
- In office 7 December 2003 – 2016

Personal details
- Born: Vladimir Nikolayevich Pligin; 19 May 1960 (age 66) Ignatovo, Vologda Oblast, Soviet Union
- Party: United Russia
- Spouse: Nina Aleksandrovna

Vladimir Nikolayevich Pligin (Russian: Владимир Николаевич Плигин; born 19 May 1960), is a Russian politician, businessman, and lawyer, who had been a member of parliament, a deputy of the State Duma of the fourth, fifth and sixth convocations from the United Russia party.

He had been the chairman of the State Duma Committee on Constitutional Legislation and State Building of the State Duma of the IV-VI convocations.

He is an honored lawyer of Russia as of 2011.

He is also one of the authors of the Legal Encyclopedia in 2001.

== Biography ==
Vladimir Pligin was born on 19 May 1960 in the village of Ignatovo, Vologda Oblast. After graduating from school, he came to Leningrad and entered the law faculty of the Leningrad State University (LSU) named after. A. A. Zhdanova. In his student years, he met Dmitry Kozak and Yury Volkov, who studied with him at the same faculty. He graduated from the university in 1982, with a diploma with honors. He defended his thesis under Anatoly Sobchak. He entered the graduate school of Leningrad State University, which he did not finish, since working on his Ph.D. thesis seemed to him a "boring task".

=== Entrepreneurship and advocacy ===
In the early 1990s, Pligin and Boguslavsky created the law firm Yust LLP, according to Pligin, “the most successful and serious legal business in Russia.

In 1996, Pligin received the status of a lawyer in the Moscow Regional Bar Association. Pligin was engaged in criminal trials, the defendants of which were well-known politicians. Particularly, representatives of Yust defended the former head of the KGB of the USSR Vladimir Kryuchkov, the former chairman of the legislative assembly of St. Petersburg Yuri Kravtsov, businessman Boris Berezovsky, and Sobchak. He participated in the process between the Aeroflot airline and the Swiss company Andava, in which Berezovsky was the main shareholder.

== Political activity ==
On 7 December 2003, Pligin was elected to the State Duma, becoming a member of the United Russia faction, and was the chairman of the State Duma Committee on constitutional legislation and state building. On 2 December 2007, he was re-elected as member of the State Duma of the fifth convocation as part of the federal list of candidates put forward by the All-Russian political party United Russia, and became chairman of the same committee.

He was a member of the General Council of the United Russia WFP, later joined the Supreme Council of United Russia, and was an author of a number of articles and books, co-author of the textbook "State Property Management".

In 2010, he took second place in the rating of deputies-lobbyists of the Russian edition of Forbes magazine.

On 12 May 2014, Pligin was included by the European Union in the "sanctions list" of persons whose assets are frozen in the EU and for whom visa restrictions have been introduced.

In the 2016 Russian parliamentary elections, Pligin took fifth place in the United Russia territorial group for Saint Petersburg. Due to the low turnout from the group, only two mandates were delegated to the State Duma, Pligin could retain a seat in parliament only if the mandate of Prime Minister Dmitry Medvedev was transferred. He left the State Duma by the end of the year.

In 2017, he became an advisor to the Chairman of the State Duma, and was a member of the Russian Analytical Committee.

In January 2019, he has been appointed a deputy chairman of the Commission of the Presidium of the General Council of the United Arab Emirates for international activities.

By the decision of the VII Congress of the Association of Lawyers of Russia, which took place on December 3, 2019, in Moscow, Pligin, a leading researcher at the Institute of State and Law of the Russian Academy of Sciences, was elected Chairman of the Association of Lawyers of Russia for the next term of office.

=== Sanctions ===
He was sanctioned by the UK government in 2014 in relation to the Russo-Ukrainian War.

== Legislative initiatives ==
With the direct participation of Pligin, the State Duma in 2003-2014 adopted laws providing for:

- replacement of benefits with cash compensation;
- tougher punishment for violation of traffic rules;
- the abolition of direct elections of heads of regions;
- the transition to the election of deputies of the State Duma exclusively on party lists, the abolition of the election of half of the deputies in single-mandate constituencies;
- the "Rotenberg law", which provided for the compensation of property seized abroad to Russian citizens at the expense of the budget
- tightening state control over the activities of non-profit organizations;
- the abolition of the lower threshold for voter turnout;
- introduction of a ban on voting “against all”;
- raising the threshold for parties in the elections of deputies of the State Duma to 7%;
- tightening party legislation;
- prohibition in any form to participate in elections, including election observation, for NPOs (“foreign agents”);
- liquidation of the Supreme Arbitration Court of the Russia.

== Personal life ==
=== Family ===
Pligin is married to his wife, Nina Aleksandrovna, who is a graduate of the Faculty of Chemistry of the Leningrad State University, and a specialist in the field of rocket fuel. The Pligins have two sons, the elder Aleksandr and Andrey, a younger son.

==== Information about income and property ====
According to the official declaration, Pligin and his wife received an income of 8.5 million rubles in 2011. His wife, Nina Aleksandrovna, own 3 land plots with a total area of 3.55 thousand square meters, two residential buildings, two apartments, an “object in a country house” and an Audi car.

As of 2007, Pligin owned shares in several companies - 100% in Yus-Energo LLC, 25% in Yust-Office LLC, 20% in Yust LLC and 14.3% in Reservtrastcom LLC. According to the Kommersant newspaper, in 2007 Pligin also owned a plot of 25 hectares in the village of Barvikha near Moscow (area of the so-called Rublyovka). The deputy planned to build an elite village on this site, but the development project was not implemented, and in May 2012 the site was put up for sale by Sberbank with a starting price of 7.224 billion rubles, to which Pligin's firms owed more than $170 million.

According to the Vedomosti newspaper, in Bulgaria, Pligin owns a home ownership with a total area of 171 m^{2} and a land plot of 500 m^{2}.
