= Alexander Remezkov =

Russian politician

Alexander Remezkov MP
- Александр Ремезков
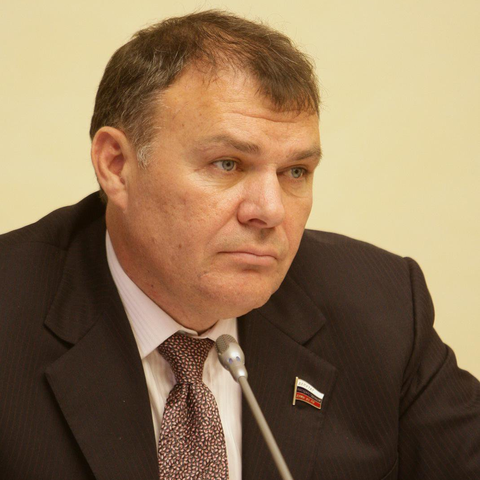

Member of the State Duma (Party List Seat)
- Incumbent
- Assumed office 21 December 2011

Personal details
- Born: 7 April 1962 (age 63) Urgench, Khorazm Region, Uzbek SSR, Soviet Union
- Party: A Just Russia — For Truth
- Education: Volgograd Civil Engineering Institute; Taganrog State Radioengineering University; Kuban State Agrarian University (DPhil)
- Occupation: Professor

Alexander Alexandrovich Remezkov (Russian: Александр Александрович Ремезков; born 7 April 1962 in Urgench, Xorazm Region) is a Russian political figure and a deputy of the 6th, 7th, and 8th State Dumas.

At the beginning of the 1990s, Remezkov engaged in business. From 1994 to 1998, he worked as financial director of the enterprise Association Eksim. In 1998, he was elected deputy of the Legislative Assembly of Krasnodar Krai. In 2001, he was appointed head of the administration of Krasnodar Krai. In 2002-2008, he was the Vice Governor of the Krasnodar Krai Alexander Tkachev. In 2008, he headed the Krasnodar regional branch of the Russian Union of Industrialists and Entrepreneurs. From 2011 to 2016, he served as deputy of the 6th State Duma from the Krasnodar Krai constituency. In 2016 and 2021, he was re-elected deputy of the 7th and 8th State Dumas.

== Sanctions ==
He was sanctioned by the UK government in 2022 in relation to the Russo-Ukrainian War.
