= Alexander Starovoitov =

Russian politician

- Александр Старовойтов
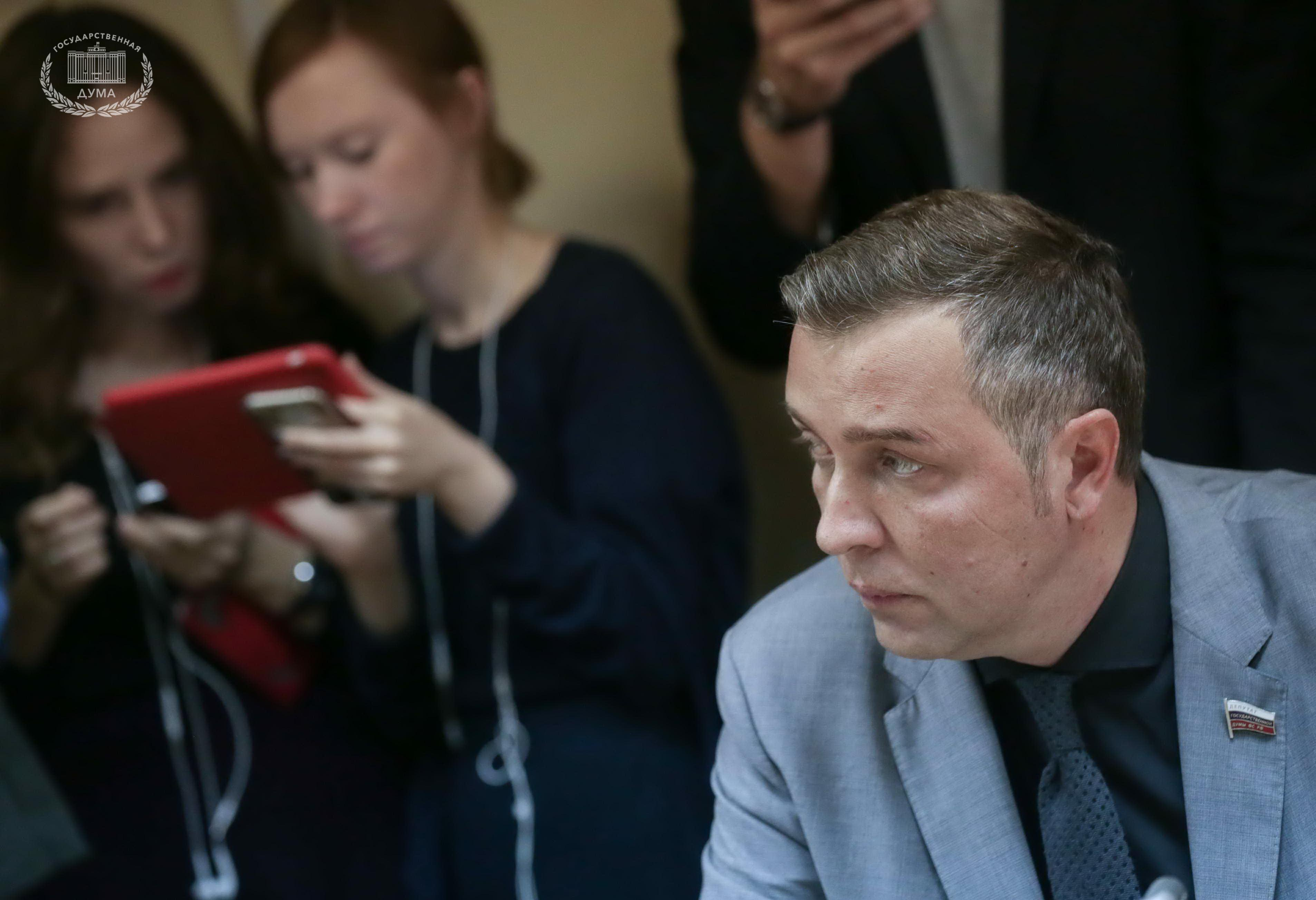
- Staravoitov in 2017

Deputy of the State Duma
- In office 4 December 2011 – 12 October 2021

Personal details
- Born: Aleksandr Sergeyevich Starovoitov; 28 January 1972 (age 54) Balashikha, Moscow Oblast, Soviet Union
- Party: Liberal Democratic Party of Russia
- Children: 2

Aleksandr Sergeyevich Starovoitov (Russian: Александр Сергеевич Старовойтов; born 28 January 1972), is a Russian social and political figure. He was a deputy of the State Duma of the sixth and seventh convocations from the Liberal Democratic Party of Russia.

== Biography ==
Aleksandr Starovoitov was born in Balashikha, Moscow Oblast on 28 January 1972. In 1997, he graduated from the faculty of counterintelligence of the FSB Academy as a lawyer with knowledge of Japanese. He served in the Unit for Combating Illegal Armed Forces and Banditry of the Federal Security Service Directorate of the Russian Federation in Moscow and Moscow Oblast. From the beginning of the 2000s, he worked in various managerial positions in large commercial structures. In 2007, he was invited to work in the Central Office of the Liberal Democratic Party of Russia.

From 2008 to 2009 Starovoitov was the head of the LDPR of Moscow Oblast. Since July 2009, by personal order of Vladimir Zhirinovsky, he was seconded to Astrakhan to head the Astrakhan regional branch of the LDPR. On 14 March 2010, Starovoitov was elected as a deputy of the Astrakhan City Council. On 4 December 2011, he was elected as a deputy of the State Duma of the VI convocation from the LDPR. In 2013, he graduated from the Russian Presidential Academy of National Economy and Public Administration with the degree of Sociology of Management.

On 18 September 2016 Starovoitov was elected to the State Duma of the 7th convocation according to the federal list of the LDPR (No. 1 in the regional group No. 51, Belgorod Oblast). He is a single father of two children.

== Controversy ==
On 30 April 2015, Starovoitov complained that Apple Inc. and the Irish pop rock band U2 had "spammed youths with illegal content" with the distribution of their album, Songs of Innocence. He asked the Prosecutor-General of Russia to investigate the distribution of gay propaganda. Starovoitov also claimed the album art promotes sex between men.
