= Viktor Pinsky =

Russian politician

Viktor Pinsky MP
- Виктор Пинский
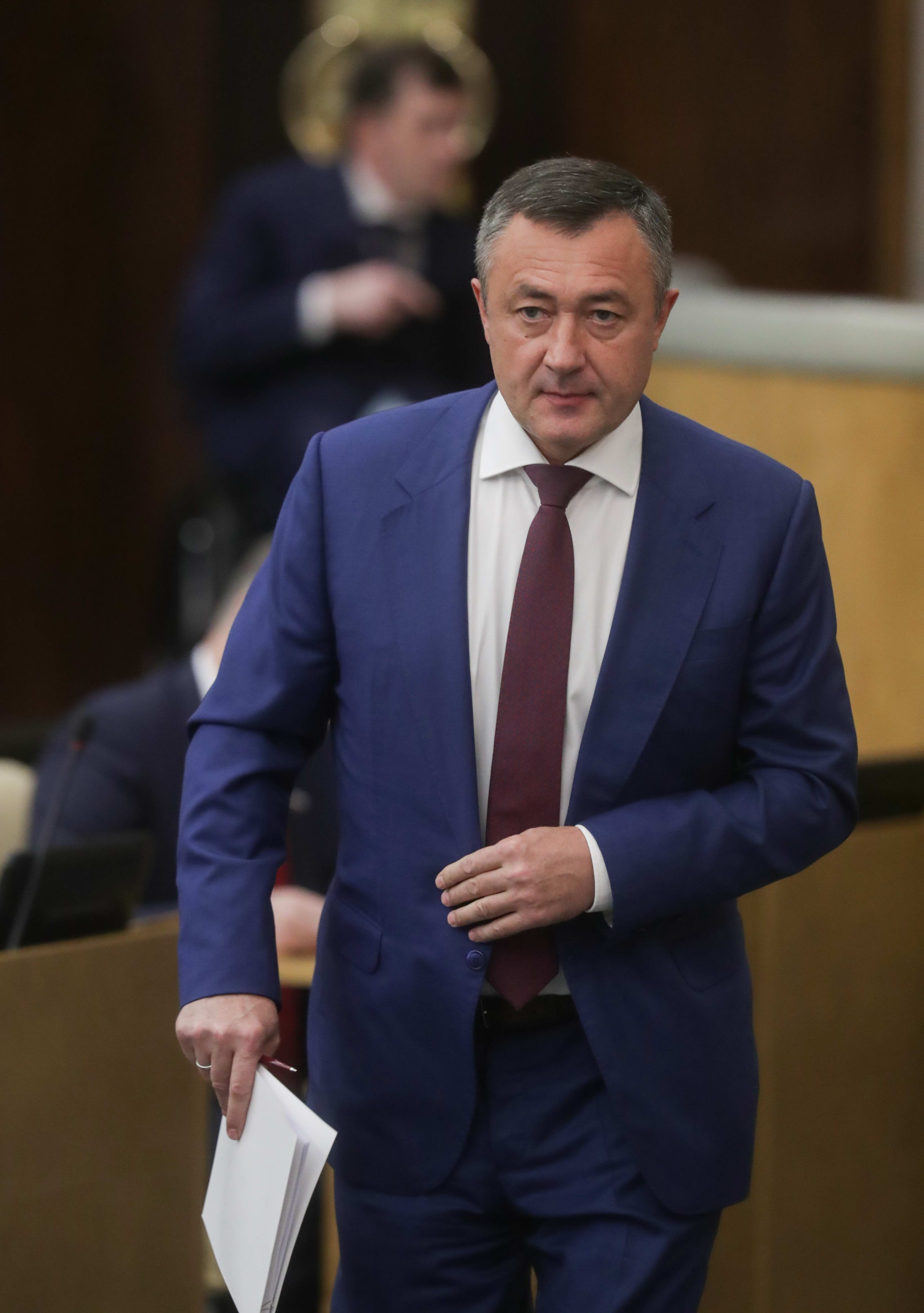

Member of the State Duma (Party List Seat)
- Incumbent
- Assumed office 21 December 2011

Personal details
- Born: 6 February 1964 (age 62) Lida, Grodno Region, Byelorussian SSR, USSR
- Party: United Russia
- Education: Military Institute of the USSR Ministry of Defense

Viktor Vitalievich Pinsky (Russian: Виктор Витальевич Пинский; born February 6, 1964, Lida, Grodno Region) is a Russian political figure and a deputy of the 6th, 7th, and 8th State Dumas.

From 1987 to 1989, he was the head of the office of the military court of Petropavlovsk-Kamchatsky. Then, until 1996, he served as a judge of the military court of the city of Fokino, Primorsky Krai. From 2000 to 2005, Pinsky was the deputy of the Legislative Assembly of Primorsky Krai. In 2011, he was elected deputy of the 6th State Duma from the Primorsky Krai constituency. In 2016 and 2021, he was re-elected for the 7th and 8th State Dumas, respectively.

At the State Duma, Pinsky voted for the scandalous Dima Yakovlev Law, Yarovaya law, for increasing the pension age, and other laws that are popularly known as "anti-national".

== Sanctions ==
He was sanctioned by the UK government in 2022 in relation to the Russo-Ukrainian War.
