= Yury Sinelshchikov =

Russian politician

Yury Sinelshchikov MP
- Юрий Синельщиков
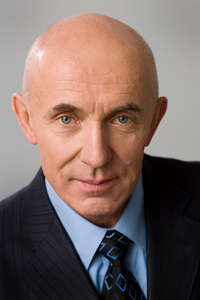

Member of the State Duma (Party List Seat)
- Incumbent
- Assumed office 21 December 2011

Personal details
- Born: 26 September 1947 (age 78) Bogucharovo, Aleksinsky District, Tula Oblast, RSFSR, USSR
- Party: Communist Party of the Russian Federation
- Education: Kharkov Law Institute

Yury Petrovich Sinelshchikov (Russian: Юрий Петрович Синельщиков; born 26 September 1947, Bogucharovo, Aleksinsky District) is a Russian political figure, and a deputy of the 6th State Duma, 7th and 8th State Dumas.

From 1966 to 1969, Sinelshchikov served at the Group of Soviet Forces in Germany. He took part in the Warsaw Pact invasion of Czechoslovakia. After graduating from the Yaroslav Mudryi National Law University, Sinelshchikov was appointed to the prosecutor's office of the Oryol region, where he worked as a prosecutor. In 1987, he started working at the prosecutor's office in the Tushino district. In 1994, he was appointed Deputy Prosecutor of Moscow. From 1995 to 2003, he was the First Deputy Prosecutor of Moscow. In 2004, he was appointed Associate Professor of the Department of Criminal Law Disciplines of the Moscow State Pedagogical University. On 4 December 2011 he was elected deputy of the 6th State Duma. In 2016 and 2021, he was re-elected deputy of the 7th and 8th State Dumas from the Ulyanovsk Oblast constituency.

== Sanctions ==
He was sanctioned by the UK government in 2022 in relation to the Russo-Ukrainian War.
