= Lyudmila Shvetsova =

Russian politician (1949–2014)

- Людмила Швецова
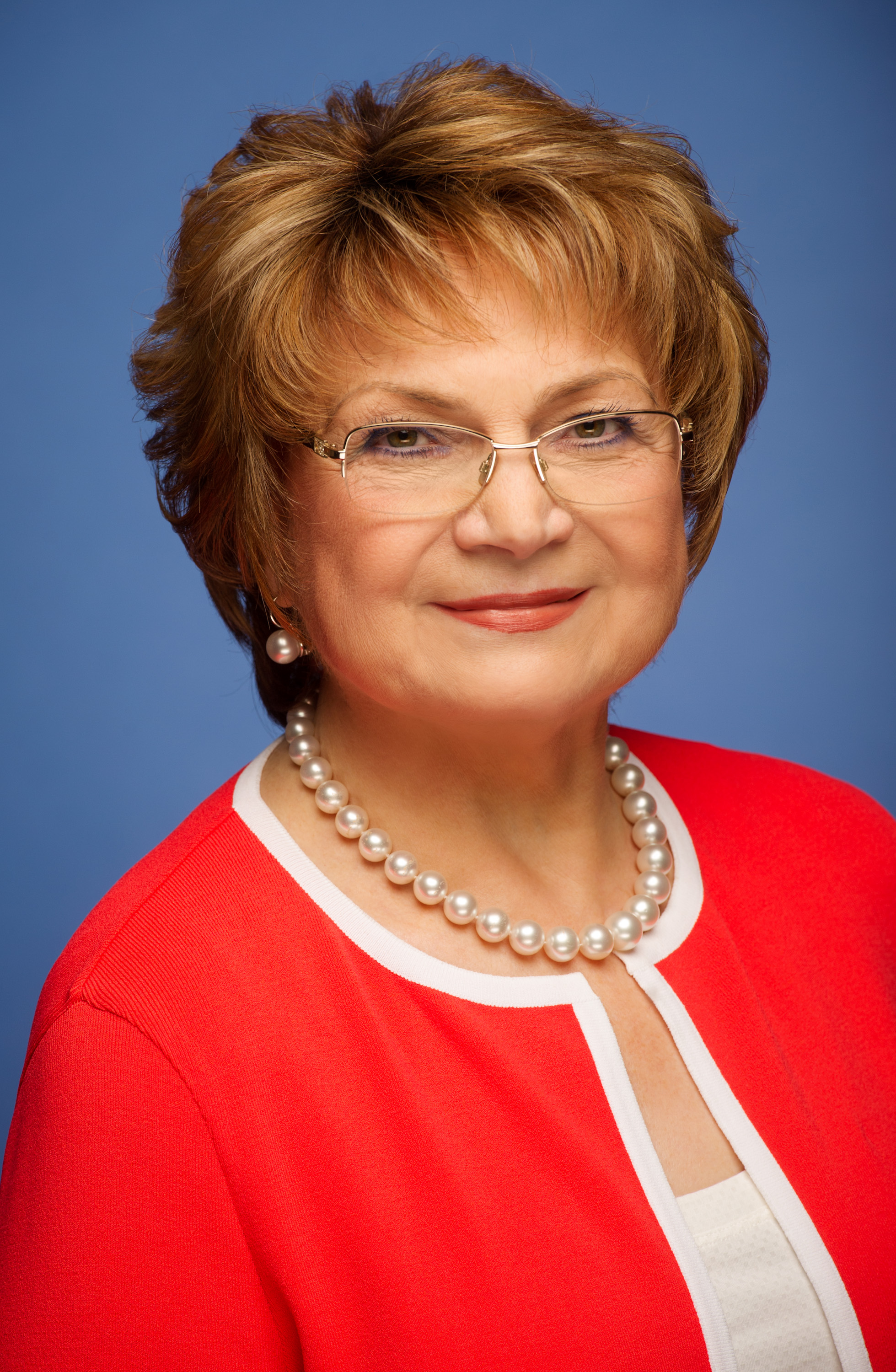
- Shvetsova in 2013

Deputy Chairman of the State Duma
- In office 21 December 2011 – 29 October 2014
- Chairman: Sergey Naryshkin

Deputy Mayor of Moscow on social policy
- In office 21 January 2000 – 12 December 2011
- Mayor: Yury Luzhkov; Sergey Sobyanin
- Succeeded by: Olga Golodets

Secretary of the Komsomol Central Committee — Chairman of the Young Pioneers Central Council
- In office 18 May 1984 – 12 April 1986
- Preceded by: Alevtina Fedulova
- Succeeded by: Igor Nikitin

Personal details
- Born: Lyudmila Ivanovna Odintsova; 24 September 1949 Alma-Ata, Kazakh SSR, Soviet Union
- Died: 29 October 2014 (aged 65) Moscow, Russia
- Resting place: Troyekurovskoye Cemetery
- Party: United Russia
- Education: Kharkov Aviation Institute

Lyudmila Ivanovna Shvetsova (Russian: Людмила Ивановна Швецова; 24 September 1949 – 29 October 2014) was a Russian stateswoman and politician.

She had served as the deputy Chairman of the State Duma of the VI convocation from United Russia from 21 December 2011 to 29 October 2014.

Previously, she was the Deputy Mayor of Moscow from 2000 to 2011. She was also the chairman of the Central Council of the Vladimir Lenin All-Union Pioneer Organization at the Central Committee of the Komsomol from 1983 to 1986.

She was the president of the all-Russian public organization "Knowledge" Society of Russia, a candidate of political sciences, a professor, and the head of the Department of Gender Studies (theory of "women's equality and leadership") of the Russian State University for the Humanities.

== Biography ==
Lydumila Odinstova was born on 24 September 1949 in Alma-Ata in the Kazakh Soviet Socialist Republic. Her father, Ivan Vasilyevich (1922-2002), was a soldier, who served in the Great Patriotic War, and was awarded many state awards. Her mother, Vera Grigorievna, (22 June 1922 - 11 January 1972), was an English teacher.

In 1967, she graduated from the Physics and Mathematics School in Rostov-on-Don with a silver medal. During her school years, she worked as an announcer for children's pioneer television programs, for which the Rostov Regional Committee of the CPSU gave her a referral to enter the Moscow State Institute of International Relations, as well as a theater school. However, she did not use these directions and in 1967 she entered the Kharkiv Aviation Institute, which she graduated in 1973 with a degree in mechanical engineering in aircraft construction.

After graduating from the institute, Shvetsova began working as a designer at the Antonov Design Bureau, but she worked in her specialty for only two years, already in 1975, where she switched to Komsomol work, becoming the secretary of the Leningrad district committee of the Komsomol of Kyiv. Later, Shvetsova became the head of the department of scientific youth, the secretary of the Central Committee of the Komsomol of Ukraine.

From 1983 to 1986, Shevtsova was Secretary of the Central Committee of the Komsomol, Chairman of the Central Council of the All-Union Pioneer Organization. As the secretary of the Central Committee of the Komsomol, Shvetsova was engaged not only in working with children's and youth organizations, pedagogical associations, but also oversaw the activities of the All-Union Student Construction Team (VSSO) and participated in solving the problems of the newly emerging, similar to the VSSO, KMSO units of the Youth Residential Complex movement. Shvetsova also took part in the organization of the 1980 Summer Olympics in Moscow and the World Festival of Youth and Students in 1985, for which she was awarded high state awards - the Order of the Badge of Honour in 1981, and the Order of the Red Banner of Labour in 1986.

From 1996 to 1991, she worked in the secretariat of the apparatus of the Supreme Soviet of the Soviet Union, the Congress of People's Deputies of the Soviet Union, in which she headed the awards department since 1989, since 1990, she was appointed head of the apparatus.

From 1991 to 1992, she was the Chairman of the Committee on Family and Women's Affairs under the Cabinet of Ministers of the Soviet Union.

She was a member of the Central Auditing Commission of the Communist Party of the Soviet Union between 1986 and 1990, and a member of the Central Committee of the Communist Party of the Soviet Union from 1990 to 1991.

From 1992 to 1993, she was the head of the general expertise group at the Supreme Economic Council of the Supreme Soviet of Russia. In the same year, she was elected president of the Women's Initiative Foundation, and a year later she became vice-president of the Atlantis Information and Publishing Commonwealth and co-chairman of the Women's League Confederation. For some time, Shvetsova worked in a commercial structure, where she was a public relations advisor.

In April 1994, Shvetsova was appointed head of the Department of Public and Interregional Relations of the Moscow City Government, led by Yury Luzhkov.

Shvetsova completed her postgraduate studies at the Russian State Social University, in 1997 and defended her dissertation “Integration of Women into Politics. 1970-1990s "for the degree of candidate of political sciences.

From 1998 to 2002, a being a subordinate to Luzhkov, she was a member of his political movement Fatherland.

On 21 January 2000, Luzhkov appointed Shvetsova to the post of the first deputy mayor of Moscow, as the head of the social sphere complex.

In October 2009, together with Luzhkov, she took part in the election of deputies to the Moscow City Duma from United Russia, but she refused the deputy mandate she received, as well as Luzhkov.

After on 8 September 2010, when Russian President Dmitry Medvedev dismissed Luzhkov due to the loss of confidence, and all members of the city government, including Shvetsova, were also dismissed, retaining their powers until the appointment of a new government capital cities. In October of the same year, the United Russia party presented the head of state with a list of candidates for the post of mayor of Moscow, which included Sergey Sobyanin, Igor Levitin, Valery Shantsev and Shvetsova herself.

On 12 October 2010, Sobyanin, who was supported by the absolute majority of the Moscow City Duma deputies, officially took office as Mayor of Moscow. In the same month, a new government was formed, in which Shvetsova continued to fulfill the duties of responsible for the social block, but already in the post of deputy mayor of Moscow.

In the fall of 2011, Shvetsova entered the Moscow party list of United Russia in the elections to the State Duma.

On 4 December 2011, she was elected a member of parliament, a deputy of the State Duma of the VI convocation.

On 12 December 2011, Shvetsova and First Deputy Mayor of Moscow Vladimir Resin were dismissed in connection with their transfer to work in the State Duma.

On 21 December, at the first meeting of the new Duma, she was appointed vice speaker. As Deputy Chairman of the State Duma, he supervises the State Duma Committee on Labor, Social Policy and Veterans Affairs, the State Duma Committee on Education, the State Duma Committee on Family, Women and Children, the State Duma Committee on Culture and the State Duma Committee on Public Associations and Religious Organizations.

In May 2013, Shvetsova was elected co-chair of the National Parents' Association.

At the 2013 Moscow mayoral elections, she was the head of the election headquarters of the acting Mayor of Moscow, Sobyanin.

Shvetsova was the President of the Association of Researchers of Child Movement since 1991, and was a member of the executive committee of the International Women's Forum. In October 2011. she was elected vice-president of the International Women's Forum, and in October 2013, she was president of the IWF. He is the author of numerous publications in newspapers and magazines on the problems of children, youth, women's movement, social policy.

On 28 March 2013, at the XV Congress she was elected President of the All-Russian public organization "Knowledge" Society of Russia. In the summer of 2013, she joined the Board of Trustees of the Peace and Love Charitable Foundation.

On 29 April 2014, she was sanctioned by the European Union. She was removed from the EU sanctions list after her death on 29 October 2014, when Shvetsova died in Moscow, at night, at the age of 65. The vacated mandate of the State Duma deputy passed to Nikolay Antoshkin.

The funeral service was held at the House of Unions, as the ceremony cost the Moscow government 4 million rubles. She was buried at the Troyekurovskoye Cemetery.

== Family ==
She was married to Anatoly Andreyevich (1949-1994). She had a son, Aleksey (1978-2004).

== Income ==
According to the declaration for 2009, Shvetsova's income amounted to 7.43 million rubles. She owned two land plots (15 and 20 acres), an apartment, a house and a utility room, as well as two cars. Shvetsova's income for 2011 amounted to 11.5 million rubles.

== See also ==
- List of members of the State Duma of Russia who died in office
