= Ignatovo, Vologodsky District, Vologda Oblast =

Ignatovo Игнатово
- Village
- Location within Vologda Oblast Location within Russia
- Coordinates: 59°11′N 39°16′E
- Country: Russia
- Region: Vologda Oblast
- District: Vologodsky District
- Time zone: UTC+3:00

Ignatovo (Russian: Игнатово) is a rural locality (a village) in Staroselskoye Rural Settlement, Vologodsky District, Vologda Oblast, Russia. The population was 15 as of 2002.

== Geography ==
Ignatovo is located 42 km west of Vologda (the district's administrative centre) by road. Striznevo is the nearest rural locality.
