= Igor Ananskikh =

Russian politician (born 1966)

Igor Ananskikh MP
- Игорь Ананских
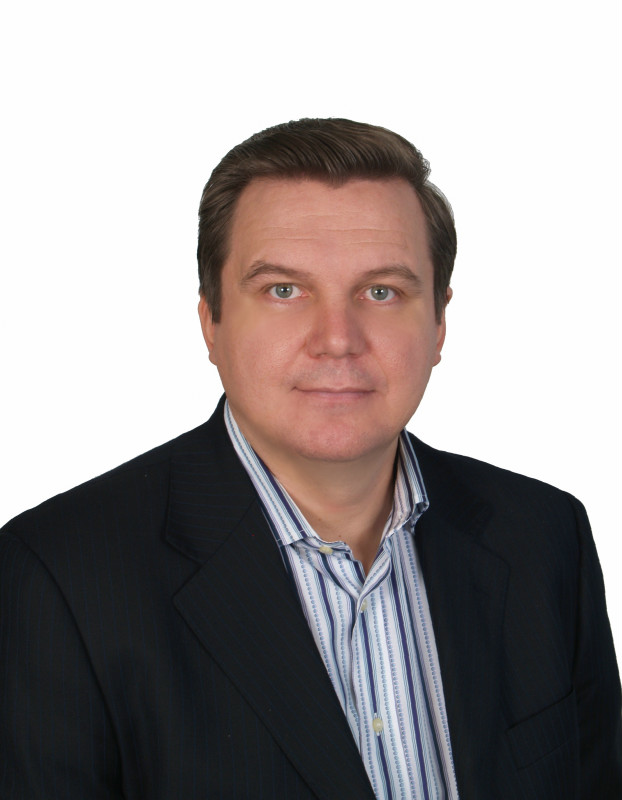
- Official portrait, 2012

Member of the State Duma (Party List Seat)
- Incumbent
- Assumed office 21 December 2011

Vice Chairman of the State Duma
- In office 30 September 2020 – 12 October 2021
- Chairman: Vyacheslav Volodin

Personal details
- Born: 6 September 1966 (age 59) Ordzhonikidze, North Ossetian ASSR, RSFSR, USSR
- Party: A Just Russia (from 2016); LDPR (until 2016)
- Education: Makarov Leningrad Higher Marine Engineering School; EMERCOM St. Petersburg University of State Fire Service

Igor Alexandrovich Ananskikh (Russian: Игорь Александрович Ананских; born 6 September 1966) is a Russian politician and Deputy of the State Duma of the Federal Assembly of the Russian Federation.

Ananskikh was awarded the Medal of the Order "For Merit to the Fatherland" Second Class on 5 April 2017 "for a great contribution to the development of Russian parliamentism and active legislative affairs."

== Sanctions ==
He was sanctioned by the UK government in 2022 in relation to the Russo-Ukrainian War.

On 24 March 2022, the United States Treasury sanctioned him in response to the 2022 Russian invasion of Ukraine.
