= Timur Prokopenko =

Russian politician (born 1980)

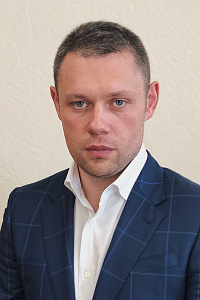
- Prokopenko in 2017

Member of the State Duma
- In office 21 December 2011 – 13 February 2012
- Succeeded by: Vasily Maksimov

Personal details
- Born: 27 May 1980 (age 46)
- Party: United Russia

Timur Valentinovich Prokopenko (Russian: Тимур Валентинович Прокопенко; born 27 May 1980) is a Russian politician. From 2011 to 2012, he was a member of the State Duma. From 2010 to 2012, he served as chairman of the Young Guard of United Russia.
