= Nadezhda Shaydenko =

Russian professor and politician (1952–2024)

- Надежда Шайденко
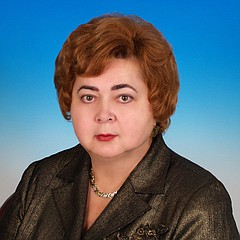
- Shaydenko in 2020

Member of the State Duma
- In office 4 December 2011 – September 2016

Personal details
- Born: Nadezhda Anatolyevna Shaydenko; 23 November 1952 Tula, Russian SFSR, USSR
- Died: 5 March 2024 (aged 71) Tula, Russia
- Party: United Russia
- Education: Tula State Pedagogical University
- Occupation: Academic

Nadezhda Anatolyevna Shaydenko (Russian: Надежда Анатольевна Шайденко; 23 November 1952 – 5 March 2024) was a Russian academic and politician. A member of United Russia, she served in the State Duma from 2011 to 2016. Deputy Chairman of the State Duma Committee on Education. Corresponding Member of the Russian Academy of Education (2011).

== Biography ==
She was born on November 23, 1952, into a family of educators. In 1973, she graduated with honors from the Faculty of History and Philology of the Tula State Pedagogical Institute named after Lev Tolstoy. She worked for several years as a teacher of the Russian language and as an organizer of extracurricular and out-of-school activities at the secondary school in the settlement of Petelino. In 1977, she moved to a position at the Pedagogical Institute. Until 1981, she served as an assistant at the Department of Pedagogy and Psychology, and later as Vice-Rector for Distance Education and for Academic Affairs. In 1992, she was elected Rector of the Tula State Pedagogical University, a position she held until 2012. In 1994, Shaidenko defended her doctoral dissertation in Pedagogical Sciences.

In 2011, Shaidenko was elected a Corresponding Member of the Russian Academy of Education (Department of General Secondary Education, specialization: “Didactics of Life Safety”). Since 2017, she has headed the Center for Strategic Planning of Educational Development, Expertise, and Scientific Consulting at the Institute for Advanced Training and Professional Retraining of Education Workers of the Tula Region. She is the author of more than five hundred scholarly works on issues in pedagogy.

Shaydenko died in Tula on 5 March 2024, at the age of 71.
