= JSC Star =

Aircraft part manufacturer in Russia

- Company type: Joint-stock company
- Founded: 1938; 88 years ago
- Headquarters: Perm, Russia
- Products: Aircraft fuel systems
- Parent: United Engine Corporation
- Website: www.ao-star.ru

JSC Star (Russian: Акционерное общество «ОДК-СТАР»), formerly Perm Kalinin Component Production Association, is a company based in Perm, Russia. It is part of United Engine Corporation.

JSC Star produces aircraft engine fuel systems and other components for military and civilian aircraft.
