= Oleg Lebedev (politician, born 1964) =

Russian politician

- Олег Лебедев
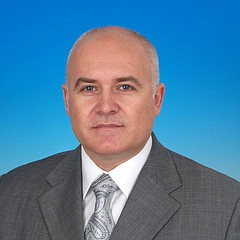

Member of Parliament in the State Duma
- In office 2007–2016

Personal details
- Born: Oleg Vladimirovich Lebedev; 21 March 1964 (age 62) Rudny, Kazakhstan, Soviet Union
- Party: United Russia

Oleg Vladimirovich Lebedev (Russian: Олег Владимирович Лебедев; born on 21 March 1964) is a Kazakh-born Russian politician who had been a member of parliament of the State Duma of the 5th and 6th convocations.

== Biography ==
Oleg Lebedev was born on 21 March 1964 in Rudny, Kazakhstan, and raised in Partenit, Crimea. In 1981, he received his secondary education at the Frunze village school of Alushta, after which he entered the Kharkiv Higher Military Aviation School of Radio Electronics named after the Lenin Komsomol of Ukraine, which he graduated in 1985. In 1986 he took part in the Soviet–Afghan War. There, while moving on the route from Kabul to Ghazni, the convoy, which was accompanied by Lebedev, came under fire. Two vehicles were hit. Having destroyed the machine-gun crew, it was possible to withdraw the convoy from the shelling. For these actions, Lebedev was subsequently awarded a combat award of the Order of the Red Star.

In 1996, he founded The Generation charitable foundation, whose activities were aimed at the development of education, sports and health care. The Foundation collaborated with the Moscow Scientific Center for Cardiovascular Surgery named after V.I. Bakulev, and raised funds for complex heart surgeries for children. In addition, the foundation has established a literary prize for young authors - "Debut". He was the general director of the fund until 2007, until he went into politics, after which he headed the board of trustees for a long time.

In 2003, he graduated from the Russia Academy of Civil Service. Lebedev was elected to the State Duma in 2007 and 2011. He was the first deputy of the Duma Committee on CIS affairs, Eurasian integration and relations with compatriots. As a member of the State Duma, he has authored 73 bills, some of which became federal laws, including changes concerning the regulation of the wine industry.

In 2012, he graduated from the All-Russian Academy of Foreign Trade. He has now returned to Crimea and lives in his father's house. He is a leading researcher at the Institute of Economics and Management at the Crimean Federal University.

He is sanctioned by the United Kingdom from 12 September 2014 in relation to Russia's activities in Crimea.
