= Noginsk constituency =

Russian legislative constituency

Noginsk single-member constituency
- Constituency of the Russian State Duma
- Deputy: None
- Federal subject: Moscow Oblast
- Districts: Chernogolovka, Elektrostal, Fryazino, Losino-Petrovsky, Noginsky, most of Shchyolkovsky
- Voters: 516,456 (2003)

The Noginsk constituency (No.110 (Note: No.109 in 1995-2003)) was a Russian legislative constituency in Moscow Oblast in 1993–2007. It covered eastern suburbs and exurbs of Moscow. The seat was last occupied by United Russia faction member Vladimir Pekarev, owner of several distilling and beverage companies, who narrowly defeated two-term incumbent State Duma member Nikolay Stolyarov in the 1999 election.

The constituency was dissolved in 2007 when State Duma adopted full proportional representation for the next two electoral cycles. Noginsk constituency was not re-established for the 2016 election, currently Noginsk and Shchyolkovo are part of Shchyolkovo constituency, while Elektrostal was placed into Orekhovo-Zuyevo constituency.

== Boundaries ==
1993–1995: Balashikha, Balashikhinsky District, Elektrostal, Noginsk, Noginsky District, Reutov, Zheleznodorozhny
The constituency covered eastern suburbs and exurbs of Moscow, including Balashikha, Elektrostal, Noginsk, Reutov and Zheleznodorozhny.

1995-2003: Elektrostal, Fryazino, Noginsk, Noginsky District, Shchyolkovo, Shchyolkovsky District
After 1995 redistricting the constituency was pushed to the north-east, losing Balashikha and Zheleznodorozhny to Pushkin constituency, in turn, gaining Shchyolkovo from the eliminated Shchyolkovo constituency.

2003–2007: Chernogolovka, Elektrostal, Fryazino, Losino-Petrovsky, Noginsky District, most of Shchyolkovsky District
Following the 2003 redistricting, the constituency retained almost all of its territory, losing only a small part in north-western Shchyolkovsky District to Pushkin constituency.

== Members elected ==
Election	Member	Party
1993	Nikolay Stolyarov	Independent
1995	Nikolay Stolyarov	Independent
1999	Vladimir Pekarev	Independent
2003	Vladimir Pekarev	Independent

== Election results ==
=== 1993 ===
==== Declared candidates ====
- Vitaly Aristov (Independent), x-ray optics and nanoelectronics scientist
- Valentin Chikin (CPRF), former People's Deputy of Russia (1990–1993), editor-in-chief of Sovetskaya Rossiya (1986–present)
- Gennady Chirkov (Choice of Russia), Deputy Head of Administration of Noginsky District
- Oleg Finko (LDPR), journalist
- Varvara Golubeva (Independent), Deputy Head of Administration of Balashikhinsky District
- Anatoly Lobanov (Independent), attorney
- Kronid Lyubarsky (RDDR), human rights activist, astrophysicist
- Yury Milovidov (Civic Union), union leader
- Yury Mirolyubov (Independent), journalist
- Vladimir Moskalets (DPR), Mayor of Saltykovka (1992–present)
- Nikolay Serbin (APR), construction executive
- Nikolay Stolyarov (Independent), former advisor to Supreme Council of Russia Chairman Ruslan Khasbulatov (1992–1993), retired Russian Air Force major general

==== Results ====
Summary of the 12 December 1993 Russian legislative election in the Noginsk constituency
Candidate	Party	Votes	%
Nikolay Stolyarov	Independent	35,972	11.20%
Anatoly Lobanov	Independent	35,647	11.09%
Vitaly Aristov	Independent	33,363	10.38%
Gennady Chirkov	Choice of Russia	26,564	8.27%
Varvara Golubeva	Independent	24,081	7.49%
Vladimir Moskalets	Democratic Party	18,292	5.69%
Valentin Chikin	Communist Party	14,701	4.58%
Oleg Finko	Liberal Democratic Party	12,208	3.80%
Yury Mirolyubov	Independent	10,676	3.32%
Kronid Lyubarsky	Russian Democratic Reform Movement	8,771	2.73%
Yury Milovidov	Civic Union	7,265	2.26%
Nikolay Serbin	Agrarian Party	3,684	1.15%
against all		68,380	21.28%
Total		321,297	100%

=== 1995 ===
==== Declared candidates ====
- Vitaly Aristov (CPRF), x-ray optics and nanoelectronics scientist, 1993 candidate for this seat
- Oleg Filippov (Interethnic Union), nonprofit chairman, physician
- Oleg Finko (LDPR), Member of State Duma (1994–present), 1993 candidate for this seat
- Viktor Gavrilov (Duma-96), business association executive
- Aleksey Lezhnyov (Independent), orthodox church property manager
- Vitaly Orlov (Independent), retired Soviet Army colonel, Hero of the Soviet Union (1945)
- Anatoly Osipov (Independent), engineer
- Nikolay Pashin (NDR), Head of Administration of Shchyolkovsky District (1991–present)
- Nikolay Stolyarov (Independent), incumbent Member of State Duma (1994–present)
- Sergey Sychev (Independent), metallurgy businessman
- Tatyana Yarygina (Yabloko), Member of State Duma (1994–present)
- Zoya Yegorova (Derzhava), chief of staff to Derzhava party

==== Results ====
Summary of the 17 December 1995 Russian legislative election in the Noginsk constituency
Candidate	Party	Votes	%
Nikolay Stolyarov (incumbent)	Independent	65,967	19.93%
Nikolay Pashin	Our Home – Russia	49,417	14.93%
Vitaly Aristov	Communist Party	49,347	14.91%
Tatyana Yarygina	Yabloko	41,449	12.52%
Aleksey Lezhnyov	Independent	30,507	9.22%
Sergey Sychev	Independent	13,608	4.11%
Vitaly Orlov	Independent	9,451	2.86%
Anatoly Osipov	Independent	8,702	2.63%
Zoya Yegorova	Derzhava	4,801	1.45%
Oleg Finko	Liberal Democratic Party	4,475	1.35%
Viktor Gavrilov	Duma-96	3,389	1.02%
Oleg Filippov	Interethnic Union	1,919	0.58%
against all		38,305	11.57%
Total		330,949	100%

=== 1999 ===
==== Declared candidates ====
- Vladimir Alferov (SPS), business association executive director
- Vitaly Aristov (DN), x-ray optics and nanoelectronics scientist, 1993 and 1995 CPRF candidate for this seat
- Vladimir Davydov (Independent), Russian Army officer
- Yury Ivanov (CPRF), Member of State Duma (1994–present)
- Yevgeny Khoroshevtsev (Unity), narrator, radio host
- Anatoly Koltunov (Independent), former People's Deputy of Russia (1990–1993)
- Vera Krylyshkina (Yabloko), attorney
- Valery Litvinov (Independent), Member of Moscow Oblast Duma (1997–present), poultry farm director
- Nikolay Ozerov (Independent), nonprofit president
- Lyubov Panchenko (NDR), Member of State Duma (1999–present)
- Vladimir Pekarev (Independent), Member of Moscow Oblast Duma (1997–present), beverage businessman
- Aleksandr Romanoich (Independent), publishing businessman
- Nikolay Stolyarov (OVR), incumbent Member of State Duma (1994–present)

==== Withdrawn candidates ====
- Vladimir Ukhalkin (Independent), businessman, retired Russian Army colonel

==== Failed to qualify ====
- Sergey Taranenko (Nikolayev–Fyodorov Bloc), Member of Moscow Oblast Duma (1993–present)

==== Did not file ====
- Anatoly Arzamastsev (PME), former Chairman of the State Committee on Employment (1991)
- Vyacheslav Kiselyov (LDPR), Member of State Duma (1994–present)
- Galina Kuzyayeva (Independent)
- Vladimir Sukharev (Independent)
- Anatoly Teshchin (Independent)
- Yelena Yevstigneyeva (Independent)

==== Results ====
Summary of the 19 December 1999 Russian legislative election in the Noginsk constituency
Candidate	Party	Votes	%
Vladimir Pekarev	Independent	66,131	20.58%
Nikolay Stolyarov (incumbent)	Fatherland – All Russia	58,015	18.05%
Yury Ivanov	Communist Party	51,882	16.14%
Vera Krylyshkina	Yabloko	29,378	9.14%
Valery Litvinov	Independent	16,714	5.20%
Nikolay Ozerov	Independent	9,016	2.81%
Vladimir Alferov	Union of Right Forces	7,880	2.45%
Aleksandr Romanovich	Independent	7,825	2.43%
Lyubov Panchenko	Our Home – Russia	7,330	2.28%
Yevgeny Khoroshevtsev	Unity	6,691	2.08%
Vitaly Aristov	Spiritual Heritage	4,818	1.50%
Anatoly Koltunov	Independent	3,533	1.10%
Vladimir Davydov	Independent	2,743	0.85%
against all		42,212	13.13%
Total		321,407	100%

=== 2003 ===
==== Declared candidates ====
- Sergey Burov (PVR-RPZh), businessman
- Sergey Golubev (Independent), Shchyolkovo chamber of commerce director
- Sergey Kulakov (ORP Rus'), attorney
- Vladimir Pekarev (Independent), incumbent Member of State Duma (2000–present)
- Anatoly Sonin (SPS), pensioner
- Aleksey Vedekhov (Independent), nonprofit director

==== Did not file ====
- Sergey Fedoritenko (Independent), Yury Gagarin Air Force Academy senior lecturer
- Vladimir Koptelov (Independent), unemployed
- Boris Ryzhkov (SPDR), textiles businessman

==== Results ====
Summary of the 7 December 2003 Russian legislative election in the Noginsk constituency
Candidate	Party	Votes	%
Vladimir Pekarev (incumbent)	Independent	138,081	50.49%
Aleksey Vedekhov	Independent	27,534	10.07%
Anatoly Sonin	Union of Right Forces	13,321	4.87%
Sergey Burov	Party of Russia's Rebirth-Russian Party of Life	10,649	3.89%
Sergey Golubev	Independent	8,274	3.03%
Sergey Kulakov	United Russian Party Rus'	7,447	2.72%
against all		61,535	22.50%
Total		274,235	100%
