= Shchyolkovo constituency =

Election constituency in Moscow Oblast, Russia

Shchyolkovo single-member constituency
- Constituency of the Russian State Duma
- Deputy: Andrey Bulgakov; United Russia
- Federal subject: Moscow Oblast
- Districts: Bogorodsky, Chernogolovka, Fryazino, Losino-Petrovsky, Ramenskoye (Gzhelskoye, Kratovo, Novokharitonovskoye), Shchyolkovo, Zvyozdny gorodok
- Other territory: Baikonur
- Voters: 472,401 (2026)

The Shchyolkovo constituency (No.129 (Note: No.114 in 1993-1995, No.127 in 2016–2026)) is a Russian legislative constituency in Moscow Oblast. The constituency covers eastern suburbs and exurbs of Moscow as well as includes voters in Baikonur.

The constituency has been represented since 2026 by United Russia deputy Andrey Bulgakov, former mayor of Shchyolkovo and Kotelniki, who won the open seat after one-term United Russia incumbent Aleksandr Tolmachyov ran for Moscow Oblast Duma.

== Boundaries ==
1993–1995: Fryazino, Ivanteyevka, Kaliningrad, Krasnoarmeysk, Pushkino, Pushkinsky District, Shchyolkovo, Shchyolkovsky District, Yubileyny
The constituency covered north-eastern outer suburbs of Moscow, including the cities Fryazino, Ivanteyevka, Kaliningrad, Krasnoarmeysk, Pushkino and Shchyolkovo.

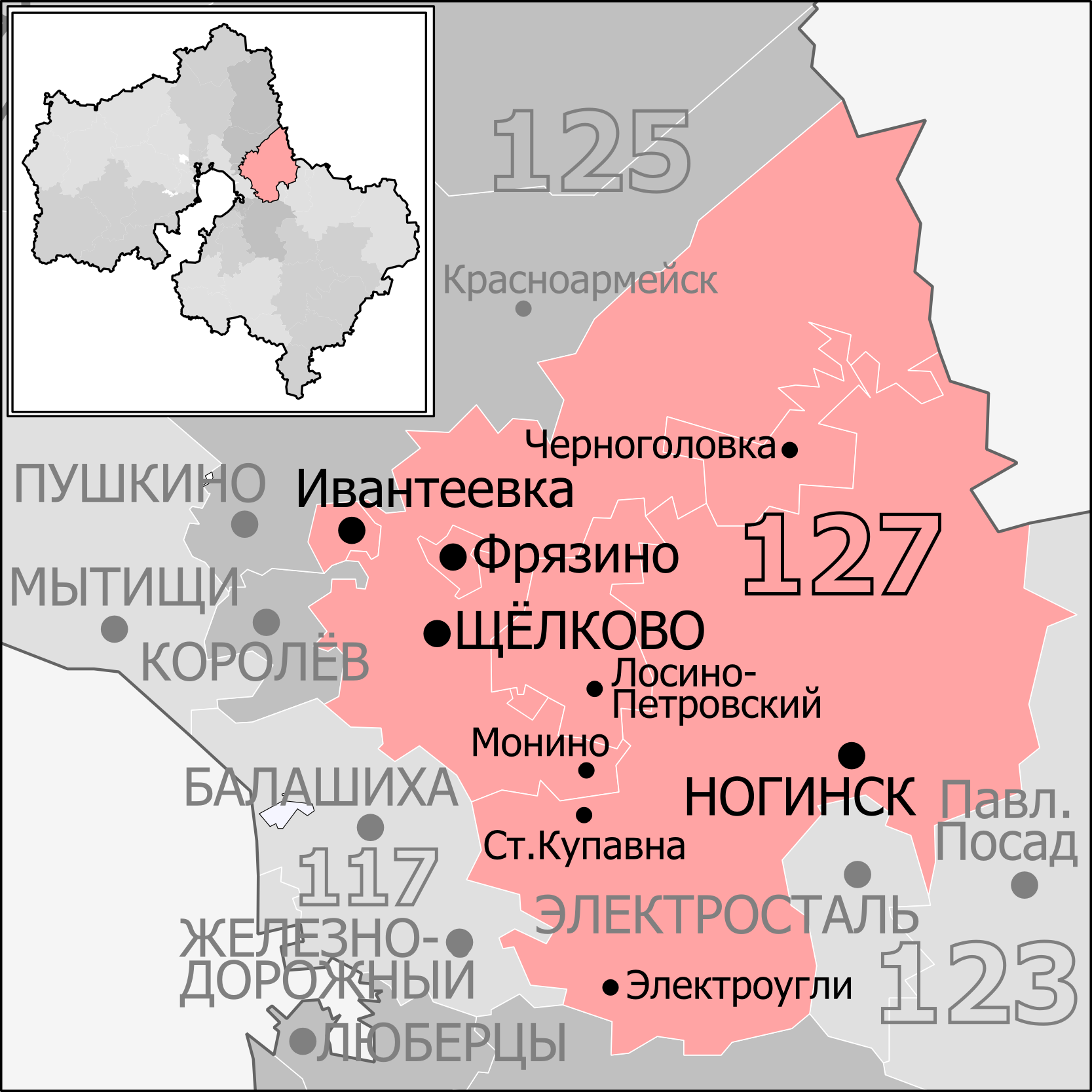
Constituency boundaries from 2016 to 2026

2016–2026: Chernogolovka, Fryazino, Ivanteyevka, Losino-Petrovsky, Noginsk, Shchyolkovo, Zvyozdny gorodok
The constituency was re-created for the 2016 election and took all of former Noginsk constituency, except Elektrostal, as well as Ivanteyevka from Pushkino constituency.

2026–present: Bogorodsky District, Chernogolovka, Fryazino, Losino-Petrovsky, Ramenskoye (Gzhelskoye, Kratovo, Novokharitonovskoye), Shchyolkovo, Zvyozdny gorodok
After the 2025 redistricting the constituency was significantly changed, only losing Ivanteyevka to Pushkino constituency. This seat gained north-eastern corner of Ramenskoye from Lyubertsy constituency.

== Members elected ==
Election	Member	Party
1993	Vladimir Zhirinovsky	Liberal Democratic Party
1995	Constituency eliminated	
1999	Constituency eliminated	
2003	Constituency eliminated	
2007	Proportional representation - no election by constituency	
2011	Proportional representation - no election by constituency	
2016	Sergey Zhigarev	Liberal Democratic Party
2021	Aleksandr Tolmachyov	United Russia
2026	Andrey Bulgakov	United Russia

== Election results ==
=== 1993 ===
Summary of the 12 December 1993 Russian legislative election in the Shchyolkovo constituency
Candidate	Party	Votes	%
Vladimir Zhirinovsky	Liberal Democratic Party	104,874	34.51%
Nikolay Pashin	Independent	39,329	12.94%
Oleg Novikov	Choice of Russia	35,320	11.62%
Aleksey Adrov	Civic Union	31,820	10.47%
Vladimir Kulbida	Independent	16,688	5.49%
Vladimir Solodovnikov	Yavlinsky–Boldyrev–Lukin	12,829	4.22%
against all		45,676	15.03%
Total		303,936	100%

=== 2016 ===
Summary of the 18 September 2016 Russian legislative election in the Shchyolkovo constituency
Candidate	Party	Votes	%
Sergey Zhigarev	Liberal Democratic Party	62,049	33.43%
Natalya Yeremeytseva	Communist Party	43,144	23.24%
Oleg Volkov	A Just Russia	20,519	11.06%
Irina Kukushkina	Yabloko	9,693	5.22%
Lyubov Filipp	Party of Growth	8,511	4.59%
Oleg Shirokov	Patriots of Russia	8,235	4.44%
Pavel Seliverstov	Communists of Russia	7,690	4.14%
Georgy Goryachevsky	Rodina	6,530	3.52%
Nikolay Garankin	The Greens	6,267	3.38%
Total		185,606	100%

=== 2021 ===
Summary of the 17-19 September 2021 Russian legislative election in the Shchyolkovo constituency
Candidate	Party	Votes	%
Aleksandr Tolmachyov	United Russia	83,437	38.30%
Yelena Mokrinskaya	Communist Party	51,347	23.57%
Oleg Shirokov	A Just Russia — For Truth	14,403	6.61%
Igor Konstantinov	Liberal Democratic Party	14,233	6.53%
Tatyana Zykova	Party of Pensioners	13,534	6.21%
Yegor Timofeyev	New People	11,609	5.33%
Artyom Kovalev	The Greens	7,529	3.46%
Irina Kukushkina	Yabloko	6,051	2.78%
Viktor Zvagelsky	Party of Growth	3,574	1.64%
Total		217,846	100%

=== 2026 ===
Summary of the 18-20 September 2026 Russian legislative election in the Shchyolkovo constituency
Candidate	Party	Votes	%
Andrey Bulgakov	United Russia	147,282	57.79%
Anna Piksaykina	New People	25,741	10.10%
Yelena Mokrinskaya	Communist Party	25,673	10.07%
Anastasia Naumkina	Liberal Democratic Party	18,788	7.37%
Eduard Chilikin	A Just Russia	13,541	5.31%
Tatyana Zykova	Party of Pensioners	6,671	2.62%
Ilya Myakinin	Rodina	6,420	2.52%
Valentina Morenova	Communists of Russia	4,970	1.95%
Aleksandr Syrov	The Greens	3,183	1.25%
Total		254,878	100%
