= 2026 Moscow Oblast legislative election =

Regional legislative election in Russia

- 18–20 September 2026

All 50 seats in the Oblast Duma 26 seats needed for a majority
- Turnout: 51.30% ▲6.57 pp
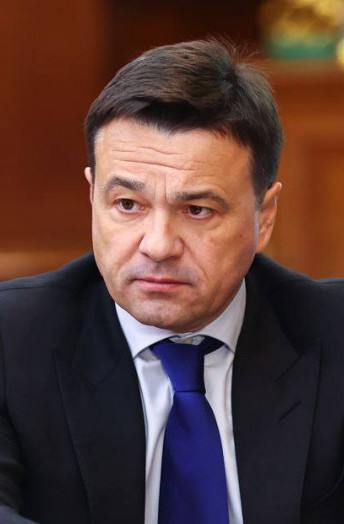

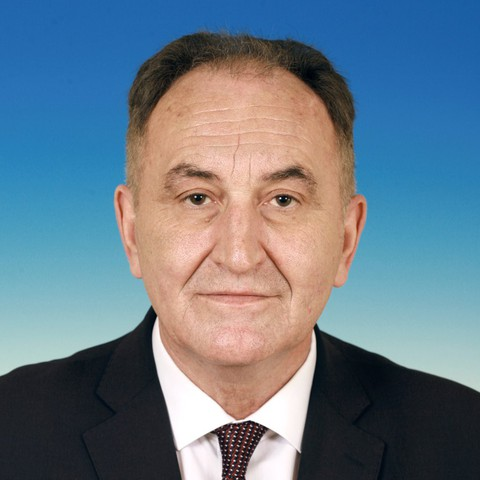

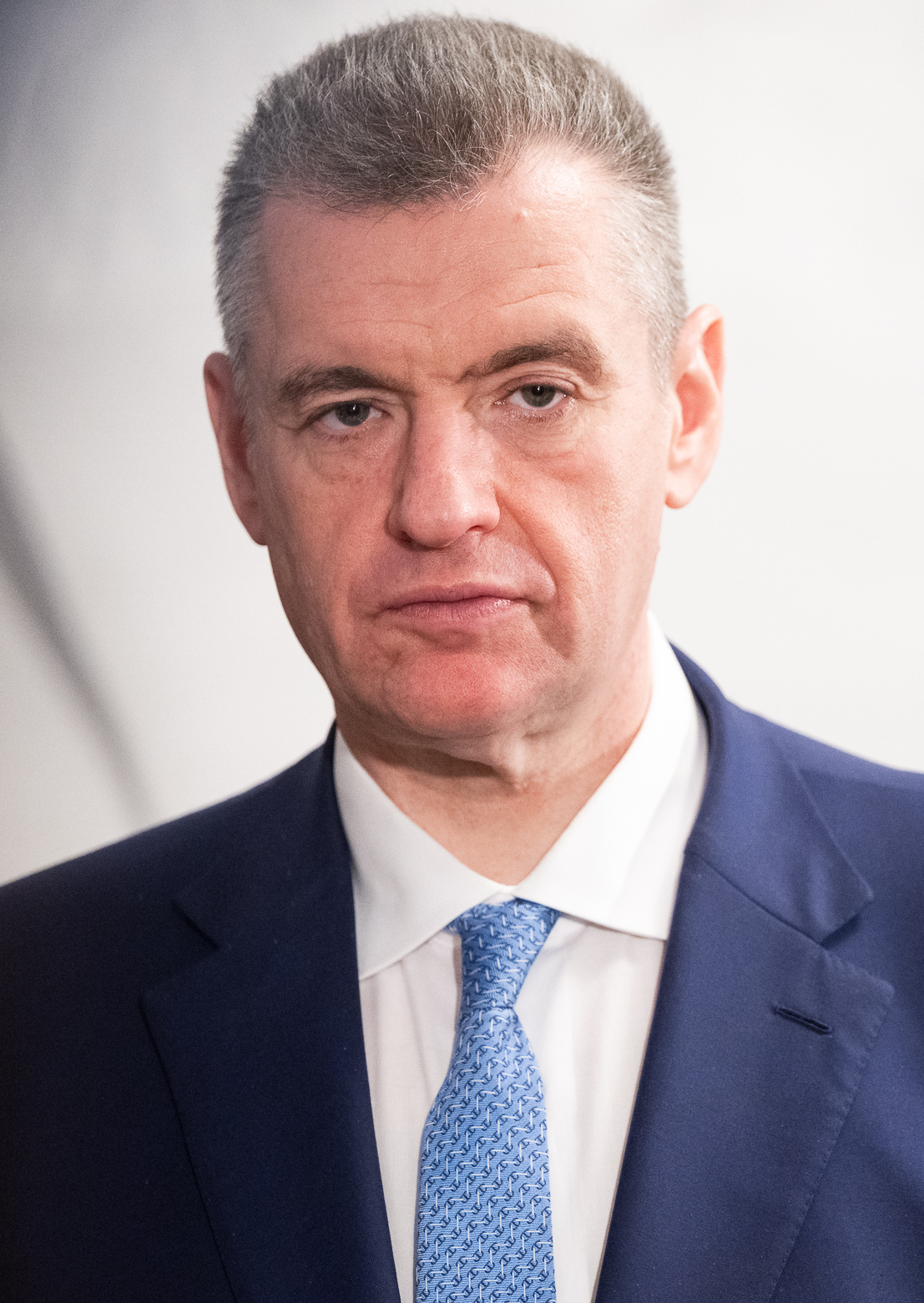

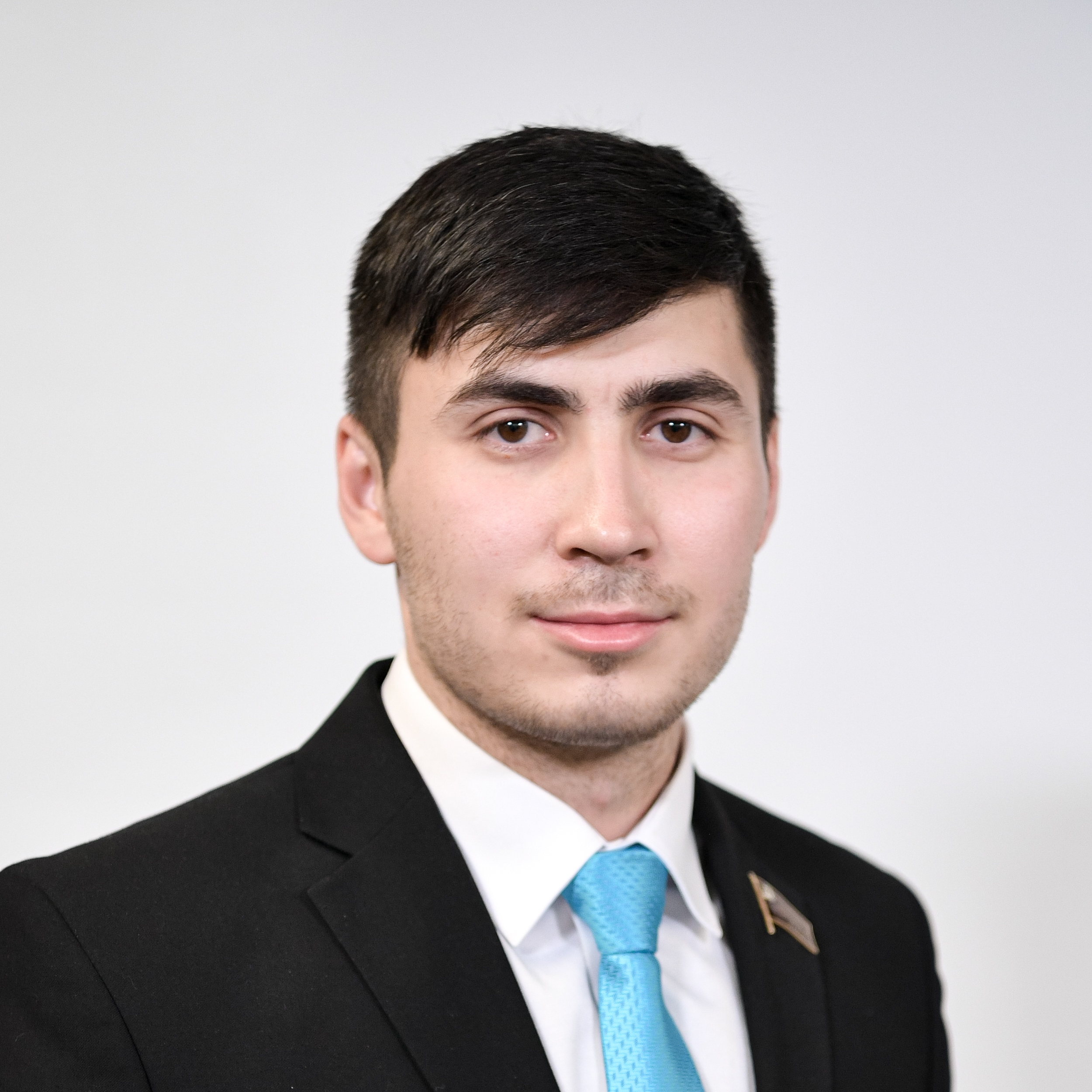

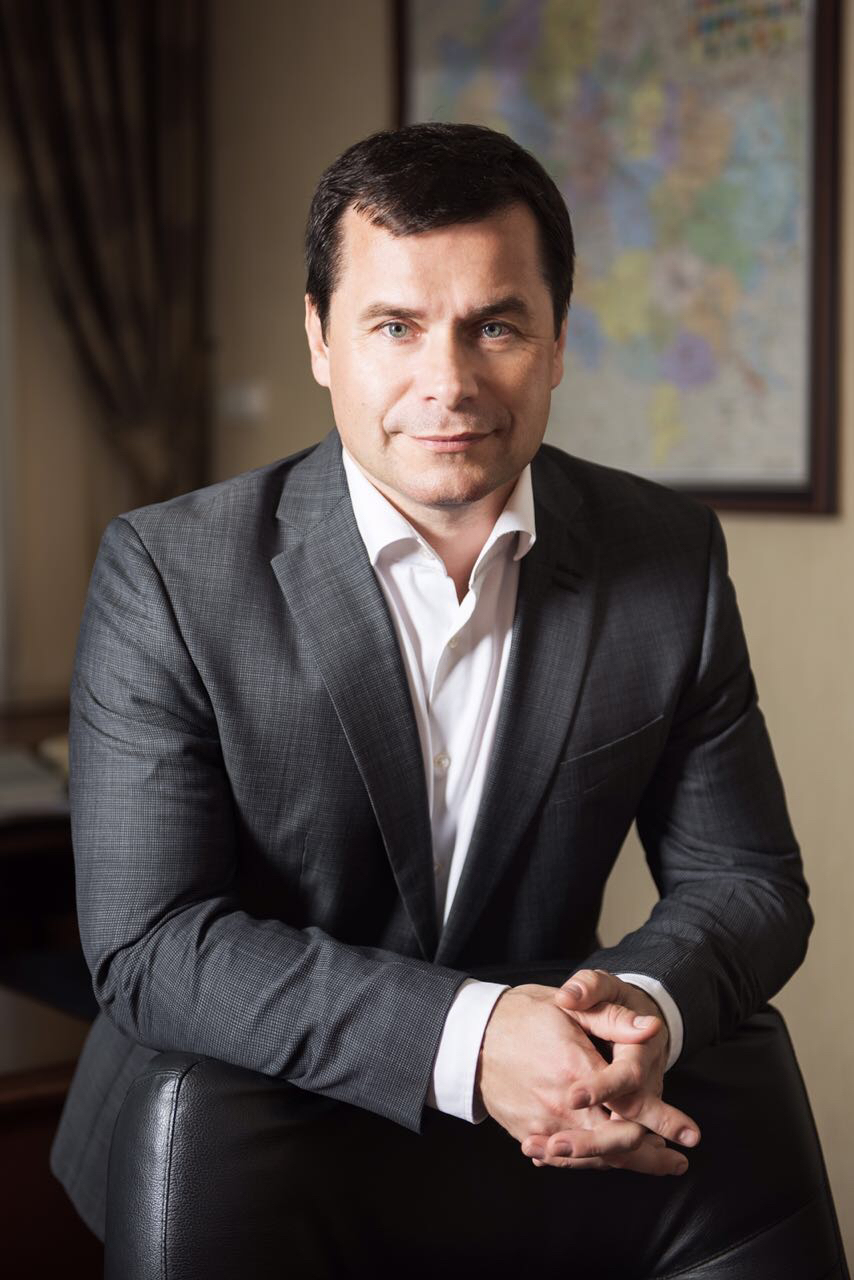

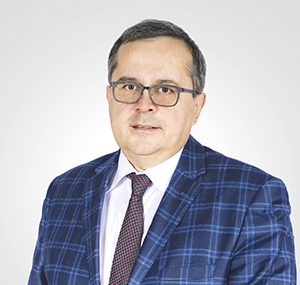
| | Majority party | Minority party | Third party |
|---|---|---|---|
| Candidate | Andrey Vorobyov | Nikolay Vasilyev | Leonid Slutsky |
| Party | United Russia | CPRF | LDPR |
| Last election | 45.15%, 36 seats | 19.47%, 7 seats | 7.95%, 2 seats |
| Seats won | 39 | 5 | 3 |
| Seat change | ▲3 | ▼2 | ▲1 |
| Popular vote | 1,821,301 | 444,428 | 287,584 |
| Percentage | 57.25% | 13.97% | 9.04% |
| Swing | ▲12.10 pp | ▼5.50 pp | ▲1.09 pp |
| | Fourth party | Fifth party | Sixth party |
| Candidate | Lev Zakirov | Igor Chistyukhin | Erik Prazdnikov |
| Party | New People | A Just Russia | Party of Pensioners |
| Last election | 5.29%, 1 seat | 7.16%, 3 seats | 4.25%, 0 seats |
| Seats won | 2 | 1 | 0 |
| Seat change | ▲1 | ▼2 | Steady |
| Popular vote | 284,776 | 142,162 | 63,225 |
| Percentage | 8.95% | 4.47% | 1.99% |
| Swing | ▲3.66 pp | ▼2.69 pp | ▼2.26 pp |
Chairman before election
Igor Bryntsalov
United Russia
Elected Chairman
Igor Bryntsalov
United Russia
Senator before election
Alexander Dvoinykh
United Russia
Senator after election
Alexander Dvoinykh
United Russia

The 2026 Moscow Oblast Duma election took place on 18–20 September 2026, on common election day, coinciding with the 2026 Russian legislative election. All 50 seats in the Oblast Duma were up for re-election.

United Russia increased its overwhelming majority in the Oblast Duma, winning 57.3% of the vote and 22 single-mandate constituencies. Communist Party of the Russian Federation placed second but lost two seats to a five-member faction. Liberal Democratic Party of Russia and New People increased their vote share and gained one seat each. A Just Russia failed to cross the 5% threshold but retained one deputy winning a single-mandate constituency.

== Electoral system ==
Under current election laws, the Oblast Duma is elected for a term of five years, with parallel voting. 25 seats are elected by party-list proportional representation with a 5% electoral threshold, with the other half elected in 25 single-member constituencies by first-past-the-post voting. Seats in the proportional part are allocated using the Imperiali quota, modified to ensure that every party list, which passes the threshold, receives at least one mandate.

== Candidates ==
=== Party lists ===
To register regional lists of candidates, parties need to collect 0.5% of signatures of all registered voters in Moscow Oblast.

The following parties were relieved from the necessity to collect signatures:

- United Russia
- Communist Party of the Russian Federation
- Liberal Democratic Party of Russia
- A Just Russia
- New People
- Russian Party of Pensioners for Social Justice
- Communists of Russia
- Russian Ecological Party "The Greens"

| № | Party | Oblast-wide list | Candidates | Territorial groups | Status |
|---|---|---|---|---|---|
| 1 | Communists of Russia | Ilya Kleymyonov • Sergey Malinkovich • Yaroslav Sidorov | 93 | 25 | Registered |
| 2 | Party of Pensioners | Erik Prazdnikov • Andrey Svintsov • Vladimir Vorozhtsov | 32 | 23 | Registered |
| 3 | Communist Party | Nikolay Vasilyev • Aleksandr Naumov • Yelena Mokrinskaya • Oleg Yemelyanov • Vasily Stasyuk | 86 | 25 | Registered |
| 4 | A Just Russia | Igor Chistyukhin • Aleksandr Vorobyov • Aleksandr Volnushkin | 71 | 24 | Registered |
| 5 | New People | Lev Zakirov • Aleksey Pylev • Yury Soldatov • Anna Piksaykina | 61 | 25 | Registered |
| 6 | The Greens | Marianna Kristalinskaya • Sergey Shakhmatov • Aleksandr Syrov • Stepan Solovyov • Pyotr Popov | 54 | 25 | Registered |
| 7 | United Russia | Andrey Vorobyov • Sergey Peshkin • Alexander Dvoinykh • Mikhail Terentyev • Denis Perepelitsyn | 80 | 25 | Registered |
| 8 | Liberal Democratic Party | Leonid Slutsky • Vladimir Butenko • Konstantin Nikolayev • Maksim Dolgopolov | 90 | 25 | Registered |
| | Yabloko | Sergey Kryzhov • Aleksandr Muravyev • Svetlana Smirnova | 20 | 17 | Failed to qualify |
| | Rodina | Arseny Sterligov • Andrey Poletayev • Denis Petrozhitsky • Viktoria Kosenkova • Natalia Beloglazova | 26 | 15 | Failed to qualify |

=== Single-mandate constituencies ===
25 single-mandate constituencies were formed in Moscow Oblast. To register candidates in single-mandate constituencies need to collect 3% of signatures of registered voters in the constituency.

Number of candidates in single-mandate constituencies
| Party | Candidates | |
| Party | Nominated | Registered |
|---|---|---|
| United Russia | 25 | 22 |
| Communist Party | 25 | 24 |
| Liberal Democratic Party | 25 | 25 |
| A Just Russia | 24 | 21 |
| New People | 25 | 23 |
| Party of Pensioners | 15 | 13 |
| Communists of Russia | 1 | 0 |
| The Greens | 22 | 21 |
| Yabloko | 3 | 0 |
| Independent | 7 | 1 |
| Total | 172 | 150 |

== Results ==
=== Results by party lists ===
Summary of the 18–20 September 2026 Moscow Oblast Duma election results
| Party | Party list | | | | | Constituency | | Total | |
| Party | Votes | % | ±pp | Seats | +/– | Seats | +/– | Seats | +/– |
|---|---|---|---|---|---|---|---|---|---|
| United Russia | 1,821,301 | 57.25 | ▲12.10 | 17 | ▲3 | 22 | Steady | 39 | ▲3 |
| Communist Party | 444,428 | 13.97 | ▼5.50 | 4 | ▼2 | 1 | Steady | 5 | ▼2 |
| Liberal Democratic Party | 287,584 | 9.04 | ▲1.09 | 2 | Steady | 1 | ▲1 | 3 | ▲1 |
| New People | 284,776 | 8.95 | ▲3.66 | 2 | ▲1 | 0 | Steady | 2 | ▲1 |
| A Just Russia | 142,162 | 4.47 | ▼2.69 | 0 | ▼2 | 1 | Steady | 1 | ▼2 |
| Party of Pensioners | 63,225 | 1.99 | ▼2.26 | 0 | Steady | 0 | Steady | 0 | Steady |
| The Greens | 55,001 | 1.73 | ▼0.16 | 0 | Steady | 0 | Steady | 0 | Steady |
| Communists of Russia | 45,697 | 1.44 | ▼0.71 | 0 | Steady | – | – | 0 | Steady |
| Independent | – | – | – | – | – | 0 | ▼1 | 0 | ▼1 |
| Invalid ballots | 36,991 | 1.16 | ▼2.33 | — | — | — | — | — | — |
| Total | 3,181,249 | 100.00 | — | 25 | Steady | 25 | Steady | 50 | Steady |
| Turnout | 3,181,249 | 51.30 | ▲6.57 | — | — | — | — | — | — |
| Registered voters | 6,200,679 | 100.00 | — | — | — | — | — | — | — |

Igor Bryntsalov (United Russia) was re-elected as Chairman of the Oblast Duma, while incumbent Senator Alexander Dvoinykh (United Russia) was re-appointed to the Federation Council.

=== Results in single-member constituencies ===
==== District 1 ====
Summary of the 18–20 September 2026 Moscow Oblast Duma election in Balashikhinsky constituency No.1
| Candidate | Party | Votes | % |
|---|---|---|---|
| Vladimir Shapkin (incumbent) | United Russia | 73,813 | 52.76% |
| Oleg Zverev | Communist Party | 21,977 | 15.71% |
| Anastasia Naumkina | Liberal Democratic Party | 15,126 | 10.81% |
| Mikhail Abramov | New People | 14,608 | 10.44% |
| Dmitry Shinkarev | A Just Russia | 10,154 | 7.26% |
| Pyotr Popov | The Greens | 3,507 | 2.51% |
| Total | | 139,900 | 100% |

==== District 2 ====
Summary of the 18–20 September 2026 Moscow Oblast Duma election in Voskresensky constituency No.2
| Candidate | Party | Votes | % |
|---|---|---|---|
| Yekaterina Lobysheva (incumbent) | United Russia | 57,901 | 49.75% |
| Vladimir Kondrashov | Communist Party | 18,606 | 15.99% |
| Konstantin Musin | Liberal Democratic Party | 16,874 | 14.50% |
| Maria Sinitsyna | New People | 13,960 | 12.00% |
| Dmitry Gelevera | The Greens | 6,833 | 5.87% |
| Total | | 116,373 | 100% |

==== District 3 ====
Summary of the 18–20 September 2026 Moscow Oblast Duma election in Dmitrovsky constituency No.3
| Candidate | Party | Votes | % |
|---|---|---|---|
| Aleksandr Orlov (incumbent) | United Russia | 60,685 | 47.82% |
| Denis Starodubov | Communist Party | 26,332 | 20.75% |
| Maria Moilanen | New People | 15,688 | 12.36% |
| Daniil Zhabin | Liberal Democratic Party | 14,586 | 11.49% |
| Vladislav Chuvakov | The Greens | 6,404 | 5.05% |
| Total | | 126,895 | 100% |

==== District 4 ====
Summary of the 18–20 September 2026 Moscow Oblast Duma election in Domodedovsky constituency No.4
| Candidate | Party | Votes | % |
|---|---|---|---|
| Aleksandr Pashkov | United Russia | 53,971 | 48.36% |
| Anna Legostayeva | Communist Party | 16,565 | 14.84% |
| Marina Zlobina | New People | 13,918 | 12.47% |
| Aleksandr Rogov | Liberal Democratic Party | 13,076 | 11.72% |
| Konstantin Kish | A Just Russia | 7,308 | 6.55% |
| Angelina Gatina | Party of Pensioners | 4,827 | 4.33% |
| Total | | 111,601 | 100% |

==== District 5 ====
Summary of the 18–20 September 2026 Moscow Oblast Duma election in Yegoryevsky constituency No.5
| Candidate | Party | Votes | % |
|---|---|---|---|
| Vladimir Barsukov (incumbent) | Communist Party | 45,257 | 39.20% |
| Sergey Anikin | A Just Russia | 23,721 | 20.55% |
| Natalya Bondareva | New People | 21,680 | 18.78% |
| Andrey Chursin | Liberal Democratic Party | 12,764 | 11.06% |
| Vladimir Ovchinnikov | The Greens | 8,320 | 7.21% |
| Total | | 115,446 | 100% |

==== District 6 ====
Summary of the 18–20 September 2026 Moscow Oblast Duma election in Zvenigorodsky constituency No.6
| Candidate | Party | Votes | % |
|---|---|---|---|
| Olga Yermakova | United Russia | 64,793 | 51.30% |
| Stanislav Trunov | New People | 17,723 | 14.03% |
| Konstantin Kravchuk | Liberal Democratic Party | 15,077 | 11.94% |
| Marianna Kristalinskaya | The Greens | 13,246 | 10.49% |
| Vadim Popov | A Just Russia | 12,421 | 9.83% |
| Total | | 126,304 | 100% |

==== District 7 ====
Summary of the 18–20 September 2026 Moscow Oblast Duma election in Istrinsky constituency No.7
| Candidate | Party | Votes | % |
|---|---|---|---|
| Artur Badretdinov | United Russia | 90,136 | 57.11% |
| Vladimir Glotov | Communist Party | 17,570 | 11.13% |
| Natalya Potseluyeva | New People | 15,786 | 10.00% |
| Yulia Stepanova | Liberal Democratic Party | 15,154 | 9.60% |
| Nikolay Aksyonov | A Just Russia | 9,157 | 5.80% |
| Vladimir Lukyanov | The Greens | 4,389 | 2.78% |
| Ramil Mustafin | Party of Pensioners | 4,042 | 2.56% |
| Total | | 157,839 | 100% |

==== District 8 ====
Summary of the 18–20 September 2026 Moscow Oblast Duma election in Klinsky constituency No.8
| Candidate | Party | Votes | % |
|---|---|---|---|
| Aleksandr Zarubin | United Russia | 66,220 | 50.50% |
| Vadim Kukushkin | Communist Party | 23,535 | 17.95% |
| Vardan Tumanov | Liberal Democratic Party | 15,071 | 11.49% |
| Nikita Zuykov | A Just Russia | 9,893 | 7.54% |
| Yulia Kazakova | Party of Pensioners | 8,247 | 6.29% |
| Ivan Yadrikhinsky | The Greens | 6,407 | 4.89% |
| Total | | 131,130 | 100% |

==== District 9 ====
Summary of the 18–20 September 2026 Moscow Oblast Duma election in Korolyovsky constituency No.9
| Candidate | Party | Votes | % |
|---|---|---|---|
| Sergey Kerselyan (incumbent) | United Russia | 56,510 | 47.25% |
| Svetlana Petrova | Communist Party | 22,730 | 19.01% |
| Natalya Sinitsyna | New People | 13,720 | 11.47% |
| Anna Chukanina | A Just Russia | 12,705 | 10.62% |
| Tatyana Malakhova | Liberal Democratic Party | 6,160 | 5.15% |
| Stepan Solovyev | The Greens | 3,381 | 2.83% |
| Kirill Gorodko | Party of Pensioners | 3,208 | 2.68% |
| Total | | 119,598 | 100% |

==== District 10 ====
Summary of the 18–20 September 2026 Moscow Oblast Duma election in Leninsky constituency No.10
| Candidate | Party | Votes | % |
|---|---|---|---|
| Sergey Arbuzov | Liberal Democratic Party | 50,757 | 38.07% |
| Andrey Kolesnikov | Communist Party | 36,579 | 27.44% |
| Aleksandr Bogdanov | New People | 29,866 | 22.40% |
| Konstantin Koval | The Greens | 15,301 | 11.48% |
| Total | | 133,318 | 100% |

==== District 11 ====
Summary of the 18–20 September 2026 Moscow Oblast Duma election in Lyuberetsky constituency No.11
| Candidate | Party | Votes | % |
|---|---|---|---|
| Dmitry Denisko (incumbent) | United Russia | 66,858 | 49.76% |
| Aleksey Blinov | New People | 20,173 | 15.01% |
| Aleksey Nikonorov | Communist Party | 18,715 | 13.93% |
| Yevgeny Petrov | Liberal Democratic Party | 15,222 | 11.33% |
| Tatyana Sereda | The Greens | 5,604 | 4.17% |
| Yekaterina Kadenkova | A Just Russia | 4,030 | 3.00% |
| Yelena Kancheli | Party of Pensioners | 3,069 | 2.28% |
| Total | | 134,365 | 100% |

==== District 12 ====
Summary of the 18–20 September 2026 Moscow Oblast Duma election in Mytishchinsky constituency No.12
| Candidate | Party | Votes | % |
|---|---|---|---|
| Mikhail Murzakov (incumbent) | United Russia | 80,258 | 51.15% |
| Daniil Rendakov | Communist Party | 20,246 | 12.90% |
| Lev Shevtsov | Liberal Democratic Party | 19,028 | 12.13% |
| Vadim Kudryashov | New People | 15,717 | 10.02% |
| Viktor Soshin | A Just Russia | 11,466 | 7.31% |
| Andrey Lishin | The Greens | 7,520 | 4.79% |
| Total | | 156,897 | 100% |

==== District 13 ====
Summary of the 18–20 September 2026 Moscow Oblast Duma election in Naro-Fominsky constituency No.13
| Candidate | Party | Votes | % |
|---|---|---|---|
| Oleg Rozhnov (incumbent) | United Russia | 93,449 | 60.90% |
| Konstantin Chmarov | Communist Party | 18,612 | 12.13% |
| Galina Starkova | New People | 17,446 | 11.37% |
| Vitaly Vyshkvartsev | Liberal Democratic Party | 13,294 | 8.66% |
| Ivan Makoveychuk | A Just Russia | 8,281 | 5.40% |
| Total | | 153,439 | 100% |

==== District 14 ====
Summary of the 18–20 September 2026 Moscow Oblast Duma election in Noginsky constituency No.14
| Candidate | Party | Votes | % |
|---|---|---|---|
| Olga Popova | United Russia | 54,012 | 45.11% |
| Aleksandr Katsay | Communist Party | 18,275 | 15.26% |
| Olga Pliskovskaya | Liberal Democratic Party | 14,388 | 12.02% |
| Liana Slobodyanik | New People | 13,672 | 11.42% |
| Sergey Ivanov | A Just Russia | 9,195 | 7.68% |
| Anatoly Batashev | The Greens | 4,897 | 4.09% |
| Oleg Volyansky | Party of Pensioners | 4,147 | 3.46% |
| Total | | 119,747 | 100% |

==== District 15 ====
Summary of the 18–20 September 2026 Moscow Oblast Duma election in Orekhovo-Zuyevsky constituency No.15
| Candidate | Party | Votes | % |
|---|---|---|---|
| Eduard Zhivtsov (incumbent) | United Russia | 69,776 | 56.06% |
| Mikhail Belyayev | Communist Party | 16,554 | 13.30% |
| Artyom Gromakov | New People | 13,399 | 10.76% |
| Sergey Khalezin | Liberal Democratic Party | 12,519 | 10.06% |
| Denis Novikov | A Just Russia | 7,370 | 5.92% |
| Anastasia Chuvakova | The Greens | 4,416 | 3.55% |
| Total | | 124,469 | 100% |

==== District 16 ====
Summary of the 18–20 September 2026 Moscow Oblast Duma election in Podolsky constituency No.16
| Candidate | Party | Votes | % |
|---|---|---|---|
| Viktor Shchukin | United Russia | 62,255 | 48.53% |
| Andrey Cherepennikov | Communist Party | 24,714 | 19.26% |
| Yury Soldatov | New People | 16,065 | 12.52% |
| Andrey Gerasimov | Liberal Democratic Party | 12,242 | 9.54% |
| Anton Kharitonov | A Just Russia | 6,331 | 4.93% |
| Igor Kozlov | Party of Pensioners | 3,380 | 2.63% |
| Yelena Kotsyubinskaya | The Greens | 2,847 | 2.22% |
| Total | | 128,288 | 100% |

==== District 17 ====
Summary of the 18–20 September 2026 Moscow Oblast Duma election in Pushkinsky constituency No.17
| Candidate | Party | Votes | % |
|---|---|---|---|
| Inna Orlova | United Russia | 77,254 | 54.49% |
| Aleksandr Lifanov | Communist Party | 22,328 | 15.75% |
| Aleksandr Bryntsev | New People | 16,344 | 11.53% |
| Sergey Kotsoyev | Liberal Democratic Party | 11,712 | 8.26% |
| Olga Gabdrakhmanova | Party of Pensioners | 6,785 | 4.79% |
| Ivan Korshunov | The Greens | 5,751 | 4.06% |
| Total | | 141,764 | 100% |

==== District 18 ====
Summary of the 18–20 September 2026 Moscow Oblast Duma election in Ramensky constituency No.18
| Candidate | Party | Votes | % |
|---|---|---|---|
| Igor Chistyukhin (incumbent) | A Just Russia | 40,048 | 35.88% |
| Oleg Yemelyanov | Communist Party | 29,160 | 26.13% |
| Anna Telenkova | New People | 13,195 | 11.82% |
| Nikolay Bleskin | Liberal Democratic Party | 12,941 | 11.60% |
| Ruslan Shagin | Party of Pensioners | 7,233 | 6.48% |
| Vyacheslav Kozhukhar | The Greens | 7,202 | 6.45% |
| Total | | 111,601 | 100% |

==== District 19 ====
Summary of the 18–20 September 2026 Moscow Oblast Duma election in Reytovsky constituency No.19
| Candidate | Party | Votes | % |
|---|---|---|---|
| Igor Bryntsalov (incumbent) | United Russia | 67,997 | 52.14% |
| Artyom Konstantinovsky | Communist Party | 20,381 | 15.63% |
| Alla Khvastunova | New People | 15,623 | 11.98% |
| Vladimir Sinyakin | Liberal Democratic Party | 15,003 | 11.50% |
| Sergey Butusov | A Just Russia | 8,903 | 6.83% |
| Nikita Tamarkin | Party of Pensioners | 2,085 | 1.60% |
| Total | | 130,415 | 100% |

==== District 20 ====
Summary of the 18–20 September 2026 Moscow Oblast Duma election in Ruzsky constituency No.20
| Candidate | Party | Votes | % |
|---|---|---|---|
| Igor Vlasov | United Russia | 72,613 | 58.37% |
| Tamara Belyayeva | Communist Party | 15,348 | 12.34% |
| Yury Babich | Liberal Democratic Party | 11,182 | 8.99% |
| Anna Baranova | New People | 10,075 | 8.10% |
| Andrey Sorokin | A Just Russia | 7,231 | 5.81% |
| Lyudmila Aleksandrova | Party of Pensioners | 6,281 | 5.05% |
| Total | | 124,399 | 100% |

==== District 21 ====
Summary of the 18–20 September 2026 Moscow Oblast Duma election in Sergiyevo-Posadsky constituency No.21
| Candidate | Party | Votes | % |
|---|---|---|---|
| Timofey Lagutin | United Russia | 51,692 | 44.30% |
| Andrey Mardasov | A Just Russia | 23,885 | 20.47% |
| Aleksey Belozerov | Communist Party | 12,166 | 10.43% |
| Konstantin Samsonov | New People | 11,735 | 10.06% |
| Sergey Perepelkin | Liberal Democratic Party | 6,904 | 5.92% |
| Olga Solovyeva | The Greens | 4,107 | 3.52% |
| Sergey Bidin | Party of Pensioners | 3,548 | 3.04% |
| Total | | 116,692 | 100% |

==== District 22 ====
Summary of the 18–20 September 2026 Moscow Oblast Duma election in Stupinsky constituency No.22
| Candidate | Party | Votes | % |
|---|---|---|---|
| Andrey Golubev (incumbent) | United Russia | 59,327 | 54.17% |
| Rustam Volkov | Communist Party | 17,472 | 15.95% |
| Roman Ovchinnikov | A Just Russia | 9,223 | 8.42% |
| Vadim Ryabinin | Liberal Democratic Party | 9,000 | 8.22% |
| Konstantin Tereshchenko | New People | 8,946 | 8.17% |
| Marta Dorofeyeva | The Greens | 3,481 | 3.18% |
| Total | | 109,530 | 100% |

==== District 23 ====
Summary of the 18–20 September 2026 Moscow Oblast Duma election in Khimkinsky constituency No.23
| Candidate | Party | Votes | % |
|---|---|---|---|
| Nikolay Tomashov | United Russia | 49,246 | 41.21% |
| Vasily Stasyuk | Communist Party | 22,567 | 18.88% |
| Kirill Skvortsov | Liberal Democratic Party | 19,953 | 16.70% |
| Aleksandr Dyagilev | A Just Russia | 11,982 | 10.03% |
| Aleksandr Syrov | The Greens | 7,587 | 6.35% |
| Richard Garibyan | Party of Pensioners | 5,378 | 4.50% |
| Total | | 119,500 | 100% |

==== District 24 ====
Summary of the 18–20 September 2026 Moscow Oblast Duma election in Chekhovsky constituency No.24
| Candidate | Party | Votes | % |
|---|---|---|---|
| Aleksey Batogov | United Russia | 56,718 | 51.97% |
| Vladimir Volkov | Communist Party | 16,053 | 14.71% |
| Mikhail Kasatov | Liberal Democratic Party | 12,738 | 11.67% |
| Gleb Shibayev | New People | 9,840 | 9.02% |
| Aleksey Dolgov | A Just Russia | 7,035 | 6.45% |
| Aleksandr Tkachuk | Independent | 2,921 | 2.68% |
| Vladislav Lapshin | The Greens | 2,132 | 1.95% |
| Total | | 109,130 | 100% |

==== District 25 ====
Summary of the 18–20 September 2026 Moscow Oblast Duma election in Elektrostalsky constituency No.25
| Candidate | Party | Votes | % |
|---|---|---|---|
| Linara Samedinova (incumbent) | United Russia | 59,445 | 52.62% |
| Artyom Kovalev | New People | 14,713 | 13.02% |
| Aleksey Sivko | Communist Party | 14,454 | 12.79% |
| Stanislav Ganin | A Just Russia | 9,314 | 8.24% |
| Denis Tkachev | Liberal Democratic Party | 8,515 | 7.54% |
| Svetlana Pepelyayeva | The Greens | 5,749 | 5.09% |
| Total | | 112,971 | 100% |

=== Members ===
Incumbent deputies are highlighted with bold, elected members who declined to take a seat are marked with ~~strikethrough~~.

Constituency
| No. | Member | Party |
|---|---|---|
| 1 | Vladimir Shapkin | United Russia |
| 2 | Yekaterina Lobysheva | United Russia |
| 3 | Aleksandr Orlov | United Russia |
| 4 | Aleksandr Pashkov | United Russia |
| 5 | Vladimir Barsukov | Communist Party |
| 6 | Olga Yermakova | United Russia |
| 7 | Artur Badretdinov | United Russia |
| 8 | Aleksandr Zarubin | United Russia |
| 9 | Sergey Kerselyan | United Russia |
| 10 | Sergey Arbuzov | Liberal Democratic Party |
| 11 | Dmitry Denisko | United Russia |
| 12 | Mikhail Murzakov | United Russia |
| 13 | Oleg Rozhnov | United Russia |
| 14 | Olga Popova | United Russia |
| 15 | Eduard Zhivtsov | United Russia |
| 16 | Viktor Shchukin | United Russia |
| 17 | Inna Orlova | United Russia |
| 18 | Igor Chistyukhin | A Just Russia |
| 19 | Igor Bryntsalov | United Russia |
| 20 | Igor Vlasov | United Russia |
| 21 | Timofey Lagutin | United Russia |
| 22 | Andrey Golubev | United Russia |
| 23 | Nikolay Tomashov | United Russia |
| 24 | Aleksey Batogov | United Russia |
| 25 | Linara Samedinova | United Russia |

Party lists
| Member | Party |
|---|---|
| ~~Andrey Vorobyov~~ | United Russia |
| Sergey Peshkin | United Russia |
| Alexander Dvoinykh | United Russia |
| Mikhail Terentyev | United Russia |
| Denis Perepelitsyn | United Russia |
| Aleksandr Tolmachyov | United Russia |
| Asya Isayeva | United Russia |
| Oleg Zholobov | United Russia |
| Viktor Feoktistov | United Russia |
| Lidiya Antonova | United Russia |
| Roman Schamne | United Russia |
| Nikolay Govrichev | United Russia |
| Yekaterina Artemova | United Russia |
| Mikhail Zhdan | United Russia |
| Andrey Lazarev | United Russia |
| Vladimir Vshivtsev | United Russia |
| Maksim Korkin | United Russia |
| Yelena Serova | United Russia |
| Nikolay Vasilyev | Communist Party |
| Aleksandr Naumov | Communist Party |
| Yelena Mokrinskaya | Communist Party |
| Oleg Yemelyanov | Communist Party |
| ~~Leonid Slutsky~~ | Liberal Democratic Party |
| Vladimir Butenko | Liberal Democratic Party |
| Konstantin Nikolayev | Liberal Democratic Party |
| Lev Zakirov | New People |
| Aleksey Pylev | New People |

== See also ==
- 2026 Russian regional elections
