= Sergiyev Posad constituency =

Sergiyev Posad single-member constituency
- Constituency of the Russian State Duma
- Deputy: Sergey Pakhomov; United Russia
- Federal subject: Moscow Oblast
- Districts: Dubna, Pushkino, Sergiyev Posad, Taldom
- Voters: 507,289 (2026)

The Sergiyev Posad constituency (No.127 (Note: Pushkino constituency No.113 in 1995-2003, Pushkino constituency No.114 in 2003-2007, No.125 in 2016–2026)) is a Russian legislative constituency in Moscow Oblast. The constituency covers north-eastern Moscow Oblast.

The constituency has been represented since 2016 by United Russia deputy Sergey Pakhomov, former Head of Administration of Sergiyevo-Posadsky District and Chairman of the Ivanovo Oblast Duma. Pakhomov has been chairing the Duma Committee on Construction, and Housing and Communal Services since October 2021.

== Boundaries ==
1995–2007 Pushkino constituency: Balashikhinsky District, Ivanteyevka, Krasnoarmeysk, Pushkinsky District, Reutov, Shchyolkovsky District (Maltsevskoye, Zagoryansky, Zhigalovskoye), Zheleznodorzhny
The constituency was created following the 1995 redistricting from parts of former Noginsk and Shchyolkovo constituencies. This seat covered Moscow inner eastern suburbs Balashikha and Reutov as well as outer north-eastern suburbs Ivanteyevka and Pushkino, connected through a strap of ruralities in Shchyolkovsky District.

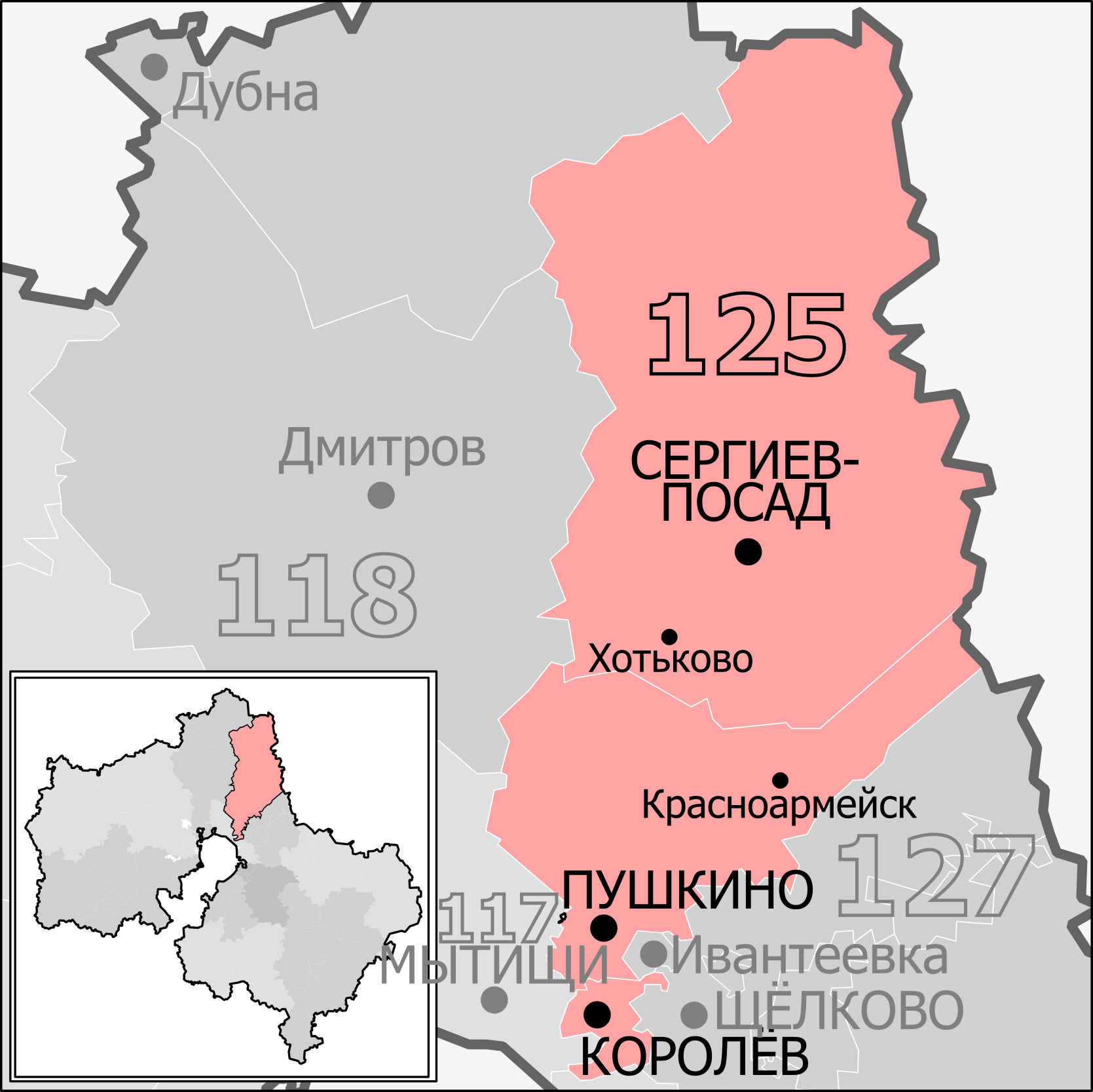
Constituency boundaries from 2016 to 2026

2016–2026: Korolyov, Krasnoarmeysk, Pushkino, Sergiyevo-Posadsky District
The constituency was re-created for the 2016 election under the name "Sergiyev Posad constituency" and retained only Krasnoarmeysk and Pushkino, losing Balashikha and Reutov to new Balashikha constituency, while Ivanteyevka and parts of Shchyolkovsky District were moved to re-created Shchyolkovo constituency. This seat instead gained Korolyov from Mytishchi constituency and Sergiyev Posad from Dmitrov constituency.

2026–present: Dubna, Pushkino, Sergiyev Posad, Taldom
After the 2025 redistricting the constituency was significantly changed, losing Korolyov to the re-created Mytishchi constituency. This seat gained Dubna and Taldom from Dmitrov constituency.

== Members elected ==
Election	Member	Party
1995	Svetlana Savitskaya	Communist Party
1999	Svetlana Savitskaya	Communist Party
2003	Dmitry Sablin	United Russia
2007	Proportional representation - no election by constituency	
2011	Proportional representation - no election by constituency	
2016	Sergey Pakhomov	United Russia
2021	Sergey Pakhomov	United Russia
2026	Sergey Pakhomov	United Russia

== Election results ==
=== 1995 ===
Summary of the 17 December 1995 Russian legislative election in the Pushkino constituency
Candidate	Party	Votes	%
Svetlana Savitskaya	Communist Party	72,189	23.16%
Aleksey Zakharov	Yabloko	35,677	11.45%
Vladimir Kurtashin	Our Home – Russia	26,477	8.50%
Valentina Martynova	Women of Russia	18,158	5.83%
Anatoly Voronin	Congress of Russian Communities	15,517	4.98%
Vyacheslav Kiselyov	Liberal Democratic Party	14,205	4.56%
Vladimir Grishin	Independent	12,124	3.89%
Stanislav Smirnov	Independent	11,836	3.80%
Cheslav Mlynnik	Union of Communists	10,330	3.31%
Anatoly Lobanov	Independent	7,480	2.40%
Vitaly Lagutin	Independent	6,492	2.08%
Zakhid Godzhayev	Democratic Choice of Russia – United Democrats	6,003	1.93%
Viktor Semyonov	Independent	5,930	1.90%
Igor Kravchenko	Independent	5,351	1.72%
Mikhail Sinitsyn	Independent	5,150	1.65%
Aleksandr Lobko	League of Independent Scientists	4,289	1.38%
Gennady Korsunov	For the Motherland!	4,152	1.33%
Aleksandr Belunik	Independent	4,151	1.33%
against all		36,850	11.82%
Total		311,648	100%

=== 1999 ===
Summary of the 19 December 1999 Russian legislative election in the Pushkino constituency
Candidate	Party	Votes	%
Svetlana Savitskaya (incumbent)	Communist Party	49,319	22.28%
Igor Bryntsalov	Russian Socialist Party	48,952	22.11%
Yevgeny Parkhayev	Independent	33,018	14.91%
Vladimir Ispravnikov	Independent	19,057	8.61%
Arkady Tsukanov	Independent	8,065	3.64%
Yury Grishin	Independent	7,564	3.42%
Vyacheslav Savinov	Unity	7,347	3.32%
Viktor Aksyuchits	Independent	3,405	1.54%
Aleksandr Lobko	For Civil Dignity	2,489	1.12%
Aleksey Vedenkin	Russian Patriotic Popular Movement	2,285	1.03%
Vladimir Feofanov	Independent	2,069	0.93%
Ivan Prikhodchenko	Congress of Russian Communities-Yury Boldyrev Movement	2,014	0.91%
against all		31,019	14.01%
Total		221,398	100%

=== 2003 ===
Summary of the 7 December 2003 Russian legislative election in the Pushkino constituency
Candidate	Party	Votes	%
Dmitry Sablin	United Russia	146,707	53.99%
Svetlana Savitskaya (incumbent)	Communist Party	34,912	12.85%
Svetlana Savitskaya	Independent	10,438	3.84%
Andrey Golovatyuk	Liberal Democratic Party	6,987	2.57%
Aleksandr Nikolayev	The Greens	5,675	2.09%
Anatoly Pchelintsev	United Russian Party Rus'	5,591	2.06%
Sergey Yefremov	Party of Russia's Rebirth-Russian Party of Life	4,432	1.63%
Yury Mishin	Creation	4,292	1.58%
against all		44,131	16.24%
Total		263,165	100%

=== 2016 ===
Summary of the 18 September 2016 Russian legislative election in the Sergiyev Posad constituency
Candidate	Party	Votes	%
Sergey Pakhomov	United Russia	88,536	47.39%
Anastasia Preobrazhenskaya	Communist Party	24,045	12.87%
Ivan Petrov	Liberal Democratic Party	16,473	8.82%
Sergey Kryzhov	Yabloko	9,346	5.00%
Vyacheslav Kovtun	A Just Russia	9,283	4.97%
Andrey Shalnev	People's Freedom Party	8,939	4.78%
Olga Boldyreva	Communists of Russia	8,909	4.77%
Tatyana Gorovets	Party of Growth	5,569	2.98%
Valery Kubarev	The Greens	3,683	1.97%
Vladimir Bobrovnik	Patriots of Russia	3,125	1.67%
Total		186,836	100%

=== 2021 ===
Summary of the 17-19 September 2021 Russian legislative election in the Sergiyev Posad constituency
Candidate	Party	Votes	%
Sergey Pakhomov (incumbent)	United Russia	101,361	45.00%
Andrey Mardasov	A Just Russia — For Truth	32,562	14.46%
Tatyana Ordynskaya	Communist Party	32,239	14.31%
Marianna Grigorovich	New People	9,920	4.40%
Svetlana Li	Party of Pensioners	9,555	4.24%
Eduard Perebikovsky	Liberal Democratic Party	9,375	4.16%
Sergey Zakharov	Rodina	8,244	3.66%
Sergey Kryzhov	Yabloko	5,780	2.57%
Mikhail Pogrebnoy	The Greens	4,365	1.94%
Valery Kyshev	Party of Growth	2,703	1.20%
Total		225,231	100%

=== 2026 ===
Summary of the 18-20 September 2026 Russian legislative election in the Sergiyev Posad constituency
Candidate	Party	Votes	%
Sergey Pakhomov (incumbent)	United Russia	135,275	53.58%
Denis Akhromkin	Communist Party	35,407	14.02%
Konstantin Samsonov	New People	24,799	9.82%
Andrey Tumanov	A Just Russia	21,557	8.54%
Sergey Perepelkin	Liberal Democratic Party	19,737	7.82%
Anatoly Batashev	The Greens	9,933	3.93%
Total		252,460	100%
