= Sablino =

Sablino (Russian: Саблино) is the name of several rural localities in Russia:

- Sablino, Moscow Oblast, a village in Zaraysky District of Moscow Oblast
- Sablino, Orenburg Oblast, a selo in Grachyovsky District of Orenburg Oblast
