= Ivanteyevka =

Ivanteyevka (Russian: Ивантеевка) is the name of several inhabited localities in Russia.

Urban localities

- Ivanteyevka, Moscow Oblast, a town in Moscow Oblast; administratively incorporated as a town under oblast jurisdiction

Rural localities

- Ivanteyevka, Saratov Oblast, a selo in Ivanteyevsky District of Saratov Oblast
