= Viktor Abramov =

Russian politician (born 1956)

- Виктор Абрамов
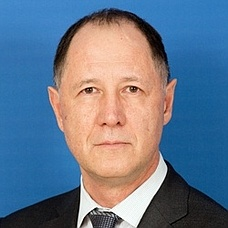

Russian Federation Senator from Moscow Oblast
- In office 29 September 2016 – 30 September 2021
- Appointed by: Moscow Oblast Duma
- Preceded by: Lidiya Antonova
- Succeeded by: Alexander Dvoinykh

Russian Federation Senator from Tver Oblast
- In office 20 December 2011 – 26 September 2016
- Appointed by: Andrey Shevelyov
- Preceded by: Vladimir Savin
- Succeeded by: Vladimir Lukin
- In office 29 January 2004 – 2 December 2007
- Appointed by: Dmitry Zelenin
- Preceded by: Anatoly Dubodel
- Succeeded by: Vladimir Savin

Personal details
- Born: 18 August 1956 (age 69) Min-Kush, Kirghiz SSR, Soviet Union
- Party: United Russia

Viktor Semyonovich Abramov (Russian: Виктор Семёнович Абрамов; born 18 August 1956, Min-Kush, Kyrgyzstan) is a Russian politician. He was a deputy of the 5th State Duma from the United Russia party. From 2004 to 2007 and from 2011 to 2016, he served as a member of the Federation Council representing the executive branch of the government of Tver Oblast; from 2016 to 2021, he represented the legislative branch of the government of Moscow Oblast.

Early life and education

Abramov graduated from the Moscow Aviation Institute with a degree as an engineer-economist.

Political career

In 2004, he became a member of the Federation Council of Russia representing Tver Oblast. In the 2007 elections, Abramov was elected to the State Duma on the United Russia party list.

He later served as Deputy Chairman of the State Duma Committee on Financial Markets.

== Awards and Titles ==
- Order of Honour (March 20, 2017) — for significant contribution to the development of Russian parliamentarism and active legislative work
- Order of Friendship (January 9, 2010) — for merits in legislative activity and the development of Russian parliamentarism
- Certificate of Honour of the Government of the Russian Federation (15 July 2010) — for merits in legislative activity and many years of conscientious work.
