= Sergei Malikov =

Russian regional politician

- Сергей Анатольевич Маликов

Member of the Moscow Oblast Duma
- In office 2021 – 25 September 2025

Personal details
- Party: United Russia (until 2025)
- Website: malikovsa.ru

Sergei Malikov (Russian: Сергей Анатольевич Маликов) is a Russian regional politician who served as a member of the Moscow Oblast Duma until his mandate was terminated on 25 September 2025.

In May–June 2025, he was expelled from United Russia and from its faction in the regional parliament.
