= Nikolay Vasiliev (Russian politician) =

Russian politician

Nikolay Vasiliev MP
- Николай Васильев
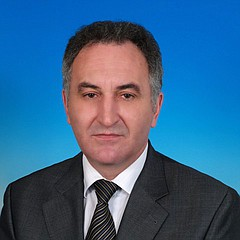

Member of the State Duma (Party List Seat)
- Incumbent
- Assumed office 12 October 2021
- In office 21 December 2011 – 5 October 2016

Personal details
- Born: 28 March 1958 (age 68) Grachyovsky District, Orenburg Oblast, RSFSR, USSR
- Party: Communist Party of the Russian Federation
- Children: 5
- Education: State University of Management

Nikolay Ivanovich Vasiliev (Russian: Николай Иванович Васильев; born 28 March 1958, Grachyovsky District, Orenburg Oblast) is a Russian political figure and a deputy of the 6th and 8th State Dumas.

After graduating from the State University of Management, Vasiliev worked at the Dolgoprudnenskoe Scientific Production Plant. Later he worked at the Government of the Moscow Oblast as an advisor to the deputy of the State Duma. From 2007 to 2011, he was the deputy of the Moscow Oblast Duma. In 2011, he became the deputy of the 6th State Duma. On September 18, 2016, he was elected deputy of the Moscow Oblast Duma. Since September 2021, he has served as deputy of the 8th State Duma.

== Sanctions ==
He was sanctioned by the UK government in 2022 in relation to the Russo-Ukrainian War.
