= Sergey Zhigarev =

Russian politician

- Сергей Жигарев
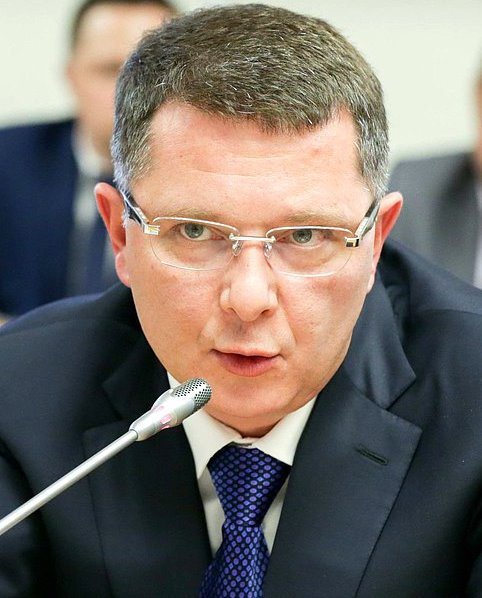

Member of the State Duma for Moscow Oblast
- In office 5 October 2016 – 12 October 2021
- Preceded by: constituency re-established
- Succeeded by: Aleksandr Tolmachyov
- Constituency: Shchyolkovo (No. 127)

Member of the State Duma (Party List Seat)
- In office 21 December 2011 – 5 October 2016

Chairman of the State Duma Committee on Economic Policy, Industry, Innovative Development and Entrepreneurship
- In office May 2012 – By 2021

Member of the National Banking Council of Russia

Personal details
- Born: 31 March 1969 (age 57) Moscow, RSFSR, USSR
- Party: LDPR (from 2011); A Just Russia (until 2011)
- Relatives: Vsevolod Bobrov (great-grandfather)
- Education: Financial University under the Government of the Russian Federation (2005)

Sergei Aleksandroviсh Zhigarev (Russian: Сергей Александрович Жигарев; born 25 June 1969) is a Russian ex politician. He was a deputy of the 7th State Duma of the Russian Federation until 2021. He had been elected to the 6th State Duma of the Russian Federation in 2011 as a representative of the Shchyolkovo constituency, and was re-elected in 2016.

== Biography ==
Zhigarev was born in Moscow. He graduated from the Financial University under the Government of the Russian Federation with the degree Candidate of Economic Sciences in 2005.

Prior to election to the State Duma, Zhigarev was a deputy of the Moscow Oblast Duma.

=== State Duma of the Russian Federation ===
In 2011, Zhigarev was elected as a deputy in the State Duma, the lower house of the Federal Assembly of Russia, as a representative for the Shchelkovsky constituency in Moscow. He was elected to a second term commencing 18 September 2016. He was also the chairman of the State Duma Committee on Economic Policy, Industry, Innovative Development and Entrepreneurship.

As Deputy Chairman of the State Duma Committee on Defense, Zhigarev was involved in the committee's work on defense policy.

== Family and Property ==
In 2010, Forbes magazine estimated his family's income at 38.79 million rubles. It was also reported that they owned nine real estate properties and four vehicles. In his 2010 election declaration, Zhigarev reported an income of approximately 1.5 million rubles and a bank account with 624,300 rubles. In his 2020 declaration, he declared an income of 295 million rubles.

Zhigarev’s eldest son, Kirill Zhigarev, served as a deputy of the Moscow Regional Duma in the 5th, 6th, and 7th convocations, elected through the regional list of the LDPR party. During the 6th and 7th convocations, he held the position of head of the LDPR faction and Deputy Chairman of the Moscow Regional Duma. He also served as coordinator of the LDPR regional office in the Moscow Region. In early 2024, he resigned early from his position as a deputy of the Moscow Regional Duma and joined the Government of the Moscow Region.

== Links ==
Personal web site.
