= Shchyolkovsky =

Shchyolkovsky/Shchelkovsky (masculine), Shchyolkovskaya/Shchelkovskaya, or Shchyolkovskoye/Shchelkovskoye (neuter) may refer to:

- Shchyolkovsky District, a district of Moscow Oblast, Russia
- Shchyolkovskaya, a station of the Moscow Metro, Moscow, Russia
