= Alexei Leonov (disambiguation) =

Alexei Leonov (born 1934–2019) was a Soviet and Russian cosmonaut, Air Force major general, writer, and artist.

Alexei Leonov may also refer to:

- Aleksei Leonov (footballer) (born 1977), Russian footballer
- Aleksei Leonov (archer) (born 1987), Russian Paralympic archer
