= Grachyovka, Grachyovsky District, Orenburg Oblast =

Rural locality in Orenburg Oblast, Russia

Coordinates: 52°55′29″N 52°52′25″E

Grachyovka (Russian: Грачѐвка) is a rural locality (a selo) and the administrative center of Grachyovsky District, Orenburg Oblast, Russia. Population: 6,122 (2010 census); 6,521 (2002 census); 6,147 (1989 Soviet census).
