= Aleksandr Vorobyov (politician) =

Russian politician

- Александр Николаевич Воробьёв

Member of the State Duma
- Incumbent
- Assumed office 2026
- Preceded by: Oleg Nilov

Personal details
- Born: 13 March 1970 (age 56)
- Party: A Just Russia

Alexander Nikolaevich Vorobyov (born 13 March 1970) is a Russian politician who has been a member of the State Duma since 2026. He is a candidate in the 2026 Moscow Oblast legislative election.

== See also ==
- 8th State Duma
