= Sergey Pakhomov =

Russian politician

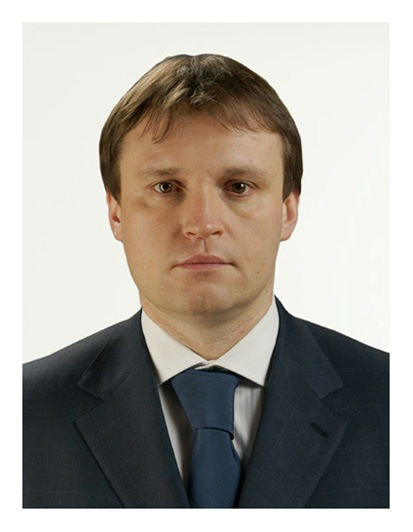

Chairman of the State Duma сommittee of the on construction and housing and communal services
- Incumbent
- Assumed office 12 October 2021
- Preceded by: position was established

Deputy of the State Duma Russia
- Incumbent
- Assumed office 18 September 2016
- Preceded by: constituency re-established
- Constituency: Sergiyev Posad (No. 125)

Head Sergiyev Posada
- In office 16 February 2014 – 23 September 2016
- Governor: Andrey Vorobyov
- Preceded by: constituency re-established
- Succeeded by: Mikhail Tokarev

Personal details
- Born: 6 August 1975 (age 51) Zagorsk, Moscow Oblast, Russian SFSR, USSR
- Party: United Russia
- Education: Moscow Finance and Law University

Sergei Aleksandrovich Pakhomov (Russian: Сергей Александрович Пахомов; born August 8, 1975, Zagorsk, Moscow Oblast) is a Russian political. Chairman of the State Duma Russia сommittee of the on construction and housing and communal services from 12 October 2021.

Deputy of the 7th and 8th State Dumas. In 2005, Pahomov was granted a Candidate of Sciences in History degree.

== Biografy ==
In 2004, Pakhomov joined the United Russia. The same year, he started working at the Government of the Moscow Oblast. In 2005, Pakhomov served at the Government of Moscow and, later, at the Government of Ivanovo Oblast. From 2005 to 2008, he was the Deputy Chairman of the Government of the Ivanovo Oblast, Head of the Public Relations and Regional Policy Complex. From 2008 to 2013, he was the deputy and the chairman of the Ivanovo Oblast Duma of the 5th and 6th convocations. In December 2013, Pkhomov was appointed the First Deputy Head of Administration of the Sergiyevo-Posadsky District. He headed the district from February 16, 2014, to September 23, 2016. In September 2016, he was elected deputy of the 7th State Duma. In 2021, he was re-elected for the 8th State Duma from the Sergiyev-Posad constituency.
