= Aleksandr Tolmachyov (politician) =

Russian politician

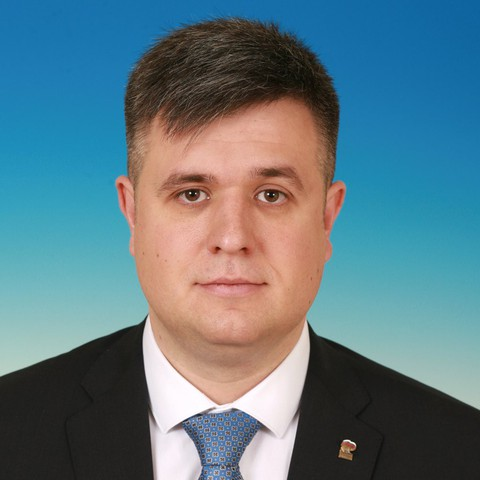

Deputy of the State Duma Russia
- Incumbent
- Assumed office 19 September 2021
- Preceded by: Sergey Zhigarev
- Constituency: Shchyolkovo (No. 127)

Personal details
- Born: 7 April 1993 (age 33) Lukhovitsy, Russia
- Party: United Russia
- Education: State Social and Humanitarian University

Aleksandr Romanovich Tolmachyov (Russian: Александр Романович Толмачёв; born 7 April 1993, Lukhovitsy) is a Russian political. Deputy of the State Duma Russia from 19 September 2021.

Deputy chairman of the State Duma Russia committee on Youth Polic from 12 October 2021.

== Biografy ==
From 2014 to 2015, Tolmachyov worked as director of the Youth center "Unimaks". In 2016, he was elected Deputy of the Council of Deputies of the Lukhovitsky District of the Moscow Oblast. The same year, he became an assistant to the deputy of the Moscow Oblast Duma Evgeny Aksakov, as well as an assistant to the deputy of the State Duma Yelena Serova. From February 2018 to February 2019, Tolmachev was the Deputy Head of the Moscow Regional Branch of the All-Russian Public Organization Young Guard of United Russia. On July 10, 2019, he was appointed Head of the Moscow Oblast Branch of the Young Guard of United Russia. Since September 2021, he has served as deputy of the 8th State Duma. He co-authored the draft law on compulsory insurance of volunteer lives and health. In April 2022, Tolmachyov was sanctioned by United States.
