= Alexander Dvoinykh =

Russian politician

- Александр Двойных
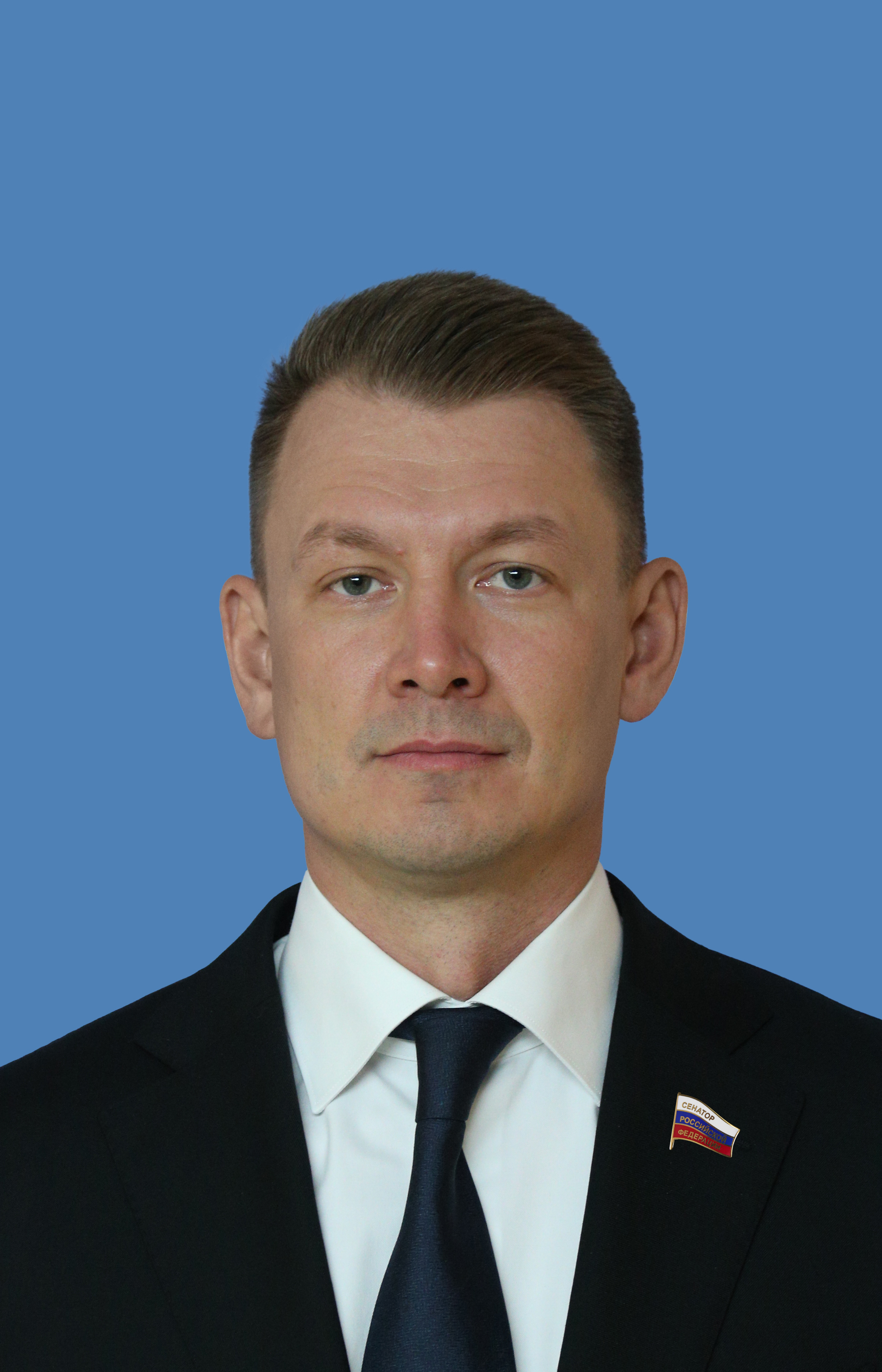
- Dvoinykh in 2021

Senator from the Moscow Oblast Duma
- Incumbent
- Assumed office 30 September 2021
- Preceded by: Viktor Abramov

Personal details
- Born: Alexander Dvoinykh; 19 January 1984 (age 42) Sergiyev Posad, Russian Soviet Federative Socialist Republic, Soviet Union
- Party: United Russia
- Education: Moscow Polytechnic University

Alexander Vladimirovich Dvoinykh (Russian: Александр Владимирович Двойных, romanized: Aleksandr Vladimirovich Dvoynykh; born 19 January 1984) is a Russian politician serving as a senator from the Moscow Oblast Duma since 30 September 2021.

Alexander Dvoinykh is under personal sanctions introduced by the European Union, the United Kingdom, the USA, Canada, Switzerland, Australia, Ukraine, New Zealand, for ratifying the decisions of the "Treaty of Friendship, Cooperation and Mutual Assistance between the Russian Federation and the Donetsk People's Republic and between the Russian Federation and the Luhansk People's Republic" and providing political and economic support for Russia's annexation of Ukrainian territories.

== Biography ==
Alexander Vladimirovich Dvoinykh was born on 19 January 1984 in Sergiyev Posad. In 2006, he graduated from the Moscow Polytechnic University. In 2016, he also received a degree from the Russian Presidential Academy of National Economy and Public Administration. From 2009 to 2011, he was the deputy of the Council of Deputies of the urban settlement of Sergiev Posad of the 2nd convocation. On 4 December 2011, he was elected deputy of the Moscow Oblast Duma from the Sergiyev Posad okrug. On 30 September 2021, he became the senator from the Moscow Oblast Duma.
