= Lidiya Antonova =

Russian politician

- Лидия Антонова
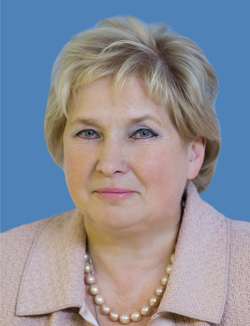

Member of the Moscow Oblast Duma
- Incumbent
- Assumed office 2021

Member of State Duma
- In office 18 September 2016 – 2021

Member of the Federation Council
- In office 9 October 2014 – 18 Septepmber 2016
- Preceded by: Valery Asakov
- Succeeded by: Viktor Abramov

Personal details
- Born: 15 May 1950 (age 76) Kraskovo, Moscow Oblast, Soviet Union
- Party: United Russia
- Education: Moscow Regional Pedagogical Institute

Lidiya Nikolaevna Antonova (Russian: Лидия Николаевна Антонова; born May 15, 1950, Kraskovo, Moscow Oblast) is a Russian politician. She is a secretary of the Moscow Regional Branch of the United Russia party. She is a full member of the Russian Academy of Education, professor, member of the Presidium of the Russian Academy of Education and Doctor of Pedagogical Sciences. From September 18, 2016 to 2021, she has been a deputy of the State Duma of the VII convocation, a member of the United Russia faction. Member of the State Duma Committee on Education and Science. In 1973, she graduated from the Krupskaya Moscow Regional Pedagogical Institute with a degree in English language teaching.

== Biography ==
From 1967 to 1972 she worked as laboratory assistant, technician at the All-Union Lenin Electrotechnical Institute From 1972 to 1989 she worked as extended day care group teacher, English teacher at Malakhovskie Secondary Schools No. 49 and No. 46 in Lyubertsy District. From 1989 to 1991 she served as Chairman of the Lyubertsy City Committee of the Trade Unions of Education and Science Workers. From 1991 to 1997 she served as Head of the Lyubertsy District Education Department, Chairman of the Education Committee of the Lyubertsy District Administration. In 1997-1997 she served as chief Specialist in International Relations at the Institute for Advanced Training and Retraining of Public Education Workers in Moscow Oblast. In 1997-1998 she worked as Chief Referent at Vityaz CJSC in Moscow.

1998-2000 she worked as General Director of the Center for International Academic and Exchange Programs Foundation, founder of the Department of Education of Moscow Oblast. From 2000 to 2012 she served as Minister of Education at the Government of Moscow Oblast. From November 2012 to 2014 she served as First Deputy Chairman of the Government of Moscow Oblast.

From October 9, 2014 to September 17, 2016 she was a member of the Federation Council of the Federal Assembly from the legislative body of Moscow Oblast. By Resolution of the Federation Council No. 447-SF dated September 28, 2016, the powers of L. N. Antonova as a member of the Federation Council were prematurely terminated on September 18, 2016.

From 2016 to 2021 she served as deputy of the State Duma of the Federal Assembly, member of the State Duma Committee on Education and Science.

Since 2021 she is deputy of the Moscow Oblast Duma of the 7th convocation.

During the exercise of powers as a deputy of the State Duma, from 2016 to 2019, she co-authored 7 legislative initiatives and amendments to draft federal laws.

== Legislative Activity ==
During her tenure as a deputy of the State Duma from 2016 to 2019, she co-authored 7 legislative initiatives and amendments to draft federal laws.

== Awards ==
- Order of Honour (2009)
- Order of Ivan Kalita
- Medal "For Impeccable Service" of Moscow Oblast
- Badge "For Services to the Moscow Oblast", 2nd degree (May 19, 2015) - for services in the socio-economic development of the Moscow Oblast
- Badge of the Governor of the Moscow Oblast "For Usefulness"
- Badge of the Governor of the Moscow Oblast "For Labor and Diligence"
- Order of the Holy Equal-to-the-Apostles Princess Olga of the Russian Orthodox Church
- Honoured Teacher of the Russian Federation (2003)
- Honored Worker of Education of the Moscow Oblast
- Honorary Citizen of the Moscow Oblast (2016)
- Badge of St. Sergius of Radonezh (2020)
- Jubilee Medal "IPA CIS. 25 years" (October 13, 2017) - for services in the development and strengthening of parliamentarism, for contribution to the development and improvement of the legal foundations for the functioning of the Commonwealth of Independent States, strengthening international relations and inter-parliamentary cooperation
