= Aleksei Leonov (footballer) =

Russian footballer

Personal information
- Full name: Aleksei Nikolayevich Leonov
- Date of birth: 21 January 1977 (age 49)
- Place of birth: Losino-Petrovsky, Moscow Oblast, Russian SFSR
- Height: 1.77 m (5 ft 9 1/2 in)
- Position: Midfielder

Youth career
- 1995–1996: Spartak Moscow

Senior career*
| Years | Team | Apps | (Gls) |
| 1996–1997 | Roda Moscow | 72 | (3) |
| 1998 | Spartak-2 Moscow | 31 | (1) |
| 1999 | Dinaburg Daugavpils | 2 | (0) |
| 2000–2003 | Mosenergo Moscow | 139 | (3) |
| 2004 | MTZ-RIPO Minsk | 10 | (1) |
| 2005–2006 | Fortuna Mytishchi | 34 | (4) |
| 2007 | Reutov | 29 | (1) |
| 2008 | Spartak Shchyolkovo | 34 | (1) |
| 2009–2010 | Olimp-SKOPA Zheleznodorozhny | 24 | (0) |
| 2011 | Lyubertsy | 22 | (0) |
- * Club domestic league appearances and goals

Aleksei Nikolayevich Leonov (Russian: Алексей Николаевич Леонов; born 21 January 1977) is a former Russian professional footballer.
