= Ivanteyevsky District =

Ivanteyevsky District Ивантеевский район (Russian)
- District
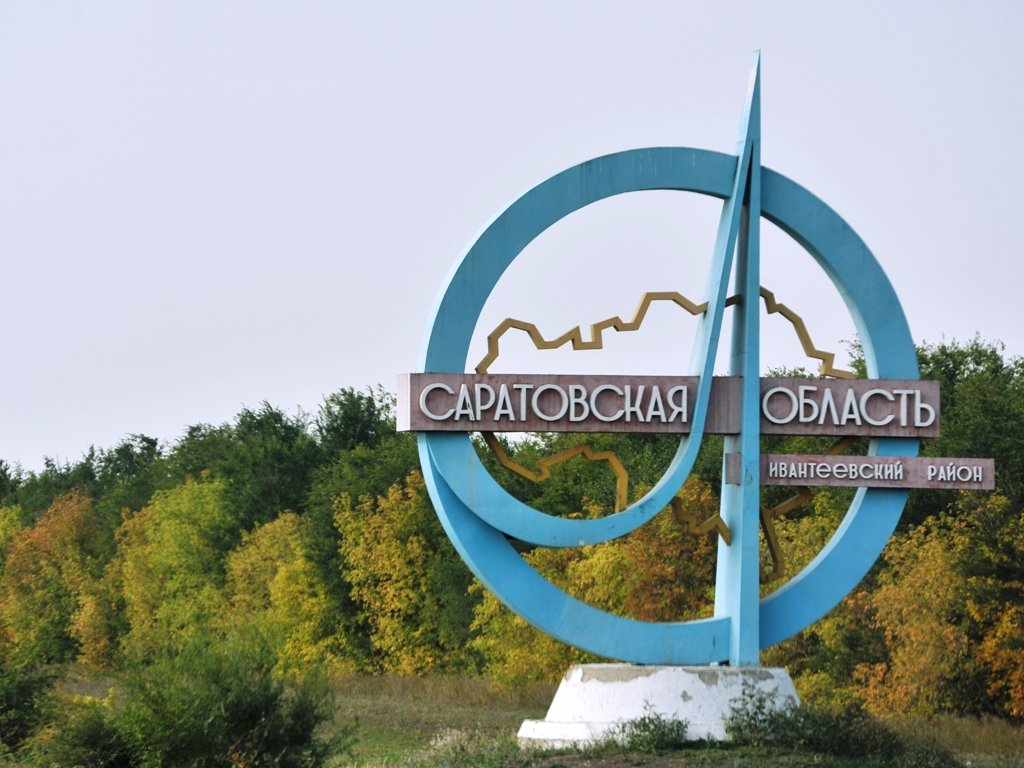
- Entrance to Ivanteyevsky District

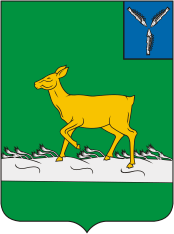
- Coat of arms
- Location of Ivanteyevsky District in Saratov Oblast
- Coordinates: 52°16′N 49°05′E
- Country: Russia
- Federal subject: Saratov Oblast
- Established: 23 July 1928
- Administrative center: Ivanteyevka

Area
  - Total: 2,000 km^{2} (770 sq mi)

Population (2010 Census)
  - Total: 15,186
  - Density: 7.6/km^{2} (20/sq mi)
  - Urban: 0%
  - Rural: 100%

Administrative structure
  - Inhabited localities: 26 rural localities

Municipal structure
  - Municipally incorporated as: Ivanteyevsky Municipal District
  - Municipal divisions: 0 urban settlements, 9 rural settlements
- Time zone: UTC+4 (MSK+1)
- OKTMO ID: 63619000
- Website: http://ivanteevka.sarmo.ru/

Ivanteyevsky District (Russian: Ивантеевский райо́н) is an administrative and municipal district (raion), one of the thirty-eight in Saratov Oblast, Russia. It is located in the northeast of the oblast. The area of the district is 2,000 square kilometers (770 sq mi). Its administrative center is the rural locality (a selo) of Ivanteyevka. Population: 15,186 (2010 Census); 16,151 (2002 census); 15,972 (1989 Soviet census). The population of Ivanteyevka accounts for 40.2% of the district's total population.
