= Ivanteyevka, Saratov Oblast =

Rural locality in Saratov Oblast, Russia

Coordinates: 52°16′09″N 49°06′15″E

Ivanteyevka (Russian: Ивантеевка) is a rural locality (a selo) and the administrative center of Ivanteyevsky District, Saratov Oblast, Russia. Population: 6,100 (2010 Census); 6,173 (2002 Census); 6,224 (1989 Soviet census).
