= Yevgeny Khoroshevtsev =

Russian MC (1944–2020)

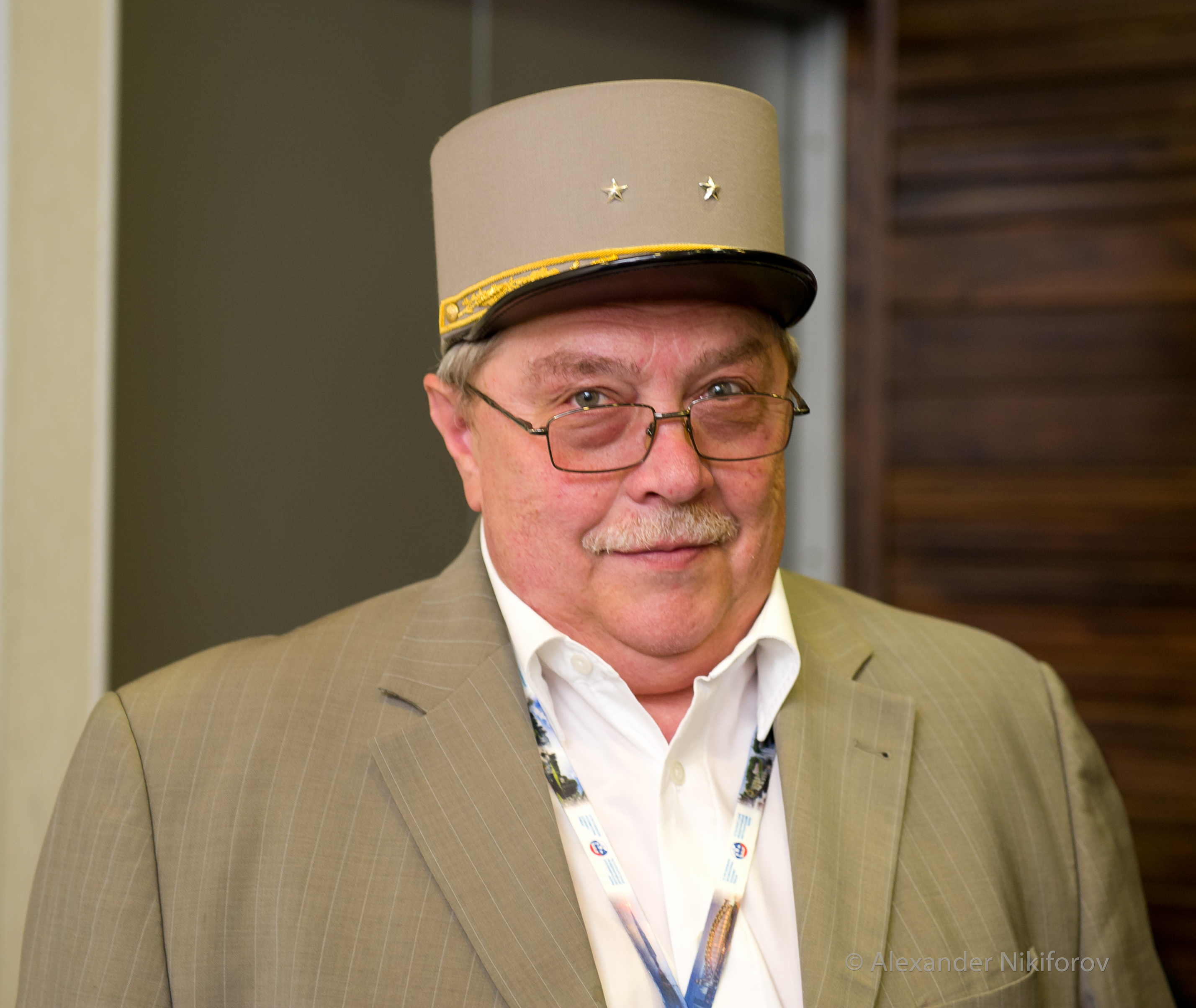
Yevgeny Khoroshevtsev

Yevgeny Alexandrovich Khoroshevtsev (Russian: Евгений Александрович Хорошевцев; 23 July 1944 – 13 December 2020) was a Russian MC who was the main narrator for official events in Russia. In his position as announcer of protocol events of the President of the Russian Federation, he was the well known as the voice of military parades, state ceremonies, and public festivals. He is a People's Artist of Russia.

== Biography ==
He was born on July 23, 1944, in Moscow. At the age of nine, he began to study in the theater studio of the Knipper of the House of Culture in Moscow. He is a graduate of the Russian Institute of Theatre Arts. In 1968, he became director of the All-Union Radio, and together with Yuri Levitan, he narrated festive demonstrations dedicated to International Workers' Day and October Revolution Day, reading out the slogans and appeals of the CPSU Central Committee, accompanying them with a loud "Hurray!". From 1996 to 1997, he was General Director of the nationwide Radio-1. From 2003 to 2004, he was the head of the radio station RTV-Podmoskovye.

From May 2000 to December 2020, Khoroshevtsev worked as an announcer of protocol events for the President of the Russian Federation (serving under Vladimir Putin and Dmitry Medvedev).

He died from complications of COVID-19 in Moscow, on December 13, 2020, at the age of 77, during the COVID-19 pandemic in Russia. He was buried on December 15 at the Troyekurovskoye Cemetery.

== Activities ==
=== Military parades ===
From 2007 to 2020, he has been the MC for the Moscow Victory Day Parade on Red Square. The idea was conceived by President Vladimir Putin in 2005, after having been to a dress rehearsal for the 2005 parade. After two years later, Khoroshevtsev's recorded audio became the one used to announce the parade formations marching on the grounds of the square. Aside from this parade, he also, together with Anna Shatilova, was the MC for the memorial parade in honor of the 1941 October Revolution Parade as well as the Spasskaya Tower Military Music Festival and Tattoo. After his death, the announcer for the parade became his protégé, Anton Suntsov.

=== Acting ===
- Bear, Seryoga and I (1960)
- This fantastic world. Volume 11: The Case of Colonel Darwin - Dr. Scott (1985)
- Hokkaido Police - FSB General (2008)

=== Other ===
He was a member of the Public Council at the Main Directorate of the Ministry of Internal Affairs of Russia.

== Awards ==
- Honored Artist of the RSFSR (1990)
- People's Artist of the Russian Federation (2001)
- Order of Honor (2010)
- Order of Friendship (2014)
