= Losino-Petrovsky =

Town in Moscow Oblast, Russia

Losino-Petrovsky Лосино-Петровский
- Town
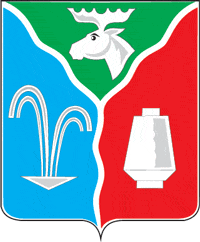
- Flag Coat of arms
- Interactive map of Losino-Petrovsky
- Location of Losino-Petrovsky Losino-Petrovsky (Moscow Oblast)
- Coordinates: 55°52′28″N 38°12′06″E
- Country: Russia
- Federal subject: Moscow Oblast
- Founded: 1708
- Town status since: 1951
- Elevation: 140 m (460 ft)

Population (2010 Census)
  - Total: 22,550
  - Estimate (2025): 29,831 (+32.3%)

Administrative status
  - Subordinated to: Losino-Petrovsky Town Under Oblast Jurisdiction
  - Capital of: Losino-Petrovsky Town Under Oblast Jurisdiction

Municipal status
  - Urban okrug: Losino-Petrovsky Urban Okrug
  - Capital of: Losino-Petrovsky Urban Okrug
- Time zone: UTC+3 (MSK)
- Postal code: 141151
- OKTMO ID: 46742000001

Losino-Petrovsky (Russian: Лоси́но-Петро́вский) is a town in Moscow Oblast, Russia, located at the confluence of the Vorya and Klyazma Rivers 52 kilometers (32 mi) northeast of Moscow. Population: 22,550 (2010 census); 22,324 (2002 census); 22,906 (1989 Soviet census).

== History ==
In 1708, a manufacture for producing elk leather uniforms was established by Peter the Great. The sloboda around the manufacture was named Losinaya Petrovskaya (Лоси́ная Петро́вская). The manufacture existed until 1858, by which time several other textile factories were established. In 1928, the sloboda was granted urban-type settlement status, and in 1951—town status.

== Administrative and municipal status ==
Within the framework of administrative divisions, it is incorporated as Losino-Petrovsky Town Under Oblast Jurisdiction—an administrative unit with the status equal to that of the districts. As a municipal division, Losino-Petrovsky Town Under Oblast Jurisdiction is incorporated as Losino-Petrovsky Urban Okrug.

== Notable people ==
- Aleksei Nikolayevich Leonov (born 1977), footballer
- Aleksandr Markin (born 1962), hurdler
