= Balashikhinsky District =

Former administrative and municipal district of Moscow Oblast, Russia

Coordinates: 55°48′N 37°56′E

Balashikhinsky District (Russian: Балашихинский райо́н) was an administrative and municipal district (raion) of Moscow Oblast, Russia. Its administrative center was the city of Balashikha. Population: 225,381 (2010 Census); 187,988 (2002 Census); 31,964 (1989 Soviet census). The population of Balashikha accounted for 95.6% of the district's total population.

It existed in 1941-2011 (with the exception of 1963-1965). In 1929-1941 it was a Reutovsky district.

The district was abolished on January 1, 2011 and reorganized as Balashikha City Under Oblast Jurisdiction.
