= Shchyolkovo =

City in Moscow Oblast, Russia

Shchyolkovo Щёлково
- City
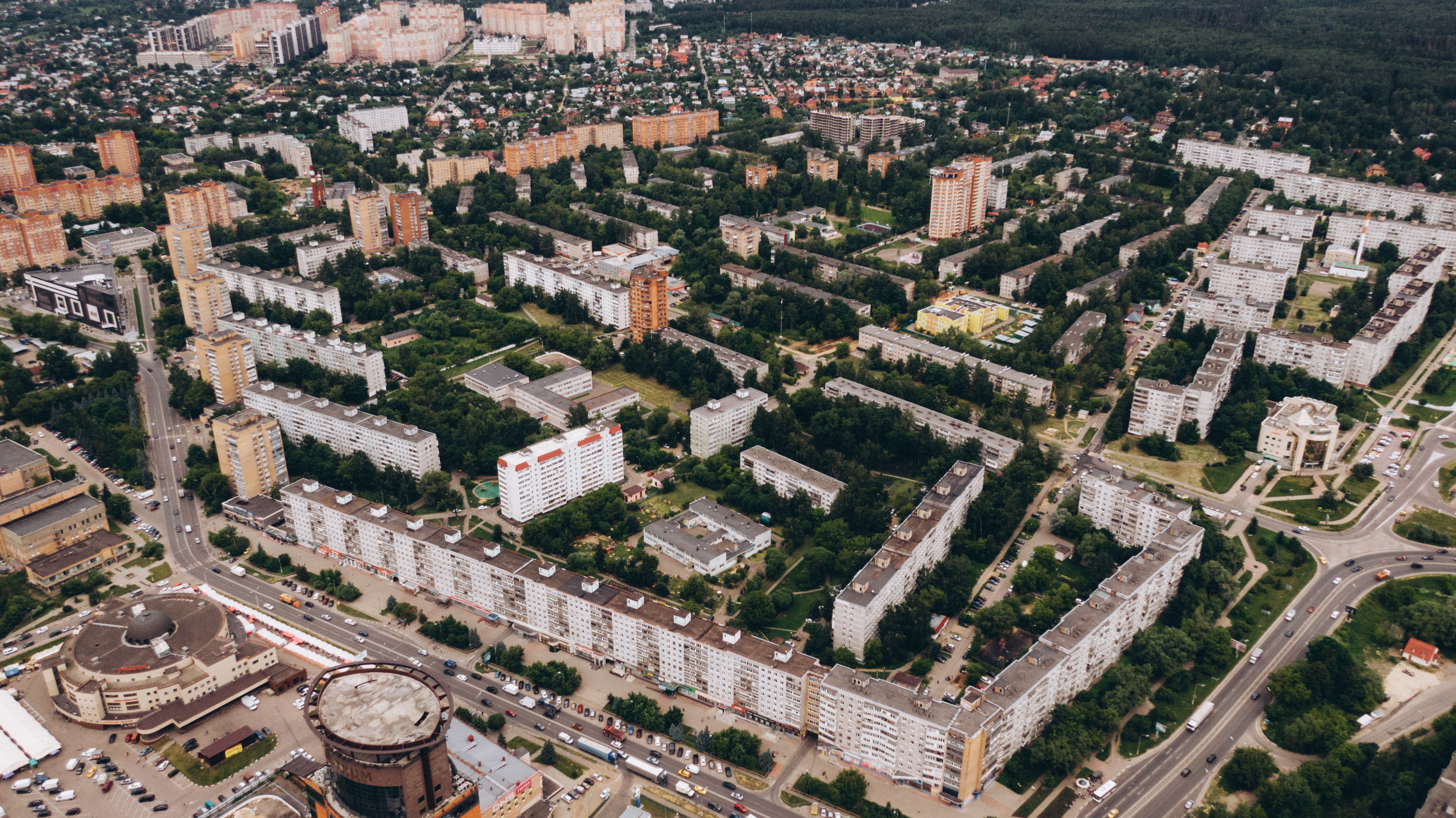

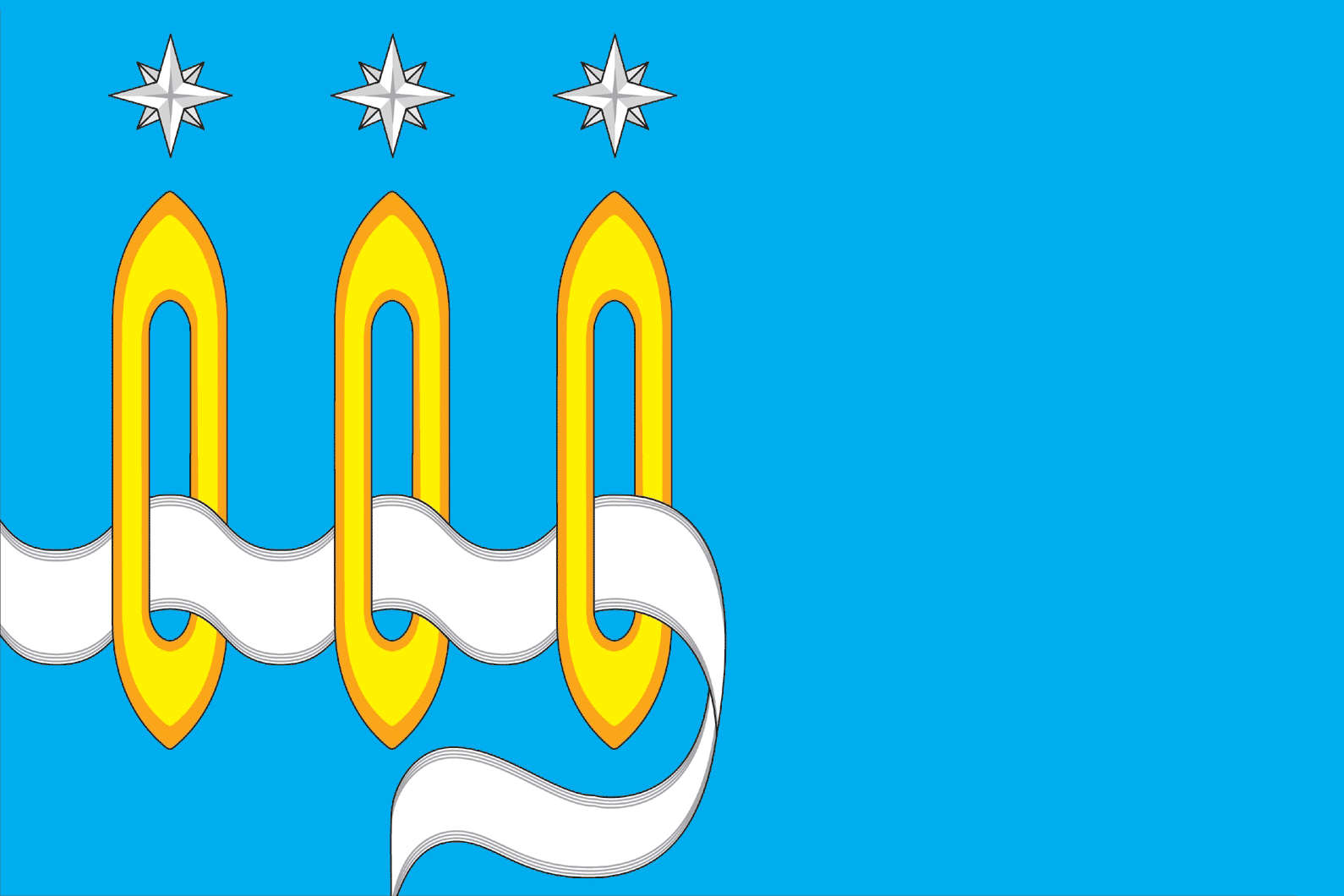
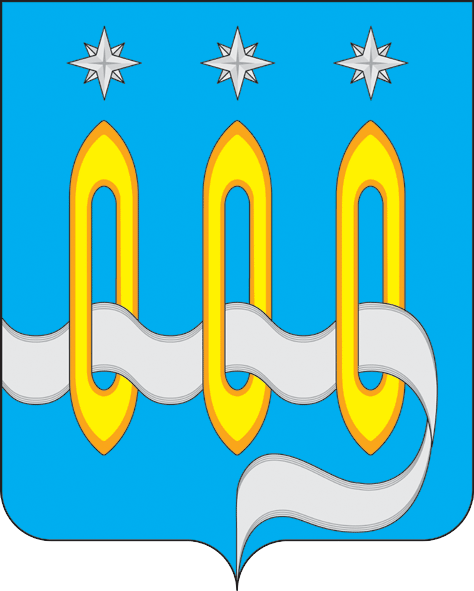
- Flag Coat of arms
- Interactive map of Shchyolkovo
- Location of Shchyolkovo Shchyolkovo (Moscow Oblast)
- Coordinates: 55°55′N 38°00′E
- Country: Russia
- Federal subject: Moscow Oblast
- Administrative district: Shchyolkovsky District
- CitySelsoviet: Shchyolkovo
- Founded: 16th century
- City status since: 1925
- Elevation: 150 m (490 ft)

Population (2010 Census)
  - Total: 110,411
  - Estimate (2025): 139,737 (+26.6%)
  - Rank: 145th in 2010

Administrative status
  - Capital of: Shchyolkovsky District, City of Shchyolkovo

Municipal status
  - Municipal district: Shchyolkovsky Municipal District
  - Urban settlement: Shchyolkovo Urban Settlement
  - Capital of: Shchyolkovsky Municipal District, Shchyolkovo Urban Settlement
- Time zone: UTC+3 (MSK)
- Postal codes: 141100–141104, 141107–141110, 141112, 141113
- Dialing code: +7 49656
- OKTMO ID: 46788000001
- Website: www.schelkovo-gorod.ru

Shchyolkovo (Russian: Щёлково, IPA: [ˈɕːɵlkəvə]) is a city and the administrative center of Shchyolkovsky District in Moscow Oblast, Russia, located on the Klyazma River (Oka's tributary), 20 kilometers (12 mi) northeast of Moscow. Population: 134,211 (2021 census); 110,411 (2010 census); 112,865 (2002 Census); 109,255 (1989 Census); 91,000 (1977).

== History ==
It dates back to the 16th century. In 1920 ‘s to 1930 ‘s Chkalovsky air base was built and now lies with in the town limits.

== Administrative and municipal status ==
Within the framework of administrative divisions, Shchyolkovo serves as the administrative center of Shchyolkovsky District. As an administrative division, it is, together with seven rural localities, incorporated within Shchyolkovsky District as the City of Shchyolkovo. As a municipal division, the City of Shchyolkovo is incorporated within Shchyolkovsky Municipal District as Shchyolkovo Urban Settlement.

== Transportation ==
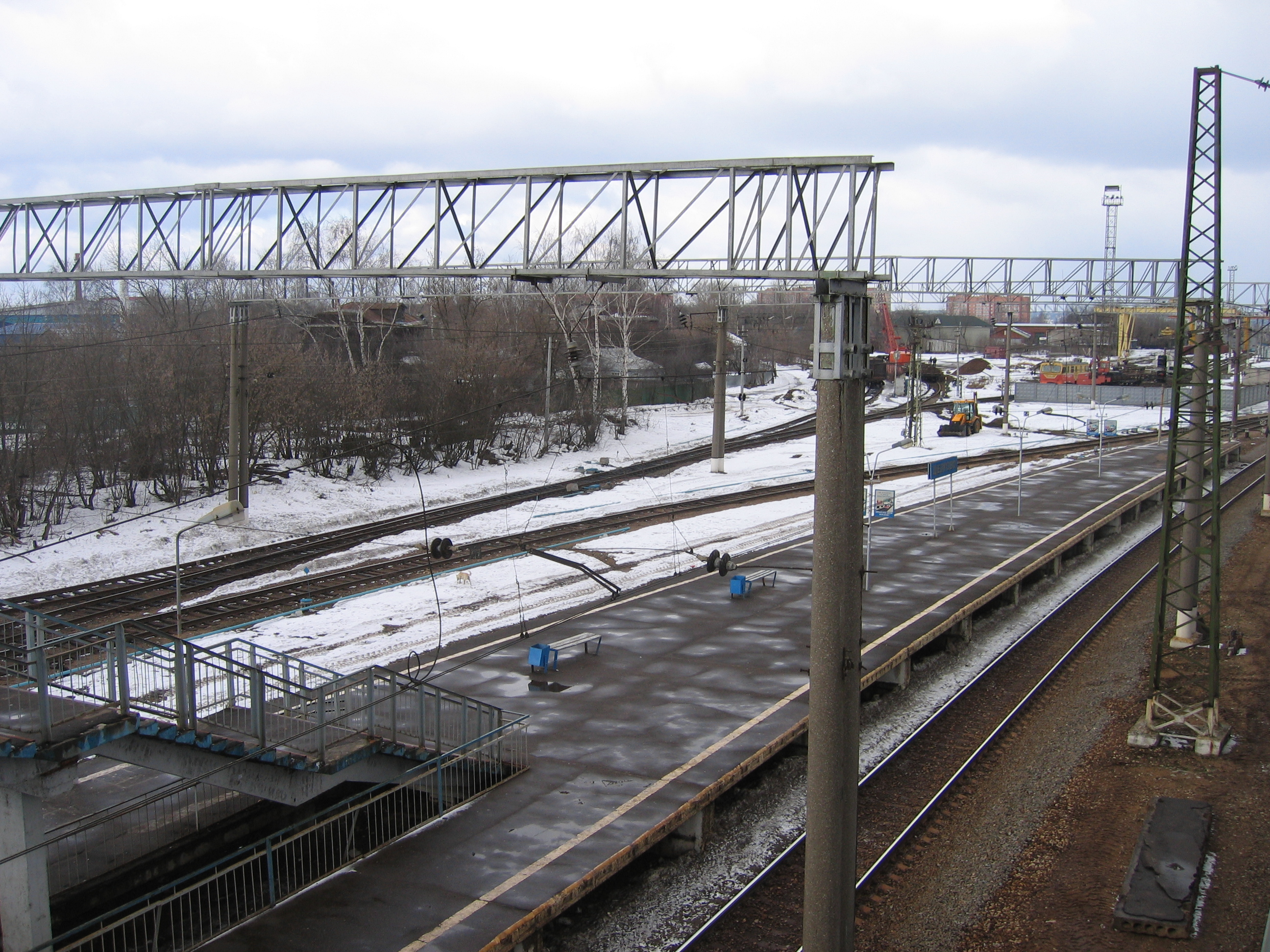
Shchyolkovo, railway station

The city is reachable in about one hour by suburban trains from the Yaroslavsky railway station in Moscow.

In the summer of 2025, new commuter trains Ivolga began operating in Shchyolkovo.

== Culture ==
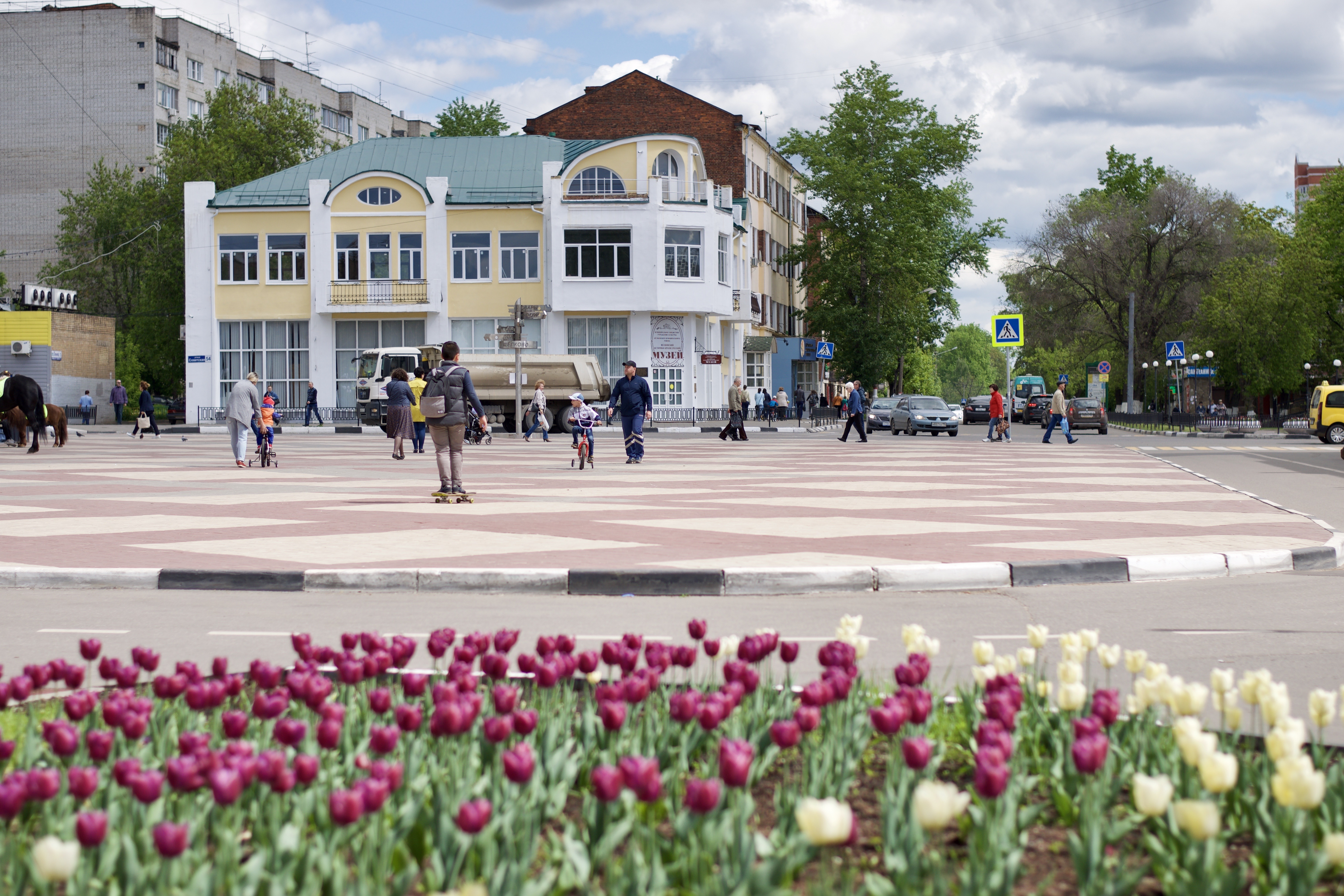
Shchyolkovo Museum of History and Local Lore

The Shchyolkovo District Museum of History and Local Lore was established in 1967 by a decision of the Shchyolkovo City Committee of the CPSU. The museum was originally located in the District Palace of Culture. In 1999, it moved to the city center, occupying the first stone building in Shchyolkovo, constructed in the early 20th century in the Art Nouveau style. The building was originally a shopping center that included the head office of the joint-stock company Shchyolkovo Manufactory A. Sinitsyn and Sons; during the First World War, it served as a hospital for the treatment of wounded soldiers.

== Twin towns – sister cities ==
Shchyolkovo is twinned with:

- Celje, Slovenia
- (Georgia (country)) Gagra, Georgia
- Grodno Region, Belarus
- Hemer, Germany
- Orhei District, Moldova
- Talsi, Latvia
