= Grachyovsky District, Orenburg Oblast =

Grachyovsky District Грачёвский район (Russian)
- District
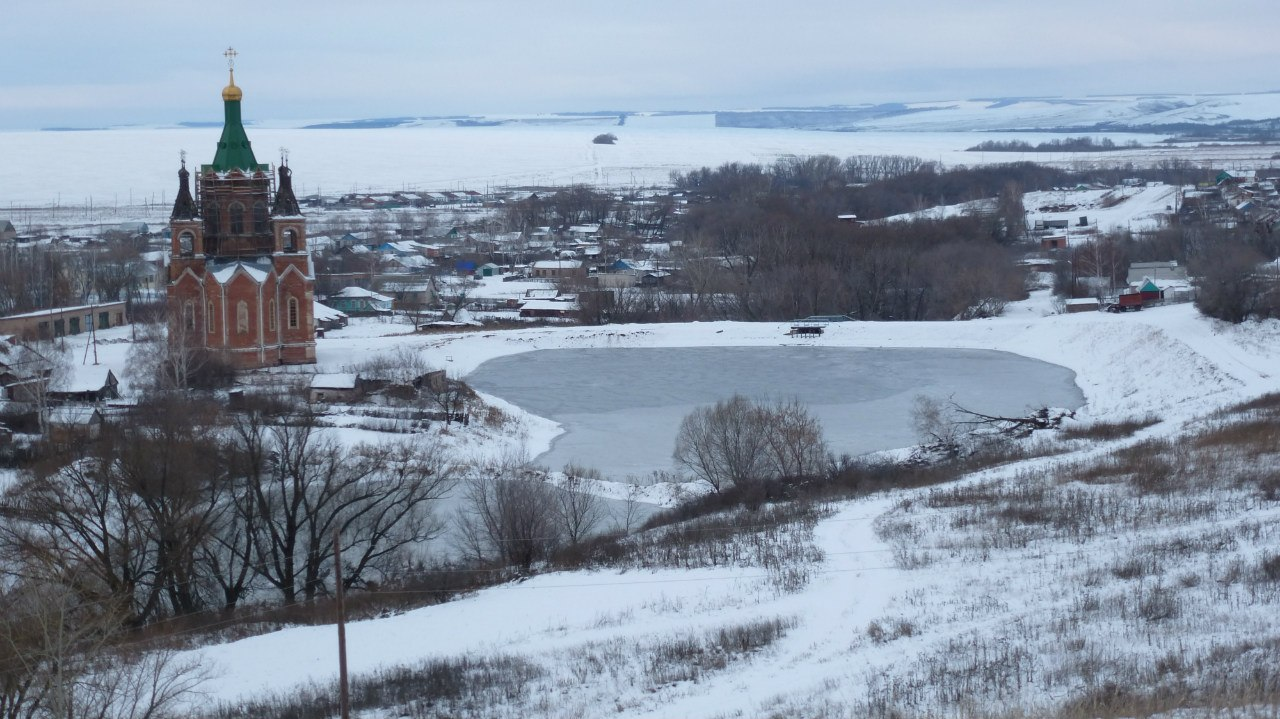
- Church and lake, Grachyovsky District

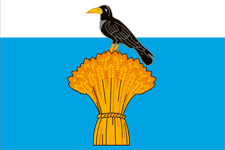
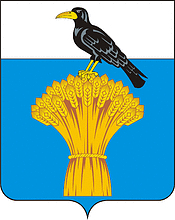
- Flag Coat of arms
- Location of Grachyovsky District in Orenburg Oblast
- Coordinates: 52°55′12″N 52°51′41″E
- Country: Russia
- Federal subject: Orenburg Oblast
- Administrative center: Grachyovka

Area
  - Total: 1,700 km^{2} (660 sq mi)

Population (2010 Census)
  - Total: 13,495
  - Density: 7.9/km^{2} (21/sq mi)
  - Urban: 0%
  - Rural: 100%

Administrative structure
  - Administrative divisions: 13 Selsoviets
  - Inhabited localities: 34 rural localities

Municipal structure
  - Municipally incorporated as: Grachyovsky Municipal District
  - Municipal divisions: 0 urban settlements, 12 rural settlements
- Time zone: UTC+5 (MSK+2)
- OKTMO ID: 53615000
- Website: http://grachevka.org/

Grachyovsky District (Russian: Грачёвский райо́н) is an administrative and municipal district (raion), one of the thirty-five in Orenburg Oblast, Russia. The area of the district is 1,700 square kilometers (660 sq mi). Its administrative center is the rural locality (a settlement) of Grachyovka. Population: 13,495 (2010 Census); 16,198 (2002 census); 15,946 (1989 Soviet census). The population of Grachyovka accounts for 45.4% of the total district's population.
