= Shchyolkovsky District =

Shchyolkovsky District Щёлковский район (Russian)
- District
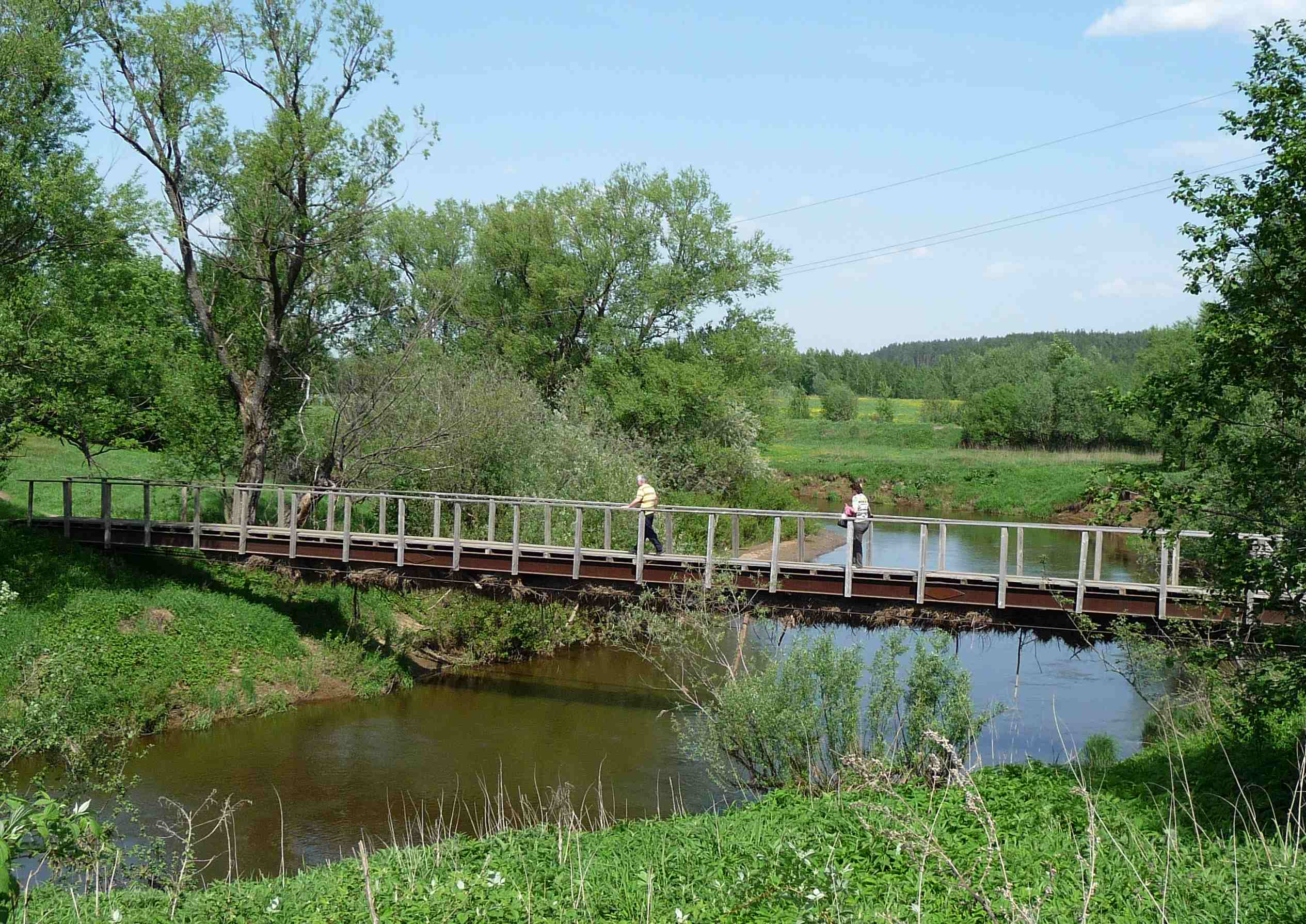
- Village Karmolino, Shchyolkovsky District

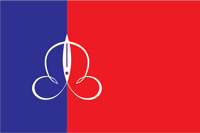
- Flag Coat of arms
- Location of Shchyolkovsky District in Moscow Oblast (before July 2012)
- Coordinates: 55°55′01″N 37°58′52″E
- Country: Russia
- Federal subject: Moscow Oblast
- Administrative center: Shchyolkovo

Area
  - Total: 704.88 km^{2} (272.16 sq mi)

Population (2010 Census)
  - Total: 193,629
  - Density: 274.70/km^{2} (711.46/sq mi)
  - Urban: 82.2%
  - Rural: 17.8%

Administrative structure
  - Administrative divisions: 1 Towns, 4 Work settlements and suburban settlements, 5 Rural settlements
  - Inhabited localities: 1 cities/towns, 4 urban-type settlements, 92 rural localities

Municipal structure
  - Municipally incorporated as: Shchyolkovsky Municipal District
  - Municipal divisions: 5 urban settlements, 5 rural settlements
- Time zone: UTC+3 (MSK)
- OKTMO ID: 46788000
- Website: http://www.shchyolkovo.ru/

Shchyolkovsky District (Russian: Щёлковский райо́н) is an administrative and municipal district (raion), one of the thirty-six in Moscow Oblast, Russia. It is located in the northeast of the oblast. The area of the district is 704.88 square kilometers (272.16 sq mi). Its administrative center is the city of Shchyolkovo. Population: 193,629 (2010 Census); 211,560 (2002 census); 101,216 (1989 Soviet census). The population of Shchyolkovo accounts for 57.0% of the district's total population.
