= Moscow Oblast Duma =

Regional parliament of Moscow Oblast, Russia

Moscow Oblast Duma Московская областная Дума
- 7th legislature

Type
- Type: Unicameral

Leadership
- Chairman: Igor Bryntsalov, United Russia since 15 December 2011

Structure
- Political groups: United Russia (36) CPRF (7); SRZP (3); LDPR (2) New People (1)

Elections
- Last election: 19 September 2021
- Next election: 2026

Meeting place
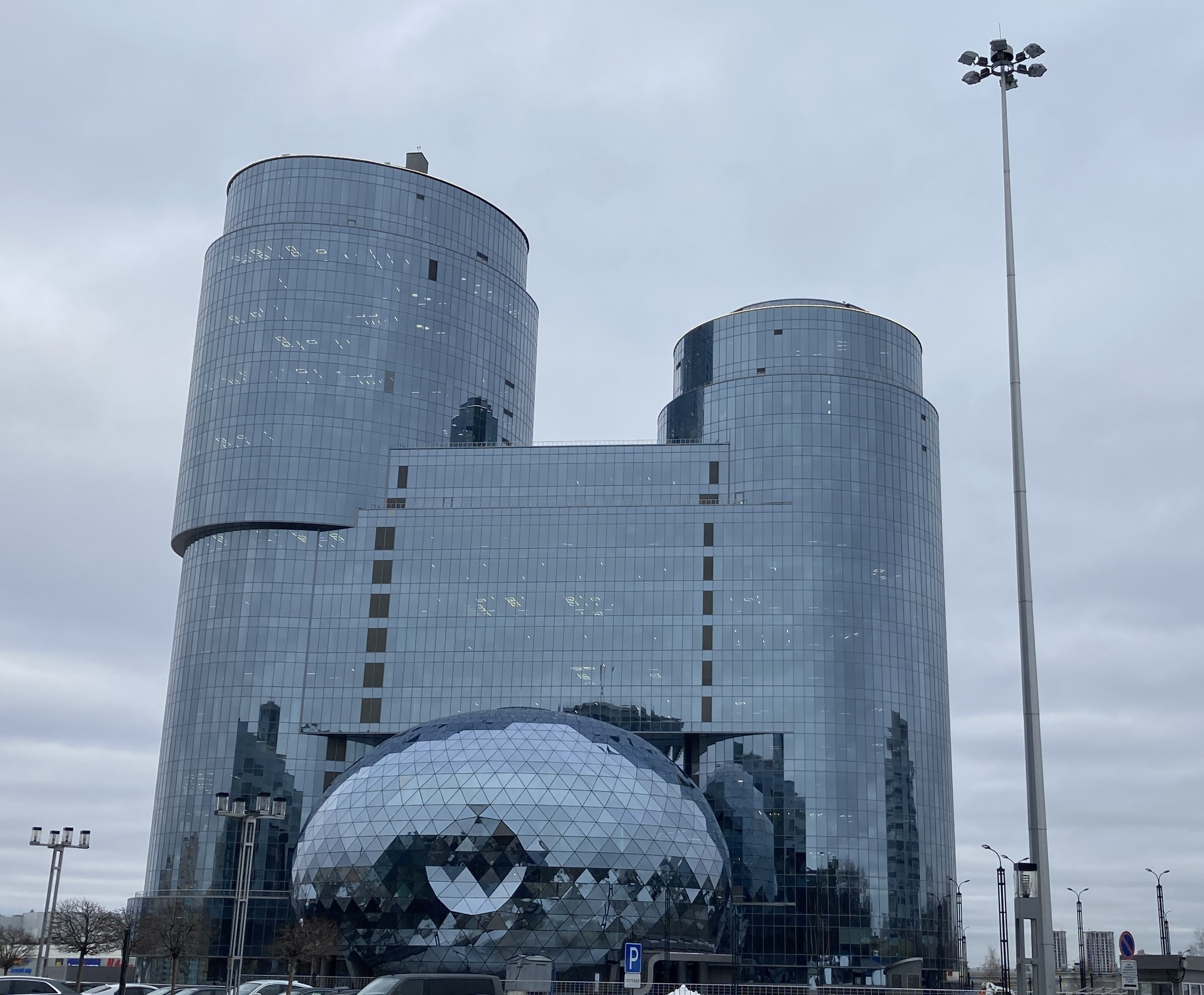
- 7 Stroiteley Boulevard, Krasnogorsk

Website
- http://www.mosoblduma.ru

The Moscow Oblast Duma (Russian: Московская областная Дума) is the regional parliament of Moscow Oblast, a federal subject of Russia.

It consists of 50 deputies that, since 2011, are elected under a mixed-member proportional system, with 25 members elected in party lists and 25 elected by single-member constituencies.

== History ==
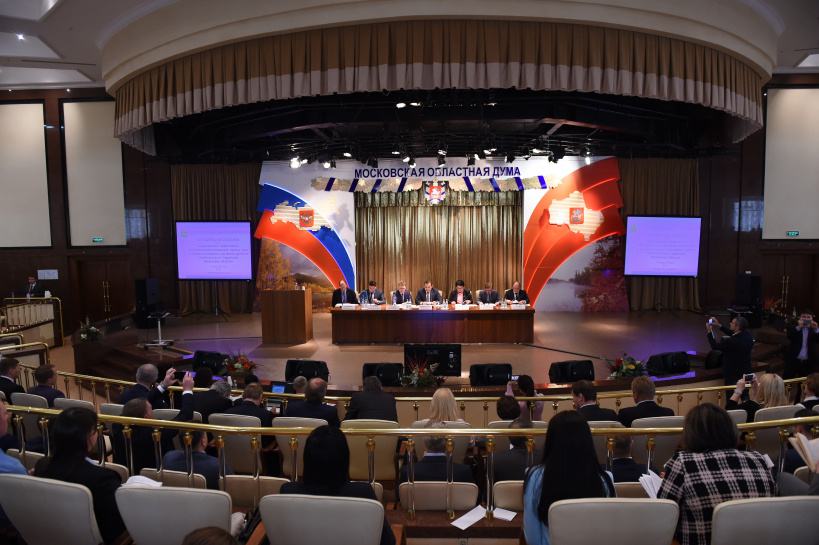
Meeting in the session room

In 1993, the Moscow Oblast Duma replaced the Moscow Oblast Council of People's Deputies, originally established in 1936.

On November 10, 1993, by the decision of the Small Council of the Moscow Oblast Council, the provision "On elections to the Moscow Oblast Duma on December 12, 1993" was approved. On December 12, 1993, together with the adoption of the new draft of the constitution of Russian Federation, according to which the State Duma of the Russian Federation was established and jointly, with the elections to the State Duma, the elections to the Moscow Oblast Duma were held. Alexey Alekseevich Vorontsov was elected as a chairperson.

In 1995, the mandate of the first convocation were extended without any elections. At the end of 1996, the members of duma adopted the Charter of the Moscow Oblast.

On December 14, 1997, the elections to the Moscow Oblast Duma of the 2nd convocation were held. Together with the elections, a referendum was held on transferring of 50% of the members of the Moscow Oblast Duma to a "semi-professional" basis in order to "save the budget funds".

The composition of the Moscow Oblast Duma has been seriously updated: only 12 out of 50 members were re-elected. Alexander Evgenievich Zharov former head of the regional electoral committee was elected as a chairperson. All leading positions in the regional parliament, including the position of the chairman and of his four deputies, have been held by supporters of the head of the regional administration Anatoly Tyazhlov.

On December 16, 2001, the 3rd convocation of the Moscow Oblast Duma was elected, for the 5-year term. Valery Evgenievich Aksakov was elected as a chairperson.

On March 11, 2007, in a single voting day, the elections for the 4th convocation of the regional duma were held (2007-2012). Valery Aksakov became the chairperson for the second time. The parliamentarians formed 2 fractions: United Russia and Party of Growth.

On March 25, 2011, members of the Moscow Oblast Duma took advantage of the amendment of the law and approved a resolution on postponing the elections to the regional parliament for December 2011, combining them with elections to the State Duma of the Russian Federation. At the same time, the mandate term for the members of the Moscow Oblast Duma of the 4th convocation was reduced by three months, by the day of the first seating of the Moscow Oblast Duma of the 5th convocation.

On December the 4th, 2011, in a single voting day, the elections to the regional duma of the 5th convocation (2011–2016) were held.

The elections to the Moscow Oblast Duma of the 6th convocation took place on September 18, 2016. At the elections, voters gave the majority of votes for a single list of candidates of the United Russia party - 43.15%. At the second place is the Moscow regional branch of the Communist Party of the Russian Federation, which gained 15.88%. At the third position is the Moscow regional branch of the Liberal Democratic Party, which gained 14.43% of votes. The Moscow regional branch A Just Russia party won 5.06% of the votes and ranked fourth place.

== Elections ==
=== 2016 ===
Party	%	Seats
United Russia	43.15	38
Communist Party of the Russian Federation	15.88	5
Liberal Democratic Party of Russia	14.43	5
A Just Russia	5.06	2
Russian Party of Pensioners for Social Justice	4.96	0
Yabloko	4.01	0
Registered voters/turnout	37.7	

=== 2021 ===
Party	%	Seats
United Russia	45.15	36
Communist Party of the Russian Federation	19.47	7
Liberal Democratic Party of Russia	7.95	3
A Just Russia — For Truth	7.16	2
New People	5.29	1
Self-nominated	—	1
Russian Party of Pensioners for Social Justice	4.25	0
Communists of Russia	2.15	0
Registered voters/turnout	44.73	
