= Volkswagen Tiguan =

Compact crossover SUV

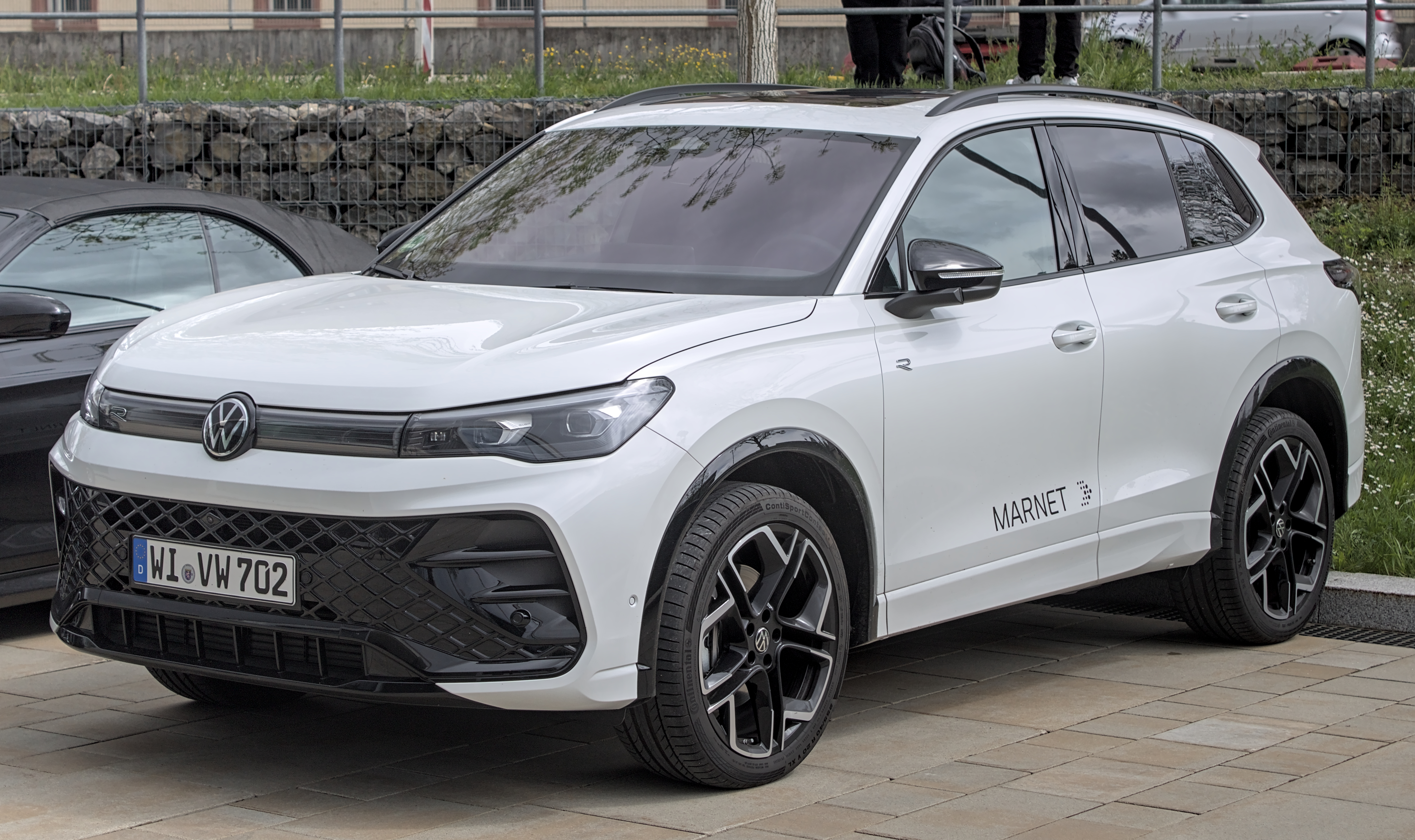

Overview
- Manufacturer: Volkswagen
- Production: 2007–present
- Model years: 2009–present (North America)

Body and chassis
- Class: Compact crossover SUV
- Body style: 5-door SUV
- Layout: Front-engine, front-wheel-drive; Front-engine, all-wheel-drive; (4motion)
- Chassis: Unibody

The Volkswagen Tiguan (German pronunciation: [ˈfɔlksˌvaːɡn̩ ˈtiːɡu̯aːn]) is a sport utility vehicle produced by German manufacturer Volkswagen since 2007, sitting between the smaller T-Roc and the larger Touareg in the company's crossover SUV range. The first generation was based on the PQ46 platform, while the second generation, released in 2016, utilizes the Volkswagen Group MQB A2 platform. It is generally considered to be a medium-sized SUV in Europe, while in North America it is considered to be a compact crossover SUV.

The name Tiguan is a portmanteau of the German words Tiger ("tiger") and Leguan ("iguana") and won a naming contest by German car magazine publisher Auto Bild—from a field of names that also included Namib, Rockton, Samun and Nanuk.

As of the spring of 2020, six million units had been sold worldwide, with 910,926 units being manufactured in 2019 alone, making the Tiguan the best-selling car overall in the Volkswagen Group. It was also the best-selling SUV in Europe.

== First generation (5N; 2007) ==
First generation
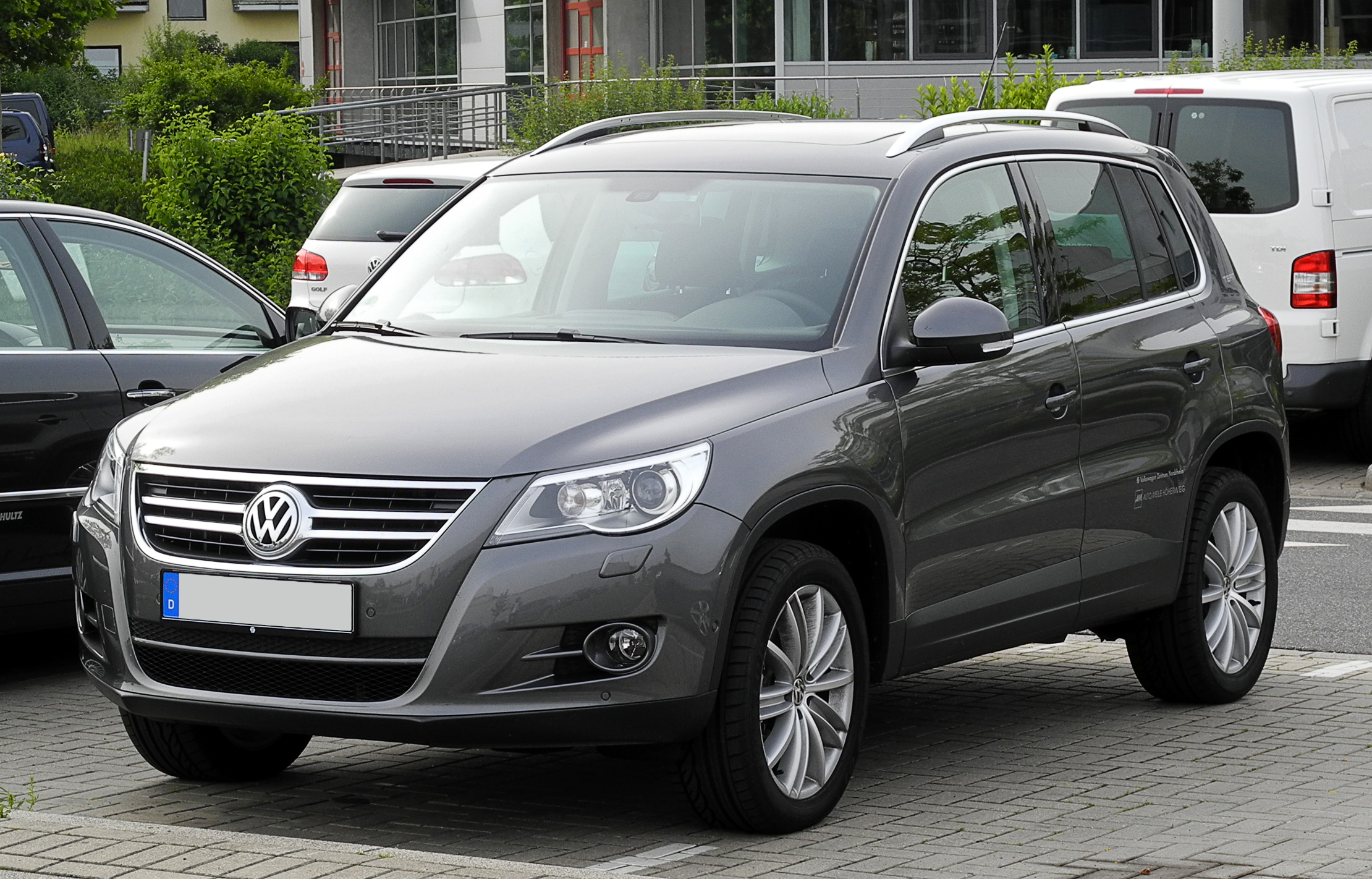

Overview
- Model code: 5N
- Production: 2007–2018; 2009–2020 (China)
- Model years: 2009–2016 (North America); 2017–2018 (North America, Tiguan Limited)
- Assembly: Germany: Wolfsburg (Wolfsburg Volkswagen Plant); Osnabrück (2016–2018); China: Anting (SAIC-VW); Russia: Kaluga (Volkswagen Group Rus)
- Designer: Klaus Bischoff, Marc Lichte and Andreas Mindt (initial design work); Silva Arnaldo Cruzeiro (facelift)

Body and chassis
- Class: Compact crossover SUV (C)
- Body style: 5-door SUV
- Platform: Volkswagen Group A6 (PQ46)
- Related: Volkswagen Passat (B6); Volkswagen Sharan (7N); Škoda Superb (3T); SEAT Alhambra (7N)

Powertrain
- Engine: Petrol: 1.4 L TSI I4; 1.8 L TSI I4; 2.0 L TSI I4; Diesel: 2.0 L TDI I4
- Transmission: 6-speed manual 6-speed automatic 6-speed DSG; 7-speed DSG

Dimensions
- Wheelbase: 2,604–2,684 mm (102.5–105.7 in)
- Length: 4,427–4,432 mm (174.3–174.5 in)
- Width: 1,809 mm (71.2 in)
- Height: 1,666–1,686 mm (65.6–66.4 in)

The first generation Tiguan was initially shown as a concept vehicle at the LA Auto Show in November 2006. The production form of the Tiguan was revealed online in June 2007 following a prototype preview in Namibia, before being officially launched at the Frankfurt International Motor Show in September 2007.

The Tiguan went on sale in Europe in early 2008, and was initially available with two engines, a 2.0-litre 140 PS (138 hp; 103 kW) TDI and a 1.4-litre 150 PS (148 hp; 110 kW) TSI petrol unit. All first generation Tiguans featured two-row seating and transversely mounted four-cylinder engines. Production began in the end of 2007 at Volkswagen's subsidiary Auto 5000 in Wolfsburg and continued subsequently under the company's standard contract arrangements, at Wolfsburg and in Kaluga, Russia.

The first generation Tiguan is based on the PQ46 platform, which is shared with the four corporate siblings, Volkswagen Passat (B6), Volkswagen Sharan (7N), Škoda Superb (3T) and SEAT Alhambra (7N). A common misconception is that the Tiguan is built on the PQ35 chassis that underpins the Mk5 and Mk6 generation Volkswagen Golf. While the PQ46 chassis is based upon the PQ35 platform, there are several differences between the more entry level PQ35 and the mid range PQ46. It shares the same dashboard design with the Golf Plus.

It has a 0.37 drag coefficient.

=== Europe ===
==== Trim levels ====
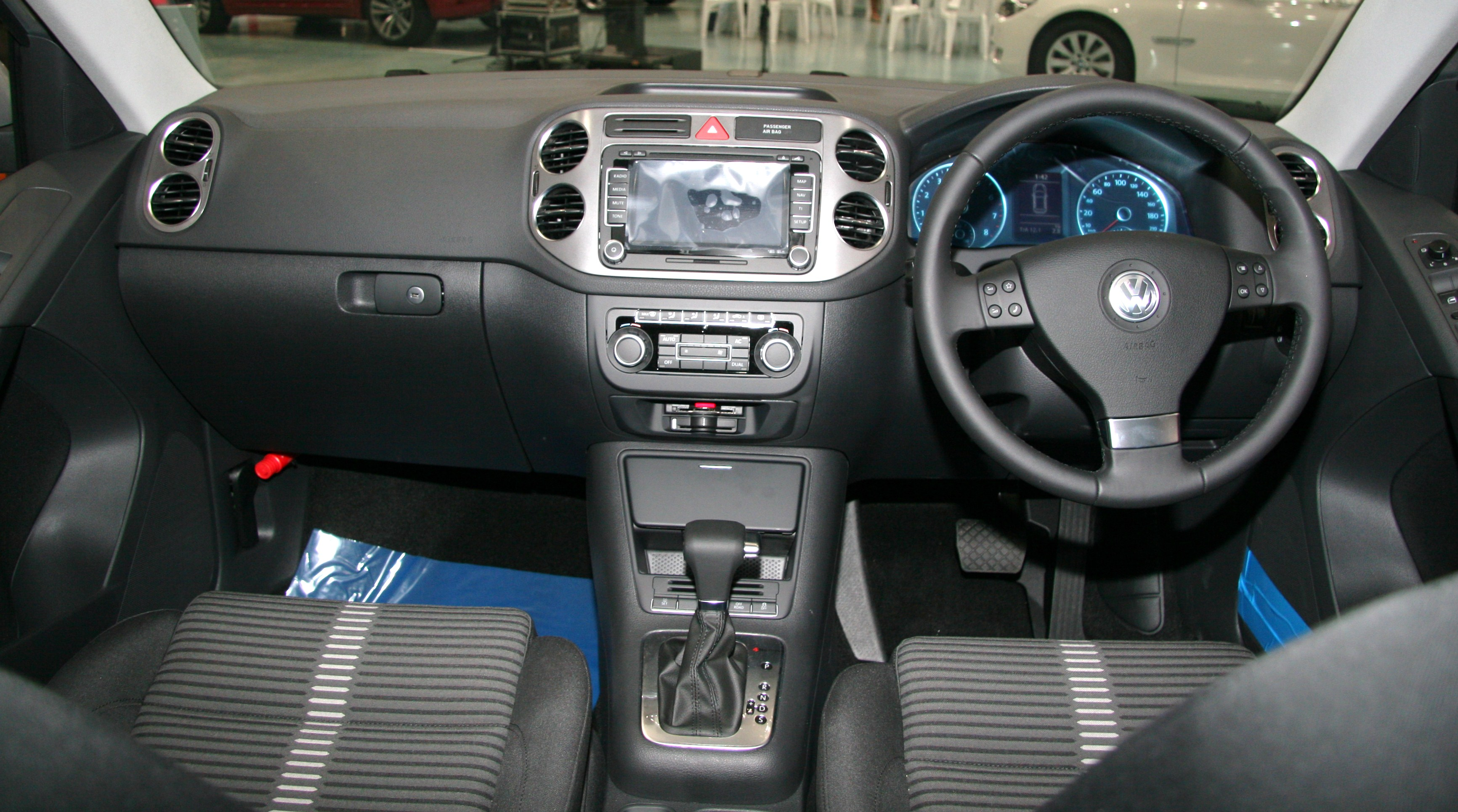
Interior

The Tiguan in Europe was offered worldwide in various trim levels. In the United States, trim levels included S, SE, and SEL. In the United Kingdom, trim levels were S, Match, Sport, and Escape. In Canada, trim levels were Trendline, Comfortline, and Highline with an optional sport package. In Russia and other markets, trim levels included Trend & Fun, Sport & Style, and Track & Field. European markets received an R-Line trim level beginning in 2010.

The Trend & Fun specification offered a maximum approach angle of 18 degrees. Features included six airbags, ESP, Trailer Stability Program integrated with the ESP, ISOFIX child seat anchorages on the rear bench and electronic parking brake with auto hold function, RCD 210 radio with integrated CD player, semi automatic climate control system, four electric window lifts, electrically adjustable and heated outside mirrors, trip computer, RF remote control of central locking and various storage compartments and bins.

Sport & Style offered additional features, including 17-inch alloy wheels, chrome roof rail, chrome strips on front bumper and surrounding side window lining, tinted windows, sport seats with height adjustable lumbar supports centre console with folding and height adjustable armrest, folding front passenger seat, drawers under the front seats, folding table and storage pockets on the backs of the front seats, leather for steering wheel, gear shift knob and gear shift boot, fabric seats with Alcantara accents, cruise control system and tire pressure indicator.

The Track & Field package featured a redesigned front module, with a 28-degree approach angle (instead of 18-degree), hill descent assistant, modified driving pedal characteristic, EDS adaptation (electronic differential locks are activated at the slightest slip), ABS adaptation (which aids with braking on loose substrates), hill ascent assistance, automatic transmission gear level pre-selection (including optimal engine braking effect), 16-inch alloy wheels, tire pressure indicator, black roof rails, engine underbody protection, compass display, special door impact guard strips and seats with adjustable lumbar support.

=== China ===
The import version of Tiguan appeared on the Chinese market in 2009, with a locally built version (aka Shanghai-Volkswagen Tiguan) debuting at 2009 Guangzhou Motor Show. The Chinese built Tiguan is LWB（2684mm）uses 1.8-litre TSI 160 PS (158 hp; 118 kW) and 2.0-litre TSI 200 PS (197 hp; 147 kW), and has a revised front fascia. At the same time, the import Tiguan is still sold in China, which has 2.0 TSI and R-Line kit as highlights.

The basic design of the import model is the same as the international one. Due to the regulations, Shanghai-VW Tiguan is given a Chinese name, known as 途观 (tiguan), and the import one keeps the original letter name to differ locally built and import models.

Since the launch of the second generation Tiguan, the first generation Tiguan continued to be sold in China as the Tiguan Silk Road until it was discontinued in 2020.

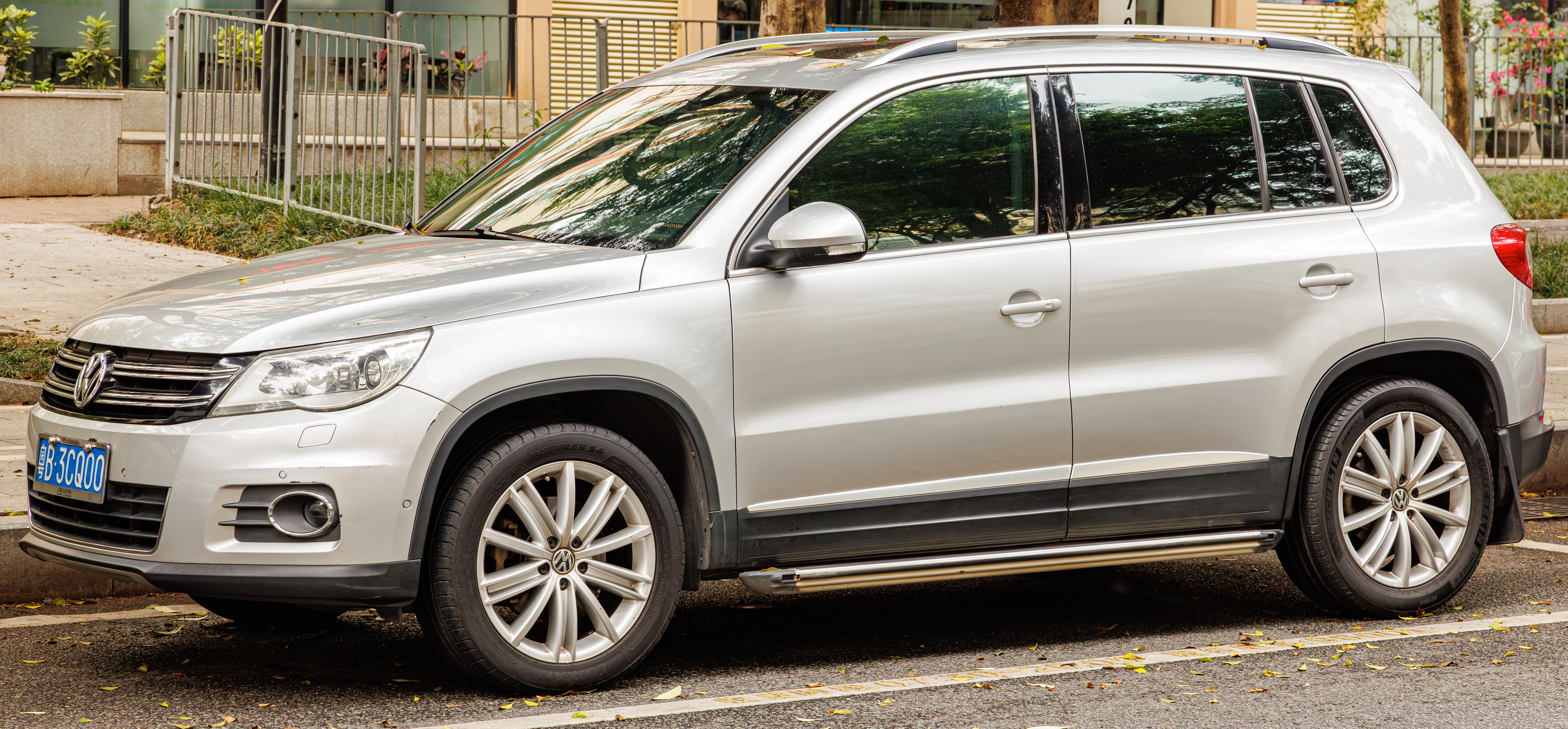
Volkswagen Tiguan (China, pre-facelift)

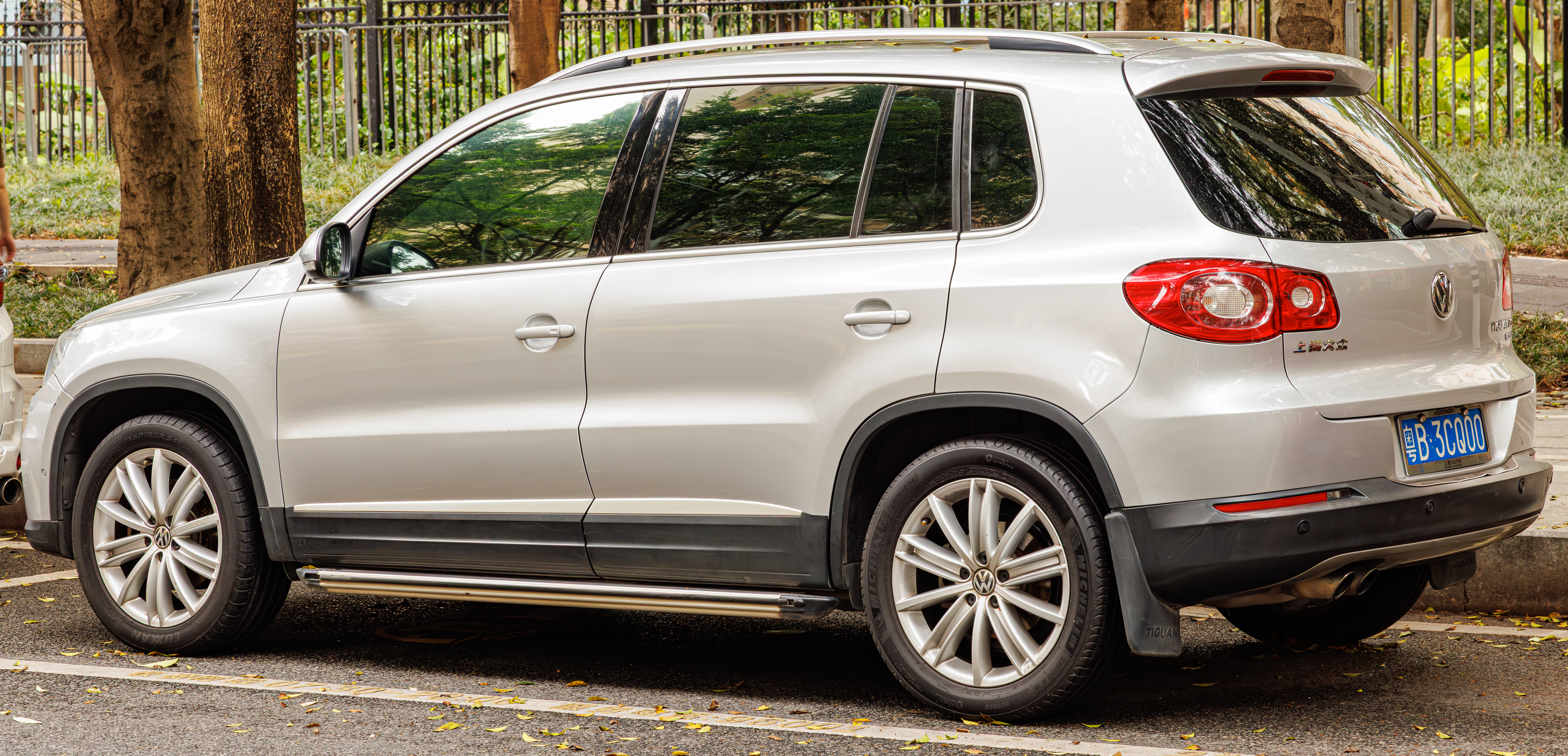
Rear

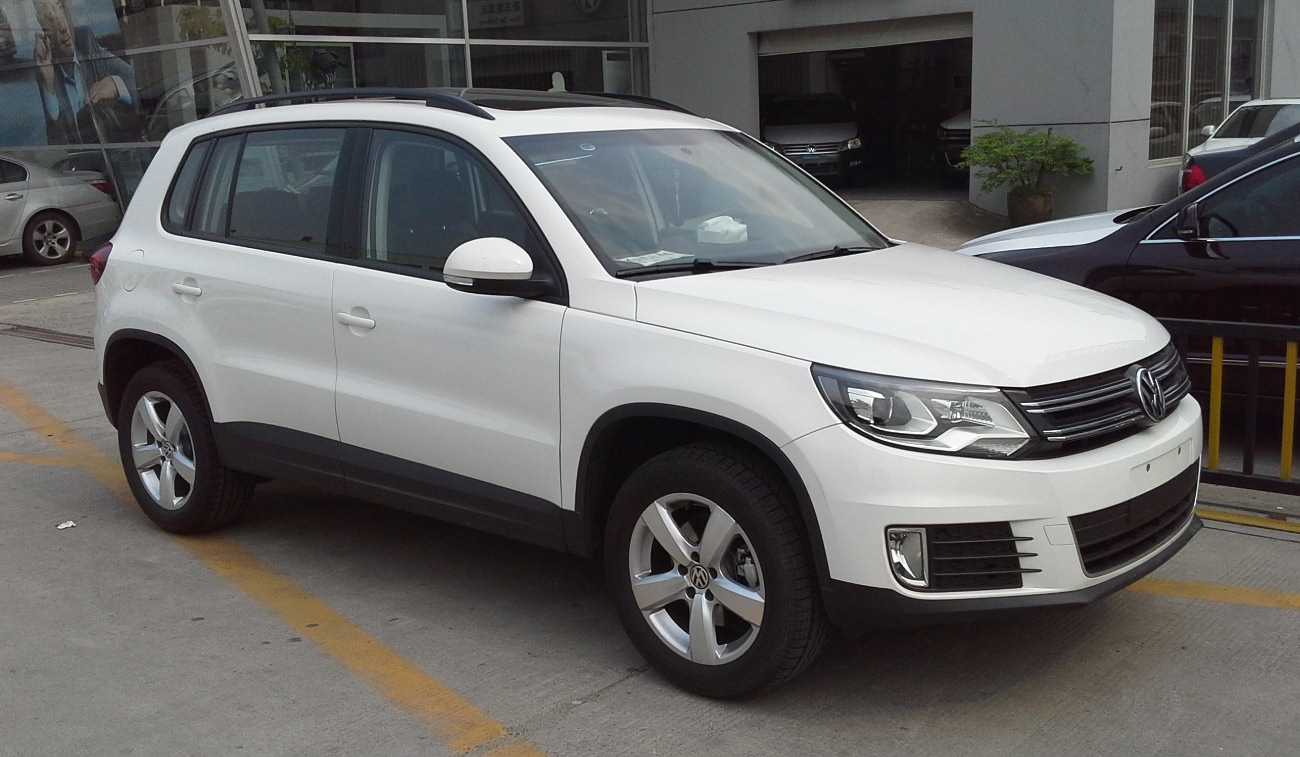
2014 Volkswagen Tiguan (China, facelift)

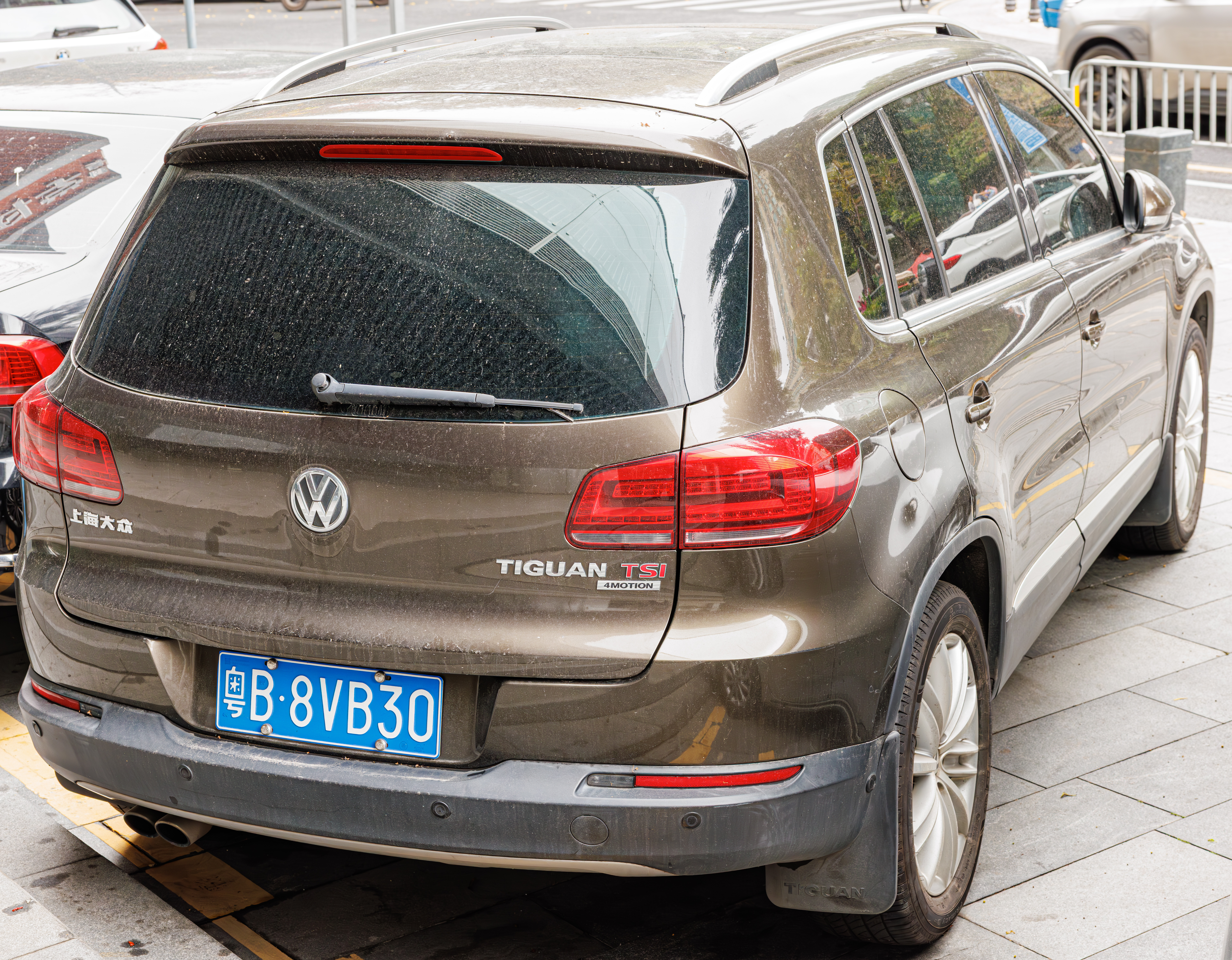
Rear

=== North America ===
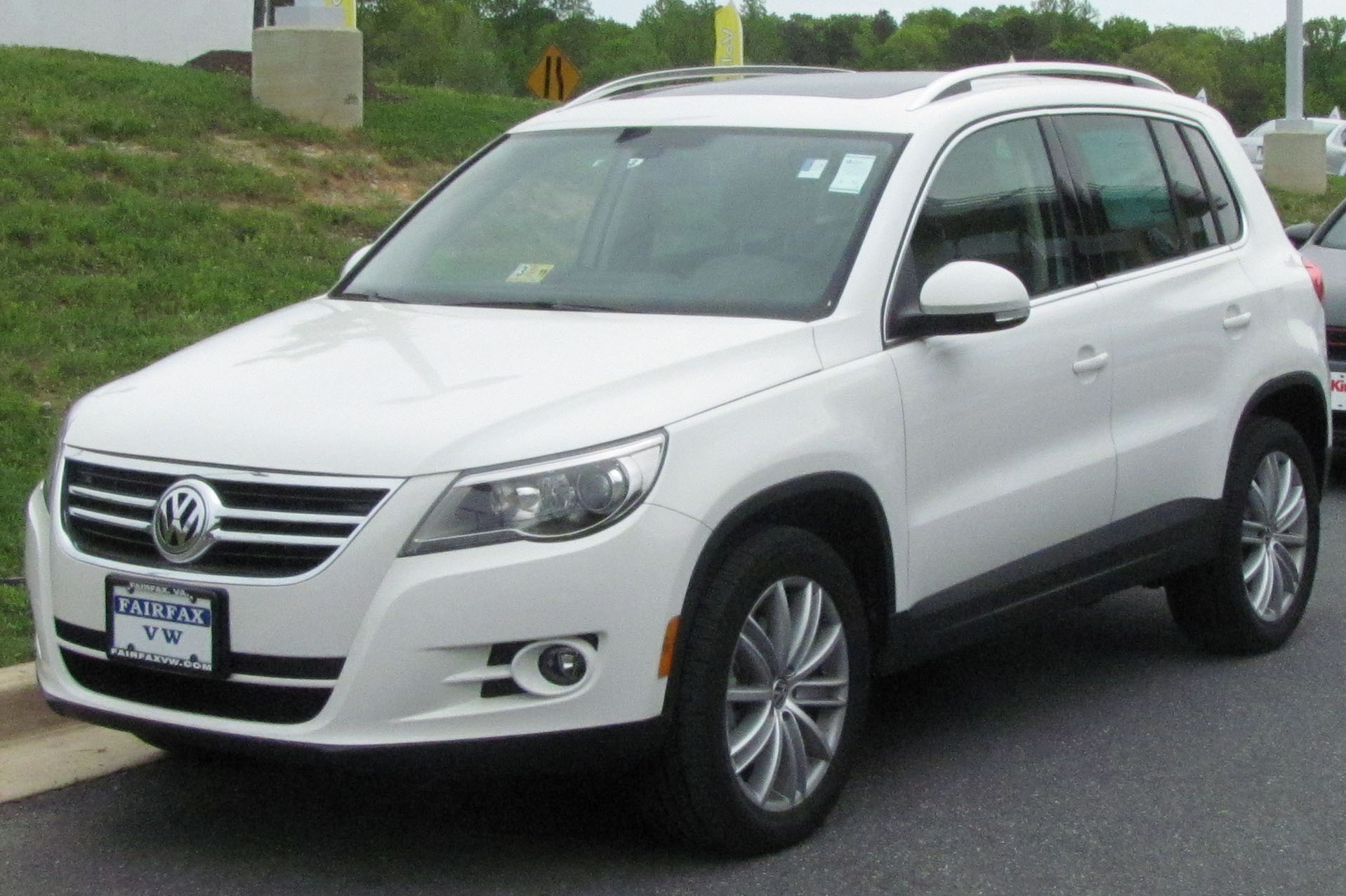
2010 Volkswagen Tiguan (United States)

The Tiguan was launched in United States and Canada in May 2008 for the 2009 model year. It was powered by a direct-injected and turbocharged 200 PS (197 hp; 147 kW) 2.0-litre petrol engine. Imported from Germany, Volkswagen of America had positioned the first generation Tiguan as a niche product due to its high price tag impacted by a crippling dollar-euro exchange, with annual sales of 20,000 to 25,000 units. As the result, sales were proved lackluster compared to its rivals, with only 175,606 Tiguans sold in the United States between 2008 and 2015.

==== Tiguan Limited (2017–2018) ====
In April 2017, Volkswagen of America announced that it would continue to sell its outgoing Tiguan alongside the second generation model, rebranding it as the Volkswagen Tiguan Limited. Due to slow sales compared to the second generation model, the Tiguan Limited was discontinued after the 2018 model year.

=== Safety ===
==== ANCAP ====
ANCAP test results Volkswagen Tiguan variant(s) as tested (2008)
Test	Score
Overall	5 /5 stars
Frontal offset	14.25/16
Side impact	16/16
Pole	2/2
Seat belt reminders	2/3
Whiplash protection	Not Assessed
Pedestrian protection	Marginal
Electronic stability control	Standard

==== Euro NCAP ====
Euro NCAP test results VW Tiguan 2.0 diesel (2009)
Test	Points	%
Overall:	5 /5 stars	
Adult occupant:	31	87%
Child occupant:	39	79%
Pedestrian:	17	48%
Safety assist:	5	71%

==== Insurance Institute for Highway Safety (IIHS) ====
IIHS:
Small overlap front (Driver)	Marginal
Moderate overlap front	Good
Side	Good
Roof strength	Good
Head restraints and seats	Good

==== NHTSA ====
2016 Tiguan AWD NHTSA
Overall:	5/5 stars
Frontal Driver:	5/5 stars
Frontal Passenger:	5/5 stars
Side Driver:	5/5 stars
Side Passenger:	5/5 stars
Side Pole Driver:	5/5 stars
Rollover AWD:	18.5%

=== Facelift (2012) ===
Volkswagen updated the Tiguan with a facelift for 2012 models, which was revealed at the 2011 Geneva Motor Show. The headlights were made bolder and more angular, and the prominent horizontal grille bars of the Golf and new Passat were incorporated, as were the angular line design in the two-part taillight clusters. Performance was also enhanced. The interior trim was revised with an updated three spoke steering wheel and gear selector.

Pre-facelift styling

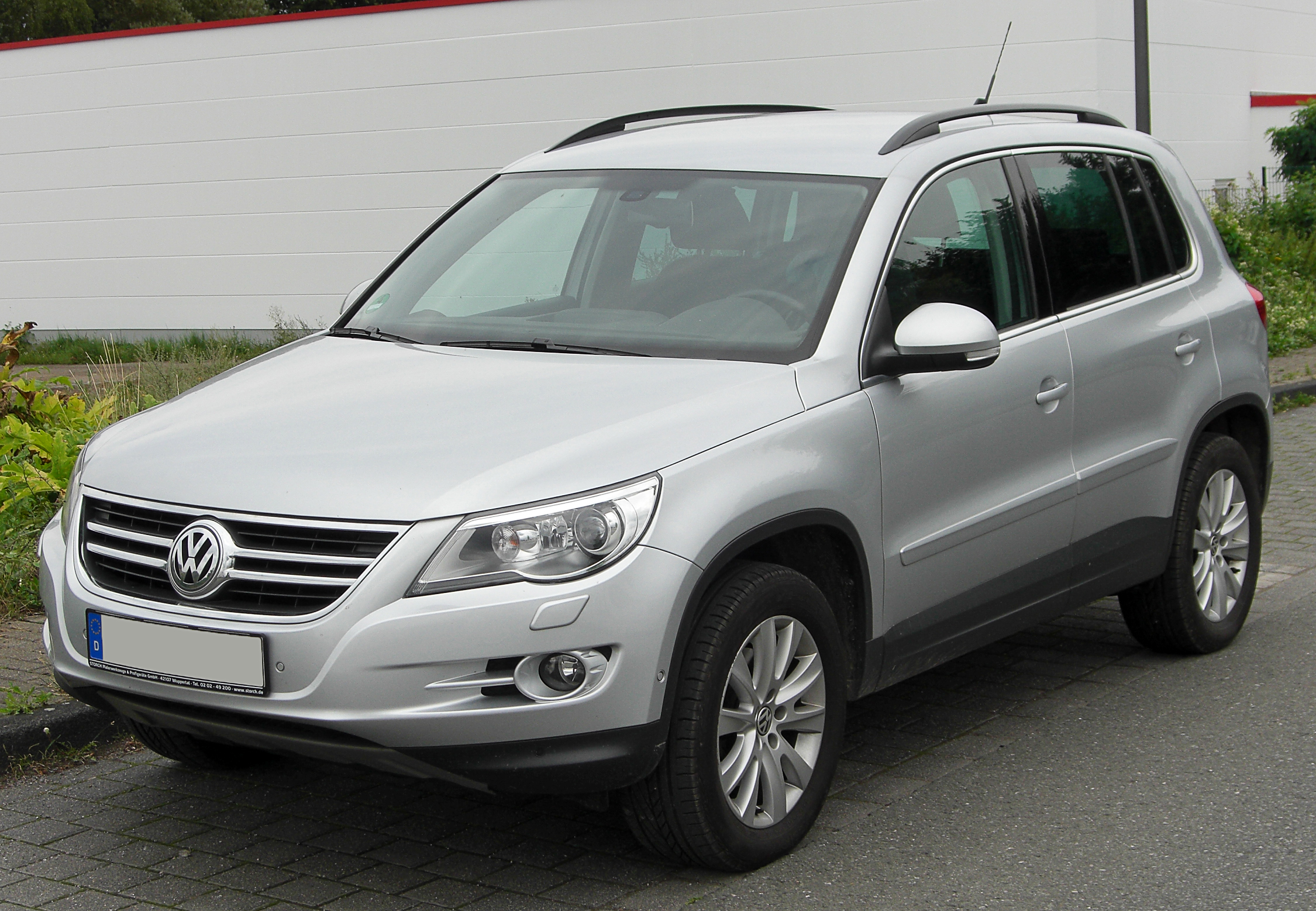
Front (Track & Field)

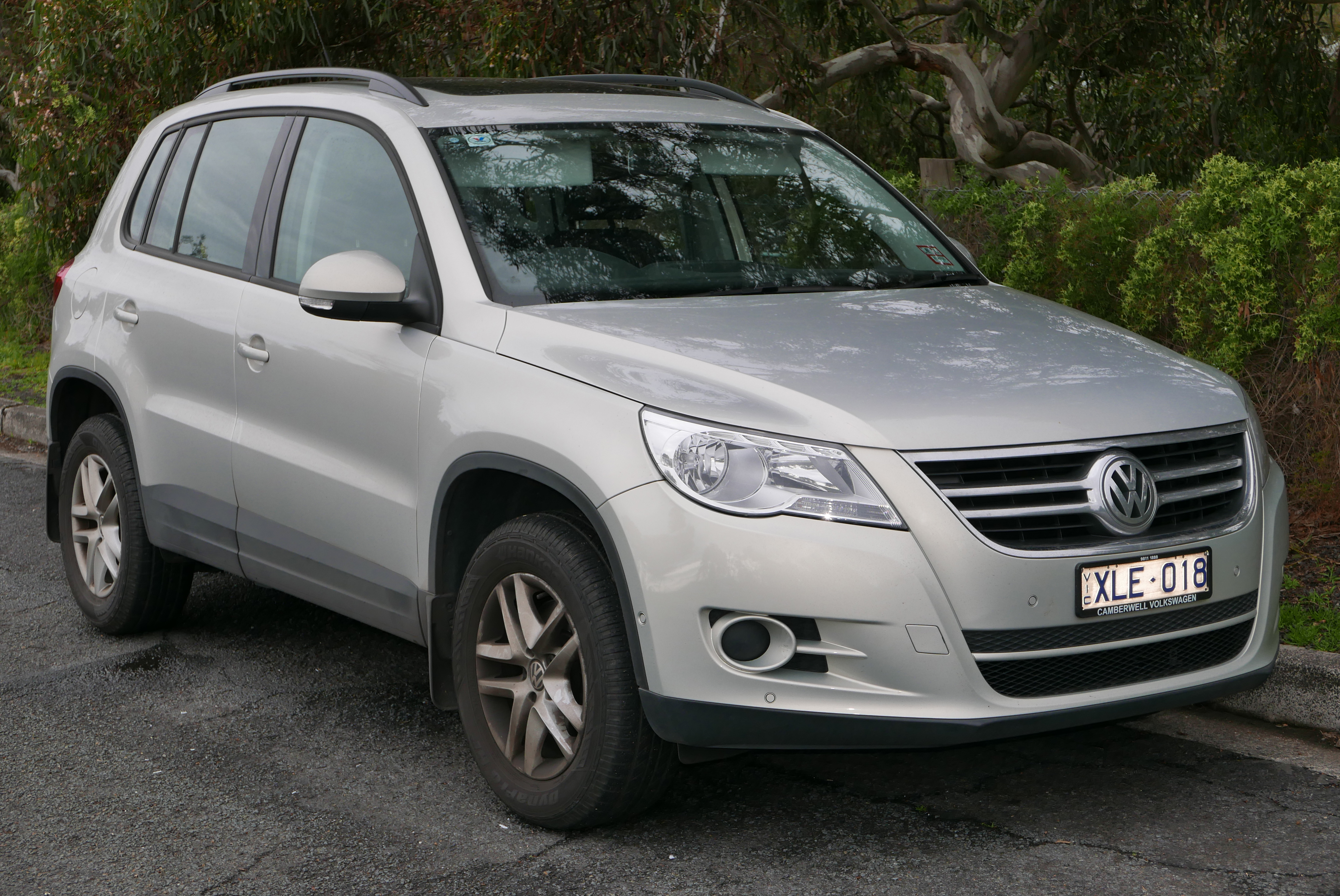
Front

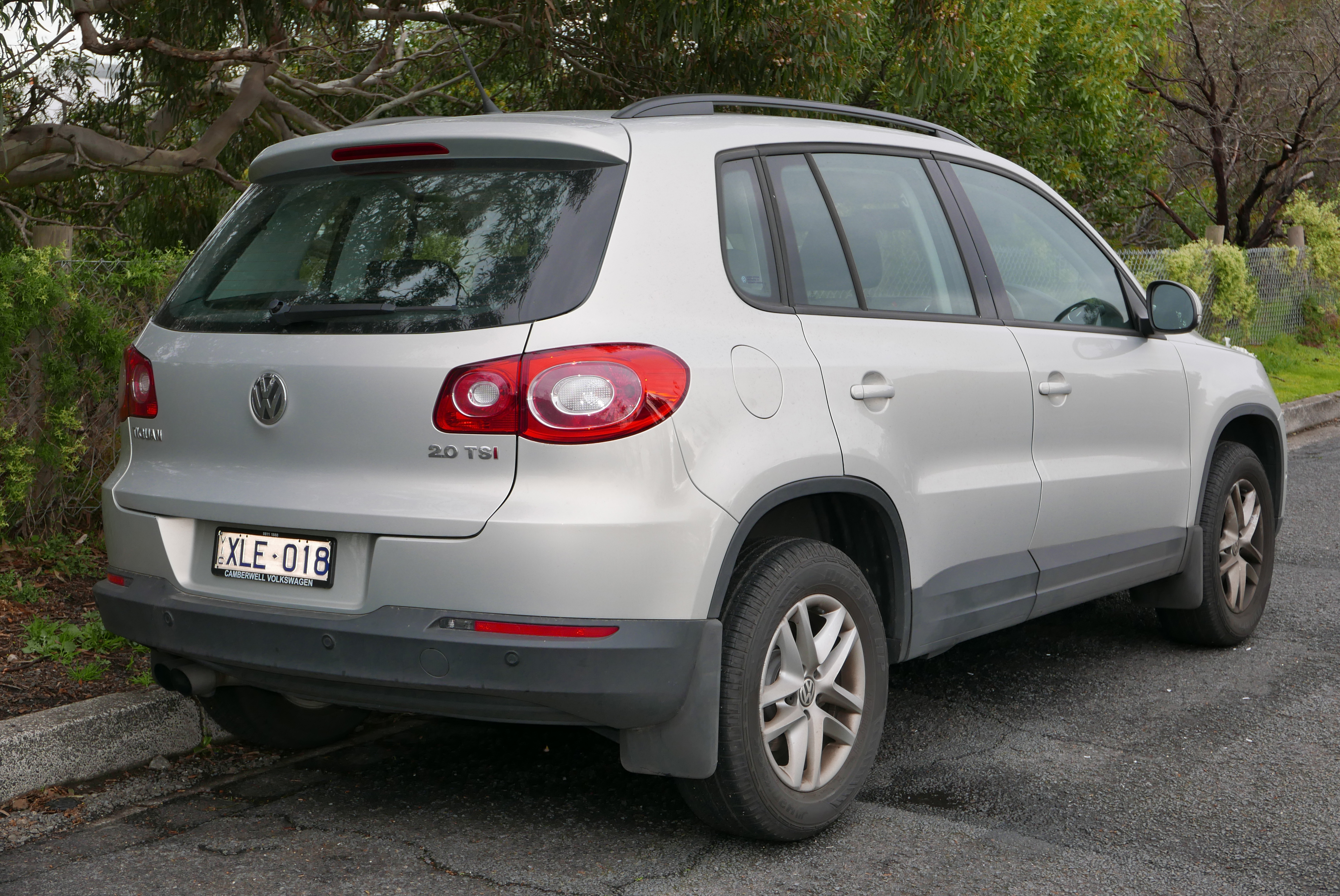
Rear

Post-facelift styling

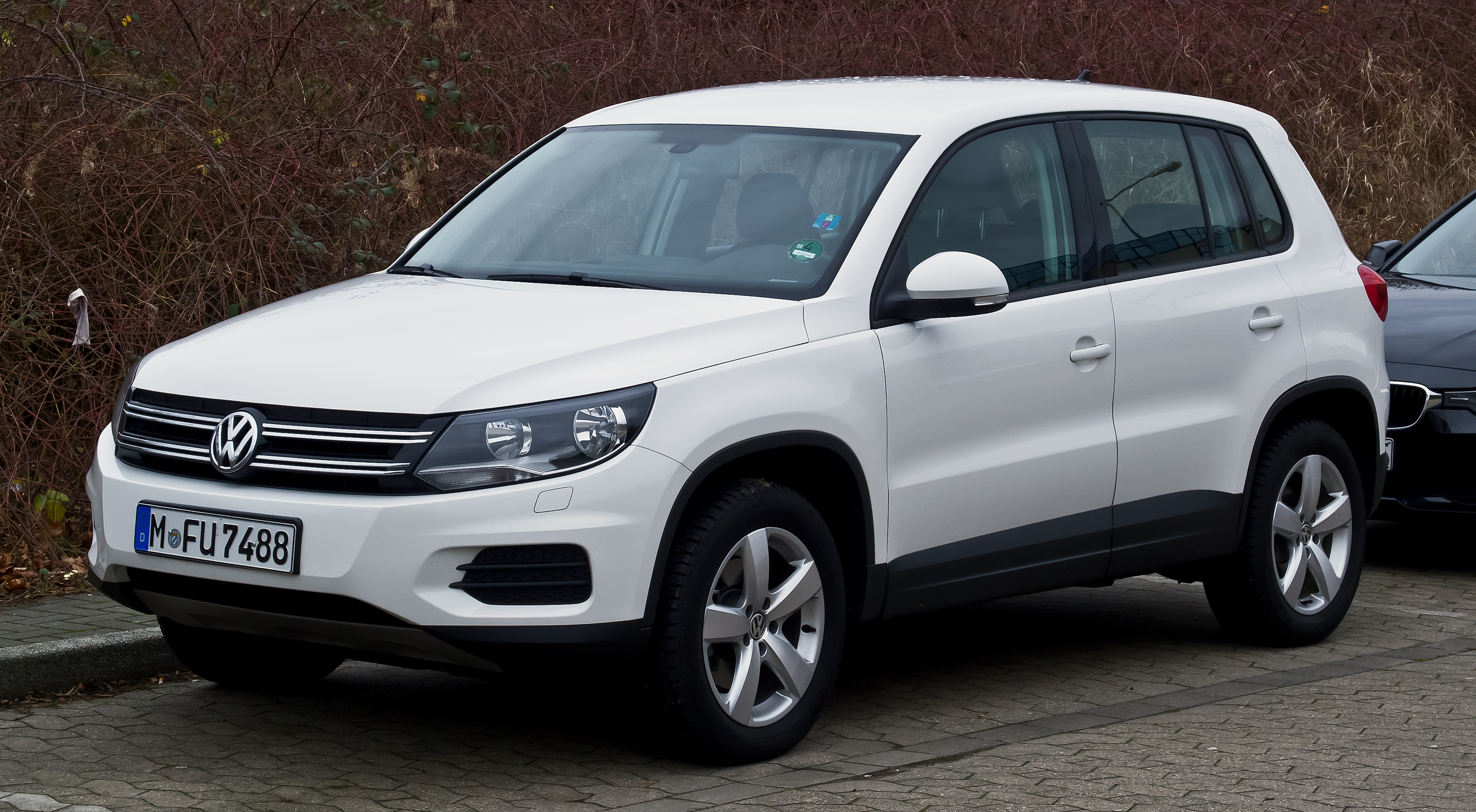
Front (Track & Field/USA)

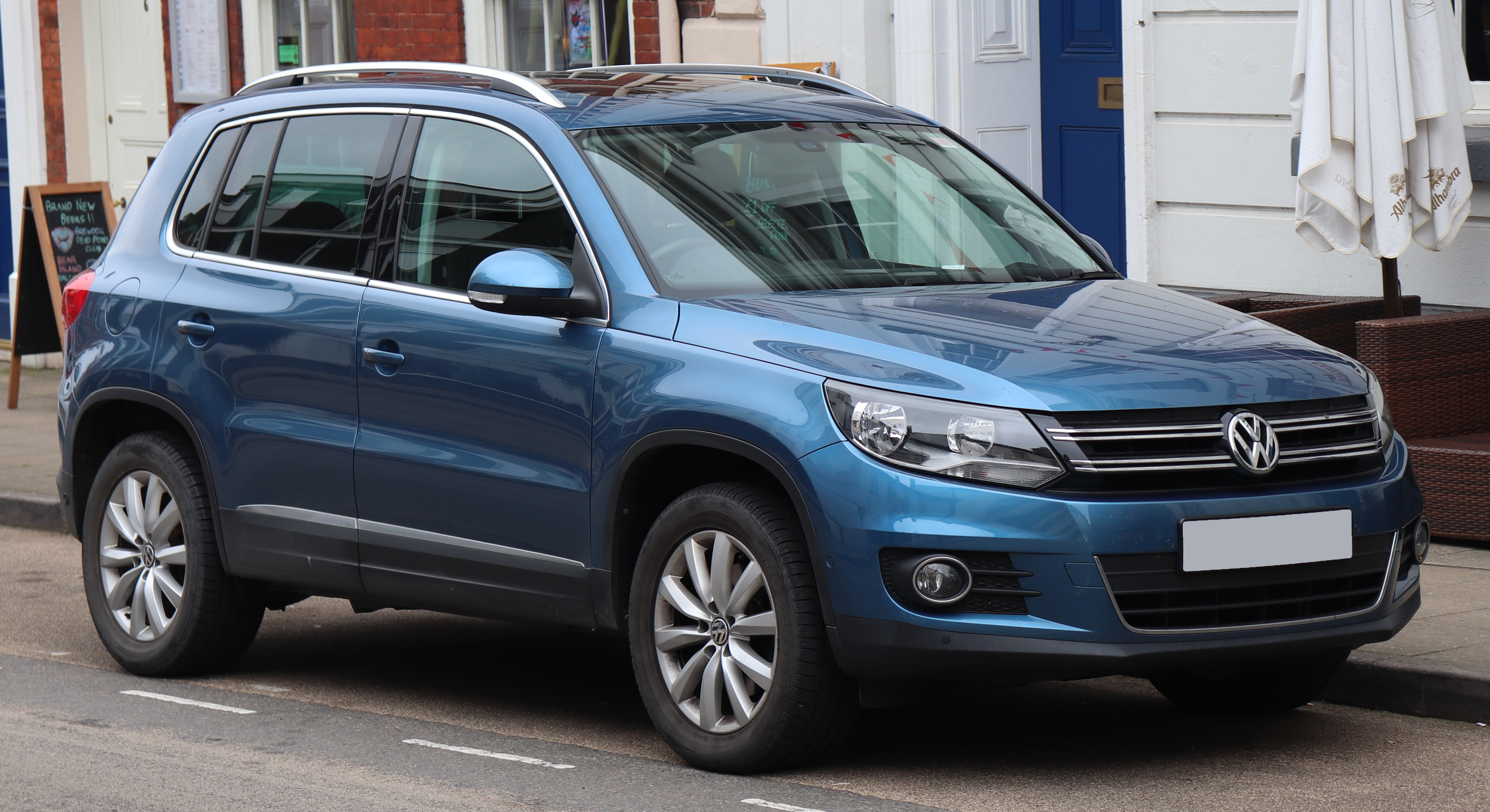
Front

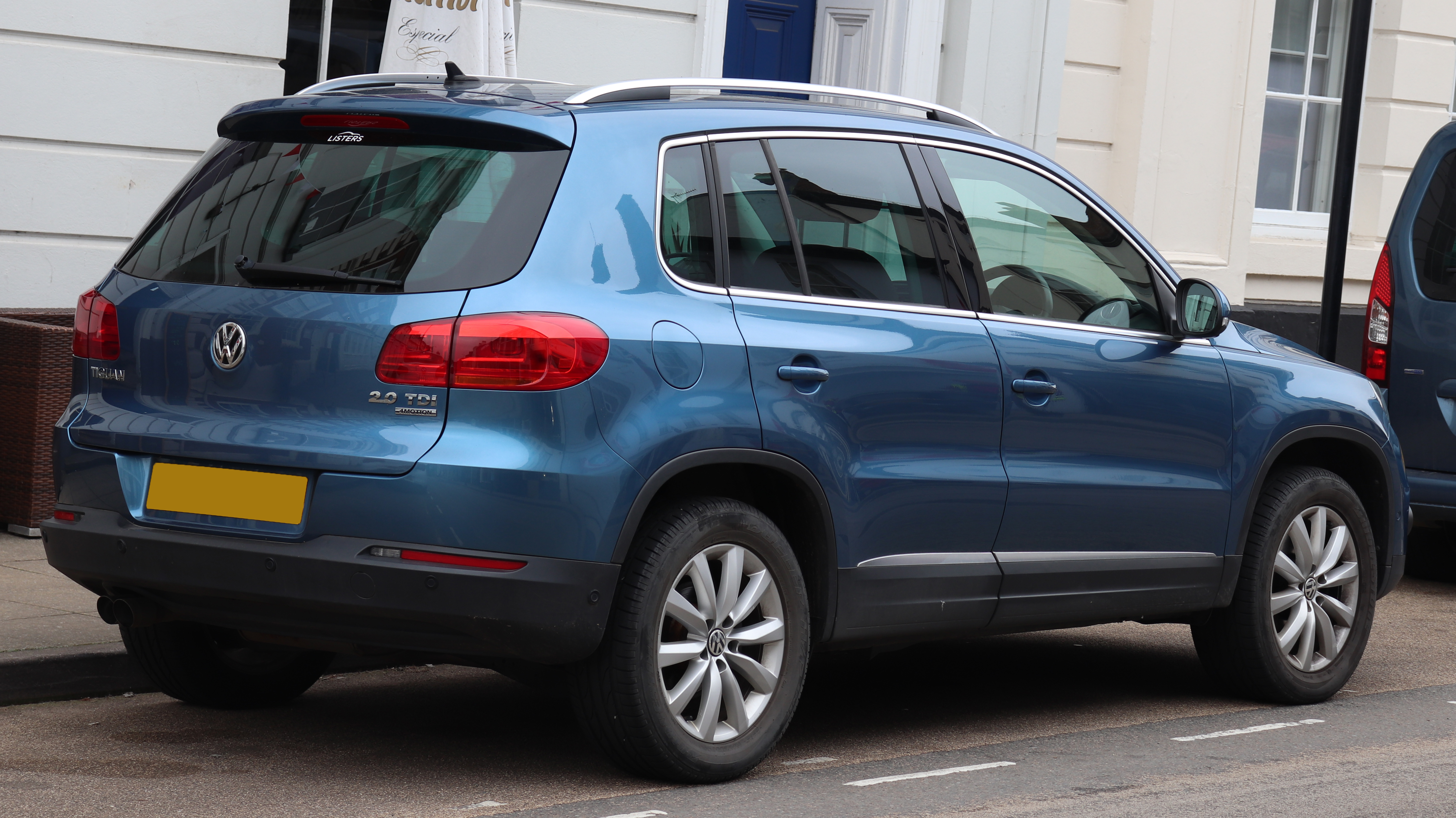
Rear

=== HyMotion ===
At the November 2007 Michelin Challenge Bibendum, in Shanghai, China, Volkswagen showed the Tiguan HyMotion study powered by a hydrogen fuel cell.

The fuel cell produces 80 kW (107 hp) which, when combined with energy stored in the battery, allows the electric motor to output a total of 100 kW (134 hp). These figures allow the Tiguan HyMotion to reach a top speed of 150 km/h (93 mph) and accelerate from 0 to 100 km/h (0 to 62 mph) in about 14 seconds.

The 6.8 ampere hour lithium-ion battery can be charged by the fuel cell or by recovered braking energy. Power output from the lithium-ion battery is 22 kW (30 hp).

== Second generation (AD/BW; 2016) ==
Second generation
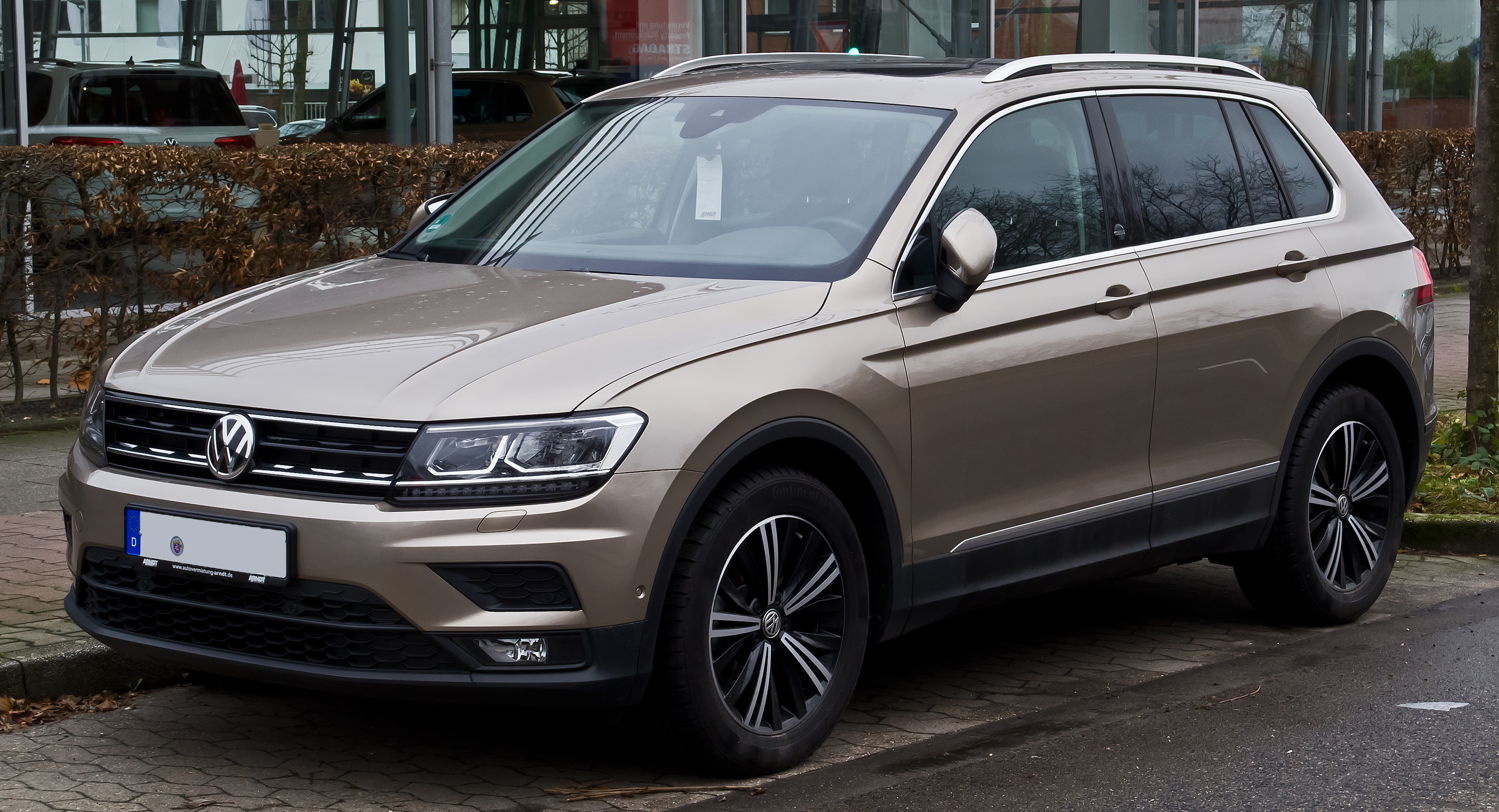

Overview
- Model code: AD1/AX1; BW2/BJ2 (Allspace)
- Production: 2016–2024; 2017–present (China); 2020–2026 (Tiguan X)
- Model years: 2018–2024 (North America)
- Assembly: Germany: Wolfsburg (Wolfsburg Volkswagen Plant); Mexico: Puebla (VW Mexico); China: Anting (SAIC-VW, for Tiguan L and X); Russia: Kaluga (Volkswagen Group Rus); Algeria: Relizane; Kenya: Thika (Kenya Vehicle Manufacturers (KVM)); India: Aurangabad (Škoda VW India); Malaysia: Pekan (HICOM); Indonesia: Purwakarta (National Assemblers)

Body and chassis
- Class: Compact crossover SUV (C) (SWB); Mid-size crossover SUV (D) (LWB/Tiguan X)
- Body style: 5-door SUV; 5-door coupé SUV (Tiguan X)
- Platform: Volkswagen Group MQB A2
- Related: Volkswagen Tayron; Volkswagen Passat (B8); SEAT Tarraco; Škoda Kodiaq Mk1; Audi Q3 Mk2

Powertrain
- Engine: Petrol: 1.4 L TSI I4; 1.5 L TSI I4; 2.0 L TSI I4; Petrol PHEV: 1.4 L TSI I4 eHybrid; Diesel: 1.6 L TDI I4; 2.0 L TDI I4
- Electric motor: 55–85 kW (75–116 PS; 74–114 hp) permanent magnet AC synchronous motor
- Transmission: 6-speed manual; 6-speed DSG; 7-speed DSG; 8-speed automatic
- Hybrid drivetrain: Plug-in hybrid (eHybrid)
- Battery: 13 kWh lithium-ion

Dimensions
- Wheelbase: 2,681 mm (105.6 in) (SWB); 2,791 mm (109.9 in) (LWB/Tiguan X)
- Length: 4,486–4,509 mm (176.6–177.5 in) (SWB); 4,712–4,720 mm (185.5–185.8 in) (LWB); 4,764 mm (187.6 in) (Tiguan X)
- Width: 1,839–1,859 mm (72.4–73.2 in)
- Height: 1,673 mm (65.9 in); 1,628 mm (64.1 in) (Tiguan X)

Chronology
- Successor: Volkswagen Tayron Mk2 (for Tiguan Allspace)

The second generation Tiguan was unveiled at the Frankfurt International Motor Show in September 2015 for the 2016 model year, now built on the Volkswagen Group MQB A2 platform. It was initially revealed in its short-wheelbase model, which is 50 kg (110 lb) lighter than the outgoing Tiguan, while also 60 mm (2.4 in) longer, 30 mm (1.2 in) wider, and its wheelbase is extended by 77 mm (3.0 in). As a result, VW claimed interior space has been improved, with rear passengers having 29 mm (1.1 in) more knee room. Furthermore, the rear bench seat is asymmetrically split and can be adjusted up to 180 mm (7.1 in) longitudinally.

The Tiguan Mk2 is available in two wheelbase variants: a short-wheelbase (SWB) version (referred to as "normal wheelbase" (NWB) by Volkswagen) seating up to five passengers; and a long-wheelbase (LWB) version with standard (or optional in some market) third-row seats, seating up to seven passengers. The latter was revealed in March 2017, offering 109 mm (4.3 in) longer wheelbase and the 215 mm (8.5 in) longer body. In some markets where the Tiguan is sold in both SWB and LWB variants, the LWB Tiguan is sold as the Tiguan Allspace or Tiguan L (in China). The LWB version is manufactured in Mexico to supply worldwide markets (except China), with some countries importing them as knock-down kits. The LWB Tiguan will be succeeded by the Tayron Mk2, except in China where the Mk3 Tiguan is offered in a sole LWB version called the Tiguan L Pro.

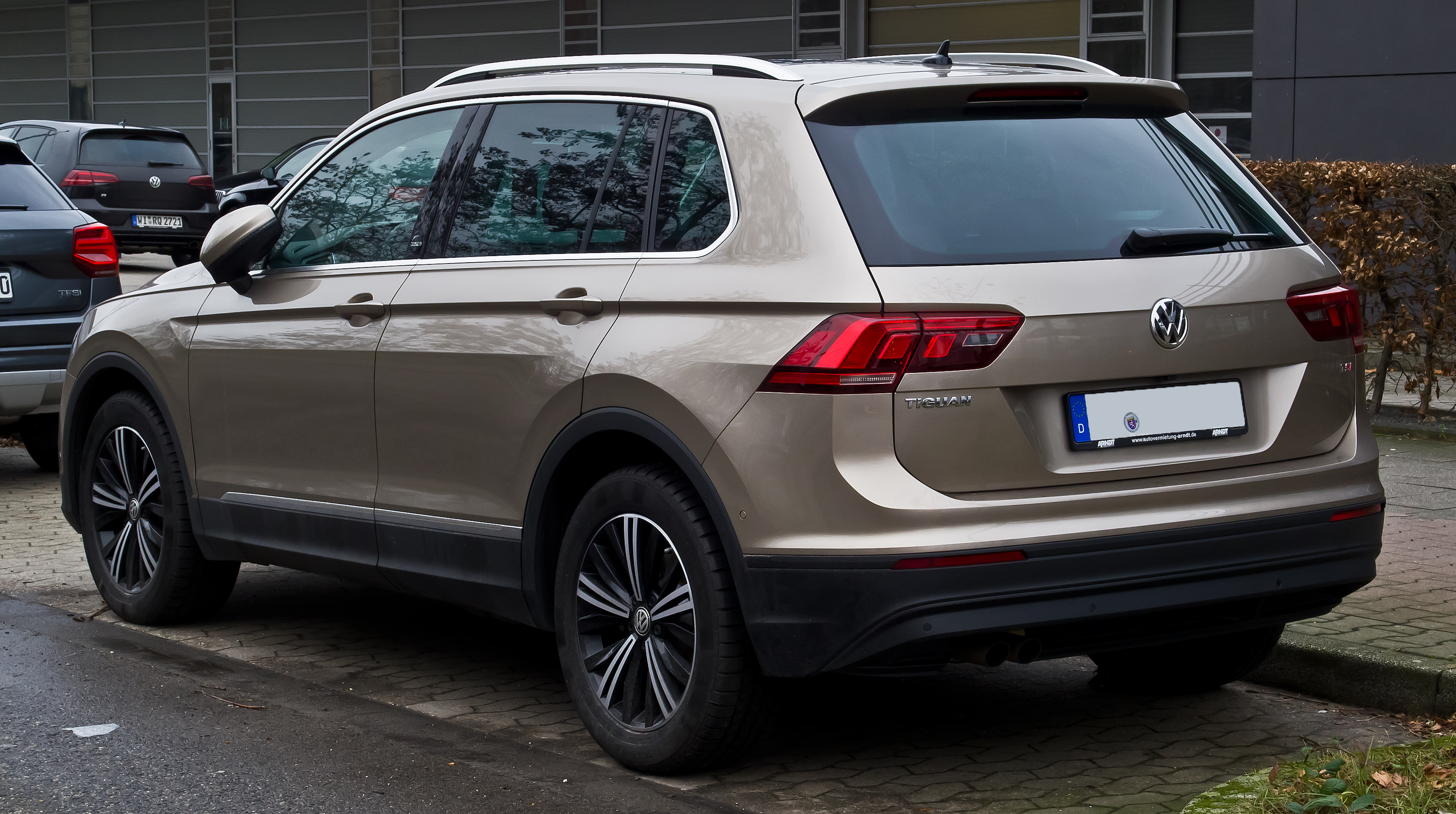
Volkswagen Tiguan

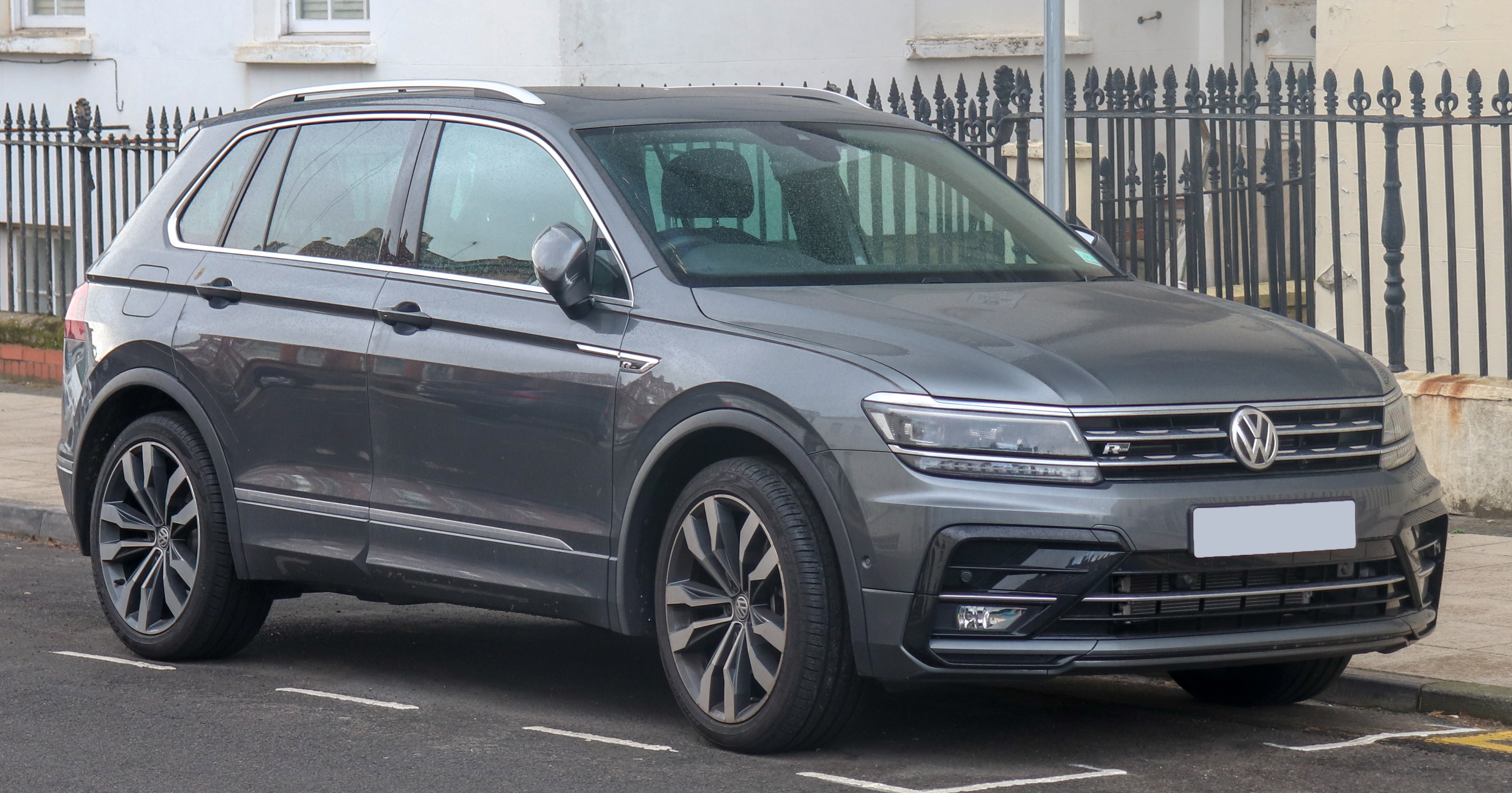
Volkswagen Tiguan R-Line

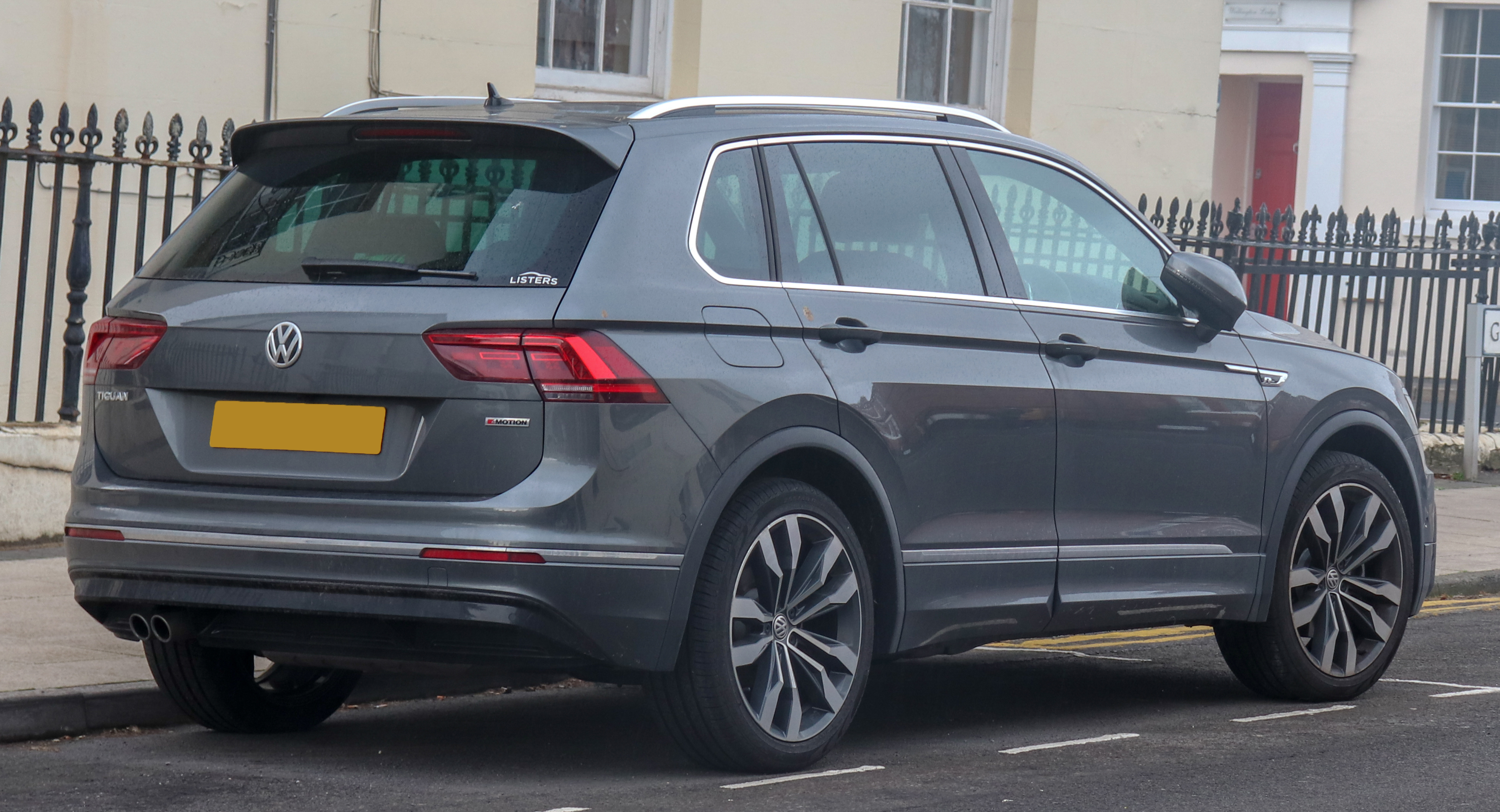
Volkswagen Tiguan R-Line

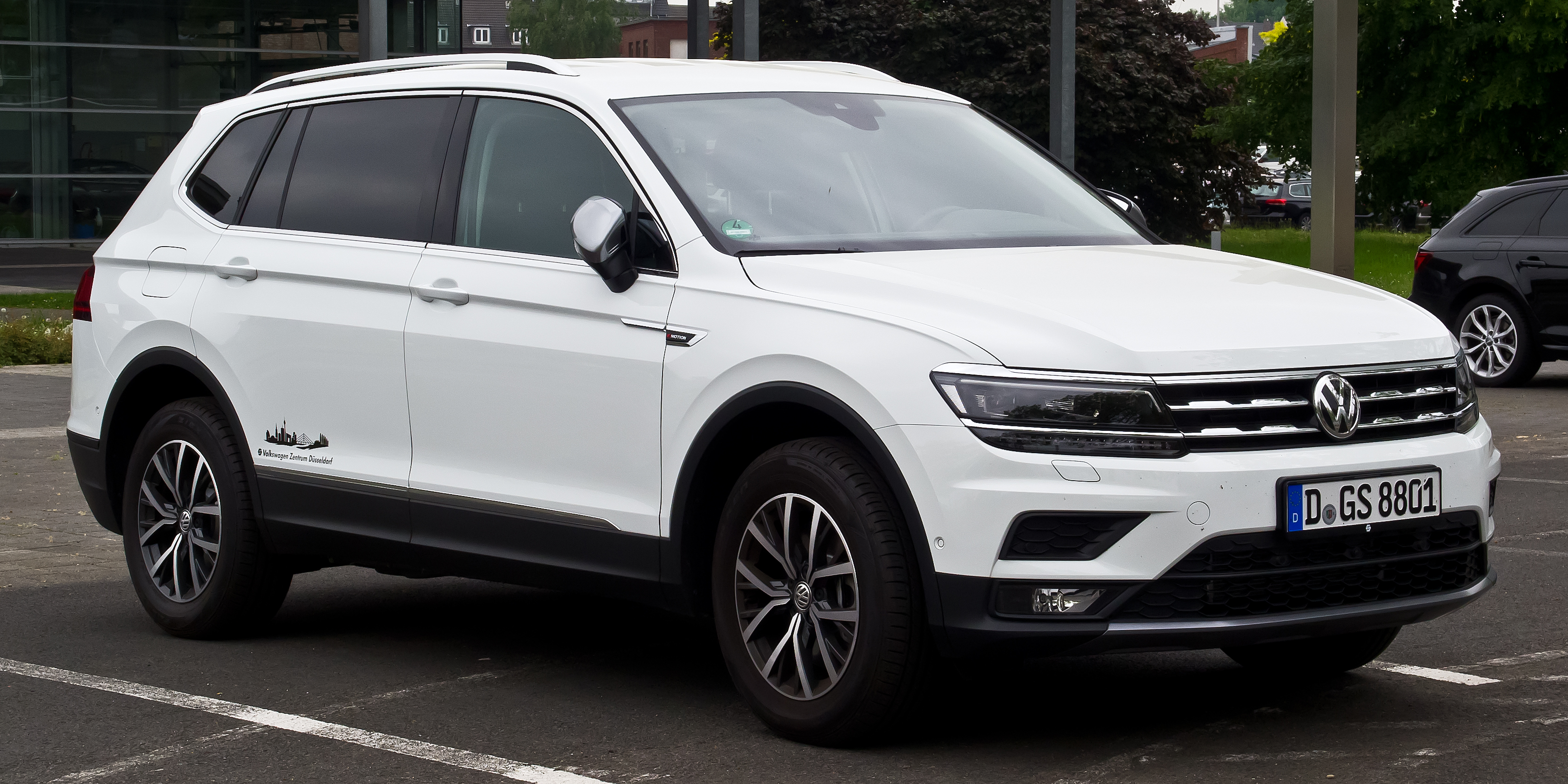
Volkswagen Tiguan Allspace

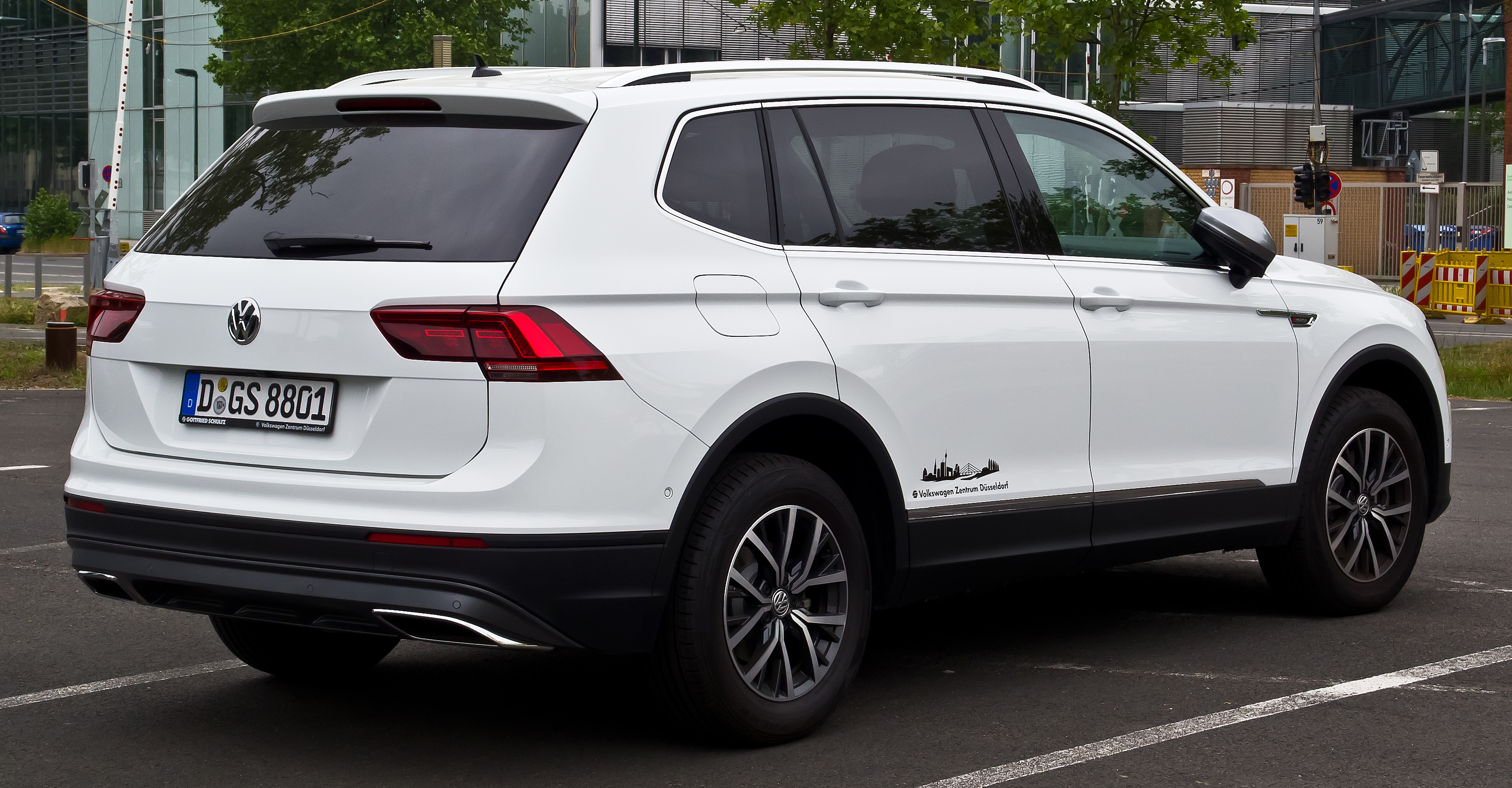
Volkswagen Tiguan Allspace

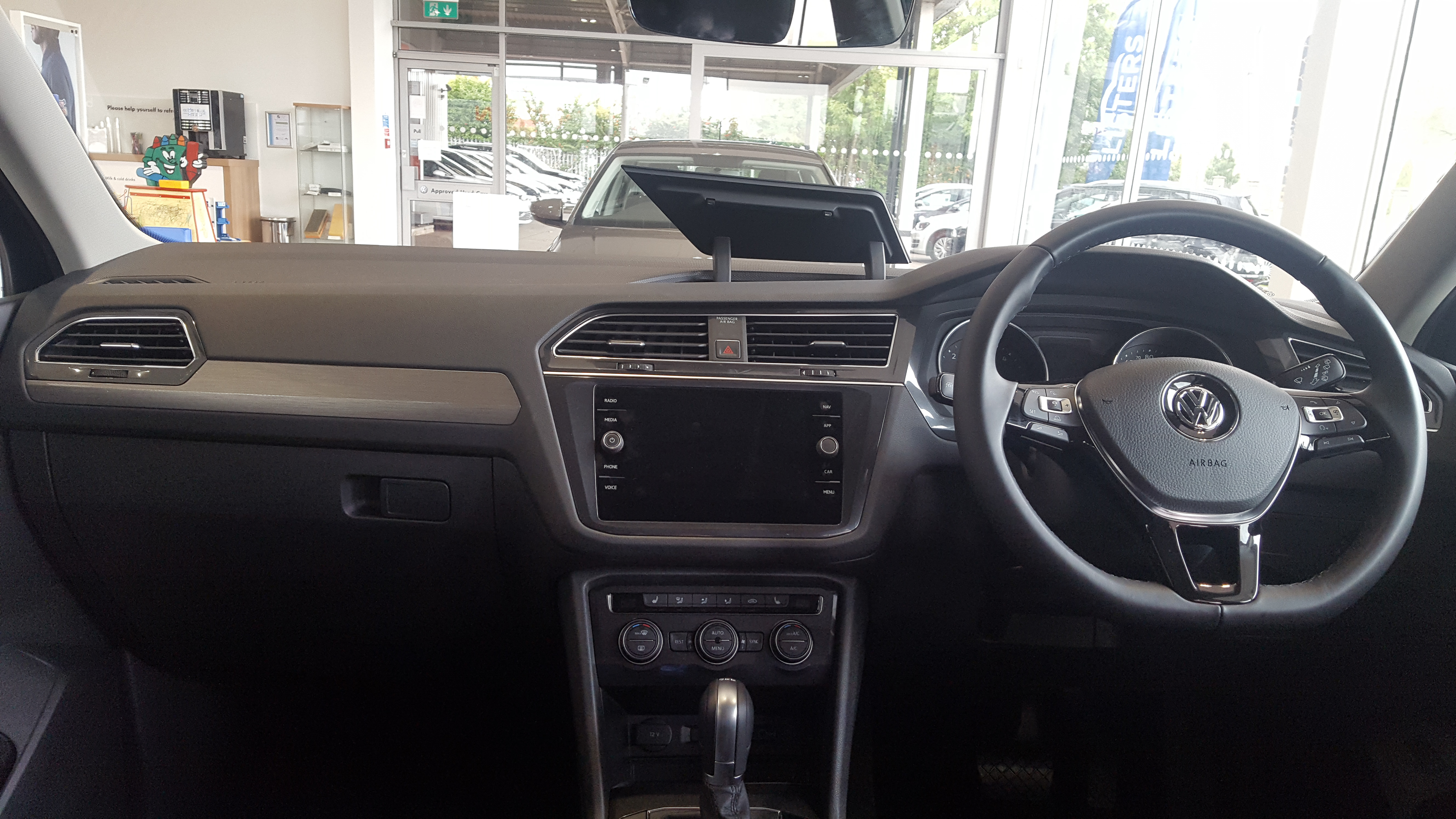
Interior

=== Facelift ===
The updated Tiguan was released on 30 June 2020, along with the introduction of the Tiguan R and Tiguan eHybrid. The updated Tiguan features newly designed headlamps, radiator grille, and broader bumper intakes similar to the Mk8 Golf, along with a new bonnet, LED tail lights, and rear diffuser. A new multifunction 'digital' steering wheel is offered and a redesigned centre dashboard incorporates a new touchscreen display with VW’s MIB3 software. It is also equipped with Volkswagen's IQ Drive feature for the first time, which can take over the steering, braking and acceleration of the vehicle.

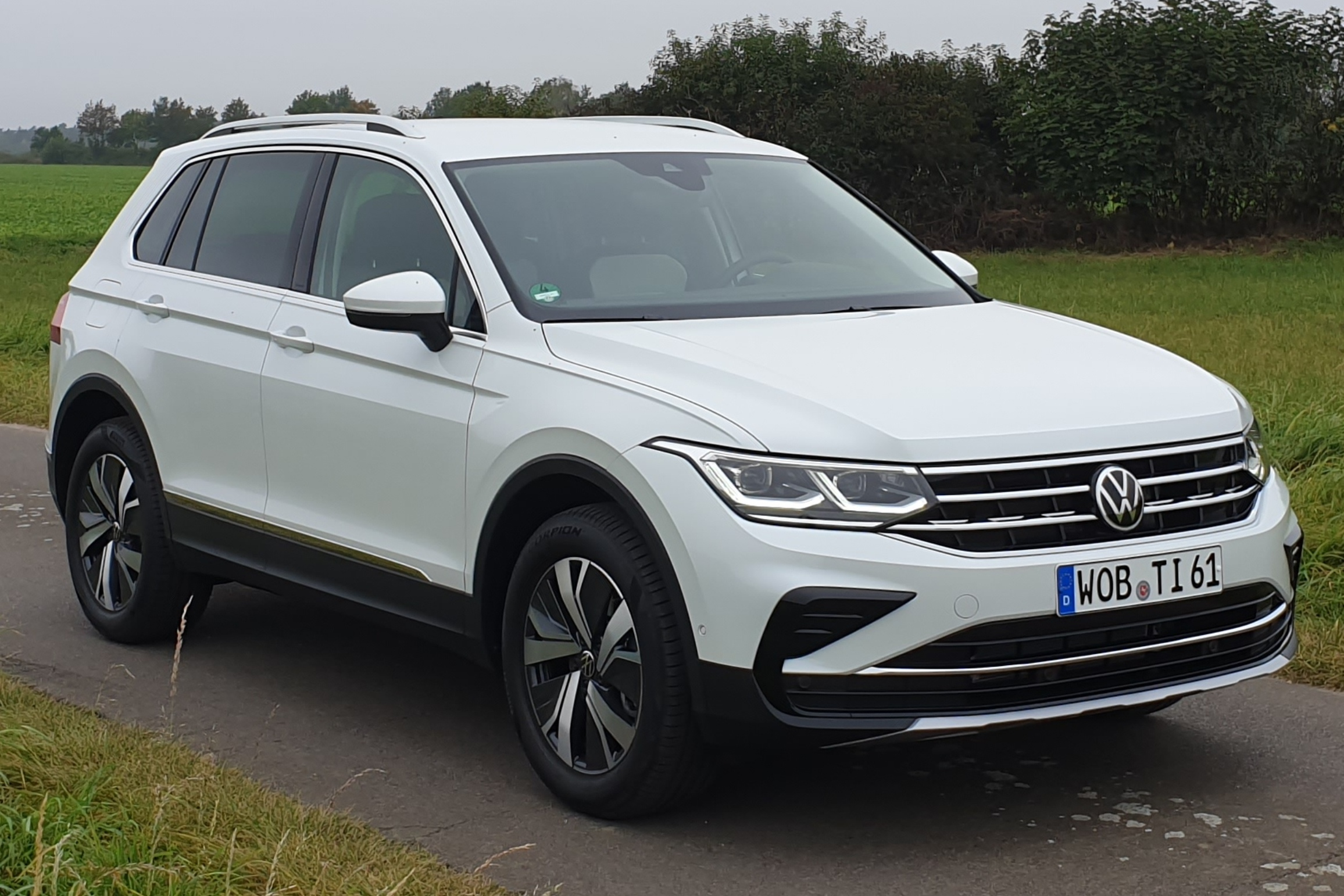
2020 Volkswagen Tiguan eHybrid (facelift)

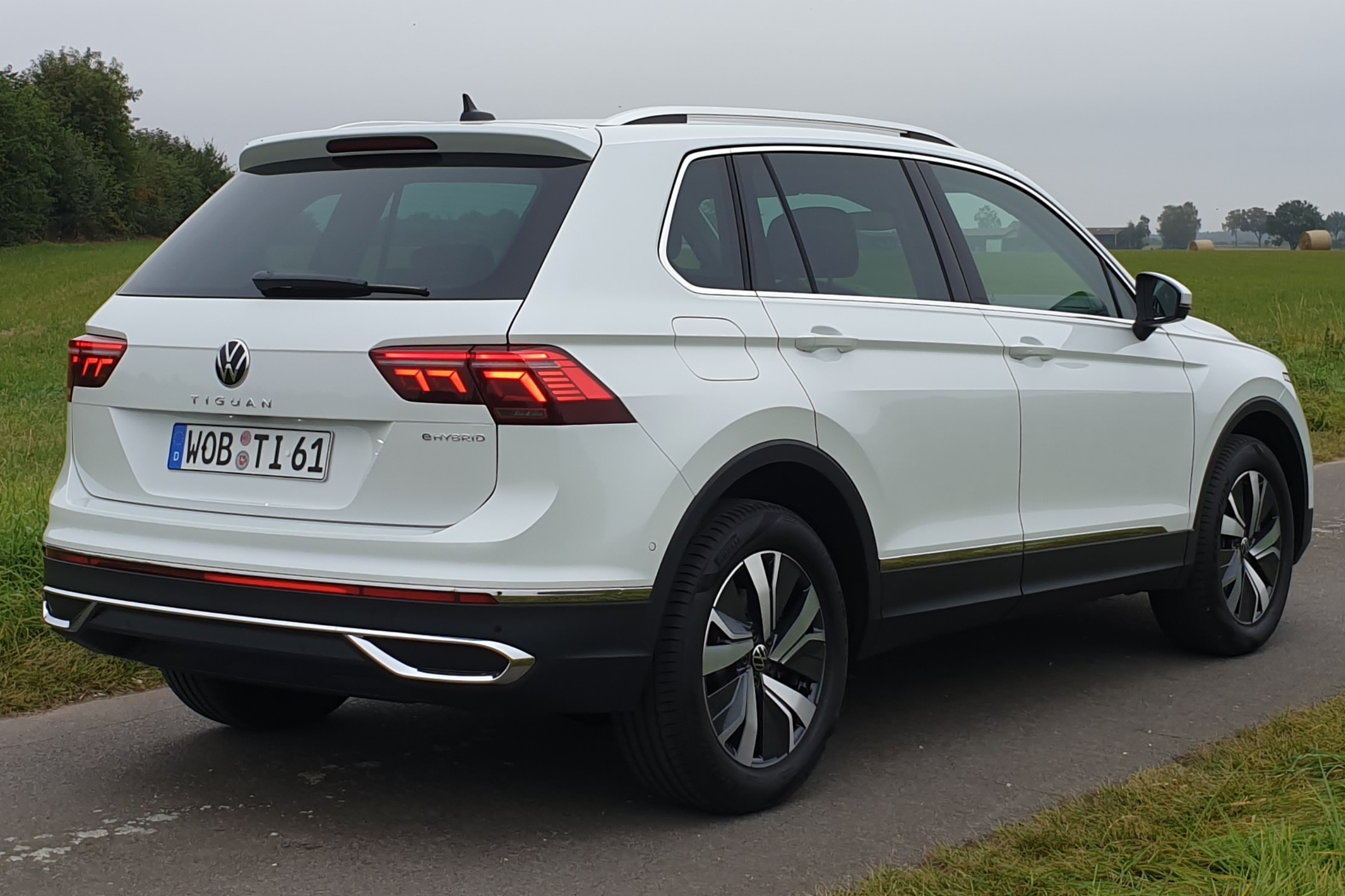
2020 Volkswagen Tiguan eHybrid (facelift)

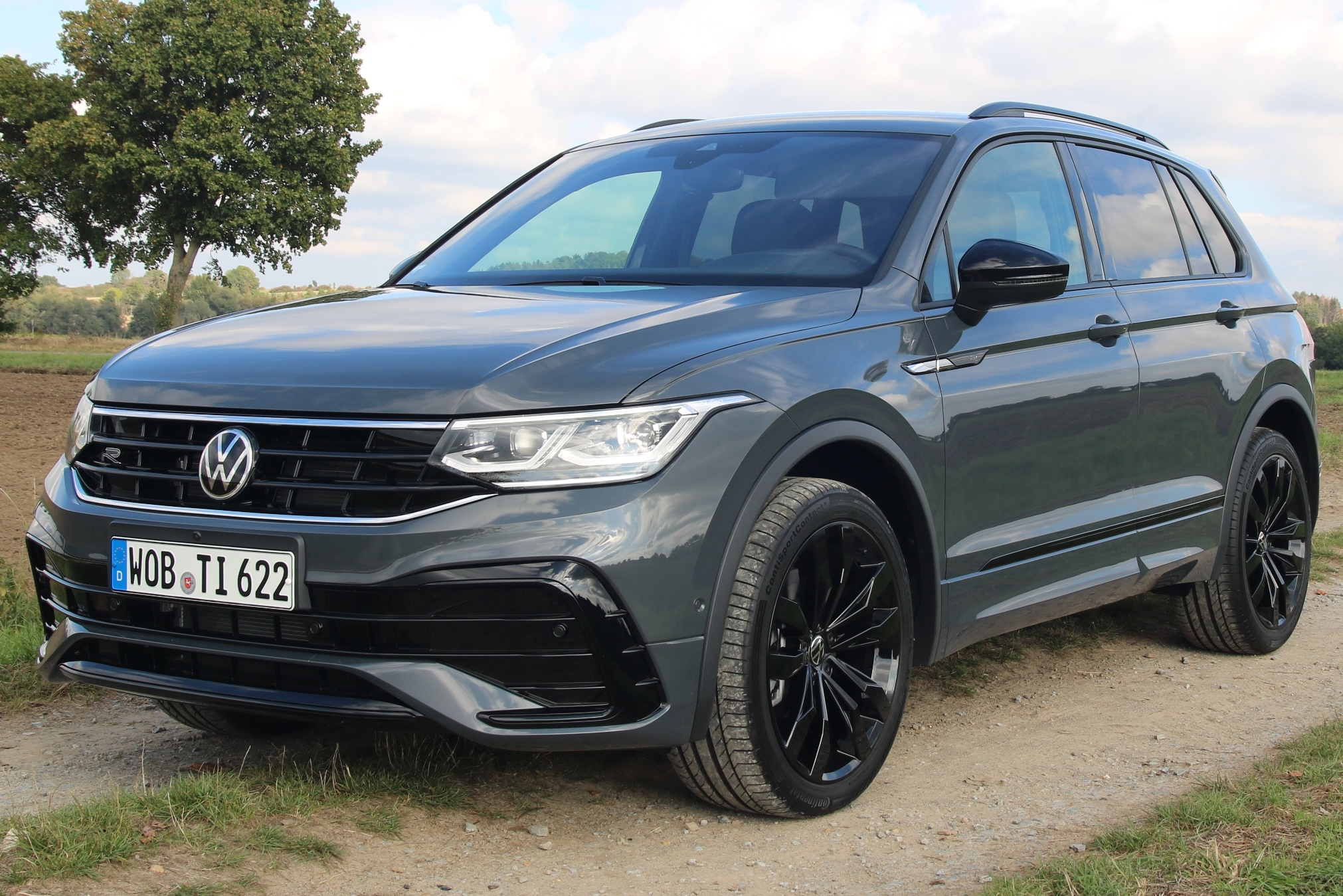
2020 Volkswagen Tiguan R-Line (facelift)

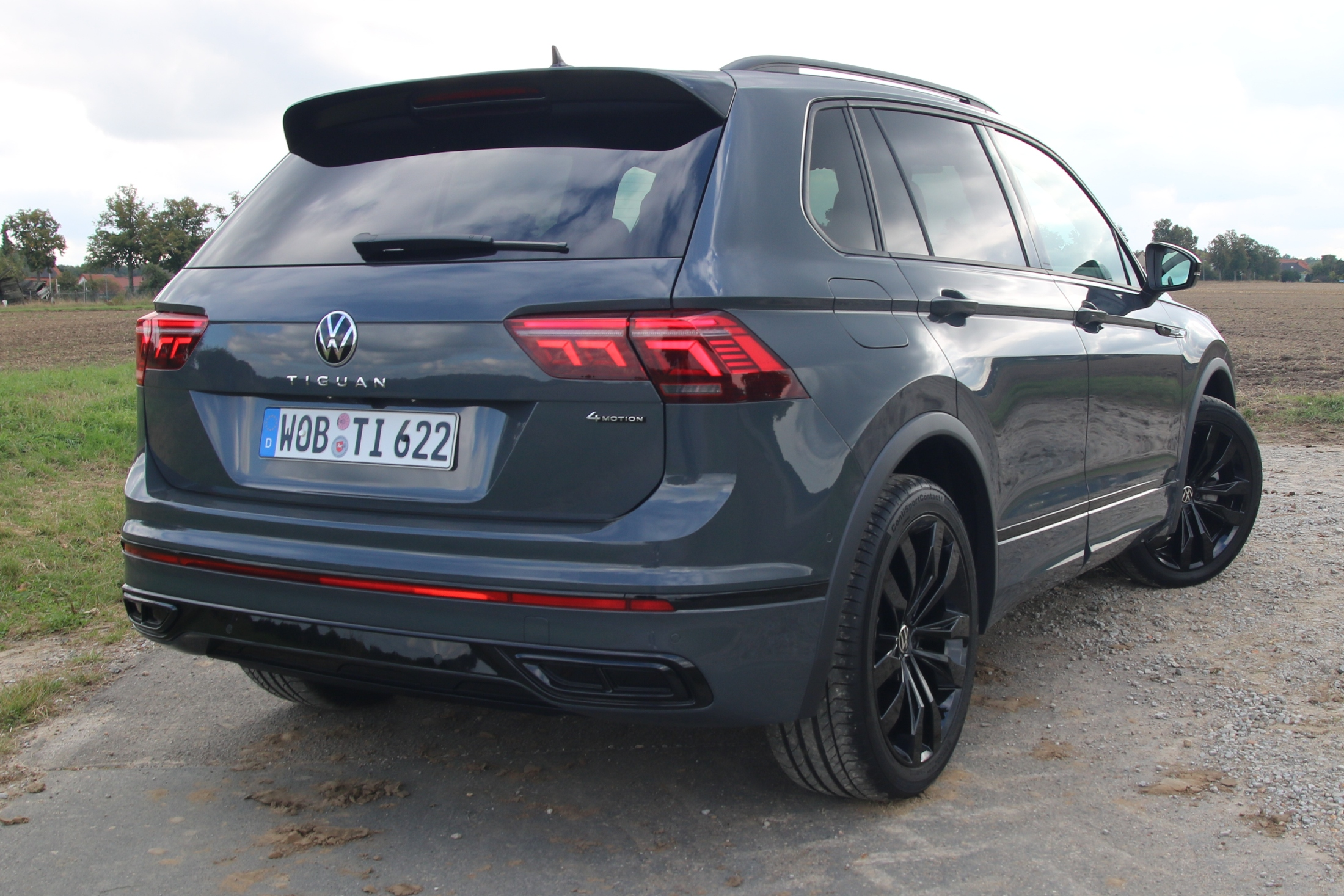
2020 Volkswagen Tiguan R-Line (facelift)

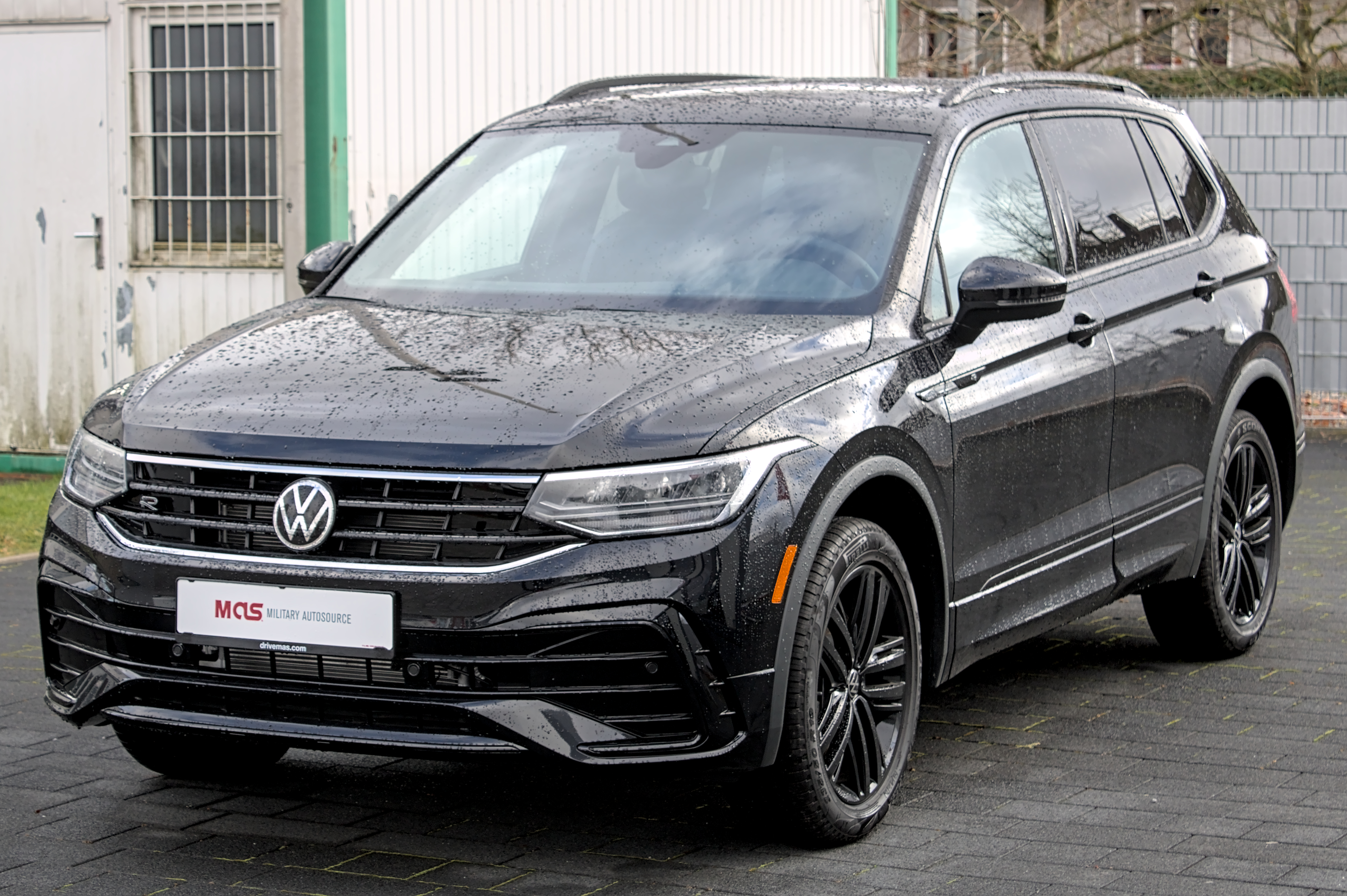
2021 Volkswagen Tiguan R-Line (LWB, US; facelift)

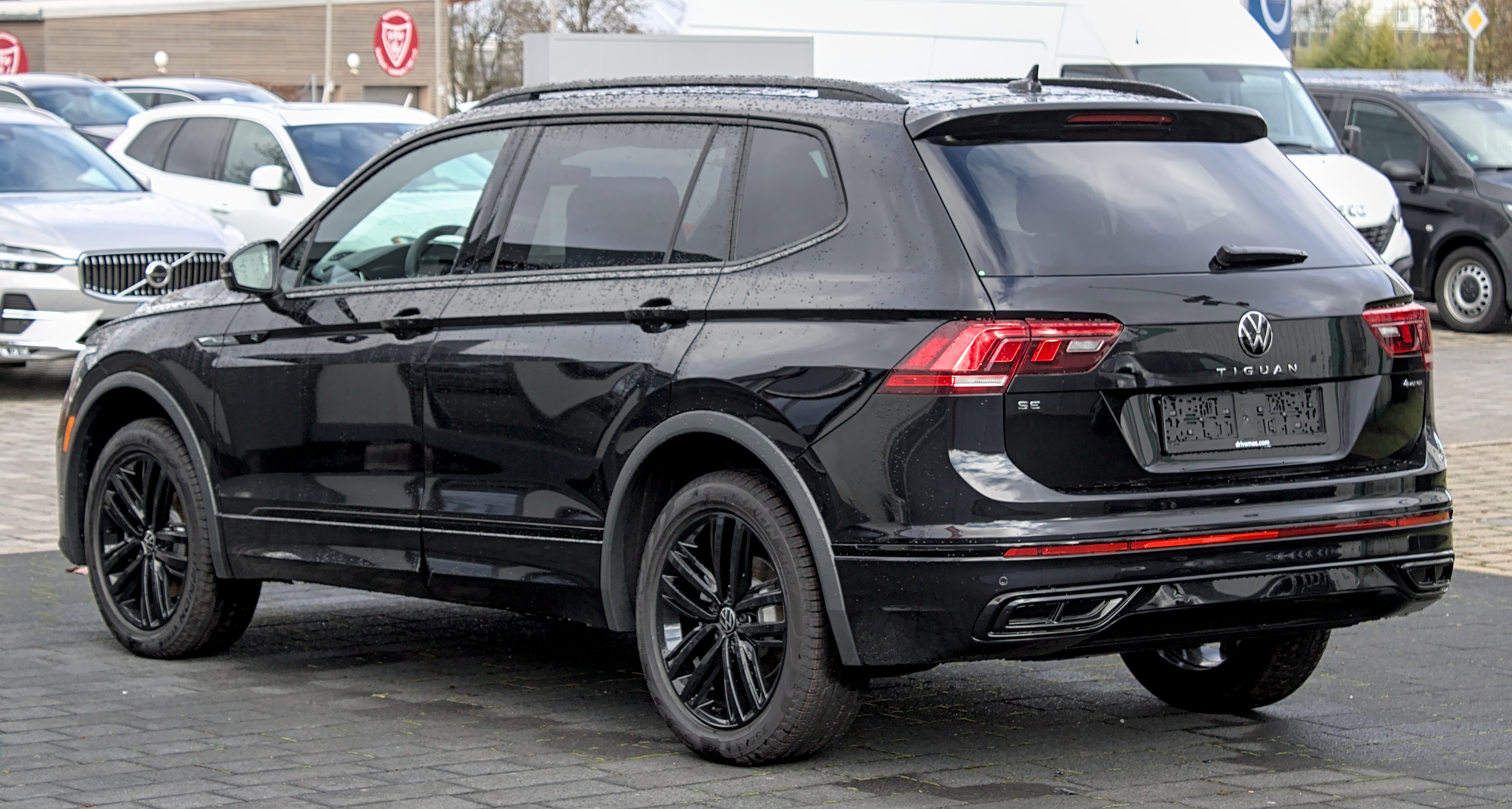
2021 Volkswagen Tiguan R-Line (LWB, US; facelift)

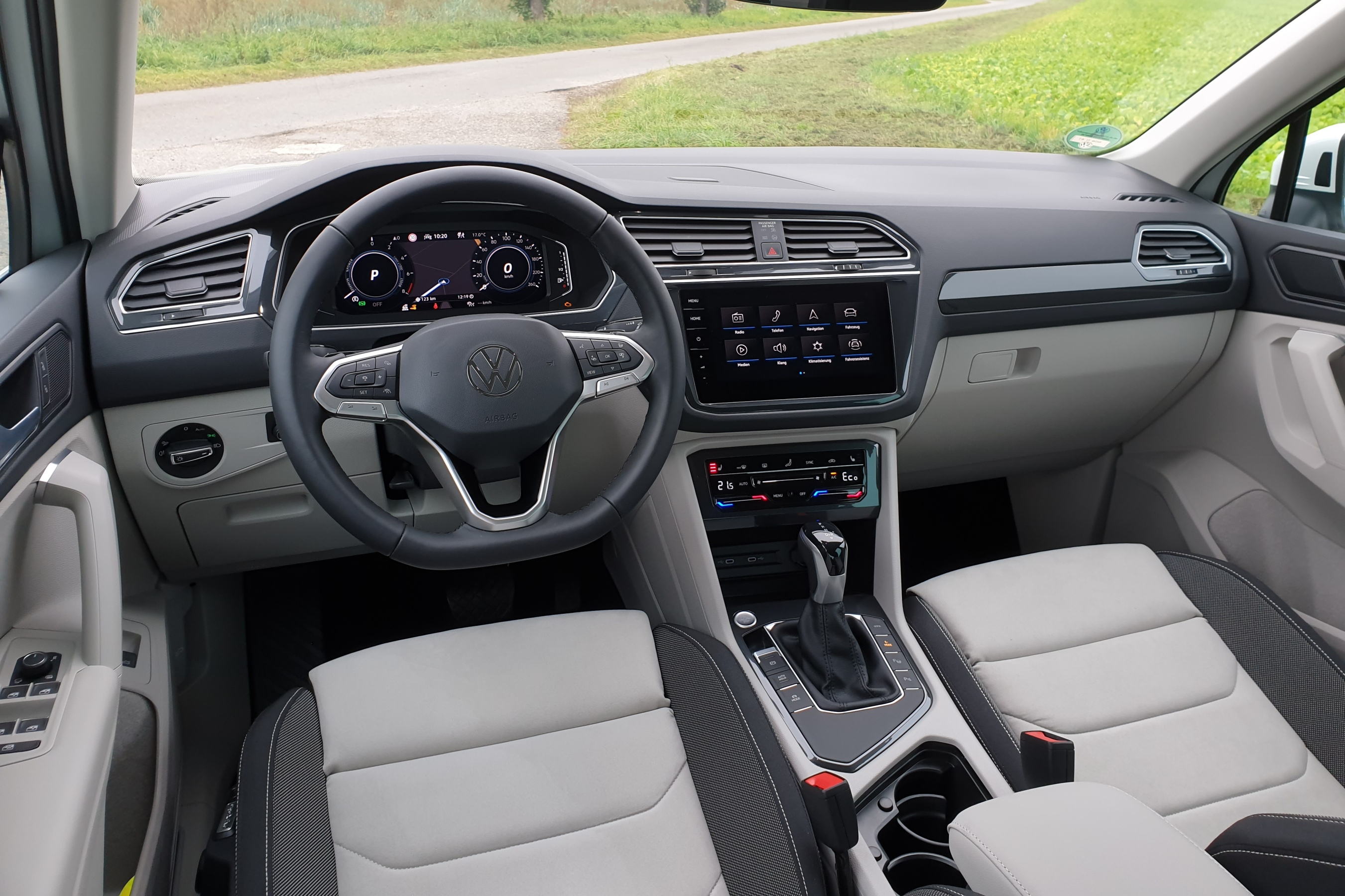
Interior

=== Tiguan R ===
For the first time, the Tiguan line-up also includes the performance-oriented R variant. Released in 2020 alongside the facelifted model, the Tiguan R is powered by a new 2.0-litre turbocharged inline-4 that delivers 320 PS (235 kW; 316 hp) and 420 N⋅m (310 lb⋅ft), shared with the Arteon R and the Mk8 Golf R. The engine is mated to an all-wheel-drive system which has the ability to split torque between the axles and between the rear wheels. Other performance upgrades of the Tiguan R include lowered suspension, 21-inch wheels, upgraded brakes, and an available Akrapovič exhaust. A driving mode selector is included complete with a “Race” setting which can be prompted by a dedicated button on the steering wheel.

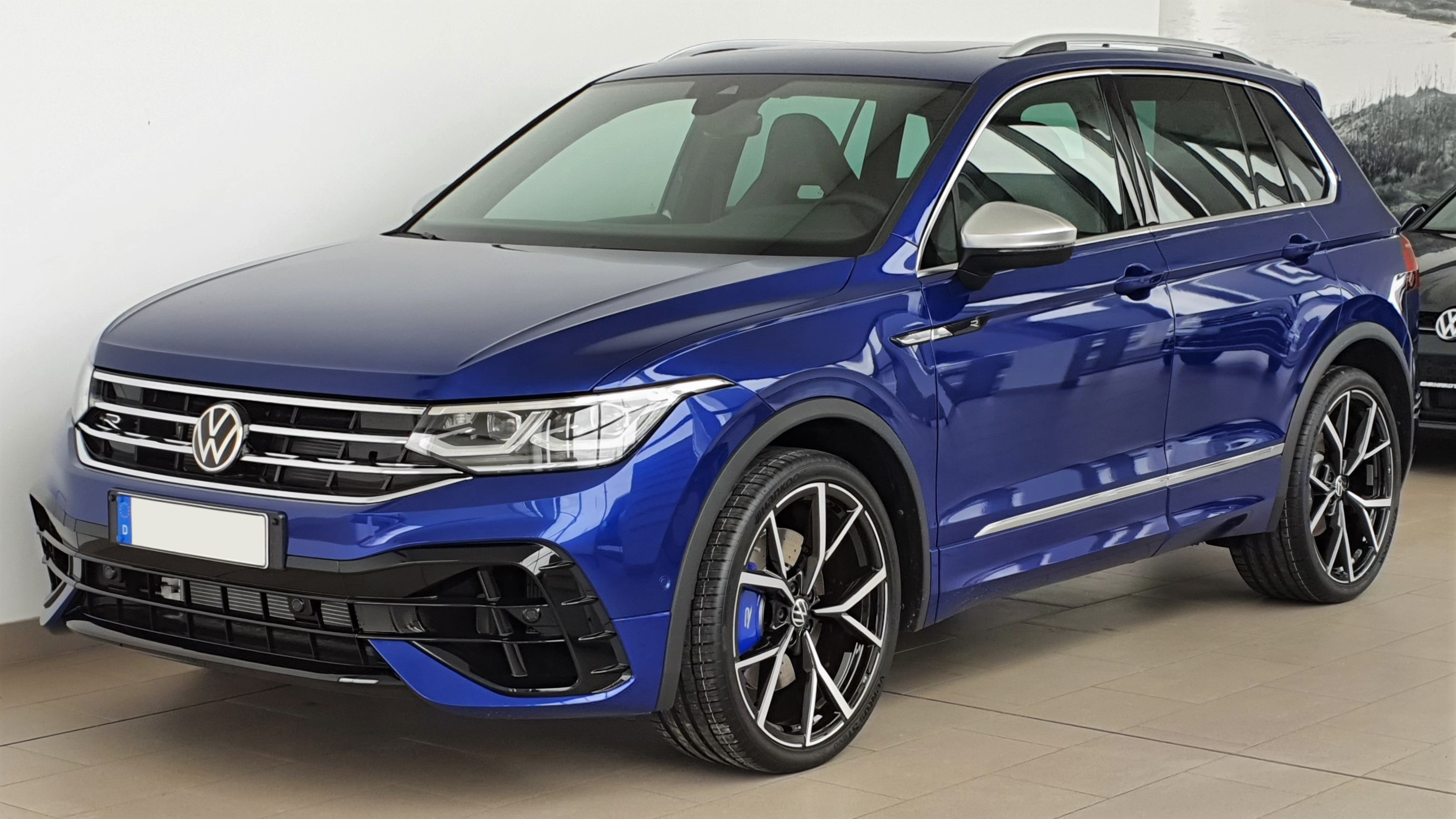
2020 Volkswagen Tiguan R

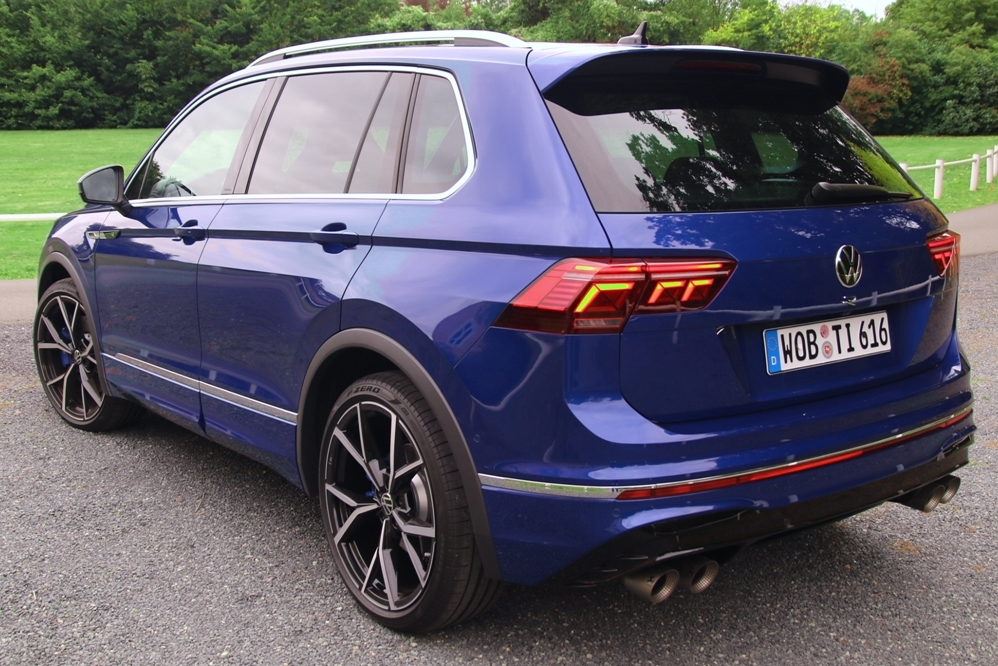
2020 Volkswagen Tiguan R

=== Tiguan X ===
A coupé SUV version of the Tiguan was revealed in China as the Tiguan X in September 2020. The styling is based on the facelifted Tiguan and the chassis is based on the long wheelbase version of the Tiguan which means it retains its 2,791 mm (109.9 in) wheelbase. The variant is offered with a 2.0-litre TSI petrol engine with 190 PS (187 hp; 140 kW) and 320 N⋅m (33 kg⋅m; 236 lb⋅ft) or the range-topping 220 PS (217 hp; 162 kW) and 380 N⋅m (39 kg⋅m; 280 lb⋅ft), both paired with a 7-speed DSG transmission.

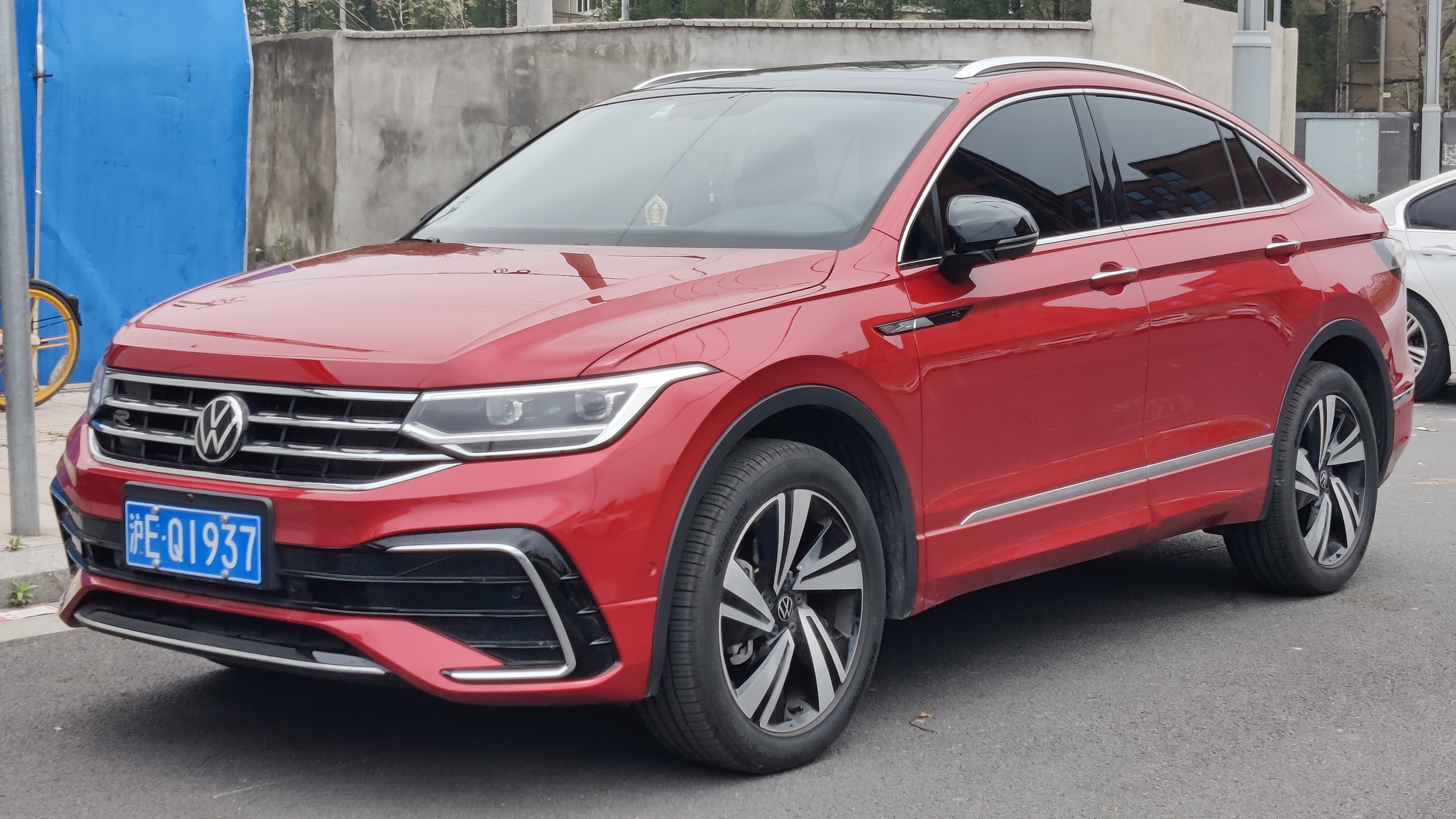
Volkswagen Tiguan X (China)

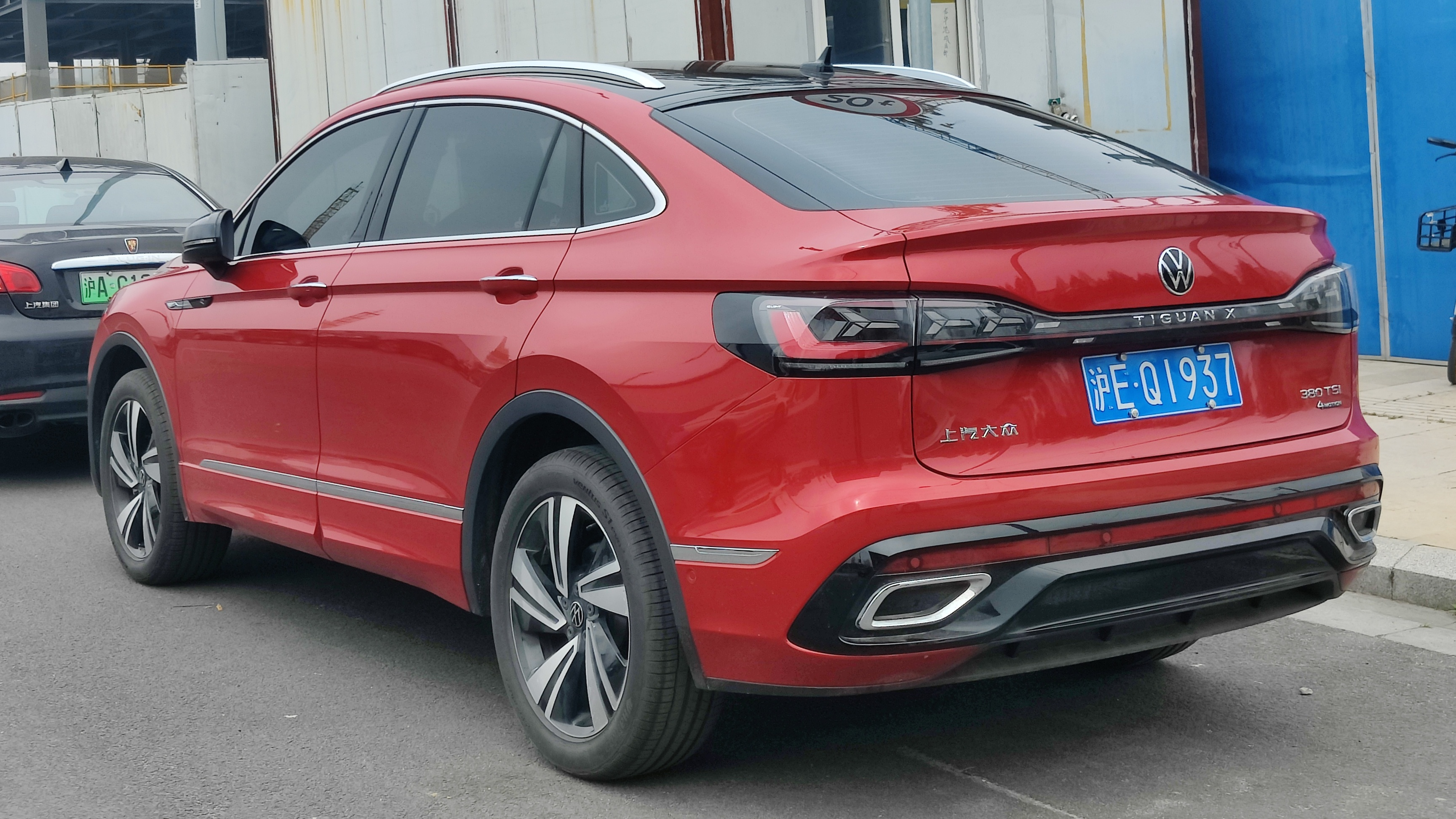
Volkswagen Tiguan X (China)

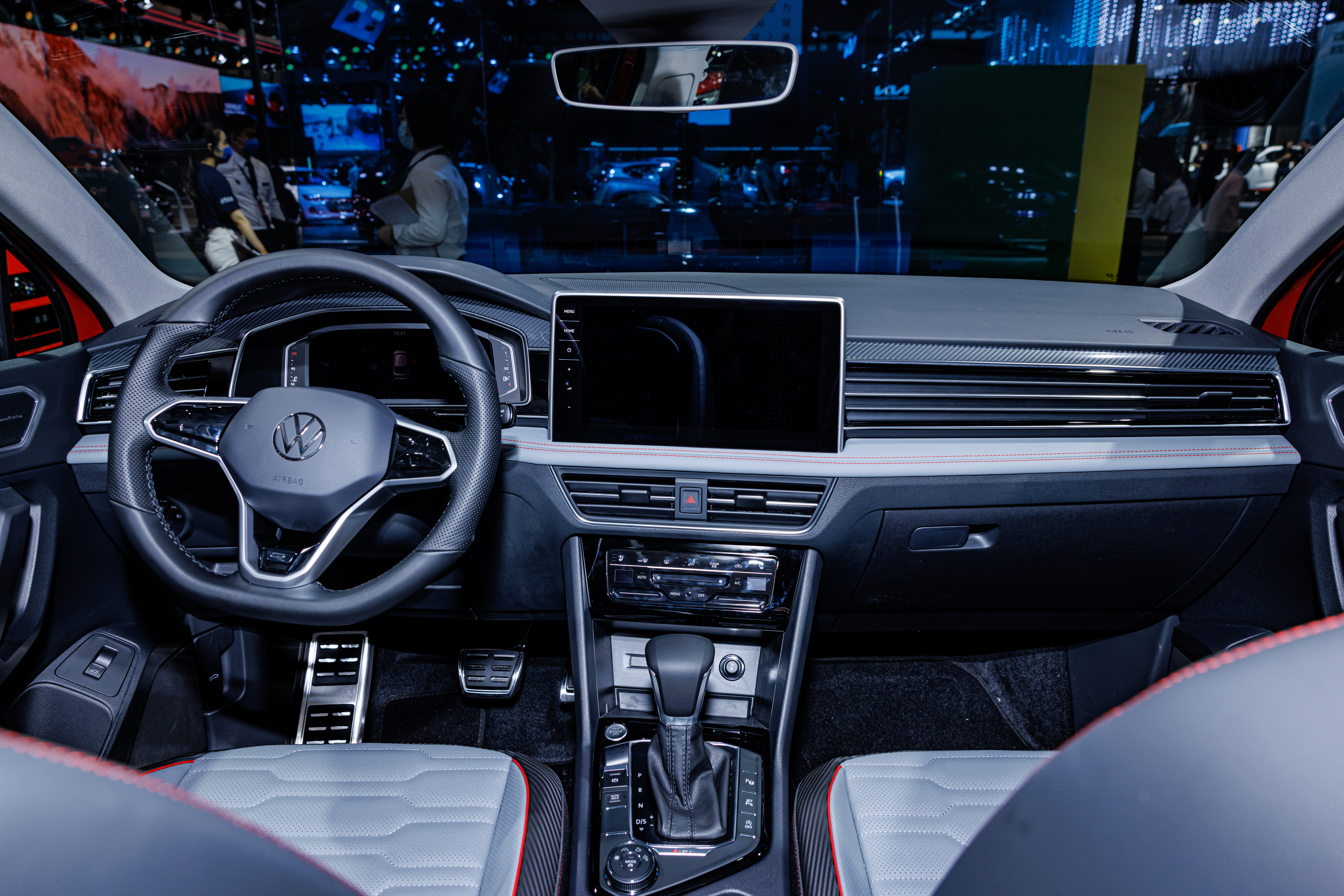
Interior (China)

=== Markets ===
==== North America ====
The second-generation Tiguan was unveiled for the North American market at the 2017 North American International Auto Show, with sales starting in summer 2017 for the 2018 model year. It is solely available in with a long-wheelbase body, known as the Tiguan Allspace in most markets. At launch in the US, it was offered in four trim levels: S, SE, SEL and SEL Premium and 3 in Canada: Trendline, Comfortline and Highline. The R-Line Package later became available for the SEL and SEL Premium models (Highline in Canada) in early 2018, and was showcased at the 2017 Los Angeles Auto Show. In the US market, it was available in front-wheel drive or Volkswagen's 4Motion all-wheel drive system, with third-row seats being standard on front-wheel drive models and optional on all-wheel drive models. Only one engine choice was available for the North American-spec Tiguan, a 2.0-litre TSI four-cylinder gasoline engine, mated with an 8-speed torque converter automatic transmission.

The Tiguan was updated for the North American market in 2021 for the 2022 model year, with similar exterior and interior changes as the short wheelbase European model. Standard LED lights, a different grille, as well as new wheel designs are present. On the interior, there is a new steering wheel as well as a standard 8-inch digital gauge cluster. The infotainment system was updated with wireless Apple CarPlay and Android Auto being offered on all but the base model. The Tiguan's powertrain remains unchanged, and the third row option is no longer being offered on AWD models.

The 2022 Tiguan has new standard safety features: blind-spot monitoring, forward-collision warning, and rear traffic alert. Other safety features are available, for instance automatic high beam, parking assist, and dynamic road sign recognition. All trims but the base 2022 Tiguan come with the "IQ.Drive" safety suite, which includes features such as forward-collision warning, autonomous emergency braking with pedestrian monitoring, blind-spot monitoring, lane keep assist, adaptive cruise control, and travel assist (semi-automated or Level 2 driving assistance).

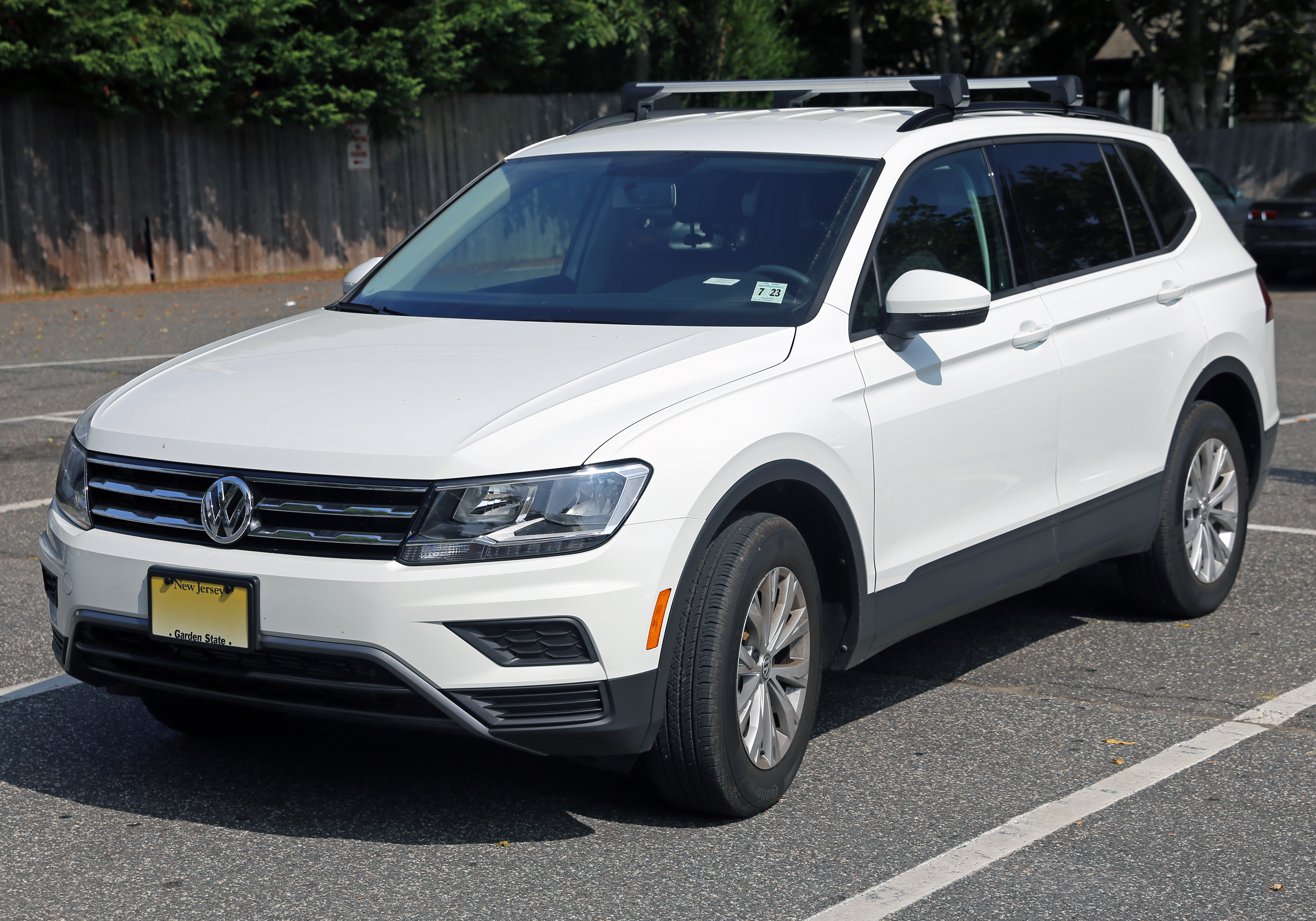
2018 Volkswagen Tiguan S 4Motion (United States)

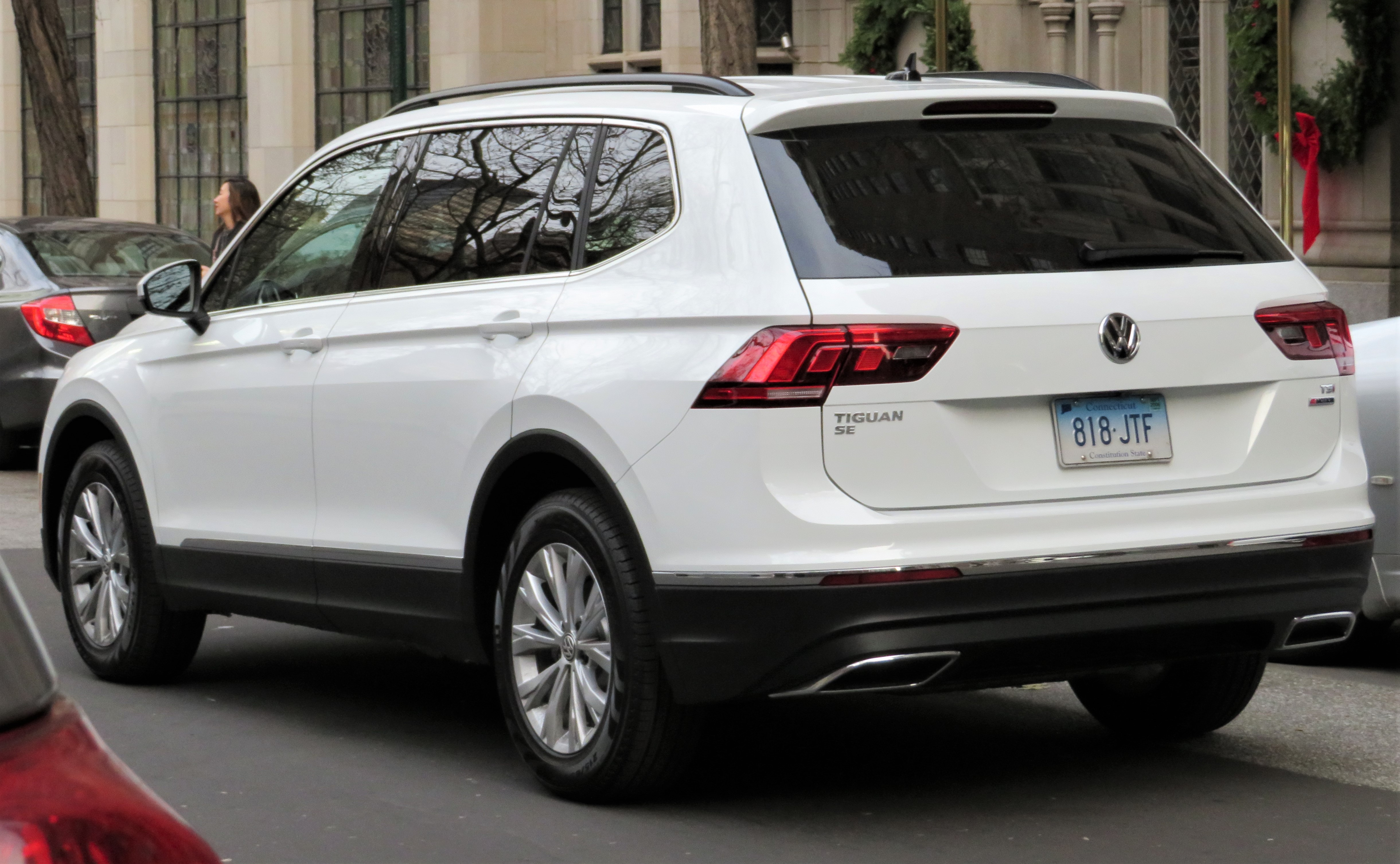
2018 Volkswagen Tiguan (United States)

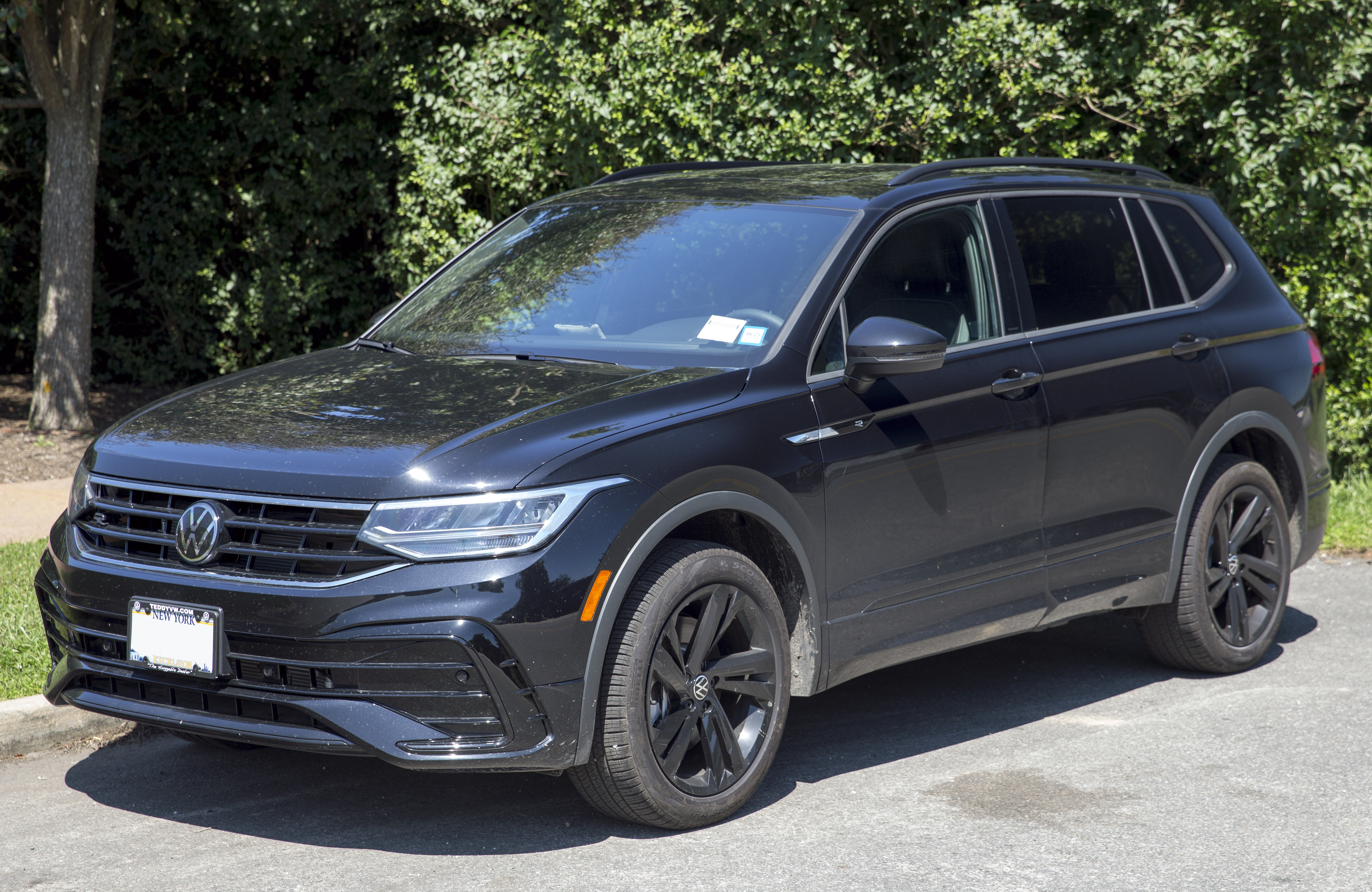
2024 Volkswagen Tiguan 4Motion SE R-Line Black (United States; facelift)

==== Mexico ====
The second generation Volkswagen Tiguan was launched in Mexico, around the same time as the North American launch, with sales starts at the same time as the US models for the 2018 model year. Like the US and Canadian models, it was only available as a LWB variant with optional third-row seats and initially available in four trim levels: Trendline, Trendline Plus, Comfortline, and Highline. The R-Line was later added to the Mexican lineup as a separated trim level. The lower trim levels of the Tiguan were powered by a 1.4-litre TSI engine, a 2.0-litre TSI engine was only available to the Highline model. The Mexican-built Tiguan was qualified 5 stars by Latin NCAP 2.0 in 2019 in both infant and adult passengers, and was awarded two Latin NCAP Advanced Awards, one for its pedestrian safety system and other for AEB (Autonomous Emergency Braking).

The locally-built Tiguan was later facelifted for the Mexican market on 9 September 2021 for the 2022 model year, discontinuing the Trendline Plus and Highline trim levels.

==== China ====
The second generation Tiguan was launched in China by SAIC-Volkswagen in January 2017, available in both SWB and LWB variants and sold alongside the previous generation Tiguan, which was continued to be sold in China as the Tiguan Silk Road. The LWB Tiguan is marketed there as the Tiguan L. Both Chinese-spec Tiguans are locally assembled and offered in three trim levels: 280TSI, 330TSI and 380TSI. SAIC Volkswagen only produces Tiguan L and X; the SWB version was imported from Germany. A fastback variant based on the post-facelift model called the Tiguan X was available from October 2020. The 280TSI receives the 1.4 litre turbocharged four cylinder engine producing 150 horsepower paired with either a 6 speed DSG transmission as standard or an optional 7 speed DSG. 330 TSI models are equipped with a 2 litre unit producing 186 horsepower and 330 horsepower for 380 TSI models paired to the 7 speed DSG transmission as standard.

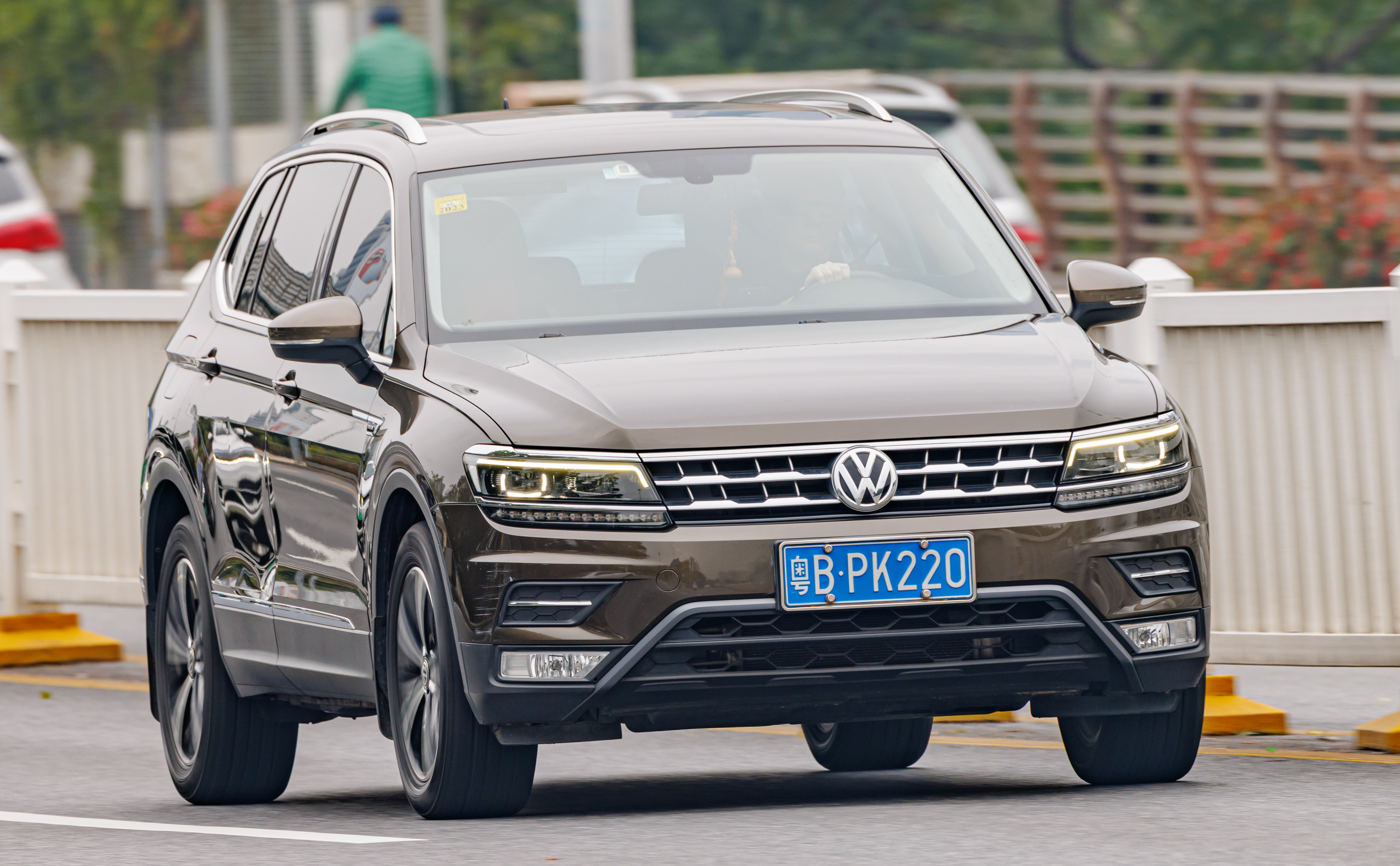
Volkswagen Tiguan L (China)

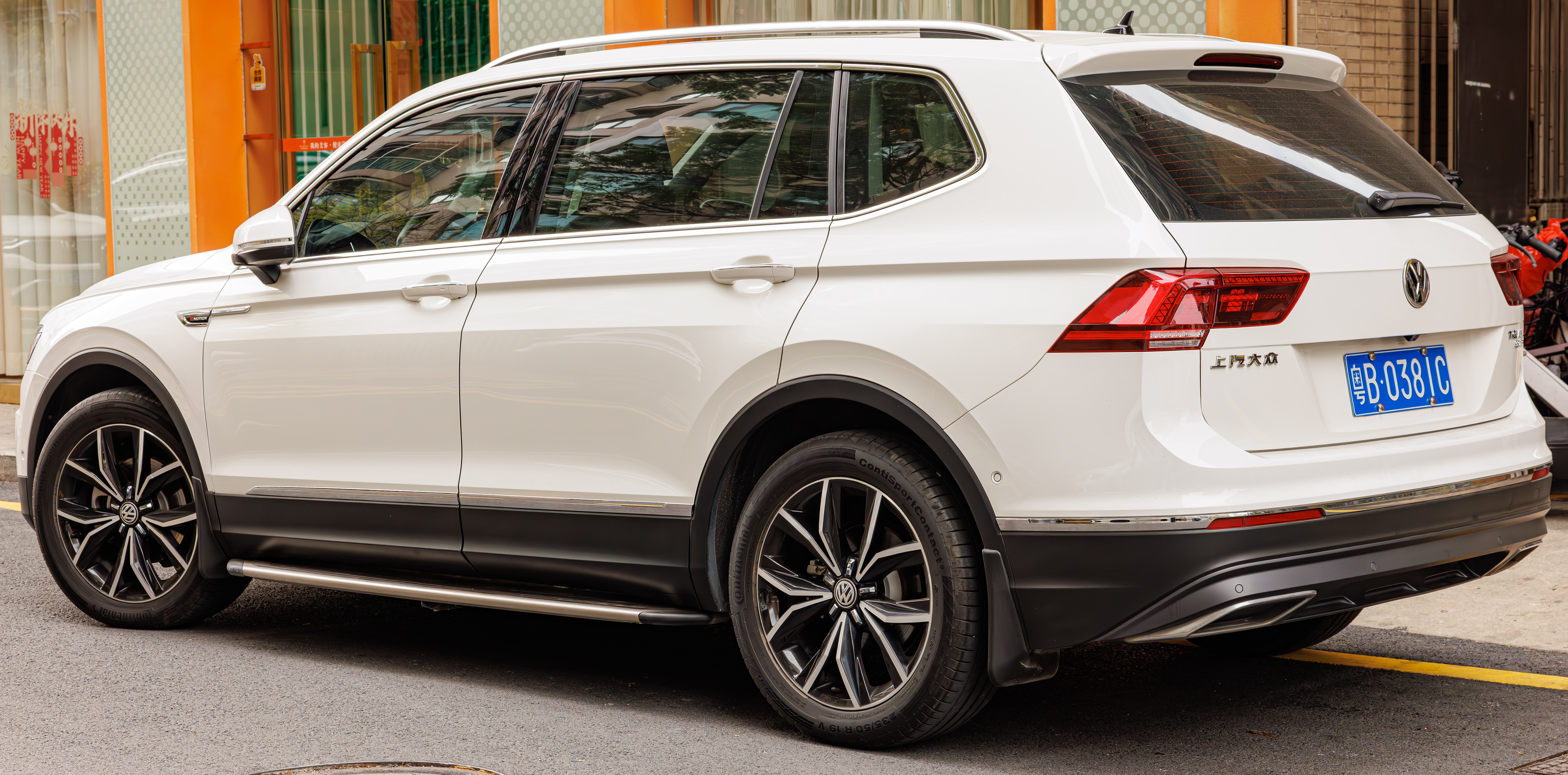
Volkswagen Tiguan L (China)

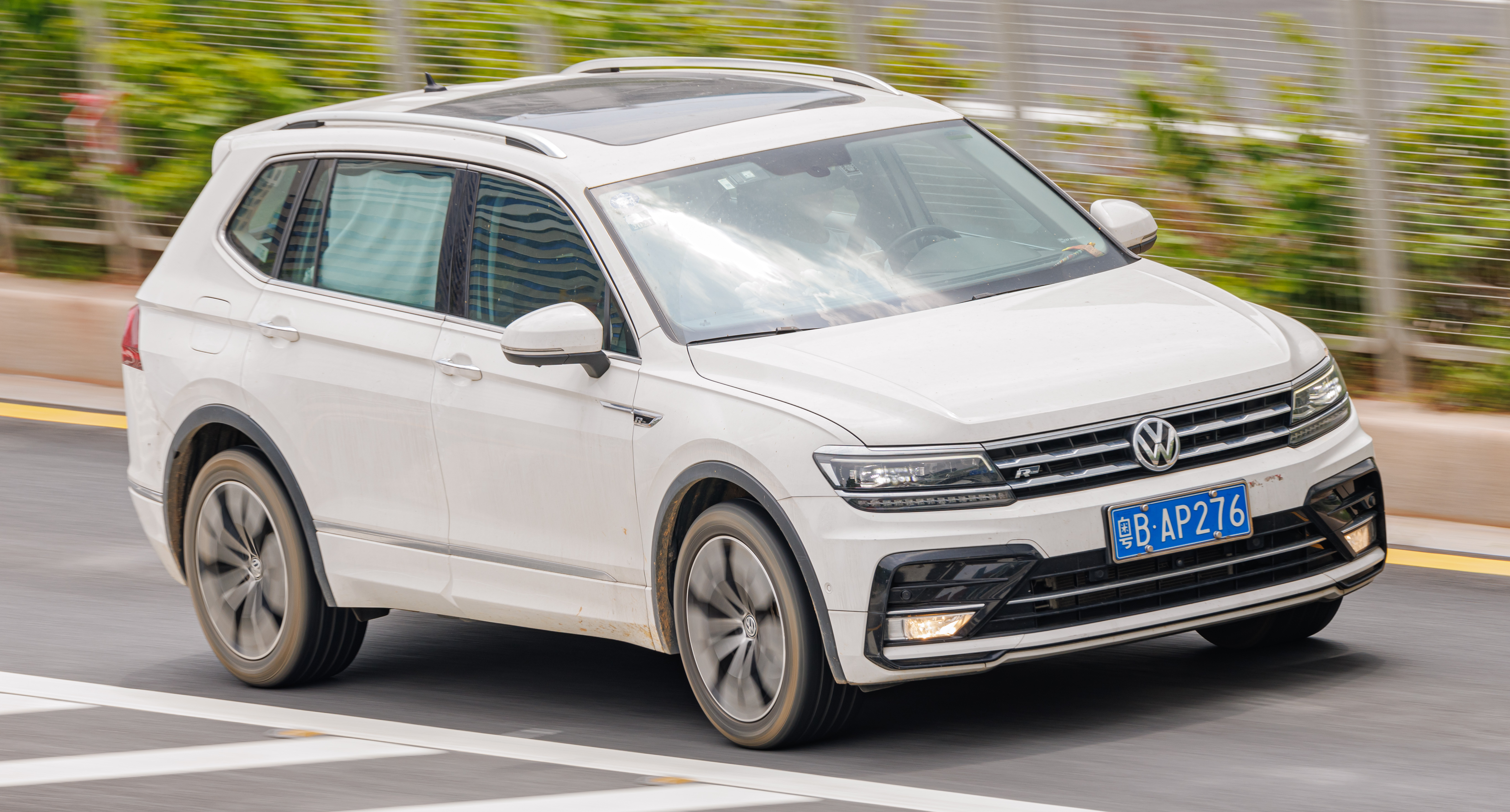
Volkswagen Tiguan L R-Line (China)

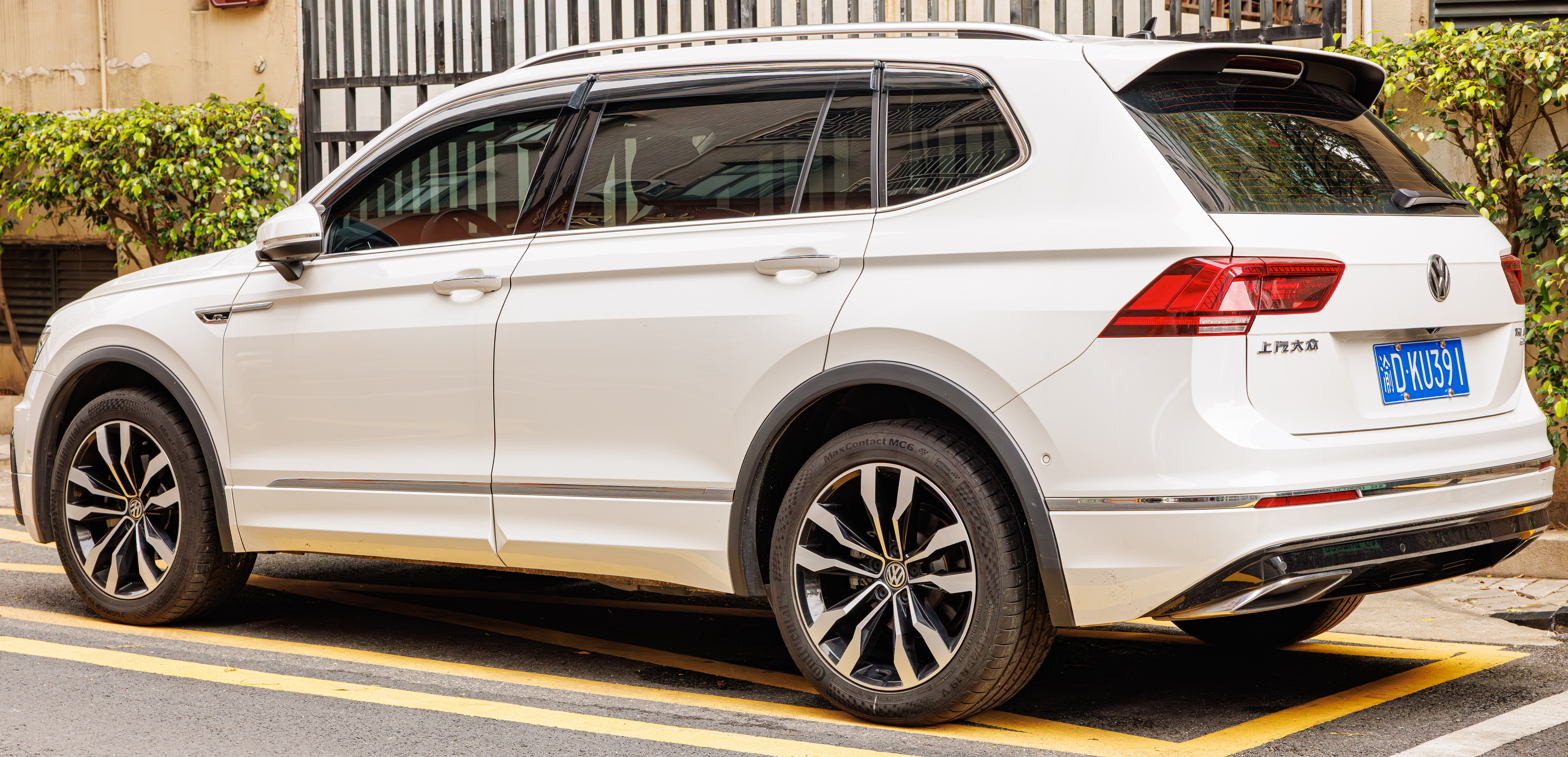
Volkswagen Tiguan L R-Line (China)

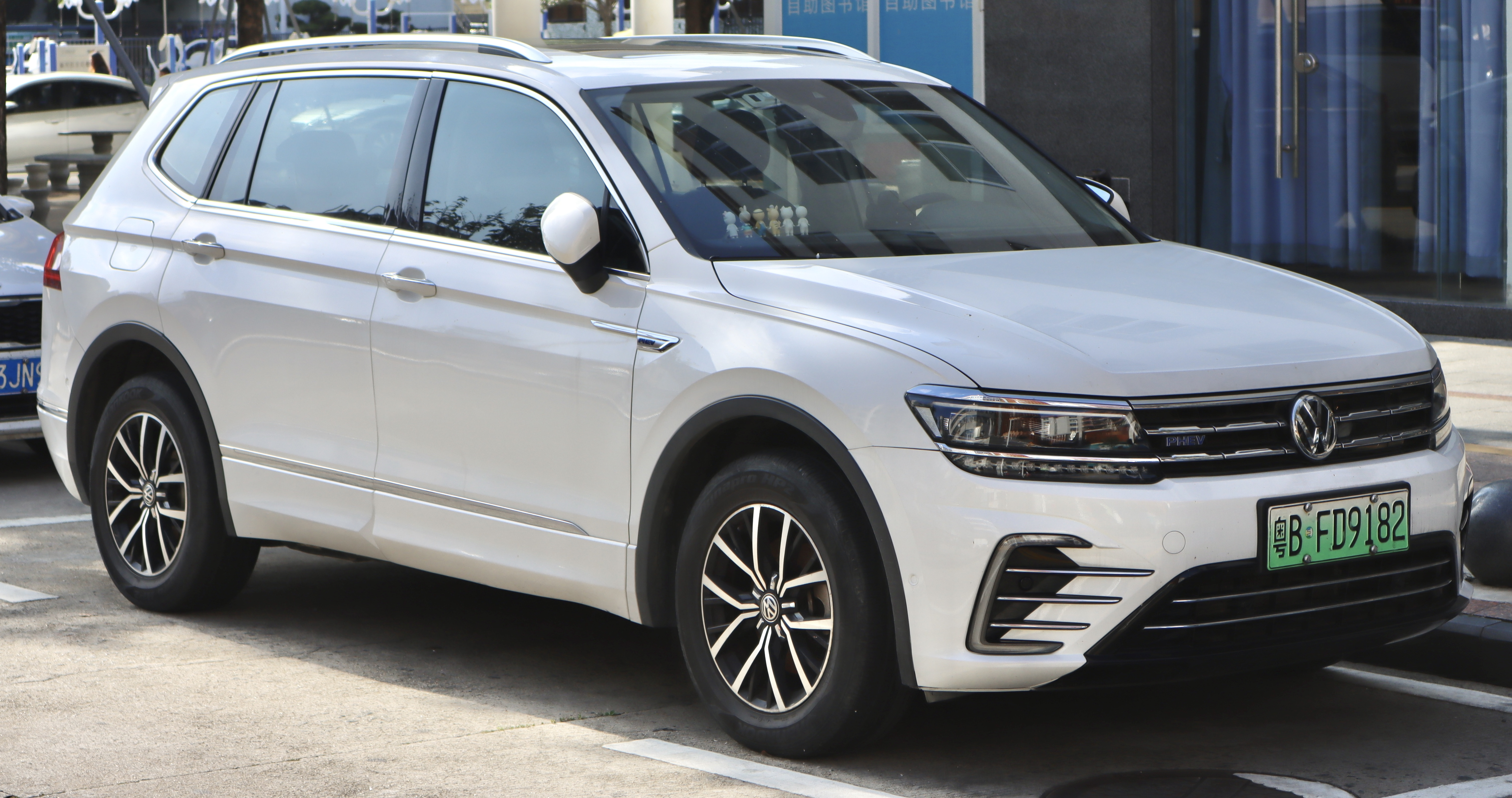
Volkswagen Tiguan L PHEV (China)

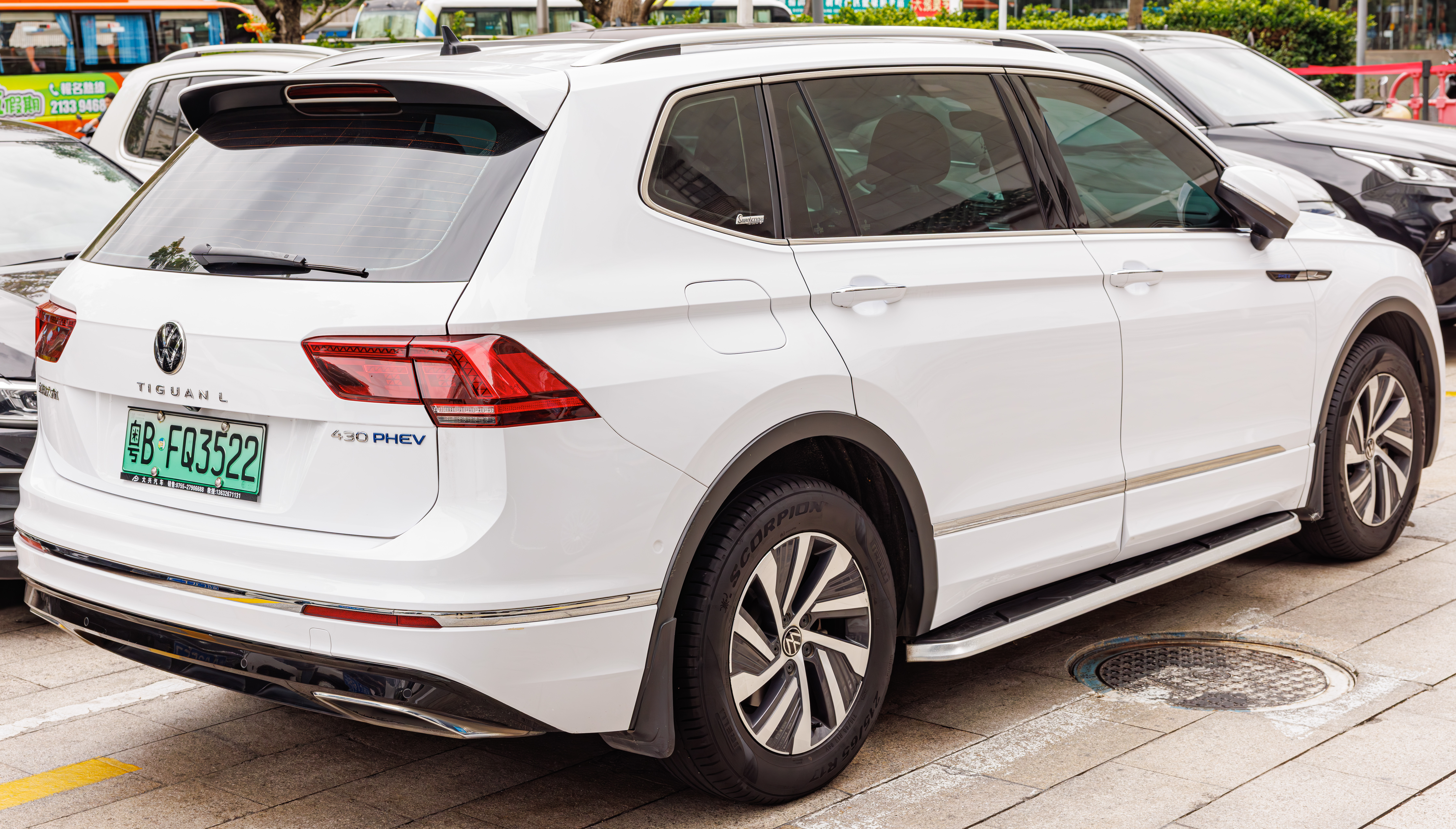
Volkswagen Tiguan L PHEV (China)

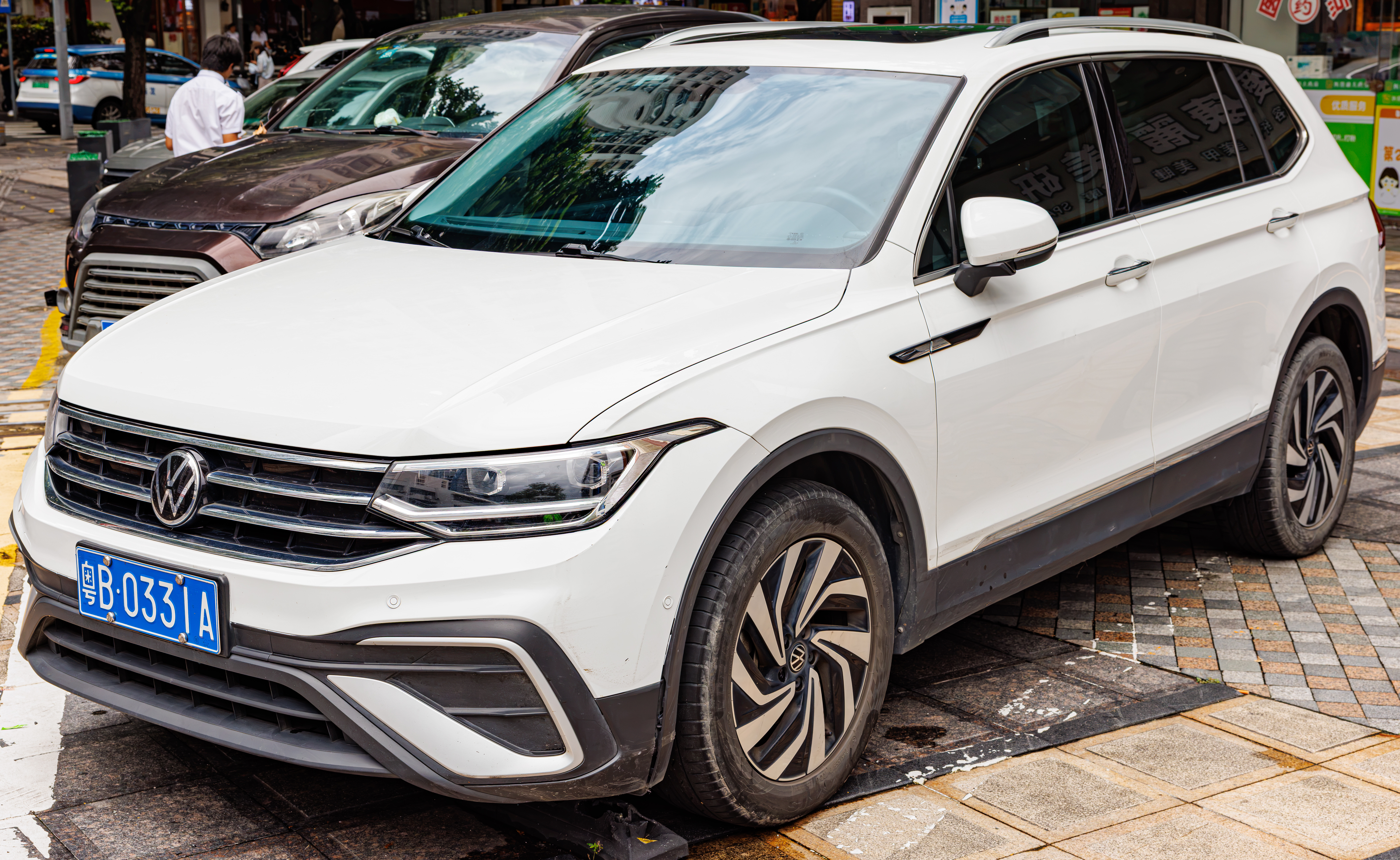
Volkswagen Tiguan L Facelift (China)

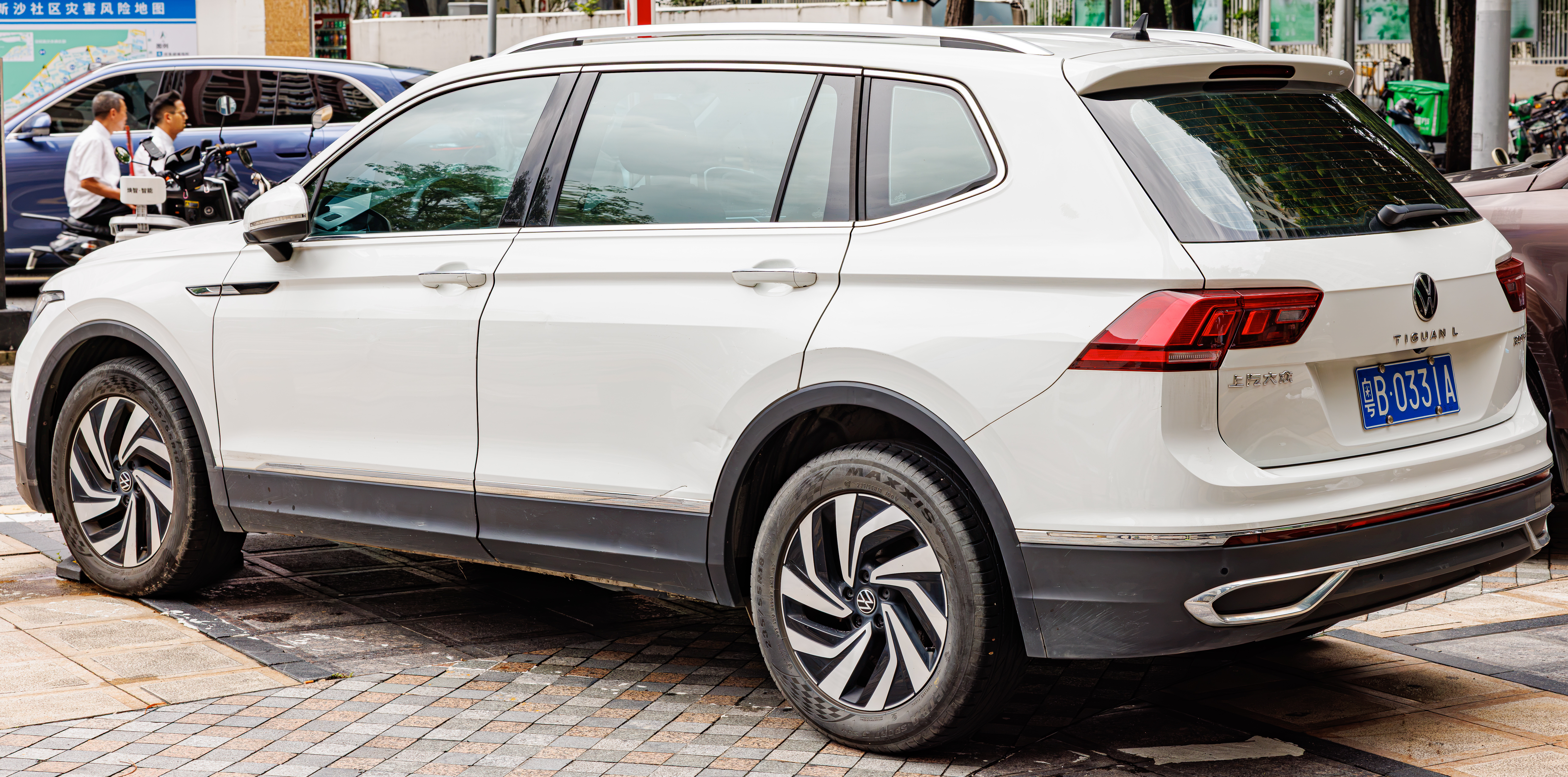
Volkswagen Tiguan L Facelift (China)

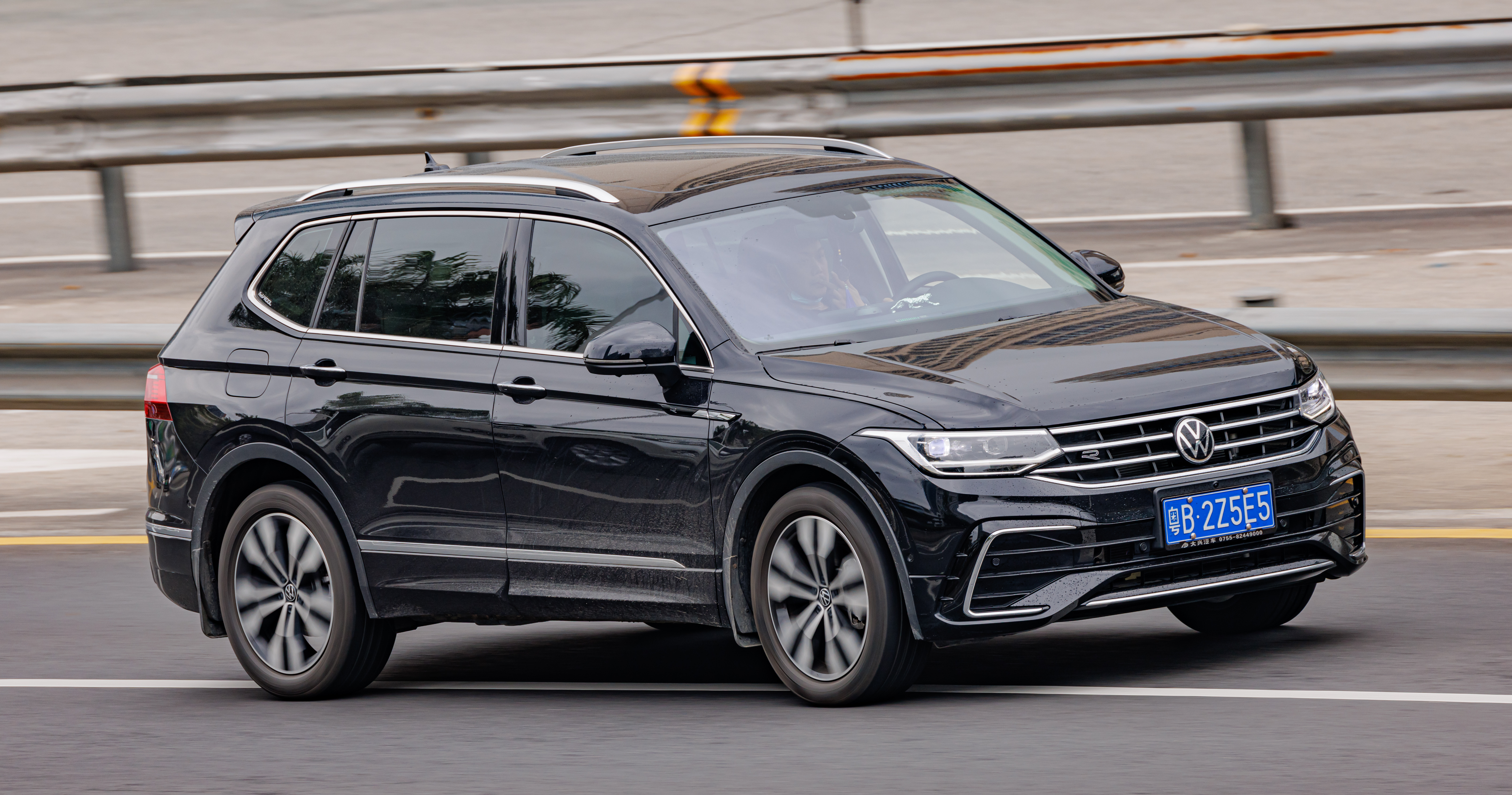
Volkswagen Tiguan L R-Line Facelift (China)

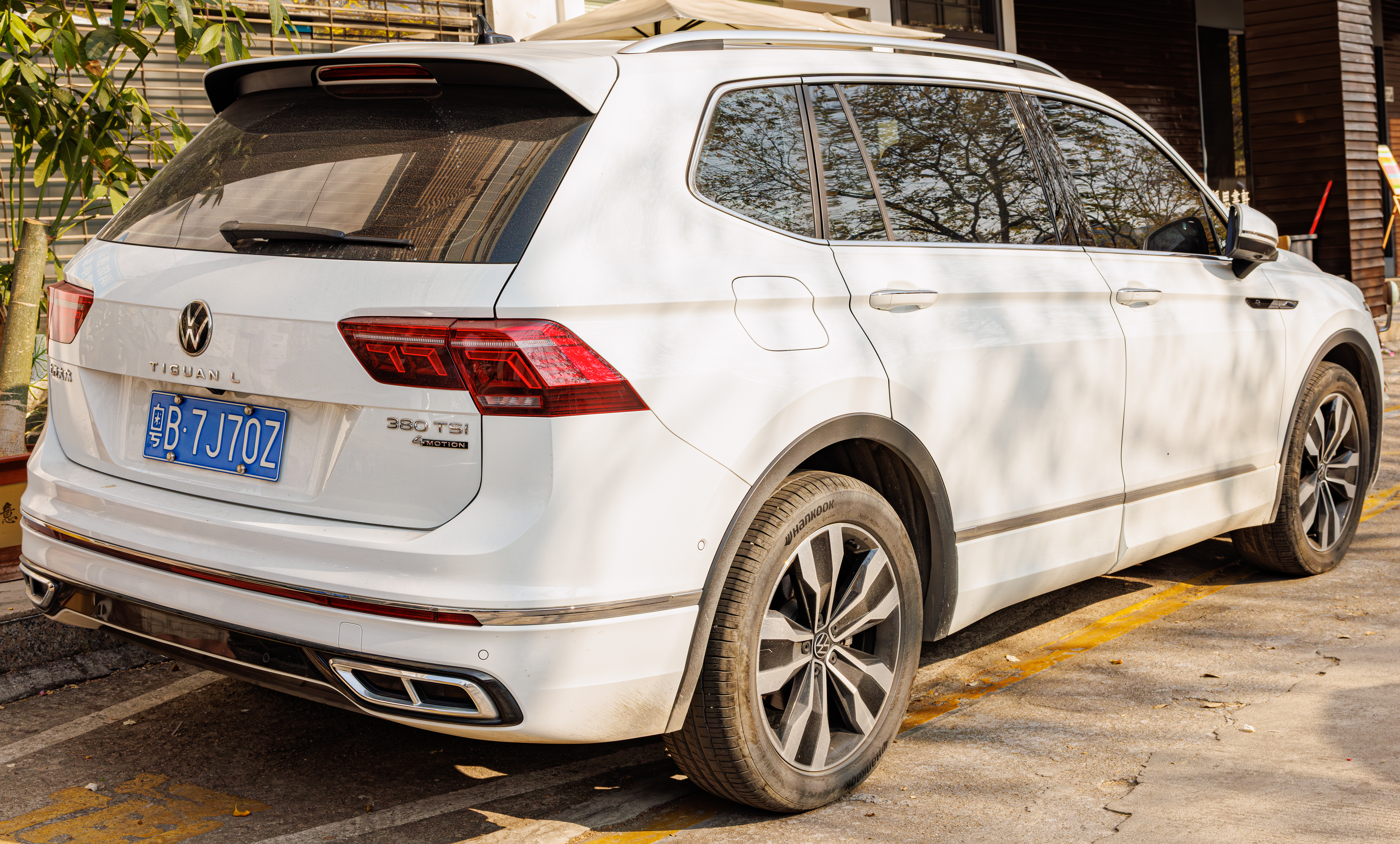
Volkswagen Tiguan L R-Line Facelift (China)

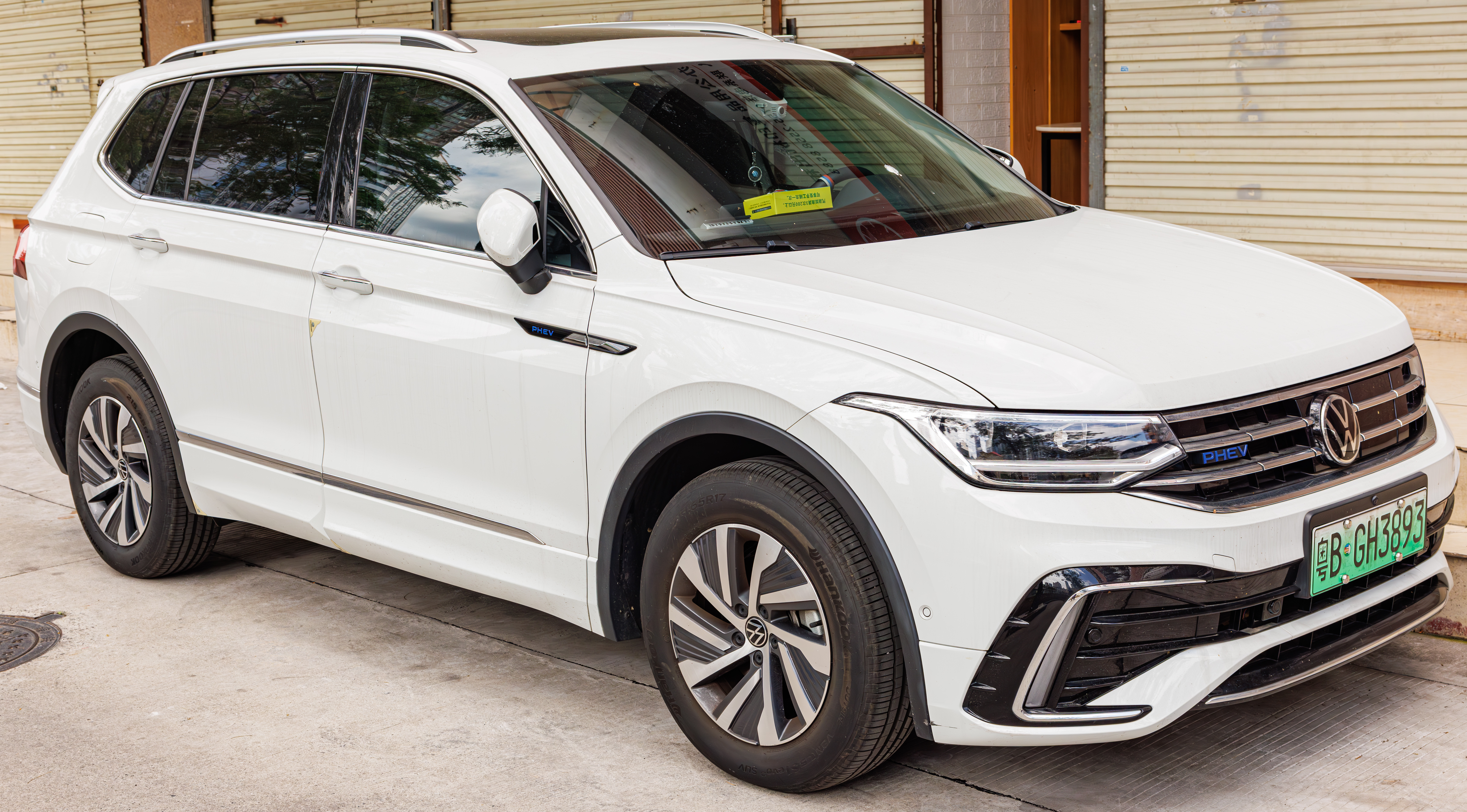
Volkswagen Tiguan L PHEV Facelift (China)

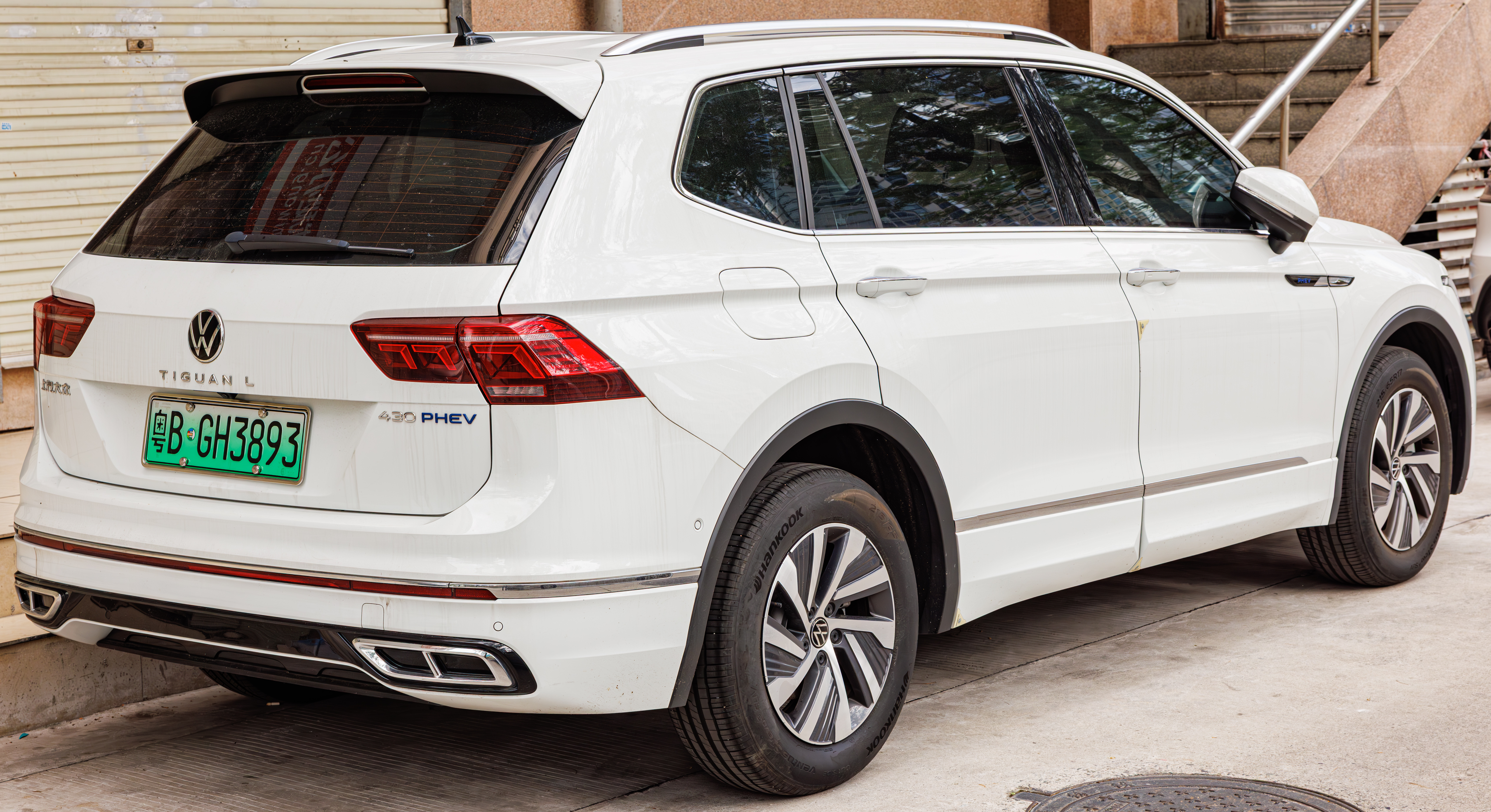
Volkswagen Tiguan L PHEV Facelift (China)

==== Australia ====
The second generation Tiguan was first announced for the Australian market in October 2015, about one month after its debut in IAA. Pricing and specifications were made available in July 2016, with the local press releasing details to the market. Sales of the Tiguan in Australia started in September 2016. At launch, it was initially offered in three trim levels: Trendline, Comfortline and Highline. The R-Line Package was also offered and it was only available on the Highline models. The Sportline trim was later added to the Australian lineup in December 2017. The LWB Tiguan Allspace was announced for Australia in April 2018, with the pricing and specifications were later revealed in June 2018. The Tiguan Allspace went on sale in Australia in July 2018 and it was available in two trim levels: Comfortline and Highline. Like the SWB model, the R-Line Package was also offered for the LWB model. The Trendline model on the SWB Tiguan was discontinued in August 2018.

==== India ====
The second generation Tiguan was launched in India on 24 May 2017, initially available in the SWB variant. It was available in two trim levels: Comfortline and Highline. The Indian-spec Tiguan is locally assembled at Volkswagen India's Aurangabad plant. The launch of the Tiguan in the Indian market marks Volkswagen India's return to the SUV segment, since the Touareg was discontinued there in 2013. The LWB Tiguan Allspace was showcased at the Auto Expo 2020 and was launched to the Indian market in March 2020. The facelift Tiguan was launched in India on 7 December 2021.

==== Malaysia ====
The second generation Volkswagen Tiguan was launched in Malaysia on 5 April 2017, only the SWB variant was available there. It was offered with two trim levels: Comfortline and Highline. The Malaysian-spec Tiguan is locally assembled at HICOM Automotive's plant in Pekan, front-wheel drive only and powered by a 1.4-litre TSI engine. In 2020, Volkswagen launched the LWB variant of the Tiguan in Malaysia. The LWB variant of the Tiguan will be sold as the Tiguan Allspace in Malaysia. It will be sold alongside the SWB variant. Initially, the LWB version will be imported from Mexico as HICOM Automotive only produces the SWB variant of the Tiguan. However, the LWB model for the Malaysian market later became locally assembled from complete knock-down kits. The Tiguan Allspace will be available in two trim levels: Highline and R-Line 4Motion. The Tiguan Allspace Highline will be powered by a 1.4-litre TSI engine while the Tiguan Allspace R-Line 4Motion is powered by a 2.0-litre TSI engine.

==== Indonesia ====
The second generation Tiguan was first launched in Indonesia at the 25th Gaikindo Indonesia International Auto Show in August 2017 as a SWB variant, under Volkswagen's distributor and assembler for the Indonesian market, Garuda Mataram Motor. The Tiguan Allspace was launched in July 2019, replacing the SWB variant. It is now locally assembled at GMM's plant in Purwakarta, West Java as a medium knock down (MKD) unit to avoid large import tax. It is powered by the same 1.4-litre TSI engine from the previous version and it is only available in one trim level.

==== Special trim levels and limited editions ====
Through to its production, the Tiguan have received various special trim levels and limited edition models in some markets.

In Australia, Volkswagen Australia has launched two limited edition models for the Tiguan exclusively for the Australian market in each respectively dates, the first being the Wolfsburg Edition, available on the SWB model in November 2018, with a limited up to 500 units. The second being the R-Line, available also on the SWB model in April 2019, with only 1000 units being sold.

At the 2018 Moscow International Automobile Salon, Volkswagen unveiled the Tiguan Offroad for the European market, it features a characteristic off-road exterior design, compared to the normal Tiguan, including different bumper designs with skid plates, black chrome window trim strips, black roof rails and side mirror covers, and a special "OFFROAD" badge located on the B-pillar. For the interior, it features comfortable front seats with the centre storage compartment wrapped in fabric leather, black headliner, multifunction steering wheel, gear knob wrapped in leather, aluminum trim, stainless steel pedals and rubber floor mats. It was available in six different colours, with a two-tone combination look with a black roof as a part of the optional Offroad Plus package and a standard 18-inch "Sebring" alloy wheels with three alternative wheel options available. The Tiguan Offroad was offered in various range of diesel and petrol engines, it is mated by a 7-speed DSG transmission as standard, along with 4Motion all-wheel drive featuring Active Control system, which can be switched between three driving modes: Onroad, Offroad and Snow.

In Mexico, a special exclusive limited-edition model for the Mexican-spec Tiguan was launched there on 15 October 2019. It is based on the Comfortline model.

=== Powertrain ===
==== Europe ====
Model	Series	Displacement	Power	Torque	Transmission	Year	
Model	Series	Displacement	Power	Torque	Transmission	Tiguan	Tiguan Allspace
Petrol engines
1.4 TSI 125	EA211	1,395 cc I4	125 PS (92 kW; 123 hp)	200 N⋅m (148 lb⋅ft)	6-speed manual	2016–2018	-
1.4 TSI 150	EA211	1,395 cc I4	150 PS (110 kW; 148 hp)	250 N⋅m (184 lb⋅ft)	6-speed manual or 6-speed DSG	2016–2018	2017–2018
1.5 TSI 130	EA211 evo	1,498 cc I4	130 PS (96 kW; 128 hp)	220 N⋅m (162 lb⋅ft)	6-speed manual	2019–present	-
1.5 TSI 150	EA211 evo	1,498 cc I4	150 PS (110 kW; 148 hp)	250 N⋅m (184 lb⋅ft)	6-speed manual or 7-speed DSG	2018–present	2018–present
2.0 TSI 180 4Motion	EA888	1,984 cc I4	180 PS (132 kW; 178 hp)	320 N⋅m (236 lb⋅ft)	7-speed DSG	2016–2018	2018–present
2.0 TSI 190 4Motion	EA888	1,984 cc I4	190 PS (140 kW; 187 hp)	320 N⋅m (236 lb⋅ft)	7-speed DSG	2019–2020	-
2.0 TSI 220 4Motion	EA888	1,984 cc I4	220 PS (162 kW; 217 hp)	350 N⋅m (258 lb⋅ft)	7-speed DSG	2016–2018	2018–2020
2.0 TSI 230 4Motion	EA888	1,984 cc I4	230 PS (169 kW; 227 hp)	350 N⋅m (258 lb⋅ft)	7-speed DSG	2019–2020	-
2.0 TSI 245 4Motion	EA888	1,984 cc I4	245 PS (180 kW; 243 hp)	370 N-m (273 lb-ft)	7-speed DSG	2020–2024	2020–2024
2.0 TSI 320 4Motion (Tiguan R)	EA888	1,984 cc I4	320 PS (235 kW; 316 hp)	420 N⋅m (310 lb⋅ft)	7-speed DSG	2020–2024	-
Diesel engines
1.6 TDI 115	EA288	1,598 cc I4	115 PS (85 kW; 113 hp)	320 N⋅m (236 lb⋅ft)	6-speed manual	2016–2020	-
2.0 TDI 150	EA288	1,968 cc I4	150 PS (110 kW; 148 hp)	340 N⋅m (251 lb⋅ft)	6-speed manual or 7-speed DSG	2016–2024	2017–2024
2.0 TDI 150 4Motion	EA288	1,968 cc I4	150 PS (110 kW; 148 hp)	340 N⋅m (251 lb⋅ft)	6-speed manual or 7-speed DSG	2016–2024	2017–2024
2.0 TDI 190 4Motion	EA288	1,968 cc I4	190 PS (140 kW; 187 hp)	400 N⋅m (295 lb⋅ft)	7-speed DSG	2016–2020	2017–2022
2.0 TDI 200 4Motion	EA288	1,968 cc I4	200 PS (147 kW; 197 hp)	400 N⋅m (295 lb⋅ft)	7 speed DSG	2021–2024	2021–2024
2.0 TDI 240 4Motion	EA288	1,968 cc I4	240 PS (177 kW; 237 hp)	500 N⋅m (369 lb⋅ft)	7-speed DSG	2016–2020	2017–2022

==== North America ====
Petrol engine
Model	Displacement	Series	Power	Torque	Transmission
2.0 TSI	1,984 cc I4	EA888	184 hp (187 PS; 137 kW)	300 N⋅m (221 lb⋅ft)	8-speed automatic
2.0 TSI 4Motion	1,984 cc I4	EA888	184 hp (187 PS; 137 kW)	300 N⋅m (221 lb⋅ft)	8-speed automatic

==== China ====
Model	Displacement	Series	Power	Torque	Transmission
Petrol engines
1.4 '280 TSI'	1,395 cc I4	EA211	150 PS (110 kW; 148 hp)	250 N⋅m (184 lb⋅ft)	6-speed DSG or 7-speed DSG
2.0 '330 TSI'	1,984 cc I4	EA888	187 PS (138 kW; 184 hp)	320 N⋅m (236 lb⋅ft)	7-speed DSG
2.0 '380 TSI' 4Motion	1,984 cc I4	EA888	220 PS (162 kW; 217 hp)	350 N⋅m (258 lb⋅ft)	7-speed DSG
Plug-in hybrid petrol engine
1.4 '430' PHEV	1,395 cc I4	EA211	150 PS (110 kW; 148 hp) (petrol engine); 75–115 PS (55–85 kW; 74–113 hp) (electric motor); 211 PS (155 kW; 208 hp) (combined output)	250 N⋅m (184 lb⋅ft) (petrol engine); 170–330 N⋅m (125–243 lb⋅ft) (electric motor); 400 N⋅m (295 lb⋅ft) (combined output)	6-speed DSG (DQ400e)

=== Safety ===
==== ANCAP ====
ANCAP test results Volkswagen Tiguan all variants including Allspace (2018, aligned with Euro NCAP)
Test	Points	%
Overall:	5 /5 stars	
Adult occupant:	36.6	96%
Child occupant:	39.4	80%
Pedestrian:	28.9	68%
Safety assist:	8.1	68%

==== Euro NCAP ====
Euro NCAP test results VW Tiguan 2.0 TDI 110 kW (LHD) (2016)
Test	Points	%
Overall:	5 /5 stars	
Adult occupant:	36.7	96%
Child occupant:	41.5	84%
Pedestrian:	30.6	72%
Safety assist:	8.2	68%

==== Latin NCAP ====
In its most basic Latin American market configuration with 6 airbags and ESC, it received 5 stars for adult occupants, 5 stars for infants and Advanced Award from Latin NCAP 2.0 in 2019.

Latin NCAP 2.0 test results Volkswagen Tiguan + 6 Airbags (2019, based on Euro NCAP 2008)
Test	Points	Stars
Adult occupant:	31.94/34.0	5 /5 stars
Child occupant:	44.00/49.00	5 /5 stars

Latin NCAP 3.0 test results 203/volkswagen-new-tiguan-+-6-airbags (2021, similar to Euro NCAP 2014)
Test	Points	%
Overall:	5 /5 stars	
Adult occupant:	34.32	86%
Child occupant:	39.67	81%
Pedestrian:	38.25	80%
Safety assist:	39.63	92%

==== IIHS ====
The 2022 Tiguan was tested by the IIHS and earned a Top Safety Pick+ award:

IIHS scores
Small overlap front (Driver)	Good
Small overlap front (Passenger)	Good
Moderate overlap front	Good
Side	Good
Roof strength	Good
Head restraints and seats	Good
Headlights	Acceptable
Front crash prevention (Vehicle-to-Vehicle)	Superior
Front crash prevention (Vehicle-to-Pedestrian, day)	Advanced
Front crash prevention (Vehicle-to-Pedestrian, night)	Basic
Child seat anchors (LATCH) ease of use	Acceptable

== Third generation (CT1; 2024) ==
Third generation
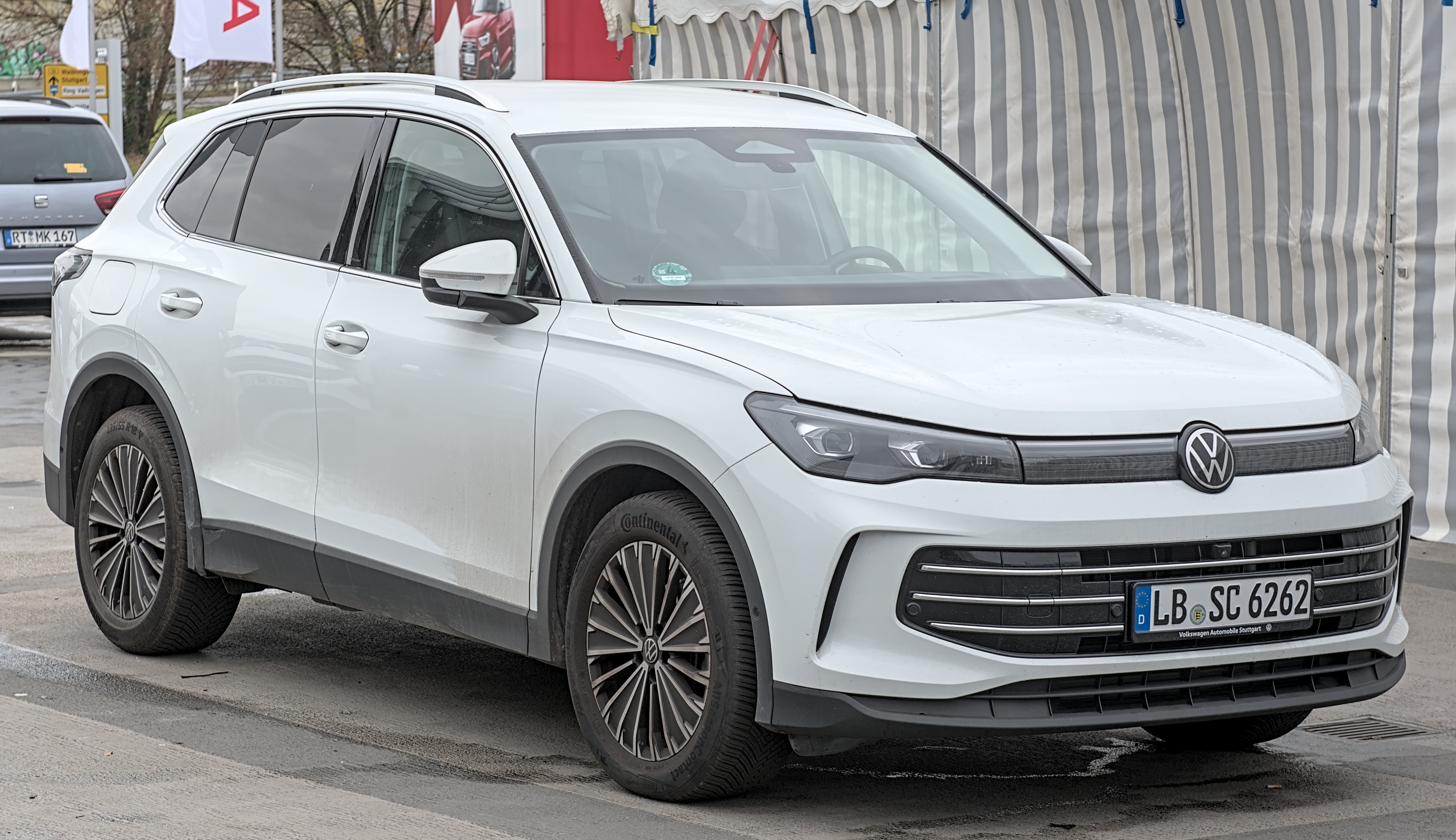

Overview
- Model code: CT1
- Production: 2024–present
- Assembly: Germany: Wolfsburg (Wolfsburg Volkswagen Plant); China: Anting (SAIC-VW, L only)

Body and chassis
- Body style: 5-door SUV
- Layout: Front-engine, front-wheel-drive Front-engine, all-wheel-drive (4motion)
- Platform: Volkswagen Group MQB Evo
- Related: Volkswagen Tayron Mk2; Volkswagen Passat (B9); Škoda Superb Mk4; Škoda Kodiaq Mk2; Audi Q3 MK3

Powertrain
- Engine: Petrol: 1.4 L TSI turbo I4; 1.5 L TSI mild hybrid turbo I4; 2.0 L TSI turbo I4; Petrol plug-in hybrid: 1.5 L TSI turbo I4 (eHybrid); Diesel: 2.0 L TDI I4
- Transmission: 6-speed DSG (Tiguan eHybrid); 7-speed DSG; 8 speed automatic (North America)

Dimensions
- Wheelbase: 2,681 mm (105.6 in); 2,791 mm (109.9 in) (China and USA)
- Length: 4,551 mm (179.2 in); 4,683 mm (184.4 in) (USA); 4,735 mm (186.4 in) (China); 4,744 mm (186.8 in) (Tiguan L ePro)
- Width: 1,842 mm (72.5 in); 1,859 mm (73.2 in) (China and USA)
- Height: 1,640 mm (64.6 in); 1,682–1,684 mm (66.2–66.3 in) (China and USA)

On 14 June 2023, Volkswagen unveiled a prototype of the third-generation Tiguan, which was officially launched in 2024. The production version was officially presented on 19 September 2023.

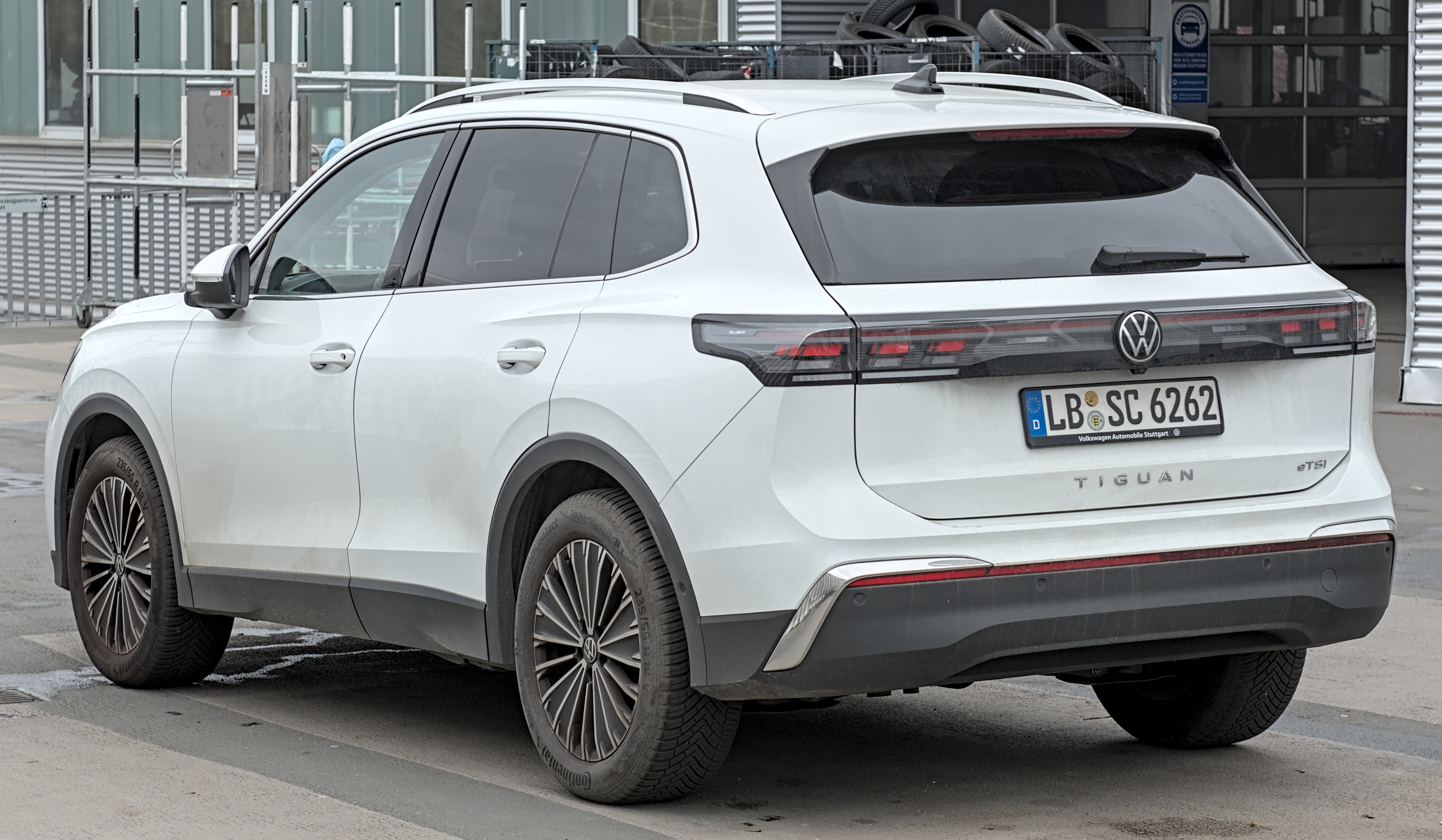
Rear view

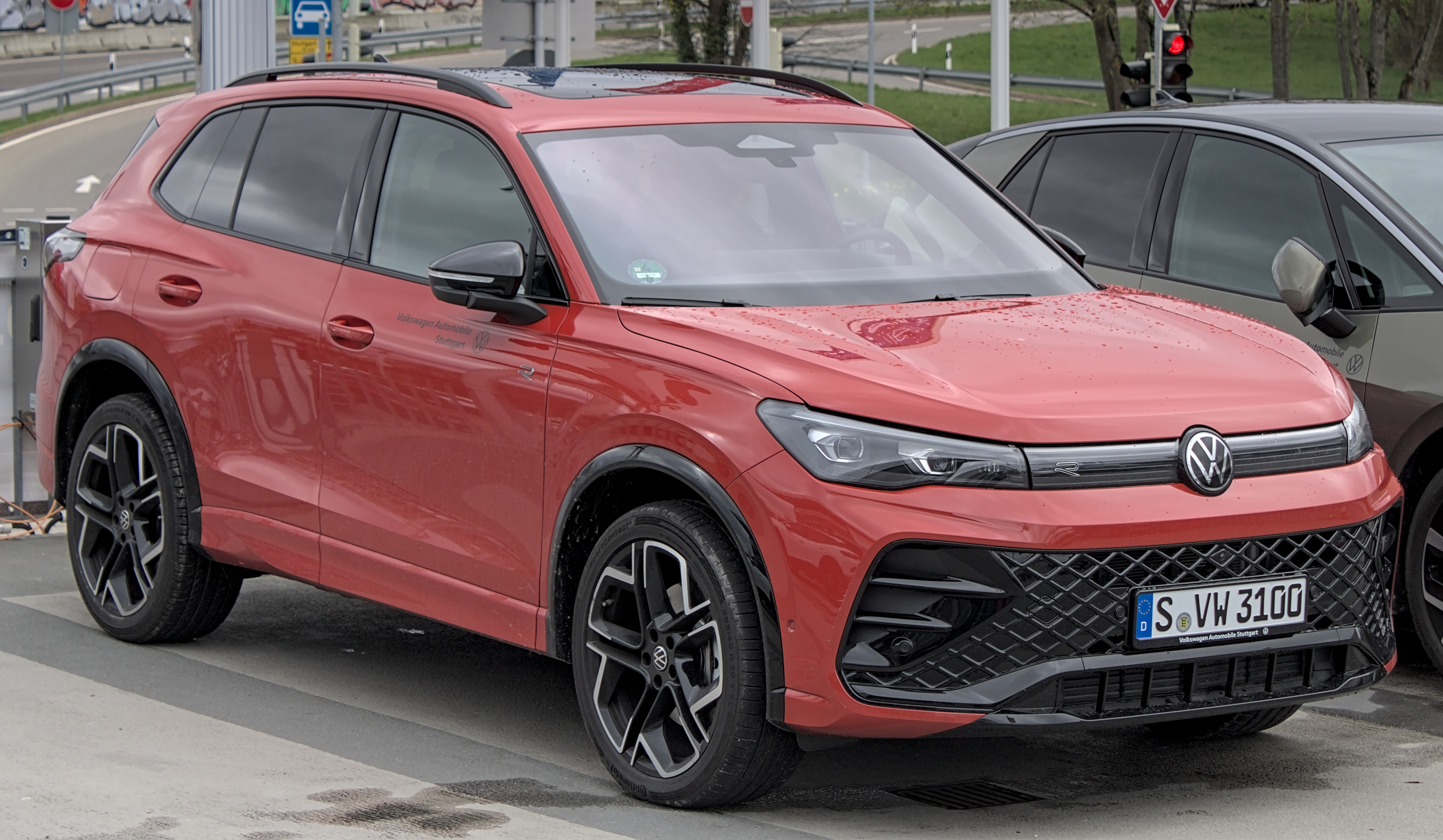
Tiguan R-Line

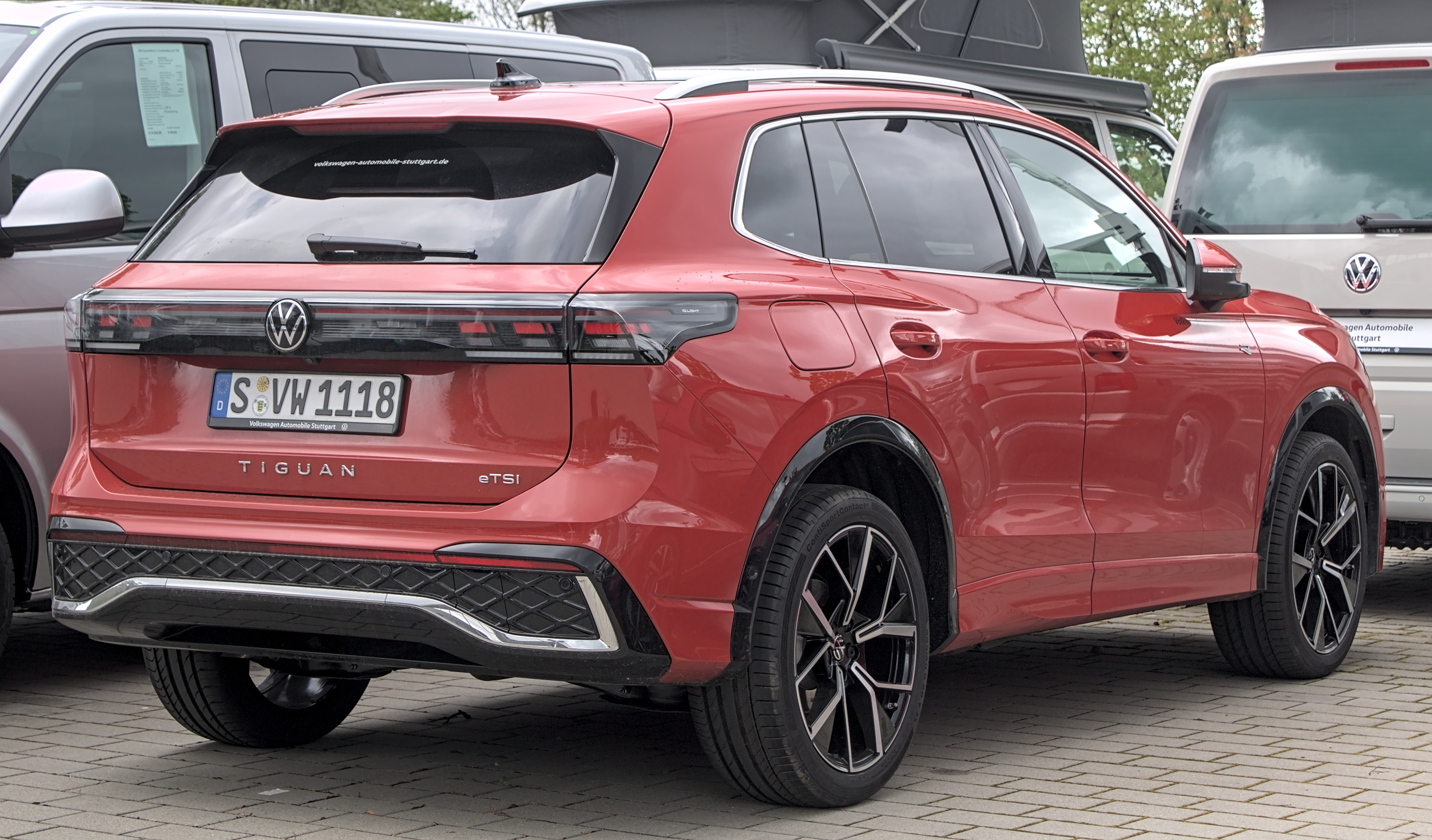
Tiguan R-Line rear view

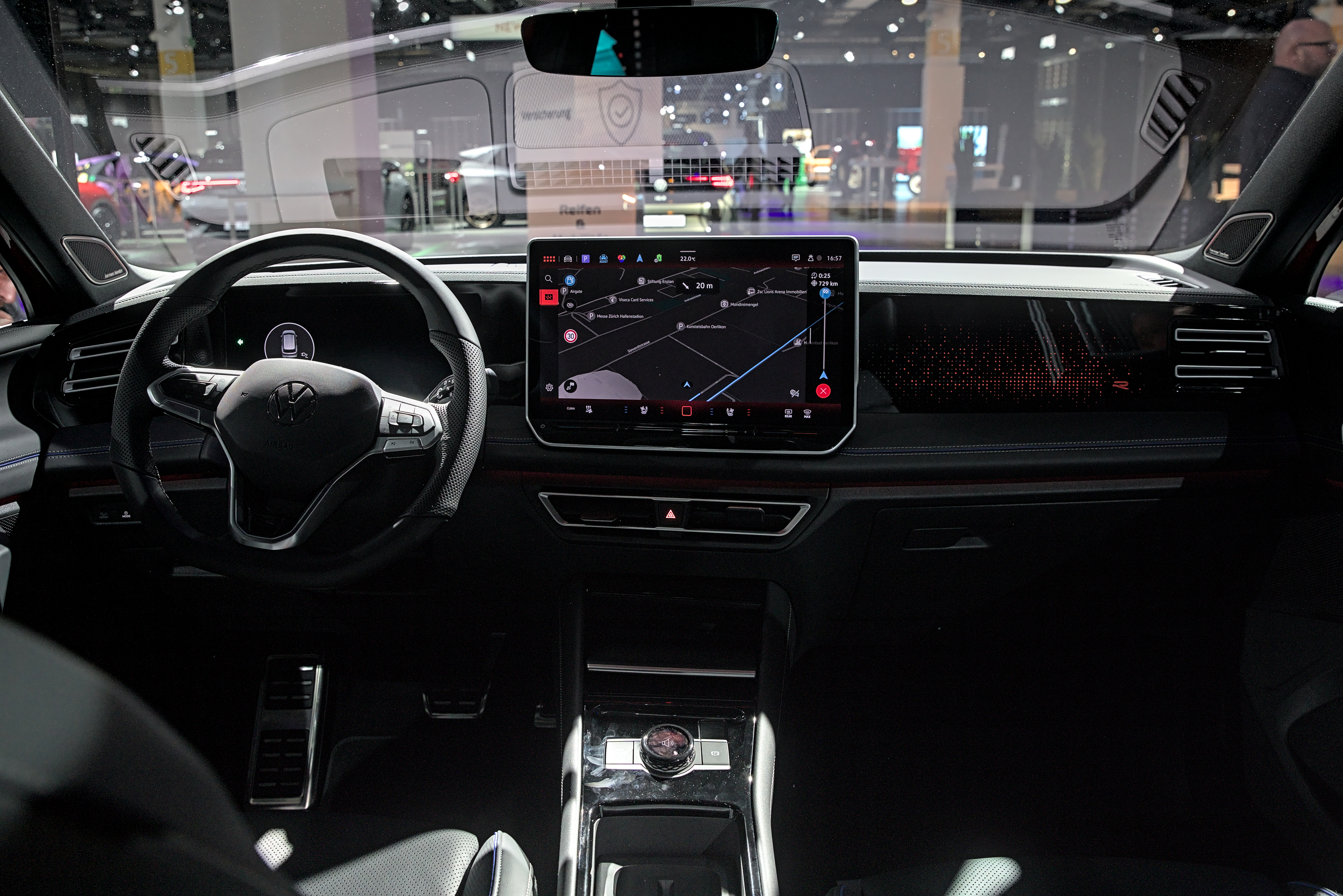
Interior

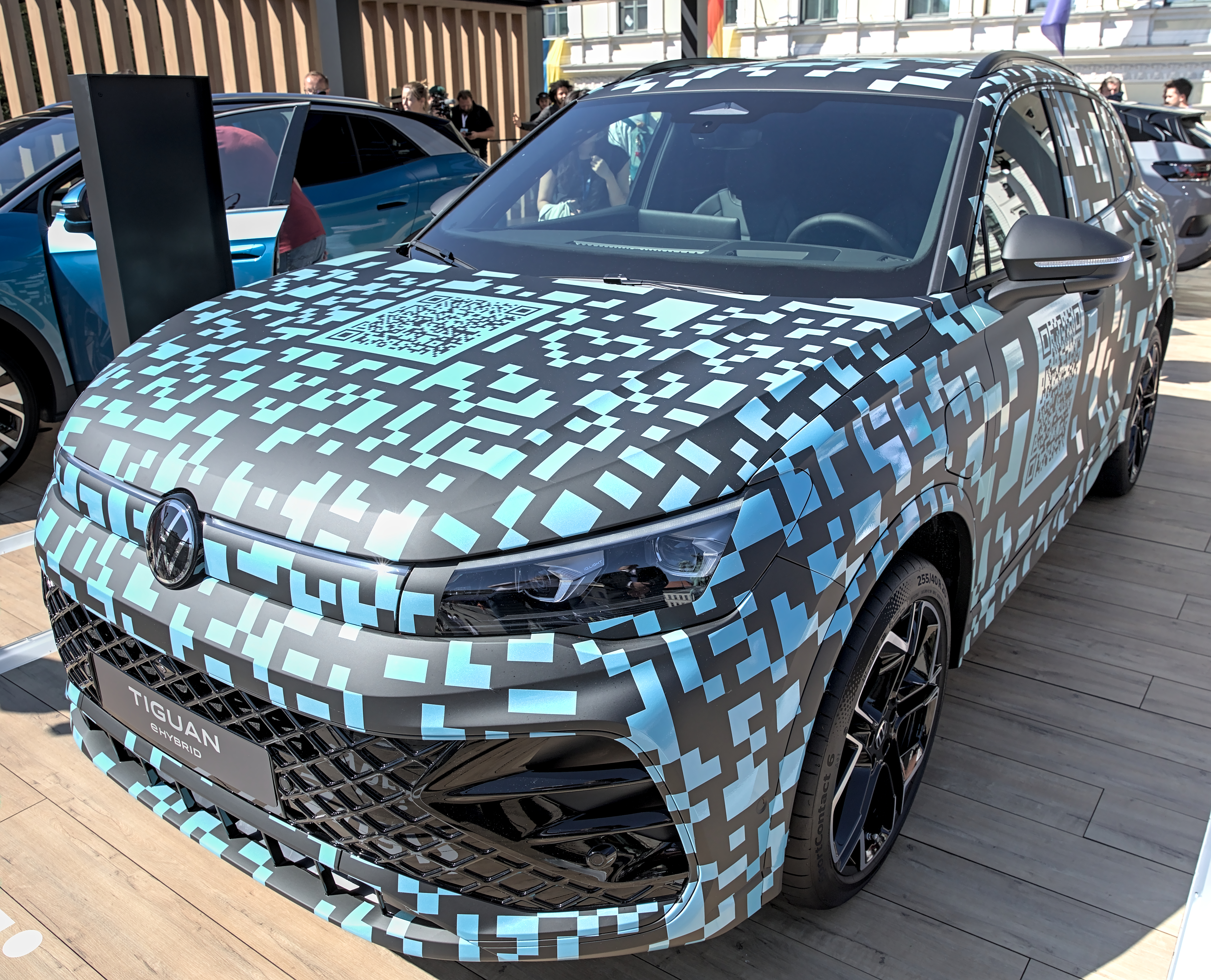
Tiguan prototype at 2023 Munich Motor Show

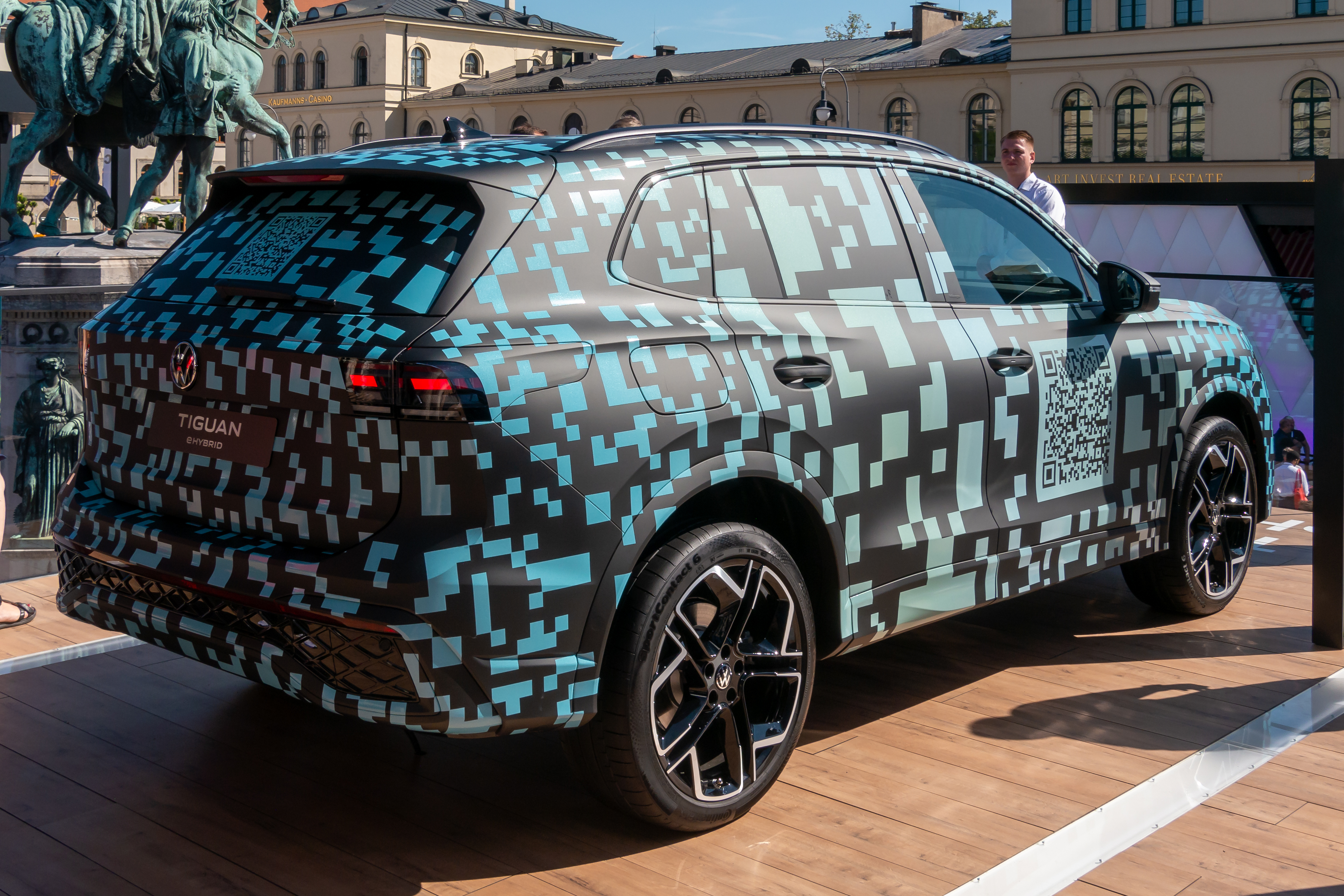
Tiguan prototype rear

=== Markets ===
==== China ====
The third-generation Tiguan is marketed as the Tiguan L Pro in China. Compared to the global model, the Tiguan L Pro has a longer wheelbase and body length. It is sold alongside the previous generation Tiguan L.

The MIIT released photos of the Tiguan L ePro on February 6, 2026. On February 7, Volkswagen unveiled exterior images of the vehicle online the same day. For powertrains, the Tiguan L PRO comes standard with the 1.5-litre mild hybrid turbocharged four cylinder unit for the 300TSI and the 2.0-litre turbocharged four cylinder for the Tiguan R-Line. Both options are paired to the 7 speed DSG as standard.

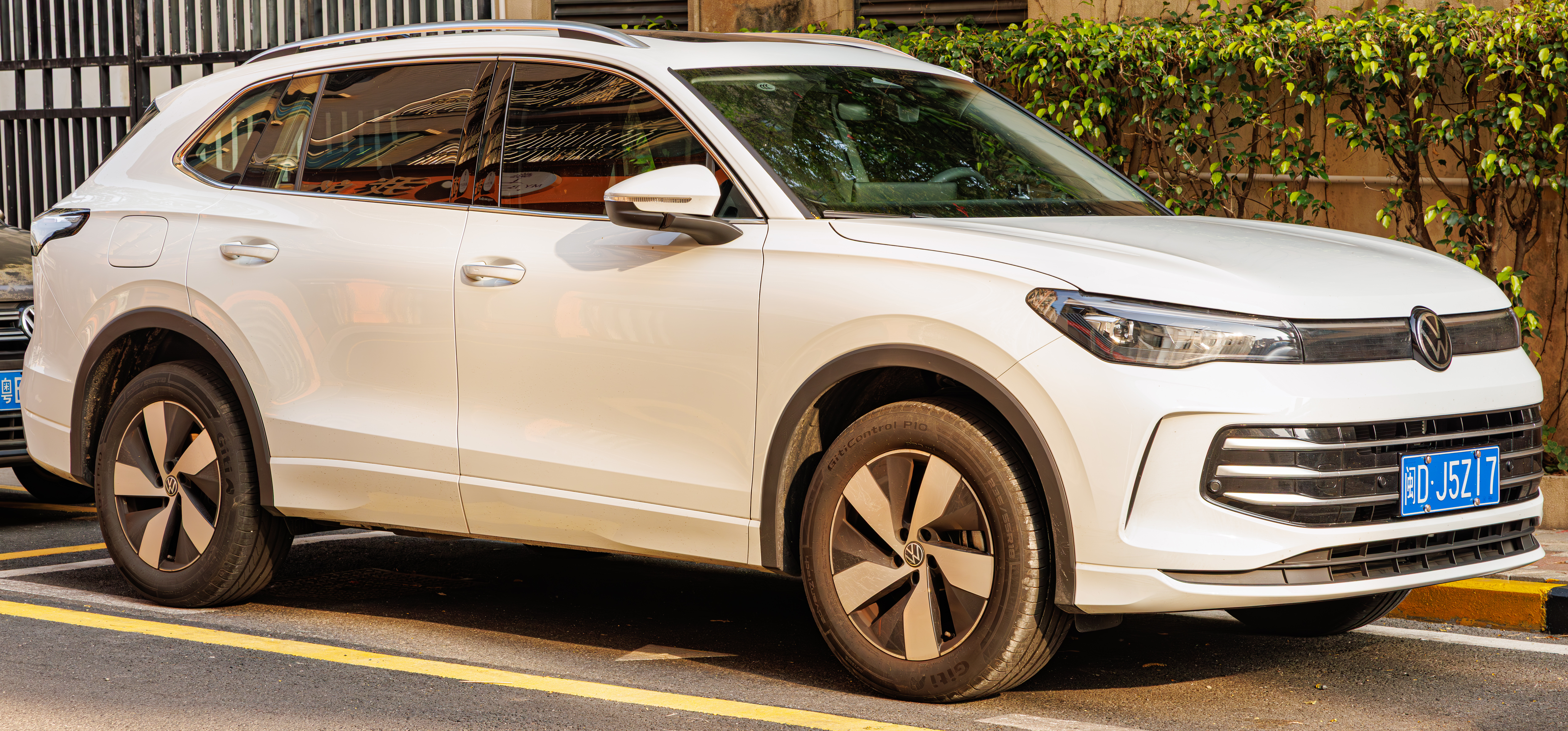
Volkswagen Tiguan L Pro

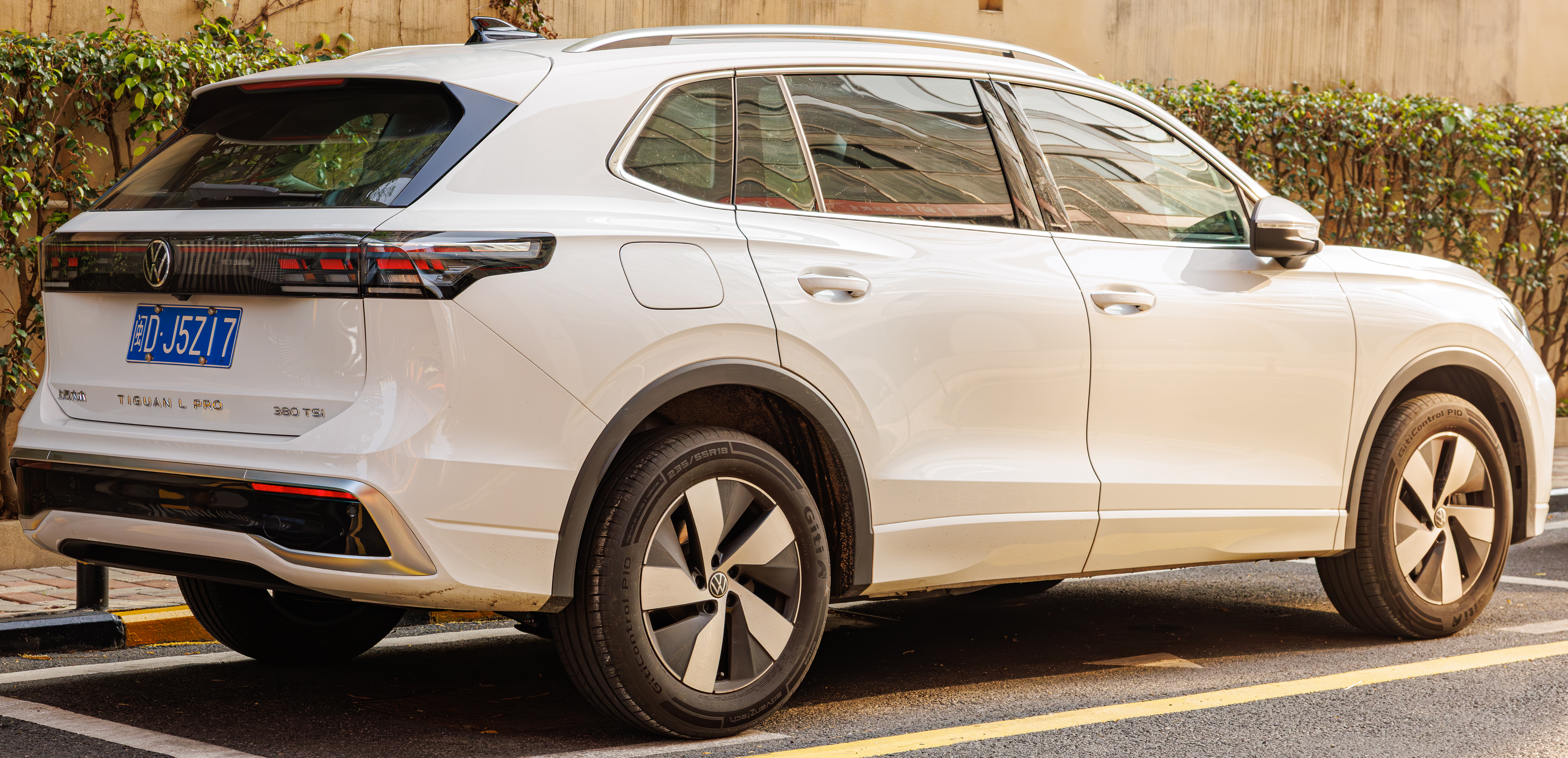
Rear view

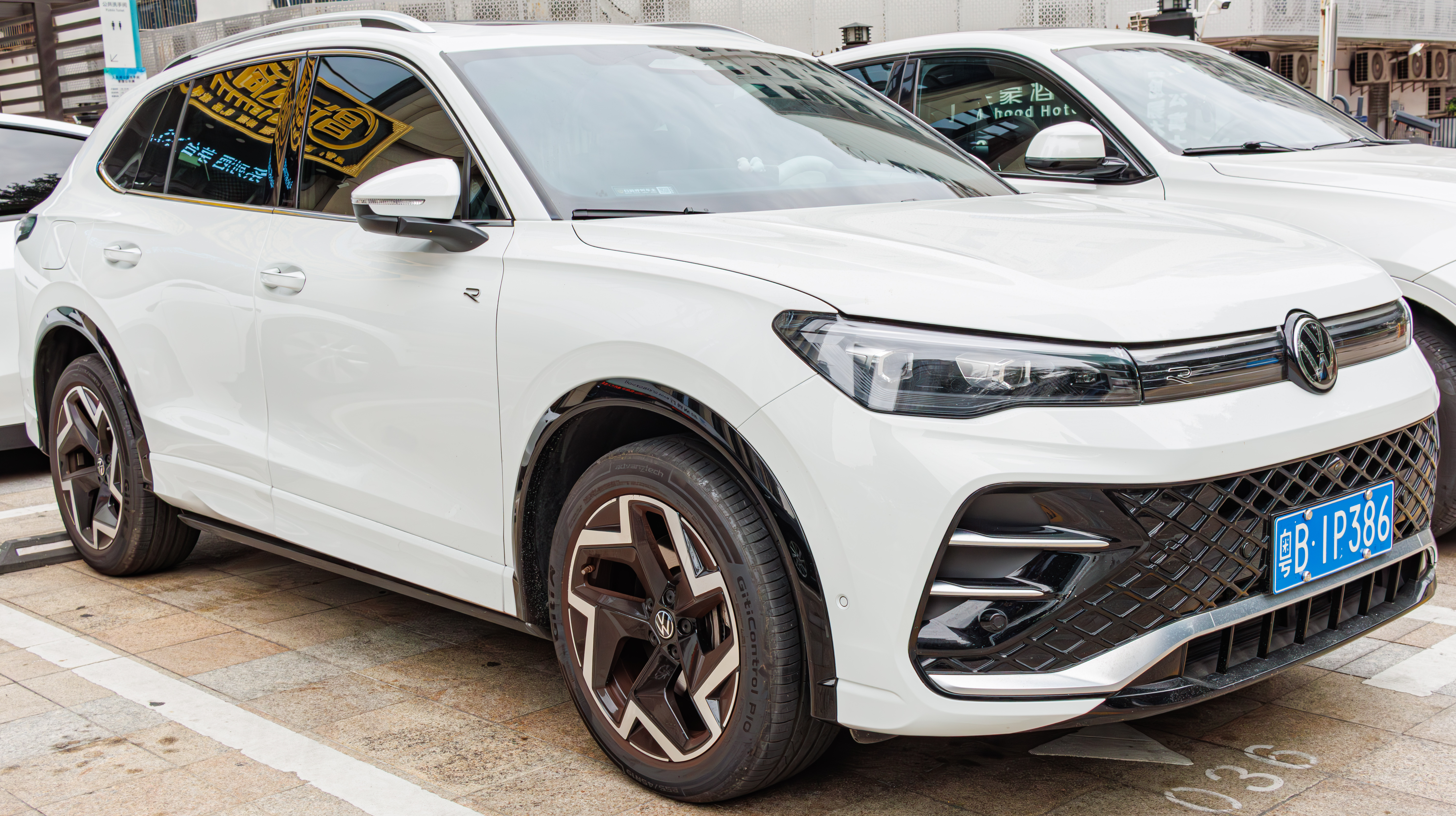
Volkswagen Tiguan L Pro (R-Line)

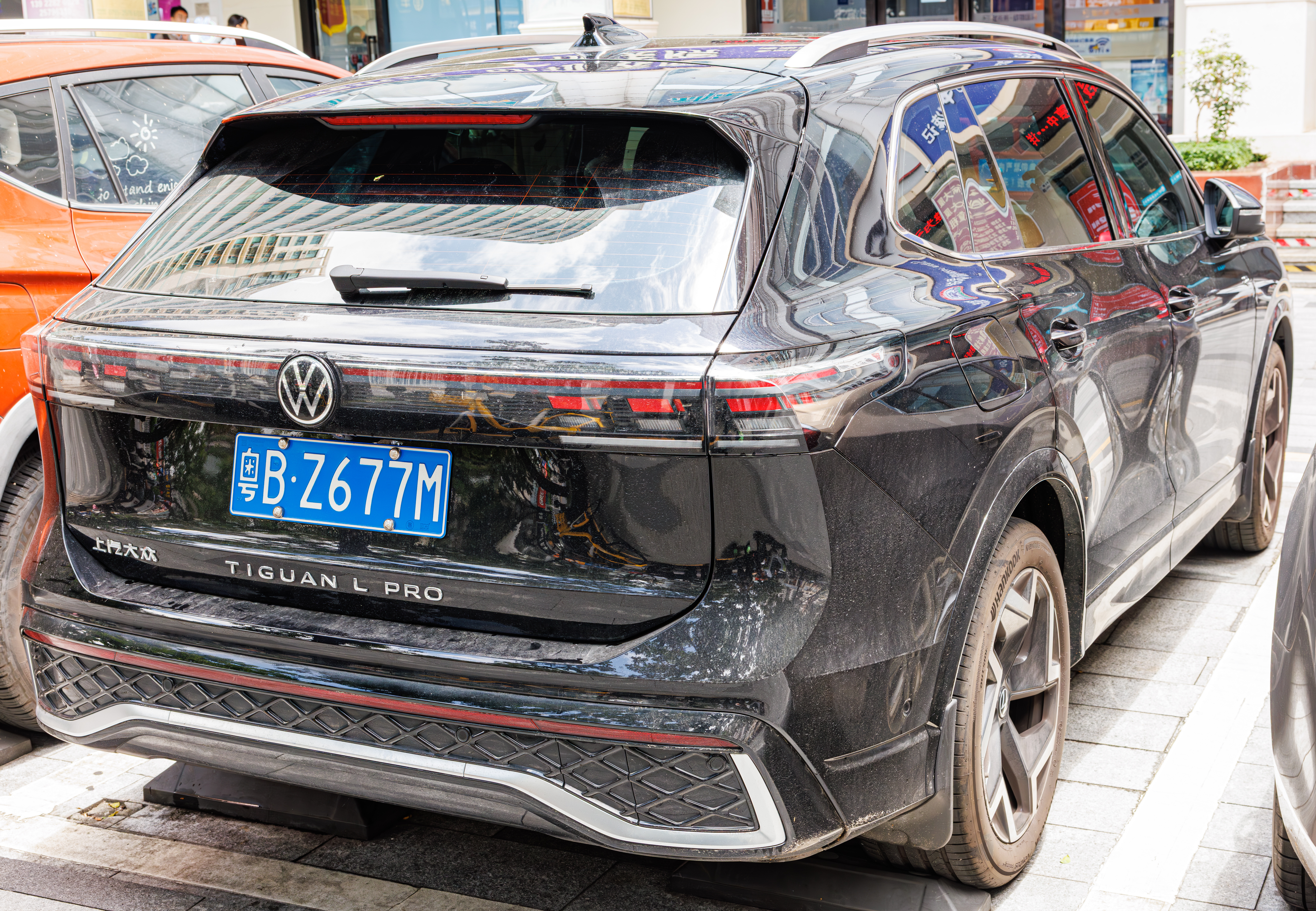
Rear view (R-Line)

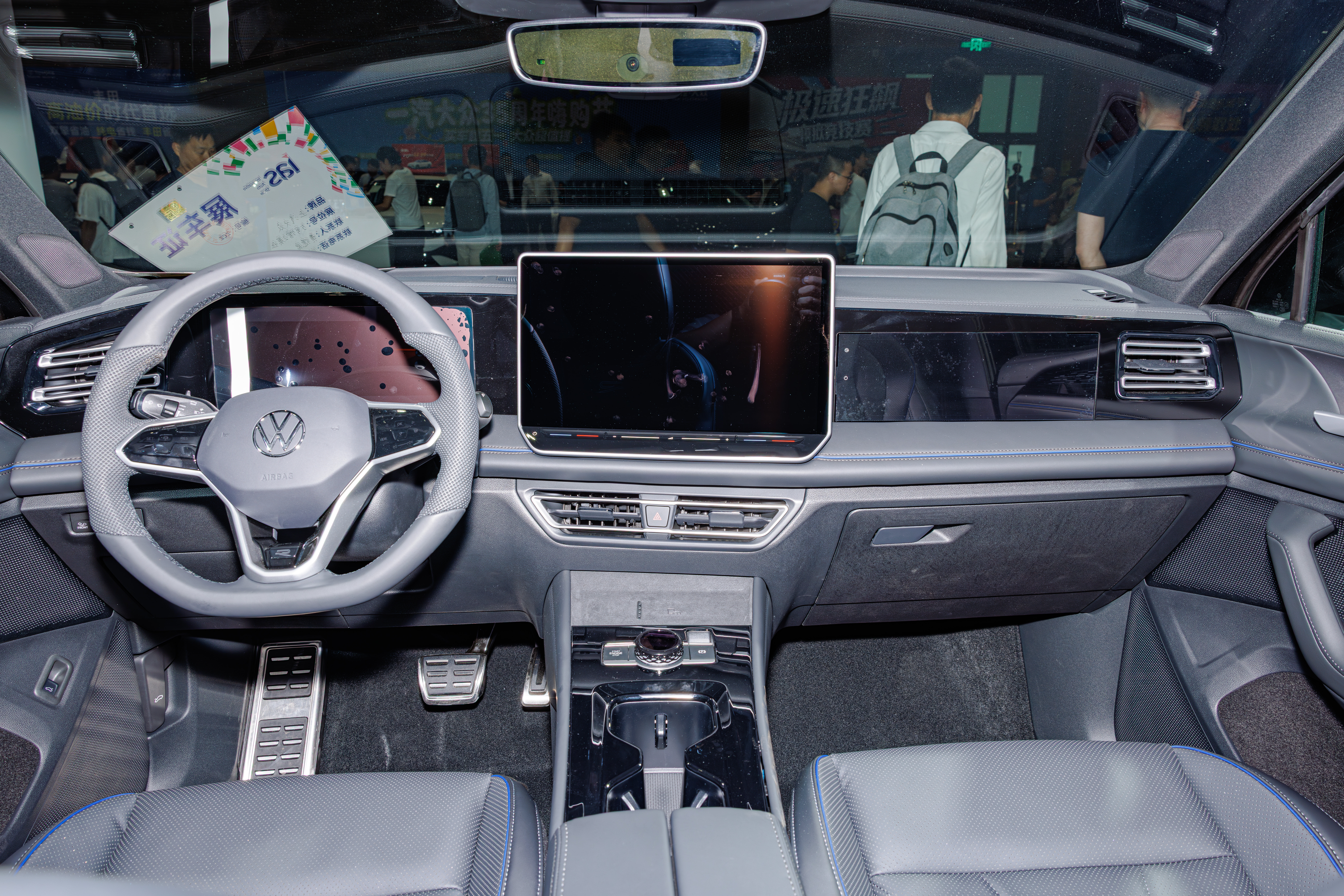
Interior

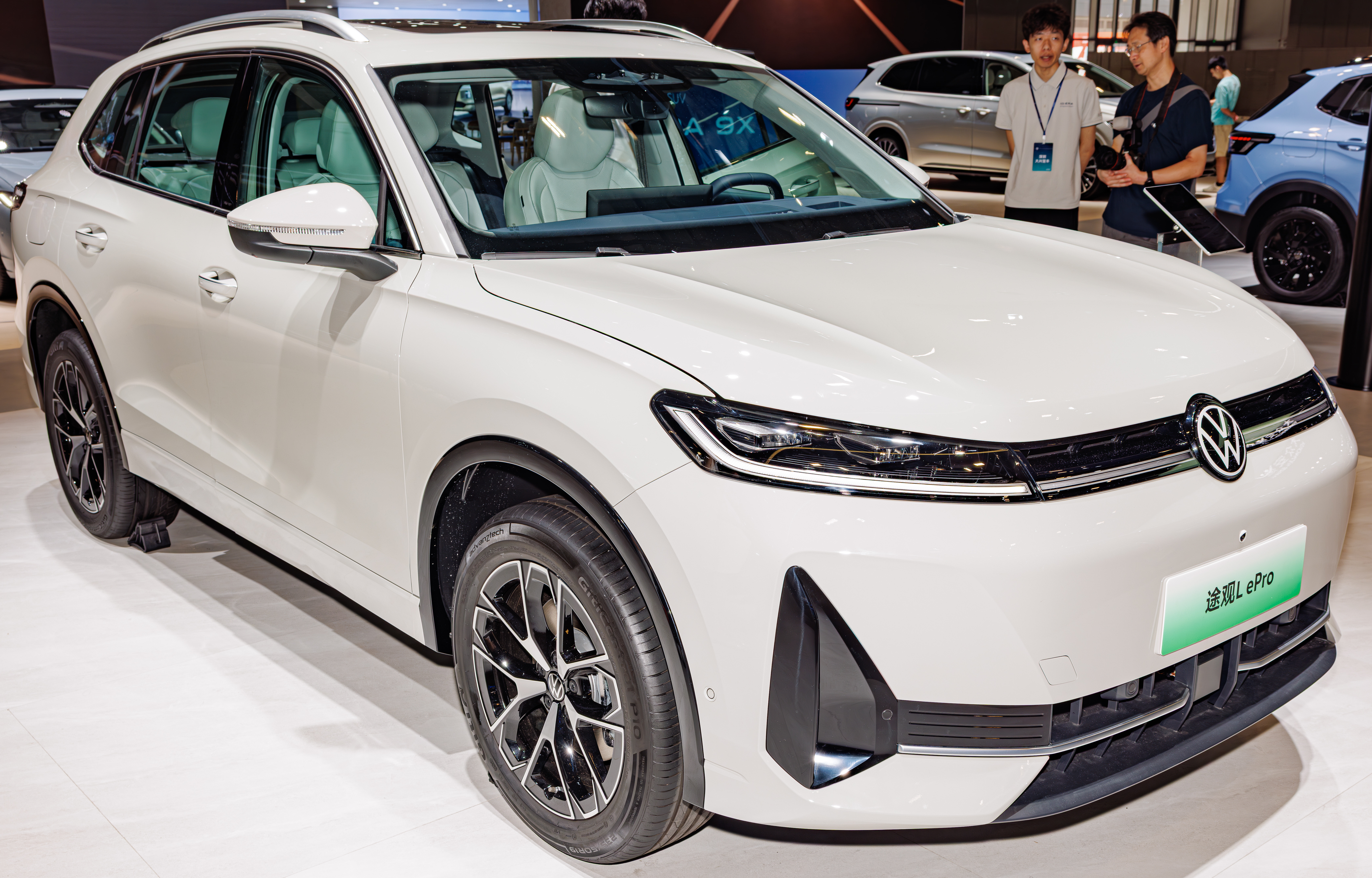
Volkswagen Tiguan L ePro

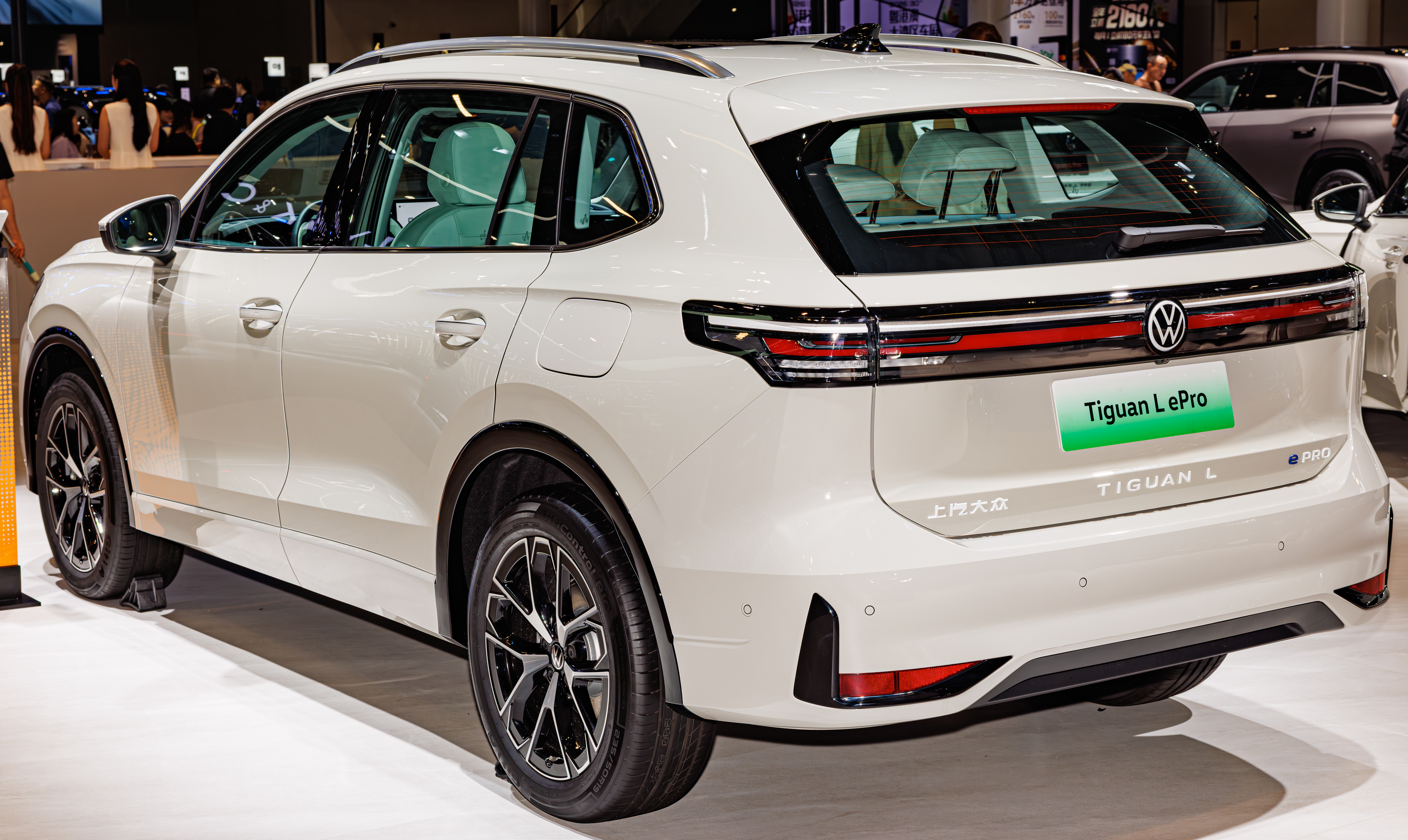
Rear view

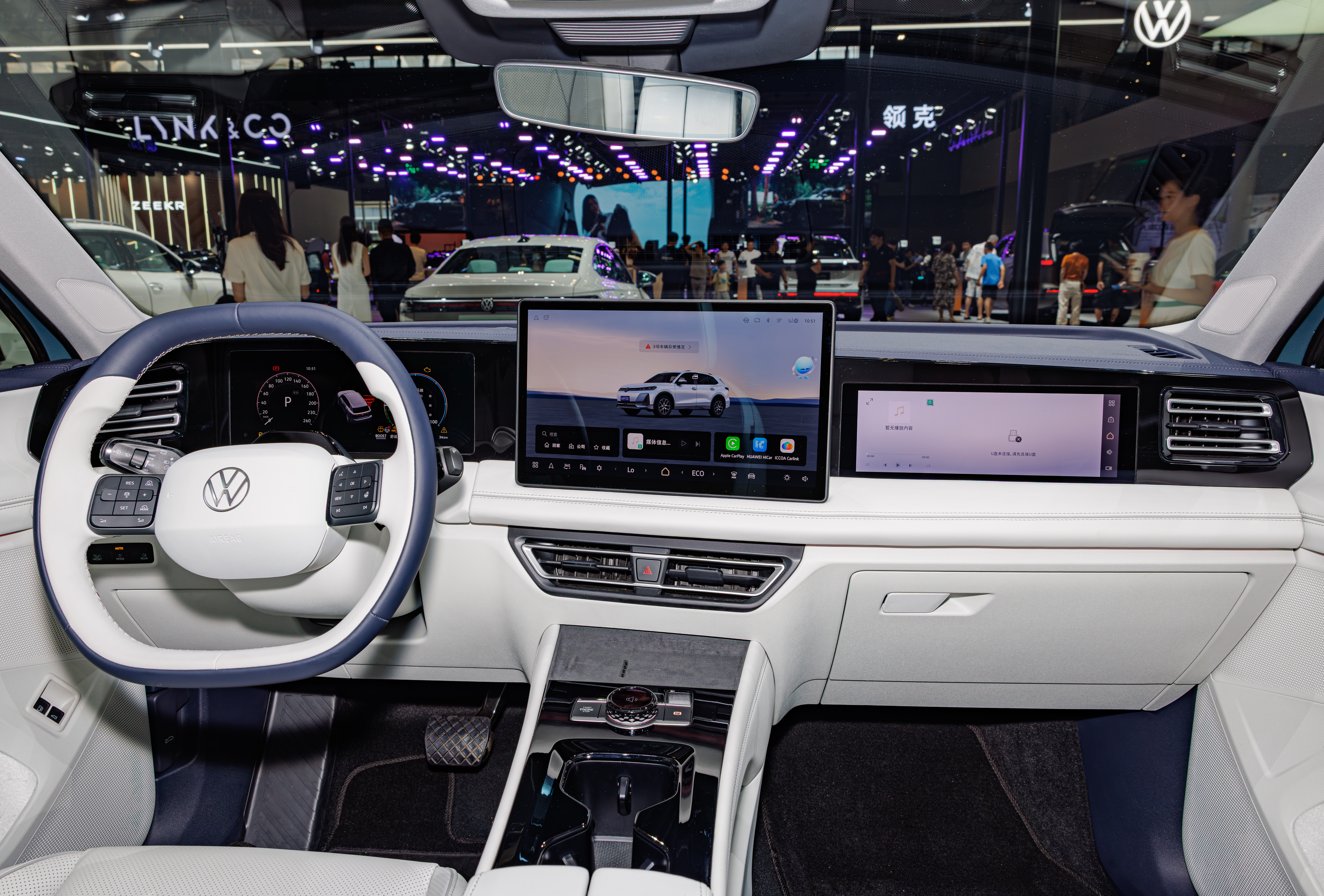
Interior (Tiguan L ePro)

==== North America ====
In North America, the third-generation Tiguan is nearly identical to the Chinese market Volkswagen Tayron L, rather than the European-market Tiguan. The Tayron shares the same MQB Evo platform as the Tiguan. Unlike the previous model, the third-generation Tiguan for North America is only available with two-row seating.

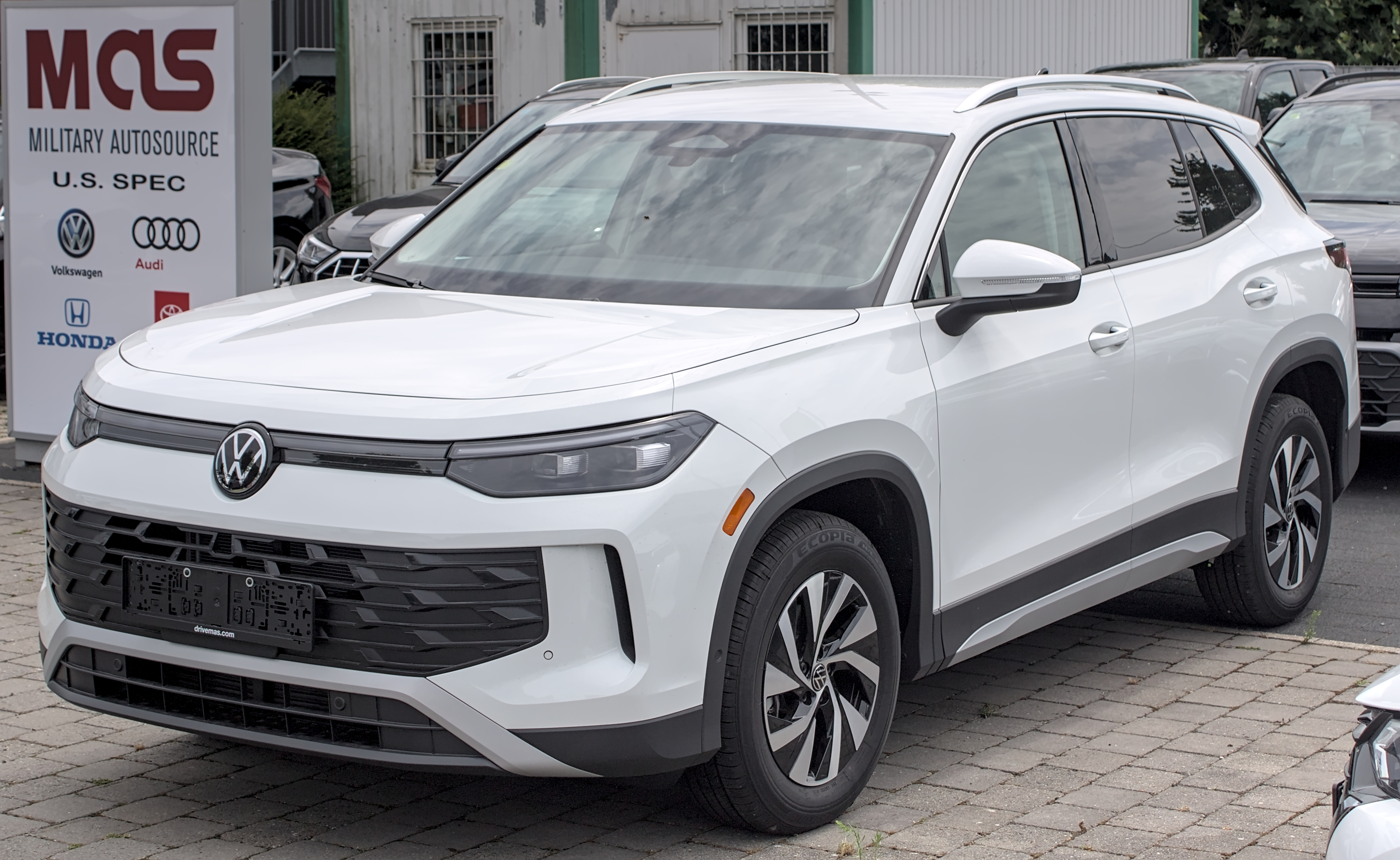
2025 Volkswagen Tiguan (North America)

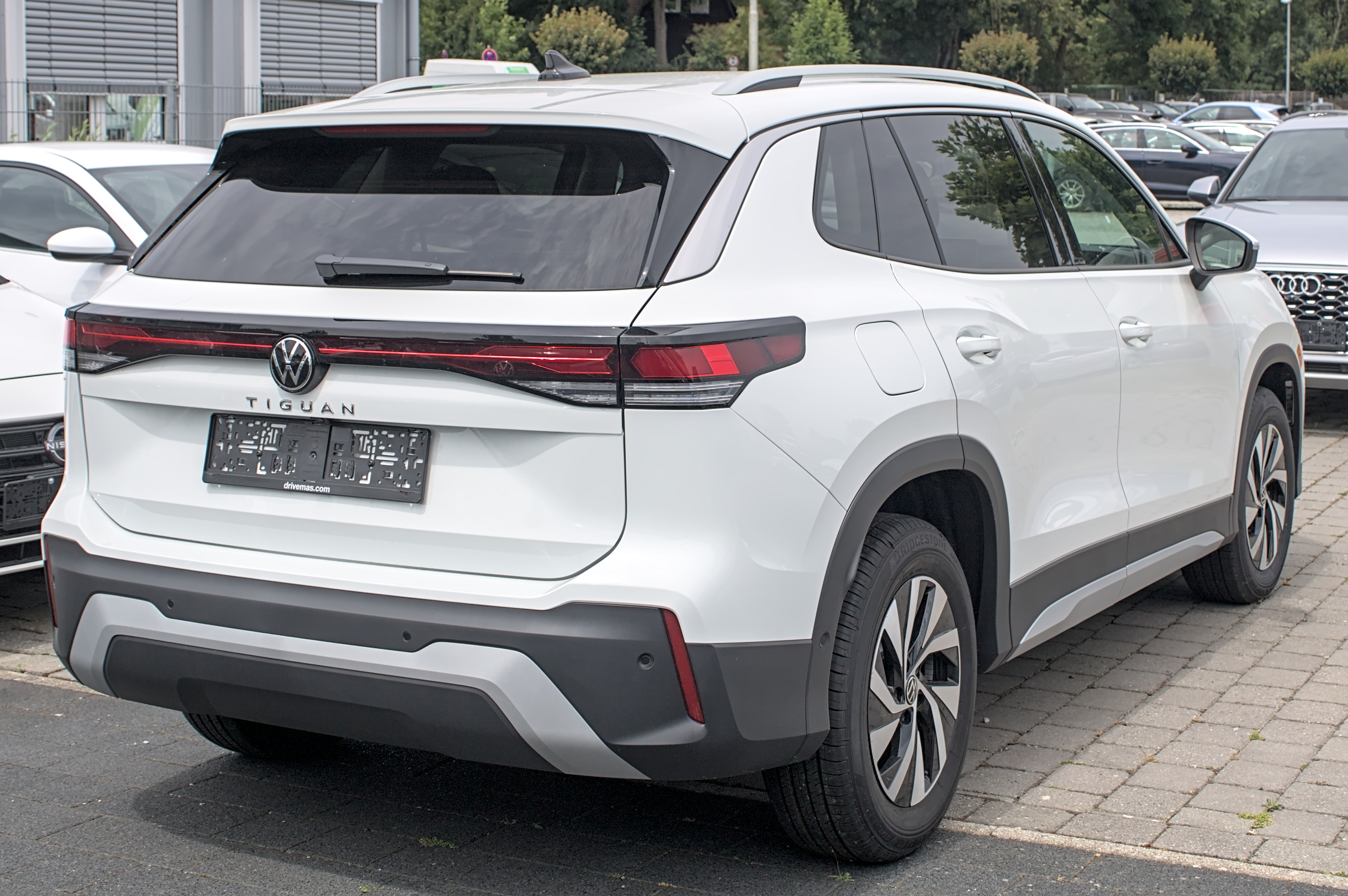
Rear view

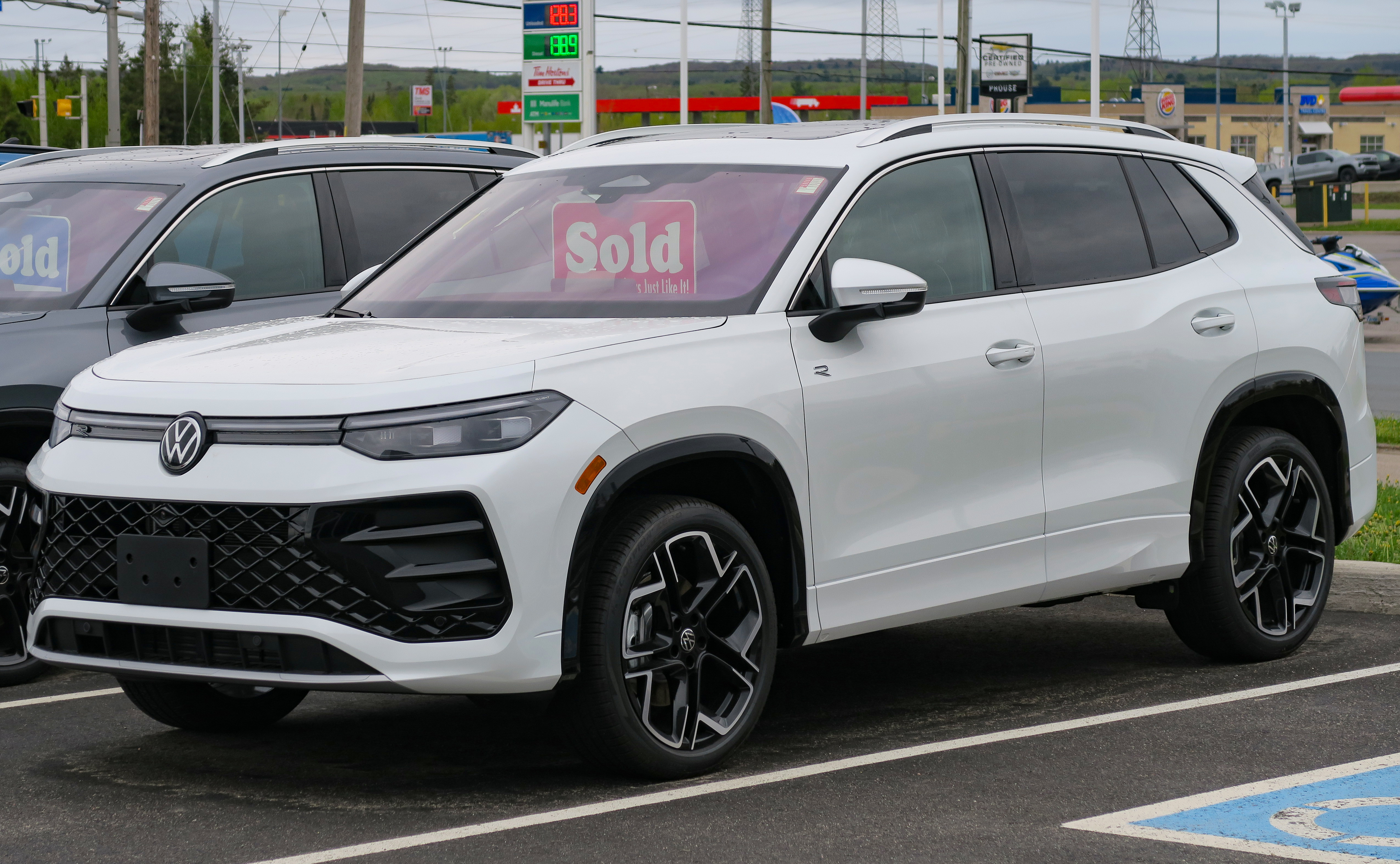
2025 Volkswagen Tiguan R-Line (North America)

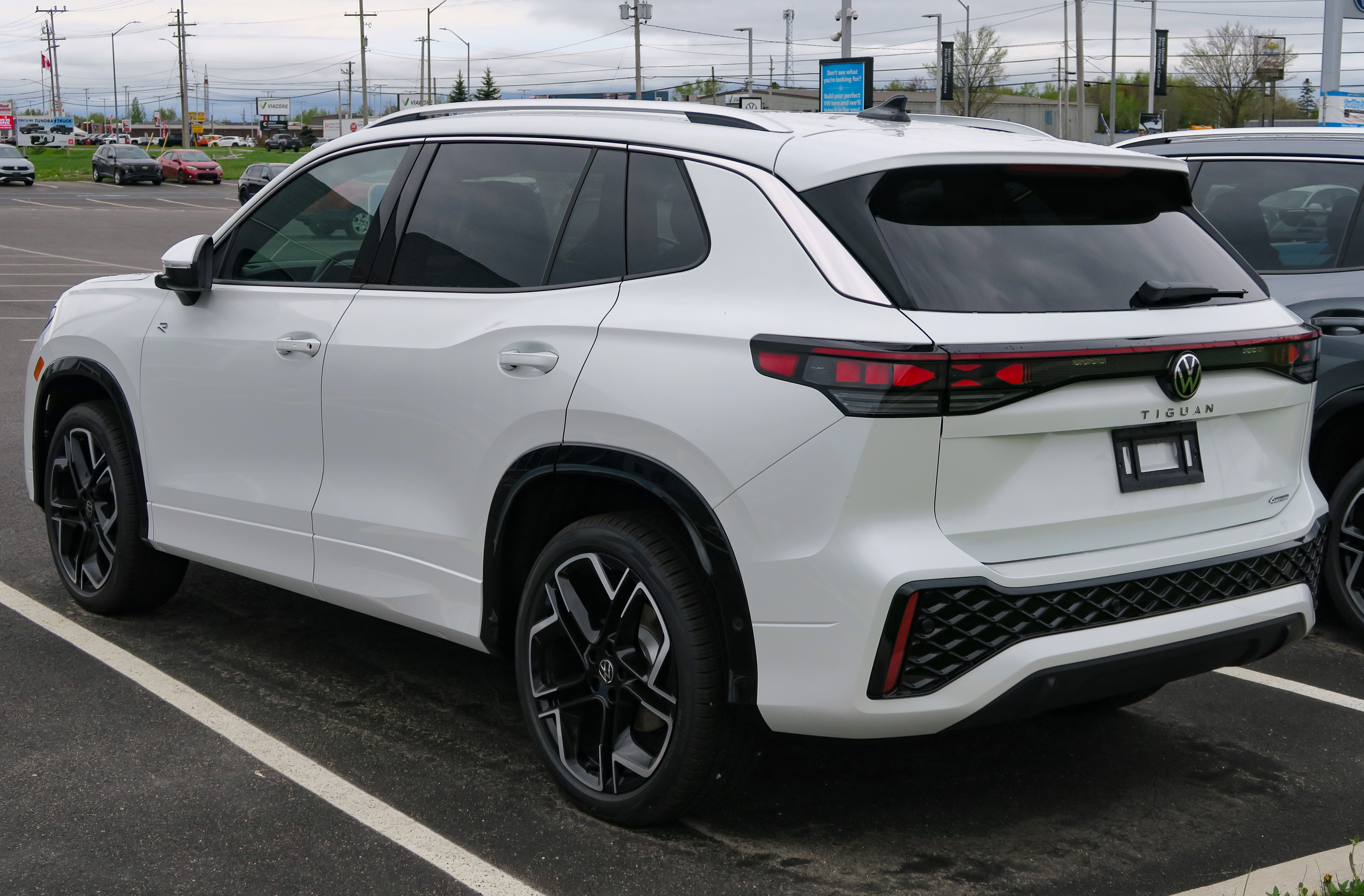
Rear view

=== Safety ===
ANCAP test results Volkswagen Tiguan all variants (2024, aligned with Euro NCAP)
Test	Points	%
Overall:	5 /5 stars	
Adult occupant:	33.53	83%
Child occupant:	43.25	88%
Pedestrian:	53.46	84%
Safety assist:	15.28	84%

Euro NCAP test results VW Tiguan 2.0 TDI Life (LHD) (2024)
Test	Points	%
Overall:	5 /5 stars	
Adult occupant:	33.5	83%
Child occupant:	43.2	88%
Pedestrian:	53.5	84%
Safety assist:	14.2	78%

== Sales ==
Calendar year	Global production	Europe	Turkey	China^{†}				United States		Mexico	Brazil	Russia
Calendar year	Global production	Europe	Turkey	Tiguan L	Tiguan L PHEV	Tiguan X	Total	Tiguan	Tiguan Limited	Mexico	Brazil	Russia
2007	16,272	6,891										
2008	150,416	92,638								53		
2009	145,002	105,601								1,539	431	
2010	276,212	104,971					70,112			2,673	3,943	
2011	356,187	110,409					129,172	25,990		2,994	5,599	
2012	453,081	151,517					173,062	31,731		3,560	4,480	
2013	472,958	142,523					199,782	30,002		4,042	5,599	
2014	515,349	150,641					237,404	25,121		3,881	4,242	
2015	501,712	148,338					255,751	35,843		3,835	1,816	
2016	548,687	178,333					240,510	43,638		3,176	1,002	
2017	769,870	236,323					340,032	21,023	25,960	9,604	1,418	27,666
2018	861,331	250,842					303,374	89,476	13,546	14,760	5,773	33,530
2019	910,926	264,762					228,951	109,572	391	14,548	13,077	37,242
2020	754,276	176,288	10,428				190,444	100,687	20	9,219	8,320	32,982
2021	598,656	132,601	8,546				164,649	109,743	4	9,009	3,418	29,232
2022	604,536	116,334	4,425				155,147	71,085		11,582	54	
2023	633,147		8,654	149,529	4,491	5,680	159,700	76,227		12,478	790	
2024	546,000		12,772	173,058	1,390	1,931	176,379	94,372		14,265	2,931	
2025			9,001	200,019	559	180	200,758	78,621		19,419		

^{† excluding imported models}
