= Vorobyov =

Vorobyov, Vorobiev, Vorobiov, Vorobyev (Russian: Воробьёв, Ukrainian: Воробйов) and Vorobyova (Воробьёва; feminine) are various transliterations of an East Slavic surname. People with this surname include:

- Aleksandr Vorobyov (born 1962), Soviet football player
- Aleksandra Vorobyova (born 1989), Russian singer
- Alexey Vorobyov (born 1988), Russian singer and actor
- Andrei Vorobyov (born 1982), Russian footballer
- Andrey Yuryevich Vorobyov (born 1970), governor of Moscow Oblast
- Andrey Vorobiev (born 1985), Russian politician
- Arkady Vorobyov (1924–2012), Russian middle-heavyweight
- Boris Vorobyov (1949–2019), Soviet rower
- Dmitry Vorobiev (born 1985), Russian ice hockey player
- Evgeny Vorobiov (born 1976), Russian chess grandmaster
- Grigory Vorobiev (1929–2019), Soviet/Russian sports physician
- Henadii Vorobiov (1961–2017), Ukrainian Colonel general
- Irina Vorobieva (1958–2022), Soviet pair skater
- Ivan Vorobyov (disambiguation), several persons
- Julia Vorobieva (born 1974), Azerbaijani figure skater
- Konstantin Dmitrievich Vorobyov (1919–1975), a Soviet writer
- Marie Vorobieff (1892–1984), Russian painter
- Maksim Vorobyov (born 1976), Russian businessman and investor
- Maksim Vorobyov (1787–1855), Russian painter
- Mikhail Vorobyev (1896–1957), Soviet marshal of the corps of engineers
- Mikhail Vorobyev (ice hockey) (born 1997), Russian ice hockey player
- Nikolai Vorobyov (disambiguation), several persons
- Oleksandr Vorobiov (born 1984), Ukrainian gymnast
- Pavel Vorobyev (born 1982), Russian ice hockey player
- Pyotr Vorobyov (born 1949), Russian ice hockey player and coach
- Roman Vorobyov (born 1984), Russian footballer
- Valeriy Vorobyov (born 1970), Ukrainian footballer
- Vladimir Vorobyov (the elder) (1876–1940), archpriest of the Russian Orthodox Church
- Vladimir Mikhailovich Vorobyov (born 1969) is an officer of the Russian Navy
- Vladimir Vorobiev (born 1972), Russian hockey player
- Youri Vorobyov, Soviet-born coach of acrobatic gymnastics
- Yuri Vorobyov (born 1948), Russian politician

== See also ==
- Sparrow Hills, aka Vorobyovy Gory, a locality in Moscow, Russia
