= 2023 Moscow Oblast gubernatorial election =

| ← 2018 | 8–10 September 2023 | 2028 → |
- Turnout: 60.48%
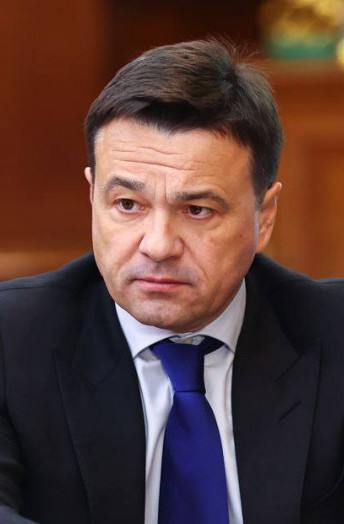
| | | CPRF |
| Candidate | Andrey Vorobyov | Aleksandr Naumov |
| Party | United Russia | CPRF |
| Popular vote | 3,078,424 | 234,212 |
| Percentage | 83.67% | 6.37% |
Governor before election
Andrey Vorobyov
United Russia
Governor-elect
Andrey Vorobyov
United Russia

The 2023 Moscow Oblast gubernatorial election took place on 8–10 September 2023, on common election day. Incumbent Governor Andrey Vorobyov was re-elected to a third term in office.

== Background ==
Then–United Russia faction leader in the State Duma Andrey Vorobyov was appointed acting Governor of Moscow Oblast in November 2012, replacing Sergey Shoigu, who was appointed Minister of Defence after serving just 5 months as Governor of the region, adjacent to the federal capital – Moscow. Vorobyov is viewed as Shoigu's confidant, as the governor's father, Yuri Vorobyov, was Shoigu's long–time deputy in the Ministry of Emergency Situations. Vorobyov overwhelmingly won gubernatorial elections in 2013 and 2018 with 78.94% and 62.52% of the vote, respectively.

The upcoming gubernatorial election is unlikely to be competitive, as Andrey Vorobyov has decent ratings and constantly tops in various governance metrics. Statewide elections in Moscow Oblast are also quite difficult for oppositional candidates to compete in due to oblast's size and its dependence on Moscow's expensive economic, transport and media markets. On June 1, 2023 President Vladimir Putin in a meeting with Andrey Vorobyov endorsed the incumbent for a third gubernatorial term.

== Candidates ==
In Moscow Oblast candidates for Governor can be nominated only by registered political parties. Candidate for Governor of Moscow Oblast should be a Russian citizen and at least 30 years old. Candidates for Governor should not have a foreign citizenship or residence permit. Each candidate in order to be registered is required to collect at least 7% of signatures of members and heads of municipalities (196–205 signatures). Also gubernatorial candidates present 3 candidacies to the Federation Council and election winner later appoints one of the presented candidates. In 2021 "On Common Principles of Organisation of Public Authority in the Subjects of the Russian Federation" law was enacted, which lifted term limits for Russian governors, Moscow Oblast amended its legislation to remove term limits in September 2022, allowing Vorobyov to seek a third full term.

=== Registered ===
- Aleksandr Naumov (CPRF), Deputy Chairman of the Moscow Oblast Duma (2021–present), Member of Moscow Oblast Duma (2007–present)
- Anatoly Nikitin (SR–ZP), Member of Moscow Oblast Duma (2021–present)
- Andrey Vorobyov (United Russia), incumbent Governor of Moscow Oblast (2012–present)
- Kirill Zhigarev (LDPR), Deputy Chairman of the Moscow Oblast Duma (2016–present), Member of Moscow Oblast Duma (2011–present), son of former State Duma member Sergey Zhigarev, 2018 gubernatorial candidate

=== Failed to qualify ===
- Boris Nadezhdin (Civic Initiative), Member of Dolgoprudny Council of Deputies (1990–1997, 2019–present), former Member of State Duma (1999–2003), 2018 Party of Growth gubernatorial candidate

=== Eliminated at United Russia convention ===
- Alexander Tolmachev, Member of State Duma (2021–present)
- Olga Zabralova, Senator from Moscow Oblast (2021–present)

=== Declined ===
- Igor Chistyukhin (SR–ZP), Deputy Chairman of the Moscow Oblast Duma (2011–present), 2018 gubernatorial candidate
- Kleopatra Orlova (New People), psychologist, life coach

=== Candidates for Federation Council ===
- Aleksandr Naumov (CPRF):
  - Vladimir Barsukov, Member of Moscow Oblast Duma (2021–present)
  - Vasily Byzov, Member of Lyubertsy Council of Deputies (2019–present)
  - Yelena Mokrinskaya, Member of Moscow Oblast Duma (2021–present)

== Finances ==
All sums are in rubles.

| Financial Report | Source | Nadezhdin | Naumov | Nikitin | Vorobyov | Zhigarev |
|---|---|---|---|---|---|---|
| First | | 20,700 | 220,000 | 600,000 | 300,000,000 | 250,000 |
| Final | | 20,700 | 9,920,000 | 17,400,000 | 300,000,000 | 21,550,000 |

== Polls ==
| Fieldwork date | Polling firm | Vorobyov | Nikitin | Zhigarev | Naumov | None | Lead |
|---|---|---|---|---|---|---|---|
| 25 July – 10 August 2023 | FOM | 70% | 10% | 10% | 9% | 2% | 60% |

== Results ==
Summary of the 8–10 September 2023 Moscow Oblast gubernatorial election results
| Candidate | Party | Votes | % |
|---|---|---|---|
| Andrey Vorobyov (incumbent) | United Russia | 3,078,424 | 83.67 |
| Aleksandr Naumov | Communist Party | 234,212 | 6.37 |
| Kirill Zhigarev | Liberal Democratic Party | 177,210 | 4.82 |
| Anatoly Nikitin | A Just Russia — For Truth | 149,262 | 4.06 |
| Valid votes | | 3,639,108 | 98.91 |
| Blank ballots | | 39,906 | 1.08 |
| Total | | 3,679,051 | 100.00 |
| Turnout | | 3,679,051 | 60.48 |
| Registered voters | | 6,083,227 | 100.00 |

Governor Vorobyov re-appointed incumbent Senator Olga Zabralova (United Russia) to the Federation Council.

== See also ==
- 2023 Russian regional elections
