= 2013 Moscow Oblast gubernatorial election =

- September 8, 2013
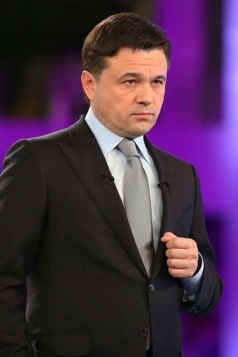

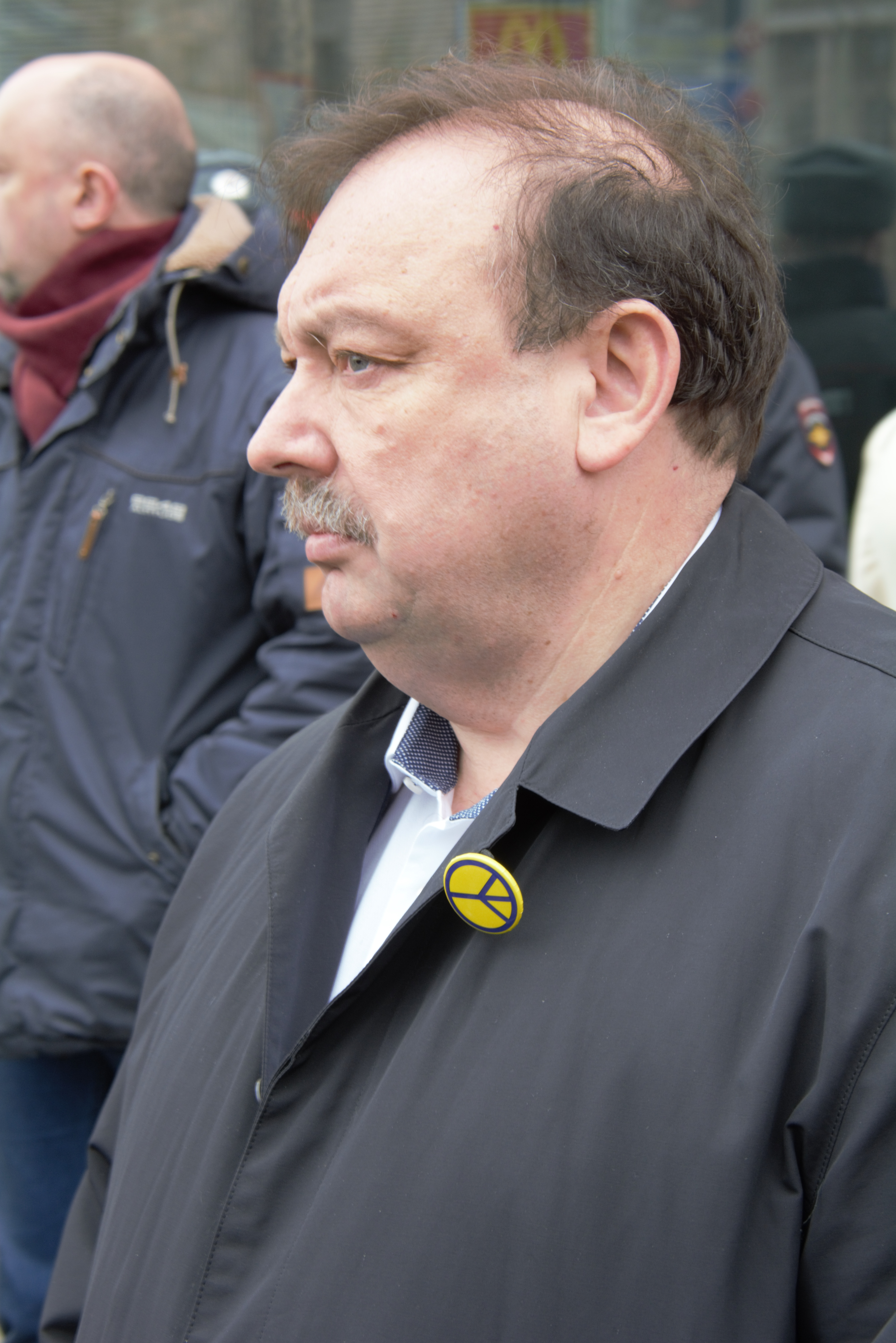

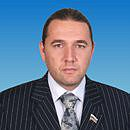

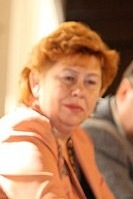

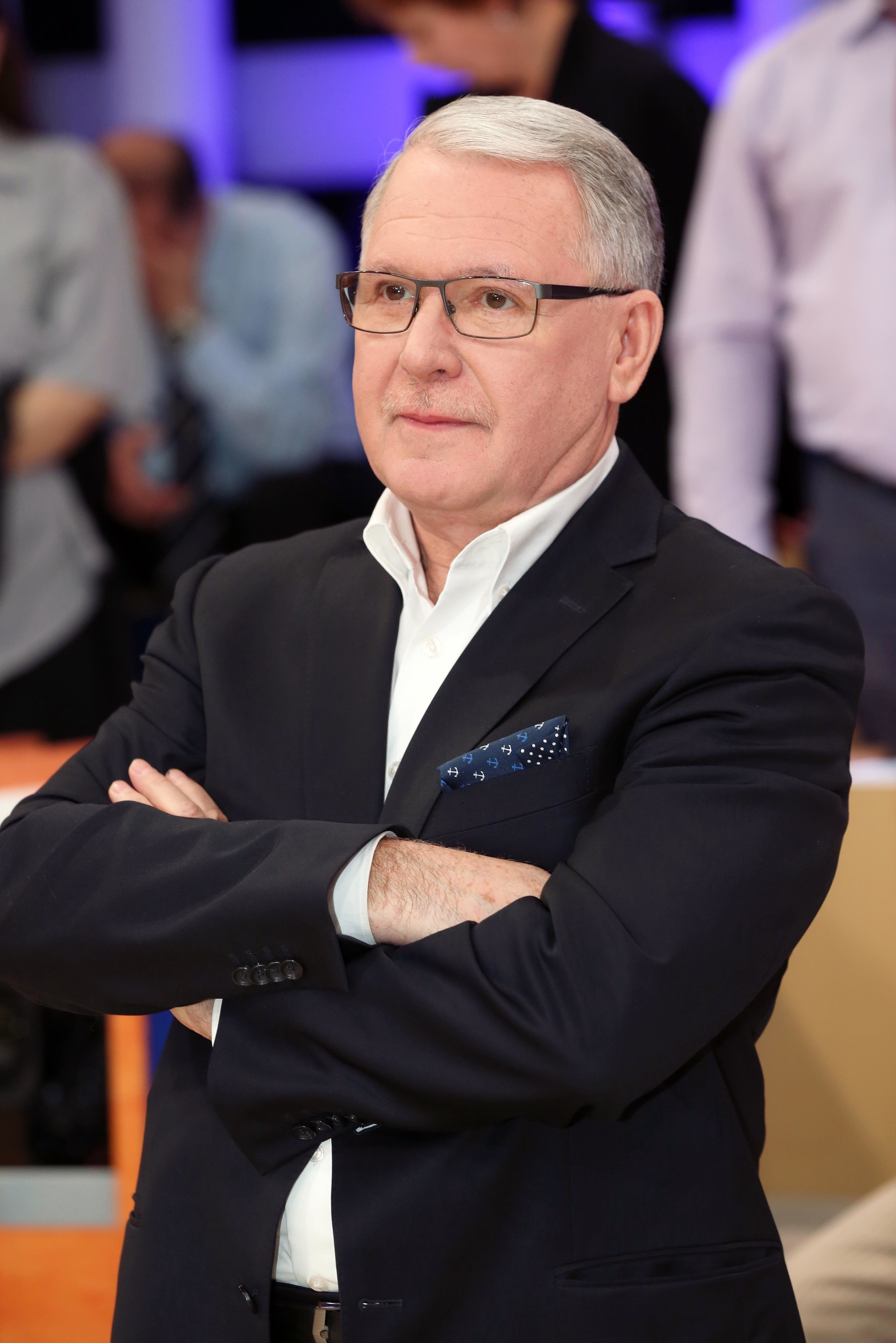
Candidate	Andrey Vorobyov	Konstantin Cheremisov	Gennady Gudkov
Party	United Russia	CPRF	Yabloko
Popular vote	1,655,479	161,969	92,977
Percentage	78.94%	7.72%	4.43%
Candidate	Maxim Shingarkin	Nadezhda Korneeva	Alexander Romanovich
Party	LDPR	Patriots of Russia	A Just Russia
Popular vote	52,938	47,640	38,315
Percentage	2.52%	2.27%	1.83%
Governor before election
Andrey Vorobyov
United Russia
Elected Governor
Andrey Vorobyov
United Russia

Moscow Oblast gubernatorial election of 2013 was held on September 8, 2013 as part of the regional elections, where 9 other oblasts held elections. It was also the same day as the mayoral election in the federal city of Moscow.

== Regulations ==
A candidate to the office must be a citizen of the Russian Federation over the age of 30, and must state to the Moscow Oblast Elections Commission that they do not own any cash or money in banks aboard, thus according to new Federal Law against corruption.

The candidate needs to collect 351 signatures from every 54 cities of the Moscow Oblast, in support of the nomination and shall be made within 20 days of the official publication of the decision to call the election. These signatures are not needed for candidates from registered political parties.

== Campaign ==
In March 2012, through the approval process of the regional legislature, The Moscow Oblast Duma, Sergey Shoygu was appointed as the governor of Moscow Oblast. The United Russia party has proposed him to the post of governor and his candidacy was unanimously supported by the Moscow Regional Duma. Shoygu took into office on May 11, 2012, after the expiry of the term of office of the former governor, Boris Gromov.

In May 2012, by the initiative of President Dmitry Medvedev, a federal law has been approved and according to the law, the direct elections of regional governors have returned. The law came into force on 1 June 2012. According to this law the first election of senior officials was scheduled to be held on October 14, 2012 in some regions of the Russian Federation.

Six months after taking office, the governor Sergey Shoygu left after he was appointed as the Minister of Defense, due to the fact that the previous Minister of Defence, Anatoly Serdyukov, was sacked. On November 8, 2012, President Vladimir Putin has appointed Andrei Vorobyov, who previously headed the faction of "United Russia" in the State Duma.

Before the 2013 election, the regional elections were held twice a year - in March and October. Both called single day of voting. During 2012, the State Duma draft law on the single day of voting. The bill was passed in September 2012 and was approved by the Federation Council.

In accordance with the draft law, all the regional elections will be held on the same day - the second Sunday in September. In 2013, therefore, they will take place on September 8. This day will be elected by all the authorities who their governors term expired until September 2013.

After the resignation of Sergey Shoygu from the Gubernatorial office, The Kremlin spokesman, Dmitry Peskov, said that "people will be appointed who will be acting governor until the next single voting day, that is almost a year. There is no other mechanism. "

The decision to call the election shall be made not earlier than 100 days and no later than 90 days before election day, and then should published in the mass media, not later than five days from the date of its adoption. On June 6, 2013 the members of the Moscow Regional Duma approved the election date for governor of the Moscow region, so the elections scheduled for September 8, 2013.

On June 11, 2013, The Moscow Oblast Elections Commission (Mosoblizbirkom) began receiving documents for participation in the elections from potential candidates.

In January 2013, the chairman of the Civil Society Fund and a former head of the internal policy of the Presidential Administration of Russia, Konstantin Kostin said that in his opinion on the election of the governor of the Moscow region of the second round will be: "The fact is that today there is no candidate who could really resist Andrey Vorobiev and the 'United Russia'. We are talking about the scale and the resources and experience of the real work ".

On January 29, 2013, the Acting Governor of the Moscow region, Andrei Vorobyov presented his program of social and economic development until 2015 "Our suburbs", denoting it as the election. According to the deputy chairman of the Duma Committee on International Affairs, Alexander Romanovich, the performance of Andrei Vorobyov - this is the real beginning of the election campaign in Moscow Oblast.

On March 22, 2013 the State Duma passed in the third and final reading of a law granting the subjects of the Russian Federation the right to elect the governor did not direct vote of the region's population, and the local parliament.

On March 27 amendments to the law were approved by the Federation Council. In this regard, the acting governor of the Moscow region, Andrei Vorobyov said retaining direct gubernatorial elections in the region. On April 2 law signed by Russian president Vladimir Putin.

In November 2012 the candidates to Gubernatorial office began to send their documents to the Electoral Commission. The process for receiving documents and signatures was finished in June 2013.

== Candidates ==
16 candidates were nominated by their respective parties:

- Andrey Vorobyev, from the United Russia party, acting governor of Moscow Oblast, one of the leaders of United Russia party
- Elena Grishina, from the Russian Ecological Party "The Greens", Businesswoman, Chairman of Airies PRO Company
- Gennady Gudkov, supported by Yabloko and RPR-PARNAS, current member of Russian Opposition Coordination Council, candidate of united "opposition of Bolotnaya Square", former member of Russian State Duma and former member of A Just Russia Party
- Nikolay Dizhur, born 13 Oct 1961, supported by political party Communists of Russia
- Aleksey Zvyagin, born 5 May 1956, Businessman, Deputy Chairman of Eco-Aerostalker Company for Investments and Economic Development (Homeland Party)
- Svetlana Kazantseva, born 19 Feb 1954, Technician from Su-155 Company (For Woman of Russia party)
- Nadezhda Korneeva, activist (Patriots of Russia)
- Olga Ogiyevskaya, born 26 Nov 1974, Chairman of The "Yurved" Research Law Center (Citizens' Force party)
- Sirazhdin Pamazanov, born 5 Mar 1976, Politician, Leader of Social Democratic Party of Russia (formed in 2012)
- Alexandr Romanovich, born 15 Oct 1952, former member of State Duma (A Just Russia)
- Yuriy Topilin, born 24 May 1962, Deputy Chairman of the Commercial Operator of Russian Energy Complex Company (Cossack Party of Russia)
- Alexander Fedulov, born 8 Nov 1958 (Russia's Party for National Security)
- Gleb Fetisov, from the Alliance of Greens – The People's Party, Head of the Council for Research Export Forces under Russian Academy of Sciences and Ministry for Economic Development, one of the leaders of Green Alliance–The People's Party, a member of Public Chamber of Russia, businessman, one of the owners of Altimo
- Konstantin Chermisov, Leader of the Communist Party of the Russian Federation in Moscow Oblast
- Maxim Chigarkin, member of State Duma, Deputy Head of SD Committee for Natural Resources and Ecology (Political party LDPR)
- Vladimir Shchipanov, born 30 Aug 1954 (Pensioners Party of Russia)

6 of them were registered:

- Andrey Vorobyev, from the United Russia
- Gennady Gudkov, supported by Yabloko
- Nadezhda Korneeva, from Patriots of Russia
- Alexander Romanovich, from A Just Russia
- Konstantin Chermisov, from Communist Party
- Maxim Chigarkin, from Liberal Democratic Party

== Results ==
Summary of the 8 September 2013 Moscow Oblast gubernatorial election, 2013
Candidate	Party	Votes	%
Andrey Vorobyov	United Russia	1,655,479	78.93%
Konstantin Cheremisov	Communist Party	161,969	7.72%
Gennady Gudkov	Independent	92,977	4.43%
Maxim Shingarkin	Liberal Democratic Party	52,938	2.52%
Nadezhda Korneeva	Patriots of Russia	47,640	2.27%
Alexander Romanovich	A Just Russia	38,315	1.83%
Total		2,097,028	100%
Valid votes		2,049,318	97.72%
Spoilt and null votes		47,710	2.28%
Turnout		2,101,697	38.60%
Registered voters		5,445,328	Source: Избирательная комиссия Московской области Archived April 20, 2017, at the Wayback Machine

== See also ==
- 2013 Russian elections
- 2013 Moscow mayoral election
