= 2013 Moscow mayoral election =

- September 8, 2013
- Turnout: 32.3%
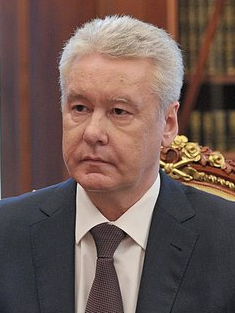

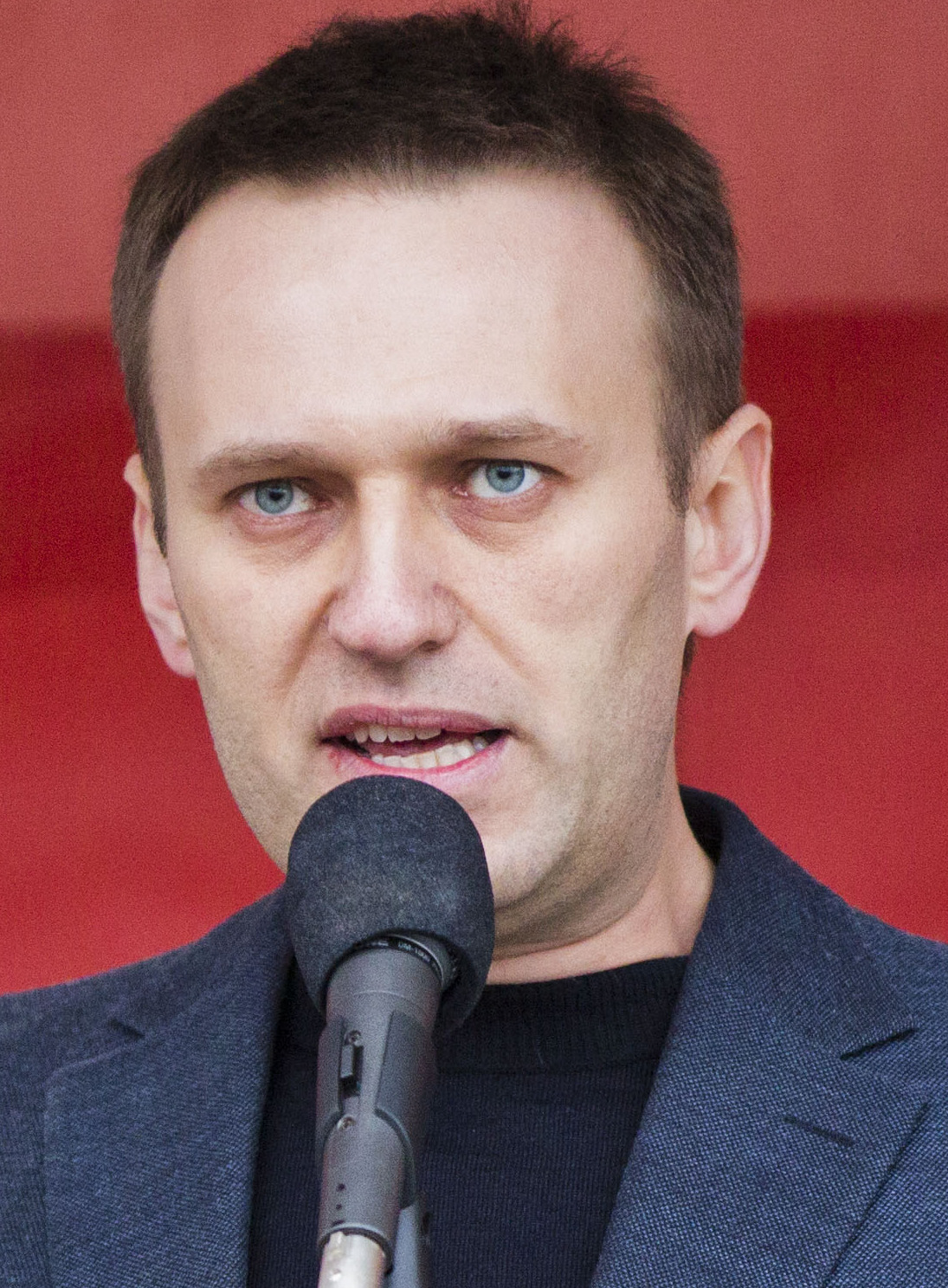

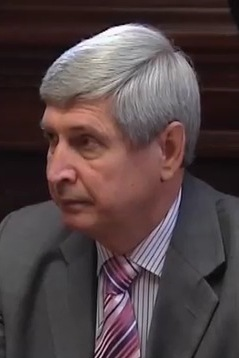
Candidate	Sergey Sobyanin	Alexei Navalny	Ivan Melnikov
Party	Independent	RPR–PARNAS	CPRF
Alliance	United Russia	KSO
Popular vote	1,193,178	632,697	248,294
Percentage	51.37%	27.24%	10.69%
Mayor before election
Sergey Sobyanin
Independent
Elected Mayor
Sergey Sobyanin
Independent

The 2013 Moscow mayoral election was held on September 8, 2013, as part of the regional elections, at the same time as the elections in Moscow Oblast and other Oblasts were held.

Elections were held after Mayor Sergey Sobyanin had announced his departure on June 4. The elections were the first time in 10 years that citizens of the federal city of Moscow could choose their mayor by a popular vote.

Moscow is both a city and separate federal subject, according to the Constitution of Russia. Most of federal subjects are headed by governors or presidents, but the office of the head of Moscow is called Mayor of Moscow, according to the Charter of the city of Moscow. Sergey Sobyanin won with 51.37% of the vote in the first round, with Alexei Navalny receiving 27.24% of the vote, significantly more than previously expected by the polls. Sobyanin was declared the winner after the first round. Voter turnout was 33.23%. The total number of registered voters was 7,176,568.

== Background ==
The position of Mayor of Moscow was elected between 1991 and 2004. In 2004, Vladimir Putin suggested a law to abolish direct elections of governors, the Moscow mayor, and presidents of Russian regions. The law was swiftly adopted by the parliament. The new legislation moved the election system to an indirect one in which parliamentary political parties and the President of Russia nominated a candidate who must then have been approved by the Moscow City Duma. Following the 2011–13 Russian protests which followed the 2011 parliamentary election, President Dmitry Medvedev offered to re-introduce the direct elections of the governors and the mayor of Moscow, and corresponding legislation was approved by the Parliament.

On June 5, 2013, the incumbent mayor, Sergey Sobyanin, who was nominated as mayor in 2010, announced his resignation from the post. Russian law allows the mayor to resign and run again for the same office if the president gives his approval. A short time later, Sobyanin confirmed his intention to stand for election.

== Regulations ==
A candidate to the office must be citizen of the Russian Federation over the age of 30. Self-nomination of candidates for the post of Mayor of Moscow, and the collection of signatures of 1% of Moscow voters (about 73 000 signatures) in support of the nomination shall be made within 30 days of the official publication of the decision to call the election. Or alternatively these signatures are not needed for candidates from registered political party.

Each of the political parties (electoral blocks were cancelled in the early 2000s) can nominate only one candidate for the post of mayor. In this case, the candidate can not give consent to be nominated from several polling organizations. The candidate nominated by self-nomination cannot give consent to be nominated in the same election by an electoral association.

A candidate for mayor of Moscow may have up to 100 "trusted representatives". The maximum amount of a candidate's election fund shall not exceed 200 million rubles. In the second round of this amount may be increased by 10 percent.

=== Municipal filter ===
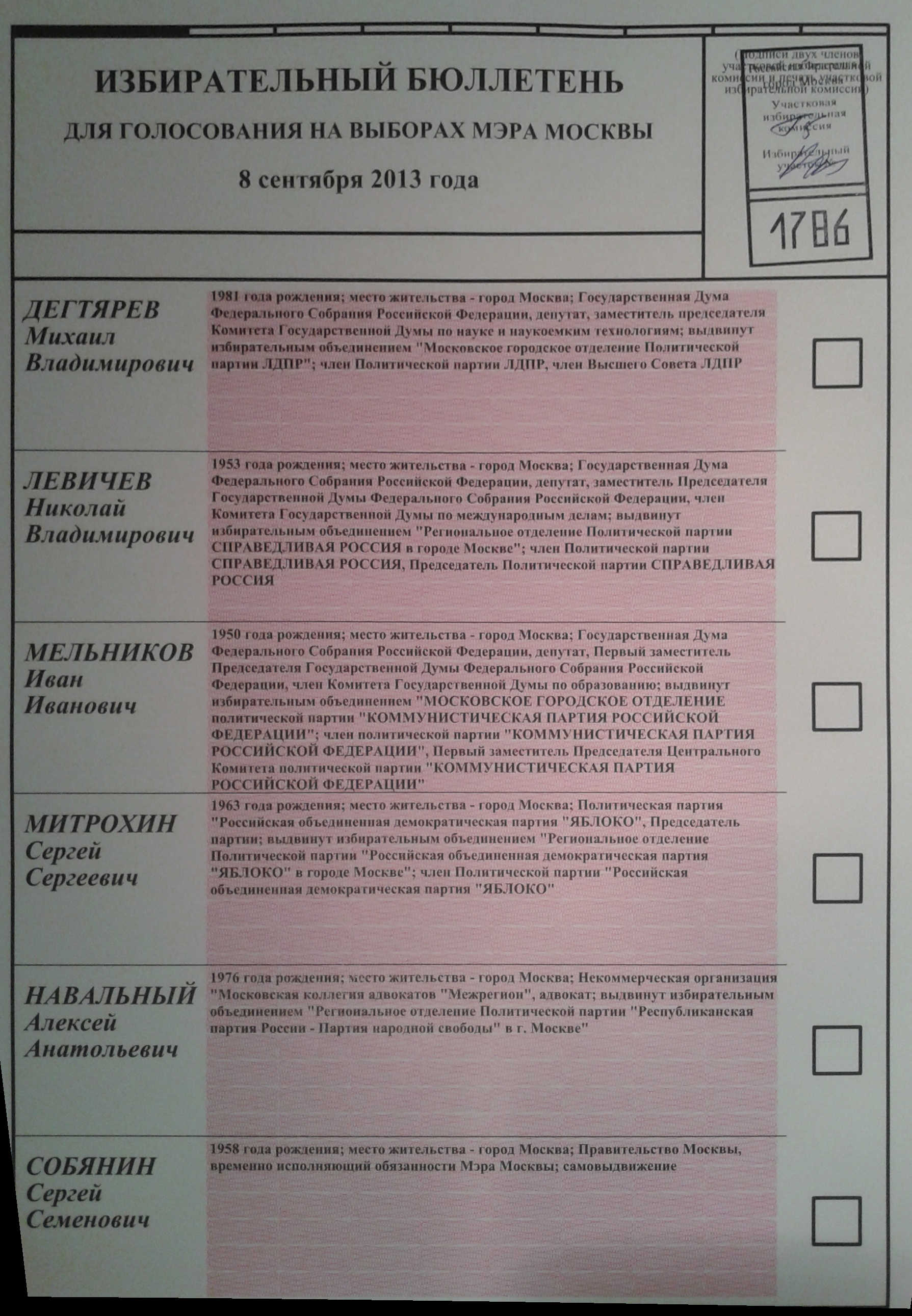
Ballot of the election

All registered candidates are required to pass so called municipal filter introduced be a federal law of 2012: all candidates are required to receive support from at least 6% of elected municipal deputies or heads of municipalities. Those supporting municipal deputies should represent no less than 75% of the federal subject's municipalities. One deputy can only support one candidate. For Moscow 2013 elections it means that every candidate should provide signatures of at least 110 elected municipal deputies representing 75% of all Moscow municipalities. Since most municipalities are controlled by the United Russia party the municipal filter is especially hard to pass for the opposition candidates.

=== Criteria for election ===
To be elected a candidate must get more than 50% of votes. If no one achieves 50%, a runoff is to be held in 14 days. Only the two most successful candidates from the first round participate in the second round.

== Election date ==
In a vote held on June 6, 27 members of Moscow City Duma backed the proposed date, and only two voted against it.

== Registered candidates ==
Registration for the election was completed on July 17.

- Ivan Melnikov, from the Communist Party of the Russian Federation, a professor at Moscow State University.
- Nikolai Levichev, current Chairman of A Just Russia Party.
- Mikhail Degtyarev, from the Liberal Democratic Party of Russia.
- Sergey Sobyanin, running as self-nominated, acting Mayor of Moscow, one of the leaders of political party United Russia, current member of bureau of the Supreme Council of the United Russia, current member of presidium of Regional Council of the United Russia in Moscow and the head (political council secretary) of the party's Moscow branch from March 2011 to December 2012.
- Sergey Mitrokhin, current Chairman of Yabloko Party, former Head of Yabloko's Moscow branch and former Moscow City Duma member.
- Alexei Navalny, running as the candidate of the Republican Party of Russia – People's Freedom Party (but he is nonpartisan citizen) and supported by Russian Opposition Coordination Council (he is a Coordination Council member), anti-corruption activist and blogger, one of the leaders of Russian opposition and protesters in 2011–13, informal leader of the unregistered political party People's Alliance.

== Potential candidates ==
About 40 persons sought or expressed interest in participating in the elections.

Candidates who failed "municipal filter"

- Gleb Fetisov, one of the leaders of Alliance of Greens – The People's Party, a member of Public Chamber of Russia, businessman, one of the owners of Altimo
- Svetlana Peunova, leader of the Volya Party
- Sergey Troitsky, leader of thrash metal music band Korrozia Metalla
- Alyona Popova, Civilian Power
- Samson Sholademi, businessman and blogger (abandoned his campaign in protest against Sobyanin helping Navalny to pass the "municipal filter").

Expressed interest in participating

- Andrey Nechaev, former Minister of Economic Development
- Maxim Suraykin, leader of political party Communists of Russia

== Results ==
Navalny result by district

Sobyanin result by district

The results were (turnout was 32.07%):

Candidate	Party	Votes	%
Sergey Sobyanin	Independent (Note: Member of the United Russia party)	1,193,178	52.17
Alexei Navalny	People's Freedom Party (Note: Non-partisan, but nominated by RPR–PARNAS)	632,697	27.67
Ivan Melnikov	Communist Party of the Russian Federation	248,294	10.86
Sergey Mitrokhin	Yabloko	81,493	3.56
Mikhail Degtyarev	Liberal Democratic Party of Russia	66,532	2.91
Nikolai Levichev	A Just Russia	64,778	2.83
Total		2,286,972	100.00
Valid votes		2,286,972	98.47
Invalid/blank votes		35,610	1.53
Total votes		2,322,582	100.00
Registered voters/turnout		7,250,879	32.03

== See also ==
- Moscow Oblast Gubernatorial Election, 2013
