= Igor Treskov =

- Игорь Тресков
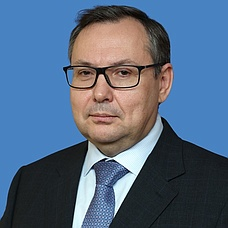

Senator from Moscow Oblast
- Incumbent
- Assumed office 1 October 2024
- Preceded by: Olga Zabralova

Personal details
- Born: 9 May 1971 (age 55) Karaul, RSFSR, Soviet Union
- Party: United Russia
- Education: Ammosov Yakutsk State University; Russian Presidential Academy of National Economy and Public Administration
- Awards: Order of Friendship; Medal of the Order "For Merit to the Fatherland"

Igor Borisovich Treskov (Russian: Игорь Борисович Тресков; born May 9, 1971, in Karaul, Kirov Oblast) is a Russian politician and a Senator of the Federation Council, representing the executive branch of the Moscow Oblast since October 1, 2024. He is a member of United Russia party.

== Biography ==
He was born in 1971. In 1994, he graduated from the Law Faculty of the Ammosov Yakutsk State University.

From 1994 to 1998, he was Lead Legal Advisor and Chief Legal Advisor at the Yakutia Commercial Bank for Social Development.

From 1998 to 2003, he was Deputy Head of Department, Acting Head of Department, and Head of Department of the Yakutsk City Administration, Sakha Republic (Yakutia).

In 2000, he graduated from the Russian Presidential Academy of National Economy and Public Administration.

From 2003 to 2007, he was Deputy Mayor of Yakutsk.

From 2007 to 2009, he was Deputy Minister of Property Relations of the Republic of Sakha (Yakutia).

From 2009 to 2012, he was Head of the Territorial Administration of the Federal Agency for State Property Management in the Republic of Sakha (Yakutia).

In September 2012, he became Head of the Regulatory and Legal Department of the Ministry of Property Relations of the Moscow Oblast.

From November 2012 to April 2016, he was Deputy Minister and First Deputy Minister of Property Relations of the Moscow Oblast.

In April 2016, he was appointed Head of the Main Directorate of Road Management of the Moscow Oblast.

From 2017 to 2019, he was Minister of Transport of the Moscow Oblast.

From October 2019 to October 2024, he was Vice Governor of the Moscow Oblast.

=== Federation Council ===
On October 2, 2024, Governor of Moscow Oblast Andrey Vorobyov was appointed a Senator of the Russian Federation — a representative of the Moscow Oblast executive branch in the Federation Council of Russia. He replaced Olga Zabralova in the Federation Council.
