= 2018 Moscow Oblast gubernatorial election =

Election in Moscow Oblast

- 9 September 2018
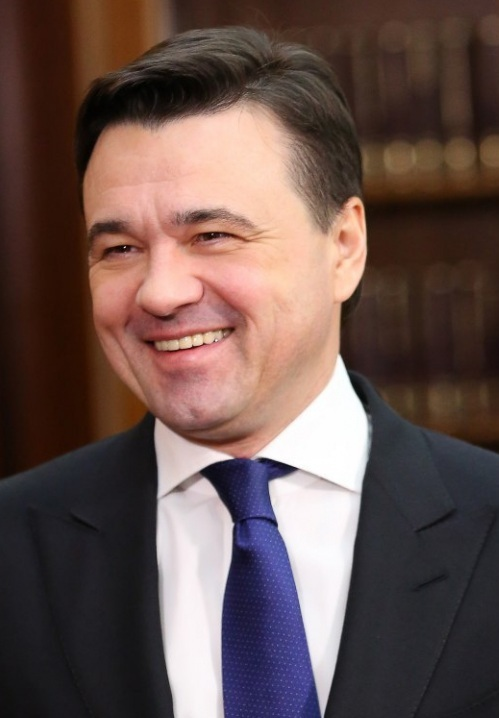

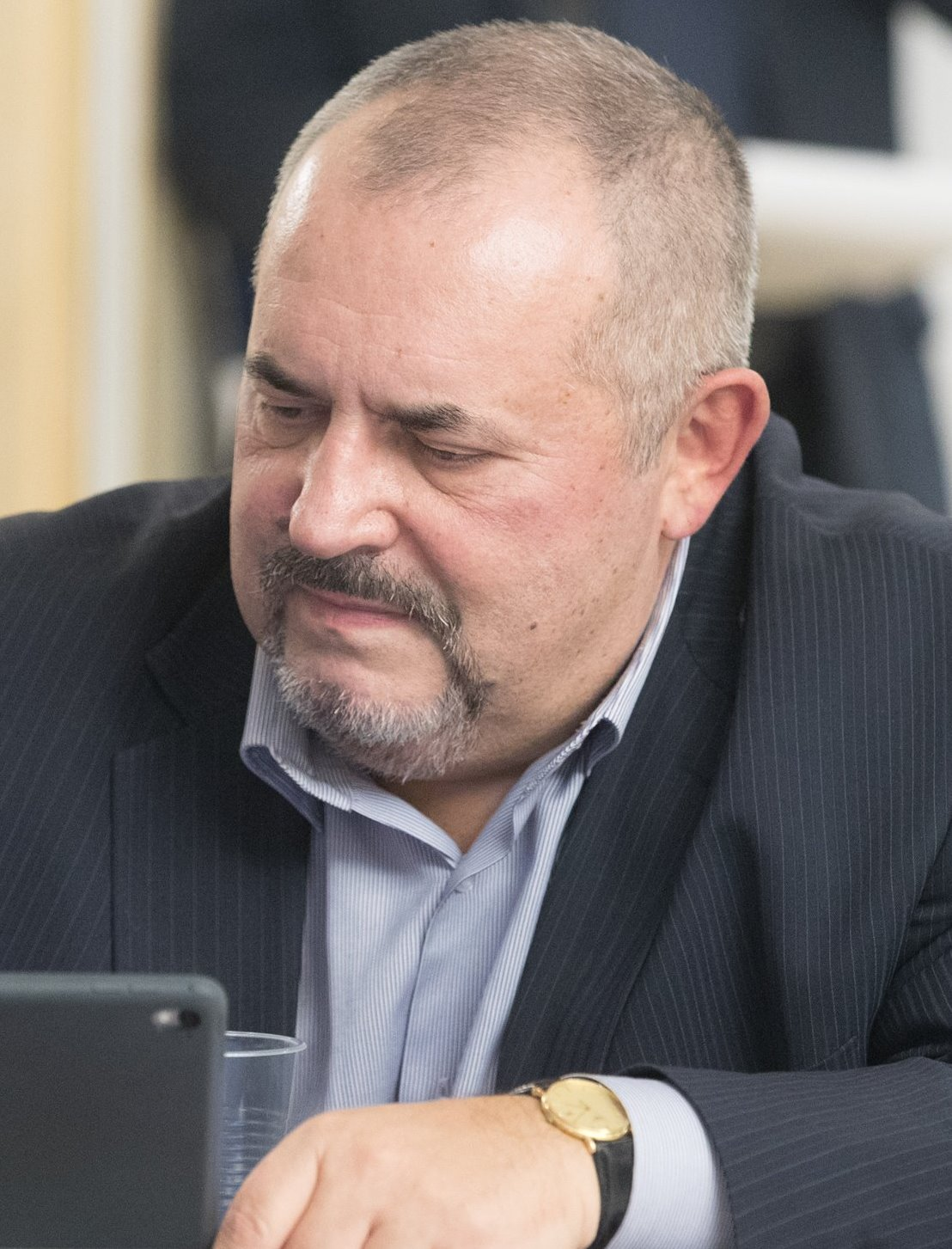
Candidate	Andrey Vorobyov	Konstantin Cheremisov	Liliya Belova
Party	United Russia	CPRF	Green Alliance
Popular vote	1,338,029	278,148	160,771
Percentage	62.52%	12.99%	7.51%
Candidate	Kirill Zhigarev	Igor Chistyukhin	Boris Nadezhdin
Party	LDPR	A Just Russia	Party of Growth
Popular vote	123,542	98,995	93,223
Percentage	5.77%	4.63%	4.36%
- Municipal results (blue – Vorobyov, red – Cheremisov)
Governor before election
Andrey Vorobyov
United Russia
Elected Governor
Andrey Vorobyov
United Russia

The 2018 Moscow Oblast gubernatorial election was held on 9 September 2018. To be elected outright, a candidate needed more than 50% of votes; if no-one achieved 50%, a runoff between the top two candidates would have been held 14 days later. Andrey Vorobyov, the incumbent governor, took 62% of the vote, and was thus re-elected for a new term.

== Candidates ==
Six candidates were registered to participate in the election.

Candidate	Party	Office
Liliya Belova	Green Alliance	Advisor to the Chairman of the Green Alliance party
Andrey Vorobyov	United Russia	Incumbent Governor of Moscow Oblast
Kirill Zhigarev	Liberal Democratic Party	Member of the Moscow Oblast Duma
Boris Nadezhdin	Party of Growth	Former Member of the State Duma
Konstantin Cheremisov	Communist Party	Member of the Moscow Oblast Duma
Igor Chistyukhin	A Just Russia	Member of the Moscow Oblast Duma

=== Other candidates ===
Candidates who fail to complete the registration
Candidate	Party	Office	Note
Nikolay Dizhur	Yabloko	Member of the Council of Deputies of the Chekhov	Rejected
Alexey Dulenkov	People's Freedom Party	Member of the Council of Deputies of the Naro-Fominsky District	Rejected
Vladimir Ryazanov	Communists of Russia	Doctor-surgeon	Rejected
Alexander Solonkin	National Course	Journalist	Withdraw
Maxim Shingarkin	Rodina	Entrepreneur	Rejected

== Results ==
Summary of the 9 September 2018 Moscow Oblast gubernatorial election results
Candidate	Party		1st round	
Candidate	Party		Votes	%
Andrey Vorobyov	United Russia	UR	1,338,029	62.52%
Konstantin Cheremisov	Communist Party	CPRF	278,148	12.99%
Liliya Belova	Green Alliance	GA	160,771	7.51%
Kirill Zhigarev	Liberal Democratic Party	LDPR	123,542	5.77%
Igor Chistyukhin	A Just Russia	JR	98,995	4.63%
Boris Nadezhdin	Party of Growth	PG	93,223	4.36%
Valid votes			2,092,708	97.78%
Blank ballots			47,595	2.22%
Turnout			2,140,303	38.51%
Registered voters			5,557,721	
Official results
