= Olga Zabralova =

Russian politician (born 1980)

- Ольга Забралова
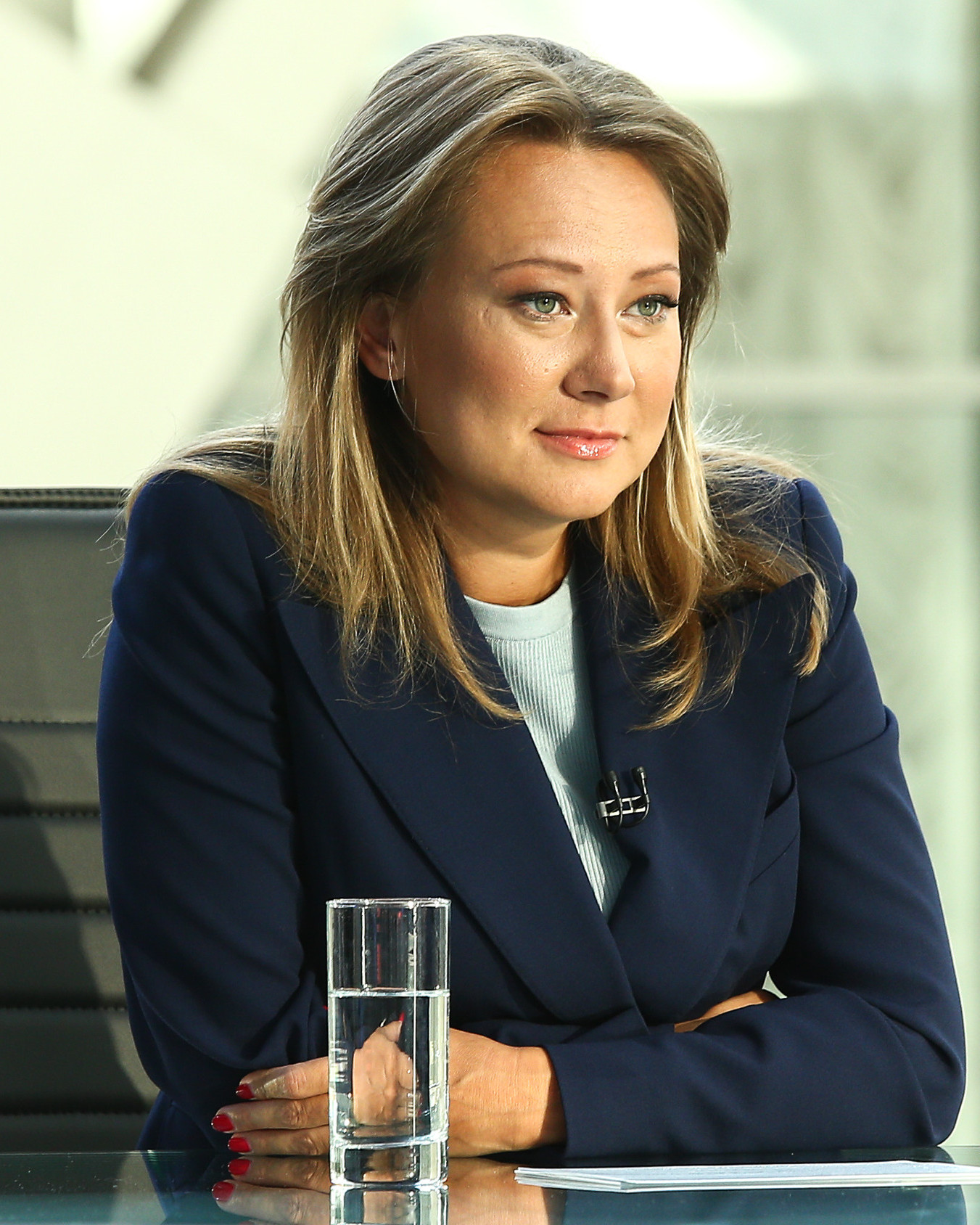

Senator from Moscow Oblast
- In office 19 May 2021 – 24 September 2024
- Preceded by: Aleksey Russkikh
- Succeeded by: Igor Treskov

Personal details
- Born: Olga Zabralova; 30 March 1980 (age 46) Moscow, Russian Soviet Federative Socialist Republic, Soviet Union
- Party: United Russia
- Education: Moscow State University
- Awards: Medal of the Order "For Merit to the Fatherland"

Olga Sergeyevna Zabralova (Russian: Ольга Сергеевна Забралова; born 30 March 1980) is a Russian politician serving as a senator from Moscow Oblast since 19 May 2021.

== Career ==
Olga Zabralova was born on 30 March 1980 in Moscow. In 2002, she graduated from the Moscow State University. From 2004 to 2012, she worked as a consultant and advisor at the State Duma. From 2012 to 2013, Zabralova worked as an Advisor to the Governor of Moscow Oblast Andrey Vorobyov. From 2013 to 2014, she was the Minister of Social Protection of the Population of the Moscow Region. On 19 May 2021, she became the senator from Moscow Oblast.

== Sanctions ==
Olga Zabralova is under personal sanctions introduced by the European Union, the United Kingdom, the United States, Canada, Switzerland, Australia, Ukraine, New Zealand, for ratifying the decisions of the "Treaty of Friendship, Cooperation and Mutual Assistance between the Russian Federation and the Donetsk People's Republic and between the Russian Federation and the Luhansk People's Republic" and providing political and economic support for Russia's annexation of Ukrainian territories.
