= Ippolit Dioumoulen =

Soviet economist (1927–2016)

- Ипполит Дюмулен
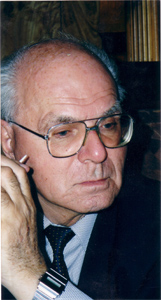
- Born: 12 May 1927; Moscow, Soviet Union
- Died: 26 September 2016 (aged 89); Moscow, Alabushevo. Russia
- Citizenship: Soviet Union, Russian Federation
- Education: USSR Institute of Foreign Trade
- Spouse: Nina Vladimirovna Yudina (1935)
- Awards: Medal "Veteran of Labour"; Honoured Scientist of the Russian Federation
- Scientific career
- Fields: international economic relations
- Institutions: All-Russian Academy of Foreign Trade, Ministry of Economic Development of the Russian Federation (ETTA)

Ippolit Ippolitovich Dioumoulen (Russian: Ипполи́т Ипполи́тович Дюмуле́н, 12 May 1927 – 26 September 2016) was a Soviet and Russian international economist, developer of Russian foreign trade policy and the Customs Union legislation, a key figure in the negotiations for Russia's accession to the WTO. Adviser for Economic Policy, Budget and Finance for the Russian Parliament.

For his research in international economic relations he was awarded the title of Honoured Scientist of the Russian Federation.

== Biography ==
Ippolit Dioumoulen was born on 12 May 1927. He graduated from high school in Moscow in 1944.

In 1949 he graduated with honours from the USSR Institute of Foreign Trade, where he completed his thesis.

After the unification of IWT and MGIMO he worked as a professor and deputy dean of the Faculty of MGIMO International Economic Relations (1964 to 1975). With his participation, methodical foundations for teaching courses on international trade and international economic relations were developed and textbooks and study materials were produced. His research and teaching activities closely related to the practical work at the USSR Ministry of Foreign Trade were appraised with the USSR Ministry of Foreign Trade insignia.

From 1975 to 1987 he worked at the United Nations Conference on Trade and Development (UNCTAD, Geneva, Switzerland). From 1984 to 1987 he was head of external relations at UNCTAD. Prolonged diplomatic work in this organization allowed him to participate as a representative of UNCTAD in international negotiations, the Tokyo Round and the Uruguay Round, out of which the World Trade Organisation was born.

From 1982 to 1984 he worked as head of the international economic organizations sector for IMEMO at the USSR Academy of Sciences.

Since 1988 he was a professor at ETTA.

Dioumoulen developed the official position of the USSR and then Russia in relation to the GATT and the WTO; participated in negotiations to determine the conditions of Russia's accession to the WTO. As a leading expert of the State Duma and the RSPP he advised the Government on the trade policy and foreign trade legislation.

In the 2000s he developed the Russian Federation foreign trade legislation (customs Code, countervailing legislation, anti-dumping and safeguard measures, state regulations on foreign trade activities, etc.). He was an author of a large number of books, articles and analytical studies on international trade, Russian Federation foreign trade and WTO issues.

In 2006, he was awarded an Honorary Diploma by the Government of the Russian Federation for scientific work and training.

He was buried at the Vagankovo Cemetery in Moscow in the Dioumoulen ancestral grave on 28 September 2016.

== Bibliography ==
An incomplete bibliography of Ippolit Dioumoulen:

- Production and Dissemination of Knowledge in the United States (1966, as an interpreter)
- The World Trade Organization (1997)
- Russia's Foreign Trade at the Turn of the Century (2001)
- International Trade in Services (2003)
- The World Trade Organisation (2003)
- International Trade: Tariff and Non-Tariff Measures (2004)
- WTO Economics, Politics, Law (2008)
- International Trade: Economy, Policy, Practice (2010)
- Foreign Trade Encyclopedia (2011)
- The World Trade Organization from A to Z (2011)
- WTO Economics, Politics, Law. 3rd edition (2011)
- International Trade. Tariff and Non-Tariff Measures. Textbook. 4th edition (2015)
- International Trade. Economics, Politics, Practice. 2nd edition (2015)

== Interesting facts ==
Ippolit Dioumoulen, his father and grandfather share identical full names: Ippolit Ippolitovich Dioumoulen.
