= House of Moscow Oblast Government =

Government House
- Russian: Дом правительства Московской области
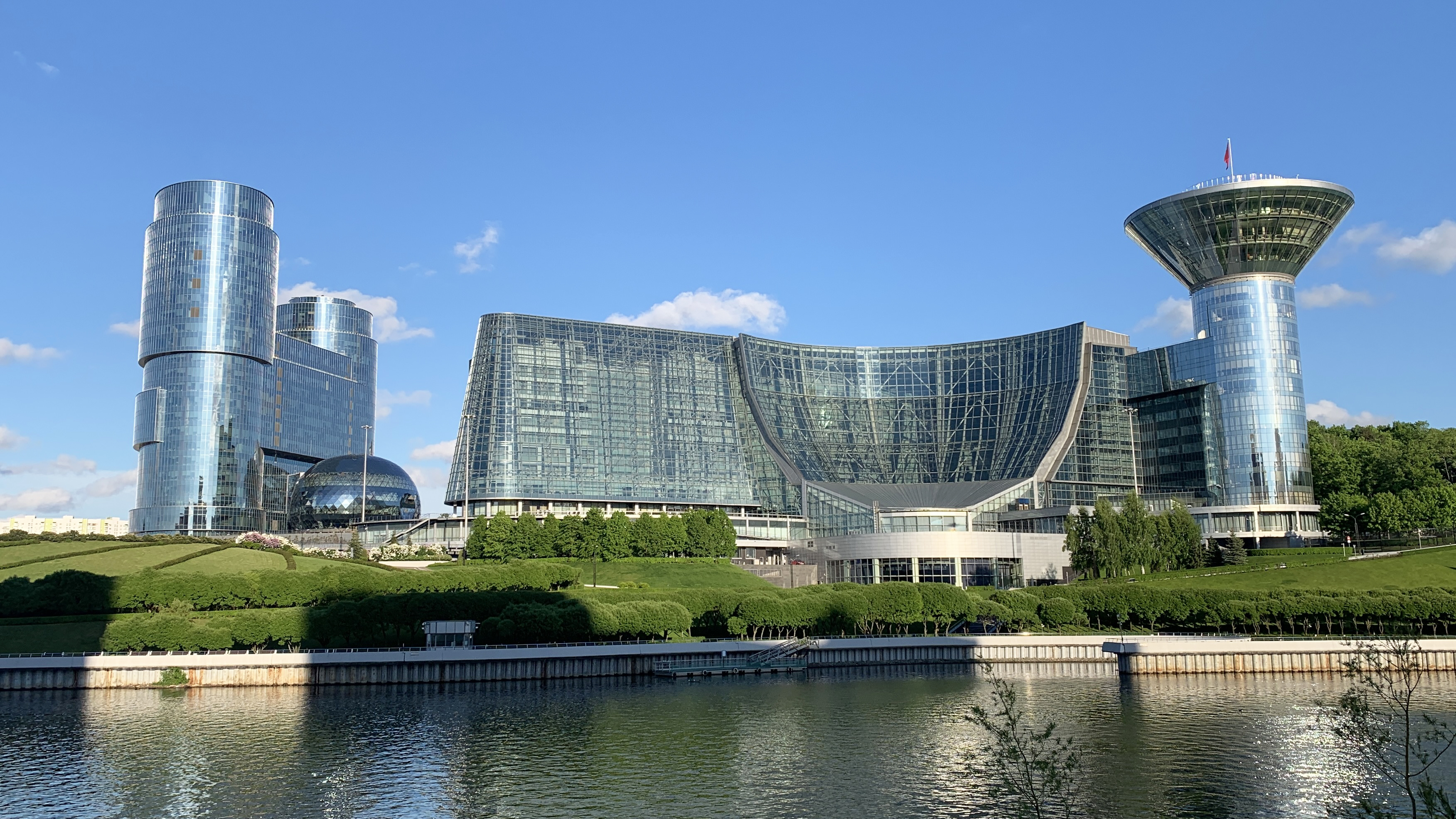
- Interactive map of the Government House area

General information
- Architectural style: Post-modernist
- Location: Moscow Oblast, Russia
- Coordinates: 55°48′58″N 37°22′51″E
- Current tenants: Andrey Vorobyov as Governor of Moscow Oblast
- Construction started: 2004; 22 years ago
- Completed: 2007; 19 years ago
- Owner: Government of Moscow Oblast

The House of Moscow Oblast Government (Russian: Дом правительства Московской области), also sometimes called the Glass City in Myakinino (Russian: Стеклянный город в Мякинино), is a government building in Krasnogorsk, Moscow Oblast, which houses the Government of Moscow Oblast and the Governor of Moscow Oblast. Construction started in 2004 and ended in 2007.

== Overview ==
With a height of 82.00 m, and with 17 floors (above ground), The building is the tallest buildings in Krasnogorsk town, near Myakininio on the Moscow river's west bank.

The building of the Moscow Region Government including main object of all future development. The house collected under one building all the ministries and departments of Moscow government.

The building resembles a spacecraft from a sci-fi movie. It consists of several interconnected buildings. They are all different shapes and height. But the main feature is that the building is completely glass. Depending on the lighting and time of day it changes color. In general, this is a unique idea - to make the government building, as it were transparent.

Within two giant atrium, smoothly transitioning from one to another. A lot of glass and metal. Transparent lifts and escalators. At different levels of broken miniature gardens. The result was a such a mini-city inside the building.

The Tower of the governor. In a circular 17-storey tower height of 90 meters is housing offices and reception heads of government ministries. The upper floors offer views of Moscow and near Moscow. And the roof is likely to be a helipad. other helipad is located in the park, right in front of the business center, near the building.

The building of the regional court. The Court has already built and running. In general, this building does not apply to the project, it was immediately before the start of a grand building construction.

Exhibition area. On the lower floors of the government - exhibition and concert halls. In addition, there are many conference rooms and meeting rooms. And almost all the windows out to the coastal area and gardens.

The Yacht Club. The draft of the complex there is a business building with a yacht club. But while this is only part of the project, which has not yet started to build. Yacht Club fits into one park, There have already built the embankment. There are plans to build two more berths.

The Underground parking. Two multi-level parking, here should accommodate about 2,000 vehicles.

== See also ==
- White House (Moscow)
