= Maksim Vorobyov =

Maksim Vorobyov may refer to:

- Maksim Vorobyov (businessman) (born 1976), Russian businessman and investor
- Maksim Vorobyov (painter) (1787–1855), Russian landscape painter
