= Alyona Popova =

Russian human rights activist

- Алёна Попова
- Born: Alyona Vladimirovna Popova; 15 February 1983 (age 43); Yekaterinburg, Russia, Soviet Union
- Years active: 2013–present
- Political party: Yabloko

Alyona Vladimirovna Popova (Russian: Алёна Владимировна Попова; born on 15 February 1983) is a Russian human rights activist who is known for her digital campaign against domestic violence in Russia, and as one of the founders, together with Alexandra Mitroshina, of a social media flash mob with the catch phrase, "I did not want to die" (#ЯНеХотелаУмирать, #YaNeKhotelaUmirat).

== Biography ==
Alyona Popova was born in Yekaterinburg on 15 February 1983, later settled in Novosibirsk, where she lived until 1999, and moved to Moscow in 2000. She began her career as a journalist in 1998, leading regional broadcasting projects in Yekaterinburg. From 2001 to 2003 she worked as a parliamentary correspondent for the Globus news agency, covering the work of the State Duma and the Federation Council.

Popova earned a law degree from Kutafin Moscow State Law University and a journalism degree from Lomonosov Moscow State University in 2005.

In 2008, she founded and became the CEO of the VideoSnack project, which provides video content for mobile devices in Russia, Italy, France, the United States, and Canada. In 2011, she simultaneously launched two entrepreneurship-focused projects: Startup Poster (Rusbase), supporting the market for venture projects and investments in Russia; and Startup Women, aimed at developing women's IT entrepreneurship in Russia.

By 2010, Popova began volunteering. After taking part in extinguishing fires in the Moscow Oblast and in Siberia, she founded the volunteer organization "Civil Corps", a disaster-relief organization.

With her focus on domestic violence issues, she launched the project Ti Ne Odna (You Are Not Alone) in 2016, aimed at protecting women's rights and combating domestic violence. Later, she began trolling pro-Kremlin politicians by stuffing the letterboxes of MPs with photographs of battered women, along with long printed lists containing their names. According to Popova and to official records, domestic violence kills at least 12,000 women in Russia each year. Nevertheless, in February 2018, Russian President Vladimir Putin softened domestic violence legislation, making it easier for abusers to harm women.

On 3 April 2018, the Russian government refused to allow a protest against sexual harassment. Popova said city authorities told organizers that planned demonstration could not be held because another public event had already been scheduled on Manezh Square at around the same time. The rally had originally been planned for 29 March, but was postponed due to a mall fire in Kemerovo that killed 64 people. On 12 April, she was arrested for the rally and for a call on Leonid Slutsky's resignation from the State Duma. She was fined with 20,000 rubles by the court for violating the protest law.

Popova's political aspirations began to take root while she embraced volunteering, philanthropy and activism: she was nominated by the party "Fair Russia" to the State Duma of the 6th convocation, and had been registered. She later unsuccessfully ran in the 2013 Moscow mayoral election on behalf of the Civilian Power party, as she was denied registration. In 2014, she ran in the elections to the Moscow City Duma of the 6th convocation, and was registered.

In the fall of 2018, Popova launched the Ethics and Technology project, which aims to develop reasonable boundaries and methods for using technology so that it serves society and does not cause harm. Concerned about privacy violations, on 7 October 2019 Popova filed a lawsuit against the Moscow government for violating privacy rights by using facial recognition cameras to identify anti-Kremlin protesters. The hearing was scheduled for 21 October The court ruled that the implementation didn't violate such action on 3 March 2020.

Popova joined the Yabloko party and in September 2021, again ran for the State Duma elections on a platform of strengthening domestic violence laws. Her bid for the Preobrazhensky constituency was unsuccessful, as she received 6.92% percent of the votes. She continues to advocate women running for political office in order to address current issues in Russia.

On 6 October 2022, the Ministry of Justice of Russia added Popova to the register of individuals and foreign agents.
