= Alexandra Mitroshina =

Russian writer, radio host, and blogger

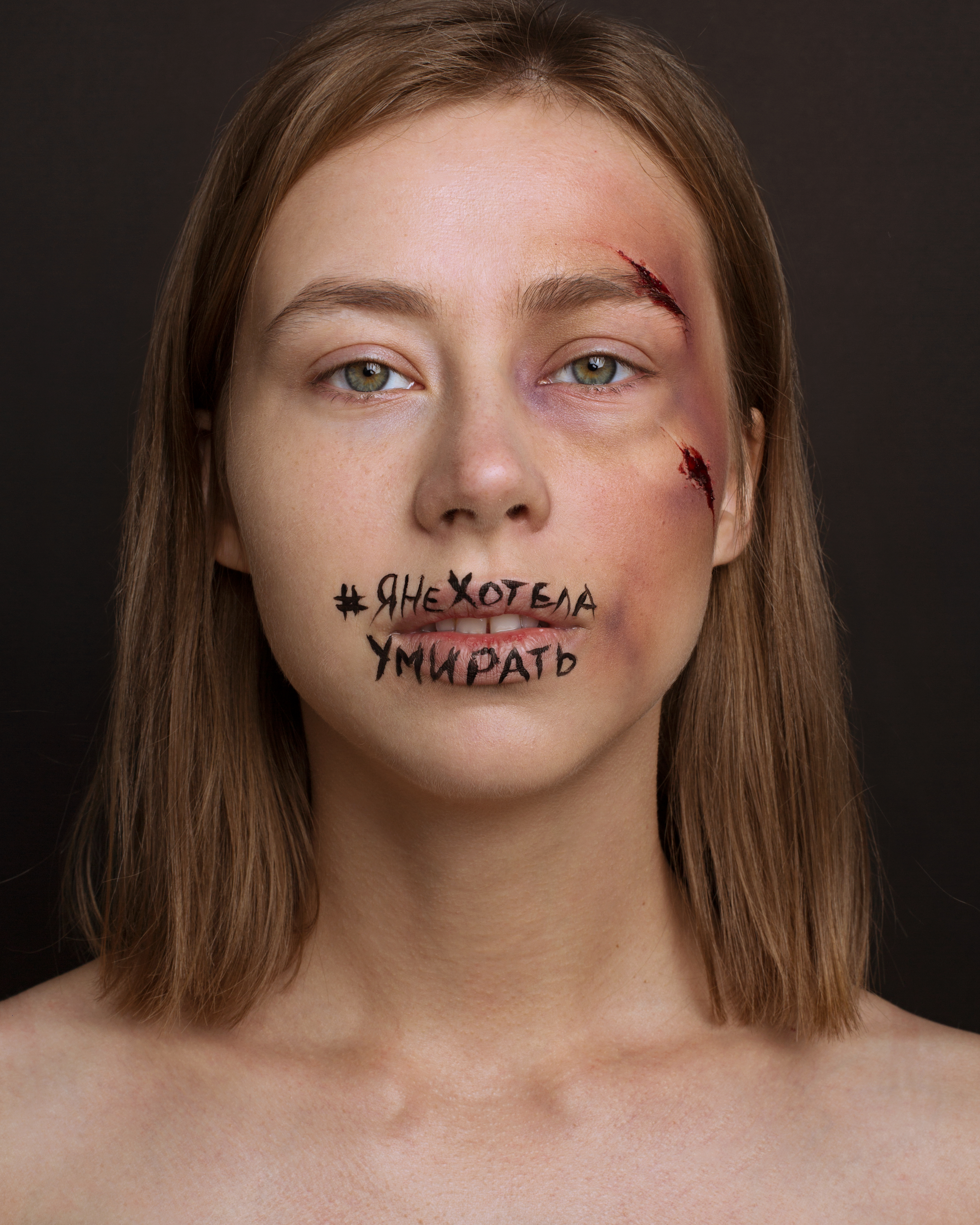
- Born: Aleksandra Aleksandrovna Mitroshina
- Years active: 2013-

Alexandra Alexandrovna Mitroshina (Russian: Александра Александровна Митрошина, born 27 June 1994 in Petrozavodsk), also known as Sasha Mitroshina, is a Russian public figure, writer, journalist, radio host and blogger. She is mostly known as one of founders (together with Alyona Popova) of a social media flash mob against domestic violence in Russia "I did not want to die" (#ЯНеХотелаУмирать).

== Biography ==
In 2015, Mitroshina graduated from the MSU Faculty of Journalism of Moscow State University, and later from the Department of Communications, Media and Design of the Higher School of Economics in Moscow. Later, she worked and published at Mail.Ru and worked on Radio Moscow FM.

Mitroshina appeared on Instagram in 2016. She now has a blog with more than four million subscribers. Initially being a non-political blogger, Alexandra launched, together with another activist, Alyona Popova, a flash mob "I did not want to die" (hashtag #ЯНеХотелаУмирать) to support women's protests against recent laws which decriminalized domestic violence in Russia.
