= Alexander Romanovich =

Russian politician (1952–2026)

- Александр Романович
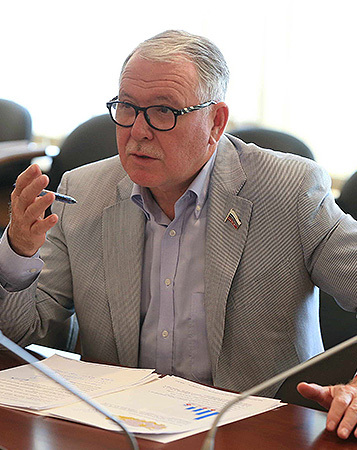

Member of the State Duma
- In office 15 December 2011 – 5 October 2016

Personal details
- Born: 15 October 1952 Moscow, Russian SFSR, Soviet Union
- Died: 11 August 2026 (aged 73)
- Party: A Just Russia
- Education: Military Institute of the USSR Ministry of Defence (DS)
- Occupation: Military officer

Alexander Leonidovich Romanovich (Russian: Александр Леонидович Романович; 15 October 1952 – 11 August 2026) was a Russian politician. A member of A Just Russia, he served in the State Duma from 2011 to 2016.

Romanovich died on 11 August 2026, at the age of 73.
