= Nikolai Vorobyov =

Nikolai Vorobyov may refer to:

- Nikolai Nikolayevich Vorobyov (mathematician) (1925–1995), Soviet and Russian mathematician
- Nikolai Vasilievich Vorobyov (born 1960), Russian football coach and former player
- Nikolai Vorobyov (politician)
