= Grigory Vorobiev =

Russian doctor and sports medicine pioneer

Grigory Petrovich Vorobiev (Russian: Григорий Петрович Воробьёв; December 29, 1929 – November 22, 2019) was one of the pioneers of Sports Medicine in Russia. A long time doctor (1959–1996) for the USSR / Russian National Athletics Team, he is best known for developing a concept of "weak" links in athlete's locomotor system. His patients include hundreds of elite athletes; Olympic, World and European champions in Track & Field and numerous other sports. Some of the well known names are: Sergey Bubka (pole vaulter), Vasiliy Alekseyev (weight lifter), Mikhail Voronin (gymnast), Ludmila Belousova / Oleg Protopopov (pair skating), Ekaterina Maximova / Vladimir Vasiliev (Bolshoi Ballet)

Dr. Vorobiev was a founding member of the IAAF Medical Committee and served as a chairman of the Medical Committee of Russian Athletics.

== Biography ==
Dr. Vorobiev was born on December 29, 1929, in Tatarstan, Russia. Early in life, he lost his father in a construction site accident and was raised by his mother. He survived devastating starvation during and post- World War II. He worked through high school to support the family and enrolled in Leningrad Medical Institute in 1947 to study medicine. During his medical studies, he developed an interest in a variety of sports, including basketball. In 1952–53 he played center on the Soviet Development Basketball Team coached by Alexander Gomelsky.

After graduating from medical school in 1953, Dr. Vorobiev started his professional career in the Arkhangelsk Region of Russian North. During that time he enrolled in Leningrad Institute of Physical Education. After receiving his Master of Education degree in 1956, he joined the Moscow region Army Club in 1956 as a sports doctor.

In 1959 Dr. Vorobiev was invited to work for the USSR Ministry of Sports. A new position of physician/coach was created to facilitate a more effective preparation of elite athletes. Dr. Vorobiev held this position with the National Athletic Team for 37 years. By the early 1970s the medical staff grew to five full-time physicians and eight massage therapists, with him becoming a Chief Doctor

He worked closely with athletes and the coaching staff on the sports techniques and developing specific training programs while being responsible for the overall health of the athletes. He constantly traveled with the team for training sessions and competitions.

He headed medical services for the entire Soviet Delegation during 1968 Summer Olympics in Mexico, 1980 Winter Olympics in Lake Placid and 1976 Summer Olympics in Montreal. Numerous times he was an IAAF medical delegate for large Athletic events. He received his Ph.D. in the area of foot biomechanics.

He was interviewed by New York Times before the 2016 Olympics about Russian doping programs. Dr. Vorobiev denies State sponsored steroid initiatives during his tenure as Head Team Doctor that ended after 1996 Atlanta Olympics. He states that doping use was grass roots in nature, initiated by individual athletes and their coaches. People such as Dr. Sergei Portugalov via his position as head of Biochemical Laboratories of the Ministry of Sports, aided this new black market of performance-enhancing steroids. The promise of results via illicit gains allowed many of those in power to turn their heads. After many years of resisting Sergei Portugalov's efforts to introduce steroid use within the Soviet athletic program, Dr. Vorobiev was fired for alleged cooperation with IAAF for providing the formula for supplement called Phenotropil. Sergei Portugalov linked this act with disqualification Russian race walker medalist in his memo to the Ministry of Sport. The dismissal of Grigory Vorobiev as Head Doctor enabled Portugalov easier access to athletes and coaches that was previously safeguarded by Dr. Vorobiev. Later on the Court of Arbitration for Sports (CAS) suspended Dr Sergei Portugalov for life for supplying athletes with banned substances.

Dr. Vorobiev became actively involved in junior and children's sport. He frequently lectured and gave speeches on preventative medicine and high performance training. He consulted individual athletes, sports enthusiasts and patients e.g. Mikhail Youzhny (tennis), Anastasia Volochkova (ballerina).

He moved to the United States in 2011 to be close to his son's family. He died at his home in Chicago in November 2019.

== Awards ==
- Recipient of two government medals for Work Excellence. Holds a title of Distinguished Physician of The Russian Federation
