= Ivan Vorobyov =

Ivan Vorobyov may refer to:

- Ivan Alekseevich Vorobyov (1921-1991), Soviet air force commander, twice Hero of the Soviet Union
- Ivan Dmitrievich Vorobyov (1789-1851), shipbuilder of the Russian Empire, Mayor General
- Ivan Ivanovich Vorobyov (1908-1967), Soviet military commander, Hero of the Soviet Union
- Ivan Petrovich Vorobyov (born 1988), Russian judoka
