= All-Russian Academy of Foreign Trade =

Coordinates: 55.7270°N 37.5340°E

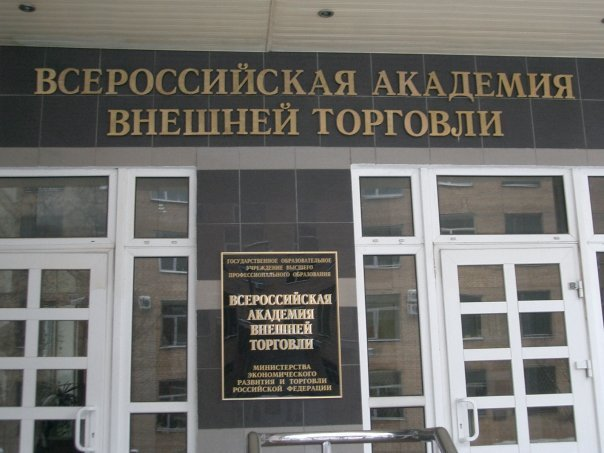
- Type: Public
- Established: 1931
- Location: Vorobyovskoye 6a 119285 Moscow, Moscow, Russia
- Website: www.vavt.ru

All-Russian Academy of Foreign Trade of the Ministry of Economic Development of the Russian Federation (RFTA) (Russian: Всероссийская академия внешней торговли Министерства экономического развития Российской Федерации, ВАВТ Минэкономразвития России) is the only university which is subordinate to the Ministry of Economic Development of Russia.

For more than 90 years, RFTA has been training professionals for foreign economic activity. Graduates of the Academy become specialists in the field of international trade, international finance and international economic law.

In 2015, in accordance with the decree of the president of Russia, the Academy was assigned to the leading universities that have the right to develop and approve educational standards for all levels of higher education independently. Since 2016, the main programs of the Academy have been implemented according to its own educational standards in the following areas of training: economics, management, law (bachelor's degree, master's degree, postgraduate studies), state municipal administration (bachelor's degree), advanced training programs and professional retraining programs.

== History ==
=== Soviet period ===
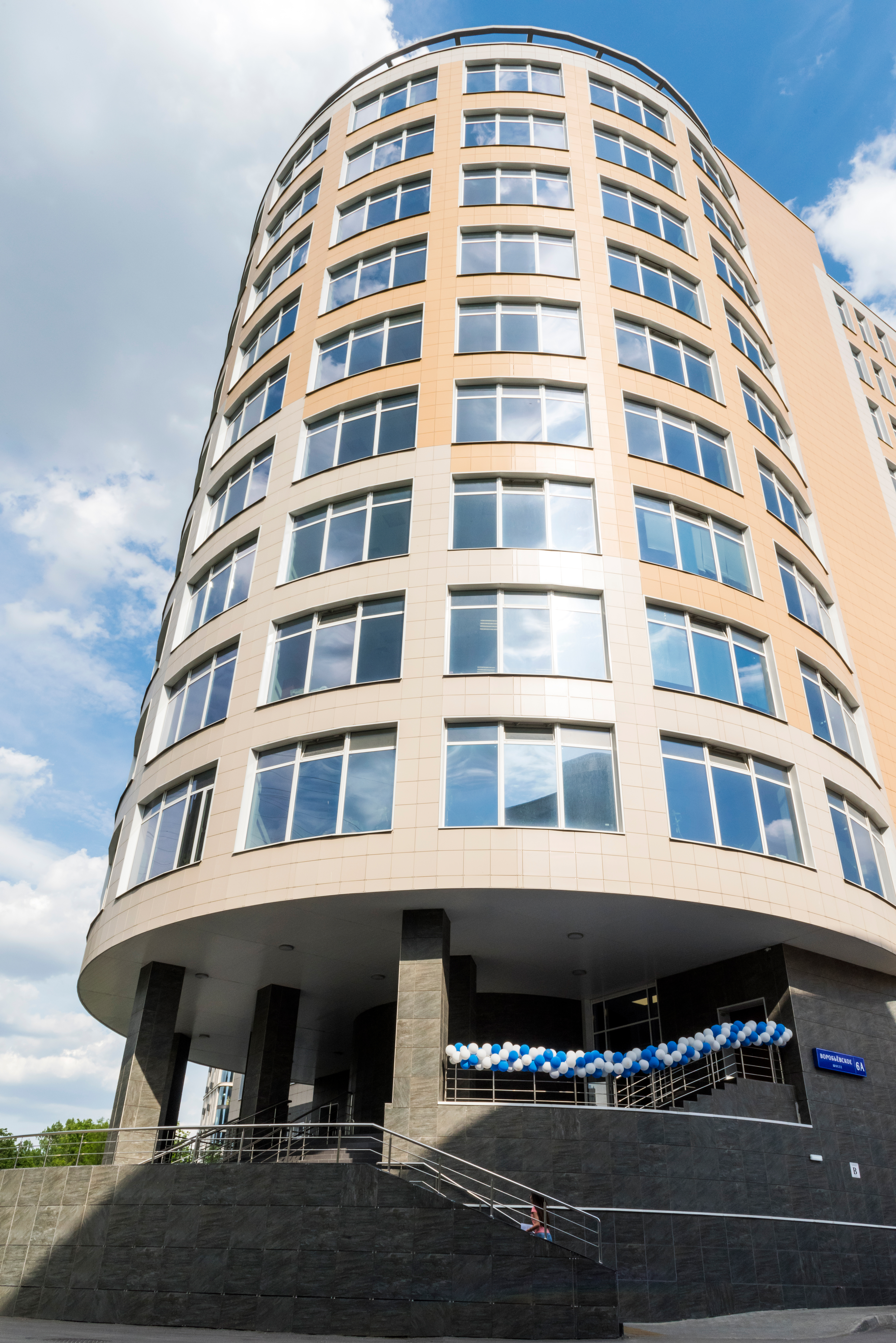

The All-Union Academy of Foreign Trade was founded in 1931 to train executives and specialists in the field of foreign trade with the direct participation of Anastas Mikoyan, who then held the post of People's Commissar of Foreign and Domestic Trade of the USSR, and later — People's Commissar of Supply. The Academy was subordinate to the Council of People's Commissars of the USSR. The first director of the Academy (1931-1937) was Stokowski Marian Ludwikovich. In 1939, the Academy was granted the status of a higher educational institution for training individuals with higher education in the speciality "International Economic Relations". In 1964, in addition to the Faculty of Foreign Trade Economists, the Faculty of International Economists (FIE) was created at the Academy to train personnel for work in international organizations of the UN system. In 1969, the Faculty of Advanced Training began operating at the Academy, which in the 1980s was transformed into the Institute for Advanced Training and later became the main base for the creation of the Moscow Institute of International Business. In 1973, the Faculty of Foreign Economic Relations was established at the Academy, training personnel to participate in programs of economic and technical assistance of the USSR to foreign countries. In 1988, a postgraduate program was opened and the Council for the Defense of Candidate Dissertations was created. In 1990, the International Commercial Faculty (ICF) was created on the basis of the Faculty of Foreign Trade Economists and the Faculty of Foreign Economic Relations.

=== Modern period ===
In 1992, following the dissolution of the Soviet Union the Academy was renamed the All-Russian Academy of Foreign Trade. In 1994, in connection with the introduction of a new classifier of specialties, the Academy switched to training in the specialty of "World Economy". In accordance with the adoption of the "Regulations on the Federal Civil Service", the Academy began training civil servants involved in issues of foreign economic activity management and the development of international economic and scientific-technical cooperation at the federal and regional levels. The Faculty of State and International Foreign Economic Service was created on the basis of the Faculty of International Economists. In 1994, the Far Eastern branch of VAVT was opened in Petropavlovsk-Kamchatsky.

In 1996, the academy began training in the speciality Global Economy on the basis of complete secondary education in full-time and evening forms of study. The student Faculty of International Economists was created. In 1996, the faculty of professional retraining and advanced training of specialists with higher education for work in the field of foreign economic activity was created. The faculty of bachelors in the areas of "Management" and "Economics" was created. In the direction of "Economics", full-time and external studies began. In 1997, the Academy received a license to open the speciality of Jurisprudence. The International Law Faculty] (ILF) was formed, training of students on the basis of higher education (evening department) began. In 1999, training on the basis of complete secondary education (daytime department) began at the ILF. In 2000, the Academy began to implement professional retraining under the Master of Business Administration (MBA) program. A Council for the Defense of Doctoral Dissertations was created. In 2001, admission to the Faculty of Foreign Trade Management was opened in the Management program with full-time and external studies.

== Structure ==
The structure of the RFTA includes:

- five faculties: Faculty of International Economists (FIE), Faculty of International Finance (FIF), Faculty of Foreign Trade Management (FFTM), Faculty of International Law (FIL) and Faculty of International Business (FIB).
- seven research units: the Institute of International Economics and Finance, the Council for the Study of Productive Forces, the Center for Financial Monitoring, the Institute for Macroeconomic Research, the center for the development of program-oriented management, the Institute for the Development of Integration Processes, the center for data Analysis.
- higher courses of foreign languages

The Academy teaches the 11 following languages:

- Arabic
- Chinese
- English
- French
- German
- Hindi
- Italian
- Korean
- Portuguese
- Spanish
- Turkish

The curriculum of the bachelor's degree programs of the Academy provides for the compulsory study of two foreign languages, students begin to study the second foreign language from the second year. The Academy assists students in finding a place to practice as part of the educational process, as well as in subsequent employment. Graduates of RFTA, having received a high-quality education in the field of foreign economic activity, work in federal executive bodies, federal services, state corporations, trade representative offices, as well as large private Russian and foreign companies and hold senior positions in them.

Thanks to extensive international contacts, students have the opportunity to study under two-degree programs or to complete internships at universities in China, France, Germany, Great Britain, Italy, Kazakhstan, Mexico, South Korea, Spain, Turkey and other countries.

The Academy is a co-founder of two international network universities: the Russian-French University (founded in 2016) and the Alliance of Russian and Spanish Universities (founded in 2019). RFTA is a member of the Russian-Chinese Association of Economic Universities (since 2021).

== Campus ==
RFTA Campus is formed by a number of educational and administrative buildings.

10-storey educational building (6A Vorobiovskoe Shosse) with spacious lecture and seminar rooms, fully equipped language laboratories. All rooms are equipped audio and video equipment. A conference hall for 164 seats. Equipped computer classes on the 9th floor. A refectory and a cafe on the 1st floor. Two level parking lot for 130 cars.

Dormitory A new 6-storey at 4A Pudovkina Street which houses a new dormitory of the Academy and it was put into operation in 2020.

RFTA Library In 2020, a new library building with comfortable reading rooms and a café, located at 8 bldg. 2 Vorobiovskoe Shosse was put into operation.

Sports and Recreation Center (SOK) 4-storey Sports and Recreation Center is located at 4A bldg.1 Pudovkina Street.

Medical center / Student Health Care The Medical Center is open daily, 7 days a week at 4A, bldg.1 Pudovkina Street.

== Rankings ==
In 2021, RFTA took the third place among Russian universities with an enrollment of less than 300 people in terms of the average Unified State Exam score for budget places and the eighth place for extra–budgetary places.

According to the level of salaries of young professionals in the "Superjob for students" rating, RFTA ranks third in the field of Economics and Finance and ninth in the legal field.

According to the level of demand for graduates, according to the hh.ru 2020 – 2021, graduates of the Law Faculty of the Academy occupy the third place among graduates of Moscow law faculties.

== Sources ==
- Official website
- English version of the website
