= Gleb Fetisov =

Cypriot entrepreneur, film producer, and philanthropist

Gleb Fetisov

Gleb Fetisov (Greek: Γκλεμπ Φετίσοφ; born 5 June 1966) is an entrepreneur investor, film producer with twice Oscar-nominated movie productions, philanthropist. He holds a PhD and is a professor of economics and finance, former member of the Federation Council for the Voronezh Region (2001—2009) and former chair of Green Alliance party (2012—2015). He is no longer a Russian citizen, and is instead a citizen of Cyprus, where he resides.

== Film production ==
Film producer Gleb Fetisov's works include “Some Like It Cold” (2014); “Chef” (2014) directed by Jon Favreau, starring Dustin Hoffman, Scarlett Johansson, Robert Downey Jr, Sofia Vergara; “The Duelist” (2016) directed by Alexey Mizgirev; “Loveless” (Non-Stop Production and Fetisoff Illusion, 2017) directed by Andrey Zvyagintsev and awarded the Jury Prize at the Cannes Film Festival, the César Award, the Grand Prix at the BFI London Film Festival; a WW2 drama “Sobibor” (2018, Cinema Production, Fetisoff Illusion) starring Konstantin Khabensky and Christopher Lambert; “Tripping in Mexico” (2019); “Iron Mask” (2019) fantasy starring Jackie Chan and Arnold Schwarzenegger (the only fight scene in the history of cinema between these two movie stars); “The Piper” (2022) a horror film based on the medieval legend of the Pied Piper, starring Liz Hurley; “Long Day's Journey into Night” based on the eponymous play by Eugene O'Neill starring Jessica Lange, Ed Harris and Ben Foster (to be released in 2023). “Loveless” was nominated and “Sobibor” was selected for Oscar in the Best Foreign Language Film category in 2018 and in 2019 “Sobibor” was also shown at the United Nations Headquarters in New York. Gleb Fetisov is a member of the Producers Guild of America. He founded Fetisoff Illusion (Europe) – a European film production company.

== Philanthropy ==
At the end of 2019 the Fetisov Charitable Foundation (based in Geneva, Switzerland) established the largest journalism awards in the world – Fetisov Journalism Awards to recognize and reward outstanding journalists across the globe for their selfless work and contribution to the promotion of universal human rights as well as positive impact on human society.

== Persecution ==
On 28 February 2014, Fetisov was arrested by the Russian Investigative Committee on suspicion of fraud as part of criminal investigation into the bankruptcy of My Bank.

Later in 2014, the European Parliament included Gleb Fetisov in the resolution on Russia as «the leader of an opposition party and movement that was persecuted by the Russian authorities».

In December 2015, he resigned from his position at the Green Alliance Party and withdrew from politics. In 2015, the U.S. Department of State included Gleb Fetisov in the list of persons under “politically motivated unfounded criminal prosecution” in their home country.

In May 2017, the London Court of International Arbitration declared Gleb Fetisov not responsible for the bankruptcy of My Bank.
