= Altimo =

- Company type: Private
- Industry: Private Equity
- Predecessor: Alfa
- Founded: 2004; 22 years ago
- Headquarters: Moscow, Russia; London, England
- Key people: Alexey M. Reznikovich, CEO
- Total assets: $35 billion
- Website: www.altimo.org and

Altimo (alt. Alfa Telecom International Mobile) is the telecommunications investment arm of Russia's Alfa Group Consortium, controlled by Russian oligarch Mikhail Fridman. Altimo investee companies operate in Russia, Ukraine, Kazakhstan, Uzbekistan, Kyrgyzstan, Tajikistan, Bangladesh, Georgia, Turkey; it holds stakes in VimpelCom, MegaFon, Kyivstar, and Turkcell. Together, Altimo's investee companies have more than 150 million mobile phone subscribers. . Altimo Holdings & Investments Ltd. is a British Virgin Islands company. A majority of its shares are owned by CTF Holdings, a Gibraltar limited liability company, whose sole shareholder is Crown Finance Foundation, a Liechtenstein foundation.

Since its formation in 2004, Altimo has been involved in numerous conflicts with all its main partners in each of the four companies which form the backbone of its investments. These conflicts have resulted in what Judge Lynch of the United States District Court, Southern District of New York described as a "brazen history of collusive and vexatious litigation . . . used to avoid compliance with their legal obligations".

In November 2005, Altimo acquired a 13.2% stake in Turkcell, the largest Turkish mobile phone operator. This acquisition was the subject of considerable controversy due to doubt whether the Turkish Group Cukurova was in violation of a shareholders agreement it had in place with TeliaSonera, the other major shareholder in Turkcell. Altimo was also engaged in a dispute with TeliaSonera over MegaFon at the time of this transaction.

In July 2007, Altimo and the Bermuda-based IPOC International Growth Fund, which was closely associated with Jeffrey Galmond and Leonid Reiman, settled their disputes agreeing to Altimo's ownership of the 25% stake in MegaFon that was previously held by Leonid Rozhetskin's LV Finance.

Altimo's efforts (2008) to expand into India met with a rebuff when the home ministry observed that Altimo and its parent company, Alpha, have a "tainted background".

In April 2010 it was reported that "Altimo" package of MegaFon shares was pledged by Vnesheconombank. They have become the provision of $1.5 billion loan instead of the 44% stake in VimpelCom. The change of pledge has been needed for the formation of capital Vimpelcom Ltd.
