= Green Alliance (Russia) =

Green Alliance Альянс зелёных
- Leader: Alexander Zakondyrin
- Founders: Oleg Mitvol; Gleb Fetisov
- Founded: 24 April 2012
- Dissolved: 2 October 2019
- Headquarters: 1st Building, Partiynyy Lane, Moscow, Russia. 115093
- Ideology: Grassroots democracy Green politics Social democracy
- Political position: Centre-left
- National affiliation: All-Russia People's Front (2015–2019)
- International affiliation: European Greens (2012–2015)
- Colours: Green
- Slogan: "Everyone is fighting for power - we are fighting for life" (Russian: "Все борются за власть — мы боремся за жизнь")

Website
- russian-greens.ru

The Green Alliance (Russian: Альянс зелёных; Alyans zelonykh), in 2012–2014 Alliance of Greens — People’s Party (AGPP; Russian: Альянс зелёных — Народная партия; АЗНП; Alyans zelonykh — Narodnaya partiya, AZNP), in 2014–2015 Alliance of Greens and Social Democrats (AGSD; Russian: Альянс зелёных и социал-демократов; АЗСД; Alyans zelonykh i sotsial-demokratov, AZSD) was a Russian political party based on Oleg Mitvol's Green Alternative movement (founded in 2009) and founded in 2012 as a party. The party was headed by Alexander Zakondyrin.

The party was originally founded by a Russian billionaire Gleb Fetisov and Oleg Mitvol. Gleb Fetisov left the party chairmanship and exited the party in December 2015.

On 25 January 2014, the Gleb Fetisov-led Alliance of Greens — People’s Party united at their 3rd congress with four almost unknown parties of Gennady Gudkov’s Social Democrats of Russia, Freedom and Justice, Kolokol (“bell”) and the Party of Free Citizens. Gennady Gudkov and Gleb Fetisov became co-chairmen of the Alliance of Greens and Social Democrats. Oleg Mitvol became the chairman of the alliance’s central council. Gleb Fetisov, Dmitry Gudkov, Ilya Ponomarev, Elena Lukyanova, Dmitry Nekrasov and others became the members of the party's council.

On 12 December 2015, after a party coup at the December Congress, a member of the Public Chamber of Moscow Alexander Zakondyrin was elected the party chairman. The name of the party was changed from the Alliance of Greens and Social Democrats to Green Alliance. The positions of co-chairmen were abolished.

On 2 October 2019, the Supreme Court of Russia, following a lawsuit by the Ministry of Justice, liquidated the party for insufficient participation in the elections for seven years.

== Ideology ==
According to their website, they believe in:

- Sustainable development and new quality of life for Russian citizens
- Environmental protection
- Non-violence
- Grassroots democracy
- Social justice
