= Governor of Moscow Oblast =

Highest-ranking official in Moscow Oblast, Russia

- Губернатор Московской области
- Coat of Arms of Moscow Oblast

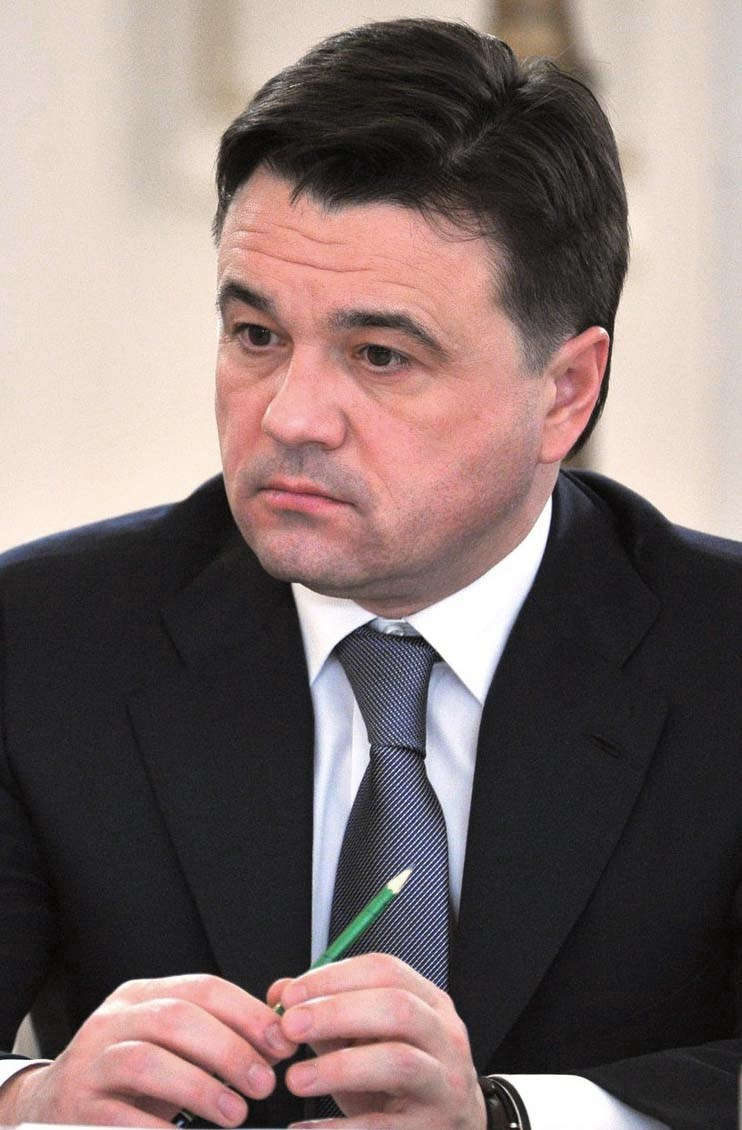
- Incumbent; Andrey Vorobyov since 8 November 2012
- Residence: The Government House, Krasnogorsk
- Term length: 5 years, renewable once
- Inaugural holder: Anatoly Tyazhlov
- Formation: 1995
- Website: Governor of Moscow Oblast

The Governor of Moscow Oblast (Russian: Губернатор Московской области) is the governor of Moscow Oblast, a federal subject of Russia.

The governor is the highest-ranking official and head of administration of the government of Moscow Oblast, and is elected for a five-year term that is renewable once consecutively.

The current governor is Andrey Vorobyov of United Russia who took office on 8 November 2012.

== History ==
Until 1995 the head of the Moscow Oblast was titled the Head of Administration of Moscow Oblast. In 1995, the Regional Duma adopted the new law about the Governor of Moscow Oblast, and since 1995, the head of the Oblast is titled Governor.

On 17 December 1995, elections for the governor of Moscow were held. Anatoly Tyazhlov, the head of administration, won the elections in the second round. The next elections for the governor and vice-governor of the Moscow Region were held on 19 December 1999 with the second round on 9 January 2000. State Duma deputy Boris Gromov (Fatherland bloc) was elected Governor of Moscow Oblast for a term of four years. In April 2001, the term of office of the governor was extended from 4 to 5 years. In December 2003 Gromov was re-elected with 83% of the vote.

In December 2004, at the initiative of President Vladimir Putin, the gubernatorial elections by direct popular vote were replaced by appointment by the legislative bodies on the presidential proposal. In May 2007 Boris Gromov was appointed for a third term. On 4 April 2012, Minister of Emergency Situations Sergey Shoigu was proposed by the United Russia party as a candidate for the governor. On April 5, Shoigu's candidacy was unanimously supported by the Moscow Oblast Duma. He took office on 11 May 2012.

On 8 November 2012, Russian President Vladimir Putin appointed Andrey Vorobyov as interim governor of Moscow Oblast. Two days earlier, Sergey Shoigu, who had been in charge of the region for only six months, was appointed Russian defence minister. For the next ten months Vorobyov remained acting governor, since from 2012 all regional and local elections in Russia are scheduled for September. On 9 September 2013, Vorobyov was elected fourth governor of the region, having received 78.94% of the votes.

== List of officeholders ==
№	Portrait	Name	Tenure	Time in office	Party	Election
1		Anatoliy Tyazhlov (1942–2008)	16 October 1991 – 2 February 2000 (lost re-election)	8 years, 109 days	Independent	Appointed 1995
1		Anatoliy Tyazhlov (1942–2008)	16 October 1991 – 2 February 2000 (lost re-election)	8 years, 109 days	Our Home – Russia	Appointed 1995
—		Vasily Golubev (born 1957)	19 November 1999 – 2 February 2000	75 days	Independent	Acting for Tyazhlov
2		Boris Gromov (born 1943)	2 February 2000 – 11 May 2012 (term end)	12 years, 99 days	Fatherland – All Russia	1999–2000; 2003; 2007
2		Boris Gromov (born 1943)	2 February 2000 – 11 May 2012 (term end)	12 years, 99 days	United Russia	1999–2000; 2003; 2007
3		Sergei Shoigu (born 1955)	11 May 2012 – 6 November 2012 (resigned)	179 days	United Russia	2012
—		Ruslan Tsalikov (born 1956)	6 November 2012 – 8 November 2012	2 days	United Russia	Acting
—		Andrey Vorobyov (born 1970)	8 November 2012 – 14 September 2013	13 years, 303 days	United Russia	Acting
4		Andrey Vorobyov (born 1970)	14 September 2013 – present	13 years, 303 days	United Russia	2013; 2018; 2023

== Latest election ==
The latest election for the office, the 2023 Moscow Oblast gubernatorial election, was held on 8–10 September 2023.

== See also ==
- Moscow Regional Committee of the Communist Party of the Soviet Union - the party head was de facto governor
