= Maksim Vorobyov (businessman) =

Russian businessman and investor (born 1976)

- Education: Moscow State Institute of International Relations
- Occupations: Businessman; investor

Maksim Yuryevich Vorobyov (Russian: Максим Юрьевич Воробьёв; born 9 August 1976 in Krasnoyarsk) is a Russian businessman and investor.

== Education ==
In 1998 Vorobyov graduated from the Moscow State Institute of International Relations (Economics Faculty). In 2006, he received his MBA degree from IESE Business School.

== Career and business ==
In 1997, he founded the Russian Sea LLC (which imports herring and mackerel from Norway) together with his brother. He chose to start from the bottom rung of the corporate ladder in order to penetrate deeply into all aspects of the business, and began working at his own company as a Sales Manager. After the company had achieved successful results, he took a position as sales director and then executive director and CEO. In 2002 he bought out the company shares from his brother and became the company's majority owner.

With Vorobyov at the helm, the Russian Sea LLC has become one of the largest Russian processors of fish and suppliers of fish products and has demonstrated fast growth. The company built its own factory for fish processing (1999) and developed its own federal distribution chain. In addition, the company started developing an aquacultural business (2007) and fish harvesting (2011). The company completed IPO at MICEX (2010) and became the first public Russian company in its sector.

The Russian Sea company brand was named the best known in its sector in 2007 (TNS Gallup Media, III quarter of 2007), as well as in 2011 (TNS Gallup Media; OMI). In 2013 the brand “Russian Sea” was sold together with the factory, and the company focused on the aquacultural division (Russian Aquaculture PJSC) and fish harvesting (Russian Fishery Company LLC).

At the same time, Vorobyov invested in other industries, including banking, mining, construction and development. In 2015 he invested in a range of venture projects, mainly in innovative technologies and IT.
