= Andrey Vorobyov =

Russian politician (born 1970)

- Андрей Воробьёв
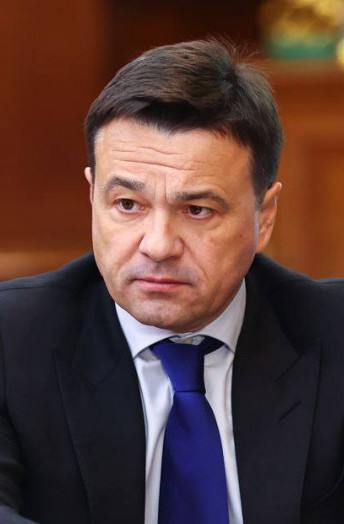
- Vorobyov in 2021

4th Governor of Moscow Oblast
- Incumbent
- Assumed office 14 September 2013
- President: Vladimir Putin
- Preceded by: Sergey Shoygu

Deputy Chairman of the State Duma
- In office 11 December 2011 – 8 November 2012
- Preceded by: Boris Gryzlov
- Succeeded by: Vladimir Vasilyev

Parliamentary leader of United Russia in the State Duma
- In office 19 December 2011 – 10 November 2012
- Preceded by: Boris Gryzlov
- Succeeded by: Vladimir Vasilyev

Head of Central Executive Committee of United Russia
- In office 23 April 2005 – 11 February 2012
- Succeeded by: Dmitry Travkin

Russian Federation Senator from the Republic of Adygea
- In office 6 March 2002 – 7 December 2003
- Preceded by: Aslan Dzharimov
- Succeeded by: Vyacheslav Shverikas

Personal details
- Born: Andrey Yurievich Vorobyov; 14 April 1970 (age 56) Krasnoyarsk, Russian SFSR, Soviet Union
- Party: United Russia (2003–present)
- Other political affiliations: CPSU (until 1991); Independent (1991–2003)
- Children: 4
- Education: North Ossetian State University; Academy of Foreign Trade; Higher School of Economics

Andrey Yuryevich Vorobyov (Russian: Андре́й Ю́рьевич Воробьёв, IPA: [ɐnˈdrʲej ˈjʉrʲjɪvʲɪtɕ vərɐˈbʲjɵf]; born 14 April 1970) is a Russian politician who is the current governor of Moscow Oblast. He has previously served as the head of United Russia's Central Executive Committee, and one of the deputy chairmen of the State Duma.

== Early life ==
Andrey Vorobyov was born on 14 April 1970, in Krasnoyarsk, Siberia. His father is Yuri Vorobyov, a founder of the Ministry of Emergency Situations of Russia, a close ally of Sergei Shoigu. His younger brother Maksim is a businessman. Andrey Vorobyov is married and has two children.

== Education ==
In 1995, Andrey Vorobyov graduated from the North Ossetian K.L. Khetagurov State University, in 1998 the All-Russian Academy of Foreign Trade. In 2006, he received his MBA degree in political and business communications at the Higher School of Economics. In 2005, he defended his thesis in economics at the Russian Academy of Public Service under the President of Russia.

== Military service ==
From 1988 to 1989, Vorobyov served in the Dzerzhinsky division, participated in operations in Baku (Azerbaijan), Yerevan (Armenia), Kokand and Ferghana (Uzbekistan).

== Business career ==
From 1991 to 1998, Vorobyov was engaged in organization and development of his own business. In 1998, he founded the Russian Sea company and directed the construction of the fish-processing plant in the Moscow region.

== Political career ==
Vorobyov joined the Russian civil service in 2000, and was an assistant to Deputy Prime Minister Sergei Shoigu. In 2002–2003, he represented the Republic of Adygea in the Federation Council. From 2000, he was a founder and president of the Interregional Public Fund for Support of the majority party United Russia.

In 2003, Vorobyov was elected a deputy of the State Duma of the Federal Assembly of the Russian Federation. From 2005 to 2012, he directed the Central Executive Committee (CEC) of the United Russia party. In 2007, he was again elected a deputy of the State Duma. In 2011, he was reelected Deputy of the State Duma of the Russian Federation. On 11 February 2012, he reported that he left his post. According to him, he resigned from the party post to concentrate on his work in the Duma.

After the appointment of the governor of Moscow Oblast, Sergei Shoigu, as Minister of Defence, Vorobyov was named by President Vladimir Putin as new acting governor of Moscow Oblast on 8 November 2012. He held his post provisionally until the next governors' elections in September 2013. He became a candidate for the office of Moscow Oblast's Governor in Gubernatorial Election and was elected on 8 September 2013, with 78 percent of the votes.

== Governor of the Moscow Region ==
On November 8, 2012, Russian President Vladimir Putin appointed Andrei Vorobyov to the post of acting Governor of the Moscow Region.

In June 2013, United Russia nominated Vorobyov as a candidate for governor of the Moscow Region. In July of the same year, Vorobyov took the initiative to seize the property of the Russian Academy of Sciences in the Moscow region.

At the end of May 2014, Russian President Vladimir Putin signed a law on local self-government, the order of which the regions regulate independently. Two days after that, the Moscow City Duma received a draft from Governor Andrey Vorobyov, according to which direct elections of mayors with real functions remained only in Reutov. In other cities, mayors will either be elected from among local deputies, or the position of city head will be removed from the executive branch, depriving it of managerial functions. In the latter case, the real power will be in the hands of the heads of districts or heads of administrations (city managers) appointed by the governor. The law also affects the interests of municipalities that do not have city status, where direct elections of their heads have also been abolished.

The law was approved in three readings in 24 hours, and representatives of United Russia refused the initiative to discuss the draft with local authorities. According to representatives of the opposition, the hasty adoption of the law is due to the municipal elections, and the authorities carried out the cutting of districts with the cancellation of the elections for political and economic reasons. Thus, direct elections were eliminated or formalized in the largest cities in terms of population and economic potential. According to political scientist Rostislav Turovsky, by this law the regional authorities refuse to have a dialogue with local elites, building a vertical and imposing centralized management.

In order to restore the forests near Moscow, which suffered from the epidemic of the bark beetle and the subsequent sanitary logging, in September 2014 Vorobyov launched the campaign "Our forest. Plant your tree».

In 2014, Vorobyov approved the governor's emergency management program, which provides for the sterilization of female stray dogs and their return to the street for free living in an urban environment. The implementation of this program is planned for the period 2014-2018. A program is being implemented with money from the regional budget by public activists and organizations fighting for animal rights.

From October 25, 2014 to April 7, 2015 and from December 21, 2020 — Member of the Presidium of the State Council of the Russian Federation.

In May 2016, at Vorobyov's initiative, a law was passed according to which the heads of urban districts and municipal districts were no longer elected, but appointed by local representative bodies.

In 2018, he sent a letter to the Minister of Culture, Medinsky, in which, on behalf of the government of the Moscow Region, he proposed amendments to the federal law "On Cultural Heritage Sites (Historical and Cultural Monuments) of the Peoples of the Russian Federation." The government of the Moscow region proposes to abandon the mandatory historical and cultural expertise of lands before the start of their development, and to recognize as objects of such expertise only those territories in which, already during the work, an object was discovered that "possesses the characteristics of an object of cultural heritage, including archaeological." According to Vorobyov, this was done in the interests of "representatives of small businesses, as well as Russian citizens, including pensioners, the disabled and large families." As noted by the Deputy Director for Science of the Institute of Archeology of the Russian Academy of Sciences, A. Engovatova, "over the past 20 years, builders have never contacted the Institute of Archaeology with a message that they had discovered valuable finds during the work.».

On September 9, 2018, he was re-elected governor of the Moscow Region, gaining 62.52% of the vote in the election.

In August 2022, Mediazona announced the decision of the regional authorities to "optimize" municipal newspapers: editorial offices will be closed, employees will be reduced, and regional newspapers will be merged into the regional edition of Podmoskovye Segodnya. The Moscow region newspapers feared losing the jobs of about 800 people, the Union of journalists of the Moscow region reported in an appeal that some of the regional editorial offices had already been liquidated with the dismissal of about 100 people. Journalists also fear that municipal newspapers will turn into template "battle sheets", from which local news will disappear along with reporters from small towns. The editors of the liquidated newspaper Lyuberetskaya Panorama addressed a farewell letter to readers, in which they stressed that they were not sure of the correctness of such a decision by the authorities.

== Criticism ==
As the head of the Central Election Commission of United Russia, Vorobyov celebrated the New Year 2009 at the Courchevel ski resort in France. According to Mila Kuzina, a journalist at the Kommersant newspaper, "Andrei Vorobyov, as soon as he realized that he had been recognized, tried to hide." At the same time, Alexey Kuznetsov, the former finance minister of the Moscow region, was in Courchevel, accused of multibillion-dollar embezzlement from the regional budget.

In 2013, Vorobyov visited the city of Zhukovsky several times, where he held meetings with voters. He firmly promised them that there would be no construction of a high-rise housing complex in the square of the central part of the city. At the same time, Vorobyov actively promoted A. P. Voityuk as the head of the city, as a person who would not allow spot construction in the city center. However, on February 24, 2014, Voityuk, already as mayor, signed a construction permit for a 22-storey three-building housing estate in Zhukovsky Square. On March 22, 2014, a rally of construction opponents was held in Zhukovsky, which gathered 2,000 people.

Vorobyov's urban planning activities are also criticized. One of his campaign promises was a "low-rise Moscow region." Andrey Vorobyov has repeatedly stated that he opposes the development of rural areas in the Moscow region. Meanwhile, after his election as governor, massive multi-storey construction continued in the region, in some cases with the approval of the Urban Planning Council of the region headed by him, which provoked protests from a number of public organizations and some residents of the region.

Vorobyov's request to Russian President Vladimir Putin to adopt a law on forest amnesty, announced on August 24, 2016, caused a great public outcry. According to environmentalists, this would make it possible to legalize the seizure of forest lands for development and use, contrary to the provisions of the Russian Forest Code.

In 2016, Vorobyov initiated a reform of local government, in which the two-tier system of government in the region (rural and urban settlements, municipal districts and urban districts) was replaced by the creation of urban districts. This was explained by the intention to reduce officials and expenses. The project was criticized for violating the law on local self-government, depriving the local population of the opportunity to control local government and concentrating resources in the centers of new administrative units. The initiative was criticized by the State Duma Committee on Federal Structure and Local Self-government, members of the Human Rights Council under the President of Russia. By March 2017, 14 municipal districts had been transformed into urban districts. Deputies of Obolensk and Serpukhov district, a number of settlements of Taldomsky district, as well as Selyatino opposed the transformation., Wereya, Aprelevka Naro-Fominsk district refused to consolidate, the population of the region organized rallies.

Since the summer of 2017, rallies have been held in a number of cities in the region (Balashikha, Volokolamsk, Klin, Sergiev Posad) for the closure of landfills and incinerators and against waste incineration, and there were demands for the governor's resignation. On March 21, 2018, during Andrei Vorobyov's visit to the Volokolamsk city hospital due to the poisoning of several dozen children, local residents greeted him and the head of the district with snowballs and shouts of "Shame", "Murderers!" and "Resign!", after which officials were forced to leave the scene accompanied by guards. On April 14, 2018, the day of Vorobyov's 48th birthday, another series of protests against the current environmental situation due to landfills took place in the Moscow region. In total, 13 cities joined the protest, in nine of them the local authorities agreed to hold rallies.

According to the results of the election of the governor of the Moscow region on September 9, 2018, in all areas where "garbage" protests took place, the result of Governor Andrey Vorobyov, who was eventually elected for a second term on that day, decreased compared to the 2013 elections. The percentage of votes for Vorobyov decreased the most in Volokolamsk, where actions were held for the closure of the Yadrovo landfill. Vorobyov received 57% less there than in 2013: if 77% of voters voted for him in the last election, now only 20%. Konstantin Cheremisov, a candidate from the Communist Party of the Russian Federation, won the victory in this area.

== Income declarations ==
According to the 2011 declaration, one of Vorobyov's children had an income of 15,892,260 rubles, while the father had 2,054,861 rubles. The spouse is not listed in the declaration. On December 7, 2012, in an interview with Kommersant FM radio station, he explained: "My wife died. Accordingly, I live with another woman, we have four children. That's all. And my daughter inherited an apartment, and, accordingly, the savings that remained.».

According to the declaration for 2015, Andrey Vorobyov earned more than 27.7 million rubles. He uses a plot of land with an area of almost 9,5 thousand square meters, an apartment building with an area of more than 976 square meters, which the governor shares with three minor children, a parking garage with an area of more than 541 m2 and a recreation room of 627.5 square meters. One of Vorobyov's minor children owns an apartment in Russia with an area of 195 m2 and received an annual income in the amount of 1 million rubles. The governor himself, according to his declaration, does not own real estate. The amount of income declared by Vorobyov is almost 2.5 times higher than his income in 2014, when he claimed income of 9.3 million rubles.

Vorobyov's declared income for 2017 was 53 million rubles, and for 2018 it was 95.7 million rubles. One of his children has an apartment with an area of 195 sq. m. Also, the income of one of the governor's children in 2017 was 4.5 million rubles, and in 2018 it was 1.2 million rubles.

In 2021, Vorobyov declared 254 million rubles, becoming the richest governor and one of the richest officials in Russia.

== Sanctions ==
He was sanctioned by the UK government on 11 March 2022 in relation to the Russo-Ukrainian War. In December 2022 the EU also sanctioned Andrey Vorobyov in relation to the 2022 Russian invasion of Ukraine. then by Canada on 19 May 2023 for being involved in Russia’s ongoing human rights violations, including the transfer and custody of Ukrainian children in Russia. For similar reasons, he is included in the UK sanctions lists. Great Britain, Switzerland, Ukraine and Australia

== Awards ==
- Order of Merit for the Fatherland, IV degree (April 4, 2015) – for labor achievements, active social activities and many years of conscientious work
- Order of Honor (June 29, 2010) – for services to lawmaking and many years of diligent work
- Medal of the Order of Merit for the Fatherland, 1st class (March 28, 2007) – for services to lawmaking, strengthening and development of the Russian statehood
- Medal "Glory of Adygea" (April 13, 2007) – for special services to the Republic of Adygea and a great contribution to improving the social conditions of the population by decree of the President of the Republic of Adygea Aslan Tkhakushinov
- Order of St. Sergius of Radonezh, II degree (July 18, 2014) – in recognition of the assistance provided to the Trinity-Sergius Lavra
- Jubilee Medal "In memory of the 100th anniversary of the restoration of the Patriarchate in the Russian Orthodox Church" (December 20, 2017) – in recognition of the assistance provided to the Trinity-Sergius Lavra
- Medal "For Contribution to Strengthening the Defense of the Russian Federation" (Ministry of Defense of Russia, 2019)
- Commendation from the President of the Russian Federation (April 14, 2020) – for his great contribution to the socio-economic development of the region and many years of diligent work
- Honorary Cup of the Ministry of Defense of the Russian Federation
- Jubilee badge of the Moscow Regional Duma "20 years of the Moscow Regional Duma" (November 14, 2013)
- Jubilee badge of the Moscow Regional Duma "20 years of the Moscow Regional Duma" (November 22, 2018)
- Fiddler on the Roof Award in the Regional Director nomination (2016))

== Family and personal life ==
Andrey Vorobyov is a widower. His first wife, Margarita, a native of Krasnoyarsk, died suddenly no later than 2010. The governor has two daughters from his first marriage. Nothing is known about his first wife, there was not a single photo of his wife on his social networks. Since 2010, in Vorobyov's income declaration in 2010, a daughter with her own income in the millions from the inheritance of her deceased mother appeared in a separate line.

His second wife (the marriage has not been officially registered), Ekaterina Yurievna Bogdasarova, is the head of the Istok Charitable Foundation, created to help children and adolescents in difficult situations. The couple has six children: Andrey Yurievich's two daughters from his first marriage, Ekaterina's two daughters from his first marriage, and two sons together, George (born in 2013) and Mikhail (born in 2014). The sons are involved in football and wrestling. One of Vorobyov's eldest daughters, Ekaterina (a graduate of the MGIMO Faculty of International Economic Relations), married MGIMO graduate Mark Pavlovich Tipikin in 2017.

On August 9, 1976, his brother, Maxim Yuryevich Vorobyov, was born. Currently, he is Chairman of the Board of Directors of the Russian Sea Group of Companies. In 1998, he graduated from the MGIMO Faculty of International Economic Relations of the Ministry of Foreign Affairs of Russia, in 2006 he completed the Global Executive MBA course at the IESE Spanish Business School, and since 2002 he has been a professional participant in the securities market (certificate from the Federal Securities Commission of Russia).
