= Dmitry Kisiev =

Russian political strategist

Dmitry Teymurazovich Kisiev
- Дмитрий Теймуразович Кисиев
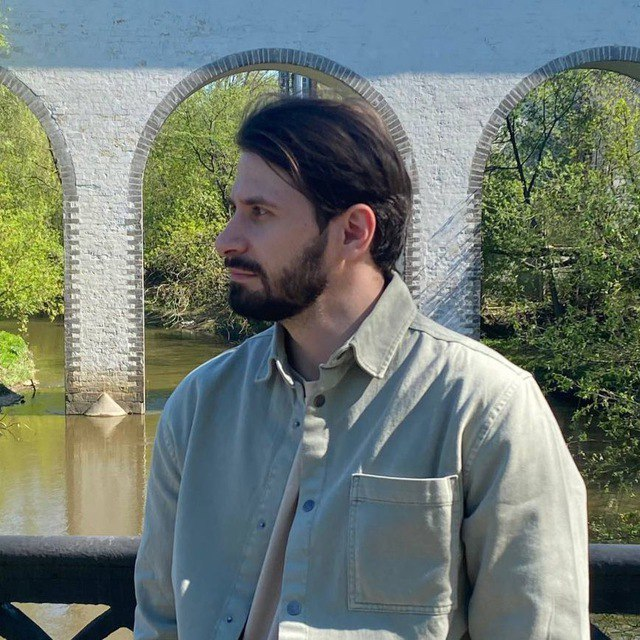
- Born: 16 June 1994 (age 32)
- Citizenship: Ukraine; Russia (2014–2025; revoked)
- Occupations: Political strategist; Lawyer
- Known for: Chief of staff for Boris Nadezhdin's 2024 presidential campaign

Dmitry Teymurazovich Kisiev (Russian: Дми́трий Теймура́зович Киси́ев born 16 June 1994) is a Russian political strategist and lawyer who served as the chief of staff for Boris Nadezhdin's 2024 presidential campaign. He gained significant public attention in July 2025 as the first Crimean native to be stripped of the Russian citizenship acquired following the annexation of the peninsula by Russia in 2014 due to political activities.

== Political activity ==
=== 2022 municipal campaign ===
In the 2022 municipal elections, the opposition support team "Shtab Kandidatov" (Candidates' Headquarters), founded by Kisiev, supported 31 candidates. Two of them were successfully elected.

=== 2023 municipal and regional campaign ===
In 2023, the "Shtab Kandidatov" project, led by Dmitry Kisiev, attempted to consolidate democratically-oriented election participants by partnering with Andrey Nechaev's Civic Initiative party. Their joint participation in the autumn 2023 regional and municipal campaigns aimed to overcome the isolation of independent candidates amid tight political control. The "Shtab" platform handled the technical aspects of the campaigns, including legal support, training, signature collection, and coordination of canvassing and fieldwork. "Civic Initiative" provided official nominations and media support. The project focused on local elections in New Moscow, the Moscow Oblast, Arkhangelsk, Belgorod, Veliky Novgorod, and several other regions where the candidates' chances were considered higher. Kisiev emphasized that despite the challenging conditions, a boycott of the elections was not considered an option, and the coalition's goal was to foster civil society and preserve the institution of independent deputies.

=== Boris Nadezhdin's presidential campaign ===
In 2023–2024, Dmitry Kisiev served as the head of the federal headquarters for the presidential campaign of Boris Nadezhdin, organizing the signature collection drive (with the plan for him to lead the entire election campaign if it was successful). He coordinated the efforts to build a network of regional headquarters and oversaw preparations for the official nomination from the Civic Initiative party, which had agreed to nominate Nadezhdin even before the campaign officially began.

According to Kisiev, by mid-November 2023, headquarters had already been launched in several regions, including Kaliningrad, Belgorod, Saint Petersburg, Tula, Veliky Novgorod, and Novosibirsk. In total, the plan was to open headquarters in 53 federal subjects. As the party was not represented in parliament, it was legally required to collect 100,000 signatures, with no more than 2,500 from any single region.

Under Kisiev's leadership, the campaign focused on engaging local democratically-minded activists, including former and current members of the Yabloko party and other opposition movements. This decentralized strategy successfully mobilized experienced and motivated teams on the ground, such as in Tula and St. Petersburg. Political analysts attributed the effectiveness of this tactic to the close-knit nature of regional activists, in contrast to the fragmentation at the federal level. Kisiev attempted to build a broad democratic coalition around Nadezhdin's candidacy.

=== 2024 Single Voting Day ===
In September 2024, Dmitry Kisiev and Boris Nadezhdin once again organized an opposition initiative, this time for the "EDG2024" project, timed for the Single Voting Day. On 4 September, they presented a public list of "alternative" candidates for various upcoming elections, including gubernatorial races, elections to the Moscow City Duma, and local elections in several regions. The list was compiled with the participation of Kisiev's "Shtab Kandidatov" team and activists from Nadezhdin's regional headquarters, which had been formed during the presidential campaign. Candidates were selected based on their political and electoral prospects, as well as their support for Nadezhdin's "Electoral Platform," which was introduced in the spring of 2024.

In addition to ideological alignment, the selection process considered concrete metrics: prior election experience, financial reports, and sociological poll results. As a result, support was extended to candidates from a wide range of parties. For the gubernatorial elections, the project recommended seven representatives from New People, six from the CPRF, five from the LDPR, and one each from the "Party of Pensioners," "Communists of Russia," and the "Greens." In 2024, fifty individuals supported by "Shtab Kandidatov" were elected as deputies in eleven regions — from Ryazan Oblast to Primorye.

=== 2025 regional campaign ===
In 2025, Dmitry Kisiev and his "Shtab Kandidatov" began collaborating with the New People party in preparation for regional elections. In January, it was announced that "Shtab" representatives had applied to participate in the party's open candidate selection process and were prepared to nominate their supporters through its platform. New People leader Alexey Nechaev stated his willingness to work with "old" liberals if they shared the values of freedom and progress. Kisiev confirmed his readiness for such cooperation, describing New People as a force that does not shy away from difficult campaigns and is capable of consistently advocating a liberal agenda within the legal framework.

According to Kisiev, after Boris Nadezhdin's presidential campaign, "Shtab Kandidatov" maintained an active network of supporters and volunteers in regions including Tomsk, Orenburg, and Nizhny Novgorod. These individuals became the main contenders for nomination, although Kisiev's structure was also open to new politicians with progressive views. He identified the main goal of the 2025 campaign as accumulating a critical mass of deputies capable of influencing the political agenda from within. The collaboration with New People was seen as a tool to reach a broader electorate and to integrate independent candidates into legal political processes.

This partnership was a logical continuation of the events of 2024, when the majority of candidates on the support list from Nadezhdin and Kisiev's "EDG2024" project were nominees from "New People." It was the only parliamentary party that officially supported the project and actively participated in the selection process. Experts believed that such situational alliances with non-systemic politicians could increase New People's visibility among the liberal electorate, albeit without guaranteeing a quick conversion of recognition into tangible support.

=== Other activities ===
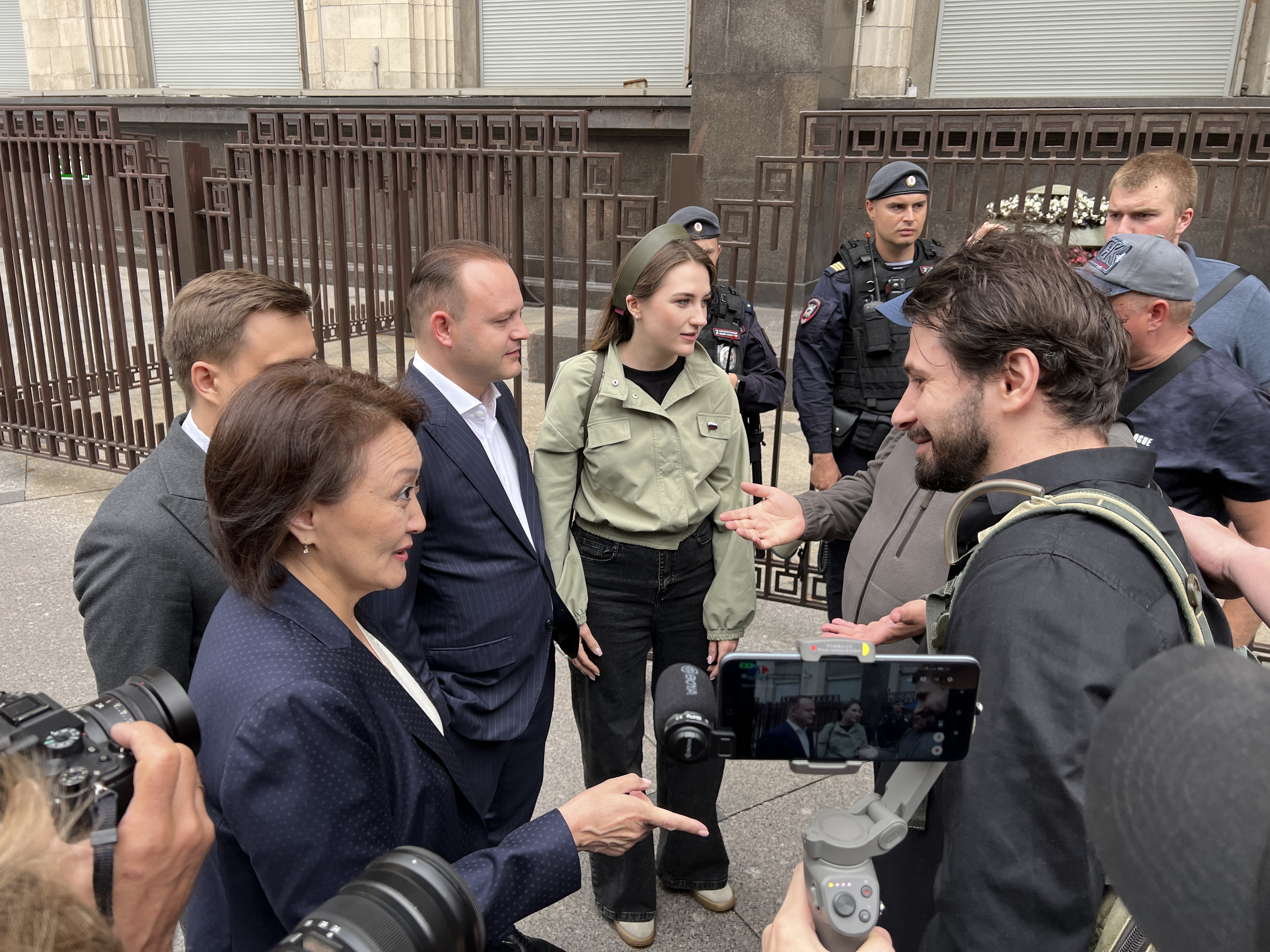
Political strategist Dmitry Kisiev talks with State Duma deputies from the New People party, including Sardana Avksentyeva and Vladislav Davankov, July 22, 2025

In April 2020, Kisiev filed two lawsuits with the Moscow City Court demanding that the restriction on freedom of movement in Moscow, imposed through digital passes during the COVID-19 pandemic, be declared illegal. He and his lawyer argued that such measures were only possible under a special regime introduced at the federal level and that Moscow's Code of Administrative Offenses contradicted federal law. One of his lawsuits was left without consideration, while the other was returned to correct formal deficiencies. According to Kisiev, some independent deputies from Moscow's municipalities were expected to join this initiative. In December 2025, Moscow's Tverskoy District Court rejected Kisiev's administrative lawsuit against the Moscow Government regarding the authorities' failure to provide clarifications on the procedure for holding public events during the COVID-19 pandemic.

In July 2025, Kisiev, together with Boris Nadezhdin, submitted a notice to hold a picket outside the State Duma in protest against a bill imposing fines for searching "extremist materials" and promoting VPN services. Despite being denied permission by Moscow authorities, Kisiev held the protest on July 22 with a banner reading "For a Russia without censorship. Orwell wrote a dystopia, not a manual," and was detained along with journalists covering the event; administrative charges were filed against several participants. On July 25, Moscow's Tverskoy Court fined Dmitry Kisiev 20,000 rubles for violating picketing rules.

On August 15, 2025, Kisiev announced on his Telegram channel plans to file a class action lawsuit challenging the blocking of calls in Telegram and WhatsApp in Russia. In December 2025, Kisiev became one of the initiators of a class action lawsuit by 42 Russians against Roskomnadzor and the Ministry of Digital Development over the blocking of calls in Telegram and WhatsApp.

== Persecution by Russian authorities ==
FSB officers breaking into Dmitry Kisiev's office

=== March 2017 detention ===
On 26 March 2017, in Simferopol, Kisiev was detained by police while on his way to a one-person picket against corruption. Kisiev's protest was part of nationwide demonstrations in response to the Anti-Corruption Foundation's investigation He Is Not Dimon to You. Three police officers detained Kisiev on Pavlenko Street and took him first to the Central District police station and then to the Zheleznodorozhny District court, where he was sentenced to ten days of administrative arrest under Article 19.3 of the Code of Administrative Offenses ("Disobedience to a lawful order of a police officer"). Kisiev called the charges baseless and announced his intention to appeal the decision through his lawyer.

The day before, activist Alexey Efremov was also detained and fined 500 rubles by the court under the same article. As a result of these detentions, the planned anti-corruption pickets in Simferopol on 26 March did not take place. Instead, representatives of United Russia held a rally at the same location. This episode was one of the first instances of open persecution of Navalny's supporters in Crimea, demonstrating the limited opportunities for civic expression in the region.

=== March 2018 search ===
In March 2018, Kisiev faced pressure from law enforcement agencies, which human rights defenders described as political persecution. On the morning of 1 March, contact with him was lost; his last message in an activist chat was: "The police are at my home." He subsequently became unreachable, causing concern among his associates. It later became known that his apartment in Dzhankoy had been searched by about 15 police officers. The official reason given was allegedly planned "provocations" by anarchists on the day of the Russian presidential election. The day before, he had been in contact with members of Pussy Riot who had come to Crimea for an action in support of Oleg Sentsov. At the same time, security forces also detained other opposition activists, including Olga Borisova and Alexander Sofeev. Law enforcement press services did not comment on the situation, and Kisiev's whereabouts remained unknown for 24 hours.

=== FSB search in March 2025 ===
On March 26, 2025, FSB officers conducted a non-public search at the office of political technologist Dmitry Kisiev, who had worked with Boris Nadezhdin and headed the "Candidates' Headquarters" (Shtab Kandidatov), involving breaking down the door.

=== Other incidents ===
On 29 May 2020, Kisiev was detained at a protest in support of journalist Ilya Azar.

=== Revocation of Russian citizenship ===
As a native of Crimea who resided on the peninsula, Dmitry Kisiev received Russian citizenship in 2014 following the annexation of the peninsula by the Russian Federation.

On 8 July 2025, in Tomsk, he was served with a notice of the potential revocation of his acquired citizenship. The basis for this action was a conclusion from the FSB's Directorate for the Protection of the Constitutional System, which stated that "the activist's actions pose a threat to national security and have a negative impact on the political and social stability of society." According to Article 22 of the Federal Law "On Citizenship of the Russian Federation" (No. 138-FZ of 28 April 2023), the decision to revoke acquired citizenship can be made by the Federal Security Service.

On July 11, Kisiev announced that he was leaving the "Shtab Kandidatov" project to allow the headquarters to continue working "under pressure." According to Kommersant, the former head of Boris Nadezhdin's headquarters in Kaluga, Konstantin Larionov, may take over leadership of the team.

On July 14, Kisiev filed a lawsuit challenging the decision to deprive him of citizenship.

On August 22, Kisiev received a notice requiring him to surrender his Russian domestic and foreign passports.

On October 3, 2025, in Khimki, security forces detained Dmitry Kisiev in a rented apartment without presenting any documents and ordered him, as a stateless person, to leave Russia within three days; Kisiev announced his intention to challenge this decision in court.

On 15 October 2025, the Supreme Court of Russia rejected an administrative lawsuit filed by Kisiev that challenged the procedure for revoking acquired Russian citizenship. The claim targeted a clause in a presidential decree, with Kisiev's legal team arguing that it created legal uncertainty by not specifying which level of the Ministry of Internal Affairs (MVD) was authorized to make the decision. An MVD representative clarified that the authority lies with its regional bodies, and the court ultimately upheld the legality of the procedure. A separate hearing, which will challenge the revocation of his citizenship itself, is scheduled at the Moscow City Court for 24 October and will be held in a closed session due to the presence of state secrets.

On 28 November 2025, the Moscow City Court, in a closed session, rejected Kisiev's lawsuit against the FSB challenging the agency's conclusion that served as the basis for revoking his citizenship. In December 2025, Kisiev's case was discussed in an interview with Valery Fadeyev, head of the Presidential Council for Civil Society and Human Rights, who noted that during wartime such measures do not violate human rights but suggested revisiting the issue after victory.
