= Oleg Haslavsky =

Russian poet, painter and translator (1948–2021)

- Олег Хаславский
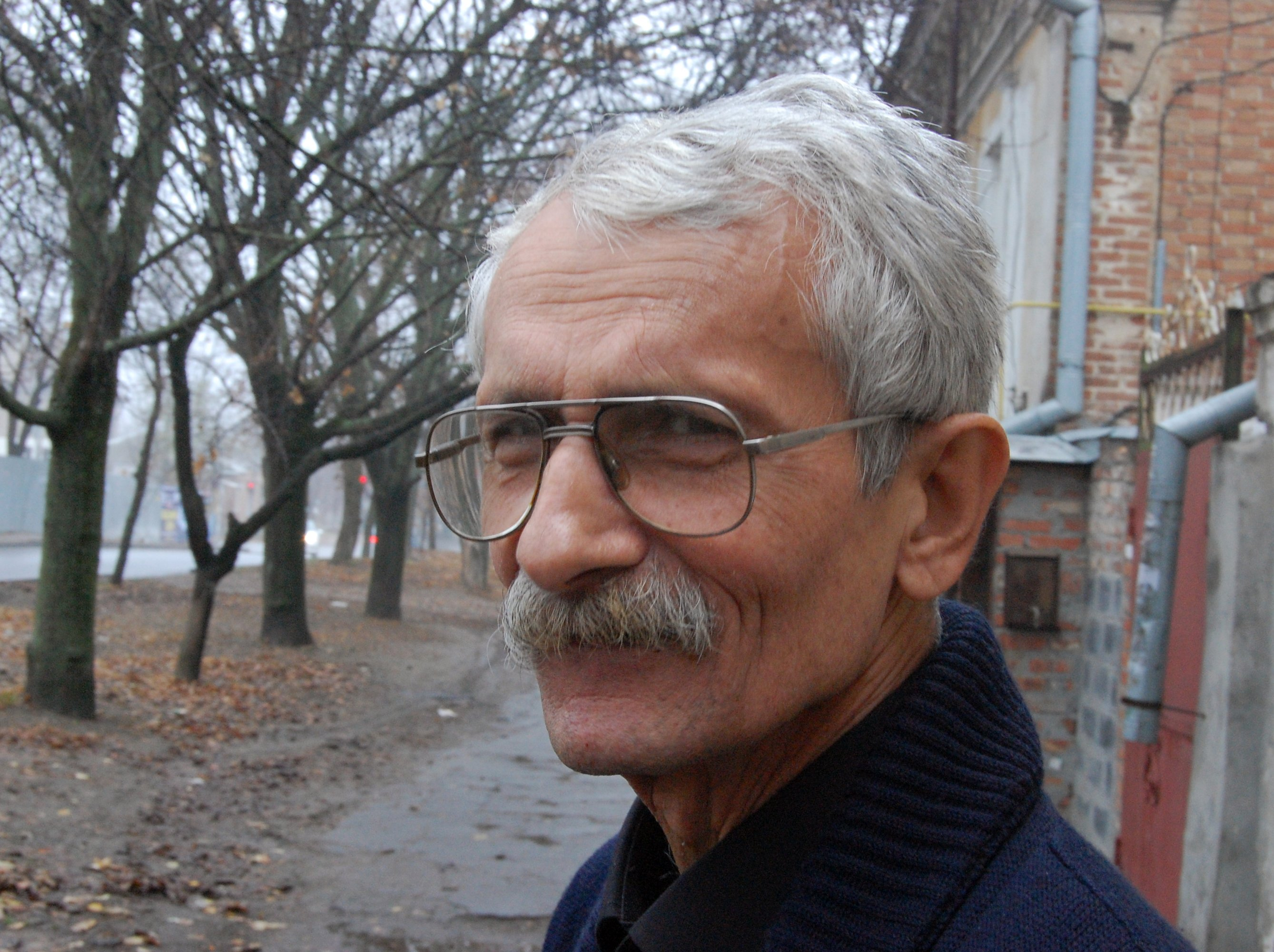
- Haslavsky in 2012
- Born: Oleg Lvovich Haslavsky; 8 July 1948; Taganrog, Russian SFSR, Soviet Union
- Died: 19 December 2021 (aged 73); Taganrog, Russia
- Education: Kolomna State Pedagogical Institute
- Occupations: Poet, translator, Painter, Psychologist

Oleg Haslavsky (Russian: Олег Львович Хаславский; 8 July 1948 – 19 December 2021) was a Russian-Israeli poet, translator, psychologist and painter.

== Biography ==
Oleg Haslavsky was born on 8 July 1948 in Taganrog, Soviet Union. Until the age of seven, he lived with his parents in Lviv. Jewish on the father's side, he was always fascinated by learning different languages and cultures, which was rather unusual in the realities of provincial, even though multinational, USSR. This linguistic and personal curiosity led him to three of his passions, namely literature, foreign languages and psychology.

During his school years he studied painting in Taganrog Art Studio under the supervision of Valentina Russo. That creative training led Oleg to choose fine-art photography and painting as his lifestyle.

In 1966, after graduating from the secondary school nr. 10, he entered the French-German department of the faculty of foreign languages of the Taganrog State Pedagogical Institute (TSPI; now: Taganrog State Pedagogical University, TSPU). This linguistic course of study became a source of inspiration and the time of formation of his own poetic vision as well as mastering the art of poetry translation.

During his university studies, his views and interests (particularly regarding the French poetry) were greatly appreciated by the docent Yury Felichkin who was teaching French in the pedagogical institute at the time. After Felichkin left the TSPI, Haslavsky was expelled from Taganrog Pedagogical Institute due to personal motives of the faculty dean. His student status was later fully reinstated, to only be transferred to the Kolomna Pedagogical Institute, where he graduated from the faculty of foreign languages in 1972. A fulfilled dream of becoming a linguist was combined with receiving a right to practice clinical psychology upon graduation.

From 1974 until 1986, Haslavsky worked as a clinical psychologist in Taganrog psychiatric clinic. From 1980 until 1982, he worked as a research scientist in the R&D Institute of the Taganrog State Radio-technical Institute (OKB "RITM"). In 1986, he became a project director in the international research centre "Delta-Inform". From 1990 until 1992, he lived in Bulgaria for research purposes. From 1999 until 2003, he lived and worked in Israel.

From 2005 until 2020, during lengthy trips to France, Germany, Austria, Switzerland and Bulgaria, he completed numerous photography, digital graphics and painting projects.

Haslavsky spoke and translated from French, English, Bulgarian, Polish, and Ukrainian. He also had a good knowledge of German and Italian. He translated various poems of François Villon, Arthur Rimbaud, Paul Verlaine, Charles Baudelaire, Guillaume Apollinaire, Maurice Maeterlinck, Konstanty Ildefons Gałczyński, Cyprian Kamil Norwid, Bolesław Leśmian, Taras Shevchenko, poetry and prose of Tadeusz Borowski, as well as Edmond Rostand's comedy Cyrano de Bergerac. In 2002, he translated Lewis Carroll's Alice's Adventures in Wonderland, which he amended in 2019.

He never sought publication of his poetry. The first representative publication took place only in 2008 in the Moscow journal Corostel. Provincial letters. After two books published in Russia, Oleg published four books in London, which, sadly, appeared already after his death. The biggest collection of Haslavsky's literary works can be found in Kaleidoscope, a mix of poetry, poetic translations and prose.

Haslavsky lived and worked in Sofia, Taganrog, as well as Haifa and Jerusalem. Oleg dedicated his whole life to his creative passions. He shared interests with his spouse Jane Haslavsky, and daughter Lana Haslavsky Madsen, with whom he wrote three books on the topics of human and artificial intelligence and psychology of creativity. He died in Taganrog on 19 December 2021, at the age of 73.

== Books by Oleg Haslavsky ==
- Олег Хаславский (Oleg Haslavsky). Избранное (Selected works). — Таганрог (Taganrog): Антон (Anthon), 2009. — 196 p. — ISBN 978-5-88040-065-2.
- Олег Хаславский (Oleg Haslavsky). Трилистник таганрогский (Taganrog's trilist). — Измаил (Izmail): Чеширский Кот (Cheshire Cat), 2010. — 32 p.
- Oleg Haslavsky. Bread and Beer / Меж призраков хлеба и кваса. — London: Counselling & Tutoring House, 2022. — 67 p. — ISBN 978-1-915380-01-2 (print book), ISBN 978-1-915380-00-5 (ebook)
- Oleg Haslavsky. Kaleidoscope / Калейдоскоп. — London: Counselling & Tutoring House, 2022. — 422 p. — ISBN 978-1-915380-08-1 (print book), ISBN 978-1-915380-09-8 (ebook).
- Oleg Haslavsky. Alice in Wonderland: Russian translation / Алиса в стране чудес. — 156 p. — London: Counselling & Tutoring House, 2022. ISBN 978-1-915380-03-6 (print book), ISBN 978-1-915380-02-9 (ebook).
- Oleg Haslavsky. Selected French Poetry in Russian translation (bilingual edition) / Избранные переводы французской поэзии (двуязычное издание). — London: Counselling & Tutoring House, 2022. ISBN 978-1-915380-05-0 (print book), ISBN 978-1-915380-04-3 (ebook).
- Lana Madsen & Oleg Haslavsky. From artificial intelligence towards artificial consciousness: When psychology finally meets technology. — London: Counselling & Tutoring House, 2022. — ISBN 978-1-915380-07-4 (print book), ISBN 978-1-915380-06-7 (ebook)
- Lana Madsen & Oleg Haslavsky. Human consciousness: Applying modern physics and mathematics to psychology. — London: Counselling & Tutoring House, 2022. — ISBN 978-1-915380-10-4 (print book), ISBN 978-1-915380-11-1 (ebook)

== Citations ==
- «A poet is a surreal entity who attempts at achieving indescribable results with means unknown to himself» — Oleg Haslavsky, 2009.
- «Living in a multi-language environment (not taking into account variations of one’s own native language) denunciates consciousness to literary existence, to a literary title, even when no single line has been written. Oleg Haslavsky is a literature figure with the initial advantage, I would even say a littérateur by default. A writing litterateur. I consciously use this definition, ‘littérateur’, though essentially one would need to talk about Haslavsky as a poet, a prose-writer, a translator (a fortiori since Oleg often works with literature pieces previously translated by very big names), and perhaps also as personality, and all of those may be referred to separately by using superlatives. But I say ‘littérateur’ referring to such an exact realisation, nowadays being so rare, of the means of consciousness existence in the language. And I would emphasize it: in the language» — Igor Burenin, 1989.
