= Boris Nadezhdin =

Russian politician (born 1963)

- Борис Надеждин
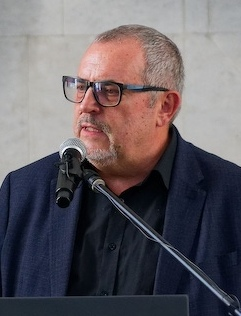
- Nadezhdin in 2024

Member of the Dolgoprudny Council of Deputies
- In office 25 September 2019 – 19 June 2024
- Parliamentary group: A Just Russia (Note: Faction leader but not a party member)
- In office February 1990 – 1997

Member of the State Duma
- In office 19 December 1999 – 29 December 2003
- Parliamentary group: Union of Right Forces

Personal details
- Born: Boris Borisovich Nadezhdin; 26 April 1963 (age 63) Tashkent, Uzbek SSR, Soviet Union (now Uzbekistan)
- Party: Independent (1991–1995, 1995–1999, 2011–2023, 2025–present)
- Other political affiliations: Democratic Reform Movement (1991); Union of Right Forces (1999–2008); Right Cause (2008–2011); Civic Initiative (2023–2025)
- Spouse: Natalia
- Children: 4
- Education: Moscow Institute of Physics and Technology (1985); Moscow State Law University (1993)
- Occupation: Politician, mathematician

Boris Borisovich Nadezhdin (Russian: Борис Борисович Надеждин; born 26 April 1963) is a Russian opposition politician. He served in the State Duma from 1999 to 2003. He was also a municipal councillor in Moscow and was considered to be a close ally of opposition politician Boris Nemtsov, who was murdered in 2015.

In November 2023, Nadezhdin announced his candidacy in the 2024 Russian presidential election. He was subsequently barred from running in the election by the Central Election Commission, which claimed to have found "irregularities" in signatures supporting his candidacy. In June 2024, days after being declared personally bankrupt by Rosenergobank, he resigned from his position as a Moscow Municipal Deputy, telling a Telegram news channel that it was not under pressure from external actors.

Following amplified state pressure ahead of the September 2026 Duma elections, including being designated a "foreign agent" and facing politically motivated criminal charges, Nadezhdin has fled Russia and arrived in France to avoid imprisonment.

== Early and personal life ==
Nadezhdin was born in Tashkent, Soviet Uzbekistan. He survived the Tashkent earthquake, which occurred on his third birthday. In 1969, he was brought by his parents to the city of Dolgoprudny where his father studied at the Moscow Institute of Physics and Technology (MIPT), and his mother was a student at the Moscow Conservatory. His paternal grandfather, also Boris Nadezhdin, was a composer and associate professor, originally from Smolensk, who was sent to work in Uzbek SSR at the Tashkent Conservatory. His maternal grandfather fled to Uzbekistan from Ukraine after the October Revolution. He is Jewish.

== Education ==
In 1979 he won the second prize at the All-Union Mathematical Olympiad among high school students. That year, he graduated from the Specialized Boarding School No. 18 for Physics and Mathematics at the Lomonosov Moscow State University. In 1985, he graduated with honors from MIPT. From 1985 to 1990, he was an engineer and researcher at the All-Union Research Center for the Study of Surface and Vacuum Properties.

== Political career ==
Following the 1999 parliamentary election Nadezhdhin served in the 3rd convocation of the State Duma from 1999 to 2003. He ran in the 2003 Russian legislative election from the 109th Mytishchi district of the Moscow Oblast. He lost the election to the former commander of the Moscow District of Internal Troops, Arkady Baskayev (People's Party of the Russian Federation). The Union of Right Forces party, of which Nadezhdin was a member, also lost the elections. At the same time, elections were held for the Dolgoprudny Council of Deputies, in which the City of Hope bloc, under the patronage of Nadezhdin, also lost.

In August 2005, Nadezhdin was a member of the initiative group for the nomination of the former head of Yukos, Mikhail Khodorkovsky, to the State Duma in the by-elections for the 201st University District of Moscow. The nomination did not take place due to the entry into force of the verdict in the first criminal case against Yukos.

In March 2007, Nadezhdin was a Union of Right Forces candidate in the Moscow Regional Duma elections. According to the results announced by the regional election commission, the party lost the elections. However, Nadezhdin said that, according to his data, the Union of Right Forces had overcome the seven percent barrier:

"The figure of 7.08 percent was posted on the website of the Central Election Commission, and it was even shown on TV, and then the election commission announced that we have 6.9 percent. This difference was simply stolen from us!"

Nadezhdin accused the vice-governor of the Moscow Oblast, Alexey Panteleev, of fraud (according to Nadezhdin, the results were adjusted in favor of United Russia). From 6 November 2008 to 2011, Nadezhdin was a member of the Federal Political Council of the Right Cause party.

On 3 August 2011, Nadezhdin, as leader of the Moscow Oblast branch of Right Cause, said in an interview: "In the Moscow Oblast branch, we definitely want to deal with the "Russian" question." According to him, he had already held several round tables on this issue with the participation of nationalists, "And that’s why officers and young skinheads are now joining my department en masse." He referred to certain studies, according to which, in the last few years, about 400,000 people from the southern regions of Russia have moved to the Moscow Oblast for permanent residence. Arguing his position, Nadezhdin emphasized that "The Moscow Oblast is Russian land." Party leader Mikhail Prokhorov reacted quite sharply to these statements. Prokhorov wrote on his blog, "We have not included any nationalists in any party lists and will not include them. Right Cause will not deal with any nationalist movements." Some party members proposed expelling Nadezhdin from the party.

In the 2011 Russian legislative election, Nadezhdin refused to enter the top three of the federal election list of Right Cause but headed the party’s list in the elections to the Moscow Oblast Duma.

On 26 December 2011, Nadezhdin left Right Cause, explaining his decision by the desire to create a new right-wing party together with the former Russian finance minister, Alexei Kudrin.

In February 2012, in the leadup to the 2012 Russian presidential election, Nadezhdin sent an offer to become an authorized representative to the election headquarters of all presidential candidates, including Vladimir Putin. Nadezhdin explained this by the desire to be able to appoint observers to polling stations. He failed to become Putin's authorized representative but became Putin's observer. In mid-February 2012, he was registered as an authorized representative of Sergey Mironov.

On 10 December 2015, at a meeting of the liberal platform of the United Russia party, Nadezhdin announced his desire to participate in its 2016 primaries to participate in the State Duma elections in the fall of 2016, running in the 118th Dmitrov single-mandate constituency. This decision caused criticism from his political colleagues in the liberal camp. Nadezhdin himself explained his participation in the primaries by his desire to start the election campaign earlier; he had no intention of running for United Russia. He performed unsuccessfully in the primaries, losing to Irina Rodnina.

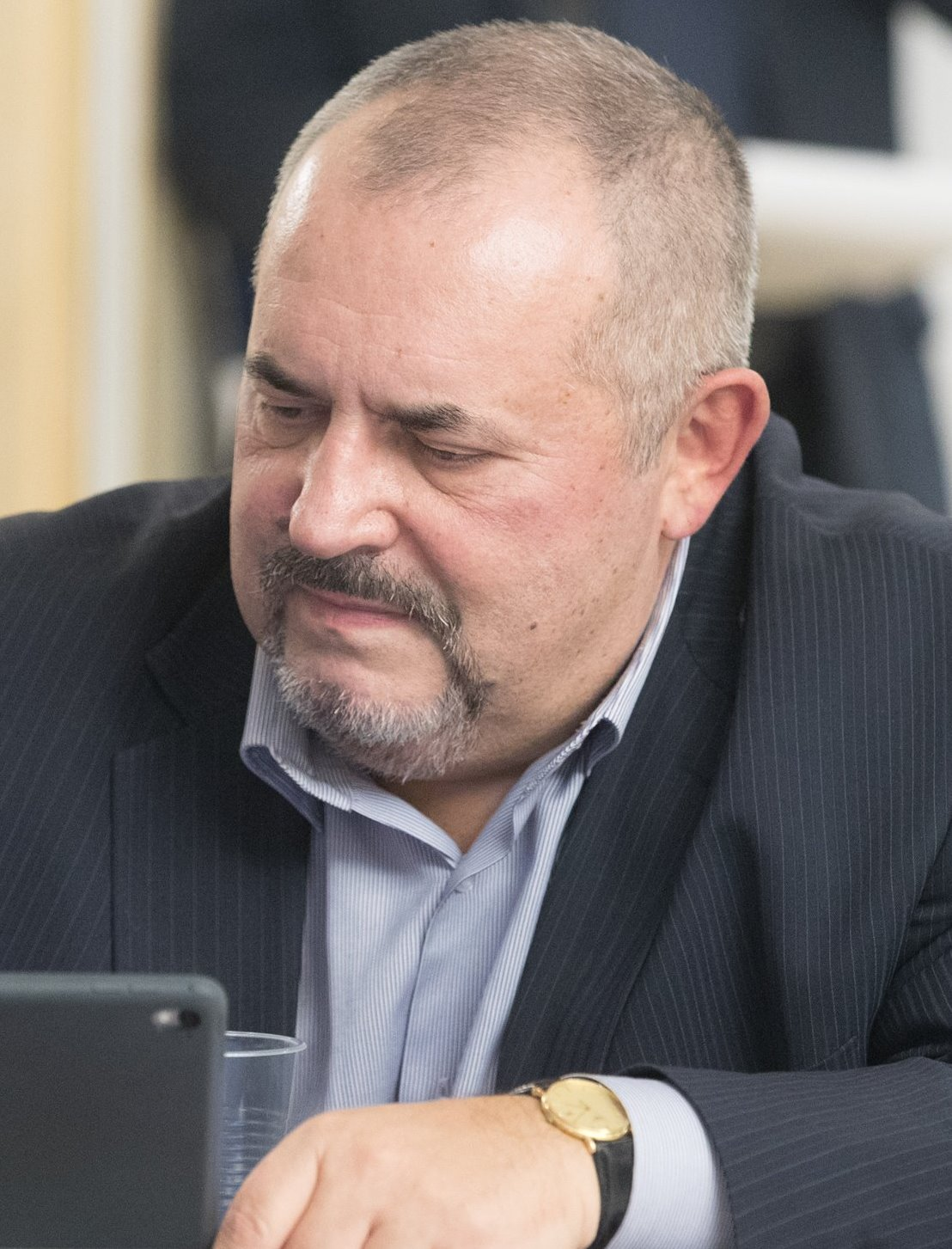
Boris Nadezhdin in 2017

In the 2016 Russian legislative election, Nadezhdin headed the Moscow Oblast list of the Party of Growth without joining the party itself. On 22 December 2016, in an interview with the Kommersant newspaper, he stated that he wishes the Party of Growth "success and good luck" but does not intend to associate himself with the party since "he does not see any prospects for it."

Nadezhdhin contested the 2018 Moscow Oblast gubernatorial election for the Party of Growth.

In 2019, Nadezhdin headed the list of the A Just Russia party in the elections to the City Council of the city of Dolgoprudny. He was elected as a deputy of the Council of Deputies of the Dolgoprudny urban district of the Moscow Oblast in a multi-member electoral district. He headed the faction of the A Just Russia party in the Council of Deputies but was not a party member.

In March 2020, Nadezhdin signed an appeal to Russian citizens against the adoption of amendments to the Constitution of Russia proposed by President Putin.

In the leadup to the 2021 Russian legislative election at the congress of the A Just Russia party, Nadezhdin was nominated as a candidate for deputy of the State Duma in the Dmitrov single-mandate electoral district No. 118 in the Moscow Oblast. Zakhar Prilepin, co-chairman of A Just Russia – For Truth, expressed dissatisfaction, pointing out that the program ideas of A Just Russia do not correspond to Nadezhdin's liberal beliefs. According to the results, Nadezhdin took 2nd place, receiving 40,421 votes (17.12%), losing to the representative of United Russia, Irina Rodnina.

In April 2022, Nadezhdhin stated on an NTV talk show that the Soviet Union had "occupied Czechoslovakia and Eastern Europe," which was met with controversy by other panellists.

In September 2022, as Russia retreated from Ukraine's Kharkiv region, Nadezhdin criticized Russia's intelligence services and called for negotiations to end the conflict on an NTV current affairs show. He criticized Russia's war strategy, stating it was impossible to beat Ukraine using its current methods and materials, calling the strategy "colonial war methods." A few days later, on the Russia-1 channel, Kremlin propagandist Vladimir Solovyov called for Nadezhdin to be arrested.

In January 2023, Nadezhdin suggested the "war was a disastrous mistake" on the NTV current affairs show Mesto Vstrechi. During the last week of March 2023, he was "angrily shouted down" on the same show after he suggested that the West was more powerful than Russia.

In the 2023 Moscow Oblast gubernatorial election, Nadezhdin nominated himself as a candidate for the Civic Initiative party but was denied registration because he could not collect the required number of signatures of municipal deputies in his support.

On 10 July 2026, Nadezhdin was designated as a "foreign agent", and on 13 July he was briefly detained by police. He appeared in court on 17 July in Dolgoprudny, where he was convicted of "displaying extremist symbols", a ruling that bars him from collecting signatures for parliamentary elections in September. This was in relation to an image of opposition figure Alexei Navalny that appeared briefly in the background of a video Nadezhdin had reposted in 2023. He has also been banned from leaving Russia. On 3 August 2026, he posted a video of himself in front of the Eiffel Tower in Paris confirming that he was alive and well, and that he had fled Russia for France.

== 2024 presidential campaign ==
Nadezhdin 2024 presidential campaign logo

On 27 May 2023, Nadezhdin called for electing a new government in Russia in order to stop the war against Ukraine and build relations with Europe.

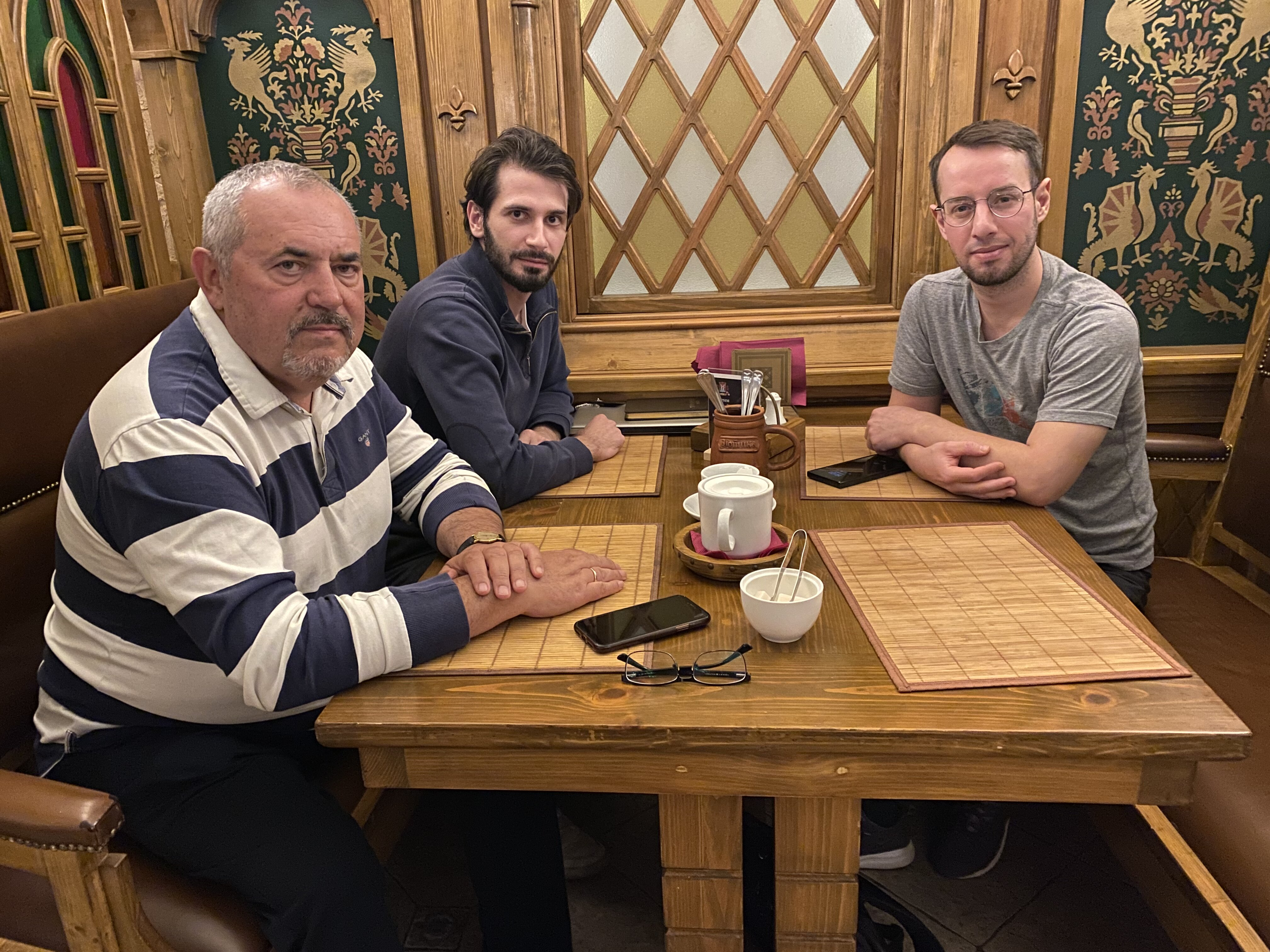
Boris Nadezhdin and Dmitry Kisiev on 6 October 2023

On 6 October 2023, Nadezhdin's participation in the 2024 presidential election was announced by Dmitry Kisiev, founder of the Candidates’ Headquarters, on his social media. On 31 October 2023, Nadezhdin announced that he will run from the Civic Initiative party.

As part of his campaign, Nadezhdin visited wives of Russian soldiers fighting in Ukraine, telling them that the country wanted the war to stop. Protests of wives against the invasion of Ukraine have previously posed an issue for the Kremlin. Nadezhdin also campaigned about widespread infrastructure problems that had been causing heating issues for many across the winters in Russia. Nadezhdin said his opposition to Putin was not just based on the invasion of Ukraine, saying that "practically he destroyed the key institutions of modern government, of modern state in Russia, like parliament, like courts, like free elections etc. My job will be to restore these institutions".

On 31 January 2024, Nadezhdin brought signatures in support of his candidacy to the Central Election Commission. This is the last day to submit signatures to participants in the elections. According to him, signatures were collected in more than 120 cities, a total of 208,000 signatures were collected, of which 105,000 were brought to the CEC. Before bringing the signatures, he gave a speech in which he thanked everyone who donated money for his presidential campaign and claimed that "never in the history of Russia has there been such a thing that a presidential candidate's campaign was entirely based on donations". There were reports of a concentration of security forces near the CEC building with dozens of police cars and paddy wagons around the building, as well as riot police units with dogs on duty. In addition, journalists noticed problems with mobile connection.

In his political program Nadezhdin described himself as "a principled opponent of the current president's policy". Nadezhdin declared the termination of war as a main statement in his election program and wanted to initiate a new peace negotiations with Ukraine and the Western countries. His campaign manifesto stated that "special military operation was Putin's error. Because it was not possible to reach its goals without huge impact on Russian economy and demography". Nadezhdin accused Putin of dragging Russia back into the past and expressed concern that Russia is becoming a vassal of China after being cut off from Western countries following the invasion of Ukraine. Nadezhdin became the only potential candidate who was opposed to the war in Ukraine. His comment that the invasion of Ukraine was a "fatal mistake" by Putin was remarked by NBC News to be "a rare public stance in the country where the regime’s loudest critics are either jailed, exiled or dead".

In January 2024, citing unidentified sources in the Kremlin, the independent news outlet Vyorstka reported that the CEC, at the behest of the Kremlin, will likely reject Nadezhdin’s registration due to his criticism of Putin and anti-war stances. In late January 2024, a source in the Putin administration told the Latvia-based news outlet Meduza: "There’s a portion of the electorate that wants the war to end. If [Putin’s opponent in the elections] decides to cater to this demand, they may get a decent percentage. And [the Putin administration] doesn’t need that." It was already widely thought that authorities would not welcome a candidate who is openly anti the war in Ukraine. On 30 January 2024, Kremlin propagandist and television presenter Vladimir Solovyov warned Nadezhdin: "I feel bad for Boris. The fool didn’t realize that he’s not being set up to run for president but for a criminal case on charges of betraying the Motherland."

On 8 February 2024, Nadezhdin was barred from running against Putin in the presidential election due to alleged "irregularities" in the signatures of voters supporting his candidacy. The election commission claimed that only 95,587 of his signatures in support of his candidacy were valid, just short of the 100,000 needed to run. His team said that some of the "errors" the election commission had claimed existed were merely minor typos that happened when handwritten names were put into its computers.

The rejection of Nadezhdin's candidacy meant that only three candidates other than Putin were to be allowed to run, all from parties which have broadly backed the Kremlin's policies, and who are not seen to be genuine challengers. Many believe that their candidacies were themselves approved by the Kremlin, as part of the managed democracy approach the Kremlin has in controlling elections to give them a figment of legitimacy. Over the years, opponents of the Kremlin have frequently been prevented from running in elections in Russia on the grounds of supposed technical infringements, and the procedure of having to gather signatures is used by the authorities to prevent challengers from running. Putin has not allowed genuine electoral opposition during his rule. On Nadezhdin's campaign, Channel 4 News observed how "at best critics are disqualified, at worst, assassinated", discussing how Boris Nemtsov was killed in 2015, Vladimir Kara-Murza being poisoned and jailed and the same happenning to Alexei Navalny. The Associated Press noted that while election officials had disqualified more than 9,000 of Nadezhdin's signatures in support of his candidacy and disqualified him, they only rejected 91 of President Putin's 315,000 presented signatures.

=== Reception ===
In what has been described as something "seemingly unachievable in Russian politics", his bid for presidency was supported by many opposition politicians and public figures: Yekaterina Duntsova (who was blocked from running on the ballot by the Central Election Commission), Mikhail Khodorkovsky, Ekaterina Schulmann, Yulia Navalnaya (wife of Alexei Navalny), Ilya Varlamov, Lyubov Sobol, Maxim Katz and many others. Russia's main opposition leader Alexei Navalny also passed a message from his imprisonment giving his backing to Nadezhdin's campaign. Navalny had himself been barred from the previous Russian presidential election in 2018 on the grounds of an embezzlement conviction widely considered to be politically motivated, and was then imprisoned on convictions which were also widely seen as being motivated by a desire to silence him. Only one week after Nadezhdin was refused to be allowed to register as a candidate, Navalny was found dead in suspicious circumstances at his prison, which was one of Russia's most harsh penal colonies inside the Arctic Circle.

Queues had formed in towns and villages across Russia and outside Nadezhdin’s headquarters in Moscow to support his bid for president. Footage showed how many thousands had queued even in the snow to sign their names, and he garnered "surprise levels of support". Nadezhdin proved particularly popular with younger urban Russians. The number of Russians who had turned up to sign their names was so unexpectedly high that extra sign-up centres had to be added in Moscow. NBC News said that the fact that Nadezhdin had managed to collect more than 100,000 signatures to support his campaign was "no small feat for a candidate who says his campaign is funded exclusively by crowdfunding".

Russian independent political analyst and former Kremlin speechwriter Abbas Gallyamov told RFE/RL: "People won't be voting for Nadezhdin… but against Putin, because Putin represents the war." Gallyamov, who formerly wrote speeches for Putin, said on DW News that the decision to block Nadezdhin from running was "absolutely predictable" and commented that "anyone who understands how Russian public opinion is functioning now" was already sure that the Kremlin would not allow Nadezhdin to run because of him being an anti-war candidate. Gallyamov said that there was no chance that Russia's Supreme Court would dispute the electoral commission's rejection of Nadezhdin's candidacy, saying "we should understand that all the institutions are fully controlled by Putin and his administration".

The BBC observed that Nadezhdin had been "relatively critical of Vladimir Putin's full-scale war in Ukraine when few dissenting voices have been tolerated in Russia". Ekaterina Schulmann and other political commentators have stated that the Kremlin likely initially ignored Nadezdin's candidacy as he was perceived as uncharismatic and therefore harmless, until queues were seen to register their support for his campaign. The Kremlin appeared to be taken by surprise by that opposition unity in supporting Nadezhdin and by his apparent surge of public support, and images of long queues of people wanting to sign their names to register Nadezhdin were said to have discredited the Kremlin's claims that the public are united behind Putin's invasion of Ukraine. Nadezhdin commented that his high levels of support likely played a part in the election commission deciding to disqualify him, saying: "if my real level of support was 1% or 2% I will have no problem with registration as a candidate. But when I became very popular in Russia and the level of support 5% each week, we rise 5% each week, and now we have 15 or 20%, in this situation tomorrow I will have a big problem in registration". The day before being barred as a candidate, Nadezhdin agreed it was inevitable that he would be disqualified and remarked that "in Russia we have no free and fair elections", but said he saw "no other good way to change the country" and said methods such as a maidan were "very bad". The Associated Press said that Nadezhdin's barring from the election was "a strong signal from the Kremlin that it won’t tolerate any public opposition to the invasion of Ukraine". CNN remarked that the refusal to allow Nadezhdin to run was "a move that further clears the country’s political landscape of opponents to Vladimir Putin".

== Public activity ==
Nadezhdin has been a frequent guest in socio-political talk shows on Russian federal television channels, though he appeared less frequently on federal channels since calling for a change in government. He has been one of the few government critics who have been permitted to appear on talk shows on Russian state-run TV since the invasion of Ukraine, and it has been noted that he was treated as an anti-war "whipping boy" that other guests would focus their criticism on, and is "there to be shouted down by pro-Putin propagandists".

Nadezhdin has credited the fact that he is still alive and free in Russia to his style of always running in accordance to the Russian Constitution and in absolute accordance with Russian laws, saying "I'm very careful" and highlighting that he avoids criticising Putin personally because "it's not a good idea".

== Financial issues ==
In May 2024, Rosenergobank petitioned a commercial court in Moscow to declare Nadezhdin bankrupt, saying that he owed the bank 77.4 million rubles ($920,500) in debt dating back from his 2011 electoral campaign. The court ruled in favor of the petition in April 2025.

== Personal life ==
He has been married three times. His third wife, Natalia Nadezhdina, is a homemaker.

He has four children: his daughter Yekaterina (born 1982) works as a lawyer; his daughter Anastasia (born 2001); his son Boris was born in May 2011. In 2009, his grandson Vyacheslav was born. In October 2013, his son Mikhail was born.

Among Nadezhdin’s hobbies, the media have mentioned songwriting (he released four albums of his own songs) and alpine skiing. By his own admission, he is a fan of computer games, particularly the Tomb Raider series.

In 2008, he suffered his first myocardial infarction, and in 2019 his second; on both occasions, he had a stent implanted.

== See also ==
- Opposition to Vladimir Putin in Russia
