= Civic Initiative (Russia) =

Civic Initiative Гражданская инициатива
- Abbreviation: GRANI
- Leader: Andrey Nechayev
- Founded: 2 March 2013
- Registered: 13 May 2013
- Dissolved: 17 June 2025
- Split from: Civil Initiatives Committee
- Headquarters: 1st Building, Georgiyevskiy Lane, Moscow, Russia. 125009
- Ideology: Liberal conservatism Economic liberalism Liberal democracy
- Political position: Centre-right
- Colours: Blue; White

Party flag
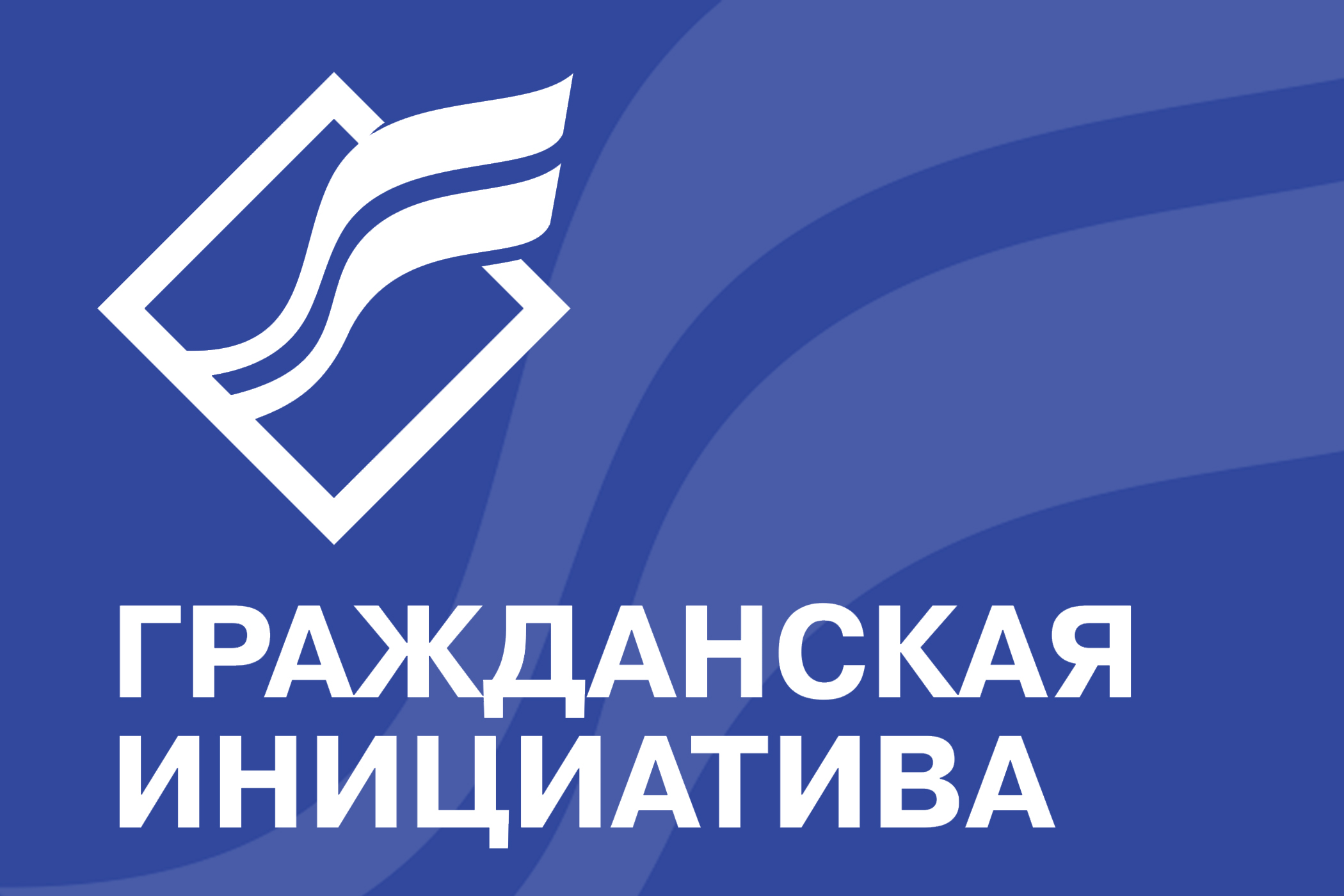

Website
- grazhdan-in.ru

Civic Initiative (Russian: Гражданская инициатива, romanized: Grazhdanskaya initsiativa, GRANI, lit. 'Facets') was a Russian center-right political party. From 2018 to 2020, it was known as the Party of Changes (Russian: Партия перемен; Partiya peremen). The founder of the party, Andrey Nechayev, was the Minister of Economic Development from 1991 to 1994.

On 16 May 2025, the Ministry of Justice requested the liquidation of the party due to its failure to take part in elections for seven years in a row. On 17 June 2025, the Supreme Court of Russia liquidated the party.

== History ==
Alexei Kudrin, who participated in the 2011–2013 Russian protests and wanted to act as a mediator between the opposition and the government, founded the "Civil Initiatives Committee" in April 2012. The organization's title was decided by former finance minister Andrey Nechayev.

Initially, Nechayev planned to create a party with Kudrin, but this project was ultimately abandoned after Kudrin, following consultations with Vladimir Putin, decided that it was too early to form such a party. By that time, Nechayev had already gathered supporters and decided to proceed with creating a new center-right party independently.

The formation of the party was announced on 27 July 2012, and over the next six months, party branches were established in fifty regions. This development was facilitated by a reduction in the legislative threshold for party registration, which lowered the required membership from 40,000 to 500, significantly easing the registration process.

After the dissolution of the Union of Right Forces, the liberal right was unorganized, and on the initiative of Nechayev, a group of like-minded people was again assembled, intending to create a new party with a liberal democratic ideology.

Since the creation of the organizing committee, the party has often taken part in mass actions ("March of Millions", March against the Dima Yakovlev Law, "Right to Arms" rally, "May 6 Prisoners" rally, "For Free Business" rally, "Peace March", "The Rally For a Green Moscow", etc.), in 2020 the party participated in the organization of the "March in memory of Boris Nemtsov".

On 2 March 2013, the party's founding congress was held in the conference room of the Izmailovo hotel, where the party's manifesto, resolution, and charter were adopted, and an application for registration was submitted to the Ministry of Justice. On 13 May 2013, the party was registered.

On 30 January 2014, the party nominated the former Deputy Minister of Economy of Russia, Ivan Starikov, as a candidate for mayor of Novosibirsk. A few days before the vote, Starikov and several candidates withdrew from the elections in favor of the Communist Party of the Russian Federation candidate Anatoly Lokot, thanks to which he won. Starikov was later appointed as Novosibirsk's representative in Moscow with the rank of vice-mayor.

On 14 September 2014, Civic Initiative candidate Yury Vyazov won the early elections for the Head of the Bagansky District of Novosibirsk Oblast, receiving 46.62% of the vote.

In 2015, the political council of the party included Vladimir Ryzhkov, Dmitry Nekrasov, Maxim Katz, Dmitry Gudkov, and Gennady Gudkov. The party decided to nominate candidates for deputies of the Legislative Assembly of the Kaluga Oblast. Among others, the candidates were the party leader Andrey Nechayev and Darya Besedina. Ultimately, they were not allowed to participate in the elections.

On 13 June 2018, the Moscow branch of the party decided to nominate Dmitry Gudkov as a candidate for mayor of Moscow, but he could not pass the municipal filter, submitting only 76 signatures out of the 110 required to the Moscow City Electoral Commission.

In the 2018 Moscow Oblast gubernatorial election, the party supported the former deputy chairman of the Union of Right Forces faction in the 3rd State Duma, candidate Boris Nadezhdin, nominated by the Party of Growth. He received 93,223 votes (4.36%) and came in last place.

The party opposes election fraud and healthcare reform in Moscow. It supports free enterprise, the modernization of the economic and social spheres of life, and the legalization of gun ownership. The party has strongly condemned the murder of Boris Nemtsov.

Most often, despite the signatures collected for the nomination of municipal deputies, party lists are refused registration by local election commissions under various pretexts. On November 25, 2019, the Ministry of Justice filed a lawsuit with the Supreme Court demanding the suspension of the party's activities.

=== 2016 Russian legislative election ===
Civic Initiative tried to unite with Yabloko in order to nominate a single list of candidates for the State Duma elections, but due to the fact that Yabloko was delaying making a decision on this issue, the party joined forces with another right-wing party, the Party of Growth. The cooperation agreement was signed by the chairmen of the two parties - business ombudsman Boris Titov and Andrey Nechayev. At the congress, the party approved a federal list of candidates for the September 18 elections and also nominated candidates in 162 single-mandate constituencies. The federal list includes: Boris Titov, Irina Khakamada, Oksana Dmitriyeva, Dmitry Potapenko, Oleg Nikolaev, Ksenia Sokolova, Natalia Burykina, Andrey Nechayev, Ivan Grachev, Viktor Zvagelsky and Dmitry Porochkin.

Nechayev ran on the federal part of the party list and in the Leningrad single-mandate constituency in Moscow. In a Facebook post, Anatoly Chubais called him one of the most professional candidates for the new Duma, and Maxim Katz said that if a good campaign is carried out, Nechayev has a chance to win.Alexei Kudrin also pinned his hopes on the Party of Growth.

In a single constituency, the party won 679,030 votes (1.29%) and 1,171,259 votes (2.25%) in single-mandate constituencies, thereby failing to bring a single candidate to the State Duma.

Boris Titov believes that the party conducted the best of all election campaigns. He attributes the election result to the existing strong apathy among entrepreneurs and people with liberal views.

=== Ksenia Sobchak's nomination for the 2018 presidential election ===
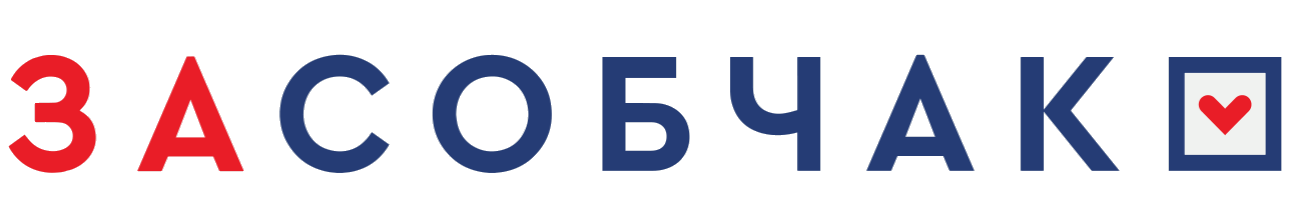
Sobchak campaign logo

Ksenia Sobchak, having declared her support for the Civic Initiative program, joined its political council on 23 December 2017. At the same time, she was nominated by the party as a candidate for the post of President of Russia. Sobchak officially announced her nomination and explained that she considered participation in the elections the best legal way to express protest and that she planned to become a kind of "against all" candidate. Nechayev agreed to the nomination with the expectation that the votes collected in the elections would help the party to obtain state funding, and access to federal television channels would increase recognition, while Nechayev was categorically against Sobchak's nomination if it would be "part of the Presidential Administration's election game".

Sobchak's nomination was supported by Mikhail Khodorkovsky, Andrey Makarevich, Vladimir Pozner, and Mikhail Kasyanov.

Sobchak's "123 Steps" election program was helped by Vladislav Inozemtsev, director of the Post-Industrial Society Research Center, and Andrey Nechayev, party leader, and Avdotya Smirnova (in the part related to inclusive society and provisions related to this area in the program) and lawyer Elena Lukyanova (provisions related to constitutional reform). In addition to these individuals, Sobchak's campaign headquarters included: one of the founders of the NTV television company Igor Malashenko, who campaigned for Boris Yeltsin in 1996, director of the AIDS.Center Anton Krasovsky (previously headed Mikhail Prokhorov's headquarters), a Belarusian political strategist who worked with the headquarters of the Angela Merkel and Barack Obama, Vitaly Shklyarov, director of external relations of the Snob project Ksenia Chudinova, director Sergei Kalvarsky, former editor-in-chief of the Political News Agency Stanislav Belkovsky, human rights activist Marina Litvinovich, blogger and former member of the Russian Opposition Coordination Council Rustem Adagamov, Timur Valeev (head of the Open Elections project at Mikhail Khodorkovsky's Open Russia) and former VK press secretary Georgy Lobushkin. Also Demyan Kudryavtsev, whose family owned the newspaper Vedomosti, gave Ksenia advice related to the campaign.

On February 13, 2018, it became known that Sergei Kovalev, the first ombudsman for human rights in the Russian Federation, would become the confidant of the candidate Ksenia Sobchak for the presidency, but a day later he refused this, stating that “one should not undertake what is not you know how to do in the best possible way, and in what you do not feel firmly convinced".

The sponsors of the Sobchak campaign were Serguei Adoniev (co-owner of Yota Devices), Alexander Fedotov (president of the publishing house ACMG, which publishes L'Officiel, Forbes, SNC and OK! Magazines in Russia), Vladimir Palikhata (founder of the Legacy Square Capital investment group, Russian publisher of the magazine about entrepreneurship Inc.), Alexander Roslyakov (owner of the Onego Shipping transport company), Vadim and Yana Raskovalovs (owners of the Sportlife sports club network and the Yana jewelry company) and Anatoly Tsybulevsky (founder and co-owner of New Energy Systems).

As a result, in the presidential election (March 18, 2018), candidate Ksenia Sobchak gained 1,238,031 votes or 1.68%, taking 4th place. Her result was the highest among candidates with liberal programs (Yavlinsky - 1.05% and Titov - 0.76%).

==== Conflict between Ksenia Sobchak and Alexei Navalny ====
In an interview with TV Rain, Ksenia Sobchak stated that she was willing to withdraw her candidacy if Alexei Navalny managed to secure his registration as a candidate. Before her nomination, Sobchak had suggested that Navalny create a contingency plan in case he was not allowed to run or he could consider his wife, Yulia, as a potential candidate. However, Navalny rejected both proposals, arguing that the votes of those willing to support him could not simply be transferred to another candidate.

Navalny first spoke about Sobchak's nomination by saying, "Ksenia Sobchak, being a Russian citizen over 35 years old and not in prison, has every right to nominate her candidacy.". However, Navalny would later call Sobchak "a caricatured liberal candidate with a cannibalistic position", and she, in return, accused him of wanting to have a monopoly on the opposition.

At a press conference with President Putin, Sobchak spoke about Navalny, saying: “There is a candidate, Navalny, who has been campaigning for a year. Fabricated criminal cases were brought against him specifically to prevent his candidacy. Their fabricated nature was confirmed by the European Convention on Human Rights.” Navalny later thanked her for raising the issue. However, after the final decision to deny his registration as a presidential candidate, he called on his supporters to boycott the election.

Despite everything, Ksenia Sobchak offered Navalny to become her confidant so that he would have the opportunity to speak on TV channels instead of her, but he refused.

On election day, Alexei Navalny spoke about Sobchak's visit to his home in the fall of 2017, during which Ksenia, according to him, admitted that she had received an offer of a substantial monetary reward for her nomination and participation in the presidential race. Sobchak rejected accusations of collusion with the authorities.

=== Boris Nadezhdin's nomination for the 2024 presidential election ===
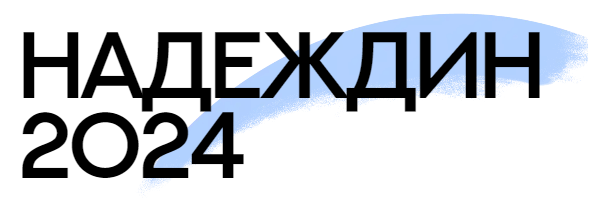
Nadezhdin campaign logo

Boris Nadezhdin is a former member of the Russia State Duma and currently Moscow Oblast's local politician. On 6 October 2023, Nadezhdin's participation in the election was announced by Dmitry Kisiev, founder of the Candidates’ Headquarters, on his social media. On 31 October 2023, Nadezhdin publicly announced that he will run from the Civic Initiative party.

On 17 June 2025, the Supreme Court of Russia, acting on a petition by the Ministry of Justice, ordered the dissolution of Civic Initiative for failing to participate in elections since 2018, during which its candidates were blocked from registering by election officials.

== Democratic coalition ==
Ahead of the September 2015 regional elections, it was announced that the party had become a member of a democratic opposition coalition, which planned to participate with a single list from the People's Freedom Party in six elections across three regions. However, the politicians failed to reach an agreement, as a result of which the democratic coalition and the Civil Initiative had to compete in the elections to the Legislative Assembly of Kaluga Oblast, but the party was not admitted to them.

In 2016, the party tried to unite with Yabloko for the sake of nominating a single list of candidates for elections to the State Duma, however, because Yabloko delayed making a decision on this issue, the party joined forces in the election campaign with the Party of Growth".

Party chairman Andrey Nechayev often tries to unite democratic forces, but this happens very rarely. He spoke about Yavlinsky's inability to negotiate and reproaches Navalny for destroying the democratic coalition.

== Party of Changes ==
Party of Changes Партия перемен
- Leader: Dmitry Gudkov
- Founders: Ksenia Sobchak; Dmitry Gudkov; Andrey Nechayev
- Founded: 23 June 2018
- Dissolved: 30 March 2020
- Preceded by: Civic Initiative
- Succeeded by: Civic Initiative
- Headquarters: 1st Building, Georgiyevskiy Lane, Moscow, Russia. 125009
- Ideology: Liberalism; Liberal democracy
- Political position: Centre to centre-right
- Colours: Light blue Red

Website
- https://peremen.party/

On March 13, 2018, Vedomosti reported that Ksenia Sobchak and Dmitry Gudkov would announce on March 15 the creation of a new right-wing party based on the Civic Initiative. From that moment, the party began to have problems with the Ministry of Justice (which is why the party's rebranding was informal). Gudkov said that the main goal of the project would be to get to the State Duma — to win the parliamentary elections in 2021.

At the end of May, Znak.com, citing its sources, said that the congress was postponed from June 3 to the autumn, which is due to the position of the presidential administration, which wants to hold a single voting day in 2018 "with a minimum number of scandals and competition."

On May 31, 2018, during a press conference with Gudkov, Sobchak, and Nechayev, it was announced that the congress would be held on June 23. Additionally, Dmitry Gudkov declared his candidacy for the 2018 Moscow mayoral election from the party. He mentioned that he had already gathered the signatures of municipal deputies and would soon submit the signatures to the Moscow City Election Commission or the Mayor's Office.

On June 23, 2018, a founding congress was held, where it was decided to create a new "Party of Changes" on the basis of the "Civil Initiative." Ksenia Sobchak and Dmitry Gudkov were appointed to the top posts of the party. New symbols appeared and 15 people entered the new political council, including:

- Gudkov
- Sobchak
- Andrey Nechayev
- Alexander Solovyov, former chairman of the Open Russia movement
- Timur Valeev, executive director of Open Russia
- Anton Nemtsov, son of Boris Nemtsov
- Dmitry Nekrasov, former executive secretary of the Russian Opposition Coordination Council
- Marina Litvinovich, a political scientist
- Elena Lukyanova, a lawyer
- Yevgeny Yasin, Russia's Minister of Economy from 1994 to 1997
- Yevgeny Gontmakher
- Nikolai Svanidze, a journalist
- Maxim Reznik, former chairman of the Saint Petersburg regional branch of Yabloko from 2003 to 2012

On March 1, 2019, the youth movement "Petersburg - City of Changes!" was created in St. Petersburg in order to counteract the activity of the "Party of Changes" in the city, the municipal elections, and the election of the governor of St. Petersburg.

In April 2019, it became known that Sobchak had stopped funding the Party of Changes.

Dmitry Gudkov left the party in March 2020, not wanting to interfere with the struggle to preserve the structure. Nechayev became the chairman of the party again, the name remained the same - "Civic Initiative".

== Electoral results ==
=== President ===
Election year	Candidate	1st round		2nd round	
Election year	Candidate	No. of overall votes	% of overall vote	No. of overall votes	% of overall vote
2018	Ksenia Sobchak	1,238,031 (4th)	1.68		
2024	Boris Nadezhdin	Not admitted to the elections			

=== State Duma ===
State Duma
Year	Votes	%	± pp	Seats	+/–	Rank	Result
2016	Part of Party of Growth		New	0 / 450	New	9th	extra-parliamentary opposition
