= Dmitry Gudkov =

Russian politician (born 1980)

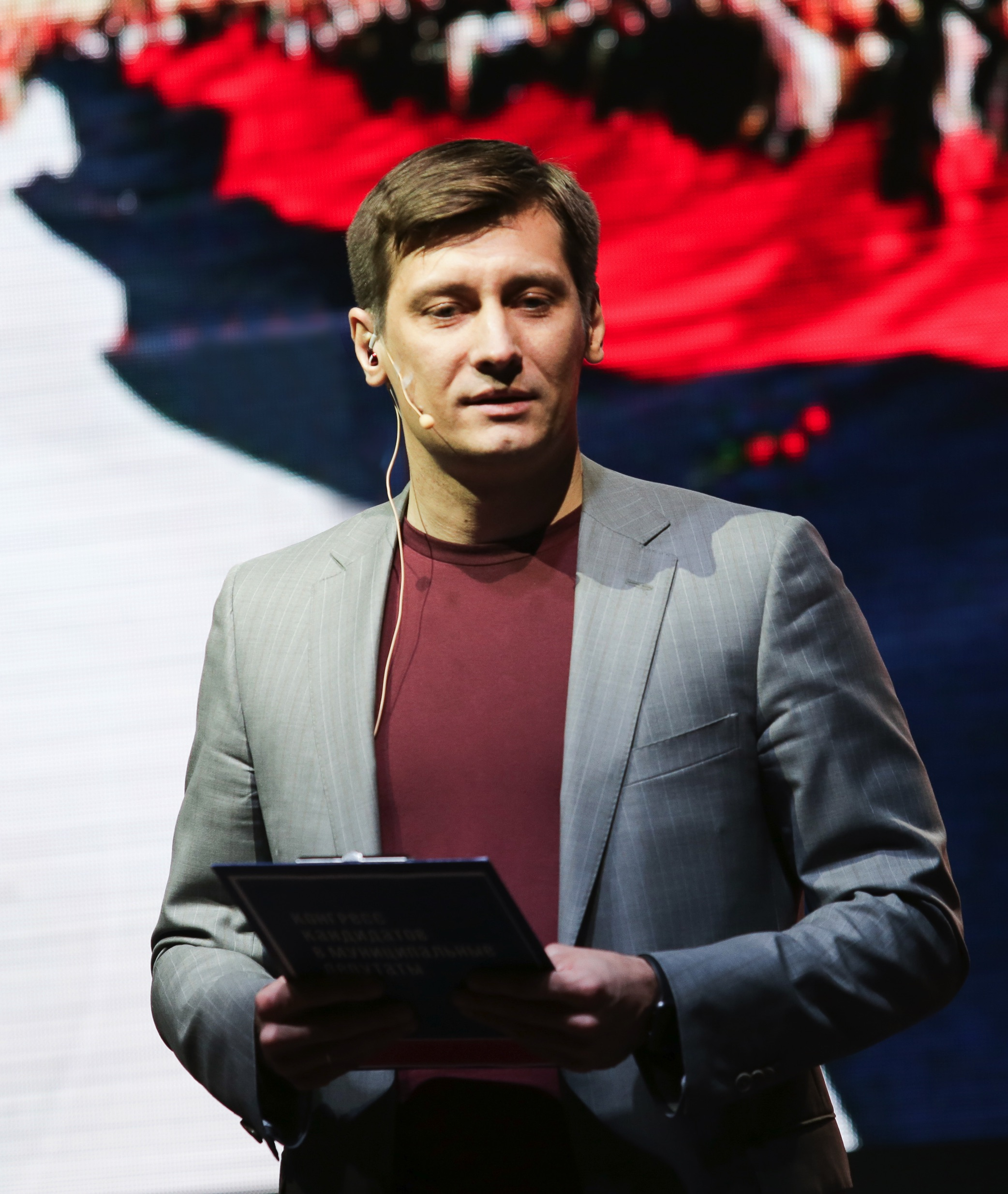
- Gudkov in 2017

Deputy of the State Duma Russia
- In office 21 December 2011 – 5 Осtober 2016
- Constituency: Regional Group No. 56 (Ryazan Oblast, Tambov Oblast)

Leader of the Party of Changes
- In office 23 June 2018 – 30 March 2020
- Preceded by: position established
- Succeeded by: position abolished

Personal details
- Born: Dmitry Gennadyevich Gudkov; 19 January 1980 (age 46) Kolomna, Russian SFSR, Soviet Union
- Party: Fair Russia (until 2013); Party of Changes (2018–2020)
- Spouses: Sofya Gudkova (m. 2002; div. 2012) Valeria Sushkova (m. 2012) Dmitry Gudkov's voice From the Echo of Moscow Program, 23 November 2013
- Children: 3
- Parent: Gennady Gudkov
- Education: Moscow State University
- Occupation: Politician
- Known for: Opposition to President Vladimir Putin

Dmitry Gennadyevich Gudkov (Russian: Дмитрий Геннадьевич Гудков; born 19 January 1980) is a Russian politician who served as a Member of the State Duma from 2011 to 2016.

His father, Gennady Gudkov, was also a Duma deputy in 2001–2012. Both father and son were members of the party Fair Russia. Gudkov was expelled from the party on 13 March 2013 after it accused him of "calling on the American authorities to interfere in Russia’s internal affairs". While Gudkov ran as candidate of Yabloko party and worked with the non-systemic opposition, he lost in the 18 September 2016 election for the Russian Parliament. In 2018, he and Ksenia Sobchak decided to align together, which lead to the creation of an opposition political party which is called the Party of Changes.

In 2024, he became a co-founder and expert at the "European Center for Analysis and Strategies" (CASE).^{[117]}

== Education ==
Dmitry Gudkov was born on 19 January 1980 in the city of Kolomna, Moscow region in the family of Maria Gudkova and Gennady Gudkov. When his son was born, Gennady Gudkov worked in the Komsomol; in 1981–1992 he served in the KGB, retired in the rank of major, and in the same year he founded the private security company "Oskord", which became a major player at this market by the end of the 1990s.

In 1996, Dmitry Gudkov graduated from the Moscow school #625 with in-depth study of physics and mathematics and entered the journalism faculty of Moscow State University. In his student years he worked in several publications: he was the editor-in-chief of "Security" - a trade magazine about protection, and also worked in the department of public relations of his father's company. Gudkov made his first steps in politics in 1998–1999, becoming a member of the electoral headquarters of his father in the elections to the 3rd State Duma from Kolomna single-mandate district #106. After graduating from the journalism faculty in 2001, Gudkov went on to do his postgraduate studies, and received a second higher education at the Faculty of World Economy of the Diplomatic Academy of the Ministry of Foreign Affairs.

== Political activity ==
=== People's Party of the Russian Federation (NPRF), "A Just Russia", youth policy ===
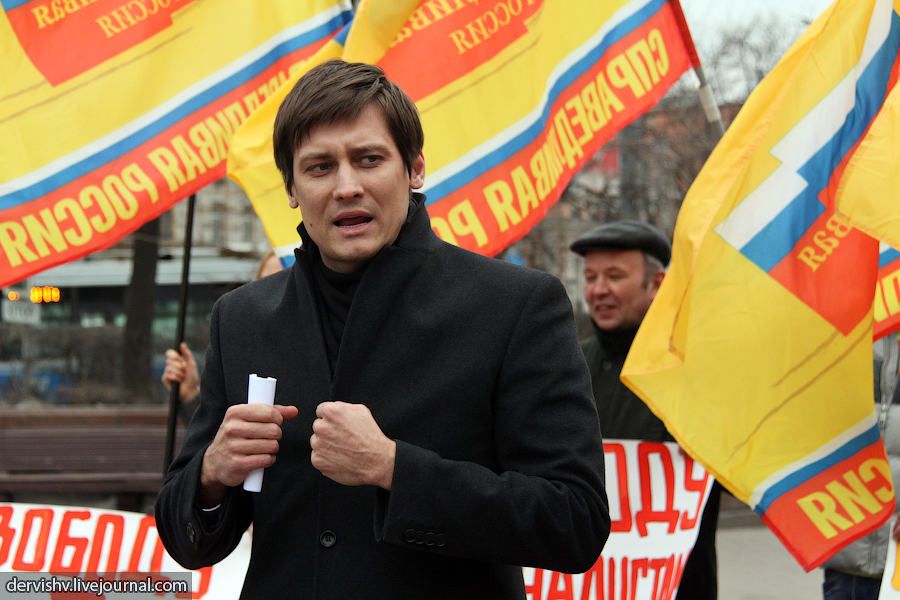
Dmitry Gudkov during a public gathering in defense of the rights of journalists. Moscow, March 2011

Dmitry Gudkov followed in his father's footsteps for a significant part of his political career. In 2001, Gennady Gudkov won in the by-elections to the 3rd Duma and joined the deputy group "People's Deputy", and Dmitry Gudkov got a job in the staff of this group. In 2003, he followed his father to the People's Party of the Russian Federation (NPRF): while Gennady Gudkov was deputy chairman of the party, Dmitry Gudkov substituted the head of the press department, and after the father was elected a chairman of the party in April 2004, Dmitry Gudkov was promoted to a position of a head. He was involved in the coordination of the youth policy of the NPRF, participated in the creation of the Youth Public Chamber. In December 2005, Dmitry Gudkov took part in the additional elections to the 4th Duma in Moscow's single-seat constituency #201, but lost with 1.5% of the votes. After the merger of the NPRF with "A Just Russia" in early-mid April 2007, Gennady Gudkov entered the Political Bureau of the Presidium of the Central Council of the Party, and Dmitry headed its press department.

At the end of April 2007, the youth blocks of the NPRF, the Social Democratic Party of Russia (SDPR), the human rights organization "Civil Society", the movements "Ura", "League of Justice", "Energy of Life", "Young Life" and other youth organizations of "A Just Russia" were united within the all-Russian movement "Pobeda" ("Victory"). Dmitry Gudkov became the co-chairman of the organization, since he previously supervised the youth policy of the NPRF. In April 2008, the congress of "Pobeda" elected Yury Lopusov, a former leader of the "Energy of Life", as the only chairman of the congress, which led to a conflict between Lopusov and Gudkov. In October 2009, Dmitry Gudkov headed the "Young Socialists of Russia" - a new youth movement within the framework of "A Just Russia", which included "Pobeda" and youth departments of the Russian Party of Life, the SDPR, “Rodina” party, the Russian Party of Pensioners and several others.

At the Fourth Congress of "A Just Russia" in June 2009, Dmitry Gudkov was elected a member of the Central Council of the Party, and in 2010 he became an adviser to Sergey Mironov, the Chairman of the Council of Federation of the Federal Assembly of the Russian Federation, the leader of the "A Just Russia".

=== Work in the 6th State Duma ===
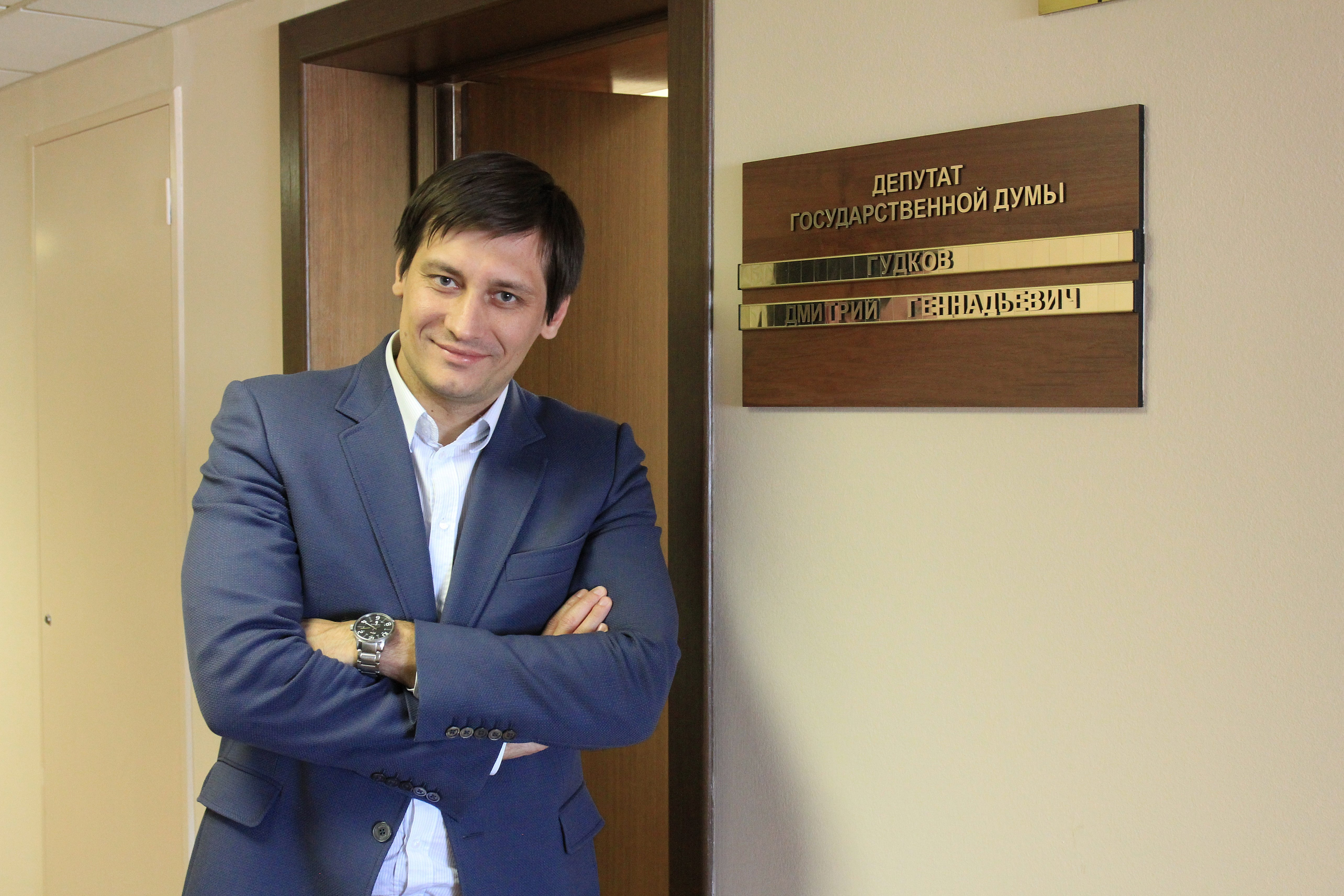
Dmitry Gudkov in the Parliament, 2013

In December 2011, Gudkov was elected to the 6th State Duma at the head of the list of "A Just Russia" from the Ryazan and Tambov regions, where the party gained 15% and 6% respectively (compared to 13% in the country). During his mandate, Gudkov worked in the Committee on Constitutional Legislation and State Building, and individually and as part of a group of deputies, initiated 43 legislative drafts, including:

- Amendments to the law "On Science and State Science and Technology Policy", proposed together with Ilya Ponomarev and Oleg Smolin in June 2014, and suggesting academic degrees to be revoked regardless of the time of its conferral if plagiarism is found in scientific works of the author. The bill was considered and rejected in the first reading in January 2015.
- Amendments to the law "On Special Economic Measures" and Article 8 of the Federal Law "On Security", proposed together with Sergei Doronin, Valery Zubov, Sergey Petrov and Mikhail Serdyuk, suggesting the introduction of a mandatory form of federal law for decisions on economic sanctions (at that time the President's order was enough to impose economic sanctions). The initiative was criticized by representatives of all parliamentary parties, and in May 2017 the bill was rejected in the first reading.
- Amendments to the legislative acts regulating the activities of non-profit organizations, introduced in July 2015 and involving the abolition of the concept of "foreign agent" in relation to NGOs. In the commentary to the bill, Gudkov noted that many of the organizations included in the corresponding register did not meet the formal criterion - they were not engaged in political activity. The bill was repeatedly postponed, and in May 2016 the amendments were rejected. In parallel with that, the State Duma approved the amendments prepared on behalf of President Vladimir Putin, which cleared the definition of political activity by separating it from work in the field of science, culture, art, health and health care, social services, support and protection, protection of motherhood and childhood, social support of the disabled, promotion of healthy lifestyle, physical culture and sports, protection of plant and animal life and charitable activities.
- The Federal Law "On the Election of Deputies of the State Duma of the Federal Assembly of the Russian Federation", drafted together with the Committee of Civil Initiatives, was introduced in October 2015 and suggested the transition to a mixed-member proportional representation according to the German model and the introduction of multi-mandate constituencies and electoral blocks in the Duma elections. In November 2015 the State Duma Committee on Constitutional Legislation and State Building rejected the bill till it was improved.

No legislative draft, which was suggested by Gudkov or together with him, was adopted, except for the "mass" (signed by a large number of deputies) bill "On Amendments to the Federal Law "On Computation of Time" (a permanent shift to winter time), adopted in July 2014. Also, Gudkov was one of the eight deputies of the State Duma who in December 2012 voted against the federal bill "On Sanctions for Individuals Violating Fundamental Human Rights and Freedoms of the Citizens of the Russian Federation", better known as "Dima Yakovlev Law" because it prohibited adoption of Russian orphans by US citizens. Also, Gudkov was among 4 deputies who did not vote for the law "On Admitting to the Russian Federation the Republic of Crimea and Establishing within the Russian Federation the New Constituent Entities of the Republic of Crimea and the City of Federal Importance Sevastopol". Later, while on air at the TV Rain channel, Gudkov explained that he abstained from voting "for" because of the political and economic consequences of the decision and abstained from "against" because of the conflicting public opinion on the question of joining the Crimea to the Russian Federation and out of respect for the inhabitants of the Crimea.

=== Participation in the protest movement 2011–2013 ===
The Gudkovs are noted for their opposition to President Vladimir Putin and his United Russia party. Along with Ilya Ponomarev, Dmitry and Gennady Gudkovs became leaders in the 2012 protests against Putin's re-election. In the period of winter 2011 to spring 2012, Gudkov took an active part in protest actions and acted as one of the organizers of the rallies "For Fair Elections". During the unauthorized "public festivities" on Kudrinskaya Square following Vladimir Putin's inauguration, Gudkov tried to present the rally as his meeting with voters to prevent the detention of protesters. According to Gudkov, he was illegally detained on an opposition meeting on Nikitsky Boulevard on 8 May 2012, but the police claimed that the politician himself followed the detainee Ksenia Sobchak. In the elections to the Russian Opposition Coordination Council in October 2012, Gudkov was ranked the tenth in the civil list. In May 2013, Gudkov criticized Maxim Katz, a municipal deputy of the Shchukino district who prematurely left the opposition council and called for his dissolution, for "showing weakness" and creating a motive to criticise the Coordination Council. In September of the same year Gudkov himself refused to run for new membership in the Council. After Gudkov's refusal and other members of the Coordination Council to participate in the further work of the association, the council basically ceased its activities.

In June 2012, Ponomarev, Gudkov and his father led a filibuster against a bill allowing large fines for anti-government protesters, alternating speaking against the bill for 11 hours. Gennady Gudkov said of the bill that by removing outlets for protest, the legislation was putting Russia on "a sure path to a civil war". The Economist described the filibuster as "the most striking act of parliamentary defiance in the Putin era".

=== Expulsion from the party "A Just Russia" ===
In January 2013, after Gudkov's participation in "March against Scoundrels", when the participants carried portraits of deputies, including Sergey Mironov, the Bureau of the Presidium of the Central Council of "A Just Russia" party suggested that Gudkov leave either the Opposition Coordination Council (OCC) or "A Just Russia". Oleg Shein, who participated in OCC, and Ilya Ponomarev, who "combined" membership in the party and participation in "Left Front", faced the same choice. At the same time, the bureau advised party members not to take part in the meetings of non-systemic opposition. The Gudkovs refused to leave the Opposition Council, while Ponomaryov and Shein chose the party.

On 13 March 2013, by decision of the Presidium Bureau of the Central Council of the Party, Gennady and Dmitry Gudkov were expelled from "A Just Russia" party for "actions that harm the party". The question of their expulsion was put forward by Sergei Mironov, the leader of the party. Among the reasons, apart from participation in protest movement and OCC, was the violation of party discipline and Gennady Gudkov's support of a candidate from another party in the election of the mayor of Moscow region Zhukovsky. The expulsion of the Gudkovs from the party attracted the media attention, but it was not the first time for "A Just Russia": eight years ago eight members were expelled from the party for violating party discipline (Leonid Levin, Nikolai Lakutin, Igor Zotov, Jamal Hasanov, Aleksey Mitrofanov, Vadim Harlov, Vladimir Mashkarin and Vladimir Parahin). Some of them were suspended for voting for Dmitry Medvedev for the post of the prime minister, and others for rejecting the radicalization of the party because of its support and participation in protests.

When addressing members of the Bureau, Gennady Gudkov said that it was impossible to make a choice between "A Just Russia" and work in OCC. Declaring his readiness to accept any decision of fellow party members, he expressed confidence that "A Just Russia" "makes a strategic mistake in playing up to the authorities". After Gudkov's expulsion, Ilya Ponomaryov and Valery Zubov publicly criticized the Bureau's decision. On 14 March, Ponomaryov announced the suspension of his party activities before the autumn congress of the party.

After Gudkov's expulsion from the party, Sergey Naryshkin, the State Duma Speaker, noted that Gudkov's "special status" would not affect his work in parliament.

=== Running for the 7th State Duma ===
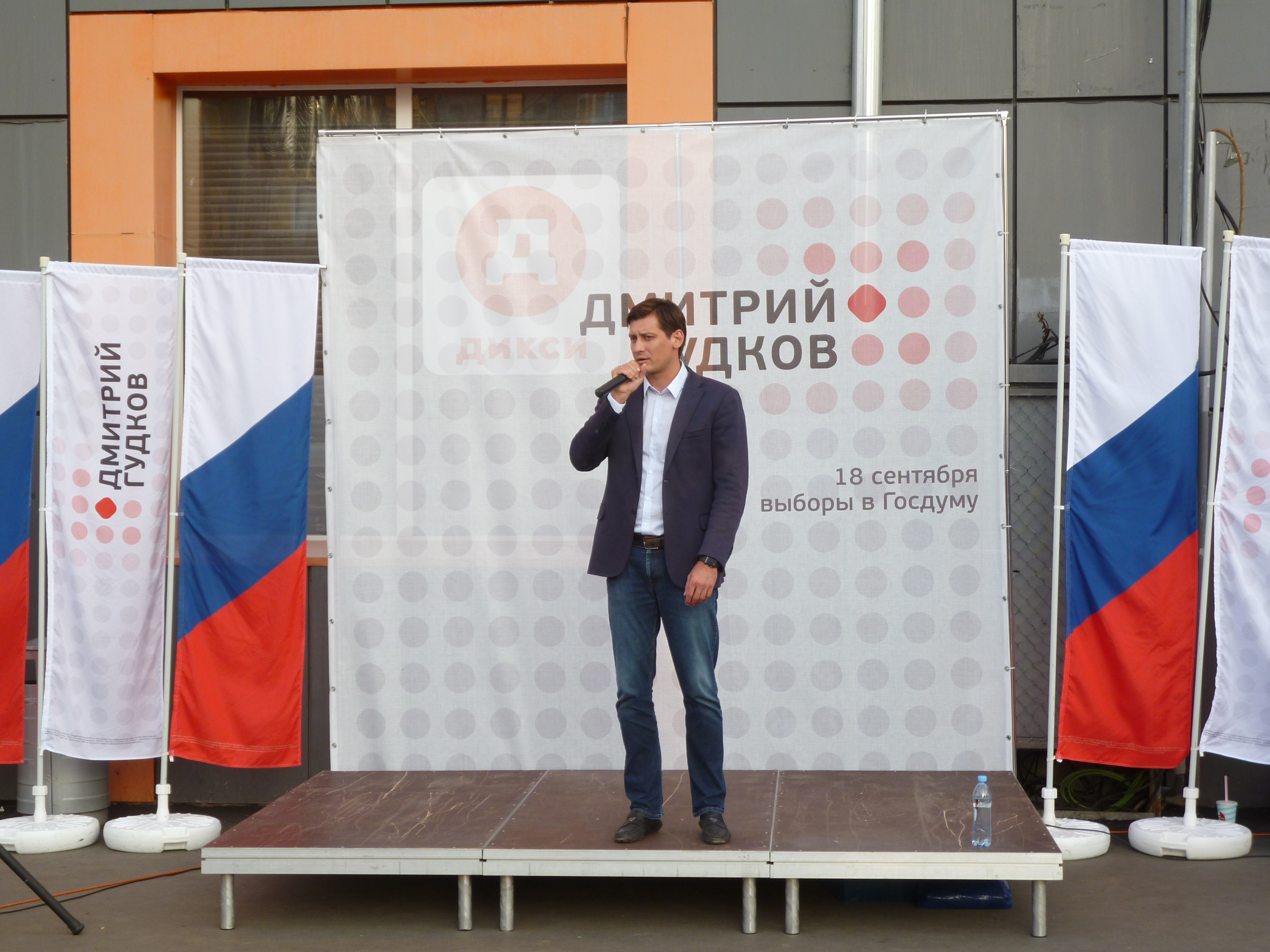
Speech by Dmitry Gudkov

In the elections to the 7th State Duma Gudkov represented the "Yabloko" party in Tushino single-member electoral district (#206): in March 2016 he signed a memorandum of "Yabloko", pledging to accept all the party's election plans. Also as a candidate Gudkov claimed to support the "People's Freedom Party". Maxim Katz became the head of Gudkov's election headquarters. As part of the campaign, Gudkov received 40 million rubles in donations to the electoral fund, but these funds were not enough. In August 2016, members of the electoral headquarters responsible for organizing meetings with voters filed a class action lawsuit against Gudkov because they hadn't received their salaries, and on 14 September Gudkov's headquarters ran out of funds and had to stop campaigning. According to the Ministry of Internal Affairs, on the day of silence on 17 September, 55 people engaged in illegal propaganda in favor of Gudkov were arrested. The candidate's headquarters denied the number of detainees and denied the fact of illegal campaigning.

On 18 September, Gudkov with his 20.4% of the vote lost to his major rival, former Chief Sanitary Inspector of Russia Gennady Onishchenko, who got 26.04% of the votes. Even though Gudkov was in the first 10th of the federal party list of "Yabloko", his hope to overcome the party's 5% barrier didn't come true as well. The politician noted that he did not face falsifications, and both Gudkov and Katz agreed that among the reasons of the defeat were low turnout, indifference of voters and public distrust of elections.

=== United Democrats and elections of municipal deputies in 2017 ===
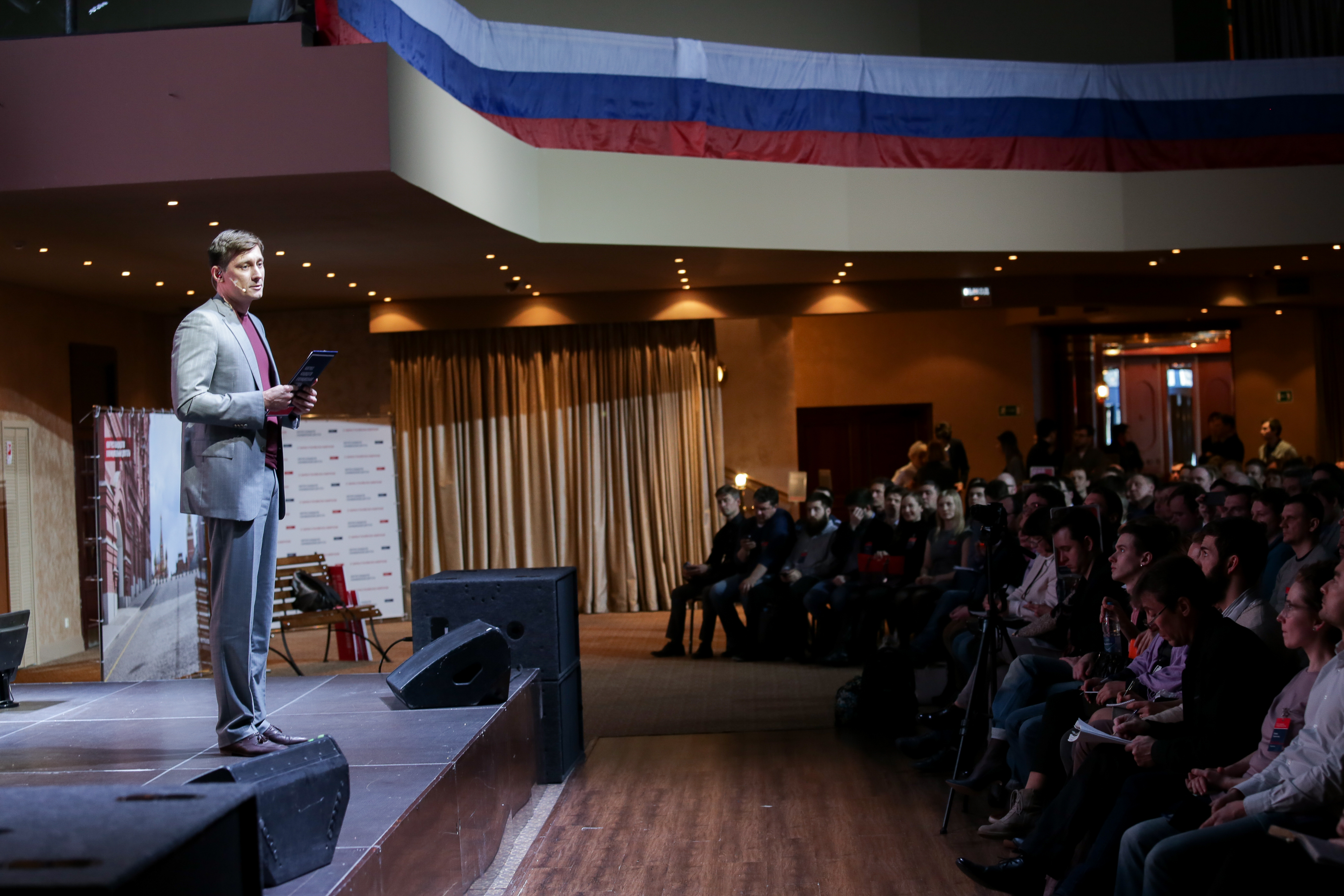
"United Democrats" and elections of municipal deputies in 2017

Just before the elections to the councils of deputies of municipalities in Moscow in 2017, Gudkov and Katz created a "United Democrats" coalition to support those wishing to become municipal deputies. "United Democrats" were engaged in fundraising, helped candidates fill out documents, conduct campaigns, provided premises and campaign materials. Among the candidates supported by Gudkov and Katz were self-nominated candidates, representatives of "Yabloko", the Communist Party of the Russian Federation, and "Solidarnost". The aim of the association was to overcome the "municipal filter" in the mayoral election in Moscow in 2018, which required support of 5-10% of municipal deputies and heads of municipalities. In total, according to the results of the 10 September 2017 elections, "United Democrats" managed to get 266 people out of 1,052 candidates through into municipal assemblies. The Manifesto of "United Democrats" declared support for all independent candidates of democratic views, but some participants complained that they were excluded from the "United deputies" because of divergences in views with Katz. Such cases were noted in Khoroshevo-Mnevniki, Basmanny district and Arbat, and disagreements included, in particular, differences in views on the improvement of specific streets or the attitude to paid parking. Excluded participants also noted that Katz was inclined against regional activists and preferred beginners in politics. At the end of January 2018 Gudkov announced that he had stopped his cooperation with Katz due to disagreements.

=== Party of Changes ===
On 15 March 2018, Dmitry Gudkov and Ksenia Sobchak announced the creation of the Party of Changes on the basis of the party Civic Initiative.

=== Detention and emigration ===
On 1 June 2021 Dmitry Gudkov was sent to police custody on the charges of "causing property damage by deception or breach of trust" of city of Moscow. According to Gudkov's lawyer Alexander Aldayev the case is caused by bankruptcy of a firm owned by Gudkov's relatives that caused an unpaid debts for renting a basement in 2015. According to Aldeyev Gudkov had learnt about the debt only on the day of his arrest. On the same day more than 140 police officers searched Gudkov's office, his apartment, his country house, his sister-in-law's apartment as well as the apartment of his chief of staff Vitaly Vendiktov. Together with Gudkov his aunt Irina Ermilova and the former chairman of Open Russia movement Andrey Pivovarov.

On 3 June 2021 Gudkov was released from his prison and on 6 June 2021 he left Russia for Ukraine. In his Facebook post Gudkov explained that he received credible threats from the Presidential Administration of Russia that "otherwise the fake criminal case will continue until his arrest". The following day Gudkov stated on Ukrainian television that he soon would join his parents in Bulgaria. Gudkov's father, and fellow opposition leader, Gennady Gudkov relocated to Varna in 2019 in what he claimed to be "a precautionary measure."

Dmitry Gudkov opposes the Russian invasion of Ukraine and believes that Russia must lose. In February 2023, the Russian government placed Gudkov in its list of "foreign agents".

== Critics ==
On 26 March 2012, Sergei Udaltsov, the coordinator of the Left Front, criticized his ideological associates from "A Just Russia" Dmitry Gudkov and Ilya Ponomarev for their participation in the "NTVshniki" TV program which was aired on 25 March 2012. "Now I do not understand. The opposition boycotts NTV, but the oppositionists are on the air now. Ain’t anyone responsible for his words nowadays?", Udaltsov wrote on Twitter.

=== Income ===
During the campaign "Golden pretzels" the media attention was attracted by Gudkov's own incomes. It was reported that in the declaration filed before the elections to the 6th State Duma, the politician declared revenue of 600 thousand rubles received from the JSC Trade House "Nizhny Novgorod Oil and Fat Factory". In his parliamentary declaration for 2012, Dmitry Gudkov specified that together with his wife he received a total income of 2.42 million rubles. During the same period, the family acquired three cars: Mazda3, Volkswagen Tiguan and Volkswagen Touareg.

During the election campaign in 2016 Eduard Bagirov, Gudkov's opponent, published a footage of the politician's undeclared residence in the Kolomensky District, Moscow region, which has two houses, auxiliary buildings, a sauna complex, a winter garden and a sports field. The cost of the estate is estimated at over 100 million rubles.

==== Townhouse ====
In June 2013, the LDPR leader Vladimir Zhirinovsky requested the Duma commission for control over the reliability of information about deputies income about the sources of Gudkov's income, who owned a 248 sq.m. apartment in a townhouse on Yurovsky street in Kurkino. Internet users estimated the cost of the apartment at 45 million rubles, which significantly exceeded the declared income of the parliamentarian for 2011–2012. Gudkov replied that he had bought the townhouse by instalments in 2006–2010 and provided the contract with the developer - his father's company, the security company "Pantan". Gennady Gudkov also commented Zhirinovsky's suspicions, he said that he had received the land in Kurkino in the 1990s as payment for security services, and the townhouses were built by the company which he co-invests, which allowed the Gudkovs to buy the apartment at prime cost. The commission was satisfied with the documents provided, and Gudkov soon sold the "problem" townhouse for 23.5 million rubles, which was noted in his income declaration of 2013.

=== Foreign companies ===
In April 2013, Dmitry Gudkov was accused of not having declared his share in the Bulgarian company "Marie House" before the election. The politician responded by saying that just before the elections he had transferred a share in the company to confidential management his brother. In June 2013, the International Consortium of Investigative Journalists (ICIJ) published publicly available information on the owners of more than 100,000 offshore companies. Then for the first time it became known that Dmitry Gudkov had been owning Parustrans Ltd., a company registered in the British Virgin Islands, since 2006, and in violation of the law had not declared the possession of foreign companies. Although the company was registered by a Moscow-based company Global Wealth Management Center, Gudkov in his tweet expressed the opinion that the owner of the company is his namesake from Houston, the USA.

=== Accusations of lobbying the interests of construction companies ===
In April 2013, Elena Tkach, a coordinator of the Coalition for Moscow and the municipal deputy of the Presnensky District, accused Gudkov of lobbying for the interests of construction companies whose projects involve the demolition of historic buildings in the center of Moscow. According to Tkach, in the past Gudkov repeatedly tried to negotiate with her about buildings on Tishinskaya Square (the "Donstroy" project) and about building #25 on Bolshoy Kozikhinsky Lane, and in April insisted at a meeting to discuss buildings #13 and #15 on Kozikhinsky, which local deputies had been defending since 2009. In her blog and in interviews, Tkach said that together with Gudkov, at the meeting there were also Vyacheslav Dushenko, a member of "A Just Russia", and the son of the owner of the Investcom company, which was claiming for the land. According to Tkach, Gudkov represented the developer as sponsor of the "Parfenov" program on the TV Rain channel and claimed that by allowing the demolition of the building she would support the Russian opposition, and Dushenko threatened her with the use of an administrative resource. Radio “Svoboda” noted that earlier Gudkov's attempt to finance "Parfenov" through the Opposition Coordinating Council led to a conflict with a number of its members and Andrey Piontkovsky’s withdrawal from the association.

Gudkov declined to comment on media accusations, and replied in his blog that he had not been lobbying anything, but acted as an intermediary. According to him, he arranged a meeting at the request of a colleague whose friend was extorted by the Moscow mayor's office to pay a bribe in exchange for the land registration, threatening to transfer the land to Nikita Mikhalkov. Gudkov claimed that he left the meeting 15 minutes after it began, and also denied the connection of the invited entrepreneur with the "Parfenov" program. After the publication of Tkach's statements, Anatoly Vyborny, the deputy from "United Russia", sent a request to the Duma ethics commission to assess the ethics of Gudkov's actions, and a request to the Prosecutor General's Office to check the information in the Tkach's blog.

=== Accusations of populism ===
In December 2008, as a result of an error during repair works, oil spills from the Transsibneft oil pipeline took place near Novoaleksandrovka village in Moshkovsky district of Novosibirsk Oblast. According to the "Argumenty y Fakty" magazine, in early 2009 the consequences of the accident were eliminated, and the company paid compensation to the local budget. In 2010, Nikolai Kuznetsov, the head of production and technical services of the Transsibneft equipment, published a video in which he accused the company of concealing an environmental disaster, while Gudkov, as head of the "Young Socialists of Russia", attracted public attention to the publication. In 2009–2010, Kuznetsov participated in a number of Moscow political moves, which drew attention to accusations against Transsibneft. In December 2010, Kuznetsov was fired from Transsibneft for systematic non-fulfillment of his duties (the employee twice tried to challenge the dismissal, but the court took the side of the employer), and in the spring of 2012 he became Gudkov's assistant as a member of the State Duma. Soon in the blog of the politician, there was a publication accusing the company of polluting the river Balta. As an evidence, a videotape was provided, in which a group of people take dead fish out of the ice hole. The publication attracted the attention of regional media and environmental publications, which saw forgery and "political PR" in the footage. The specialists, including Yevgeny Upadyshev, the deputy head of the Verkhne-Ob basin department for fishery, named the freezing of the rivers, which is characteristic of the Novosibirsk region, to be the likely cause of fish death.

=== Trip to the USA ===
On 1 March 2013, Dmitry Gudkov travelled to the United States, where he planned to agree on cooperation in the search for undeclared real estate of Russian officials, as well as to visit families who adopted children from Russia. After visiting several American families, the deputy reported that he had no difficulties with it. He also pointed out that the embassy of the Russian Federation did not contact with foster parents and was not interested in the further life of the adopted children.

On 4 March, Gudkov participated in the conference "A New Approach or the Status Quo? Relations between the US, EU and Russia at the time of Putin's repression". It took place in the building of the US Senate, and its organizers were the human rights organization Freedom House, the foundation and the "Institute of Contemporary Russia". In his speech Gudkov pointed out that the Constitution of the Russian Federation gives "unlimited" power to the president, on the basis of which Vladimir Putin built a "vertical of power". In his opinion, the authorities took the path of tightening the screws and falsifying criminal cases against organizers and leaders of protest actions. The parliamentarian described the State Duma as an "enraged printer" which is adopting repressive laws against protest activity. In conclusion of his speech, Gudkov asked the Americans to help Vladimir Putin in the fight against corruption, and to spread information about the foreign property of Russian officials.

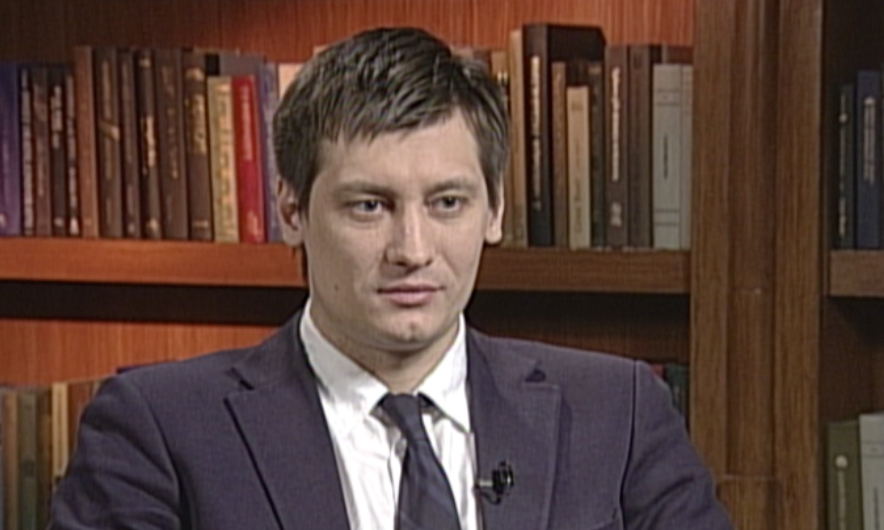
Dmitry Gudkov gives interview to "Voice of America" on 8 March 2013

Gudkov's speech provoked sharp criticism of journalists from the state-run media of Dmitry Kiselyov and Vladimir Solovyov, as well as the deputies. Sergei Zheleznyak from "United Russia" called his colleague a traitor, and the leader of LDPR party Vladimir Zhirinovsky demanded to arrest Gudkov for treason. Georgy Fedorov, a member of the Civic Chamber of the Russian Federation, demanded to check, at whose expense Dmitry Gudkov traveled to the US. Dmitry Gudkov said that he paid for trip himself and provided copies of payment documents as evidence.

On 13 March 2013, Sergei Zheleznyak sent a request to the State Duma committee on matters of parliamentary ethics in connection with Gudkov's trip to the USA. According to him, "it is necessary to investigate the actions of Gudkov in America", since "he had no right to act as a parliamentarian". On 15 March, deputies Sergei Zheleznyak, Svetlana Goryacheva, Oleg Denisenko and Igor Lebedev signed an appeal asking for an assessment of Dmitry Gudkov's actions in connection with his trip to the US and speaking at the conference. The commission considered this appeal on 20 March.

On 20 March, Gudkov did not appear at the meeting of the Ethics Committee. Members of the commission from "A Just Russia" also did not attend the meeting, and the remaining participants decided to deprive him of a right to speak for a month, to demand an apology and to offer him to hand over his mandate. At the same time, Nikolay Kovalev, head of the commission for revenue control of "United Russia" deputies, reported that he had spoken in Vienna with US Senator Ben Cardin about joint efforts to find foreign property and accounts of Russian officials.

== Personal life ==
Mother — Maria Petrovna Gudkova (born 1956), a chairman of the board of directors of the security structures association "Oskord".

Father — Gennady Vladimirovich Gudkov (born 15 August 1956, Kolomna, Moscow region) - a Russian politician and entrepreneur.

Younger brother — Vladimir Gudkov, general director of the debt collection agency "Central Debt Agency".

=== Family business ===
For more than 20 years, Dmitry Gudkov's mother and brother were running a private security firm "Security Agency Pantan", which had several thousands employees. In May 2012, the license for private security activities of the agency was suspended for a month due to violations, and then withdrawn on a permanent basis. Another security company of the Gudkovs - "Ajax-Inter" - was deprived of a license for weapons in September 2012. The Gudkovs described these inspections as politically engaged.

Dmitry Gudkov's brother Vladimir Gudkov runs one of Russia's largest debt collection agencies, "Central Debt Agency", which collects debts in a variety of regions in the interests of Sberbank, Alfa-Bank, Uralsib, Raiffeisenbank, Renaissance Credit.

=== Wives ===
First wife, Sofya Gudkova is a journalist and a television producer. She worked for the programs "Namedni" and "Profession - reporter", she was the chief editor of daily and evening news at "Channel One Russia" and of "The Final Program" at NTV Channel. She was married to Gudkov for almost 10 years and she brings up the children of the politician - Anastasia and Ivan. After the divorce in May 2012, Sophia quit NTV channel. Gudkov argued that Sophia made this decision in order not to work on the program, which compromises him and other opposition politicians. In 2015, Sophia married the former head of the Department of Culture of Moscow, Sergey Kapkov.

The second wife, Valeria Gudkova (maiden name — Sushkova) is the former press secretary of the youth wing of "A Just Russia" and the politician himself. According to some sources, the office affair began after Gudkov's separation from his first wife, according to other information, it became the reason for the divorce. Gudkov and Sushkova got married July 2012, and in August 2013 the new wife gave birth to a son, Alexander. In March 2012, Valeria participated in a public gathering near the building of the Defense Ministry on New Arbat, during which the wives of military men demanded to provide them with housing. Gudkov's common-law wife stood there with a placard: "The wives of military men demand that the state fulfill its obligations to provide housing", while Dmitry Gudkov has never served in the army and received the rank of a reserve officer at the military department at the university.

=== Hobby ===
It was reported that in school years Gudkov received a degree of candidate for master of sports in basketball, and in 2012 he said that he continues to engage in this kind of sport sometimes. Dmitry Gudkov reported that at least twice a week he goes to the gym and likes to play the guitar.

== Filmography ==
- 2012 — Term — directors Alexey Pivovarov, Pavel Kostomarov and Alexander Rastorguev.
