= Gennady Gudkov =

Russian politician and businessman (born 1956)

- Геннадий Гудков
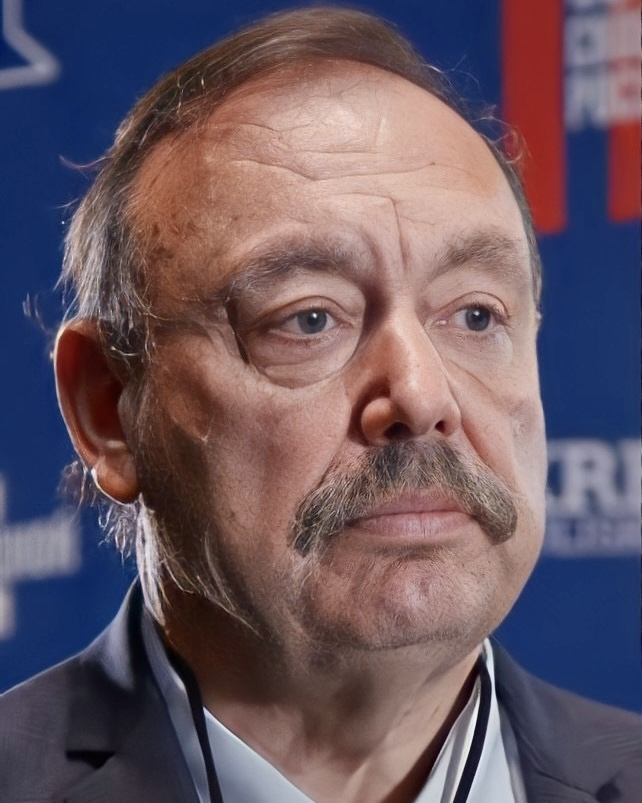
- Gudkov in 2021

Member of the State Duma
- In office 2001 – 14 September 2012

Personal details
- Born: Gennady Vladimirovich Gudkov; 15 August 1956 (age 70) Kolomna, Moscow Oblast, RSFSR, Soviet Union
- Party: Communist Party of the Soviet Union (1979-1991); People's Party of the Russian Federation (2004—2007); A Just Russia (2006—2013); Alliance of Greens and Social Democrats (2014-present)
- Children: Dmitry and Vladimir
- Education: Kolomna State Pedagogical Institute (1978)
- Occupation: politician, businessman
- Known for: opposition to Vladimir Putin, expulsion from State Duma

Military service
- Allegiance: Soviet Union; Russia
- Branch/service: Committee for State Security (KGB); Federal Security Service (FSB)
- Rank: Lieutenant colonel
- Gennady Gudkov's voice Gudkov on the Echo of Moscow program, 9 December 2013

Gennady Vladimirovich Gudkov (Russian: Генна́дий Влади́мирович Гудко́в; born 15 August 1956) is a Russian politician and businessman. The Moscow Times described him in 2012 as "one of parliament's most vocal and charismatic critics" of President Vladimir Putin.

== Background ==
Gudkov received a degree in languages, an English specialist, from Kolomna State Pedagogical Institute in 1978. He speaks both English and German. After graduation, he served in the Soviet Army from 1978 until 1980 and during his enlistment, he joined the Communist Party. After his service in the Soviet Army, he returned to Kolomna and worked with the Kolomna city Communist Party as an instructor in Komsomol and later as the head of operational and defense-mass work department (Russian: заведующим отделом оперативной и оборонно-массовой работы). He joined the KGB, the Soviet Union's national security agency, in 1981, working there for the next decade and finishing at the rank of lieutenant colonel. He was KGB for Kolomna city until 1989 when he worked in the Office of Counterintelligence Operations for KGB at Moscow city and Moscow oblast (region) (Russian: Службе контрразведывательных операций УКГБ по Москве и области). In 1989, he graduated from the Red Banner Institute. Yu. V. Andropov. In 1992, after he resigned from the Russian Bureau of Criminal Procedure in Moscow and the Moscow Region as a major working as an operative officer, he formed his Oskord security company (Russian: «Оскордъ») employing many siloviki (Russian: Силовики). From 1997 until 2001, he held a post in the Federal Security Service on an advisory board with other heads of private security companies. He was active with UNESCO and was elected to vice-president of the Moscow International Fund for the Promotion of UNESCO in 1999.

== Duma career ==
Gudkov was first elected to the State Duma in a by-election of the Kolomna 106th District on 18 March 2001, joining the People's Party of the Russian Federation. Gudkov won the seat again in the 2003 and 2007 legislative elections.

Gudkov was serving as deputy chairman of the parliamentary Committee on Security during the 2002 Moscow theater hostage crisis, in which 40-50 Chechen Islamist separatists took over a theater holding 850 people. He blamed the failure of security forces to prevent the attack on a systematic destruction of state security institutions following the fall of the Soviet Union.

Following the 2004 Nazran raid, in which Chechen rebels killed 90 people at police facilities in Ingushetia, Gudkov supported President Vladimir Putin's firings of top military officials, stating, "[t]he general staff made serious mistakes regarding the military structures' actions in Chechnya." He stated that "This will go on until we ourselves learn how to prevent terrorist acts, until we learn how to carry out effective operations to destroy terrorists" and called for better pay for security forces to attract better quality personnel and prevent corruption, stating that the latter may have contributed to the Beslan school hostage crisis. He also supported a law allowing undercover security officers to commit illegal acts such as buying guns or drugs in the course of their duties.

=== Opposition to Putin ===
In March 2004, following a weak performance by the People's Party in the recent legislative elections, Gudkov succeeded Gennady Raikov as chairman of the party. Gudkov later became a member of Putin's United Russia party, before switching in 2007 to the populist A Just Russia party, many of whose members opposed Putin. In September of that year, he criticized a bill supported by United Russia allowing Gazprom, Transneft, and other corporations to train and arm private security forces, calling it a Pandora's box. In October, he complained that United Russia "will not allow opponents" and that Russia was becoming a one-party state, and in December 2008, he sought to amend and clarify a Duma bill greatly expanding the definition of treason. In March 2009, he criticized legislation by Dmitry Medvedev to ban political parties with less than a 7% nationwide vote from parliament, saying that "only an incorrigible optimist could consider that a pro-democracy move".

In October 2011, Gudkov said that due to lack of free debate, "a huge negative energy among the public ready to explode any moment". He aligned himself with the "swamp opposition" (Russian: "болотных оппозиционеров"), which held anti-Putin sentiments. The following month, he broke ranks with his party's moderate criticism of Putin and warned that major street protests could result if United Russia committed electoral fraud in the impending election. In the speech, Gudkov stated that "our elections are a mix of abuse of administrative resources and work going ahead at full speed to ensure falsification". Footage of the speech became a popular video on Russian blogs.

Over the next year, Gudkov became a frequent participant and leader in public protests against Putin. In January 2012, a secret recording of a conversation between Gudkov and politician Vladimir Ryzhkov was released in which the two appeared to discuss how to undermine other anti-Putin forces; the two called it a plot to sow distrust between opposition groups. In June, Gudkov's son Dmitry Gudkov, also a Duma deputy, led a filibuster against a bill allowing large fines for anti-government protesters. Gennady Gudkov also spoke against the bill, stating that by removing outlets for protest, the legislation was putting Russia on "a sure path to a civil war". The Economist described the filibuster as "the most striking act of parliamentary defiance in the Putin era".

Following Gudkov's opposition, his private security firm, Oskord, became the target of "a campaign of raids and investigations from a variety of bodies, from the fire department to the Moscow architectural committee". Permission for its guards to carry firearms was revoked, making its usual security operations difficult. Gudkov estimated in July that he had lost 40% of his business.

== Expulsion from Duma and emigration ==
In August 2012, a special committee of the Duma was formed to investigate allegations that Gudkov had violated parliamentary rules by making money from the construction firm Kolomensky Stroitel while also holding his seat. The Prosecutor General and Investigative Committee presented evidence that Gudkov had broken anti-corruption laws, and the minutes of a Kolomensky Stroitel meeting with Gudkov's signature was given as evidence of his business activity.

On 15 September 2012, Gudkov was stripped of his seat in the Duma by a vote of 291 to 150. Gudkov called the vote a farce, saying "This is a reprisal. It is not a court." A Just Russia party leader Sergey Mironov described Gudkov's expulsion as "unlawful revenge". United Russia Deputy Andrei Isayev stated that Gudkov had to be stripped of his seat, arguing, "People expect fairness: Everyone is equal in the eyes of the law. We cannot undermine that hope of our people." Analysts described the vote as part of a broader crackdown against Putin's critics, noting the recent charges against anti-corruption activist Alexei Navalny. The Economist wrote that "like, in a way, Mikhail Khodorkovsky, the question is not whether Mr Gudkov ran afoul of Russian law but rather why Russian law seems to matter so little to his peers who keep themselves in the Kremlin’s better graces."

Gudkov relocated to Varna (Bulgaria) in 2019 in what he claimed to be "a precautionary measure."

== Social Democrats of Russia merges with Alliance of Greens — People’s Party ==
On 14 March 2013, he formed the Social Democrats of Russia (SDR) (Russian: «Социал-демократов России») and merged it with the Alliance of Greens — People’s Party on 25 January 2014 to become a co-chairmen of the Alliance of Greens and Social Democrats. On 8 October 2014, he resigned from his co-chairmanship and was forced from the party. (Note: This party changed its name to the Green Alliance on 12 December 2015.)

== Family ==
Gudkov is married and has two sons, Dmitry and Vladimir. First elected in 2011, Dmitry was also a State Duma deputy (formerly also for the Just Russia party). In the Duma, Dmitry was a member of the opposition to Putin known as the Swamp (Russian: "болотный", named after a square in Moscow where anti-Putin opposition held mass protests). Dmitry was not reelected in the 2016 Russian legislative election. In June 2021 Dmitry Gudkov also left Russia and stated on Ukrainian television that he intended join his parents in Bulgaria.
