= Andrey Nechayev =

Former Minister of Economic Development of Russia

- Андрей Нечаев
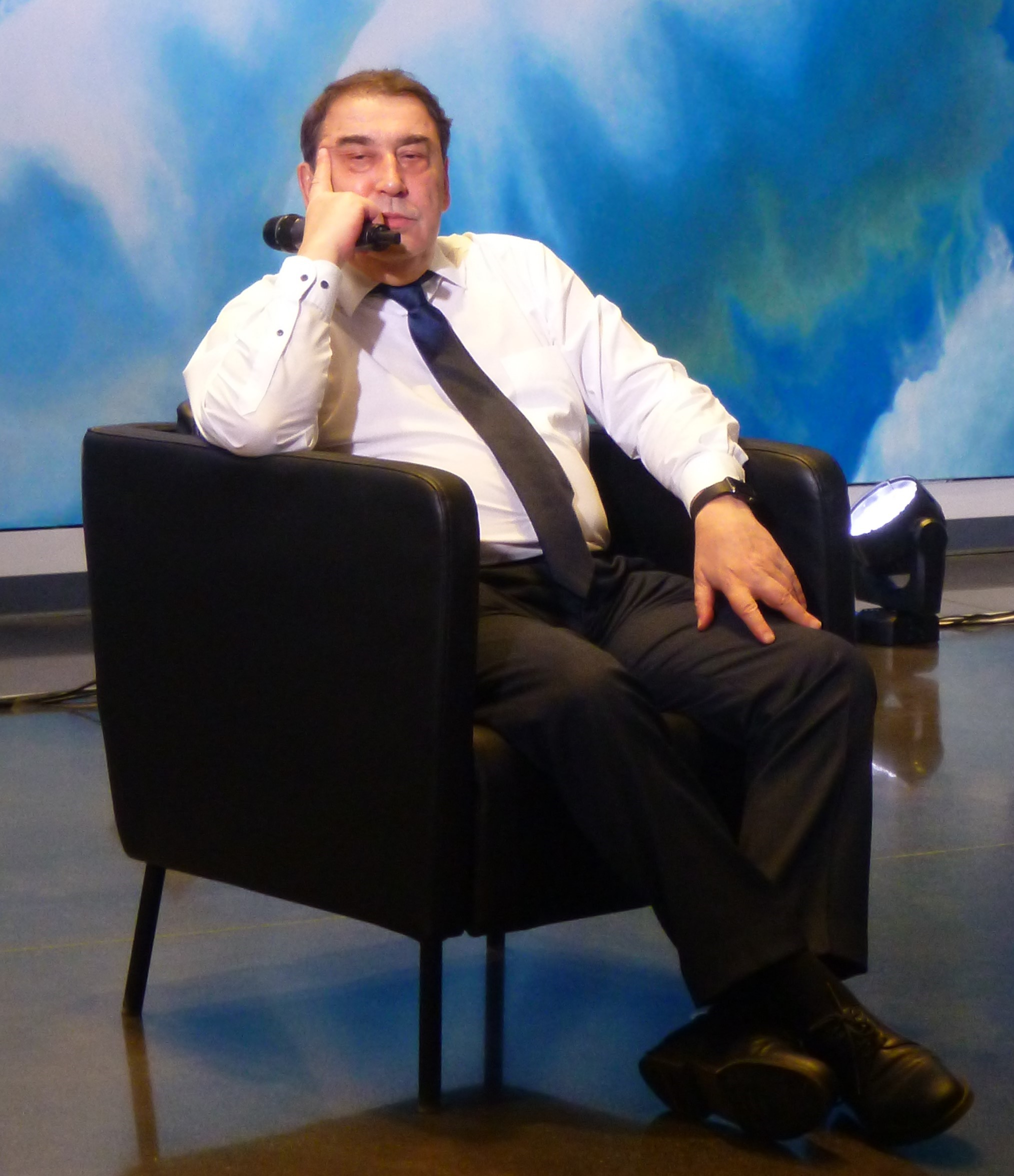
- Nechayev in 2022

Minister of Economy
- In office February 19, 1992 – March 25, 1993
- President: Boris Yeltsin
- Preceded by: Yegor Gaidar
- Succeeded by: Andrey Shapovalyants

Personal details
- Born: Andrey Alekseyevich Nechayev; 8 February 1953 (age 73) Moscow, RSFSR, Soviet Union
- Party: Civic Initiative (since 2013)
- Education: Lomonosov Moscow State University
- Andrey Nechaev 's voice Nechayev on the Echo of Moscow program, 2 September 2012

Andrey Alekseyevich Nechayev (Russian: Андрей Алексеевич Нечаев; born February 2, 1953) is a Russian politician, scientist and economist. He served as the first economy minister of the Russian Federation from 1992 to 1993 in Viktor Chernomyrdin's First Cabinet. Nechayev is one of the authors and active participants in the program of market-oriented economic reforms in Russia.

== Biography ==
Nechayev is a Doctor of Economics, Professor (2002), author of 25 books (including co-authored), and almost 300 scientific publications on economic developments and policies. Academician of the European Academy of Sciences and Arts, Academician of the Russian Academy of Natural Sciences and the International Informatization Academy. Professor of Plekhanov Russian University of Economics.

He was the president of the state owned Russian Financial Corporation (RFK) from 1993 until 2005 when it was privatized and he continued as president of Bank Russian Financial Corporationс or RFK-Bank с from 2005 to 2013.
