= Alexey Panteleev =

Russian politician (1959–2026)

- Алексей Пантелеев
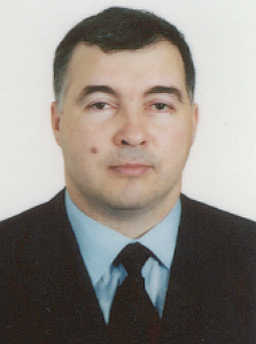
- Official Federation Council portrait

Member of the Federation Council of Russia for the Nenets Autonomous Okrug
- In office 18 July 2009 – 9 February 2012
- Preceded by: Farkhad Akhmedov
- Succeeded by: Igor Koshin

Personal details
- Born: Alexey Borisovich Panteleev; 2 February 1959 Samara, Russian SFSR, Soviet Union
- Died: 2 June 2026 (aged 67)
- Education: Moscow Higher Combined Arms Command School; Frunze Military Academy; Russian Academy of State Service
- Occupation: Lawyer; politician

Alexey Borisovich Panteleev (Russian: Алексей Борисович Пантелеев; 2 February 1959 – 2 June 2026) was a Russian politician. He served in the Federation Council from 2009 to 2012.

Panteleev died on 2 June 2026, at the age of 67.
