= State University of Humanities and Social Studies =

- Государственный социально-гуманитарный университет
- Established: 1939
- Location: Kolomna, Moscow Oblast, Russia; 55°04′36″N 38°46′28″E
- Website: gukolomna.ru

State University of Humanities and Social Studies (Russian: Государственный социально-гуманитарный университет) is a higher education institution located in Kolomna, Moscow Oblast. It was founded in 1920.

== History ==
The history of pedagogical education in Kolomna dates back to the 17th century, when a theological seminary operated in the city, training not only clergy but also teachers. Among its students was Philaret (Drozdov) (1782–1867), Metropolitan of Moscow and Kolomna.

Following the seminary's closure in 1805, a district school (uyezd school) was established in the city; it was later transformed into a two-grade school and, from 1896, a three-grade municipal school. Its graduates included Nikita Petrovich Gilyarov-Platonov, a professor at the Moscow Theological Academy and founder of Sovremennye Izvestiya ("Modern News"), the first public-access newspaper in Moscow—as well as the Kislovs, a prominent family of patrons from Kolomna, and the economist and statistician Ivan Yanzhul (1896–1914).

In the last quarter of the 19th century, a gymnasium for girls was opened (named after A. S. Pushkin from 1899 onwards). Graduates of its final—pedagogical—class were qualified to work as primary school teachers.

In 1920, the Kolomna Pedagogical Technical School was established on the basis of existing teacher-training courses. In 1937, it was reorganized into the Kolomna Pedagogical College, which remained in operation until 1941. In 1939, the Kolomna Teachers' Institute was formed, which in 1953 became the Kolomna Pedagogical Institute. Finally, in March 2000, it was renamed the Kolomna State Pedagogical Institute. In 2010, the institute was renamed the Moscow State Regional Institute of Social Sciences and Humanities.

By Decree No. 281/15 of the Government of the Moscow Oblast, dated April 22, 2015, the Moscow State Regional Institute of Social Sciences and Humanities was reorganized through the incorporation of two colleges and renamed the State University of Social Sciences and Humanities. It includes two branches: the Zaraysk Pedagogical College (located in the town of Zaraysk) and the College of Pedagogy and Arts (located in the town of Yegoryevsk).
