= Results of the 2016 Russian legislative election by constituency =

Legislative election results, Russia, 2016

Legislative elections were held in Russia on 18 September 2016. Of the 450 seats in the State Duma, half were elected in single-member constituencies. The results are detailed in the table below.

== Summary ==
Out of 206 constituencies in which United Russia ran a candidate, they won 203, losing 3 contests to the Communist Party of the Russian Federation.

Out of 19 constituencies which did not have a United Russia candidate, 7 were won by A Just Russia, 5 by Liberal Democratic Party of Russia, 4 by Communist Party, and 1 each by an independent candidate, Civic Platform and Rodina.

Out of the other parties that ran candidates, the best result for Communists of Russia was the second spot in Karachay-Cherkessia, Greens came in third in Sterlitamak, People's Freedom Party came in third in Centre Moscow, Party of Growth came in second in Sevastopol, South-East, East and Center St. Petersburg, Buryatia, Kanash/Chuvashia and Udmurtia, Yabloko was second in Tushino, Leningradsky, Babushkinsky and Nagatinsky constituencies of Moscow, North-East St. Petersburg and Bryansk, Patriots of Russia was second in Seimsky constituency of Kursk and Krasnoarmeysky constituency of Volgograd. Civilian Power did not reach the top three in any constituencies.

== Results by constituency ==
No.	Constituency	Region	Candidates	Party	Votes	%
1	Adygea single-mandate constituency	Adygea	Vladislav Reznik	Independent	100,651	55.22
1	Adygea single-mandate constituency	Adygea	Yevgeny Salov	Communist Party	26,603	14.59
1	Adygea single-mandate constituency	Adygea	Nina Konovalova	Rodina	12,956	7.11
1	Adygea single-mandate constituency	Adygea	Denis Ogiyenko	Liberal Democratic Party	11,655	6.39
1	Adygea single-mandate constituency	Adygea	Alexander Loboda	A Just Russia	10,612	5.82
1	Adygea single-mandate constituency	Adygea	Sergey Gukasyan	Communists of Russia	7,016	3.85
1	Adygea single-mandate constituency	Adygea	Valery Brinikh	Greens	5,817	3.19
1	Adygea single-mandate constituency	Adygea		Invalid ballots	6,979	3.83
2	Altai single-mandate constituency	Altai	Rodion Bukachakov	United Russia	32,000	44.79
2	Altai single-mandate constituency	Altai	Viktor Romashkin	Communist Party	14,571	20.39
2	Altai single-mandate constituency	Altai	Maria Dyomina	Rodina	9,588	13.42
2	Altai single-mandate constituency	Altai	Timur Kazitov	Liberal Democratic Party	6,103	8.54
2	Altai single-mandate constituency	Altai	Urmat Knyazev	People's Freedom Party	3,523	4.93
2	Altai single-mandate constituency	Altai	Alexander Gruzdev	A Just Russia	1,969	2.76
2	Altai single-mandate constituency	Altai	Dmitry Dumnov	Yabloko	687	0.96
2	Altai single-mandate constituency	Altai	Irina Zveryako	Civilian Power	595	0.83
2	Altai single-mandate constituency	Altai	Alexander Chervov	Communists of Russia	366	0.51
2	Altai single-mandate constituency	Altai		Invalid ballots	1,431	1.99
3	Ufa single-mandate constituency	Bashkortostan	Pavel Kachkayev	United Russia	186,059	53.63
3	Ufa single-mandate constituency	Bashkortostan	Alexander Yushchenko	Communist Party	63,021	18.17
3	Ufa single-mandate constituency	Bashkortostan	Renat Minniakhmetov	Liberal Democratic Party	23,663	6.82
3	Ufa single-mandate constituency	Bashkortostan	Aigyul Baiguskarova	A Just Russia	19,691	5.68
3	Ufa single-mandate constituency	Bashkortostan	Yelena Andreeva	Greens	12,407	3.58
3	Ufa single-mandate constituency	Bashkortostan	Rais Saubanov	Patriots of Russia	11,241	3.24
3	Ufa single-mandate constituency	Bashkortostan	Boris Nurislamov	Communists of Russia	9,946	2.87
3	Ufa single-mandate constituency	Bashkortostan	Viktor Petrov	Party of Growth	8,554	2.47
3	Ufa single-mandate constituency	Bashkortostan	Fail Safin	Rodina	8,363	2.41
3	Ufa single-mandate constituency	Bashkortostan		Invalid ballots	3,961	1.14
4	Blagoveshchensk single-mandate constituency	Bashkortostan	Ildar Bikbayev	United Russia	186,444	50.55
4	Blagoveshchensk single-mandate constituency	Bashkortostan	Vyacheslav Ryabov	Liberal Democratic Party	57,008	15.46
4	Blagoveshchensk single-mandate constituency	Bashkortostan	Rustam Khafizov	Communist Party	36,253	9.83
4	Blagoveshchensk single-mandate constituency	Bashkortostan	Valiakhmet Badretdinov	A Just Russia	26,864	7.28
4	Blagoveshchensk single-mandate constituency	Bashkortostan	Rafis Kadyrov	Rodina	26,397	7.16
4	Blagoveshchensk single-mandate constituency	Bashkortostan	Oleg Likhachyov	Communists of Russia	15,988	4.33
4	Blagoveshchensk single-mandate constituency	Bashkortostan	Alla Kuzmina	Party of Growth	13,773	3.73
4	Blagoveshchensk single-mandate constituency	Bashkortostan		Invalid ballots	6,100	1.95
5	Beloretsk single-mandate constituency	Bashkortostan	Zugura Rakhmatullina	United Russia	155,315	43.80
5	Beloretsk single-mandate constituency	Bashkortostan	Ivan Sukharev	Liberal Democratic Party	71,720	20.22
5	Beloretsk single-mandate constituency	Bashkortostan	Gadzhimurad Omarov	A Just Russia	40,993	11.56
5	Beloretsk single-mandate constituency	Bashkortostan	Khanif Akhmedyanov	Communist Party	33,773	9.52
5	Beloretsk single-mandate constituency	Bashkortostan	Ildar Isangulov	Yabloko	27,449	7.74
5	Beloretsk single-mandate constituency	Bashkortostan	Khasan Idiyatullin	Communists of Russia	10,636	2.99
5	Beloretsk single-mandate constituency	Bashkortostan	Ramil Suleimanov	Rodina	5,564	1.57
5	Beloretsk single-mandate constituency	Bashkortostan	Murad Shafikov	Greens	5,273	1.49
5	Beloretsk single-mandate constituency	Bashkortostan		Invalid ballots	3,891	1.10
6	Neftekamsk single-mandate constituency	Bashkortostan	Rifat Shaykhutdinov	Civic Platform	146,324	43.99
6	Neftekamsk single-mandate constituency	Bashkortostan	Ilgam Galin	Communist Party	72,422	21.77
6	Neftekamsk single-mandate constituency	Bashkortostan	Sergey Anokhin	A Just Russia	31,040	9.33
6	Neftekamsk single-mandate constituency	Bashkortostan	Dmitry Ivanov	Liberal Democratic Party	23,830	7.16
6	Neftekamsk single-mandate constituency	Bashkortostan	Fairuza Latypova	Patriots of Russia	23,312	7.01
6	Neftekamsk single-mandate constituency	Bashkortostan	Denis Musin	Party of Growth	18,011	5.42
6	Neftekamsk single-mandate constituency	Bashkortostan	Ramil Mugalimov	Rodina	12,303	3.70
6	Neftekamsk single-mandate constituency	Bashkortostan		Invalid ballots	5,354	1.61
7	Salavat single-mandate constituency	Bashkortostan	Zarif Baiguskarov	United Russia	174,345	55.34
7	Salavat single-mandate constituency	Bashkortostan	Rail Sarbayev	A Just Russia	51,379	16.31
7	Salavat single-mandate constituency	Bashkortostan	Yunir Kutluguzhin	Communist Party	43,405	13.78
7	Salavat single-mandate constituency	Bashkortostan	Aigul Akhmetyanova	Liberal Democratic Party	17,129	5.44
7	Salavat single-mandate constituency	Bashkortostan	Nina Ramazanova	Communists of Russia	6,575	2.09
7	Salavat single-mandate constituency	Bashkortostan	Olga Sapozhnikova	Patriots of Russia	5,091	1.62
7	Salavat single-mandate constituency	Bashkortostan	Radis Gumerov	Rodina	4,542	1.44
7	Salavat single-mandate constituency	Bashkortostan	Boris Makhov	Greens	3,571	1.13
7	Salavat single-mandate constituency	Bashkortostan	Pavel Mashko	Party of Growth	2,995	0.95
7	Salavat single-mandate constituency	Bashkortostan		Invalid ballots	6,004	1.91
8	Sterlitamak single-mandate constituency	Bashkortostan	Alexey Izotov	United Russia	188,614	47.85
8	Sterlitamak single-mandate constituency	Bashkortostan	Vadim Starov	Communist Party	95,266	24.17
8	Sterlitamak single-mandate constituency	Bashkortostan	Rufina Shagapova	Greens	48,076	12.20
8	Sterlitamak single-mandate constituency	Bashkortostan	Veronika Ananyeva	Liberal Democratic Party	18,572	4.71
8	Sterlitamak single-mandate constituency	Bashkortostan	Yuri Biryuzov	Communists of Russia	16,273	4.13
8	Sterlitamak single-mandate constituency	Bashkortostan	Azamat Gubaydullin	Party of Growth	14,565	3.70
8	Sterlitamak single-mandate constituency	Bashkortostan	Nurislam Usmanov	Rodina	10,426	2.65
8	Sterlitamak single-mandate constituency	Bashkortostan		Invalid ballots	2,379	0.60
9	Buryatia single-mandate constituency	Buryatia	Aldar Damdinov	United Russia	108,128	37.56
9	Buryatia single-mandate constituency	Buryatia	Mikhail Slipenchuk	Party of Growth	65,482	22.75
9	Buryatia single-mandate constituency	Buryatia	Bair Tsyrenov	Communist Party	46,230	16.06
9	Buryatia single-mandate constituency	Buryatia	Oksana Bukholtseva	A Just Russia	31,716	11.02
9	Buryatia single-mandate constituency	Buryatia	Sergey Dorosh	Liberal Democratic Party	14,190	4.93
9	Buryatia single-mandate constituency	Buryatia	Bayar Tsydenov	Civiс Platform	9,077	3.15
9	Buryatia single-mandate constituency	Buryatia		Invalid ballots	13,056	4.54
10	North single-mandate constituency	Dagestan	Umakhan Umakhanov	United Russia	305,228	67.50
10	North single-mandate constituency	Dagestan	Dzhamal Kasumov	Independent	64,166	14.19
10	North single-mandate constituency	Dagestan	Zalimkhan Valiyev	Independent	34,806	7.70
10	North single-mandate constituency	Dagestan	Murzadin Avezov	Communist Party	19,390	4.29
10	North single-mandate constituency	Dagestan	Kamil Davdiyev	A Just Russia	8,598	1.90
10	North single-mandate constituency	Dagestan	Oleg Melnikov	Independent	6,185	1.37
10	North single-mandate constituency	Dagestan	Dzhafar Dzhafarov	Liberal Democratic Party	5,241	1.16
10	North single-mandate constituency	Dagestan	Muslim Dzhamalutdinov	Greens	3,242	0.72
10	North single-mandate constituency	Dagestan	Ruslan Magomedov	People's Freedom Party	3,026	0.67
10	North single-mandate constituency	Dagestan		Invalid ballots	2,337	0.52
11	Central single-mandate constituency	Dagestan	Abdulgamid Emirgamzayev	United Russia	460,331	88.86
11	Central single-mandate constituency	Dagestan	Makhmud Makhmudov	Communist Party	27,213	5.25
11	Central single-mandate constituency	Dagestan	Murat Paizulayev	A Just Russia	8,667	1.67
11	Central single-mandate constituency	Dagestan	Islamutdin Vagabov	Greens	8,450	1.63
11	Central single-mandate constituency	Dagestan	Timur Saidov	Communists of Russia	4,525	0.87
11	Central single-mandate constituency	Dagestan	Mazhi Sultanov	Liberal Democratic Party	3,876	0.75
11	Central single-mandate constituency	Dagestan	Islam Klichkhanov	Yabloko	2,504	0.48
11	Central single-mandate constituency	Dagestan		Invalid ballots	2,466	0.48
12	South single-mandate constituency	Dagestan	Abdulmadzhid Magramov	United Russia	334,008	68.71
12	South single-mandate constituency	Dagestan	Abusupyan Kharkharov	Independent	130,623	26.87
12	South single-mandate constituency	Dagestan	Ibragimgadzhi Ibragimgadzhiev	Patriots of Russia	3,035	0.62
12	South single-mandate constituency	Dagestan	Gadzhimurad Gadzhiyev	Communist Party	2,714	0.56
12	South single-mandate constituency	Dagestan	Gayirbeg Abdurakhmanov	Greens	1,728	0.36
12	South single-mandate constituency	Dagestan	Dada Umarov	Rodina	1,725	0.35
12	South single-mandate constituency	Dagestan	Iraskhan Dzhafarov	Liberal Democratic Party	1,504	0.31
12	South single-mandate constituency	Dagestan	Albert Esedov	Yabloko	1,500	0.31
12	South single-mandate constituency	Dagestan	Yulia Yuzik	People's Freedom Party	1,226	0.25
12	South single-mandate constituency	Dagestan	Sergey Akulinichev	A Just Russia	978	0.20
12	South single-mandate constituency	Dagestan	Vladimir Dzhikkaev	Communists of Russia	915	0.19
12	South single-mandate constituency	Dagestan		Invalid ballots	6,177	1.27
13	Ingushetia single-mandate constituency	Ingushetia	Alikhan Kharsiyev	United Russia	125,921	70.65
13	Ingushetia single-mandate constituency	Ingushetia	Abdulmazhit Martazanov	A Just Russia	18,070	10.14
13	Ingushetia single-mandate constituency	Ingushetia	Boris Yevloyev	Independent	9,011	5.06
13	Ingushetia single-mandate constituency	Ingushetia	Magamet Dzaurov	Rodina	6,872	3.86
13	Ingushetia single-mandate constituency	Ingushetia	Ilyas Bogatyryov	Communist Party	5,037	2.83
13	Ingushetia single-mandate constituency	Ingushetia	Kazbek Chemkhilgov	Greens	5,036	2.83
13	Ingushetia single-mandate constituency	Ingushetia	Islam Gadiyev	Liberal Democratic Party	4,331	2.43
13	Ingushetia single-mandate constituency	Ingushetia	Valery Borshchyov	Yabloko	2,756	1.55
13	Ingushetia single-mandate constituency	Ingushetia	Mukhamedali Guseynov	Communists of Russia	179	0.10
13	Ingushetia single-mandate constituency	Ingushetia		Invalid ballots	1,010	0.57
14	Kabardino-Balkaria single-mandate constituency	Kabardino-Balkaria	Adalbi Shkhagoshev	United Russia	241,626	50.13
14	Kabardino-Balkaria single-mandate constituency	Kabardino-Balkaria	Boris Pashtov	Communist Party	90,628	18.80
14	Kabardino-Balkaria single-mandate constituency	Kabardino-Balkaria	Ruslan Tokov	A Just Russia	76,431	15.86
14	Kabardino-Balkaria single-mandate constituency	Kabardino-Balkaria	Safarbi Shkhagapsoev	Greens	71,261	14.78
14	Kabardino-Balkaria single-mandate constituency	Kabardino-Balkaria	Khasan Zhilov	Rodina	661	0.14
14	Kabardino-Balkaria single-mandate constituency	Kabardino-Balkaria	Kamal Shavayev	Communists of Russia	526	0.11
14	Kabardino-Balkaria single-mandate constituency	Kabardino-Balkaria	Musa Tsumayev	Liberal Democratic Party	496	0.10
14	Kabardino-Balkaria single-mandate constituency	Kabardino-Balkaria	Ayshat Sultanova	Yabloko	325	0.07
14	Kabardino-Balkaria single-mandate constituency	Kabardino-Balkaria		Invalid ballots	60	0.01
15	Kalmykia single-mandate constituency	Kalmykia	Marina Mukabenova	United Russia	77,641	63.97
15	Kalmykia single-mandate constituency	Kalmykia	Lyudmila Balakleets	Communist Party	11,565	9.53
15	Kalmykia single-mandate constituency	Kalmykia	Vladimir Karuyev	Patriots of Russia	7,799	6.43
15	Kalmykia single-mandate constituency	Kalmykia	Natalia Manzhikova	A Just Russia	6,553	5.40
15	Kalmykia single-mandate constituency	Kalmykia	Semyon Ateev	Yabloko	4,841	3.99
15	Kalmykia single-mandate constituency	Kalmykia	Andrey Bessarabov	Liberal Democratic Party	4,312	3.55
15	Kalmykia single-mandate constituency	Kalmykia	Anatoly Zakharchenko	Communists of Russia	2,320	1.91
15	Kalmykia single-mandate constituency	Kalmykia	Igor Boldyrev	Rodina	1,476	1.22
15	Kalmykia single-mandate constituency	Kalmykia	Sergey Manteev	Party of Growth	1,358	1.12
15	Kalmykia single-mandate constituency	Kalmykia	Sergey Gabunschin	Greens	1,054	0.87
15	Kalmykia single-mandate constituency	Kalmykia		Invalid ballots	2,454	2.02
16	Karachay-Cherkessia single-mandate constituency	Karachay-Cherkessia	Rasul Botashev	United Russia	151,556	53.03
16	Karachay-Cherkessia single-mandate constituency	Karachay-Cherkessia	Eduard Marshankulov	Communists of Russia	71,517	25.02
16	Karachay-Cherkessia single-mandate constituency	Karachay-Cherkessia	Kemal Bytdayev	Communist Party	19,670	6.88
16	Karachay-Cherkessia single-mandate constituency	Karachay-Cherkessia	Oleg Kodzhakov	Patriots of Russia	8,830	3.09
16	Karachay-Cherkessia single-mandate constituency	Karachay-Cherkessia	Valery Ayubov	A Just Russia	8,266	2.89
16	Karachay-Cherkessia single-mandate constituency	Karachay-Cherkessia	Muradin Dzhantemirov	Greens	7,982	2.79
16	Karachay-Cherkessia single-mandate constituency	Karachay-Cherkessia	Inna Nasheva	Party of Growth	7,121	2.49
16	Karachay-Cherkessia single-mandate constituency	Karachay-Cherkessia	Akhmed Abazov	Yabloko	5,977	2.09
16	Karachay-Cherkessia single-mandate constituency	Karachay-Cherkessia	Alim Kasayev	Liberal Democratic Party	4,277	1.50
16	Karachay-Cherkessia single-mandate constituency	Karachay-Cherkessia		Invalid ballots	588	0.21
17	Karelia single-mandate constituency	Karelia	Valentina Pivnenko	United Russia	77,653	36.56
17	Karelia single-mandate constituency	Karelia	Irina Petelyaeva	A Just Russia	37,118	17.48
17	Karelia single-mandate constituency	Karelia	Boris Kashin	Communist Party	24,369	11.47
17	Karelia single-mandate constituency	Karelia	Timur Zornyakov	Liberal Democratic Party	21,776	10.25
17	Karelia single-mandate constituency	Karelia	Natalia Kiselene	Yabloko	18,983	8.94
17	Karelia single-mandate constituency	Karelia	Nikolay Tarakanov	Rodina	5,009	2.36
17	Karelia single-mandate constituency	Karelia	Yelena Gnyotova	Party of Growth	4,996	2.35
17	Karelia single-mandate constituency	Karelia	Igor Prokhorov	Patriots of Russia	4,572	2.15
17	Karelia single-mandate constituency	Karelia	Mikhail Bynkov	Greens	3,883	1.83
17	Karelia single-mandate constituency	Karelia	Alexey Malevanny	Civic Platform	2,338	1.10
17	Karelia single-mandate constituency	Karelia		Invalid ballots	11,679	5.50
18	Syktyvkar single-mandate constituency	Komi	Ivan Medvedev	United Russia	103,296	36.91
18	Syktyvkar single-mandate constituency	Komi	Tatyana Saladina	A Just Russia	49,496	17.69
18	Syktyvkar single-mandate constituency	Komi	Ivan Filipchenko	Liberal Democratic Party	43,914	15.69
18	Syktyvkar single-mandate constituency	Komi	Oleg Mikhailov	Communist Party	36,463	13.03
18	Syktyvkar single-mandate constituency	Komi	Leonid Litvak	Communists of Russia	26,820	9.58
18	Syktyvkar single-mandate constituency	Komi		Invalid ballots	19,845	7.09
19ali	Simferopol single-mandate constituency	Crimea (Note: Recognized by most members of the UN as part of Ukraine.)	Andrey Kozenko	United Russia	137,938	63.23
19ali	Simferopol single-mandate constituency	Crimea	Oleg Klimchuk	Liberal Democratic Party	24,666	11.31
19ali	Simferopol single-mandate constituency	Crimea	Yelena Gritsak	A Just Russia	15,457	7.08
19ali	Simferopol single-mandate constituency	Crimea	Alexander Chernyshyev	Communist Party	13,865	6.36
19ali	Simferopol single-mandate constituency	Crimea	Tair Abduvaliyev	Communists of Russia	7,770	3.56
19ali	Simferopol single-mandate constituency	Crimea	Nikolay Khanin	Rodina	3,070	1.41
19ali	Simferopol single-mandate constituency	Crimea	Rezeda Salikhova	Greens	2,667	1.22
19ali	Simferopol single-mandate constituency	Crimea	Alexander Talipov	Party of Growth	2,599	1.19
19ali	Simferopol single-mandate constituency	Crimea	Anatoly Azardovich	Patriots of Russia	2,572	1.18
19ali	Simferopol single-mandate constituency	Crimea		Invalid ballots	7,566	3.47
20	Kerch single-mandate constituency	Crimea	Konstantin Bakharev	United Russia	167,896	70.46
20	Kerch single-mandate constituency	Crimea	Igor Kiyko	Liberal Democratic Party	17,100	7.18
20	Kerch single-mandate constituency	Crimea	Stepan Kiskin	Communist Party	12,285	5.16
20	Kerch single-mandate constituency	Crimea	Valery Alexeev	Communists of Russia	11,608	4.87
20	Kerch single-mandate constituency	Crimea	Mikhail Voropai	A Just Russia	7,359	3.09
20	Kerch single-mandate constituency	Crimea	Andrey Pasha	Rodina	6,834	2.87
20	Kerch single-mandate constituency	Crimea	Rustem Emirov	Greens	6,265	2.63
20	Kerch single-mandate constituency	Crimea	Yury Pershikov	Patriots of Russia	1,238	0.52
20	Kerch single-mandate constituency	Crimea	Alexander Svistunov	Party of Growth	1,199	0.50
20	Kerch single-mandate constituency	Crimea		Invalid ballots	6,487	2.72
21	Yevpatoria single-mandate constituency	Crimea	Svetlana Savchenko	United Russia	189,624	72.10
21	Yevpatoria single-mandate constituency	Crimea	Pavel Shperov	Liberal Democratic Party	19,453	7.40
21	Yevpatoria single-mandate constituency	Crimea	Oleg Solomakhin	Communist Party	15,341	5.83
21	Yevpatoria single-mandate constituency	Crimea	Oleg Bekker	A Just Russia	6,948	2.64
21	Yevpatoria single-mandate constituency	Crimea	Natalia Lebedeva	Party of Growth	6,853	2.61
21	Yevpatoria single-mandate constituency	Crimea	Dmitry Shuba	Communists of Russia	5,554	2.11
21	Yevpatoria single-mandate constituency	Crimea	Vladimir Boushev	Rodina	3,976	1.51
21	Yevpatoria single-mandate constituency	Crimea	Valery Tarasov	Patriots of Russia	3,435	1.31
21	Yevpatoria single-mandate constituency	Crimea	Igor Siliverstov	Greens	3,265	1.24
21	Yevpatoria single-mandate constituency	Crimea		Invalid ballots	8,550	3.25
22	Mari El single-mandate constituency	Mari El	Sergey Kazankov	Communist Party	133,447	46.23
22	Mari El single-mandate constituency	Mari El	Larisa Yakovleva	United Russia	107,112	37.11
22	Mari El single-mandate constituency	Mari El	Oleg Kazakov	Independent	12,145	4.21
22	Mari El single-mandate constituency	Mari El	Albert Fyodorov	Liberal Democratic Party	10,162	3.52
22	Mari El single-mandate constituency	Mari El	Nataliya Glushchenko	A Just Russia	9,284	3.22
22	Mari El single-mandate constituency	Mari El	Roman Zolotukhin	Rodina	2,673	0.93
22	Mari El single-mandate constituency	Mari El	Yekaterina Ulanova	Yabloko	2,603	0.90
22	Mari El single-mandate constituency	Mari El	Yury Zonov	Greens	2,061	0.71
22	Mari El single-mandate constituency	Mari El	Denis Shparber	Communists of Russia	1,740	0.60
22	Mari El single-mandate constituency	Mari El	Andrey Smyshlyaev	Civic Platform	1,533	0.53
22	Mari El single-mandate constituency	Mari El		Invalid ballots	5,870	2.03
23	Mordovia single-mandate constituency	Mordovia	Vitaly Yefimov	United Russia	426,544	81.84
23	Mordovia single-mandate constituency	Mordovia	Yevgeny Tyurin	Liberal Democratic Party	26,365	5.06
23	Mordovia single-mandate constituency	Mordovia	Dmitry Kuzyakin	Communist Party	24,560	4.71
23	Mordovia single-mandate constituency	Mordovia	Timur Geraskin	A Just Russia	18,433	3.54
23	Mordovia single-mandate constituency	Mordovia	Armen Yeranosyan	Communists of Russia	5,070	0.97
23	Mordovia single-mandate constituency	Mordovia	Sergey Sorokin	Rodina	4,874	0.94
23	Mordovia single-mandate constituency	Mordovia	Yuliya Ivanova	Party of Growth	4,346	0.83
23	Mordovia single-mandate constituency	Mordovia	Larisa Konnova	Patriots of Russia	3,474	0.67
23	Mordovia single-mandate constituency	Mordovia	Vladimir Gridin	Yabloko	3,320	0.64
23	Mordovia single-mandate constituency	Mordovia		Invalid ballots	4,195	0.80
24	Yakut single-mandate constituency	Yakutia	Fedot Tumusov	A Just Russia	112,019	37.52
24	Yakut single-mandate constituency	Yakutia	Oleg Tarasov	Rodina	61,048	20.45
24	Yakut single-mandate constituency	Yakutia	Petr Ammosov	Communist Party	46,177	15.47
24	Yakut single-mandate constituency	Yakutia	Gavril Parakhin	Liberal Democratic Party	20,303	6.80
24	Yakut single-mandate constituency	Yakutia	Aisen Tikhonov	Party of Growth	13,366	4.48
24	Yakut single-mandate constituency	Yakutia	Alexander Lazarev	Communists of Russia	11,719	3.92
24	Yakut single-mandate constituency	Yakutia	Aital Yefremov	Greens	11,097	3.72
24	Yakut single-mandate constituency	Yakutia	Andrey Zayakin	Yabloko	8,800	2.95
24	Yakut single-mandate constituency	Yakutia		Invalid ballots	14,060	4.71
25	North Ossetia single-mandate constituency	North Ossetia	Artur Taymazov	United Russia	374,194	82.71
25	North Ossetia single-mandate constituency	North Ossetia	Gariy Kuchiyev	A Just Russia	31,007	6.85
25	North Ossetia single-mandate constituency	North Ossetia	Vladimir Pisarenko	Rodina	10,221	2.26
25	North Ossetia single-mandate constituency	North Ossetia	Soslan Bestayev	Liberal Democratic Party	9,560	2.11
25	North Ossetia single-mandate constituency	North Ossetia	Nugzar Musulbes	Communists of Russia	9,179	2.03
25	North Ossetia single-mandate constituency	North Ossetia	Ruslan Gioyev	Party of Growth	4,954	1.09
25	North Ossetia single-mandate constituency	North Ossetia	Fatima Khatsayeva	Greens	4,804	1.06
25	North Ossetia single-mandate constituency	North Ossetia	Alexey Khatagov	Yabloko	4,652	1.03
25	North Ossetia single-mandate constituency	North Ossetia		Invalid ballots	3,850	0.85
26	Privolzhsky single-mandate constituency	Tatarstan	Fatikh Sibagatullin	United Russia	248,549	70.74
26	Privolzhsky single-mandate constituency	Tatarstan	Rushaniya Bilgildeeva	A Just Russia	31,099	8.85
26	Privolzhsky single-mandate constituency	Tatarstan	Viktor Peshkov	Communist Party	25,277	7.19
26	Privolzhsky single-mandate constituency	Tatarstan	Lenar Gabdullin	Liberal Democratic Party	13,397	3.81
26	Privolzhsky single-mandate constituency	Tatarstan	Yevgeny Borodin	Rodina	11,042	3.14
26	Privolzhsky single-mandate constituency	Tatarstan	Dmitry Novikov	Communists of Russia	9,960	2.83
26	Privolzhsky single-mandate constituency	Tatarstan	Ilya Novikov	People's Freedom Party	8,746	2.49
26	Privolzhsky single-mandate constituency	Tatarstan		Invalid ballots	3,273	0.93
27	Moskovsky single-mandate constituency	Tatarstan	Ildar Gilmutdinov	United Russia	311,863	74.75
27	Moskovsky single-mandate constituency	Tatarstan	Khafiz Mirgalimov	Communist Party	49,286	11.81
27	Moskovsky single-mandate constituency	Tatarstan	Rustam Ramazanov	A Just Russia	16,324	3.91
27	Moskovsky single-mandate constituency	Tatarstan	Andrey Kudryashov	Liberal Democratic Party	15,816	3.79
27	Moskovsky single-mandate constituency	Tatarstan	Dmitry Karymov	Communists of Russia	8,710	2.09
27	Moskovsky single-mandate constituency	Tatarstan	Lyudmila Kukoba	Rodina	6,108	1.46
27	Moskovsky single-mandate constituency	Tatarstan	Marsel Shamsutdinov	People's Freedom Party	5,607	1.34
27	Moskovsky single-mandate constituency	Tatarstan		Invalid ballots	3,516	0.84
28	Nizhnekamsk single-mandate constituency	Tatarstan	Airat Khairullin	United Russia	353,675	86.19
28	Nizhnekamsk single-mandate constituency	Tatarstan	Albert Yagudin	Communist Party	19,401	4.73
28	Nizhnekamsk single-mandate constituency	Tatarstan	Damir Vildanov	A Just Russia	12,799	3.12
28	Nizhnekamsk single-mandate constituency	Tatarstan	Anna Artemyeva	Liberal Democratic Party	8,054	1.96
28	Nizhnekamsk single-mandate constituency	Tatarstan	Yevgeny Iosipov	Communists of Russia	5,213	1.27
28	Nizhnekamsk single-mandate constituency	Tatarstan	Rinat Zakirov	Independent	4,805	1.17
28	Nizhnekamsk single-mandate constituency	Tatarstan	Andrey Lukin	People's Freedom Party	4,630	1.13
28	Nizhnekamsk single-mandate constituency	Tatarstan		Invalid ballots	1,753	0.43
29	Naberezhnye Chelny single-mandate constituency	Tatarstan	Alfiya Kogogina	United Russia	316,091	76.05
29	Naberezhnye Chelny single-mandate constituency	Tatarstan	Tatyana Guryeva	Communists of Russia	40,030	9.63
29	Naberezhnye Chelny single-mandate constituency	Tatarstan	Mansur Garifullin	Communist Party	15,532	3.74
29	Naberezhnye Chelny single-mandate constituency	Tatarstan	Ramil Abdulov	A Just Russia	13,795	3.32
29	Naberezhnye Chelny single-mandate constituency	Tatarstan	Rafael Bayramov	Liberal Democratic Party	12,129	2.92
29	Naberezhnye Chelny single-mandate constituency	Tatarstan	Rafail Nurutdinov	Rodina	8,441	2.03
29	Naberezhnye Chelny single-mandate constituency	Tatarstan	Ruzil Mingalimov	People's Freedom Party	7,240	1.74
29	Naberezhnye Chelny single-mandate constituency	Tatarstan		Invalid ballots	2,364	0.57
30	Almetyevsk single-mandate constituency	Tatarstan	Rinat Khayrov	United Russia	307,016	79.19
30	Almetyevsk single-mandate constituency	Tatarstan	Alexander Agafonov	Communist Party	29,121	7.51
30	Almetyevsk single-mandate constituency	Tatarstan	Valery Aleynikov	Liberal Democratic Party	12,563	3.24
30	Almetyevsk single-mandate constituency	Tatarstan	Eduard Mukhametshin	Communists of Russia	10,635	2.74
30	Almetyevsk single-mandate constituency	Tatarstan	Zakariy Mingazov	A Just Russia	10,306	2.66
30	Almetyevsk single-mandate constituency	Tatarstan	Marat Kurbanov	Yabloko	9,881	2.55
30	Almetyevsk single-mandate constituency	Tatarstan	Airat Khanipov	Rodina	5,759	1.49
30	Almetyevsk single-mandate constituency	Tatarstan		Invalid ballots	2,408	0.62
31	Central single-mandate constituency	Tatarstan	Irshat Minkin	United Russia	180,244	63.95
31	Central single-mandate constituency	Tatarstan	Artem Prokofiev	Communist Party	30,597	10.86
31	Central single-mandate constituency	Tatarstan	Alfred Valiyev	Communists of Russia	17,336	6.15
31	Central single-mandate constituency	Tatarstan	Aigul Faizullina	A Just Russia	15,991	5.67
31	Central single-mandate constituency	Tatarstan	Marsel Gabdrakhmanov	Liberal Democratic Party	15,108	5.36
31	Central single-mandate constituency	Tatarstan	Ruslan Zinatullin	Yabloko	9,305	3.30
31	Central single-mandate constituency	Tatarstan	Maxim Krotov	Rodina	9,037	3.21
31	Central single-mandate constituency	Tatarstan		Invalid ballots	4,248	1.51
32	Tuva single-mandate constituency	Tuva	Mergen Oorzhak	United Russia	108,896	77.39
32	Tuva single-mandate constituency	Tuva	Mergen Anay-ool	Communist Party	8,949	6.36
32	Tuva single-mandate constituency	Tuva	Igor Frent	Liberal Democratic Party	5,721	4.07
32	Tuva single-mandate constituency	Tuva	Vladimir Seren-Khuurak	A Just Russia	4,587	3.26
32	Tuva single-mandate constituency	Tuva	Valery Salchak	Yabloko	4,189	2.98
32	Tuva single-mandate constituency	Tuva	Mongun-ool Mongush	People's Freedom Party	3,117	2.22
32	Tuva single-mandate constituency	Tuva	Aibek Maady	Communists of Russia	2,624	1.86
32	Tuva single-mandate constituency	Tuva		Invalid ballots	2,622	1.86
33	Udmurt single-mandate constituency	Udmurtia	Alexey Zagrebin	United Russia	110,562	43.47
33	Udmurt single-mandate constituency	Udmurtia	Alexey Chulkin	Party of Growth	46,413	18.25
33	Udmurt single-mandate constituency	Udmurtia	Vladimir Chepkasov	Communist Party	38,192	15.02
33	Udmurt single-mandate constituency	Udmurtia	Viktor Shudegov	A Just Russia	20,919	8.23
33	Udmurt single-mandate constituency	Udmurtia	Timur Yagafarov	Liberal Democratic Party	15,457	6.08
33	Udmurt single-mandate constituency	Udmurtia	Roman Dementyev	Communists of Russia	6,609	2.60
33	Udmurt single-mandate constituency	Udmurtia	Sergey Butorin	Civic Platform	3,755	1.48
33	Udmurt single-mandate constituency	Udmurtia	Ildar Zakirov	People's Freedom Party	3,370	1.33
33	Udmurt single-mandate constituency	Udmurtia		Invalid ballots	9,047	3.56
34	Izhevsk single-mandate constituency	Udmurtia	Valery Buzilov	United Russia	138,675	50.85
34	Izhevsk single-mandate constituency	Udmurtia	Vladimir Bodrov	Communist Party	42,519	15.59
34	Izhevsk single-mandate constituency	Udmurtia	Farid Yunusov	A Just Russia	36,293	13.31
34	Izhevsk single-mandate constituency	Udmurtia	Anton Gusev	Liberal Democratic Party	27,789	10.19
34	Izhevsk single-mandate constituency	Udmurtia	Yury Mishkin	Communists of Russia	8,316	3.05
34	Izhevsk single-mandate constituency	Udmurtia	Mikhail Nazarov	Yabloko	5,241	1.92
34	Izhevsk single-mandate constituency	Udmurtia	Ruslan Timurshin	People's Freedom Party	4,340	1.59
34	Izhevsk single-mandate constituency	Udmurtia		Invalid ballots	9,534	3.50
35	Khakassia single-mandate constituency	Khakassia	Nadezhda Maximova	United Russia	52,583	33.85
35	Khakassia single-mandate constituency	Khakassia	Alexander Semyonov	Communist Party	49,093	31.61
35	Khakassia single-mandate constituency	Khakassia	Dmitry Bureyev	Liberal Democratic Party	17,622	11.34
35	Khakassia single-mandate constituency	Khakassia	Lyudmila Mindibekova	A Just Russia	14,167	9.12
35	Khakassia single-mandate constituency	Khakassia	Oleg Ivanov	Yabloko	11,582	7.46
35	Khakassia single-mandate constituency	Khakassia	Viktor Veryasov	Greens	4,279	2.75
35	Khakassia single-mandate constituency	Khakassia		Invalid ballots	6,006	4.02
36	Chechnya single-mandate constituency	Chechnya	Adam Delimkhanov	United Russia	596,915	93.24
36	Chechnya single-mandate constituency	Chechnya	Ruslan Avkhadov	Communist Party	19,097	2.98
36	Chechnya single-mandate constituency	Chechnya	Ismail Denilkhanov	A Just Russia	15,089	2.36
36	Chechnya single-mandate constituency	Chechnya	Albina Fatullayeva	Liberal Democratic Party	5,657	0.88
36	Chechnya single-mandate constituency	Chechnya	Maxim Chuvashov	Communists of Russia	3,034	0.47
36	Chechnya single-mandate constituency	Chechnya		Invalid ballots	381	0.06
37	Kanash single-mandate constituency	Chuvashia	Anatoly Aksakov	A Just Russia	84,920	29.99
37	Kanash single-mandate constituency	Chuvashia	Alexander Kapitonov	Party of Growth	60,580	21.39
37	Kanash single-mandate constituency	Chuvashia	Georgy Danilov	Communist Party	38,603	13.63
37	Kanash single-mandate constituency	Chuvashia	Konstantin Stepanov	Liberal Democratic Party	24,527	8.66
37	Kanash single-mandate constituency	Chuvashia	Vladimir Mikhailov	Rodina	12,049	4.26
37	Kanash single-mandate constituency	Chuvashia	Valery Pavlov	Patriots of Russia	11,095	3.92
37	Kanash single-mandate constituency	Chuvashia	Dmitry Semyonov	People's Freedom Party	9,974	3.52
37	Kanash single-mandate constituency	Chuvashia	Anton Trefilov	Communists of Russia	9,672	3.42
37	Kanash single-mandate constituency	Chuvashia	Dmitry Sorokin	Civic Platform	5,634	1.99
37	Kanash single-mandate constituency	Chuvashia	Anton Saprykin	Yabloko	4,099	1.45
37	Kanash single-mandate constituency	Chuvashia		Invalid ballots	22,008	7.80
38	Cheboksary single-mandate constituency	Chuvashia	Leonid Cherkesov	United Russia	125,456	46.77
38	Cheboksary single-mandate constituency	Chuvashia	Oleg Nikolayev	A Just Russia	32,153	11.99
38	Cheboksary single-mandate constituency	Chuvashia	Valentin Shurchanov	Communist Party	31,881	11.18
38	Cheboksary single-mandate constituency	Chuvashia	Sergey Belobayev	Liberal Democratic Party	20,430	7.62
38	Cheboksary single-mandate constituency	Chuvashia	Sergey Shulyatyev	Communists of Russia	8,058	3.00
38	Cheboksary single-mandate constituency	Chuvashia	Oleg Nikolayev	Greens	7,567	2.82
38	Cheboksary single-mandate constituency	Chuvashia	Vladimir Mayorov	People's Freedom Party	5,204	1.94
38	Cheboksary single-mandate constituency	Chuvashia	Oleg Nikolayev	Independent	4,938	1.84
38	Cheboksary single-mandate constituency	Chuvashia	Vladislav Arkadyev	Yabloko	4,548	1.70
38	Cheboksary single-mandate constituency	Chuvashia	Andrey Kulagin	Patriots of Russia	4,099	1.53
38	Cheboksary single-mandate constituency	Chuvashia	Alexander Golitsyn	Civic Platform	3,497	1.30
38	Cheboksary single-mandate constituency	Chuvashia	Mikhail Gorbatin	Party of Growth	3,439	1.28
38	Cheboksary single-mandate constituency	Chuvashia	Nina Ryleeva	Rodina	3,257	1.21
38	Cheboksary single-mandate constituency	Chuvashia		Invalid ballots	13,737	5.12
39	Barnaul single-mandate constituency	Altai Krai	Daniil Bessarabov	United Russia	68,246	36.58
39	Barnaul single-mandate constituency	Altai Krai	Andrey Sartakov	Communist Party	29,847	15.99
39	Barnaul single-mandate constituency	Altai Krai	Andrey Shchukin	Liberal Democratic Party	25,700	13.77
39	Barnaul single-mandate constituency	Altai Krai	Alexander Molotov	A Just Russia	24,950	13.37
39	Barnaul single-mandate constituency	Altai Krai	Vladimir Ryzhkov	Yabloko	21,700	11.63
39	Barnaul single-mandate constituency	Altai Krai	Tatyana Reznikova	Civic Platform	5,498	2.95
39	Barnaul single-mandate constituency	Altai Krai	Pavel Chesnov	Party of Growth	2,949	1.58
39	Barnaul single-mandate constituency	Altai Krai		Invalid ballots	7,690	4.12
40	Rubtsovsk single-mandate constituency	Altai Krai	Viktor Zobnev	United Russia	60,873	30.90
40	Rubtsovsk single-mandate constituency	Altai Krai	Nina Ostanina	Communist Party	32,376	16.43
40	Rubtsovsk single-mandate constituency	Altai Krai	Irina Shudra	Liberal Democratic Party	32,143	16.31
40	Rubtsovsk single-mandate constituency	Altai Krai	Vladislav Vakayev	A Just Russia	31,674	16.08
40	Rubtsovsk single-mandate constituency	Altai Krai	Anton Kramskov	Communists of Russia	10,499	5.33
40	Rubtsovsk single-mandate constituency	Altai Krai	Nikolay Nazarenko	Rodina	7,968	4.04
40	Rubtsovsk single-mandate constituency	Altai Krai	Viktor Rau	Yabloko	4,620	2.34
40	Rubtsovsk single-mandate constituency	Altai Krai	Alexander Zonov	Party of Growth	3,751	1.90
40	Rubtsovsk single-mandate constituency	Altai Krai	Sergey Malykhin	Greens	3,619	1.84
40	Rubtsovsk single-mandate constituency	Altai Krai		Invalid ballots	9,494	4.82
41	Biysk single-mandate constituency	Altai Krai	Alexander Prokopyev	United Russia	68,360	36.55
41	Biysk single-mandate constituency	Altai Krai	Mariya Prusakova	Communist Party	26,696	14.27
41	Biysk single-mandate constituency	Altai Krai	Marina Osipova	A Just Russia	26,607	14.22
41	Biysk single-mandate constituency	Altai Krai	Pavel Rego	Liberal Democratic Party	26,161	13.99
41	Biysk single-mandate constituency	Altai Krai	Tatyana Astafyeva	Communists of Russia	14,735	7.88
41	Biysk single-mandate constituency	Altai Krai	Konstantin Yemeshin	Yabloko	5,388	2.88
41	Biysk single-mandate constituency	Altai Krai	Konstantin Mironenko	Greens	4,188	2.24
41	Biysk single-mandate constituency	Altai Krai	Vladimir Mikhaylyuk	Party of Growth	3,534	1.89
41	Biysk single-mandate constituency	Altai Krai	Sergey Ubrayev	Rodina	2,549	1.36
41	Biysk single-mandate constituency	Altai Krai		Invalid ballots	8,832	4.72
42	Slavgorod single-mandate constituency	Altai Krai	Ivan Loor	United Russia	78,168	40.03
42	Slavgorod single-mandate constituency	Altai Krai	Alexander Terentyev	A Just Russia	39,745	20.35
42	Slavgorod single-mandate constituency	Altai Krai	Yevgeniya Borovikova	Liberal Democratic Party	27,026	13.84
42	Slavgorod single-mandate constituency	Altai Krai	Pyotr Ponarin	Communist Party	23,971	12.27
42	Slavgorod single-mandate constituency	Altai Krai	Ivan Fursenko	Communists of Russia	5,975	3.06
42	Slavgorod single-mandate constituency	Altai Krai	Alexander Kondrov	Yabloko	5,011	2.57
42	Slavgorod single-mandate constituency	Altai Krai	Yury Bogdanov	Party of Growth	4,222	2.16
42	Slavgorod single-mandate constituency	Altai Krai	Vladimir Kirillov	Greens	3,430	1.76
42	Slavgorod single-mandate constituency	Altai Krai		Invalid ballots	7,736	3.96
43	Chita single-mandate constituency	Zabaykalsky Krai	Nikolay Govorin	United Russia	84,582	54.56
43	Chita single-mandate constituency	Zabaykalsky Krai	Yury Volkov	Liberal Democratic Party	18,939	12.22
43	Chita single-mandate constituency	Zabaykalsky Krai	Vladimir Pozdnyakov	Communist Party	15,031	9.70
43	Chita single-mandate constituency	Zabaykalsky Krai	Vyacheslav Ushakov	Patriots of Russia	10,089	6.51
43	Chita single-mandate constituency	Zabaykalsky Krai	Valery Afitsinsky	A Just Russia	8,454	5.45
43	Chita single-mandate constituency	Zabaykalsky Krai	Vyacheslav Pimenov	Communists of Russia	6,955	4.49
43	Chita single-mandate constituency	Zabaykalsky Krai	Alexander Katushev	Rodina	3,475	2.24
43	Chita single-mandate constituency	Zabaykalsky Krai		Invalid ballots	7,491	4.83
44	Daursky single-mandate constituency	Zabaykalsky Krai	Vasilina Kuliyeva	Liberal Democratic Party	71,831	44.13
44	Daursky single-mandate constituency	Zabaykalsky Krai	Yury Gayduk	Communist Party	27,213	16.72
44	Daursky single-mandate constituency	Zabaykalsky Krai	Andrey Popov	A Just Russia	20,295	12.47
44	Daursky single-mandate constituency	Zabaykalsky Krai	Oleg Fyodorov	Civic Platform	12,466	7.66
44	Daursky single-mandate constituency	Zabaykalsky Krai	Alexander Shchebenkov	Rodina	7,169	4.40
44	Daursky single-mandate constituency	Zabaykalsky Krai	Gennady Shchukin	Patriots of Russia	6,728	4.13
44	Daursky single-mandate constituency	Zabaykalsky Krai	Igor Linnik	Yabloko	3,663	2.25
44	Daursky single-mandate constituency	Zabaykalsky Krai		Invalid ballots	13,411	8.24
45	Kamchatka single-mandate constituency	Kamchatka Krai	Konstantin Slyshchenko	United Russia	35,322	38.35
45	Kamchatka single-mandate constituency	Kamchatka Krai	Valery Kalashnikov	Liberal Democratic Party	19,929	21.64
45	Kamchatka single-mandate constituency	Kamchatka Krai	Mikhail Smagin	Communist Party	10,028	10.89
45	Kamchatka single-mandate constituency	Kamchatka Krai	Mikhail Mashkovtsev	Communists of Russia	9,747	10.58
45	Kamchatka single-mandate constituency	Kamchatka Krai	Mikhail Puchkovsky	A Just Russia	7,219	7.84
45	Kamchatka single-mandate constituency	Kamchatka Krai	Vladimir Elchaparov	Yabloko	3,000	3.26
45	Kamchatka single-mandate constituency	Kamchatka Krai		Invalid ballots	6,849	7.44
46	Krasnodar single-mandate constituency	Krasnodar Krai	Vladimir Yevlanov	United Russia	97,209	50.52
46	Krasnodar single-mandate constituency	Krasnodar Krai	Sergey Obukhov	Communist Party	40,201	20.89
46	Krasnodar single-mandate constituency	Krasnodar Krai	Ilya Shakalov	Liberal Democratic Party	15,116	7.86
46	Krasnodar single-mandate constituency	Krasnodar Krai	Yury Kopachev	Party of Growth	8,481	4.41
46	Krasnodar single-mandate constituency	Krasnodar Krai	Daniel Bashmakov	A Just Russia	6,880	3.58
46	Krasnodar single-mandate constituency	Krasnodar Krai	Natalya Pogorelova	Rodina	6,648	3.46
46	Krasnodar single-mandate constituency	Krasnodar Krai	Leonid Zaprudin	People's Freedom Party	3,981	2.07
46	Krasnodar single-mandate constituency	Krasnodar Krai	Andrey Yadchenko	Greens	3,543	1.84
46	Krasnodar single-mandate constituency	Krasnodar Krai	Mikhail Abramyan	Communists of Russia	3,318	1.72
46	Krasnodar single-mandate constituency	Krasnodar Krai	Vitaly Katunin	Patriots of Russia	2,478	1.29
46	Krasnodar single-mandate constituency	Krasnodar Krai		Invalid ballots	4,558	2.37
47	Krasnoarmeysk single-mandate constituency	Krasnodar Krai	Dmitry Lameikin	United Russia	117,988	53.71
47	Krasnoarmeysk single-mandate constituency	Krasnodar Krai	Sergey Luzinov	Communist Party	29,387	13.38
47	Krasnoarmeysk single-mandate constituency	Krasnodar Krai	Denis Kumpan	Liberal Democratic Party	23,240	10.58
47	Krasnoarmeysk single-mandate constituency	Krasnodar Krai	Denis Danilchenko	A Just Russia	11,004	5.01
47	Krasnoarmeysk single-mandate constituency	Krasnodar Krai	Denis Panasenko	Rodina	7,496	3.41
47	Krasnoarmeysk single-mandate constituency	Krasnodar Krai	Natalya Ivanova	Patriots of Russia	7,277	3.31
47	Krasnoarmeysk single-mandate constituency	Krasnodar Krai	Yury Yankin	Communists of Russia	5,953	2.71
47	Krasnoarmeysk single-mandate constituency	Krasnodar Krai	Georgy Kozmenko	Greens	5,120	2.33
47	Krasnoarmeysk single-mandate constituency	Krasnodar Krai	Alexander Novikov	Party of Growth	4,452	2.03
47	Krasnoarmeysk single-mandate constituency	Krasnodar Krai	Georgy Zakharychev	Civic Platform	2,733	1.24
47	Krasnoarmeysk single-mandate constituency	Krasnodar Krai		Invalid ballots	5,027	2.29
48	Slavyansk single-mandate constituency	Krasnodar Krai	Ivan Demchenko	United Russia	147,970	63.60
48	Slavyansk single-mandate constituency	Krasnodar Krai	Anna Bobreshova	Liberal Democratic Party	20,141	8.66
48	Slavyansk single-mandate constituency	Krasnodar Krai	Dmitry Kolomiyets	Communist Party	19,188	8.25
48	Slavyansk single-mandate constituency	Krasnodar Krai	Vitaly Prytkov	A Just Russia	18,342	7.88
48	Slavyansk single-mandate constituency	Krasnodar Krai	Sergey Ketov	Communists of Russia	6,654	2.86
48	Slavyansk single-mandate constituency	Krasnodar Krai	Alexey Yegorov	Yabloko	4,810	2.07
48	Slavyansk single-mandate constituency	Krasnodar Krai	Nikolay Manyak	Rodina	2,772	1.19
48	Slavyansk single-mandate constituency	Krasnodar Krai	Yury Izmailov	Patriots of Russia	2,648	1.14
48	Slavyansk single-mandate constituency	Krasnodar Krai	Oleg Lugin	Party of Growth	2,566	1.10
48	Slavyansk single-mandate constituency	Krasnodar Krai	Mikhail Kachula	Greens	1,740	0.75
48	Slavyansk single-mandate constituency	Krasnodar Krai		Invalid ballots	5,832	2.51
49	Tuapse single-mandate constituency	Krasnodar Krai	Vladimir Sinyagovsky	United Russia	237,852	70.52
49	Tuapse single-mandate constituency	Krasnodar Krai	Alexey Trenin	Communist Party	28,206	8.36
49	Tuapse single-mandate constituency	Krasnodar Krai	Valery Khot	Liberal Democratic Party	21,794	6.46
49	Tuapse single-mandate constituency	Krasnodar Krai	Mikhail Yerokhin	A Just Russia	15,891	4.71
49	Tuapse single-mandate constituency	Krasnodar Krai	Olga Zaruba	Communists of Russia	14,006	4.15
49	Tuapse single-mandate constituency	Krasnodar Krai	Vladimir Shturkin	Rodina	7,224	2.14
49	Tuapse single-mandate constituency	Krasnodar Krai	Yevgeny Vitishko	Yabloko	7,195	2.13
49	Tuapse single-mandate constituency	Krasnodar Krai		Invalid ballots	5,119	1.52
50	Sochi single-mandate constituency	Krasnodar Krai	Konstantin Zatulin	United Russia	138,232	61.89
50	Sochi single-mandate constituency	Krasnodar Krai	Igor Vasilyev	Communist Party	27,242	12.20
50	Sochi single-mandate constituency	Krasnodar Krai	Tatyana Seredenko	Liberal Democratic Party	15,648	7.01
50	Sochi single-mandate constituency	Krasnodar Krai	Sergey Badyuk	Rodina	8,875	3.97
50	Sochi single-mandate constituency	Krasnodar Krai	Dmitry Novikov	Greens	8,014	3.59
50	Sochi single-mandate constituency	Krasnodar Krai	Igor Torosyan	A Just Russia	7,551	3.38
50	Sochi single-mandate constituency	Krasnodar Krai	Svetlana Nezhelskaya	Patriots of Russia	4,495	2.01
50	Sochi single-mandate constituency	Krasnodar Krai	Taras Yarosh	Party of Growth	4,137	1.85
50	Sochi single-mandate constituency	Krasnodar Krai	Anton Khasanov	Communists of Russia	3,426	1.53
50	Sochi single-mandate constituency	Krasnodar Krai		Invalid ballots	5,736	2.57
51	Tikhoretsk single-mandate constituency	Krasnodar Krai	Alexey Ezubov	United Russia	197,102	67.69
51	Tikhoretsk single-mandate constituency	Krasnodar Krai	Alexander Nagnibeda	Communist Party	28,336	9.73
51	Tikhoretsk single-mandate constituency	Krasnodar Krai	Nikolay Sytnik	Liberal Democratic Party	22,848	7.85
51	Tikhoretsk single-mandate constituency	Krasnodar Krai	Vladimir Karpekin	A Just Russia	15,510	5.33
51	Tikhoretsk single-mandate constituency	Krasnodar Krai	Denis Vashchenko	Party of Growth	8,955	3.08
51	Tikhoretsk single-mandate constituency	Krasnodar Krai	Ilya Khalin	Communists of Russia	7,409	2.54
51	Tikhoretsk single-mandate constituency	Krasnodar Krai	Lyudmila Lindblad	Rodina	6,873	2.36
51	Tikhoretsk single-mandate constituency	Krasnodar Krai		Invalid ballots	4,135	1.42
52	Armavir single-mandate constituency	Krasnodar Krai	Nikolay Kharitonov	Communist Party	89,871	35.23
52	Armavir single-mandate constituency	Krasnodar Krai	Andrey Frolov	A Just Russia	45,648	17.90
52	Armavir single-mandate constituency	Krasnodar Krai	Alexander Vysich	Liberal Democratic Party	34,447	13.50
52	Armavir single-mandate constituency	Krasnodar Krai	Viktoriya Guseinova	Communists of Russia	19,918	7.81
52	Armavir single-mandate constituency	Krasnodar Krai	Alexander Blagodarov	Party of Growth	17,855	7.00
52	Armavir single-mandate constituency	Krasnodar Krai	Sergey Zakipnev	Rodina	14,001	5.49
52	Armavir single-mandate constituency	Krasnodar Krai	Andrey Ovechkin	Patriots of Russia	11,066	4.34
52	Armavir single-mandate constituency	Krasnodar Krai	Denis Dvornikov	Greens	6,794	2.66
52	Armavir single-mandate constituency	Krasnodar Krai	Yevgeny Pozdeev	Yabloko	5,899	2.31
52	Armavir single-mandate constituency	Krasnodar Krai		Invalid ballots	9,583	3.76
53	Kanevskaya single-mandate constituency	Krasnodar Krai	Natalya Boyeva	United Russia	152,823	58.47
53	Kanevskaya single-mandate constituency	Krasnodar Krai	Pavel Sokolenko	Communist Party	25,919	9.92
53	Kanevskaya single-mandate constituency	Krasnodar Krai	Stanislav Vasilevsky	Liberal Democratic Party	23,318	8.92
53	Kanevskaya single-mandate constituency	Krasnodar Krai	Andrey Rudenko	A Just Russia	16,328	6.25
53	Kanevskaya single-mandate constituency	Krasnodar Krai	Alexander Turenko	Communists of Russia	9,946	3.81
53	Kanevskaya single-mandate constituency	Krasnodar Krai	Alexander Baturinets	Yabloko	9,943	3.80
53	Kanevskaya single-mandate constituency	Krasnodar Krai	Vladimir Zverev	Rodina	8,433	3.23
53	Kanevskaya single-mandate constituency	Krasnodar Krai	Andrey Tumin	Patriots of Russia	4,981	1.91
53	Kanevskaya single-mandate constituency	Krasnodar Krai	Oleg Kerimov	Party of Growth	3,242	1.24
53	Kanevskaya single-mandate constituency	Krasnodar Krai		Invalid ballots	6,431	2.46
54	Krasnoyarsk single-mandate constituency	Krasnoyarsk Krai	Yury Shvytkin	United Russia	83,257	44.21
54	Krasnoyarsk single-mandate constituency	Krasnoyarsk Krai	Sergey Titov	Liberal Democratic Party	21,799	11.58
54	Krasnoyarsk single-mandate constituency	Krasnoyarsk Krai	Alexey Slonov	Communist Party	21,557	11.45
54	Krasnoyarsk single-mandate constituency	Krasnoyarsk Krai	Vladimir Vladimirov	Patriots of Russia	15,204	8.07
54	Krasnoyarsk single-mandate constituency	Krasnoyarsk Krai	Andrey Zberovsky	A Just Russia	10,618	5.64
54	Krasnoyarsk single-mandate constituency	Krasnoyarsk Krai	Tatyana Osipova	Communists of Russia	10,587	5.62
54	Krasnoyarsk single-mandate constituency	Krasnoyarsk Krai	Alexander Gornostayev	Rodina	5,794	3.08
54	Krasnoyarsk single-mandate constituency	Krasnoyarsk Krai	Artyom Tarasov	Yabloko	5,578	2.96
54	Krasnoyarsk single-mandate constituency	Krasnoyarsk Krai	Sergey Shakhmatov	Greens	3,494	1.86
54	Krasnoyarsk single-mandate constituency	Krasnoyarsk Krai		Invalid ballots	10,417	5.53
55	Central single-mandate constituency	Krasnoyarsk Krai	Pyotr Pimashkov	United Russia	75,957	40.78
55	Central single-mandate constituency	Krasnoyarsk Krai	Alexander Gliskov	Liberal Democratic Party	34,202	18.36
55	Central single-mandate constituency	Krasnoyarsk Krai	Ivan Serebryakov	Patriots of Russia	21,661	11.63
55	Central single-mandate constituency	Krasnoyarsk Krai	Pyotr Vychuzhanin	Communist Party	18,622	10.00
55	Central single-mandate constituency	Krasnoyarsk Krai	Maxim Merkert	A Just Russia	7,885	4.23
55	Central single-mandate constituency	Krasnoyarsk Krai	Nataliya Podolyak	Greens	6,053	3.25
55	Central single-mandate constituency	Krasnoyarsk Krai	Anton Gurov	Communists of Russia	5,870	3.15
55	Central single-mandate constituency	Krasnoyarsk Krai	Yevgeny Baburin	People's Freedom Party	3,799	2.04
55	Central single-mandate constituency	Krasnoyarsk Krai	Anatoly Urdayev	Rodina	3,205	1.72
55	Central single-mandate constituency	Krasnoyarsk Krai		Invalid ballots	9,006	4.84
56	Divnogorsk single-mandate constituency	Krasnoyarsk Krai	Viktor Zubarev	United Russia	90,661	40.95
56	Divnogorsk single-mandate constituency	Krasnoyarsk Krai	Dmitri Nossov	Communist Party	38,318	17.31
56	Divnogorsk single-mandate constituency	Krasnoyarsk Krai	Roman Ulskikh	Liberal Democratic Party	21,818	9.85
56	Divnogorsk single-mandate constituency	Krasnoyarsk Krai	Gennady Semigin	Patriots of Russia	19,281	8.71
56	Divnogorsk single-mandate constituency	Krasnoyarsk Krai	Irina Ivanova	Communists of Russia	13,608	6.15
56	Divnogorsk single-mandate constituency	Krasnoyarsk Krai	Maxim Zolotukhin	A Just Russia	10,776	4.87
56	Divnogorsk single-mandate constituency	Krasnoyarsk Krai	Yaroslav Pitersky	Yabloko	5,741	2.59
56	Divnogorsk single-mandate constituency	Krasnoyarsk Krai	Sergey Yerbyagin	Greens	4,945	2.23
56	Divnogorsk single-mandate constituency	Krasnoyarsk Krai	Valentina Ulyanova	Civic Platform	3,517	1.59
56	Divnogorsk single-mandate constituency	Krasnoyarsk Krai		Invalid ballots	12,747	5.76
57	Yeniseysk single-mandate constituency	Krasnoyarsk Krai	Raisa Karmazina	United Russia	91,725	48.41
57	Yeniseysk single-mandate constituency	Krasnoyarsk Krai	Sergey Natarov	Liberal Democratic Party	25,410	13.41
57	Yeniseysk single-mandate constituency	Krasnoyarsk Krai	Pyotr Polezhayev	Communist Party	20,534	10.84
57	Yeniseysk single-mandate constituency	Krasnoyarsk Krai	Alexander Dyakov	Rodina	10,341	5.46
57	Yeniseysk single-mandate constituency	Krasnoyarsk Krai	Andrey Seleznyov	Communists of Russia	9,215	4.86
57	Yeniseysk single-mandate constituency	Krasnoyarsk Krai	Alexander Lympio	A Just Russia	7,583	4.00
57	Yeniseysk single-mandate constituency	Krasnoyarsk Krai	Olga Lanovaya	Civic Platform	4,890	2.58
57	Yeniseysk single-mandate constituency	Krasnoyarsk Krai	Tatyana Rykunova	Patriots of Russia	4,863	2.57
57	Yeniseysk single-mandate constituency	Krasnoyarsk Krai	Artyom Kardanets	Greens	4,324	2.28
57	Yeniseysk single-mandate constituency	Krasnoyarsk Krai		Invalid ballots	10,603	5.60
58	Perm single-mandate constituency	Perm Krai	Vladimir Alikin	A Just Russia	21,460	12.2
58	Perm single-mandate constituency	Perm Krai	Almir Amayev	People's Freedom Party	4,093	2.3
58	Perm single-mandate constituency	Perm Krai	Oleg Myasnikov	Yabloko	6,432	3.7
58	Perm single-mandate constituency	Perm Krai	Viktor Pokhmelkin	Party of Growth	17,968	10.2
58	Perm single-mandate constituency	Perm Krai	Olga Rogozhnikova	Liberal Democratic Party	20,009	11.4
58	Perm single-mandate constituency	Perm Krai	Alexey Selyutin	Communist Party	18,758	10.7
58	Perm single-mandate constituency	Perm Krai	Yevgeny Skobelin	Communists of Russia	5,618	3.2
58	Perm single-mandate constituency	Perm Krai	Andrey Tribunsky	Greens	3,927	2.2
58	Perm single-mandate constituency	Perm Krai	Igor Shubin	United Russia	77,418	44.1
59	Chusovoy single-mandate constituency	Perm Krai	Alexey Burnashov	United Russia	80,904	49.8
59	Chusovoy single-mandate constituency	Perm Krai	Irina Volynets	A Just Russia	19,518	12.0
59	Chusovoy single-mandate constituency	Perm Krai	Yury Pimkin	Communists of Russia	10,515	6.5
59	Chusovoy single-mandate constituency	Perm Krai	Stepan Podaruyev	Rodina	2,654	1.6
59	Chusovoy single-mandate constituency	Perm Krai	Alexey Ruban	Patriots of Russia	2,632	1.6
59	Chusovoy single-mandate constituency	Perm Krai	Irina Sadilova	Yabloko	9,599	5.9
59	Chusovoy single-mandate constituency	Perm Krai	Yevgeny Sivtsev	Liberal Democratic Party	17,928	11.0
59	Chusovoy single-mandate constituency	Perm Krai	Raisa Simonova	People's Freedom Party	3,431	2.1
59	Chusovoy single-mandate constituency	Perm Krai	Gennady Storozhev	Communist Party	15,315	9.4
60	Kungur single-mandate constituency	Perm Krai	Nadezhda Agisheva	Yabloko	12,148	6.9
60	Kungur single-mandate constituency	Perm Krai	Vladimir Grebenyuk	Communist Party	22,281	12.7
60	Kungur single-mandate constituency	Perm Krai	Sergey Zlobin	A Just Russia	17,647	10.0
60	Kungur single-mandate constituency	Perm Krai	Alexey Zolotaryov	Liberal Democratic Party	23,976	13.6
60	Kungur single-mandate constituency	Perm Krai	Yevgeny Zubov	Rodina	3,200	2.0
60	Kungur single-mandate constituency	Perm Krai	Anton Lyubich	Party of Growth	3,568	2.0
60	Kungur single-mandate constituency	Perm Krai	Alexander Mishchenkov	People's Freedom Party	2,883	1.6
60	Kungur single-mandate constituency	Perm Krai	Dmitry Skrivanov	United Russia	82,656	46.9
60	Kungur single-mandate constituency	Perm Krai	Alexander Sozinov	Communists of Russia	7,700	4.4
61	Kudymkar single-mandate constituency	Perm Krai	Tatyana Kamenskikh	Liberal Democratic Party	23,606	15.9
61	Kudymkar single-mandate constituency	Perm Krai	Olga Kolokolova	Yabloko	10,153	6.8
61	Kudymkar single-mandate constituency	Perm Krai	Valentin Murzayev	People's Freedom Party	2,686	1.8
61	Kudymkar single-mandate constituency	Perm Krai	Dmitry Sazonov	United Russia	62,859	42.3
61	Kudymkar single-mandate constituency	Perm Krai	Vitaly Tytyanevich	Communists of Russia	8,095	5.5
61	Kudymkar single-mandate constituency	Perm Krai	Irina Filatova	Communist Party	18,400	12.4
61	Kudymkar single-mandate constituency	Perm Krai	Darya Aisfeld	A Just Russia	22,637	15.3
62	Vladivostok single-mandate constituency	Primorsky Krai	Andrey Andreychenko	Liberal Democratic Party	21,498	12.4
62	Vladivostok single-mandate constituency	Primorsky Krai	Anatoly Dolgachyov	Communist Party	24,851	14.3
62	Vladivostok single-mandate constituency	Primorsky Krai	Vitaly Libanov	Communists of Russia	7,111	4.1
62	Vladivostok single-mandate constituency	Primorsky Krai	Nikolay Markovtsev	Yabloko	6,209	3.6
62	Vladivostok single-mandate constituency	Primorsky Krai	Oleg Pak	Party of Growth	12,546	7.2
62	Vladivostok single-mandate constituency	Primorsky Krai	Alexander Perednya	A Just Russia	15,034	8.7
62	Vladivostok single-mandate constituency	Primorsky Krai	Sergey Sopchuk	United Russia	72,367	41.6
62	Vladivostok single-mandate constituency	Primorsky Krai	Viktor Cherepkov	Rodina	14,145	8.1
63	Artyom single-mandate constituency	Primorsky Krai	Larisa Butenko	Party of Growth	7,685	4.7
63	Artyom single-mandate constituency	Primorsky Krai	Viktor Kaplunenko	Rodina	4,076	2.5
63	Artyom single-mandate constituency	Primorsky Krai	Alexey Klyotskin	Yabloko	4,993	3.0
63	Artyom single-mandate constituency	Primorsky Krai	Alexey Kozitsky	A Just Russia	14,559	8.9
63	Artyom single-mandate constituency	Primorsky Krai	Olga Kolchina	Communists of Russia	15,341	9.4
63	Artyom single-mandate constituency	Primorsky Krai	Alexey Kornienko	Communist Party	26,392	16.1
63	Artyom single-mandate constituency	Primorsky Krai	Roman Meleshkin	Liberal Democratic Party	21,900	13.4
63	Artyom single-mandate constituency	Primorsky Krai	Vladimir Novikov	United Russia	65,877	40.2
63	Artyom single-mandate constituency	Primorsky Krai	Vladimir Shcherbatyuk	Greens	2,951	1.8
64	Arsenyev single-mandate constituency	Primorsky Krai	Vladimir Grishukov	Communist Party	41,572	23.5
64	Arsenyev single-mandate constituency	Primorsky Krai	Grigory Zhurlov	Rodina	5,049	2.9
64	Arsenyev single-mandate constituency	Primorsky Krai	Yevgeny Zotov	Liberal Democratic Party	30,778	17.4
64	Arsenyev single-mandate constituency	Primorsky Krai	Valery Mishkin	A Just Russia	13,825	7.8
64	Arsenyev single-mandate constituency	Primorsky Krai	Viktoriya Nikolaeva	United Russia	71,190	40.2
64	Arsenyev single-mandate constituency	Primorsky Krai	Pavel Sulyandziga	Yabloko	5,814	3.3
64	Arsenyev single-mandate constituency	Primorsky Krai	Dmitry Frolov	Communists of Russia	8,920	5.0
65	Stavropol single-mandate constituency	Stavropol Krai	Vasily Avdeyev	Greens	5,120	2.4
65	Stavropol single-mandate constituency	Stavropol Krai	Olga Drozdova	Liberal Democratic Party	34,759	16.5
65	Stavropol single-mandate constituency	Stavropol Krai	Alexander Kuzmin	A Just Russia	17,207	8.2
65	Stavropol single-mandate constituency	Stavropol Krai	Mikhail Kuzmin	United Russia	109,797	52.1
65	Stavropol single-mandate constituency	Stavropol Krai	Sergey Kulagin	Patriots of Russia	3,477	1.7
65	Stavropol single-mandate constituency	Stavropol Krai	Pavel Lebedev	People's Freedom Party	3,054	1.4
65	Stavropol single-mandate constituency	Stavropol Krai	Yevgeny Mokhov	Rodina	2,893	1.4
65	Stavropol single-mandate constituency	Stavropol Krai	Yury Rukosuyev	Communists of Russia	7,931	3.8
65	Stavropol single-mandate constituency	Stavropol Krai	Nikolay Sasin	Party of Growth	4,292	2.0
65	Stavropol single-mandate constituency	Stavropol Krai	Viktor Sobolev	Communist Party	22,134	10.5
66	Nevinnomyssk single-mandate constituency	Stavropol Krai	Georgy Bolshov	Patriots of Russia	3,951	2.0
66	Nevinnomyssk single-mandate constituency	Stavropol Krai	Viktor Goncharov	Communist Party	28,039	14.0
66	Nevinnomyssk single-mandate constituency	Stavropol Krai	Sergey Gorlo	A Just Russia	15,543	7.8
66	Nevinnomyssk single-mandate constituency	Stavropol Krai	Ilya Drozdov	Liberal Democratic Party	27,063	13.5
66	Nevinnomyssk single-mandate constituency	Stavropol Krai	Viktor Ilyinov	Greens	4,565	2.3
66	Nevinnomyssk single-mandate constituency	Stavropol Krai	Alexander Ishchenko	United Russia	101,595	50.8
66	Nevinnomyssk single-mandate constituency	Stavropol Krai	Ivan Kolesnikov	Communists of Russia	7,911	4.0
66	Nevinnomyssk single-mandate constituency	Stavropol Krai	Valery Ledovskoy	Yabloko	4,406	2.2
66	Nevinnomyssk single-mandate constituency	Stavropol Krai	Vladimir Nazarenko	Rodina	3,352	1.7
66	Nevinnomyssk single-mandate constituency	Stavropol Krai	Vladimir Smirnov	Party of Growth	3,588	1.8
67	Mineralnye Vody single-mandate constituency	Stavropol Krai	Olga Kazakova	United Russia	98,200	56.2
67	Mineralnye Vody single-mandate constituency	Stavropol Krai	Kirill Kuzmin	A Just Russia	14,990	8.6
67	Mineralnye Vody single-mandate constituency	Stavropol Krai	Alexey Kursish	Yabloko	3,331	1.9
67	Mineralnye Vody single-mandate constituency	Stavropol Krai	Marat Marshankulov	Communists of Russia	6,190	3.5
67	Mineralnye Vody single-mandate constituency	Stavropol Krai	Yevgeny Nikitin	Greens	5,290	3.0
67	Mineralnye Vody single-mandate constituency	Stavropol Krai	Andrey Petlitsyn	Party of Growth	2,685	1.5
67	Mineralnye Vody single-mandate constituency	Stavropol Krai	Mikhail Serkov	Rodina	3,431	2.0
67	Mineralnye Vody single-mandate constituency	Stavropol Krai	Valery Smolyakov	Communist Party	18,742	10.7
67	Mineralnye Vody single-mandate constituency	Stavropol Krai	Alexander Sysoev	Liberal Democratic Party	21,727	12.4
68	Georgiyevsk single-mandate constituency	Stavropol Krai	Yevgeny Bolkhovitin	A Just Russia	10,261	5.5
68	Georgiyevsk single-mandate constituency	Stavropol Krai	Yelena Bondarenko	United Russia	113,501	61.0
68	Georgiyevsk single-mandate constituency	Stavropol Krai	Georgy Dzasokhov	Greens	3,250	1.7
68	Georgiyevsk single-mandate constituency	Stavropol Krai	Viktor Lozovoy	Communist Party	27,470	14.8
68	Georgiyevsk single-mandate constituency	Stavropol Krai	Nikolay Lyashenko	Yabloko	5,348	2.9
68	Georgiyevsk single-mandate constituency	Stavropol Krai	Mikhail Seredenko	Rodina	2,427	1.3
68	Georgiyevsk single-mandate constituency	Stavropol Krai	Denis Slinko	Party of Growth	2,940	1.6
68	Georgiyevsk single-mandate constituency	Stavropol Krai	Alexander Chernogorov	Liberal Democratic Party	16,831	9.0
68	Georgiyevsk single-mandate constituency	Stavropol Krai	Alina Chikatueva	Communists of Russia	4,108	2.2
69	Khabarovsk single-mandate constituency	Khabarovsk Krai	Yelena Astashova	Yabloko	10,367	5.6
69	Khabarovsk single-mandate constituency	Khabarovsk Krai	Alexey Vorsin	People's Freedom Party	5,525	3.0
69	Khabarovsk single-mandate constituency	Khabarovsk Krai	Boris Gladkikh	United Russia	71,086	38.7
69	Khabarovsk single-mandate constituency	Khabarovsk Krai	Igor Glukhov	A Just Russia	13,939	7.6
69	Khabarovsk single-mandate constituency	Khabarovsk Krai	Yelena Greshnyakova	Liberal Democratic Party	40,074	21.8
69	Khabarovsk single-mandate constituency	Khabarovsk Krai	Andrey Petrov	Greens	5,374	2.9
69	Khabarovsk single-mandate constituency	Khabarovsk Krai	Viktor Postnikov	Communist Party	30,680	16.7
69	Khabarovsk single-mandate constituency	Khabarovsk Krai	Vladimir Titorenko	Communists of Russia	6,722	3.7
70	Komsomolsk-na-Amure single-mandate constituency	Khabarovsk Krai	Vadim Voevodin	Communist Party	38,876	24.3
70	Komsomolsk-na-Amure single-mandate constituency	Khabarovsk Krai	Dmitry Doskov	Communists of Russia	10,171	6.4
70	Komsomolsk-na-Amure single-mandate constituency	Khabarovsk Krai	Oleg Pankov	Yabloko	9,384	5.9
70	Komsomolsk-na-Amure single-mandate constituency	Khabarovsk Krai	Alexander Simontsev	People's Freedom Party	3,509	2.2
70	Komsomolsk-na-Amure single-mandate constituency	Khabarovsk Krai	Yevgeny Sysoev	A Just Russia	27,245	17.0
70	Komsomolsk-na-Amure single-mandate constituency	Khabarovsk Krai	Sergey Furgal	Liberal Democratic Party	63,906	39.9
70	Komsomolsk-na-Amure single-mandate constituency	Khabarovsk Krai	Eduard Shvetsov	Rodina	7,043	4.4
71	Amur single-mandate constituency	Amur Oblast	Ivan Abramov	Liberal Democratic Party	123,762	49.1
71	Amur single-mandate constituency	Amur Oblast	Roman Barilo	Rodina	12,411	4.9
71	Amur single-mandate constituency	Amur Oblast	Yevgeny Volkov	Communists of Russia	18,335	7.3
71	Amur single-mandate constituency	Amur Oblast	Kirill Zimin	A Just Russia	26,894	10.7
71	Amur single-mandate constituency	Amur Oblast	Natalya Kalinina	Yabloko	13,013	5.2
71	Amur single-mandate constituency	Amur Oblast	Roman Kobyzov	Communist Party	46,571	18.5
71	Amur single-mandate constituency	Amur Oblast	Valery Parshinkov	Greens	10,941	4.3
72	Arkhangelsk single-mandate constituency	Arkhangelsk Oblast	Mikhail Butorin	People's Freedom Party	4,645	3.0
72	Arkhangelsk single-mandate constituency	Arkhangelsk Oblast	Olga Yepifanova	A Just Russia	38,742	25.1
72	Arkhangelsk single-mandate constituency	Arkhangelsk Oblast	Vyacheslav Yerykalov	Patriots of Russia	1,958	1.3
72	Arkhangelsk single-mandate constituency	Arkhangelsk Oblast	Alexander Novikov	Communist Party	22,576	14.6
72	Arkhangelsk single-mandate constituency	Arkhangelsk Oblast	Sergey Pivkov	Liberal Democratic Party	20,709	13.4
72	Arkhangelsk single-mandate constituency	Arkhangelsk Oblast	Yury Rusakov	Communists of Russia	2,543	1.6
72	Arkhangelsk single-mandate constituency	Arkhangelsk Oblast	Mikhail Silantyev	Rodina	4,535	2.9
72	Arkhangelsk single-mandate constituency	Arkhangelsk Oblast	Andrey Churakov	Yabloko	3,797	2.5
72	Arkhangelsk single-mandate constituency	Arkhangelsk Oblast	Dmitry Yurkov	United Russia	55,025	35.6
73	Kotlas single-mandate constituency	Arkhangelsk Oblast	Igor Arsentyev	Liberal Democratic Party	20,865	12.3
73	Kotlas single-mandate constituency	Arkhangelsk Oblast	Alexey Guryev	Rodina	4,558	2.7
73	Kotlas single-mandate constituency	Arkhangelsk Oblast	Andrey Zhadchenko	Patriots of Russia	1,801	1.1
73	Kotlas single-mandate constituency	Arkhangelsk Oblast	Vasily Pavlov	Communist Party	18,581	10.9
73	Kotlas single-mandate constituency	Arkhangelsk Oblast	Andrey Palkin	United Russia	76,004	44.7
73	Kotlas single-mandate constituency	Arkhangelsk Oblast	Roman Fedulov	Communists of Russia	2,705	1.6
73	Kotlas single-mandate constituency	Arkhangelsk Oblast	Yury Chesnokov	Yabloko	5,260	3.1
73	Kotlas single-mandate constituency	Arkhangelsk Oblast	Irina Chirkova	A Just Russia	40,135	23.6
74	Astrakhan single-mandate constituency	Astrakhan Oblast	Nikolay Arefiev	Communist Party	30,281	11.8
74	Astrakhan single-mandate constituency	Astrakhan Oblast	Yegor Vostrikov	Liberal Democratic Party	17,543	6.8
74	Astrakhan single-mandate constituency	Astrakhan Oblast	Mikhail Doliev	People's Freedom Party	3,263	1.3
74	Astrakhan single-mandate constituency	Astrakhan Oblast	Yegor Kovalyov	Communists of Russia	6,236	2.4
74	Astrakhan single-mandate constituency	Astrakhan Oblast	Nailya Nikitina	Party of Growth	4,690	1.8
74	Astrakhan single-mandate constituency	Astrakhan Oblast	Leonid Ogul	United Russia	103,739	40.4
74	Astrakhan single-mandate constituency	Astrakhan Oblast	Sergey Rodionov	Greens	2,848	1.1
74	Astrakhan single-mandate constituency	Astrakhan Oblast	Oleg Shein	A Just Russia	88,257	34.4
75	Belgorod single-mandate constituency	Belgorod Oblast	Sergey Bozhenov	United Russia	188,964	54.4
75	Belgorod single-mandate constituency	Belgorod Oblast	Vera Porkhun	Greens	8,373	2.4
75	Belgorod single-mandate constituency	Belgorod Oblast	Andrey Svishchyov	Rodina	8,008	2.3
75	Belgorod single-mandate constituency	Belgorod Oblast	Yury Selivanov	A Just Russia	43,892	12.6
75	Belgorod single-mandate constituency	Belgorod Oblast	Alexander Starovoitov	Liberal Democratic Party	34,286	9.9
75	Belgorod single-mandate constituency	Belgorod Oblast	Ruslan Khoroshilov	Communists of Russia	18,002	5.2
75	Belgorod single-mandate constituency	Belgorod Oblast	Nataliya Chernyshova	Civic Platform	10,659	3.1
75	Belgorod single-mandate constituency	Belgorod Oblast	Valery Shevlyakov	Communist Party	34,882	10.1
76	Stary Oskol single-mandate constituency	Belgorod Oblast	Valery Borisovsky	Independent	5,459	1.4
76	Stary Oskol single-mandate constituency	Belgorod Oblast	Sergey Bocharnikov	A Just Russia	19,583	5.1
76	Stary Oskol single-mandate constituency	Belgorod Oblast	Konstantin Klimashevsky	Liberal Democratic Party	21,138	5.5
76	Stary Oskol single-mandate constituency	Belgorod Oblast	Andrey Maysak	Civic Platform	2,792	0.7
76	Stary Oskol single-mandate constituency	Belgorod Oblast	Stanislav Panov	Communist Party	37,024	9.7
76	Stary Oskol single-mandate constituency	Belgorod Oblast	Andrei Skoch	United Russia	283,931	74.4
76	Stary Oskol single-mandate constituency	Belgorod Oblast	Alexander Sobolev	Rodina	3,625	1.0
76	Stary Oskol single-mandate constituency	Belgorod Oblast	Dmitry Fedorchenko	Communists of Russia	7,986	2.1
77	Bryansk single-mandate constituency	Bryansk Oblast	Alexey Alkhimov	Patriots of Russia	3,973	1.4
77	Bryansk single-mandate constituency	Bryansk Oblast	Alexander Bogomaz	Yabloko	29,684	10.5
77	Bryansk single-mandate constituency	Bryansk Oblast	Dmitry Vinokurov	Liberal Democratic Party	25,644	9.0
77	Bryansk single-mandate constituency	Bryansk Oblast	Vladimir Zhutenkov	United Russia	166,146	58.6
77	Bryansk single-mandate constituency	Bryansk Oblast	Dmitry Kornilov	Civic Platform	2,450	0.9
77	Bryansk single-mandate constituency	Bryansk Oblast	Mikhail Lelebin	Party of Growth	3,191	1.1
77	Bryansk single-mandate constituency	Bryansk Oblast	Roman Lobzin	Rodina	3,563	1.3
77	Bryansk single-mandate constituency	Bryansk Oblast	Konstantin Pavlov	Communist Party	27,840	9.8
77	Bryansk single-mandate constituency	Bryansk Oblast	Artyom Suvorov	Civilian Power	2,365	0.8
77	Bryansk single-mandate constituency	Bryansk Oblast	Valery Khramchenkov	A Just Russia	9,640	3.4
77	Bryansk single-mandate constituency	Bryansk Oblast	Yelena Shanina	Communists of Russia	9,090	3.2
78	Unecha single-mandate constituency	Bryansk Oblast	Andrey Arkhitsky	Communist Party	32,745	12.7
78	Unecha single-mandate constituency	Bryansk Oblast	Sergey Gorelov	Party of Growth	3,763	1.5
78	Unecha single-mandate constituency	Bryansk Oblast	Vadim Kanichev	Patriots of Russia	2,795	1.1
78	Unecha single-mandate constituency	Bryansk Oblast	Viktor Kiselyov	Liberal Democratic Party	26,007	10.1
78	Unecha single-mandate constituency	Bryansk Oblast	Olga Makhotina	Yabloko	5,080	2.0
78	Unecha single-mandate constituency	Bryansk Oblast	Alexander Medvedkov	A Just Russia	10,156	3.9
78	Unecha single-mandate constituency	Bryansk Oblast	Ivan Medved	Rodina	19,073	7.4
78	Unecha single-mandate constituency	Bryansk Oblast	Valentina Mironova	United Russia	158,125	61.3
79	Vladimir single-mandate constituency	Vladimir Oblast	Alexey Avdokhin	Rodina	4,099	1.9
79	Vladimir single-mandate constituency	Vladimir Oblast	Larisa Yemelyanova	Communist Party	26,880	12.4
79	Vladimir single-mandate constituency	Vladimir Oblast	Alexey Yefremov	Yabloko	4,769	2.2
79	Vladimir single-mandate constituency	Vladimir Oblast	Igor Igoshin	United Russia	119,349	54.9
79	Vladimir single-mandate constituency	Vladimir Oblast	Sergey Kazakov	Civic Platform	9,351	4.3
79	Vladimir single-mandate constituency	Vladimir Oblast	Kirill Kovalyov	Greens	3,242	1.5
79	Vladimir single-mandate constituency	Vladimir Oblast	Alexey Mayorov	Party of Growth	4,725	2.2
79	Vladimir single-mandate constituency	Vladimir Oblast	Timur Markov	A Just Russia	15,746	7.2
79	Vladimir single-mandate constituency	Vladimir Oblast	Sergey Petukhov	Communists of Russia	6,703	3.1
79	Vladimir single-mandate constituency	Vladimir Oblast	Vladimir Sipyagin	Liberal Democratic Party	22,592	10.4
80	Suzdal single-mandate constituency	Vladimir Oblast	Grigory Anikeyev	United Russia	138,311	66.8
80	Suzdal single-mandate constituency	Vladimir Oblast	Valery Belyakov	A Just Russia	16,028	7.7
80	Suzdal single-mandate constituency	Vladimir Oblast	Lyudmila Bundina	Communist Party	21,167	10.2
80	Suzdal single-mandate constituency	Vladimir Oblast	Sergey Klopov	Communists of Russia	4,223	2.0
80	Suzdal single-mandate constituency	Vladimir Oblast	Anna Kolesnik	Civilian Power	1,823	0.9
80	Suzdal single-mandate constituency	Vladimir Oblast	Dmitry Kushpita	Yabloko	4,937	2.4
80	Suzdal single-mandate constituency	Vladimir Oblast	Kirill Nikolenko	People's Freedom Party	2,673	1.3
80	Suzdal single-mandate constituency	Vladimir Oblast	Ilya Potapov	Liberal Democratic Party	15,130	7.3
80	Suzdal single-mandate constituency	Vladimir Oblast	Alexey Usachev	Rodina	2,774	1.3
81	Volgograd single-mandate constituency	Volgograd Oblast	Anatoly Barankevich	Patriots of Russia	8,813	4.5
81	Volgograd single-mandate constituency	Volgograd Oblast	Sergey Dorokhov	Communists of Russia	7,639	3.9
81	Volgograd single-mandate constituency	Volgograd Oblast	Sergey Korostin	Yabloko	3,822	2.0
81	Volgograd single-mandate constituency	Volgograd Oblast	Anna Kuvychko	United Russia	83,653	43.0
81	Volgograd single-mandate constituency	Volgograd Oblast	Oleg Mikheev	A Just Russia	18,185	9.4
81	Volgograd single-mandate constituency	Volgograd Oblast	Dmitry Nikitin	People's Freedom Party	3,680	1.9
81	Volgograd single-mandate constituency	Volgograd Oblast	Eduard Protopopov	Greens	3,223	1.7
81	Volgograd single-mandate constituency	Volgograd Oblast	Mikhail Tarantsov	Communist Party	44,692	23.0
81	Volgograd single-mandate constituency	Volgograd Oblast	Yury Chekalin	Liberal Democratic Party	20,622	10.6
82	Krasnoarmeysky single-mandate constituency	Volgograd Oblast	Galina Boldyreva	Yabloko	7,131	3.9
82	Krasnoarmeysky single-mandate constituency	Volgograd Oblast	Alexey Burov	Communist Party	23,741	13.0
82	Krasnoarmeysky single-mandate constituency	Volgograd Oblast	Dmitry Kalashnikov	A Just Russia	19,301	10.6
82	Krasnoarmeysky single-mandate constituency	Volgograd Oblast	Dmitry Krylov	Patriots of Russia	25,906	14.2
82	Krasnoarmeysky single-mandate constituency	Volgograd Oblast	Vadim Merkulov	People's Freedom Party	2,729	1.5
82	Krasnoarmeysky single-mandate constituency	Volgograd Oblast	Oleg Orlov	Liberal Democratic Party	19,313	10.6
82	Krasnoarmeysky single-mandate constituency	Volgograd Oblast	Tatyana Tsybizova	United Russia	84,314	46.2
83	Mikhaylovka single-mandate constituency	Volgograd Oblast	Andrey Babkin	Patriots of Russia	6,721	3.3
83	Mikhaylovka single-mandate constituency	Volgograd Oblast	Sergey Bondar	Greens	4,423	2.2
83	Mikhaylovka single-mandate constituency	Volgograd Oblast	Valery Kotelnikov	Yabloko	4,396	2.1
83	Mikhaylovka single-mandate constituency	Volgograd Oblast	Alexey Mayboroda	Liberal Democratic Party	21,251	10.4
83	Mikhaylovka single-mandate constituency	Volgograd Oblast	Alexey Mikheev	A Just Russia	17,693	8.6
83	Mikhaylovka single-mandate constituency	Volgograd Oblast	Vladimir Plotnikov	United Russia	119,474	58.3
83	Mikhaylovka single-mandate constituency	Volgograd Oblast	Anatoly Polunin	People's Freedom Party	2,670	1.3
83	Mikhaylovka single-mandate constituency	Volgograd Oblast	Andrey Proshakov	Rodina	5,015	2.4
83	Mikhaylovka single-mandate constituency	Volgograd Oblast	Yevgeny Shamanaev	Communist Party	23,365	11.4
84	Volzhsky single-mandate constituency	Volgograd Oblast	Dmitry Getmanenko	Patriots of Russia	4,073	2.1
84	Volzhsky single-mandate constituency	Volgograd Oblast	Irina Guseva	United Russia	96,094	50.6
84	Volzhsky single-mandate constituency	Volgograd Oblast	Yury Dubovoy	Greens	3,121	1.6
84	Volzhsky single-mandate constituency	Volgograd Oblast	Alexander Yefimov	Yabloko	5,972	3.1
84	Volzhsky single-mandate constituency	Volgograd Oblast	Alexander Kobelev	Communist Party	22,942	12.1
84	Volzhsky single-mandate constituency	Volgograd Oblast	Igor Konotopov	People's Freedom Party	2,544	1.3
84	Volzhsky single-mandate constituency	Volgograd Oblast	Dmitry Litvintsev	Liberal Democratic Party	32,426	17.1
84	Volzhsky single-mandate constituency	Volgograd Oblast	Alexey Sveshnikov	Party of Growth	3,306	1.7
84	Volzhsky single-mandate constituency	Volgograd Oblast	Yekaterina Surova	A Just Russia	13,295	7.0
84	Volzhsky single-mandate constituency	Volgograd Oblast	Nonna Tskaeva	Communists of Russia	6,036	3.2
85	Vologda single-mandate constituency	Vologda Oblast	Anton Grimov	Liberal Democratic Party	33,941	17.2
85	Vologda single-mandate constituency	Vologda Oblast	Yevgeny Domozhirov	People's Freedom Party	11,812	6.0
85	Vologda single-mandate constituency	Vologda Oblast	Olga Milyukova	Greens	7,770	3.9
85	Vologda single-mandate constituency	Vologda Oblast	Alexey Mikhailov	Party of Growth	4,960	2.5
85	Vologda single-mandate constituency	Vologda Oblast	Alexey Nekrasov	Yabloko	6,724	3.4
85	Vologda single-mandate constituency	Vologda Oblast	Kirill Panko	Communists of Russia	10,421	5.3
85	Vologda single-mandate constituency	Vologda Oblast	Mikhail Selin	Communist Party	25,970	13.2
85	Vologda single-mandate constituency	Vologda Oblast	Alexander Teltevskoy	A Just Russia	28,872	14.7
85	Vologda single-mandate constituency	Vologda Oblast	Yevgeny Shulepov	United Russia	66,358	33.7
86	Cherepovets single-mandate constituency	Vologda Oblast	Viktor Vavilov	A Just Russia	21,023	11.9
86	Cherepovets single-mandate constituency	Vologda Oblast	Snezhana Goncharova	Greens	5,091	2.9
86	Cherepovets single-mandate constituency	Vologda Oblast	Nikolay Gorin	Yabloko	4,755	2.7
86	Cherepovets single-mandate constituency	Vologda Oblast	Ilya Gromov	Liberal Democratic Party	24,867	14.1
86	Cherepovets single-mandate constituency	Vologda Oblast	Alexey Kanaev	United Russia	78,446	44.5
86	Cherepovets single-mandate constituency	Vologda Oblast	Sergey Katasonov	Party of Growth	3,909	2.2
86	Cherepovets single-mandate constituency	Vologda Oblast	Alexander Morozov	Communist Party	26,401	15.0
86	Cherepovets single-mandate constituency	Vologda Oblast	Nikolay Platonov	Rodina	3,489	2.0
86	Cherepovets single-mandate constituency	Vologda Oblast	Alexander Protasov	Communists of Russia	4,327	2.5
86	Cherepovets single-mandate constituency	Vologda Oblast	Larisa Trubitsina	People's Freedom Party	3,924	2.2
87	Voronezh single-mandate constituency	Voronezh Oblast	Sergey Gavrilov	Communist Party	38,751	17.4
87	Voronezh single-mandate constituency	Voronezh Oblast	Konstantin Kornev	Party of Growth	4,774	2.1
87	Voronezh single-mandate constituency	Voronezh Oblast	Galina Kudryavtseva	Communists of Russia	21,961	9.9
87	Voronezh single-mandate constituency	Voronezh Oblast	Arkady Ponomaryov	United Russia	118,980	53.5
87	Voronezh single-mandate constituency	Voronezh Oblast	Artyom Rymar	A Just Russia	11,938	5.4
87	Voronezh single-mandate constituency	Voronezh Oblast	Boris Skrynnikov	Patriots of Russia	4,921	2.2
87	Voronezh single-mandate constituency	Voronezh Oblast	Boris Suprenok	Yabloko	4,047	1.8
87	Voronezh single-mandate constituency	Voronezh Oblast	Maxim Filippov	Liberal Democratic Party	17,179	7.7
88	Pravoberezhny single-mandate constituency	Voronezh Oblast	Oxana Averyanova	Communists of Russia	12,149	5.6
88	Pravoberezhny single-mandate constituency	Voronezh Oblast	Svetlana Izmaylova	A Just Russia	15,350	7.0
88	Pravoberezhny single-mandate constituency	Voronezh Oblast	Sergey Kochetov	Patriots of Russia	4,094	1.9
88	Pravoberezhny single-mandate constituency	Voronezh Oblast	Alexander Ovsyannikov	Liberal Democratic Party	14,524	6.6
88	Pravoberezhny single-mandate constituency	Voronezh Oblast	Kirill Osinin	Party of Growth	3,436	1.6
88	Pravoberezhny single-mandate constituency	Voronezh Oblast	Andrey Pomerantsev	Communist Party	31,292	14.3
88	Pravoberezhny single-mandate constituency	Voronezh Oblast	Gennady Ponomaryov	Yabloko	6,002	2.7
88	Pravoberezhny single-mandate constituency	Voronezh Oblast	Sergey Chizhov	United Russia	131,759	60.3
89	Anna single-mandate constituency	Voronezh Oblast	Valentina Bobrova	Greens	9,941	4.4
89	Anna single-mandate constituency	Voronezh Oblast	Oleg Burtsev	Liberal Democratic Party	21,053	9.3
89	Anna single-mandate constituency	Voronezh Oblast	Ilya Gullov	Communists of Russia	7,998	3.5
89	Anna single-mandate constituency	Voronezh Oblast	Aleksey Zhuravlyov	Rodina	105,531	46.5
89	Anna single-mandate constituency	Voronezh Oblast	Ivan Kamenev	Patriots of Russia	3,545	1.6
89	Anna single-mandate constituency	Voronezh Oblast	Alexey Kovtun	Civilian Power	2,802	1.2
89	Anna single-mandate constituency	Voronezh Oblast	Sergey Rudakov	Communist Party	52,142	23.0
89	Anna single-mandate constituency	Voronezh Oblast	Andrey Sviridov	Party of Growth	4,551	2.0
89	Anna single-mandate constituency	Voronezh Oblast	Roman Khartsyzov	A Just Russia	15,345	6.8
89	Anna single-mandate constituency	Voronezh Oblast	Vladislav Khodakovsky	People's Freedom Party	4,128	1.8
90	Pavlovsk single-mandate constituency	Voronezh Oblast	Ruslan Gostev	Communist Party	39,142	12.6
90	Pavlovsk single-mandate constituency	Voronezh Oblast	Vitaly Klimov	A Just Russia	17,479	5.6
90	Pavlovsk single-mandate constituency	Voronezh Oblast	Marina Lyutikova	Party of Growth	5,283	1.7
90	Pavlovsk single-mandate constituency	Voronezh Oblast	Andrey Markov	United Russia	198,149	63.7
90	Pavlovsk single-mandate constituency	Voronezh Oblast	Sergey Mushtenko	Yabloko	2,484	0.8
90	Pavlovsk single-mandate constituency	Voronezh Oblast	Mikhail Ochkin	Greens	2,187	0.7
90	Pavlovsk single-mandate constituency	Voronezh Oblast	Sergey Poymanov	Patriots of Russia	16,153	5.2
90	Pavlovsk single-mandate constituency	Voronezh Oblast	Marina Spitsyna	Liberal Democratic Party	19,148	6.2
90	Pavlovsk single-mandate constituency	Voronezh Oblast	Yury Shcherbakov	Communists of Russia	11,162	3.6
91	Ivanovo single-mandate constituency	Ivanovo Oblast	Roman Astafyev	Civic Platform	2,451	1.5
91	Ivanovo single-mandate constituency	Ivanovo Oblast	Danila Bedyaev	Yabloko	4,776	3.0
91	Ivanovo single-mandate constituency	Ivanovo Oblast	Olga Daricheva	Greens	6,383	4.0
91	Ivanovo single-mandate constituency	Ivanovo Oblast	Vyacheslav Kalinin	Rodina	3,618	2.2
91	Ivanovo single-mandate constituency	Ivanovo Oblast	Vladimir Kurin	Patriots of Russia	2,617	1.6
91	Ivanovo single-mandate constituency	Ivanovo Oblast	Alexander Orekhov	Communists of Russia	7,180	4.5
91	Ivanovo single-mandate constituency	Ivanovo Oblast	Pavel Popov	A Just Russia	12,899	8.0
91	Ivanovo single-mandate constituency	Ivanovo Oblast	Dmitry Salomatin	Communist Party	28,974	18.0
91	Ivanovo single-mandate constituency	Ivanovo Oblast	Alexey Khokhlov	United Russia	68,291	42.4
91	Ivanovo single-mandate constituency	Ivanovo Oblast	Dmitry Shelyakin	Liberal Democratic Party	23,874	14.8
92	Kineshma single-mandate constituency	Ivanovo Oblast	Andrey Valkov	Patriots of Russia	5,878	3.9
92	Kineshma single-mandate constituency	Ivanovo Oblast	Maxim Veryasov	Liberal Democratic Party	21,963	14.8
92	Kineshma single-mandate constituency	Ivanovo Oblast	Yury Ganenko	Civic Platform	1,546	1.0
92	Kineshma single-mandate constituency	Ivanovo Oblast	Vladimir Klenov	Communist Party	38,299	25.7
92	Kineshma single-mandate constituency	Ivanovo Oblast	Viktor Kuzmenko	Communists of Russia	6,427	4.3
92	Kineshma single-mandate constituency	Ivanovo Oblast	Ivan Melnikov	Yabloko	5,817	3.9
92	Kineshma single-mandate constituency	Ivanovo Oblast	Dmitry Sivokhin	A Just Russia	12,277	8.2
92	Kineshma single-mandate constituency	Ivanovo Oblast	Yury Smirnov	United Russia	56,666	38.1
93	Irkutsk single-mandate constituency	Irkutsk Oblast	Sergey Bespalov	People's Freedom Party	3,878	2.3
93	Irkutsk single-mandate constituency	Irkutsk Oblast	Viktor Galitskov	Liberal Democratic Party	13,800	8.2
93	Irkutsk single-mandate constituency	Irkutsk Oblast	Maxim Yevdokimov	Rodina	3,972	2.4
93	Irkutsk single-mandate constituency	Irkutsk Oblast	Larisa Yegorova	A Just Russia	16,616	9.9
93	Irkutsk single-mandate constituency	Irkutsk Oblast	Viktor Yemelyanov	Greens	3,061	1.8
93	Irkutsk single-mandate constituency	Irkutsk Oblast	Alexander Ilyin	Party of Growth	2,441	1.5
93	Irkutsk single-mandate constituency	Irkutsk Oblast	Larisa Kazakova	Yabloko	3,816	2.3
93	Irkutsk single-mandate constituency	Irkutsk Oblast	Oleg Kankov	United Russia	53,473	31.9
93	Irkutsk single-mandate constituency	Irkutsk Oblast	Yuri Kankov	Civic Platform	4,235	2.5
93	Irkutsk single-mandate constituency	Irkutsk Oblast	Mikhail Shchapov	Communist Party	60,604	36.2
93	Irkutsk single-mandate constituency	Irkutsk Oblast	Sergey Yakubov	Patriots of Russia	1,712	1.0
94	Angarsk single-mandate constituency	Irkutsk Oblast	Sergey Brenyuk	Communist Party	25,918	17.3
94	Angarsk single-mandate constituency	Irkutsk Oblast	Olga Zhakova	People's Freedom Party	3,752	2.5
94	Angarsk single-mandate constituency	Irkutsk Oblast	Dmitry Zenov	Communists of Russia	3,007	2.0
94	Angarsk single-mandate constituency	Irkutsk Oblast	Olesya Kovalyova	Civilian Power	2,171	1.4
94	Angarsk single-mandate constituency	Irkutsk Oblast	Mariya Kotova	Patriots of Russia	9,793	6.5
94	Angarsk single-mandate constituency	Irkutsk Oblast	Alexey Krasnoshtanov	United Russia	80,306	53.6
94	Angarsk single-mandate constituency	Irkutsk Oblast	Oleg Kuznetsov	Liberal Democratic Party	12,717	8.5
94	Angarsk single-mandate constituency	Irkutsk Oblast	Sergey Perevoznikov	Greens	3,629	2.4
94	Angarsk single-mandate constituency	Irkutsk Oblast	Alexey Ponomaryov	A Just Russia	6,386	4.3
94	Angarsk single-mandate constituency	Irkutsk Oblast	Mikhail Toropov	Rodina	1,419	0.9
94	Angarsk single-mandate constituency	Irkutsk Oblast	Tatyana Kharun	Civic Platform	799	0.5
95	Shelekhov single-mandate constituency	Irkutsk Oblast	Vladimir Alekseyev	Yabloko	4,766	2.9
95	Shelekhov single-mandate constituency	Irkutsk Oblast	Mikhail Vasilyev	People's Freedom Party	3,543	2.1
95	Shelekhov single-mandate constituency	Irkutsk Oblast	Ivan Grachyov	Party of Growth	20,033	12.1
95	Shelekhov single-mandate constituency	Irkutsk Oblast	Yury Yelokhin	Greens	1,888	1.1
95	Shelekhov single-mandate constituency	Irkutsk Oblast	Dmitry Yershov	Liberal Democratic Party	12,089	7.3
95	Shelekhov single-mandate constituency	Irkutsk Oblast	Nikolay Ignatyev	Civic Platform	1,651	1.0
95	Shelekhov single-mandate constituency	Irkutsk Oblast	Leonid Karnaukhov	Communists of Russia	6,602	4.0
95	Shelekhov single-mandate constituency	Irkutsk Oblast	Georgy Komarov	A Just Russia	5,074	3.1
95	Shelekhov single-mandate constituency	Irkutsk Oblast	Nikolay Kostyukov	Civilian Power	610	0.4
95	Shelekhov single-mandate constituency	Irkutsk Oblast	Vasily Pronichev	Patriots of Russia	1,442	0.9
95	Shelekhov single-mandate constituency	Irkutsk Oblast	Anton Romanov	Communist Party	31,494	19.1
95	Shelekhov single-mandate constituency	Irkutsk Oblast	Sergey Ten	United Russia	72,660	44.0
95	Shelekhov single-mandate constituency	Irkutsk Oblast	Nikolay Chumak	Rodina	3,284	2.0
96	Bratsk single-mandate constituency	Irkutsk Oblast	Andrey Andreyev	Communist Party	35,268	25.4
96	Bratsk single-mandate constituency	Irkutsk Oblast	Dmitry Belikov	Civic Platform	3,279	2.4
96	Bratsk single-mandate constituency	Irkutsk Oblast	Oleg Katasonov	Communists of Russia	4,294	3.1
96	Bratsk single-mandate constituency	Irkutsk Oblast	Denis Kuchmenko	Party of Growth	3,891	2.8
96	Bratsk single-mandate constituency	Irkutsk Oblast	Georgy Lyubenkov	Liberal Democratic Party	21,949	15.8
96	Bratsk single-mandate constituency	Irkutsk Oblast	Viktor Makarov	Patriots of Russia	3,774	2.7
96	Bratsk single-mandate constituency	Irkutsk Oblast	Nikolay Ochkas	Rodina	5,230	3.8
96	Bratsk single-mandate constituency	Irkutsk Oblast	Andrey Chernyshyov	United Russia	61,409	44.1
97	Kaliningrad single-mandate constituency	Kaliningrad Oblast	Egor Anisimov	Liberal Democratic Party	22,553	13.9
97	Kaliningrad single-mandate constituency	Kaliningrad Oblast	Vitaly Goncharov	Greens	3,963	2.4
97	Kaliningrad single-mandate constituency	Kaliningrad Oblast	Natalya Masyanova	A Just Russia	14,173	8.7
97	Kaliningrad single-mandate constituency	Kaliningrad Oblast	Dmitry Novik	Rodina	4,801	3.0
97	Kaliningrad single-mandate constituency	Kaliningrad Oblast	Alexander Orlov	Communists of Russia	8,302	5.1
97	Kaliningrad single-mandate constituency	Kaliningrad Oblast	Dmitry Potapenko	Party of Growth	7,147	4.4
97	Kaliningrad single-mandate constituency	Kaliningrad Oblast	Alexander Pyatikop	United Russia	66,994	41.2
97	Kaliningrad single-mandate constituency	Kaliningrad Oblast	Igor Revin	Communist Party	23,672	14.6
97	Kaliningrad single-mandate constituency	Kaliningrad Oblast	Mikhail Chesalin	Patriots of Russia	10,913	6.7
98	Central single-mandate constituency	Kaliningrad Oblast	Yury Galanin	Rodina	6,483	3.8
98	Central single-mandate constituency	Kaliningrad Oblast	Solomon Ginzburg	Party of Growth	18,101	10.7
98	Central single-mandate constituency	Kaliningrad Oblast	Sergey Malikov	Civic Platform	2,740	1.6
98	Central single-mandate constituency	Kaliningrad Oblast	Yevgeny Mishin	Liberal Democratic Party	19,883	11.8
98	Central single-mandate constituency	Kaliningrad Oblast	Maxim Pavlenko	Communists of Russia	7,957	4.7
98	Central single-mandate constituency	Kaliningrad Oblast	Igor Pleshkov	Communist Party	18,965	11.2
98	Central single-mandate constituency	Kaliningrad Oblast	Lyudmila Povlavskaya	Greens	7,614	4.5
98	Central single-mandate constituency	Kaliningrad Oblast	Alexey Silanov	United Russia	73,322	43.5
98	Central single-mandate constituency	Kaliningrad Oblast	Pavel Fyodorov	A Just Russia	13,538	8.0
99	Kaluga single-mandate constituency	Kaluga Oblast	Alexander Avdeyev	United Russia	75,154	48.4
99	Kaluga single-mandate constituency	Kaluga Oblast	Andrey Bekker	Patriots of Russia	2,746	1.8
99	Kaluga single-mandate constituency	Kaluga Oblast	Nadezhda Yefremova	A Just Russia	12,966	8.4
99	Kaluga single-mandate constituency	Kaluga Oblast	Alexey Kolesnikov	Yabloko	7,284	4.7
99	Kaluga single-mandate constituency	Kaluga Oblast	Anton Tarasenko	Communists of Russia	6,096	3.9
99	Kaluga single-mandate constituency	Kaluga Oblast	Marina Trishina	Liberal Democratic Party	18,122	11.7
99	Kaluga single-mandate constituency	Kaluga Oblast	Alexander Chernov	Rodina	5,317	3.4
99	Kaluga single-mandate constituency	Kaluga Oblast	Nikolay Yashkin	Communist Party	27,577	17.8
100	Obninsk single-mandate constituency	Kaluga Oblast	Anton Vasilyev	Patriots of Russia	7,419	4.3
100	Obninsk single-mandate constituency	Kaluga Oblast	Vadim Dengin	Liberal Democratic Party	23,291	13.6
100	Obninsk single-mandate constituency	Kaluga Oblast	Sergey Dondo	Communists of Russia	6,325	3.7
100	Obninsk single-mandate constituency	Kaluga Oblast	Marina Kostina	Communist Party	34,007	19.8
100	Obninsk single-mandate constituency	Kaluga Oblast	Oleg Ovsyannikov	Yabloko	6,611	3.9
100	Obninsk single-mandate constituency	Kaluga Oblast	Gennady Sklyar	United Russia	80,615	47.0
100	Obninsk single-mandate constituency	Kaluga Oblast	Alexander Trushkov	A Just Russia	13,313	7.8
101	Kemerovo single-mandate constituency	Kemerovo Oblast	Tatyana Alexeyeva	United Russia	307,128	71.7
101	Kemerovo single-mandate constituency	Kemerovo Oblast	Georgy Antonov	Communist Party	5,559	1.3
101	Kemerovo single-mandate constituency	Kemerovo Oblast	Roman Kleyster	Liberal Democratic Party	25,776	6.0
101	Kemerovo single-mandate constituency	Kemerovo Oblast	Pyotr Potapov	Communists of Russia	4,389	1.0
101	Kemerovo single-mandate constituency	Kemerovo Oblast	Lyudmila Ryabinyuk	A Just Russia	85,648	20.0
102	Prokopyevsk single-mandate constituency	Kemerovo Oblast	Olga Bondareva	Communists of Russia	9,527	2.1
102	Prokopyevsk single-mandate constituency	Kemerovo Oblast	Vitaly Ilyin	Yabloko	7,051	1.6
102	Prokopyevsk single-mandate constituency	Kemerovo Oblast	Dmitry Islamov	United Russia	350,790	77.9
102	Prokopyevsk single-mandate constituency	Kemerovo Oblast	Vladimir Karpov	Communist Party	27,416	6.1
102	Prokopyevsk single-mandate constituency	Kemerovo Oblast	Maxim Parshukov	Liberal Democratic Party	32,786	7.3
102	Prokopyevsk single-mandate constituency	Kemerovo Oblast	Nikolay Ryzhak	A Just Russia	22,506	5.0
103	Zavodsky single-mandate constituency	Kemerovo Oblast	Gleb Alshevich	Yabloko	7,133	1.6
103	Zavodsky single-mandate constituency	Kemerovo Oblast	Yury Vitkovsky	Communist Party	28,625	6.5
103	Zavodsky single-mandate constituency	Kemerovo Oblast	Yevgeny Mishenin	A Just Russia	15,820	3.6
103	Zavodsky single-mandate constituency	Kemerovo Oblast	Igor Ukraintsev	Liberal Democratic Party	36,378	8.3
103	Zavodsky single-mandate constituency	Kemerovo Oblast	Irina Usoltseva	Communists of Russia	9,652	2.2
103	Zavodsky single-mandate constituency	Kemerovo Oblast	Pavel Fedyayev	United Russia	342,161	77.8
104	Novokuznetsk single-mandate constituency	Kemerovo Oblast	Rostislav Bardokin	Patriots of Russia	35,723	8.3
104	Novokuznetsk single-mandate constituency	Kemerovo Oblast	Leonid Burakov	Communist Party	13,677	3.2
104	Novokuznetsk single-mandate constituency	Kemerovo Oblast	Afanasiy Yeryomkin	Communists of Russia	3,742	0.9
104	Novokuznetsk single-mandate constituency	Kemerovo Oblast	Yevgeny Yermakov	Party of Growth	3,426	0.8
104	Novokuznetsk single-mandate constituency	Kemerovo Oblast	Alexander Zaytsev	A Just Russia	11,534	2.7
104	Novokuznetsk single-mandate constituency	Kemerovo Oblast	Stanislav Karpov	Liberal Democratic Party	40,876	9.5
104	Novokuznetsk single-mandate constituency	Kemerovo Oblast	Alexander Maximov	United Russia	321,538	74.7
105	Kirov single-mandate constituency	Kirov Oblast	Rakhim Azimov	United Russia	109,333	54.4
105	Kirov single-mandate constituency	Kirov Oblast	Nikolay Barsukov	Communists of Russia	14,404	7.2
105	Kirov single-mandate constituency	Kirov Oblast	Alexey Votintsev	Communist Party	27,346	13.6
105	Kirov single-mandate constituency	Kirov Oblast	Alexander Maltsev	A Just Russia	28,764	14.3
105	Kirov single-mandate constituency	Kirov Oblast	Andrey Orlov	Party of Growth	7,912	3.9
105	Kirov single-mandate constituency	Kirov Oblast	Andrey Perov	Yabloko	5,710	2.8
105	Kirov single-mandate constituency	Kirov Oblast	Sergey Rogozhkin	Patriots of Russia	7,462	3.7
106	Kirovo-Chepetsk single-mandate constituency	Kirov Oblast	Artur Abashev	Yabloko	4,574	2.0
106	Kirovo-Chepetsk single-mandate constituency	Kirov Oblast	Oleg Valenchuk	United Russia	95,499	42.3
106	Kirovo-Chepetsk single-mandate constituency	Kirov Oblast	Sergey Doronin	A Just Russia	45,069	20.0
106	Kirovo-Chepetsk single-mandate constituency	Kirov Oblast	Oleg Kassin	Party of Growth	4,880	2.2
106	Kirovo-Chepetsk single-mandate constituency	Kirov Oblast	Vladimir Kostin	Liberal Democratic Party	28,670	12.7
106	Kirovo-Chepetsk single-mandate constituency	Kirov Oblast	Fyodor Luginin	Rodina	3,116	1.4
106	Kirovo-Chepetsk single-mandate constituency	Kirov Oblast	Sergey Mamaev	Communist Party	30,529	13.5
106	Kirovo-Chepetsk single-mandate constituency	Kirov Oblast	Vladimir Porchesku	Communists of Russia	4,666	2.1
106	Kirovo-Chepetsk single-mandate constituency	Kirov Oblast	Olga Shakleina	Greens	8,459	3.8
107	Kostroma single-mandate constituency	Kostroma Oblast	Alexander Bakanov	Greens	2,822	1.4
107	Kostroma single-mandate constituency	Kostroma Oblast	Valery Izhitsky	Communist Party	51,746	25.1
107	Kostroma single-mandate constituency	Kostroma Oblast	Vladimir Mikhaylov	Yabloko	12,139	5.9
107	Kostroma single-mandate constituency	Kostroma Oblast	Alexander Plyusnin	A Just Russia	16,483	8.0
107	Kostroma single-mandate constituency	Kostroma Oblast	Alexey Postnikov	Party of Growth	3,466	1.7
107	Kostroma single-mandate constituency	Kostroma Oblast	Vladimir Sabelnikov	Communists of Russia	3,868	1.9
107	Kostroma single-mandate constituency	Kostroma Oblast	Alexey Sitnikov	United Russia	80,762	39.2
107	Kostroma single-mandate constituency	Kostroma Oblast	Yevgeny Trepov	Rodina	13,702	6.7
107	Kostroma single-mandate constituency	Kostroma Oblast	Ruslan Fyodorov	Liberal Democratic Party	20,877	10.1
108	Kurgan single-mandate constituency	Kurgan Oblast	Alexander Iltyakov	United Russia	174,909	59.9
108	Kurgan single-mandate constituency	Kurgan Oblast	Andrey Ilchik	A Just Russia	21,707	7.4
108	Kurgan single-mandate constituency	Kurgan Oblast	Vasily Kislitsyn	Communist Party	44,893	15.4
108	Kurgan single-mandate constituency	Kurgan Oblast	Alexander Samoylov	Patriots of Russia	6,302	2.2
108	Kurgan single-mandate constituency	Kurgan Oblast	Viktor Sevostyanov	Greens	4,004	1.4
108	Kurgan single-mandate constituency	Kurgan Oblast	Anar Tugushev	Communists of Russia	5,022	1.7
108	Kurgan single-mandate constituency	Kurgan Oblast	Dmitry Feldsherov	Yabloko	4,010	1.4
108	Kurgan single-mandate constituency	Kurgan Oblast	Andrey Yusupov	Rodina	3,907	1.3
108	Kurgan single-mandate constituency	Kurgan Oblast	Yury Yarushin	Liberal Democratic Party	27,188	9.3
109	Kursk single-mandate constituency	Kursk Oblast	Artyom Vakarev	Communists of Russia	8,898	4.3
109	Kursk single-mandate constituency	Kursk Oblast	Alexey Volkov	Rodina	8,796	4.2
109	Kursk single-mandate constituency	Kursk Oblast	Tatyana Voronina	United Russia	91,515	43.8
109	Kursk single-mandate constituency	Kursk Oblast	Nikolay Ivanov	Communist Party	25,301	12.1
109	Kursk single-mandate constituency	Kursk Oblast	Olga Li	Yabloko	22,099	10.6
109	Kursk single-mandate constituency	Kursk Oblast	Svetlana Sidorova	Patriots of Russia	6,561	3.1
109	Kursk single-mandate constituency	Kursk Oblast	Vladimir Fyodorov	Liberal Democratic Party	24,836	11.9
109	Kursk single-mandate constituency	Kursk Oblast	Alyona Kharlamova	Civilian Power	1,459	0.7
109	Kursk single-mandate constituency	Kursk Oblast	Denis Khmelevskoy	Party of Growth	2,194	1.0
109	Kursk single-mandate constituency	Kursk Oblast	Alexander Chetverikov	A Just Russia	17,347	8.3
110	Seimsky single-mandate constituency	Kursk Oblast	Valery Akinshin	Rodina	2,924	1.4
110	Seimsky single-mandate constituency	Kursk Oblast	Maxim Budanov	Communist Party	16,198	7.6
110	Seimsky single-mandate constituency	Kursk Oblast	Yury Budkov	Independent	4,458	2.1
110	Seimsky single-mandate constituency	Kursk Oblast	Yekaterina Vdovina	Civilian Power	2,502	1.2
110	Seimsky single-mandate constituency	Kursk Oblast	Viktor Karamyshev	United Russia	114,855	53.9
110	Seimsky single-mandate constituency	Kursk Oblast	Anatoly Kurakin	A Just Russia	7,986	3.7
110	Seimsky single-mandate constituency	Kursk Oblast	Anna Raspopova	Liberal Democratic Party	14,516	6.8
110	Seimsky single-mandate constituency	Kursk Oblast	Alexander Rutskoy	Patriots of Russia	38,698	18.2
110	Seimsky single-mandate constituency	Kursk Oblast	Anton Udovenko	Communists of Russia	4,487	2.1
110	Seimsky single-mandate constituency	Kursk Oblast	Alexander Fedulov	Party of Growth	1,933	0.9
110	Seimsky single-mandate constituency	Kursk Oblast	Tatyana Chernikova	Greens	2,907	1.4
110	Seimsky single-mandate constituency	Kursk Oblast	Alexey Shestavin	Yabloko	1,559	0.7
111	Vsevolozhsk single-mandate constituency	Leningrad Oblast	Vladimir Drachyov	United Russia	100,133	50.1
111	Vsevolozhsk single-mandate constituency	Leningrad Oblast	Anastasiya Zatochnaya	Rodina	5,791	2.9
111	Vsevolozhsk single-mandate constituency	Leningrad Oblast	Valeriya Kovalenko	A Just Russia	22,260	11.1
111	Vsevolozhsk single-mandate constituency	Leningrad Oblast	Larisa Larkina	Greens	5,971	3.0
111	Vsevolozhsk single-mandate constituency	Leningrad Oblast	Andrey Lebedev	Liberal Democratic Party	23,415	11.7
111	Vsevolozhsk single-mandate constituency	Leningrad Oblast	Tatyana Lepetenina	Civic Platform	3,100	1.5
111	Vsevolozhsk single-mandate constituency	Leningrad Oblast	Vladimir Popov	Party of Growth	7,322	3.7
111	Vsevolozhsk single-mandate constituency	Leningrad Oblast	Lyudmila Savina	Communists of Russia	10,074	5.0
111	Vsevolozhsk single-mandate constituency	Leningrad Oblast	Vladimir Taymazov	Communist Party	13,415	6.7
111	Vsevolozhsk single-mandate constituency	Leningrad Oblast	Alexey Etmanov	Yabloko	8,569	4.3
112	Kingisepp single-mandate constituency	Leningrad Oblast	Armen Ananyan	Greens	2,529	1.4
112	Kingisepp single-mandate constituency	Leningrad Oblast	Alexander Gabitov	Civic Platform	1,541	0.9
112	Kingisepp single-mandate constituency	Leningrad Oblast	Anatoly Golosov	Rodina	3,755	2.1
112	Kingisepp single-mandate constituency	Leningrad Oblast	Vyacheslav Dyubkov	Liberal Democratic Party	14,413	8.0
112	Kingisepp single-mandate constituency	Leningrad Oblast	Nikolay Kuzmin	Communist Party	21,424	11.8
112	Kingisepp single-mandate constituency	Leningrad Oblast	Marina Lyubushkina	A Just Russia	22,823	12.6
112	Kingisepp single-mandate constituency	Leningrad Oblast	Sergey Naryshkin	United Russia	98,999	54.7
112	Kingisepp single-mandate constituency	Leningrad Oblast	Viktor Perov	Communists of Russia	6,894	3.8
112	Kingisepp single-mandate constituency	Leningrad Oblast	Alexander Senotrusov	Yabloko	5,329	2.9
112	Kingisepp single-mandate constituency	Leningrad Oblast	Dmitry Skurikhin	People's Freedom Party	3,194	1.8
113	Volkhov single-mandate constituency	Leningrad Oblast	Maxim Volkov	Party of Growth	6,234	3.7
113	Volkhov single-mandate constituency	Leningrad Oblast	Andrey Gindos	Communists of Russia	6,702	3.9
113	Volkhov single-mandate constituency	Leningrad Oblast	Galina Kulikova	A Just Russia	26,078	15.3
113	Volkhov single-mandate constituency	Leningrad Oblast	Vladimir Mayorov	Civic Platform	4,370	2.6
113	Volkhov single-mandate constituency	Leningrad Oblast	Yelena Morozenok	Greens	2,992	1.8
113	Volkhov single-mandate constituency	Leningrad Oblast	Vladimir Ozherelyev	Communist Party	15,778	9.3
113	Volkhov single-mandate constituency	Leningrad Oblast	Sergey Petrov	United Russia	84,066	49.5
113	Volkhov single-mandate constituency	Leningrad Oblast	Alexey Ponimatkin	Liberal Democratic Party	13,598	8.0
113	Volkhov single-mandate constituency	Leningrad Oblast	Alexander Rastorguev	People's Freedom Party	3,431	2.0
113	Volkhov single-mandate constituency	Leningrad Oblast	Stevlana Stosha	Yabloko	3,366	2.0
113	Volkhov single-mandate constituency	Leningrad Oblast	Valery Shinkarenko	Rodina	3,292	1.9
114	Lipetsk single-mandate constituency	Lipetsk Oblast	Nikolay Bortsov	United Russia	130,520	56.8
114	Lipetsk single-mandate constituency	Lipetsk Oblast	Sergey Valetov	Rodina	13,415	5.8
114	Lipetsk single-mandate constituency	Lipetsk Oblast	Yelena Yerkina	Party of Growth	4,565	2.0
114	Lipetsk single-mandate constituency	Lipetsk Oblast	Vadim Kovrigin	Yabloko	5,026	2.2
114	Lipetsk single-mandate constituency	Lipetsk Oblast	Nikolay Razvorotnev	Communist Party	31,079	13.5
114	Lipetsk single-mandate constituency	Lipetsk Oblast	Vadim Trofimov	Communists of Russia	7,496	3.3
114	Lipetsk single-mandate constituency	Lipetsk Oblast	Svetlana Tyunina	A Just Russia	16,684	7.3
114	Lipetsk single-mandate constituency	Lipetsk Oblast	Vladimir Fomichev	People's Freedom Party	1,985	0.9
114	Lipetsk single-mandate constituency	Lipetsk Oblast	Maxim Khalimonchuk	Liberal Democratic Party	18,895	8.2
115	Levoberezhny single-mandate constituency	Lipetsk Oblast	Larisa Ksenofontova	A Just Russia	26,330	10.5
115	Levoberezhny single-mandate constituency	Lipetsk Oblast	Yevgeny Rozhnov	Yabloko	6,347	2.5
115	Levoberezhny single-mandate constituency	Lipetsk Oblast	Mikhail Tarasenko	United Russia	154,786	61.8
115	Levoberezhny single-mandate constituency	Lipetsk Oblast	Sergey Tokarev	Communist Party	34,283	13.7
115	Levoberezhny single-mandate constituency	Lipetsk Oblast	Alexander Trofimov	Communists of Russia	7,665	3.1
115	Levoberezhny single-mandate constituency	Lipetsk Oblast	Oleg Khomutinnikov	Liberal Democratic Party	21,062	8.4
116	Magadan single-mandate constituency	Magadan Oblast	Oxana Bondar	United Russia	19,668	48.8
116	Magadan single-mandate constituency	Magadan Oblast	Yury Davydenko	Communists of Russia	2,571	6.4
116	Magadan single-mandate constituency	Magadan Oblast	Pavel Zhukov	Yabloko	1,306	3.2
116	Magadan single-mandate constituency	Magadan Oblast	Sergey Ivanitsky	Communist Party	6,252	15.5
116	Magadan single-mandate constituency	Magadan Oblast	Roman Isaev	Liberal Democratic Party	5,863	14.5
116	Magadan single-mandate constituency	Magadan Oblast	Igor Novikov	A Just Russia	4,654	11.5
117	Balashikha single-mandate constituency	Moscow Oblast	Anatoly Batashev	Greens	8,059	3.7
117	Balashikha single-mandate constituency	Moscow Oblast	Natalya Blinova	Communists of Russia	11,363	5.2
117	Balashikha single-mandate constituency	Moscow Oblast	Oxana Krasikova	Communist Party	21,364	9.9
117	Balashikha single-mandate constituency	Moscow Oblast	Alexey Mushin	Liberal Democratic Party	20,186	9.3
117	Balashikha single-mandate constituency	Moscow Oblast	Dmitry Pavlenok	People's Freedom Party	8,193	3.8
117	Balashikha single-mandate constituency	Moscow Oblast	Vyacheslav Pivulsky	Party of Growth	7,523	3.5
117	Balashikha single-mandate constituency	Moscow Oblast	Margarita Svergunova	Rodina	6,959	3.2
117	Balashikha single-mandate constituency	Moscow Oblast	Maxim Soshin	A Just Russia	14,735	6.8
117	Balashikha single-mandate constituency	Moscow Oblast	Maksim Surayev	United Russia	118,132	54.6
118	Dmitrov single-mandate constituency	Moscow Oblast	Mikhail Avdeyev	Communist Party	22,980	12.1
118	Dmitrov single-mandate constituency	Moscow Oblast	Vyacheslav Belousov	A Just Russia	13,585	7.2
118	Dmitrov single-mandate constituency	Moscow Oblast	Stanislav Bychinsky	Patriots of Russia	3,942	2.1
118	Dmitrov single-mandate constituency	Moscow Oblast	Yury Vzyatyshev	Greens	2,915	1.5
118	Dmitrov single-mandate constituency	Moscow Oblast	Viktoriya Dmitrieva	Liberal Democratic Party	17,280	9.1
118	Dmitrov single-mandate constituency	Moscow Oblast	Mikhail Zernov	Independent	12,673	6.7
118	Dmitrov single-mandate constituency	Moscow Oblast	Boris Nadezhdin	Party of Growth	10,744	5.7
118	Dmitrov single-mandate constituency	Moscow Oblast	Irina Rodnina	United Russia	89,139	47.1
118	Dmitrov single-mandate constituency	Moscow Oblast	Vladimir Ryazanov	Communists of Russia	6,972	3.7
118	Dmitrov single-mandate constituency	Moscow Oblast	Dmitry Trunin	Yabloko	8,901	4.7
119	Kolomna single-mandate constituency	Moscow Oblast	Semyon Bagdasarov	A Just Russia	16,858	10.1
119	Kolomna single-mandate constituency	Moscow Oblast	Dmitry Baranovsky	Greens	6,630	4.0
119	Kolomna single-mandate constituency	Moscow Oblast	Yury Bezler	Liberal Democratic Party	19,735	11.8
119	Kolomna single-mandate constituency	Moscow Oblast	Sergey Karlov	Party of Growth	5,135	3.1
119	Kolomna single-mandate constituency	Moscow Oblast	Oleg Osipov	Rodina	4,034	2.4
119	Kolomna single-mandate constituency	Moscow Oblast	Yelena Serova	United Russia	84,682	50.8
119	Kolomna single-mandate constituency	Moscow Oblast	Vitaly Fyodorov	Communist Party	21,600	13.0
119	Kolomna single-mandate constituency	Moscow Oblast	Igor Chernyshov	Communists of Russia	7,885	4.7
120	Krasnogorsk single-mandate constituency	Moscow Oblast	Yelena Grishina	Greens	9,141	4.8
120	Krasnogorsk single-mandate constituency	Moscow Oblast	Igor Zaytsev	Yabloko	12,182	6.4
120	Krasnogorsk single-mandate constituency	Moscow Oblast	Yevgeny Ivanov	Rodina	7,946	4.2
120	Krasnogorsk single-mandate constituency	Moscow Oblast	Konstantin Klimenko	Party of Growth	6,545	3.4
120	Krasnogorsk single-mandate constituency	Moscow Oblast	Nikolay Mechtanov	Communists of Russia	8,598	4.5
120	Krasnogorsk single-mandate constituency	Moscow Oblast	Alexander Romanovich	A Just Russia	9,490	5.0
120	Krasnogorsk single-mandate constituency	Moscow Oblast	Alexey Russkikh	Communist Party	30,344	15.9
120	Krasnogorsk single-mandate constituency	Moscow Oblast	Vasily Kharpak	Liberal Democratic Party	23,959	12.5
120	Krasnogorsk single-mandate constituency	Moscow Oblast	Vadim Kholostov	Patriots of Russia	5,417	2.8
120	Krasnogorsk single-mandate constituency	Moscow Oblast	Martin Shakkum	United Russia	77,423	40.5
121	Lyubertsy single-mandate constituency	Moscow Oblast	Lidiya Antonova	United Russia	103,949	51.2
121	Lyubertsy single-mandate constituency	Moscow Oblast	Viktor Balabanov	Yabloko	9,093	4.5
121	Lyubertsy single-mandate constituency	Moscow Oblast	Viktor Banov	Communists of Russia	6,222	3.1
121	Lyubertsy single-mandate constituency	Moscow Oblast	Pavel Grudinin	Communist Party	27,711	13.6
121	Lyubertsy single-mandate constituency	Moscow Oblast	Vladimir Laktyushin	Rodina	5,766	2.8
121	Lyubertsy single-mandate constituency	Moscow Oblast	Vitaly Ozherelyev	Greens	3,196	1.6
121	Lyubertsy single-mandate constituency	Moscow Oblast	Oleg Solsky	Party of Growth	3,686	1.8
121	Lyubertsy single-mandate constituency	Moscow Oblast	Lyudmila Tropina	Patriots of Russia	5,336	2.6
121	Lyubertsy single-mandate constituency	Moscow Oblast	Andrey Khromov	Liberal Democratic Party	18,304	9.0
121	Lyubertsy single-mandate constituency	Moscow Oblast	Igor Chistyukhin	A Just Russia	19,886	9.8
122	Odintsovo single-mandate constituency	Moscow Oblast	Viktor Alksnis	A Just Russia	19,882	9.8
122	Odintsovo single-mandate constituency	Moscow Oblast	Sergey Artyomov	Communists of Russia	11,979	5.9
122	Odintsovo single-mandate constituency	Moscow Oblast	Sergey Astashov	Greens	10,066	5.0
122	Odintsovo single-mandate constituency	Moscow Oblast	Alexey Korolyov	Rodina	8,177	4.0
122	Odintsovo single-mandate constituency	Moscow Oblast	Oxana Pushkina	United Russia	95,812	47.4
122	Odintsovo single-mandate constituency	Moscow Oblast	Vyacheslav Savinov	Patriots of Russia	5,130	2.5
122	Odintsovo single-mandate constituency	Moscow Oblast	Yaroslav Svyatoslavsky	People's Freedom Party	7,309	3.6
122	Odintsovo single-mandate constituency	Moscow Oblast	Yury Spirin	Liberal Democratic Party	20,974	10.4
122	Odintsovo single-mandate constituency	Moscow Oblast	Fyodor Tsekhmistrenko	Civic Platform	1,234	0.6
122	Odintsovo single-mandate constituency	Moscow Oblast	Vladimir Chuvilin	Communist Party	21,389	10.6
123	Orekhovo-Zuyevo single-mandate constituency	Moscow Oblast	Nina Veselova	Communist Party	23,238	15.1
123	Orekhovo-Zuyevo single-mandate constituency	Moscow Oblast	Ivan Zadumkin	Communists of Russia	6,647	4.3
123	Orekhovo-Zuyevo single-mandate constituency	Moscow Oblast	Artyom Zuyev	Yabloko	6,159	4.0
123	Orekhovo-Zuyevo single-mandate constituency	Moscow Oblast	Valentina Kabanova	United Russia	65,246	42.5
123	Orekhovo-Zuyevo single-mandate constituency	Moscow Oblast	Artyom Kovalyov	Greens	6,223	4.1
123	Orekhovo-Zuyevo single-mandate constituency	Moscow Oblast	Alexander Novopashin	Rodina	5,023	3.3
123	Orekhovo-Zuyevo single-mandate constituency	Moscow Oblast	Yury Savelov	Party of Growth	4,914	3.2
123	Orekhovo-Zuyevo single-mandate constituency	Moscow Oblast	Andrey Svintsov	Liberal Democratic Party	17,507	11.4
123	Orekhovo-Zuyevo single-mandate constituency	Moscow Oblast	Sergei Sobko	A Just Russia	18,568	12.1
124	Podolsk single-mandate constituency	Moscow Oblast	Alexander Gunko	Yabloko	10,217	5.8
124	Podolsk single-mandate constituency	Moscow Oblast	Boris Dvoynikov	Communists of Russia	7,411	4.2
124	Podolsk single-mandate constituency	Moscow Oblast	Sergey Korolyov	Rodina	10,972	6.2
124	Podolsk single-mandate constituency	Moscow Oblast	Sergey Kudinov	A Just Russia	12,616	7.1
124	Podolsk single-mandate constituency	Moscow Oblast	Andrey Podmoskovsny	Patriots of Russia	2,421	1.4
124	Podolsk single-mandate constituency	Moscow Oblast	Fuad Sultanov	Liberal Democratic Party	13,342	7.5
124	Podolsk single-mandate constituency	Moscow Oblast	Irina Tyutkova	Communist Party	22,049	12.4
124	Podolsk single-mandate constituency	Moscow Oblast	Viacheslav Fetisov	United Russia	98,175	55.4
125	Sergiyev Posad single-mandate constituency	Moscow Oblast	Vladimir Bobrovnik	Patriots of Russia	3,125	1.8
125	Sergiyev Posad single-mandate constituency	Moscow Oblast	Olga Boldyreva	Communists of Russia	8,909	5.0
125	Sergiyev Posad single-mandate constituency	Moscow Oblast	Tatyana Gorovets	Party of Growth	5,569	3.1
125	Sergiyev Posad single-mandate constituency	Moscow Oblast	Vyacheslav Kovtun	A Just Russia	9,283	5.2
125	Sergiyev Posad single-mandate constituency	Moscow Oblast	Sergey Kryzhov	Yabloko	9,346	5.3
125	Sergiyev Posad single-mandate constituency	Moscow Oblast	Valery Kubarev	Greens	3,683	2.1
125	Sergiyev Posad single-mandate constituency	Moscow Oblast	Sergey Pakhomov	United Russia	88,536	49.8
125	Sergiyev Posad single-mandate constituency	Moscow Oblast	Ivan Petrov	Liberal Democratic Party	16,473	9.3
125	Sergiyev Posad single-mandate constituency	Moscow Oblast	Anastasia Preobrazhenskaya	Communist Party	24,045	13.5
125	Sergiyev Posad single-mandate constituency	Moscow Oblast	Andrey Shalnev	People's Freedom Party	8,939	5.0
126	Serpukhov single-mandate constituency	Moscow Oblast	Irina Vologdina	Greens	5,700	3.4
126	Serpukhov single-mandate constituency	Moscow Oblast	Pavel Zalesov	A Just Russia	20,908	12.3
126	Serpukhov single-mandate constituency	Moscow Oblast	Boris Ivanyuzhenkov	Communist Party	21,330	12.6
126	Serpukhov single-mandate constituency	Moscow Oblast	Nikolay Kuznetsov	Yabloko	9,879	5.8
126	Serpukhov single-mandate constituency	Moscow Oblast	Yury Oleynikov	United Russia	71,019	41.8
126	Serpukhov single-mandate constituency	Moscow Oblast	Anna Redchenko	Liberal Democratic Party	15,334	9.0
126	Serpukhov single-mandate constituency	Moscow Oblast	Tatyana Rybina	Communists of Russia	8,599	5.1
126	Serpukhov single-mandate constituency	Moscow Oblast	Larisa Svintsova	Patriots of Russia	2,463	1.5
126	Serpukhov single-mandate constituency	Moscow Oblast	Pavel Khlyupin	Rodina	6,552	3.9
126	Serpukhov single-mandate constituency	Moscow Oblast	Lyudmila Chumakova	Party of Growth	4,832	2.8
126	Serpukhov single-mandate constituency	Moscow Oblast	Lev Shchukin	People's Freedom Party	3,100	1.8
127	Shchyolkovo single-mandate constituency	Moscow Oblast	Oleg Volkov	A Just Russia	20,519	11.9
127	Shchyolkovo single-mandate constituency	Moscow Oblast	Nikolay Garankin	Greens	6,267	3.6
127	Shchyolkovo single-mandate constituency	Moscow Oblast	Georgy Goryachevsky	Rodina	6,530	3.8
127	Shchyolkovo single-mandate constituency	Moscow Oblast	Natalya Yeremeytseva	Communist Party	43,144	25.0
127	Shchyolkovo single-mandate constituency	Moscow Oblast	Sergey Zhigarev	Liberal Democratic Party	62,049	35.9
127	Shchyolkovo single-mandate constituency	Moscow Oblast	Irina Kukushkina	Yabloko	9,693	5.6
127	Shchyolkovo single-mandate constituency	Moscow Oblast	Pavel Seliverstov	Communists of Russia	7,690	4.5
127	Shchyolkovo single-mandate constituency	Moscow Oblast	Lyubov Filipp	Party of Growth	8,511	4.9
127	Shchyolkovo single-mandate constituency	Moscow Oblast	Oleg Shirokov	Patriots of Russia	8,235	4.8
128	Murmansk single-mandate constituency	Murmansk Oblast	Maxim Belov	Liberal Democratic Party	38,052	16.3
128	Murmansk single-mandate constituency	Murmansk Oblast	Alexey Veller	United Russia	108,555	46.5
128	Murmansk single-mandate constituency	Murmansk Oblast	Oleg Drozdov	Yabloko	7,431	3.2
128	Murmansk single-mandate constituency	Murmansk Oblast	Andrey Kapitonov	People's Freedom Party	4,383	1.9
128	Murmansk single-mandate constituency	Murmansk Oblast	Alexander Makarevich	A Just Russia	26,415	11.3
128	Murmansk single-mandate constituency	Murmansk Oblast	Igor Morar	Civic Platform	10,804	4.6
128	Murmansk single-mandate constituency	Murmansk Oblast	Sergey Pakhomov	Rodina	6,781	2.9
128	Murmansk single-mandate constituency	Murmansk Oblast	Gennady Stepakhno	Communist Party	31,277	13.4
129	Nizhny Novgorod single-mandate constituency	Nizhny Novgorod Oblast	Alexander Bochkaryov	A Just Russia	41,404	20.9
129	Nizhny Novgorod single-mandate constituency	Nizhny Novgorod Oblast	Denis Voronenkov	Communist Party	28,878	14.6
129	Nizhny Novgorod single-mandate constituency	Nizhny Novgorod Oblast	Valery Kuznetsov	Party of Growth	6,824	3.4
129	Nizhny Novgorod single-mandate constituency	Nizhny Novgorod Oblast	Alexey Molev	Rodina	4,072	2.1
129	Nizhny Novgorod single-mandate constituency	Nizhny Novgorod Oblast	Dmitry Nikolaev	Liberal Democratic Party	15,127	7.6
129	Nizhny Novgorod single-mandate constituency	Nizhny Novgorod Oblast	Vladimir Panov	United Russia	87,475	44.2
129	Nizhny Novgorod single-mandate constituency	Nizhny Novgorod Oblast	Anna Stepanova	People's Freedom Party	7,068	3.6
129	Nizhny Novgorod single-mandate constituency	Nizhny Novgorod Oblast	Ilya Ulyanov	Communists of Russia	695	0.4
130	Prioksky single-mandate constituency	Nizhny Novgorod Oblast	Pavel Belov	Liberal Democratic Party	21,490	8.2
130	Prioksky single-mandate constituency	Nizhny Novgorod Oblast	Igor Bogdanov	A Just Russia	19,786	7.5
130	Prioksky single-mandate constituency	Nizhny Novgorod Oblast	Valeriya Zaytseva	Civic Platform	2,433	0.9
130	Prioksky single-mandate constituency	Nizhny Novgorod Oblast	Mikhail Kuznetsov	Patriots of Russia	5,822	2.2
130	Prioksky single-mandate constituency	Nizhny Novgorod Oblast	Anna Ludina	People's Freedom Party	3,104	1.2
130	Prioksky single-mandate constituency	Nizhny Novgorod Oblast	Denis Moskvin	United Russia	172,119	65.5
130	Prioksky single-mandate constituency	Nizhny Novgorod Oblast	Irina Murakhtaeva	Yabloko	3,468	1.3
130	Prioksky single-mandate constituency	Nizhny Novgorod Oblast	Roman Fomin	Communist Party	21,251	8.1
130	Prioksky single-mandate constituency	Nizhny Novgorod Oblast	Alexander Tsapanov	Rodina	4,376	1.7
130	Prioksky single-mandate constituency	Nizhny Novgorod Oblast	Svetlana Yudina	Communists of Russia	8,745	3.3
131	Avtozavodsky single-mandate constituency	Nizhny Novgorod Oblast	Vyacheslav Burmistrov	People's Freedom Party	9,871	4.4
131	Avtozavodsky single-mandate constituency	Nizhny Novgorod Oblast	Igor Goncharov	Yabloko	4,364	1.9
131	Avtozavodsky single-mandate constituency	Nizhny Novgorod Oblast	Alexander Kosovskikh	Party of Growth	4,968	2.2
131	Avtozavodsky single-mandate constituency	Nizhny Novgorod Oblast	Natalya Nazarova	United Russia	118,572	52.9
131	Avtozavodsky single-mandate constituency	Nizhny Novgorod Oblast	Ilya Pomerantsev	Civilian Power	2,101	0.9
131	Avtozavodsky single-mandate constituency	Nizhny Novgorod Oblast	Vladimir Ponomaryov	Rodina	4,928	2.2
131	Avtozavodsky single-mandate constituency	Nizhny Novgorod Oblast	Alexander Razumovsky	A Just Russia	22,132	9.9
131	Avtozavodsky single-mandate constituency	Nizhny Novgorod Oblast	Nikolay Ryabov	Communist Party	30,877	13.8
131	Avtozavodsky single-mandate constituency	Nizhny Novgorod Oblast	Yevgeny Smirnov	Greens	3,403	1.5
131	Avtozavodsky single-mandate constituency	Nizhny Novgorod Oblast	Nazhiya Fazulzhanova	Communists of Russia	4,817	2.2
131	Avtozavodsky single-mandate constituency	Nizhny Novgorod Oblast	Mikhail Shatilov	Liberal Democratic Party	17,993	8.0
132	Kanavinsky single-mandate constituency	Nizhny Novgorod Oblast	Sergey Almaev	Rodina	9,426	4.9
132	Kanavinsky single-mandate constituency	Nizhny Novgorod Oblast	Vladislav Atmakhov	Liberal Democratic Party	14,618	7.5
132	Kanavinsky single-mandate constituency	Nizhny Novgorod Oblast	Vadim Bulavinov	United Russia	113,127	58.4
132	Kanavinsky single-mandate constituency	Nizhny Novgorod Oblast	Artur Yeranosyan	Communists of Russia	4,374	2.3
132	Kanavinsky single-mandate constituency	Nizhny Novgorod Oblast	Sergey Luzin	Party of Growth	3,237	1.7
132	Kanavinsky single-mandate constituency	Nizhny Novgorod Oblast	Alexander Tarnaev	Communist Party	28,844	14.9
132	Kanavinsky single-mandate constituency	Nizhny Novgorod Oblast	Andrey Khomov	Yabloko	4,340	2.2
132	Kanavinsky single-mandate constituency	Nizhny Novgorod Oblast	Anatoly Shein	A Just Russia	15,836	8.2
133	Bor single-mandate constituency	Nizhny Novgorod Oblast	Alexey Vetoshkin	Yabloko	6,292	2.6
133	Bor single-mandate constituency	Nizhny Novgorod Oblast	Roman Zykov	Patriots of Russia	3,569	1.5
133	Bor single-mandate constituency	Nizhny Novgorod Oblast	Artyom Kavinov	United Russia	148,499	61.4
133	Bor single-mandate constituency	Nizhny Novgorod Oblast	Kirill Lychagin	A Just Russia	10,444	4.3
133	Bor single-mandate constituency	Nizhny Novgorod Oblast	Irina Sevridova	Party of Growth	4,823	2.0
133	Bor single-mandate constituency	Nizhny Novgorod Oblast	Mikhail Sukharev	Communist Party	27,920	11.5
133	Bor single-mandate constituency	Nizhny Novgorod Oblast	Dmitry Chugrin	Liberal Democratic Party	26,904	11.1
133	Bor single-mandate constituency	Nizhny Novgorod Oblast	Viktor Shamov	Rodina	5,405	2.2
133	Bor single-mandate constituency	Nizhny Novgorod Oblast	Sergey Yudin	Communists of Russia	7,976	3.3
134	Novgorod single-mandate constituency	Novgorod Oblast	Alexey Afanasyev	A Just Russia	33,067	17.1
134	Novgorod single-mandate constituency	Novgorod Oblast	Yevgeny Bogdanov	Party of Growth	12,624	6.5
134	Novgorod single-mandate constituency	Novgorod Oblast	Sergey Boyarov	Liberal Democratic Party	23,531	12.2
134	Novgorod single-mandate constituency	Novgorod Oblast	Sergey Dobrovolsky	People's Freedom Party	4,031	2.1
134	Novgorod single-mandate constituency	Novgorod Oblast	Vyacheslav Ivanov	Communists of Russia	12,557	6.5
134	Novgorod single-mandate constituency	Novgorod Oblast	Alexander Korovnikov	United Russia	75,284	39.0
134	Novgorod single-mandate constituency	Novgorod Oblast	Nikolay Stolyarov	Civic Platform	2,178	1.1
134	Novgorod single-mandate constituency	Novgorod Oblast	Konstantin Khivrich	Yabloko	7,212	3.7
134	Novgorod single-mandate constituency	Novgorod Oblast	Andrey Shustrov	Communist Party	22,495	11.7
135	Novosibirsk single-mandate constituency	Novosibirsk Oblast	Aydar Barantaev	People's Freedom Party	2,744	1.5
135	Novosibirsk single-mandate constituency	Novosibirsk Oblast	Sergey Boyko	Yabloko	6,189	3.5
135	Novosibirsk single-mandate constituency	Novosibirsk Oblast	Olesya Dumchenko	Greens	3,522	2.0
135	Novosibirsk single-mandate constituency	Novosibirsk Oblast	Dmitry Yevtushenko	Civilian Power	2,033	1.1
135	Novosibirsk single-mandate constituency	Novosibirsk Oblast	Andrey Zhirnov	Communist Party	51,063	28.7
135	Novosibirsk single-mandate constituency	Novosibirsk Oblast	Andrey Kalichenko	United Russia	68,579	38.6
135	Novosibirsk single-mandate constituency	Novosibirsk Oblast	Nataliya Krasovskaya	Liberal Democratic Party	20,788	11.7
135	Novosibirsk single-mandate constituency	Novosibirsk Oblast	Georgy Mikhailov	Communists of Russia	7,265	4.1
135	Novosibirsk single-mandate constituency	Novosibirsk Oblast	Vasily Soroka	Rodina	6,525	3.7
135	Novosibirsk single-mandate constituency	Novosibirsk Oblast	Dmitry Stakanovsky	A Just Russia	7,551	4.2
135	Novosibirsk single-mandate constituency	Novosibirsk Oblast	Lyubov Ukhalova	Patriots of Russia	1,550	0.9
136	Central single-mandate constituency	Novosibirsk Oblast	Olga Vakulenko	Greens	6,712	3.9
136	Central single-mandate constituency	Novosibirsk Oblast	Sergey Dyachkov	People's Freedom Party	3,712	2.1
136	Central single-mandate constituency	Novosibirsk Oblast	Maxim Kudryavtsev	United Russia	66,134	38.2
136	Central single-mandate constituency	Novosibirsk Oblast	Sergey Loskutov	Communists of Russia	10,745	6.2
136	Central single-mandate constituency	Novosibirsk Oblast	Pavel Pyatnitsky	Rodina	7,096	4.1
136	Central single-mandate constituency	Novosibirsk Oblast	Dmitry Savelyev	Liberal Democratic Party	38,773	22.4
136	Central single-mandate constituency	Novosibirsk Oblast	Vadim Skurikhin	Patriots of Russia	1,958	1.1
136	Central single-mandate constituency	Novosibirsk Oblast	Renat Suleymanov	Communist Party	32,864	19.0
136	Central single-mandate constituency	Novosibirsk Oblast	Gennady Shishebarov	Yabloko	5,158	3.0
137	Iskitim single-mandate constituency	Novosibirsk Oblast	Alexander Abalakov	Communist Party	32,041	17.3
137	Iskitim single-mandate constituency	Novosibirsk Oblast	Ivan Grichukov	Civilian Power	1,082	0.6
137	Iskitim single-mandate constituency	Novosibirsk Oblast	Danil Ivanov	A Just Russia	16,452	8.9
137	Iskitim single-mandate constituency	Novosibirsk Oblast	Aleksandr Karelin	United Russia	87,324	47.1
137	Iskitim single-mandate constituency	Novosibirsk Oblast	Lyudmila Loskutova	Communists of Russia	8,280	4.5
137	Iskitim single-mandate constituency	Novosibirsk Oblast	Anatoly Madin	Civic Platform	1,524	0.8
137	Iskitim single-mandate constituency	Novosibirsk Oblast	Yegor Savin	People's Freedom Party	5,980	3.2
137	Iskitim single-mandate constituency	Novosibirsk Oblast	Oleg Suvorov	Liberal Democratic Party	24,540	13.2
137	Iskitim single-mandate constituency	Novosibirsk Oblast	Mikhail Khazin	Rodina	5,503	3.0
137	Iskitim single-mandate constituency	Novosibirsk Oblast	Igor Yazykovsky	Greens	2,562	1.4
138	Barabinsk single-mandate constituency	Novosibirsk Oblast	Bulat Barantaev	People's Freedom Party	3,324	2.1
138	Barabinsk single-mandate constituency	Novosibirsk Oblast	Alexander Vandakurov	A Just Russia	12,559	7.8
138	Barabinsk single-mandate constituency	Novosibirsk Oblast	Dmitry Golovanev	Liberal Democratic Party	26,976	16.7
138	Barabinsk single-mandate constituency	Novosibirsk Oblast	Viktor Ignatov	United Russia	66,919	41.5
138	Barabinsk single-mandate constituency	Novosibirsk Oblast	Dmitry Lukashev	Rodina	6,325	3.9
138	Barabinsk single-mandate constituency	Novosibirsk Oblast	Dmitry Popov	Patriots of Russia	2,660	1.7
138	Barabinsk single-mandate constituency	Novosibirsk Oblast	Dmitry Kholyavchenko	Yabloko	3,498	2.2
138	Barabinsk single-mandate constituency	Novosibirsk Oblast	Olga Shmendel	Communists of Russia	10,425	6.5
138	Barabinsk single-mandate constituency	Novosibirsk Oblast	Roman Yakovlev	Communist Party	28,511	17.7
139	Omsk single-mandate constituency	Omsk Oblast	Andrey Alekhin	Communist Party	56,021	31.7
139	Omsk single-mandate constituency	Omsk Oblast	Nikolay Artemyev	Civic Platform	3,045	1.7
139	Omsk single-mandate constituency	Omsk Oblast	Alexander Barkov	Communists of Russia	6,422	3.6
139	Omsk single-mandate constituency	Omsk Oblast	Igor Basov	People's Freedom Party	3,347	1.9
139	Omsk single-mandate constituency	Omsk Oblast	Dmitry Gorovtsov	A Just Russia	15,516	8.8
139	Omsk single-mandate constituency	Omsk Oblast	Tatyana Yeryomenko	Party of Growth	6,699	3.8
139	Omsk single-mandate constituency	Omsk Oblast	Alexey Klepikov	Liberal Democratic Party	22,335	12.6
139	Omsk single-mandate constituency	Omsk Oblast	Sergey Kostarev	Yabloko	5,717	3.2
139	Omsk single-mandate constituency	Omsk Oblast	Viktor Shreyder	United Russia	57,552	32.6
140	Moskalenki single-mandate constituency	Omsk Oblast	Sergey Astashenko	People's Freedom Party	4,647	2.5
140	Moskalenki single-mandate constituency	Omsk Oblast	Kirill Atamanichenko	Liberal Democratic Party	27,735	15.1
140	Moskalenki single-mandate constituency	Omsk Oblast	Yevgeny Dubovsky	A Just Russia	28,947	15.8
140	Moskalenki single-mandate constituency	Omsk Oblast	Vladimir Zhukov	Communists of Russia	20,466	11.2
140	Moskalenki single-mandate constituency	Omsk Oblast	Oleg Kurnyavko	Civic Platform	4,621	2.5
140	Moskalenki single-mandate constituency	Omsk Oblast	Tatyana Ogarkova	Party of Growth	9,021	4.9
140	Moskalenki single-mandate constituency	Omsk Oblast	Oleg Smolin	Communist Party	87,848	47.9
141	Lyubinsky single-mandate constituency	Omsk Oblast	Olga Argat	People's Freedom Party	3,405	1.6
141	Lyubinsky single-mandate constituency	Omsk Oblast	Andrey Golushko	United Russia	92,684	44.9
141	Lyubinsky single-mandate constituency	Omsk Oblast	Oleg Denisenko	Communist Party	50,396	24.4
141	Lyubinsky single-mandate constituency	Omsk Oblast	Oleg Kolesnikov	Civic Platform	2,430	1.2
141	Lyubinsky single-mandate constituency	Omsk Oblast	Sergey Kochetkov	Party of Growth	3,519	1.7
141	Lyubinsky single-mandate constituency	Omsk Oblast	Alexander Kravtsov	A Just Russia	13,709	6.6
141	Lyubinsky single-mandate constituency	Omsk Oblast	Alexey Lozhkin	Liberal Democratic Party	24,451	11.8
141	Lyubinsky single-mandate constituency	Omsk Oblast	Boris Melnikov	Yabloko	3,413	1.7
141	Lyubinsky single-mandate constituency	Omsk Oblast	Alexander Podzorov	Communists of Russia	10,076	4.9
141	Lyubinsky single-mandate constituency	Omsk Oblast	Alexey Yakimenko	Rodina	2,494	1.2
142	Orenburg single-mandate constituency	Orenburg Oblast	Maxim Amelin	Communist Party	24,567	11.7
142	Orenburg single-mandate constituency	Orenburg Oblast	Alexander Kalinin	Communists of Russia	16,578	7.9
142	Orenburg single-mandate constituency	Orenburg Oblast	Alexander Karpov	Liberal Democratic Party	33,108	15.8
142	Orenburg single-mandate constituency	Orenburg Oblast	Yury Mishcheryakov	United Russia	92,564	44.1
142	Orenburg single-mandate constituency	Orenburg Oblast	Anton Rychagov	Rodina	3,316	1.6
142	Orenburg single-mandate constituency	Orenburg Oblast	Sergey Stolpak	People's Freedom Party	2,200	1.0
142	Orenburg single-mandate constituency	Orenburg Oblast	Vladimir Tishin	Yabloko	5,162	2.5
142	Orenburg single-mandate constituency	Orenburg Oblast	Sergey Fomin	Party of Growth	4,759	2.3
142	Orenburg single-mandate constituency	Orenburg Oblast	Vladimir Frolov	A Just Russia	24,333	11.6
142	Orenburg single-mandate constituency	Orenburg Oblast	Sergey Khimich	Patriots of Russia	3,352	1.6
143	Buguruslan single-mandate constituency	Orenburg Oblast	Faik Asyaev	A Just Russia	14,273	6.1
143	Buguruslan single-mandate constituency	Orenburg Oblast	Tatyana Golovina	Rodina	4,849	2.1
143	Buguruslan single-mandate constituency	Orenburg Oblast	Sergey Katasonov	Liberal Democratic Party	57,705	24.6
143	Buguruslan single-mandate constituency	Orenburg Oblast	Irina Klimova	People's Freedom Party	4,698	2.0
143	Buguruslan single-mandate constituency	Orenburg Oblast	Georgy Lazarov	Yabloko	3,426	1.5
143	Buguruslan single-mandate constituency	Orenburg Oblast	Nurlan Munzhasarov	Communists of Russia	10,864	4.6
143	Buguruslan single-mandate constituency	Orenburg Oblast	Igor Sukharev	United Russia	100,425	42.8
143	Buguruslan single-mandate constituency	Orenburg Oblast	Didar Turshinov	Party of Growth	2,224	0.9
143	Buguruslan single-mandate constituency	Orenburg Oblast	Semyon Uralov	Communist Party	32,264	13.7
143	Buguruslan single-mandate constituency	Orenburg Oblast	Maxim Shchepinov	Patriots of Russia	4,079	1.7
144	Orsk single-mandate constituency	Orenburg Oblast	Sergey Bentsman	Patriots of Russia	6,879	3.7
144	Orsk single-mandate constituency	Orenburg Oblast	Viktor Zavarzin	United Russia	86,334	46.1
144	Orsk single-mandate constituency	Orenburg Oblast	Alexander Ivanov	Communist Party	37,147	19.8
144	Orsk single-mandate constituency	Orenburg Oblast	Ruslan Ismagilov	Yabloko	5,609	3.0
144	Orsk single-mandate constituency	Orenburg Oblast	Kayrat Kulakhmetov	A Just Russia	17,725	9.5
144	Orsk single-mandate constituency	Orenburg Oblast	Vladimir Mirokhin	Liberal Democratic Party	25,862	13.8
144	Orsk single-mandate constituency	Orenburg Oblast	Sergey Netesanov	Party of Growth	3,187	1.7
144	Orsk single-mandate constituency	Orenburg Oblast	Olga Rybalko	People's Freedom Party	4,623	2.5
145	Oryol single-mandate constituency	Oryol Oblast	Mikhail Vakarev	Communists of Russia	13,313	4.0
145	Oryol single-mandate constituency	Oryol Oblast	Vasily Ikonnikov	Communist Party	69,348	21.1
145	Oryol single-mandate constituency	Oryol Oblast	Alexander Kirillov	Yabloko	6,971	2.1
145	Oryol single-mandate constituency	Oryol Oblast	Nikolay Kovalyov	United Russia	159,658	48.5
145	Oryol single-mandate constituency	Oryol Oblast	Igor Komov	People's Freedom Party	4,753	1.4
145	Oryol single-mandate constituency	Oryol Oblast	Andrey Korneyev	Party of Growth	6,160	1.9
145	Oryol single-mandate constituency	Oryol Oblast	Andrey Kutsyn	Liberal Democratic Party	31,724	9.6
145	Oryol single-mandate constituency	Oryol Oblast	Viktor Motorny	Rodina	4,174	1.3
145	Oryol single-mandate constituency	Oryol Oblast	Ruslan Perelygin	A Just Russia	27,344	8.3
145	Oryol single-mandate constituency	Oryol Oblast	Igor Fyodorov	Civic Platform	5,626	1.7
146	Penza single-mandate constituency	Penza Oblast	Anatoly Aleksyutin	Greens	6,069	1.9
146	Penza single-mandate constituency	Penza Oblast	Sergey Yesyakov	United Russia	205,575	65.6
146	Penza single-mandate constituency	Penza Oblast	Georgy Kamnev	Communist Party	42,990	13.7
146	Penza single-mandate constituency	Penza Oblast	Lyudmila Kolomytseva	A Just Russia	26,443	8.4
146	Penza single-mandate constituency	Penza Oblast	Sergey Korobov	Patriots of Russia	3,655	1.2
146	Penza single-mandate constituency	Penza Oblast	Pavel Kulikov	Liberal Democratic Party	18,580	5.9
146	Penza single-mandate constituency	Penza Oblast	Andrey Nikiforov	Communists of Russia	6,172	2.0
146	Penza single-mandate constituency	Penza Oblast	Alexey Pakaev	Rodina	4,035	1.3
147	Lermontovsky single-mandate constituency	Penza Oblast	Alexander Vasilyev	Liberal Democratic Party	35,290	10.8
147	Lermontovsky single-mandate constituency	Penza Oblast	Dmitry Gaynullin	Party of Growth	7,906	2.4
147	Lermontovsky single-mandate constituency	Penza Oblast	Viktoriya Dobrovolskaya	Communists of Russia	20,185	6.2
147	Lermontovsky single-mandate constituency	Penza Oblast	Leonid Levin	A Just Russia	208,466	63.8
147	Lermontovsky single-mandate constituency	Penza Oblast	Andrey Mamonov	Rodina	8,712	2.7
147	Lermontovsky single-mandate constituency	Penza Oblast	Vasily Melnichenko	Greens	5,057	1.5
147	Lermontovsky single-mandate constituency	Penza Oblast	Dmitry Filyaev	Communist Party	41,214	12.6
148	Pskov single-mandate constituency	Pskov Oblast	Oleg Bryachak	A Just Russia	28,819	13.0
148	Pskov single-mandate constituency	Pskov Oblast	Konstantin Vilkov	Rodina	3,636	1.6
148	Pskov single-mandate constituency	Pskov Oblast	Anna Galkina	Civic Platform	2,886	1.3
148	Pskov single-mandate constituency	Pskov Oblast	Vyacheslav Yevdokimenko	Communists of Russia	11,701	5.3
148	Pskov single-mandate constituency	Pskov Oblast	Alexander Kozlovsky	United Russia	94,372	42.4
148	Pskov single-mandate constituency	Pskov Oblast	Vasily Krasnov	Party of Growth	2,805	1.3
148	Pskov single-mandate constituency	Pskov Oblast	Remm Malyshkin	Greens	2,015	0.9
148	Pskov single-mandate constituency	Pskov Oblast	Anton Minakov	Liberal Democratic Party	21,463	9.6
148	Pskov single-mandate constituency	Pskov Oblast	Alexander Rogov	Communist Party	33,472	15.0
148	Pskov single-mandate constituency	Pskov Oblast	Biysultan Khamzaev	Civilian Power	1,222	0.5
148	Pskov single-mandate constituency	Pskov Oblast	Mikhail Khoronen	Patriots of Russia	6,415	2.9
148	Pskov single-mandate constituency	Pskov Oblast	Lev Schlosberg	Yabloko	13,669	6.1
149	Rostov single-mandate constituency	Rostov Oblast	Pavel Volkov	Communists of Russia	8,369	3.6
149	Rostov single-mandate constituency	Rostov Oblast	Vyacheslav Voloshchuk	Civic Platform	1,783	0.8
149	Rostov single-mandate constituency	Rostov Oblast	Sergey Ivanov	Liberal Democratic Party	19,308	8.4
149	Rostov single-mandate constituency	Rostov Oblast	Anatoli Kotlyarov	A Just Russia	9,408	4.1
149	Rostov single-mandate constituency	Rostov Oblast	Stanislav Krylov	Party of Growth	2,301	1.0
149	Rostov single-mandate constituency	Rostov Oblast	Alexander Musienko	Yabloko	3,870	1.7
149	Rostov single-mandate constituency	Rostov Oblast	Sergey Novikov	Greens	2,154	0.9
149	Rostov single-mandate constituency	Rostov Oblast	Larisa Tutova	United Russia	161,402	70.2
149	Rostov single-mandate constituency	Rostov Oblast	Grigory Fomenko	Communist Party	21,251	9.2
150	Nizhnedonskoy single-mandate constituency	Rostov Oblast	Evgeny Bessonov	Communist Party	41,439	17.6
150	Nizhnedonskoy single-mandate constituency	Rostov Oblast	Dmitry Velichko	Party of Growth	6,783	2.9
150	Nizhnedonskoy single-mandate constituency	Rostov Oblast	Alexey Dudarev	Rodina	6,685	2.8
150	Nizhnedonskoy single-mandate constituency	Rostov Oblast	Mikhail Yemelyanov	A Just Russia	139,095	58.9
150	Nizhnedonskoy single-mandate constituency	Rostov Oblast	Yury Kolobrodov	Patriots of Russia	4,604	1.9
150	Nizhnedonskoy single-mandate constituency	Rostov Oblast	Alexey Pelipenko	Communists of Russia	6,836	2.9
150	Nizhnedonskoy single-mandate constituency	Rostov Oblast	Andrey Sklyarov	Yabloko	6,841	2.9
150	Nizhnedonskoy single-mandate constituency	Rostov Oblast	Igor Teperechkin	Liberal Democratic Party	23,823	10.1
151	Taganrog single-mandate constituency	Rostov Oblast	Alexander Bezruchenko	Civic Platform	1,907	1.1
151	Taganrog single-mandate constituency	Rostov Oblast	Yuliya Vasilchenko	Liberal Democratic Party	18,917	10.6
151	Taganrog single-mandate constituency	Rostov Oblast	Alexey Zaydlin	Communists of Russia	4,139	2.3
151	Taganrog single-mandate constituency	Rostov Oblast	Yury Kobzev	United Russia	85,849	48.3
151	Taganrog single-mandate constituency	Rostov Oblast	Nikolay Kolomeitsev	Communist Party	38,549	21.7
151	Taganrog single-mandate constituency	Rostov Oblast	Pyotr Malyshevsky	Greens	2,298	1.3
151	Taganrog single-mandate constituency	Rostov Oblast	Valery Meleshko	Rodina	4,558	2.6
151	Taganrog single-mandate constituency	Rostov Oblast	Alexander Pitsenko	A Just Russia	16,020	9.0
151	Taganrog single-mandate constituency	Rostov Oblast	Arnold Reyzvig	Patriots of Russia	1,200	0.7
151	Taganrog single-mandate constituency	Rostov Oblast	Sergey Shalygin	Yabloko	4,222	2.4
152	South single-mandate constituency	Rostov Oblast	Stanislav Avramenko	People's Freedom Party	2,931	1.4
152	South single-mandate constituency	Rostov Oblast	Vladimir Bazarov	Patriots of Russia	3,093	1.5
152	South single-mandate constituency	Rostov Oblast	Vladimir Bessonov	Communist Party	39,750	19.1
152	South single-mandate constituency	Rostov Oblast	Gennady Zubov	Rodina	11,230	5.4
152	South single-mandate constituency	Rostov Oblast	Vladimir Ignatkin	Yabloko	3,690	1.8
152	South single-mandate constituency	Rostov Oblast	Vladimir Kozaev	Communists of Russia	3,858	1.9
152	South single-mandate constituency	Rostov Oblast	Yegor Kolesnikov	Liberal Democratic Party	21,172	10.2
152	South single-mandate constituency	Rostov Oblast	Andrey Kutyrev	Independent	5,007	2.4
152	South single-mandate constituency	Rostov Oblast	Alexey Lyashchenko	A Just Russia	10,373	5.0
152	South single-mandate constituency	Rostov Oblast	Tatyana Cherepanova	Civic Platform	3,006	1.4
152	South single-mandate constituency	Rostov Oblast	Mikhail Chernyshyov	United Russia	103,751	49.9
153	Belaya Kalitva single-mandate constituency	Rostov Oblast	Vladimir Averchenko	Rodina	7,302	2.8
153	Belaya Kalitva single-mandate constituency	Rostov Oblast	Anatoly Borodachev	Liberal Democratic Party	22,497	8.6
153	Belaya Kalitva single-mandate constituency	Rostov Oblast	Igor Kataev	Communists of Russia	7,997	3.1
153	Belaya Kalitva single-mandate constituency	Rostov Oblast	Dmitry Korochensky	Civic Platform	2,079	0.8
153	Belaya Kalitva single-mandate constituency	Rostov Oblast	Sergey Kosinov	A Just Russia	8,323	3.2
153	Belaya Kalitva single-mandate constituency	Rostov Oblast	Denis Chebotaryov	Patriots of Russia	3,489	1.3
153	Belaya Kalitva single-mandate constituency	Rostov Oblast	Sergey Shapovalov	Communist Party	24,565	9.4
153	Belaya Kalitva single-mandate constituency	Rostov Oblast	Alexander Sholokhov	United Russia	184,670	70.8
154	Shakhty single-mandate constituency	Rostov Oblast	Sergey Anipko	Civic Platform	1,992	1.0
154	Shakhty single-mandate constituency	Rostov Oblast	Nikolay Maslinnikov	A Just Russia	11,197	5.5
154	Shakhty single-mandate constituency	Rostov Oblast	Alfred Minin	Greens	2,201	1.1
154	Shakhty single-mandate constituency	Rostov Oblast	Sergey Sarabyev	Patriots of Russia	2,841	1.4
154	Shakhty single-mandate constituency	Rostov Oblast	Mikhail Sorokin	Liberal Democratic Party	22,186	11.0
154	Shakhty single-mandate constituency	Rostov Oblast	Alexander Tishchenko	Rodina	3,654	1.8
154	Shakhty single-mandate constituency	Rostov Oblast	Georgy Khugaev	Communists of Russia	5,411	2.7
154	Shakhty single-mandate constituency	Rostov Oblast	Maxim Shchablykin	United Russia	128,865	63.6
154	Shakhty single-mandate constituency	Rostov Oblast	Gennady Shcherbakov	Communist Party	24,217	12.0
155	Volgodonsk single-mandate constituency	Rostov Oblast	Alexander Dedovich	Communist Party	27,586	14.0
155	Volgodonsk single-mandate constituency	Rostov Oblast	Viktor Deryabkin	United Russia	91,832	46.5
155	Volgodonsk single-mandate constituency	Rostov Oblast	Yuri Koshelnikov	Greens	4,458	2.3
155	Volgodonsk single-mandate constituency	Rostov Oblast	Alexey Lyutov	Rodina	5,465	2.8
155	Volgodonsk single-mandate constituency	Rostov Oblast	Sergey Malykhin	Liberal Democratic Party	18,315	9.3
155	Volgodonsk single-mandate constituency	Rostov Oblast	Oleg Pakholkov	A Just Russia	42,302	21.4
155	Volgodonsk single-mandate constituency	Rostov Oblast	Vyacheslav Stepanenko	Civic Platform	2,504	1.3
155	Volgodonsk single-mandate constituency	Rostov Oblast	Roman Yatsenko	Communists of Russia	5,224	2.6
156	Ryazan single-mandate constituency	Ryazan Oblast	Galina Gnuskina	Communist Party	29,841	15.1
156	Ryazan single-mandate constituency	Ryazan Oblast	Denis Desinov	Communists of Russia	9,703	4.9
156	Ryazan single-mandate constituency	Ryazan Oblast	Mariya Yepifanova	Yabloko	7,060	3.6
156	Ryazan single-mandate constituency	Ryazan Oblast	Yury Kravchenko	Liberal Democratic Party	25,743	13.0
156	Ryazan single-mandate constituency	Ryazan Oblast	Andrei Krasov	United Russia	99,768	50.5
156	Ryazan single-mandate constituency	Ryazan Oblast	Irina Kusova	People's Freedom Party	4,738	2.4
156	Ryazan single-mandate constituency	Ryazan Oblast	Andrey Lyablin	A Just Russia	12,787	6.5
156	Ryazan single-mandate constituency	Ryazan Oblast	Vladimir Rogov	Rodina	5,449	2.8
156	Ryazan single-mandate constituency	Ryazan Oblast	Andrey Tumashev	Greens	2,391	1.2
157	Skopin single-mandate constituency	Ryazan Oblast	Valentin Baymetov	Yabloko	4,021	2.1
157	Skopin single-mandate constituency	Ryazan Oblast	Vladimir Denisenko	Greens	3,320	1.7
157	Skopin single-mandate constituency	Ryazan Oblast	Galina Lukyanova	Communists of Russia	7,997	4.1
157	Skopin single-mandate constituency	Ryazan Oblast	Yelena Mitina	United Russia	95,645	49.6
157	Skopin single-mandate constituency	Ryazan Oblast	Alexander Samokhin	People's Freedom Party	3,674	1.9
157	Skopin single-mandate constituency	Ryazan Oblast	Igor Tambovtsev	Party of Growth	2,363	1.2
157	Skopin single-mandate constituency	Ryazan Oblast	Alexander Tyurin	Rodina	4,152	2.2
157	Skopin single-mandate constituency	Ryazan Oblast	Vladimir Fedotkin	Communist Party	31,839	16.5
157	Skopin single-mandate constituency	Ryazan Oblast	Nataliya Tsvetkova	A Just Russia	11,932	6.2
157	Skopin single-mandate constituency	Ryazan Oblast	Alexander Sherin	Liberal Democratic Party	27,938	14.5
158	Samara single-mandate constituency	Samara Oblast	Vadim Baykov	Communists of Russia	11,781	5.1
158	Samara single-mandate constituency	Samara Oblast	Pyotr Vasilyev	Party of Growth	4,488	1.9
158	Samara single-mandate constituency	Samara Oblast	Yekaterina Gerasimova	People's Freedom Party	5,843	2.5
158	Samara single-mandate constituency	Samara Oblast	Vladimir Dovbysh	Greens	4,096	1.8
158	Samara single-mandate constituency	Samara Oblast	Pyotr Zolotaryov	A Just Russia	11,432	4.9
158	Samara single-mandate constituency	Samara Oblast	Nadezhda Kolesnikova	United Russia	109,435	47.1
158	Samara single-mandate constituency	Samara Oblast	Oxana Lantsova	Liberal Democratic Party	24,104	10.4
158	Samara single-mandate constituency	Samara Oblast	Mikhail Matveyev	Communist Party	49,984	21.5
158	Samara single-mandate constituency	Samara Oblast	Alexey Ofitserov	Civic Platform	2,610	1.1
158	Samara single-mandate constituency	Samara Oblast	Oleg Sabantsev	Patriots of Russia	2,642	1.1
158	Samara single-mandate constituency	Samara Oblast	Sergey Sovetkin	Yabloko	6,126	2.6
159	Tolyatti single-mandate constituency	Samara Oblast	Vladimir Bokk	United Russia	82,398	36.2
159	Tolyatti single-mandate constituency	Samara Oblast	Andrey Gavrilov	Rodina	4,997	2.2
159	Tolyatti single-mandate constituency	Samara Oblast	Vitaly Yerkaev	People's Freedom Party	3,198	1.4
159	Tolyatti single-mandate constituency	Samara Oblast	Anatoly Ivanov	Communists of Russia	9,489	4.2
159	Tolyatti single-mandate constituency	Samara Oblast	Leonid Kalashnikov	Communist Party	73,840	32.5
159	Tolyatti single-mandate constituency	Samara Oblast	Mikhail Kurbakov	Party of Growth	3,989	1.8
159	Tolyatti single-mandate constituency	Samara Oblast	Mikhail Maryakhin	A Just Russia	16,175	7.1
159	Tolyatti single-mandate constituency	Samara Oblast	Sergey Mikhaylov	Liberal Democratic Party	23,307	10.2
159	Tolyatti single-mandate constituency	Samara Oblast	Natalya Semikova	Greens	4,988	2.2
159	Tolyatti single-mandate constituency	Samara Oblast	Sergey Simak	Yabloko	5,044	2.2
160	Krasnoglinsky single-mandate constituency	Samara Oblast	Vladimir Avdonin	People's Freedom Party	4,219	1.5
160	Krasnoglinsky single-mandate constituency	Samara Oblast	Vitaly Ilyin	Civic Platform	3,778	1.4
160	Krasnoglinsky single-mandate constituency	Samara Oblast	Vladislav Ishutin	Yabloko	4,532	1.6
160	Krasnoglinsky single-mandate constituency	Samara Oblast	Viktor Kazakov	United Russia	182,780	66.1
160	Krasnoglinsky single-mandate constituency	Samara Oblast	Oxana Kovnir	Greens	3,943	1.4
160	Krasnoglinsky single-mandate constituency	Samara Oblast	Svetlana Kuzmina	Communists of Russia	14,020	5.1
160	Krasnoglinsky single-mandate constituency	Samara Oblast	Alexandra Kuzminykh	Independent	2,773	1.0
160	Krasnoglinsky single-mandate constituency	Samara Oblast	Alexey Leskin	Communist Party	23,948	8.7
160	Krasnoglinsky single-mandate constituency	Samara Oblast	Eduard Pugachev	Party of Growth	3,516	1.3
160	Krasnoglinsky single-mandate constituency	Samara Oblast	Alexander Razuvaev	A Just Russia	9,528	3.4
160	Krasnoglinsky single-mandate constituency	Samara Oblast	Roman Sinelnikov	Liberal Democratic Party	20,969	7.6
160	Krasnoglinsky single-mandate constituency	Samara Oblast	Valery Sintsov	Patriots of Russia	2,465	0.9
161	Zhigulyovsk single-mandate constituency	Samara Oblast	Andrey Yevdokimov	Party of Growth	17,926	7.2
161	Zhigulyovsk single-mandate constituency	Samara Oblast	Igor Yermolenko	Yabloko	4,682	1.9
161	Zhigulyovsk single-mandate constituency	Samara Oblast	Yuliya Ivanova	Greens	7,233	2.9
161	Zhigulyovsk single-mandate constituency	Samara Oblast	Mikhail Kapishin	Communists of Russia	13,995	5.6
161	Zhigulyovsk single-mandate constituency	Samara Oblast	Alexey Krasnov	Communist Party	29,571	11.8
161	Zhigulyovsk single-mandate constituency	Samara Oblast	Oleg Svintsov	Patriots of Russia	3,906	1.6
161	Zhigulyovsk single-mandate constituency	Samara Oblast	Yevgeny Serper	United Russia	125,805	50.3
161	Zhigulyovsk single-mandate constituency	Samara Oblast	Artyom Tonkikh	People's Freedom Party	3,431	1.4
161	Zhigulyovsk single-mandate constituency	Samara Oblast	Mikhail Usov	Liberal Democratic Party	28,456	11.4
161	Zhigulyovsk single-mandate constituency	Samara Oblast	Nikolay Shishlov	A Just Russia	14,900	6.0
162	Promyshlenny single-mandate constituency	Samara Oblast	Yury Venediktov	Liberal Democratic Party	27,472	11.7
162	Promyshlenny single-mandate constituency	Samara Oblast	Anton Guskov	Party of Growth	4,636	2.0
162	Promyshlenny single-mandate constituency	Samara Oblast	Sergey Igumenov	Communists of Russia	8,929	3.8
162	Promyshlenny single-mandate constituency	Samara Oblast	Vera Lekareva	A Just Russia	19,544	8.3
162	Promyshlenny single-mandate constituency	Samara Oblast	Vladimir Obukhov	Civic Platform	12,238	5.2
162	Promyshlenny single-mandate constituency	Samara Oblast	Yekaterina Parkhomenko	Independent	4,615	2.0
162	Promyshlenny single-mandate constituency	Samara Oblast	Anton Puntok	People's Freedom Party	2,566	1.1
162	Promyshlenny single-mandate constituency	Samara Oblast	Konstantin Ryadnov	Communist Party	33,931	14.5
162	Promyshlenny single-mandate constituency	Samara Oblast	Alexander Semerozubov	Yabloko	5,972	2.5
162	Promyshlenny single-mandate constituency	Samara Oblast	Igor Stankevich	United Russia	114,918	48.9
163	Saratov single-mandate constituency	Saratov Oblast	Alexander Anidalov	Communist Party	40,390	12.7
163	Saratov single-mandate constituency	Saratov Oblast	Oleg Grishchenko	United Russia	171,851	53.9
163	Saratov single-mandate constituency	Saratov Oblast	Anton Ishchenko	Liberal Democratic Party	34,507	10.8
163	Saratov single-mandate constituency	Saratov Oblast	Dmitry Konnychev	Yabloko	11,847	3.7
163	Saratov single-mandate constituency	Saratov Oblast	Alexander Ledkov	People's Freedom Party	4,171	1.3
163	Saratov single-mandate constituency	Saratov Oblast	Pavel Mironov	A Just Russia	24,328	7.6
163	Saratov single-mandate constituency	Saratov Oblast	Viktor Safyanov	Communists of Russia	12,938	4.1
163	Saratov single-mandate constituency	Saratov Oblast	Alexander Frolov	Greens	6,346	2.0
163	Saratov single-mandate constituency	Saratov Oblast	Dmitry Khanenko	Party of Growth	12,161	3.8
164	Balakovo single-mandate constituency	Saratov Oblast	Sergey Ashikhmin	Liberal Democratic Party	24,488	8.8
164	Balakovo single-mandate constituency	Saratov Oblast	Alexander German	Communists of Russia	9,318	3.3
164	Balakovo single-mandate constituency	Saratov Oblast	Mikhail Dementyev	A Just Russia	11,870	4.3
164	Balakovo single-mandate constituency	Saratov Oblast	Vladimir Deryabin	Party of Growth	6,020	2.2
164	Balakovo single-mandate constituency	Saratov Oblast	Alexander Yermishin	Yabloko	4,292	1.5
164	Balakovo single-mandate constituency	Saratov Oblast	Olga Lubkova	Communist Party	22,446	8.1
164	Balakovo single-mandate constituency	Saratov Oblast	Roman Maltsev	People's Freedom Party	3,755	1.3
164	Balakovo single-mandate constituency	Saratov Oblast	Nikolay Pankov	United Russia	187,489	67.2
164	Balakovo single-mandate constituency	Saratov Oblast	Maxim Smirnov	Civic Platform	1,559	0.6
164	Balakovo single-mandate constituency	Saratov Oblast	Gleb Teryokhin	Rodina	2,491	0.9
164	Balakovo single-mandate constituency	Saratov Oblast	Alisa Trishchanovich	Greens	2,052	0.7
164	Balakovo single-mandate constituency	Saratov Oblast	Nataliya Frolova	Civilian Power	3,018	1.1
165	Balashov single-mandate constituency	Saratov Oblast	Olga Alimova	Communist Party	42,839	14.3
165	Balashov single-mandate constituency	Saratov Oblast	Yuri Gavrilichev	Communists of Russia	12,448	4.1
165	Balashov single-mandate constituency	Saratov Oblast	Dmitry Ignatyev	People's Freedom Party	4,149	1.4
165	Balashov single-mandate constituency	Saratov Oblast	Mikhail Isayev	United Russia	163,931	54.5
165	Balashov single-mandate constituency	Saratov Oblast	Ilya Kozlyakov	Yabloko	5,500	1.8
165	Balashov single-mandate constituency	Saratov Oblast	Anna Kupets	Greens	4,826	1.6
165	Balashov single-mandate constituency	Saratov Oblast	Svetlana Martynova	Liberal Democratic Party	31,727	10.6
165	Balashov single-mandate constituency	Saratov Oblast	Galina Platoshina	A Just Russia	27,791	9.2
165	Balashov single-mandate constituency	Saratov Oblast	Vyacheslav Shcherbakov	Rodina	7,383	2.5
166	Engels single-mandate constituency	Saratov Oblast	Sergey Afanasyev	Communist Party	63,412	19.3
166	Engels single-mandate constituency	Saratov Oblast	Elnur Bayramov	People's Freedom Party	3,887	1.2
166	Engels single-mandate constituency	Saratov Oblast	Alexander Grishantsov	Communists of Russia	11,886	3.6
166	Engels single-mandate constituency	Saratov Oblast	Alexander Zhurbin	Yabloko	6,745	2.1
166	Engels single-mandate constituency	Saratov Oblast	Alexey Mazepov	Party of Growth	8,416	2.6
166	Engels single-mandate constituency	Saratov Oblast	Vasily Maximov	United Russia	180,194	55.0
166	Engels single-mandate constituency	Saratov Oblast	Dmitry Pyanykh	Liberal Democratic Party	27,322	8.3
166	Engels single-mandate constituency	Saratov Oblast	Toktar Sarsengaliev	A Just Russia	19,846	6.1
166	Engels single-mandate constituency	Saratov Oblast	Konstantin Frolov	Greens	6,012	1.8
167	Sakhalin single-mandate constituency	Sakhalin Oblast	Alexey Grigorenko	Rodina	4,722	3.5
167	Sakhalin single-mandate constituency	Sakhalin Oblast	Alexander Zenkin	Communists of Russia	5,616	4.2
167	Sakhalin single-mandate constituency	Sakhalin Oblast	Svetlana Vasilyeva	Communist Party	35,148	26.1
167	Sakhalin single-mandate constituency	Sakhalin Oblast	Georgy Karlov	United Russia	60,280	44.8
167	Sakhalin single-mandate constituency	Sakhalin Oblast	Veniamin Pak	Yabloko	4,801	3.6
167	Sakhalin single-mandate constituency	Sakhalin Oblast	Irina Repina	Patriots of Russia	2,838	2.1
167	Sakhalin single-mandate constituency	Sakhalin Oblast	Eduard Taran	A Just Russia	5,550	4.1
167	Sakhalin single-mandate constituency	Sakhalin Oblast	Dmitry Fleer	Liberal Democratic Party	15,458	11.5
168	Sverdlovsk single-mandate constituency	Sverdlovsk Oblast	Andrey Alshevskikh	United Russia	76,390	41.4
168	Sverdlovsk single-mandate constituency	Sverdlovsk Oblast	Denis Gaev	Greens	8,340	4.5
168	Sverdlovsk single-mandate constituency	Sverdlovsk Oblast	Sergey Zaytsev	Communists of Russia	6,023	3.3
168	Sverdlovsk single-mandate constituency	Sverdlovsk Oblast	Felix Rivkin	People's Freedom Party	8,861	4.8
168	Sverdlovsk single-mandate constituency	Sverdlovsk Oblast	Denis Sizov	Liberal Democratic Party	18,104	9.8
168	Sverdlovsk single-mandate constituency	Sverdlovsk Oblast	Rimma Skomorokhova	Communist Party	20,948	11.3
168	Sverdlovsk single-mandate constituency	Sverdlovsk Oblast	Valery Chereshnev	A Just Russia	36,863	20.0
168	Sverdlovsk single-mandate constituency	Sverdlovsk Oblast	Vladimir Shabanov	Rodina	9,208	5.0
169	Kamensk-Uralsky single-mandate constituency	Sverdlovsk Oblast	Vladimir Gerasimenko	Party of Growth	8,694	5.0
169	Kamensk-Uralsky single-mandate constituency	Sverdlovsk Oblast	Dmitry Golovin	Yabloko	8,599	5.0
169	Kamensk-Uralsky single-mandate constituency	Sverdlovsk Oblast	Yury Zlydnikov	A Just Russia	27,158	15.8
169	Kamensk-Uralsky single-mandate constituency	Sverdlovsk Oblast	Valery Ivanov	Rodina	6,816	4.0
169	Kamensk-Uralsky single-mandate constituency	Sverdlovsk Oblast	Lev Iofe	Patriots of Russia	2,736	1.6
169	Kamensk-Uralsky single-mandate constituency	Sverdlovsk Oblast	Konstantin Karashevich	Communists of Russia	7,205	4.2
169	Kamensk-Uralsky single-mandate constituency	Sverdlovsk Oblast	Lev Kovpak	United Russia	69,066	40.1
169	Kamensk-Uralsky single-mandate constituency	Sverdlovsk Oblast	Anatoly Koromyslov	People's Freedom Party	2,409	1.4
169	Kamensk-Uralsky single-mandate constituency	Sverdlovsk Oblast	Sergey Pakulov	Greens	3,773	2.2
169	Kamensk-Uralsky single-mandate constituency	Sverdlovsk Oblast	Alexey Parfyonov	Communist Party	17,331	10.1
169	Kamensk-Uralsky single-mandate constituency	Sverdlovsk Oblast	Konstantin Subbotin	Liberal Democratic Party	18,559	10.8
170	Beryozovsky single-mandate constituency	Sverdlovsk Oblast	Mikhail Borisov	People's Freedom Party	7,104	3.7
170	Beryozovsky single-mandate constituency	Sverdlovsk Oblast	Yevgeny Borovik	Communist Party	26,007	13.5
170	Beryozovsky single-mandate constituency	Sverdlovsk Oblast	Daniil Voronov	Patriots of Russia	3,220	1.7
170	Beryozovsky single-mandate constituency	Sverdlovsk Oblast	Pavel Davletshin	Liberal Democratic Party	17,935	9.3
170	Beryozovsky single-mandate constituency	Sverdlovsk Oblast	Dmitry Ionin	A Just Russia	31,288	16.2
170	Beryozovsky single-mandate constituency	Sverdlovsk Oblast	Valery Molokov	Party of Growth	7,556	3.9
170	Beryozovsky single-mandate constituency	Sverdlovsk Oblast	Igor Ruzakov	Greens	5,814	3.0
170	Beryozovsky single-mandate constituency	Sverdlovsk Oblast	Ruslan Khasyanzyanov	Communists of Russia	4,364	2.3
170	Beryozovsky single-mandate constituency	Sverdlovsk Oblast	Sergei Tchepikov	United Russia	89,675	46.5
171	Nizhny Tagil single-mandate constituency	Sverdlovsk Oblast	Dmitry Abramov	Communists of Russia	7,807	4.3
171	Nizhny Tagil single-mandate constituency	Sverdlovsk Oblast	Alexey Balyberdin	United Russia	81,111	44.5
171	Nizhny Tagil single-mandate constituency	Sverdlovsk Oblast	Mikhail Brovin	People's Freedom Party	3,017	1.7
171	Nizhny Tagil single-mandate constituency	Sverdlovsk Oblast	Alexander Burkov	A Just Russia	43,594	23.9
171	Nizhny Tagil single-mandate constituency	Sverdlovsk Oblast	Yevgeny Vasilyuk	Greens	2,572	1.4
171	Nizhny Tagil single-mandate constituency	Sverdlovsk Oblast	Sergey Lyuft	Party of Growth	3,974	2.2
171	Nizhny Tagil single-mandate constituency	Sverdlovsk Oblast	Salaudin Mamakov	Rodina	1,653	0.9
171	Nizhny Tagil single-mandate constituency	Sverdlovsk Oblast	Dmitry Panachev	Patriots of Russia	1,614	0.9
171	Nizhny Tagil single-mandate constituency	Sverdlovsk Oblast	Vladislav Potanin	Communist Party	20,323	11.1
171	Nizhny Tagil single-mandate constituency	Sverdlovsk Oblast	Ildar Rainbakov	Liberal Democratic Party	16,706	9.2
172	Asbest single-mandate constituency	Sverdlovsk Oblast	Sergey Babkin	Party of Growth	7,620	3.9
172	Asbest single-mandate constituency	Sverdlovsk Oblast	Denis Belov	Communists of Russia	15,853	8.1
172	Asbest single-mandate constituency	Sverdlovsk Oblast	Maxim Ivanov	United Russia	80,891	41.1
172	Asbest single-mandate constituency	Sverdlovsk Oblast	Yevgeny Martyshko	Patriots of Russia	3,580	1.8
172	Asbest single-mandate constituency	Sverdlovsk Oblast	Igor Toroshchin	Liberal Democratic Party	36,429	18.5
172	Asbest single-mandate constituency	Sverdlovsk Oblast	Mikhail Tuponogov	Greens	3,665	1.9
172	Asbest single-mandate constituency	Sverdlovsk Oblast	Sergey Tyurikov	Yabloko	7,425	3.8
172	Asbest single-mandate constituency	Sverdlovsk Oblast	Vladimir Filippov	A Just Russia	33,507	17.0
172	Asbest single-mandate constituency	Sverdlovsk Oblast	Dmitry Cheremisin	Rodina	7,774	4.0
173	Pervouralsk single-mandate constituency	Sverdlovsk Oblast	Anton Bezdenezhnykh	Liberal Democratic Party	22,212	11.7
173	Pervouralsk single-mandate constituency	Sverdlovsk Oblast	Nikolay Ezersky	Communist Party	25,465	13.4
173	Pervouralsk single-mandate constituency	Sverdlovsk Oblast	Igor Konakov	People's Freedom Party	3,573	1.9
173	Pervouralsk single-mandate constituency	Sverdlovsk Oblast	Zelimkhan Mutsoev	United Russia	94,290	49.6
173	Pervouralsk single-mandate constituency	Sverdlovsk Oblast	Alexey Poletaev	Communists of Russia	6,079	3.2
173	Pervouralsk single-mandate constituency	Sverdlovsk Oblast	Vladislav Punin	A Just Russia	28,685	15.1
173	Pervouralsk single-mandate constituency	Sverdlovsk Oblast	Sergey Renzhin	Party of Growth	2,817	1.5
173	Pervouralsk single-mandate constituency	Sverdlovsk Oblast	Alexander Cherkasov	Greens	3,810	2.0
173	Pervouralsk single-mandate constituency	Sverdlovsk Oblast	Sergey Yarutin	Patriots of Russia	3,189	1.7
174	Serov single-mandate constituency	Sverdlovsk Oblast	Galina Bastrygina	People's Freedom Party	6,388	3.4
174	Serov single-mandate constituency	Sverdlovsk Oblast	Sergey Bidonko	United Russia	86,944	46.3
174	Serov single-mandate constituency	Sverdlovsk Oblast	Georgy Zharkoy	Patriots of Russia	3,185	1.7
174	Serov single-mandate constituency	Sverdlovsk Oblast	Alexander Ilyin	Civic Platform	5,083	2.7
174	Serov single-mandate constituency	Sverdlovsk Oblast	Lev Mordvov	Party of Growth	3,584	1.9
174	Serov single-mandate constituency	Sverdlovsk Oblast	Sergey Semenovykh	A Just Russia	34,856	18.6
174	Serov single-mandate constituency	Sverdlovsk Oblast	Alexander Stolbov	Communist Party	24,144	12.9
174	Serov single-mandate constituency	Sverdlovsk Oblast	Daniel Shilkov	Liberal Democratic Party	21,055	11.2
174	Serov single-mandate constituency	Sverdlovsk Oblast	Maxim Shingarkin	Rodina	2,423	1.3
175	Smolensk single-mandate constituency	Smolensk Oblast	Oleg Aksyonov	Patriots of Russia	6,983	4.2
175	Smolensk single-mandate constituency	Smolensk Oblast	Mikhail Atroshchenkov	A Just Russia	7,855	4.7
175	Smolensk single-mandate constituency	Smolensk Oblast	Alexander Gerasenkov	Liberal Democratic Party	23,123	13.8
175	Smolensk single-mandate constituency	Smolensk Oblast	Yevgeni Dorosevich	Greens	2,196	1.3
175	Smolensk single-mandate constituency	Smolensk Oblast	Sergey Neverov	United Russia	98,039	58.4
175	Smolensk single-mandate constituency	Smolensk Oblast	Oleg Petrikov	Rodina	2,573	1.5
175	Smolensk single-mandate constituency	Smolensk Oblast	Yuri Poskannoy	Yabloko	1,761	1.0
175	Smolensk single-mandate constituency	Smolensk Oblast	Alexander Stepchenkov	Communist Party	20,126	12.0
175	Smolensk single-mandate constituency	Smolensk Oblast	Vladimir Stefantsov	Communists of Russia	3,571	2.1
175	Smolensk single-mandate constituency	Smolensk Oblast	Roman Shisterov	Party of Growth	1,587	0.9
176	Roslavl single-mandate constituency	Smolensk Oblast	Sergey Alkhimov	Patriots of Russia	3,178	2.2
176	Roslavl single-mandate constituency	Smolensk Oblast	Artyom Kraynov	Greens	1,497	1.1
176	Roslavl single-mandate constituency	Smolensk Oblast	Sergey Lebedev	A Just Russia	12,282	8.7
176	Roslavl single-mandate constituency	Smolensk Oblast	Sergey Leonov	Liberal Democratic Party	21,081	14.9
176	Roslavl single-mandate constituency	Smolensk Oblast	Andrey Mitrofanenkov	Communist Party	25,912	18.3
176	Roslavl single-mandate constituency	Smolensk Oblast	Olga Okuneva	United Russia	67,300	47.6
176	Roslavl single-mandate constituency	Smolensk Oblast	Alexey Protasov	Communists of Russia	2,958	2.1
176	Roslavl single-mandate constituency	Smolensk Oblast	Sergey Revenko	Yabloko	3,105	2.2
176	Roslavl single-mandate constituency	Smolensk Oblast	Dmitry Savchenkov	Rodina	2,499	1.8
176	Roslavl single-mandate constituency	Smolensk Oblast	Pavel Yukhimenko	Party of Growth	1,630	1.2
177	Tambov single-mandate constituency	Tambov Oblast	Anatoly Artyomov	Rodina	15,744	7.5
177	Tambov single-mandate constituency	Tambov Oblast	Olga Grekova	Patriots of Russia	2,095	1.0
177	Tambov single-mandate constituency	Tambov Oblast	Andrey Zhidkov	Communist Party	22,282	10.6
177	Tambov single-mandate constituency	Tambov Oblast	Vasily Kopyev	Communists of Russia	5,872	2.8
177	Tambov single-mandate constituency	Tambov Oblast	Irina Misanova	Party of Growth	2,803	1.3
177	Tambov single-mandate constituency	Tambov Oblast	Sergey Panfilov	Greens	2,990	1.4
177	Tambov single-mandate constituency	Tambov Oblast	Alexander Polyakov	United Russia	132,323	62.9
177	Tambov single-mandate constituency	Tambov Oblast	Irina Popova	A Just Russia	14,377	6.8
177	Tambov single-mandate constituency	Tambov Oblast	Konstantin Susakov	Liberal Democratic Party	11,984	5.7
178	Rasskazovo single-mandate constituency	Tambov Oblast	Artyom Aleksandrov	Communist Party	19,001	9.7
178	Rasskazovo single-mandate constituency	Tambov Oblast	Alexander Zhupikov	United Russia	112,869	57.4
178	Rasskazovo single-mandate constituency	Tambov Oblast	Viktor Pashinin	A Just Russia	8,559	4.4
178	Rasskazovo single-mandate constituency	Tambov Oblast	Gulnur Potankina	Communists of Russia	6,248	3.2
178	Rasskazovo single-mandate constituency	Tambov Oblast	Artyom Spirin	Civilian Power	1,213	0.6
178	Rasskazovo single-mandate constituency	Tambov Oblast	Igor Telegin	Liberal Democratic Party	11,711	6.0
178	Rasskazovo single-mandate constituency	Tambov Oblast	Roman Khudyakov	Rodina	37,112	18.9
179	Tver single-mandate constituency	Tver Oblast	Igor Alekseev	Yabloko	9,509	4.7
179	Tver single-mandate constituency	Tver Oblast	Lyudmila Vorobyova	Communist Party	26,304	13.0
179	Tver single-mandate constituency	Tver Oblast	Vadim Deshyovkin	Rodina	14,168	7.0
179	Tver single-mandate constituency	Tver Oblast	Ilya Kleymenov	Communists of Russia	10,381	5.1
179	Tver single-mandate constituency	Tver Oblast	Svetlana Maximova	United Russia	74,514	36.9
179	Tver single-mandate constituency	Tver Oblast	Anton Morozov	Liberal Democratic Party	28,965	14.3
179	Tver single-mandate constituency	Tver Oblast	Alexey Chepa	A Just Russia	38,080	18.9
180	Zavolzhsky single-mandate constituency	Tver Oblast	Vladimir Barastov	Liberal Democratic Party	25,594	11.2
180	Zavolzhsky single-mandate constituency	Tver Oblast	Marina Belova	People's Freedom Party	10,650	4.6
180	Zavolzhsky single-mandate constituency	Tver Oblast	Vladimir Vasilyev	United Russia	125,812	54.9
180	Zavolzhsky single-mandate constituency	Tver Oblast	Artyom Goncharov	Communist Party	34,052	14.8
180	Zavolzhsky single-mandate constituency	Tver Oblast	Timur Kanokov	A Just Russia	15,254	6.7
180	Zavolzhsky single-mandate constituency	Tver Oblast	Roman Komarnitsky	Civic Platform	1,755	0.8
180	Zavolzhsky single-mandate constituency	Tver Oblast	Dmitry Slitinsky	Communists of Russia	6,813	3.0
180	Zavolzhsky single-mandate constituency	Tver Oblast	Alexander Sorokin	Yabloko	7,314	3.2
180	Zavolzhsky single-mandate constituency	Tver Oblast	Vadim Shklyar	Civilian Power	2,068	0.9
181	Tomsk single-mandate constituency	Tomsk Oblast	Yegor Belyanko	Party of Growth	5,680	4.6
181	Tomsk single-mandate constituency	Tomsk Oblast	Andrey Volkov	Communists of Russia	9,789	8.0
181	Tomsk single-mandate constituency	Tomsk Oblast	Alexey Didenko	Liberal Democratic Party	45,583	37.1
181	Tomsk single-mandate constituency	Tomsk Oblast	Vasily Yeryomin	Yabloko	8,528	6.9
181	Tomsk single-mandate constituency	Tomsk Oblast	Sergey Zhabin	Greens	6,043	4.9
181	Tomsk single-mandate constituency	Tomsk Oblast	Yevgeny Krotov	Patriots of Russia	3,822	3.1
181	Tomsk single-mandate constituency	Tomsk Oblast	Alexander Rostovtsev	A Just Russia	23,058	18.8
181	Tomsk single-mandate constituency	Tomsk Oblast	Alexey Fyodorov	Communist Party	20,469	16.6
182	Ob single-mandate constituency	Tomsk Oblast	Natalya Baryshnikova	Communist Party	18,102	14.7
182	Ob single-mandate constituency	Tomsk Oblast	Sergey Bryansky	Liberal Democratic Party	17,035	13.8
182	Ob single-mandate constituency	Tomsk Oblast	Mikhail Larin	Patriots of Russia	4,379	3.6
182	Ob single-mandate constituency	Tomsk Oblast	Maxim Luchshev	Party of Growth	3,373	2.7
182	Ob single-mandate constituency	Tomsk Oblast	Galina Nemtseva	A Just Russia	16,594	13.5
182	Ob single-mandate constituency	Tomsk Oblast	Tatyana Solomatina	United Russia	55,341	45.0
182	Ob single-mandate constituency	Tomsk Oblast	Pyotr Chernogrivov	Greens	3,685	3.0
182	Ob single-mandate constituency	Tomsk Oblast	Vasily Shipilov	Communists of Russia	4,570	3.7
183	Tula single-mandate constituency	Tula Oblast	Yelizaveta Batishcheva	Party of Growth	5,160	1.9
183	Tula single-mandate constituency	Tula Oblast	Vladimir Godunov	Rodina	5,219	2.0
183	Tula single-mandate constituency	Tula Oblast	Viktor Dzyuba	United Russia	167,708	63.1
183	Tula single-mandate constituency	Tula Oblast	Vladimir Dorokhov	Yabloko	6,465	2.4
183	Tula single-mandate constituency	Tula Oblast	Ilya Kindeev	Liberal Democratic Party	20,563	7.7
183	Tula single-mandate constituency	Tula Oblast	German Konev	People's Freedom Party	3,483	1.3
183	Tula single-mandate constituency	Tula Oblast	Tatyana Kosareva	Communist Party	30,860	11.6
183	Tula single-mandate constituency	Tula Oblast	Anatoly Kuzhetsov	A Just Russia	14,610	5.5
183	Tula single-mandate constituency	Tula Oblast	Yelena Safonova	Greens	5,037	1.9
183	Tula single-mandate constituency	Tula Oblast	Oleg Sakharov	Communists of Russia	6,777	2.5
184	Novomoskovsk single-mandate constituency	Tula Oblast	Ildar Abdulganiev	Communists of Russia	7,767	3.0
184	Novomoskovsk single-mandate constituency	Tula Oblast	Vladimir Afonsky	United Russia	139,658	53.7
184	Novomoskovsk single-mandate constituency	Tula Oblast	Alexander Balberov	Liberal Democratic Party	25,799	9.9
184	Novomoskovsk single-mandate constituency	Tula Oblast	Sergey Grebenshchikov	A Just Russia	17,740	6.8
184	Novomoskovsk single-mandate constituency	Tula Oblast	Roman Yefremov	People's Freedom Party	4,721	1.8
184	Novomoskovsk single-mandate constituency	Tula Oblast	Anastasiya Zhukova	Party of Growth	6,746	2.6
184	Novomoskovsk single-mandate constituency	Tula Oblast	Yelena Konovalova	Yabloko	5,984	2.3
184	Novomoskovsk single-mandate constituency	Tula Oblast	Oleg Lebedev	Communist Party	40,754	15.6
184	Novomoskovsk single-mandate constituency	Tula Oblast	Alexey Novgorodov	Rodina	7,721	3.0
184	Novomoskovsk single-mandate constituency	Tula Oblast	Mikhail Seregin	Greens	3,373	1.3
185	Tyumen single-mandate constituency	Tyumen Oblast	Marat Bikmulin	Party of Growth	9,445	2.2
185	Tyumen single-mandate constituency	Tyumen Oblast	Ernest Valeev	United Russia	244,634	57.6
185	Tyumen single-mandate constituency	Tyumen Oblast	Pavel Dorokhin	Communist Party	36,182	8.5
185	Tyumen single-mandate constituency	Tyumen Oblast	Nikolay Komoltsev	Civilian Power	6,891	1.6
185	Tyumen single-mandate constituency	Tyumen Oblast	Sergey Morev	A Just Russia	38,997	9.2
185	Tyumen single-mandate constituency	Tyumen Oblast	Aleksandr Nevzorov	Patriots of Russia	7,195	1.7
185	Tyumen single-mandate constituency	Tyumen Oblast	Aleksandr Novosyolov	Rodina	9,410	2.2
185	Tyumen single-mandate constituency	Tyumen Oblast	Yevgeniya Safiyeva	Communists of Russia	12,624	3.0
185	Tyumen single-mandate constituency	Tyumen Oblast	Anzhela Semyonova	Yabloko	8,140	1.9
185	Tyumen single-mandate constituency	Tyumen Oblast	Gleb Trubin	Liberal Democratic Party	37,603	8.9
185	Tyumen single-mandate constituency	Tyumen Oblast	Alexander Chekmaryov	People's Freedom Party	5,687	1.3
185	Tyumen single-mandate constituency	Tyumen Oblast	Valery Shchukin	Greens	7,553	1.8
186	Zavodoukovsk single-mandate constituency	Tyumen Oblast	Andrey Agarkov	Greens	9,875	2.3
186	Zavodoukovsk single-mandate constituency	Tyumen Oblast	Alexey Yergaliev	Party of Growth	7,931	1.8
186	Zavodoukovsk single-mandate constituency	Tyumen Oblast	Artyom Zaytsev	Liberal Democratic Party	47,242	10.8
186	Zavodoukovsk single-mandate constituency	Tyumen Oblast	Ivan Kvitka	United Russia	243,402	55.7
186	Zavodoukovsk single-mandate constituency	Tyumen Oblast	Dmitry Kirillov	Yabloko	10,074	2.3
186	Zavodoukovsk single-mandate constituency	Tyumen Oblast	Alexander Kunilovsky	People's Freedom Party	6,897	1.6
186	Zavodoukovsk single-mandate constituency	Tyumen Oblast	Nataliya Nesterova	Communists of Russia	19,702	4.5
186	Zavodoukovsk single-mandate constituency	Tyumen Oblast	Alexander Chepik	Communist Party	32,050	7.3
186	Zavodoukovsk single-mandate constituency	Tyumen Oblast	Vladimir Sharpatov	A Just Russia	60,029	13.7
187	Ulyanovsk single-mandate constituency	Ulyanovsk Oblast	Vladimir Basenkov	Rodina	2,659	1.2
187	Ulyanovsk single-mandate constituency	Ulyanovsk Oblast	Eduard Gebel	People's Freedom Party	2,314	1.0
187	Ulyanovsk single-mandate constituency	Ulyanovsk Oblast	Oleg Goryachev	Yabloko	15,997	7.2
187	Ulyanovsk single-mandate constituency	Ulyanovsk Oblast	Nikolay Klyushenkov	Party of Growth	4,084	1.8
187	Ulyanovsk single-mandate constituency	Ulyanovsk Oblast	Alexey Kulakov	A Just Russia	8,372	3.7
187	Ulyanovsk single-mandate constituency	Ulyanovsk Oblast	Alexey Kurinny	Communist Party	82,025	36.7
187	Ulyanovsk single-mandate constituency	Ulyanovsk Oblast	Sergey Marinin	Liberal Democratic Party	21,212	9.5
187	Ulyanovsk single-mandate constituency	Ulyanovsk Oblast	Sergey Pronin	Patriots of Russia	5,412	2.4
187	Ulyanovsk single-mandate constituency	Ulyanovsk Oblast	Igor Tikhonov	United Russia	81,293	36.4
188	Radishchevo single-mandate constituency	Ulyanovsk Oblast	Alexey Arkhipov	A Just Russia	10,476	3.7
188	Radishchevo single-mandate constituency	Ulyanovsk Oblast	Alexander Bragin	People's Freedom Party	4,194	1.5
188	Radishchevo single-mandate constituency	Ulyanovsk Oblast	Dmitry Grachyov	Liberal Democratic Party	28,816	10.1
188	Radishchevo single-mandate constituency	Ulyanovsk Oblast	Ruslan Ilyasov	Party of Growth	6,944	2.4
188	Radishchevo single-mandate constituency	Ulyanovsk Oblast	Nikolay Kislitsa	Yabloko	3,110	1.1
188	Radishchevo single-mandate constituency	Ulyanovsk Oblast	Yury Sinelshchikov	Communist Party	39,686	13.9
188	Radishchevo single-mandate constituency	Ulyanovsk Oblast	Vladislav Tretiak	United Russia	192,859	67.4
189	Chelyabinsk single-mandate constituency	Chelyabinsk Oblast	Gamil Asatullin	People's Freedom Party	4,854	2.1
189	Chelyabinsk single-mandate constituency	Chelyabinsk Oblast	Andrey Baryshev	United Russia	96,109	41.2
189	Chelyabinsk single-mandate constituency	Chelyabinsk Oblast	Guzeliya Voloshina	A Just Russia	49,017	21.0
189	Chelyabinsk single-mandate constituency	Chelyabinsk Oblast	Eldar Gilmutdinov	Communist Party	27,983	12.0
189	Chelyabinsk single-mandate constituency	Chelyabinsk Oblast	Alexey Kungurtsev	Civilian Power	2,452	1.1
189	Chelyabinsk single-mandate constituency	Chelyabinsk Oblast	Ramil Mukhametshin	Civic Platform	2,498	1.1
189	Chelyabinsk single-mandate constituency	Chelyabinsk Oblast	Alexey Neuymin	Greens	6,175	2.6
189	Chelyabinsk single-mandate constituency	Chelyabinsk Oblast	Mikhail Razzhivin	Patriots of Russia	4,287	1.8
189	Chelyabinsk single-mandate constituency	Chelyabinsk Oblast	Andrey Talevlin	Yabloko	10,048	4.3
189	Chelyabinsk single-mandate constituency	Chelyabinsk Oblast	Yekaterina Fedotova	Liberal Democratic Party	29,660	12.7
190	Metallurgichesky single-mandate constituency	Chelyabinsk Oblast	Vladimir Burmatov	United Russia	87,649	43.6
190	Metallurgichesky single-mandate constituency	Chelyabinsk Oblast	Vladimir Gorbachyov	Communists of Russia	8,854	4.4
190	Metallurgichesky single-mandate constituency	Chelyabinsk Oblast	Yelena Navrotskaya	Patriots of Russia	4,402	2.2
190	Metallurgichesky single-mandate constituency	Chelyabinsk Oblast	Konstantin Natsievsky	Communist Party	15,439	7.7
190	Metallurgichesky single-mandate constituency	Chelyabinsk Oblast	Vitaly Pashin	Liberal Democratic Party	21,284	10.6
190	Metallurgichesky single-mandate constituency	Chelyabinsk Oblast	Alexey Sevastyanov	Yabloko	15,043	7.5
190	Metallurgichesky single-mandate constituency	Chelyabinsk Oblast	Alexey Tabalov	People's Freedom Party	2,632	1.3
190	Metallurgichesky single-mandate constituency	Chelyabinsk Oblast	Vasily Shvetsov	A Just Russia	41,426	20.6
190	Metallurgichesky single-mandate constituency	Chelyabinsk Oblast	Andrey Yatsun	Rodina	4,374	2.2
191	Korkino single-mandate constituency	Chelyabinsk Oblast	Valery Gartung	A Just Russia	81,997	35.8
191	Korkino single-mandate constituency	Chelyabinsk Oblast	Dmitry Gorbachyov	Party of Growth	3,113	1.4
191	Korkino single-mandate constituency	Chelyabinsk Oblast	Konstantin Gritsenko	Patriots of Russia	1,881	0.8
191	Korkino single-mandate constituency	Chelyabinsk Oblast	Anatoly Litovchenko	United Russia	89,652	39.1
191	Korkino single-mandate constituency	Chelyabinsk Oblast	Valeriya Prikhodkina	People's Freedom Party	4,582	2.0
191	Korkino single-mandate constituency	Chelyabinsk Oblast	Andrey Samokhvalov	Liberal Democratic Party	17,928	7.8
191	Korkino single-mandate constituency	Chelyabinsk Oblast	Sergey Shargunov	Communist Party	18,754	8.2
191	Korkino single-mandate constituency	Chelyabinsk Oblast	Yaroslav Shcherbakov	Yabloko	4,581	2.0
191	Korkino single-mandate constituency	Chelyabinsk Oblast	Nikolay Yarovoy	Communists of Russia	6,571	2.9
192	Magnitogorsk single-mandate constituency	Chelyabinsk Oblast	Vitaly Bakhmetyev	United Russia	123,851	51.2
192	Magnitogorsk single-mandate constituency	Chelyabinsk Oblast	Alexey Garaev	Party of Growth	12,393	5.1
192	Magnitogorsk single-mandate constituency	Chelyabinsk Oblast	Nikolay Drozdov	Communists of Russia	10,196	4.2
192	Magnitogorsk single-mandate constituency	Chelyabinsk Oblast	Igor Yegorov	Communist Party	18,403	7.6
192	Magnitogorsk single-mandate constituency	Chelyabinsk Oblast	Olga Korda	Rodina	11,032	4.6
192	Magnitogorsk single-mandate constituency	Chelyabinsk Oblast	Olga Mukhometyarova	A Just Russia	37,540	15.5
192	Magnitogorsk single-mandate constituency	Chelyabinsk Oblast	Nikolay Fyodorov	Liberal Democratic Party	24,567	10.2
192	Magnitogorsk single-mandate constituency	Chelyabinsk Oblast	Sergey Shichkov	Yabloko	3,811	1.6
193	Zlatoust single-mandate constituency	Chelyabinsk Oblast	Sergey Vaynshteyn	Liberal Democratic Party	59,983	26.6
193	Zlatoust single-mandate constituency	Chelyabinsk Oblast	Yury Gumenyuk	Rodina	3,339	1.5
193	Zlatoust single-mandate constituency	Chelyabinsk Oblast	Oleg Kolesnikov	United Russia	77,470	34.3
193	Zlatoust single-mandate constituency	Chelyabinsk Oblast	Vasily Koshmar	Patriots of Russia	4,312	1.9
193	Zlatoust single-mandate constituency	Chelyabinsk Oblast	Ivan Nikitchuk	Communist Party	26,733	11.8
193	Zlatoust single-mandate constituency	Chelyabinsk Oblast	Nikolay Pankratov	A Just Russia	28,349	12.6
193	Zlatoust single-mandate constituency	Chelyabinsk Oblast	Vasily Potapov	People's Freedom Party	3,544	1.6
193	Zlatoust single-mandate constituency	Chelyabinsk Oblast	Natalya Tavrina	Yabloko	6,524	2.9
193	Zlatoust single-mandate constituency	Chelyabinsk Oblast	Valikhan Turgumbaev	Party of Growth	15,343	6.8
194	Yaroslavl single-mandate constituency	Yaroslavl Oblast	Sergey Agafonov	Communists of Russia	3,531	1.9
194	Yaroslavl single-mandate constituency	Yaroslavl Oblast	Anton Artemyev	Party of Growth	2,895	1.5
194	Yaroslavl single-mandate constituency	Yaroslavl Oblast	Sergey Balabaev	A Just Russia	29,240	15.4
194	Yaroslavl single-mandate constituency	Yaroslavl Oblast	Alexander Vorobyov	Communist Party	34,752	18.3
194	Yaroslavl single-mandate constituency	Yaroslavl Oblast	Andrey Vorobyov	Rodina	8,605	4.5
194	Yaroslavl single-mandate constituency	Yaroslavl Oblast	Alexander Gribov	United Russia	75,607	39.9
194	Yaroslavl single-mandate constituency	Yaroslavl Oblast	Vladimir Zubkov	Yabloko	6,414	3.4
194	Yaroslavl single-mandate constituency	Yaroslavl Oblast	Andrey Potapov	Liberal Democratic Party	19,039	10.0
194	Yaroslavl single-mandate constituency	Yaroslavl Oblast	Ivan Sinitsyn	Patriots of Russia	2,639	1.4
194	Yaroslavl single-mandate constituency	Yaroslavl Oblast	Roman Fomichev	Greens	3,339	1.8
194	Yaroslavl single-mandate constituency	Yaroslavl Oblast	Yaroslav Yudin	People's Freedom Party	3,655	1.9
195	Rostov single-mandate constituency	Yaroslavl Oblast	Anatoly Greshnevikov	A Just Russia	79,354	44.2
195	Rostov single-mandate constituency	Yaroslavl Oblast	Vladimir Denisov	Rodina	22,722	12.7
195	Rostov single-mandate constituency	Yaroslavl Oblast	Konstantin Kurchenkov	Greens	12,608	7.0
195	Rostov single-mandate constituency	Yaroslavl Oblast	Boris Loginov	Yabloko	7,315	4.1
195	Rostov single-mandate constituency	Yaroslavl Oblast	Mikhail Paramonov	Communist Party	21,592	12.0
195	Rostov single-mandate constituency	Yaroslavl Oblast	Alexey Povasin	Patriots of Russia	4,390	2.4
195	Rostov single-mandate constituency	Yaroslavl Oblast	Stanislav Smirnov	Communists of Russia	5,905	3.3
195	Rostov single-mandate constituency	Yaroslavl Oblast	Yevgeny Tarlo	Party of Growth	5,968	3.3
195	Rostov single-mandate constituency	Yaroslavl Oblast	Ilya Chikhalov	Liberal Democratic Party	19,518	10.9
196	Babushkinsky single-mandate constituency	Moscow	Oleg Belyaev	A Just Russia	13,182	8.0
196	Babushkinsky single-mandate constituency	Moscow	Yuri Gubanov	Communists of Russia	4,959	3.0
196	Babushkinsky single-mandate constituency	Moscow	Marina Drumova	Greens	7,472	4.5
196	Babushkinsky single-mandate constituency	Moscow	Vladimir Lakeyev	Independent	2,450	1.5
196	Babushkinsky single-mandate constituency	Moscow	Nikolay Lyaskin	People's Freedom Party	13,251	8.1
196	Babushkinsky single-mandate constituency	Moscow	Sergey Mitrokhin	Yabloko	20,997	12.8
196	Babushkinsky single-mandate constituency	Moscow	Alexander Potapov	Communist Party	20,348	12.4
196	Babushkinsky single-mandate constituency	Moscow	Alexander Sapronov	Liberal Democratic Party	12,441	7.6
196	Babushkinsky single-mandate constituency	Moscow	Nikolay Skorik	Patriots of Russia	2,334	1.4
196	Babushkinsky single-mandate constituency	Moscow	Ivan Teterin	United Russia	58,902	35.9
196	Babushkinsky single-mandate constituency	Moscow	Oleg Cherdakov	Civilian Power	1,180	0.7
196	Babushkinsky single-mandate constituency	Moscow	Yanis Yuksha	Rodina	6,729	4.1
197	Kuntsevo single-mandate constituency	Moscow	Natalia Eliseyeva	Civilian Power	5,853	3.8
197	Kuntsevo single-mandate constituency	Moscow	Oleg Kazenkov	A Just Russia	12,486	8.1
197	Kuntsevo single-mandate constituency	Moscow	Yevgeni Kolesov	Rodina	13,220	8.6
197	Kuntsevo single-mandate constituency	Moscow	Vadim Lukashevich	People's Freedom Party	5,427	3.5
197	Kuntsevo single-mandate constituency	Moscow	Vyacheslav Lysakov	United Russia	47,766	31.0
197	Kuntsevo single-mandate constituency	Moscow	Tatyana Mineyeva	Party of Growth	8,676	5.6
197	Kuntsevo single-mandate constituency	Moscow	Yuliya Mikhailova	Communist Party	25,184	16.3
197	Kuntsevo single-mandate constituency	Moscow	Igor Nikolayev	Yabloko	21,229	13.8
197	Kuntsevo single-mandate constituency	Moscow	Yaroslav Nilov	Liberal Democratic Party	14,283	9.3
198	Leningradsky single-mandate constituency	Moscow	Vasily Vlasov	Liberal Democratic Party	20,306	12.6
198	Leningradsky single-mandate constituency	Moscow	Yulia Galyamina	Yabloko	23,684	14.7
198	Leningradsky single-mandate constituency	Moscow	Alexander Guskov	Civilian Power	2,464	1.5
198	Leningradsky single-mandate constituency	Moscow	Valeri Kalachev	Rodina	10,214	6.3
198	Leningradsky single-mandate constituency	Moscow	Vyacheslav Makarov	People's Freedom Party	5,468	3.4
198	Leningradsky single-mandate constituency	Moscow	Andrey Nechaev	Party of Growth	9,628	6.0
198	Leningradsky single-mandate constituency	Moscow	Fyodor Obyedkov	Greens	4,350	2.7
198	Leningradsky single-mandate constituency	Moscow	Ivan Onishchenko	Patriots of Russia	5,981	3.7
198	Leningradsky single-mandate constituency	Moscow	Anton Tarasov	Communist Party	20,134	12.5
198	Leningradsky single-mandate constituency	Moscow	Galina Khovanskaya	A Just Russia	52,623	32.6
198	Leningradsky single-mandate constituency	Moscow	Vitali Shunkov	Communists of Russia	4,315	2.7
198	Leningradsky single-mandate constituency	Moscow	Yury Yurchenko	Civic Platform	1,839	1.1
199	Lyublino single-mandate constituency	Moscow	Fyodor Biryukov	Rodina	5,697	3.5
199	Lyublino single-mandate constituency	Moscow	Mikhail Dolmatov	Party of Growth	4,041	2.5
199	Lyublino single-mandate constituency	Moscow	Valery Katkov	A Just Russia	11,436	7.0
199	Lyublino single-mandate constituency	Moscow	Alexander Kachanov	Civic Platform	1,772	1.1
199	Lyublino single-mandate constituency	Moscow	Dmitri Kachanovsky	People's Freedom Party	4,428	2.7
199	Lyublino single-mandate constituency	Moscow	Sergey Kozadaev	Liberal Democratic Party	12,052	7.4
199	Lyublino single-mandate constituency	Moscow	Mikhail Kozulin	Civilian Power	613	0.4
199	Lyublino single-mandate constituency	Moscow	Aleksandr Kuvayev	Communists of Russia	4,343	2.7
199	Lyublino single-mandate constituency	Moscow	Vladimir Markin	Patriots of Russia	5,946	3.7
199	Lyublino single-mandate constituency	Moscow	Valery Rashkin	Communist Party	20,979	12.9
199	Lyublino single-mandate constituency	Moscow	Vladimir Semago	Yabloko	8,892	5.5
199	Lyublino single-mandate constituency	Moscow	Pyotr Tolstoy	United Russia	82,346	50.7
200	Medvedkovo single-mandate constituency	Moscow	Andrey Babushkin	Yabloko	20,831	14.7
200	Medvedkovo single-mandate constituency	Moscow	Vyacheslav Blinov	Communists of Russia	8,327	5.9
200	Medvedkovo single-mandate constituency	Moscow	Kristina Grigorovich	Civic Platform	2,388	1.7
200	Medvedkovo single-mandate constituency	Moscow	Sergey Dobrynin	Liberal Democratic Party	23,842	16.9
200	Medvedkovo single-mandate constituency	Moscow	Aleksey Zhuravlyov	Patriots of Russia	5,280	3.7
200	Medvedkovo single-mandate constituency	Moscow	Dmitry Marinichev	Party of Growth	7,501	5.3
200	Medvedkovo single-mandate constituency	Moscow	Oleg Mitvol	Greens	19,776	14.0
200	Medvedkovo single-mandate constituency	Moscow	Denis Parfyonov	Communist Party	28,611	20.2
200	Medvedkovo single-mandate constituency	Moscow	Yuliya Rublyova	A Just Russia	17,463	12.4
200	Medvedkovo single-mandate constituency	Moscow	Fyodor Trakhanov	Civilian Power	7,282	5.2
201	Nagatinsky single-mandate constituency	Moscow	Kirill Goncharov	Yabloko	19,390	11.4
201	Nagatinsky single-mandate constituency	Moscow	Iosif Dzhagaev	Party of Growth	3,887	2.3
201	Nagatinsky single-mandate constituency	Moscow	Yulia Zhandarova	Greens	7,534	4.4
201	Nagatinsky single-mandate constituency	Moscow	Natalya Mikhalchenko	People's Freedom Party	7,812	4.6
201	Nagatinsky single-mandate constituency	Moscow	Andrey Nagibin	A Just Russia	10,058	5.9
201	Nagatinsky single-mandate constituency	Moscow	Dmitry Nikolayev	Liberal Democratic Party	14,262	8.4
201	Nagatinsky single-mandate constituency	Moscow	Yelena Panina	United Russia	70,518	41.5
201	Nagatinsky single-mandate constituency	Moscow	Vladimir Svyatoshenko	Communist Party	18,226	10.7
201	Nagatinsky single-mandate constituency	Moscow	Valery Smirnov	Patriots of Russia	6,804	4.0
201	Nagatinsky single-mandate constituency	Moscow	Vladimir Strukov	Communists of Russia	4,393	2.6
201	Nagatinsky single-mandate constituency	Moscow	Georgi Fyodorov	Rodina	6,866	4.0
202	New Moscow single-mandate constituency	Moscow	Aleksandra Astavina	Greens	8,640	4.8
202	New Moscow single-mandate constituency	Moscow	Oleg Beznisko	People's Freedom Party	6,082	3.4
202	New Moscow single-mandate constituency	Moscow	Olga Kosets	Civic Platform	2,733	1.5
202	New Moscow single-mandate constituency	Moscow	Dmitry Kravchenko	Communists of Russia	8,888	4.9
202	New Moscow single-mandate constituency	Moscow	Andrey Rudkovsky	Liberal Democratic Party	15,845	8.8
202	New Moscow single-mandate constituency	Moscow	Dmitry Sablin	United Russia	86,875	48.2
202	New Moscow single-mandate constituency	Moscow	Igor Sagenbayev	Communist Party	19,075	10.6
202	New Moscow single-mandate constituency	Moscow	Alina Salnikova	Yabloko	9,876	5.5
202	New Moscow single-mandate constituency	Moscow	Viktor Sidnev	Party of Growth	15,643	8.7
202	New Moscow single-mandate constituency	Moscow	Igor Skurlatov	Patriots of Russia	3,083	1.7
202	New Moscow single-mandate constituency	Moscow	Anatoli Chuprina	Civilian Power	3,533	2.0
203	Orekhovo–Borisovo single-mandate constituency	Moscow	Alexander Abramovich	Communists of Russia	5,394	3.3
203	Orekhovo–Borisovo single-mandate constituency	Moscow	Igor Drandin	Yabloko	10,606	6.4
203	Orekhovo–Borisovo single-mandate constituency	Moscow	Lyubov Dukhanina	United Russia	71,537	43.4
203	Orekhovo–Borisovo single-mandate constituency	Moscow	Sergey Yerokhov	People's Freedom Party	5,358	3.3
203	Orekhovo–Borisovo single-mandate constituency	Moscow	Alexander Medvedev	Communist Party	25,036	15.2
203	Orekhovo–Borisovo single-mandate constituency	Moscow	Yulia Misevich	Greens	7,028	4.3
203	Orekhovo–Borisovo single-mandate constituency	Moscow	Anatoly Polyakov	Patriots of Russia	4,917	3.0
203	Orekhovo–Borisovo single-mandate constituency	Moscow	Dariya Sorokina	A Just Russia	13,495	8.2
203	Orekhovo–Borisovo single-mandate constituency	Moscow	Ibragim Khudayberdiyev	Rodina	2,437	1.5
203	Orekhovo–Borisovo single-mandate constituency	Moscow	Boris Chernyshov	Liberal Democratic Party	15,005	9.1
203	Orekhovo–Borisovo single-mandate constituency	Moscow	Rakhman Shakh Yansukov	Party of Growth	3,839	2.3
204	Perovo single-mandate constituency	Moscow	Yelena Badak	Party of Growth	5,122	3.1
204	Perovo single-mandate constituency	Moscow	Alexey Balabutkin	Communists of Russia	5,866	3.6
204	Perovo single-mandate constituency	Moscow	Igor Boyko	Liberal Democratic Party	15,224	9.3
204	Perovo single-mandate constituency	Moscow	Igor Yerin	Patriots of Russia	4,059	2.5
204	Perovo single-mandate constituency	Moscow	Sergei Zheleznyak	United Russia	74,854	45.7
204	Perovo single-mandate constituency	Moscow	Vladimir Zalishchak	People's Freedom Party	4,740	2.9
204	Perovo single-mandate constituency	Moscow	Dmitri Kasmin	Rodina	3,695	2.3
204	Perovo single-mandate constituency	Moscow	Alexander Korsunov	A Just Russia	8,252	5.0
204	Perovo single-mandate constituency	Moscow	Maxim Kruglov	Yabloko	12,463	7.6
204	Perovo single-mandate constituency	Moscow	Olga Lukhtan	Greens	7,995	4.9
204	Perovo single-mandate constituency	Moscow	Alexander Timchenko	Communist Party	19,225	11.7
204	Perovo single-mandate constituency	Moscow	Maxim Shemyakin	Civilian Power	2,213	1.4
205	Preobrazhensky single-mandate constituency	Moscow	Yelena Barsukova	Greens	6,311	3.9
205	Preobrazhensky single-mandate constituency	Moscow	Arseny Belenky	Party of Growth	5,363	3.3
205	Preobrazhensky single-mandate constituency	Moscow	Konstantin Bely	Rodina	3,378	2.1
205	Preobrazhensky single-mandate constituency	Moscow	Anatoly Wasserman	A Just Russia	32,379	19.9
205	Preobrazhensky single-mandate constituency	Moscow	Olga Demicheva	Yabloko	16,708	10.3
205	Preobrazhensky single-mandate constituency	Moscow	Anton Zharkov	United Russia	56,431	34.8
205	Preobrazhensky single-mandate constituency	Moscow	Andrey Kireev	Liberal Democratic Party	13,458	8.3
205	Preobrazhensky single-mandate constituency	Moscow	Ivan Kononov	Civic Platform	1,155	0.7
205	Preobrazhensky single-mandate constituency	Moscow	Vadim Korovin	People's Freedom Party	4,198	2.6
205	Preobrazhensky single-mandate constituency	Moscow	Nikolay Korsakov	Communist Party	17,032	10.5
205	Preobrazhensky single-mandate constituency	Moscow	Dmitry Mashenskikh	Patriots of Russia	1,266	0.8
205	Preobrazhensky single-mandate constituency	Moscow	Vladimir Saltanovich	Communists of Russia	2,811	1.7
205	Preobrazhensky single-mandate constituency	Moscow	Yevdokiya Shlyapina	Civilian Power	1,849	1.1
206	Tushino single-mandate constituency	Moscow	Sergey Baburin	Communist Party	20,007	12.7
206	Tushino single-mandate constituency	Moscow	Eduard Bagirov	Patriots of Russia	1,042	0.7
206	Tushino single-mandate constituency	Moscow	Igor Vladimirsky	Party of Growth	5,764	3.7
206	Tushino single-mandate constituency	Moscow	Dmitry Gudkov	Yabloko	32,147	20.4
206	Tushino single-mandate constituency	Moscow	Igor Korotchenko	Rodina	28,248	17.9
206	Tushino single-mandate constituency	Moscow	Sergey Marusov	Liberal Democratic Party	9,864	6.3
206	Tushino single-mandate constituency	Moscow	Gennady Onishchenko	United Russia	41,041	26.0
206	Tushino single-mandate constituency	Moscow	Pyotr Pakhomov	Communists of Russia	3,839	2.4
206	Tushino single-mandate constituency	Moscow	Ilya Sviridov	A Just Russia	10,655	6.8
206	Tushino single-mandate constituency	Moscow	Dmitry Chugunov	Civilian Power	1,925	1.2
206	Tushino single-mandate constituency	Moscow	Alexander Shumsky	Civic Platform	3,083	2.0
207	Khovrino single-mandate constituency	Moscow	Alexey Alexeev	A Just Russia	12,471	7.6
207	Khovrino single-mandate constituency	Moscow	Irina Belykh	United Russia	58,401	35.6
207	Khovrino single-mandate constituency	Moscow	Vasily Grebenchenko	Civilian Power	2,512	1.5
207	Khovrino single-mandate constituency	Moscow	Artur Grokhovsky	Greens	4,435	2.7
207	Khovrino single-mandate constituency	Moscow	Yekaterina Kolosova	Patriots of Russia	6,682	4.1
207	Khovrino single-mandate constituency	Moscow	Sergey Korepanov	Communists of Russia	5,460	3.3
207	Khovrino single-mandate constituency	Moscow	Yelena Pavlova	Communist Party	26,890	16.4
207	Khovrino single-mandate constituency	Moscow	Mikhail Peskov	Yabloko	17,919	10.9
207	Khovrino single-mandate constituency	Moscow	Yuliya Timoshina	Liberal Democratic Party	16,781	10.2
207	Khovrino single-mandate constituency	Moscow	Aleksey Shcherbina	People's Freedom Party	4,921	3.0
207	Khovrino single-mandate constituency	Moscow	Yana Yaroshevskaya	Rodina	7,380	4.5
208	Centre single-mandate constituency	Moscow	Maria Baronova	Independent	13,197	8.1
208	Centre single-mandate constituency	Moscow	Nikolay Gonchar	United Russia	57,110	35.3
208	Centre single-mandate constituency	Moscow	Mikhail Degtyarev	Liberal Democratic Party	12,573	7.8
208	Centre single-mandate constituency	Moscow	Dmitri Zakharov	Communists of Russia	4,956	3.1
208	Centre single-mandate constituency	Moscow	Andrey Zubov	People's Freedom Party	18,789	11.6
208	Centre single-mandate constituency	Moscow	Maria Katasonova	Rodina	6,569	4.1
208	Centre single-mandate constituency	Moscow	Aleksei Mikhailov	Civilian Power	2,338	1.4
208	Centre single-mandate constituency	Moscow	Andrei Rudenko	Civic Platform	3,160	2.0
208	Centre single-mandate constituency	Moscow	Kristina Simonyan	A Just Russia	8,095	5.0
208	Centre single-mandate constituency	Moscow	Kseniya Sokolova	Party of Growth	6,912	4.3
208	Centre single-mandate constituency	Moscow	Pavel Tarasov	Communist Party	21,442	13.2
208	Centre single-mandate constituency	Moscow	Anton Umnikov	Greens	4,125	2.5
208	Centre single-mandate constituency	Moscow	Oleg Eston	Patriots of Russia	2,744	1.7
209	Cheryomushki single-mandate constituency	Moscow	Sergey Vasilyev	A Just Russia	11,365	6.8
209	Cheryomushki single-mandate constituency	Moscow	Sergey Dorofeyev	Greens	3,984	2.4
209	Cheryomushki single-mandate constituency	Moscow	Darya Mitina	Communists of Russia	7,931	4.7
209	Cheryomushki single-mandate constituency	Moscow	Dmitry Morozov	United Russia	59,326	35.4
209	Cheryomushki single-mandate constituency	Moscow	Aleksey Petrovichev	Rodina	5,573	3.3
209	Cheryomushki single-mandate constituency	Moscow	Vladimir Rodin	Communist Party	21,946	13.1
209	Cheryomushki single-mandate constituency	Moscow	Yelena Rusakova	Yabloko	20,538	12.2
209	Cheryomushki single-mandate constituency	Moscow	Maria Sorokina	Patriots of Russia	3,904	2.3
209	Cheryomushki single-mandate constituency	Moscow	Sergey Stankevich	Party of Growth	8,321	5.0
209	Cheryomushki single-mandate constituency	Moscow	Ilya Ukhov	Civilian Power	783	0.5
209	Cheryomushki single-mandate constituency	Moscow	Anton Yurikov	Liberal Democratic Party	9,811	5.8
209	Cheryomushki single-mandate constituency	Moscow	Konstantinas Yankauskas	People's Freedom Party	14,244	8.5
210	Chertanovo single-mandate constituency	Moscow	Dmitry Androsov	People's Freedom Party	5,334	3.5
210	Chertanovo single-mandate constituency	Moscow	Anatoly Vyborny	United Russia	65,144	42.2
210	Chertanovo single-mandate constituency	Moscow	Platon Grekov	Liberal Democratic Party	13,505	8.8
210	Chertanovo single-mandate constituency	Moscow	Denis Davydov	Communist Party	18,700	12.1
210	Chertanovo single-mandate constituency	Moscow	Vadim Kokarev	Patriots of Russia	4,208	2.7
210	Chertanovo single-mandate constituency	Moscow	Vladimir Kochetkov	A Just Russia	11,554	7.5
210	Chertanovo single-mandate constituency	Moscow	Alexey Krapukhin	Yabloko	11,312	7.3
210	Chertanovo single-mandate constituency	Moscow	Denis Merkulov	Rodina	4,910	3.2
210	Chertanovo single-mandate constituency	Moscow	Mikhail Rastashansky	Civic Platform	1,307	0.8
210	Chertanovo single-mandate constituency	Moscow	Nikolay Topornin	Party of Growth	5,923	3.8
210	Chertanovo single-mandate constituency	Moscow	Andrey Tsitsilin	Greens	4,818	3.1
210	Chertanovo single-mandate constituency	Moscow	Mark Chumakov	Communists of Russia	5,316	3.4
210	Chertanovo single-mandate constituency	Moscow	Pyotr Shcherbachenko	Civilian Power	2,157	1.4
211	East single-mandate constituency	Saint Petersburg	Vladislav Bakulin	Party of Growth	15,274	11.9
211	East single-mandate constituency	Saint Petersburg	Igor Divinsky	United Russia	47,703	37.0
211	East single-mandate constituency	Saint Petersburg	Andrey Ivanov	Rodina	4,752	3.7
211	East single-mandate constituency	Saint Petersburg	Mikhail Koyfman	Civic Platform	964	0.7
211	East single-mandate constituency	Saint Petersburg	Sergey Kochanzhi	Liberal Democratic Party	11,639	9.0
211	East single-mandate constituency	Saint Petersburg	Konstantin Lavrinyuk	Patriots of Russia	1,380	1.1
211	East single-mandate constituency	Saint Petersburg	Viktor Lozhechko	A Just Russia	11,931	9.3
211	East single-mandate constituency	Saint Petersburg	Irina Melnikova	People's Freedom Party	7,112	5.5
211	East single-mandate constituency	Saint Petersburg	Yury Savin	Communists of Russia	4,900	3.8
211	East single-mandate constituency	Saint Petersburg	Mikhail Stupakov	Yabloko	11,921	9.3
211	East single-mandate constituency	Saint Petersburg	Olga Khodunova	Communist Party	11,210	8.7
212	West single-mandate constituency	Saint Petersburg	Alexander Baranyuk	Greens	7,721	4.9
212	West single-mandate constituency	Saint Petersburg	Kermen Basangova	Communists of Russia	5,347	3.4
212	West single-mandate constituency	Saint Petersburg	Sergey Vostretsov	United Russia	42,306	27.1
212	West single-mandate constituency	Saint Petersburg	Olga Galkina	Party of Growth	19,397	12.4
212	West single-mandate constituency	Saint Petersburg	Alexey Gerasimov	Rodina	5,554	3.6
212	West single-mandate constituency	Saint Petersburg	Vladimir Yedryshev	Patriots of Russia	2,488	1.6
212	West single-mandate constituency	Saint Petersburg	Anna Zamaraeva	Liberal Democratic Party	17,344	11.1
212	West single-mandate constituency	Saint Petersburg	Ilya Lvov	People's Freedom Party	4,298	2.8
212	West single-mandate constituency	Saint Petersburg	Alexander Olkhovsky	Communist Party	18,168	11.6
212	West single-mandate constituency	Saint Petersburg	Andrey Palevich	Yabloko	11,858	7.6
212	West single-mandate constituency	Saint Petersburg	Vasily Tarsukov	Civic Platform	1,860	1.2
212	West single-mandate constituency	Saint Petersburg	Dmitry Ushakov	A Just Russia	19,690	12.6
213	North single-mandate constituency	Saint Petersburg	Konstantin Bulgakov	Civilian Power	1,774	1.1
213	North single-mandate constituency	Saint Petersburg	Georgy Glagovsky	Yabloko	16,578	10.6
213	North single-mandate constituency	Saint Petersburg	Natalya Greys	A Just Russia	15,198	9.7
213	North single-mandate constituency	Saint Petersburg	Natalya Gryaznevich	People's Freedom Party	6,185	4.0
213	North single-mandate constituency	Saint Petersburg	Oleg Kapitanov	Liberal Democratic Party	14,744	9.4
213	North single-mandate constituency	Saint Petersburg	Andrey Kochergin	Rodina	5,383	3.4
213	North single-mandate constituency	Saint Petersburg	Igor Kuznik	Patriots of Russia	939	0.6
213	North single-mandate constituency	Saint Petersburg	Yevgeny Marchenko	United Russia	59,534	38.1
213	North single-mandate constituency	Saint Petersburg	Sergey Panteleev	Communist Party	16,999	10.9
213	North single-mandate constituency	Saint Petersburg	Natalya Petukhova	Party of Growth	14,025	9.0
213	North single-mandate constituency	Saint Petersburg	Alexander Sakharov	Communists of Russia	4,006	2.6
213	North single-mandate constituency	Saint Petersburg	Alexander Fomishin	Civic Platform	988	0.6
214	North-East single-mandate constituency	Saint Petersburg	Mikhail Amosov	Yabloko	19,804	13.4
214	North-East single-mandate constituency	Saint Petersburg	Yury Gatchin	Communist Party	17,060	11.5
214	North-East single-mandate constituency	Saint Petersburg	Ivan Doktorov	Civic Platform	2,089	1.4
214	North-East single-mandate constituency	Saint Petersburg	Yelena Drapeko	A Just Russia	54,324	36.7
214	North-East single-mandate constituency	Saint Petersburg	Irina Komolova	Party of Growth	15,372	10.4
214	North-East single-mandate constituency	Saint Petersburg	Mikhail Kontorin	Civilian Power	875	0.6
214	North-East single-mandate constituency	Saint Petersburg	Olga Panyuta	Communists of Russia	3,755	2.5
214	North-East single-mandate constituency	Saint Petersburg	Andrey Petrov	Rodina	5,322	3.6
214	North-East single-mandate constituency	Saint Petersburg	Andrey Pivovarov	People's Freedom Party	5,013	3.4
214	North-East single-mandate constituency	Saint Petersburg	Yegor Tratnikov	Liberal Democratic Party	16,960	11.5
214	North-East single-mandate constituency	Saint Petersburg	Fyodor Turkin	Patriots of Russia	7,470	5.0
215	North-West single-mandate constituency	Saint Petersburg	Anatoly Golov	Yabloko	16,728	11.2
215	North-West single-mandate constituency	Saint Petersburg	Irina Ivanova	Communist Party	17,408	11.7
215	North-West single-mandate constituency	Saint Petersburg	Vladimir Katenev	United Russia	45,790	30.7
215	North-West single-mandate constituency	Saint Petersburg	Andrey Krutov	Party of Growth	11,793	7.9
215	North-West single-mandate constituency	Saint Petersburg	Oleg Lavrov	Liberal Democratic Party	13,676	9.2
215	North-West single-mandate constituency	Saint Petersburg	Oleg Maksakov	People's Freedom Party	3,901	2.6
215	North-West single-mandate constituency	Saint Petersburg	Oleg Nilov	A Just Russia	28,426	19.0
215	North-West single-mandate constituency	Saint Petersburg	Alexander Novikov	Greens	3,819	2.6
215	North-West single-mandate constituency	Saint Petersburg	Olga Popova	Civic Platform	1,993	1.3
215	North-West single-mandate constituency	Saint Petersburg	Alexander Privalov	Communists of Russia	2,795	1.9
215	North-West single-mandate constituency	Saint Petersburg	Mikhail Starodubtsev	Patriots of Russia	2,895	1.9
216	Center single-mandate constituency	Saint Petersburg	Vladimir Bortko	Communist Party	34,167	25.2
216	Center single-mandate constituency	Saint Petersburg	Vitaly Glavatsky	Communists of Russia	3,183	2.3
216	Center single-mandate constituency	Saint Petersburg	Galina Kirichenko	Civic Platform	3,473	2.6
216	Center single-mandate constituency	Saint Petersburg	Boris Paykin	Liberal Democratic Party	23,011	17.0
216	Center single-mandate constituency	Saint Petersburg	Sergey Popov	A Just Russia	14,473	10.7
216	Center single-mandate constituency	Saint Petersburg	Maxim Reznik	Party of Growth	24,062	17.7
216	Center single-mandate constituency	Saint Petersburg	Nikolay Rybakov	Yabloko	18,974	14.0
216	Center single-mandate constituency	Saint Petersburg	Pavel Spivachevsky	Rodina	4,701	3.5
216	Center single-mandate constituency	Saint Petersburg	Alexander Startsev	Greens	4,832	3.6
216	Center single-mandate constituency	Saint Petersburg	Arkady Chaplygin	People's Freedom Party	4,842	3.6
217	South-East single-mandate constituency	Saint Petersburg	Anatoly Alexashin	A Just Russia	7,810	6.0
217	South-East single-mandate constituency	Saint Petersburg	Sergey Antipov	Liberal Democratic Party	14,740	11.3
217	South-East single-mandate constituency	Saint Petersburg	Anatoly Artyukh	Patriots of Russia	1,298	1.0
217	South-East single-mandate constituency	Saint Petersburg	Mikhail Gorny	Yabloko	6,454	5.0
217	South-East single-mandate constituency	Saint Petersburg	Oksana V. Dmitriyeva	Civilian Power	6,164	4.7
217	South-East single-mandate constituency	Saint Petersburg	Oksana G. Dmitriyeva	Party of Growth	31,124	23.9
217	South-East single-mandate constituency	Saint Petersburg	Olesya Dmitriyeva	Greens	2,867	2.2
217	South-East single-mandate constituency	Saint Petersburg	Sergey Kuzin	People's Freedom Party	2,207	1.7
217	South-East single-mandate constituency	Saint Petersburg	Olga Perova	Communists of Russia	3,301	2.5
217	South-East single-mandate constituency	Saint Petersburg	Tatyana Prokhorova	Civic Platform	1,216	0.9
217	South-East single-mandate constituency	Saint Petersburg	Mikhail Romanov	United Russia	40,834	31.4
217	South-East single-mandate constituency	Saint Petersburg	Svyatoslav Sokol	Communist Party	9,843	7.6
217	South-East single-mandate constituency	Saint Petersburg	Maryana Yakovleva	Rodina	2,234	1.7
218	South single-mandate constituency	Saint Petersburg	Alexey Grave	Patriots of Russia	3,090	2.0
218	South single-mandate constituency	Saint Petersburg	Lev Dmitriyev	People's Freedom Party	4,463	2.8
218	South single-mandate constituency	Saint Petersburg	Alexey Kovalyov	A Just Russia	22,845	14.5
218	South single-mandate constituency	Saint Petersburg	Vitaly Milonov	United Russia	56,068	35.6
218	South single-mandate constituency	Saint Petersburg	Dmitry Pavlov	Party of Growth	16,489	10.5
218	South single-mandate constituency	Saint Petersburg	Yury Perevyazkin	Communists of Russia	5,960	3.8
218	South single-mandate constituency	Saint Petersburg	Ilya Rubtsov	Liberal Democratic Party	12,452	7.9
218	South single-mandate constituency	Saint Petersburg	German Sadulaev	Communist Party	12,075	7.7
218	South single-mandate constituency	Saint Petersburg	Ruslan Tikhomirov	Civic Platform	2,281	1.4
218	South single-mandate constituency	Saint Petersburg	Anna Filonenko	Rodina	5,425	3.4
218	South single-mandate constituency	Saint Petersburg	Olga Tsepilova	Yabloko	16,382	10.3
219	Sevastopol single-mandate constituency	Sevastopol	Dmitry Belik	United Russia	46,960	34.5
219	Sevastopol single-mandate constituency	Sevastopol	Andrey Brezhnev	Rodina	2,737	2.0
219	Sevastopol single-mandate constituency	Sevastopol	Mikhail Bryachak	A Just Russia	6,817	5.0
219	Sevastopol single-mandate constituency	Sevastopol	Ivan Yermakov	Patriots of Russia	2,589	1.9
219	Sevastopol single-mandate constituency	Sevastopol	Ilya Zhuravlyov	Liberal Democratic Party	14,443	10.6
219	Sevastopol single-mandate constituency	Sevastopol	Vladimir Komoedov	Communist Party	24,504	18.0
219	Sevastopol single-mandate constituency	Sevastopol	Oleg Nikolaev	Party of Growth	33,791	24.8
219	Sevastopol single-mandate constituency	Sevastopol	Mikhail Tretyakov	Communists of Russia	2,554	1.9
219	Sevastopol single-mandate constituency	Sevastopol	Nikita Shtykov	Greens	1,831	1.3
220	Jewish single-mandate constituency	Jewish Autonomous Oblast	Vasily Dmitrienko	Yabloko	988	2.0
220	Jewish single-mandate constituency	Jewish Autonomous Oblast	Vladimir Dudin	A Just Russia	2,699	5.4
220	Jewish single-mandate constituency	Jewish Autonomous Oblast	Konstantin Lazarev	Communist Party	10,384	21.0
220	Jewish single-mandate constituency	Jewish Autonomous Oblast	Konstantin Larionov	Communists of Russia	1,952	3.9
220	Jewish single-mandate constituency	Jewish Autonomous Oblast	Ivan Prokhodtsev	Independent	3,688	7.4
220	Jewish single-mandate constituency	Jewish Autonomous Oblast	Galina Timchenko	Liberal Democratic Party	8,041	16.2
220	Jewish single-mandate constituency	Jewish Autonomous Oblast	Anatoly Tikhomirov	United Russia	21,783	44.0
221	Nenets single-mandate constituency	Nenets Autonomous Okrug	Sergey Kotkin	United Russia	5,862	46.9
221	Nenets single-mandate constituency	Nenets Autonomous Okrug	Alexey Lebedev	Communists of Russia	212	1.7
221	Nenets single-mandate constituency	Nenets Autonomous Okrug	Alexander Sablin	Communist Party	3,491	27.9
221	Nenets single-mandate constituency	Nenets Autonomous Okrug	Andrey Smychenkov	Liberal Democratic Party	1,436	11.5
221	Nenets single-mandate constituency	Nenets Autonomous Okrug	Nataliya Soluyanova	Rodina	452	3.6
221	Nenets single-mandate constituency	Nenets Autonomous Okrug	Viktor Shustrov	A Just Russia	1,045	8.4
222	Khanty-Mansiysk single-mandate constituency	Khanty-Mansi Autonomous Okrug	Anatoly Vats	A Just Russia	15,432	6.9
222	Khanty-Mansiysk single-mandate constituency	Khanty-Mansi Autonomous Okrug	Pavel Zavalny	United Russia	111,163	49.5
222	Khanty-Mansiysk single-mandate constituency	Khanty-Mansi Autonomous Okrug	Tatyana Irduganova	Communists of Russia	14,562	6.5
222	Khanty-Mansiysk single-mandate constituency	Khanty-Mansi Autonomous Okrug	Alexander Lomakin	Patriots of Russia	8,380	3.7
222	Khanty-Mansiysk single-mandate constituency	Khanty-Mansi Autonomous Okrug	Yevgeny Markov	Liberal Democratic Party	42,651	19.0
222	Khanty-Mansiysk single-mandate constituency	Khanty-Mansi Autonomous Okrug	Oleg Rovin	Greens	4,493	2.0
222	Khanty-Mansiysk single-mandate constituency	Khanty-Mansi Autonomous Okrug	Alexey Savintsev	Communist Party	18,597	8.3
222	Khanty-Mansiysk single-mandate constituency	Khanty-Mansi Autonomous Okrug	Garry Stolyarov	Party of Growth	9,493	4.2
223	Nizhnevartovsk single-mandate constituency	Khanty-Mansi Autonomous Okrug	Vadim Abdurrakhmanov	Communists of Russia	8,054	4.3
223	Nizhnevartovsk single-mandate constituency	Khanty-Mansi Autonomous Okrug	Sergey Vorobyov	People's Freedom Party	3,443	1.8
223	Nizhnevartovsk single-mandate constituency	Khanty-Mansi Autonomous Okrug	Aygul Zaripova	Party of Growth	4,873	2.6
223	Nizhnevartovsk single-mandate constituency	Khanty-Mansi Autonomous Okrug	Vladimir Zinovyev	Patriots of Russia	3,506	1.9
223	Nizhnevartovsk single-mandate constituency	Khanty-Mansi Autonomous Okrug	Alexander Peterman	Rodina	27,927	15.0
223	Nizhnevartovsk single-mandate constituency	Khanty-Mansi Autonomous Okrug	Mikhail Serdyuk	A Just Russia	20,260	10.9
223	Nizhnevartovsk single-mandate constituency	Khanty-Mansi Autonomous Okrug	Alexander Sidorov	United Russia	73,451	39.4
223	Nizhnevartovsk single-mandate constituency	Khanty-Mansi Autonomous Okrug	Vladimir Sysoev	Liberal Democratic Party	24,929	13.4
223	Nizhnevartovsk single-mandate constituency	Khanty-Mansi Autonomous Okrug	Vyacheslav Tetyokin	Communist Party	11,893	6.4
223	Nizhnevartovsk single-mandate constituency	Khanty-Mansi Autonomous Okrug	Svetlana Titova	Yabloko	7,998	4.3
224	Chukotka single-mandate constituency	Chukotka	Yuliya Butakova	Liberal Democratic Party	3,214	18.7
224	Chukotka single-mandate constituency	Chukotka	Vladimir Galtsov	Communist Party	1,631	9.5
224	Chukotka single-mandate constituency	Chukotka	Viktor Kolpakov	Communists of Russia	820	4.8
224	Chukotka single-mandate constituency	Chukotka	Yelena Polovodova	A Just Russia	1,126	6.5
224	Chukotka single-mandate constituency	Chukotka	Valentina Rudchenko	United Russia	10,435	60.6
225	Yamalo-Nenets single-mandate constituency	Yamalo-Nenets Autonomous Okrug	Andrey Denisov	Party of Growth	6,639	2.7
225	Yamalo-Nenets single-mandate constituency	Yamalo-Nenets Autonomous Okrug	Maxim Karpikov	Communist Party	12,242	5.0
225	Yamalo-Nenets single-mandate constituency	Yamalo-Nenets Autonomous Okrug	Alexey Kolesnikov	Communists of Russia	8,452	3.5
225	Yamalo-Nenets single-mandate constituency	Yamalo-Nenets Autonomous Okrug	Grigory Ledkov	United Russia	158,298	65.0
225	Yamalo-Nenets single-mandate constituency	Yamalo-Nenets Autonomous Okrug	Sergey Noskin	Rodina	5,805	2.4
225	Yamalo-Nenets single-mandate constituency	Yamalo-Nenets Autonomous Okrug	Sergey Popov	A Just Russia	10,242	4.2
225	Yamalo-Nenets single-mandate constituency	Yamalo-Nenets Autonomous Okrug	Denis Sadovnikov	Liberal Democratic Party	34,609	14.2
225	Yamalo-Nenets single-mandate constituency	Yamalo-Nenets Autonomous Okrug	Mikhail Ushakov	Independent	7,401	3.0
