= CPRF faction in the State Duma =

Communist faction in the lower house of the Federal Assembly of Russia

Communist Party of the Russian Federation Коммунистическая партия Российской Федерации
- Chamber: State Duma
- Legislature(s): 1st, 2nd, 3rd, 4th, 5th, 6th, 7th, 8th
- Foundation: 13 January 1994
- Member parties: CPRF; Left Front; DPA; DZNS
- President: Gennady Zyuganov (since 1994)
- Vice presidents: Nikolay Kolomeitsev (since 2016)
- Representation: 57 / 450
- Ideology: Communism; Social conservatism
- Website: Page on the State Duma website

The Communist Party of the Russian Federation faction in the State Duma is the deputy association of the Communist Party of the Russian Federation in the State Duma of the VIII convocation (2021–2026).

In the 2021 elections to the State Duma, the CPRF, according to official data, received 18.94% of the vote, which gave it the right to 48 deputy mandates. 9 people nominated by the party won the elections in single-mandate constituencies. Thus, according to the results of the elections to the State Duma, the Communist Party faction received 57 seats in the State Duma of the VIII convocation.

The voting took place in a tense atmosphere and was accompanied by massive violations of electoral legislation, especially in Moscow, where opposition candidates supported by Smart Voting (Valery Rashkin, Denis Parfenov, Mikhail Lobanov, Anastasia Udaltsova, Sergei Obukhov, Mikhail Tarantsov, as well as representatives of other political forces Anastasia Bryukhanova and Sergey Mitrokhin) were in the lead all three days of voting, but after adding the results of remote electronic voting (DEG) they were defeated in all districts, which significantly reduced the possible representation of the party in the new convocation of the Duma. The Communist Party of the Russian Federation did not recognize the results of the elections in Moscow, demanded that the results of the DEG be canceled as falsified and organized mass protests in the format of meetings with deputies.

On October 7, an organizational meeting of the faction was held, at which Gennady Zyuganov was elected its chairman, and Nikolay Kolomeitsev was elected first deputy chairman.

== Activities ==
In the election of the Chairman of the State Duma, the faction nominated Dmitry Novikov, who received 61 votes against 360 from the current head of parliament Vyacheslav Volodin. At the same time, in addition to the deputies of the faction, Oksana Dmitriyeva from the Party of Growth and part of the LDPR faction also voted for Novikov: Sergey Karginov, Sergey Leonov, Evgeny Markov, Dmitry Svishchev, Vladimir Sipyagin, Ivan Sukharev and Boris Chernyshov.

On October 14, 2021, the United Russia faction blocked the proposal of the Communist Party faction to conduct a parliamentary investigation into the revealed facts of torture of prisoners.

- 96 deputies voted for the proposal of the CPRF (of which 1 deputy of the United Russia faction - Alexander Polyakov, 53 deputies of the CPRF faction, 23 deputies of the A Just Russia — For Truth faction, 12 deputies of the LDPR faction, 7 deputies of the New People faction);
- 261 deputies voted against (including 258 deputies of the United Russia faction, 2 deputies of the Communist Party faction - Sergei Gavrilov and Alexander Yushchenko, 1 deputy of the LDPR faction - Ivan Musatov);
- 1 deputy abstained (Oksana Dmitriyeva, not a member of the faction).

On November 25, 2021, the deputy from the Communist Party of the Russian Federation Valery Rashkin was deprived of parliamentary immunity.

- 341 deputies voted for depriving him of his parliamentary immunity and agreeing to initiate a criminal case against him (including 287 deputies of the United Russia faction, 20 deputies of the A Just Russia faction, 21 deputies of the LDPR faction, 12 deputies of the New People faction and 1 Deputy, not a member of the faction - Yevgeny Marchenko);
- 55 deputies voted against (including 54 deputies of the Communist Party faction and 1 deputy of the Just Russia faction - Dmitry Kuznetsov);
- 2 deputies abstained (both from the A Just Russia faction - Vadim Belousov and Nikolai Burlyayev).

== Composition ==
=== 8th State Duma ===
The composition of the faction is indicated in accordance with the official publication of Rossiyskaya Gazeta and the list of deputies on the official website of the State Duma.

| Constituency | Name | Date of birth | Place of birth | Party | Comment |
|---|---|---|---|---|---|
| Party list | Gennady Zyuganov (Party and faction leader) | 26 June 1944 | Russian SFSR (Mymrino, Oryol Oblast) | CPRF | |
| Party list | Svetlana Savitskaya | 8 August 1948 | Russian SFSR (Moscow) | CPRF | |
| Party list | Yury Afonin | 22 March 1977 | Russian SFSR (Tula) | CPRF | |
| Party list | Andrey Klychkov | 2 September 1979 | Russian SFSR (Kaliningrad) | CPRF | Renounced the mandate, which was then transferred to Robert Kochiev |
| Party list | Robert Kochiev | 16 March 1966 | Georgian SSR (Tskhinvali, South Ossetian AO) | CPRF | |
| Party list | Ivan Melnikov (1st Vice Speaker) | 7 August 1950 | Russian SFSR (Bogoroditsk, Tula Oblast) | CPRF | |
| Party list | Vladimir Kashin | 10 August 1948 | Russian SFSR (Nazaryevo, Ryazan Oblast) | CPRF | |
| Party list | Dmitry Novikov | 12 September 1969 | Russian SFSR (Khabarovsk) | CPRF | |
| Party list | Nikolay Kharitonov | 30 October 1948 | Russian SFSR (Rezino, Novosibirsk Oblast) | CPRF | |
| Party list | Nikolay Kolomeitsev | 1 September 1956 | Russian SFSR (Protsikov, Rostov Oblast) | CPRF | |
| Party list | Sergey Shargunov | 12 May 1980 | Russian SFSR (Moscow) | CPRF | |
| Party list | Vadim Kumin | 1 January 1973 | Russian SFSR (Chelyabinsk) | CPRF | |
| Party list | Yury Sinelshchikov | 26 September 1947 | Russian SFSR (Bogucharovo, Tula Oblast) | CPRF | |
| Party list | Kazbek Taysaev | 12 February 1967 | Russian SFSR (Chikola, North Ossetia) | CPRF | |
| Party list | Alexey Kurinny | 18 January 1974 | Georgian SSR (Tskhinvali, South Ossetian AO) | CPRF | |
| Rubtsovsk | Maria Prusakova | 14 September 1983 | Russian SFSR (Barnaul) | CPRF | Supported by Smart Voting in their constituency. |
| Party list | Anzhelika Glazkova | 28 December 1968 | Russian SFSR (Kostroma) | DZNS; CPRF | |
| Ufa (defeated); Party list | Alexander Yushchenko | 19 November 1969 | Byelorussian SSR (Mazyr) | CPRF | Supported by Smart Voting in their constituency. |
| Party list | Vyacheslav Markhayev | 1 June 1955 | Russian SFSR (Sharaldai, Irkutsk Oblast) | CPRF | |
| Party list | Anatoly Bifov | 7 January 1963 | Russian SFSR (Baksan, Kabardino-Balkaria) | CPRF | |
| Party list | Nikolay Arefiev | 11 March 1949 | Russian SFSR (Chagan, Astrakhan Obl.) | CPRF | |
| Party list | Boris Komotsky | 31 January 1956 | East Germany (Potsdam) | CPRF | |
| Syktyvkar | Oleg Mikhailov | 6 January 1987 | Russian SFSR (Pechora, Komi ASSR) | CPRF | Supported by Smart Voting in their constituency. |
| Mari El | Sergey Kazankov | 9 October 1972 | Russian SFSR (Maryino, Mari ASSR) | CPRF | Supported by Smart Voting in their constituency. |
| Party list | Irina Filatova | 8 August 1978 | Russian SFSR (Novosibirsk) | CPRF | |
| Party list | Sergey Levchenko | 2 November 1953 | Russian SFSR (Novosibirsk) | CPRF | |
| Irkutsk | Mikhail Shchapov | 20 September 1975 | Russian SFSR (Kirensk, Irkutsk Obl.) | CPRF | Supported by Smart Voting in their constituency. |
| Central Tatarstan (defeated); Party list | Artem Prokofiev | 31 December 1983 | Russian SFSR (Kazan, Tatar ASSR) | CPRF | Supported by Smart Voting in their constituency. |
| Party list | Maria Drobot | 21 March 1982 | Russian SFSR (Rostov-on-Don) | CPRF | |
| Party list | Ivan Babich | 2 September 1982 | Russian SFSR (Nazarovo, Krasnoyarsk Krai) | CPRF | |
| Party list | Nikolay Osadchy | 8 December 1957 | Russian SFSR (Tuapse, Krasnodar Krai) | CPRF | |
| Sakhalin (defeated); Party list | Alexey Kornienko | 22 July 1976 | Uzbek SSR (Namangan) | CPRF | Supported by Smart Voting in their constituency. |
| Party list | Sergei Gavrilov | 27 January 1966 | Russian SFSR (Tula) | CPRF | |
| Party list | Nikolay Ivanov | 17 January 1957 | Russian SFSR (Kursk) | CPRF | |
| Party list | Roman Lyabikhov | 7 May 1973 | Russian SFSR (Severodvinsk, Arkhangelsk Obl.) | CPRF | |
| Tver (defeated); Party list | Oleg Lebedev | 12 October 1976 | Russian SFSR (Tula) | CPRF | |
| Engels (defeated); Party list | Olga Alimova | 10 April 1953 | Russian SFSR (Saratov) | CPRF | Supported by Smart Voting in their constituency. |
| Novomoskovsk (defeated); Party list | Vladimir Isakov | 25 February 1987 | Russian SFSR (Tula) | CPRF; LKSM RF | Supported by Smart Voting in their constituency. |
| Party list | Anatoly Lokot | 18 January 1959 | Russian SFSR (Novosibirsk) | CPRF | Renounced the mandate, which was then transferred to Renat Suleymanov |
| Central NSB (defeated); Party list | Renat Suleymanov | 24 December 1965 | Russian SFSR (Novosibirsk) | CPRF | Supported by Smart Voting in their constituency. |
| Party list | Vladimir Blotsky | 10 November 1977 | Russian SFSR (Klin, Moscow Oblast) | CPRF | |
| Party list | Mikhail Berulava | 3 August 1950 | Georgian SSR (Sukhumi, Abkhaz ASSR) | CPRF | |
| Party list | Sergey Panteleev | 4 July 1951 | Russian SFSR (Zapolye, Vologda Oblast) | CPRF | |
| Party list | Georgy Kamnev | 5 October 1983 | Russian SFSR (Serdobsk, Penza Oblast) | CPRF | |
| Party list | Nikolay Vasiliev | 28 March 1958 | Russian SFSR (Grachyovsky Dist., Orenburg Obl.) | CPRF | |
| Krasnogorsk (defeated); Party list | Konstantin Cheremisov | 7 May 1960 | | CPRF | Renounced the mandate, which was then transferred to Boris Ivanyuzhenkov |
| Podolsk (defeated); Party list | Boris Ivanyuzhenkov | 25 February 1966 | Russian SFSR (Reutov, Moscow Oblast) | CPRF | Supported by Smart Voting in their constituency. |
| Party list | Viktor Sobolev | 23 February 1950 | Russian SFSR (Kalinino, Krasnodar Krai) | DPA; CPRF | |
| Omsk | Andrey Alekhin | 9 February 1959 | Russian SFSR (Novosibirsk) | CPRF | Supported by Smart Voting in their constituency. |
| Moskalenki | Oleg Smolin | 10 February 1952 | Kazakh SSR (Poludino, North Kazakhstan) | CPRF | Supported by Smart Voting in their constituency. |
| Tolyatti | Leonid Kalashnikov | 6 August 1960 | Russian SFSR (Stepnoy Dvorets, Buryat ASSR) | CPRF | Supported by Smart Voting in their constituency. |
| Party list | Mikhail Avdeev | 6 March 1977 | Russian SFSR (Moscow) | CPRF | |
| Central Moscow (defeated); Party list | Nina Ostanina | 26 December 1955 | Russian SFSR (Kolpakovo, Altai Krai) | CPRF | |
| Promyshlenny | Mikhail Matveyev | 13 May 1968 | Ukrainian SSR (Dnipropetrovsk) | CPRF | Supported by Smart Voting in their constituency. |
| Taganrog (defeated); Party list | Evgeny Bessonov | 26 November 1968 | Russian SFSR (Rostov-on-Don) | CPRF | Supported by Smart Voting in their constituency. |
| Party list | Nikolay Ezersky | 8 May 1956 | Russian SFSR (Palmino, Sverdlovsk Oblast) | CPRF | |
| Babushkinsky (defeated); Party list | Valery Rashkin | 14 March 1955 | Russian SFSR (Zhilino, Kaliningrad Oblast) | CPRF | Supported by Smart Voting in their constituency. Deprived of mandate 25 May 2022, mandate transferred to Anastasia Udaltsova |
| Nagatinsky (defeated) | Anastasia Udaltsova | 2 September 1978 | Ukrainian SSR (Cherkasy) | Left Front; CPRF | Supported by Smart Voting in their constituency. On 29 June 2022 Valery Rashkin's mandate was transferred to her. |
| Preobrazhensky (defeated); Party list | Sergei Obukhov | 5 October 1958 | Ukrainian SSR (Lviv) | CPRF | Supported by Smart Voting in their constituency. |
| Medvedkovo (defeated); Party list | Denis Parfenov | 11 September 1987 | Russian SFSR (Moscow) | CPRF | Supported by Smart Voting in their constituency. |
| Yakutsk | Petr Ammosov | 22 September 1966 | Russian SFSR (Yakutsk) | CPRF | |
