= Bazhenovo =

Bazhenovo may refer to:

- Bazhenovo, Belebeyevsky District, Republic of Bashkortostan, a locality in Republic of Bashkortostan
- Bazhenovo, Birsky District, Republic of Bashkortostan, a locality in Republic of Bashkortostan

== See also ==
- Bazhenov
