= Glazkov =

Glazkov (Russian: Глазков) is a Russian masculine surname, its feminine counterpart is Glazkova. Notable people with the surname include:

- Anna Glazkova (born 1981), Belarusian rhythmic gymnast
- Anzhelika Glazkova (born 1968), Russian politician
- Georgy Glazkov (1911–1968), Soviet footballer and coach
- Nikita Glazkov (born 1992), Russian fencer
- Nikolay Glazkov (1919–1979), Russian poet and actor
- Sergey Glazkov (born 1967), Soviet/Russian footballer
- Vyacheslav Glazkov (born 1984), Ukrainian boxer
- Yuri Glazkov (1939–2008), Soviet cosmonaut

== See also ==
- Glazkov culture, ancient Siberian culture
