= 2021 Russian election protests =

Series of protests in Russia beginning in September 2021

- Part of opposition to Vladimir Putin in Russia
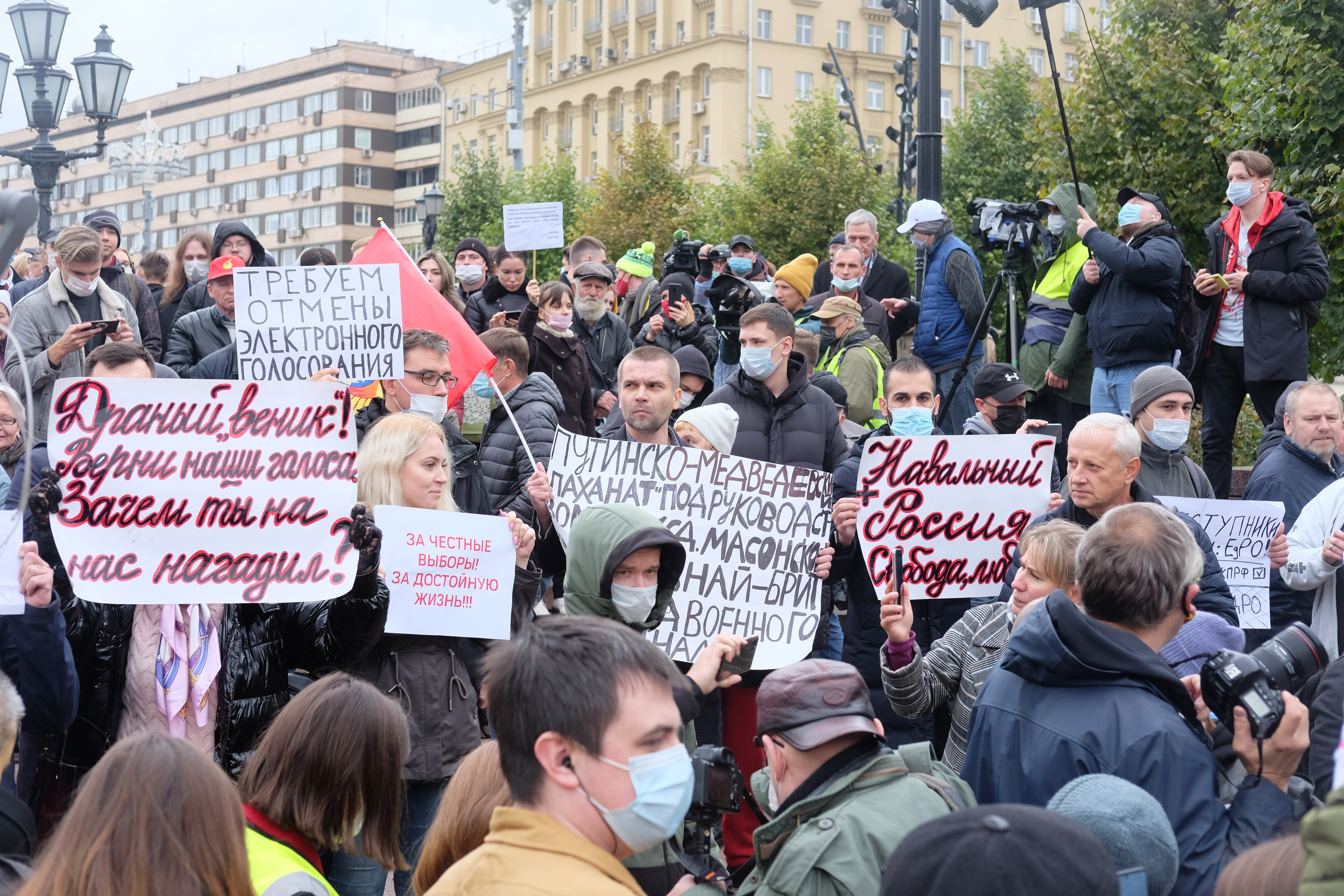
- A demonstration at the Pushkinskaya Square, Moscow, on 25 September 2021.
- Date: 20 September 2021 – late October 2021
- Location: Russia
- Caused by: Dissatisfaction with the results of elections to the State Duma, in particular electronic voting; Suspicions of election fraud in favor of United Russia
- Goals: Cancellation of electronic voting (DEG) results in Moscow; Revision of the results of the 2021 Russian legislative election; Criminal proceedings against Alexey Venediktov
- Methods: Protests; Demonstrations; Processions; Picketing; Internet activism
- Status: Ended

Parties
Communist Party of the Russian Federation; Leninist Komsomol; Movement in Support of the Army; Allied CPRF social and political organizations and movements; Left Front; For a New Socialism; Union of Soviet Officers; Revolutionary Workers' Party; Russian Socialist Movement; The Other Russia; Smart Voting	(Russia) Government; Ministry of Internal Affairs; Police; Central Election Commission; Government of Moscow; Moscow Police; Far-right groups Supported by United Russia; Liberal Democratic Party of Russia

Lead figures
Valery Rashkin; Nikolai Bondarenko; Mikhail Lobanov; Sergei Udaltsov; Nikolay Platoshkin Leonid Volkov	Vladimir Putin (Russia) Ella Pamfilova (Russia) Alexei Venediktov Sergey Shoygu; Vladimir Zhirinovsky

Number
25 September; Thousands of protesters (according to opposition); 400 people (according to the MVD)	

Casualties
- Arrested: 100 detainees

The 2021 Russian election protests, also known as the "For Fair Elections" protests, began in September 2021 due to alleged large-scale electoral fraud of the 2021 Russian legislative election.

== Chronology ==
On the night of September 20, the day after the end of the 2021 Russian legislative election, Valery Rashkin, the head of the Moscow City Committee of the Communist Party of the Russian Federation (CPRF), organized a protest against fraud in the format of a meeting with a deputy. At least 200 people took part in the action, including the losing opposition candidates Mikhail Lobanov, Denis Parfenov, Sergei Obukhov, Mikhail Tarantsov, and Marina Litvinovich; the latter also made slogans in support of Alexei Navalny, who is in prison. Rashkin promised that street actions would take place every week until the results of remote electronic voting are canceled.

On 25 September, protests continued in Moscow, Saratov, Yekaterinburg, Ufa, Volgograd, and other cities of the country. The day before the rally, the police cordoned off the building of the Moscow City Committee of the CPRF, and detained a number of communists, including the coordinator of the Left Front Sergei Udaltsov. The police used propaganda machines against the protesters, trying to drown out the speakers' speeches with loud music.

CPRF leader Gennady Zyuganov did not come to the protest, as he was meeting with Russian president Vladimir Putin at that time, Meduza's sources in the Presidential Administration and the CPRF claim that he raised the issue of canceling the results of remote electronic voting in Moscow to Anton Vaino, Sergey Kiriyenko, and Sergey Sobyanin, but they made it clear that no one would do this, after which Zyuganov is trying to achieve a more favorable distribution of leadership positions for the CPRF in the new convocation of the State Duma.

On 28 September, the police came to the lawyers of the CPRF who were going to file lawsuits appealing the results of the DEG. The Kremlin said it was not aware of this.

The police also blocked the reception of the State Duma deputy from the CPRF Ivan Melnikov, who called these actions a criminal offense and said that he had filed an appeal to the head of the Ministry of Internal Affairs Kolokoltsev.

On 29 September, in protest against the results of the DEG and repressions against the participants of the protests, the Moscow City Duma deputies from the CPRF decided to boycott the session.

== Reaction ==
Leonid Volkov, an associate of the opposition leader Alexei Navalny, said that thanks to the protests the CPRF returned the status of an opposition party. At a meeting with Putin, far-right LDPR leader Vladimir Zhirinovsky condemned the protests, calling them a "riot".

== Aftermath ==
Dozens of protesters were brought to administrative responsibility and arrested.
