= Irina Filatova =

Russian politician (born 1978)

Irina Filatova MP
- Ирина Филатова
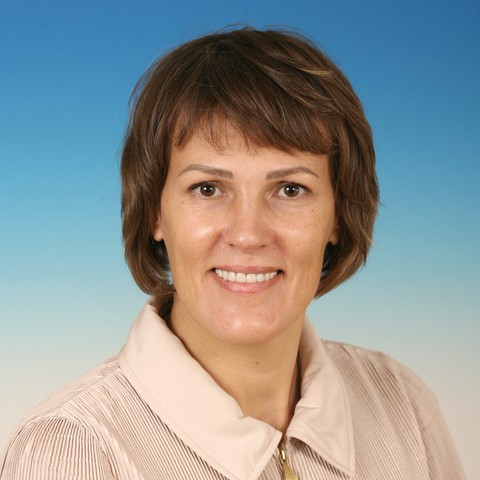

Member of the State Duma (Party List Seat)
- Incumbent
- Assumed office 12 October 2021

Personal details
- Born: 8 August 1978 (age 48) Novosibirsk, RSFSR, USSR
- Party: Communist Party of the Russian Federation
- Education: Siberian Academy of Public Administration
- Occupation: Lawyer

Irina Anatolievna Filatova (Russian: Ирина Анатольевна Филатова; born 8 August 1978, Novosibirsk) is a Russian political figure and a deputy of the 8th State Duma.

After graduating from the Siberian Academy of Public Administration, Filatova became a Russian Federal Bar Association member. She led a private law practice specializing in civil law relations. In 2007, she joined the Communist Party of the Russian Federation. In 2008, she became a member of the Youth Public Chamber of Russia. From 2011 to 2018, she was an advisor to the deputy of the 6th and 7th State Dumas Yury Afonin. From 2018 to 2021, she worked as an advisor on legal questions to Gennady Zyuganov. Since September 2021, she has served as deputy of the 8th State Duma.

== Family ==
She has two children.

== Sanctions ==
She was sanctioned by the Government of the United Kingdom in 2022, as retribution for the ongoing Russo-Ukrainian War.
