= Valery Rashkin =

Russian politician

- Валерий Рашкин
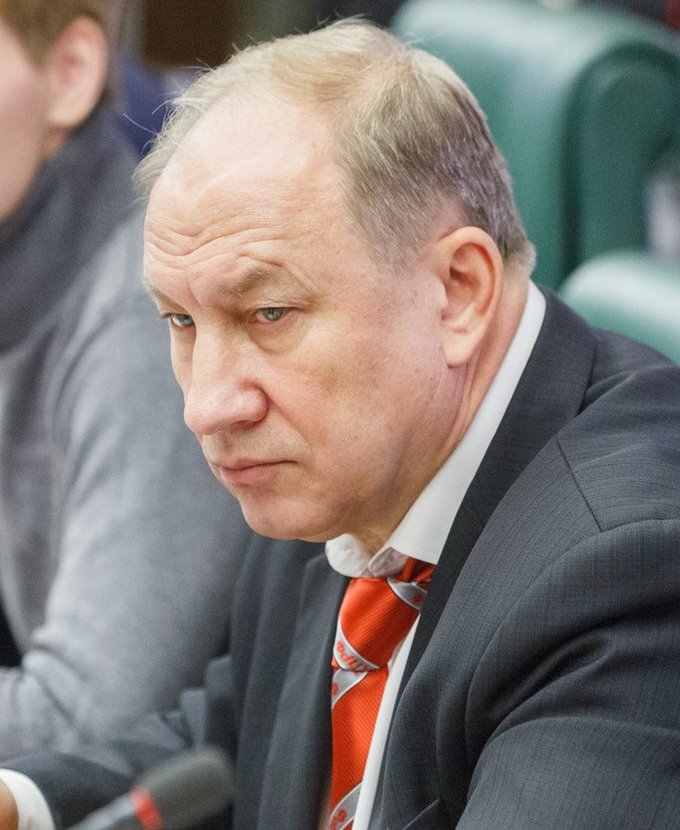
- Rashkin in 2014

Member of the State Duma (Party List Seat)
- In office 29 December 2003 – 25 May 2022
- Succeeded by: Anastasia Udaltsova

Member of the State Duma for Saratov Oblast
- In office 18 January 2000 – 29 December 2003
- Preceded by: Boris Gromov
- Succeeded by: Vladislav Tretiak
- Constituency: Saratov (No. 158)

Personal details
- Born: 14 March 1955 (age 71) Zhilino, Nemansky District, Kaliningrad Oblast, Russian SFSR, Soviet Union
- Party: CPRF
- Spouse: Natalya Petrovna Rashkina
- Children: Vladimir; Andrey
- Education: Saratov Polytechnic Institute
- Occupation: mechanical engineer

Valery Fyodorovich Rashkin (Russian: Вале́рий Фёдорович Ра́шкин; born 14 March 1955) is a Russian politician who was a deputy for the Communist Party in the State Duma in 2000–2022. From March 2003 to April 2021, he was a member of the Presidium of the party's Central Committee.

== Biography ==
=== Early life ===
Valery Rashkin was born on 14 March 1955 in the village of Zhilino, Nemansky District, Kaliningrad Oblast, in a large family of collective farmers. In 1977, he received a diploma in mechanical engineering at the Faculty of Electronic Engineering and Instrumentation of the Saratov Polytechnic Institute and was sent to work at the local production association "Corpus". Rashkin worked in there for 17 years, having proceeded from a process engineer to the head of the technological bureau and the chief dispatcher.

=== Start of the political career ===
Valery Rashkin joined the Communist Party of the Soviet Union in 1983. From 1988 to 1990, he was the secretary of the party committee in the Corpus production association, where he worked. He did not leave the party, and after the collapse of the USSR he moved to the Communist Party of the Russian Federation. From 1993 to 2011, Rashkin was the first secretary of the Saratov Regional Committee of the Communist Party.

In 1990, he was elected to the Saratov City Council of People's Deputies. In 1993, Rashkin was included in the Communist Party federal list in the elections to the 1st State Duma, but dropped out of it before the registration of candidates. In the elections to the 1st Saratov Oblast Duma in 1994, he headed the list of the local electoral bloc "For Democracy." He was elected one of the two deputy chairmen of the Duma.

=== Member of parliament ===
In December 1999, Rashkin was on the CPRF's list in the elections to the 3rd State Duma, listed second in the Volga-Caspian regional group. He also ran in Saratov constituency. Rashkin received 31.66% of the vote, having more than doubled the result of his closest rival Vyacheslav Maltsev with 14.78%.

In January 2000, Rashkin was nominated for the Governor of Saratov Oblast. His campaign was accompanied by allegations of links to organized crime, untimely campaigning and voter bribery. Rashkin himself and the Communist Party representatives accused the incumbent governor and his administration in initiating the "campaign of slander". Rashkin was not on the ballot, since the regional election commission declared invalid 3,000 signatures in support of his candidacy, about 25% of its total number. In 2003 Rashkin was elected to the 4th State Duma by CPRF party list. In Saratov constituency he was defeated by former ice hockey player Vladislav Tretiak.

In the summer of 2010, after the dissolution of the bureau of the Moscow City Committee of the Communist Party, he was appointed head of the Organizing Committee for convening a conference of the Moscow City Committee. On 18 December 2010 he was elected first secretary of the Moscow City Committee. In 2013 Rashkin became deputy chairman of the party's Central Committee. In the 6th State Duma (2011–16) he was deputy chairman of the committee for nationalities. In 2016 he lost the election in Lyublino constituency to TV presenter Pyotr Tolstoy. After passing by party list he continued his work in the committee for nationalities of the 7th State Duma.

In the elections to the 8th State Duma, CPRF nominated Valery Rashkin in Babushkinsky constituency of Moscow. His main rival was the United Russia candidate, TV presenter Timofey Bazhenov. On 15 September 2021 Alexei Navalny's team included Rashkin in the list of candidates, supported by the Smart Voting campaign. As five years before, Rashkin lost the constituency to pro-government candidate, but he entered the new Duma on the party list. Rashkin was one of the organizers of protests against electoral fraud, having held the first rally on Pushkin Square in Moscow on the night of 20 September.

== Views ==
=== Activity in the Duma ===
From 1999 to 2019, as a deputy of the State Duma, Valery Rashkin co-authored 197 legislative initiatives and amendments to draft federal laws. In October 2014 he submitted a bill prohibiting government officials and their family members from owning property abroad.

=== Rashkin's lists ===
The phrase "Rashkin's list" was repeatedly used by Rashkin himself and the media meaning lists of parliamentarians and officials who were accused by him of corruption and violation of the law. In November 2006, at a meeting of the State Duma, Rashkin accused United Russia of corruption, referring to the fact that most of the officials prosecuted for it were members of that party. After a complaint from United Russia deputies, the Duma Ethics Commission asked Rashkin to provide evidence. He planned to refer to the list of 297 prosecuted MPs and heads of municipalities, which he received from the Prosecutor General's Office in June 2006. The ethics commission found no indication of party affiliation in the cases; it considered Rashkin's statements inadmissible and deprived him of the right of speech during the Duma meetings for the next month. In January 2007, Rashkin presented a new list, which included 107 convicts and suspects. In a commentary to Novaya Gazeta, the head of the Duma Ethics Commission Gennady Raikov noted that out of 297 persons listed, only 78 were prosecuted for crimes that could be classified as corruption, 61 people were convicted, but all of them were non-partisan.

=== Ukrainian crisis ===
Euromaidan and the ensuing political crisis in Ukraine were regarded by Rashkin as the fascists' rise to power, caused by poverty, unemployment and corruption. He called on the Russian authorities to apply sanctions to the new Ukrainian leadership. In March 2014, Rashkin supported the annexation of Crimea by the Russian Federation. The politician also called for the use of Russian special services to kill Ukrainian nationalists Oleksandr Muzychko and Dmytro Yarosh. In February 2015, Rashkin was included on the list of persons whom the European Union considers responsible for destabilizing the situation in Eastern Ukraine.

=== Sanctions ===
Rashkin was sanctioned by the United Kingdom government in 2015 in relation to the Russo-Ukrainian War.

== Controversies ==
In December 2009, the Prosecutor General's Office sent an official warning to Rashkin following his controversial statements about the current government (on the October Revolution anniversary rally in Saratov Rashkin said that "blood must wash away this shame they have imposed on us [after 1991]"). His words were condemned by Communist party leader Gennady Zyuganov and Saratov regional branch of the CPRF. Then-secretary of United Russia's general council Vyacheslav Volodin, who was mentioned in Rashkin's speech, asked the court to oblige Rashkin to pay 5 million rubles in compensation for moral damage. Leninsky district court of Saratov reduced the amount of compensation to one million, which Rashkin paid with 60 kilograms of low-value coins.

In November 2012, Rashkin provoked a scandal, posting on Twitter about his wish to use Russian president Vladimir Putin as a target in a shooting tournament among State Duma members. After receiving harsh criticism, Rashkin said that he meant a photo of the president, that his post was a joke, that beating mannequins with politicians' portraits is a Japanese tradition.

In January 2016, Novaya Gazeta published the research of the academic degrees of the 6th State Duma members, made by Dissernet community. Rashkin's doctoral dissertation was classified as a "phantom" one, since neither the original nor its abstract were found in the RSL or NLR. Three years later Rashkin said that the degree was actually awarded by a public organization called the "Academy of Social Sciences".

In April 2016, member of the State Duma from LDPR Mikhail Degtyaryov accused top Moscow communists Valery Rashkin, Vladimir Rodin and Andrey Klychkov of espionage and high treason, citing a report by Russia-1 TV channel, which claimed that the CPRF city committee cooperated with Alexei Navalny.

=== Criminal prosecution ===
In October 2021, Valery Rashkin was accused of illegal hunting. According to the Committee for Hunting and Fishery of Saratov Oblast, on the night of 29 October, a cut elk carcass and cutting tools were found in the trunk of Rashkin's car in Lysogorsky District. Rashkin said that the "almost cut" elk was found by him in the forest. He called the incident a provocation by the authorities. CPRF's press secretary Alexander Yushchenko noted that Rashkin had never been fond of hunting and said that the Communist Party considers this event "another attack" on the MP. The article 258 of the Russian Criminal Code provides imprisonment for up to two years. Since Rashkin has parliamentary immunity, law enforcement agencies were able to take the case to court and bring charges only if the State Duma authorized the prosecution. State Duma authorized it on 25 November 2021. On 22 April 2022, Rashkin was convicted by the Kalininsky District, Saratov Oblast court of illegal hunting and given a 3-year suspended sentence with a 2-year probation.

== Personal life ==
Valery Rashkin is married to Natalya Petrovna Rashkina (born 1952), who works as a psychologist in a kindergarten. The couple has two sons: Vladimir (born 1979) and Andrey (born 1982). Both are graduates of the Saratov State Technical University. Andrey Rashkin works as the head of the information security department of Russia Today. Beyond politics, Rashkin is a master of mountaineering and has earned several sports awards, reflecting his active involvement in athletics.
