= Babushkinsky constituency =

Russian legislative constituency

Babushkinsky single-member constituency
- Constituency of the Russian State Duma

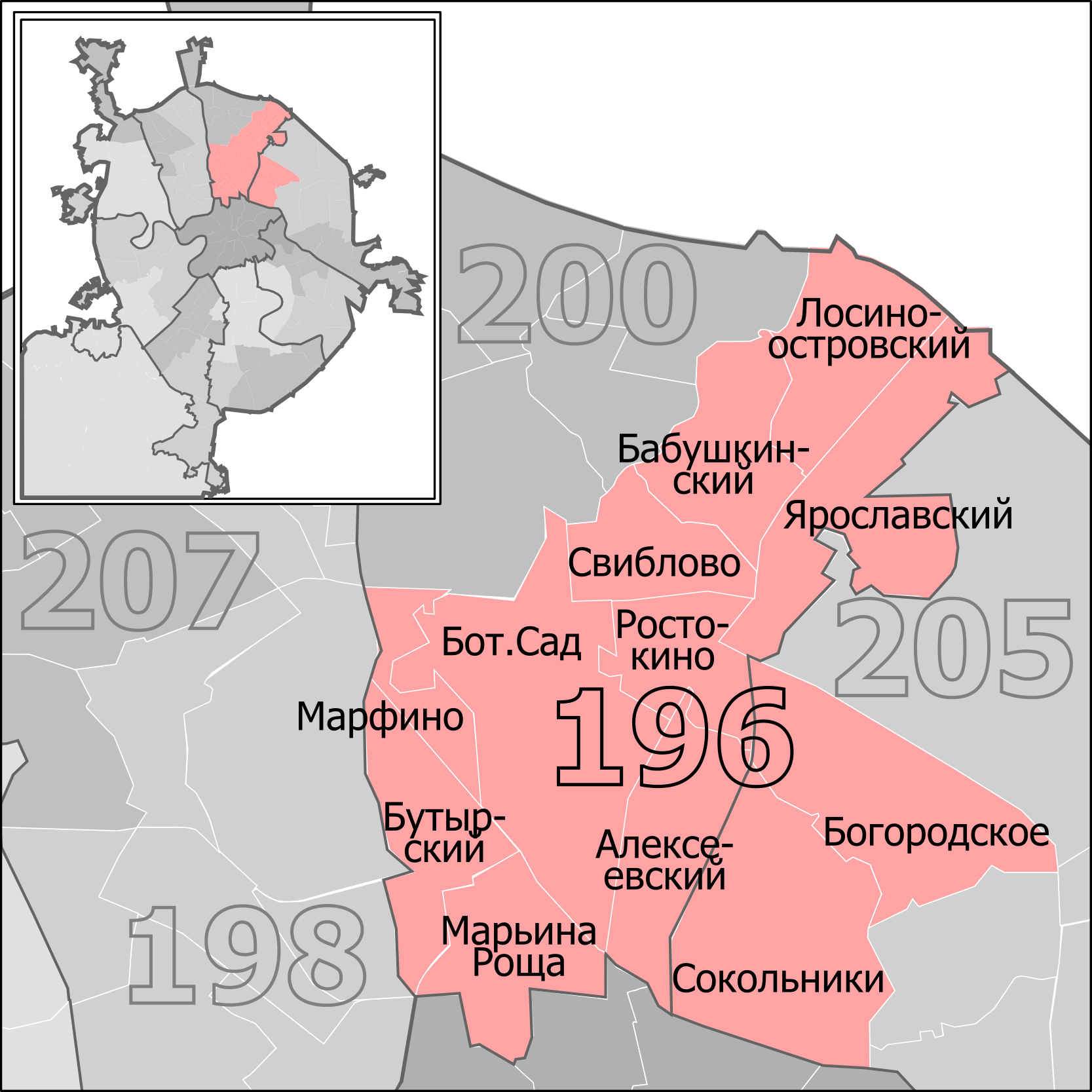
- Constituency boundaries since 2016
- Deputy: Vladislav Gusev; United Russia
- Federal subject: Moscow
- Districts: Eastern AO (Bogorodskoye, Sokolniki), North-Eastern AO (Alekseyevsky, Babushkinsky, Butyrsky, Losinoostrovsky, Marfino, Maryina Roshcha, Ostankinsky, Rostokino, Sviblovo, Yaroslavsky)
- Voters: 520,310 (2026)

The Babushkinsky constituency (No.195 (Note: No.191 in 1993-1995, No.192 in 1995-2007, No.196 in 2016–2026)) is a Russian legislative constituency in Moscow. The constituency covers residential areas in North-Eastern Moscow and partly in Eastern Moscow.

The constituency has been represented since 2026 by United Russia deputy Vladislav Gusev, retired Rosgvardiya officer and nonprofit executive, who won the open seat, succeeding one-term United Russia incumbent Timofey Bazhenov.

== Boundaries ==
1993–1995: North-Eastern Administrative Okrug (Alekseyevsky District, Babushkinsky District, Losinoostrovsky District, Maryina Roshcha District, Ostankinsky District, Rostokino District, Severnoye Medvedkovo District, Sviblovo District, Yaroslavsky District)
The constituency covered residential areas in eastern part of North-Eastern Moscow.

1995–2007: Eastern Administrative Okrug (Sokolniki), North-Eastern Administrative Okrug (Alekseyevsky District, Babushkinsky District, Butyrsky District, Losinoostrovsky District, Marfino District, Maryina Roshcha District, Ostankinsky District, Rostokino District, Sviblovo District, Yaroslavsky District)
After the 1995 redistricting the constituency was slightly altered, losing Severnoye Medvedkovo District to Medvedkovo constituency and gaining Sokolniki District in inner Eastern Moscow from Preobrazhensky constituency.

2016–present: Eastern Administrative Okrug (Bogorodskoye District, Sokolniki District), North-Eastern Administrative Okrug (Alekseyevsky District, Babushkinsky District, Butyrsky District, Losinoostrovsky District, Marfino District, Maryina Roshcha District, Ostankinsky District, Rostokino District, Sviblovo District, Yaroslavsky District)
The constituency was re-created for the 2016 election and retained all of its former territory as well as gained Bogorodskoye District from Preobrazhensky constituency.

== Members elected ==
Election	Member	Party
1993	Yuly Nisnevich	Choice of Russia
1995	Telman Gdlyan	Independent
1999	Sergey Shirokov	Fatherland – All Russia
2003	Sergey Shirokov	United Russia
2007	Proportional representation - no election by constituency	
2011	Proportional representation - no election by constituency	
2016	Ivan Teterin	United Russia
2021	Timofey Bazhenov	United Russia
2026	Vladislav Gusev	United Russia

== Election results ==
=== 1993 ===
Summary of the 12 December 1993 Russian legislative election in the Babushkinsky constituency
Candidate	Party	Votes	%
Yuly Nisnevich	Choice of Russia	36,413	14.58%
Nina Milyukova	Independent	–	11.63%
Aleksandr Filatov	Liberal Democratic Party	–	–
Sergey Komkov	Independent	–	–
Boris Kondrashov	Independent	–	–
Viktor Mikhnevich	Communist Party	–	–
Vladimir Novikov	Independent	–	–
Artyom Smolyanoy	Future of Russia–New Names	–	–
Nikolay Troshkin	Yavlinsky–Boldyrev–Lukin	–	–
Vladimir Tumanov	Party of Russian Unity and Accord	–	–
Total		249,768	100%

=== 1995 ===
Summary of the 17 December 1995 Russian legislative election in the Babushkinsky constituency
Candidate	Party	Votes	%
Telman Gdlyan	Independent	63,991	21.32%
Yuly Nisnevich (incumbent)	Democratic Choice of Russia – United Democrats	34,063	11.35%
Aleksey Shishkov	Independent	28,603	9.53%
Yevgeny Zaikin	Independent	24,189	8.06%
Aleksandr Porfirov	Pamfilova–Gurov–Lysenko	20,402	6.80%
Gennady Shalygin	Yabloko	20,167	6.72%
Valeriya Novodvorskaya	Party of Economic Freedom	11,240	3.74%
Nikolay Domashenkov	Independent	7,761	2.59%
Larisa Dementyeva	Independent	7,468	2.49%
Konstantin Kalachev	Beer Lovers Party	6,859	2.28%
Valery Yakovlev	Independent	6,850	2.28%
Mikhail Astafyev	Zemsky Sobor	5,736	1.91%
Aleksandr Artsibashev	Agrarian Party	4,763	1.59%
Anatoly Panov	Liberal Democratic Party	4,277	1.42%
Aleksandr Zholkov	Independent	4,238	1.41%
Andrey Lumpov	Faith, Work, Conscience	3,433	1.14%
Larisa Babukh	Education - Future of Russia	2,965	0.99%
Galina Skorokhodova	Independent	2,453	0.82%
Vladimir Voronin	Independent	2,051	0.68%
Orest Kuznetsov	Independent	973	0.32%
Yury Gorodetsky	Independent	789	0.26%
Sergey Kanayev	Transformation of the Fatherland	787	0.26%
Pavel Kudyukin	Social Democrats	654	0.22%
against all		30,065	10.01%
Total		300,201	100%

=== 1999 ===
Summary of the 19 December 1999 Russian legislative election in the Babushkinsky constituency
Candidate	Party	Votes	%
Sergey Shirokov	Fatherland – All Russia	110,153	36.99%
Yuly Nisnevich	Union of Right Forces	31,961	10.73%
Aleksandr Droban	Independent	22,364	7.51%
Valery Shaposhnikov	Andrey Nikolayev and Svyatoslav Fyodorov Bloc	16,569	5.56%
Irina Volkova	Independent	16,025	5.38%
Anna Alyoshina	Independent	10,430	3.50%
Anatoly Firsov	Russian Socialist Party	9,777	3.28%
Nikolay Morozov	Independent	8,347	2.80%
Vladimir Gorshkov	Independent	7,639	2.57%
Valery Korobeynikov	Spiritual Heritage	3,995	1.34%
against all		51,947	17.44%
Total		297,806	100%

=== 2003 ===
Summary of the 7 December 2003 Russian legislative election in the Babushkinsky constituency
Candidate	Party	Votes	%
Sergey Shirokov (incumbent)	United Russia	81,561	31.42%
Sergey Mitrokhin	Yabloko	75,973	29.27%
Andrey Shirokov	Party of Russia's Rebirth-Russian Party of Life	25,921	9.99%
Maksim Suraykin	Communist Party	21,966	8.46%
against all		48,391	18.64%
Total		260,628	100%

=== 2016 ===
Summary of the 18 September 2016 Russian legislative election in the Babushkinsky constituency
Candidate	Party	Votes	%
Ivan Teterin	United Russia	58,902	34.58%
Sergey Mitrokhin	Yabloko	20,997	12.33%
Aleksandr Potapov	Communist Party	20,348	11.95%
Nikolay Lyaskin	People's Freedom Party	13,251	7.78%
Oleg Belyayev	A Just Russia	13,182	7.74%
Aleksandr Sapronov	Liberal Democratic Party	12,441	7.30%
Marina Drumova	The Greens	7,472	4.39%
Yanis Yuksha	Rodina	6,729	3.95%
Yury Gubanov	Communists of Russia	4,959	2.91%
Vladimir Lakeyev	Independent	2,450	1.44%
Nikolay Skorik	Patriots of Russia	2,334	1.37%
Oleg Cherdakov	Civilian Power	1,180	0.69%
Total		171,192	100%

=== 2021 ===
Results by district: Timofey Bazhenov: 30–40% 40–50%; Valery Rashkin: 30–40%

Summary of the 17-19 September 2021 Russian legislative election in the Babushkinsky constituency
Candidate	Party	Votes	%
Timofey Bazhenov	United Russia	92,522	38.40%
Valery Rashkin	Communist Party	59,086	24.53%
Georgy Fyodorov	A Just Russia — For Truth	15,025	6.24%
Viktoria Mironova	Russian Party of Freedom and Justice	12,683	5.26%
Aleksey Rvachev	New People	11,645	4.83%
Aleksey Kryukov	Liberal Democratic Party	10,241	4.25%
Kirill Yankov	Yabloko	9,175	3.81%
Sergey Malinkovich	Communists of Russia	6,700	2.78%
Elvira Vikhareva	Party of Growth	5,777	2.40%
Anton Tarasov	The Greens	4,796	1.99%
Yelena Strelnikova	Green Alternative	4,713	1.96%
Yelena Ivanova	Civic Platform	2,377	0.99%
Total		240,912	100%

=== 2026 ===
Summary of the 18-20 September 2026 Russian legislative election in the Babushkinsky constituency
Candidate	Party	Votes	%
Vladislav Gusev	United Russia	118,515	44.54%
Georgy Fyodorov	Communist Party	39,615	14.89%
Yury Omelchenko	New People	33,555	12.61%
Aleksandr Khankeyev	Liberal Democratic Party	25,658	9.64%
Yulia Kuznetsova	The Greens	24,952	9.38%
Tatyana Fokina	A Just Russia	22,305	8.38%
Total		266,107	100%
