= Bazhenov =

Bazhenov (Russian: Баженов; masculine) is a Russian surname. Its feminine form is Bazhenova (Russian: Баженова)

Notable people with the surname include:

== Bazhenov ==
- Alexandre Bazhenov (born 1981), Russian racing cyclist
- Evgeny Bazhenov (also known as BadComedian, born 1991), YouTuber and film critic
- Nikita Bazhenov (born 1985), Russian footballer
- Timofey Bazhenov (born 1976), Russian journalist and politician
- Vasili Bazhenov (1737–1799), (c. 1737–1799), Russian neoclassical architect, graphic artist, architectural theorist and educator
- Viktor Bazhenov (born 1946), Soviet fencer
- Vsevolod Bazhenov (1909–1986), Soviet Russian painter

== Bazhenova ==
- Nadezhda Bazhenova (born 1978), Russian athlete and triple-jumper

== Other uses ==
- Bazhenov Formation a geological formation in Siberia, Russia, which contains large reserves of unconventional oil

== See also ==
- Bazhenovo, name of some rural localities (selos) in Bashkortostan, Russia
