= Alexeyevsky District, Moscow =

District in Moscow, Russia

Alexeyevsky District Алексеевский район (Russian)
- District
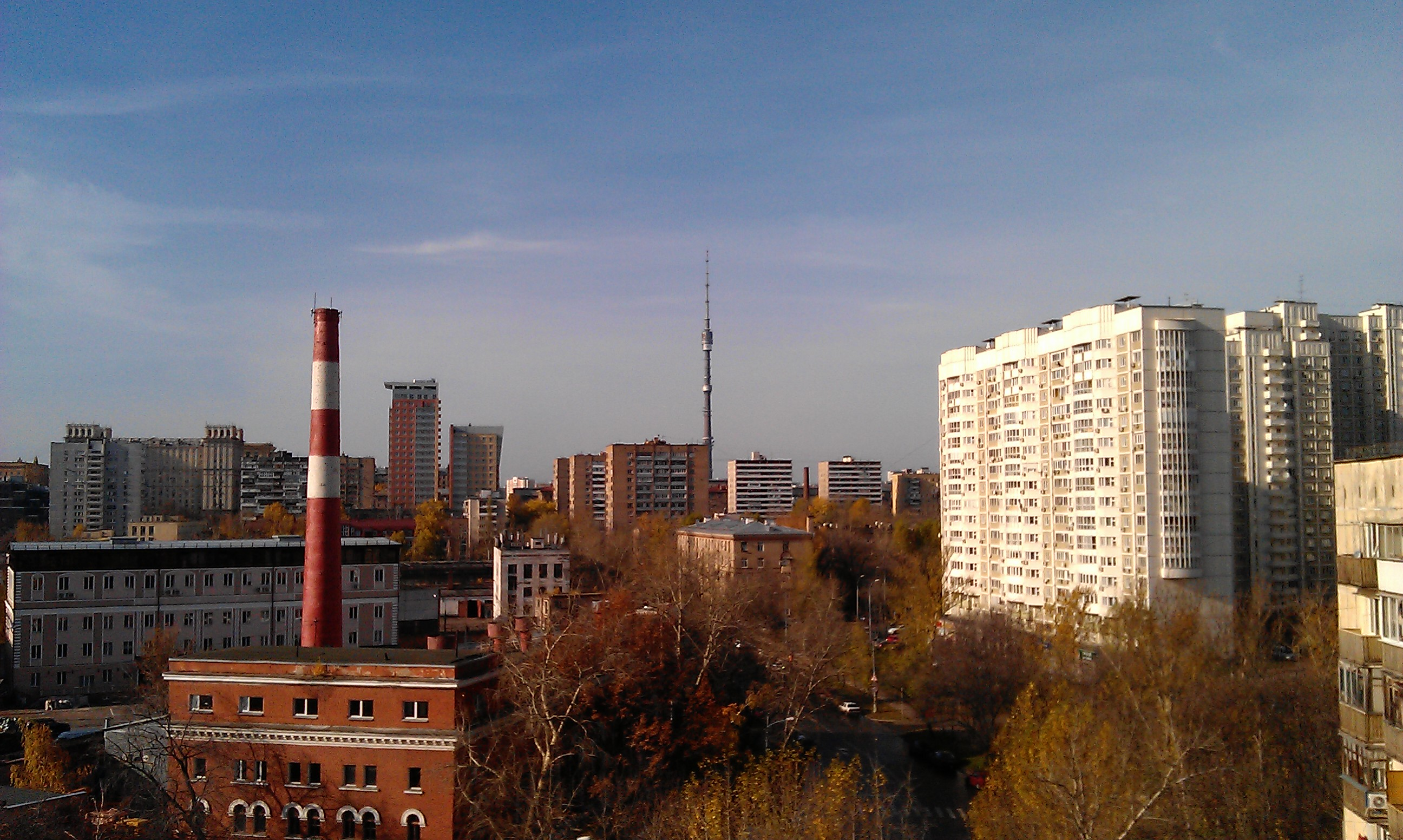
- Ostankinskaya tower, view from Malomoskovskaya street, Alexeyevsky District

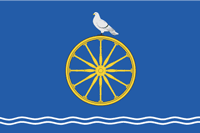
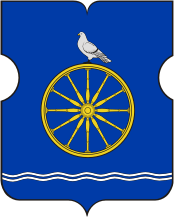
- Flag Coat of arms
- Location of Alexeyevsky District in Moscow (pre-2012 map)
- Coordinates: 55°49′N 37°39′E
- Country: Russia
- Federal subject: Federal city of Moscow

Area
  - Total: 5.2931 km^{2} (2.0437 sq mi)

Population (2010 Census)
  - Total: 78,421
  - Estimate (2013): 79,661
  - Density: 14,816/km^{2} (38,372/sq mi)

Municipal structure
  - Municipally incorporated as: Alexeyevsky Municipal Okrug
- Time zone: UTC+
- OKTMO ID: 45349000
- Website: http://alekseevsky.svao.mos.ru

Population of Alexeyevsky District
- 2010 Census: 78,421
- 2002 Census: 73,429

Alexeyevsky District (Russian: Алексе́евский райо́н) is a territorial division (a district, or raion) in North-Eastern Administrative Okrug, one of the 125 in the federal city of Moscow, Russia. It is located in the northeast of the federal city. The area of the district is 5.2931 square kilometers (2.0437 sq mi). As of the 2010 Census, the total population of the district was 78,421.

The district is named after the village of Alexeyevo, which existed on this site before urbanization. It is largely centered on Mira Avenue. The famous Worker and Kolkhoz Woman statue, as well as Cosmonauts Alley, are located in Alexeyevsky District. There are two metro stations are situated on Alexeyevsky District: VDNH and Alexeyevskaya.

As a municipal division, the district is incorporated as Alexeyevsky Municipal Okrug.

== Territory and borders ==
The boundary of the Alexeyevsky District runs along the axis of the Yauza River, then follows the eastern and southeastern borders of the right-of-way of the Yaroslavl direction of the Moscow Railway, the southwestern border of the right-of-way of the Mitykovskaya connecting railway branch of the Moscow Railway, and the axis of Prospekt Mira up to the Yauza River. The district is situated between the Rostokino District to the north, the Meshchansky and Krasnoselsky Districts to the south, the Ostankinsky District and Maryina Roshcha to the west, and the Sokolniki and Bogorodskoye Districts to the east.

The area of the district is 529 hectares.

== History ==
It is believed that the history of the settlement, later known as the village of Alexeyevskoye, dates back to the late 14th century. In any case, Grand Prince Vasily I Dmitriyevich, in his spiritual charter of 1407, lists the village of Alexeyevskaya among his estates and mentions that it previously belonged to the boyar Fyodor Andreyevich Sviblo. Later, the village came into the possession of the dyak (clerk) Andrei Yarlyk, who around 1456 transferred it to the Chudov Monastery. By the mid-16th century, the village was referred to as a "seltso" (small settlement); it is believed that it was then owned by Zakhar Vasilyevich Kopytov.

At the beginning of the 17th century, the settlement was part of the Vasilyevsky Stan of the Moscow Uyezd and was called the seltso "Kopytovo on the Retonka River" (later this tributary of the Yauza, and with it the village, came to be known as Kopytovka). The village, surrounded by dense forest, was traversed by the Bolshaya Troitskaya Road (from the early 19th century, the Yaroslavl Highway), which led to the Trinity-Sergius Lavra. According to the 1623 census book, the seltso was previously owned by the dumny dyak (senior clerk) Putilo Mikhailov. In 1621, Tsar Mikhail Fyodorovich granted Kopytovka as a pomestye (estate) to Prince D.T. Trubetskoy. The prince's widow, Anna Vasilyevna, built a stone church in Kopytovka "in the name of Alexey, the Man of God" (dismantled due to dilapidation in 1824); it is believed that the church was named so to please Tsar Alexey Mikhailovich. From 1647 onward, the settlement became known as the village of Alexeyevskoye.

The widow died without leaving an heir in 1662, after which Alexeyevskoye passed into the possession of the Palace Department. Alexey Mikhailovich built a travel palace here, which he used during his annual pilgrimages to the Trinity-Sergius Lavra. In 1667, a stable yard was constructed in the village, and in 1673–1674, a royal residence was erected. In 1680, already under Fyodor Alexeyevich, the construction of the Church of the Tikhvin Icon of the Mother of God was completed.

Today, the church is protected by the state as a valuable architectural monument. The Tikhvin Church is located on Tserkovnaya Gorka Street, is quite large, and can accommodate 3,000 people. The church has five side chapels and is one of the examples of Moscow Baroque, crowned with an elegant five-domed structure and adorned with white stone decorative carvings. The church has excellent acoustics; it houses an iconostasis from the mid-18th century, and in the refectory, there are iconostases from the 19th century. The wall paintings were executed in 1836 by D. Scotty and have been restored several times. To the west of the church is a refectory, which was connected to the wooden Travel Palace of the Tsar (no longer extant). In the 19th century, a small cemetery surrounded by a brick wall emerged around the church, which had become a parish church. Since 1962, the Patriarch of Moscow and All Russia has conducted divine liturgies in the Tikhvin Church during its patronal feasts—the feast day of St. Alexey, the Man of God, and the feast of the Tikhvin Icon of the Mother of God.

Peter I and his successors showed little interest in Alexeyevskoye and the royal residence located there, which gradually fell into decline. In the early 18th century, the village belonged to Prince A.D. Menshikov.

Between 1781 and 1804, the famous Mytishchi Water Supply System passed through the village of Alexeyevskoye, and a water intake station was built. In 1830, the Alexeyevskaya Water Pumping Station (named after V. V. Oldenborger) was constructed, which supplied water to a reservoir installed in the second (upper) tier of the Sukharev Tower; from there, water was distributed throughout the city.

In 1917, the village of Alexeyevskoye was incorporated into Moscow. It was merged with Rostokino to form the Alexeyevo-Rostokino subdistrict, which became part of the Sokolniki District. During the October armed uprising of 1917, it served as one of the Bolsheviks' food supply points. A trench was dug on the territory of the present-day district, and local workers handed over 119 rifles to the Bolsheviks. In the late 1920s and early 1930s, the Alexeyevsky Student Campus was built here (now replaced by sixteen-story student dormitories), along with the first multi-story residential buildings. From the 1960s onward, mass residential construction began in the district. From 1957 to 1964, the famous photojournalist Yakov Ryumkin lived in house 31 on the 3rd Proyezd of the Alexeyevsky Student Campus.
