= Aleksandr Kolpakidi =

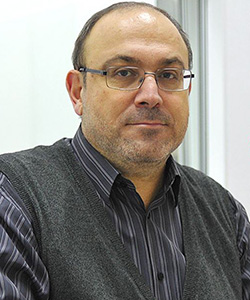
- Born: January 2, 1962; Sterlitamak
- Education: Saint Petersburg State University
- Occupations: Writer, screenwriter, political scientist, opinion writer, military historian, historian
- Employers: Peter the Great St. Petersburg Polytechnic University; Saint Petersburg Electrotechnical University

Aleksandr I. Kolpakidi (Russian: Александр Иванович Колпакиди; born 1962, in Tuapse) is a Russian writer and historian.

He graduated from the Saint Petersburg State University in 1983.

He taught at the Peter the Great St. Petersburg Polytechnic University and Saint Petersburg Electrotechnical University.

From 2003, he was the editor in chief of the publishing house at “Eksmo”.

He has published a number of books. He is the screenwriter of the films Африка – королева шпионажа (2012), "Красная графиня" советской разведки. История Рут фон Майенбург (2015).

Aleksandr Kolpakidi lives and works in Moscow. He campaigned for the Communist Party of the Russian Federation.

He is a critic of Andropov, and Nikolay Platoshkin.
