= Mikhail Lobanov =

Russian politician (born 1984)

- Михаил Лобанов
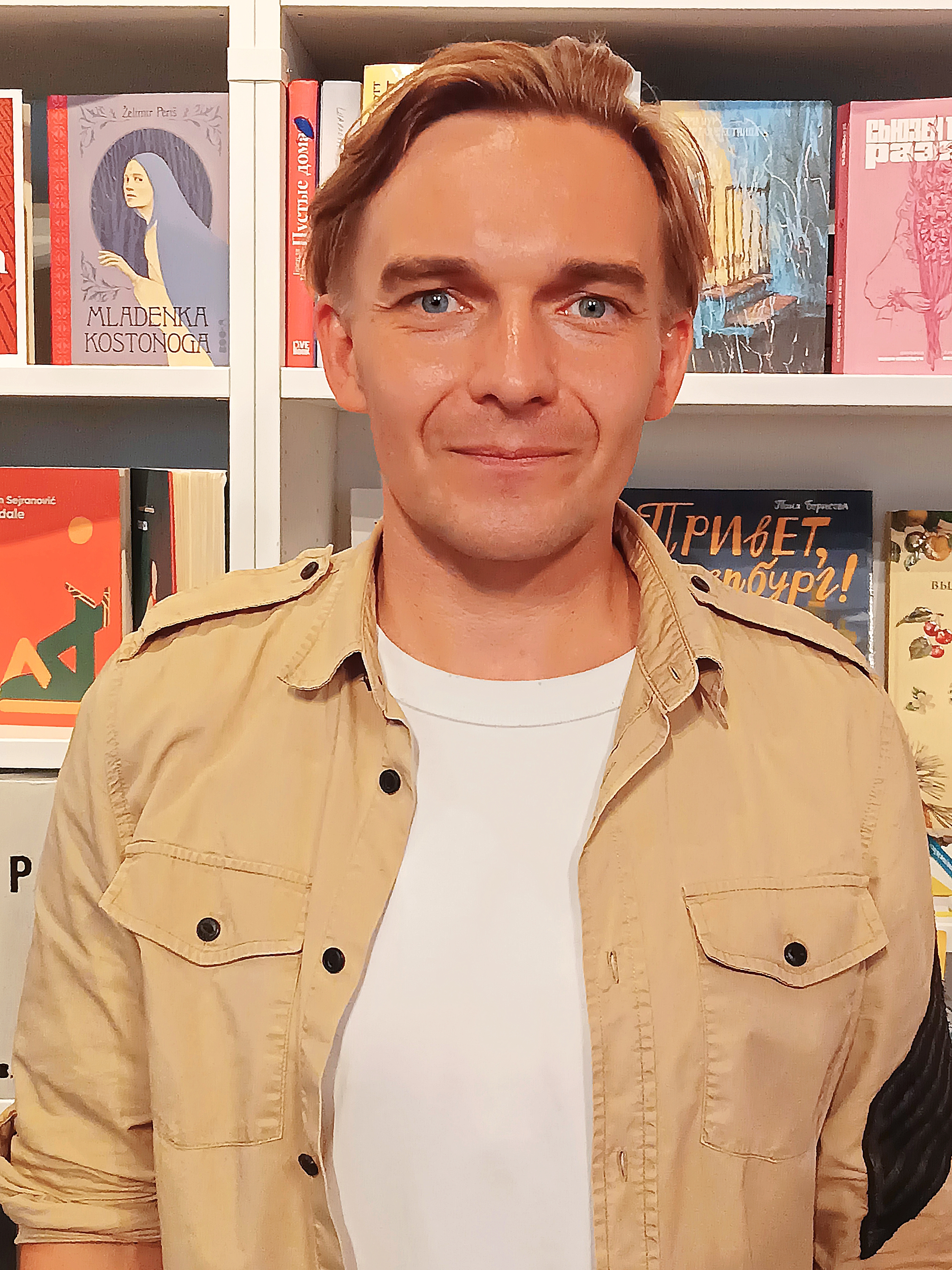
- Lobanov in 2025

Personal details
- Born: Mikhail Sergeyevich Lobanov; 24 February 1984 (age 42) Arkhangelsk, Russian SFSR, Soviet Union
- Party: Non-partisan
- Other political affiliations: CPRF (2021-present)(not a member of the party)
- Parent: Sergey Lobanov (father)
- Education: Moscow State University (2006)
- Occupation: Mathematician; Teacher; Politician
- Awards: Badge of Distinction "For Mentoring"

Mikhail Sergeyevich Lobanov (Russian: Михаил Сергеевич Лобанов; born 24 February 1984) is a Russian mathematician, left-wing politician, trade union activist, and former associate professor at Moscow State University.

== Biography ==
Mikhail Lobanov was born into a family of engineers: his father worked as a builder, and his mother was a garment manufacturing technologist. He graduated from Moscow State University with a degree in discrete mathematics in 2006. He was a Candidate of Physical and Mathematical Sciences since 2009 (the topic of his PhD thesis "On the relationship between algebraic immunity and nonlinearity of Boolean functions").

Since his student years, he participated in grassroots activism and the trade union movement (among other things, he personally supported the strike of workers at a cement plant in the city of Mikhaylov, Ryazan Oblast). A number of intra-university campaigns aimed at protecting the interests of students and teachers of Moscow State University are associated with his name.

In 2007, he organized a film club with his comrades at MSU, supported a group of dissatisfied students of the Faculty of Sociology (OD-Group). In 2009, he was among the founders and leaders of the "Initiative Group of students, graduate students and employees of Moscow State University", which arose from a successful campaign against the university administration's attempt to tighten the rules of admission to dormitories. Co-founder (in 2013) of the independent trade union "University Solidarity", member of the trade union committee at Moscow State University and the central council of the trade union association.

During the 2012 Russian protests, he was one of the organizers of scientific and educational columns at opposition marches. He is also known as a participant in urban protection and environmental actions (including the protection of historical buildings and green areas from construction business) in the Ramenka district, where the main complex of MSU is located. He, like several other representatives of the scientific and pedagogical community, criticized and protested against the Law on Educational Activities.

For his public activities, he was under pressure from the administration; in 2013 and 2018, they attempted to dismiss him from the university, but thanks to the solidarity campaign, he was reinstated as a teacher of the Faculty of Mechanics and Mathematics of MSU.

Lobanov himself supported political prisoners, including fellow mathematicians Dmitry Bogatov and Azat Miftakhov, as well as members of the editorial board of the student magazine "DOXA".

In the municipal elections in Moscow in 2022, he supported such candidates as Konstantin Konkov, Arseniy Lytar, Denis Zhilin, Vladlena Mokrousova, Nikita Kozlov.

On 23 June 2023, the Russian government declared him a foreign agent, and the following July, he was fired from his post as docent of mechanics and mathematics at the Moscow State University. He announced that he was planning to leave Russia.

== 2021 legislative election ==
Despite not being a member of the Communist Party of the Russian Federation, Lobanov received that party's endorsement, as well as support from Smart Voting, as a candidate for the State Duma of the Russian Federation in the 197th Kuntsevo single-mandate constituency. His main competitor was the candidate from the Moscow mayor's office, the TV presenter Yevgeny Popov, who was nominated by United Russia party and endorsed by Mayor Sergey Sobyanin.

According to the results of voting in precincts, Lobanov comfortably led by a margin of more than 10,000 votes, however, after the publication of the results of remote electronic voting (DEG), he lost to Popov. According to official data, he received 72,805 votes (31.65%), the best indicator among all opposition candidates in Moscow districts.

Mikhail Lobanov did not recognize the results of the elections, urging other opposition candidates to join the fight for annulment of the results. Lobanov took part in the CPRF rally on Pushkinskaya Square on the night of September 20.

On September 23, in advance of a planned rally for September 25, police visited Lobanov as well as other protest leaders.

== Arrest ==
Mikhail Lobanov was arrested in the end of December 2022 and held in administrative detention for two weeks.

== Political views ==
Lobanov professes democratic socialism as his core ideology; among ideologically close non-Russian politicians, he names United States Senator Bernie Sanders and former leader of the British Labour Party Jeremy Corbyn. The key points of his electoral program in 2021, using the leitmotif of "fighting blatant economic and political inequality," were raising the minimum wage, increasing the progressive scale of taxation, increasing spending on education and science, canceling pension reform and lowering the retirement age, and protecting the environment. Lobanov's campaign was supported by independent trade unions (Confederation of Labour of Russia) and a number of left-wing organizations (Russian Socialist Movement, Marxist Tendency, Union of Democratic Socialists and others).

Mikhail Lobanov opposes the Russian invasion of Ukraine. On 7 June 2022 he was arrested by the police for anti-war banner «No War». On 24 June 2022, he was detained for fifteen days by Russian police and fined 40 000 rubles for having made statements on social media opposing the 2022 Russian invasion of Ukraine.

== Electoral history ==
2021 Russian legislative election (Kuntsevo constituency)
Candidate	Party	Votes	%
Yevgeny Popov	United Russia	80,894	35.17%
Mikhail Lobanov	Communist Party	72,805	31.65%
Aleksandr Tarnavsky	A Just Russia — For Truth	13,421	5.84%
Boris Balmont	New People	11,709	5.09%
Kirill Goncharov	Yabloko	11,648	5.06%
Pavel Ramensky	Liberal Democratic Party	10,475	4.55%
Darya Mitina	Communists of Russia	6,493	2.82%
Igor Glek	The Greens	5,473	2.38%
Vladislava Gorshkova	Green Alternative	5,436	2.36%
Aleksey Sobolev	Rodina	3,789	1.65%
Mikhail Menshikov	Party of Growth	3,604	1.57%
Total		230,007	100%
