= Nikolay Arefiev =

Russian politician (born 1949)

Nikolay Arefiev MP
- Николай Арефьев
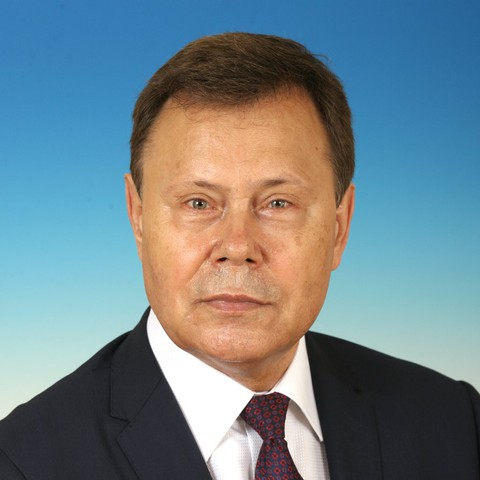
- official portrait, circa 2021

Member of the State Duma (Party List Seat)
- Incumbent
- Assumed office 21 December 2011
- In office 18 January 2000 – 29 December 2003

Personal details
- Born: 11 March 1949 (age 77) Chagan, Astrakhan Oblast, Russian SFSR, USSR
- Party: Communist Party of the Russian Federation
- Education: Astrakhan State Technical University; Saratov Higher Party School; HSE University

Nikolay Vasilievich Arefiev (Note: Also transliterated as Nikolai and Arefyev.) (Russian: Николай Васильевич Арефьев; born 11 March 1949 in Chagan, Kamyzyaksky District) is a Russian political figure and a deputy of the 8th State Duma.

From 1968 to 1970, he served at the Soviet Armed Forces. In 1979, he became a member of the Communist Party of the Soviet Union. From 1981 to 1985, he was an instructor, then head of a department of one of the district committees of the CPSU in Astrakhan. From 1987 to 1991, he was the first secretary of the Soviet district committee of the CPSU in Astrakhan. In 1993, he was appointed Secretary of the Astrakhan Regional Committee of the Communist Party of the Russian Federation. From 1995 to 1999, he was the deputy of the 2nd State Duma. From 1997 to 2010, he was the First Secretary of the Astrakhan Regional Committee of the Communist Party. In 1999 and 2003, he was re-elected for the 3rd State Duma. From 2006 to 2010, he was the deputy of the Duma of Astrakhan Oblast. In 2011, 2016, and 2021, he was re-elected for the 6th, 7th, and 8th State Dumas.

== Legislative Activity ==
From 1995 to 2019, during his tenure as a deputy of the State Duma of the 2nd, 3rd, 6th, and 7th convocations, he co-authored 164 legislative initiatives and amendments to federal law drafts.

== Sanctions ==
He was sanctioned by the UK government in 2022 in relation to the Russo-Ukrainian War.
