= Grachyovsky =

Grachyovsky (masculine), Grachyovskaya (feminine), or Grachyovskoye (neuter) may refer to:

- Grachyovsky District, name of several districts in Russia
- Grachyovsky (rural locality), a rural locality (a selo) in Kaluga Oblast, Russia
