= Ostankinsky District =

- District
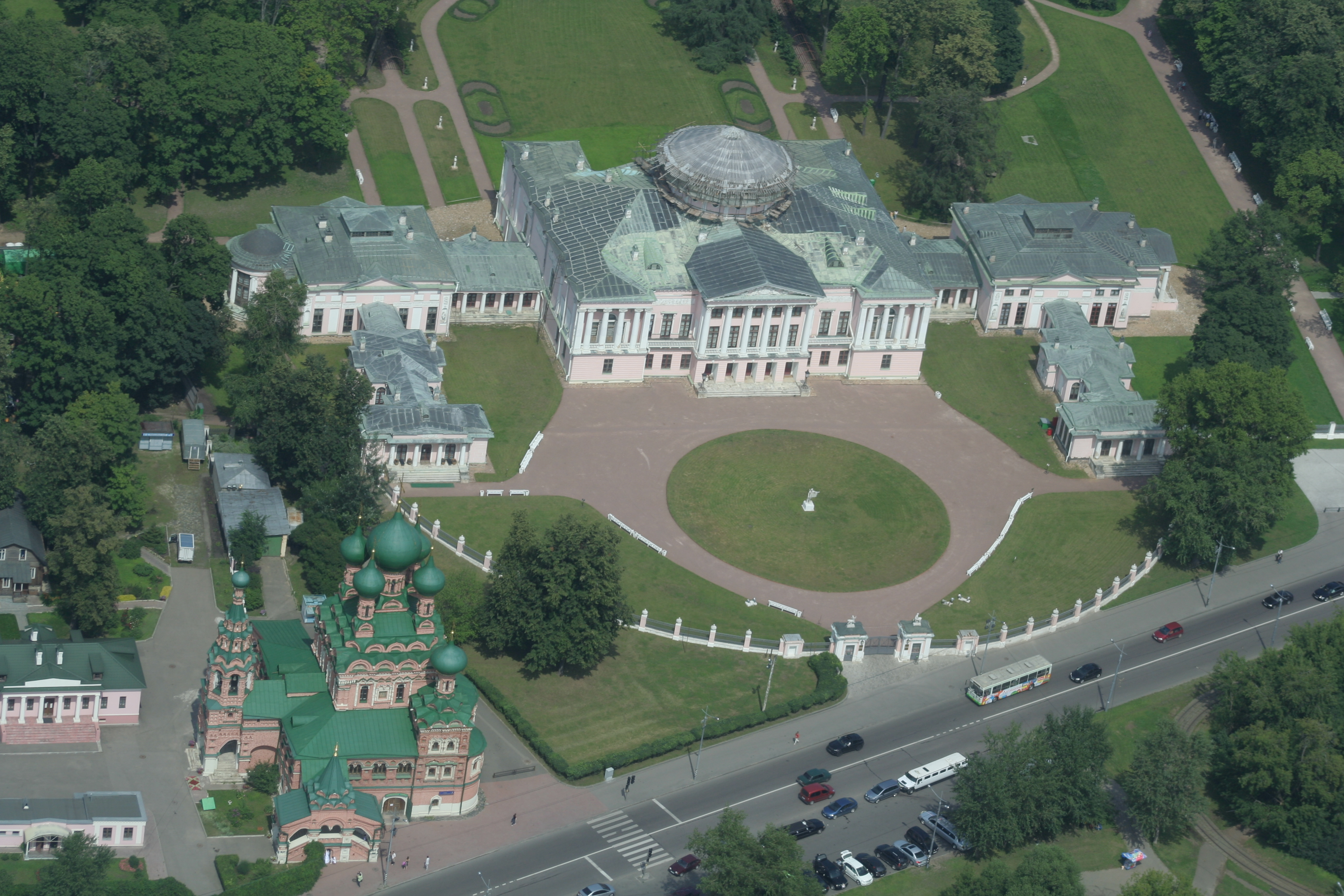
- Ostankino Palace, from the observation deck of the Ostankino Tower, Ostankinsky District

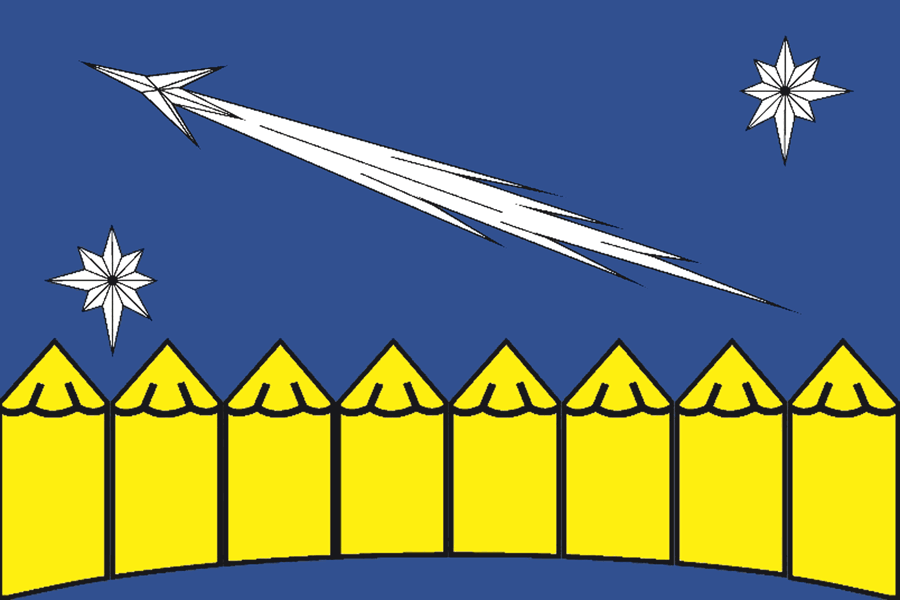
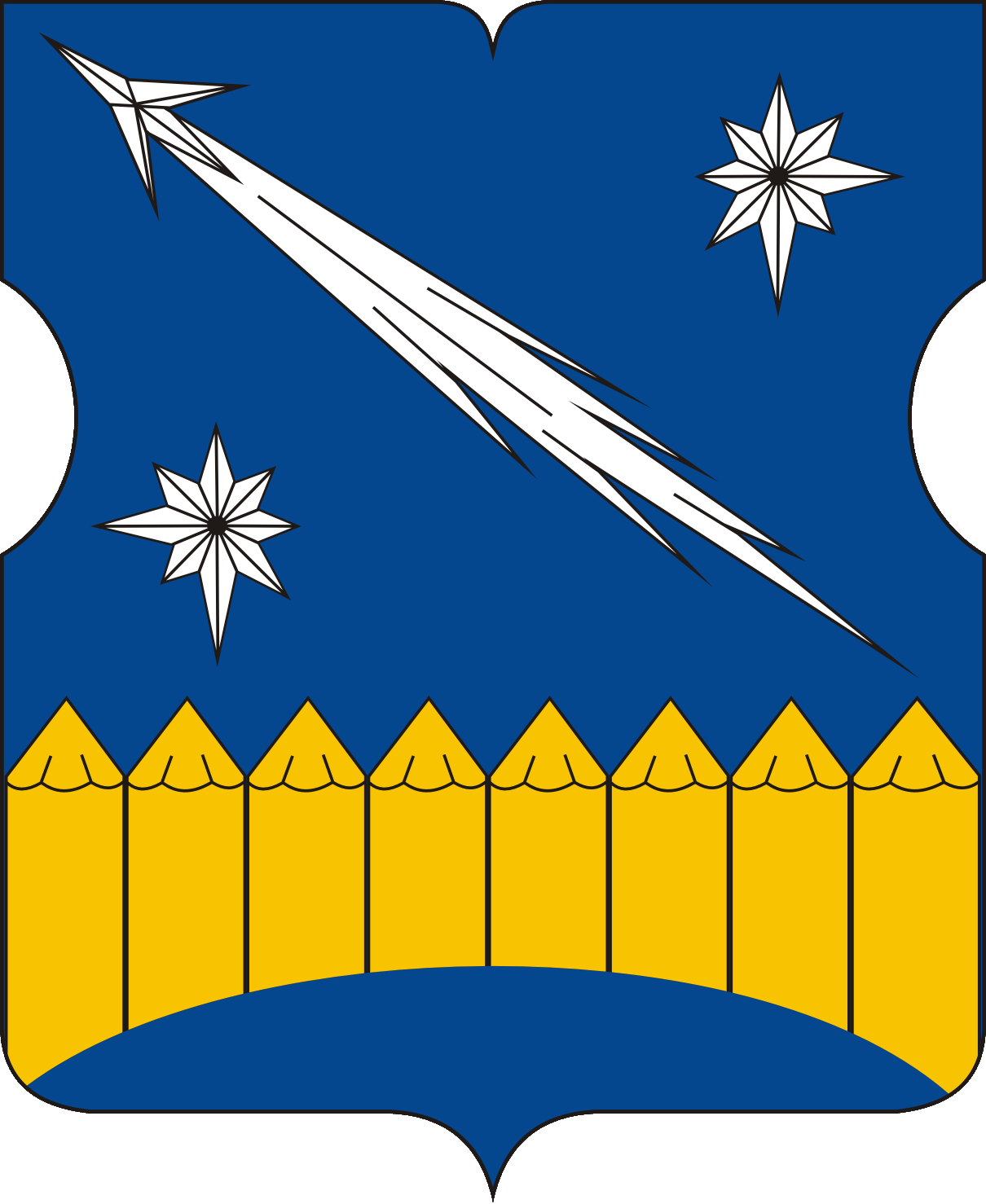
- Flag Coat of arms
- Location of Ostankinsky District on the map of Moscow
- Coordinates: 55°49′50″N 37°37′16″E
- Country: Russia
- Federal subject: Moscow
- Time zone: UTC+
- OKTMO ID: 45358000
- Website: http://ostankino.mos.ru/

Ostankinsky District, also called simply Ostankino, is an administrative district (raion) of North-Eastern Administrative Okrug, and one of the 125 raions of Moscow, Russia. VDNH exhibition center and Ostankino Tower, the tallest structure in Europe, are located in Ostankinsky. The district is served by Moscow Monorail.

== History and etymology ==
Ostankinsky district is named after Ostankino village, which existed on the site before urbanization. Its name literally means 'remains'; however, despite popular misconception, it was not built on a graveyard. 16th-century sources refer to the village as Ostashkovo, from the Christian name Eustachy.

As a populated place Ostankino has been known at least since the Russian Time of Troubles, but it is better associated with the Sheremetiev estate in the form of a park and palace complex. During the dissolution of the Soviet Union it gained even more fame with its television tower and television centre.

== Parks, squares, and pedestrian zones ==
Landscape Park at VDNKh

In 2018-2019, a landscape park with five thematic zones was created in the northern and northwestern parts of the VDNKh (Exhibition of Achievements of National Economy) territory. The park's chief architect was French designer Michel Pena.

The "Botanical Nature" zone encompasses the area around the Third Kamensky Pond (part of the Kamensky River). This zone features the restored "Cinema" pavilion, which houses a museum, and the refurbished Golden Ear Fountain.

The "Nature of Entertainment" zone includes an artificial stream, a circular beach with decking, sun loungers, and a canopy. Near the bridge between the Second and Third Kamensky Ponds, a green labyrinth shaped like a chessboard was created, with walls made of various trees and shrubs, including two-meter-high thujas, spruces, apple trees, lindens, and other species.

The "Wild Nature" zone, located in the Sheremetyevsky Oak Forest, features a 474-meter-long elevated trail with night lighting, reaching a maximum height of 6.5 meters above the ground. Nearby, three stainless steel mesh art installations titled "Birds," created by French artist Cédric Le Borgne, are suspended from trees, each standing about 3.5 meters tall.

The "Cultivated Nature" zone, behind the "Cosmos" pavilion, is planted with oats, millet, and silver phacelia. Near the Chapel of St. Basil the Great, a Syringarium (lilac garden) blooms with purple and white lilacs. The Michurin Garden contains over 1,000 fruit trees and 500 fruit bushes, while to the south lies the "Big Picture of Fields," a system of flowerbeds forming an abstract pattern inspired by the works of Wassily Kandinsky.

The "Nature of Science and Arts" zone, located between the Green Theater and the "Moskvarium," features three areas collectively known as the Alley of Halls. The Game Hall, under arched structures, includes spaces for board games such as chess, checkers, Chinese checkers, and Go. Behind the Moskvarium is the Reading Hall, an open platform with tables and benches. East of the gazebo is the Theater Hall, an amphitheater with a stage for performances.

Ostankino Park

Ostankino Park, located along Botanicheskaya and 1st Ostankinskaya Streets, was part of the 18th–19th-century Ostankino Estate palace and park ensemble. It originally consisted of an "English" landscape section and a "French" formal garden. In 1932, the park was renamed the Central Park of Culture and Leisure named after F.E. Dzerzhinsky, incorporated into VDNKh in 1976, and restored to its original name, "Ostankino," in 1991. The park covers 71 hectares and boasts rich flora and fauna, including lindens, elms, maples, birches, aspens, pines, and spruces, as well as species listed in the Moscow Red Book, such as the martagon lily, lily of the valley, and broad-leaved helleborine. The park is home to hedgehogs, weasels, squirrels, and rare bird species like hawks, tawny owls, and willow tits.

In 2014, the park underwent significant renovations, adding modern workout areas, a football field with natural grass, a hockey rink, and a horseback riding trail. During winter, a natural ice skating rink opens. In 2016, the free "Megadrom Ostankino" skatepark, Europe's largest at the time, was opened but soon closed due to poor construction quality.

Near the Garden Pond, a green belvedere was built in 2014, featuring benches for relaxation. Two cast-iron gazebos in the French style were installed in the eastern part of the park. On the western shore of the Garden Pond, the "Alexander I Peninsula" was created, with a wooden deck and chairs for relaxation. To the east of the pond, an open-air stage and a covered dance floor host events for older visitors. The park also features picnic areas and benches throughout.

Square at the "Worker and Kolkhoz Woman" Monument

The square around Vera Mukhina's iconic monument and the "Worker and Kolkhoz Woman" exhibition pavilion was redesigned in 2018. The previously neglected area was transformed into a formal landscape with symmetrical flowerbeds and benches on either side of the monument. Trees were planted in a zigzag pattern integrated into the tiled pavement.

Cosmopark (Alley of Cosmonauts, Alley of Space Heroes)

This 9-hectare park, established in 1967 around the Memorial Museum of Cosmonautics and the "Conquerors of Space" monument, features a central memorial alley and branching walking paths. Designed by architects Mikhail Barshch and Alexander Kolchin, the alley was named in 1972. It includes 14 monuments honoring Soviet space heroes, such as engineers Sergei Korolev and Valentin Glushko, and cosmonauts Yuri Gagarin, Valentina Tereshkova, and Alexei Leonov. The central alley has flowerbeds and star-shaped pedestals engraved with key dates in space exploration. A sculpture of the Solar System and the "Globe Square" with monuments depicting a star map and a model of Earth are also present. The latter bears quotes from Konstantin Tsiolkovsky: "The impossible today will become possible tomorrow" and "Earth is the cradle of the mind, but one cannot live in a cradle forever".

Dubovaya Roshcha Park (Oak Grove Park)

Located between Akademika Koroleva Street and Dubovaya Roshcha Passage, near the Ostankino Tower, this park is named for its abundance of oak trees. It is primarily a walking area with a network of paths. A children's playground is situated on the side of Akademika Koroleva Street, while a workout area is located near the television center (19 Akademika Koroleva Street).

== Gallery ==
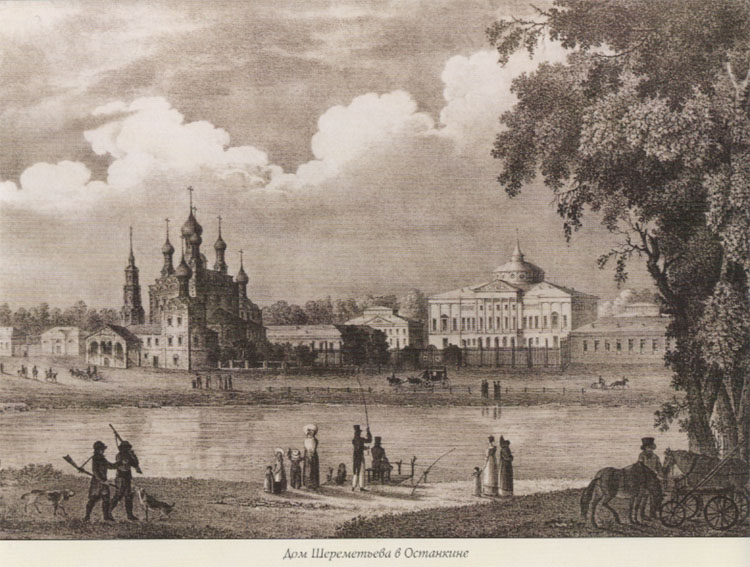
The Sheremetiev estate at Ostankino

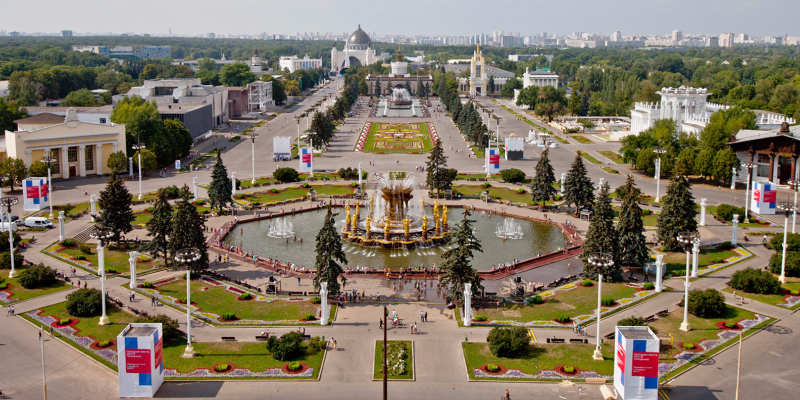
The Exhibition Park of the National Economy Achievements

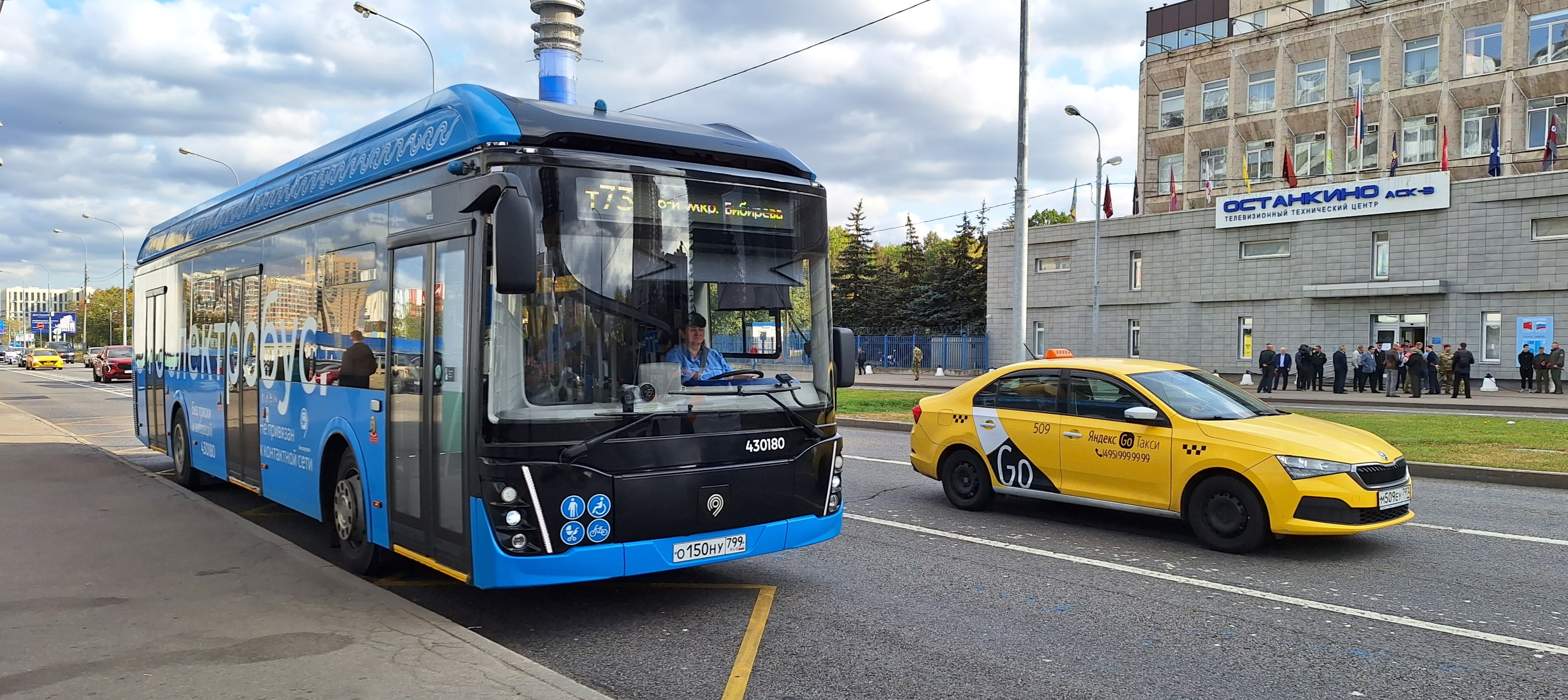
LiAZ-6274 electrobus

== See also ==
- Administrative divisions of Moscow
