= Bazhenovo, Belebeyevsky District, Republic of Bashkortostan =

Bazhenovo Баженово
- Selo
- Location within Bashkortostan Location within Russia
- Coordinates: 53°58′N 53°54′E
- Country: Russia
- Region: Bashkortostan
- District: Belebeyevsky District
- Time zone: UTC+5:00

Bazhenovo (Russian: Баженово) is a rural locality (a selo) and the administrative centre of Bazhenovsky Selsoviet, Belebeyevsky District, Bashkortostan, Russia. The population was 1,120 as of 2010. There are 25 streets.

== Geography ==
Bazhenovo is located at 24 km southwest of Belebey (the district's administrative centre) by road. Yekaterinovka is the nearest rural locality.
