= Stepnoy Dvorets =

Stepnoy Dvorets Степной Дворец
- Selo
- Location within Republic of Buryatia Location within Russia
- Coordinates: 52°10′N 106°23′E
- Country: Russia
- Region: Republic of Buryatia
- District: Kabansky District
- Time zone: UTC+8:00

Stepnoy Dvorets (Russian: Степной Дворец) is a rural locality (selo) in Kabansky District, Republic of Buryatia, Russia. In 2010, The population of the locality was 338. There are 6 streets.

== Geography ==
Stepnoy Dvorets is located 26 km northwest of Kabansk (the district's administrative centre) by road. Ranzhurovo is the nearest rural locality.

== Notable People ==
The Deputy for the Communist Party in the 7th State Duma of the Russian Federation,Leonid Kalashnikov, was born in Stepnoy Dvorets on 6 August, 1960.
