= Menshikov (surname) =

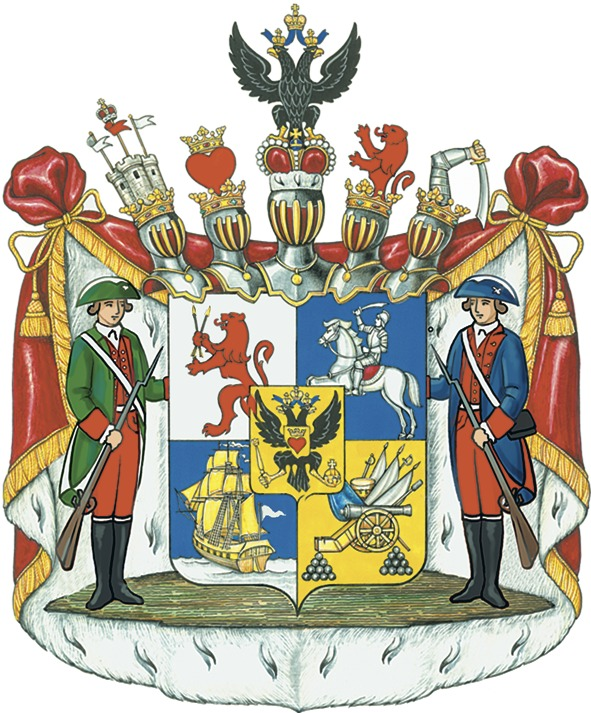
Coat of arms of the Menshikov family

Menshikov (Russian: Меншиков/Меншиков) is a Russian masculine surname, its feminine counterpart is Menshikova (Russian: Меншикова/Меншикова). It may refer to:

- Aleksandr Aleksandrovich Menshikov (1714–1764), Russian noble army officer
- Aleksandr Danilovich Menshikov (1673–1729), Russian nobleman, statesman, and military leader
- Aleksandr Sergeyevich Menshikov (1787–1869), Finnish-Russian nobleman, military commander and statesman
- Maria Menshikova (1711–1729), daughter of Aleksandr Danilovich and a favourite of Peter I of Russia
- Mikhail Menshikov (born 1948), Russian-British mathematician
- Nina Menshikova (1928–2007), Soviet actress
- Oleg Menshikov (born 1960), Russian actor
- Stanislav Menshikov (1927–2014), Russian economist and diplomat
- Vitali Menshikov (born 1989), Russian ice hockey player
- Vladimir Menshikov (artist) (1933–1994), Soviet woodcutter and painter
