= Bazhenovo, Birsky District, Republic of Bashkortostan =

Bazhenovo Баженово
- Selo
- Location within Bashkortostan Location within Russia
- Coordinates: 55°29′N 55°35′E
- Country: Russia
- Region: Bashkortostan
- District: Birsky District
- Time zone: UTC+5:00

Bazhenovo (Russian: Баженово) is a rural locality (a selo) in Bakhtybayevsky Selsoviet, Birsky District, Bashkortostan, Russia. The population was 569 as of 2010. There are 10 streets.

== Geography ==
Bazhenovo is located 13 km north of Birsk (the district's administrative centre) by road. Vyazovsky is the nearest rural locality.
