= Robert Kochiev =

Russian politician

Robert Kochiev MP
- Роберт Кочиев
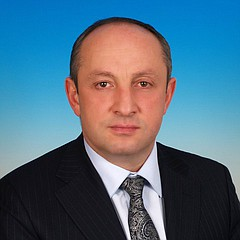

Member of the State Duma (Party List Seat)
- Incumbent
- Assumed office 12 October 2021
- In office 21 December 2011 – 5 October 2016

Personal details
- Born: 16 March 1966 (age 60) Tskhinvali, South Ossetian AO, Georgian SSR, USSR
- Party: Communist Party of the Russian Federation
- Education: North Ossetian State Medical Institute

Robert Ivanovich Kochiev (Russian: Роберт Иванович Кочиев; born March 16, 1966, Tskhinvali) is a Russian political figure and a deputy of the 6th and 8th State Dumas.

From 2007 to 2011, Kochiev was the deputy of the Parliament of the Republic of North Ossetia–Alania of the 4th convocation. In 2011, he was elected deputy of the 6th State Duma from the North Ossetia–Alania constituency. From 2017 to 2021, he was the deputy of the Parliament of the Republic of North Ossetia–Alania of the 6th convocation. Since September 2021, he has served as deputy of the 8th State Duma.

== Biography ==
In 1989, he graduated from the North Ossetian State Medical Institute with a degree in pediatrics.

From 1993 to 2005, he worked at the Vladikavkaz trade and production enterprise Sevospotrebsoyuz as Deputy General Director. From 2005 to 2011, he served as General Director of Zabava LLC.

In 2007, he was elected to the Parliament of the Republic of North Ossetia–Alania of the fourth convocation on the Communist Party (CPRF) list.

In 2011, he ran for the State Duma as part of the CPRF candidate list and, following the allocation of mandates, became a deputy of the State Duma of the 6th convocation.

In 2016, he ran for the State Duma of the 7th convocation both in a single-mandate district and on the CPRF party list. A few days before the election, he withdrew his candidacy in the single-mandate district and did not win a mandate through the CPRF list.

== Allegations of Illegal Business Activities ==
In 2023, Russian law enforcement and judicial authorities launched proceedings related to the bankrupt alcohol plant “Rakurs” in Vladikavkaz, which had underpaid 1.4 billion rubles in taxes to the state budget. In media reports on the matter, Robert Kochiev is referred to as the shadow owner of the plant and a “vodka king” — despite the fact that, under the law, serving State Duma deputies are prohibited from engaging in such activities.

The courts of first and second instance of the North Caucasus District agreed with the arguments of the Federal Tax Service, the Deposit Insurance Agency, and the Prosecutor's Office of Vladikavkaz, and held Kochiev subsidiarily liable for the obligations of LLC “Rakurs,” recognizing him as the main beneficiary and controlling person of the enterprise. A criminal case was opened on the grounds of deliberate bankruptcy of the company. The Arbitration Court of the Republic of North Ossetia–Alania placed an arrest on Kochiev's property and funds, with the total value exceeding 3.4 billion rubles.

The Arbitration Court is also considering a case involving an entire network of alcohol-related companies allegedly controlled by Kochiev and implicated in fraudulent schemes. “Special attention is being given to the investigation of criminal cases initiated based on materials from a prosecutor’s inspection into wage arrears (over two months) ... The progress of these investigations is under special control of the Prosecutor’s Office,” the media reported. A final court decision recognizing State Duma deputy Robert Kochiev as the controlling person of LLC “Rakurs” could result in multiple criminal cases being initiated against him.

Despite facing prosecution, while remaining in his position as a State Duma deputy, Kochiev opposed an anti-corruption bill regulating the vodka business that was introduced in parliament. To combat abuses, amendments to the law “On State Regulation of the Production and Circulation of Ethyl Alcohol, Alcoholic and Alcohol-Containing Products” were proposed. Among other measures, the amendments introduce the concept of a “list of persons with an unsatisfactory business reputation” and increase the minimum authorized capital requirement for alcohol producers (from 10 million to 100 million rubles). Kochiev spoke against these measures in the State Duma, claiming they hinder business. The press notes that after his remarks, the State Duma's administrative apparatus may initiate an inquiry into a potential conflict of interest.

== Sanctions ==
He was sanctioned by the UK government in 2022 in relation to the Russo-Ukrainian War.
