= Sergey Glazkov =

Soviet footballer and Russian manager

Personal information
- Full name: Sergey Albertovich Glazkov
- Date of birth: 9 August 1967 (age 59)
- Position: Midfielder

Senior career*
| Years | Team | Apps | (Gls) |
| 1989 | FC Spartak Kostroma | 17 | (2) |
| 1990–1991 | FC Dynamo Stavropol | 5 | (0) |
| 1991 | FC Spartak Kostroma | 23 | (2) |

Managerial career
- 2003: FC Spartak Kostroma (assistant)
- 2010–2011: FC Dynamo Kostroma
- 2011: FC Dynamo Kostroma (vice-president)
- * Club domestic league appearances and goals

Sergey Albertovich Glazkov (Russian: Серге́й Альбе́ртович Глазко́в; born 9 August 1967) is a professional association football manager from Russia and a former Soviet player.
