= Eustachy =

Eustachy is a given name. Notable people with the name include:

- Eustachy Erazm Sanguszko (1768–1844), Polish general and politician
- Eustachy Sapieha (1881–1963), Polish nobleman, prince, politician, Minister of Foreign Affairs and deputy to the Polish parliament
- Eustachy Stanisław Sanguszko (1842–1903), Polish noble (szlachcic), conservative politician
- Eustachy Tyszkiewicz (1814–1874), Polish–Lithuanian noble, archaeologist and historian from the former Grand Duchy of Lithuania
- Larry Eustachy (born 1955), former NCAA Men's Basketball coach
