= For a New Socialism =

For a New Socialism Движение За новый социализм
- Abbreviation: DZNS
- Leader: Nikolay Platoshkin
- Founded: 29 January 2019; 7 years ago
- Headquarters: Dmitrov Highway 9, Moscow
- Newspaper: News of Socialism
- Youth wing: Youth for a New Socialism
- Membership (2021): 78,987
- Ideology: Socialism of the 21st century Democratic socialism New Economic Policy; Soviet patriotism Left-wing populism
- Political position: Centre-left to left-wing
- National affiliation: National Patriotic Forces of Russia; Communist Party of the Russian Federation (for 2021 elections)
- Colours: Red
- Slogan: "For a New Socialism!" (Russian: "За новый социализм!")
- Anthem: Bella ciao
- Federation Council: 0 / 170
- State Duma: 1 / 450
- Regional Parliaments: 2 / 3,994

Website
- new-socialism.org

Social Movement "For a New Socialism" (Russian: Общественное движение «За новый социализм», romanized: Obshchestvennoye dvizheniye «Za novyy sotsializm»; DZNS), also known simply as For a New Socialism, is a social movement and political organization led by Russian politician, diplomat, political scientist, and historian Nikolay Platoshkin. The stated goal of the movement is to restore socialism in Russia through peaceful and legal means, namely elections.

For a New Socialism supports the preservation of private property and seeks to form a mixed economy with state support for small and medium-sized businesses, based on Lenin's New Economic Policy, and an inclusive democracy with multi-party participation and a diversity of opinions.

== History ==
=== Founding ===
A previous movement with the name "For a New Socialism" (the full name was "Russian Movement for a New Socialism") existed in Russia in the 1990s and 2000s and was headed by the former head of the Presidential Administration and leader of the Union of Realists Yury Petrov with the support of the mayor of Moscow Yury Luzhkov. The movement held its first congress in 1997. The movement aimed to unite small socialist parties into a single pre-election bloc and to win the 2000 presidential election.

For a New Socialism was re-formed by Nikolay Platoshkin on January 29, 2019. The movement held its first congress on November 7, 2019. Joining the ranks of the movement is carried out by filling out a questionnaire on the website new-socialism.org. By March 2020, the movement had representative offices in 74 settlements of Russia.

On May 8, 2020, Platoshkin announced on his YouTube channel that the movement would be transformed into a political party and would take part in the 2020 Russian regional elections. It was also announced that For a New Socialism would seek to form a single socialist bloc and had entered into negotiations with the Party of Business and the Party of Russia's Rebirth to join the bloc. On June 2, Platoshkin announced that he would become leader the Alternative for Russia (Party of Socialist Choice), which had been officially registered by the Ministry of Justice. He later clarified that For a New Socialism would not be disbanded, but would become the support base for Alternative for Russia (Party of Socialist Choice). However, the Alternative for Russia (Party of Socialist Choice) refused to make Platoshkin its leader, after which For a New Socialism began to form the Socialist Party of the Russian Federation.

=== Alliance with the Communist Party of the Russian Federation ===
In June 2020, Platoshkin was placed on house arrest for inducing mass riots. After his release from house arrest, Platoshkin abandoned plans to transform For a New Socialism into a political party and took a course to create and strengthen an alliance with the Communist Party of the Russian Federation and the Left Front, participating in a congress of the Communist Party and calling for the unification of all left-wing forces before the 2021 parliamentary elections. Following the congress, the Communist Party nominated 7 candidates from the movement in single-mandate districts.

Cooperation between For a New Socialism and the Russian Party of Freedom and Justice was also considered, with the Russian Party of Freedom and Justice's leader Maxim Shevchenko publicly saying that cooperation between the two parties was highly likely. Following Shevchenko's comments, Platoshkin dismissed the chances of cooperation and accused Shevchenko and other coordinators of the party of being "spoilers" that worked for the United Russia party. On July 3, speakers at a congress of the Russian Party of Freedom and Justice introduced themselves as "representatives of the Movement for a New Socialism". Platoshkin declared these speakers "impostors", claiming they did not represent For a New Socialism.

=== Formation of the Socialist Party of the Russian Federation ===
The movement's official political party, the Socialist Party of the Russian Federation, was created in the autumn of 2020. The founding congress of the party was held on October 17, 2020. The congress was attended by delegates from 53 constituent entities of the Russian Federation, who unanimously voted to create the party. On October 23, registration documents were submitted to the Ministry of Justice, however, in December, the Ministry of Justice refused to register the party.

== Ideology and aims ==
The program of the movement was first published on January 29, 2019.

Program points

- Nationalization of natural resources, railway transport, and energy supply companies
- Crediting a part of oil and gas export revenues to the personal account of every Russian who has made contributions to the pension fund for 15 years or more
- Cancellation of proposed pension reform
- Creation of free higher and secondary education and the cancellation of the Unified State Exam
- Reforming the education system to base enrollment in universities on competitive selection
- Introduction of a progressive income tax system
- Freezing of tariffs on natural monopolies and on housing and communal services for 2 years
- Compensation to citizens for Sberbank deposits frozen in 1991
- Ban offshore banking for companies with state participation, as well as for private companies with more than 500 employees
- Confiscation of property for items purchased through the embezzlement of public funds
- A ban on civil service for persons (and their direct relatives) who have real estate, shares and bank accounts abroad
- The ability to recall (through a referendum) any elected person (including the president) who has worked for at least half of the term
- Changing the term of office of the president and deputies of the Federal Assembly to 4 years, allowing for one-time re-election.
- Changing the salary of the president to no more than 10 times the average salary in the country and the salary of members of the Federal Assembly to no more than 4 times the average salary
- Direct election of the judges of district and regional courts
- Reforming the procedures for holding referendums and organizing rallies and demonstrations
- Renaming the police to militsiya
- Qualification of corruption as a special grave crime in the Criminal Code of the Russian Federation
- Direct elections of members of the Federation Council; these candidates would have to permanently reside in the region for at least 5 years before the elections.
- Direct elections of heads of regions and the cancellation of the municipal filter
- A ban on the entry into election commissions off persons in the state or municipal service and the creations of live broadcasts of the vote counting on the Internet with a demonstration of the final protocol
- Creation of a union state with the republics of the former Soviet Union while allowing the free expression of the will of the citizens of these republics
- The adoption of the Flag of the Soviet Union (the Victory Banner), a double-headed eagle without monarchical symbols (crown, orb, and scepter), and the State Anthem of the Soviet Union as the state symbols of Russia

== Movement structure ==
The movement consists of central authorities and regional offices.

=== Central authorities ===
- Movement leader: Nikolay Platoshkin
- First Assistant and Head of Regional Relations: Ruslan Ismagilov
- Head of Youth Direction: Kirill Andreyev
- Head of the International Department: Olga Kosterina
- Head of Financial Services: Anzhelika Glazkova

=== Branches in Russia ===
- Moscow leader: Sergei Prakh
- Moscow Oblast leader: Dmitry Kondratenko
- Central Federal District curator: Sergei Druzhbin
- Northwestern Federal District curator: Vitaly Filimonov
- North Caucasian Federal District curator: Telman Batsazov
- Southern Federal District curator: Dmitry Ten
- Volga Federal District curator: Igor Zaitsev
- Siberian Federal District curator: Andrey Nedorezov
- Far Eastern Federal District curator: Dmitry Petrushin
- Khabarovsk curator: Anzhelica Shcheglova

=== Fraternal movements and foreign branches ===
In mid-January 2020, Olga Kosterina was appointed coordinator of fraternal movements.

== Reception and criticisms ==
Evgeny Tarlo, Doctor of Law, described the movement's program as "a set of wishes, dreams, platitudes and the desire to live well without working". He regarded the movement's program as "a kindergarten of political activity" but noted that many points of this program would be easy to implement in the current political climate of Russia.

In November 2019, Viktor Trushkov, (Doctor of Sciences and professor, published his opinion in the Communist Party of the Russian Federation's Pravda newspaper. In his article on the movement, Trushkov described the movement's proposed political system as "not fundamentally differ[ing] from the current capitalist one, except for minor cosmetic repairs" and claimed that the movement practiced a form of "opportunism". He concluded that the movement was not socialist but rather promoted neoliberalism, remarking: "Proceeding from the criteria of Marxism–Leninism, I immediately began to look for the new socialists' vision of property relations. There was no paragraph clearly answering this basic question in the document. There was also no provision for the elimination of the exploitation of man by man [...] to the proletarian revolution, the Platoshkin army turns up its nose: it is taboo in the program. Apparently, the delegates of the congress of adherents of the new socialism like the formula of the neoliberal N. Svanidze: 'I am not any radical, not an extremist. I can always find a common language with the authorities'". Journalist Vladimir Volk shared this sentiment stating that the movement could "turn into another drain of the leftist sentiments of society".

Inversely, political analyst Pavel Salin believes that the movement, due to its small scale, cannot be a serious competitor or hindrance to the Communist Party. The coordinator of the Left Front Sergei Udaltsov noted that he regarded the movement as "his allies" and "supporters of socialism". He later noted: "Although we can see such examples occur when the movement gained a sufficient number of supporters, and in the end everything was aimed not at uniting the left movement, but in fact at disuniting it, at taking people under the wing of the current government [...] the coming months will show what is the real direction of the movement created by Platoshkin".

== Membership ==
Number of members of For a New Socialism
Period	December 2019	January 2020	February 2020	March 2020	May 2020
Amount	35,000	40,000	52,000	62,000	78,000

== Representation in government bodies ==
- Anzhelika Glazkova − Member of the State Duma since 2021 (serving as a Communist)
- Sergey Ilyin − Deputy of the Khabarovsk Krai Legislative Duma (serving as a non-partisan politician)
- Sergey Savostyanov − Deputy of the Moscow City Duma (serving as a Communist)
