= Grachyovsky District =

Location of Orenburg Oblast in Russia

Location of Stavropol Krai in Russia

Grachyovsky District is the name of several administrative and municipal districts in Russia.

- Grachyovsky District, Orenburg Oblast, an administrative and municipal district of Orenburg Oblast
- Grachyovsky District, Stavropol Krai, an administrative and municipal district of Stavropol Krai

== See also ==
- Grachyovsky (disambiguation)
