= Anzhelika Glazkova =

Russian politician (born 1968)

Anzhelika Glazkova MP
- Анжелика Глазкова
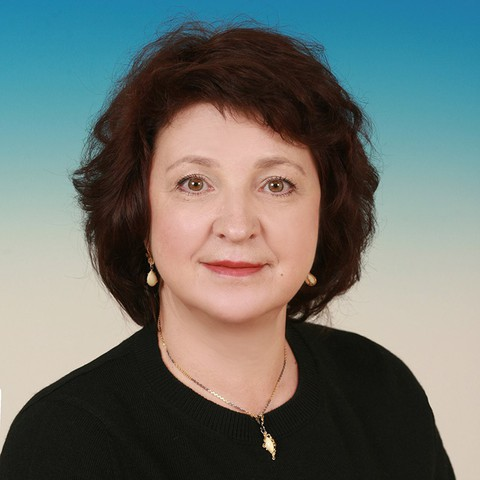

Member of the State Duma (Party List Seat)
- Incumbent
- Assumed office 12 October 2021

Personal details
- Born: 28 December 1968 (age 57) Kostroma, RSFSR, USSR
- Party: Communist Party of the Russian Federation
- Spouse: Nikolay Platoshkin
- Education: Kostroma State Agricultural Academy

Anzhelika Yegorovna Glazkova (Russian: Анжелика Егоровна Глазкова; born 28 December 1968, Kostroma) is a Russian political figure and a deputy of the 8th State Duma.

Glazkova worked at a design institute in Kostroma and at the tax office. She was an accountant in the field of thermal power engineering in Kostroma. In 2006 Glazkova moved to Moscow. From 2006 to 2019, she worked as a chief accountant of the Moscow United Energy Company. She also worked as an advisor to Yury Afonin. Since September 2021, she has served as deputy of the 8th State Duma.

== Sanctions ==
She was sanctioned by the UK government in 2022 in relation to the Russo-Ukrainian War.
