= Nikolay Platoshkin =

Russian politician, diplomat and historian

- Николай Платошкин
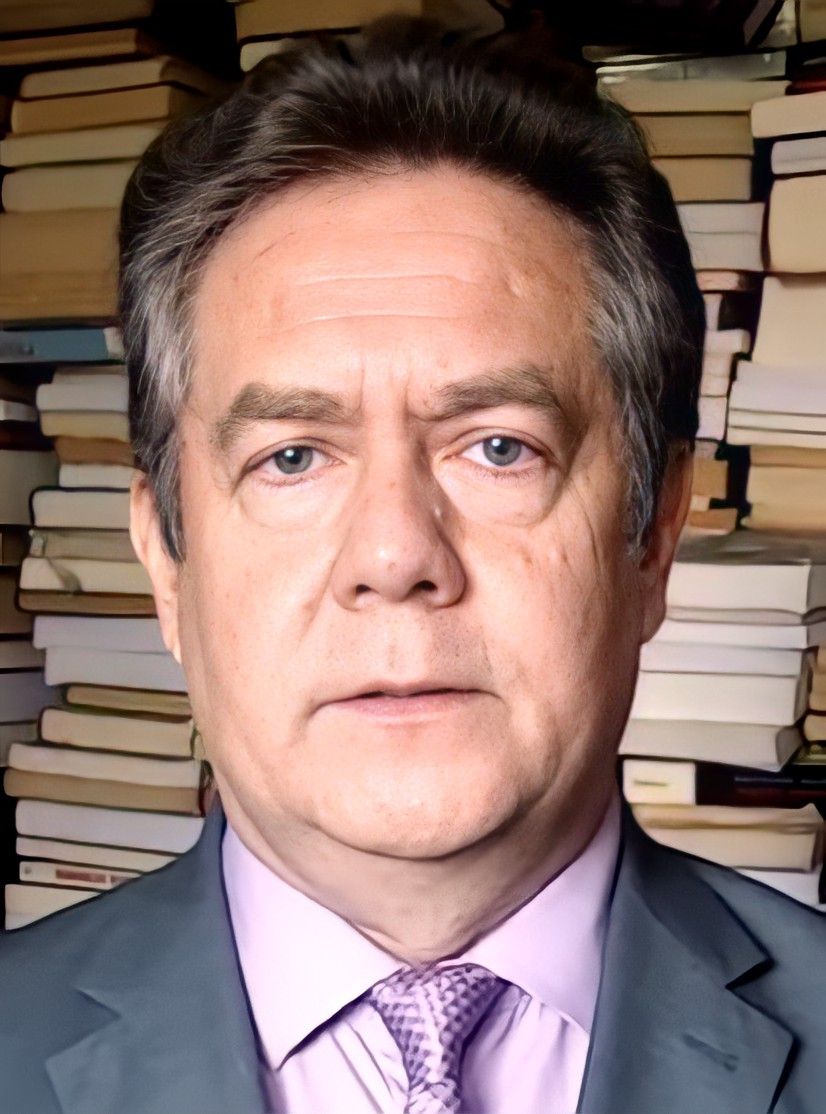
- Platoshkin in 2020

Leader of For a New Socialism
- Incumbent
- Assumed office 29 January 2019

Personal details
- Born: Nikolay Nikolayevich Platoshkin; 19 October 1965 (age 60) Mescherino, Moscow Oblast, Soviet Union
- Citizenship: Soviet Union (1965–1991); Russia (1991–present)
- Party: For a New Socialism
- Spouse: Anzhelika Glazkova
- Education: Moscow State Institute of International Relations; Diplomatic Academy of the Ministry of Foreign Affairs of the Russian Federation
- Occupation: Diplomat; writer; translator; historian

Nikolay Nikolayevich Platoshkin (Russian: Николай Николаевич Платошкин; born 19 October 1965) is a Russian and former Soviet diplomat, political scientist, and historian.

He is a Doctor of Historical Sciences, Associate Professor, and Head of the Department of International Relations and Diplomacy at the Moscow University for the Humanities. He is also an author of translations of foreign monographs, a political expert on television, and the leader of the movement "For a New Socialism".

== Biography ==
Platoshkin was born on 19 October 1965, in the village of Mescherino, Stupinsky District, Moscow Oblast, Russian by nationality. His parents worked in Sovkhoz (state farm).

He graduated from Chulkovo School No. 20 with a gold medal, and in the same place received the rights of a tractor driver-machinist of the 3rd class of a wide profile.

In 1982, he entered the MGIMO of the Ministry of Foreign Affairs of the USSR at the Faculty of International Relations (Western Department), which he graduated with honors in 1987. In 2003, he graduated from a special course for senior staff at the Diplomatic Academy of the Ministry of Foreign Affairs of the Russian Federation.

From 1987 to 2006, he worked in Russian diplomatic missions in Germany and the US.

== Work in diplomatic missions ==
In 1998, he headed the department of Armenia at the Russian Foreign Ministry.

From May 2004 to 2006, he served as vice consul at the Russian Consulate in Houston. He was present at the opening of the Russian Cultural Center in Austin, Texas. By decision of the US government, he was expelled from the country.

In 2006, he left the diplomatic service due to the behavior of the Ministry of Foreign Affairs regarding his wife. He switched to teaching later that year.

== Scientific and teaching activities ==
His main areas of research and teaching are the history of Germany, the history of Latin America, the history of Spain, the history of Czechia, issues of current international relations and the foreign policy of Russia, and contemporary German politics.

In 2003 he defended his thesis on the topic "Memel (Klaipėda) issue in international relations", and in 2009 – a doctoral thesis on "Causes and Progress of the Berlin Crisis of 1953–1961".

Currently, Platoshkin is the head of the department of international relations and diplomacy at Moscow University for the Humanities. On 25 May 2018, a two-year lecture course "Germany in the war and post-war time" was completed as part of the evening courses of Dmitry Pozharsky University.

== Expert on TV and radio, video blogger ==
Nikolay Platoshkin acted as an expert in television and radio broadcasts: “60 minutes” on Russia-1 channel, "Time Will Show" on Channel One, "Meeting Place" on NTV channel, "Right to Vote" on TV Centre channel, the radio "Komsomolskaya Pravda" and others.

Since 19 October 2019, after declaring his intention to be a candidate for the Russian presidential election in 2024, he no longer received an invitation to speak on the main Russian television channels, since, in his opinion, he was included in the "black list" on a command from the Presidential Administration.

== Social and political activities ==
Since 1988 – a candidate for membership in the Communist Party. In 1989, he refused entry, citing this act as a disagreement with the policy of the General Secretary Mikhail Gorbachev.

During the events of the Velvet Revolution in Armenia, he supported popular protests and the coming to power of Nikol Pashinyan.

He criticized the socio-economic policies of Vladimir Putin and the Russian government, in particular, he criticized the budget rule introduced by the Ministry of Finance.

He participated in Moscow protests organized by the Communist Party against the pension reform, and called on supporters to participate in rallies.

In the election of the heads of the constituent entities of the Federation on 9 September 2018, he called for voting against "United Russia" party. In the fall of 2018, at the election of the head of the republic of Khakassia, Platoshkin supported the Communist Party candidate V. Konovalov.

In January 2019, on his Facebook page, Platoshkin posted a video where he announced his intention to create the socio-political association "For a New Socialism" and outlined the main points of the program of this movement (the goal of the movement is to restore socialism in Russia through elections).

After not admitting to the elections to the Moscow City Duma, he put forward instead of himself and supported Savostyanov, who subsequently won the election. On 19 June 2019, he himself was nominated by the Communist Party at the by-election to the State Duma of the Russian Federation of the VII convocation in the 70th constituency (northern part of the Khabarovsk Krai), and took second place.

He opposes amendments to the constitution and the nullification of the presidential term of Vladimir Putin.

He positively assesses the activities of Joseph Stalin.

He supports the annexation of Crimea, Putin's declaration of independence of DPR and LPR and subsequent entry of Russian troops into Ukraine, saying it is a "special operation", not a "war".

== Political repression ==
On 4 June 2020, the Russian Investigative Committee opened a criminal case against Platoshkin on charges of inducing mass riots, as well as publicly disseminating knowingly false information about circumstances that pose a threat to the life and safety of citizens. In the morning, a search was carried out in Platoshkin's apartment, as a result of which, according to his wife, they took away computers, a camera and family savings. After the search, the politician was detained and taken to the IC of Russia [48]. In the evening, the Basmanny District Court of Moscow sent the politician under house arrest until 2 August, after which a new search was conducted at the place of Platoshkin's official residence.

The accusation under the article on riots was made by several Platoshkin's videos on YouTube, the prosecution on article 207.1 of the Criminal Code also concerned videos on YouTube: according to investigators, during a pandemic, a public figure called for a violation of restrictive measures.

On 15 June 2020, Amnesty International recognized the Russian politician Nikolay Platoshkin as a prisoner of conscience.

== Electoral history ==
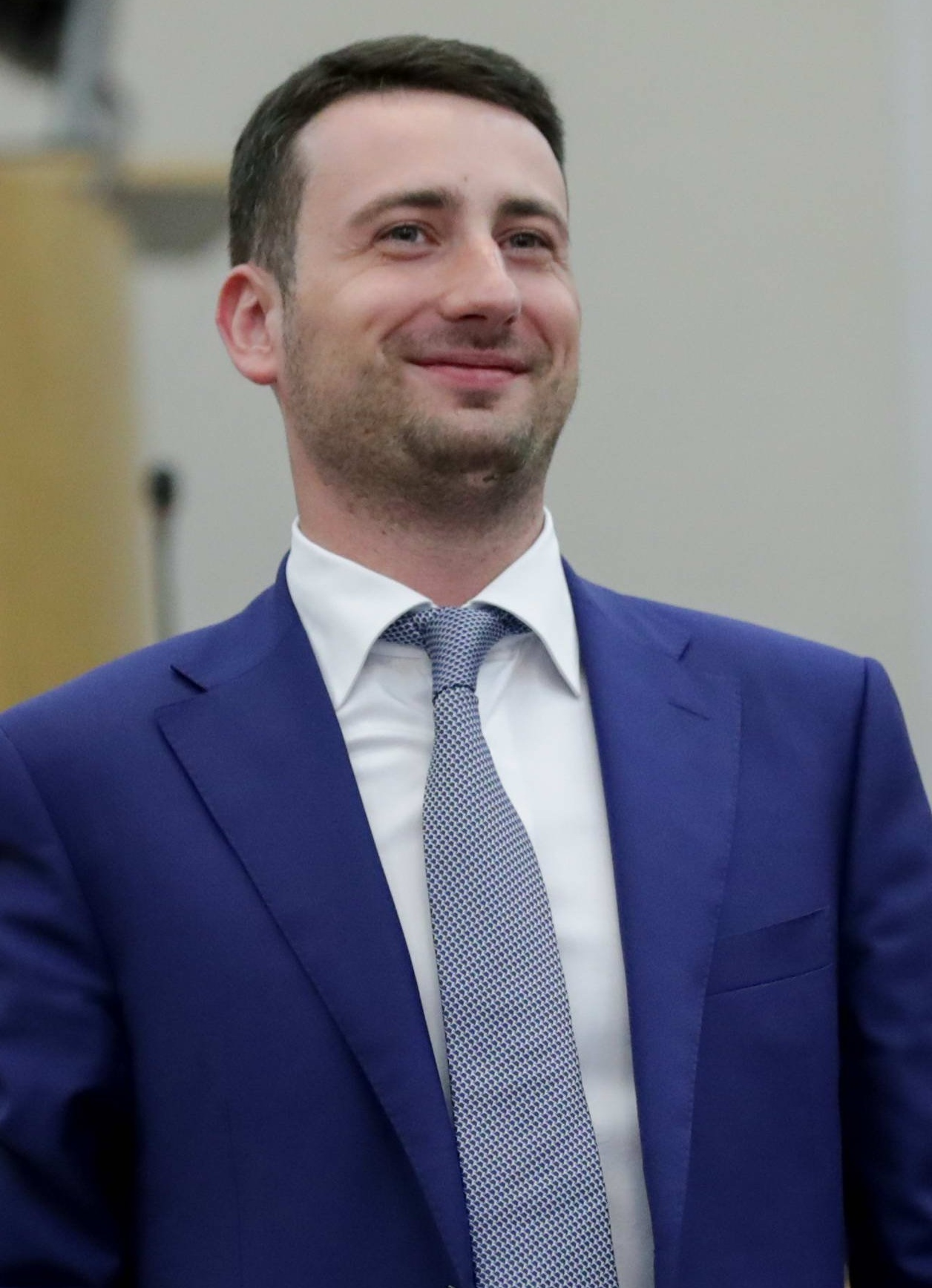
Elected Deputy Ivan Pilyayev

On 23 September 2018, Sergey Furgal who was elected from the Komsomolsk-na-Amure constituency, was elected Governor of Khabarovsk Krai and so a By-election was announced.

Candidate	Party	Votes	%
Ivan Pilyayev	Liberal Democratic Party	65,596	39.1%
Nikolay Platoshkin	Communist Party	41,398	24.7%
Viktoria Tsyganova	United Russia	17,901	10.7%
Tatyana Yaroslavtseva	A Just Russia	7,887	4.7%
Nikolay Yevseenko	Party of Pensioners	5,637	3.7%
Andrey Petrov	The Greens	5,167	3.1%
Vladimir Titorenko	Communists of Russia	4,898	2.9%
Vladimir Vorobyov	Rodina	3,420	2.0%
Andrey Shvetsov	Party of Growth	3,020	1.8%
Oleg Kotov	Patriots of Russia	2,989	1.8%
Total		157,913	100%
