= Chagan, Astrakhan Oblast =

Chagan Чаган
- Selo
- Location within Astrakhan Oblast Location within Russia
- Coordinates: 46°10′N 47°58′E
- Country: Russia
- Region: Astrakhan Oblast
- District: Kamyzyaksky District
- Time zone: UTC+4:00

Chagan (Russian: Чаган) is a rural locality (a selo) and the administrative center of Chagansky Selsoviet, Kamyzyaksky District, Astrakhan Oblast, Russia. The population was 1,464 as of 2010. There are 33 streets.

== Geography ==
Chagan is located 32 km northwest of Kamyzyak (the district's administrative centre) by road. Posyolok moryakov and Volgo-Kaspiysky are the nearest rural localities.
