= Timofey Bazhenov =

Russian politician (born 1976)

Timofey Bazhenov MP
- Тимофей Баженов
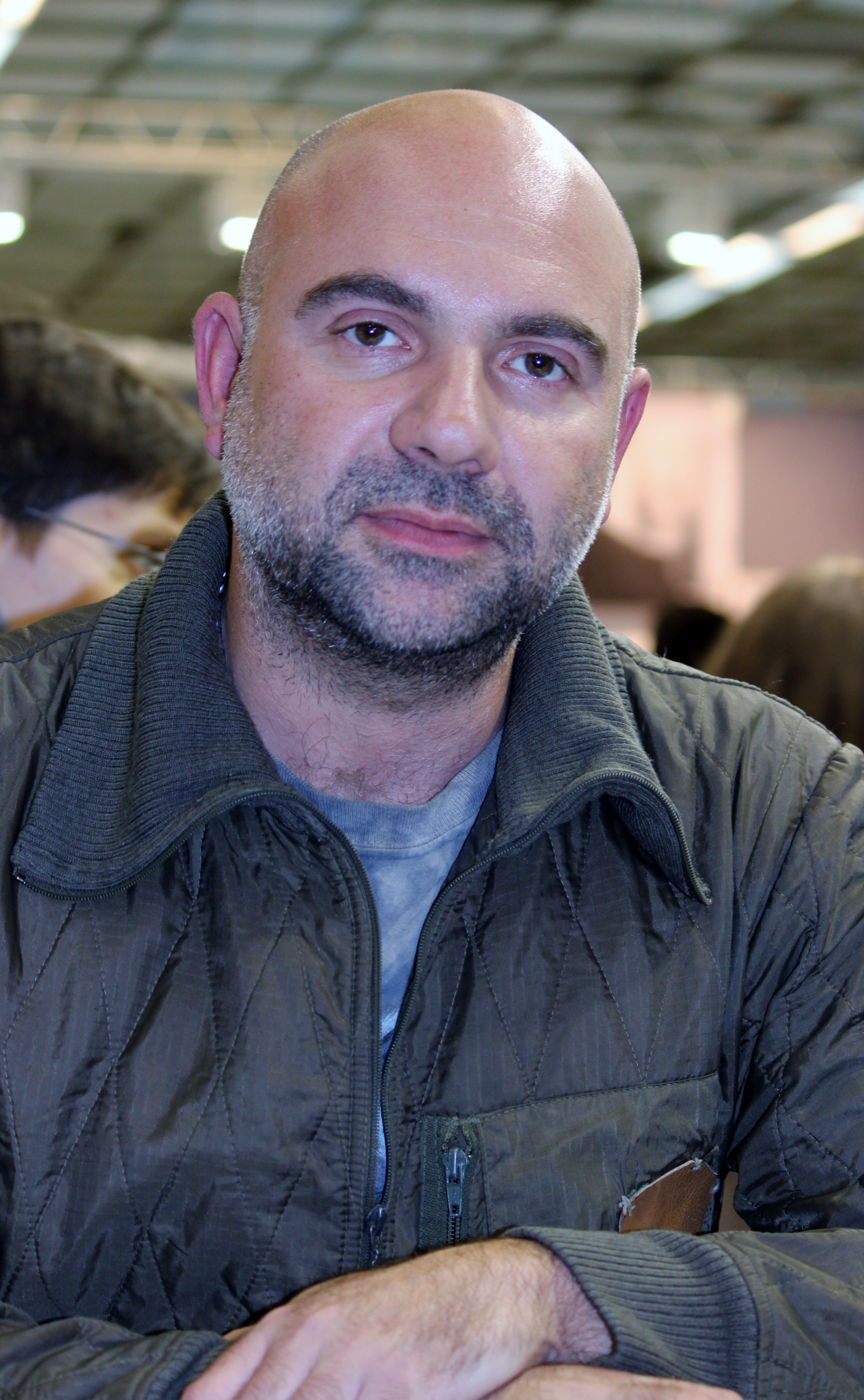

Member of the State Duma for Moscow
- Incumbent
- Assumed office 12 October 2021
- Preceded by: Ivan Teterin
- Constituency: Babushkinsky (No. 196)

Personal details
- Born: 25 January 1976 (age 50) Moscow, RSFSR, USSR
- Party: United Russia
- Education: MSU Faculty of Journalism; Moscow State Pedagogical University
- Occupation: journalist

Timofey Timofeyevich Bazhenov (Russian: Тимофей Тимофеевич Баженов; born 25 January 1976, Moscow) is a Russian political figure, former TV host, and deputy in the 8th convocation of the State Duma.

Starting from 1994, Timofey Bazhenov began to work on the NTV channel, and in 1998 he was officially hired as a reporter. Since then, he has hosted many entertainment TV shows. Bazhenov's political career started in 2015 when he was appointed the head of the press office of the city of Magas. In the 2021 Russian legislative election, Bazhenov ran for deputy of the Babushkinsky constituency under the United Russia political party, obltaining a seat with 38.40% of the vote.

He is also a founder of the environmental movement that shares his name.

== Publication ==
He is the author of the book of short stories "Wild stories. Diary of a real man" ("Дикие истории. Дневник настоящего мужика") - (2019).

== Sanctions ==
He was sanctioned by the UK government in 2022 in relation to the Russo-Ukrainian War.
