= Youth Public Chamber of Russia =

Non-profit organization based in Russia

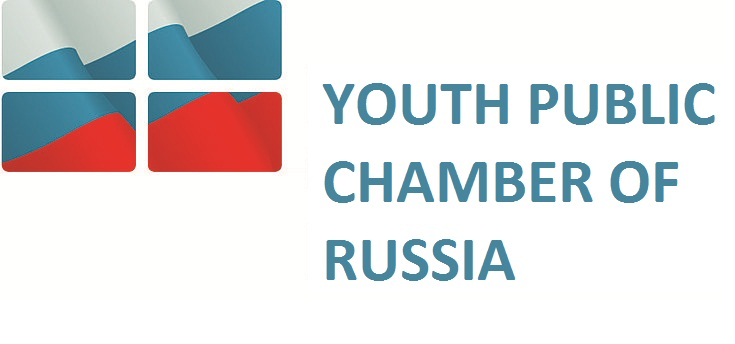
- Type: public organization
- Location: Russia
- Website: www.molpalata.ru

Youth Public Chamber of Russia (Russian: Молодежная общественная палата), abbreviated as YPC, is an institute of civil society, uniting leaders from the youth wings of political parties and young leaders of large non-governmental organizations.

The organization also promotes interactions between young journalists, businessmen, artists, and sportsmen. It was founded in 2006.

The Youth Public Chamber implements national programs such as The Youth City, SMS for Life. It also implements projects in the field of public health services, child protection, and youth public policy.

== Leaders and organisers ==
The initiators of the Youth Public Chamber creation are leaders of youth wings of political parties including, United Russia, Communist Party of the Russian Federation, Liberal Democratic Party of Russia, People's Party of the Russian Federation, Social Democratic Party of Russia, leaders of 30 non-governmental organizations, young politics Dmitriy Gudkov, Alexey Rogozin, Alexei Navalny, Maria Gaidar, journalist Sergey Evdokimov, political scientist Pavel Svyatenkov and others.

Under the Youth Public Chamber exists a board of trustees, which includes members of the Government of Russia, leaders of political parties, members of the Public Chamber of Russia, and famous Russian politicians.

It was announced, that the Youth Public Chamber advances its own bills to influence government youth policy.

== Project programs ==
=== Youth Council of the Shanghai Cooperation Organisation ===
Youth Council of the Shanghai Cooperation Organisation was founded at the initiative of the Youth Public Chamber and Russian Union of Youth with the support of the Russian Government in 2009. The Council is the advisory board of the organization. It chairs all participating countries in rotation. Among the first specific projects under discussion is the creation of the youth camp on lake Issyk Kul in Kirgizia.

=== SMS for life ===
This program provides free SMS informing of young pregnant women about the pregnancy period. It is based on advice on healthy lifestyles for women in different stages of pregnancy, legal advice for future mothers, and advice on childcare during the first months of life. Medical recommendations were prepared by highly skilled experts of the D.O.Ott scientific research institute of Obstetrics and Gynaecology. The national program «SMS for Life» was approved by the participants of the First International Congress of perinatal medicine, which was held in Moscow on 16.06.2011. Leading accoucheurs-gynecologists of the world highly appreciated the efficiency of the program and recommended it to be implemented at the regional level.

=== The Youth City ===
The high cost and inaccessibility of residential property for citizens is the most serious problem for young families in Russia today. One of the main reasons that causes high prices for residential property is corruption. The Supervisory Board that acts within the Program scope consists of representatives from the legislative and executive bodies of Russia and allows the removal of the corruption component from the Program implementation. The main goal of the Program is to construct small satellite towns where young families can purchase their first homes at the lowest price possible as well as work in emerging industries. The residents of these towns will be able to work without actually leaving the town because of the construction of complex residential property as well as a complete set of social and business infrastructure.

=== A.N. Tolstoy's International Competition of the Children's and Youth Literature ===
The Youth Public Chamber holds an annual competition of children's and youth literature under the name of A.N. Tolstoy. The competition is held jointly with the Union of Writers of Russia and urges to lift and strengthen the prestige of scientific and artistic creativity in the consciousness of the young readers of Russia and countries abroad. It also serves to tap into new talents among writers, poets, and publicists writing in Russian. Beginning and skilled writers can participate in the competition without restrictions based on age and place of residence.
