= Yury Afonin =

Russian politician (born 1977)

Yury Afonin MP
- Юрий Афонин
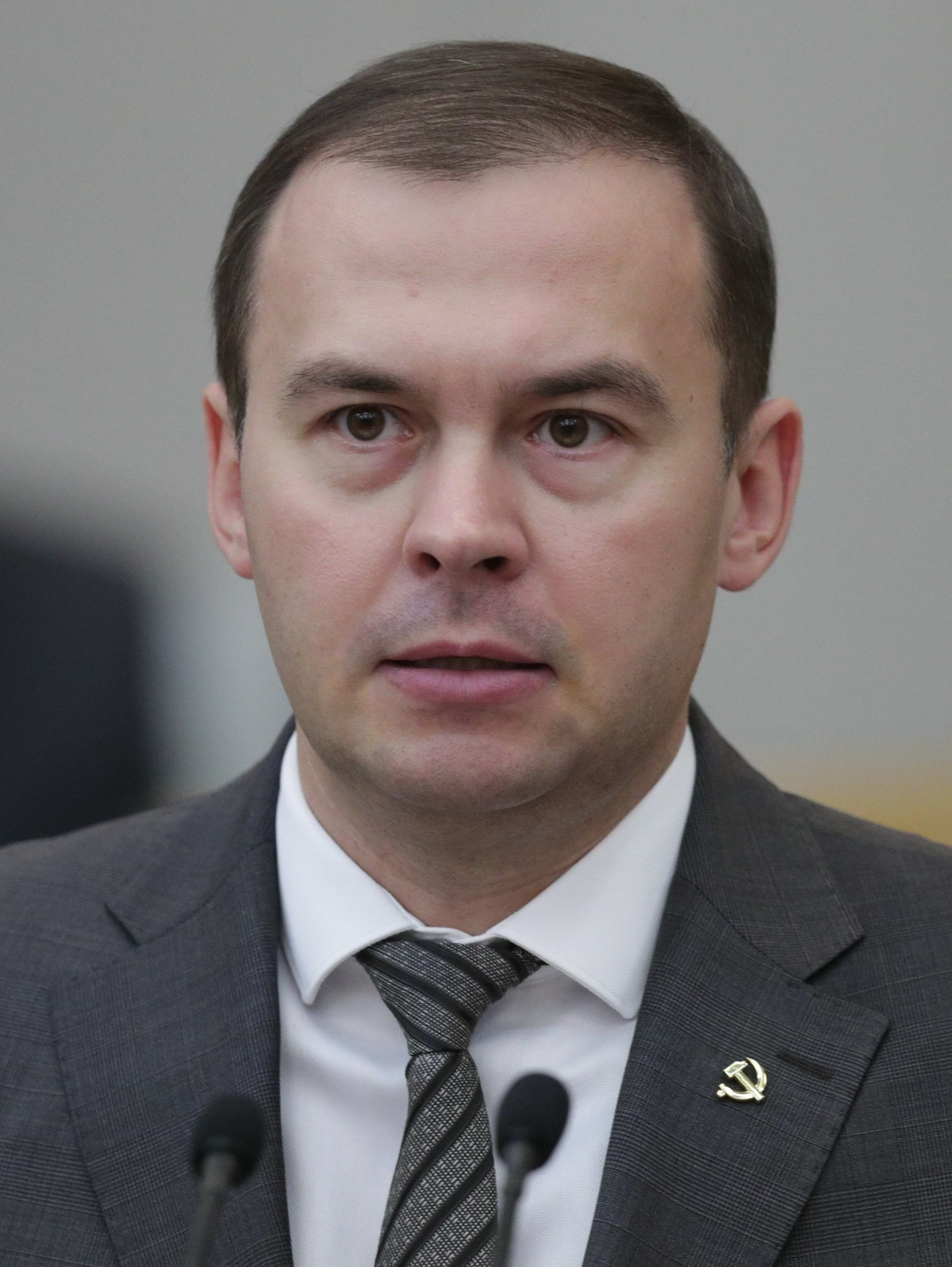
- Afonin in 2019

Member of the State Duma (Party List Seat)
- Incumbent
- Assumed office 24 December 2007

First Deputy Chairman of the CPRF Central Committee
- Incumbent
- Assumed office 24 April 2021 Serving with Ivan Melnikov
- Chairman: Gennady Zyuganov

Personal details
- Born: 22 March 1977 (age 49) Tula, RSFSR, USSR
- Party: Communist Party of the Russian Federation
- Education: Tula State Pedagogical University; Russian Academy of Public Administration
- Website: kprf.ru/personal/afonin

Yury Vyacheslavovich Afonin (Russian: Ю́рий Вячесла́вович Афо́нин; born 22 March 1977) is a Russian politician and member of the State Duma of the Russian Federation for the Communist Party of the Russian Federation. He is also a member of the board of the Youth Public Chamber of Russia.

== Biography ==
Afonin was born in Tula, Russian SFSR, Soviet Union on 22 March 1977. He studied history at the Tula State Pedagogical University named for Leo Tolstoy, and then obtained a law degree from the Russian Academy of Public Administration, a predecessor of the Russian Academy of National Economy and Public Administration (RANEPA).

From 2003 until 2014, Afonin worked as the First Secretary of the Leninist Komsomol of the Russian Federation, the youth wing of the Communist Party of the Russian Federation.

In the 2007 Russian legislative election, he was elected to the 5th State Duma as a member of the CPRF party list, re-elected for the 6th Duma in the 2011 election, 7th Duma in 2016 election, and most recently the 8th State Duma in the 2021 election. As a deputy, he sits on the Security and Anti-Corruption Committee, the Defence Budgetary Commission, and the Commission for Deputy Income and Property Reporting.

== Political career ==
In 1998, he led efforts to restore the Komsomol organization in Tula Oblast.

From 1999 to 2000, he worked as a lead specialist in the Committee on Economics of the administration of Shchyokino and Shchyokinsky District, Tula Oblast.

Since 2002, he has served as secretary, and since 2008 as first secretary, of the Tula Regional Committee of the Communist Party of the Russian Federation (CPRF).

In November 2003, he was elected First Secretary of the Central Committee of the Union of Communist Youth.

In April 2004, at the plenary session of the Union of Komsomol Organizations, he was elected head of the executive committee of SKO-VLKSМ.

From 2004 to 2017, he was secretary of the Central Committee of the CPRF.

At the XIII Congress of the CPRF, held in Moscow on 29–30 November 2008, he was elected to the Secretariat of the Central Committee. At the XV Congress of the CPRF, held on 23–24 February 2013, he was elected a member of the Presidium of the Central Committee.

== Legislative activity ==
From 2007 to 2019, during his tenure as a deputy of the 5th, 6th, and 7th convocations of the State Duma, he co-authored 76 legislative initiatives and amendments to draft federal laws.

== Awards ==
- Certificate of Honour of the President of the Russian Federation (21 August 2018) — for contributions to the preparation and organization of the 19th World Festival of Youth and Students, held in Sochi in 2017.
- Commendation of the Government of the Russian Federation (16 December 2019) — for a significant contribution to the development of Russian parliamentarism and active legislative work.

== Sanctions ==
On March 11, 2022, the United States imposed sanctions on 12 State Duma deputies involved in the recognition of the independence of the LPR and DPR, including Afonin. On March 15, Japan introduced similar sanctions. As of December 2022, he is under sanctions imposed by Australia, the United Kingdom, Canada, the United States, France, Switzerland, Ukraine, New Zealand, Belgium, Japan, and the European Union.
