= Smart Voting =

Tactical voting strategy

- Native name: Умное голосование Umnoye golosovaniye
- Available in: Russia
- Founded: 28 November 2018; 7 years ago
- Creator: Alexei Navalny
- Founder: Anti-Corruption Foundation
- Website: votesmart.appspot.com

Smart Voting (Russian: Умное голосование, romanized: Umnoye golosovaniye) is a tactical voting strategy put forward by the team of Alexei Navalny with the aim of depriving the ruling United Russia party of votes in regional and federal elections. The goal of Smart Voting is to consolidate the votes of those who oppose the party which Navalny dubbed as the "party of crooks and thieves".

== History ==
On 28 November 2018, Alexei Navalny launched the Smart Voting project. Initially, the system was mainly aimed at depriving the nominees from the politically dominant United Russia party of their victory in the elections to the post of Governor of St. Petersburg and the Moscow City Duma on 8 September 2019. Navalny explained the strategy as follows (translated from Russian): "The parties themselves cannot agree and nominate a single candidate against United Russia. But we can agree on this. We are different, but we have one policy — we are against the monopoly of United Russia. Everything else is mathematics. If we all act smartly and vote for the strongest candidate, he will win, and United Russia will lose."

=== Smart voting candidates in 2021 election ===
Party	No. of candidates
Communist Party	137
A Just Russia — For Truth	48
Liberal Democratic Party	20
Yabloko	10
New People	5
Russian Ecological Party "The Greens"	2
Communists of Russia	1
Party of Growth	1
Independent candidates	1

=== Smart voting candidates in 2026 election ===
Party	No. of candidates
Yabloko	81
Communist Party	65
New People	42
A Just Russia	13
Russian Ecological Party "The Greens"	2
Party of Pensioners	2
Liberal Democratic Party	1
No recommendation	19

== Reception ==
According to a research paper by political analysts Ivan Bolshakov and Vladimir Perevalov, Navalny’s Smart Voting strategy, on average, improved the results of opposition candidates by 5.6% in the September 2019 Moscow City Duma election. While Smart Voting played a decisive role in the victory of several candidates, it took away votes from approximately the same number of opposition representatives.

According to political scientist Abbas Gallyamov, the percentage of votes for United Russia in the Russian Public Opinion Research Center's forecast for the 2021 Russian legislative election is significantly overestimated and the percentage of votes for the Communist Party of the Russian Federation is significantly underestimated. For Gallyamov, no more than 26–27% of those who stand at the polls would vote for United Russia, and Smart Voting is a tool that could deliver a significant blow to the ruling party, which in his view explains why the authorities attacked it.

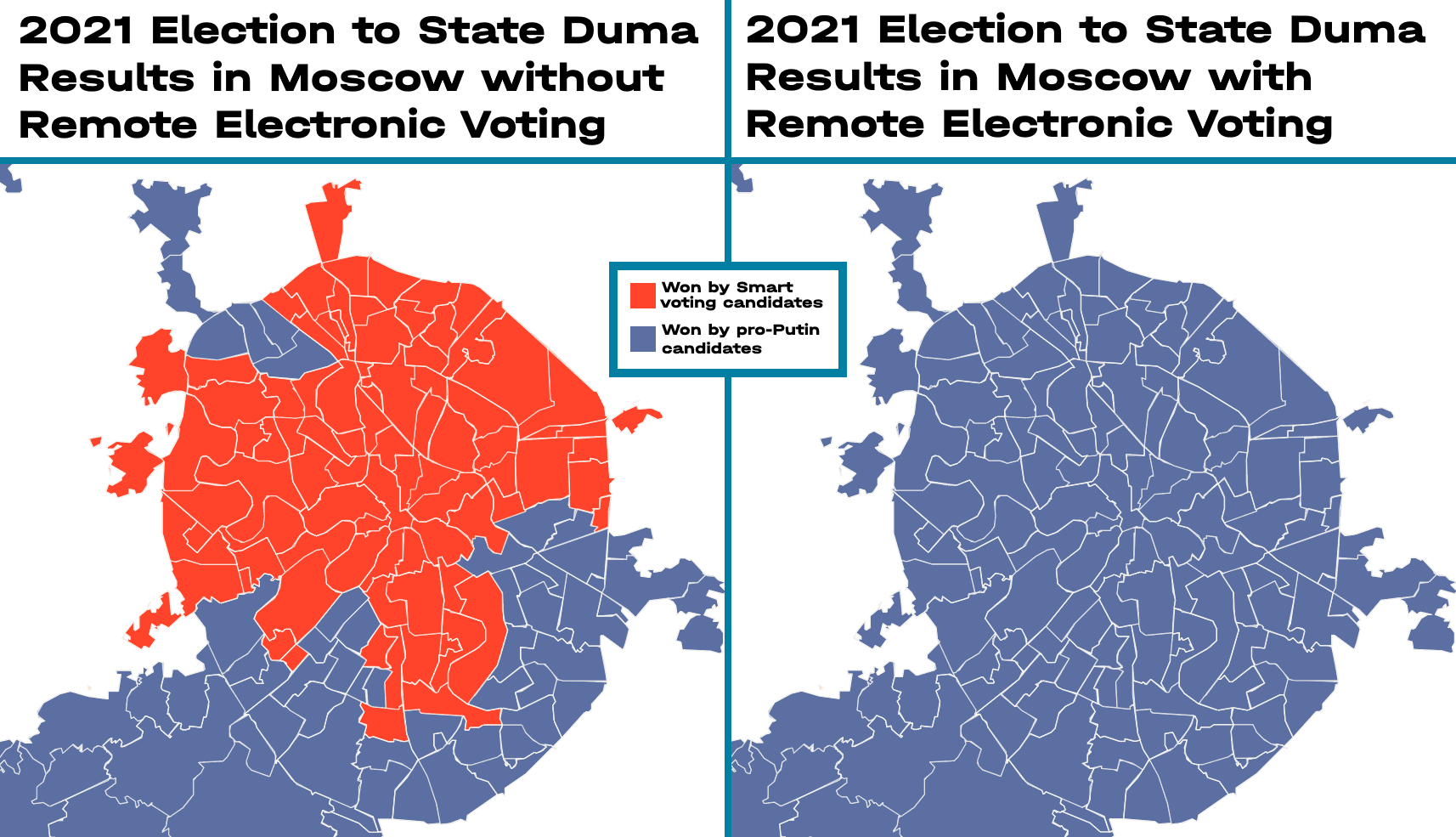
2021 Election to the State Duma with and without Remote Electronic Voting

== Censorship ==
Ahead of the State Duma election in September 2021, Roskomnadzor began to censor internet pages and content relating to Smart Voting, stating that it constituted the continued operations of the Anti-Corruption Foundation (which was designated as "extremist" in June 2021). It blacklisted websites related to Smart Voting as extremist materials, and attempted to use deep packet inspection to block IP addresses associated with Google App Engine and Google Public DNS to target Smart Voting (with the latter causing collateral damage to other services, such as the Central Bank of Russia).

On 15 September, regulators temporarily blocked Google Docs where the list of Smart Voting endorsements had been released. Navalny's team subsequently published the list to GitHub. On 17 September, Smart Voting apps were pulled from Apple and Google's app stores by order of Roskomnadzor, after it threatened the two companies with fines for election interference if they did not comply. Later that day, Telegram blocked a Smart Voting chatbot. Google Docs and YouTube removed content containing the Smart Voting lists following a Roskomnadzor demand on 18 September.

WoolInterlink—a Dagestan-based agricultural company whose owner was identified by BBC News Russian as having past ties to law enforcement agencies—was granted a trademark on "Smart Voting" and a similar logo. It used this trademark to obtain an injunction against Google and Yandex for alleged trademark infringement, requiring the search engines to block queries for "Smart Voting". It was found that Rospatent had expedited its trademark application process to quickly grant the Smart Voting trademark to WoolInterlink; the owner testified that they had applied for the mark "on a whim" with little explanation.
