= 9th State Duma =

Convocation of the lower house of Russian parliament

State Duma of the Federal Assembly of the Russian Federation of the 9th convocation
←	8th State Duma	10th State Duma	→
- Seat composition of the 9th State Duma

Overview
- Meeting place: State Duma building 1 Okhotny Ryad Street, Moscow
- Term: 30 September 2026 –
- Election: 17–19 September 2026
- Website: State Duma
- Members: 450 / 450
- Chairman: Vyacheslav Volodin (UR)
- First Deputy Chairmen: Irina Yarovaya (UR); Ivan Melnikov (CPRF)
- Deputy Chairmen: Anna Kuznetsova (UR); Vladimir Vasilyev (UR); Alexey Gordeyev (UR); Alexander Zhukov (UR); Vitaly Savelyev (UR); Viktoria Abramchenko (UR); Maria Voropayeva (LDPR); Vladislav Davankov (NP); Alexander Babakov (JR)
- Party control: Supermajority of United Russia (349)

The State Duma of the Federal Assembly of the Russian Federation of the 9th convocation (Russian: Государственная дума Федерального собрания Российской Федерации девятого созыва) is the convocation of the lower house of Russian parliament, elected during the legislative election in September 2026. Five parties were elected: United Russia, Communist Party of the Russian Federation, Liberal Democratic Party of Russia, New People and A Just Russia.

== Background ==
The 9th convocation of the State Duma of the Federal Assembly was elected in legislative election held from 18 to 20 September 2026. This was the first such election following the start of Russia's invasion of Ukraine.

== Election results ==
Results based on party lists indicate that the same five parties entered the State Duma, as in the 8th State Duma elected in 2021: United Russia, Communist Party, Liberal Democratic Party, New People and A Just Russia. United Russia secured 349 out of 450 seats, thereby obtaining a constitutional majority; this marked the party's best-ever result, surpassing the 343 seats won in the 2016 election.

The convocation is elected for a five-year term. Its inaugural session took place on 30 September 2026.

== Leadership ==
Chairman of the State Duma

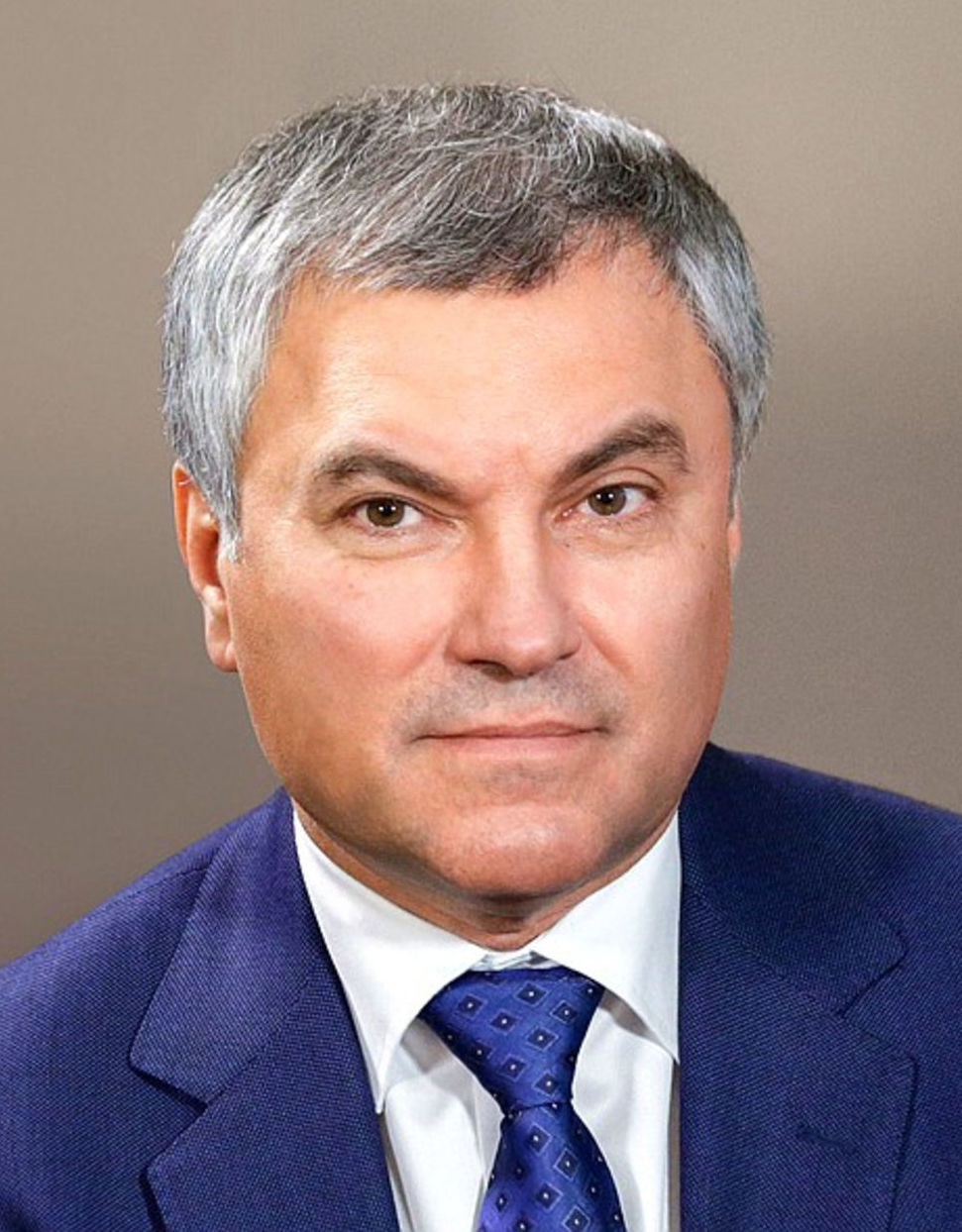
Vyacheslav Volodin (UR)

Faction leaders

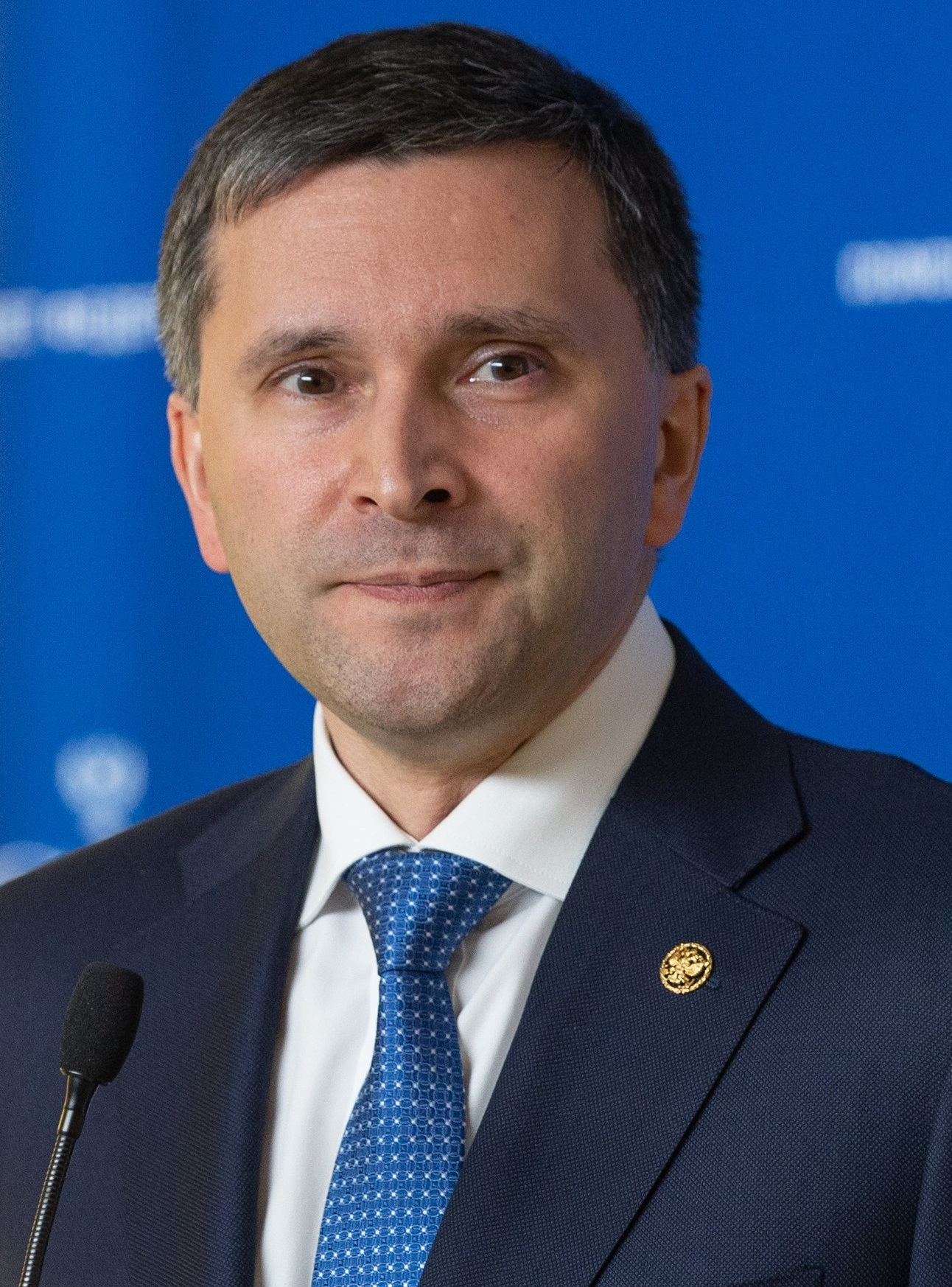
Dmitry Kobylkin
United Russia

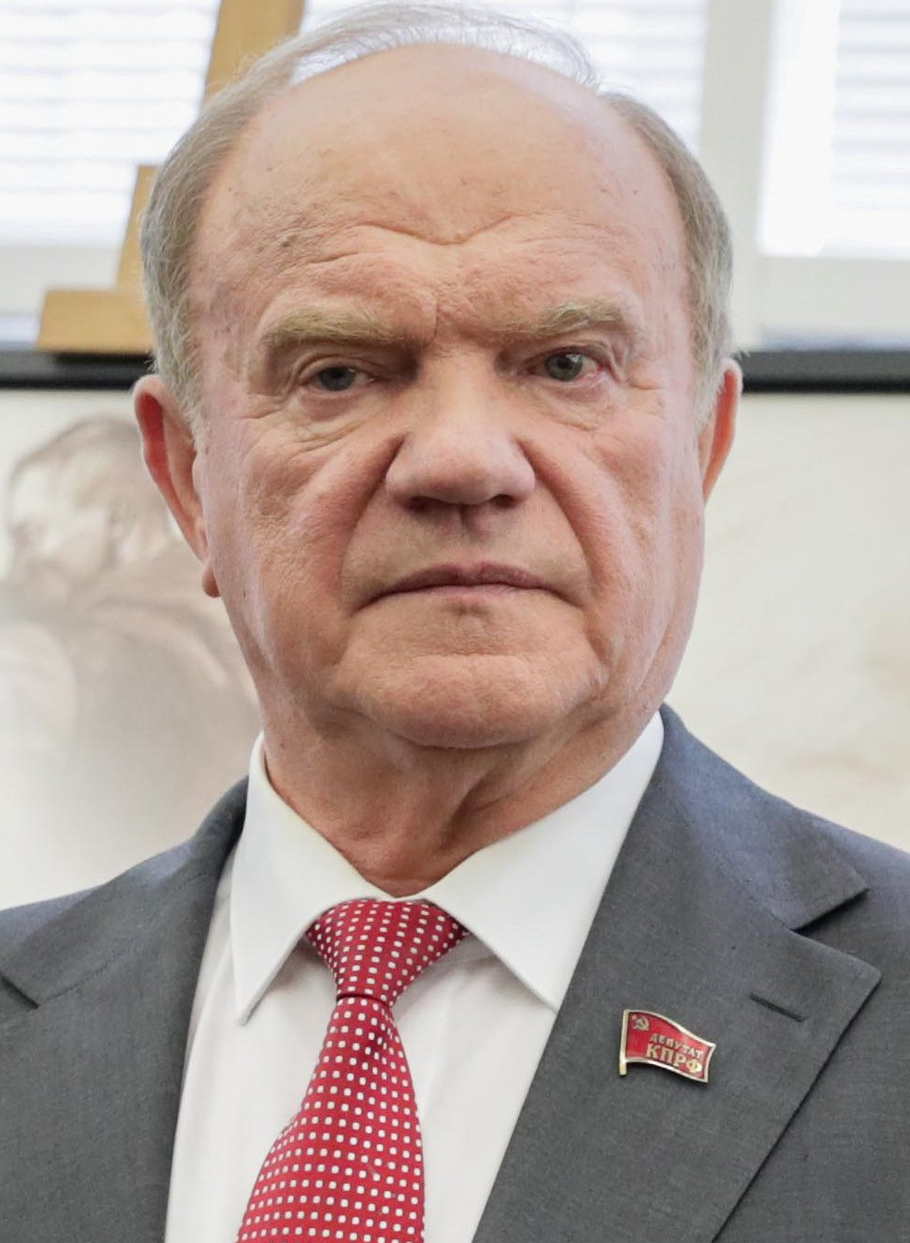
Gennady Zyuganov
Communist Party

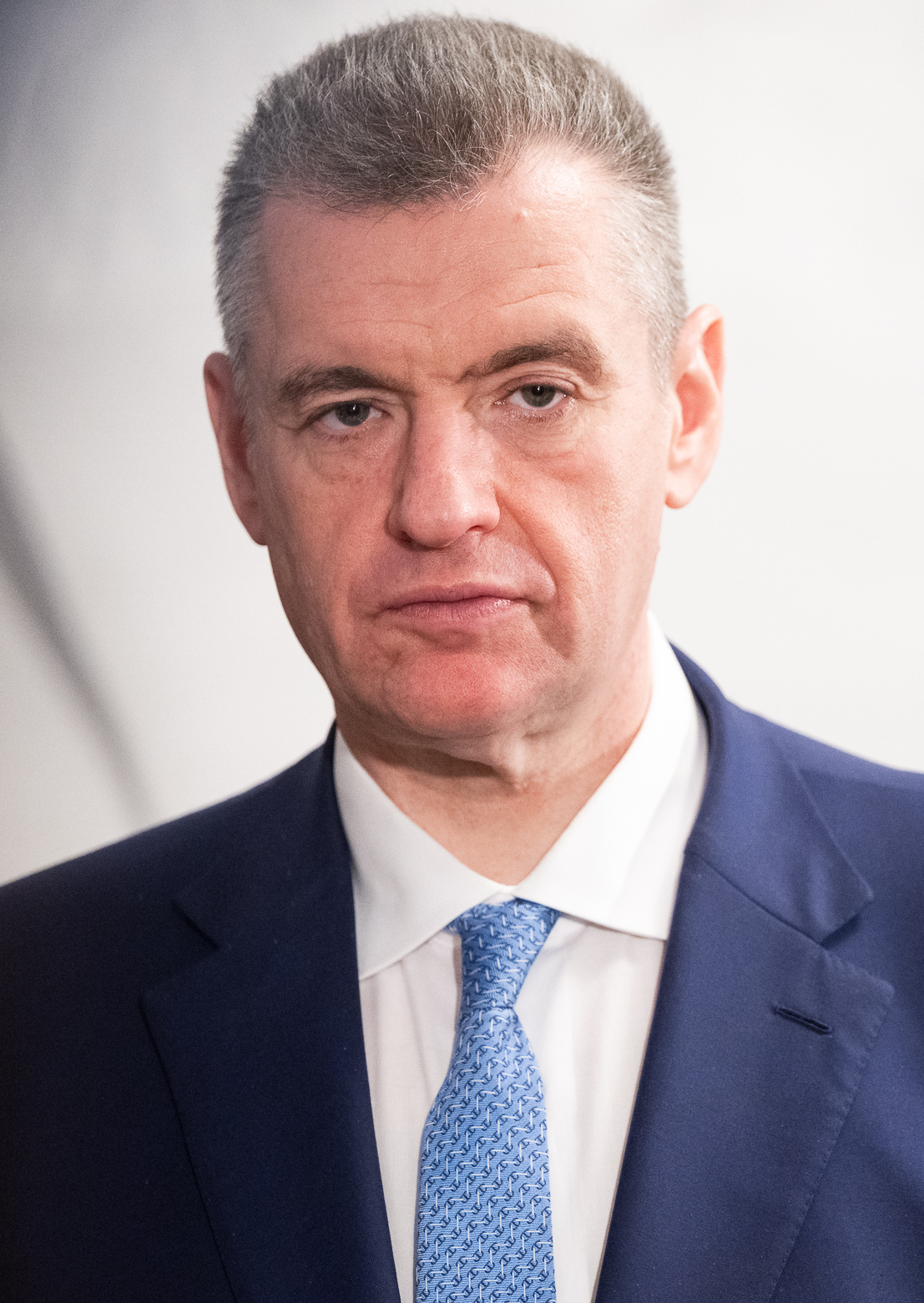
Leonid Slutsky
Liberal Democratic Party

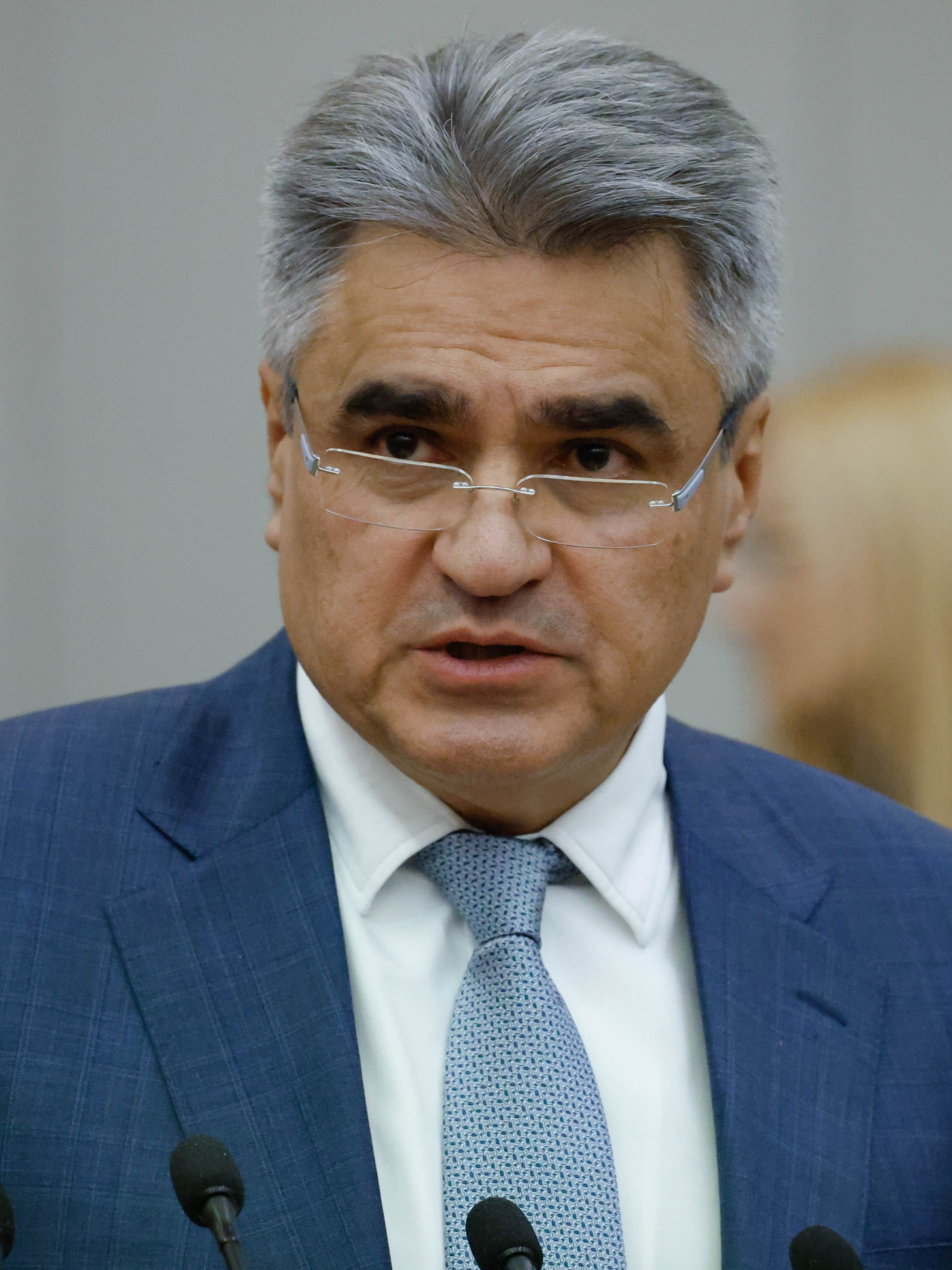
Alexey Nechayev
New People

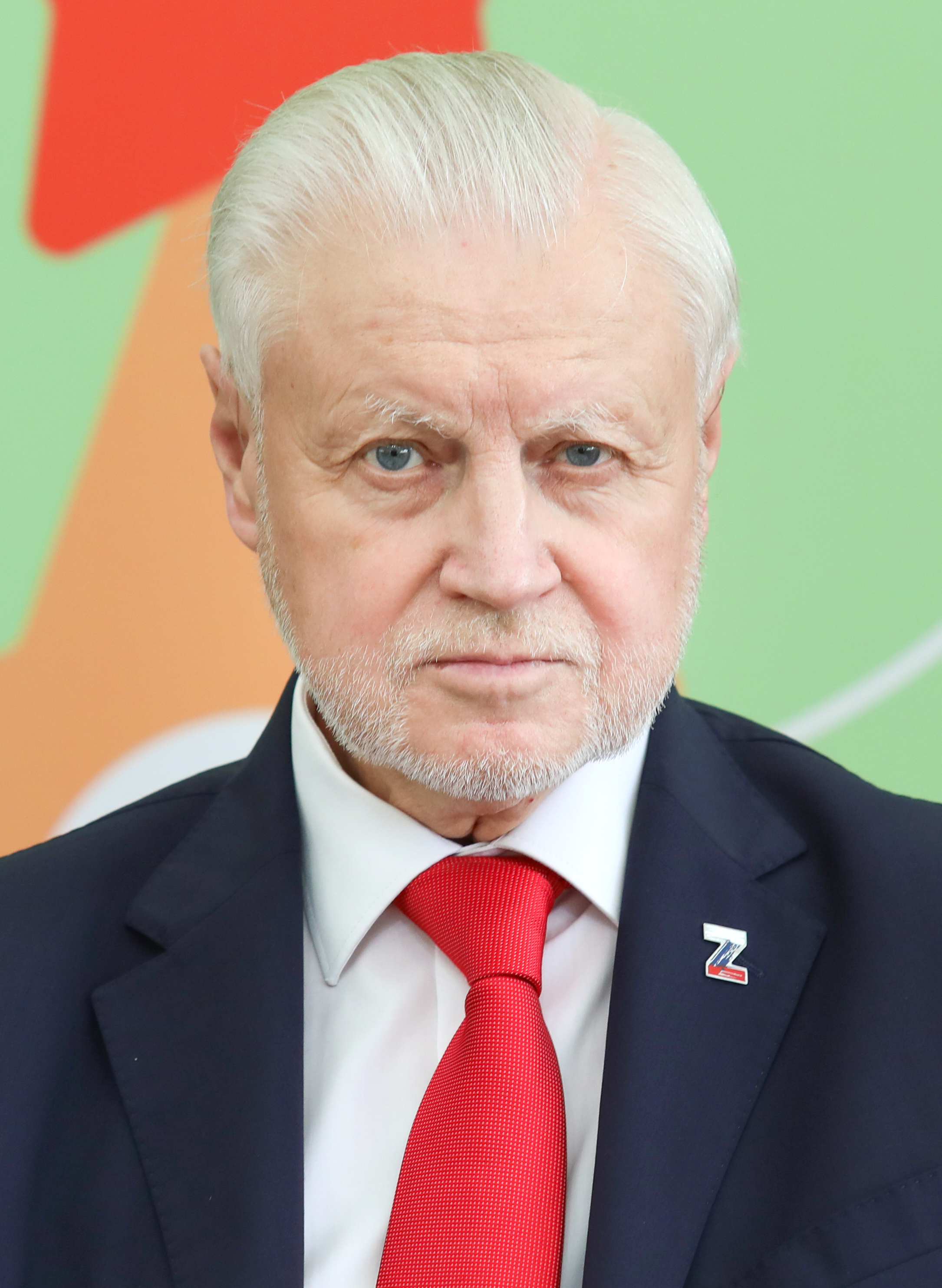
Sergey Mironov
A Just Russia

The Chairman of the State Duma and his deputies must be elected at the first meeting of the convocation. According to the constitution, the oldest deputy will open and conduct the first meeting. The first session was opened by 79‑year‑old Yury Petrov. At the same time, Petrov is not the oldest member of the State Duma. He ranks only fourth, after Vladimir Resin (90), Valentina Tereshkova (89) and Gennady Zyuganov (82).

Office	MP	Period	Parliamentary affiliation
Chairman	Vyacheslav Volodin	Since 30 September 2026	United Russia
First Deputy Chairmen	Irina Yarovaya	Since 30 September 2026	United Russia
First Deputy Chairmen	Ivan Melnikov	Since 30 September 2026	Communist Party
Deputy Chairmen	Anna Kuznetsova	Since 30 September 2026	United Russia
Deputy Chairmen	Vladimir Vasilyev	Since 30 September 2026	United Russia
Deputy Chairmen	Alexey Gordeyev	Since 30 September 2026	United Russia
Deputy Chairmen	Alexander Zhukov	Since 30 September 2026	United Russia
Deputy Chairmen	Vitaly Savelyev	Since 30 September 2026	United Russia
Deputy Chairmen	Viktoria Abramchenko	Since 30 September 2026	United Russia
Deputy Chairmen	Maria Voropayeva	Since 30 September 2026	Liberal Democratic Party
Deputy Chairmen	Vladislav Davankov	Since 30 September 2026	New People
Deputy Chairmen	Alexander Babakov	Since 30 September 2026	A Just Russia
Faction leaders	Dmitry Kobylkin	Since 30 September 2026	United Russia
Faction leaders	Gennady Zyuganov	Since 30 September 2026	Communist Party
Faction leaders	Leonid Slutsky	Since 30 September 2026	Liberal Democratic Party
Faction leaders	Alexey Nechayev	Since 30 September 2026	New People
Faction leaders	Sergey Mironov	Since 30 September 2026	A Just Russia

=== Chairman election ===
Two candidates were nominated for the election of the chairman of the State Duma: Vyacheslav Volodin and Dmitry Novikov. This will be their third contest in the election of the chairman of the State Duma, as they were also candidates in 2016 and 2021.

Since United Russia holds an absolute majority of the deputies' votes, Volodin was easily elected chairman of the State Duma for a record third term. Volodin's candidacy was supported by Liberal Democratic Party, New People and A Just Russia. President Vladimir Putin also supported Volodin’s nomination.

==== Nominees ====
- United Russia: Vyacheslav Volodin, incumbent chairman, deputy for Saratov constituency.
- Communist party: Dmitry Novikov, deputy for Communist party list.

==== Result ====
Candidate	Votes	%
✓ Vyacheslav Volodin (UR)	406	90.2%
Dmitry Novikov (CPRF)	36	8.0%
Not voting	8	1.8%

== Composition ==
=== Factions ===
United Russia secured the highest number of seats in its history: the party's previous highs were 343 seats in 2016 and 315 in 2007, whereas in 2021 it won 324 seats. Party candidates won in 208 out of 225 single-mandate constituencies—compared to 198 five years earlier—including in Khabarovsk Krai, Yakutia, Mari El, and the Nenets Autonomous Okrug, where the party had lost in 2021. The CPRF retained second place, though its representation shrank from 57 to 38 seats, and the number of constituencies won fell from nine to five. The LDPR increased its seat count from 21 to 24, while "New People"—which did not win a single constituency—went from 13 to 19 seats. A Just Russia secured 16 seats, down from 27 in 2021: on the morning of September 21, after 94.95% of protocols had been processed, the party was polling at 4.96% and only cleared the threshold after 96.95% of protocols had been processed. Four independent candidates and a candidate from the Rodina party won in single-mandate constituencies.

The factions, their composition, and their numbers were approved on 30 September 2026.

	(Shading indicates majority caucus)						Total	Vacant
	United Russia	Communist Party	Liberal Democratic Party	New People	A Just Russia	Unaffiliated (Note: Independent deputies and members of other parties)	Total	Vacant
End of the previous convocation	309	56	22	15	27	4	433	17
Seats won in election	349	37	23	19	17	5	450	0
September 30, 2026 (first session)	350	37	24	20	17	2	450	0
Latest voting share	77.8%	8.2%	5.3%	4.4%	3.8%	0.4%	100.0%	0.0%

=== Deputies ===
Of the 434 deputies of the 8th convocation who held their seats as of August 2026, 317 ran in the elections for the 9th convocation. Among the deputies elected in districts within the annexed territories were Irina Kuksenova (Makeyevka District No. 13) and Sergey Makarov (Gorlovka District No. 15), both representing United Russia. According to preliminary data from United Russia, its parliamentary faction will include 46 to 49 participants in the war against Ukraine—a conflict Russian authorities term a "Special military operation". The party had previously cited the figure of 86, but RIA Novosti removed the report containing that number at the request of the party's press service.

Regional groups within the United Russia party list were headed by 55 governors; notably, none of the heads of the annexed regions served in this capacity. Such candidates—known as "locomotives"—do not intend to take up parliamentary seats and instead relinquish their mandates to the next candidates on the list; for instance, on September 21, Kirov Oblast Governor Alexander Sokolov announced he was declining his seat. The party's federal list was headed by Foreign Minister Sergey Lavrov, Moscow Mayor Sergey Sobyanin, war correspondent Yevgeny Poddubny, Presidential Commissioner for Children's Rights Maria Lvova-Belova, and Yunarmiya leader Vladislav Golovin. Over the preceding twenty years, only Anna Kuznetsova—among the leaders of United Russia's federal lists—had actually assumed a parliamentary seat following the elections. Of the top five candidates from United Russia's list which included Russian Foreign Minister Sergey Lavrov, Moscow Mayor Sergey Sobyanin, war correspondent Yevgeny Poddubny, Russia’s Commissioner for Children’s Rights Maria Lvova-Belova and Yunarmiya chief Vladislav Golovin, only the latter became a deputy with the other four candidates declined their seat. The average age of the deputies is 54.3. The youngest lawmaker in the new Duma is Georgy Arapov, the former head of New People’s regional branch in Irkutsk region, who turned 27 in September 2026 and the oldest one is Vladimir Resin who turned 90 in February 2026. More than half the lawmakers in the current Duma, 269 out of 450, also served in the previous session, and 143 took part in all three of the last sessions. A total of 172 people received a Duma mandate for the first time in 2026. The 9th State Duma comprises 225 deputies elected from single-mandate constituencies and 225 deputies elected from five political party lists—consisting of federal and regional segments—representing United Russia (57), the CPRF (36), the LDPR (35), A Just Russia (37), and New People (37).

== Committees and commissions ==
=== Committees ===
In the 9th State Duma, 34 committees were formed, and their heads were approved on 30 September 2026. Traditionally, despite the absolute majority held by United Russia, the positions of heads of some committees (namely, 14) were given to representatives of other parties.

Committee issues	Chair	Parties
Agrarian Issues	Vladimir Kashin (CPRF)	TBD
Budget and Taxes	Andrey Makarov (UR)	TBD
Commonwealth of Independent States Affairs, Eurasian Integration and Relations with Compatriots	Leonid Kalashnikov (CPRF)	TBD
Construction and Housing and Communal Services	Sergey Pakhomov (UR)	TBD
Control	Oleg Morozov (UR)	TBD
Culture	Olga Kazakova (UR)	TBD
Defence	Vladimir Kasatonov (UR)	TBD
Development of Civil Society, Issues of Public and Religious Associations	Boris Chernyshov (LDPR)	TBD
Development of the Far East and Arctic	Nikolai Kharitonov (CPRF)	TBD
Digital Development and Artificial Intelligence	Aleksandr Sidyakin (UR)	TBD
Ecology, Natural Resources and Environmental Protection	Yelena Panova (NP)	TBD
Economic Policy	Maxim Topilin (UR)	TBD
Education	Irina Belykh (UR)	TBD
Energy	Nikolay Shulginov (UR)	TBD
Protection of the Family, Paternity, Maternity, and Childhood	Nina Ostanina (CPRF)	TBD
Financial Market	Anatoly Aksakov (JR)	TBD
Health	Vladimir Sysoyev (LDPR)	TBD
Industry and Trade	Vladimir Gutenev (UR)	TBD
Information Policy, Information Technologies and Communications	Sergey Boyarsky (UR)	TBD
International Affairs	Pyotr Tolstoy (UR)	TBD
Labour, Social Policy and Veterans' Affairs	Eleonora Kavshar (LDPR)	TBD
Nationalities Affairs	Vladimir Ivanov (UR)	TBD
Physical Culture and Sport	Oleg Matytsin (UR)	TBD
Property, Land and Property Relations	Sergei Gavrilov (CPRF)	TBD
Protection of Competition	Valery Gartung (JR)	TBD
Regional Policy and Local Government	Irina Guseva (UR)	TBD
Safety and Anti-Corruption	Vasily Piskarev (UR)	TBD
Science and Higher Education	Sergey Kabyshev (JR)	TBD
Small and Medium-sized Entrepreneurship	Stanislav Druzhinin (NP)	TBD
Constitutional Civil Legislation and Judiciary	Pavel Krasheninnikov (UR)	TBD
Criminal and Administrative Legislation	Yury Petrov (UR)	TBD
Tourism and Tourism Infrastructure Development	Timur Kanokov (NP)	TBD
Transport and Transport Infrastructure Development	Yevgeny Moskvichev (UR)	TBD
Youth Policy	Vladislav Golovin (UR)	TBD

=== Commissions ===
Commission issues	Chair	Parties
Control Over the Reliability of Information on Income, Property and Property Obligations; Submitted by Members of the State Duma and Mandate Issues	Ernest Valeev (UR)	TBD
Ensuring the Housing Rights of Citizens	Dmitry Svishchev (LDPR)	TBD
Parliamentary Ethics	Valentina Tereshkova (UR)	TBD
Regulations and Ensuring the Activities of the State Duma	Viktor Pinsky (UR)	TBD

== Major appointments ==
=== Cabinet ===
==== Second Mishustin Cabinet ====
- October 22, 2026: Irina Okladnikova approved as Deputy Prime Minister of Russia – Chief of Staff of the Government with 430 votes in favor.
- October 22, 2026: Oleg Kozhemyako approved as Deputy Prime Minister of Russia – Presidential Envoy to the Far Eastern Federal District with 430 votes in favor.
- October 22, 2026: Andrey Nikitin approved as Deputy Prime Minister of Russia with 430 votes in favor.
- October 22, 2026: Anton Siluanov approved as Deputy Prime Minister of Russia with 430 votes in favor.
- October 22, 2026: Dmitry Yadrov approved as Minister of Transport of Russia with 430 votes in favor.

== Major events ==
- September 30, 2026: Opening of the 9th State Duma. According to the rules of procedure, Vladimir Resin who is the oldest member of the State Duma is supposed to open the session, yet he ceded his right to Yuri Petrov instead.

== See also ==
- 2026 Russian legislative election
