= 7th State Duma =

Former convocation of the lower house of Russian parliament

State Duma of the Federal Assembly of the Russian Federation of the 7th convocation
←	6th State Duma	8th State Duma	→
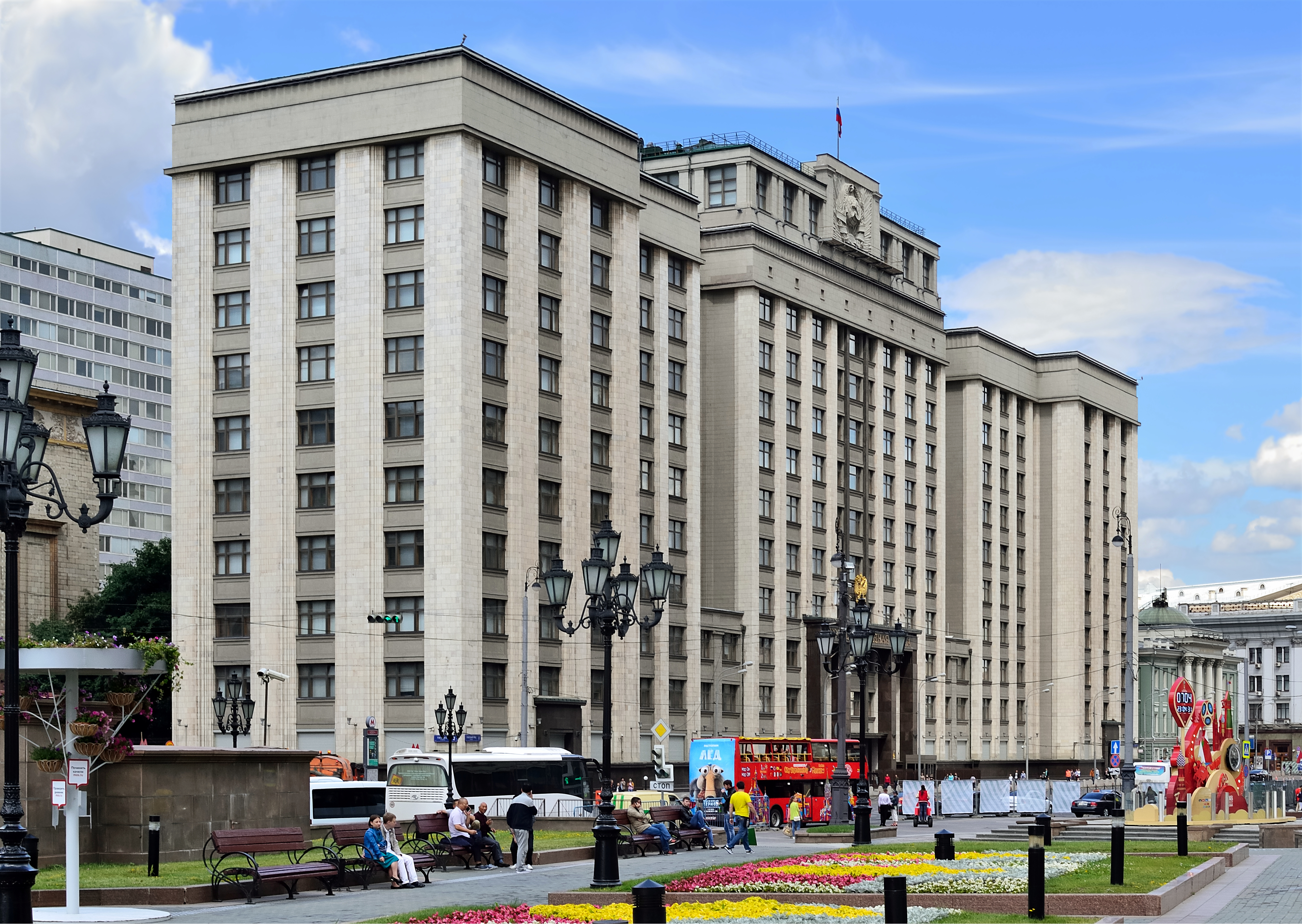
- Building of the State Duma

Overview
- Meeting place: State Duma building 1 Okhotny Ryad Street, Moscow
- Term: 5 October 2016 – 12 October 2021
- Election: 18 September 2016
- Website: State Duma
- Members: 444 / 450
- Chairman: Vyacheslav Volodin
- First Deputy Chairmen: Alexander Zhukov; Ivan Melnikov
- Deputy Chairmen: List: Alexey Gordeyev Irina Yarovaya Pyotr Tolstoy Olga Timofeeva Sergey Neverov Vladimir Vasilyev Igor Lebedev Olga Yepifanova Igor Ananskikh
- Party control: United Russia (336)

The State Duma of the Federal Assembly of the Russian Federation of the 7th convocation (Russian: Государственная Дума Федерального Собрания Российской Федерации седьмого созыва) is a former convocation of the lower house of Russian parliament.

The composition of the 7th State Duma was based on the results of the 2016 parliamentary election. Elections were held using a mixed system: 225 deputies were elected on party lists and 225 — in single-member constituencies. Of the 14 parties participating in the elections, only four were able to overcome the required 5% electoral threshold. Two more parties and one independent candidate were able to enter the State Duma via single-mandate constituencies.

== Leadership ==
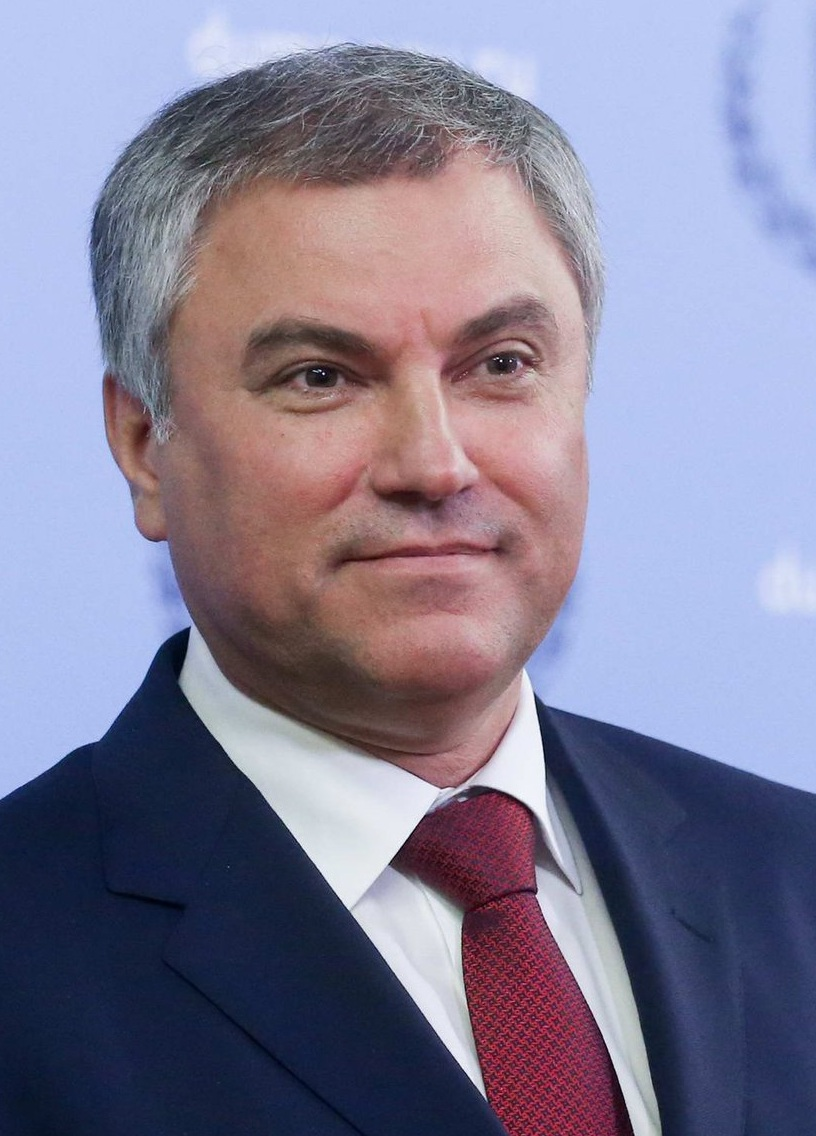
Chairman Vyacheslav Volodin (UR)

Faction leaders

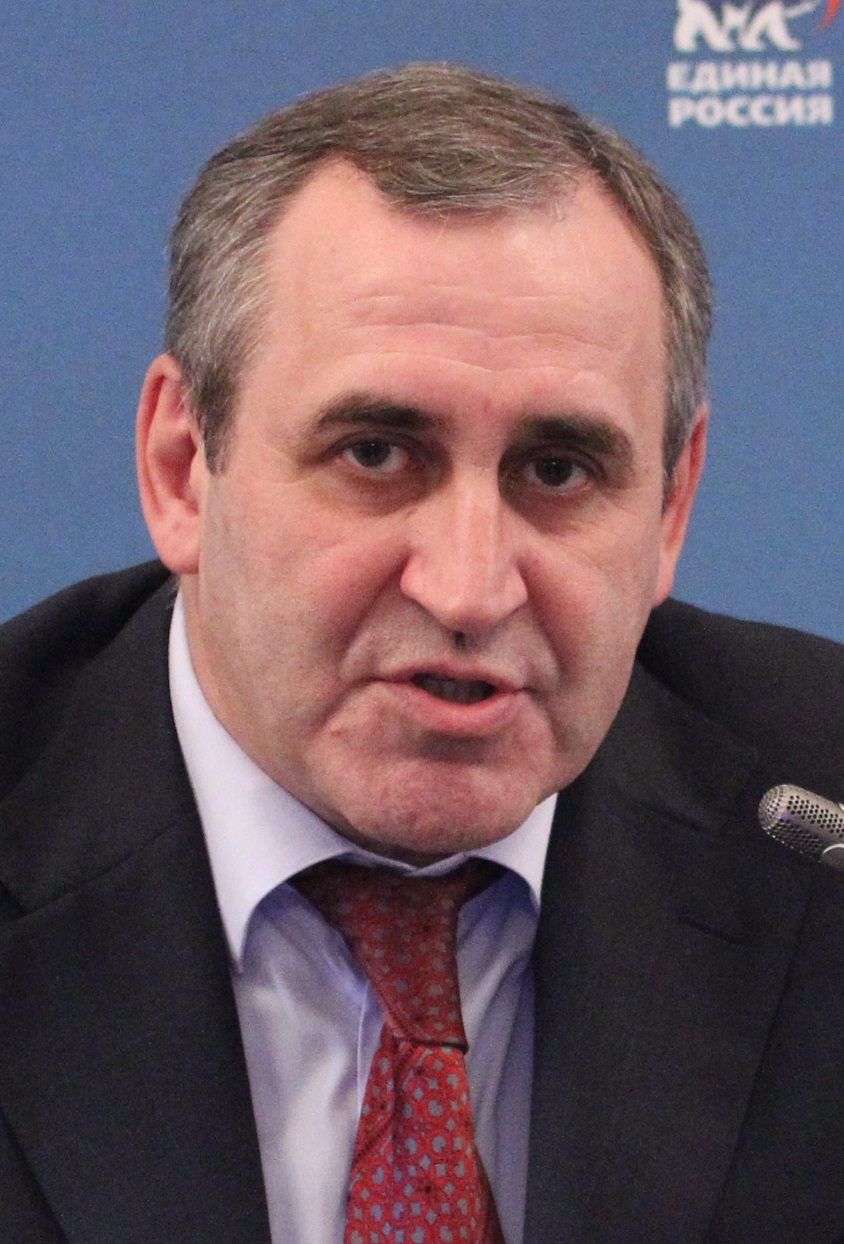
Sergey Neverov
United Russia

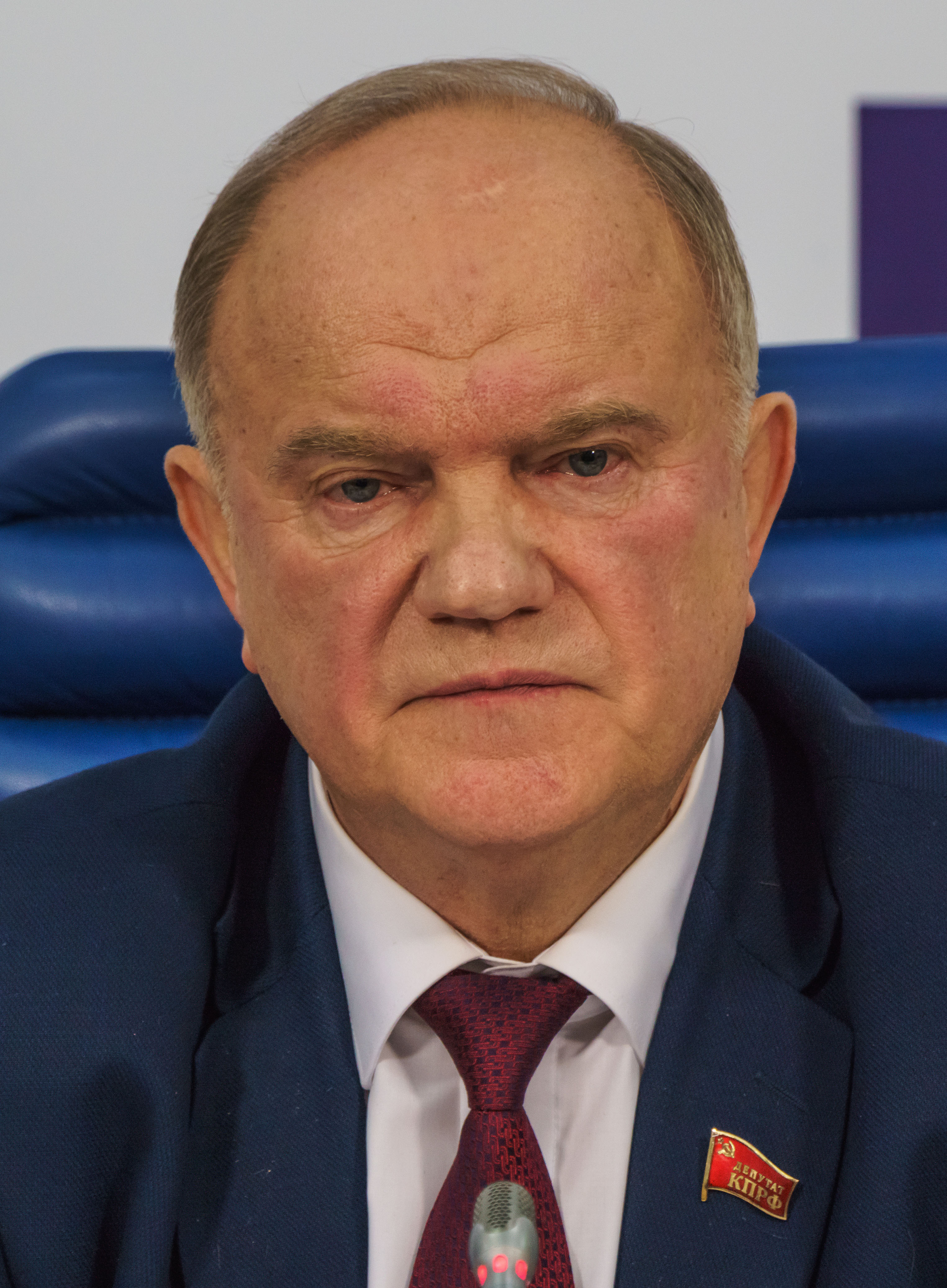
Gennady Zyuganov
Communist Party

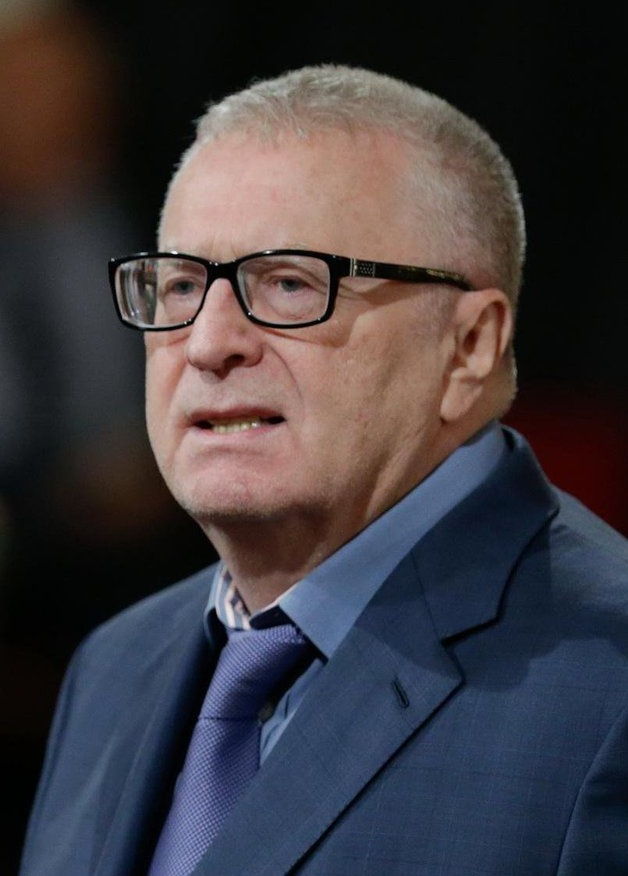
Vladimir Zhirinovsky
Liberal Democratic Party

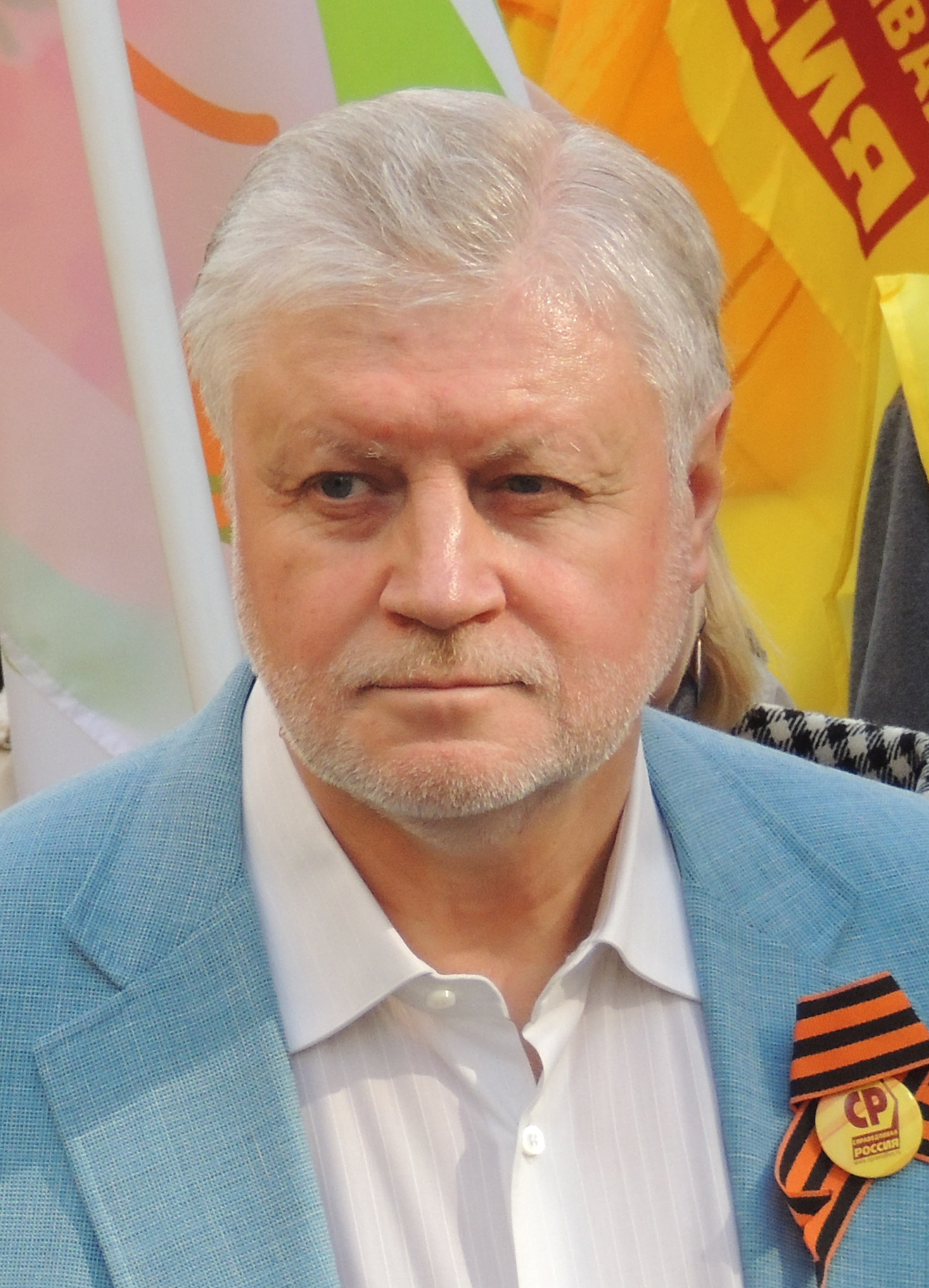
Sergey Mironov
A Just Russia

The first meeting, according to tradition, was held by its eldest deputy, 86-year-old Zhores Alferov (CPRF). Alferov was joined on the podium by other elder deputies Valentina Tereshkova (UR), Vladimir Zhirinovsky (LDPR), Galina Khovanskaya (SR).

On 5 October 2016, Vyacheslav Volodin was elected Chairman of the State Duma.

Office	MP	Period	Parliamentary affiliation
Chairman	Vyacheslav Volodin	October 5, 2016 — September 19, 2021	United Russia
First Deputy Chairmen	Alexander Zhukov	October 5, 2016 — September 19, 2021	United Russia
First Deputy Chairmen	Ivan Melnikov	October 5, 2016 — September 19, 2021	Communist Party
Deputy Chairmen	Sergey Neverov	October 5, 2016 — February 13, 2020	United Russia
Deputy Chairmen	Irina Yarovaya	October 5, 2016 — September 19, 2021	United Russia
Deputy Chairmen	Pyotr Tolstoy	October 5, 2016 — September 19, 2021	United Russia
Deputy Chairmen	Vladimir Vasilyev	October 5, 2016 — October 3, 2017	United Russia
Deputy Chairmen	Olga Timofeeva	October 11, 2017 — September 19, 2021	United Russia
Deputy Chairmen	Alexey Gordeyev	February 13, 2020 — September 19, 2021	United Russia
Deputy Chairmen	Igor Lebedev	October 5, 2016 — September 19, 2021	Liberal Democratic Party
Deputy Chairmen	Olga Yepifanova	October 5, 2016 — September 29, 2020	A Just Russia
Deputy Chairmen	Igor Ananskikh	September 30, 2020 — September 19, 2021	A Just Russia
Faction leaders	Vladimir Vasilyev	October 5, 2016 — October 3, 2017	United Russia
Faction leaders	Sergey Neverov	October 9, 2017 — September 19, 2021	United Russia
Faction leaders	Gennady Zyuganov	October 5, 2016 — September 19, 2021	Communist Party
Faction leaders	Vladimir Zhirinovsky	October 5, 2016 — September 19, 2021	Liberal Democratic Party
Faction leaders	Sergey Mironov	October 5, 2016 — September 19, 2021	A Just Russia

=== Election of Chairman ===
On 23 September 2016, President Vladimir Putin proposed that United Russia nominate Vyacheslav Volodin to the post of Chairman of the State Duma. The majority leader Vladimir Vasilyev said that the United Russia faction will support the candidacy of Volodin. On 24 September, United Russia approved candidates for the posts of chairman and Vice Chairmen of the State Duma. The heads of the Liberal Democratic Party and A Just Russia factions also announced their support for Volodin.

The Communist Party nominated Dmitry Novikov for the position of Chairman of the State Duma.

Candidate	Votes	%
√ Vyacheslav Volodin (UR) (Note: Supported by Liberal Democratic Party and A Just Russia)	404	89.8%
Dmitry Novikov (CPRF)	40	8.9%
Not voting	6	1.3%

== Factions ==
Location of parliamentary factions in the 7th State Duma: United Russia (336) Communist Party (43) / Liberal Democratic Party (40) A Just Russia (22) / Unaffiliated (2) Vacant (6)

After the election, four parliamentary factions formed. The largest fraction consists of 335 Deputies, consisting of 334 deputies from United Russia and one Independent Deputy. United Russia increased the number of their faction by more than 100 seats, thus obtaining a constitutional majority (2/3 of seats). In first time since 2007, two small parties were also able to pass in addition to the four major parties in the State Duma. Both parties have one Deputy, and they are not included in one of the factions. The Rodina party received representation in the State Duma, the first since 2003. Also in the State Duma was the party of Civic Platform, which participated in the elections for the first time.

	(Shading indicates majority caucus)					Total	Vacant
	United Russia (Note: 335 deputies from United Russia and one Independent deputy)	Communist Party	Liberal Democratic Party	A Just Russia	Unaffiliated (Note: One deputy from Rodina and one from Civic Platform)	Total	Vacant
End of previous convocation	238	92	56	64	DNP	450	0
Seats won in 2016 election	343	42	39	23	3	450	0
October 5, 2016	343	42	39	23	2	449	1
June 9, 2017	342	42	39	23	2	448	2
June 17, 2017	341	42	39	23	2	447	3
September 10, 2017	342	42	40	23	2	449	1
October 3, 2017	341	42	40	23	2	448	2
October 6, 2017	340	42	40	23	2	447	3
January 17, 2018	339	42	40	23	2	446	4
May 10, 2018	338	42	40	23	2	445	5
June 13, 2018	337	42	39	23	2	443	7
August 11, 2018	336	42	39	23	2	442	8
September 9, 2018	341	43	40	23	2	449	1
September 27, 2018	341	43	39	23	2	448	2
December 13, 2018	340	43	39	23	2	447	3
April 5, 2019	339	43	39	23	2	446	4
July 10, 2019	338	43	39	23	2	445	5
September 8, 2019	341	43	40	23	2	449	1
January 22, 2020	341	43	40	22	2	448	2
January 23, 2020	340	43	40	22	2	447	3
February 7, 2020	339	43	40	22	2	446	4
June 25, 2020	338	43	40	22	2	445	5
July 24, 2020	337	43	40	22	2	444	6
September 13, 2020	340	43	40	23	2	448	2
September 22, 2020	338	43	40	23	2	446	4
September 29, 2020	337	43	40	23	2	445	5
December 24, 2020	336	43	40	23	2	444	6
Latest voting share	74.7%	9.6%	8.9%	5.1%	0.4%	98.7%	1.3%

== Committees and Commissions ==
=== Committees ===
On September 26, 2016, fractions distributed positions of heads of committees.

Committees	Leader	Party
On Constitutional Legislation and State Building	Pavel Krasheninnikov	United Russia
On Information Policy, Information Technologies and Communications	Leonid Levin (until January 22, 2020)	A Just Russia
On Information Policy, Information Technologies and Communications	Alexander Khinshtein (since January 22, 2020)	United Russia
On Labour, Social Policy and Veterans' Affairs	Yaroslav Nilov	Liberal Democratic Party
On Budget and Tax	Andrey Makarov	United Russia
On Financial Market	Anatoly Aksakov	A Just Russia
On Industry, Economic Policy, Innovative Development and Entrepreneurship	Sergey Zhigarev	Liberal Democratic Party
On Energy	Pavel Zavalny	United Russia
On Transport and Construction	Yevgeny Moskvichev	United Russia
On Culture	Stanislav Govorukhin (until June 14, 2018)	United Russia
On Culture	Yelena Yampolskaya (since 25 July 2018)	United Russia
On Defence	Vladimir Shamanov	United Russia
On Safety and Anti-Corruption	Vasily Piskarev	United Russia
On International Affairs	Leonid Slutsky	Liberal Democratic Party
On Commonwealth of Independent States Affairs, Eurasian Integration and Relations with Compatriots	Leonid Kalashnikov	Communist Party
On the Federal Structure and Local Government	Alexei Didenko	Liberal Democratic Party
On Regional Policy and the problems of the North and the Far East	Nikolai Kharitonov	Communist Party
On Agrarian Issues	Vladimir Kashin	Communist Party
On Natural Resources	Nikolay Nikolaev	United Russia
On Ecology and Environmental Protection	Olga Timofeeva (until October 11, 2017)	United Russia
On Ecology and Environmental Protection	Vladimir Burmatov (since October 11, 2017)	United Russia
On Education and Science	Vyacheslav Nikonov	United Russia
For Nationalities	Ildar Gilmutdinov (until January 22, 2020)	United Russia
For Nationalities	Oleg Nikolaev (January 22–29, 2020)	A Just Russia
For Nationalities	Valery Gazzaev (since February 4, 2020)	A Just Russia
On Health	Dmitry Morozov	United Russia
On Physical Culture, Sport and Youth Affairs	Mikhail Degtyarev (until July 20, 2020)	Liberal Democratic Party
On Physical Culture, Sport and Youth Affairs	Boris Paikin (since July 21, 2020)	Liberal Democratic Party
On Housing Policy and Housing and Communal Services	Galina Khovanskaya	A Just Russia
On Rules and Organization of the State Duma	Olga Savastianova	United Russia
On Public Associations and Religious Organizations	Sergey Gavrilov	Communist Party
On Women, Family and Children	Tamara Pletnyova	Communist Party

=== Commissions ===
Commissions	Leader	Party
Counting commission	Ildar Gilmutdinov	United Russia
On issues of parliamentary ethics, control over reliability of data on incomes, about property and obligations of property character, represented by deputies of the State Duma	Otari Arshba (since 19 September 2018)	United Russia
On legal support of development of organizations of the military–industrial complex of Russia	Vladimir Gutenev	United Russia
On consideration of Federal budget expenditures aimed at ensuring national defense, national security and law enforcement	Andrey Makarov	United Russia
On investigate the interference of foreign states in the internal affairs of Russia	Vasily Piskarev (since 19 August 2019)	United Russia
On issues of parliamentary ethics	Otari Arshba (until 19 September 2018)	United Russia
On control over reliability of data on incomes, about property and obligations of property character, represented by deputies of the State Duma	Natalia Poklonskaya (until 19 September 2018)	United Russia

== Major legislation ==
=== First session ===
- October 7, 2016: Ratification of the agreement with Syria regarding the location of the grouping of the Russian Aerospace Forces, with 446 votes in favor.
- October 19, 2016: Ratification of a bill on the suspension agreement with the United States on plutonium disposition, with 445 votes in favor.
- November 18, 2016: Federal Budget for 2017 is passed with 334 votes in favor.

=== Second session ===
- January 20, 2017: Ratification of the agreement with Turkey on Turkish Stream, with 416 votes in favor.
- January 27, 2017: Adoption of the law on decriminalization of family beatings, with 380 votes in favor.
- June 9, 2017: Elvira Nabiullina re-approved as Governor of the Central Bank of Russia, with 360 votes in favor.
- July 19, 2017: Adoption of the law on revoking Russian citizenship (not granted through birth) for terrorism, with 409 votes in favor.

=== Third session ===
- November 15, 2017: Adoption of amendments to the law "About Information", regarding the status of foreign media as foreign agents, with 414 votes in favor.
- November 24, 2017: Federal Budget for 2018 is passed with 341 votes in favor.

=== Fourth session ===
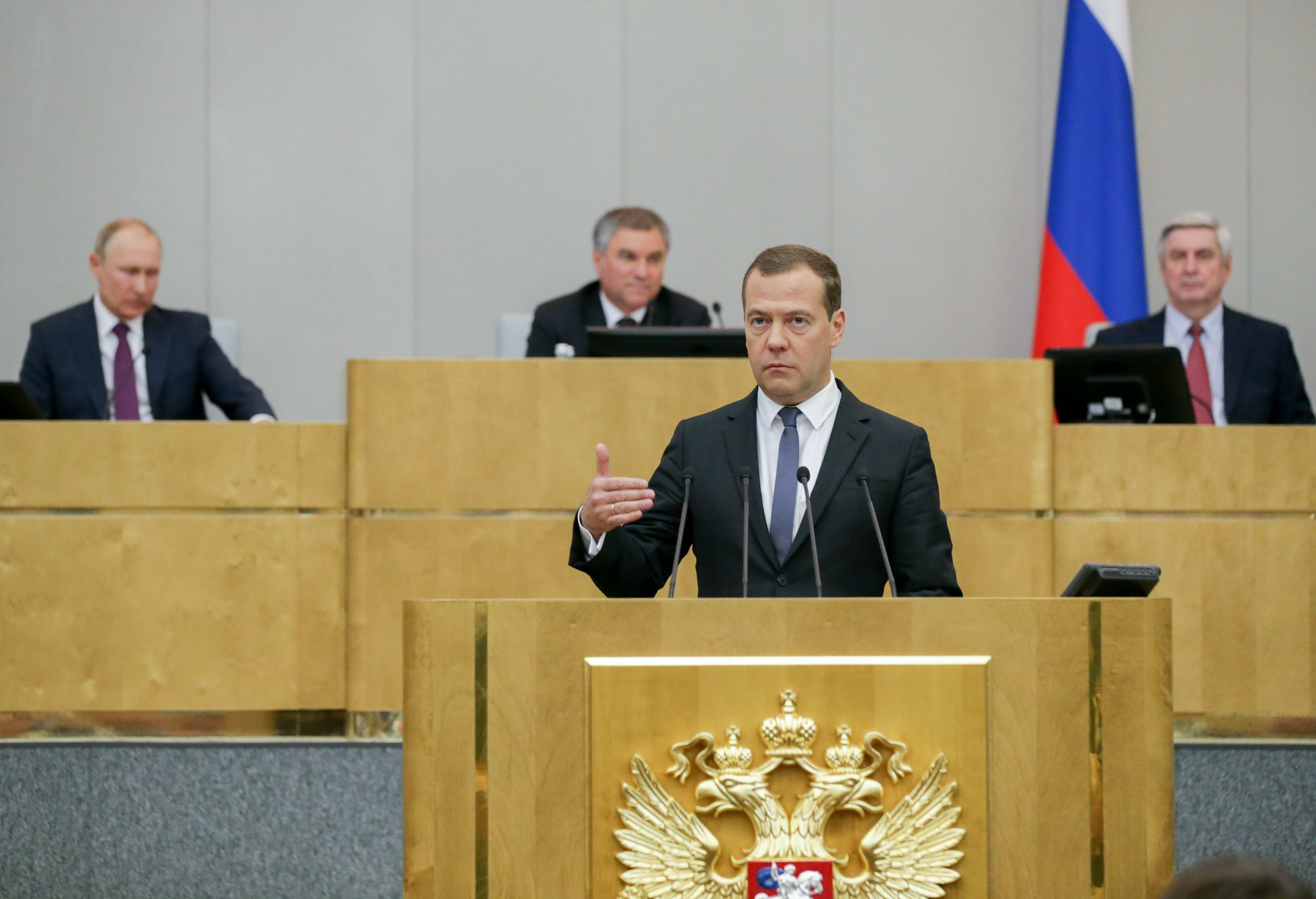
Medvedev at his confirmation hearing on May 8, 2018

- May 8, 2018: Dmitry Medvedev re-approved as Prime Minister of Russia with 374 votes in favor.
- May 22, 2018: Adoption of the law on counter-sanctions with 416 votes in favor.
- May 22, 2018: Alexei Kudrin approved as Chairman of the Accounts Chamber with 264 votes in favor.
- July 24, 2018: Adoption of the law on increasing Value-added tax from 18% to 20% with 302 votes in favor.
- July 25, 2018: Adoption of amendments to the law "About Education in the Russian Federation", regulating the study of the native languages of the peoples of Russia and the official languages of the federal subjects, with 388 votes in favor.

=== Fifth session ===
- September 27, 2018: Adoption of the law on increase the retirement age (from 55/60 to 60/65) with 332 votes in favor.
- November 21, 2018: Federal Budget for 2019 is passed with 361 votes in favor.

=== Sixth session ===
- March 7, 2019: Adoption of the law on fight against fake news with 322 votes in favor.
- March 7, 2019: Adoption of the law on punishment for distribution in information networks of the information expressing in an indecent form obvious disrespect to society, the state, official state symbols of Russia, the Constitution of Russia and public authorities of Russia with 327 votes in favor.
- April 16, 2019: Adoption of the law on "A Sovereign Internet" with 307 votes in favor.
- June 18, 2019: Adoption of the law on the suspension of the Intermediate-Range Nuclear Forces Treaty with 417 votes in favor.

=== Seventh session ===
- November 21, 2019: Federal Budget for 2020 is passed with 337 votes in favor.

=== Eighth session ===
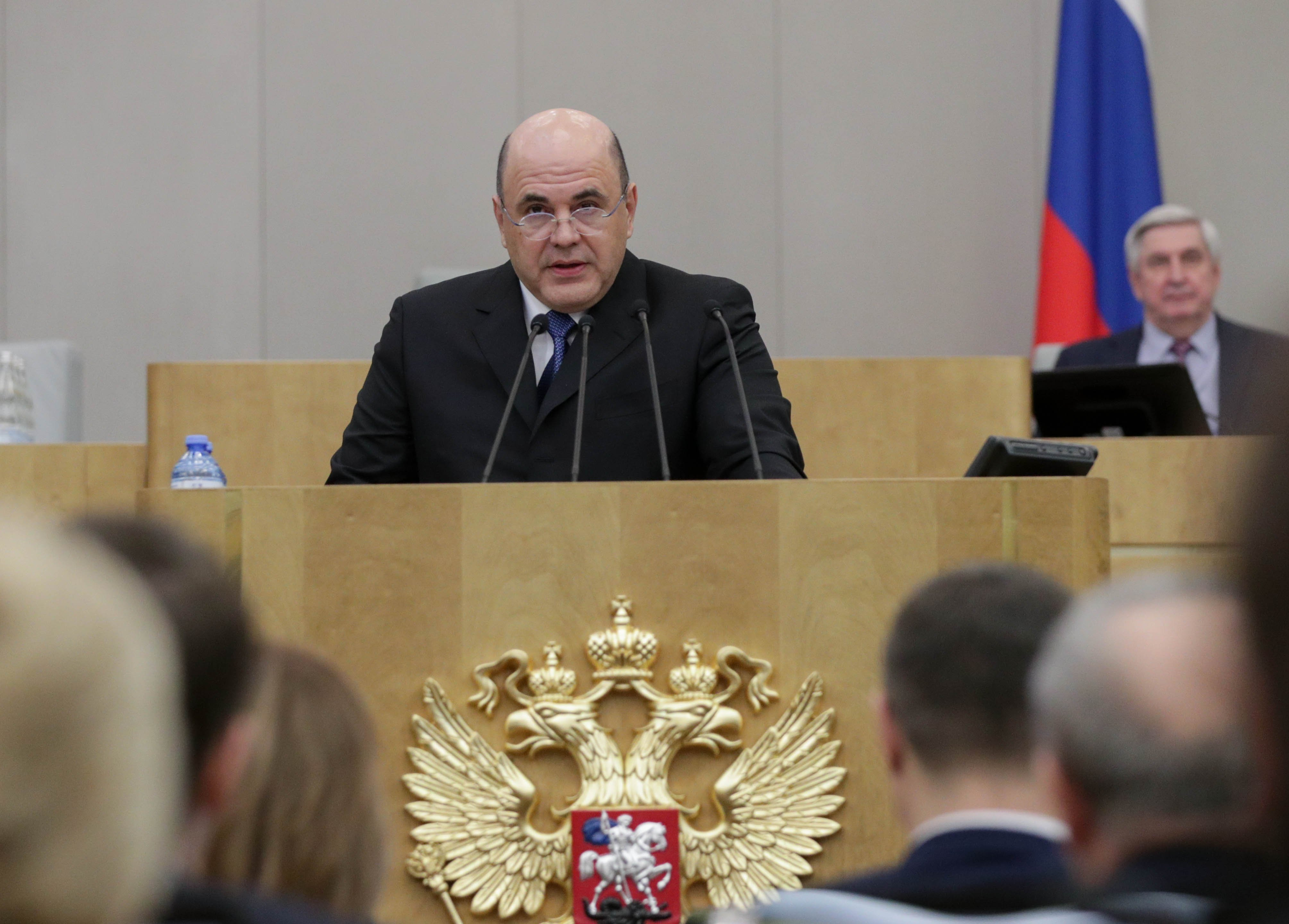
Mishustin at his confirmation hearing on January 16, 2020

- January 16, 2020: Mikhail Mishustin approved as Prime Minister of Russia with 383 votes in favor.
- March 11, 2020: Approved amendments to the Constitution of Russia with 383 votes in favor.
- July 21, 2020: Adoption of the law on three-day voting in elections with 344 votes in favor.

=== Ninth session ===
- October 27, 2020: Approved amendments to the Federal Constitutional Law "On the Constitutional Court of Russia" with 357 votes in favor.
- October 27, 2020: Adoption of the Federal Constitutional Law "On the Government of Russia" with 352 votes in favor.
- November 10, 2020: Vitaly Savelyev approved as Minister of Transport with 274 votes in favor.
- November 10, 2020: Alexander Kozlov approved as Minister of Natural Resources and Ecology with 274 votes in favor.
- November 10, 2020: Aleksey Chekunkov approved as Minister for Development of the Russian Far East and Arctic with 324 votes in favor.
- November 10, 2020: Irek Faizullin approved as Minister for Construction and Housing with 328 votes in favor.
- November 10, 2020: Nikolay Shulginov approved as Minister of Energy with 329 votes in favor.
- November 10, 2020: Alexander Novak approved as Deputy Prime Minister with 327 votes in favor.
- November 25, 2020: Adoption of the Federal Law "On the State Council of Russia" with 344 votes in favor.
- November 26, 2020: Federal Budget for 2021 is passed with 328 votes in favor.

== Members ==
=== Vacant seats ===
By-elections were held for seats that became vacant from September 2016 to June 2020. Seats that became vacant after 19 June 2020, for which no by-elections will be held, since by law by-elections are not held if MPs are elected for a term of less than a year before the next election.

Constituency		Region	Former Deputy	Former Party	Note
55	Central	Krasnoyarsk Krai	Pyotr Pimashkov	United Russia	
96	Bratsk	Irkutsk Oblast	Andrey Chernyshev	United Russia	
137	Iskitim	Novosibirsk Oblast	Alexander Karelin	United Russia	
143	Buguruslan	Orenburg Oblast	Igor Sukharev	United Russia	
151	Taganrog	Rostov Oblast	Yury Kobzev	United Russia	
165	Balashov	Saratov Oblast	Yevgeny Primakov Jr.	United Russia	
225	Yamalo-Nenets	Yamalo-Nenets Autonomous Okrug	Grigory Ledkov	United Russia	
