= Kazbek Taysaev =

Russian politician

Kazbek Taysaev MP
- Казбек Тайсаев
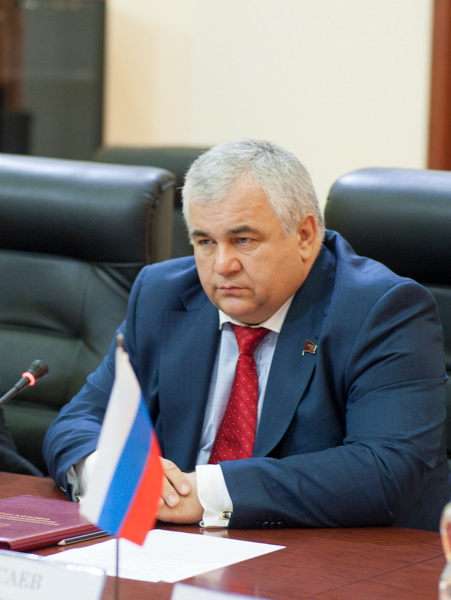
- Taysaev in 2014

Member of the State Duma (Party List Seat)
- Incumbent
- Assumed office 21 December 2011

Personal details
- Born: 12 February 1967 (age 59) Chikola, North Ossetian ASSR, Russian SFSR, Soviet Union
- Party: CPRF; CPSU (until 1991)
- Education: Moscow Automobile and Road Institute

Kazbek Kutsukovich Taysaev (Russian: Казбек Куцукович Тайсаев; born 12 February 1967) is a Russian political figure and a deputy of the 6th, 7th, and 8th State Dumas.

From 1985 to 1987, Taysaev served in the Soviet Armed Forces. From 1986 to 1991, he was a member of the Communist Party of the Soviet Union. After the dissolution of the Soviet Union, Taysaev was one of the initiators of the revival of the Komsomol movement in the Post-Soviet space. From 2002 to 2007, Taysaev worked at the Government of the Moscow Oblast as an assistant to Vladimir Kashin. From 2007 to 2011, he was the deputy of the Parliament of the Republic of North Ossetia–Alania. In 2008-2011, he was the advisor to Stanislav Kochiev. In 2008, he was also appointed secretary of the Central Committee of the Communist Party of the Russian Federation. From 2011 to 2016, he was the deputy of the 6th State Duma. In 2016 and 2021, he was re-elected for the 7th and 8th State Dumas.

== Legislative Activities ==
From 2011 to 2019, during his tenure as a deputy of the State Duma of the 6th and 7th convocations, he co-authored 61 legislative initiatives and amendments to draft federal laws.

On February 15, 2022, during the State Duma’s discussion of the resolution on recognizing the DPR and LPR, he stated: “The people of Russia fully support our resolution and are ready to give up not only their 13th salary.”

== Sanctions ==
He was sanctioned by the UK government in 2022 in relation to the Russo-Ukrainian War.
