= Irina Kuksenkova =

Russian politician and journalist (born 1984)

- Ирина Куксенкова

Member of the State Duma
- Incumbent
- Assumed office 30 September 2026
- Preceded by: Constituency created
- Constituency: Makiivka (No. 13) (Note: Her constituency, Makiivka, has been controlled by the Russian-backed, separatist Donetsk People's Republic (DPR) since 2014. During the 2022 Russian invasion of Ukraine, Russia declared the annexation of the DPR. The UN General Assembly rejected the annexation under Resolution ES-11/4, and the vast majority of international countries do not recognise it either. The city is still internationally considered part of Ukraine but under Russian occupation.)

Personal details
- Born: Irina Yulievna Kuksenkova; 24 September 1984 (age 42) Kiev, Ukrainian SSR, Soviet Union (now Kyiv, Ukraine)
- Party: United Russia
- Education: Moscow State University (2009, 2013); Imam Khomeini International University (2013)
- Occupation: Journalist

Irina Yulievna Kuksenkova (Russian: Ирина Юльевна Куксенкова; born 24 September 1984) is a Russian politician and journalist who has served as a member of the State Duma of the 9th convocation for the United Russia party since 2026. Prior to this, she served as a journalist for a number of Russian media outlets, including Channel One and Russia-24. She has also been a war correspondent throughout the Middle East, Georgia, and Ukraine.

== Early life ==
Kuksenkova was born on 24 September 1984 in the Ukrainian SSR capital of Kiev (or Kyiv), which was then part of the Soviet Union. Her father, Yuliy Kuksenkov, was formally the head coach of the Ukrainian artistic gymnastics national team. In 2013, he switched his nationality to Russian to become the head coach of the Russian national team instead. She has one younger brother, Nikolai Kuksenkov, who was also a professional gymnast, having won a silver medal in the team event at the 2016 Summer Olympics. Like her father, Nikolai originally competed for Ukraine before switching to Russia after receiving Russian citizenship in 2013. She herself was an artistic gymnast, and reached the title of master of sports.

== Journalism career ==
=== 2008-2013: Early career ===
After graduating from secondary school, beginning in either 2004 or 2005, she moved to Russia and began working as a special correspondent for law enforcement agencies for the Moscow-based Moskovskij Komsomolets (MK). During her time at MK, she was deployed as a war correspondent in the Russo-Georgian War. She reported during the Battle of Tskhinvali, where she was accompanied by Russian and Ossetian soldiers, and reported that she saw an entire field of dead Russian corpses from the Vostok Battalion. In a subsequent op-ed for MK, she said that the local South Ossetians had displayed an indifferent attitude toward Russian soldiers despite the Russians "fighting for their independence", and that the South Ossetian leaders were starting to push back and replace Russian-staffed figures. However, she ultimately wrote that Russia had achieved its "core geopolitical objectives" by securing a military foothold in the Caucasus and preventing what she called NATO expansion. She left MK in late 2008 to work at Russia-24, and a year later also graduated from the Faculty of Journalism at the Moscow State University. After five years at Russia-24, she left and graduated from the Institute of Asian and African Countries of Moscow State University with a specialisation in the history of Iran later that year. She also received a postgraduate diploma in Iranian studies from the Imam Khomeini International University in Iran that same year.

=== 2013-2022: Ingushetia and Middle East ===
Kuksenkova (middle) in 2022 during an award ceremony at the Kremlin.

In 2013, Kuksenkova was reassigned to become head of the press service and press secretary to the longtime Head of the Republic of Ingushetia, Yunus-bek Yevkurov during a cabinet reshuffle. Simultaneously, she worked as a news reporter on the TV channel "Ingushetia". She was dismissed from the post of press secretary in 2014. Afterwards, she returned to Russia-24 to work as a special correspondent, a position she held for three years until 2017. During her time there she was sent to cover the War in the Donbas and the Syrian Civil War. In July 2017, she became a special correspondent for Channel One. She also occasionally published for the newspaper, Free Press (Свободная пресса), in 2020 about issues in Iran.

=== 2022-2026: Ukraine and the All-Russia People's Front ===
Kuksenkova (left) meeting Vladimir Putin, together with other war correspondents, in 2023.

After the start of the 2022 Russian invasion of Ukraine, it was reported that Kuksenkova had become a correspondent at the frontlines, and that she helped record the Battle of Antonov Airport when Russian forces captured it. In April 2022, Channel One reported that she was wounded during the Siege of Mariupol near Illich Steel and Iron Works after several pieces of debris hit her in the leg. She said that the film crew were fired upon by "Ukrainian nationalists" with a grenade launcher, and that she was taken to a hospital in Donetsk.

After being wounded, she left the front to become a member of the central headquarters of the All-Russia People's Front (ONF), a coalition between United Russia and NGOs. She specifically was assigned by the ONF to head their project "Support Service for Veterans of the Special Military Operation". As part of the project, she has hosted "training camps" called "People's Front. Everything for Victory", which raise funds to help soldiers on the front lines. She also led the rehabilitation camp "Reboot" for participants of the so-called "SVO" who were injured at the front. In 2024, an additional 27.6 million rubles was given from the Presidential Grants Fund of the state to be used for more rehabilitation camps for participants in the SVO.

== Political career ==
In 2026, Kuksenkova announced her intentions to run for a seat in the State Duma during the 9th convocation with United Russia. It was reported by The Moscow Times that Putin was deliberately trying to get participants from the SVO and other propagandists who had worked in covering it into the Duma. As this was the first state Duma elections where constituencies were introduced for the newly annexed Donetsk People's Republic (DPR), although the annexation was not recognised by the majority of the international community, Kuksenkova ran within the new constituency No. 13. The 13th district consisted of the cities of Makiivka, Khartsyzk, Ilovaisk, Amvrosiivka, Starobeshevo, and parts of the city of Donetsk. She easily won in a landslide with 69.53% of the vote, according to Russian authorities.

== Personal life ==
She was married to journalist Viktor Sokirko, who worked at the Russian newspaper Free Press (Свободная пресса). They had one daughter, Eva, in 2005, before subsequently divorcing. Her daughter is also engaged in artistic gymnastics.

On 6 February 2026, prominent Russian general Vladimir Alekseyev was shot multiple times at her apartment building near the Volokolamsk Highway in Moscow during a reported assassination attempt. A few days later, a Ukrainian journalist, Denys Kazanski, alleged that the reason Vladimir Alekseyev was at her place at the time of his shooting was because she was his mistress, although the accusations remained unconfirmed.

== Honours and awards ==
Kuksenkova has been awarded the following honours and awards:

- Medal "For Courage" (2009)
- Laureate of the Prize of the Government of the Russian Federation in the field of print media (2009)
- Medal of the Order "For Merit to the Fatherland" (2015)
- Order of Courage (2022)

== International sanctions ==
On 12 October 2026, Kuksenkova was included on the international sanctions list of the European Union for her association with the United Russia party and for participating in the 2026 elections in the DPR. She has also been included on the French sanctions register as part of her sanctions under the EU, and the national asset freezing list of Monaco in compliance with the EU since 2026. In Ukraine, she is also included in the list of "Kremlin mouthpieces" for actively supporting the war against Ukraine, and the sanction list of the country since 2026. She is also included in the Ukrainian database Myrotvorets.
