= Central Committee of the Communist Party of the Russian Federation =

Central Committee of the Communist Party of the Russian Federation Центральный комитет Коммунистической партии Российской Федерации

Information
- First Secretary: Gennady Zyuganov
- Responsible to: Party Congress
- Preceded by: Central Committee of the CP RSFSR

Meeting place
- 16th building, Ol'khovskaya Ulitsa Moscow, Moscow Oblast, Russia 105066

The Central Committee of the Communist Party of the Russian Federation is the highest body of the Communist Party of the Russian Federation. The members of the Central Committee are elected through secret ballot by the Congress of the party for a 4-year term. The Central Committee determines the activities of the party. Gennady Zyuganov has been the chairman of the Central Committee since 1993.

== Powers ==
The Central Committee is the standing administrative body of the Communist Party of the Russian Federation. The Committee addresses any issues outside the exclusive jurisdiction of the Party Congress and not settled by rulings of the Congress.

Plenaries of the Central Committee are held by the Presidium at least once every 4 months.

== Presidium and Secretariat ==
Presidium and Secretariat are both central bodies inside the Central Committee.

Presidium implements the rulings of the Congress and is the main executive authority of the party between the Central Committee Plenaries. Presidium is elected from the members of the Central Committee. Chairman of the Central Committee is the head of the Presidium and this position is held by Gennady Zyuganov since 1993.

The secretariat is accountable for day-to-day operations of the party and is mainly a technical body to the Presidium. Members of the Secretariat are also elected by the Central Committee.

== Current composition ==
Current composition of the Central Committee was formed in April 2021 at the XVIII Congress of CPRF. A total of 188 members were elected to the Central Committee and 141 gained the status of candidates for membership. The most notable changes were made to the Presidium as Yury Afonin became First Deputy Chairman of the Central Committee and several notable politicians left the Presidium, including first secretary of Moscow city committee Valery Rashkin, former Governor of Irkutsk Oblast Sergey Levchenko, former first secretary of Saint Petersburg city committee Olga Khodunova and former State Duma member Sergey Reshulsky.

=== Presidium ===
- Gennady Zyuganov, Member of State Duma (since 1993), Leader of CPRF caucus in State Duma, Chairman of the Central Committee
- Ivan Melnikov, Member of State Duma (since 1995), First Vice Speaker of State Duma, First Deputy Chairman of the Central Committee
- Sergey Obukhov, Member of State Duma (since 2007), First Deputy Chairman of the Central Committee
- Vladimir Kashin, Member of State Duma (since 2003), Chairman of the Duma Committee an Agriculture
- Nikolay Vasilyev, Member of State Duma (2011-2016, since 2021), first secretary of Moscow Oblast committee
- Leonid Kalashnikov, Member of State Duma (since 2011), Chairman of the Duma Committee on CIS, Eurasian Integration and Compatriots Relations
- Nikolay Kolomeytsev, Member of State Duma (1995-2003, since 2007), first secretary of Rostov Oblast committee
- Dmitry Novikov, Member of State Duma (since 2011)
- Sergey Obukhov, Member of State Duma (2007-2016, since 2021)
- Nikolay Kharitonov, Member of State Duma (since 1993), Chairman of the Duma Committee on Far East and Arctic Development
- Boris Komotsky, Member of State Duma (2011-2016, since 2021)
- Andrey Klychkov, Governor of Oryol Oblast (since 2017)
- Nikolay Arefyev, Member of State Duma (1995-2003, since 2011)
- Georgy Kamnev, Member of State Duma (since 2021), first secretary of Penza Oblast committee
- Anatoly Lokot, Mayor of Novosibirsk (since 2014), first secretary of Novosibirsk Oblast committee
- Kazbek Taysaev, Member of State Duma (since 2011)
- Maria Drobot, Member of State Duma (since 2021)
- Aleksandr Ivachyov, Member of Legislative Assembly of Sverdlovsk Oblast, first secretary of Sverdlovsk Oblast committee
- Roman Kononeko, Member of Legislative Assembly of Saint Petersburg, first secretary of Saint Petersburg committee

=== Secretariat ===
- Nikolay Kolomeytsev, Member of State Duma (1995-2003, since 2007), first secretary of Rostov Oblast committee
- Andrey Klychkov, Governor of Oryol Oblast (since 2017)
- Georgy Kamnev, Member of State Duma (since 2021), first secretary of Penza Oblast committee
- Nikolay Arefyev, Member of State Duma (1995-2003, since 2011)
- Sergey Obukhov, Member of State Duma (2007-2016, since 2021)
- Kazbek Taysaev, Member of State Duma (since 2011)
- Maria Drobot, Member of State Duma (since 2021)
- Aleksey Kornienko, Member of State Duma (since 2007)
- Stanislav Anikhovsky, main referent of the CPRF caucus in State Duma
- Vladimir Isakov, Member of State Duma (since 2021), first secretary of Leninist Komsomol of the Russian Federation
- Aleksandr Yushchenko, Member of State Duma (since 2011)
