= Dmitry Novikov =

Russian politician

Dmitry Novikov MP
- Дмитрий Новиков
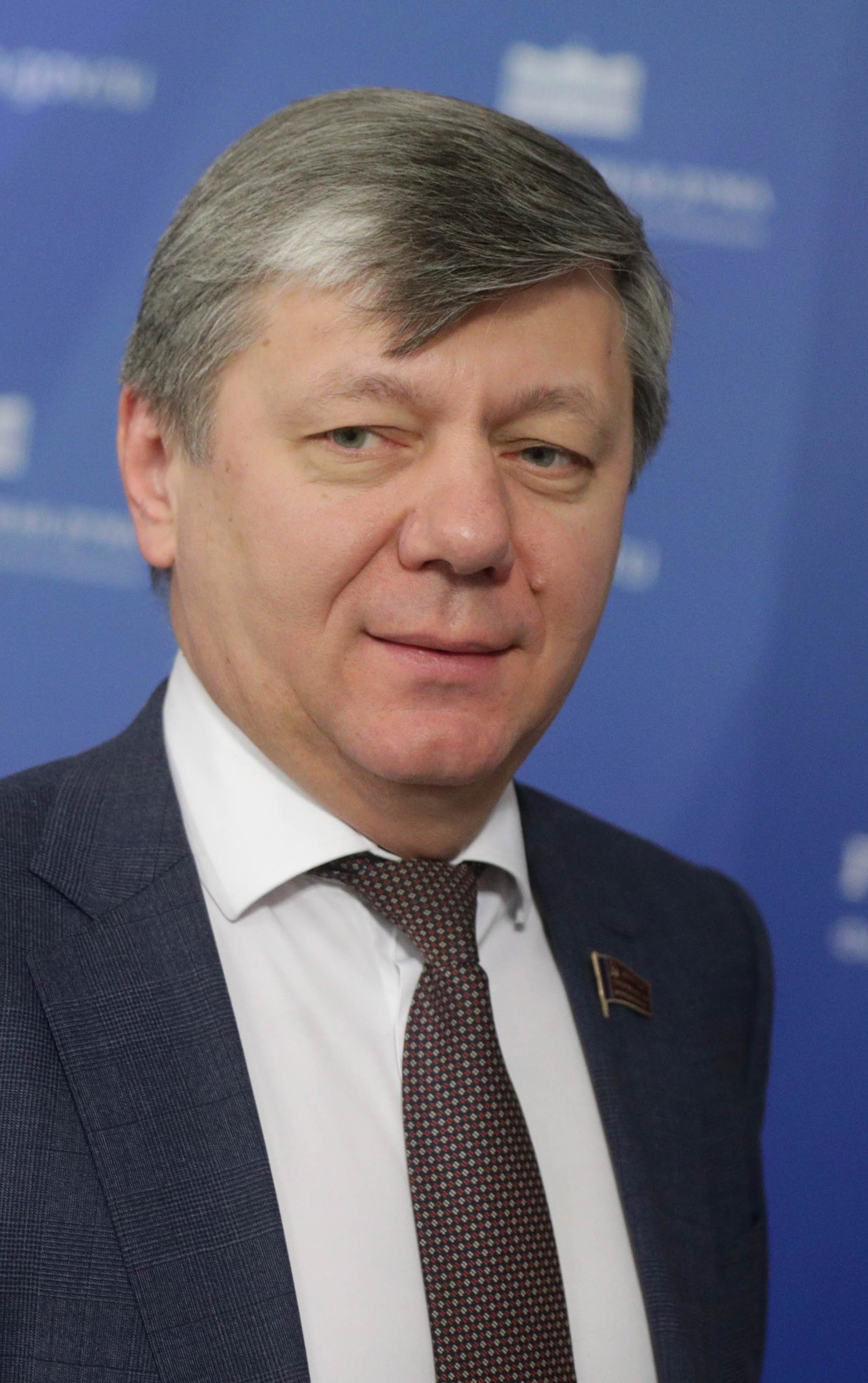
- Novikov in 2020

Member of the State Duma (Party List Seat)
- Incumbent
- Assumed office 21 December 2011

Deputy Chairman of the CPRF Central Committee
- Incumbent
- Assumed office 24 February 2013 Serving with Vladimir Kashin and Leonid Kalashnikov

Member of the CPRF Central Committee
- Incumbent
- Assumed office 30 November 2008

Personal details
- Born: 12 September 1969 (age 56) Khabarovsk, Russian SFSR, Soviet Union (now Russia)
- Party: Communist Party of the Russian Federation
- Education: BSPU (1992)
- Website: kprf.ru/personal/novikov

Military service
- Allegiance: Soviet Union
- Branch/service: Soviet Army: Soviet Air Defence Forces
- Years of service: 1988–1989

Dmitry Georgievich Novikov (Russian: Дмитрий Георгиевич Новиков, born 12 September 1969) is a deputy for the Communist Party in the 7th State Duma of the Russian Federation. He is first deputy chairman of the State Duma Committee on International Affairs. He was elected effective September 18, 2016.

== Early years and education ==
Dmitry Novikov was born on September 12, 1969 in Khabarovsk.

In 1992 he graduated from the M. I. Kalinin Blagoveshchensk State Pedagogical Institute, Faculty of History, Social Studies and Law. He is a Candidate of Historical Sciences. In 2001 he defended his thesis. In 1986 he entered the Faculty of History at the same Institute. After the second year, he joined the army, and returned to study in 1989.

== Career ==
In June 1992 he joined the Communist Party of the RSFSR (liquidated in November 1995), and since 1993 he has been a member of the Communist Party of the Russian Federation.

In 1992-2001 he was the head of the Amur Communist Youth Union. In 1995-1997 he worked as an assistant to a member of the Federation Council of the Russian Federation. In 1997-2001 he worked as Deputy Chairman of the Committee and Head of the Youth Affairs Department of the Amur Oblast Administration.

On October 7, 2001 he participated in the by-election of a deputy of the State Duma of the Russian Federation of the third convocation, but did not pass.

Since 2004 he has been a member of the Central Committee of the Communist Party of the Russian Federation. Secretary of the Central Committee of the Party. Second Secretary of the Amur Regional Committee of the Communist Party of the Russian Federation.

On December 2, 2007 he was elected to the 5th State Duma of the Russian Federation on the federal list of the Communist Party of the Russian Federation.

In 2011-2016 he was a Deputy of the State Duma of the Russian Federation of the VI convocation. On December 4, 2011 he was elected as part of the federal list of the Communist Party of the Russian Federation.

Since February 24, 2013 he has been the Deputy Chairman of the Central Committee of the Communist Party of the Russian Federation Gennady Zyuganov.

In 2016-2021 he was a Deputy of the State Duma of the Russian Federation of the VII convocation. He was elected on September 18, 2016 on the list of the Communist Party of the Russian Federation.

On September 19, 2021 he was elected a Deputy of the 8th State Duma from the Communist Party of the Russian Federation.

Since October 12, 2021 he is the First Deputy Chairman of the State Duma Committee on International Affairs Leonid Slutsky.

== Wealth ==
In 2016-2017, Dmitry Novikov's income amounted to 4,687,476 rubles. Real estate: 3 apartments.

== Awards ==
On April 12, 2018 he received the anniversary medal "IPA CIS. 25 years" for his services to the development and strengthening of parliamentarism, for his contribution to the development and improvement of the legal foundations of the functioning of the Commonwealth of Independent States, strengthening international relations and interparliamentary cooperation.

In 2021 he was awarded a certificate of honour for his contribution to the development of model legislation and interparliamentary cooperation among the CSTO member states.

== Sanctions ==
Novikov was sanctioned by the United States Department of the Treasury and the Government of the United Kingdom following the 2022 Russian invasion of Ukraine.

He is under the sanctions of the United States of America since March 11, 2022, under Canadian sanctions since February 24, 2022, under Swiss sanctions since February 25, 2022, under Australian sanctions since February 26, 2022, under Japanese sanctions since March 15, 2022, under Ukrainian sanctions since September 7, 2022, by the decree of the President of Ukraine, Vladimir Zelensky. He has been in New Zealand sanctions list since May 3, 2022.
