= Timur Kanokov =

Russian politician

Timur Kanokov MP
- Тимур Каноков
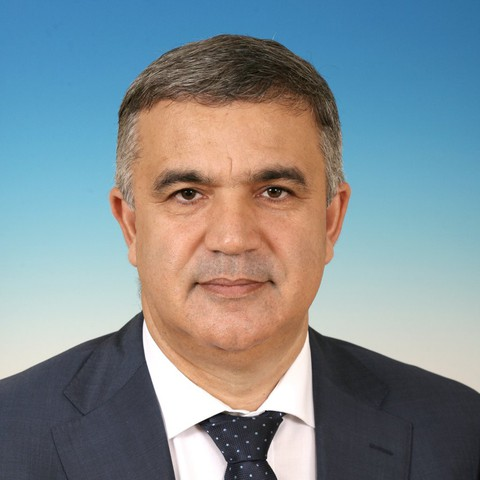
- official portrait, circa 2021

Member of the State Duma (Party List Seat)
- Incumbent
- Assumed office 12 October 2021

Personal details
- Born: 24 September 1972 (age 54) Shithala, Kabardino-Balkarian ASSR, RSFSR, USSR
- Party: New People (2026–present)
- Other political affiliations: A Just Russia (?–2026)
- Education: Lenin Higher Naval Engineering School; RANEPA (DPhil)

Timur Borisovich Kanokov (Russian: Тимур Борисович Каноков; born September 24, 1972, Shithala, Kabardino-Balkarian Autonomous Soviet Socialist Republic) is a Russian political figure and a deputy of the 9th State Dumas.

== Biography ==
Timur Kanokov was born on September 24, 1972, in the village of Shitkhala. In 1995, he graduated from the Lenin Higher Naval Engineering School. In 2007, he defended his Candidate of Sciences (PhD equivalent) dissertation on the topic: "Parameters and Operating Modes of a Combined Soil-Cultivating Unit." In 2018, he graduated from the Russian Presidential Academy of National Economy and Public Administration with a degree in State and Municipal Administration.

He held the position of Deputy Director of Syndika-O Holding Company JSC. From 2015 to 2017, he served as an advisor to the governor of Smolensk Oblast. Before being elected to the State Duma, he worked as Vice President for Capital Construction and Internal Development at the Association of Wholesale and Retail Markets.

In 2016, he ran for the State Duma for the first time, representing the political party A Just Russia. He was listed second in the federal district of regional group No. 26 (which included Vologda, Novgorod, and Tver regions), and also ran in the Zavolzhsky single-member constituency No. 180 in Tver Oblast. As a result of the vote and the subsequent distribution of mandates among candidates from the federal list, he did not secure a seat in the 7th State Duma. In the single-member district, he placed fourth out of nine candidates, receiving 6.43% of the vote.

In 2021, he again participated in the State Duma elections, this time representing the party A Just Russia — Patriots — For Truth, running on the federal list for a regional group that included the Republic of North Ossetia–Alania, Stavropol Krai, Kabardino-Balkaria, and Karachay-Cherkessia, and was elected to the 8th State Duma. On October 12, 2021, he was appointed Deputy Chairman of the State Duma Committee on Small and Medium Business.

== Sanctions ==
He was sanctioned by the UK government in 2022 in relation to the Russo-Ukrainian War.
