= Nikolay Nikolaev (politician) =

Russian politician

- Николай Николаев
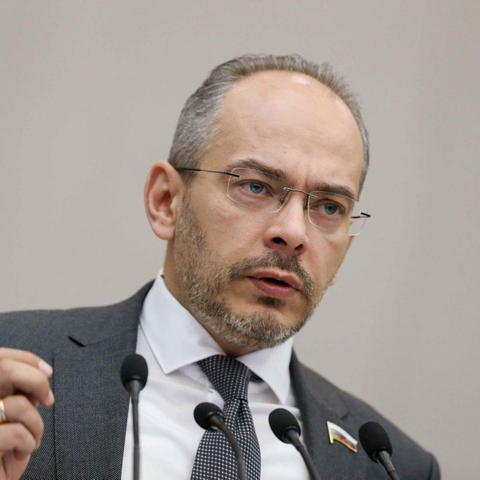

Deputy of the 8th State Duma
- Incumbent
- Assumed office 19 September 2021

Deputy of the 7th State Duma
- In office 5 October 2016 – 12 October 2021

Personal details
- Born: 2 April 1970 (age 56) Moscow, Soviet Union
- Party: United Russia
- Education: Tashkent Road Institute

Nikolay Nikolaev (Russian: Николай Петрович Николаев; born 2 April 1970, Moscow) is a Russian political figure and a deputy of the 7th and 8th State Dumas.

From 1994 to 1998, Nikolaev worked in Tashkent and Moscow as a correspondent at the East European Insurance Report (Financial Times). In 1991-2001, he was the head of the department of the insurance company "Progress-Garant". In 2003, he founded and headed the communication group "AMSCOM", which until 2009 provided services in public relations and authorities to companies in the financial sector. From 2010 to 2014, Nikolaev was CEO of the National Association of Insurance Representatives. In 2013-2014, he was the vice president of the All-Russian public organization of small and medium business "Support of Russia". In 2016, he was elected deputy of the 7th State Duma. In 2021, he was re-elected for the 8th State Duma.

== Sanctions ==
On 24 March 2022, the United States Treasury sanctioned him in response to the 2022 Russian invasion of Ukraine.

He was sanctioned by the UK government in 2022 in relation to the Russo-Ukrainian War.

== Awards ==
- Order "For Merit to the Fatherland"
