= Aleksandr Sidyakin =

Russian politician (born 1977)

- Александр Сидякин

Member of the State Duma
- Incumbent
- Assumed office 2024
- Preceded by: Igor Kastyukevich
- In office 21 December 2011 – 5 October 2016

Personal details
- Born: 17 November 1977 (age 48) Segezha
- Party: United Russia
- Education: Tver State University

Aleksandr Gennadyevich Sidyakin (Russian: Александр Геннадьевич Сидякин; born 17 November 1977) is a Russian politician who has been a member of the State Duma since 2025.

He is the deputy secretary general of United Russia. Following the 2026 parliamentary election he became a deputy to the 9th State Duma and chairman of the State Duma Committee for Digital Development and Artificial Intelligence.
