= Olga Timofeeva =

Russian politician and journalist (born 1977)

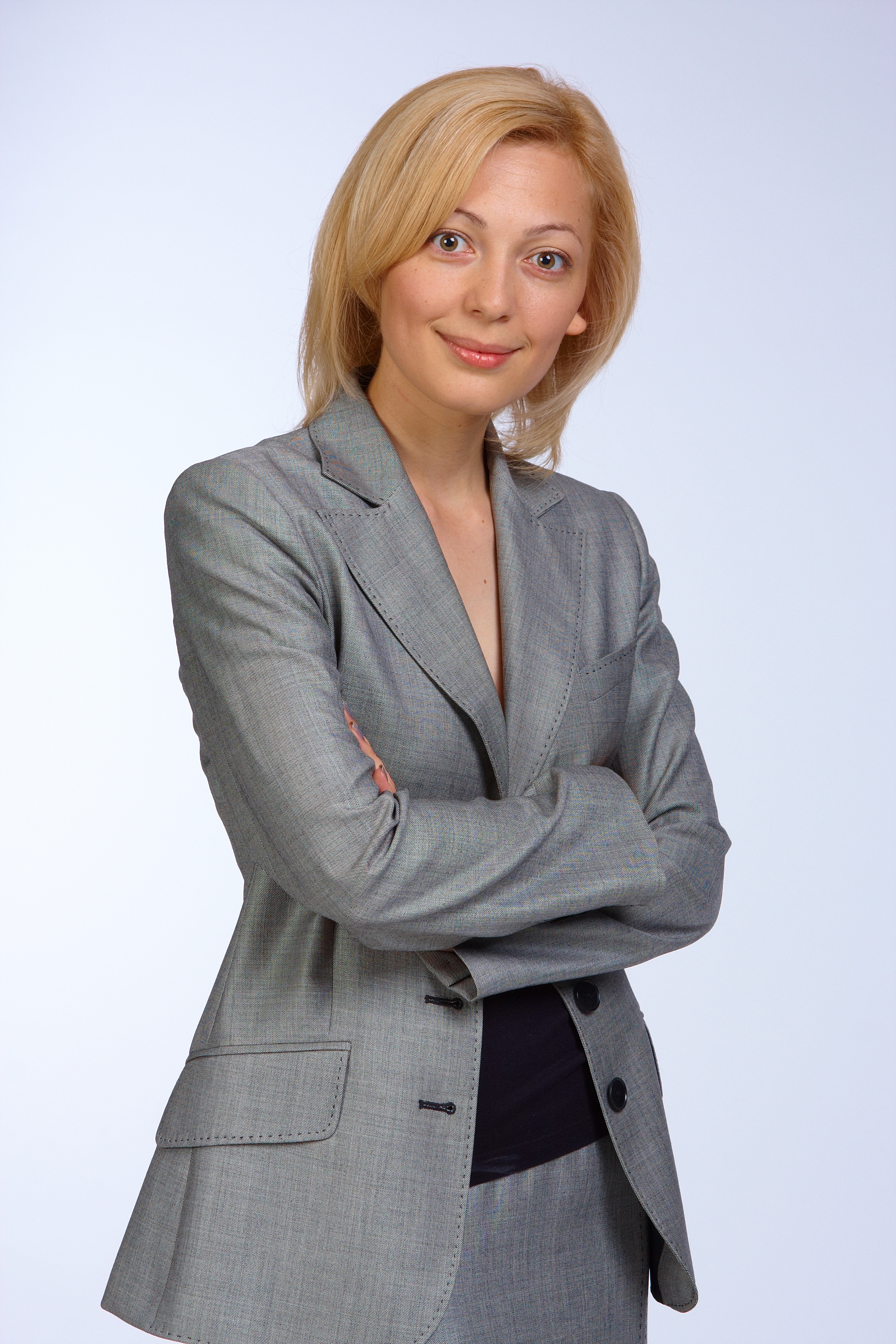

Acting deputy chairman of the Government of the Stavropol territory
- Incumbent
- Assumed office 1 October 2026
- Governor: Vladimir Vladimirov
- Preceded by: Andrey Khlopyanov

Deputy head of the United Russia faction in the State Duma Russia
- In office 26 February 2025 – 30 September 2026
- Preceded by: Vladimir Ivanov
- Succeeded by: Roman Lyubarsky

Deputy of the State Duma Russia
- In office 22 May 2012 – 20 September 2026
- Preceded by: Vladimir Zerenkov
- Succeeded by: Dmitry Shuvaev
- Constituency: Nevinnomyssk constituency

Chairman of the State Duma committee on civil society development
- In office 12 October 2021 – 26 February 2025
- Preceded by: Sergei Gavrilov
- Succeeded by: Yana Lantratova

Deputy Chairman of the State Duma Russia
- In office 9 October 2017 – 12 October 2021
- Chairman: Vyacheslav Volodin
- Preceded by: Vladimir Vasilyev
- Succeeded by: Anna Kuznetsova

Chairman of the State Duma committee on Ecology and Environmental Protection
- In office 5 October 2016 – 9 October 2017
- Preceded by: Vladimir Kashin
- Succeeded by: Vladimir Burmatov

Deputy of the Duma of the city of Stavropol
- In office 12 October 2008 – 22 May 2012
- Constituency: Stavropol

Personal details
- Born: 19 August 1977 (age 49) Stavropol, RSFSR, USSR
- Party: United Russia
- Education: Stavropol State University; Stavropol State Agricultural Academy; Moscow Aviation Institute
- Profession: journalist politician
- Website: timofeeva.me

Olga Victorovna Timofeeva (Russian: Ольга Викторовна Тимофеева; born 19 August 1977) is Russian journalist and politician. Acting deputy chairman of the Government of the Stavropol territory from 1 October 2026 year.

Deputy head of the United Russia faction in the State Duma Russia from 26 February 2025 to 30 September 2026. Deputy State Duma convocation VI and convocation VII and VIII, a member of the All-Russia People's Front.

Chairman of the Committee state Duma of the Federal Assembly of the Russian Federation on ecology and environmental protection from 5 October 2016 to 9 October 2017. Member city Duma Stavropol from 12 October 2008 to 22 May 2012.

== Biography ==
=== Education ===
- 1999 – faculty of law, Stavropol state University, specialty "lawyer";
- 2000 – faculty of Finance and credit of Stavropol State Agrarian University, specialty "Finance and credit";
- 2004 – faculty of professional retraining at the Moscow Aviation Institute (State technical University) under the Presidential program of managerial personnel, specialty "management".

=== The work of a journalist ===
Since 1996 works at Stavropol television: TV channel ATV, then "REN TV-Stavropol" (closed from 1 November 2015).

She has 18 years' experience in journalism, including as a TV journalist, editor, producer, and program hoest. She received additional professional education at the school of journalism "Internews".

She is the author and host of the program Time to Talk.

In 2007 Olga Timofeeva became the winner of the all-Russian television competition TEFI — region" in the nomination "Best interviewer". She is a member of the Union of journalists of Russia.

Since 2010, Timofeeva has been a member of the Russian Academy of Television.

=== Deputy of Stavropol city Duma ===
In 2008, she won the election of deputies of the Stavropol city Duma, headed the Committee on information policy, interaction with public and veteran organizations. In March 2011, for the second time confirmed the powers of the Deputy, winning the elections of the Stavropol city Duma of the 6th convocation.

=== The Deputy of the State Duma ===
Since 22 May 2012, Timofeeva is a Deputy state Duma of the Russian Federation of the 6th convocation, member of the Committee of the state Duma on information policy, information technologies and communication.

From 2013 to 2018 she was the co-Chairman of the Central Staff of the Russian Popular Front.

In 2013 she was awarded a medal "For services to the city of Stavropol".

In 2014 she was awarded the title of "Honorary citizen of the city of Stavropol".

In 2016 she was awarded the medal of the order of merit for the Fatherland of the II degree.

Together with Dmitry Kharatyan on 18 March 2015, she conducted a concert on Red Square – Sevastopol-Crimea-Russia.

In 2016, she took 1st place (68.23% of votes) in the regional part of the party list in the Russian United Russia preliminary voting.

On 18 September 2016 she was re-elected to the State Duma of Russia of the 7th convocation, and became Chairman of the State Duma Committee on ecology and the environment.

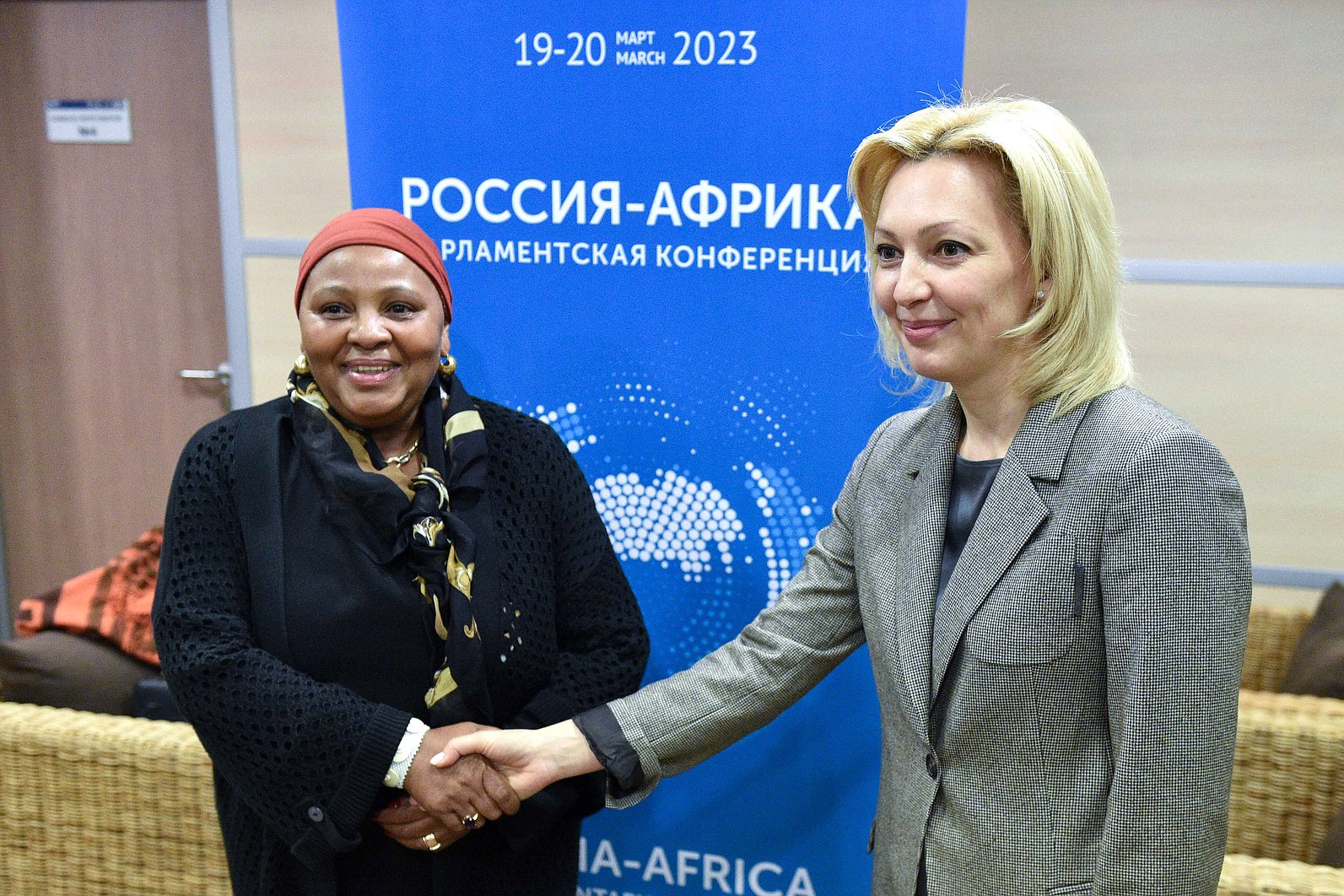
Timofeeva with South Africa's National Assembly speaker Nosiviwe Mapisa-Nqakula in Moscow on 18 March 2023

She was given a special award Ryan "For merits in development of science and economy of Russia" in 2017.

Since 9 October 2017 she is the Vice-speaker of the state Duma.

Timofeeva did not take part in the vote on pension reform. She has stated that at the time of voting she was on a business trip.

On 11 December 2018 she was awarded the Order of Merit.

On 20 December 2018 she was awarded "for active legislative work", certificate of Honor of the Government of the Russian Federation. The award was presented at the Prime Minister of the Russian Federation Dmitry Medvedev in the boardroom of the state Duma of the Russian Federation.

=== Sanctions ===
She was sanctioned by the UK government in 2022 in relation to Russo-Ukrainian War.

=== Legislation ===
From 2012 to 2019, during the execution of the powers of the state Duma Deputy of VI and VII convocations, she co-authored 40 legislative initiatives and amendments to the draft Federal laws.
