= Vladislav Golovin =

Russian politician (born 1997)

Chairman of the State Duma committee on youth policy
- Incumbent
- Assumed office 30 September 2026
- Preceded by: Artem Metelev

Deputy of the State Duma of Russia
- Incumbent
- Assumed office 20 September 2026
- Constituency: federal party list

Personal details
- Born: 20 May 1997 (age 29) Kirov, Kirov Oblast, Russia
- Party: United Russia
- Education: Ryazan higher airborne command school
- Profession: politician

Vladislav Nikolayevich Golovin (Russian: Владислав Николаевич Головин; born 20 May 1997) is a Russian politician. Chairman of the State Duma Russia committee on youth policy from 30 September 2026 year. Hero of the Russian Federation.

He has served as chief of the general staff of the Young Army Cadets National Movement since 2024.

== Biography ==
Vladislav Nikolaevich Golovin was born on May 20, 1997, in city Kirov, Kirov Oblast.

In 2015, he graduated from Lyceum of Information Technologies 28 in city Kirov.

In 2020, he became a graduate of the Ryazan Higher Airborne Command School named after Army General V.F.Margelov.

In 2023 year, he worked as a senior lecturer at the department of military‑political work.

In 2024, he was appointed to the position of deputy chairman of the board of the Russian movement of children and youth.

In December 2024, he was appointed head of the Main Headquarters of the Yunarmiya movement in Russia.

Since 2024, he has been a member of the «United Russia» party.

Since December 2024, he has been a member of the Supreme Council of the United Russia Party.

In June 2026, he became a candidate for deputy to the 9th State Duma under the federal party list.

Since September 20, 2026 year— deputy of the 9th convocation of the State Duma of Russia.

Since September 30, 2026 year— chairman of the State Duma of Russia’s committee on youth policy.

Candidate for the title of master of sports in multi‑event athletics.

== Awards ==
- Hero of the Russian Federation.
- Medal of Georgy Zhukov.
