= Vladimir Ivanov (politician, born 1971) =

Russian politician

Vladimir Valerevich Ivanov
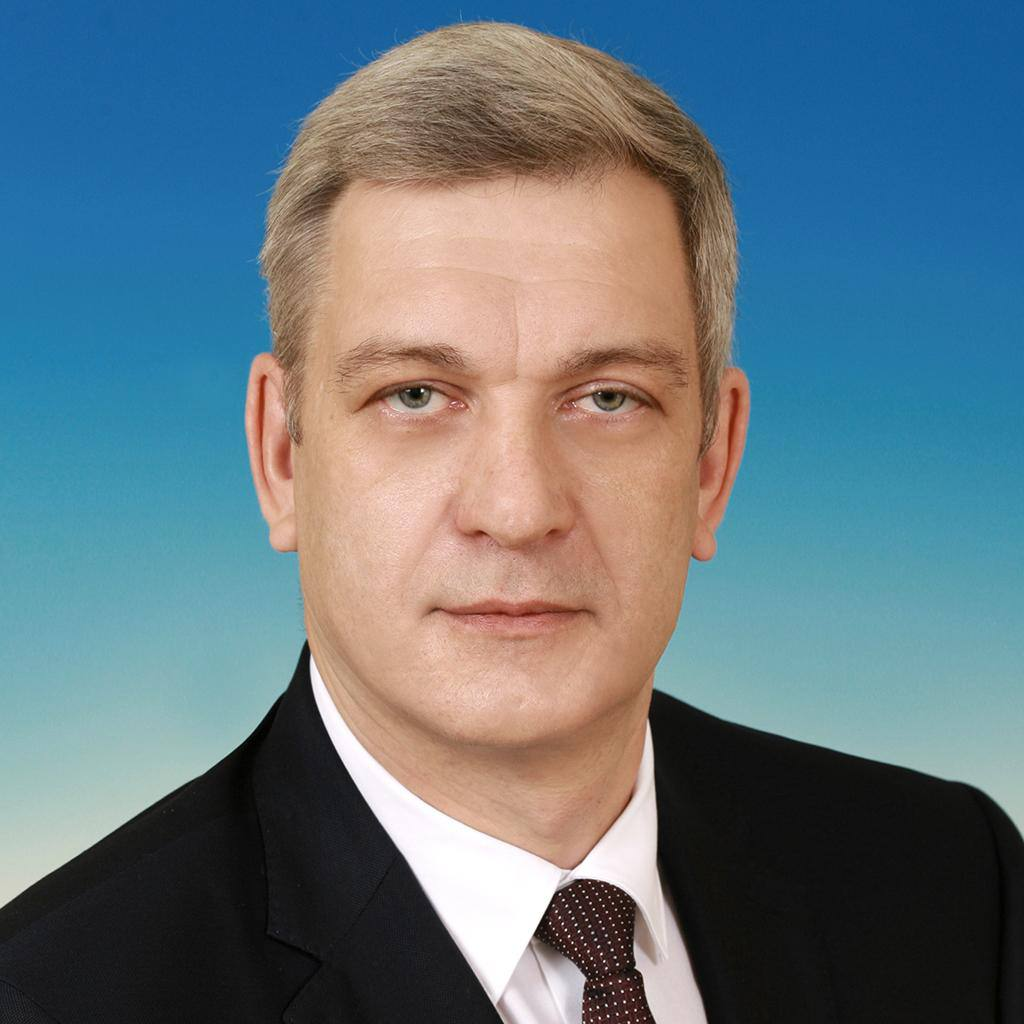

Chairman of the State Duma committee on Ethnic Affairs
- Incumbent
- Assumed office 26 February 2025
- Preceded by: Gennady Semigin

Deputy of the State Duma Russia
- Incumbent
- Assumed office 19 September 2021
- Constituency: Stavropol Kray

Deputy head of the United Russia faction in the State Duma Russia
- In office 7 October 2021 – 26 February 2025
- Faction leader: Vladimir Vasiliev
- Succeeded by: Olga Timofeeva

Head of the administration and government of the Republic of Dagestan
- In office 8 November 2017 – 10 November 2020
- Governor: Vladimir Vasiliev
- Succeeded by: Alexey Gasanov

Personal details
- Born: 10 February 1971 year Moscow, RSFSR, USSR
- Party: United Russia
- Education: RANEPA
- Profession: politician

Vladimir Valeryevich Ivanov (born 10 February 1971) is a Russian politician. Chairman of the State Duma Russia committee on Ethnic Affairs from 26 February 2025 year.

In 2017-2021, he was the head of the administration of the head and government of the Republic of Dagestan. He has been a member of the State Duma for United Russia since 2021. In September 2021, he was elected as a deputy of the 8th State Duma.
