= Sergei Gavrilov (politician) =

Russian politician (born 1966)

Sergei Gavrilov MP
- Сергей Гаврилов
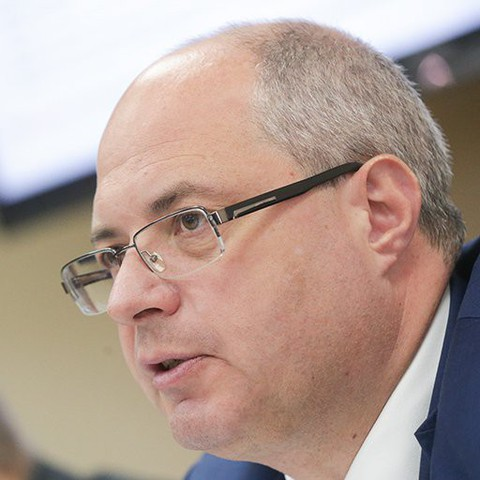

Chairman of the State Duma committee on Property, Land and Property Relations
- Incumbent
- Assumed office 12 October 2021

Deputy of the State Duma
- Incumbent
- Assumed office 18 September 2016
- Constituency: Belgorod Oblast; Voronezh Oblast

Chairman of the State Duma committee on civil society development
- In office 12 October 2021 – 26 February 2025
- Preceded by: Yaroslav Nilov
- Succeeded by: Olga Timofeeva

Chairman of the State Duma committee on Property Issues
- In office 21 December 2011 – 5 October 2016

Personal details
- Born: 27 January 1966 (age 60) Tula, Russian SFSR, Soviet Union
- Party: Communist Party of the Russian Federation
- Education: Moscow State University; Russian Academy of Public Administration
- Awards: Order For Merit to the Fatherland
- Religion: Russian Orthodox

Sergei Anatolievich Gavrilov (Russian: Серге́й Анато́льевич Гаври́лов; born 27 January 1966) is a Russian politician. He is a deputy of the State Duma, representing the Communist Party of the Russian Federation.

He was born in Tula, during the time period of the Soviet Union; and would go on to receive a Candidate of Science in Economics, considered a PhD equivalent, from Moscow State University in 1989.

== Awards ==
- Order of Blessed Prince Daniel of Moscow, 3rd class (2021)
- Certificate of Honor of the President of the Russian Federation (22 October 2019) — for contributions to strengthening Russian statehood, the development of parliamentarism, and many years of diligent work
- Medal of Hieromartyr Gorazd (2018, Orthodox Church of the Czech Lands and Slovakia)
- Medal of the Order “For Merit to the Fatherland”, 2nd class (26 August 2016) — for active legislative work and many years of dedicated service
- Patriarchal Certificate of Merit (19 June 2016)
- Imperial Medal “Anniversary of the National Feat. 1613–2013” (2014, Russian Imperial House)
- Certificate of Honor of the Government of the Russian Federation (22 June 2016) — for contributions to legislative activity and many years of conscientious work
- Letter of Gratitude from the Government of the Russian Federation (4 July 2013) — for many years of fruitful legislative activity and the development of Russian legislation
