= Vladimir Kashin =

Russian politician (born 1948)

Vladimir Kashin MP
- Владимир Кашин
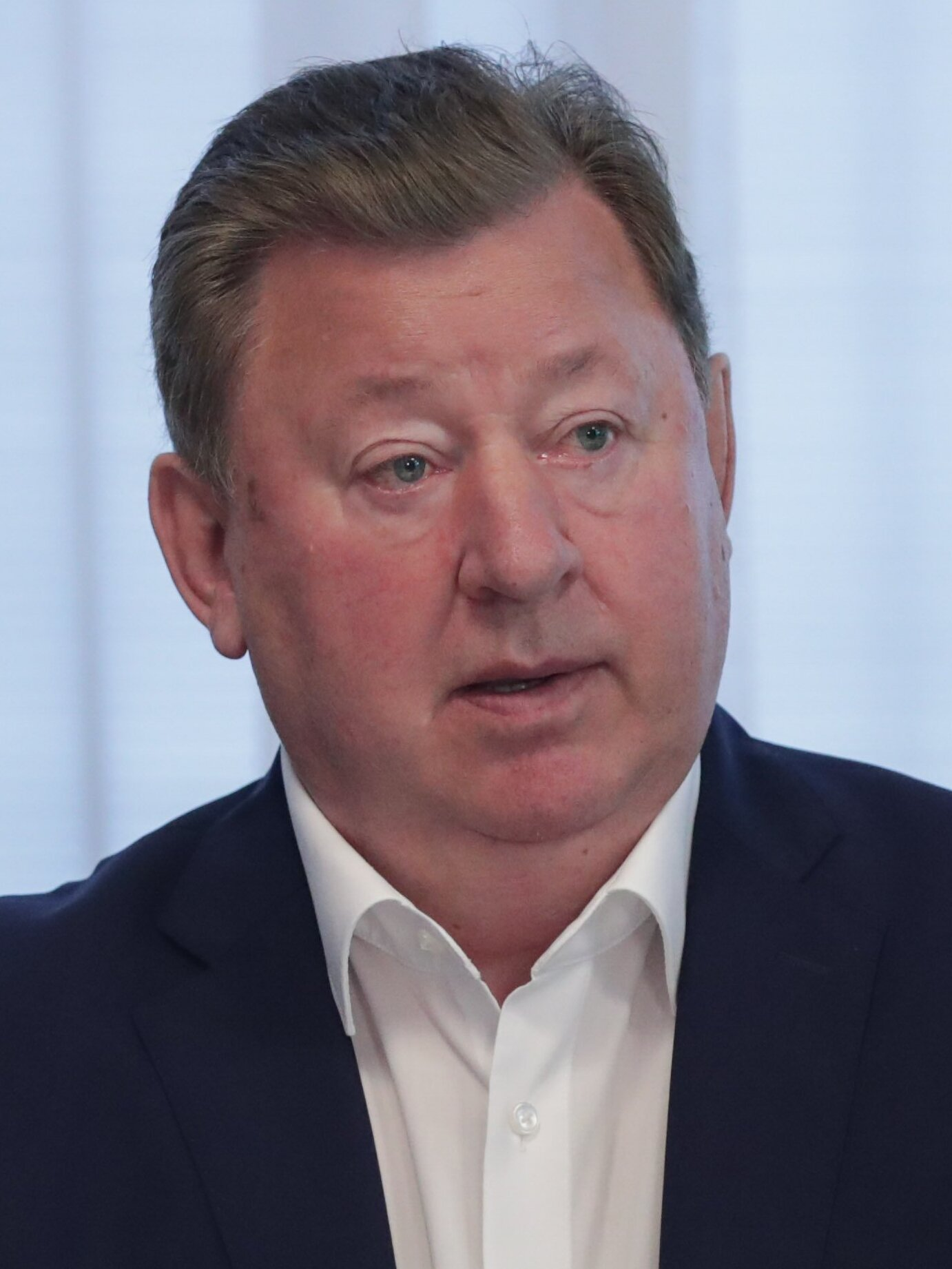
- Kashin in 2022

Chairman of the State Duma Committee on Agrarian Issues
- Incumbent
- Assumed office 5 October 2016
- Preceded by: Nikolay Pankov

Member of the State Duma
- Incumbent
- Assumed office 29 December 2003

Chairman of the State Duma Committee on Ecology and Environmental Protection
- In office 21 December 2011 – 5 October 2016
- Preceded by: Yevgeny Tugolukov
- Succeeded by: Olga Timofeeva

Personal details
- Born: 10 August 1948 (age 78) Nazaryevo, Ryazan Oblast, Russian SFSR, USSR
- Party: Ryazan State Agrotechnological University
- Occupation: Agronomist

Vladimir Ivanovich Kashin (Russian: Владимир Иванович Кашин; born 10 August 1948) is a Russian politician, who is the chairman of the State Duma Committee on Agrarian Issues since 5 October 2016.

A member of the Communist Party of the Russian Federation, he served as a member of the State Duma since 2003. He served as head of the committee on Agrarian Issues. Doctor of Sciences (1970), Academician of the Russian Academy of Agricultural Sciences (since 1997), Academician of the Russian Academy of Sciences (since 2013). Laureate of the Prize of the Council of Ministers of the Soviet Union and the Prize of the Government of the Russian Federation. Honored Scientist of the Russian Federation (2009).

He graduated from the P.A. Kostychev Ryazan State Agrotechnological University in 1971. In 1976, he defended his Candidate's Dissertation. In 1994, he defended his doctoral dissertation.

Kashin is the author of more than 150 scientific papers.

Kashin was sanctioned by the United States Department of the Treasury following the 2022 Russian invasion of Ukraine.

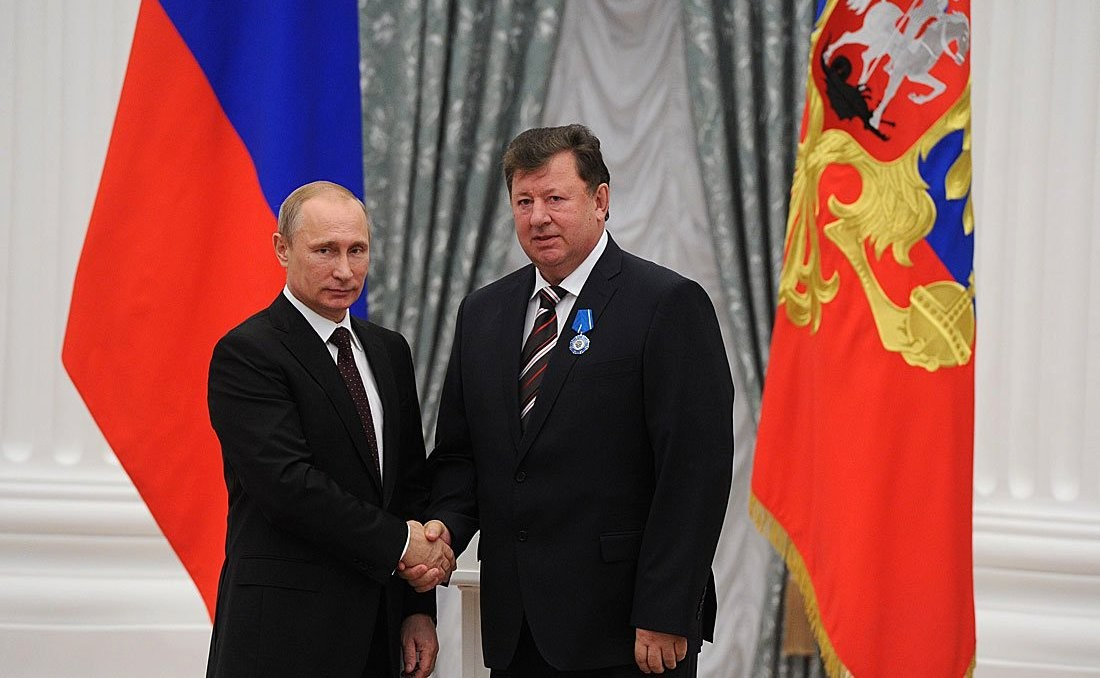
With Vladimir Putin on presentation of the Order of Honour, 31 July 2014
