= Buguruslan constituency =

Constituency in Russia

Buguruslan single-member constituency
- Constituency of the Russian State Duma

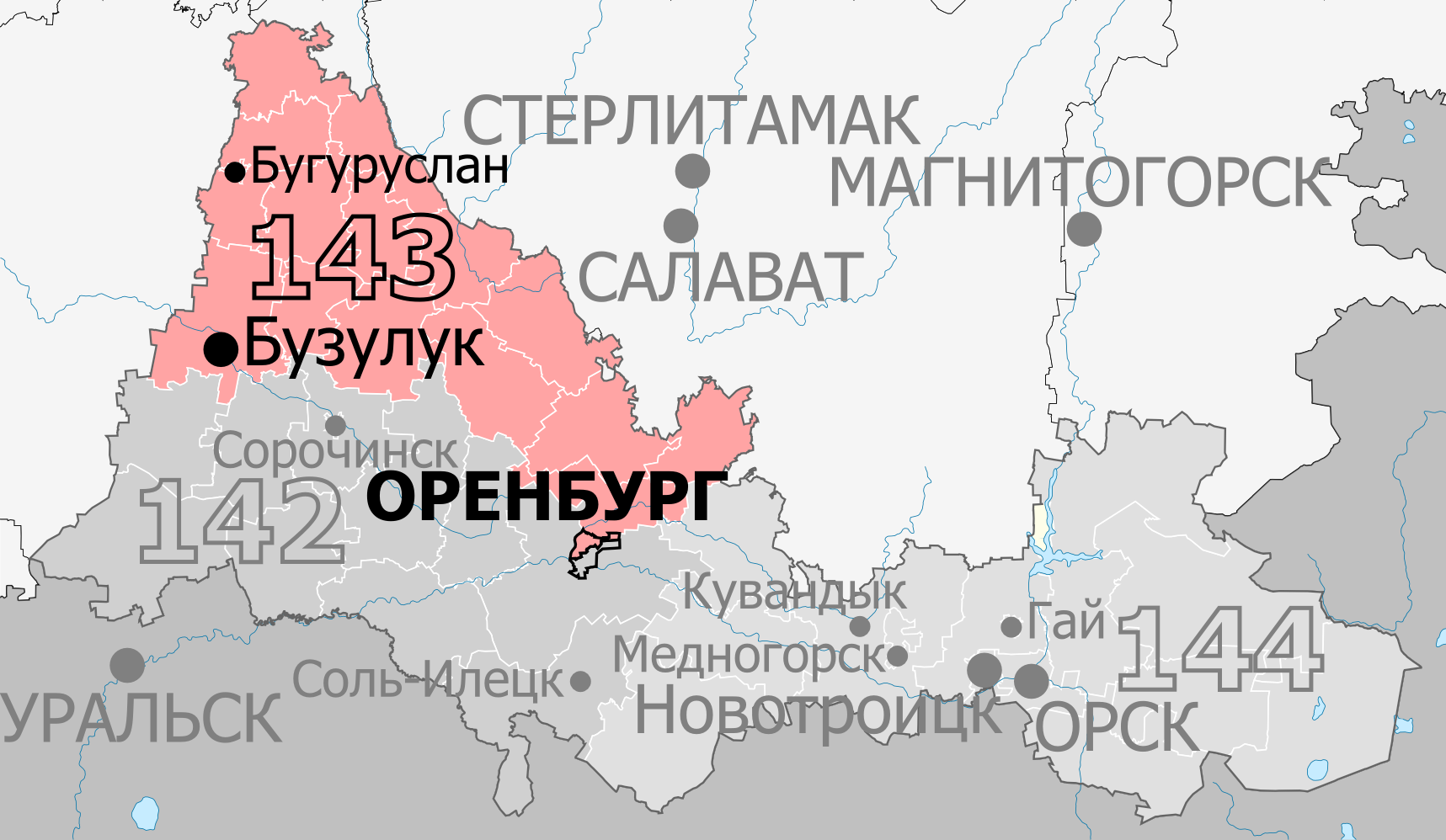
- Constituency boundaries since 2016
- Deputy: Oleg Dimov; United Russia
- Federal subject: Orenburg Oblast
- Districts: Abdulinsky, Alexandrovsky, Asekeyevsky, Buguruslan, Buguruslansky, Buzuluk, Buzuluksky, Grachyovsky, Krasnogvardeysky, Matveyevsky, Oktyabrsky, Orenburg (Dzerzhinsky, Promyshlenny), Ponomaryovsky, Sakmarsky, Severny, Sharlyksky, Tyulgansky
- Voters: 501,241 (2026)

The Buguruslan constituency (No.145 (Note: Buzuluk constituency No.131 in 1993-2007, No.143 in 2016–2026)) is a Russian legislative constituency in Orenburg Oblast. The constituency covers northern half of Orenburg as well as north-western Orenburg Oblast, including the cities Buguruslan and Buzuluk.

The constituency has been represented since 2021 by United Russia deputy Oleg Dimov, former Vice Governor of Orenburg Oblast, banker and businessman, who won the open seat left vacant by the resignation of one-term United Russia deputy Igor Sukharev.

== Boundaries ==
1993–2007 Buzuluk constituency: Abdulino, Abdulinsky District, Alexandrovsky District, Asekeyevsky District, Buguruslan, Buguruslansky District, Buzuluk, Buzuluksky District, Grachyovsky District, Ileksky District, Krasnogvardeysky District, Kurmanayevsky District, Matveyevsky District, Novosergiyevsky District, Perevolotsky District, Pervomaysky District, Ponomaryovsky District, Severny District, Sharlyksky District, Sol-Iletsk, Sol-Iletsky District, Sorochinsk, Sorochinsky District, Tashlinsky District, Totsky District
The constituency covered eastern Orenburg Oblast, including the oil-producing cities Buguruslan, Buzuluk and Sorochinsk, agricultural town Abdulino and resort town Sol-Iletsk.

2016–present: Abdulinsky District, Alexandrovsky District, Asekeyevsky District, Buguruslan, Buguruslansky District, Buzuluk, Buzuluksky District, Grachyovsky District, Krasnogvardeysky District, Matveyevsky District, Oktyabrsky District, Orenburg (Dzerzhinsky, Promyshlenny), Ponomaryovsky District, Sakmarsky District, Severny District, Sharlyksky District, Tyulgansky District
The constituency was re-created for the 2016 election and retained only its northern half, losing south-western Orenburg Oblast to Orenburg constituency. This seat instead gained northern half of Orenburg as well as Oktyabrsky, Sakmarsky and Tyulgansky districts from Orenburg constituency.

== Members elected ==
Election	Member	Party
1993	Aleksey Chernyshyov	Agrarian Party
1995	Aleksey Chernyshyov	Agrarian Party
1999	Rem Khramov	Independent
2003	Rem Khramov	United Russia
2007	Proportional representation - no election by constituency	
2011	Proportional representation - no election by constituency	
2016	Igor Sukharev (Note: appointed Vice Governor of Orenburg Oblast in July 2020)	United Russia
2021	Oleg Dimov	United Russia
2026	Oleg Dimov	United Russia

== Election results ==
=== 1993 ===
Summary of the 12 December 1993 Russian legislative election in the Buzuluk constituency
Candidate	Party	Votes	%
Aleksey Chernyshyov	Agrarian Party	127,336	38.66%
Larisa Nuzhdina	Choice of Russia	52,316	15.89%
Aleksandr Lukonin	Civic Union	32,663	9.92%
Viktor Fogel	Independent	29,333	8.91%
Aleksey Likhtin	Independent	25,693	7.80%
against all		39,132	11.88%
Total		329,334	100%

=== 1995 ===
Summary of the 17 December 1995 Russian legislative election in the Buzuluk constituency
Candidate	Party	Votes	%
Aleksey Chernyshyov (incumbent)	Agrarian Party	159,301	44.47%
Nikolay Krendelev	Congress of Russian Communities	39,753	11.10%
Aleksandr Bzhezovsky	Independent	26,600	7.43%
Tatyana Titova	Forward, Russia!	25,555	7.13%
Nikolay Biskayev	Liberal Democratic Party	17,533	4.89%
Aleksandr Lukonin	Social Democrats	15,129	4.22%
Aleksandr Vasyakin	Independent	11,676	3.26%
Vladimir Kireyev	Stanislav Govorukhin Bloc	8,383	2.34%
Yury Fomin	Independent	7,746	2.16%
against all		34,283	9.57%
Total		358,196	100%

=== 1999 ===
Summary of the 19 December 1999 Russian legislative election in the Buzuluk constituency
Candidate	Party	Votes	%
Rem Khramov	Independent	182,111	52.32%
Vladimir Yeremin	Independent	94,652	27.20%
Boris Sobolev	Congress of Russian Communities-Yury Boldyrev Movement	14,638	4.21%
Dmitry Semenov	Independent	12,510	3.59%
against all		31,682	9.10%
Total		348,048	100%

=== 2003 ===
Summary of the 7 December 2003 Russian legislative election in the Buzuluk constituency
Candidate	Party	Votes	%
Rem Khramov (incumbent)	United Russia	75,668	23.11%
Vladimir Grabovsky	Independent	37,314	11.40%
Aleksey Spiridonov	Independent	34,892	10.66%
Aleksandr Zhalybin	Independent	31,688	9.68%
Aleksandr Soluyanov	Independent	24,234	7.40%
Arman Davletlyarov	Independent	21,861	6.68%
Aleksandr Martynov	Agrarian Party	18,853	5.76%
Yury Shibin	Independent	15,521	4.74%
Aleksandr Glotov	Liberal Democratic Party	8,516	2.60%
Yegor Belov	United Russian Party Rus'	8,480	2.59%
Anatoly Lutikov	Great Russia – Eurasian Union	7,073	2.16%
against all		34,078	10.41%
Total		327,642	100%

=== 2016 ===
Summary of the 18 September 2016 Russian legislative election in the Buguruslan constituency
Candidate	Party	Votes	%
Igor Sukharev	United Russia	100,425	41.29%
Sergey Katasonov	Liberal Democratic Party	57,705	23.73%
Semyon Uralov	Communist Party	32,264	13.27%
Faik Asyayev	A Just Russia	14,273	5.87%
Nurlan Munzhasarov	Communists of Russia	10,864	4.47%
Tatyana Golovina	Rodina	4,849	1.99%
Irina Klimova	People's Freedom Party	4,698	1.93%
Maksim Shchepinov	Patriots of Russia	4,079	1.68%
Georgi Lazarov	Yabloko	3,426	1.41%
Didar Turshinov	Party of Growth	2,224	0.91%
Total		243,189	100%

=== 2021 ===
Summary of the 17-19 September 2021 Russian legislative election in the Buguruslan constituency
Candidate	Party	Votes	%
Oleg Dimov	United Russia	102,134	42.05%
Vladimir Turchin	Communist Party	57,258	23.58%
Oksana Nabatchikova	A Just Russia — For Truth	22,495	9.26%
Ivan Dubinin	Liberal Democratic Party	15,798	6.50%
Svetlana Gabdulkhakova	New People	15,026	6.19%
Kristina Rodina	Party of Pensioners	13,949	5.74%
Vladimir Kislinsky	Yabloko	4,170	1.72%
Total		242,862	100%

=== 2026 ===
Summary of the 18-20 September 2026 Russian legislative election in the Buguruslan constituency
Candidate	Party	Votes	%
Oleg Dimov (incumbent)	United Russia	173,882	62.95%
Dmitry Shantelev	Communist Party	24,973	9.04%
Oksana Nabatchikova	A Just Russia	18,558	6.72%
Vadim Bikbov	Liberal Democratic Party	17,428	6.31%
Aleksey Sizov	Communists of Russia	14,237	5.15%
Pavel Khripunov	New People	12,666	4.59%
Roman Mazharov	Party of Pensioners	8,797	3.18%
Total		276,236	100%
