= Abdrakhmanovo =

Abdrakhmanovo (Russian: Абдрахманово) is the name of several rural localities in Russia:

- Abdrakhmanovo, Aurgazinsky District, Bashkortostan, a derevnya in Tukaevsky Rural Settlement of Aurgazinsky District in the Bashkortostan
- Abdrakhmanovo, Baymaksky District, Bashkortostan, a derevnya in Tatlybaevsky Rural Settlement of Baymaksky District in the Bashkortostan
- Abdrakhmanovo, Orenburg Oblast, a selo in Abdrakhmanovskoe Rural Settlement of Abdulinsky District in the Orenburg Oblast
- Abdrakhmanovo, Sarmanovsky District, Tatarstan, a posyolok in Jalil settlement of Sarmanovsky District in the Tatarstan; 55°00′45″N 52°41′46″E
- Abdrakhmanovo, Sterlitamaksky District, Bashkortostan, a derevnya in Pervomayskiy Rural Settlement of Sterlitamaksky District in the Tatarstan
- Abdrakhmanovo, Tatarstan, a selo in Abdrakhmanovskoe Rural Settlement of Almetyevsky District in the Tatarstan
