= Yasny =

Yasny (Russian: Я́сный; masculine), Yasnaya (Я́сная; feminine), or Yasnoye (Я́сное; neuter) is the name of several inhabited localities in Russia.

Urban localities

- Yasny, Orenburg Oblast, a town in Orenburg Oblast

Rural localities

- Yasny, Amur Oblast, a settlement in Oktyabrsky Rural Settlement of Zeysky District of Amur Oblast
- Yasny, Arkhangelsk Oblast, a settlement in Shilegsky Selsoviet of Pinezhsky District of Arkhangelsk Oblast
- Yasny, Republic of Bashkortostan, a village in Dmitriyevsky Selsoviet of Ufimsky District of the Republic of Bashkortostan
- Yasny, Kursk Oblast, a khutor in Belyayevsky Selsoviet of Konyshyovsky District of Kursk Oblast
- Yasny, Mari El Republic, a settlement in Solnechny Rural Okrug of Sovetsky District of the Mari El Republic
- Yasny, Bagayevsky District, Rostov Oblast, a settlement in Manychskoye Rural Settlement of Bagayevsky District of Rostov Oblast
- Yasny, Krasnosulinsky District, Rostov Oblast, a khutor in Kovalevskoye Rural Settlement of Krasnosulinsky District of Rostov Oblast
- Yasny, Shpakovsky District, Stavropol Krai, a settlement in Tsimlyansky Selsoviet of Shpakovsky District of Stavropol Krai
- Yasny, Turkmensky District, Stavropol Krai, a settlement in Novokucherlinsky Selsoviet of Turkmensky District of Stavropol Krai
- Yasny, Tula Oblast, a settlement in Bolshe-Ozersky Rural Okrug of Plavsky District of Tula Oblast
- Yasnoye, Kaliningrad Oblast, a settlement in Yasnovsky Rural Okrug of Slavsky District of Kaliningrad Oblast
- Yasnoye, Nizhny Novgorod Oblast, a selo in Sechenovsky Selsoviet of Sechenovsky District of Nizhny Novgorod Oblast
- Yasnoye, Artyom, Primorsky Krai, a selo under the administrative jurisdiction of Artyom City Under Krai Jurisdiction in Primorsky Krai
- Yasnoye, Chuguyevsky District, Primorsky Krai, a selo in Chuguyevsky District, Primorsky Krai
- Yasnoye, Sakhalin Oblast, a selo in Tymovsky District of Sakhalin Oblast
- Yasnoye, Vologda Oblast, a settlement in Dubrovsky Selsoviet of Babayevsky District of Vologda Oblast
- Yasnaya, Kurgan Oblast, a village in Pritobolny Selsoviet of Pritobolny District of Kurgan Oblast
- Yasnaya, Zabaykalsky Krai, a settlement at the station in Olovyanninsky District of Zabaykalsky Krai

== See also ==
- Yasnensky (disambiguation)
