= Abdulinsky =

Abdulinsky (masculine), Abdulinskaya (feminine), or Abdulinskoye (neuter) may refer to:

- Abdulinsky District, a district of Orenburg Oblast, Russia
- Abdulinsky Urban Okrug, a municipal formation in Orenburg Oblast, Russia

== See also ==
- Abdulino
