= Orenburg constituency =

Constituency of the State Duma of the Russian Federation

Orenburg single-member constituency
- Constituency of the Russian State Duma

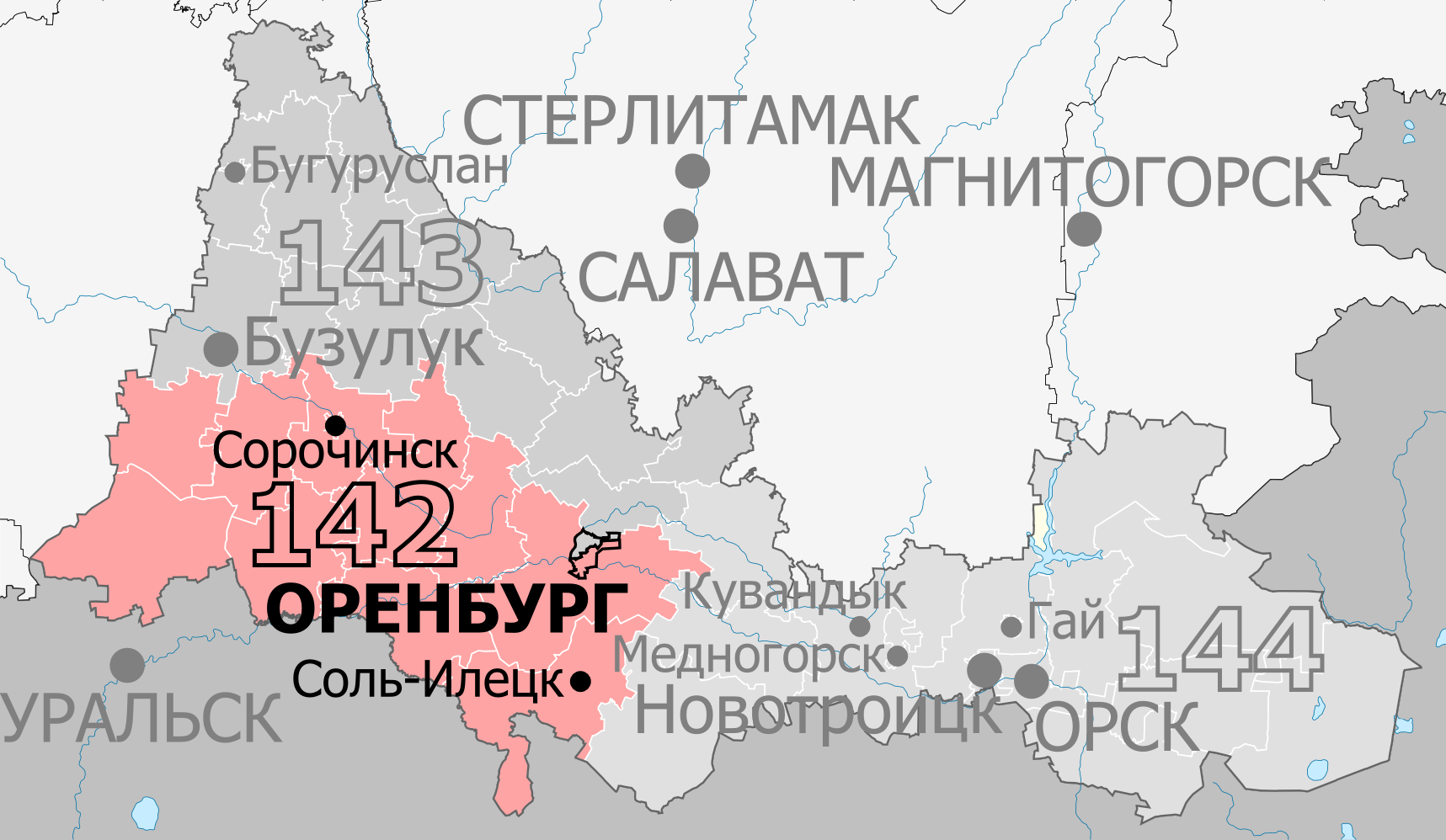
- Constituency boundaries since 2016
- Deputy: Andrey Anikeyev; United Russia
- Federal subject: Orenburg Oblast
- Districts: Ileksky, Kurmanayevsky, Novosergiyevsky, Orenburg (Leninsky, Tsentralny), Orenburgsky, Pervomaysky, Perevolotsky, Sol-Iletsk, Sorochinsk, Tashlinsky, Totsky
- Voters: 500,836 (2026)

The Orenburg constituency (No.144 (Note: No.132 in 1993-2007, No.142 in 2016–2026)) is a Russian legislative constituency in Orenburg Oblast. The constituency covers southern half of Orenburg and south-western Orenburg Oblast.

The constituency has been represented since 2021 by United Russia deputy Andrey Anikeyev, former Member of Legislative Assembly of Orenburg Oblast, businessman and cousin of State Duma member Grigory Anikeyev, who won the open seat after defeating one-term United Russia incumbent Yury Mishcheryakov in the primary.

== Boundaries ==
1993–2007: Akbulaksky District, Belyayevsky District, Oktyabrsky District, Orenburg, Orenburgsky District, Sakmarsky District, Tyulgansky District
The constituency covered the oblast capital Orenburg, its suburbs as well as central Orenburg Oblast.

2016–present: Ileksky District, Kurmanayevsky District, Novosergiyevsky District, Orenburg (Leninsky, Tsentralny), Orenburgsky District, Pervomaysky District, Perevolotsky District, Sol-Iletsk, Sorochinsk, Tashlinsky District, Totsky District
The constituency was re-created for the 2016 election and retained only southern half of Orenburg and its suburbs, losing its rural southern parts to Orsk constituency, northern half of Orenburg and its northern part – to Buguruslan constituency. The constituency gained south-western Orenburg Oblast from the former Buzuluk constituency, including resort town Sol-Iletsk and oil-producing Sorochinsk.

== Members elected ==
Election	Member	Party
1993	Tamara Zlotnikova	Yabloko
1995	Tamara Zlotnikova	Yabloko
1999	Yury Nikiforenko	Communist Party
2003	Aleksandr Kogan	United Russia
2007	Proportional representation - no election by constituency	
2011	Proportional representation - no election by constituency	
2016	Yury Mishcheryakov	United Russia
2021	Andrey Anikeyev	United Russia
2026	Andrey Anikeyev	United Russia

== Election results ==
=== 1993 ===
Summary of the 12 December 1993 Russian legislative election in the Orenburg constituency
Candidate	Party	Votes	%
Tamara Zlotnikova	Yavlinsky—Boldyrev—Lukin	59,989	23.91%
Aleksandr Zelepukhin	Agrarian Party	55,116	21.97%
Aleksandr Romanov	Choice of Russia	52,571	20.96%
Viktor Nefyodov	Civic Union	23,764	9.47%
Aleksandr Kits	Liberal Democratic Party	9,139	3.64%
against all		28,768	11.47%
Total		250,850	100%

=== 1995 ===
Summary of the 17 December 1995 Russian legislative election in the Orenburg constituency
Candidate	Party	Votes	%
Tamara Zlotnikova (incumbent)	Yabloko	98,778	30.25%
Yury Nikiforenko	Communist Party	48,167	14.75%
Vladimir Kanyukov	Independent	21,716	6.65%
Rakhim Suleymanov	Party of Economic Freedom	19,960	6.11%
Aleksandr Kits	Liberal Democratic Party	12,870	3.94%
Ivan Solodovnikov	Agrarian Party	11,176	3.42%
Vyacheslav Kuzmin	Congress of Russian Communities	10,798	3.31%
Aleksandr Romanov	Independent	10,635	3.26%
Lyudmila Kovalevskaya	Independent	9,859	3.02%
Stanislav Vasilyev	Independent	7,121	2.18%
Gennady Medvedev	Independent	6,967	2.13%
Dmitry Mankov	Kedr	6,211	1.90%
Aleksandr Golovanov	Forward, Russia!	5,331	1.63%
Boris Savitsky	Democratic Choice of Russia – United Democrats	5,194	1.59%
Aleksey Tsaryov	Ivan Rybkin Bloc	4,739	1.45%
Yevgeny Gerasimov	Social Democrats	3,067	0.94%
Mikhail Loshakrev	Independent	2,663	0.82%
Sergey Yelistratov	Independent	2,117	0.65%
Mikhail Makarov	Independent	1,081	0.33%
Yevgeny Kotolevsky	My Fatherland	1,016	0.31%
against all		25,823	7.91%
Total		326,588	100%

=== 1999 ===
Summary of the 19 December 1999 Russian legislative election in the Orenburg constituency
Candidate	Party	Votes	%
Yury Nikiforenko	Communist Party	75,669	21.92%
Tamara Zlotnikova (incumbent)	Yabloko	69,783	20.22%
Aleksandr Zaveryukha	Our Home – Russia	41,346	11.98%
Andrey Sukhov	Independent	37,367	10.83%
Tamara Semivelichenko	Independent	18,658	5.41%
Aleksandr Kits	Liberal Democratic Party	13,578	3.93%
Nina Kulikova	Independent	13,075	3.79%
Nina Setko	Women of Russia	9,408	2.73%
Rinat Ziganshin	Communists and Workers of Russia - for the Soviet Union	8,518	2.47%
Radik Sagitov	Independent	5,497	1.59%
Valentina Leontyeva	Spiritual Heritage	5,261	1.52%
Ivan Zemlyanushin	Independent	2,284	0.66%
Sergey Stolpak	Russian Socialist Party	2,101	0.61%
against all		34,476	9.99%
Total		345,183	100%

=== 2003 ===
Summary of the 7 December 2003 Russian legislative election in the Orenburg constituency
Candidate	Party	Votes	%
Aleksandr Kogan	United Russia	75,142	26.01%
Viktor Pyatnitsky	Independent	52,048	18.02%
Yury Nikiforenko (incumbent)	Communist Party	40,212	13.92%
Vladimir Frolov	Independent	30,482	10.55%
Yelena Afanasyeva	Liberal Democratic Party	15,326	5.30%
Anna Shchetinskaya	People's Party	14,013	4.85%
Nikolay Stepanov	Union of Right Forces	5,846	2.02%
Viktor Balabanov	Yabloko	5,736	1.99%
Sergey Kelep	For a Holy Russia	2,495	0.86%
Andrey Sukhov	Independent	2,049	0.71%
Viktor Serovatov	United Russian Party Rus'	985	0.34%
against all		34,817	12.05%
Total		289,288	100%

=== 2016 ===
Summary of the 18 September 2016 Russian legislative election in the Orenburg constituency
Candidate	Party	Votes	%
Yury Mishcheryakov	United Russia	92,564	42.42%
Aleksandr Karpov	Liberal Democratic Party	33,108	15.17%
Maksim Amelin	Communist Party	24,567	11.26%
Vladimir Frolov	A Just Russia	24,333	11.15%
Aleksandr Kalinin	Communists of Russia	16,578	7.60%
Vladimir Tishin	Yabloko	5,162	2.36%
Sergey Fomin	Party of Growth	4,759	2.18%
Sergey Khimich	Patriots of Russia	3,352	1.54%
Anton Rychagov	Rodina	3,316	1.52%
Sergey Stolpak	People's Freedom Party	2,200	1.01%
Total		218,204	100%

=== 2021 ===
Summary of the 17-19 September 2021 Russian legislative election in the Orenburg constituency
Candidate	Party	Votes	%
Andrey Anikeyev	United Russia	85,593	36.75%
Nurlan Munzhasarov	Communist Party	56,387	24.21%
Yekaterina Kalegina	A Just Russia — For Truth	23,188	9.96%
Aleksey Marinin	New People	16,879	7.25%
Vadim Bikbov	Liberal Democratic Party	16,707	7.17%
Vadim Khuzhakhmetov	Party of Pensioners	11,512	4.94%
Mikhail Mordvintsev	Civic Platform	5,000	2.15%
Yury Shchekin	Yabloko	3,937	1.69%
Total		232,908	100%

=== 2026 ===
Summary of the 18-20 September 2026 Russian legislative election in the Orenburg constituency
Candidate	Party	Votes	%
Andrey Anikeyev (incumbent)	United Russia	190,428	63.81%
Denis Baturin	Communist Party	37,120	12.44%
Karina Salikhova	New People	20,763	6.96%
Andrey Reyzler	Liberal Democratic Party	12,351	4.14%
Aleksandr Kolybelnikov	A Just Russia	11,416	3.83%
Nikolay Kokarev	Party of Pensioners	8,944	3.00%
Mansur Farzaliyev	Communists of Russia	8,538	2.86%
Dmitry Marukhin	The Greens	3,387	1.13%
Total		298,423	100%
