= Suzdal constituency =

Russian legislative constituency

Suzdal single-member constituency
- Constituency of the Russian State Duma

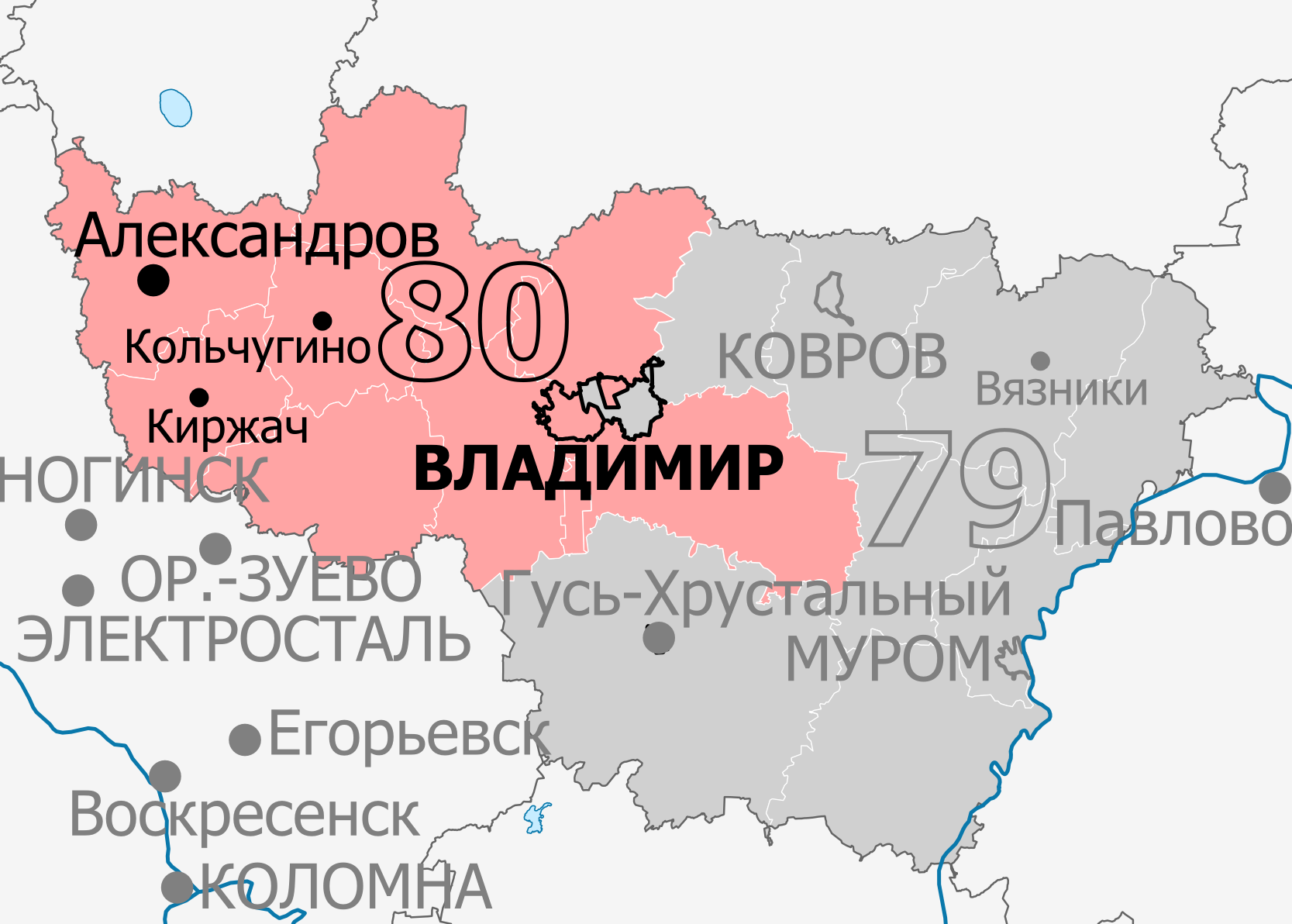
- Constituency boundaries since 2016
- Deputy: Grigory Anikeyev; United Russia
- Federal subject: Vladimir Oblast
- Districts: Alexandrovsky, Kirzhachsky, Kolchuginsky, Petushinsky, Raduzhny, Sobinsky, Sudogodsky, Suzdalsky, Vladimir (Frunzensky, Leninsky), Yuryev-Polsky
- Voters: 531,930 (2026)

The Suzdal constituency (No.84 (Note: No.80 in 2016–2026)) is a Russian legislative constituency in Vladimir Oblast. The constituency covers parts of Vladimir and western Vladimir Oblast.

The constituency has been represented since 2016 by United Russia deputy Grigory Anikeyev, five-term State Duma member and billionaire businessman.

== Boundaries ==
2016–present: Alexandrovsky District, Kirzhachsky District, Kolchuginsky District, Petushinsky District, Raduzhny, Sobinsky District, Sudogodsky District, Suzdalsky District, Vladimir (Frunzensky, Leninsky), Yuryev-Polsky District
The constituency was created for the 2016 election. It covers western Vladimir Oblast and most of Vladimir, formerly almost all of Vladimir constituency as well as Sudogodsky District from the former Kovrov constituency.

== Members elected ==
Election	Member	Party
2016	Grigory Anikeyev	United Russia
2021	Grigory Anikeyev	United Russia
2026	Grigory Anikeyev	United Russia

== Election results ==
=== 2016 ===
Summary of the 18 September 2016 Russian legislative election in the Suzdal constituency
Candidate	Party	Votes	%
Grigory Anikeyev	United Russia	138,311	64.70%
Lyudmila Bundina	Communist Party	21,167	9.90%
Valery Belyakov	A Just Russia	16,028	7.50%
Ilya Potapov	Liberal Democratic Party	15,130	7.08%
Dmitry Kushpita	Yabloko	4,937	2.31%
Sergey Klopov	Communists of Russia	4,223	1.98%
Aleksey Usachev	Rodina	2,774	1.30%
Kirill Nikolenko	People's Freedom Party	2,673	1.25%
Anna Kolesnik	Civilian Power	1,823	0.85%
Total		213,770	100%

=== 2021 ===
Summary of the 17-19 September 2021 Russian legislative election in the Suzdal constituency
Candidate	Party	Votes	%
Grigory Anikeyev (incumbent)	United Russia	94,633	48.77%
Anton Sidorko	Communist Party	42,904	22.11%
Sergey Biryukov	A Just Russia — For Truth	13,500	6.96%
Kirill Menshikov	New People	9,426	4.86%
Vladimir Rykunov	Liberal Democratic Party	8,118	4.18%
Sergey Danilov	Party of Pensioners	8,105	4.18%
Aleksey Firsov	Yabloko	4,894	2.52%
Vladimir Gogin	Rodina	3,987	2.05%
Total		194,058	100%

=== 2026 ===
Summary of the 18-20 September 2026 Russian legislative election in the Suzdal constituency
Candidate	Party	Votes	%
Grigory Anikeyev (incumbent)	United Russia	130,852	56.91%
Ivan Rostovtsev	Communist Party	34,654	15.07%
Aleksey Firsov	Yabloko	15,746	6.85%
Aleksandr Bugayev	Liberal Democratic Party	14,927	6.49%
Sergey Biryukov	A Just Russia	9,980	4.34%
Danil Kotler	New People	9,292	4.04%
Olga Kanishcheva	The Greens	6,301	2.74%
Anna Samin	Rodina	2,613	1.14%
Total		229,917	100%
