= Sol-Iletsky =

Sol-Iletsky (masculine), Sol-Iletskaya (feminine), or Sol-Iletskoye (neuter) may refer to:

- Sol-Iletsky District, a district of Orenburg Oblast, Russia
- Sol-Iletsky Urban Okrug, a municipal formation in Orenburg Oblast, Russia
