= Valentina Dorofeeva =

- Валентина Дорофеева
- Born: Valentina Alexandrovna Dorofeeva; 24 July 1937; Novoye Kudrino, Buguruslansky District, Orenburg Oblast, Russian SFSR, Soviet Union
- Died: 3 August 2018 (aged 81); Almetyevsk, Tatarstan, Russia
- Occupation: Industrialist
- Awards: Order of Labour Glory

Valentina Alexandrovna Dorofeeva (Russian: Валентина Александровна Дорофеева; 24 July 1937 – 3 August 2018) was a Soviet industrialist. She worked at the Almetyevneft Oil and Gas Production Directorate (part of the USSR Ministry of Oil Industry), Almetyevsk, Tatar Autonomous Soviet Socialist Republic (now called Tatarstan) and worked there in various roles for 31 years from 1956 to 1987. Dorofeeva was a full Cavalier of the Order of Labour Glory.

== Biography ==
Dorofeeva was born to a working-class family in the village of Novoye Kudrino, Buguruslansky District, Orenburg Oblast on 24 July 1937. Prior to the Great Patriotic War, her mother died soon after giving birth and her father was killed in battle in 1942. Dorofeeva and her younger sister were brought up by their paternal aunt.

Following the completion of her education, she enrolled and later graduated from the Buguruslan Oil Technical School, Buguruslan in 1955. Dorofeeva was employed at the Almetyevneft Oil and Gas Production Directorate (part of the USSR Ministry of Oil Industry), Almetyevsk, Tatar Autonomous Soviet Socialist Republic (today Tatarstan) as an oil production operator at Oil Field No. 1 on 1 August 1956, working in various jobs at the factory over the course of her career. In 1963, she was appointed the head of a team of operators at the Tikhonovsky Commodity Park. From 1964 to 1987, Dorofeeva was an operator of the integrated oil preparation and pumping shop (IOPP) of NGDU Almetyevneft.

She was a member of the Communist Party of the Soviet Union. Between 1976 and 1984, Dorofeeva was secretary of the party organisation of the Integrated Oil Preparation and Pumping Shop No. 1 of the Almetyevneft Oil and Gas Production Directorate. She retired in 1987. Dorofeeva died in Almetyevsk on 3 August 2018.

== Recognition ==
On 21 April 1975 and 2 March 1981, she was presented with the Order of Labour Glory, 3rd and 2nd class. Dorofeeva was awarded Order of Labour Glory, 1st class on 29 April 1986, becoming a full Cavalier of the Order of Labour Glory. She was conferred the title of Honorary Oilman of OAO Tatneft in 2012. Dorofeeva was presented with the Excellent Worker of the Oil Industry and the Shock Worker of the 10th Five-Year Plan medals. A bust of her is located at the Alley of Heroes at the Gorodskoy Park Im. 60-Letiya Nefti Tatarstana, Almetyevsk.
