= Sorochinsky =

Sorochinsky (masculine), Sorochinskaya (feminine), or Sorochinskoye (neuter) may refer to:

- Sorochinsky District, a district of Orenburg Oblast, Russia
- Sorochinsky Urban Okrug, a municipal formation in Orenburg Oblast, Russia
