= Abdrakhmanovo, Orenburg Oblast =

Abdrakhmanovo Абдрахманово
- Selo
- Location within Orenburg Oblast Location within Russia
- Coordinates: 54°02′N 53°30′E
- Country: Russia
- Region: Orenburg Oblast
- District: Abdulinsky District
- Time zone: [[UTC+5:00]]

Abdrakhmanovo (Russian: Абдрахманово) is a rural locality (a selo) and the administrative center of Abdrakhmanovsky Selsoviet of Abdulinsky District, Orenburg Oblast, Russia. The population was 345 as of 2010. There are 6 streets.

== Geography ==
Abdrakhmanovo is located 45 km north of Abdulino (the district's administrative centre) by road. Nikolkino is the nearest rural locality.
