= Raduzhny Urban Okrug =

Location of Khanty-Mansi Autonomous Okrug in Russia

Location of Vladimir Oblast in Russia

Raduzhny Urban Okrug is the name of several municipal formations in Russia. The following administrative divisions are incorporated as such:

- City of okrug significance of Raduzhny, Khanty-Mansi Autonomous Okrug
- Closed Administrative-Territorial Formation of Raduzhny, Vladimir Oblast

== See also ==
- Raduzhny (disambiguation)
