= Orenburgsky =

Orenburgsky (masculine), Orenburgskaya (feminine), or Orenburgskoye (neuter) may refer to:

- Orenburgsky District, a district of Orenburg Oblast, Russia
- Orenburg Oblast (Orenburgskaya oblast), a federal subject of Russia
- Orenburgskoye, a rural locality (a selo) in Khabarovsk Krai, Russia
