= Vladimir constituency =

Legislative constituency in Vladimir Oblast, Russia

Vladimir single-member constituency
- Constituency of the Russian State Duma

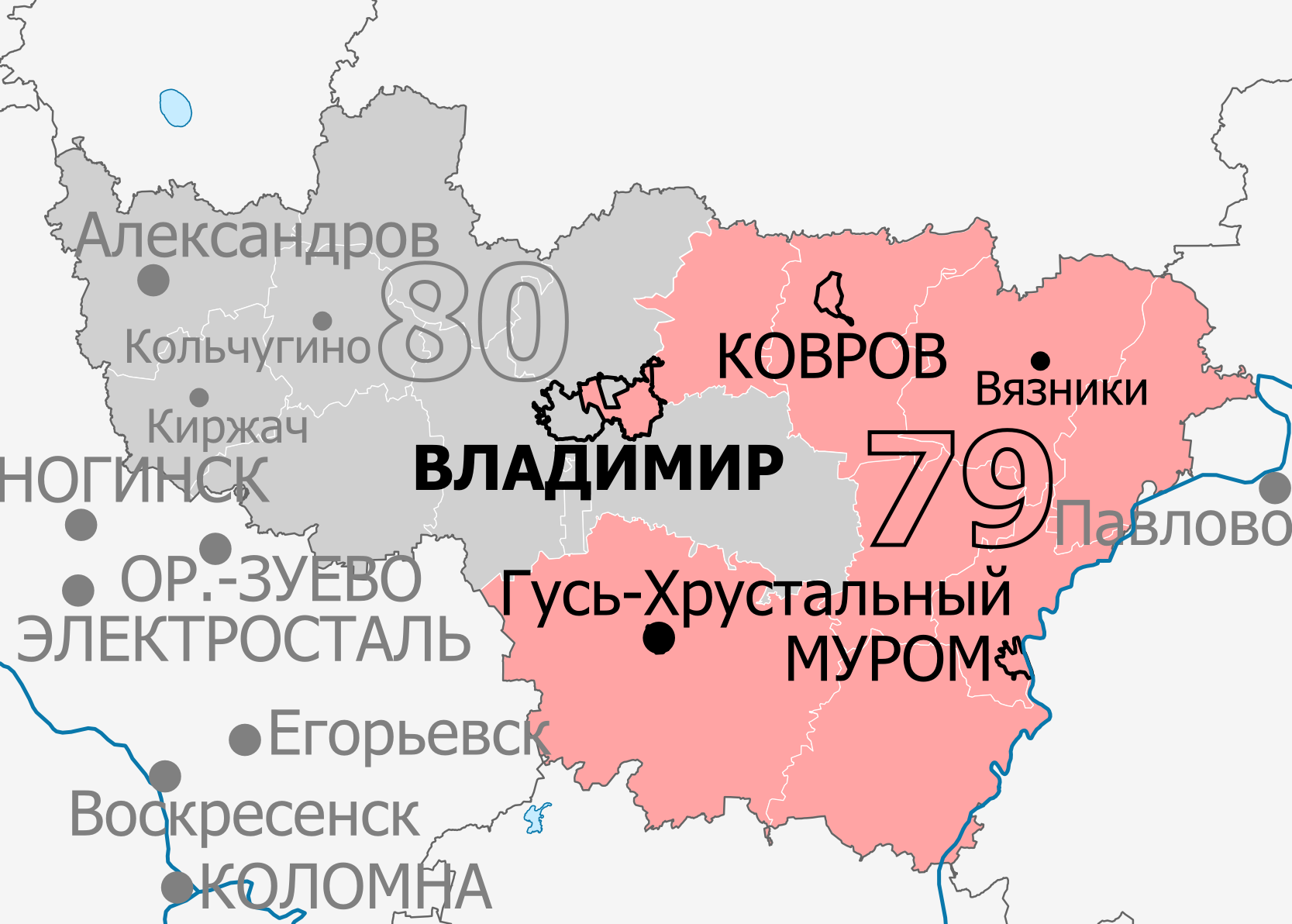
- Constituency boundaries since 2016
- Deputy: Igor Igoshin; United Russia
- Federal subject: Vladimir Oblast
- Districts: Gorokhovetsky, Gus-Khrustalny, Gus-Khrustalny District, Kameshkovsky, Kovrov, Kovrovsky, Melenkovsky, Murom, Muromsky, Selivanovsky, Vladimir (Oktyabrsky), Vyaznikovsky
- Voters: 522,203 (2026)

The Vladimir constituency (No.83 (Note: No.67 in 1993-1995, No.66 in 1995-2003, No.68 in 2003-2007, No.79 in 2016–2026)) is a Russian legislative constituency in Vladimir Oblast. The constituency covers half of Vladimir and eastern part of Vladimir Oblast.

The constituency has been represented since 2003 (except for 2007–2016) by United Russia deputy Igor Igoshin, seven-term State Duma member and agribusinessman.

== Boundaries ==
1993–2007: Alexandrov, Alexandrovsky District, Kirzhachsky District, Kolchugino, Kolchuginsky District, Petushinsky District, Raduzhny, Sobinka, Sobinsky District, Suzdal, Suzdalsky District, Vladimir, Yuryev-Polsky District
The constituency covered western Vladimir Oblast, including the oblast capital of Vladimir, cities of Alexandrov, Kolchugino, Sobinka and Suzdal.

Since 2016: Gorokhovetsky District, Gus-Khrustalny, Gus-Khrustalny District, Kameshkovsky District, Kovrov, Kovrovsky District, Melenkovsky District, Murom, Muromsky District, Selivanovsky District, Vladimir (Oktyabrsky), Vyaznikovsky District
The constituency was re-created for the 2016 election and it retained Oktyabrsky city district of Vladimir, losing the rest to new Suzdal constituency. This seat instead eastern Vladimir Oblast from the former Kovrov constituency.

== Members elected ==
Election	Member	Party
1993	Gennady Churkin	Agrarian Party
1995	Gennady Churkin	Agrarian Party
1999	Gennady Churkin	Independent
2003	Igor Igoshin	Communist Party
2007	Proportional representation - no election by constituency	
2011	Proportional representation - no election by constituency	
2016	Igor Igoshin	United Russia
2021	Igor Igoshin	United Russia
2026	Igor Igoshin	United Russia

== Election results ==
=== 1993 ===
Summary of the 12 December 1993 Russian legislative election in the Vladimir constituency
Candidate	Party	Votes	%
Gennady Churkin	Agrarian Party	69,856	18.69%
Leonid Shergin	Yavlinsky–Boldyrev–Lukin	–	12.20%
Viktor Alyakrinsky	Independent	–	–
Leonid Girik	Independent	–	–
Nikolay Obnorsky	Communist Party	–	–
Viktor Yefimov	Party of Russian Unity and Accord	–	–
Total		373,691	100%

=== 1995 ===
Summary of the 17 December 1995 Russian legislative election in the Vladimir constituency
Candidate	Party	Votes	%
Gennady Churkin (incumbent)	Agrarian Party	77,916	18.41%
Pavel Voshchanov	Independent	55,618	13.14%
Aleksandr Tikhonov	Tikhonov-Tupolev-Tikhonov	55,115	13.02%
Yury Tsypkin	My Fatherland	39,891	9.43%
Leonid Shergin	Yabloko	30,467	7.20%
Vladimir Gvozdaryov	Liberal Democratic Party	16,632	3.93%
Nadezhda Sibirina	Zemsky Sobor	15,568	3.68%
Yury Leontyev	Independent	13,572	3.21%
Boris Belyakov	League of Independent Scientists	11,102	2.62%
Andrey Yeremenko	Stanislav Govorukhin Bloc	10,724	2.53%
Emilia Burtseva	Union of Patriots	9,193	2.17%
Mikhail Borovkov	Independent	6,189	1.46%
Vladimir Chertogorov	Stable Russia	5,347	1.26%
Vladimir Zabuga	Beer Lovers Party	4,875	1.15%
against all		56,302	13.30%
Total		423,243	100%

=== 1999 ===
Summary of the 19 December 1999 Russian legislative election in the Vladimir constituency
Candidate	Party	Votes	%
Gennady Churkin (incumbent)	Independent	63,698	16.56%
Igor Artyomov	Independent	57,463	14.94%
Sergey Kazakov	Union of Right Forces	56,499	14.69%
Tatyana Maksimova	Independent	45,734	11.89%
Aleksey Lyalin	Unity	22,247	5.78%
Anatoly Ravin	Independent	15,192	3.95%
Yevgeny Limonov	Independent	13,739	3.57%
Valentina Pavina	Independent	12,775	3.32%
Nikolay Fedorov	Communists and Workers of Russia - for the Soviet Union	12,060	3.14%
Gennady Volkov	Independent	11,716	3.05%
Vladimir Antropov	Independent	7,361	1.91%
Aleksandr Ilyin	Spiritual Heritage	6,107	1.59%
Yury Khokhorin	Independent	3,947	1.03%
Nikolay Gastello	Kedr	2,001	0.52%
against all		45,694	11.88%
Total		384,641	100%

=== 2003 ===
Summary of the 7 December 2003 Russian legislative election in the Vladimir constituency
Candidate	Party	Votes	%
Igor Igoshin	Communist Party	65,137	21.26%
Igor Artyomov	Independent	54,983	17.94%
Gennady Churkin (incumbent)	Agrarian Party	31,669	10.33%
Nikolay Andrianov	Great Russia – Eurasian Union	26,887	8.77%
Sergey Kazakov	Union of Right Forces	23,020	7.51%
Galina Yesyakova	Party of Russia's Rebirth-Russian Party of Life	19,199	6.26%
Aleksandr Leontyev	Russian Pensioners' Party-Party of Social Justice	13,695	4.47%
Semyon Malakhovsky	Liberal Democratic Party	5,915	1.93%
Anton Belyakov	Independent	4,763	1.55%
Anatoly Ivashkevich	Independent	2,490	0.81%
Sergey Dulov	Independent	1,847	0.60%
Aleksandr Shikunov	Independent	1,098	0.36%
Anatoly Volkov	Independent	948	0.31%
against all		48,859	15.94%
Total		306,859	100%

=== 2016 ===
Summary of the 18 September 2016 Russian legislative election in the Vladimir constituency
Candidate	Party	Votes	%
Igor Igoshin	United Russia	119,349	53.08%
Larisa Yemelyanova	Communist Party	26,880	11.95%
Vladimir Sipyagin	Liberal Democratic Party	22,592	10.05%
Timur Markov	A Just Russia	15,746	7.00%
Sergey Kazakov	Civic Platform	9,351	4.16%
Sergey Petukhov	Communists of Russia	6,703	2.98%
Aleksey Yefremov	Yabloko	4,769	2.12%
Aleksey Mayorov	Party of Growth	4,725	2.11%
Aleksey Avdokhin	Rodina	4,099	1.82%
Kirill Kovalev	The Greens	3,242	1.44%
Total		224,847	100%

=== 2021 ===
Summary of the 17-19 September 2021 Russian legislative election in the Vladimir constituency
Candidate	Party	Votes	%
Igor Igoshin (incumbent)	United Russia	102,222	47.86%
Larisa Yemelyanova	Communist Party	51,747	24.23%
Sergey Kornishov	Liberal Democratic Party	12,838	6.01%
Aleksey Zakutin	Party of Pensioners	9,900	4.64%
Andrey Marinin	A Just Russia — For Truth	9,675	4.53%
Sergey Kazakov	Russian Party of Freedom and Justice	7,954	3.72%
Olga Smirnova	Rodina	5,065	2.37%
Dmitry Kushpita	Yabloko	3,264	1.53%
Nikolay Kvashennikov	Party of Growth	2,394	1.12%
Total		213,589	100%

=== 2026 ===
Summary of the 18-20 September 2026 Russian legislative election in the Vladimir constituency
Candidate	Party	Votes	%
Igor Igoshin (incumbent)	United Russia	163,800	62.97%
Vadim Serebrov	Communist Party	36,093	13.87%
Sergey Kornishov	Liberal Democratic Party	23,201	8.92%
Yegor Solovyov	New People	15,272	5.87%
Maksim Chernov	A Just Russia	7,270	2.79%
Rafael Petrosyan	The Greens	4,717	1.81%
Boris Chernyshev	Rodina	4,453	1.71%
Total		260,140	100%
