= Raduzhny =

Raduzhny (masculine), Raduzhnaya (feminine), or Raduzhnoye (neuter) may refer to:

- Raduzhny (inhabited locality) (Raduzhnaya, Raduzhnoye), name of several inhabited localities in Russia
- Raduzhny Urban Okrug, name of several urban okrugs in Russia
