= Yasnensky =

Yasnensky (masculine), Yasnenskaya (feminine), or Yasnenskoye (neuter) may refer to:

- Yasnensky District, a district of Orenburg Oblast, Russia
- Yasnensky Urban Okrug, a municipal formation in Orenburg Oblast, Russia
