= Administrative divisions of Orenburg Oblast =

Administrative districts of Russian federal subject

Orenburg Oblast Russia
- Administrative center: Orenburg

Administrative structure (as of 2012)
- Districts: 35
- Cities/towns: 12
- Urban-type settlements: 0
- Selsovets and settlement councils: 575

Municipal structure (as of 2002)
- Rural settlements: 1,742 (inhabited); 27 (uninhabited)

Orenburg Oblast is a federal subject of Russia.

== Administrative and municipal divisions ==
Map

Division		Structure		OKATO	OKTMO	Rural
Division		Administrative	Municipal	OKATO	OKTMO	Rural
Komarovsky (Комаровский)		urban-type settlement (ZATO)	urban okrug	53 555	53 755	
Orenburg (Оренбург)		city	urban okrug	53 401	53 701	
↳	Dzerzhinsky (Дзержинский)	(under Orenburg)	—N/a	53 401	—N/a	1 selsovet
↳	Leninsky (Ленинский)	(under Orenburg)	—N/a	53 401	—N/a	2 selsovets
↳	Promyshlenny (Промышленный)	(under Orenburg)	—N/a	53 401	—N/a	2 selsovets
↳	Tsentralny (Центральный)	(under Orenburg)	—N/a	53 401	—N/a	1 selsovet
Abdulino (Абдулино)		city	(under Abdulinsky)	53 404	53 603	
Buguruslan (Бугуруслан)		city	urban okrug	53 408	53 708	1 selsovet
Buzuluk (Бузулук)		city	urban okrug	53 412	53 712	
Gay (Гай)		city	urban okrug	53 413	53 713	1 settlement council
Kuvandyk (Кувандык)		city	(under Kuvandyksky)	53 414	53 624	
Mednogorsk (Медногорск)		city	urban okrug	53 415	53 715	1 selsovet
Novotroitsk (Новотроицк)		city	urban okrug	53 420	53 720	3 selsovets
Orsk (Орск)		city	urban okrug	53 423	53 723	
↳	Leninsky (Ленинский)	(under Orsk)	—N/a	53 423	—N/a	
↳	Oktyabrsky (Октябрьский)	(under Orsk)	—N/a	53 423	—N/a	1 selsovet
↳	Sovetsky (Советский)	(under Orsk)	—N/a	53 423	—N/a	3 selsovets
Sol-Iletsk (Соль-Илецк)		city	urban okrug	53 425	53 725	
Sorochinsk (Сорочинск)		city	urban okrug	53 427	53 727	
Yasny (Ясный)		city	(under Yasnensky)	53 432	53 659	
Abdulinsky (Абдулинский)		district	urban okrug	53 203	53 603	14 selsovets
Adamovsky (Адамовский)1		district		53 204	53 604	10 selsovets; 2 settlement councils
Akbulaksky (Акбулакский)		district		53 205	53 605	16 selsovets; 1 settlement council
Alexandrovsky (Александровский)		district		53 206	53 606	14 selsovets
Asekeyevsky (Асекеевский)		district		53 207	53 607	21 selsovets
Belyayevsky (Беляевский)		district		53 210	53 610	10 selsovets; 1 settlement council
Buguruslansky (Бугурусланский)		district		53 211	53 611	15 selsovets
Buzuluksky (Бузулукский)		district		53 212	53 612	28 selsovets; 1 settlement council
Gaysky (Гайский)		district	(under Gay)	53 214	53 713	6 selsovets; 2 settlement councils
Grachyovsky (Грачёвский)		district		53 215	53 615	13 selsovets
Dombarovsky (Домбаровский)		district		53 217	53 617	6 selsovets; 1 settlement council
Ileksky (Илекский)		district		53 219	53 619	15 selsovets
Kvarkensky (Кваркенский)		district		53 222	53 622	12 selsovets; 2 settlement councils
Krasnogvardeysky (Красногвардейский)		district		53 223	53 623	16 selsovets
Kuvandyksky (Кувандыкский)		district	urban okrug	53 224	53 624	18 selsovets
Kurmanayevsky (Курманаевский)		district		53 225	53 625	17 selsovets
Matveyevsky (Матвеевский)		district		53 227	53 627	16 selsovets
Novoorsky (Новоорский)		district		53 230	53 630	7 selsovets; 2 settlement councils
Novosergiyevsky (Новосергиевский)		district		53 231	53 631	18 selsovets; 1 settlement council
Oktyabrsky (Октябрьский)		district		53 233	53 633	15 selsovets
Orenburgsky (Оренбургский)		district		53 234	53 634	30 selsovets; 1 settlement council
Pervomaysky (Первомайский)		district		53 236	53 636	16 selsovets
Perevolotsky (Переволоцкий)		district		53 237	53 637	18 selsovets; 1 settlement council
Ponomaryovsky (Пономарёвский)		district		53 238	53 638	16 selsovets
Sakmarsky (Сакмарский)		district		53 240	53 640	15 selsovets; 1 settlement council
Saraktashsky (Саракташский)		district		53 241	53 641	19 selsovets; 1 settlement council
Svetlinsky (Светлинский)		district		53 242	53 642	9 selsovets; 1 settlement council
Severny (Северный)		district		53 243	53 643	17 selsovets
Sol-Iletsky (Соль-Илецкий)		district	(under Sol-Iletsk)	53 244	53 725	21 selsovets
Sorochinsky (Сорочинский)		district	(under Sorochinsk)	53 250	53 727	15 selsovets
Tashlinsky (Ташлинский)		district		53 251	53 251	18 selsovets
Totsky (Тоцкий)		district		53 252	53 652	22 selsovets
Tyulgansky (Тюльганский)		district		53 253	53 653	14 selsovets; 1 settlement council
Sharlyksky (Шарлыкский)		district		53 256	53 656	17 selsovets
Yasnensky (Ясненский)		district	urban okrug	53 259	53 659	6 selsovets
