= Raduzhny (inhabited locality) =

Raduzhny (Russian: Ра́дужный; masculine), Raduzhnaya (Ра́дужная; feminine), or Raduzhnoye (Ра́дужное; neuter) is the name of several inhabited localities in Russia.

Urban localities

- Raduzhny, Khanty-Mansi Autonomous Okrug, a town in Khanty-Mansi Autonomous Okrug
- Raduzhny, Vladimir Oblast, a town in Vladimir Oblast

Rural localities

- Raduzhny, Republic of Kalmykia, a settlement in Adykovskaya Rural Administration of Chernozemelsky District of the Republic of Kalmykia
- Raduzhny, Magadan Oblast, a settlement in Olsky District of Magadan Oblast
- Raduzhny, Moscow Oblast, a settlement in Raduzhnoye Rural Settlement of Kolomensky District of Moscow Oblast
- Raduzhnoye, Chechen Republic, a selo in Groznensky District of the Chechen Republic
- Raduzhnoye, Samara Oblast, a selo in Syzransky District of Samara Oblast
- Raduzhnaya, a village in Aksinyinskoye Rural Settlement of Stupinsky District of Moscow Oblast

Abolished inhabited localities

- Raduzhny, Kirov Oblast, a former urban-type settlement in Kirov Oblast; since 2005—a part of the city of Kirov
