= Andrey Anikeyev =

Russian politician (born 1961)

- Андрей Аникеев
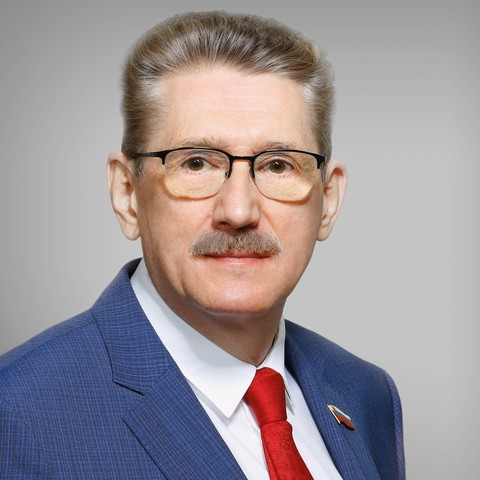
- official portrait, circa 2021

Member of the State Duma for Orenburg Oblast
- Incumbent
- Assumed office 12 October 2021
- Preceded by: Yury Mishcheryakov
- Constituency: Orenburg (No. 142)

Personal details
- Born: 16 December 1961 (age 64) Moscow, RSFSR, USSR
- Party: United Russia
- Relatives: Grigory Anikeyev (cousin)

Andrey Anatolyevich Anikeyev (Russian: Андрей Анато́льевич Анике́ев; born 16 December 1961, Moscow, Russian Soviet Federative Socialist Republic) is a Russian political figure, deputy of the 8th State Duma convocation. In the 1990s he moved to Orenburg where he headed the Open Joint Stock Company "ORENTEKS" that specializes on the textile industry. In 2005 he was awarded a Candidate of Economics Sciences degree from the Moscow Academy of the Labor Market and Information Technology. From 2000 to 2002 he was a deputy of the Orenburg City Council and later became a deputy of the Orenburg Legislative Assembly of the 3rd (2002-2006) and 6th (2016-2021) convocations. In 2021, he entered the list of the wealthiest deputies in the Legislative Assembly. In September 2021 he was elected to the State Duma of 8th convocation where he represents the Orenburg Oblast. He ran with the United Russia.

Since 2005, Anikeyev has served as President of the Athletics Federation of the Orenburg Region. Since 2016, he has also been a member of the Presidium of the All-Russian Athletics Federation.

== Sanctions ==
Due to his support of Russian aggression and the violation of Ukraine’s territorial integrity during the Russo-Ukrainian war, Anikeev is subject to personal sanctions imposed by multiple countries: all European Union member states, the United Kingdom, the United States of America (in this case, on the grounds of “supporting the Kremlin’s efforts to undermine Ukraine’s sovereignty and territorial integrity” and “complicity in Putin’s war”, Canada, Switzerland, Australia, Japan, and New Zealand. In accordance with the decree of Ukrainian president Volodymyr Zelenskyy dated September 7, 2022, he is also under Ukrainian sanctions.

On March 22, 2023, a Ukrainian court sentenced Anikeev in absentia to 15 years in prison with property confiscation under charges related to encroachment on the territorial integrity and inviolability of Ukraine.
