= Oleg Dimov =

Russian politician (born 1968)

- Олег Димов
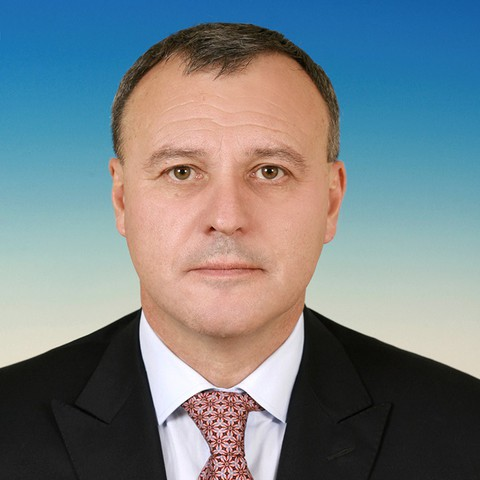
- official portrait, circa 2021

Member of the State Duma for Orenburg Oblast
- Incumbent
- Assumed office 12 October 2021
- Preceded by: Igor Sukharev
- Constituency: Buguruslan (No. 143)

Personal details
- Born: 8 March 1968 (age 58) Vladychen', Bolhrad Raion, Odesa Oblast, Ukrainian SSR, Soviet Union
- Party: United Russia
- Education: The Novosibirsk Higher Military-Political Combined Arms School

Oleg Dmitrievich Dimov (Russian: Олег Дмитриевич Димов; born 8 March 1968, Vladychen', Bolhrad Raion) is a Russian political figure and a deputy of the 8th State Duma.

In 1989 Dimov graduated from The Novosibirsk Higher Military-Political Combined Arms School. Until 1993, he served in the army. He then worked as head of security at Yuzhny Ural Bank, and as deputy director of the bank (1993–1996); deputy general director of Svyaz-Invest CJSC (1997–2001); deputy general director of Promtekhmontazh CJSC; president of the Promtekhmontazh group of companies; and chairman of the boards of directors of Reserve LLC and Promtekhmontazhstroy LLC (2001–2007).

In 2013 he was awarded the Doctor of Sciences degree in economics. From 2004 to 2010, he was the deputy of the Orenburg City Council. He left the post to become Deputy Head of the City of Orenburg. In 2011, Dimov was appointed the vice-governor and the Chief of Staff of the Governor and Government of the Orenburg oblast. From 2013-to 2015, he was Deputy Prime Minister of the Orenburg Oblast.

In September 2021, Oleg Dimov was elected deputy for the 8th State Duma. He joined the working group on relations with the parliaments of the Benelux Union.

== Sanctions ==
He was sanctioned by Canada under the Special Economic Measures Act (S.C. 1992, c. 17) in relation to the Russian invasion of Ukraine for Grave Breach of International Peace and Security, and by the UK government in 2022 in relation to Russo-Ukrainian War.
