= Kovrov constituency =

Russian legislative constituency

Kovrov single-member constituency
- Constituency of the Russian State Duma

- Constituency boundaries from 1993 to 2007
- Deputy: None
- Federal subject: Vladimir Oblast
- Districts: Gorokhovetsky, Gus-Khrustalny, Gus-Khrustalny District, Kameshkovsky, Kovrov, Kovrovsky, Melenkovsky, Murom, Muromsky, Selivanovsky, Sudogodsky, Vyaznikovsky
- Voters: 584,236 (2003)

The Kovrov constituency (No.69 (Note: Sudogda constituency No.68 in 1993-1995, No.67 in 1995-2003)) was a Russian legislative constituency in Vladimir Oblast in 1993–2007. It covered eastern Vladimir Oblast. The seat was last occupied by Communist deputy Viktor Pautov, who defeated two-term incumbent State Duma member Yevgeny Buchenkov in the 1999 election.

The constituency was dissolved in 2007 when State Duma adopted full proportional representation for the next two electoral cycles. Kovrov constituency was not re-established for the 2016 election, currently most of former Kovrov constituency is part of Vladimir constituency.

== Boundaries ==
1993–1995 Sudogda constituency: Gorokhovetsky District, Gus-Khrustalny, Gus-Khrustalny District, Kameshkovsky District, Kovrov, Kovrovsky District, Melenkovsky District, Murom, Muromsky District, Selivanovsky District, Sudogodsky District Vyazniki, Vyaznikovsky District
The constituency covered eastern Vladimir Oblast, including the towns of Gus-Khrustalny, Kovrov, Murom and Vyazniki.

1995–2007: Gorokhovetsky District, Gus-Khrustalny, Gus-Khrustalny District, Kameshkovsky District, Kovrov, Kovrovsky District, Melenkovsky District, Murom, Muromsky District, Selivanovsky District, Sudogodsky District Vyazniki, Vyaznikovsky District
The constituency retained its territory but changed its name from Sudogda to Kovrov constituency.

== Members elected ==
Election	Member	Party
1993	Yevgeny Buchenkov	Agrarian Party
1995	Yevgeny Buchenkov	Communist Party
1999	Viktor Pautov	Communist Party
2003	Viktor Pautov	Independent

== Election results ==
=== 1993 ===
==== Declared candidates ====
- Yevgeny Buchenkov (APR), former Member of Vladimir Oblast Council of People's Deputies (1990–1993), sovkhoz director
- Leonid Kulikov (YaBL), former Chairman of the Kovrov City Council of People's Deputies (1990–1993)
- Yevgeny Saburov (Independent), former Member of Committee for Operative Management of National Economy of the Soviet Union (1991), former Deputy Premier of the Russian SFSR – Ministry of Economy (1991)

==== Withdrawn candidates ====
- Aleksandr Sinyagin (CPRF), former Member of Vladimir Oblast Council of People's Deputies (1987–1993), middle school principal

==== Results ====
Summary of the 12 December 1993 Russian legislative election in the Sudogda constituency
Candidate	Party	Votes	%
Yevgeny Buchenkov	Agrarian Party	156,370	43.68%
Yevgeny Saburov	Independent	94,241	26.32%
Leonid Kulikov	Yavlinsky–Boldyrev–Lukin	15,208	4.25%
against all		70,369	19.66%
Total		358,013	100%

=== 1995 ===
==== Declared candidates ====
- Boris Andrianov (Independent), tractor plant foreman
- Yevgeny Buchenkov (CPRF), incumbent Member of State Duma (1994–present)
- Aleksandr Kardanov (Stable Russia), businessman
- Sergey Knyazkov (Independent), Member of Legislative Assembly of Vladimir Oblast (1994–present)
- Aleksandr Merkushev (K–TR–zSS), Deputy Chairman of the Kovrov City Council of People's Deputies (1995–present), military electronics institute researcher
- Lyudmila Nemchinova (BIR), businesswoman
- Vladimir Rameykov (Independent), construction executive
- Nikolay Sarafannikov (Independent), military commissioner of Kovrov
- Igor Trifonov (KRO), rector of Kovrov Technological Institute (1991–present)
- Vladimir Zaychikov (Independent), law firm director
- Boris Zhukov (LDPR), coordinator of the party regional office

==== Results ====
Summary of the 17 December 1995 Russian legislative election in the Kovrov constituency
Candidate	Party	Votes	%
Yevgeny Buchenkov (incumbent)	Communist Party	83,359	21.13%
Sergey Knyazkov	Independent	63,395	16.07%
Igor Trifonov	Congress of Russian Communities	41,471	10.51%
Vladimir Zaychikov	Independent	40,008	10.14%
Boris Zhukov	Liberal Democratic Party	37,247	9.44%
Aleksandr Merkushev	Communists and Working Russia - for the Soviet Union	15,692	3.98%
Boris Andrianov	Independent	13,256	3.36%
Lyudmila Nemchinova	Ivan Rybkin Bloc	11,982	3.04%
Nikolay Sarafannikov	Independent	11,287	2.86%
Vladimir Rameykov	Independent	9,914	2.51%
Aleksandr Kardanov	Stable Russia	5,330	1.35%
against all		49,340	12.51%
Total		394,511	100%

=== 1999 ===
==== Declared candidates ====
- Yevgeny Buchenkov (DPA), incumbent Member of State Duma (1994–present)
- Nina Chaykovskaya (Nikolayev–Fyodorov Bloc), Member of Legislative Assembly of Vladimir Oblast (1996–present), rector of Vladimir State University, Murom branch
- Sergey Konin (Independent), businessman
- Konstantin Morozov (Yabloko), former People's Deputy of Russia (1990–1993)
- Nikolay Mokrov (OVR), businessman
- Viktor Pautov (CPRF), GAZ executive
- Viktor Shokhrin (Independent), Member of Gus-Khrustalny City Council of People's Deputies (1997–present), individual entrepreneur
- Pyotr Sukhorukov (Independent), attorney
- Igor Trifonov (Independent), rector of Kovrov Technological Institute (1991–present), 1995 candidate for this seat
- Yury Vlasov (SPS), former Governor of Vladimir Oblast (1991–1996)
- Andrey Yepishov (Independent), energy businessman
- Natalia Zabolotnaya (NDR), Member of Kovrov City Council of People's Deputies, food production businesswoman

==== Withdrawn candidates ====
- Vladimir Polyakov (Independent)
- Aleksandr Tyurnikov (Independent), Member of Legislative Assembly of Vladimir Oblast (1996–present)

==== Failed to qualify ====
- Sergey Basov (RSP), bank bankruptcy trustee
- Viktor Chernyshov (KTR–zSS)
- Aleksey Nikonov (For Civil Dignity)
- Aleksandr Sokolov (DN), pensioner

==== Did not file ====
- Alan Khasiyev (Russian Party), ecological activist
- Igor Kulakov (LDPR)
- Aleksandr Pleshanov (Nur), financial expert
- Vladimir Sokolov (Independent), businessman
- Vladimir Trifonov (Independent)
- Sergey Vinogradov (Independent)
- Yelena Voloshenyuk (Independent)

==== Results ====
Summary of the 19 December 1999 Russian legislative election in the Kovrov constituency
Candidate	Party	Votes	%
Viktor Pautov	Communist Party	66,296	19.54%
Yury Vlasov	Union of Right Forces	53,563	15.79%
Andrey Yepishov	Independent	26,986	7.95%
Sergey Konin	Independent	22,468	6.62%
Igor Trifonov	Independent	21,874	6.45%
Nina Chaykovskaya	Andrey Nikolayev and Svyatoslav Fyodorov Bloc	19,073	5.62%
Konstantin Morozov	Yabloko	18,431	5.43%
Sergey Shokhrin	Independent	18,339	5.41%
Yevgeny Buchenkov (incumbent)	Movement in Support of the Army	17,033	5.02%
Natalia Zabolotnaya	Our Home – Russia	11,993	3.54%
Pyotr Sukhorukov	Independent	8,141	2.40%
Nikolay Mokrov	Fatherland – All Russia	5,875	1.73%
against all		38,794	11.43%
Total		339,260	100%

=== 2003 ===
==== Declared candidates ====
- Dmitry Bodrov (LDPR), Kovrov State Technological Academy senior lecturer
- Tatyana Chertoritskaya (Independent), former Member of State Duma (1994–1995)
- Anatoly Gusev (SPS), Member of Vladimir City Council of People's Deputies (2002–present)
- Oleg Kotrov (United Russia), transportation executive
- Valery Kuzin (Independent), Deputy Chairman of the Kovrov City Council of People's Deputies
- Vadim Melkov (PVR-RPZh), businessman
- Viktor Pautov (Independent), incumbent Member of State Duma (2000–present)
- Igor Shubnikov (VR–ES), union leader
- Vladimir Sokolov (Independent), Member of Kovrov City Council of People's Deputies (2002–present), 1999 candidate for this seat
- Igor Trifonov (Independent), rector of Kovrov State Technological Academy (1991–present), 1995 and 1999 candidate for this seat
- Oleg Zamorin (Independent), businessman

==== Did not file ====
- Mikhail Buyanov (KPR), journalist
- Nikolay Grigoryev (Independent), appraiser
- Kirill Kovalev (Greens), middle school teacher
- Aleksey Kovezin (Unity), unemployed
- Georgy Shpilevsky (PME), pensioner

==== Results ====
Summary of the 7 December 2003 Russian legislative election in the Kovrov constituency
Candidate	Party	Votes	%
Viktor Pautov (incumbent)	Independent	96,795	35.34%
Oleg Kotrov	United Russia	37,506	13.69%
Dmitry Bodrov	Liberal Democratic Party	19,730	7.20%
Oleg Zamorin	Independent	17,915	6.54%
Igor Trifonov	Independent	16,163	5.90%
Vadim Melkov	Party of Russia's Rebirth-Russian Party of Life	15,353	5.60%
Tatyana Chertoritskaya	Independent	8,130	2.97%
Anatoly Gusev	Union of Right Forces	6,637	2.42%
Valery Kuzin	Independent	5,430	1.98%
Igor Shubnikov	Great Russia – Eurasian Union	4,181	1.53%
against all		39,721	14.50%
Total		274,119	100%
