= Igor Igoshin =

Russian politician (born 1970)

- Игорь Игошин
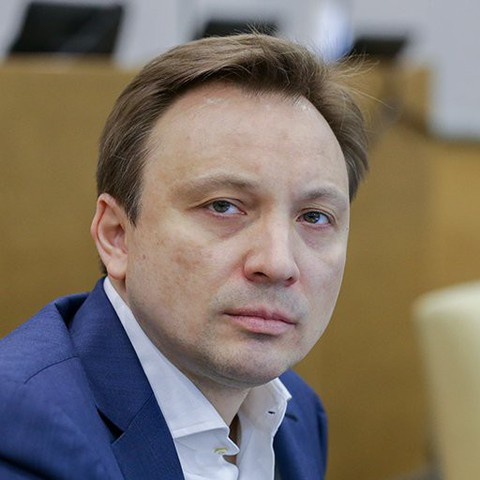

Member of the State Duma for Vladimir Oblast
- Incumbent
- Assumed office 5 October 2016
- Preceded by: constituency re-established
- In office 29 December 2003 – 24 December 2007
- Preceded by: Gennady Churkin
- Succeeded by: constituencies abolished
- Constituency: Vladimir (No. 79)

Member of the State Duma (Party List Seat)
- In office 24 December 2007 – 5 October 2016
- In office 18 January 2000 – 29 December 2003

Personal details
- Born: 11 December 1970 (age 55) Kirov, Kirov Oblast, Russian SFSR, USSR
- Party: United Russia (from 2004); CPRF (until 2003)
- Children: 4
- Education: All-Russian Distance Institute of Finance and Economics

Igor Nikolaevich Igoshin (Russian: Игорь Николаевич Игошин; born 11 December 1970, Kirov, Kirov Oblast) is a Russian political figure and a deputy of 3rd, 4th, 5th, 6th, 7th, and 8th State Dumas. In 2004, he was awarded a Doctor of Sciences in Economics and Political Sciences. His dissertation was notable for plagiarism.

From 1995 to 1998, he worked as the CEO of the JSC "Agroproduct". In 1999 he was elected deputy of the 3rd State Duma. In 2003, 2007, 2011, 2016, and 2021 he was re-elected for the 4th, 5th, 6th, 7th, and 8th State Dumas respectively. He represents the Vladimir constituency.

== Public Activities ==
During the spread of the coronavirus infection, Igor Igoshin took part in volunteer work: he provided food and medicine to people in high-risk groups — the elderly, large families, and people with disabilities — and drove therapists from the regional center to house calls.

== Awards ==
- Honorary Badge of the State Duma “For Merit in the Development of Parliamentarism” (2015)
- Medal of the Order “For Merit to the Fatherland,” 2nd Class (2016)
- Letter of Appreciation from the Government of the Russian Federation (2020) — for contributions to legislative work aimed at addressing the strategic objectives of the country’s socio-economic development
- Letter of Appreciation from the Chairman of the State Duma of the Federal Assembly of the Russian Federation (2023) — for contributions to lawmaking and the development of parliamentarism in the Russian Federation

== Sanctions ==
He was sanctioned by the UK government in 2022 in relation to the Russo-Ukrainian War.
