= Abdrakhmanovo, Sterlitamaksky District, Bashkortostan =

Abdrakhmanovo Абдрахманово Абдрахман Abdraxman
- Village
- Location within Bashkortostan Location within Russia
- Coordinates: 53°51′N 55°27′E
- Country: Russia
- Region: Bashkortostan
- District: Sterlitamaksky District
- Time zone: [[UTC+5:00]]

Abdrakhmanovo (Russian: Абдрахманово; Bashkir: Абдрахман, Abdraxman) is a rural locality (a village) in Pervomaysky Selsoviet of Sterlitamaksky District, Bashkortostan, Russia. The population was 260 as of 2010. There are 3 streets.

== Geography ==
Abdrakhmanovo is located 50 km northwest of Sterlitamak (the district's administrative centre) by road. Pervomayskoye is the nearest rural locality.

== Ethnicity ==
The village is inhabited by Bashkirs and others.
