= Abdrakhmanovo, Baymaksky District, Bashkortostan =

Abdrakhmanovo Абдрахманово Абдрахман Abdraxman
- Village
- Location within Bashkortostan Location within Russia
- Coordinates: 52°33′N 58°37′E
- Country: Russia
- Region: Bashkortostan
- District: Baymaksky District
- Time zone: [[UTC+5:00]]

Abdrakhmanovo (Russian: Абдрахманово; Bashkir: Абдрахман, Abdraxman) is a rural locality (a village) in Tatlybayevsky Selsoviet of Baymaksky District, Bashkortostan, Russia. The population was 239 as of 2010. There are 4 streets.

== Geography ==
Abdrakhmanovo is located 38 km east of Baymak (the district's administrative centre) by road. Karyshkino is the nearest rural locality.

== Ethnicity ==
The village is inhabited by Bashkirs and others.
