= Grigory Anikeyev =

Russian politician (born 1972)

Grigory Anikeev
- Григорий Аникеев
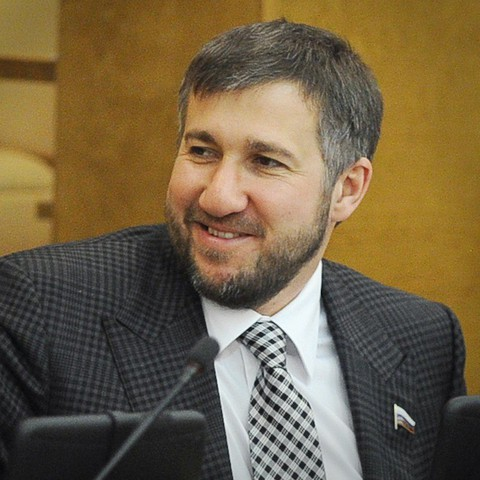

Member of the State Duma for Vladimir Oblast
- Incumbent
- Assumed office 5 October 2016
- Preceded by: constituency established
- Constituency: Suzdal (No. 80)

Member of the State Duma (Party List Seat)
- In office 24 December 2007 – 5 October 2016

Personal details
- Born: 28 February 1972 (age 54) Dutovo, Vuktyl, Komi ASSR, Russian SFSR, USSR
- Party: United Russia
- Spouse: Olga Polyakova (divorced)
- Children: Artem Grigorovich (son)
- Relatives: Andrey Anikeyev (cousin)
- Education: Vladimir State Technical University
- Occupation: Businessman

Grigory Viktorovich Anikeyev (Russian: Григорий Викторович Аникеев; born 28 February 1972 in Dutovo, Komi Republic) is a Russian politician and member of the State Duma of the Russian Federation.

Anikeyev draw attention in April 2018 when he was named the member of State Duma of the Russian Federation with the highest income in 2017. According to his personal tax declaration, his 2017 income amounted to RUB 4.3 billion (close to $70 million), showing an astonishing 717% growth from 2016.

State Duma deputy Andrey Anikeyev is Grigory's cousin.

== Sanctions ==
He was sanctioned by the UK government in 2022 in relation to the Russo-Ukrainian War.

== Assets ==
As of 2012, Anikeev is a shareholder in 17 and the owner of 16 companies.

His company, ABI Group, is involved in meat processing and construction, as well as trade, transport services, and the media business, а также торговлей, транспортными услугами и медиабизнесом.

According to Slon.ru, in 2013 he held the largest foreign bank account among members of the State Duma, with 370 million rubles in the Swiss bank UBS.

Until 2015, he was included in Forbes magazine’s list of the richest businessmen in Russia, with an estimated net worth of $400 million.

According to a joint investigation by Dubai Unlocked and the Organized Crime and Corruption Reporting Project (OCCRP), in March 2022, Anikeev purchased a penthouse in Dubai, located on the top floor of the luxury Serenia Residences complex on Palm Jumeirah. The penthouse has an area of 1,195 square meters and was purchased for over $13 million. Earlier, in November 2023, this property was also reported on by associates of Alexei Navalny.

The investigation also revealed that Anikeev’s former wife, Olga Polyakova, in April 2022, purchased two apartments on Palm Jumeirah in a premium-class residential complex, with a combined value of approximately $3 million. Another of Anikeev’s "partners", Irina Kuparieva, also purchased apartments of more than 140 square meters in Serenia Residences in April 2022.

== Criticism ==
He was criticized by Dmitry Gudkov and Ilya Ponomarev, members of the "A Just Russia" party, for simultaneously conducting business activities while serving as a deputy[31]. He was included in their compiled list titled “United Russia’s Golden Pretzels”.
