= Abdrakhmanovo, Aurgazinsky District, Bashkortostan =

Abdrakhmanovo Абдрахманово Абдрахман Abdraxman
- Village
- Location within Bashkortostan Location within Russia
- Coordinates: 53°51′N 55°27′E
- Country: Russia
- Region: Bashkortostan
- District: Aurgazinsky District
- Time zone: UTC+5:00

Abdrakhmanovo (Russian: Абдрахманово; Bashkir: Абдрахман, Abdraxman) is a rural locality (a village) in Tukayevsky Selsoviet of Aurgazinsky District, Bashkortostan, Russia. The population was 147 as of 2010. There are 3 streets.

== Geography ==
Abdrakhmanovo is located 31 km north of Tolbazy (the district's administrative centre) by road. Akhmetovo is the nearest rural locality.

== Ethnicity ==
The village is inhabited by Tatars and Bashkirs.
