= Yasny, Amur Oblast =

Yasny Ясный
- Settlement
- Location within Amur Oblast Location within Russia
- Coordinates: 53°17′N 127°59′E
- Country: Russia
- Region: Amur Oblast
- District: Zeysky District
- Time zone: UTC+9:00

Yasny (Russian: Ясный) is a rural locality (a settlement) in Oktyabrsky Selsoviet of Zeysky District, Amur Oblast, Russia. The population was 8 as of 2018.

== Geography ==
Yasny is located near the left bank of the Dep River, 171 km southeast of Zeya (the district's administrative centre) by road. Yubileyny is the nearest rural locality.
