= Yasny, Republic of Bashkortostan =

Yasny Ясный
- Village
- Location within Bashkortostan Location within Russia
- Coordinates: 54°48′03″N 55°46′26″E
- Country: Russia
- Region: Bashkortostan
- District: Ufimsky District
- Time zone: UTC+5:00

Yasny (Russian: Ясный) is a rural locality (a village) in Dmitriyevsky Selsoviet, Ufimsky District, Bashkortostan, Russia. The population was 51 as of 2010. There are 3 streets.

== Geography ==
Yasny is located 19 km northwest of Ufa (the district's administrative centre) by road. Dmitriyevka is the nearest rural locality.
