= Vyazniki =

Vyazniki (Russian: Вязники) is the name of several inhabited localities in Russia.

Urban localities

- Vyazniki, Vladimir Oblast, a town in Vyaznikovsky District of Vladimir Oblast

Rural localities

- Vyazniki, Samara Oblast, a settlement in Kinel-Cherkassky District of Samara Oblast
- Vyazniki, Stavropol Krai, a khutor in Verkhnerussky Selsoviet of Shpakovsky District in Stavropol Krai
- Vyazniki, Tambov Oblast, a settlement in Bogdanovsky Selsoviet of Rzhaksinsky District in Tambov Oblast
- Vyazniki, Voronezh Oblast, a khutor in Selyavinskoye Rural Settlement of Liskinsky District in Voronezh Oblast
