= Abdulinsky Urban Okrug =

Municipal formation in Orenburg Oblast, Russia

Abdulinsky Urban Okrug Абдулинский городско́й о́круг
- Urban okrug
- Interactive map of Abdulinsky Urban Okrug
- Coordinates: 53.759°N 53.441°E
- Country: Russia
- Oblast: Orenburg
- Established: 2015

Abdulinsky Urban Okrug (Russian: Абдулинский городско́й о́круг) is a municipal formation (an urban okrug) in Orenburg Oblast, Russia, one of the thirteen urban okrugs in the oblast. Its territory comprises the territories of two administrative divisions of Orenburg Oblast—Abdulinsky District and the Town of Abdulino.

It was established on July 10, 2015 by the Law #3240/876-V-OZ of Orenburg Oblast by merging the municipal formations of former Abdulinsky Municipal District and granting the resulting entity urban okrug status.

== Sources ==
- Законодательное Собрание Оренбургской области. Закон №2367/495-IV-ОЗ от 15 сентября 2008 г. «Об утверждении перечня муниципальных образований Оренбургской области и населённых пунктов, входящих в их состав», в ред. Закона №3322/917-V-ОЗ от 24 августа 2015 г. «О внесении изменений в Закон Оренбургской области "Об утверждении перечня муниципальных образований Оренбургской области и населённых пунктов, входящих в их состав"». Вступил в силу через 10 дней после официального опубликования. Опубликован: "Бюллетень Законодательного Собрания Оренбургской области", 22 заседание, I часть, 29 августа 2008 г. (Legislative Assembly of Orenburg Oblast. Law #2367/495-IV-OZ of September 15, 2008 On Adopting the Registry of the Municipal Formations of Orenburg Oblast and the Inhabited Localities They Comprise, as amended by the Law #3322/917-V-OZ of August 24, 2015 On Amending the Law of Orenburg Oblast "On Adopting the Registry of the Municipal Formations of Orenburg Oblast and the Inhabited Localities They Comprise". Effective as of after 10 days following the official publication.).
- Законодательное Собрание Оренбургской области. Закон №3240/876-V-ОЗ от 26 июня 2015 г. «О преобразовании муниципальных образований, расположенных на территории Абдулинского района Оренбургской области», в ред. Закона №3459/973-V-ОЗ от 12 ноября 2015 г. «О внесении изменений в отдельные законодательные акты Оренбургской области». Вступил в силу через десять дней после официального опубликования (согласно статье 1, новое муниципальное образование считается образованным с 10 июля 2015 г.). Опубликован: "Оренбуржье", №79, 30 июня 2015 г. (Legislative Assembly of Orenburg Oblast. Law #3240/876-V-OZ of June 26, 2015 On the Transformation of the Municipal Formations on the Territory of Abdulinsky District of Orenburg Oblast, as amended by the Law #3459/973-V-OZ of November 12, 2015 On Amending Various Legislative Acts of Orenburg Oblast. Effective as of the day which is ten days after the official publication (according to Article 1, the new municipal formation is established effective July 10, 2015).).
- Правительство Оренбургской области. Постановление №4-п от 10 января 2008 г. «О перечне административно-территориальных единиц Оренбургской области», в ред. Постановления №776-п от 6 октября 2015 г. «О внесении изменения в постановление Правительства Оренбургской области от 10.01.2008 №4-п». Вступил в силу со дня официального опубликования. Опубликован: "Оренбуржье", №№7, 15, 19, 23, 17 января, 31 января, 7 февраля, 14 февраля 2008 г. (Government of Orenburg Oblast. Resolution #4-p of January 10, 2008 On the Registry of the Administrative-Territorial Units of Orenburg Oblast, as amended by the Resolution #776-p of October 6, 2015 On Amending the Resolution of Orenburg Oblast #4-p of January 10, 2008. Effective as of the official publication date.).
