= Abdrakhmanovo, Tatarstan =

Abdrakhmanovo Абдрахманово
- Selo
- Location within Tatarstan Location within Russia
- Coordinates: 54°46′N 52°29′E
- Country: Russia
- Region: Tatarstan
- District: Almetyevsky District
- Time zone: [[UTC+3:00]]

Abdrakhmanovo (Russian: Абдрахманово; Tatar: Габдрахман, Ğabdraxman) is a rural locality (a selo) and the administrative center of Abdrakhmanovskoye Rural Settlement of Almetyevsky District, Tatarstan, Russia. The population was 1650 as of 2017. There are 19 streets.

== Geography ==
The village is located on the Zay River, 22 km southeast of Almetyevsk (the district's administrative centre) by road. Taysuganovo is the nearest rural locality.

== Ethnicity ==
The village is inhabited by Tatars and others.
