= Yasny, Kursk Oblast =

Rural locality in Kursk Oblast, Russia

Yasny Ясный
- Khutor
- Interactive map of Yasny
- Location of Yasny Yasny (Kursk Oblast)
- Coordinates: 51°53′33″N 34°58′14″E
- Country: Russia
- Federal subject: Kursk Oblast
- Administrative district: Konyshyovsky District
- SelsovietSelsoviet: Belyayevsky

Population (2010 Census)
  - Total: 5
  - Estimate (2010): 5 (0%)

Municipal status
  - Municipal district: Konyshyovsky Municipal District
  - Rural settlement: Belyayevsky Selsoviet Rural Settlement
- Time zone: UTC+3 (MSK)
- Postal code: 307632
- Dialing code: +7 47156
- OKTMO ID: 38616404131
- Website: беляевский.рф

Yasny (Russian: Ясный) is a rural locality (a khutor) in Belyayevsky Selsoviet Rural Settlement, Konyshyovsky District, Kursk Oblast, Russia. Population: 5 (2010 census); 23 (2002 census);

== Geography ==
The khutor is located on the Svapa River (right tributary of the Seym River), 39 km from the Russia–Ukraine border, 86 km north-west of Kursk, 22 km north-west of the district center – the urban-type settlement Konyshyovka, 10 km from the selsoviet center – Belyayevo.

Climate

Yasny has a warm-summer humid continental climate (Dfb in the Köppen climate classification).

== Transport ==
Yasny is located 33 km from the federal route M-3 Ukraine Highway, 62 km from the route M-2 Crimea Highway, 22 km from the route A-142 (Trosna – M3 highway), 23 km from the road of regional importance 38K-038 (Fatezh – Dmitriyev), 24 km from the road 38K-005 (Konyshyovka – Zhigayevo – 38K-038), 5.5 km from the road 38K-003 (Dmitriyev – Beryoza – Menshikovo – Khomutovka), 20.5 km from the road 38K-023 (Lgov – Konyshyovka), 9 km from the road of intermunicipal significance 38H-144 (Konyshyovka – Makaro-Petrovskoye, with the access road to the villages of Belyayevo and Chernicheno), 1.5 km from the road 38Н-458 (38N-144 – Nischneje Pessotschnoje), 16.5 km from the nearest railway halt 536 km (railway line Navlya – Lgov-Kiyevsky).

The rural locality is situated 92 km from Kursk Vostochny Airport, 177 km from Belgorod International Airport and 293 km from Voronezh Peter the Great Airport.
