= Yasny, Orenburg Oblast =

Town in Orenburg Oblast, Russia

Yasny Ясный
- Town
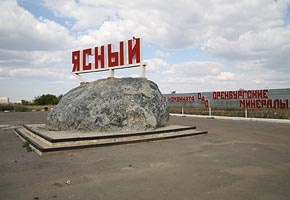

- Coat of arms
- Interactive map of Yasny
- Location of Yasny Yasny (Orenburg Oblast)
- Coordinates: 51°03′N 59°58′E
- Country: Russia
- Federal subject: Orenburg Oblast
- Founded: 1961
- Town status since: 1979
- Elevation: 360 m (1,180 ft)

Population (2010 Census)
  - Total: 17,363
  - Estimate (2021): 15,471 (−10.9%)

Administrative status
  - Subordinated to: Town of Yasny
  - Capital of: Yasnensky District, Town of Yasny

Municipal status
  - Urban okrug: Yasnensky Urban Okrug
  - Capital of: Yasnensky Urban Okrug
- Time zone: UTC+5 (MSK+2)
- Postal codes: 462780, 462781
- Dialing code: +7 35368
- OKTMO ID: 53732000001

Yasny (Russian: Я́сный) is a town in Orenburg Oblast, Russia, located 502 kilometers (312 mi) southeast of Orenburg, the administrative center of the oblast. Population: 17,363 (2010 census); 18,545 (2002 census); 26,587 (1989 Soviet census).

== History ==
It was founded in 1961, granted urban-type settlement status in 1962, and town status in 1979.

== Administrative and municipal status ==
Within the framework of administrative divisions, Yasny serves as the administrative center of Yasnensky District, even though it is not a part of it. As an administrative division, it is incorporated separately as the Town of Yasny—an administrative unit with the status equal to that of the districts. As a municipal division, the territories of the Town of Yasny and of Yasnensky District are incorporated as Yasnensky Urban Okrug.

== Space industry ==
The Dombarovsky Cosmodrome, located near Yasny, is a rocket launch site. Launches from Dombarovsky include orbital Dnepr launches, for ISC Kosmotras.
