= Sorochinsky Urban Okrug =

Sorochinsky Urban Okrug (Russian: Сорочинский городско́й о́круг) is a municipal formation (an urban okrug) in Orenburg Oblast, Russia, one of the thirteen urban okrugs in the oblast. Its territory comprises the territories of two administrative divisions of Orenburg Oblast—Sorochinsky District and the Town of Sorochinsk.

It was established on June 1, 2015 by the Law #2824/781-V-OZ of Orenburg Oblast by merging the municipal formations of former Sorochinsky Municipal District and granting the resulting entity urban okrug status.
