= Sol-Iletsky Urban Okrug =

Sol-Iletsky Urban Okrug (Russian: Соль-Илецкий городско́й о́круг) is a municipal formation (an urban okrug) in Orenburg Oblast, Russia, one of the thirteen urban okrugs in the oblast. Its territory comprises the territories of two administrative divisions of Orenburg Oblast—Sol-Iletsky District and the Town of Sol-Iletsk.

It was established on May 1, 2015 by the Law #3028/833-V-OZ of Orenburg Oblast by merging the municipal formations of former Sol-Iletsky Municipal District and granting the resulting entity urban okrug status.
