= Yasnensky District =

Yasnensky District Ясненский район (Russian)
- District
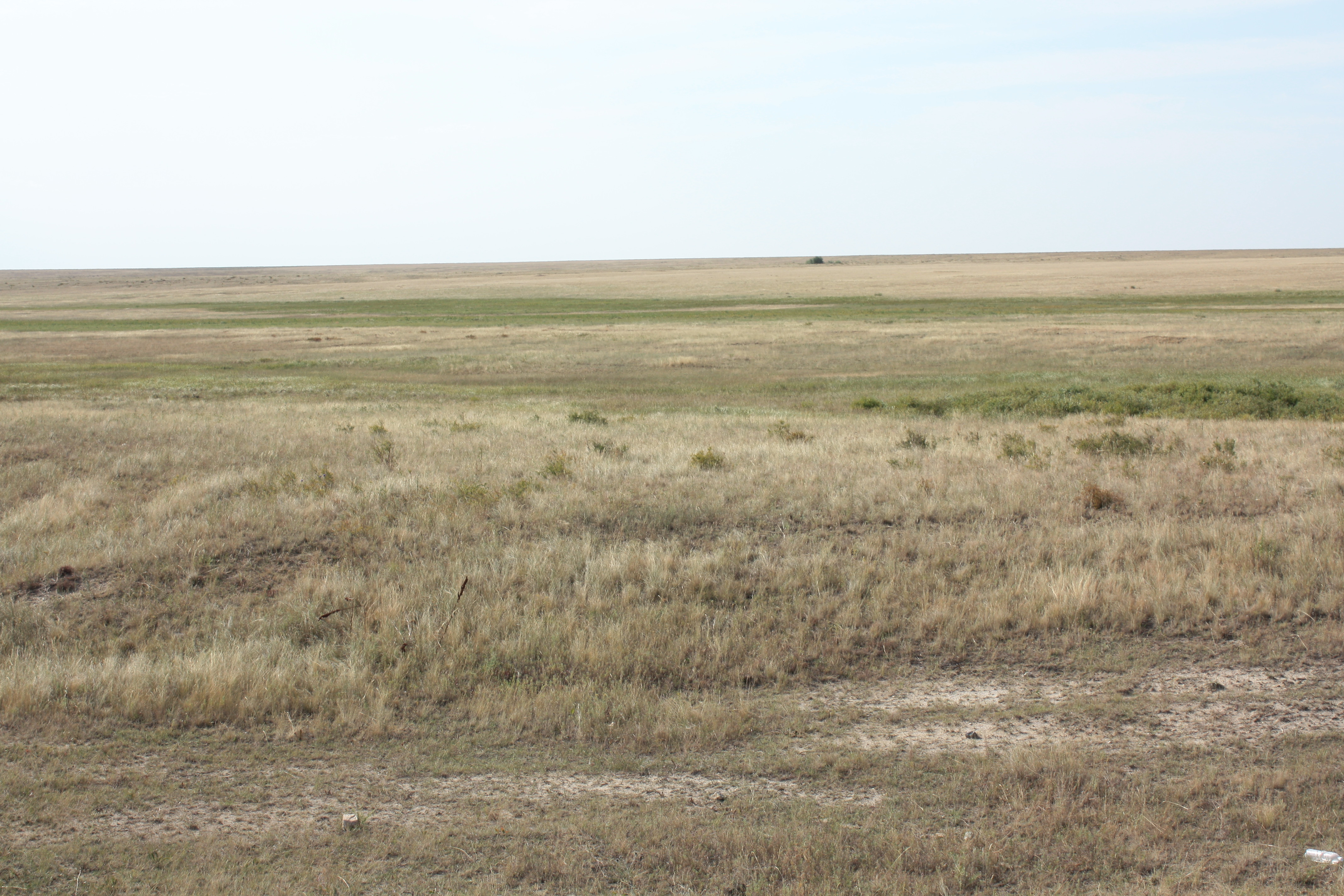
- Steppe landscape in Yasnensky District

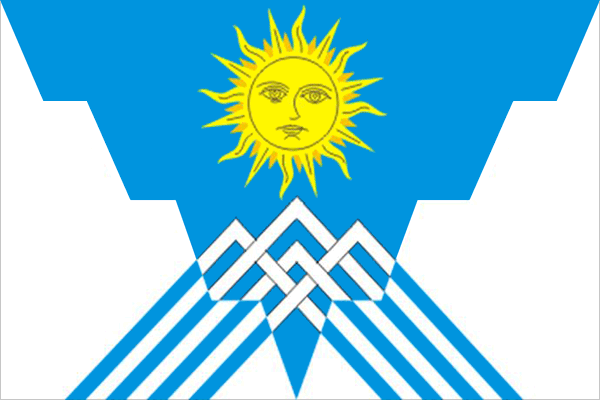
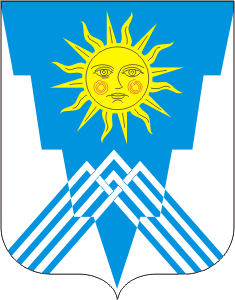
- Flag Coat of arms
- Location of Yasnensky District in Orenburg Oblast
- Coordinates: 51°02′N 59°52′E
- Country: Russia
- Federal subject: Orenburg Oblast
- Administrative center: Yasny

Area
  - Total: 3,500 km^{2} (1,400 sq mi)

Population (2010 Census)
  - Total: 5,043
  - Density: 1.4/km^{2} (3.7/sq mi)
  - Urban: 0%
  - Rural: 100%

Administrative structure
  - Administrative divisions: 6 Selsoviets
  - Inhabited localities: 17 rural localities

Municipal structure
  - Municipally incorporated as: Yasnensky Urban Okrug
- Time zone: UTC+5 (MSK+2)
- OKTMO ID: 53732000
- Website: http://amoyr.ru

Yasnensky District (Russian: Я́сненский райо́н; Kazakh: Ясный ауданы, Iasnyi audany) is an administrative district (raion), one of the thirty-five in Orenburg Oblast, Russia. It is located in the southeast of the oblast. The area of the district is 3,500 square kilometers (1,400 sq mi). Its administrative center is the town of Yasny (which is not administratively a part of the district). Population: 5,043 (2010 Census); 7,440 (2002 census); 7,867 (1989 Soviet census).

== Administrative and municipal status ==
Within the framework of administrative divisions, Yasnensky District is one of the thirty-five in the oblast. The town of Yasny serves as its administrative center, despite being incorporated separately as an administrative unit with the status equal to that of the districts.

As a municipal division, the territory of the district and the territory of the Town of Yasny are incorporated together as Yasnensky Urban Okrug. Prior to May 1, 2015, the district was incorporated as Yasnensky Municipal District, with the Town of Yasny being incorporated within it as Yasny Urban Settlement.
