= Buguruslan =

Town in Orenburg Oblast, Russia

Buguruslan Бугуруслан
- administrative center
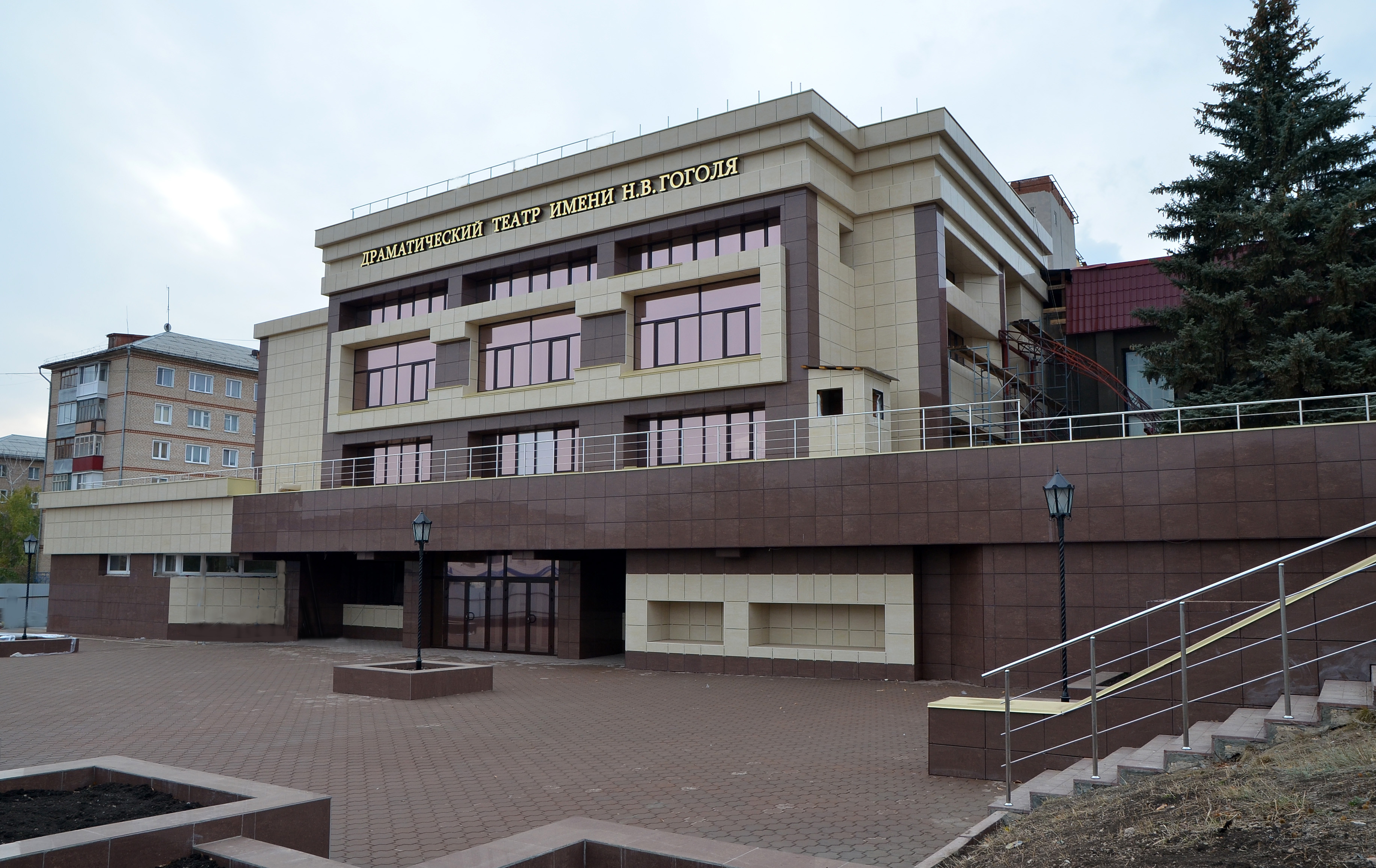
- Drama theatre in the city

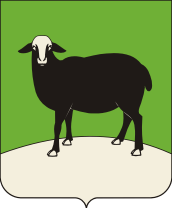
- Coat of arms
- Interactive map of Buguruslan
- Location of Buguruslan Buguruslan (Orenburg Oblast)
- Coordinates: 53°39′30″N 52°26′09″E
- Country: Russia
- Federal subject: Orenburg Oblast
- Founded: 1748
- Elevation: 80 m (260 ft)

Population
  - Estimate (2025): 41,792 )
  - Rank: 321st in 2010

Administrative status
  - Subordinated to: Town of Buguruslan
  - Capital of: Buguruslansky District, Town of Buguruslan

Municipal status
  - Urban okrug: Buguruslan Urban Okrug
  - Capital of: Buguruslan Urban Okrug, Buguruslansky Municipal District
- Time zone: UTC+5 (MSK+2)
- Postal code: 461630
- Dialing code: +7 35352
- OKTMO ID: 53708000001
- Website: bugadmin.orb.ru

Buguruslan (Russian: Бугурусла́н) is a town in Orenburg Oblast, Russia. Population: 53,893 (2002 census); 54,097 (1989 Soviet census).

== History ==
It was founded at the end of 1748 as a settlement (Buguruslanskaya settlement) by Russian peasants and artisans who migrated to the Volga region, on the ancestral lands of the Bashkirs of the Kipchak parish of Nogai Daruga on the right bank of the Bolshoy Kinel River at the confluence of the Turkhanka River.

In 1781, Sloboda received the status of the county town of Buguruslan, becoming the center of Buguruslan county as part of the Ufa region of the Ufa governorate.

== Administrative and municipal status ==
Within the framework of administrative divisions, Buguruslan serves as the administrative center of Buguruslansky District, even though it is not a part of it. As an administrative division, it is, together with six rural localities, incorporated separately as the Town of Buguruslan—an administrative unit with the status equal to that of the districts. As a municipal division, the Town of Buguruslan is incorporated as Buguruslan Urban Okrug.

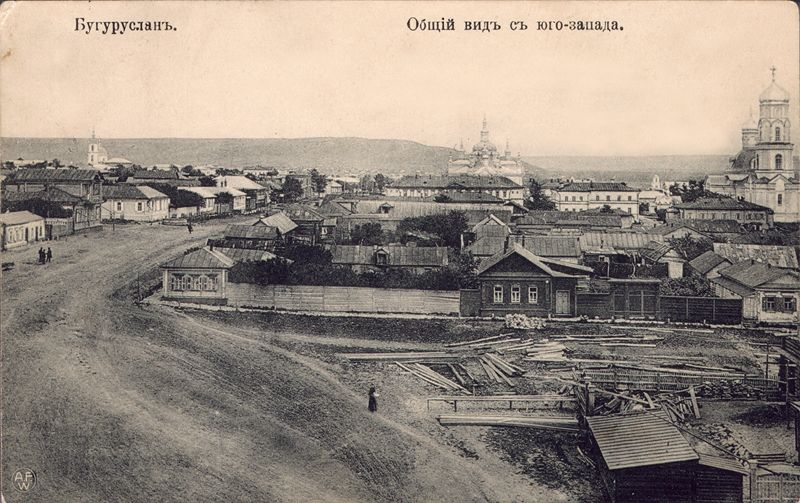
Buguruslan in the beginning of the 20th century

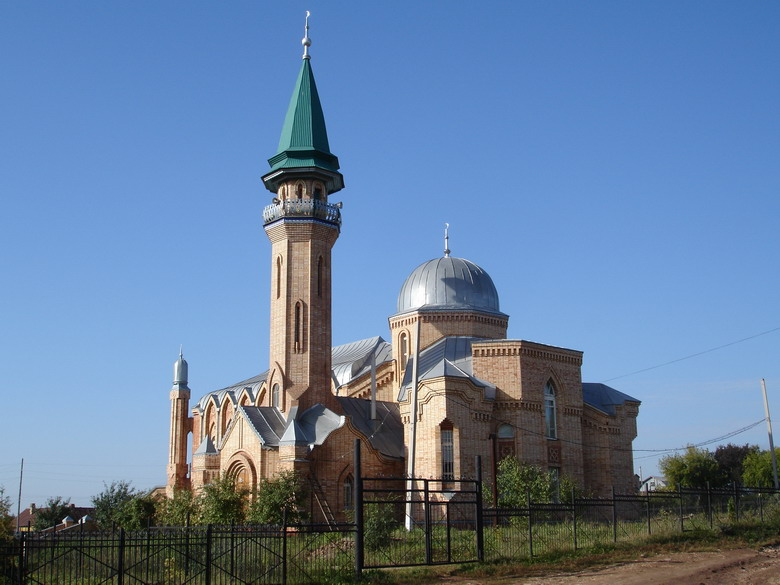
Buguruslan mosque
