= Sol-Iletsky District =

Sol-Iletsky District Соль-Илецкий район (Russian)
- District
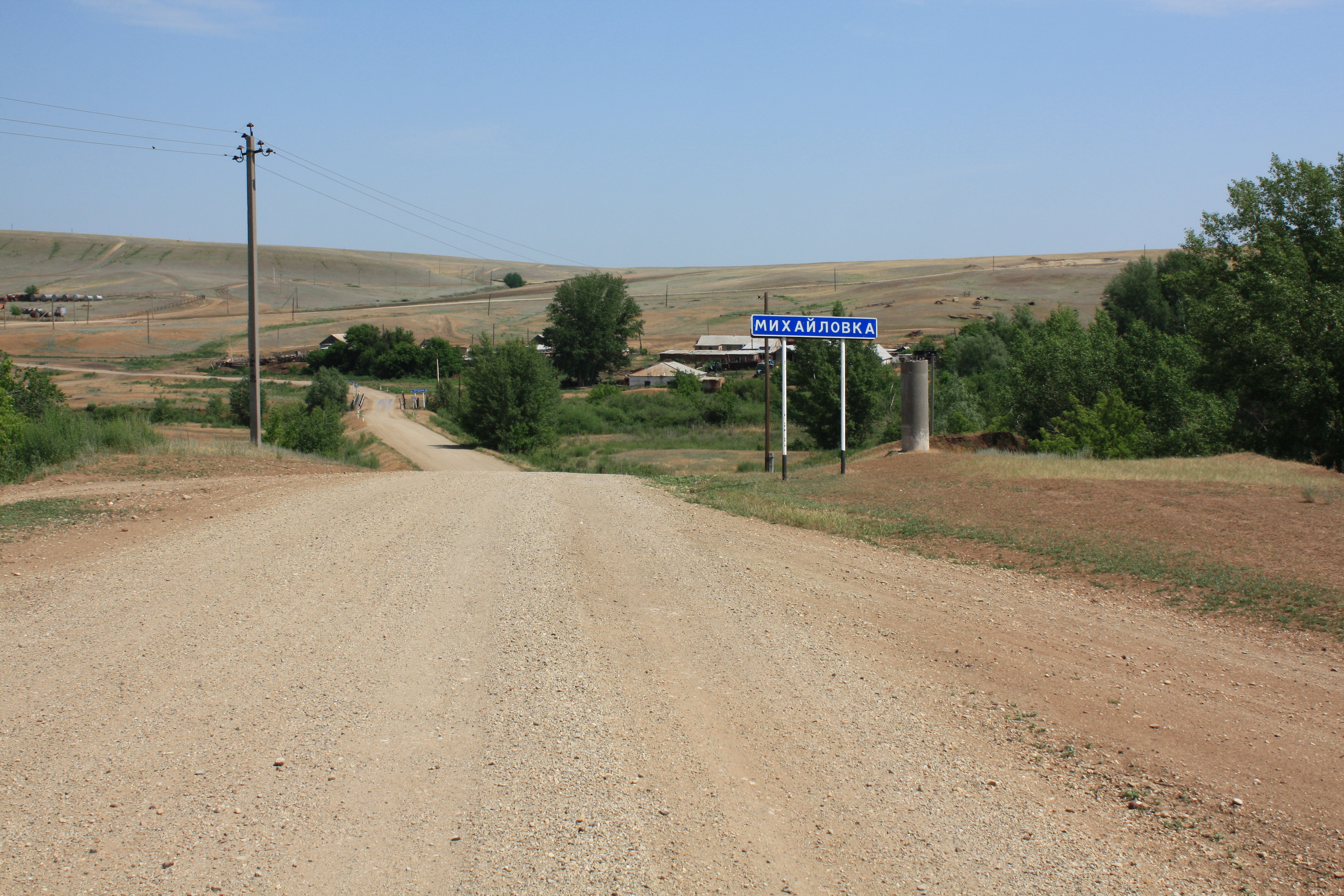
- Entry into Mikhailovka, Sol-Iletsky District

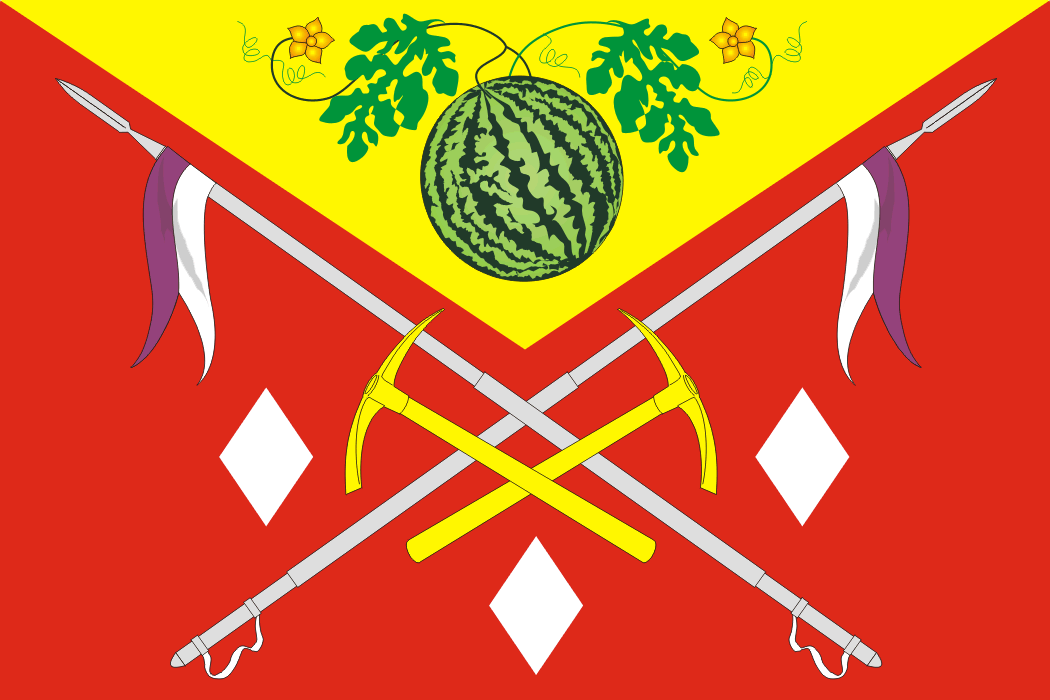
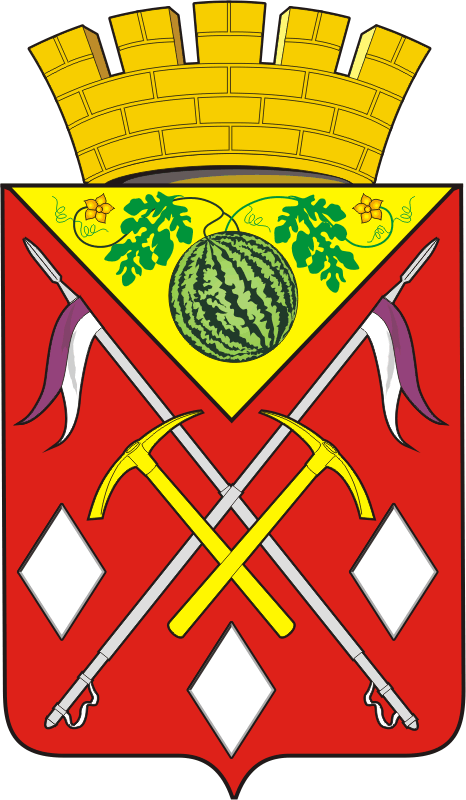
- Flag Coat of arms
- Location of Sol-Iletsky District in Orenburg Oblast
- Coordinates: 51°10′N 54°59′E
- Country: Russia
- Federal subject: Orenburg Oblast
- Administrative center: Sol-Iletsk

Area
  - Total: 5,100 km^{2} (2,000 sq mi)

Population (2010 Census)
  - Total: 25,424
  - Density: 5.0/km^{2} (13/sq mi)
  - Urban: 0%
  - Rural: 100%

Administrative structure
  - Administrative divisions: 21 Selsoviets
  - Inhabited localities: 58 rural localities

Municipal structure
  - Municipally incorporated as: Sol-Iletsky Urban Okrug
- Time zone: UTC+5 (MSK+2)
- OKTMO ID: 53725000
- Website: http://www.soliletsk.ru

Sol-Iletsky District (Russian: Соль-Илецкий райо́н; Kazakh: Тұзтөбе ауданы, Tuztóbe aýdany) is an administrative district (raion), one of the thirty-five in Orenburg Oblast, Russia. It is located in the south of the oblast. The area of the district is 5,100 square kilometers (2,000 sq mi). Its administrative center is the town of Sol-Iletsk, (which is not administratively a part of the district). Population: 25,424 (2010 Census); 28,425 (2002 census); 52,939 (1989 Soviet census).

== Administrative and municipal status ==
Within the framework of administrative divisions, Sol-Iletsky District is one of the thirty-five in the oblast. The town of Sol-Iletsk serves as its administrative center, despite being incorporated separately as an administrative unit with the status equal to that of the districts.

As a municipal division, the territory of the district and the territory of the Town of Sol-Iletsk are incorporated together as Sol-Iletsky Urban Okrug. Prior to May 1, 2015, the district was incorporated as Sol-Iletsky Municipal District, with the Town of Sol-Iletsk being incorporated within it as Sol-Iletsk Urban Settlement.

== Paleontology ==
Fossils of dipnoan fish Ceratodus bucobaensis were found in the Middle Triassic Bukobay V locality of Sol-Iletsky District. The species is characterized by large, elegant tooth plates up to 50 mm long.
