= Sorochinsky District =

Sorochinsky District Сорочинский район (Russian)
- District
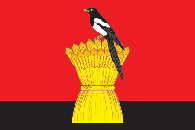
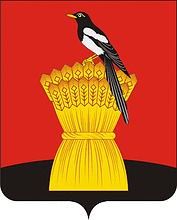
- Flag Coat of arms
- Location of Sorochinsky District in Orenburg Oblast
- Coordinates: 52°26′N 53°09′E
- Country: Russia
- Federal subject: Orenburg Oblast
- Established: 16 July 1928
- Administrative center: Sorochinsk

Area
  - Total: 2,800 km^{2} (1,100 sq mi)

Population (2010 Census)
  - Total: 14,192
  - Density: 5.1/km^{2} (13/sq mi)
  - Urban: 0%
  - Rural: 100%

Administrative structure
  - Administrative divisions: 15 Selsoviets
  - Inhabited localities: 40 rural localities

Municipal structure
  - Municipally incorporated as: Sorochinsky Urban Okrug
- Website: http://mo-sr.orb.ru/

Population of Sorochinsky District
- 2010 Census: 14,192
- 2002 Census: 16,742
- 1989 Census: 16,008
- 1979 Census: 18,305

Sorochinsky District (Russian: Сорочинский райо́н) is an administrative district (raion), one of the thirty-five in Orenburg Oblast, Russia. It is located in the west of the oblast. The area of the district is 2,800 square kilometers (1,100 sq mi). Its administrative center is the town of Sorochinsk (which is not administratively a part of the district). As of the 2010 Census, the total population of the district was 14,192.

== Administrative and municipal status ==
Within the framework of administrative divisions, Sorochinsky District is one of the thirty-five in the oblast. The town of Sorochinsk serves as its administrative center, despite being incorporated separately as an administrative unit with the status equal to that of the districts.

As a municipal division, the territory of the district and the territory of the Town of Sorochinsk are incorporated together as Sorochinsky Urban Okrug. Prior to June 1, 2015, the district was incorporated as Sorochinsky Municipal District, while the Town of Sorochinsk was incorporated separately as Sorochinsk Urban Okrug.
