= Sorochinsk =

Town in Orenburg Oblast, Russia

Sorochinsk Сорочинск
- Town
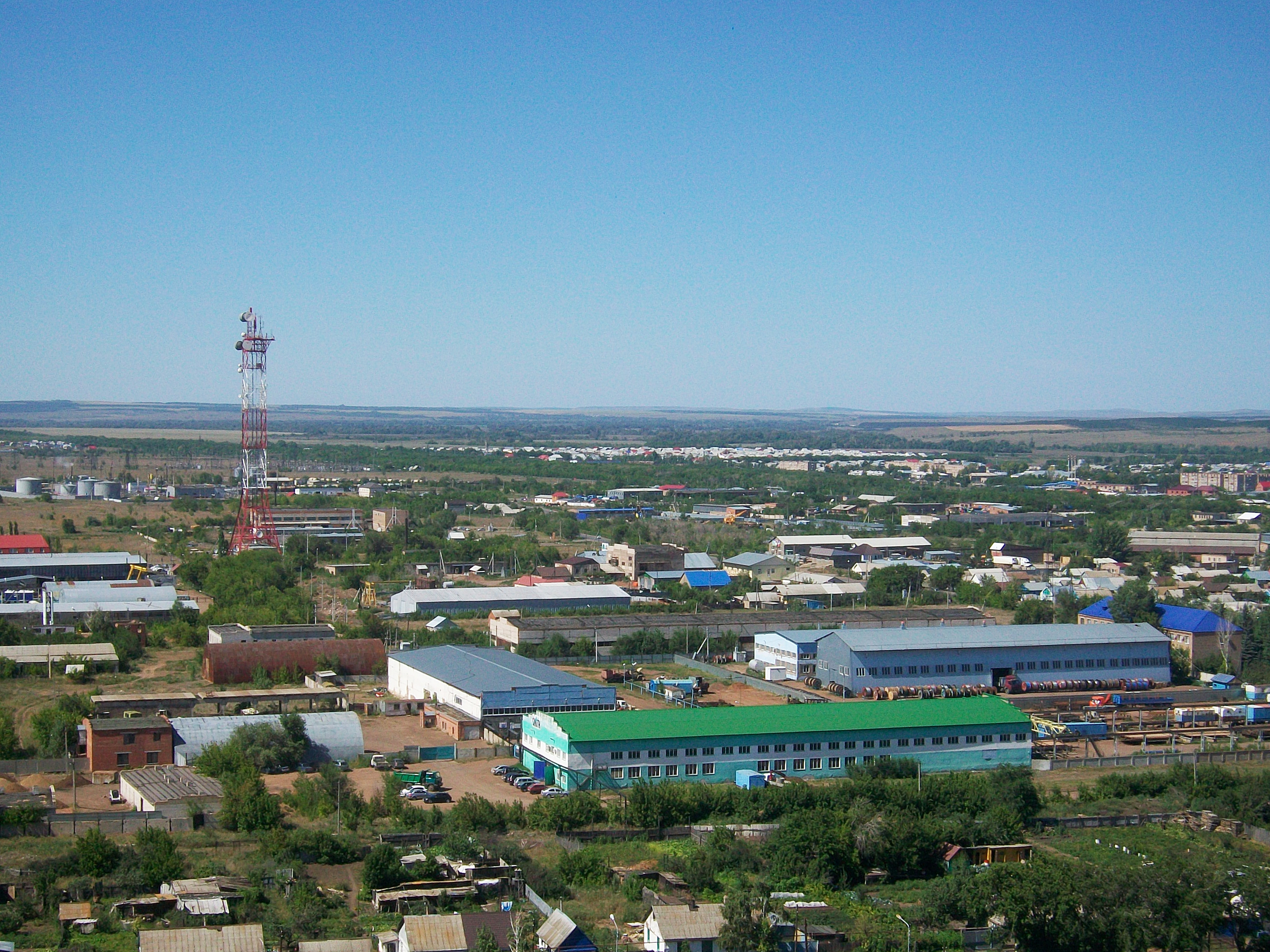
- View of Sorochinsk

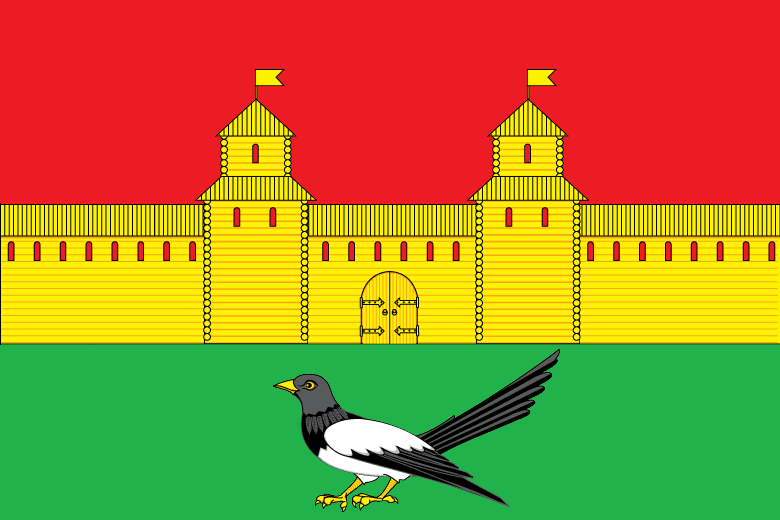
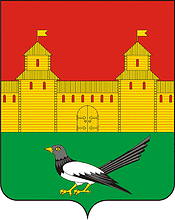
- Flag Coat of arms
- Interactive map of Sorochinsk
- Location of Sorochinsk Sorochinsk (Orenburg Oblast)
- Coordinates: 52°25′N 53°06′E
- Country: Russia
- Federal subject: Orenburg Oblast
- Founded: 1737
- Town status since: 1945
- Elevation: 100 m (330 ft)

Population (2010 Census)
  - Total: 29,249
  - Estimate (2021): 28,478 (−2.6%)

Administrative status
  - Subordinated to: Town of Sorochinsk
  - Capital of: Sorochinsky District, Town of Sorochinsk

Municipal status
  - Urban okrug: Sorochinsky Urban Okrug
  - Capital of: Sorochinsky Urban Okrug
- Time zone: UTC+5 (MSK+2)
- OKTMO ID: 53727000001
- Website: sorochinsk56.ru

Sorochinsk population
- 2010 Census: 29,249
- 2002 Census: 30,136
- 1989 Census: 26,721
- 1979 Census: 24,739

Sorochinsk (Russian: Соро́чинск) is a town in Orenburg Oblast, Russia, located on the Samara River (Volga's tributary), 170 kilometers (110 mi) northwest of Orenburg, the administrative center of the oblast. As of the 2010 Census, its population was 29,249.

== History ==
It was founded in 1737 as the fortress of Sorochinskaya (Сорочинская). It had been known as the village of Sorochinskoye (Сорочинское) since the 19th century. It was granted town status and renamed Sorochinsk in 1945.

== Administrative and municipal status ==
Within the framework of administrative divisions, Sorochinsk serves as the administrative center of Sorochinsky District, even though it is not a part of it. As an administrative division, it is incorporated separately as the Town of Sorochinsk—an administrative unit with the status equal to that of the districts. As a municipal division, the territories of the Town of Sorochinsk and of Sorochinsky District are incorporated as Sorochinsky Urban Okrug. Prior to June 1, 2015, the Town of Sorochinsk was incorporated as Sorochinsk Urban Okrug, separately from Sorochinsky Municipal District.

== Geography ==
=== Climate ===
Climate data for Sorochinsk (extremes 1934–present)
Month	Jan	Feb	Mar	Apr	May	Jun	Jul	Aug	Sep	Oct	Nov	Dec	Year
Record high °C (°F)	3.5 (38.3)	4.4 (39.9)	18.5 (65.3)	30.0 (86.0)	36.3 (97.3)	38.9 (102.0)	40.8 (105.4)	40.0 (104.0)	36.4 (97.5)	25.7 (78.3)	15.7 (60.3)	6.7 (44.1)	40.8 (105.4)
Mean daily maximum °C (°F)	−7.7 (18.1)	−6.9 (19.6)	−0.3 (31.5)	12.6 (54.7)	22.1 (71.8)	26.4 (79.5)	28.4 (83.1)	26.9 (80.4)	20.0 (68.0)	10.8 (51.4)	0.5 (32.9)	−6.1 (21.0)	10.6 (51.0)
Daily mean °C (°F)	−11.3 (11.7)	−11.0 (12.2)	−4.4 (24.1)	7.0 (44.6)	15.4 (59.7)	20.0 (68.0)	21.9 (71.4)	20.1 (68.2)	13.6 (56.5)	6.0 (42.8)	−2.6 (27.3)	−9.3 (15.3)	5.5 (41.8)
Mean daily minimum °C (°F)	−14.7 (5.5)	−14.7 (5.5)	−8.2 (17.2)	1.9 (35.4)	9.1 (48.4)	13.7 (56.7)	15.5 (59.9)	13.9 (57.0)	8.1 (46.6)	2.1 (35.8)	−5.2 (22.6)	−12.4 (9.7)	0.8 (33.4)
Record low °C (°F)	−40.8 (−41.4)	−39.0 (−38.2)	−32.2 (−26.0)	−23.6 (−10.5)	−6.3 (20.7)	−1.0 (30.2)	5.1 (41.2)	−0.3 (31.5)	−6.4 (20.5)	−18.0 (−0.4)	−30.7 (−23.3)	−37.5 (−35.5)	−40.8 (−41.4)
Average precipitation mm (inches)	28.9 (1.14)	22.1 (0.87)	28.4 (1.12)	27.8 (1.09)	35.2 (1.39)	49.5 (1.95)	37.2 (1.46)	35.6 (1.40)	31.1 (1.22)	34.5 (1.36)	31.6 (1.24)	29.6 (1.17)	391.5 (15.41)
Source: pogoda.ru.net
