= Buguruslansky District =

Buguruslansky District Бугурусланский район
- District
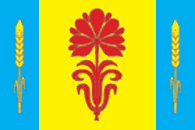
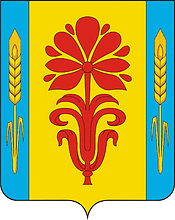
- Flag Coat of arms
- Location of Buguruslansky District in Orenburg Oblast
- Coordinates: 53°37′N 52°25′E
- Country: Russia
- Federal subject: Orenburg Oblast
- Established: 16 July 1928
- Administrative center: Buguruslan

Area
  - Total: 2,834 km^{2} (1,094 sq mi)

Population (2010 Census)
  - Total: 19,680
  - Density: 6.944/km^{2} (17.99/sq mi)
  - Urban: 0%
  - Rural: 100%

Administrative structure
  - Administrative divisions: 15 Selsoviets
  - Inhabited localities: 80 rural localities

Municipal structure
  - Municipally incorporated as: Buguruslansky Municipal District
  - Municipal divisions: 0 urban settlements, 14 rural settlements
- Time zone: UTC+5 (MSK+2)
- OKTMO ID: 53611000
- Website: http://bugr.orb.ru/

Buguruslansky District (Russian: Бугурусла́нский райо́н) is an administrative and municipal district (raion), one of the thirty-five in Orenburg Oblast, Russia. It is located in the northwest of the oblast. The area of the district is 2,834 square kilometers (1,094 sq mi). Its administrative center is the town of Buguruslan (which is not administratively a part of the district). Population: 19,680 (2010 Census); 23,523 (2002 Census); 23,172 (1989 Soviet census).

== Administrative and municipal status ==
Within the framework of administrative divisions, Buguruslansky District is one of the thirty-five in the oblast. The town of Buguruslan serves as its administrative center, despite being incorporated separately as an administrative unit with the status equal to that of the districts.

As a municipal division, the district is incorporated as Buguruslansky Municipal District. The Town of Buguruslan is incorporated separately from the district as Buguruslan Urban Okrug.
