= Orenburgsky District =

Orenburgsky District Оренбургский район (Russian)
- District
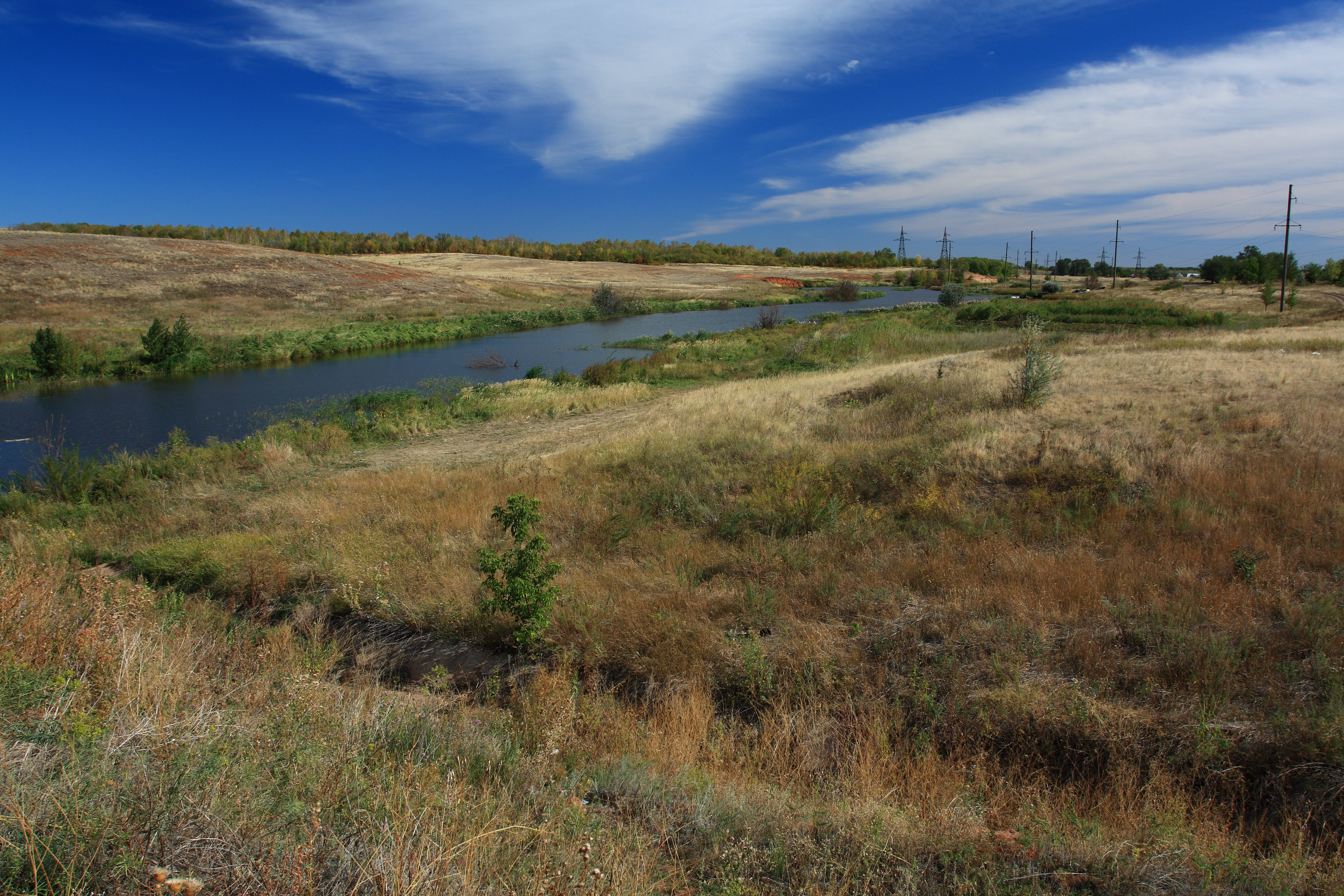
- Chornaya ("Black") River, Orenburgsky District

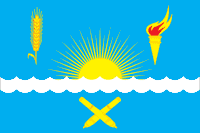
- Flag Coat of arms
- Location of Orenburgsky District in Orenburg Oblast
- Coordinates: 53°42′N 53°39′E
- Country: Russia
- Federal subject: Orenburg Oblast
- Established: 1938
- Administrative center: Orenburg

Area
  - Total: 5,500 km^{2} (2,100 sq mi)

Population (2010 Census)
  - Total: 74,404
  - Density: 14/km^{2} (35/sq mi)
  - Urban: 0%
  - Rural: 100%

Administrative structure
  - Administrative divisions: 30 selsoviet, 1 settlement council
  - Inhabited localities: 68 rural localities

Municipal structure
  - Municipally incorporated as: Orenburgsky Municipal District
  - Municipal divisions: 0 urban settlements, 31 rural settlements
- Time zone: UTC+5 (MSK+2)
- OKTMO ID: 53634000
- Website: http://www.orenregion.ru/

Orenburgsky District (Russian: Оренбу́ргский райо́н) is an administrative and municipal district (raion), one of the thirty-five in Orenburg Oblast, Russia. It is located in the center of the oblast. The area of the district is 5,500 square kilometers (2,100 sq mi). Its administrative center is the city of Orenburg (which is not administratively a part of the district). Population: 74,404 (2010 Census); 65,130 (2002 census); 58,882 (1989 Soviet census).

== Administrative and municipal status ==
Within the framework of administrative divisions, Orenburgsky District is one of the thirty-five in the oblast. The city of Orenburg serves as its administrative center, despite being incorporated separately as an administrative unit with the status equal to that of the districts.

As a municipal division, the district is incorporated as Orenburgsky Municipal District. The City of Orenburg is incorporated separately from the district as Orenburg Urban Okrug.
