= Abdulino =

Town in Orenburg Oblast, Russia

Abdulino Абдулино
- Town
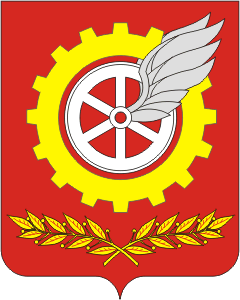
- Flag Coat of arms
- Interactive map of Abdulino
- Location of Abdulino Abdulino (Orenburg Oblast)
- Coordinates: 53°40′N 53°38′E
- Country: Russia
- Federal subject: Orenburg Oblast
- Founded: 1795 (Julian)
- Elevation: 190 m (620 ft)

Population (2010 Census)
  - Total: 20,173
  - Estimate (2021): 17,274 (−14.4%)

Administrative status
  - Subordinated to: Town of Abdulino
  - Capital of: Abdulinsky District, Town of Abdulino

Municipal status
  - Urban okrug: Abdulinsky Urban Okrug
  - Capital of: Abdulinsky Urban Okrug
- Time zone: UTC+5 (MSK+2)
- Postal codes: 461740, 461742–461744
- OKTMO ID: 53704000001

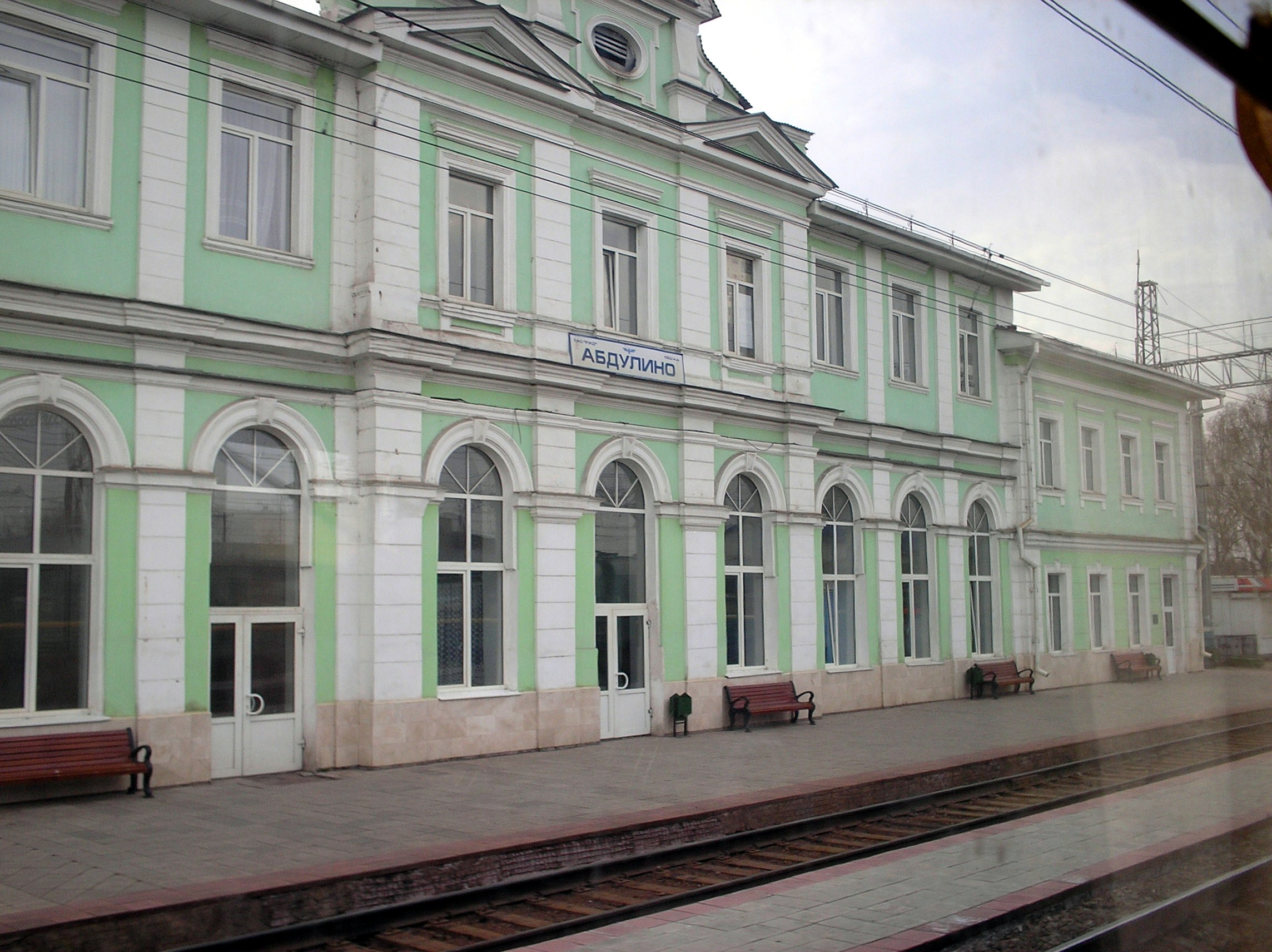
Abdulino railway station

Abdulino population
- 2010 Census: 20,173
- 2002 Census: 21,537
- 1989 Census: 22,639
- 1979 Census: 23,054

Abdulino (Russian: Абду́лино) is a town in Orenburg Oblast, Russia. As of the 2010 Census, its population was 20,173.

== Administrative and municipal status ==
Within the framework of administrative divisions, Abdulino serves as the administrative center of Abdulinsky District, even though it is not a part of it. As an administrative division, it is incorporated separately as the Town of Abdulino—an administrative unit with the status equal to that of the districts. As a municipal division, the territories of the Town of Abdulino and of Abdulinsky District are incorporated as Abdulinsky Urban Okrug.
