= Raduzhny, Vladimir Oblast =

Closed town in Vladimir Oblast, Russia

Raduzhny Радужный
- Town
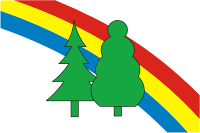
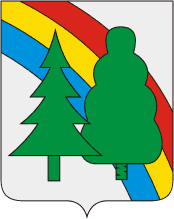
- Flag Coat of arms
- Interactive map of Raduzhny
- Location of Raduzhny Raduzhny (Vladimir Oblast)
- Coordinates: 56°00′N 40°20′E
- Country: Russia
- Federal subject: Vladimir Oblast
- Founded: 1971
- Town status since: 1991
- Elevation: 160 m (520 ft)

Population (2010 Census)
  - Total: 18,211
  - Estimate (2021): 17,569 (−3.5%)

Administrative status
  - Subordinated to: closed administrative-territorial formation of Raduzhny
  - Capital of: closed administrative-territorial formation of Raduzhny

Municipal status
  - Urban okrug: Raduzhny Urban Okrug
  - Capital of: Raduzhny Urban Okrug
- Time zone: UTC+3 (MSK)
- Postal code: 600910
- OKTMO ID: 17737000001

Raduzhny (Russian: Ра́дужный) is a closed town in Vladimir Oblast, Russia, located on the Pol, Buzha, and Uzhbol Rivers, 12 kilometers (7.5 mi) south of Vladimir. Population: 17,569 (2021 census); 18,211 (2010 census); 17,506 (2002 census).

== History ==
It was established in 1971 as a settlement for the workers of a defense industry design bureau. In 1977, it was granted work settlement status and named Vladimir-30 (Влади́мир-30). In 1991, it was granted town status and renamed Raduzhny.

== Administrative and municipal status ==
Within the framework of administrative divisions, it is incorporated as the closed administrative-territorial formation of Raduzhny—an administrative unit with the status equal to that of the districts. As a municipal division, the closed administrative-territorial formation of Raduzhny is incorporated as Raduzhny Urban Okrug.
