= Abdulinsky District =

Abdulinsky District Абдулинский район (Russian)
- District
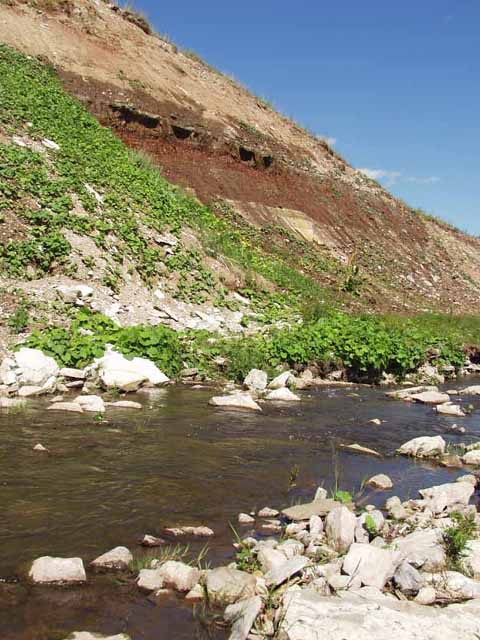
- Spring steeps protected area in Abdulinsky District

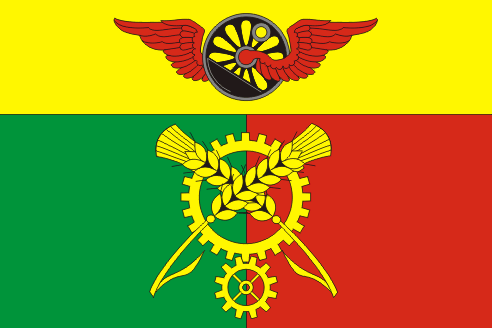
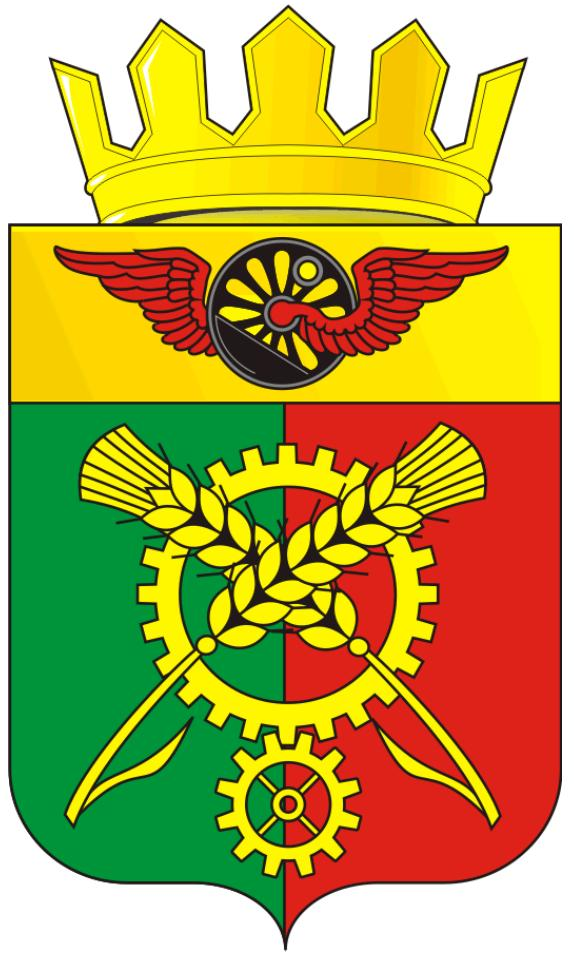
- Flag Coat of arms
- Location of Abdulinsky District in Orenburg Oblast
- Coordinates: 53°42′N 53°39′E
- Country: Russia
- Federal subject: Orenburg Oblast
- Established: 16 July 1928
- Administrative center: Abdulino

Area
  - Total: 1,700 km^{2} (660 sq mi)

Population (2010 Census)
  - Total: 10,373
  - Density: 6.1/km^{2} (16/sq mi)
  - Urban: 0%
  - Rural: 100%

Administrative structure
  - Administrative divisions: 14 Selsoviets
  - Inhabited localities: 48 rural localities

Municipal structure
  - Municipally incorporated as: Abdulinsky Urban Okrug
- Website: http://www.ab.orb.ru

Population of Abdulinsky District
- 2010 Census: 10,373
- 2002 Census: 14,485
- 1989 Census: 17,123
- 1979 Census: 23,535

Abdulinsky District (Russian: Абду́линский райо́н) is an administrative district (raion), one of the thirty-five in Orenburg Oblast, Russia. It is located in the northwest of the oblast. The area of the district is 1,700 square kilometers (660 sq mi). Its administrative center is the town of Abdulino (which is not administratively a part of the district). As of the 2010 Census, the total population of the district was 10,373.

== Administrative and municipal status ==
Within the framework of administrative divisions, Abdulinsky District is one of the thirty-five in the oblast. The town of Abdulino serves as its administrative center, despite being incorporated separately as an administrative unit with the status equal to that of the districts.

As a municipal division, the territory of the district and the territory of the Town of Abdulino are incorporated together as Abdulinsky Urban Okrug. Prior to July 10, 2015, the district was incorporated as Abdulinsky Municipal District, with the Town of Abdulino being incorporated within it as Abdulino Urban Settlement.
