= 2022 Vladimir Oblast gubernatorial election =

← 2018	9–11 September 2022	2027 →
- Turnout: 29.04%
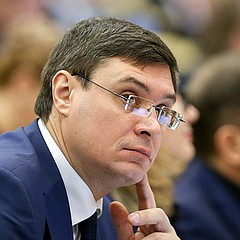
		CPRF
Nominee	Aleksandr Avdeyev	Anton Sidorko
Party	United Russia	CPRF
Popular vote	265,125	20,682
Percentage	83.68%	6.53%
Governor before election
Aleksandr Avdeyev (acting)
United Russia
Elected Governor
Aleksandr Avdeyev
United Russia

The 2022 Vladimir Oblast gubernatorial election took place on 9–11 September 2022, on common election day. Acting Governor Aleksandr Avdeyev was elected to a full term.

== Background ==
Vladimir Sipyagin was unexpectedly elected Governor of Vladimir Oblast in September 2018, defeating one-term incumbent Svetlana Orlova by a margin of nearly 20 points in the run-off. Sipyagin became the first LDPR governor in Vladimir Oblast's history. Due to Sipyagin's surprising win, he was considered a "fluke winner", his term as governor was marked by poor governance and constant attacks from other political forces. Naturally, rumours were spread about Sigyagin's early resignation. In February 2021, Sipyagin was named a potential candidate for State Duma seat of Aleksandr Kurdyumov, who was appointed to the Central Electoral Commission, however, the vacant seat was awarded to Yakutia politician Gavril Parakhin. However, Sipyagin was placed in LDPR's party list for the upcoming State Duma election, placing No. 5 in the federal list. On 19 September 2021, Sipyagin was elected to the State Duma, and on 29 September he announced his resignation as Governor of Vladimir Oblast. Several candidates were rumoured as his replacement, including State Duma member from Kaluga Aleksandr Avdeyev, Deputy Minister of Labour Olga Batalina, Gazprom Mezhregiongaz general director Sergey Gustov, and Rosseti Centre general director Igor Makovsky. On 4 October, Avdeyev was appointed acting Governor of Vladimir Oblast.

Due to the start of the Russian invasion of Ukraine in February 2022 and subsequent economic sanctions, the cancellation and postponement of direct gubernatorial elections was proposed. The measure was even supported by A Just Russia leader Sergey Mironov. Eventually, on 9 June the Legislative Assembly of Vladimir Oblast called the gubernatorial election for 11 September 2022.

== Candidates ==
Only political parties can nominate candidates for gubernatorial election in Vladimir Oblast, self-nomination is not possible. However, candidates are not obliged to be members of the nominating party. Candidate for Governor of Vladimir Oblast should be a Russian citizen and at least 30 years old. Each candidate in order to be registered is required to collect at least 8% of signatures of members and heads of municipalities (126 signatures). Also, gubernatorial candidates present three candidacies to the Federation Council and election winner later appoints one of the presented candidates.

=== Registered ===
- Aleksandr Avdeyev (United Russia), acting Governor of Vladimir Oblast, former Member of State Duma (2016–2021)
- Sergey Biryukov (SR-ZP), Member of Legislative Assembly of Vladimir Oblast, 2018 gubernatorial candidate
- Sergey Kornishov (LDPR), Member of Legislative Assembly of Vladimir Oblast
- Anton Sidorko (CPRF), Deputy Chairman of Legislative Assembly of Vladimir Oblast
- Aleksandr Subbotin (Party of Growth), construction businessman, former Vladimir Oblast Commissioner for Entrepreneur's Rights (2012-2013)

=== Eliminated at convention ===
- Dmitry Rozhkov (United Russia), Deputy Chairman of Legislative Assembly of Vladimir Oblast
- Aleksey Rusakovsky (United Russia), Member of Legislative Assembly of Vladimir Oblast, general director of Vladimir Electric Motor Factory

=== Declined ===
- Vadim Serebrov (CPRF), Member of Legislative Assembly of Vladimir Oblast, teacher
- Larisa Yemelyanova (CPRF), Member of Legislative Assembly of Vladimir Oblast

=== Candidates for Federation Council ===
- Aleksandr Avdeyev (United Russia):
  - Yelena Fomina, Mayor of Kovrov
  - Vladimir Kiselyov, Speaker of Legislative Assembly of Vladimir Oblast
  - Andrey Shokhin, Mayor of Vladimir
- Sergey Biryukov (SR-ZP):
  - Nikolay Amelin, former Member of Legislative Assembly of Vladimir Oblast (2009-2013)
  - Andrey Marinin, Member of Legislative Assembly of Vladimir Oblast, chairman of A Just Russia regional office
  - Natalya Pronina, Member of Legislative Assembly of Vladimir Oblast
- Sergey Kornishov (LDPR):
  - Aleksandr Bugayev, deputy coordinator of LDPR regional office
  - Kirill Minets, Member of Electoral Commission of Vladimir Oblast
  - Aleksandr Pronyushkin, incumbent Senator
- Anton Sidorko (CPRF):
  - Nikolay Povod, director of Grigoryevo middle school
  - Albert Rusanen, former Member of Vladimir Council of People's Deputies
  - Ivan Yakhayev, Member of Gus-Khrustalny Council of People's Deputies, businessman
- Aleksandr Subbotin (Party of Growth):
  - Nikolay Kvashennikov, entrepreneur, former Member of Gorokhovetsky District Council of Deputies (2011-2015)
  - Aleksey Mayorov, attorney
  - Aleksey Panfilov, businessman, activist

== Results ==
Summary of the 9–11 September 2022 Vladimir Oblast gubernatorial election results
Candidate	Party	Votes	%
Aleksandr Avdeyev (incumbent)	United Russia	265,125	83.68
Anton Sidorko	Communist Party	20,682	6.53
Sergey Kornishov	Liberal Democratic Party	10,599	3.35
Sergey Biryukov	A Just Russia — For Truth	7,782	2.46
Aleksandr Subbotin	Party of Growth	6,356	2.01
Valid votes		310,544	98.02
Blank ballots		6,283	1.98
Total		316,827	100.00
Turnout		316,827	29.04
Registered voters		1,090,824	100.00

Vladimir Mayor Andrey Shokhin (United Russia) was appointed to the Federation Council, replacing incumbent Senator Aleksandr Pronyushkin (LDPR).

== See also ==
- 2022 Russian gubernatorial elections
