= 2023 Vladimir Oblast Legislative Assembly election =

2023 Russian election

- 8–10 September 2023
- Turnout: 24.73%
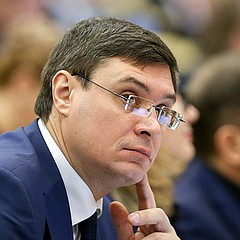

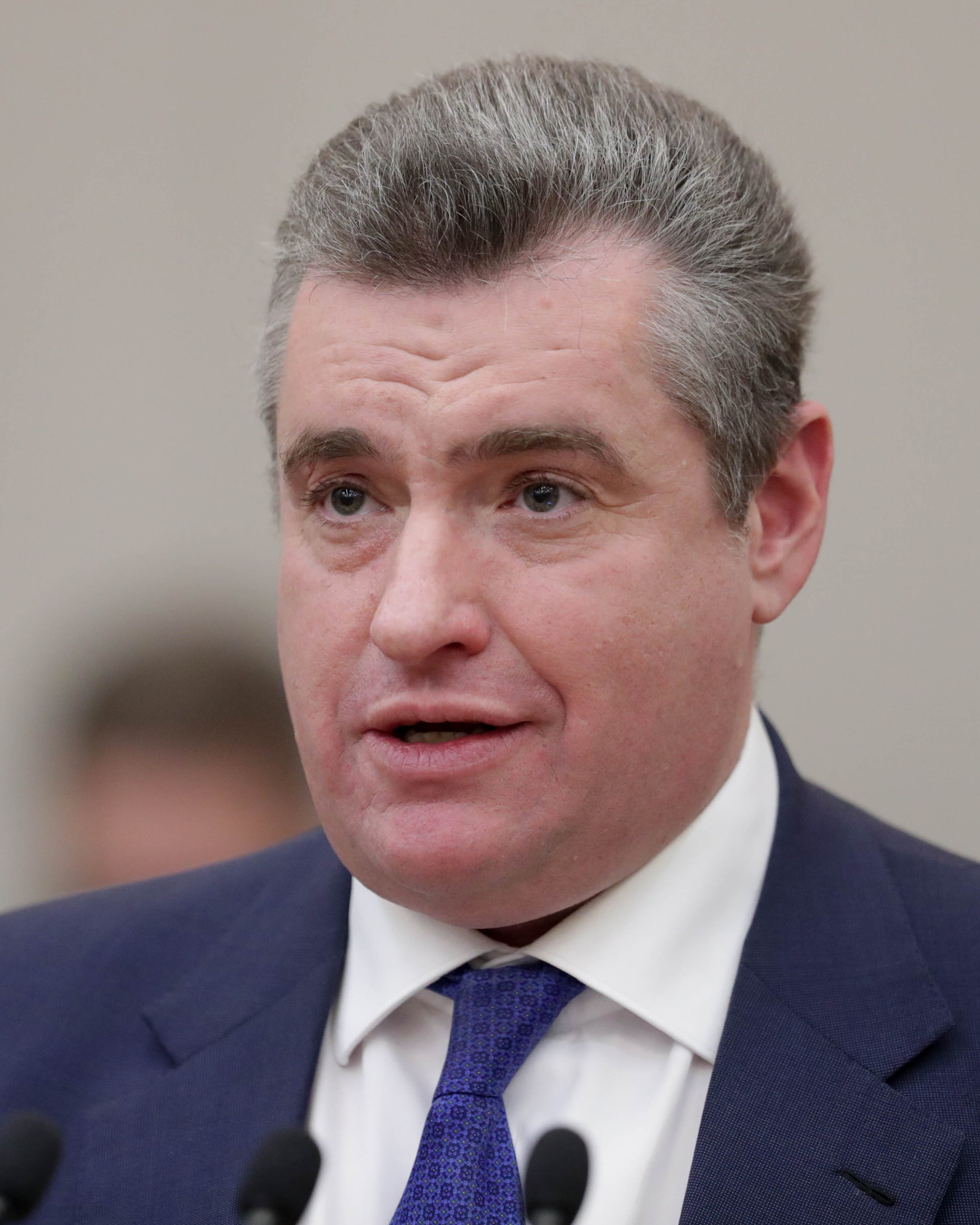
	Majority party	Minority party	Third party
		CPRF
Candidate	Aleksandr Avdeyev	Anton Sidorko	Leonid Slutsky
Leader	Dmitry Medvedev	Gennady Zyuganov	Leonid Slutsky
Party	United Russia	CPRF	LDPR
Last election	23 seats, 29.57%	7 seats, 23.66%	4 seats, 20.80%
Seats won	35	2	1
Seat change	▲12	▼5	▼3
Popular vote	148,634	37,572	27,854
Percentage	55.47%	14.02%	10.39%
Swing	▲25.90%	▼9.64%	▼10.41%
	Fourth party	Fifth party	Sixth party
	SR-ZP	RPPSS	NL
Candidate	Sergey Biryukov	Inna Kartashova	Danil Kotler
Leader	Sergey Mironov	Vladimir Burakov	Aleksey Nechayev
Party	SR-ZP	Party of Pensioners	New People
Last election	3 seats, 10.20%	0 seats, 4.38%	Did not exist
Seats won	1	1	0
Seat change	▼2	▲1	Did not exist
Popular vote	17,778	16,242	12,944
Percentage	6.63%	6.06%	4.83%
Swing	▼3.57%	▲1.68%	Did not exist

The 2023 Legislative Assembly of Vladimir Oblast election took place on 8–10 September 2023, on common election day. All 40 seats in the Legislative Assembly were up for reelection.

== Electoral system ==
Under current election laws, the Legislative Assembly is elected for a term of five years, with parallel voting. 15 seats are elected by party-list proportional representation with a 5% electoral threshold, with the other half elected in 25 single-member constituencies by first-past-the-post voting. Until 2023 the number of mandates allocated in proportional and majoritarian parts were standing at 19 each. Seats in the proportional part are allocated using the Imperiali quota, modified to ensure that every party list, which passes the threshold, receives at least one mandate.

== Candidates ==
=== Party lists ===
To register regional lists of candidates, parties need to collect 0.5% of signatures of all registered voters in Vladimir Oblast.

The following parties were relieved from the necessity to collect signatures:

- United Russia
- Communist Party of the Russian Federation
- A Just Russia — Patriots — For Truth
- Liberal Democratic Party of Russia
- New People
- Russian Party of Freedom and Justice
- Russian Party of Pensioners for Social Justice

№	Party	Oblast-wide list	Candidates	Territorial groups	Status
1	A Just Russia – For Truth	Sergey Biryukov • Andrey Marinin • Natalya Pronina	65	23	Registered
2	Communist Party	Anton Sidorko • Anton Klyuyev • Shamil Khabibullin	65	24	Registered
3	New People	Danil Kotler • Ilya Seregin • Aleksandr Subbotin	65	25	Registered
4	Party of Pensioners	Inna Kartashova • Nina Danekina	36	17	Registered
5	United Russia	Aleksandr Avdeyev • Vladimir Kiselyov • Olga Khokhlova • Yury Fedorov • Yekaterina Merkuryeva	102	25	Registered
6	Liberal Democratic Party	Leonid Slutsky • Sergey Kornishov • Aleksandr Bugayev • Vladimir Rykunov • Vyacheslav Aleksandrov	49	22	Registered
	Communists of Russia	Pavel Altukhov • Sergey Akatov • Ivan Altukhov • Yekaterina Mironova	56	25	Withdrew

New People will take part in Vladimir Oblast legislative election for the first time, while Yabloko and Russian Party of Freedom and Justice (then known as Communist Party of Social Justice and even had its own faction), who participated in the last election, did not file.

=== Single-mandate constituencies ===
25 single-mandate constituencies were formed in Vladimir Oblast, an increase of 6 seats since last redistricting in 2018. To register candidates in single-mandate constituencies need to collect 3% of signatures of registered voters in the constituency.

Number of candidates in single-mandate constituencies
Party	Candidates	
Party	Nominated	Registered
United Russia	25	25
Communist Party	25	22
Liberal Democratic Party	25	23
A Just Russia — For Truth	21	18
Party of Pensioners	7	6
New People	18	13
Communists of Russia	2	2
Yabloko	1	0
Independent	2	0
Total	126	109

== Results ==
=== Results by party lists ===
Summary of the 8–10 September 2023 Legislative Assembly of Vladimir Oblast election results
Party	Party list					Constituency		Total	
Party	Votes	%	±pp	Seats	+/–	Seats	+/–	Seats	+/–
United Russia	148,634	55.47	▲25.90%	10	▲3	25	▲9	35	▲12
Communist Party	37,572	14.02	▼9.64%	2	▼3	0	▼2	2	▼5
Liberal Democratic Party	27,854	10.39	▼10.41%	1	▼3	0	Steady	1	▼3
A Just Russia — For Truth	17,778	6.63	▼3.57%	1	▼1	0	▼1	1	▼2
Party of Pensioners	16,242	6.06	▲1.68%	1	▲1	0	Steady	1	▲1
New People	12,944	4.83	New	0	New	0	New	0	New
Communists of Russia	–	–	–	–	–	0	New	0	New
Invalid ballots	6,947	2.59	▼1.24%	—	—	—	—	—	—
Total	267,971	100.00	—	15	▼4	25	▲6	40	▲2
Turnout	267,971	24.73	▼8.17%	—	—	—	—	—	—
Registered voters	1,083,557	100.00	—	—	—	—	—	—	—

Incumbent Senator Olga Khokhlova (United Russia) was elected Chairwoman of the Legislative Assembly, replacing Vladimir Kiselyov (United Russia), who was appointed to Khokhlova's seat in the Federation Council.

=== Results in single-member constituencies ===
==== District 1 ====
Summary of the 8–10 September 2023 Legislative Assembly of Vladimir Oblast election in District 1
Candidate	Party	Votes	%
Aleksandr Nefedov (incumbent)	United Russia	5,564	55.13%
Natalya Pronina (incumbent)	A Just Russia — For Truth	2,632	26.08%
Sergey Sokolov	Communist Party	780	7.73%
Maksim Koroteyev	Liberal Democratic Party	374	3.71%
Vera Poletayeva	Party of Pensioners	294	2.91%
Anton Zverev	New People	191	1.89%
Total		10,092	100%

==== District 2 ====
Summary of the 8–10 September 2023 Legislative Assembly of Vladimir Oblast election in District 2
Candidate	Party	Votes	%
Oleg Aristarkhov	United Russia	4,903	54.36%
Dmitry Polyansky	Communist Party	2,190	24.24%
Aleksandr Seleznev	Liberal Democratic Party	738	8.17%
Galina Bulanova	A Just Russia — For Truth	490	5.42%
Anton Kriva	Party of Pensioners	318	3.52%
Yevgeny Lapenyuk	New People	127	1.41%
Total		9,036	100%

==== District 3 ====
Summary of the 8–10 September 2023 Legislative Assembly of Vladimir Oblast election in District 3
Candidate	Party	Votes	%
Yevgeny Fedorov	United Russia	5,350	67.78%
Andrey Golovanov	Communist Party	1,573	19.93%
Andrey Usov	Liberal Democratic Party	720	9.12%
Total		7,893	100%

==== District 4 ====
Summary of the 8–10 September 2023 Legislative Assembly of Vladimir Oblast election in District 4
Candidate	Party	Votes	%
Pavel Shatokhin (incumbent)	United Russia	4,345	53.55%
Denis Kimmel	Communist Party	1,361	16.77%
Vladimir Krasilov	Liberal Democratic Party	1,113	13.72%
Yulia Petrunyak	A Just Russia — For Truth	803	9.90%
Total		8,114	100%

==== District 5 ====
Summary of the 8–10 September 2023 Legislative Assembly of Vladimir Oblast election in District 5
Candidate	Party	Votes	%
Aleksandr Dyuzhenkov (incumbent)	United Russia	5,785	55.21%
Svetlana Yudina	Communist Party	1,686	16.09%
Aleksey Koreshkov	Liberal Democratic Party	1,293	12.34%
Andrey Yevstigneyev	New People	755	7.21%
Yelena Yudina	A Just Russia — For Truth	658	6.28%
Total		10,478	100%

==== District 6 ====
Summary of the 8–10 September 2023 Legislative Assembly of Vladimir Oblast election in District 6
Candidate	Party	Votes	%
Dmitry Rozhkov (incumbent)	United Russia	6,184	57.13%
Nikolay Malyshev	Communist Party	2,188	20.21%
Andrey Boykov	Liberal Democratic Party	2,003	18.50%
Total		10,825	100%

==== District 7 ====
Summary of the 8–10 September 2023 Legislative Assembly of Vladimir Oblast election in District 7
Candidate	Party	Votes	%
Aleksey Konyshev	United Russia	6,734	68.71%
Vyacheslav Samsonov	Liberal Democratic Party	1,575	16.07%
Aleksandr Polisadov	Communist Party	1,272	12.98%
Total		9,800	100%

==== District 8 ====
Summary of the 8–10 September 2023 Legislative Assembly of Vladimir Oblast election in District 8
Candidate	Party	Votes	%
Pavel Kutuzov	United Russia	4,998	50.32%
Ivan Rostovtsev	Communist Party	2,528	25.45%
Viktor Repin	Party of Pensioners	669	6.74%
German Sazonov	Liberal Democratic Party	629	6.33%
Vadim Yakovlev	New People	591	5.95%
Denis Sychev	Communists of Russia	254	2.56%
Total		9,932	100%

==== District 9 ====
Summary of the 8–10 September 2023 Legislative Assembly of Vladimir Oblast election in District 9
Candidate	Party	Votes	%
Sergey Telegin	United Russia	6,198	62.54%
Aleksandr Bugayev	Liberal Democratic Party	1,733	17.49%
Viktor Baranov	A Just Russia — For Truth	1,560	15.74%
Total		9,911	100%

==== District 10 ====
Summary of the 8–10 September 2023 Legislative Assembly of Vladimir Oblast election in District 10
Candidate	Party	Votes	%
Aleksey Metelkin	United Russia	5,665	59.92%
Shamil Khabibullin	Communist Party	1,063	11.24%
Sergey Biryukov	A Just Russia — For Truth	899	9.51%
Yelizaveta Rayeva	New People	563	5.96%
Artur Ragimov	Liberal Democratic Party	533	5.64%
Aleksandr Khaleyev	Party of Pensioners	530	5.61%
Total		9,454	100%

==== District 11 ====
Summary of the 8–10 September 2023 Legislative Assembly of Vladimir Oblast election in District 11
Candidate	Party	Votes	%
Yekaterina Plyshevskaya	United Russia	5,659	56.02%
Andrey Marinin	A Just Russia — For Truth	1,454	14.39%
Vladimir Blinkov	Communists of Russia	1,313	13.00%
Ilya Seregin	New People	1,266	12.53%
Total		10,101	100%

==== District 12 ====
Summary of the 8–10 September 2023 Legislative Assembly of Vladimir Oblast election in District 12
Candidate	Party	Votes	%
Aleksandr Tsygansky (incumbent)	United Russia	5,069	55.81%
Albert Rusanen	Communist Party	1,404	15.46%
Vyacheslav Aleksandrov	Liberal Democratic Party	1,233	13.57%
Sergey Rusakov	Party of Pensioners	694	7.64%
Danil Kotler	New People	438	4.82%
Total		9,083	100%

==== District 13 ====
Summary of the 8–10 September 2023 Legislative Assembly of Vladimir Oblast election in District 13
Candidate	Party	Votes	%
Aleksandr Zakharov	United Russia	5,328	62.37%
Yelena Musina	Communist Party	1,308	15.31%
Olga Gotovlenkova	A Just Russia — For Truth	789	9.24%
Olesya Markova	New People	481	5.63%
Anna Timofeyeva	Party of Pensioners	414	4.85%
Total		8,543	100%

==== District 14 ====
Summary of the 8–10 September 2023 Legislative Assembly of Vladimir Oblast election in District 14
Candidate	Party	Votes	%
Sergey Kozlov	United Russia	6,125	61.87%
Igor Prokopenko	Communist Party	2,212	22.35%
Denis Podryadnov	Liberal Democratic Party	1,190	12.02%
Total		9,899	100%

==== District 15 ====
Summary of the 8–10 September 2023 Legislative Assembly of Vladimir Oblast election in District 15
Candidate	Party	Votes	%
Mikhail Maksyukov (incumbent)	United Russia	5,289	66.01%
Mikhail Filippov	A Just Russia — For Truth	1,493	18.63%
Alyona Ivanova	New People	584	7.29%
Aleksey Rulev	Liberal Democratic Party	431	5.38%
Total		8,013	100%

==== District 16 ====
Summary of the 8–10 September 2023 Legislative Assembly of Vladimir Oblast election in District 16
Candidate	Party	Votes	%
Nikolay Balakhin	United Russia	6,663	66.27%
Samir Ragimov	Communist Party	1,955	19.44%
Sergey Amerkhanov	Liberal Democratic Party	1,102	10.96%
Total		10,054	100%

==== District 17 ====
Summary of the 8–10 September 2023 Legislative Assembly of Vladimir Oblast election in District 17
Candidate	Party	Votes	%
Igor Lashmanov (incumbent)	United Russia	7,760	74.85%
Aleksandr Bumagin	Communist Party	1,003	9.67%
Yulia Igonina	Liberal Democratic Party	991	9.56%
Roman Bratolyubov	A Just Russia — For Truth	395	3.81%
Total		10,368	100%

==== District 18 ====
Summary of the 8–10 September 2023 Legislative Assembly of Vladimir Oblast election in District 18
Candidate	Party	Votes	%
Andrey Fateyev (incumbent)	United Russia	8,523	73.26%
Dmitry Bocharov	Communist Party	1,326	11.40%
Artyom Dudarev	Liberal Democratic Party	944	8.11%
Vladimir Puzankov	A Just Russia — For Truth	545	4.68%
Total		11,634	100%

==== District 19 ====
Summary of the 8–10 September 2023 Legislative Assembly of Vladimir Oblast election in District 19
Candidate	Party	Votes	%
Aleksandr Zakharov	United Russia	13,502	68.79%
Tatyana Ganabova	Liberal Democratic Party	2,688	13.69%
Marina Grubaya	Communist Party	2,116	10.78%
Iosif Gorvat	A Just Russia — For Truth	774	3.94%
Total		19,628	100%

==== District 20 ====
Summary of the 8–10 September 2023 Legislative Assembly of Vladimir Oblast election in District 20
Candidate	Party	Votes	%
Inna Gavrilova (incumbent)	United Russia	4,078	51.82%
Olga Antonova	Communist Party	1,610	20.46%
Maria Ivanova	Liberal Democratic Party	1,106	14.06%
Roman Glebov	A Just Russia — For Truth	845	10.74%
Total		7,869	100%

==== District 21 ====
Summary of the 8–10 September 2023 Legislative Assembly of Vladimir Oblast election in District 21
Candidate	Party	Votes	%
Eduard Zubov	United Russia	3,869	45.75%
Dmitry Gladkov	Communist Party	1,549	18.32%
Yevgeny Balandin	New People	1,326	15.68%
Andrey Trubnikov	Liberal Democratic Party	906	10.71%
Natalia Zabolotnaya	A Just Russia — For Truth	552	6.53%
Total		8,456	100%

==== District 22 ====
Summary of the 8–10 September 2023 Legislative Assembly of Vladimir Oblast election in District 22
Candidate	Party	Votes	%
Lyudmila Nikitina	United Russia	8,154	66.48%
Denis Butylin	Liberal Democratic Party	1,377	11.23%
Andrey Kachalov	Communist Party	1,102	8.98%
Galina Karlagina	A Just Russia — For Truth	699	5.70%
Anna Svistunova	New People	617	5.03%
Total		12,265	100%

==== District 23 ====
Summary of the 8–10 September 2023 Legislative Assembly of Vladimir Oblast election in District 23
Candidate	Party	Votes	%
Vyacheslav Kartukhin (incumbent)	United Russia	9,752	69.01%
Dmitry Tsepov	Communist Party	1,480	10.47%
Dmitry Dudorov	Liberal Democratic Party	866	6.13%
Yelena Mokhnacheva	New People	848	6.00%
Aleksey Kuzin	A Just Russia — For Truth	835	5.91%
Total		14,132	100%

==== District 24 ====
Summary of the 8–10 September 2023 Legislative Assembly of Vladimir Oblast election in District 24
Candidate	Party	Votes	%
Roman Kavinov (incumbent)	United Russia	9,812	73.79%
Albert Romanov	Communist Party	1,492	11.22%
Tatyana Shevchenko	Liberal Democratic Party	1,151	8.66%
Valery Kamensky	A Just Russia — For Truth	627	4.71%
Total		13,298	100%

==== District 25 ====
Summary of the 8–10 September 2023 Legislative Assembly of Vladimir Oblast election in District 25
Candidate	Party	Votes	%
Valery Telegin	United Russia	10,444	62.60%
Sergey Prusov	Communist Party	1,794	10.75%
Andrey Bibikov	Liberal Democratic Party	1,668	10.00%
Nina Kapitanova	New People	1,645	9.86%
Stanislav Mankov	A Just Russia — For Truth	746	4.47%
Total		16,685	100%

== See also ==
- 2023 Russian regional elections
