= Vladimir Kiselyov (politician) =

Russian politician (born 1958)

- Владимир Киселёв
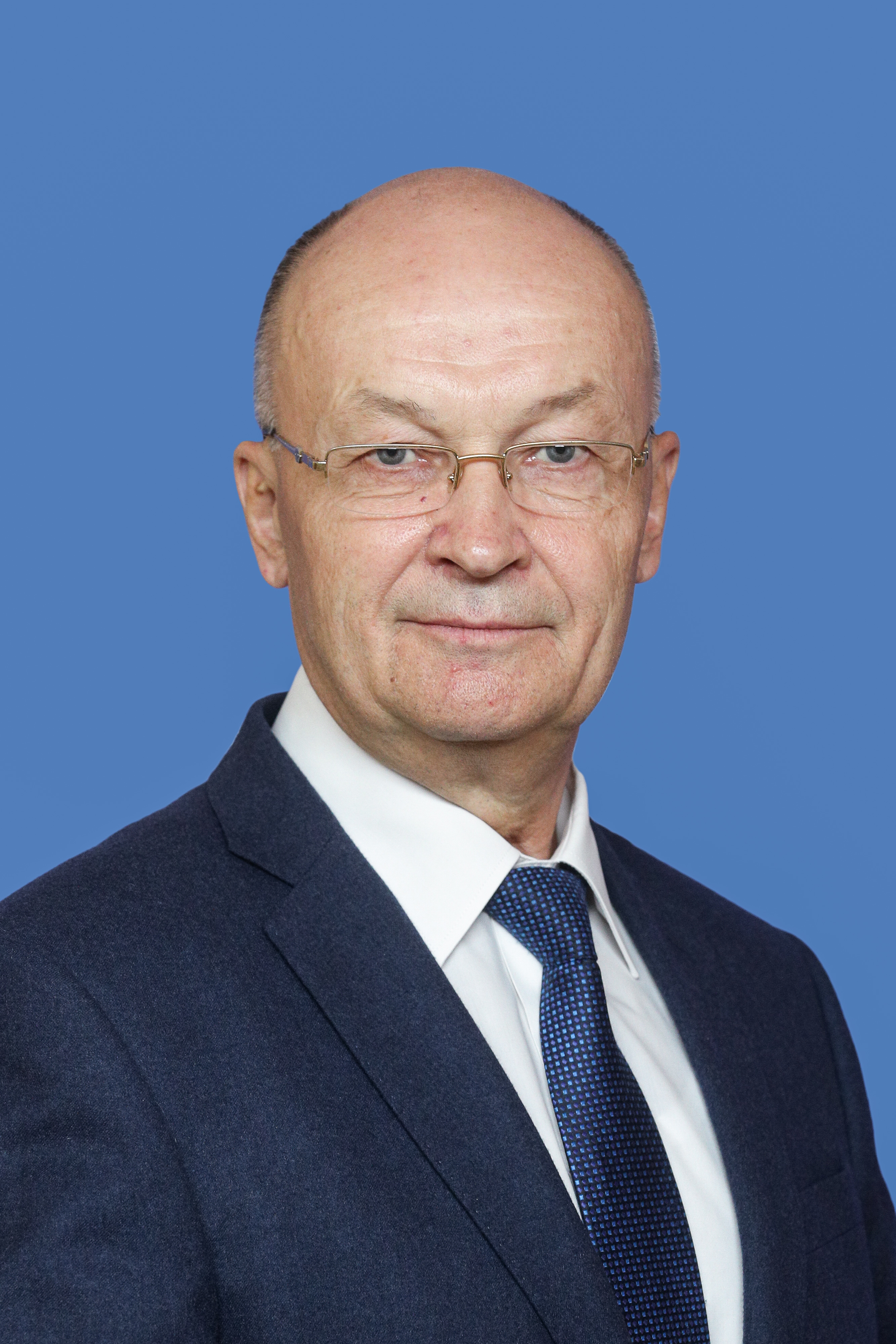

Senator from Vladimir Oblast
- Incumbent
- Assumed office 22 September 2023
- Preceded by: Olga Khokhlova

Chairman of the Legislative Assembly of Vladimir Oblast
- In office 18 March 2009 – 22 September 2023
- Succeeded by: Olga Khokhlova

Personal details
- Born: 3 August 1958 (age 68) Vladimir, RSFSR, Soviet Union
- Party: United Russia
- Other political affiliations: Unity; CPSU
- Education: Vladimir Polytechnic Institute

Military service
- Branch/service: Soviet Armed Forces

Vladimir Nikolaevich Kiselyov (Russian: Владимир Николаевич Киселёв; born August 3, 1958, Vladimir) is a Russian politician. He is a Senator of the Federation Council representing the Legislative Assembly of Vladimir Oblast (since September 22, 2023). He is a member of the Federation Council Committee on Budget and Financial Markets. He served as Chairman of the Legislative Assembly of Vladimir Oblast from March 18, 2009, to September 22, 2023.

Secretary of the Vladimir Regional Branch of the Unity Party (2000–2001).

He served as secretary of the Vladimir Regional Branch of the United Russia Party from 2001 to 2010 and from 2018 to 2021.

== Biography ==
Vladimir Kiselyov was born in Vladimir on August 3, 1958.

He received a higher education diploma from the Vladimir Polytechnic Institute, qualifying as a radio equipment design engineer and technologist.

In 1975, he found his first job as an apprentice mechanic at the Vladimir Elektropribor plant.

In 1976, he was conscripted into the Soviet Armed Forces and served until 1978 in a unit of the USSR Airborne Forces.

In 1978, he returned to the Elektropribor plant and worked there as a radio equipment adjuster until 1982.

In 1982, he was elected Secretary of the Elektropribor plant's Komsomol Committee.

From 1984 to 1987, he served as First Secretary of the Vladimir City Komsomol Committee.

From 1985 to 1989, he was elected to the Vladimir City Council of People's Deputies.

From 1987 to 1989, he served as the head of the organizational department of the Vladimir Oktyabrsky District Committee of the Communist Party of the Soviet Union.

From 1989 to 2002, he managed various enterprises in Vladimir.

In 2002, he transferred to municipal government and was appointed First Deputy Head of Vladimir, responsible for economic development in Vladimir.

After winning the municipal elections, he was promoted to Deputy Chairman of the Vladimir City Council of People's Deputies. He founded the Vladimir Mortgage Fund and served as Chairman of the Fund's Board.

In 2004, he won the elections to the Legislative Assembly of Vladimir Oblast and became First Deputy Chairman. In March 2009, he was re-elected to the Legislative Assembly of Vladimir Oblast. On March 18, 2009, at the Assembly's first meeting, he was elected Chairman. He served in this position for three terms.

In September 2023, he was elected Senator to the Federation Council from the Legislative Assembly of Vladimir Oblast.

== Awards ==
Order of Friendship

- Medal "For Merit in Conducting the All-Russian Population Census"
- Presidential Certificate of Honour
- Presidential Letter of Gratitude
- Certificate of Honor of the Federation Council of the Federal Assembly
