= Governor of Vladimir Oblast =

Highest-ranking official in Vladimir Oblast, Russia

- Standard of the Governor

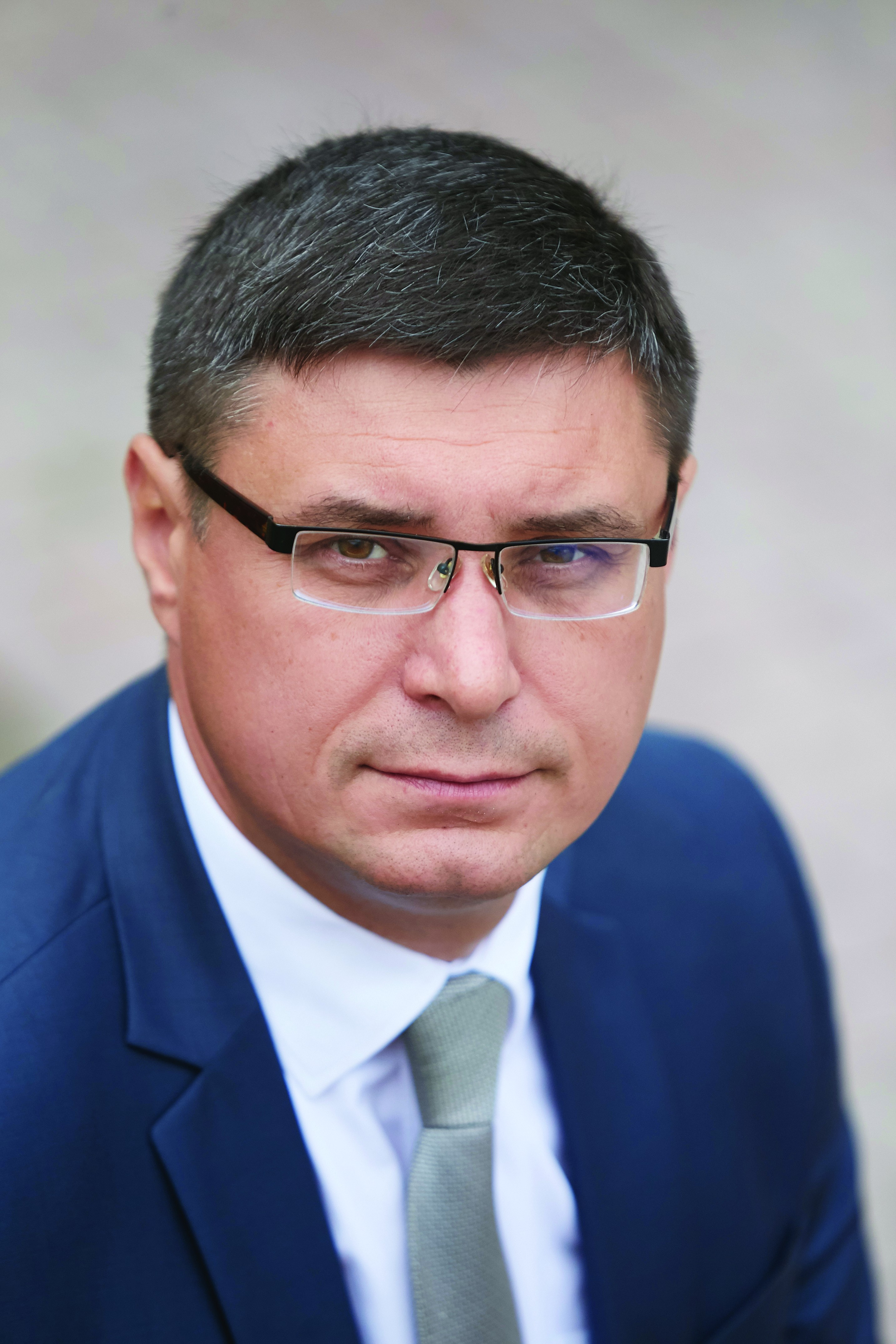
- Incumbent; Aleksandr Avdeyev since 4 October 2021
- Seat: Vladimir
- Term length: 5 years
- Inaugural holder: Yury Vlasov
- Formation: 1991
- Website: avo.ru

The governor of Vladimir Oblast (Russian: Губернатор Владимирской области) is the highest official of Vladimir Oblast, a region in Central Russia. He heads the supreme executive body of the region — the Administration of Vladimir Oblast.

== History of office ==
At the initial stage of post-Soviet history of Russia, it was assumed that the elections of regional leaders would be introduced in all regions. In August 1991, Russian president Boris Yeltsin promised an early elections. For the transition period, a new institution was created — the head of the regional administration appointed by the president. On 25 September, by presidential decree, Yury Vlasov, 30-year-old deputy head of Vladimir City Executive Committee, was appointed Head of Administration of Vladimir Oblast. He became the youngest governor in Russia.

The 1st Legislative Assembly of Vladimir Oblast (March 1994 — December 1996) led by Communist Nikolay Vinogradov tried to get the Russian president to set gubernatorial elections in the region. In September 1996, Boris Yeltsin signed a decree "On the election of the head of administration of Vladimir Oblast", which allowed the election in December that year. Vlasov lost this election to Vinogradov. In 2000 the office of the head of administration was renamed into governor of Vladimir Oblast.

== List of office-holders ==
This is a list of governors of Vladimir Oblast:

No.	Portrait	Governor	Tenure	Time in office	Party	Election
1		Yury Vlasov (1961–2019)	25 September 1991 – 17 December 1996 (lost election)	5 years, 83 days	Independent	Appointed
2		Nikolay Vinogradov (1947–2025)	17 December 1996 – 24 March 2013 (term end)	16 years, 97 days	Communist	1996; 2000; 2005; 2009
–		Svetlana Orlova (born 1954)	24 March 2013 – 23 September 2013	5 years, 198 days	United Russia	Acting
3		Svetlana Orlova (born 1954)	23 September 2013 – 8 October 2018 (lost re-election)	5 years, 198 days	United Russia	2013
4		Vladimir Sipyagin (born 1970)	8 October 2018 – 4 October 2021 (resigned)	2 years, 361 days	Liberal Democratic	2018
–		Aleksandr Avdeyev (born 1975)	4 October 2021 – 16 September 2022	4 years, 338 days	United Russia	Acting
5		Aleksandr Avdeyev (born 1975)	16 September 2022 – present	4 years, 338 days	United Russia	2022
