= Shatov =

Shatov (Russian: Шатов) is a Russian masculine surname, its feminine counterpart is Shatova. It may refer to

- Edward Shatov (born 1973), Russian Catholic priest
- Oleg Shatov (born 1990), Russian football player
- Nikolay Shatov (1909–1992), Russian weightlifter
- Panteleimon Shatov (born 1950), Russian Orthodox Bishop
