= Aleksey Govyrin =

Russian politician (born 1983)

Alexei Govyrin
- Алексей Говырин
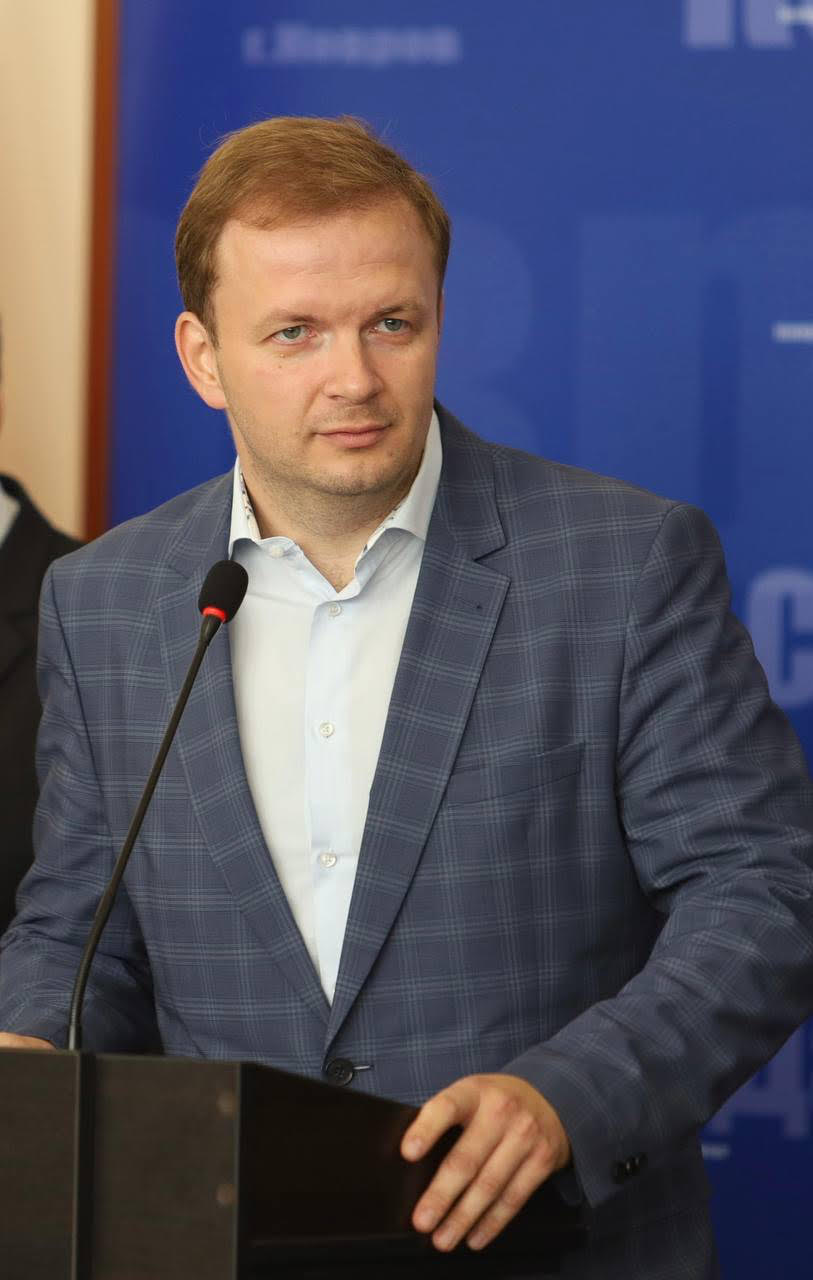

Deputy of the 8th State Duma
- Incumbent
- Assumed office 19 September 2021

Personal details
- Born: 26 May 1983 (age 43) Kovrov, Vladimir Oblast, Russian Soviet Federative Socialist Republic, USSR
- Party: United Russia
- Spouse: Irina Slutskaya
- Education: Kovrov State Technological Academy

Alexei Borisovich Govyrin (Russian: Алексей Борисович Говырин; born 26 May 1983, Kovrov) is a Russian political figure and a deputy of 8th State Duma and 9th State Duma.

In 2006 he started working in the "Askona" company, first as a manager and, later, as a Wholesale Sales Director. In the 2010s, he became the General Director of "Askona-Vek". On September 9, 2018, he was elected deputy of the Legislative Assembly of Vladimir Oblast of the 5th convocation. Since September 2021, he has served as a deputy of the 8th State Duma from the Vladimir Oblast and Ivanovo Oblast constituency.

== Sanctions ==
He was sanctioned by Canada under the Special Economic Measures Act (S.C. 1992, c. 17) in relation to the Russian invasion of Ukraine for Grave Breach of International Peace and Security, and by the UK government in 2022 in relation to Russo-Ukrainian War.

He is one of the members of the State Duma the United States Treasury sanctioned on 24 March 2022 in response to the 2022 Russian invasion of Ukraine.
