= Nikolay Vinogradov =

Russian politician (1947–2025)

- Николай Виноградов
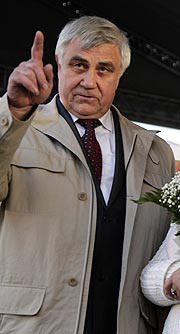
- Vinogradov in 2008

2nd Governor of Vladimir Oblast
- In office 7 December 1996 – 24 March 2013
- Preceded by: Yury Vlasov
- Succeeded by: Svetlana Orlova

Personal details
- Born: 22 April 1947 Vladimir, Russian SFSR, USSR
- Died: 12 June 2025 (aged 78)
- Party: CPSU (1973–1991); CPRF (1993–2025)
- Spouse: Lyudmilla Anatolyevna
- Children: 2 daughters

Nikolay Vladimirovich Vinogradov (Russian: Николай Владимирович Виноградов; 22 April 1947 – 12 June 2025) was a Russian politician who was the governor of Vladimir Oblast.

== Political career ==
In 1973, Vinogradov joined the Communist Party of the Soviet Union. He served in various roles in local party committees and the city administration for Vladimir until he was elected as governor (now as a member of the Communist Party of the Russian Federation) for the oblast in 1996. Vinogradov won re-election in 2000 and 2004, and after elections for governors were scrapped in favor of direct appointments by the Kremlin, was re-appointed governor in 2009 by President Dmitry Medvedev. Vinogradov was also a member of the Federation Council from 1997 until 2001, where his focus was on the budget, tax policy, financial, currency and customs regulation, and bank activity committees.

== Personal life and death ==
Vinogradov was married and had two daughters. He died on 12 June 2025, at the age of 78.
