= 2018 Vladimir Oblast gubernatorial election =

| ← 2013 | 9 and 23 September 2018 | 2022 → |
- Turnout: 32.96% (1st round); 38.29% (2nd round)
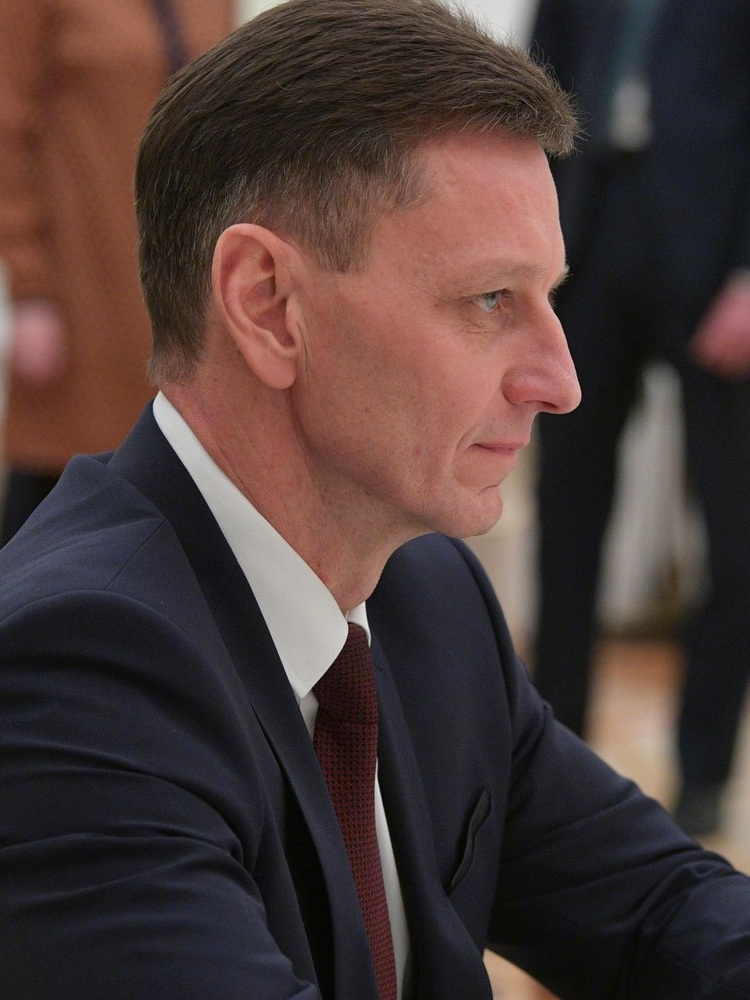

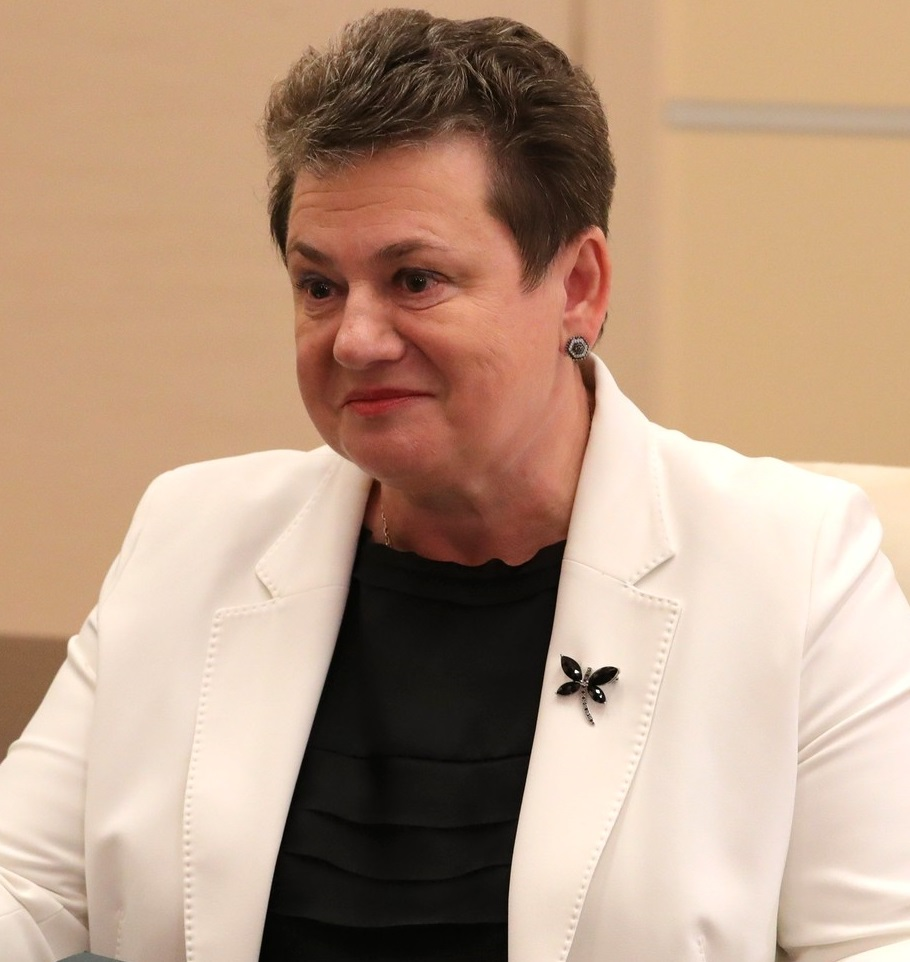
| Candidate | Vladimir Sipyagin | Svetlana Orlova |
| Party | LDPR | United Russia |
| Popular vote | 247,630 | 162,639 |
| Percentage | 57.03% | 37.46% |
- 2018 Vladimir Oblast gubernatorial election results by municipality
Governor before election
Svetlana Orlova
United Russia
Elected Governor
Vladimir Sipyagin
LDPR

The 2018 Vladimir Oblast gubernatorial election was held in September 2018, on common election day.

In the first round, held on 9 September, none of the candidates received an absolute majority. The second round, which was take place on 22 September, came the incumbent Governor Svetlana Orlova, nominated by the United Russia, and Vladimir Sipyagin, nominated by the Liberal Democratic Party.

In the second round Vladimir Sipyagin defeating incumbent Governor Svetlana Orlova.

== Candidate ==
Four candidates were registered to participate in the election

| Candidate | Party | Office |
|---|---|---|
| Sergey Biryukov | A Just Russia | Chief of the department of the party on work with regions of management of organizational and party work |
| Sergey Glumov | Patriots of Russia | Entrepreneur |
| Svetlana Orlova | United Russia | Incumbent Governor |
| Vladimir Sipyagin | Liberal Democratic Party | Member of the Legislative Assembly of Vladimir Oblast |

== Results ==
The results of the first (left) and second (right) rounds by territorial election commissions. Vladimir Sipyagin Svetlana Orlova

Summary of the 9 and 23 September 2018 Vladimir Oblast gubernatorial election results
| Candidate | Party | | 1st round | | 2nd round | |
| Candidate | Party | | Votes | % | Votes | % |
|---|---|---|---|---|---|---|
| Svetlana Orlova | United Russia | UR | 135,633 | 36.42 | 162,639 | 37.46 |
| Vladimir Sipyagin | Liberal Democratic Party | LDPR | 116,135 | 31.19 | 247,630 | 57.03 |
| Sergey Biryukov | A Just Russia | JR | 65,105 | 17.48 | | |
| Sergey Glumov | Patriots of Russia | PR | 25,371 | 6.81 | | |
| Total | | | 342,244 | 100.00 | 410,269 | 100.00 |
| Valid votes | | | 342,244 | 91,91 | 410,269 | 94.49 |
| Blank ballots | | | 30,121 | 8.09 | 23,918 | 5.51 |
| Turnout | | | 372,365 | 32.96 | 434,284 | 38.29 |
| Registered voters | | | 1,130,533 | | 1,134,328 | |
Official results published by the Vladimir Oblast Electoral Commission
