= Vladimir Sipyagin =

Russian politician

Vladimir Sipyagin MP
- Владимир Сипягин
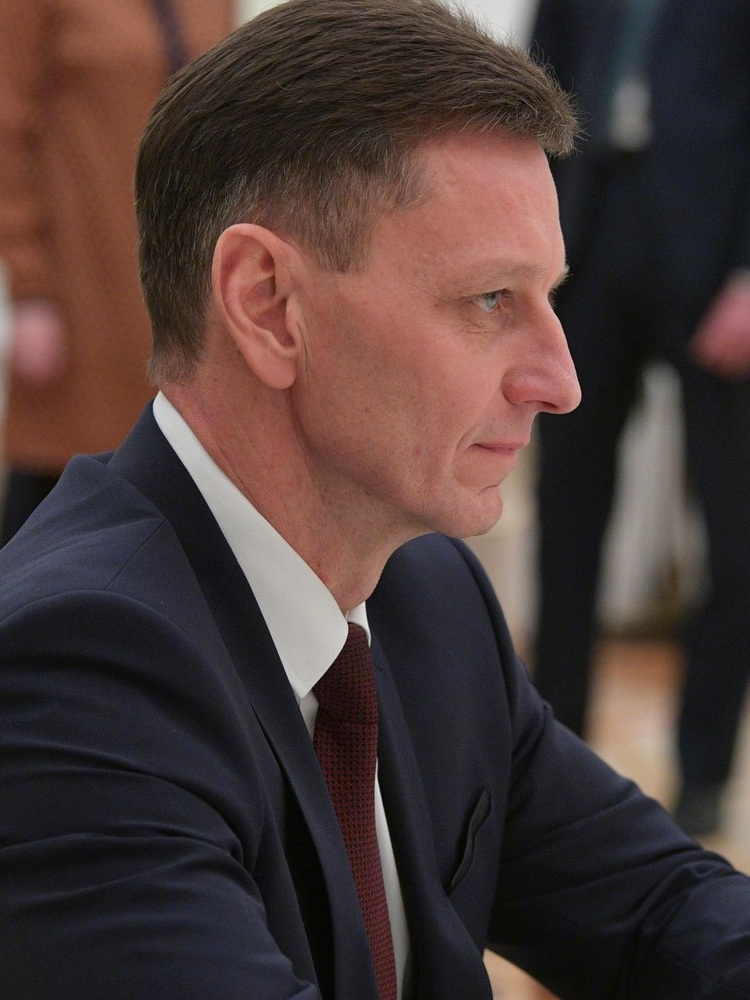
- Sipyagin in 2018

Member of the State Duma (Party List Seat)
- Incumbent
- Assumed office 12 October 2021

4th Governor of Vladimir Oblast
- In office 8 October 2018 – 4 October 2021
- Preceded by: Svetlana Orlova
- Succeeded by: Aleksandr Avdeyev

Member of the Legislative Assembly of Vladimir Oblast
- In office 8 September 2013 – 8 October 2018

Personal details
- Born: 19 February 1970 (age 55) Kharkov, Ukrainian SSR, Soviet Union
- Party: LDPR
- Children: 4 (2 sons, 2 daughters)
- Parent: Vladimir Yakovlevich Sipyagin (father)
- Education: RANEPA (MPA)

Vladimir Vladimirovich Sipyagin (Russian: Владимир Владимирович Сипягин; born 19 February 1970) is a Russian statesman and politician. He was the fourth Governor of Vladimir Oblast from 2018 to 2021, and his election was one of the few upsets of the 2018 Russian gubernatorial elections amidst anti-establishment sentiment in the country.

He was the chairman of the Committee on Agrarian Policy, Nature Management and Ecology in the Legislative Assembly of Vladimir Oblast from 23 September 2013 to 8 October 2018.

== Biography ==
Vladimir Sipyagin was born in Kharkov, Ukrainian SSR, Soviet Union on 19 February 1970. His father was Vladimir Yakovlevich Sipyagin (1940-2011).

In 2001, he graduated from the Vladimir branch of the Russian Academy of Civil Service under the President of Russia with a degree in Public and Municipal Administration. In 2012, he entered the master's program of the Russian Academy of National Economy and Civil Service under the President of the Russian Federation, majoring in "State and Municipal Administration".

From 2012 to 2016, he was an Assistant Deputy of the State Duma to Vitaly Zolochevsky.

On 14 October 2012, Sipyagin ran for the Councils of People's Deputies of the city of Alexandrov and the Alexandrovsky district from the LDPR party in single-mandate constituencies No. 5 and No. 2, respectively. In the fifth constituency he took the fourth place (4.82%) out of five, in the second - the last third place (9.1%), as a result, Sipyagin lost the election.

Since 8 September 2013, he has been a member and leader of the LDPR faction in the Legislative Assembly of Vladimir Oblast. He has been re-elected as member of the Legislative Assembly of the Vladimir Oblast from the Liberal Democratic Party on a single day of voting on 9 September 2018.

In 2013, Sipyagin became the coordinator of the Vladimir Oblast branch of the LDPR political party, replacing Zolochevsky. In April 2015, he resigned as regional coordinator, giving way to his deputy, Ilya Potapov.

On 13 September 2015, he participated in the elections to the Council of People's Deputies of Vladimir of the 27th convocation under the second number on the LDPR list. He was elected, but after the election he refused the mandate.

On 18 September 2016, he ran for the State Duma of the VII convocation from the Liberal Democratic Party: he headed the regional group for the Vladimir region No. 53, and was also nominated for the single-mandate constituency No. 79. He did not go to the State Duma according to the list, in the district he gained 10.05%, taking third a place out of ten candidates (United Russia member Igor Igoshin became a State Duma member).

He was the chairman of the Board of the Association of Subsoil Users of the Vladimir Region, (before taking office in 2018). Until 2018, he was chairman of the Committee on Agrarian Policy, Nature Management and Ecology in the Legislative Assembly of the Vladimir region.

=== Governor of Vladimir Oblast ===
Sipyagin ran twice for governor of the Vladimir Oblast: in 2013 and 2018.

On 8 September 2013, he took part in the election of the governor of the Vladimir Oblast, according to the results of the vote, he gained 3.88% of the vote, losing to the Communist Party candidate Anatoly Bobrov (10.64%) and United Russia party Svetlana Orlova (74.73%).

On a single voting day, 9 September 2018, he took part in the election of the governor of Vladimir Oblast. Since none of the candidates received the majority of votes, allowing them to be elected governor, a second round was appointed for 23 September 2018, in which Sipyagin had to compete with the current governor and candidate from United Russia, Orlova, who scored 36 in the first round. 42% of the votes. In the second round, Sipyagin received the majority of the votes (57.03%), ahead of Orlova.

On 26 September 2018, he was recognized as the elected governor of Vladimir Oblast by the Election Commission of Vladimir Oblast. On 8 October 2018 Sipyagin was officially inaugurated as governor.

On 29 September 2021 Sipyagin resigned from the governorship. As his press service stated, "Vladimir Sipyagin decided to move to work in the State Duma. At the federal level, he would be able to do more for Vladimir Oblast." He was included in the LDPR party list on the election to the 8th State Duma. This came one year after Sergei Furgal, who also unexpectedly beat the United Russia candidate, Khabarovsk Krai, was jailed. He was succeeded as governor by Aleksandr Avdeyev.

=== Sanctions ===
On February 23, 2022, he was added to the European Union sanctions list for actions and policies that undermine the territorial integrity, sovereignty, and independence of Ukraine and further destabilize the country.

On February 24, 2022, he was included in Canada's sanctions list of “close associates of the regime” for voting in favor of recognizing the independence of the “so-called republics in Donetsk and Luhansk”.

On March 24, 2022, amid Russia's invasion of Ukraine, he was added to the U.S. sanctions list for “participating in Putin's war” and “supporting the Kremlin's efforts to invade Ukraine”. The U.S. Department of State stated that members of the State Duma use their authority to persecute dissenters and political opponents, suppress freedom of information, and restrict human rights and fundamental freedoms of Russian citizens.

Subsequently, on similar grounds, he was also sanctioned by the United Kingdom, Switzerland, Australia, Ukraine, and New Zealand.

== Personal life ==
=== Family ===
He has four children: two daughters and two sons.

=== Hobbies ===
He is engaged in boxing, wrestling. He is president of the branch of the Speed Skating Federation in Vladimir Oblast.
