= Anthem of Vladimir Oblast =

Unofficial regional anthem in Russia

Гимн Владимирской области
English: "Anthem of Vladimir Oblast"
- Coat of arms of Vladimir Oblast
- Unofficial regional anthem of Vladimir Oblast
- Lyrics: Andrei Filinov
- Music: Alexei Sidortsev
- Published: 12 September 2011

Audio sample
- Instrumental recording: file; help

The Anthem of Vladimir Oblast is the unofficial regional anthem of the Vladimir Oblast, a federal subject of Russia. The lyrics were written by Andrey Filinov, the director of the Vladimir branch of the All-Russia State Television and Radio Broadcasting Company "GTRK "Vladimir" and the music was composed by Alexei Sidortsev.

== History ==
On May 6, 2013 the acting governor of the Vladimir Oblast, Svetlana Orlova instructed Artem Markin, the chief conductor of the Vladimir Governor's Orchestra and the Vladimir City Brass Band to start working on the creation of an anthem for the region. The press service of the regional administration said that "Similar anthems already exist in many regions of the country."

On June 28, 2013 Acting Governor Orlova signed Decree No758 "On holding a competition for the creation of the anthem of the Vladimir region". The competition dragged on for more than a year, and was extended twice. The deadline for accepting applications was first extended to December 1, 2013 then to August 15, 2014. During the first stage of the competition, Filinov and Sidortsev's submission was originally rejected.

Professional and amateur composers and writers were allowed to take part in the competition, regardless of their age and affiliation with certain creative organizations. The anthem had to contain no more than four verses and four refrains with a duration of no more than 4 minutes. The anthem was to be intended for orchestral, choral, or orchestral and choral performance. According to Governor Orlova, the anthem was required to have a highly artistic musical and poetic work, patriotic, and "life-affirming character". The anthem of the region needed to evoke a sense of respect for the history and traditions of the land among the residents of the region.

On September 10, 2014 the commission considered 22 new options. Among them was the anthem that Filinov and Sidortsev submitted, which was previously rejected at the first stage, but was now "finalized".

On September 29, 2014 the Administration of the Vladimir Oblast ordered Decree No 472-r "On Approval of the Winners of the Competition for the Creation of the Anthem of the Vladimir Region". Andrei Filinov and Alexei Sifortsev were approved as the winners of the competition for the creation of the Anthem of Vladimir Oblast. The winners of the competition were determined by a special commission, headed by the deputy governor of the region Mikhail Kolkov. The jury also included the artistic director of the Vladimir Regional Philharmonic Anatoly Antonov, the chairman of the board of the regional branch of the Union of Writers of Russia, Honored Worker of Culture of the Russian Federation Svetlana Baranova, the artistic director of the state vocal and choreographic ensemble "Rus" Nikolai Litvinov, the director of the Center for Classical Music, the chief conductor of the Vladimir Governor's Symphony Orchestra Artem Markin, the rector of the Nizhny Novgorod State Conservatory, and the People's Artist of Russia Eduard Fertelmeister. Nine members of the competition committee liked the anthem, and only one voted against it. It is unknown as to who voted against it because the vote was kept secret. The rector of the Nizhny Novgorod State Conservatory was not present at the meeting of the commission.

On October 10, 2014 at the end of the festive celebrations dedicated to the 70th anniversary of the Vladimir Oblast held at the Vladimir Academic Drama Theater, the Anthem of Vladimir Oblast was presented to the general public for the first time. The anthem was performed by Tatyana Prokushkina, the Vladimir Governor's Symphony Orchestra, the Vladimir Chamber Choir, the Vladimir Boys' Chapel conducted by Artem Markin, and Governor Orlova.

== Unofficial anthem ==
Since 2014, the anthem has practically not been performed at official events of the region and is performed in concert programs at various regional events on an irregular basis. On the website of the regional administration, there is no information about the anthem. The regional administration says that the text of the order approving the winners of the competition does not contain the term "official anthem". A second competition is not planned according to the regional administration.

== Lyrics ==
Russian official

I
Славься, отчий край, Руси великой исток,
Благодатен и щедр, широк!
Пролетают века — земля заветами крепка
Силой велик ты, наш Владимир, делом высок!

Припев:
Тысячу раз сердце спроси
И только один ты услышишь ответ.
Владимирский край — сердце России.
Тысячу лет мудрости свет!

II
Твой народ душою крепок, нравом силён —
Не забудем святых имен!
Охранял ратный меч родную веру, правду, речь.
В наших сердцах сияет пламя русских знамён.

Припев

III
Нам детей растить, крепить Отчизну трудом,
В мире жить вечно молодом.
Каждый день, круглый год наш край Владимирский цветёт!
Счастья и радости тебе, отеческий дом.

Припев

Russian Latin alphabet

I
Slavʹsja, otčij kraj, Rusi velikoj istok,
Blagodaten i ŝedr, širok!
Proletajut veka — zemlja zavetami krepka.
Siloj velik ty, naš Vladimir, delom vysok!

Pripev:
Tysjaču raz serdce sprosi
I tolʹko odin ty uslyšišʹ otvet.
Vladimirskij kraj — serdce Rossii.
Tysjaču let mudrosti svet!

II
Tvoj narod dušoju krepok, nravom silën —
Ne zabudem svjatyh imen!
Ohranjal ratnyj meč rodnuju veru, pravdu, rečʹ.
V naših serdcah sijaet plamja russkih znamën.

Pripev

III
Nam detej rastitʹ, krepitʹ Otčiznu trudom,
V mire žitʹ večno molodom.
Každyj denʹ, kruglyj god naš kraj Vladimirskij cvetët!
Sčastʹja i radosti tebe, otečeskij dom.

Pripev

English

I
Glory to you, fatherland, source of the great Rus',
Blessed and generous, how wide!
Centuries fly by — this land is strong with covenants.
You are great in strength, our Vladimir, high in deed!

Chorus:
Ask your heart a thousand times
And only one answer you shall hear.
The Vladimir Region — is the heart of Russia.
The light of wisdom for a thousand years!

II
Your people are strong in soul, strong in character —
We will not forget those holy names!
The military's sword guards the native faith, truth, and speech.
In our hearts, the flame of Russian banners shine.

Chorus

III
We must raise children, strengthen the fatherland with labor,
Live in an eternally youthful world.
Every day, all year round, our Vladimir Region blooms!
Happiness and joy to you, Fatherland home.

Chorus
