= Shokhin =

Shokhin (Russian: Шохин) is a Russian masculine surname. Its feminine counterpart is Shokhina. Notable people with this last name include:

- Alexander Shokhin (born 1951), Russian politician
- Andrey Shokhin (born 1961), Russian politician
- Anna Shokhina (born 1997), Russian ice hockey player

== See also ==
- Shokin
