= Yury Vlasov (politician) =

Russian economist and statesman (1961–2019)

- Юрий Власов
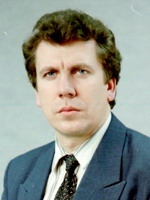

1st Head of Administration of Vladimir Oblast
- In office 25 September 1991 – 17 December 1996
- President: Boris Yeltsin
- Preceded by: Office established
- Succeeded by: Nikolay Vinogradov

Member of the Federation Council
- In office 11 January 1994 – 17 December 1996

Personal details
- Born: Yury Vasilyevich Vlasov; 22 June 1961 Prikumsk, Stavropol Krai, Russian SFSR, Soviet Union
- Died: 9 January 2019 (aged 57) Vladimir, Russia
- Children: 1 daughter
- Education: Sergo Ordzhonikidze Moscow Institute of Management

Yury Vasilyevich Vlasov (Russian: Юрий Васильевич Власов; 22 June 1961 – 9 January 2019) was a Russian economist and statesman who served as the first Head of Administration (Governor) of Vladimir Oblast. He died on 9 January 2019.

== Biography ==
Yury Vlasov was born in Prikumsk (modern Budyonnovsk) in Stavropol Krai on 22 June 1961.

He graduated from the Moscow Institute of Management in 1983, and was a graduate school in 1988, as a candidate of economic sciences.

From 1983 to 1985, he was an economist at the Pyatigorsk House-Building Plant. From 1985 to 1986, he had become a researcher at the Economic Research Department of the Research Institute in Vladimir. In 1988, he had become a Junior Researcher as the All-Union FMD Institute in Vladimir.

In 1990, Vlasov was elected to the Vladimir Regional Council. In September 1991, he was appointed as Deputy Chairman of the Executive Committee of the Vladimir City Council, and then, on September 25, he was appointed as the Governor of the Vladimir Oblast. At the age of 30 years and three months Vlasov became the youngest of Yeltsin's appointees.

In December 1993, he was elected a deputy to the Federation Council of the first convocation, and was a member of the Committee on Budget, Financial, Currency and Credit Regulation, Money Issue, Tax Policy and Customs Regulation. In January 1996, he became a member of the Council of Federation of the second convocation ex officio, was a member of the Committee on Economic Policy, then a member of the Committee on Social Policy.

Vlasov lost the reelection in December 1996, to Nikolay Vinogradov, he gained 21% of the vote.

From 1997 to 2001, he worked as Deputy Head of the Central Bank of Russia for the Vladimir Oblast. In 2000, he again ran for the post of governor of the Vladimir Oblast, and took second place, gaining 15.96% of the vote.

From 2004 to 2006, he had become the Director of Regional Programs at the Institute of Urban Economics in Moscow.

From 2007 to 2010, he was a Deputy Director of the Institute "International Financial Center", and director of the Department of State and Municipal Management.

From 2010, Vlasov had finally become director of the Advanced Training Programs for state and municipal employees of the Russian Presidential Academy of National Economy and Public Administration until his death on 9 January 2019.

He was married, and had a daughter.
