= Koloksha =

Koloksha Колокша
- Village
- Location within Vladimir Oblast Location within Russia
- Coordinates: 56°04′N 40°08′E
- Country: Russia
- Region: Vladimir Oblast
- District: Sobinsky District
- Time zone: UTC+3:00

Koloksha (Russian: Колокша) is a rural locality (a village) in Kolokshanskoye Rural Settlement, Sobinsky District, Vladimir Oblast, Russia. The population was 31 as of 2010. There are 6 streets.

== Geography ==
Koloksha is located on the Koloksha River, 20 km northeast of Sobinka (the district's administrative centre) by road. Parfentyevo is the nearest rural locality.
