= Vladimir State University =

University in Vladimir, Russia

- Владимирский государственный университет
- Type: Public university
- Established: 1958; 68 years ago
- Location: Vladimir, Vladimir Oblast, Russia; 56°08′47″N 40°22′45″E
- Campus: urban
- Language: Russian
- Building details
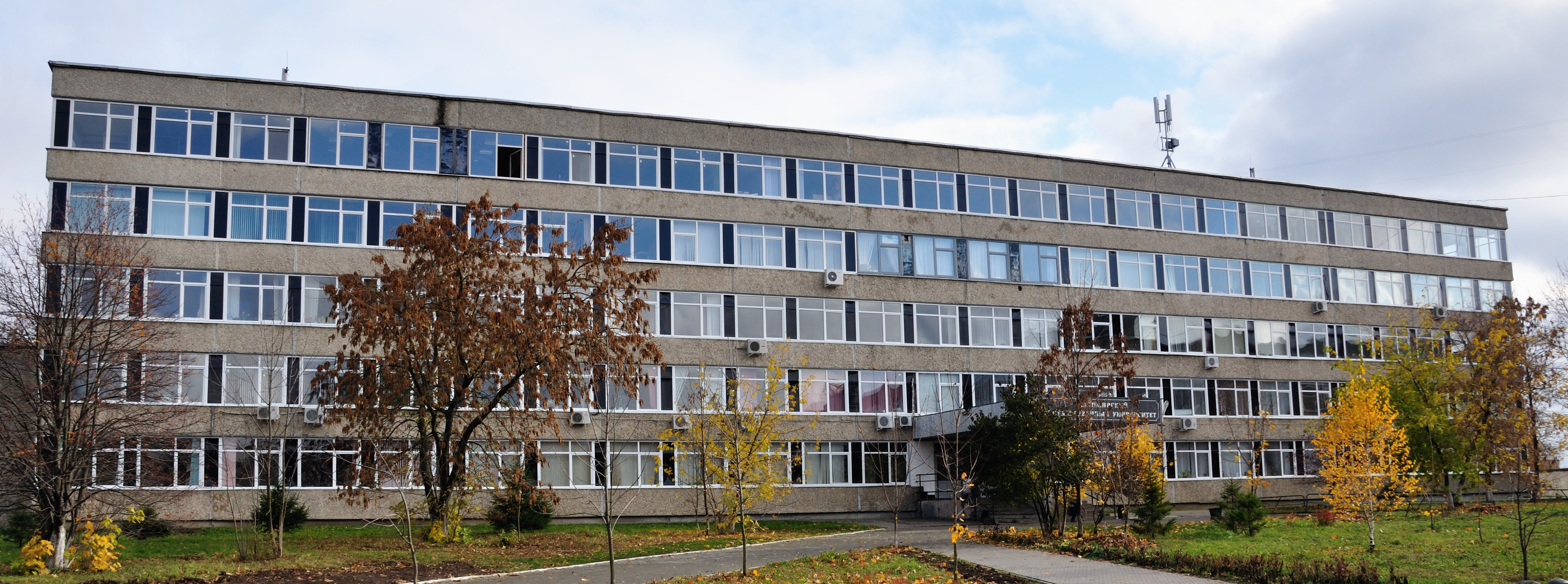

University rankings

Regional – Overall
- QS Emerging Europe and Central Asia: 401-450 (2022)

Vladimir State University is a higher educational institution in Vladimir, Russia. It is currently recognized as the largest university in Vladimir Oblast and one of the largest in the Central Federal District. In April 2017, it became one of the flagship universities of the region. Since January 24, 2013, Anzor Mikhailovich Saralidze has been the rector of the university.

== History ==
On August 1, 1958, by a decree of the Council of Ministers of the RSFSR, the Vladimir branch of the Moscow Evening Machine-Building Institute was opened with two faculties: mechanical-engineering and machine building. The institute initially admitted 200 students.

In 1962, in connection with the liquidation of the Moscow Evening Engineering Institute, the Vladimir branch was transferred to the jurisdiction of the Moscow Institute of Electrical Engineering. In February 1964, the branch was transformed into the Vladimir Evening Polytechnic Institute. In the same year, the machine building faculty for radio parts was created, of which the first dean was B. F. Gradusov.

In 1969 Vladimir Evening Polytechnic Institute was transformed into the Vladimir Polytechnic Institute (VPI). In 1993, VPI was once again renamed to Vladimir State Technical University (VSTU) .

On December 30, 1996, VSTU was shortened to read Vladimir State University (VSU), marking its change into a university of the classical type. On March 31, 2011, by order of the Minister of Education and Science A. A. Fursenko, Vladimir State University merged with its corresponding university for the Humanities.

== Education offered ==
Since its inception, the university has trained more than 60,000 specialists.

Vladimir State University implements the main educational programs of higher professional education in stages:

- Bachelor's degree - Confirmed once a student has successfully passed the final certification of the program, awarding them the qualification of a "bachelor" (degree);
- Specialization - Confirmed once a student has successfully passed the final certification of the program, awarding them the qualification of a "specialist" (degree);
- Master's degree - Confirmed once a student has successfully passed the final certification of the program, awarding them the qualification of a "master" (degree);
- Training of highly qualified personnel (postgraduate and doctoral studies), awarding students a PhD.

== Branches of the university ==
On the territory of the Vladimir region, there is only one branch:

- Murom Institute (branch) of the Federal State Budgetary Educational Institution of Higher Education "Vladimir State University named after Alexander Grigorievich and Nikolai Grigorievich Stoletovs".

Previously, there was a branch of Vladimir State University in Gus-Khrustalny . On September 1, 2017, it halted all educational activities. Since 2018, this branch has been completely abolished.

== Departments ==
- Institute of Applied Mathematics, Physics and Informatics;
- Institute of Law;
- Institute of Mechanical Engineering and Road Transport;
- Institute of Biology and Ecology;
- Institute of Information Technologies and Radio-electronics;
- Institute of Architecture, Construction and Energy;
- Pedagogical Institute:
- Humanitarian Institute:
- Institute of Economics and Management:
- Institute of Tourism and Entrepreneurship;
- Institute of Arts and Art Education
- Institute of Physical Culture and Sports
- Murom branch
- Center for International Education
- Distance Learning Center (DLC)
- Faculty of pre-university training (since 2006)
- Institute for Advanced Studies and Retraining of Personnel of the VSU.

Reformed (renamed) faculties

- Radio Instrument Engineering Faculty (1964–1971) - divided into radio engineering and instrument engineering faculties.
- Faculty of Radio Engineering (1971–2000) - merged with the Faculty of Instrumentation into the Faculty of Radio-physics, Electronics and Medical Equipment.
- Faculty of Instrumentation (PSF, 1971–2000) - merged with the Faculty of Radio Engineering into the Faculty of Radio-physics, Electronics and Medical Equipment .
- Faculty of Informatics and Applied Mathematics (FIPM) - was divided in January 2006 into faculties of information technology and applied mathematics and physics.
- Faculty of Humanities and Social Sciences (FGSN) - was divided in 2008 into the Faculty of Philosophy and Social Sciences and the Faculty of History.
- Faculty of Law and Psychology (FPP) - was transformed in 2011 into the Law Institute as a result of the merger with the Faculty of Law. The Department of Psychology became part of the Faculty of Psychology of the Humanitarian Institute.
- FREMT (2000–2016) and FIT (2006–2016) are merged into the Institute of Information Technology and Radio-electronics.

== International cooperation ==
The international activities of the VSU are aimed at developing and strengthening international cooperation in the field of educational and research activities in order to improve the quality of education and scientific research, as well as integration into the global scientific and educational system.

== Literature ==
- History of the Faculty of Humanities: On the 45th Anniversary of Vladimir State University. Vladimir: Vladimir. state un-t, 2003. - 36 p. - Vol. 100.
