= Grigoryevo =

Grigoryevo Григорьево
- Selo
- Location within Vladimir Oblast Location within Russia
- Coordinates: 55°30′N 40°57′E
- Country: Russia
- Region: Vladimir Oblast
- District: Gus-Khrustalny District
- Time zone: UTC+3:00

Grigoryevo (Russian: Григорьево) is a rural locality (a selo) and the administrative center of Grigoryevskoye Rural Settlement, Gus-Khrustalny District, Vladimir Oblast, Russia. The population was 586 as of 2010. There are 6 streets.

== Geography ==
Grigoryevo is located 33 km southeast of Gus-Khrustalny (the district's administrative centre) by road. Zakolpye is the nearest rural locality.
