= Shokin =

Shokin (Russian: Шокин) is a Russian masculine surname; its feminine counterpart is Shokina. It may refer to the following notable people:

- Dmitriy Shokin (born 1992), Uzbekistani taekwondo competitor
- Viktor Shokin (born 1952), Ukrainian lawyer and politician

== See also ==
- Shokhin
