= Olga Khokhlova (politician) =

Russian politician (born 1957)

- Ольга Хохлова
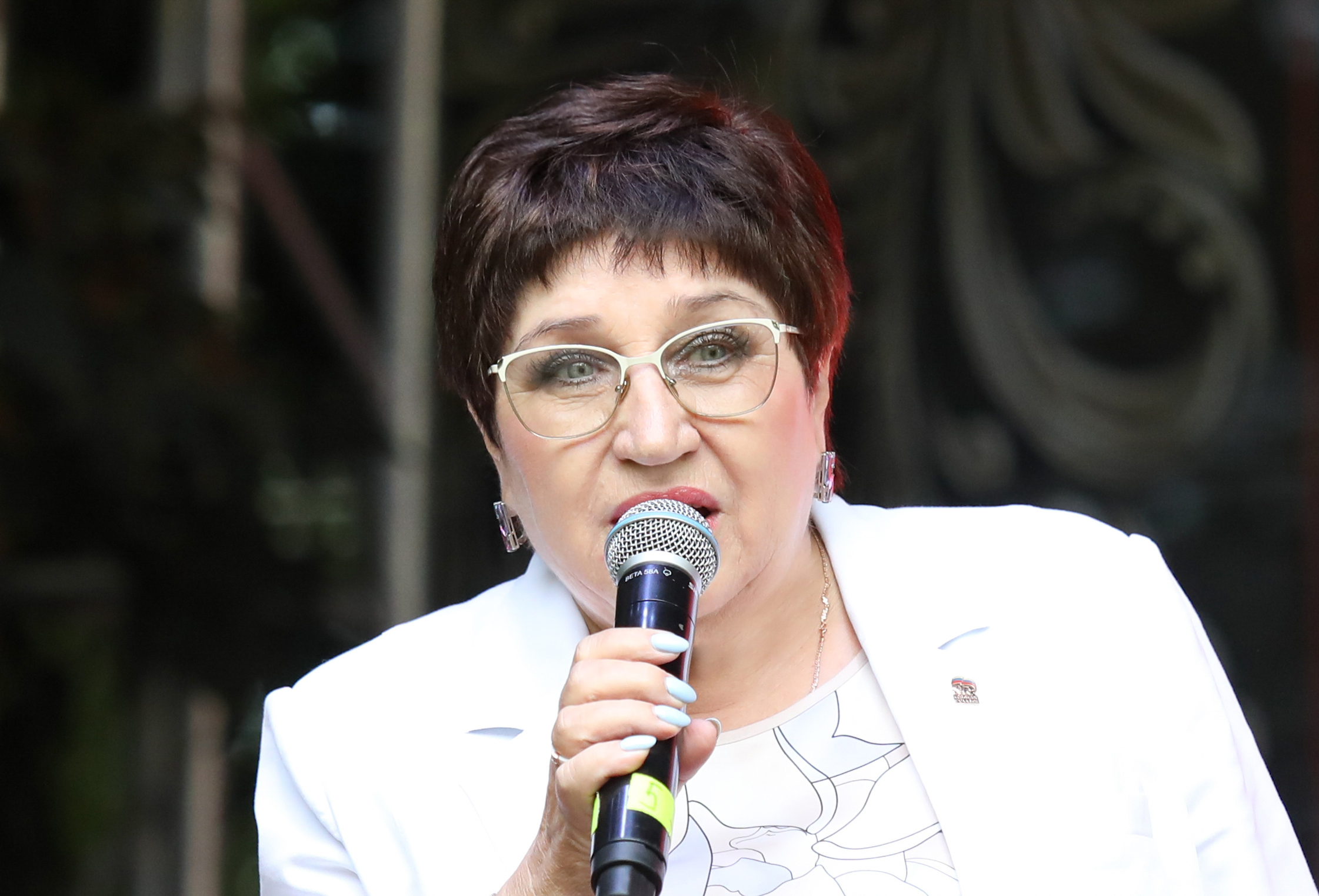

Senator from Vladimir Oblast
- Incumbent
- Assumed office 5 October 2018
- Preceded by: Sergey Rybakov

Personal details
- Born: Olga Khokhlova; 18 November 1957 (age 68) Murom, Vladimir Oblast, Russian Soviet Federative Socialist Republic, Soviet Union
- Party: United Russia
- Education: Vladimir State University for the Humanities

Olga Nikolayevna Khokhlova (Russian: Ольга Николаевна Хохлова; born 18 November 1957) is a Russian politician serving as a senator from Vladimir Oblast since 5 October 2018.

== Biography ==
Olga Khokhlova was born on 18 November 1957 in Murom, Vladimir Oblast. In 1983, she graduated from Vladimir State University for the Humanities. In 1993, she received a degree from the Academy of Labour and Social Relations. Starting from the beginning of the 1980s, she worked as a primary school teacher. From 2000 to 2002, she was the head of the organizational department at the Vladimir branch of the Unity party. On 1 March 2009, Khokhlova was elected deputy of the Legislative Assembly of Vladimir Oblast of the 5th convocation. From 2009 to 2019, she was the Deputy Chairman of the Legislative Assembly. On 5 October 2018, she became the senator from the Legislative Assembly of Vladimir Oblast.

Olga Khokhlova is under personal sanctions introduced by the European Union, the United Kingdom, the USA, Canada, Switzerland, Australia, Ukraine, New Zealand, for ratifying the decisions of the "Treaty of Friendship, Cooperation and Mutual Assistance between the Russian Federation and the Donetsk People's Republic and between the Russian Federation and the Luhansk People's Republic" and providing political and economic support for Russia's annexation of Ukrainian territories.

As of 2021, Khokhlova's annual income amounted to 5,86 million rubles. She declared that she owned two apartments, one house, a 7000-square meters piece of land, and a car.
