= Nikolay Shatov =

Soviet weightlifter

Personal information
- Born: 3 February 1909 Barysaw, Belarus
- Died: 7 March 1992 (aged 83) Moscow, Russia

Sport
- Sport: Weightlifting
- Club: Dynamo
Medal record
Representing Soviet Union
European Weightlifting Championships
Gold medal – first place	1947 Helsinki	Middleweight

Nikolay Ivanovich Shatov (Russian: Николай Иванович Шатов, 3 February 1909 – 7 March 1992) was a Soviet weightlifter who won the 1947 European middleweight title. He was the Soviet champion in the lightweight (1933–1940, 1944) and middleweight (1945–1949) divisions. Between 1936 and 1940 he set eight unofficial world records, in the snatch and in the total.

In retirement Shatov trained the Soviet weightlifting team, preparing it for the 1952 and 1956 Summer Olympics. Between 1950 and 1962 he headed the Soviet Weightlifting Federation.

Shatov fought in World War II. He died in 1992 and was survived by his wife Anna.
