= Svetlana Orlova (politician) =

Russian politician

- Светлана Орлова
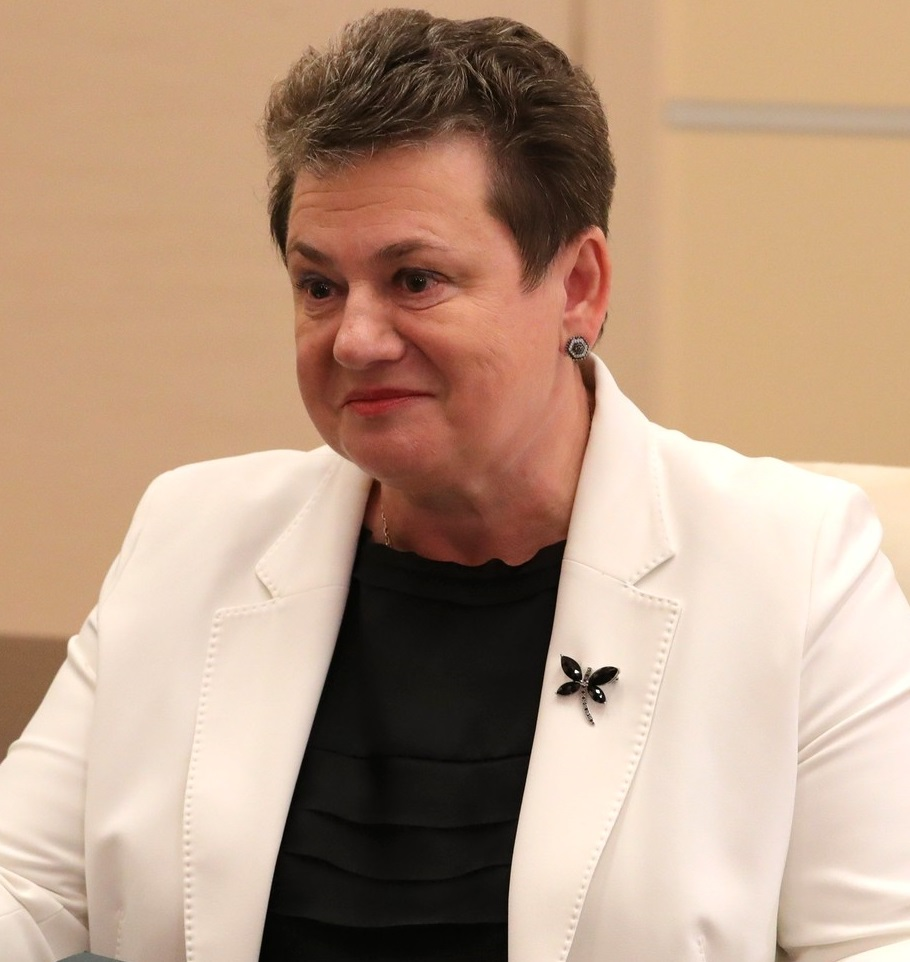
- Orlova in 2018

Auditor of the Accounts Chamber of Russia
- Incumbent
- Assumed office 23 November 2018
- Preceded by: Bato-Zhargal Zhambalnimbuyev

Governor of Vladimir Oblast
- In office 23 September 2013 – 8 October 2018
- Preceded by: Nikolay Vinogradov
- Succeeded by: Vladimir Sipyagin

Governor of Vladimir Oblast (acting)
- In office 24 March 2013 – 23 September 2013

Deputy Chairman of the Federation Council
- In office 14 January 2004 – 24 March 2013
- Preceded by: Andrey Bikharev
- Succeeded by: Yevgeny Bushmin

Russian Federation Senator from Kemerovo Oblast
- In office 24 November 2001 – 17 September 2013
- Succeeded by: Sergey Shatirov

Member of the State Duma
- In office 11 January 1994 – 18 January 2000
- Constituency: Arsenyev (1995–2000)

Personal details
- Born: Svetlana Yuryevna Pavlova; 23 October 1954 (age 71) Obluchye, RSFSR, Soviet Union
- Party: United Russia
- Other political affiliations: Women of Russia
- Education: Ussuriysk State Pedagogical Institute

Svetlana Yuryevna Orlova (Russian: Светлана Юрьевна Орлова; born 23 October 1954), is a Russian politician, who is currently the auditor of the Accounts Chamber of Russia since 23 November 2018.

She served as the governor of Vladimir Oblast from 2013 to 2018. She is known for losing in the second round of the governor's elections in 2018, losing 37.46% and 57.03%, respectively, to the candidate of the Liberal Democratic Party of Russia, Vladimir Sipyagin.

In the past, she was the deputy chairman of the Federation Council from 2004 to 2013, and a member of the State Duma of the 1st and 2nd convocations from 1993 to 2000. From 2012 to 2018, she was a member of the Bureau of the Supreme Council of the United Russia party. On the basis of the decision taken by the delegates of the XVIII Congress of the "United Russia" party held on 7–8 December 2018, she was expelled from the Supreme Council of the party.

== Biography ==
Svetlana Orlova was born on 23 October 1954 in the city of Obluchye, Jewish Autonomous Oblast, in the family of a diesel locomotive driver. She graduated from secondary school No. 70 in Obluchye (now - MBOU "Secondary school No. 3 of the city of Obluchye named after Hero of the Soviet Union Yu. V. Tvarkovsky").

In 1977, she graduated from the Ussuriysk State Pedagogical Institute with a degree in philologist. After graduation, she was assigned to boarding school No. 2 in Vladivostok, which at that time was headed by the innovative teacher Nikolay Dubinin; worked at a boarding school as a pioneer leader and educator.

In 1979, Orlova moved to work in the organs of the CPSU, where until 1990 she held the positions of an instructor of the Soviet District Committee of the party, as head of the department of the Frunzensky District Council, and head of the sector of the Primorsky Regional Committee of the CPSU for physical culture and sports.

From 1990 to 1993, she was the Vice President, General Director of the Primorsk Regional Women's Commercial Charitable Organization LLP "ANNA" in Vladivostok, which opened a training center for retraining and a tourist center and published, together with the Regional Council, a newspaper for women "Anna".

In 1991, she graduated from the Khabarovsk Higher Party School, courses for women entrepreneurs at the Academy of National Economy under the Government of Russia.

=== Work in Moscow ===
In the 1993 parliamentary election, Orlova was elected a member of the State Duma of the 1st convocation on the federal list of the "Women of Russia" political movement. She was a member of the State Duma Committee on Budget, Taxes, Banks and Finance, a member of the Women of Russia faction.

In 1995, with the electoral association "Women of Russia", Orlova was nominated as a candidate for the State Duma in the Arsenyevsky single-mandate constituency No. 49 of the Primorsky Krai. She won the election with 25% of the vote.

In 1998, Prime Minister Sergei Kiriyenko offered Orlova the post of chairman of the State Committee for Fisheries of the Russia, however she refused, as she ran for governor of the Primorsky Krai, but was removed from registration in 1999 for not entering information about an apartment in Moscow in the income statement and plot of land in the suburbs, recorded on her husband.

When Yevgeny Nazdratenko was governor of the Primorsky Krai in from 1993 to 2001, she was known as his opponent.

From 2000 to 2001, she was the Vice President of CJSC NPO Krosna, engaged in satellite communications and digital technologies.

In November 2001, she was elected a member of the Federation Council from the Council of People's Deputies of the Kemerovo Oblast, on the initiative of Aman Tuleyev, with whom Orlova had repeatedly met in the budget committee of the State Duma when discussing financial issues of the Kemerovo Oblast. This was done despite the fact that nothing is known about her in Kuzbass, and she never visited the region as a public politician. The chairman of the Kemerovo Regional Council, Gennady Dyudyaev, explained that with the election of a "non-native Kuzbass member" the region can only win: "We need a person there who can enter different corridors of power ... At one time, some deputies already had to turn to Orlova for help."

In January 2004, Orlova was elected Deputy Chairperson of the Federation Council. She became a member of the Federation Council Budget Committee. She was the plenipotentiary representative of the Federation Council in the State Duma, in the Commission of the Government of the Russian Federation on legislative activity. She represented the Federation Council in coordination and advisory bodies under the President of the Russia, the Government of Russian, with federal executive bodies.

In 2005, at the Plekhanov Russian Academy of Economics, Orlova defended her Ph.D. thesis on "Taxes in the mechanism of state regulation of investments in Russia" and received a Ph.D. degree in economics. Opponents questioned her authorship, since she spent record time writing and defending such a voluminous work.

In the "United Russia" faction, Orlova was the curator of the infamous program of "Clean Water", with Viktor Petrik.

She was a former member of the Bureau of the Supreme Council of United Russia. She was the Chairman of the Commission of the Presidium of the General Council of the party for the consideration of complaints of citizens expelled from the party members.

=== Governor of Vladimir Oblast ===
On 24 March 2013, by the decree of the President of Russia, Orlova was appointed acting Governor of the Vladimir Oblast.

On 8 September 2013, she won the gubernatorial elections, receiving 74.73% of the vote. On 23 September 2013, she officially took office as governor.

From 10 November 2015 to 6 April 2016, she was the member of the Presidium of the State Council of Russia.

On a single voting day, 9 September 2018, she won 36.42% of the votes cast in the elections and entered the second round with LDPR candidate Vladimir Sipyagin. The second round of elections took place on 23 September. Three days before the second round of elections, Orlova asked for support from the population and partially admitted the mistakes of her activities as governor of the Vladimir Oblast. She lost the elections with 37.46%, as Sipyagin got 57.03%.

Her term ended on 8 October 2018, the day of Sipyagin's inauguration.

=== Auditor of the Accounts Chamber ===
On 23 November 2018, the Federation Council appointed Orlova as auditor of the Accounts Chamber of Russia.

On the basis of the decision taken by the delegates of the XVIII Congress of the political party "United Russia" held on 7–8 December 2018, Orlova was expelled from the Supreme Council of the party.

== Other positions ==
Orlova was also on the Presidium of the General Council of "the United Russia" party, and a member of the regional political council of the Kemerovo regional branch of the party. She was the Chairman of the Commission of the Presidium of the General Council of the Party for consideration of complaints of citizens expelled from the party members, Chairman of the Commission of the Presidium of the General Council of the Party for interaction with public associations of the production sector.

She is also Vice-Chairman of the Bureau of the Congress of Local and Regional Authorities of the Council of Europe (nominated by the largest political faction of the Congress - "European People's Party / Christian Democrats"). She also leads the Russian delegation to the Congress of Local and Regional Authorities of the Council of Europe.

== Criticism ==
The politician and businessman Mikhail Prokhorov accused Orlova of the fact that, at her request, Alexander Filippov, a competitor from the Civic Platform, was forcefully removed from the gubernatorial elections; a case was also initiated against Filippov's father. Prokhorov also believes that Orlova initiated the registration for the elections of Civic Position, a spoiler party similar in name and symbolism to Civic Platform, as well as the nomination of Filippov's namesake from this party.

The Russian press, both federal and directly from the Vladimir Oblast, often criticized Orlova for a mass of election promises that she did not fulfill when she became governor. In particular, in 2013, Orlova stated that "there will be no garbage from the Moscow region in the Vladimir region." However, she subsequently supported the concept of building a waste processing plant in the Kirzhachsky district of the region, which was supposed to receive, among other things, waste from the housing renovation program operating in Moscow. This concept met with strong opposition from the residents of the area, ecologists and scientists.

The media note Orlova's love for exaggerating her own merits: the governor rounds up and does it only in her favor. For example, she stated that 37 schools would be built by 2025, although only 24 were listed in the construction plan. Another time she reported that 4,000 residents were relocated from the emergency fund, in fact only 3382.

Former Senator Konstantin Dobrynin wrote that “Orlova was known in the Federation Council as a 'flapper'. She always clapped a lot, furiously, but most importantly: she always started clapping first. The secret was simple: when the president did not have time to finish the thought, she already raised her elbows to chest level, spread her arms and began to clap her hands. Precisely to beat - do not clap. Sometimes accompanied by loud shouts of "Bravo!" Or "Right!" The most important thing was to get noticed. And the president noticed."

In one of her speeches, she lamented that "America has not yet paid off the Lend-Lease."

== Family ==
She is married, has a son and three grandchildren.

Her husband, Viktor, in the past a sea captain, heads the NP "Unipartnermarin".

Her son, Vladimi (born 1979), is a graduate of Moscow State University, who worked in the tax police, from 2003 to 2008, an employee of the Department of Economic Security of the Ministry of Internal Affairs of Russia, and a police captain. According to press reports, Vladimir, together with his colleagues in the Ministry of Internal Affairs, was involved in the illegal confiscation of goods from entrepreneurs in the 2000s and their subsequent sale. Journalist Irek Murtazin claims that Vladimir Orlov was the actual leader of the police "brigade" that ruined the Lithuanian businessman. After the Ministry of Internal Affairs, Orlov worked as an advisor to the general director of the Olympstroy corporation, but resigned from it of his own free will.

== Hobbies ==
In her free time she plays tennis. During public events, she repeatedly declared her love for singing.
