= Andrey Shokhin =

Russian politician (born 1961)

- Андрей Шохин
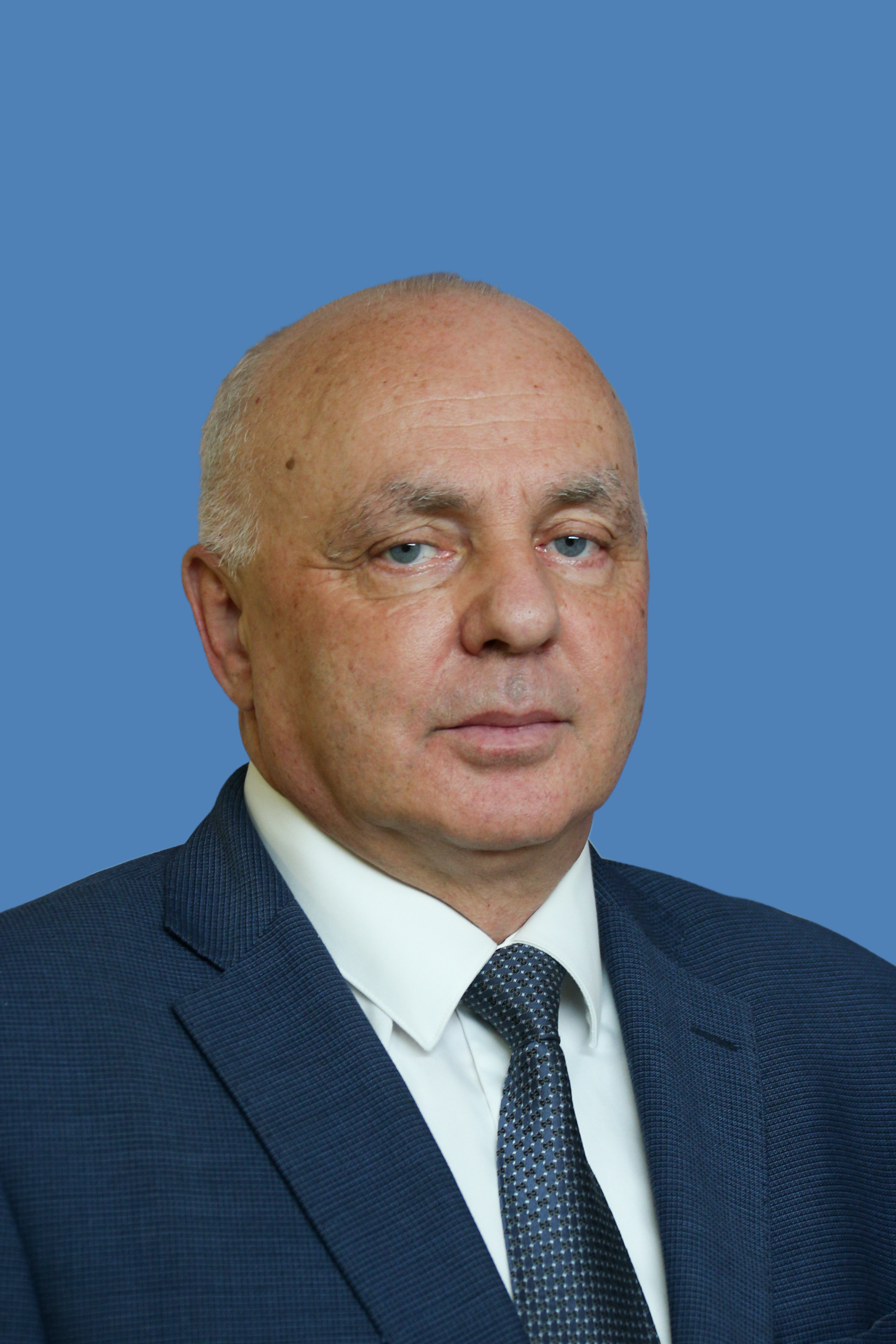

Senator from Vladimir Oblast
- Incumbent
- Assumed office 20 September 2022
- Preceded by: Alexander Pronyushkin

Personal details
- Born: Andrey Shokhin; 5 October 1961 (age 64) Vladimir, Russian Soviet Federative Socialist Republic, Soviet Union
- Party: United Russia
- Education: Vladimir State University for the Humanities

Andrey Stanislavovich Shokhin (Russian: Андрей Станиславович Шохин; born 5 October 1961) is a Russian politician serving as a senator from Vladimir Oblast since 20 September 2022.

== Career ==
Andrey Shokhin was born on 5 October 1961 in Vladimir. In 1984, he graduated from the Vladimir State University for the Humanities. Afterward, he worked a teacher of physics in the high school. From 1989 to 2005, he held senior positions in commercial structures. In 2002, he was elected deputy of the Congress of People's Deputies of Russia of the Vladimir city. From 2005 to 2010, he was the Deputy Mayor of Vladimir. On 20 September 2022, he became the senator from the Vladimir Oblast.

== Sanctions ==
Andrey Shokhin is under personal sanctions introduced by the European Union, the United Kingdom, the United States, Canada, Switzerland, Australia, Ukraine, New Zealand, for ratifying the decisions of the "Treaty of Friendship, Cooperation and Mutual Assistance between the Russian Federation and the Donetsk People's Republic and between the Russian Federation and the Luhansk People's Republic" and providing political and economic support for Russia's annexation of Ukrainian territories.
