= Aleksandr Avdeyev (politician, born 1975) =

Russian politician

- Александр Авдеев
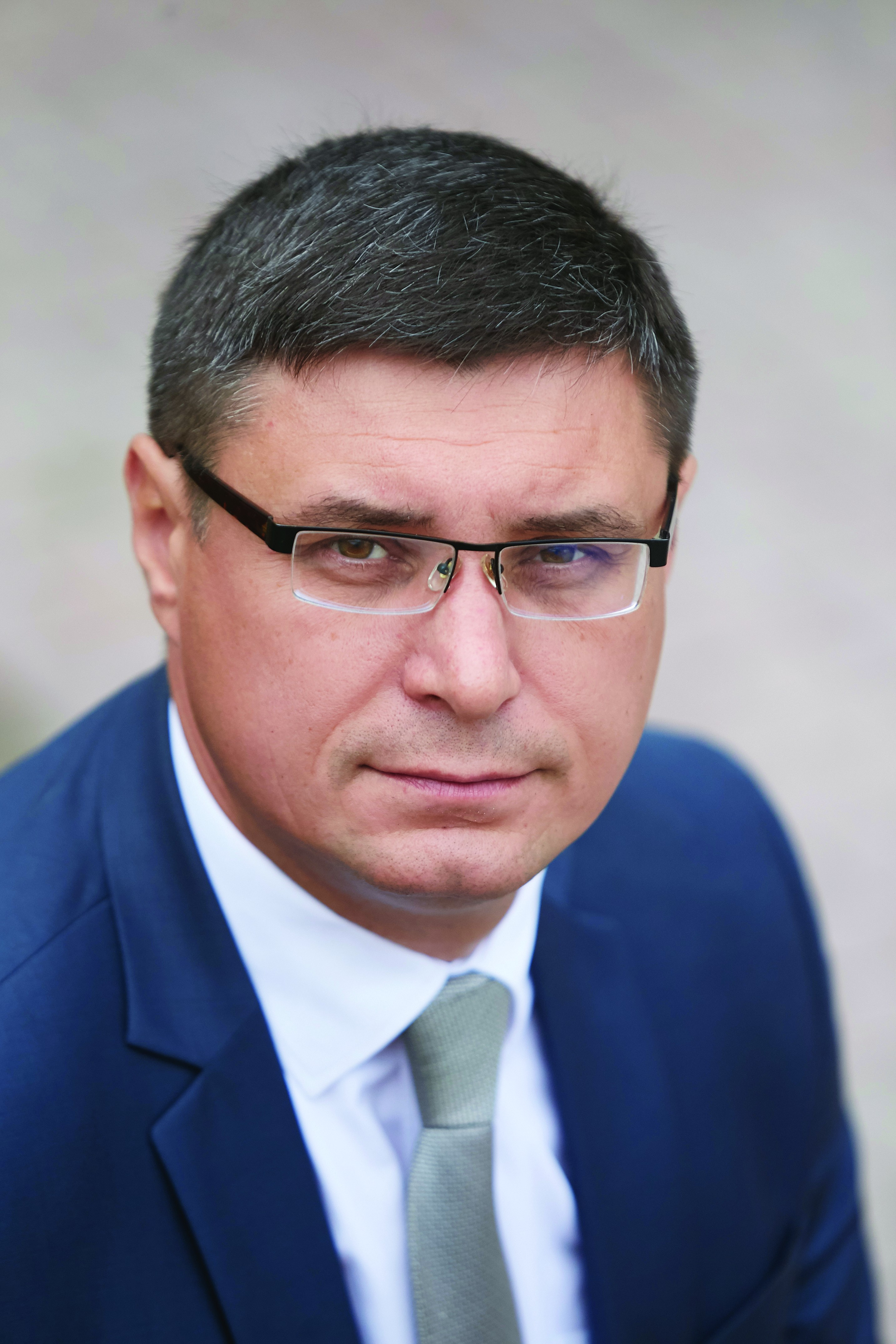
- Official portrait, 2019

5th Governor of Vladimir Oblast
- Incumbent
- Assumed office 4 October 2021 (acting until 16 September 2022)
- Preceded by: Vladimir Sipyagin

Member of the State Duma
- In office 5 October 2016 – 14 October 2021
- Succeeded by: Yury Petrov

Deputy Governor of Kaluga Oblast
- In office November 2015 – 18 September 2016
- Governor: Anatoly Artamonov

Deputy Governor of the Kaluga Oblast - Head of the Administration of the Governor of Kaluga Oblast
- In office 18 September 2015 – November 2015
- Preceded by: Nikolay Lyubimov
- Succeeded by: Aleksandr Nikitenko

Mayor of Obninsk
- In office 29 June 2010 – 18 September 2015
- Preceded by: Nikolai Shubin
- Succeeded by: Vladislav Shapsha

Personal details
- Born: 12 August 1975 (age 50) Kaluga, Soviet Union
- Political party: United Russia
- Education: Moscow State Technical University; MIRBIS; RANEPA

Aleksandr Aleksandrovich Avdeyev (Russian: Александр Александрович Авдеев; born 12 August 1975), is a Russian statesman and politician, who is currently the 5th Governor of Vladimir Oblast since 16 September 2022.

He had previously served as a deputy of the State Duma of the VII convocation from 2016 to 2021, and as the Deputy Governor of Kaluga Oblast, and member of the Government of Kaluga Oblast from 2015 to 2016. He was Mayor of Obninsk from 2010 to 2015. He is a member of the United Russia party.

Due to the Russian invasion of Ukraine, Canada imposed sanctions on Avdeev in August 2022.

== Biography ==
Aleksandr Avdeyev was born on 12 August 1975 in Kaluga to a family of workers at the Kaluga Turbine Plant. His father later moved up the party line. Aleksandr Avdeyev studied at school number 17. He graduated from the Kaluga branch of the Moscow State Technical University. He also graduated from the Bauman University - Faculty of Mechanical Engineering in 1998, specializing in Mechanical Engineer. In 1999, he graduated from the Faculty of Economics of the same university with a degree in Economist-Manager.

In 1999, Avdeyev joined the State Small Business Support Fund of the Kaluga Oblast as a financial analyst. From 2003 to 2004, he was trained under the President's program for the training of management personnel at the Moscow International Higher School of Business. From 2001 to 2006, he was a financial analyst, and then the head of the financial and analytical department at the Elikor Group. He also graduated from the Russian Presidential Academy of National Economy and Public Administration in 2010.

On 13 March 2010, Avdeyev became a Deputy Head of the Obninsk City Administration for Economic Development. On 29 June 2010, by the decision of the Obninsk City Council, Adveyev was appointed as the Mayor of Obninsk. On 19 September 2015, Avdeyev resigned as the mayor of Obninsk, and was replaced by Vladislav Shapsha. The same year in September, Avdeyev served as Deputy Governor of Kaluga Oblast - as the head of the Administration of the Governor of Kaluga Oblast, and from November 2015 to September 2016, he was the Deputy Governor of Kaluga Oblast.

On 18 September 2016, Avdeyev was elected as member of parliament, a deputy of the State Duma of the VII convocation, in the Kaluga single-mandate constituency No. 99, representing the United Russia party. On 4 October 2021, Russian President Vladimir Putin appointed Avdeyev as acting governor of Vladimir Oblast.

== Legislative activity ==
During the term of office of the State Duma deputy, from 2016 to 2019, Avdeyev co-authored 10 legislative initiatives and amendments to draft federal laws.

== Awards ==
- Medal "For special services to the Kaluga Oblast" of II and III degrees.

== Personal life ==
Avdeyev prefers active forms of recreation. He is fond of football, basketball, swimming, windsurfing, winter and summer fishing. In his youth, he was a metal worker. His favorite music groups are Metallica, Nirvana, Scorpions, Megadeth, Aria, Kino, Mashina Vremeni, and Kalinov Most. His favorite books are The Lord of the Rings, and Atlas Shrugged. He enjoys travelling, and eating seafood.

== Family ==
Avdeyev is married to Svetlana Vyacheslavovna Avdeyeva, who works as a bank employee. The couple have children.
