= Legislative Assembly of Vladimir Oblast =

Regional parliament of Vladimir Oblast, Russia

Legislative Assembly of Vladimir Oblast Законодательное собрание Владимирской области
- 8th legislature

Type
- Type: Unicameral

Leadership
- Chairman: Vladimir Kiselyov, United Russia since 18 March 2009

Structure
- Seats: 40
- Political groups: United Russia (35) CPRF (2); LDPR (1); SRZP (1) RPPSJ (1)

Elections
- Voting system: Mixed
- Last election: 8-10 September 2023
- Next election: 2028

Meeting place
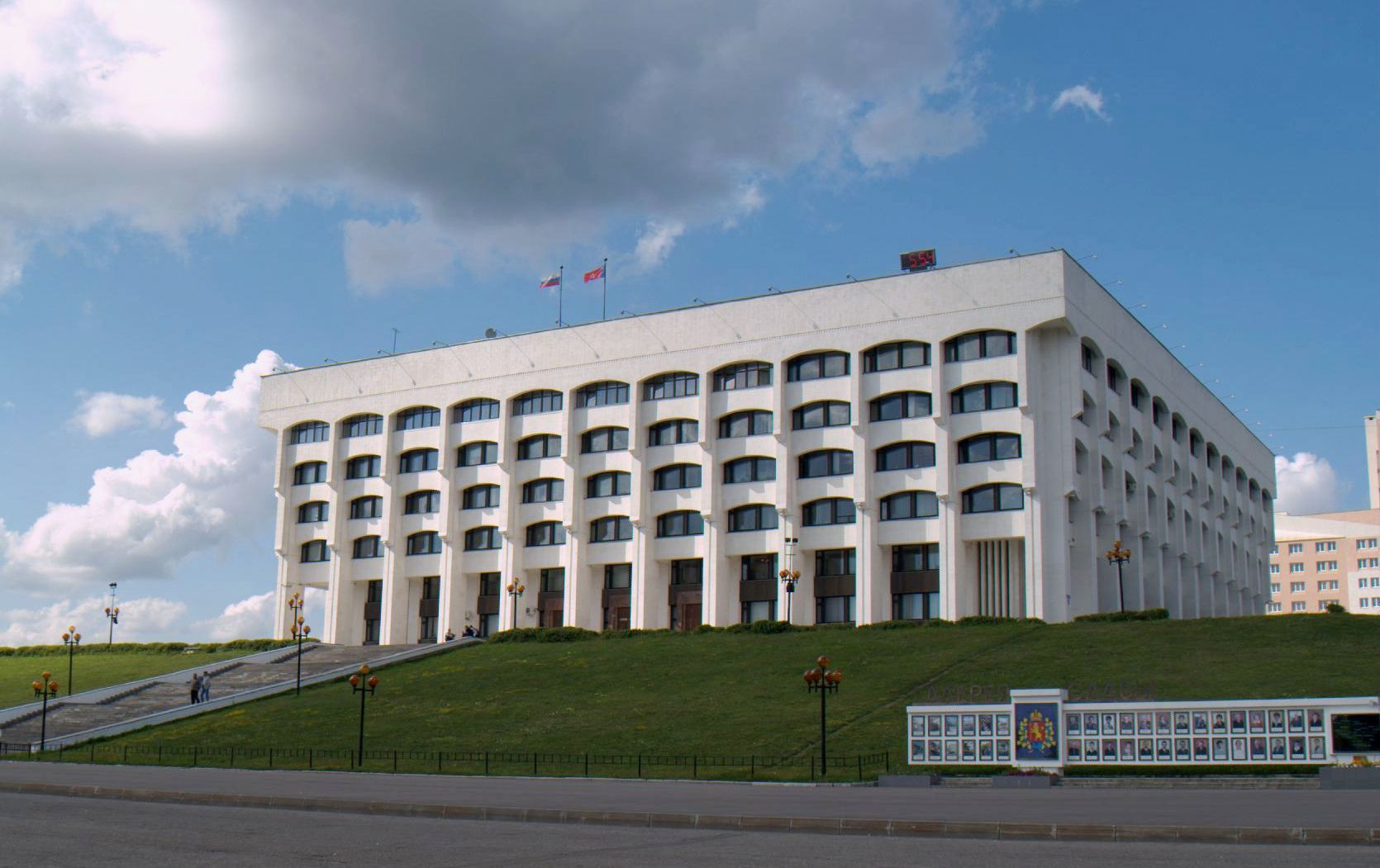
- 21 Oktyabrsky Prospekt, Vladimir

Website
- zsvo.ru

The Legislative Assembly of Vladimir Oblast (Russian: Законодательное собрание Владимирской области, romanized: Zakonodatel'noe sobranie Vladimirskoy oblasti) is the regional parliament of Vladimir Oblast, a federal subject of Russia. A total of 40 deputies are elected for five-year terms.

== Elections ==
=== 2018 ===
Party	%	Seats
United Russia	29.57	23
Communist Party of the Russian Federation	23.66	7
Liberal Democratic Party of Russia	20.80	4
A Just Russia	10.20	3
Russian Party of Freedom and Justice	6.14	1
Yabloko	1.42	0
Registered voters/turnout	32.90	

=== 2023 ===
Party	%	Seats
United Russia	55.47	35
Communist Party of the Russian Federation	14.02	2
Liberal Democratic Party of Russia	10.39	1
A Just Russia	6.63	1
Party of Pensioners	6.06	1
New People	4.83	0
Invalid ballots	2.59	
Registered voters/turnout	24.73	
