= Vladimir Oblast =

First-level administrative division of Russia

Vladimir Oblast Владимирская область (Russian)
- Oblast
- Flag Coat of arms
- Anthem: Anthem of Vladimir Oblast (Unofficial)
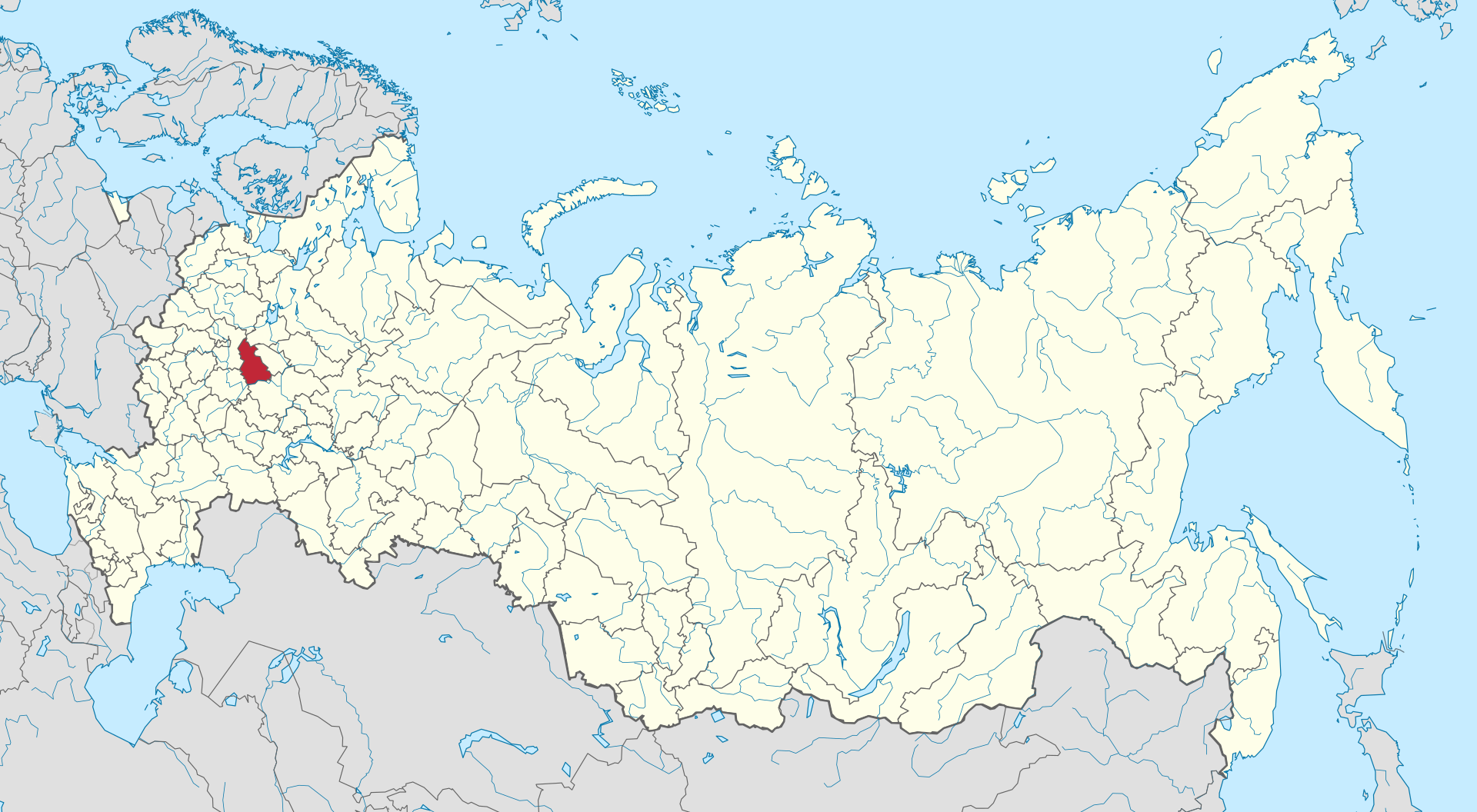
- Coordinates: 56°05′N 40°37′E
- Country: Russia
- Federal district: Central
- Economic region: Central
- Established: August 14, 1944
- Administrative center: Vladimir

Government
  - Body: Legislative Assembly
  - Governor: Sergey Volkov (acting)

Area
  - Total: 29,084 km^{2} (11,229 sq mi)
  - Rank: 66th

Population (2021 census)
  - Total: 1,348,134
  - Estimate (2018): 1,378,337
  - Rank: 33rd
  - Density: 46.353/km^{2} (120.05/sq mi)
  - Urban: 77.6%
  - Rural: 22.4%

GDP (nominal, 2024)
  - Total: ₽969 billion (US$11.37 billion)
  - Per capita: ₽743,499 (US$8,724.36)
- Time zone: UTC+3 (MSK)
- ISO 3166 code: RU-VLA
- License plates: 33
- OKTMO ID: 17000000
- Official languages: Russian
- Website: http://www.avo.ru

Vladimir Oblast (Russian: Влади́мирская о́бласть, romanized: Vladimirskaya oblastʹ) is a federal subject of Russia (an oblast). Its administrative center is the city of Vladimir, which is located 190 kilometers (120 mi) east of Moscow. As of the 2010 Census, the oblast's population was 1,443,693.

The UNESCO World Heritage List includes the 12th-century cathedrals of Vladimir, Suzdal, Bogolyubovo, and Kideksha.

== Geography ==
Vladimir Oblast borders Moscow, Yaroslavl, Ivanovo, Ryazan, and Nizhny Novgorod Oblasts. The oblast is situated in the center of the East European Plain. The Klyazma and the Oka are the most important rivers. There are approximately three hundred lakes in the oblast. The oblast is situated in a zone of mixed forests. The region's geology is characterized by a variety of sedimentary and igneous rocks, including sandstone, shale, limestone, granite, and diabase. There are also several mineral deposits in the oblast, including iron ore, apatite, and phosphate. Some notable natural landmarks in the oblast include the Klyazma Reservoir and the Suzdal Kremlin, which is a UNESCO World Heritage site. Additionally, there are several nature reserves and parks in the oblast, such as the Meshchyora National Park and the Ugra National Park.

=== Fauna ===
The oblast's fauna currently includes more than fifty species of mammals (some examples including elk, brown bear, wild boar, roe deer, red and sika deer, lynx, wolf, squirrel, rabbit, marten, fox, weasel, badger and other fur-bearing animals), five species of reptiles, and ten species of amphibians. The semiaquatic Russian desman is listed in the Russian Red Book of endangered species. The region is inhabited by 216 species of birds, among which are the capercaillie, black grouse, grouse, partridge, woodcock, goose, duck, etc. The lesser white-fronted goose is listed in the Red Book.

Hunting season runs from October to February with the following license and permit restrictions:

- Elk, wild boar, red deer, and sika deer from mid-November through mid-January
- Hare from October through January
- Grouse, black grouse, woodcock, duck and goose for 10 days in April.

Bodies of water in the region are rich in numerous species (about 40) of fresh-water fish (e.g. eel, roach, pike, perch, bream, rudd, and sturgeon in the Klyazma River), which support ice fishing in winter. Additionally, the oblast has several hunting farms.

=== Hydrography ===
The total expanse of the oblast's surface waters is 32.9 hectares.

The region has hundreds of rivers with a total length of more than 8.6 million kilometers—there are 560 rivers and streams throughout the oblast. The Klyazma River flows into the Oka River on the south-eastern edge of the oblast's border with the Nizhny Novgorod Region. The Klyazma River's major tributaries in the Vladimir Region are the Sherna (with the Molokcha flowing into it), the Kirzhach (with its own tributaries being the Big and Small Kirzhach), the Peksha, the Koloksha, the Nerl, the Sudogda, the Uvod, the Lukh and the Suvorosch. Tributaries of the Oka within Vladimir oblast are the Gus, Unzha, and Ushna rivers. The Dubna River, a tributary of the Volga River, originates near the town of Alexandrov. The Oka River is navigable throughout the region (157 km). The rivers in the region are characterized by their flat currents, broad valleys and meandering channels. Water levels are characterized by their high spring tides, low water periods over summer-autumn with occasional flooding during heavy rains, and stable/low levels throughout the winter.

There are about three hundred lakes covering an area of five thousand hectares. Most of them are small and undrained and many are overgrown with a peat layer. The origin of the lakes varies. Numerous oxbow lakes are scattered along the river valleys. The largest of them are Lake Urvanovskoe (12 km long) and Lake Visha (length about 10 km). In the Meshchera Lowlands and in the northwest of the oblast are lakes of ancient alluvial valleys: Isikhry, Svyatoe and others. Lakes of karst origin, located in the lower reaches of the Klyazma and in the center of Vyaznikovsky District (a northeastern district in the oblast), have highly mineralized water and are associated with underground watercourses. The largest and deepest of them is Lake Kshchara. In the districts of Alexandrov and Yuryev-Polsky glacial lakes are small in size.

The main masses of wetlands in the region (total area of 37.4 thousand hectares) occur in Meshchera and Balakhna (in the northeast of the oblast) lowlands.

=== Climate ===
Vladimir Oblast has a humid continental climate. The region experiences a significant temperature range between day and night during the summer months, which can lead to frequent thunderstorms.

The oblast receives an average of 600–700 millimeters of precipitation annually, with most of it falling in the summer months. Snowfall is common in the winter months, with an average of 50–60 centimeters (20–24 inches) of snowfall per year.

The climate of Vladimir Oblast is influenced by its location in the center of the East European Plain and its distance from the ocean. The oblast is situated far from any major bodies of water, which means that it experiences a greater temperature range and less moderating effects from maritime air masses than regions closer to the coast. However, the region is also shielded from harsh arctic air masses by the Ural Mountains, which lie to the east.

== History ==
The territory of modern Vladimir Oblast has been populated since ancient times. The oldest known traces of human settlement date to the Upper Paleolithic. A settlement of Homo Sapiens dating back to between 32,050 BC and 28,550 BC was discovered in the area of Sungir, located around 200 km east of Moscow.

The region of Vladimir were inhabited by different people like Slavs, Tatars, Finno-Ugrics and Balts. The East Slavic tribe of the Buzhans originated in the Vladimir region. Archaeological excavations of Volga Finn settlements document also the Finno-Ugric roots of this land. Merya, Muromian, and Meshchera are inhabited territory of the region during this period.

Since the 10th century AD, Slavic colonization of the area began in Murom and Suzdal. The current territory of Vladimir Oblast became part of Kievan Rus. After the breakdown of the authority of Kievan Rus, the region became part of the Rostov-Suzdal principality in the 11th century and then the Vladimir-Suzdal principality in the 12th century. Vladimir region rapidly developed in the mid-12th century during the rule of Yuri Dolgorukiy and Andrey Bogolyubsky. New townships arose—Yuriev-Polsky, Yaropolch-Zalessky, Gorokhovets, Starodub-on-the-Klyazma, Mstislavl—along with princely residences in Kideksha and Bogolyubovo.

The Vladimir Highway, a pre-modern civilian road that has been in use since at least the 14th century, traverses the region, bringing people between Moscow and Nizhny Novgorod.

Most, if not all, of modern Vladimir, during the Soviet period, seems to have been part of Ivanovo Oblast until it became a separate Federal Subject on 14 August 1944.

== Politics ==
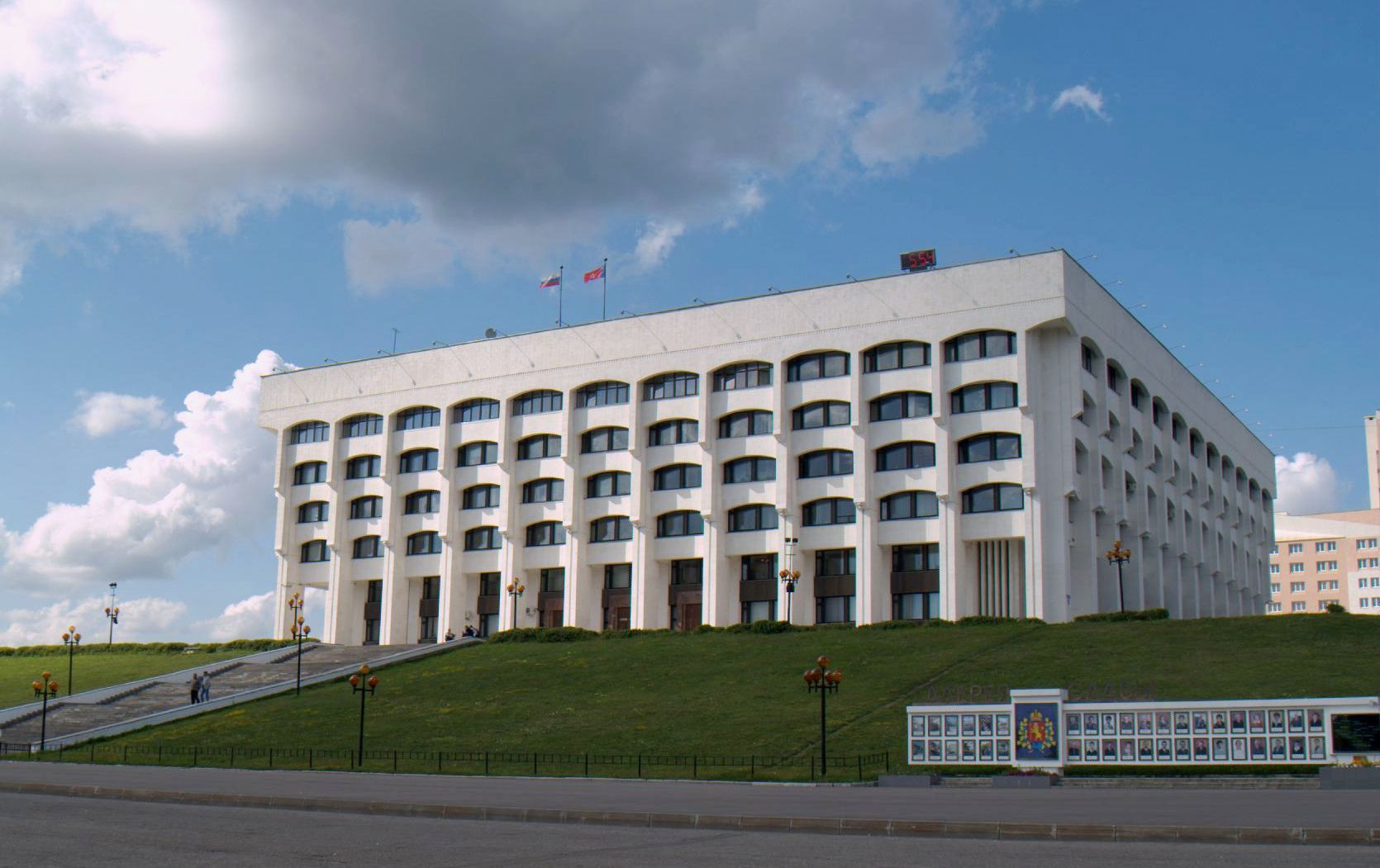
Legislative Assembly of Vladimir Oblast, 2009

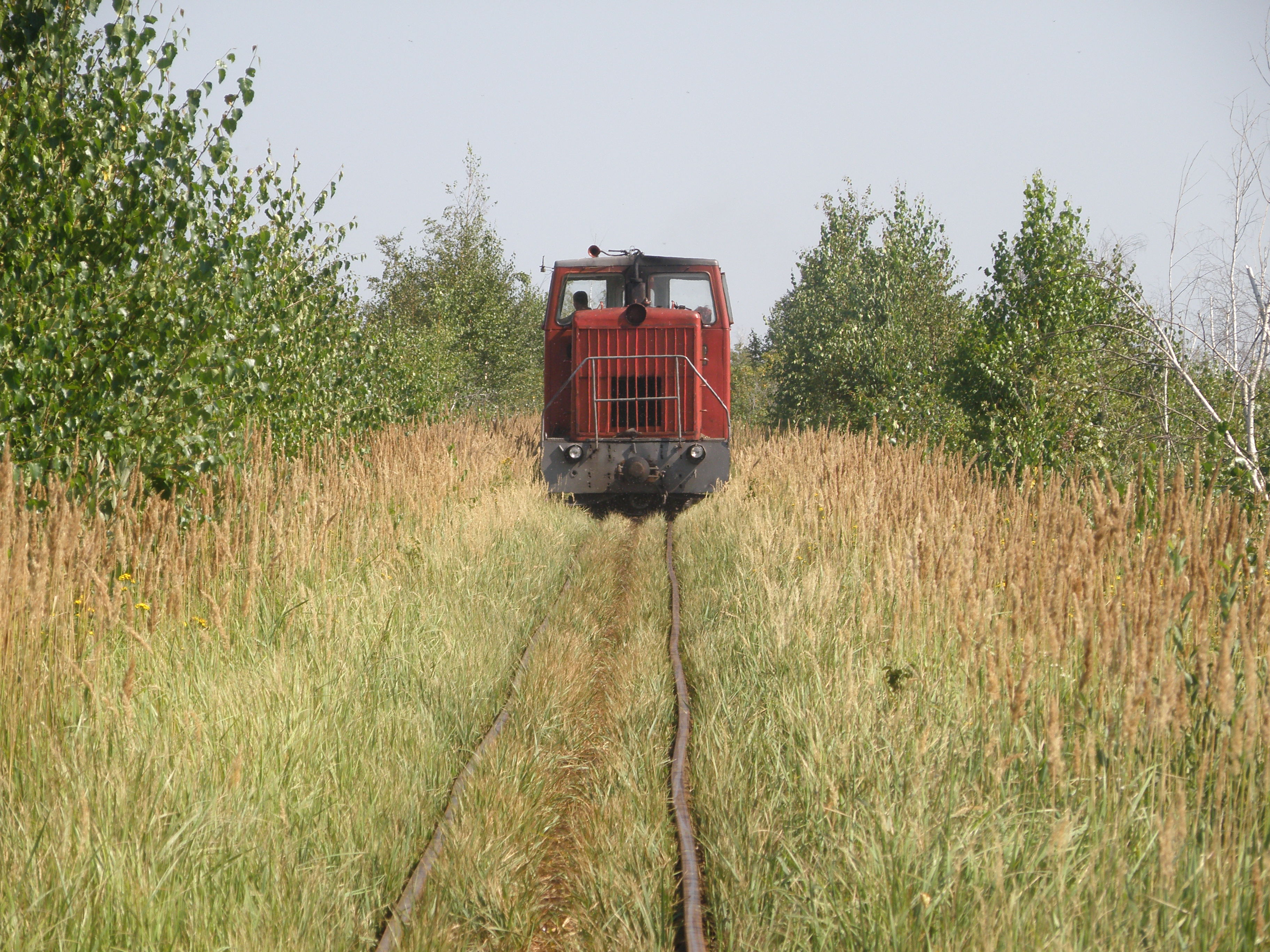
Gusevskoye peat narrow gauge railway, 2012

During the Soviet period, the high authority in the oblast was shared between three persons: The first secretary of the Vladimir CPSU Committee (who in reality had the greatest authority), the chairman of the oblast Soviet (legislative power), and the chairman of the oblast Executive Committee (executive power). Since 1991, CPSU lost all the power, and the head of the Oblast administration, and eventually the governor was appointed/elected alongside elected regional parliament.

The Charter of Vladimir Oblast is the fundamental law of the region. The current Charter was accepted by the Legislative Assembly of Vladimir Oblast on 14 August 2001.

=== Legislative branch ===
The Legislative Assembly of Vladimir Oblast is the province's standing legislative (representative) body. The Legislative Assembly exercises its authority by passing laws, resolutions, and other legal acts and by supervising the implementation and observance of the laws and other legal acts passed by it.

The current 6th convocation was elected in the elections on 8 September 2013 under a mixed system (19 deputies were elected in single-mandate constituencies, 19 on the lists of political parties). Most of the seats are held by United Russia - 32, the Communist Party - 3, the Liberal Democratic Party - 2, A Just Russia - 1. Vladimir Kiselyov (United Russia) was elected Chairman of the Legislative Assembly. On 17 August 2015, Deputy Sergei Kuryshyov (United Russia), who was sentenced to five and a half years in a colony-settlement for a fatal accident while drunk, was prematurely deprived of his mandate.

=== Executive branch ===
The highest executive body is the Oblast Government, which includes territorial executive bodies such as district administrations, committees, and commissions that facilitate development and run the day to day matters of the province. The Oblast administration supports the activities of the Governor who is the highest official and acts as guarantor of the observance of the oblast Charter in accordance with the Constitution of Russia.

The governor is elected by citizens of the Russian Federation residing in the territory of the Vladimir Oblast and possessing active suffrage based on universal, equal, and direct suffrage by secret ballot for a term of 5 years. Since October 2021, the position has been occupied by Aleksandr Avdeyev, having also won the 2022 Vladimir Oblast gubernatorial election.

=== Judicial branch ===
Judicial power is exercised by the federal courts, the Vladimir Oblast Court, the Arbitration Court of the Vladimir Oblast, and the Justices of the Peace of the Vladimir Oblast.

=== Representatives in the Federal Assembly ===
Like every federal subject, the Federation Council of the Vladimir Oblast has two representatives: one from the legislative assembly and one from the republic's government.

Representative	Branch of power	Appointee	Position (at the time of nomination)	Term of office	Position in the Federation Council
Olga Khokhlova	legislative	26 deputies legislative assembly of the 7th convocation, elected in the 2018 elections	Deputy of the Legislative Assembly of the Vladimir Oblast of the 5th and 6th convocations, United Russia	5 years, from 5 October 2018 to September 2023	member of the social policy committee
Andrey Shokhin	executive	Alexksandr Avdeyev, elected governor in the 2022 elections	head of administration of the city of Vladimir	5 years, from 17 September 2022 to September 2027	Member of the Committee on Federal Structure, Regional Policy, Local Self-Government and Northern Affairs

In the 2021 elections to the State Duma of the 8th convocation (2021–2026), two deputies from the Vladimir Oblast were elected in two constituencies: in constituency No. 79 - Igor Igoshin, in constituency No. 80 - Grigory Anikeyev.

According to party lists of the single federal district (proportional system) in the regional group Vladimir Oblast, three candidates received mandates: Nikolai Burlyaev (A Just Russia), Aleksey Govyrin (United Russia), and Roman Lyabikhov (Communist Party).

== Economy and transportation ==
The largest companies in the region include the local branches of Mondelez International (revenues of $738.74 million in 2017) and Ferrero SpA ($625.61 million), Treyd Servis (baby food manufacturer, $449.07 million), Starodvorskiye Kolbasy (sausage producer, $277.67 million).

The Gusevskoye peat narrow gauge railway for hauling peat operates in the Gus-Khrustalny District.

== Demographics ==
Historical population
Year	Pop.	±%
1897	1,515,691	—
1926	1,321,140	−12.8%
1939	1,351,419	+2.3%
1959	1,402,910	+3.8%
1970	1,510,913	+7.7%
1979	1,580,382	+4.6%
1989	1,653,938	+4.7%
2002	1,523,990	−7.9%
2010	1,443,693	−5.3%
2021	1,348,134	−6.6%
Source: Census data

Population: 1,348,134 (2021 census); 1,443,693 (2010 Census); 1,523,990 (2002 census); 1,653,938 (1989 Soviet census).

Vital statistics for 2024:

- Births: 8,072 (6.2 per 1,000)
- Deaths: 21,174 (16.2 per 1,000)

Total fertility rate (2024):
1.14 children per woman

Life expectancy (2021):
Total — 68.11 years (male — 63.18, female — 73.00)

Ethnic composition (2010):

- Russians: 95.6%
- Ukrainians: 0.9%
- Tatars: 0.5%
- Armenians: 0.5%
- Belarusians: 0.3%
- Others: 2.2%
- 95,410 people were registered from administrative databases, and did not declare an ethnicity. It is estimated that the proportion of ethnicities in this group is the same as that of the declared group.

=== Settlements ===
Largest cities or towns in Vladimir Oblast 2010 Russian Census
Rank		Administrative Division	Pop.
1	Vladimir	City of oblast significance of Vladimir	345,373
2	Kovrov	Kovrovsky District	145,214
3	Murom	Muromsky District	116,075
4	Alexandrov	Alexandrovsky District	61,551
5	Gus-Khrustalny	Gus-Khrustalny District	60,784
6	Kolchugino	Kolchuginsky District	45,776
7	Vyazniki	Vyaznikovsky District	41,248
8	Kirzhach	Kirzhachsky District	29,965
9	Yuryev-Polsky	Yuryev-Polsky District	19,595
10	Sobinka	Sobinsky District	19,482

=== Religion ===
Religion in Vladimir Oblast as of 2012 (Sreda Arena Atlas)
Russian Orthodoxy	42.3%
Other Orthodox	1.2%
Other Christians	5.3%
Islam	0.7%
Rodnovery and other native faiths	0.5%
Spiritual but not religious	32%
Atheism and irreligion	13.9%
Other and undeclared	4.1%

According to a 2012 survey, 42.3% of the population of Vladimir Oblast adheres to the Russian Orthodox Church, 5.1% are unaffiliated Christians, 1.2% are Eastern Orthodox Christian believers who don't belong to the church or belong to other (non-Russian) Eastern Orthodox churches, and 0.5% of the population are adherents of the Slavic native faith (Rodnovery). In addition, 32% of the population declares to be "spiritual but not religious", 13.9% is atheist, and 4.8% follows other religions or did not give an answer to the question.

== Notable people ==
- Edward Shatov (born 1973), Russian Catholic priest, director of Center for Family of Roman Catholic Archdiocese of Mother of God at Moscow
- Mikhail Speransky (born 1772), Russian statesman and reformist, also referred to as the father of Russian liberalism
- Nikolay Zhukovsky (born 1847), Russian scientist, mathematician and engineer, and a founding father of modern aero- and hydrodynamics
