= Orsk constituency =

Legislative constituency in Russia

Orsk single-member constituency
- Constituency of the Russian State Duma

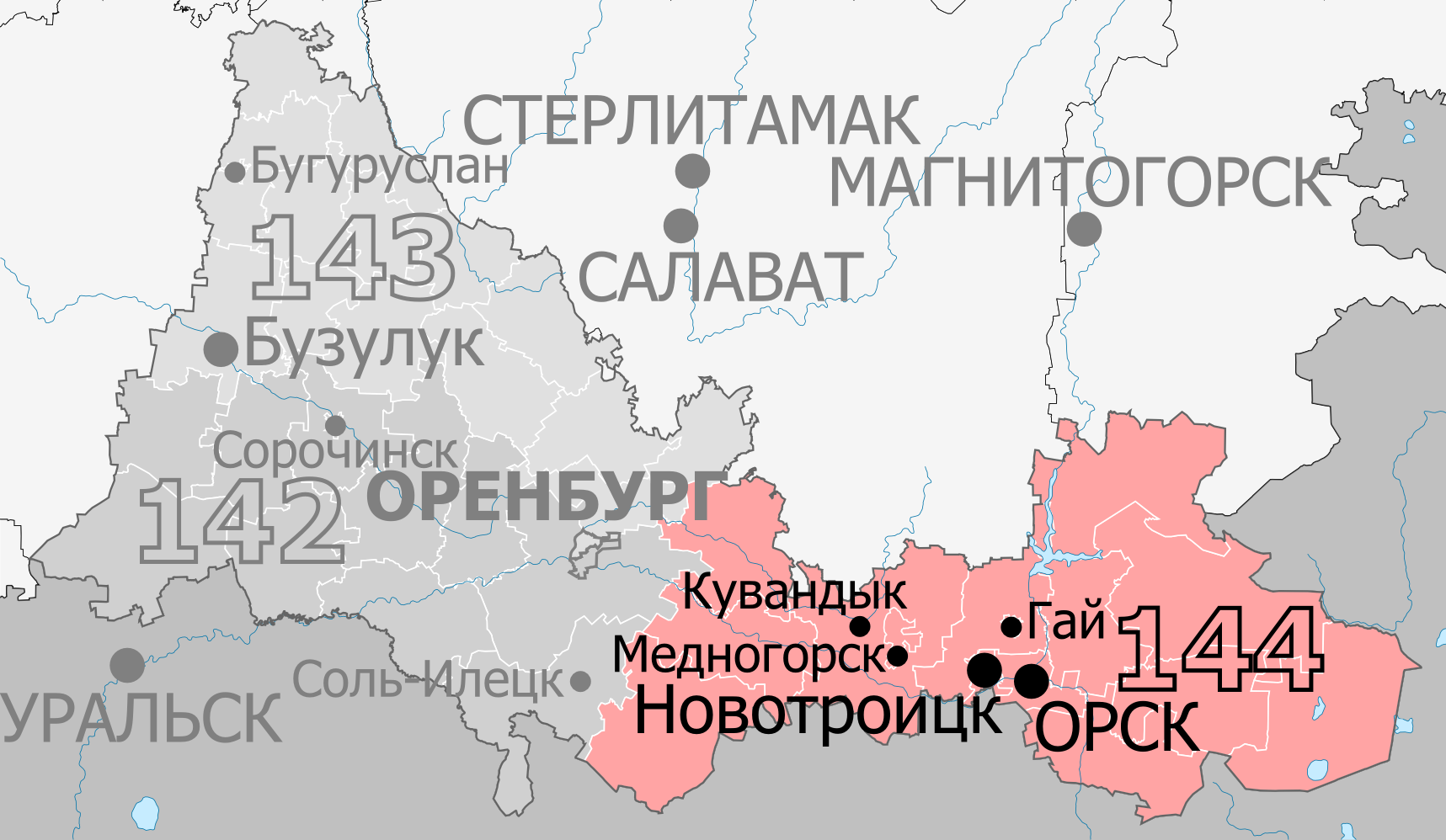
- Constituency boundaries since 2016
- Deputy: Valery Leonov; United Russia
- Federal subject: Orenburg Oblast
- Districts: Adamovsky, Akbulaksky, Belyayevsky, Dombarovsky, Gaysky, ZATO Komarovsky, Kuvandyksky, Kvarkensky, Mednogorsk, Novoorsky, Novotroitsk, Orsk, Saraktashsky, Svetlinsky, Yasnensky
- Voters: 456,930 (2026)

The Orsk constituency (No.146 (Note: No.133 in 1993-2007, No.144 in 2016–2026)) is a Russian legislative constituency in Orenburg Oblast. The constituency covers eastern Orenburg Oblast, including the cities Orsk, Gay, Kuvandyk, Mednogorsk and Novotroitsk.

The constituency has been represented since 2026 by United Russia deputy Valery Leonov, former Deputy Minister of Construction, Housing and Utilities of Russia, who won the open seat, succeeding five-term United Russia incumbent Viktor Zavarzin.

== Boundaries ==
1993–2007: Adamovsky District, Dombarovsky District, Gay, Gaysky District, Kuvandyk, Kuvandyksky District, Kvarkensky District, Mednogorsk, Novoorsky District, Novotroitsk, Orsk, Saraktashsky District, Svetlinsky District, Yasnensky District, Yasny
The constituency covered eastern Orenburg Oblast, including major industrial city Orsk, industrial town Kuvandyk, metallurgy town Novotroitsk as well as copper-producing centres Gay and Mednogorsk.

2016–present: Adamovsky District, Akbulaksky District, Belyayevsky District, Dombarovsky District, Gaysky District, Komarovsky, Kuvandyksky District, Kvarkensky District, Mednogorsk, Novoorsky District, Novotroitsk, Orsk, Saraktashsky District, Svetlinsky District, Yasnensky District
The constituency was re-created for the 2016 election and retained all of its former territory, gaining Akbulaksky and Belyayevsky districts from Orenburg constituency.

== Members elected ==
Election	Member	Party
1993	Vladimir Volkov	Independent
1995	Vladimir Volkov	Communist Party
1999	Vladimir Volkov	Independent
2003	Boris Plokhotnyuk	Independent
2007	Proportional representation - no election by constituency	
2011	Proportional representation - no election by constituency	
2016	Viktor Zavarzin	United Russia
2021	Viktor Zavarzin	United Russia
2026	Valery Leonov	United Russia

== Election results ==
=== 1993 ===
Summary of the 12 December 1993 Russian legislative election in the Orsk constituency
Candidate	Party	Votes	%
Vladimir Volkov	Independent	56,217	20.72%
Viktor Yemelyanov	Independent	51,664	19.04%
Pyotr Teykhrib	Agrarian Party	37,571	13.85%
Aleksey Tsaryov	Independent	32,906	12.13%
Yury Khramov	Independent	13,709	5.05%
Vyacheslav Dyundin	Yavlinsky—Boldyrev—Lukin	10,458	3.85%
Mikhail Solobutov	Independent	7,905	2.91%
against all		38,322	14.12%
Total		271,366	100%

=== 1995 ===
Summary of the 17 December 1995 Russian legislative election in the Orsk constituency
Candidate	Party	Votes	%
Vladimir Volkov (incumbent)	Communist Party	157,609	47.51%
Aleksandr Selifanov	Independent	68,938	20.78%
Gennady Baturin	Liberal Democratic Party	33,131	9.99%
Viktor Nepomnyashchy	Congress of Russian Communities	18,965	5.72%
against all		44,292	13.35%
Total		331,771	100%

=== 1999 ===
Summary of the 19 December 1999 Russian legislative election in the Orsk constituency
Candidate	Party	Votes	%
Vladimir Volkov (incumbent)	Independent	88,053	25.87%
Boris Plokhotnyuk	Independent	62,887	18.48%
Ramil Gafarov	Fatherland – All Russia	52,422	15.40%
Yury Yerofeyev	Independent	23,382	6.87%
Viktor Isayev	Independent	19,095	5.61%
Rinat Khamiyev	Independent	17,350	5.10%
Viktor Fedorov	Independent	15,434	4.53%
Antonina Koshkina	Independent	13,438	3.95%
Lidia Kalinina	Spiritual Heritage	8,507	2.50%
Alla Lavrushko	Independent	2,005	0.59%
against all		31,265	9.19%
Total		340,340	100%

=== 2003 ===
Summary of the 7 December 2003 Russian legislative election in the Orsk constituency
Candidate	Party	Votes	%
Boris Plokhotnyuk	Independent	103,232	35.27%
Vladimir Volkov (incumbent)	Communist Party	50,932	17.40%
Valentina Izmaylova	Independent	34,875	11.92%
Viktor Tan	Agrarian Party	15,591	5.33%
Yury Kozhemyakin	Independent	9,246	3.16%
Igor Volkov	Independent	8,735	2.98%
Vladimir Silayev	Liberal Democratic Party	8,618	2.94%
Vyacheslav Dyundin	Yabloko	6,820	2.33%
Yevgeny Khvostov	Democratic Party	2,800	0.96%
Yury Kukushkin	Party of Russia's Rebirth-Russian Party of Life	2,304	0.79%
Dmitry Shatalin	Independent	1,838	0.63%
Vasily Kuzmin	United Russian Party Rus'	1,553	0.53%
against all		36,384	12.43%
Total		292,976	100%

=== 2016 ===
Summary of the 18 September 2016 Russian legislative election in the Orsk constituency
Candidate	Party	Votes	%
Viktor Zavarzin	United Russia	86,334	43.82%
Aleksandr Ivanov	Communist Party	34,147	18.85%
Vladimir Mirokhin	Liberal Democratic Party	25,862	13.12%
Kairat Kulakhmetov	A Just Russia	17,725	9.00%
Sergey Bentsman	Patriots of Russia	6,879	3.49%
Ruslan Ismagilov	Yabloko	5,609	2.85%
Olga Rybalko	People's Freedom Party	4,623	2.35%
Sergey Netesanov	Party of Growth	3,187	1.62%
Total		197,030	100%

=== 2021 ===
Summary of the 17-19 September 2021 Russian legislative election in the Orsk constituency
Candidate	Party	Votes	%
Viktor Zavarzin (incumbent)	United Russia	67,125	31.66%
Sergey Romanenko	Communist Party	50,427	23.79%
Aleksey Kashirsky	A Just Russia — For Truth	21,241	10.02%
Rinat Khamiyev	Yabloko	19,141	9.03%
Sergey Putintsev	Liberal Democratic Party	14,532	6.85%
Aleksandr Belyak	Party of Pensioners	14,388	6.79%
Ilya Buyanov	New People	11,166	5.27%
Total		212,011	100%

=== 2026 ===
Summary of the 18-20 September 2026 Russian legislative election in the Orsk constituency
Candidate	Party	Votes	%
Valery Leonov	United Russia	143,388	57.54%
Vyacheslav Rashchupkin	A Just Russia	26,381	10.59%
Nikolay Konobevtsev	Communists of Russia	21,495	8.63%
Ivan Dubinin	Liberal Democratic Party	17,697	7.10%
Vladimir Nitsenko	New People	12,406	4.98%
Danila Ibragimov	Party of Pensioners	11,547	4.63%
Valery Zhuravlev	Rodina	9,336	3.75%
Total		249,210	100%
