= Kuvandyksky =

Kuvandyksky (masculine), Kuvandykskaya (feminine), or Kuvandykskoye (neuter) may refer to:

- Kuvandyksky District, a district of Orenburg Oblast, Russia
- Kuvandyksky Urban Okrug, a municipal formation in Orenburg Oblast, Russia
