= Novouralsk (inhabited locality) =

Novouralsk (Russian: Новоуральск) is the name of several inhabited localities in Russia.

Urban localities

- Novouralsk, a closed town in Sverdlovsk Oblast

Rural localities

- Novouralsk, Kaliningrad Oblast, a settlement in Dobrovolsky Rural Okrug of Krasnoznamensky District in Kaliningrad Oblast
- Novouralsk, Orenburg Oblast, a selo in Novouralsky Selsoviet of Kuvandyksky District in Orenburg Oblast
