= Novotroitsk =

Town in Orenburg Oblast, Russia

Novotroitsk Новотроицк
- Town
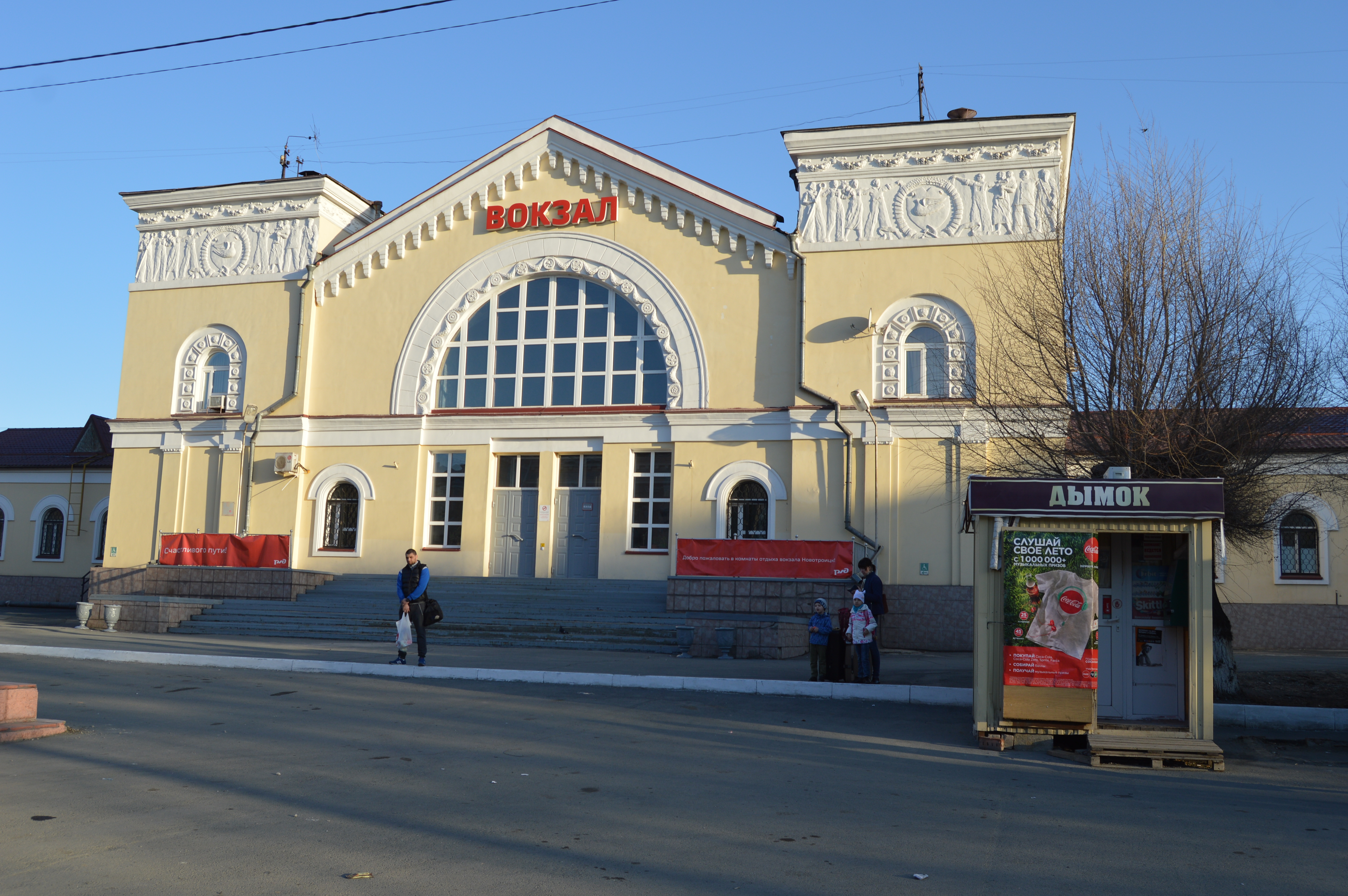

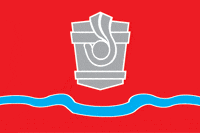
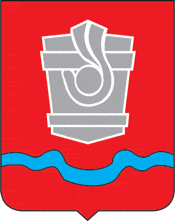
- Flag Coat of arms
- Interactive map of Novotroitsk
- Location of Novotroitsk Novotroitsk (Orenburg Oblast)
- Coordinates: 51°12′14″N 58°18′41″E
- Country: Russia
- Federal subject: Orenburg Oblast
- Founded: 1945

Area
  - Total: 352.34 km^{2} (136.04 sq mi)
- Elevation: 210 m (690 ft)

Population (2010 Census)
  - Total: 98,173
  - Estimate (2025): 73,994 (−24.6%)
  - Rank: 172nd in 2010
  - Density: 278.63/km^{2} (721.65/sq mi)

Administrative status
  - Subordinated to: Town of Novotroitsk
  - Capital of: Town of Novotroitsk

Municipal status
  - Urban okrug: Novotroitsk Urban Okrug
  - Capital of: Novotroitsk Urban Okrug
- Time zone: UTC+5 (MSK+2)
- Postal codes: 462361, 462421, 462360, 462359, 462356, 462351, 462354, 462363
- Dialing code: +7 3537
- OKTMO ID: 53720000001

Novotroitsk (Russian: Новотро́ицк) is a town in Orenburg Oblast, Russia, located on the right bank of and along the Ural River, 276 kilometers (171 mi) from Orenburg, on the border with Kazakhstan. It is the third-largest city in the oblast. In the east Novotroitsk almost borders the oblast’s second largest city, Orsk. The distance between the two cities is less than 2 kilometers (1.2 mi). Population: 98,173 (2010 census); 106,315 (2002 census); 106,084 (1989 Soviet census).

== History ==
The history of Novotroitsk goes back to the beginning of the 20th century. Several families of peasants/immigrants from Ukraine settled near Silnov khutor and named their settlement Novotroitsk. Two more khutors Akkermanovsky and Beloshapochny as well as Khabarnoye stanitsa located nearby.

The 1930s were the time of rapid industrialization in the Soviet Union. Alexander Fersman, a well-known academician and geologist, in his treatises described the abundance of mineral deposits near Orsk neighbourhoods and called Orsk-Khalilovo area the "true gem of the Urals."

In the fall of 1929 geologist Joseph Rudnitsky discovered the Khalilovskoye hematite field. Khalilovskoye ores contained chromium, nickel, titanium and manganese. Industrial tests confirmed its quality. In June 1931, the Government adopted a decision to start the construction of metallurgic plant based on resources from Khalilovskoye ores and Karaganda coal basin. The end of construction was scheduled for 1936. During this period the first builders arrived to Novotroitsk village. In 1935 the construction was suspended and only in the spring of 1939 after the 18th Congress of the All-Union Communist Party the resolution was adopted "... to begin the construction of new metallurgical plants (at Khalilovskoye and Bakalskoye ores)".

In the summer of 1939 the board of the People's Commissariat of Ferrous Metallurgy adopted a resolution, which says: "... to select the Novotroitsk area as a place for Khalilovo metallurgic plant construction...".

In 1941 Novotroitsk was granted the status of urban-type settlement. During the next three years the first school and hospital were built. Novotroitsky District, comprising Novotroitsk and Akkermanovka villages, was created in 1944. On April 13, 1945, Novotroitsk was granted the status of town.

On March 5, 1955, the first cast iron was produced at the metallurgic plant. The cement factory was launched in the same year. In 1982 the population of Novotroitsk climbed over 100,000. During the Soviet period a lot of cultural, sports and recreational institutions were founded including two palaces of culture, several cinemas, schools, colleges, hospitals, public park, two stadiums, swimming pool, consumer service center.

In 1992 formerly state-owned metallurgic plant was converted into joint-stock company. In 2002 the South Ural mining and processing company was founded. Eight years later the company launched a new cement plant within a few kilometers from Novotroitsk near Akkermanovka village.

According to the Russian Government order, in 2014 Novotroitsk was included into the list of monotowns with the most complex social-economic situation. By the Russian Government decree, in 2017 the new priority development area was created in the town. As at August 2021 ten companies has become the residents of the priority development area.

== Administrative and municipal status ==
Within the framework of administrative divisions, it is, together with nine rural localities, incorporated as the Town of Novotroitsk—an administrative unit with the status equal to that of the districts. As a municipal division, the Town of Novotroitsk is incorporated as Novotroitsk Urban Okrug.

== Demographics ==
After the foundation of the town in 1945 the population of Novotroitsk was increasing due to extensive industrial development. Since the dissolution of the Soviet Union the population has dropped by more than 20%.

Historical population
Year	Population	±%
1959	54,484	—
1970	83,439	+53.1%
1979	94,647	+13.4%
1989	106,084	+12.1%
2010	98,173	−7.5%
2021	82,463	−16.0%

== Economy ==
The town is located in the Orsk-Khalilovo industrial region of the southern Urals. The center of ferrous metallurgy in the area, the town has a major integrated iron and steel plant that was developed in the 1950s on the basis of nearby iron-ore deposits. Chemical production is also of importance to the region.

The town has a well-developed industry, and has twenty large and medium-sized enterprises which are employing more than 30,000 people. The town's economy largely determines the industry, accounting for 95.8% of total manufactured goods and services. Manufacturing firms in 2009 were shipped their own production of clean activities amounting to 54.24 billion rubles. The largest share in the volume of products shipped by type of activity "Manufacturing" fell on the organization of the metallurgical complex. - 75.3%, in the second position - processing of waste and scrap. - 12.7%, on the third - the production of foodstuffs, including beverages - 3.8%.

The main enterprise is the Iron and Steel Works JSC "Ural Steel".

The development of the town, its infrastructure is still determined by the state JSC "Ural Steel", which accounts for almost 90% of the total industrial output. The plant is part of the eight largest steel companies in Russia, and the rating of 200 subsidiaries in terms of sales takes 23rd place. The list of its products is very extensive; it is the only enterprise in the world that produces natural-casting alloy, chrome-nickel iron ore from its own fields.

Small business has become an integral part of modern market economic system. The town recorded 660 small enterprises and about 3000 entrepreneurs without legal entity. As the number of employees - more than 9000 people. Today, every fifth inhabitant of the city lives off of the revenue from small businesses.

== Social services ==
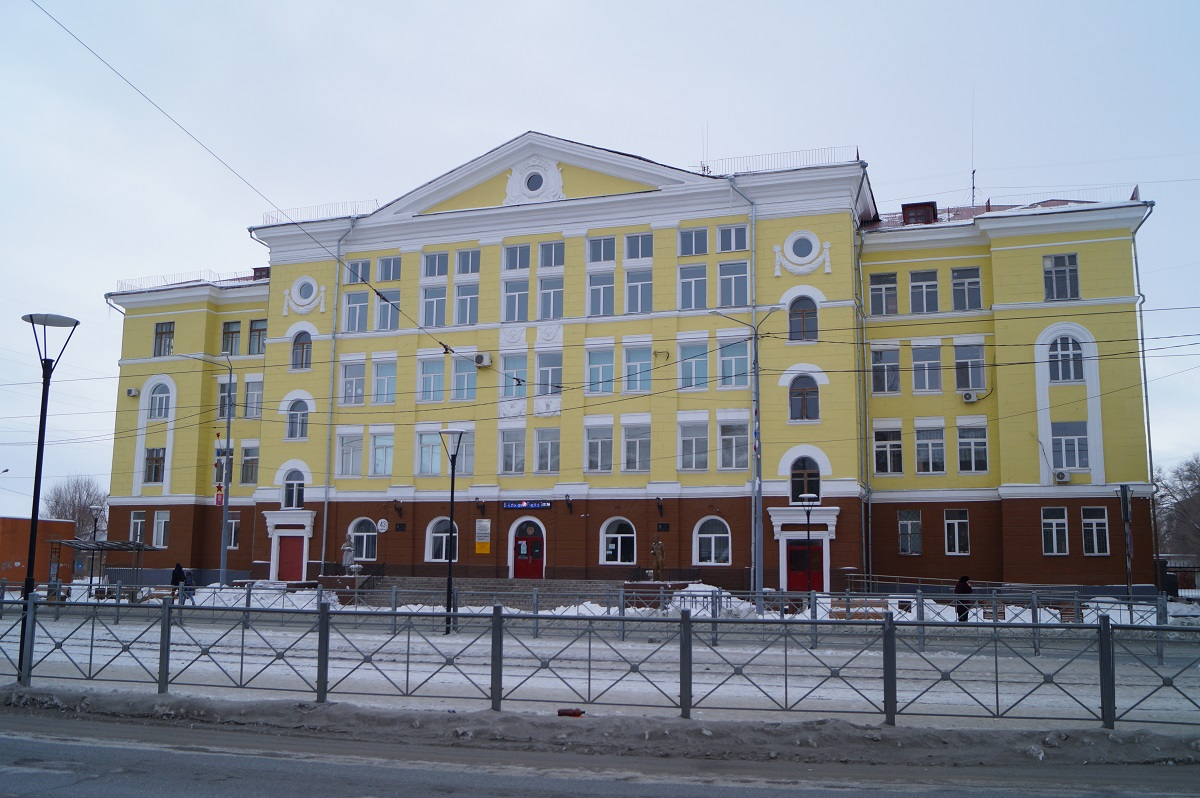
Civil engineering college building in Novotroitsk

=== Education ===
There are 22 kindergartens and 12 schools (including 1 gymnasium and 1 lyceum) in Novotroitsk. Secondary specialized educational institutions are represented by two colleges and three secondary schools. Civil engineering college (founded in 1946) and Polytechnical college (founded in 1959) each has nearly 1000 students enrolled in total of 20 specializations. There are also branches of the International Institute of Economics and Law and Moscow Institute of Steel and Alloys (MISiS).

=== Healthcare ===
There are six healthcare institutions in the town employing more than 500 physicians and 1,500 nursing personnel. In 2016 three hospitals have been incorporated into the one adult multi-functional institution with in-patient, out-patient, emergency and occupational health examination departments. Since the COVID-19 pandemic outbreak, five units of the hospital, including maternity unit, were converted for admission of the patients with confirmed coronavirus diagnosis.

Other medical institutions in the town include children's hospital, dental clinic, tuberculosis dispensary, dermatovenerologic dispensary, center for AIDS control and prevention.

== Culture ==
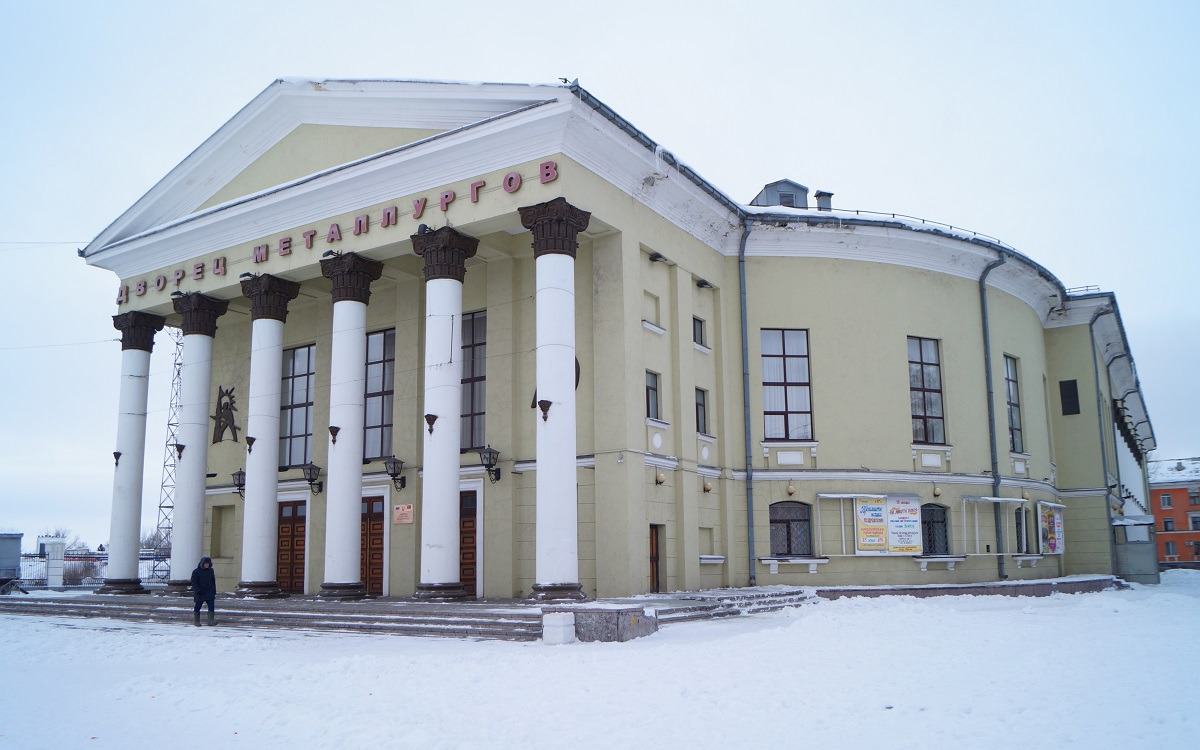
Metallurgists Palace of Culture in Novotroitsk

Metallurgists Palace of Culture is the main cultural institution in Novotroitsk. 2 municipal and 13 folk collectives including choirs, two folk theatres, Russian folk song and dance ensembles and Tatar-Bashkir encemble carry out their activities in the centre. The artistic groups perform at holiday concerts in the town and neighbouring rural communities.

Molodyozhniy (Youth) centre is the only cultural institution in Zapadniy district. Initially erected as the Builders house of culture in 1968 it has more than 20 active creative collectives. Other cultural institutions in the town include schools of music and art, children's arts school, museum and exhibition complex, centralized library system with the total book stock of 625,000 copies.

During the Soviet times there were four cinemas in Novotroitsk. Currently the only cinema is located in Molodyozhniy centre building.

Cinemas in Novotroitsk
Name	Year of construction	Seating capacity	Fate of the building
Luch (Beam)	1959	300	Transferred to military comissariat of the town
Sever (North)	1964	300	Abandoned
Ekran (Screen)	1972	800	Demolished in 2021 after almost two decades of being abandoned
Stal (Steel)	1982	600	Abandoned
Molodyozhniy (Youth)	2012	382	Acting

== Transport ==
=== Air ===
The distance between Novotroitsk and the closest airport located near Orsk is approximately 37 km (23 mi). As at October 2021, the airport offers daily direct flights to Moscow operated by Aeroflot, Rossiya Airlines, Nordwind Airlines and Pegas Fly.

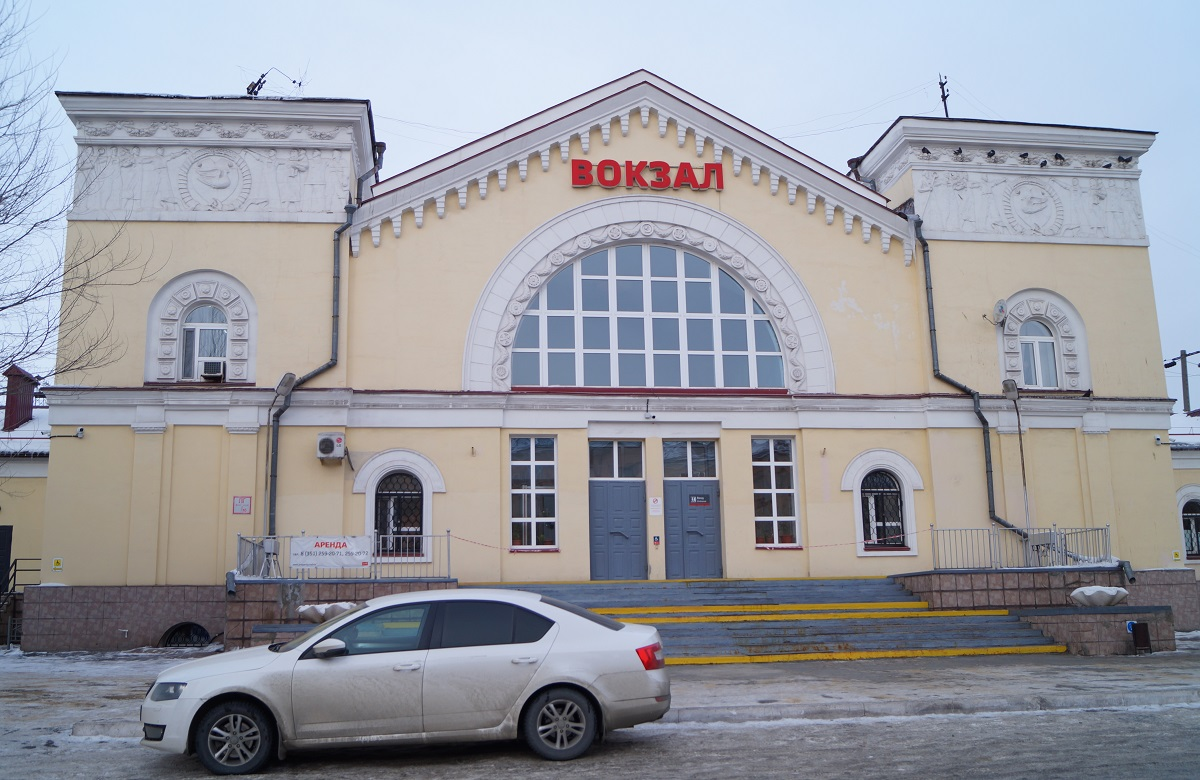
Novotroitsk railway station building

=== Railway ===
Orenburg-Orsk railway passes through the town. There are daily direct train service to Moscow with intermediate stops at Orenburg, Samara, Penza, Ryazan and other cities. Trains to Chelyabinsk and Yekaterinburg are operated every other day. Summer seasonal trains are bound for south Russian resorts such as Sochi, Anapa and Kislovodsk.

There are two daily westbound elektrichkas (suburban trains) from Orsk to Orenburg (6 hours) and Kuvandyk (2 hours) with intermediate stops near almost all localities.

Railway station building was constructed in 1955 and is an example of Stalinist architecture.

=== Public transport ===
==== Trams ====
The Novotroitsk tram network was opened on 5 November 1956. The first line connected residential area in the centre of town with the by-product-coke department of the metallurgic plant. Eleven years later the line was reached the shaped casting department. In 1969-72 the line was prolonged to two other residential areas — Zapadniy (Western) district and Microrayon. During the hard times of the 1990s the metallurgic plant took control of the tram network and the ride was free of charge for all citizens. In 2002 the tram network was transferred to independent municipal enterprise.

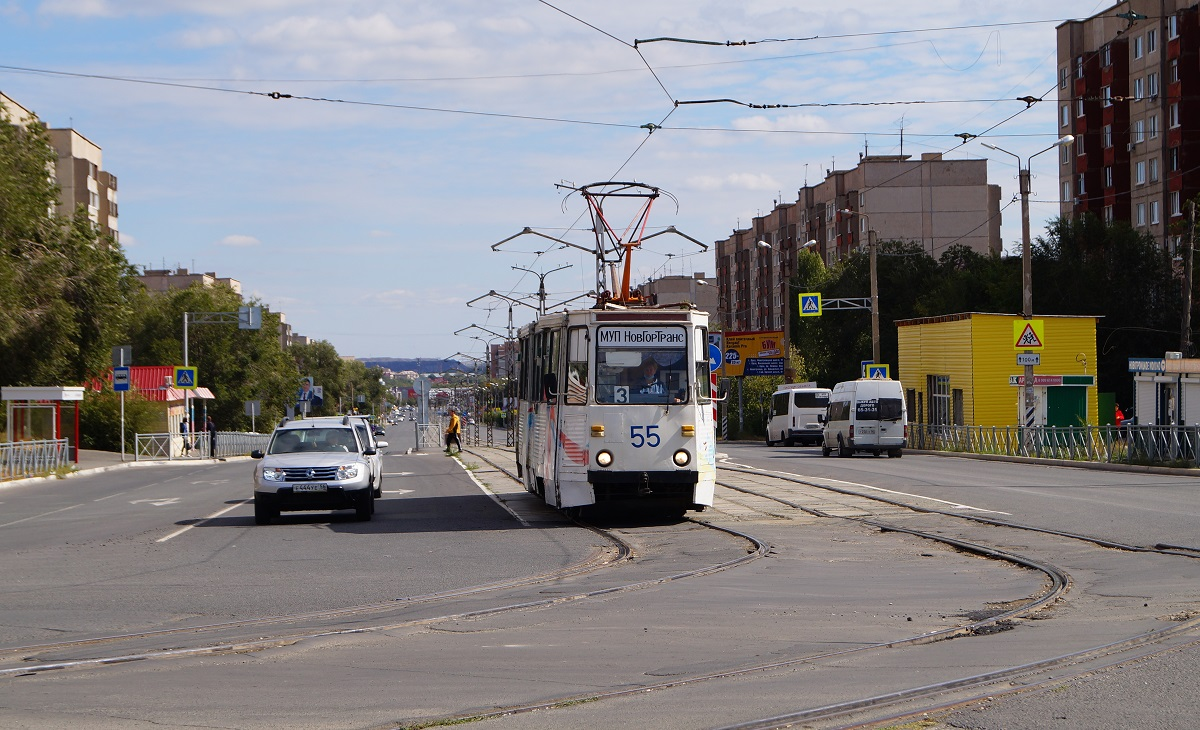
Novotroitsk tram

There are five regular routes, four of them connect the residential areas with the metallurgic plant. The total track length is 30.3 km (18.8 mi). The rolling stock consist of 67 tram cars and mostly represented by models manufactured by UKVZ plant (such as 71-605, 71-608, 71-619). As at 2021 one-way tram ride costs as low as 13 RUB or even less using mobile payment or credit/debit cards. Monthly travel cards are also available for adults, pupils and seniors.

==== Buses ====
Besides the tram network, the public transport in Novotroitsk is represented by recently bought municipal buses (5 routes) and overworn marshrutkas (dozen routes). As at 2021 one-way ride costs 20-25 RUB depending on route.

Suburban passenger service is also developed. The most popular route is between Novotroitsk and Orsk. Marshrutkas shunt between the two towns every 10–30 minutes with 55 RUB fare for one-way ride. Direct routes to Gay are also available 4 times per day.

There is also direct connection between Novotroitsk and neighbouring localities included on the urban okrug such as Guberlya (6 times per day, 60 RUB), Khabarnoye (8-10 times per day, 30 RUB), Akkermanovka (every 45 minutes, 25 RUB). During summer seasons additional buses are bound for dachas and garden plots situated outside the town.

== Cityscape ==
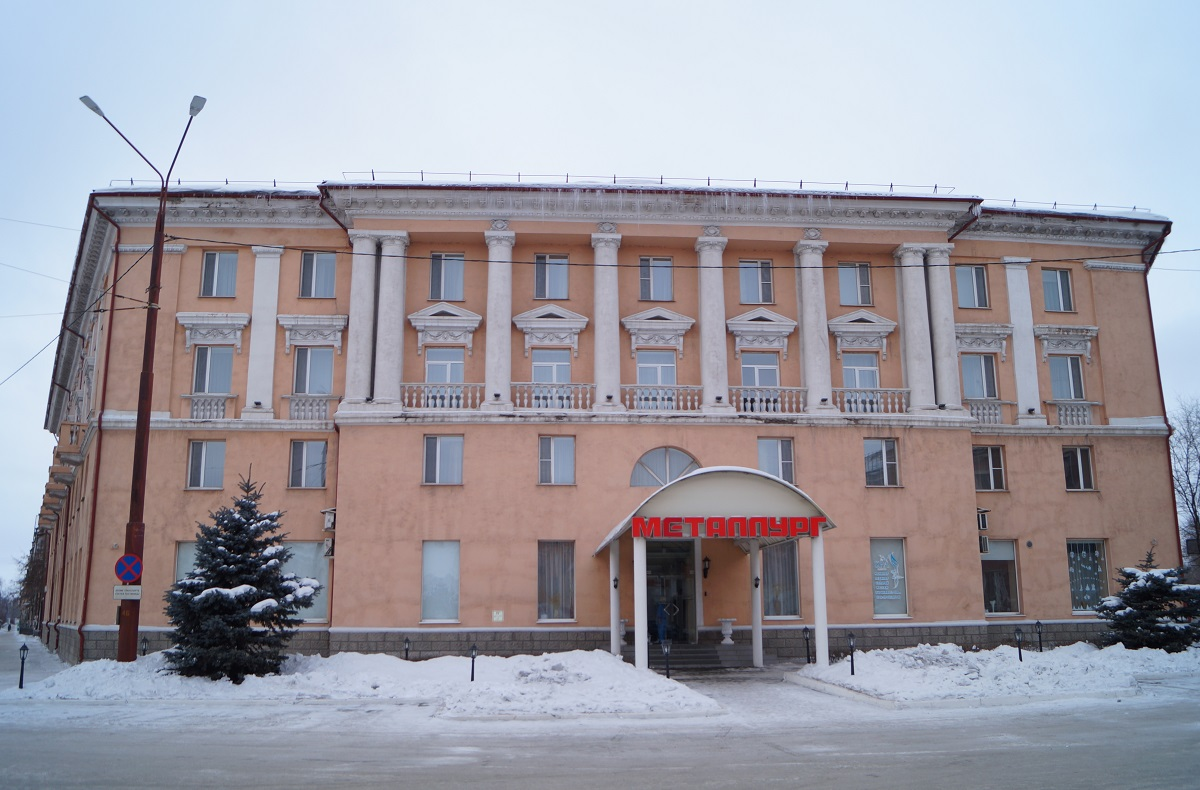
Metallurg hotel, Novotroitsk

=== Architecture ===
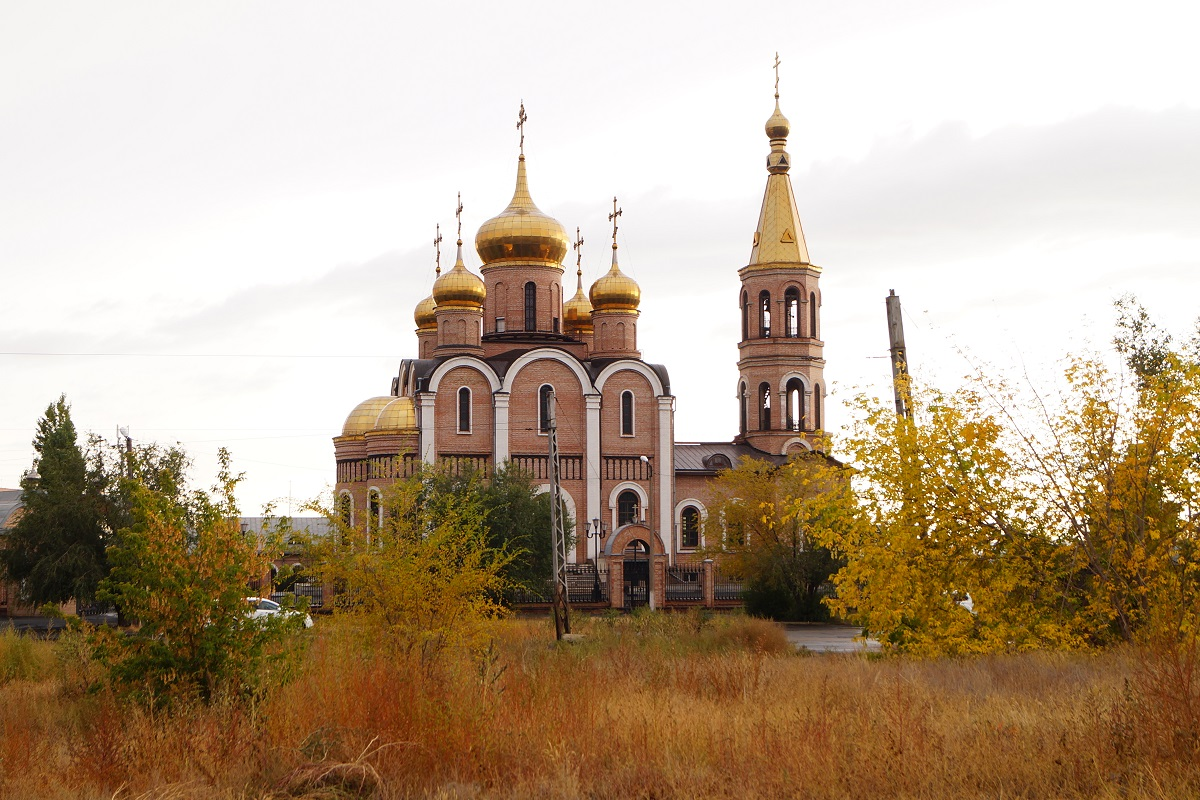
St Peter and Paul's church in Novotroitsk

Novotroitsk has a regular space planning with wide sidewalks and recreational areas. The main street called Sovetskaya is accompanied by the tram line along its entire length. Post-war stalinist architecture style is dominating along the first 2 km (1.25 mi) section of the street. The most notable examples are railway station building, "Metallurg" hotel and Metallurgists Palace of Culture. The latter was completed on November 3, 1963, though the Nikita Khrushchev's decree "On liquidation of architectural excesses" had been adopted eight years ago. Extensive reconstruction and beautification of the main street began in 2020. It is planned to restore the facades of at least 50 residential buildings in the next 3 years. 2 billion rubles were allocated by local and regional authorities and Metalloinvest company.

St Peter and Paul's church is considered as the most recognisable symbol of the town. It is located near the opposite end of Sovetskaya street. The place of worship was erected in 2005 and belongs to Orsk diocese of Russian Orthodox Church.

=== Parks ===
Metallurgists public park is located in the old centre and has an area of 0.102 km^{2} (0.04 mi^{2}). In the 2010s during the renovation dozens of soviet amusement devices were removed and lots of old trees were sawn away. The park has outdoor performance stage, workout grounds, playgrounds, sculptures. High ropes course is located nearby.

Several gardens and squares are laid out throughout Sovetskaya street. There is only public open space in Zapadniy microdistrict neighboured by Molodyozhniy cinema. Pedestrian areas on Lomonosov and Gorkiy streets have not been rehabilitated since the Soviet times and are unsuitable for leisure.

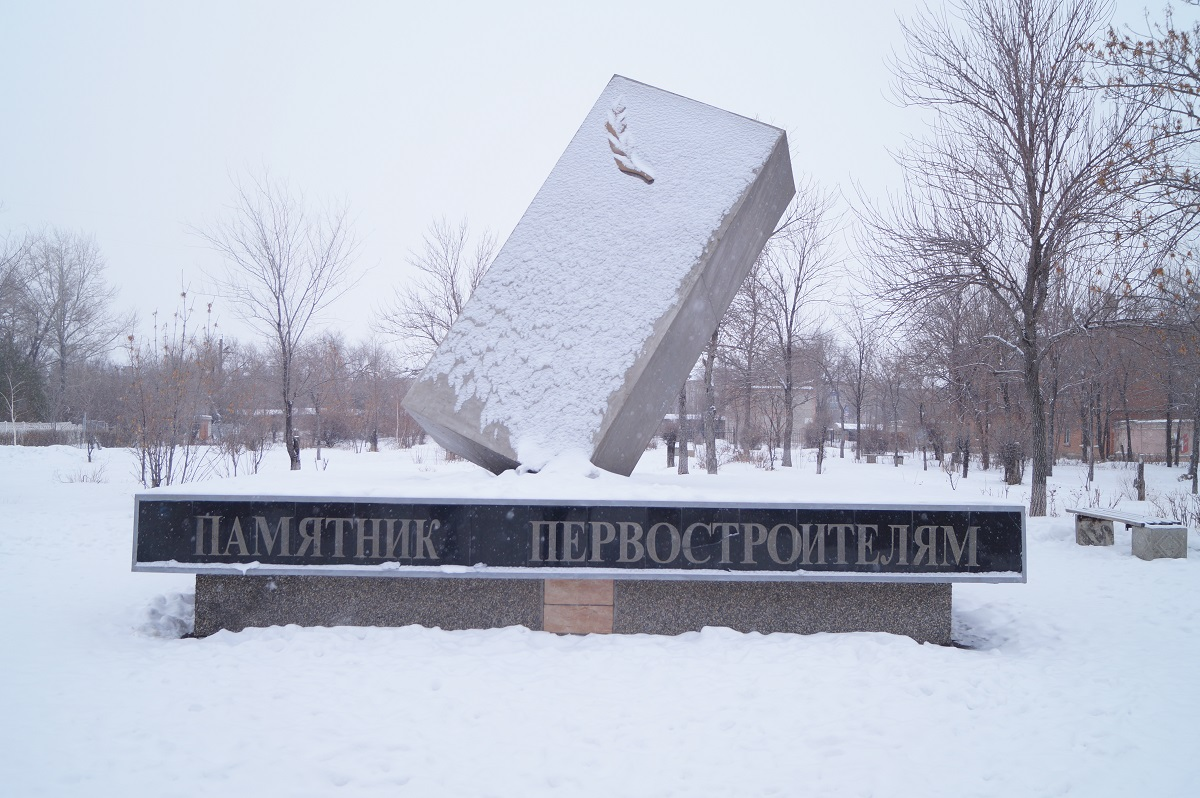
Monument in honor of pioneer builders of Novotroitsk

=== Monuments ===
There are several monuments installed during the Soviet period:

- Three Vladimir Lenin statues were built in 1957, 1970 and 1975;
- Great Patriotic War victims Memorial was opened on November 7, 1967, and was fully restored in 2005;
- Monument in honor of pioneer builders of Novotroitsk was installed in Zapadniy district on June 20, 1970;
- 12 meters-high "Metallurgist" monument designed by sculptor Lev Golovnitsky was opened on July 19, 1985. Originally the monument was installed on Metallurgists square, but later it was moved to the cast shaped department of the plant;
- Several (at least four) gypsum sculptures specific to socialiast realism art.

There are also some monuments erected in the post-soviet period:

- Monument dedicated to the soldiers who dead during the Soviet-Afghan War and other international conflicts;
- Monument in honor of geologist Joseph Rudnitskiy who discovered iron ore deposits near present-day Novotroitsk and is considered as the founder of the town;
- Monument dedicated to Konstantin Sitkin, native of Novotroitsk, who dead during the Second Chechen War.

== Sports ==
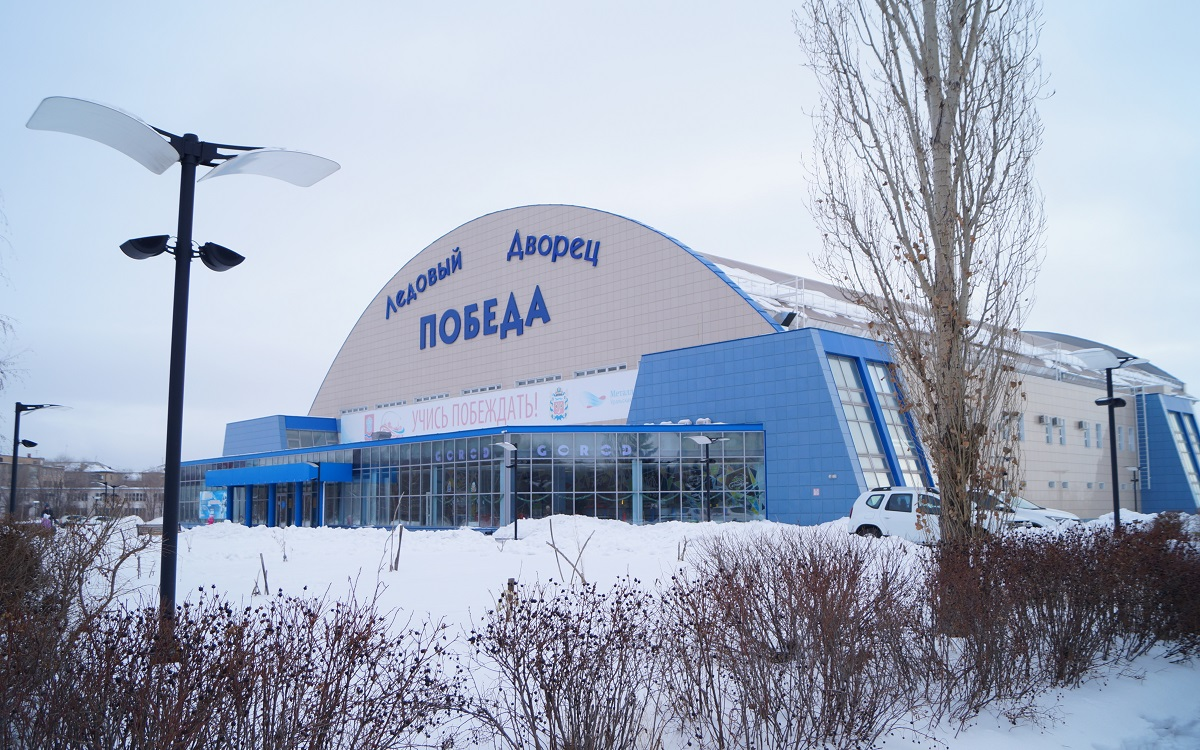
'Pobeda' ice arena

FC Nosta founded in 1991 currently plays in the Football National League 2 (FNL2) which is the third level of Russian professional football. The team play its matches at the Metallurg stadium with total capacity of 6,060 people.

After the 1999 season the club qualified to the Second division but within a year it was relegated back to the Third division. In 2006 FC Nosta headed the list of Ural-Povolzhye zone of the Third Division and again qualified to the Second Division. Four players and head coach of the club won individual awards. During the next two seasons after promotion the club took 7th and 5th places, respectively. In 2009 season the football club was relegated to the Third division. At the beginning of 2010 it was announced about the dissolution of the club due to lack of financing, but the new sponsorship was found very soon and FC Nosta continued playing.

There are five sports schools in the town specializing on team sports, swimming, boxing, martial arts. Sports facilities of Novotroitsk include swimming pool (built in 1986), ice arena (built in 2015) and two stadiums - Metallurg (built in 1954) and Yunost (built in 1964). Yunost stadium is currently under reconstruction. It is planned to build a new sports and recreation centre nearby.

Four-time Olympic medal-winner in swimming Evgeny Rylov is the native of Novotroitsk.
