= Metallurg Mednogorsk =

Russian ice hockey team

- City: Mednogorsk, Russia
- League: Pervaya Liga
- Founded: 1956
- Home arena: Iceberg Arena
- Colours: Yellow, red, white

Metallurg Mednogorsk is an ice hockey team in Mednogorsk, Russia. They play in the Pervaya Liga, the third level of Russian ice hockey. The club was founded in 1956.
