= Kvarkeno =

Rural locality in Orenburg Oblast, Russia

Kvarkeno Кваркено
- Interactive map of Kvarkeno
- Location of Kvarkeno Kvarkeno (Orenburg Oblast)
- Coordinates: 52°05′02″N 59°43′27″E
- Country: Russia
- Federal subject: Orenburg Oblast
- Administrative district: Kvarkensky
- Selsoviet: Kvarkensky
- Founded: 1842

Population (2010 Census)
  - Total: 3,923
  - Estimate (2021): 4,106 (+4.7%)

Municipal status
  - Municipal district: Kvarkensky
- Time zone: UTC+5 (MSK+2)
- Postal code: 462860
- Dialing code: +7 35364
- OKTMO ID: 53622410101
- Website: admkvarkeno.ru

Kvarkeno (Russian: Кваркено) is a rural locality (a selo) and the administrative center of Kvarkensky District, Orenburg Oblast, Russia. Population: 3,923 (2010 census); 4,184 (2002 census); 3,874 (1989 Soviet census).

The fortification was founded in 1842 by settlers from Krasnokholm near Orenburg. After receiving the status of stanitsa, it was named Kvarkeno in honour of the passage of Russian troops through the Kvarken Strait during the Finnish War.
