= Viktor Zavarzin =

Russian politician and former colonel general

- Виктор Заварзин
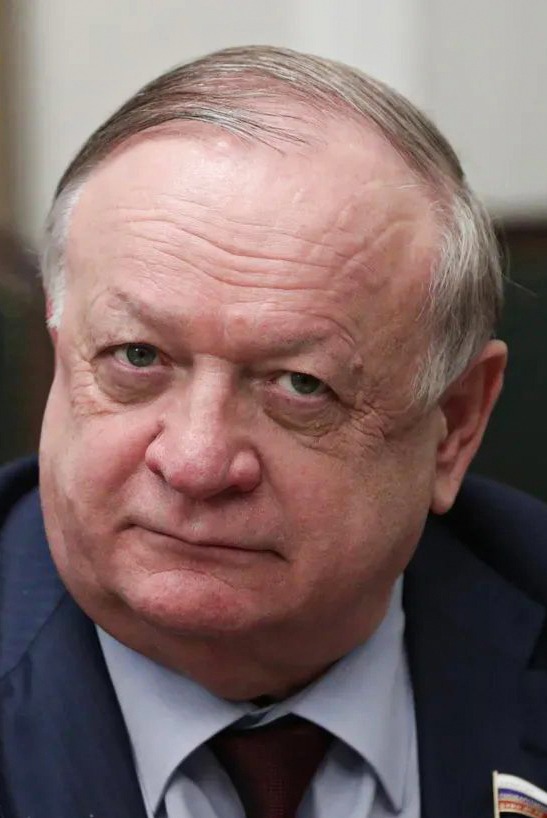
- Zavarzin in 2021

Member of the State Duma for Orenburg Oblast
- Incumbent
- Assumed office 5 October 2016
- Preceded by: constituency re-established
- Constituency: Orsk (No. 144)

Member of the State Duma for Kamchatka Krai
- In office 29 December 2003 – 24 December 2007
- Preceded by: Valery Dorogin
- Succeeded by: constituencies abolished
- Constituency: Kamchatka-at-large (No. 88)

Member of the State Duma (Party List Seat)
- In office 24 December 2007 – 5 October 2016

Personal details
- Born: 28 November 1948 (age 77) Zaoleshenka, SFSR, USSR
- Party: United Russia
- Education: OrjVUKU; Frunze Military Academy; VAGSH

Military service
- Allegiance: Soviet Union; Russian Federation
- Branch/service: Soviet Ground Forces; Russian Ground Forces
- Years of service: 1966-2003
- Rank: Colonel-General
- Commands: Separate Combined-Arms Army of Turkmenistan; CIS Collective Peacekeeping Force Tajikistan; Military Representative to NATO
- Battles/wars: Tajik Civil War; Incident at Pristina airport

Viktor Mikhailovich Zavarzin (Russian: Виктор Михайлович Зава́рзин; born 28 November 1948) is a former officer in the Soviet Ground Forces and later the Russian Ground Forces with the rank of colonel general.

== Biography ==
He attended the Frunze Academy in 1981 and the General Staff Academy in 1992.

In 1994, he was chief of staff and first deputy commander of the Separate Combined-Arms Army of Turkmenistan, after Soviet units in Turkmenistan passed under joint control between Russia and Turkmenistan. The Library of Congress Country Studies said that 'the Treaty on Joint Measures signed by Russia and Turkmenistan in July 1992 provided for the Russian Federation to act as guarantor of Turkmenistan's security and made former Soviet army units in the republic the basis of the new national armed forces.'

Later he became Russia's first military representative at NATO Headquarters (from November 1997 to November 2001, according to Scott and Scott's Russian Military Directory 2002). He was there in post during the Kosovo War. He may have originated the 'dash to Pristina' idea that saw Russian troops, detached from the SFOR peacekeeping force in Bosnia-Hercegovina, arrive in Pristina before KFOR arrived there.

His final military appointment was First Deputy Chief of Staff of the Staff for Coordinating Military Cooperation of the Commonwealth of Independent States.

On December 7, 2003, Viktor Zavarzin was elected to the State Duma of the fourth convocation of the Kamchatka constituency number 88 (Kamchatka region), the party "United Russia". He became Chairman of the Defense Committee of the State Duma from 16 January 2004.

December 2, 2007 elected to the State Duma of the fifth convocation on a federal list of candidates nominated by the All-Russian political party "United Russia", a member of the General Council of "United Russia". Chairman of the Defense Committee of the State Duma of the Russian Federation from December 24, 2007.

== Sanctions ==
He was sanctioned by Canada under the Special Economic Measures Act (S.C. 1992, c. 17) in relation to the Russian invasion of Ukraine for Grave Breach of International Peace and Security, and by the EU in relation to the 2022 Russian invasion of Ukraine.
