= Kvarkensky District =

Kvarkensky District Кваркенский район (Russian)
- District
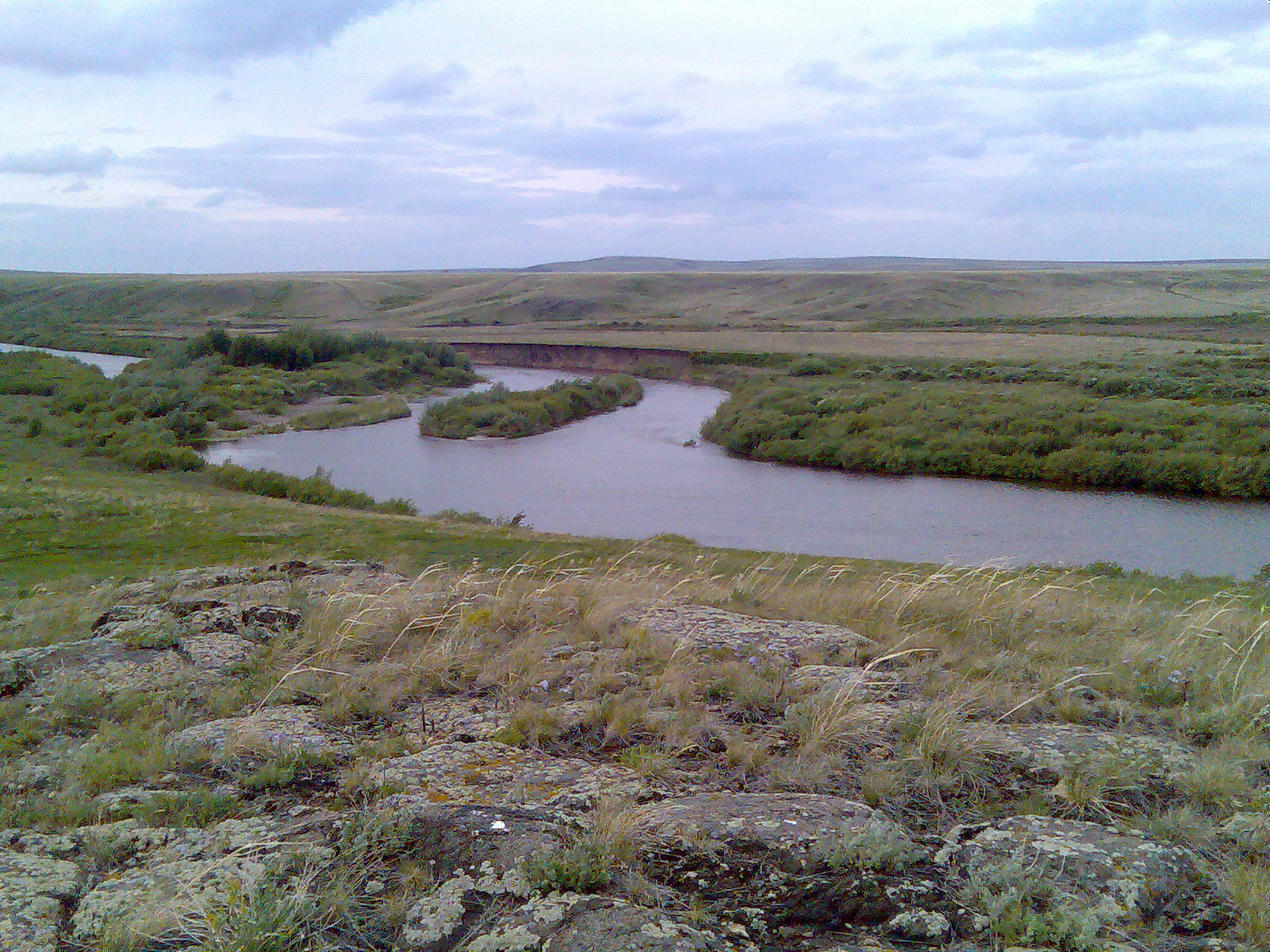
- River in Kvarkensky District

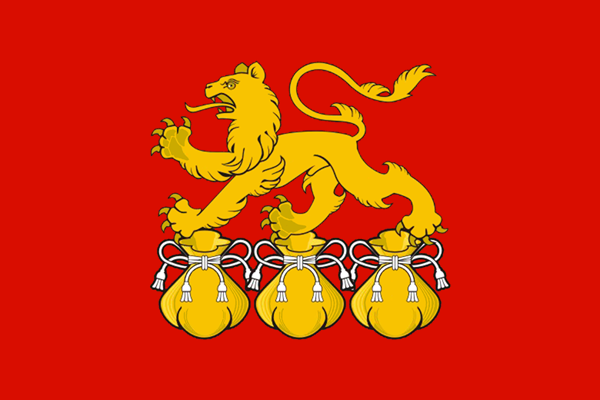
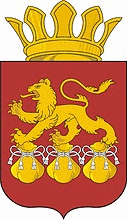
- Flag Coat of arms
- Location of Kvarkensky District in Orenburg Oblast
- Coordinates: 51°57′N 59°53′E
- Country: Russia
- Federal subject: Orenburg Oblast
- Established: 30 May 1927
- Administrative center: Kvarkeno

Area
  - Total: 5,200 km^{2} (2,000 sq mi)

Population (2010 Census)
  - Total: 18,655
  - Density: 3.6/km^{2} (9.3/sq mi)
  - Urban: 0%
  - Rural: 100%

Administrative structure
  - Administrative divisions: 12 Selsoviets, 2 Settlement councils
  - Inhabited localities: 41 rural localities

Municipal structure
  - Municipally incorporated as: Kvarkensky Municipal District
  - Municipal divisions: 0 urban settlements, 11 rural settlements
- Time zone: UTC+5 (MSK+2)
- OKTMO ID: 53622000
- Website: http://www.kvarkeno56.ru/

Kvarkensky District (Russian: Кваркенский райо́н) is an administrative and municipal district (raion), one of the thirty-five in Orenburg Oblast, Russia. The area of the district is 5,200 square kilometers (2,000 sq mi). Its administrative center is the rural locality (a selo) of Kvarkeno. Population: 18,655 (2010 Census); 23,525 (2002 census); 23,890 (1989 Soviet census). The population of Kvarkeno accounts for 21.0% of the district's total population.
