= Orenburg corridor =

Political border

The Orenburg corridor or Kuvandyk corridor (Bashkir: Ҡыуандыҡ коридоры; Kazakh: Қуандық дәлізі; Russian: Кувандыкский коридор; Tatar: Куандык коридоры) is a term used to refer to the Kuvandyk district of the Orenburg oblast, which lie between the Republic of Bashkortostan and Kazakhstan. Sometimes the Gaysky district is added to this.

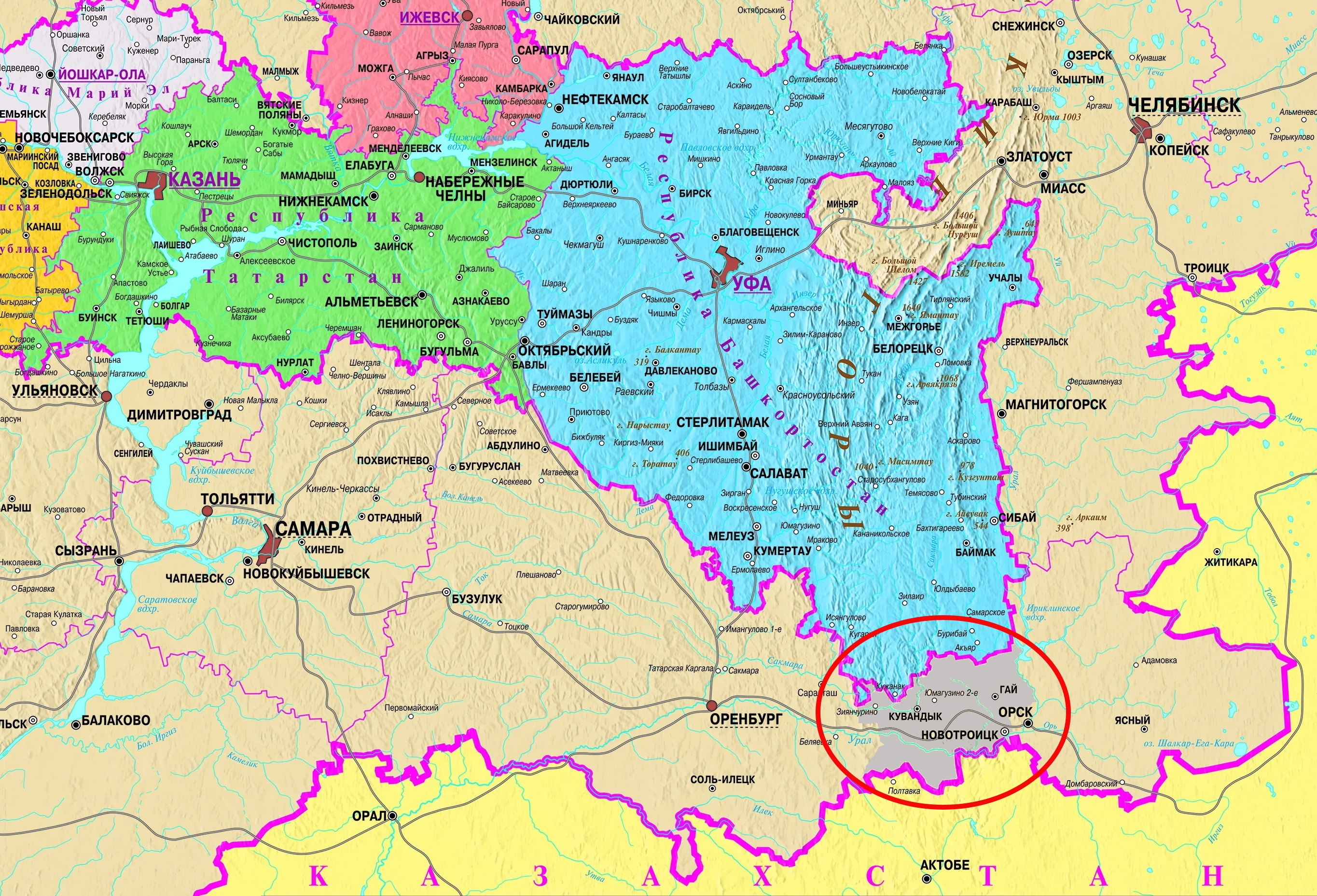
Orenburg corridor

== Etymology ==
The term was introduced by American political scientist Paul A. Goble in 2013. Goble believes that the emergence of a common Bashkir-Kazakh border will separate Moscow from Siberia and create the preconditions for the possible recognition of the independence of Bashkortostan and other republics of the Ural-Volga region.

== History ==
In 1742, construction of the Orenburg line of Russian fortresses began on the border of the Bashkir and Kazakh lands. The purpose of building the line was to stop Kazakh raids from beyond the Ural river and separate the Bashkirs from the Kazakhs. The center of the fortified line was the city of Orenburg (Orenburg Fortress), which was moved to its modern location.

In 1918, the Bashkirs and Kazakhs, in the wake of the collapse of the Russian Empire, proclaimed their national republics. The city of Orenburg was one of the most important centers of the Bashkir and Kazakh national liberation movements (Bashkurdistan, Alash Orda). In September 1918, a state conference of Bashkir and Kazakh representatives was held in Ufa.

After Bolshevization, autonomous Soviet republics within the RSFSR emerged in place of the national state entities of the Bashkirs and Kazakhs. Orenburg became the capital of the Kirghiz ASSR (Kazakh national autonomy), which bordered the Bashkir ASSR in the north. In 1925, the USSR leadership removed the Orenburg province from Soviet Kazakhstan, transferring it directly to the RSFSR. The so-called "corridor" was created, separating the two Turkic and Muslim republics. Subsequently, based on decisions to "clarify the border", it was repeatedly expanded. The Constitution of 1936 raised the status of some autonomous republics to the level of union republics. Among others, the status of the Kazakh ASSR was also raised. According to the constitution, union republics had the right to freely secede from the USSR. To realize this opportunity, they had to have a common border with external states. Due to the presence of Orenburg corridor, Bashkortostan did not fit this criterion - even if Kazakhstan had left the USSR. As a result, the Bashkir Republic retained the status of an ASSR, although in terms of territory and population it was comparable to a number of union republics. The territories of the Kuvandyksky and Gaysky districts of the Orenburg region were previously part of the Usergan and Zilair cantons of the Bashkir ASSR.

== Current status ==
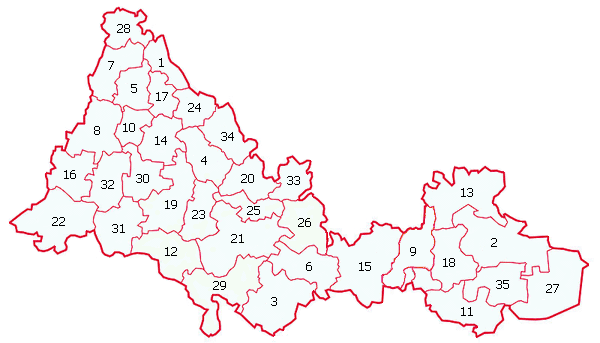
Kuvandyksky (number 15) and Gaysky (number 9) districts on the map of the Orenburg oblast.

Since all 6 republics of the Volga region do not have access to the external borders of the Russian Federation, political scientists and historians have repeatedly questioned the feasibility of them gaining state independence and leaving the Russian Federation.

Representatives of Tatar and Bashkir separatist groups consider the creation of corridor by the Soviet government to be a forced political step by Moscow aimed at cutting off the lands of Bashkortostan from Kazakhstan.

Director of the Institute of History of the Academy of Sciences of the Republic of Tatarstan Rafael Khakimov believes that for this purpose the tsarist and Bolshevik authorities encouraged the resettlement of Russians and Ukrainians to the Orenburg lands.

The issue of annexing the corridor to Bashkortostan has been repeatedly voiced by some organizations and politicians. In 2018, the Free Idel-Ural organization proposed to the head of Bashkortostan, Radiy Khabirov, to raise the issue of transferring the Kuvandyk district and the Gai district to the Republic of Bashkortostan. In 2021, Free Idel Ural responded to the statement of the Russian authorities on the need to consolidate Russian regions by proposing to annex the Kuvandyk corridor to Bashkortostan.

Ruslan Gabbasov, the leader of the Committee of the Bashkir National Movement Abroad, expressed his position on the issue of annexing the corridor to Bashkortostan, stating that Bashkortostan should restore its control over the corridor.

In 2018, the state news agency Kazinform hinted at the rupture of the Orenburg corridor, publishing a map of Kazakhstan that included the lands of the Orenburg region. The news was quickly removed, presenting the publication of the map as an unfortunate mistake.

== Demographics ==
According to the Census of 2021, three major Turkic ethnicities (Kazakhs, Bashkirs and Tatars) constitute 26.3% of Kuvandyk district, and Russians constitute 69.3%.

== See also ==
- Suwałki Gap
