= Kuvandyksky Urban Okrug =

Kuvandyksky Urban Okrug (Russian: Куванды́кский городско́й о́круг) is a municipal formation (an urban okrug) in Orenburg Oblast, Russia, one of the thirteen urban okrugs in the oblast. Its territory comprises the territories of two administrative divisions of Orenburg Oblast—Kuvandyksky District and the Town of Kuvandyk.

It was established on May 1, 2015 by the Law #3029/834-V-OZ of Orenburg Oblast by merging the municipal formations of former Kuvandyksky Municipal District and granting the resulting entity urban okrug status.
