= Kuvandyk =

Town in Orenburg Oblast, Russia

Kuvandyk Кувандык
- Town
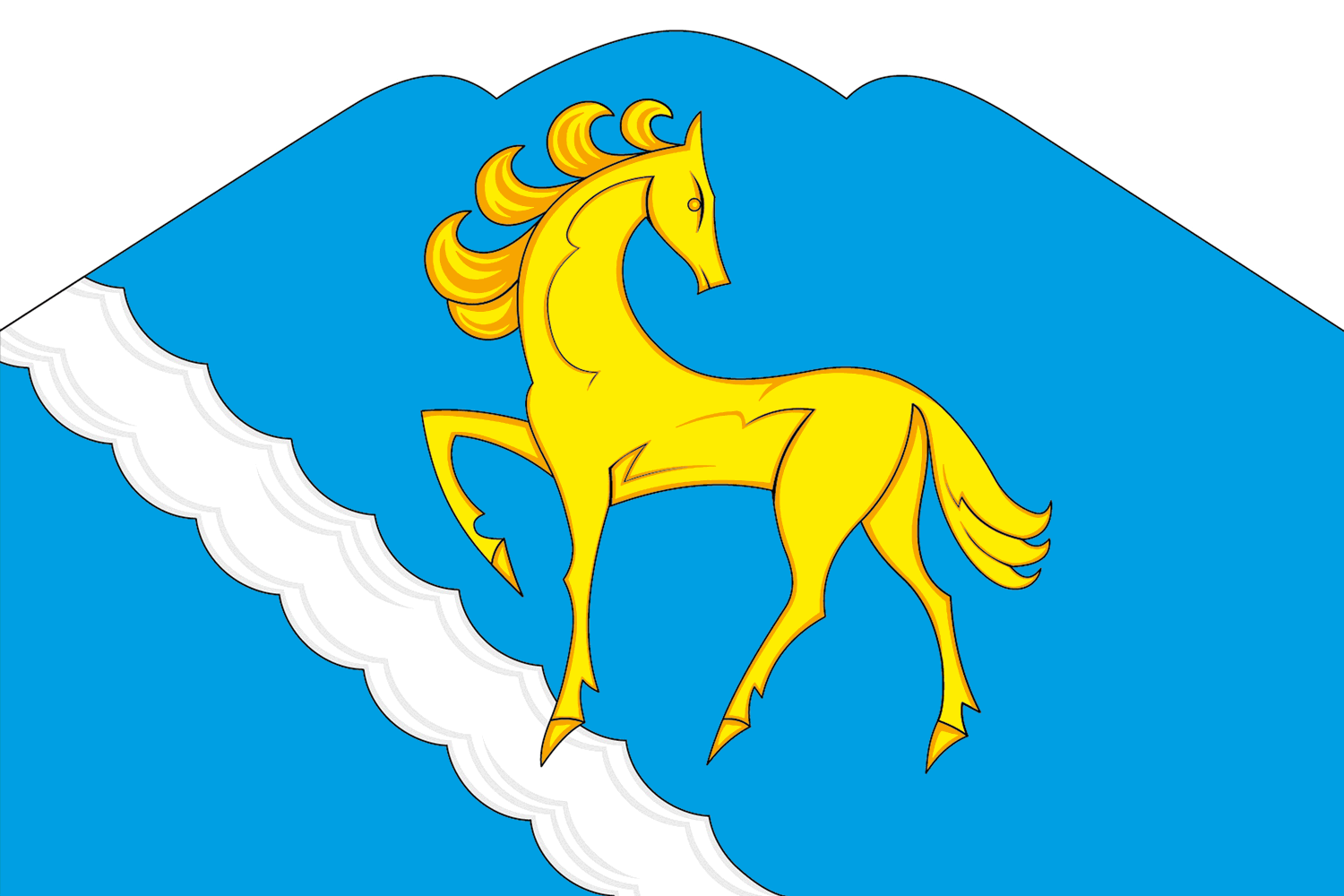
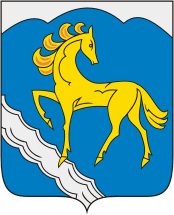
- Flag Coat of arms
- Interactive map of Kuvandyk
- Location of Kuvandyk Kuvandyk (Orenburg Oblast)
- Coordinates: 51°28′N 57°22′E
- Country: Russia
- Federal subject: Orenburg Oblast
- Founded: 1915
- Town status since: 1953
- Elevation: 210 m (690 ft)

Population (2010 Census)
  - Total: 26,169
  - Estimate (2021): 26,596 (+1.6%)

Administrative status
  - Subordinated to: Town of Kuvandyk
  - Capital of: Kuvandyksky District, Town of Kuvandyk

Municipal status
  - Urban okrug: Kuvandyksky Urban Okrug
  - Capital of: Kuvandyksky Urban Okrug
- Time zone: UTC+5 (MSK+2)
- Postal code: 462240–462244
- OKTMO ID: 53714000001
- Website: www.kuvandyk.org

Kuvandyk (Russian: Куванды́к, romanized: Kuvandyk) is a town in Orenburg Oblast, Russia, located on the Sakmara River at the southern end of the Ural Mountains, 194 kilometers (121 mi) east of Orenburg, the administrative center of the oblast. Population: 26,169 (2010 census); 28,679 (2002 census); 28,339 (1989 Soviet census).

== History ==
It was founded in the end of the 19th century as a migrants' village of Pokrovka (Покро́вка). It was granted town status in 1953.

== Administrative and municipal status ==
Within the framework of administrative divisions, Kuvandyk serves as the administrative center of Kuvandyksky District, even though it is not a part of it. As an administrative division, it is incorporated separately as the Town of Kuvandyk—an administrative unit with the status equal to that of the districts. As a municipal division, the territories of the Town of Kuvandyk and of Kuvandyksky District are incorporated as Kuvandyksky Urban Okrug.

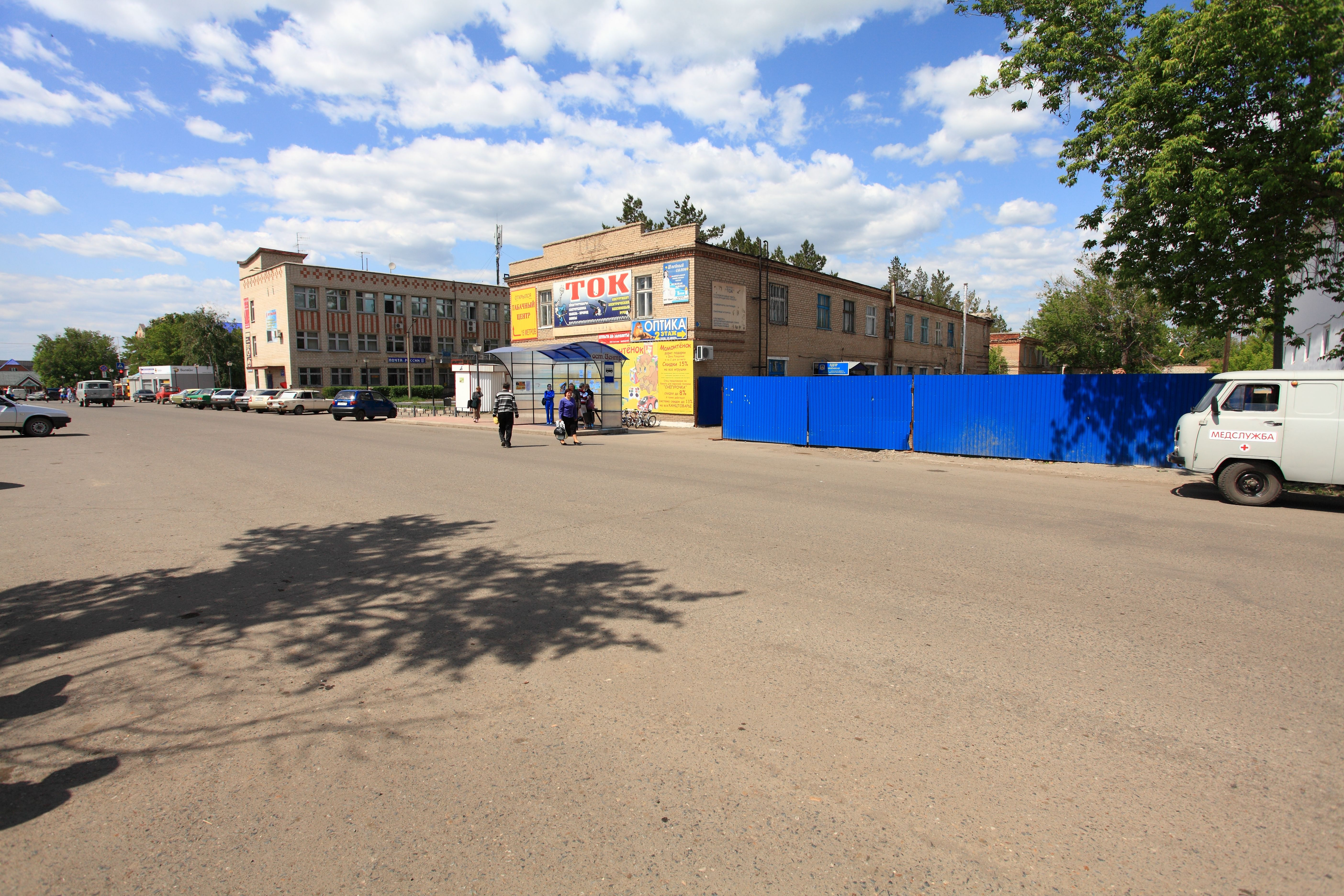
Downtown

== See also ==
- Kuvandyk corridor
