= List of chairmen of the Legislative Assembly of Orenburg Oblast =

The chairman of the Legislative Assembly of Orenburg Oblast is the presiding officer of that legislature.

== Chairmen ==
Name	Took office	Left office
Valery Grigorev	1994	2002
Yury Trofimov	2002	2006
Dmitry Kulagin	2006	2011
Sergey Grachev	2011	Present
