= Gaysky District =

Gaysky District Гайский район (Russian)
- District
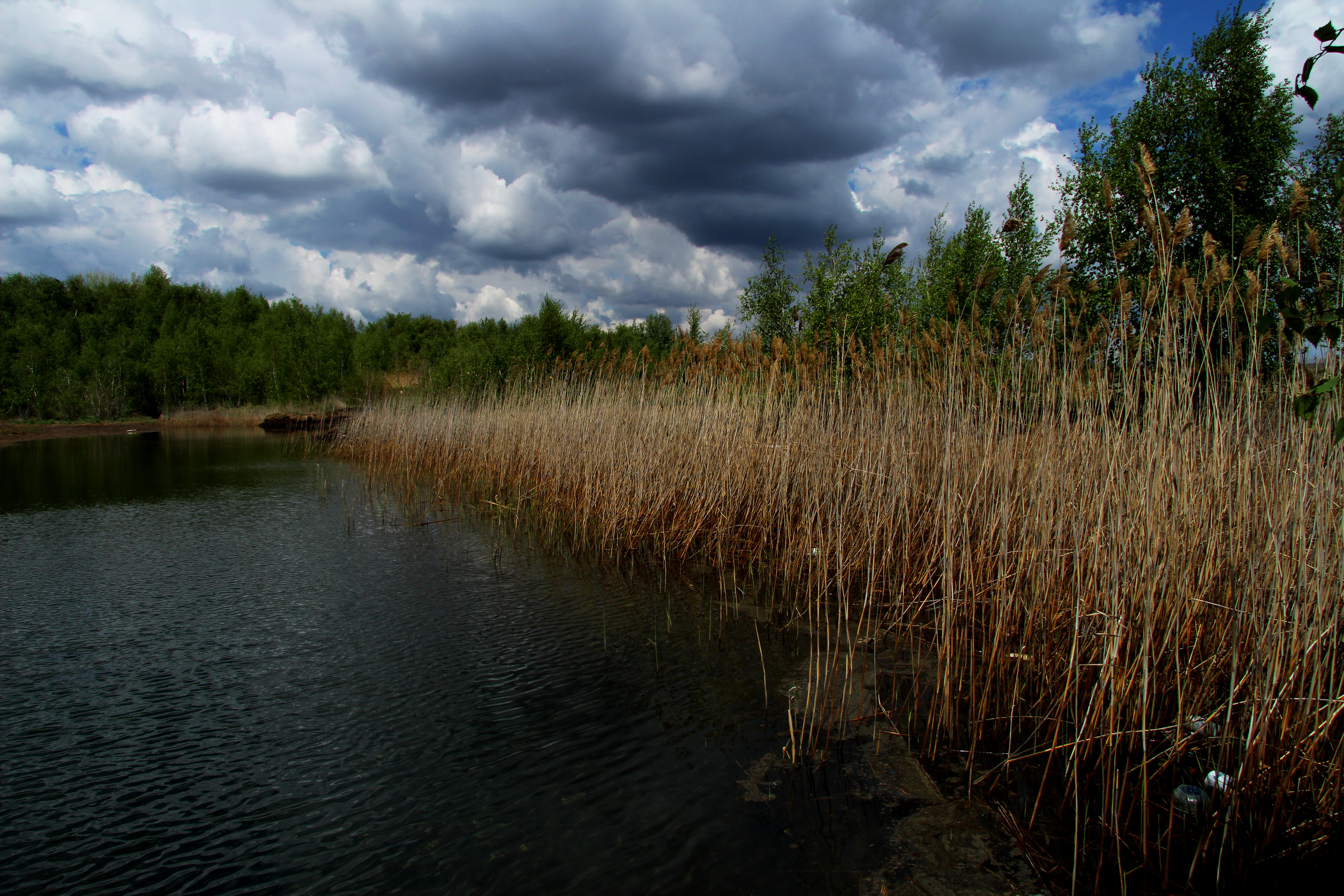
- Lake Kuporosnoye, a protected area of Russia in Gaysky District

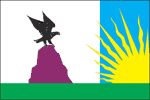
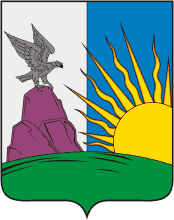
- Flag Coat of arms
- Location of Gaysky District in Orenburg Oblast
- Coordinates: 51°28′N 58°27′E
- Country: Russia
- Federal subject: Orenburg Oblast
- Established: 7 December 1934
- Administrative center: Gay

Area
  - Total: 2,900 km^{2} (1,100 sq mi)

Population (2010 Census)
  - Total: 10,331
  - Density: 3.6/km^{2} (9.2/sq mi)
  - Urban: 0%
  - Rural: 100%

Administrative structure
  - Administrative divisions: 8 Selsoviets
  - Inhabited localities: 33 rural localities

Municipal structure
  - Municipally incorporated as: Gaysky Urban Okrug
- Time zone: UTC+5 (MSK+2)
- OKTMO ID: 53713000
- Website: http://mo-gai.orb.ru/

Population of Gaysky District
- 2010 Census: 10,331
- 2002 Census: 12,188
- 1989 Census: 12,811
- 1979 Census: 51,486

Gaysky District (Russian: Га́йский райо́н) is an administrative district (raion), one of the thirty-five in Orenburg Oblast, Russia. It is located in the east of the oblast. The area of the district is 2,900 square kilometers (1,100 sq mi). Its administrative center is the town of Gay which is not administratively a part of the district. As of the 2010 Census, the total population of the district was 10,331.

== Administrative and municipal status ==
Within the framework of administrative divisions, Gaysky District is one of the thirty-five in the oblast. The town of Gay serves as its administrative center, despite being incorporated separately as an administrative unit with a status equal to that of the districts.

As a municipal division, the territory of the district and the territory of the Town of Gay are incorporated together as Gaysky Urban Okrug. Prior to June 1, 2015, the district was incorporated as Gaysky Municipal District, while the Town of Gay was incorporated separately as Gay Urban Okrug.

== See also ==
- Orenburg corridor
