= Mednogorsk =

Town in Orenburg Oblast, Russia

Mednogorsk Медногорск
- Town
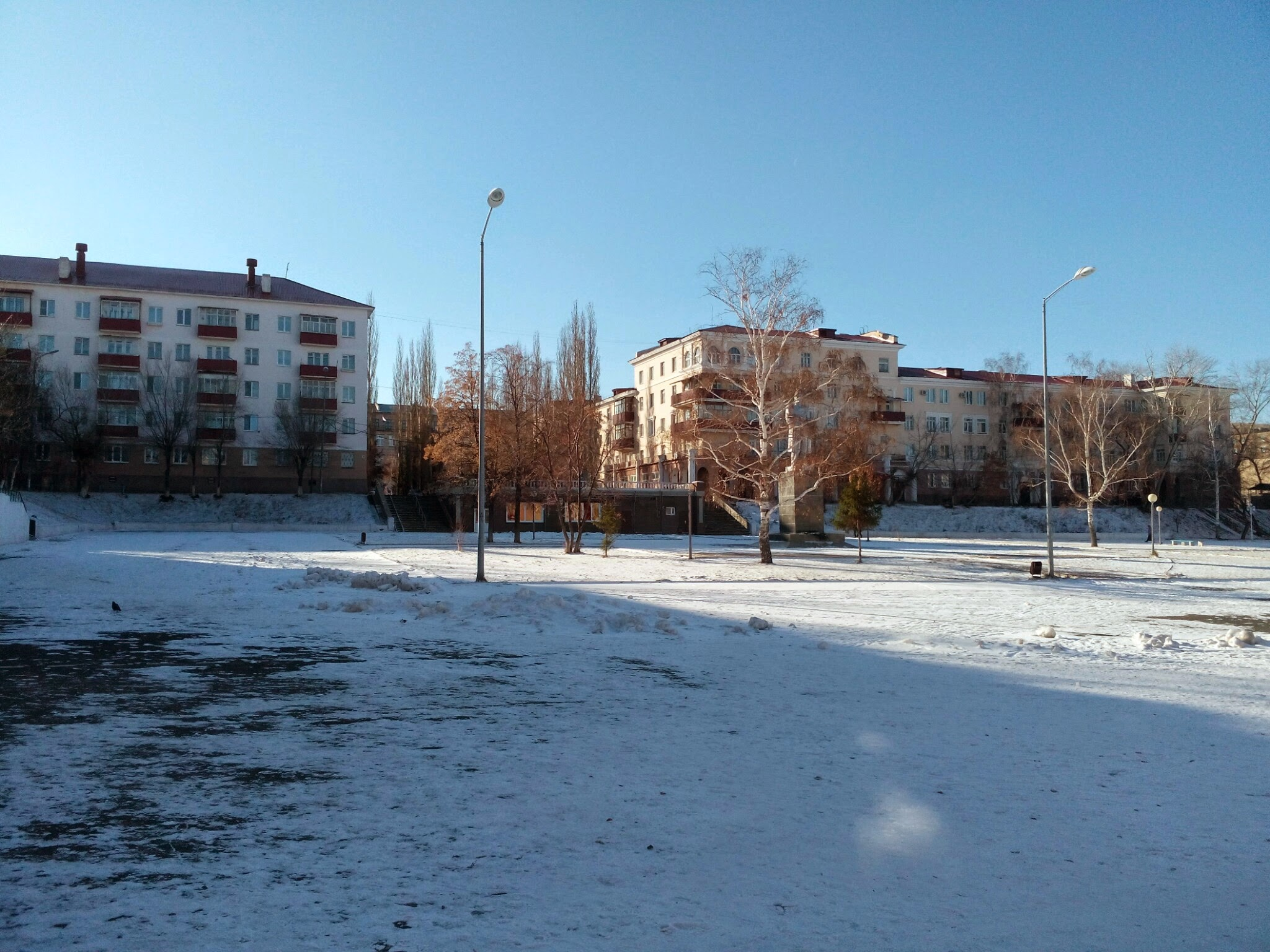

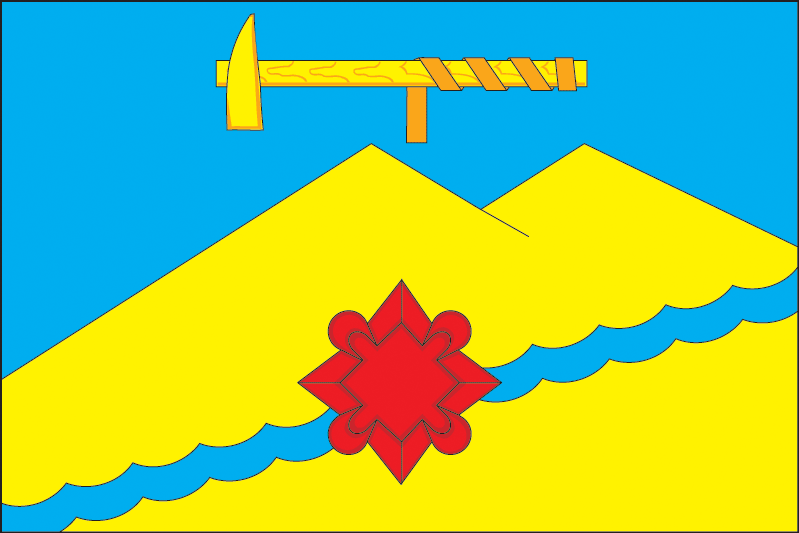
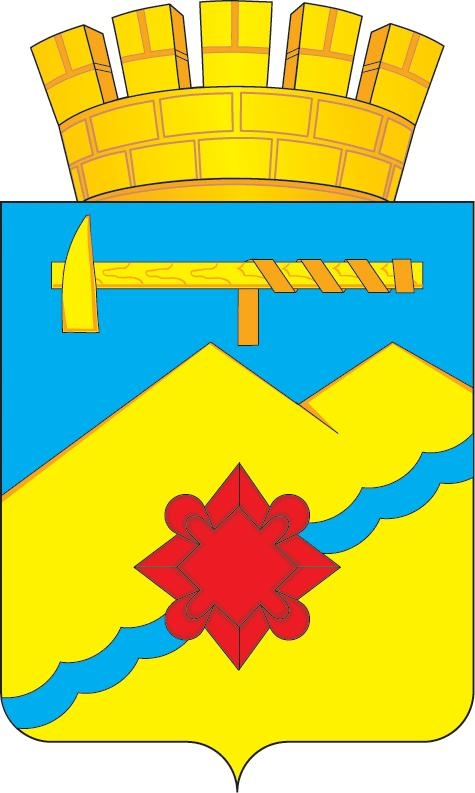
- Flag Coat of arms
- Interactive map of Mednogorsk
- Location of Mednogorsk Mednogorsk (Orenburg Oblast)
- Coordinates: 51°25′20″N 57°35′43″E
- Country: Russia
- Federal subject: Orenburg Oblast
- Founded: 1933
- Town status since: 1939
- Elevation: 350 m (1,150 ft)

Population (2010 Census)
  - Total: 27,292
  - Estimate (1 January 2024): 23,013 (−15.7%)

Administrative status
  - Subordinated to: Town of Mednogorsk
  - Capital of: Town of Mednogorsk

Municipal status
  - Urban okrug: Mednogorsk Urban Okrug
  - Capital of: Mednogorsk Urban Okrug
- Time zone: UTC+5 (MSK+2)
- Postal code: 462270
- Dialing code: +7 35379
- OKTMO ID: 53715000001

Mednogorsk (Russian: Медного́рск) is a town in Orenburg Oblast, Russia. Population: 27,292 (2010 census); 31,369 (2002 census); 34,095 (1989 Soviet census).

== History ==
Settlements at the area were founded in 1933 and the town status was granted in 1939.

== Administrative and municipal status ==
Within the framework of administrative divisions, it is, together with six rural localities, incorporated as the Town of Mednogorsk—an administrative unit with the status equal to that of the districts. As a municipal division, the Town of Mednogorsk is incorporated as Mednogorsk Urban Okrug.
