= Gay, Orenburg Oblast =

Town in Orenburg Oblast, Russia

Gay Гай
- Town
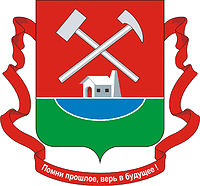
- Coat of arms
- Interactive map of Gay
- Location of Gay Gay (Orenburg Oblast)
- Coordinates: 51°28′04″N 58°26′35″E
- Country: Russia
- Federal subject: Orenburg Oblast
- Founded: 1958
- Town status since: 1979
- Elevation: 380 m (1,250 ft)

Population (2010 Census)
  - Total: 38,301
  - Estimate (1 January 2024): 32,363 (−15.5%)

Administrative status
  - Subordinated to: Town of Gay
  - Capital of: Gaysky District, Town of Gai

Municipal status
  - Urban okrug: Gaysky Urban Okrug
  - Capital of: Gaysky Urban Okrug
- Time zone: UTC+5 (MSK+2)
- Postal codes: 462631, 462633–462635
- OKTMO ID: 53713000001
- Website: www.gy.orb.ru

Population
- 2010 Census: 38,301
- 2002 Census: 41,621
- 1989 Census: 41,668
- 1979 Census: 35,700

Gay, or Gai (Russian: Гай, IPA: [ɡaj]) is a town in Orenburg Oblast, Russia, located 230 kilometers (140 mi) east of Orenburg, the administrative center of the oblast and close to the border with Kazakhstan. As of the 2010 Census, its population was 38,301.

== History ==
Gay was founded in 1958 as an industrial settlement. The town was granted Urban-type settlement status in 1965 and town status in 1979.

== Administrative and municipal status ==
Within the framework of administrative divisions, Gay serves as the administrative center of Gaysky District, even though it is not a part of it. As an administrative division, it is, together with one rural locality (the settlement of Kalinovka), incorporated separately as the Town of Gay—an administrative unit with the status equal to that of the districts. As a municipal division, the territories of the Town of Gay and of Gaysky District are incorporated as Gaysky Urban Okrug. Prior to June 1, 2015, the Town of Gay was incorporated as Gay Urban Okrug, separately from Gaysky Municipal District.

== Coat of arms ==
The coat of arms of Gay states: "Remember the Past. Believe in the Future."

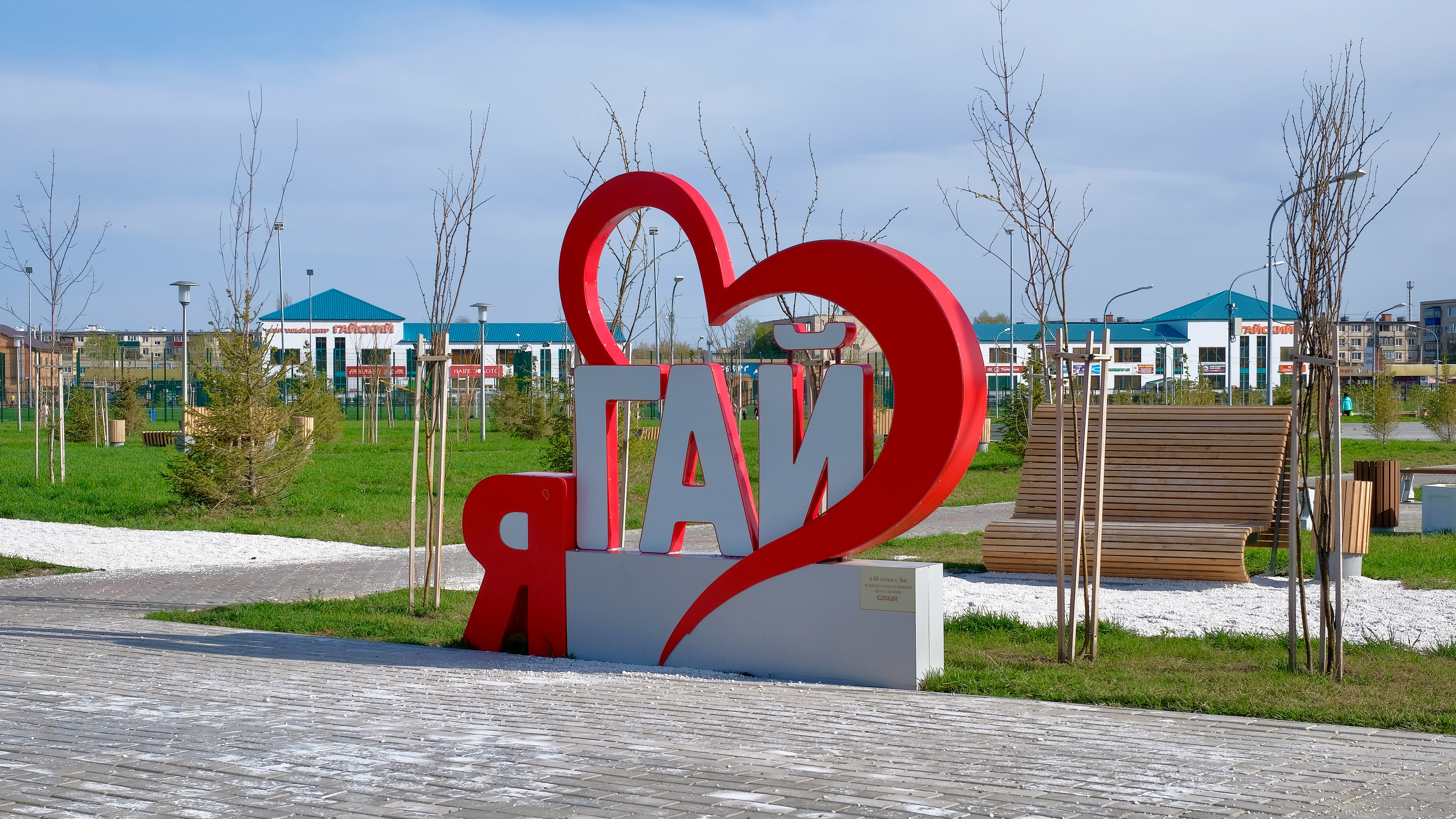
Central Park
