= Kuvandyksky District =

Kuvandyksky District Кувандыкский район (Russian)
- District
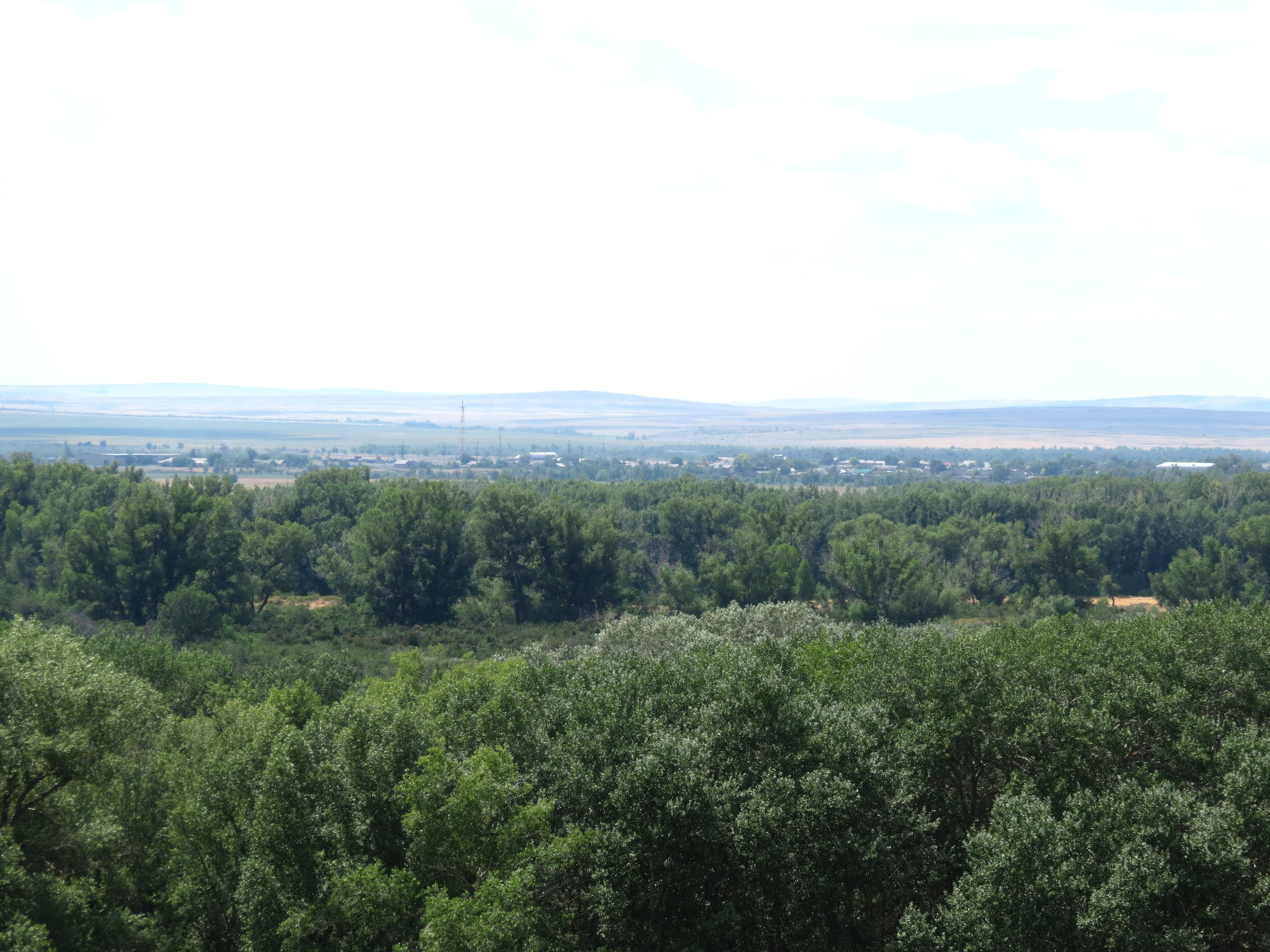
- The selo of Novouralsk in Kuvandyksky District

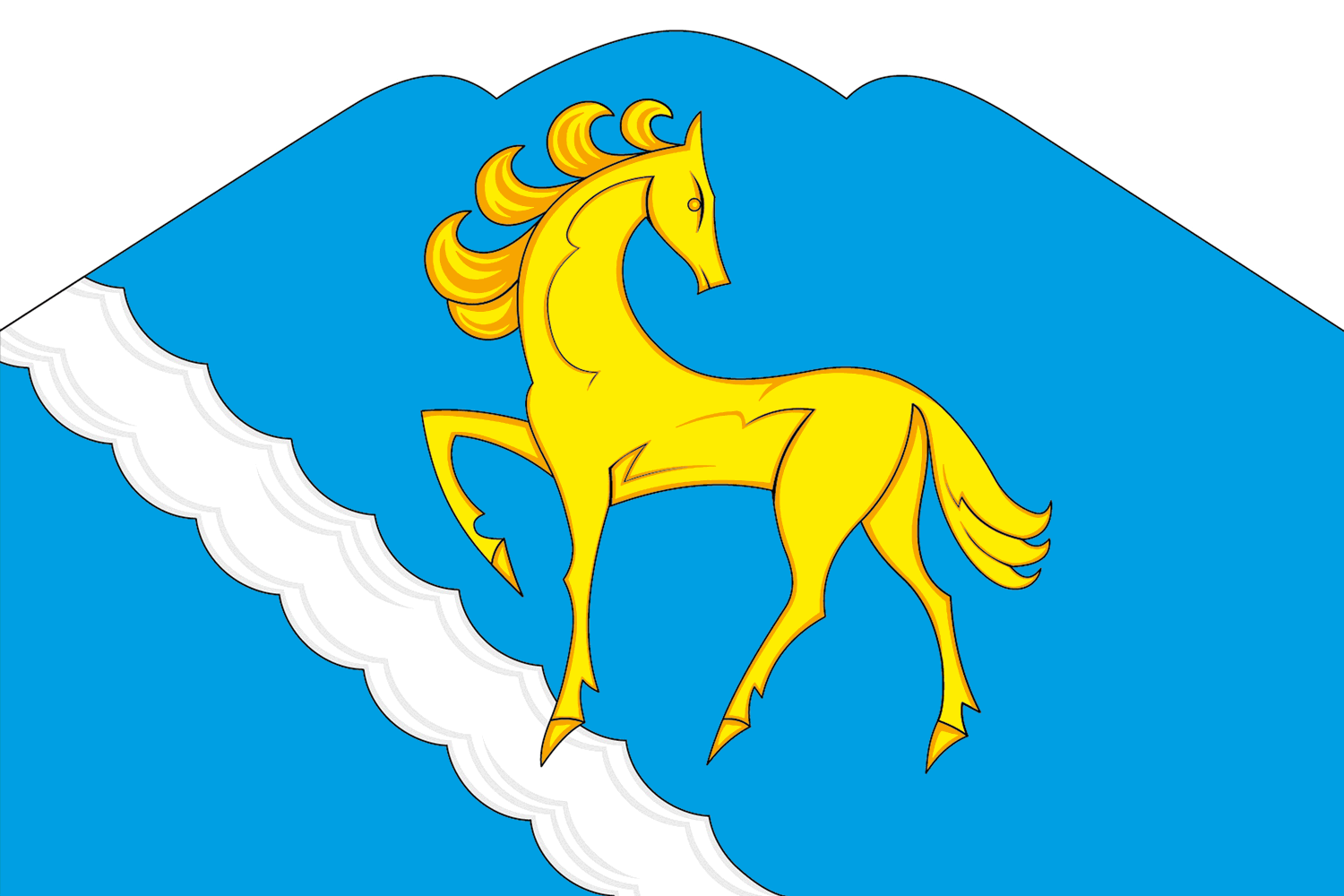
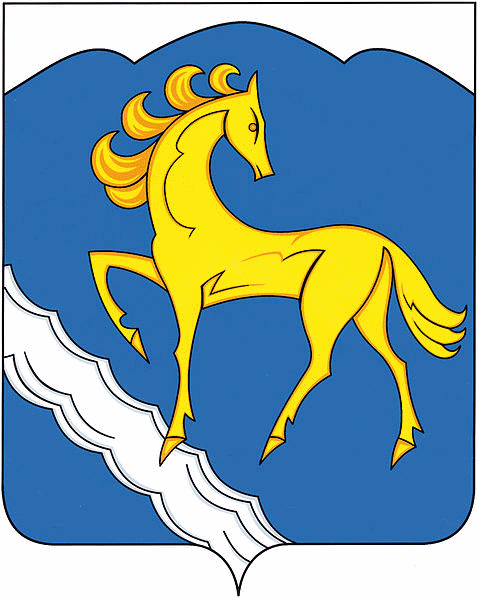
- Flag Coat of arms
- Location of Kuvandyksky District in Orenburg Oblast
- Coordinates: 51°29′N 57°21′E
- Country: Russia
- Federal subject: Orenburg Oblast
- Established: 1935
- Administrative center: Kuvandyk

Area
  - Total: 6,000 km^{2} (2,300 sq mi)

Population (2010 Census)
  - Total: 19,545
  - Density: 3.3/km^{2} (8.4/sq mi)
  - Urban: 0%
  - Rural: 100%

Administrative structure
  - Administrative divisions: 18 Selsoviets
  - Inhabited localities: 79 rural localities

Municipal structure
  - Municipally incorporated as: Kuvandyksky Urban Okrug
- Time zone: UTC+5 (MSK+2)
- OKTMO ID: 53714000
- Website: http://regionkuv.orb.ru

Kuvandyksky District (Russian: Куванды́кский райо́н) is an administrative district (raion), one of the thirty-five in Orenburg Oblast, Russia. The area of the district is 6,000 square kilometers (2,300 sq mi). Its administrative center is the town of Kuvandyk (which is not administratively a part of the district). Population: 19,545 (2010 Census); 24,431 (2002 census); 27,710 (1989 Soviet census).

== Administrative and municipal status ==
Within the framework of administrative divisions, Kuvandyksky District is one of the thirty-five in the oblast. The town of Kuvandyk serves as its administrative center, despite being incorporated separately as an administrative unit with the status equal to that of the districts.

As a municipal division, the territory of the district and the territory of the Town of Kuvandyk are incorporated together as Kuvandyksky Urban Okrug. Prior to May 1, 2015, the district was incorporated as Kuvandyksky Municipal District, with the Town of Kuvandyk being incorporated within it as Kuvandyk Urban Settlement.

== See also ==
- Orenburg corridor
