= Orenburg Oblast =

First-level administrative division of Russia

Orenburg Oblast Оренбургская область (Russian)
- Oblast
- Flag Coat of arms

- Coordinates: 52°08′N 55°36′E
- Country: Russia
- Federal district: Volga
- Economic region: Ural
- Established: 7 December 1934
- Administrative center: Orenburg

Government
  - Body: Legislative Assembly
  - Governor: Yevgeny Solntsev

Area
  - Total: 123,702 km^{2} (47,762 sq mi)
  - Rank: 29th

Population (2021 census)
  - Total: 1,862,767: 74.1% Russians; 6.3% Tatars; 5.8% Kazakhs; 1.9% Bashkirs; 1% Mordvins; 0.9% Ukrainians; 6.4% not stated
  - Estimate (2018): 1,977,720
  - Rank: 24th
  - Density: 15.0585/km^{2} (39.0013/sq mi)
  - Urban: 59.7%
  - Rural: 40.3%

GDP (nominal, 2024)
  - Total: ₽2.07 trillion (US$24.27 billion)
  - Per capita: ₽1.13 million (US$13,310.52)
- Time zone: UTC+5 (MSK+2)
- ISO 3166 code: RU-ORE
- License plates: 56, 156
- OKTMO ID: 53000000
- Official languages: Russian
- Website: http://www.orb.ru/

small coat of arms of Orenburg Oblast

Orenburg Oblast (Note: Russian: Оренбургская область, romanized: Orenburgskaya oblastʹ, IPA: [ɐrʲɪnˈburkskəjə ˈobɫəsʲtʲ]) (also Orenburzhye) is a federal subject of Russia (an oblast), mainly located in Eastern Europe, with some land in the southern and eastern portions of the oblast falling within Asia. Its administrative center is the city of Orenburg. From 1938 to 1957, it bore the name Chkalov Oblast (Note: Russian: Чкаловская область, romanized: Chkalovskaya oblastʹ, IPA: [ˈtɕkaɫəfskəjə ˈobɫəsʲtʲ]) in honor of Valery Chkalov. As of the 2021 Census, the oblast had a population of 1,862,767, down from 2,033,072 in the 2010 Census.

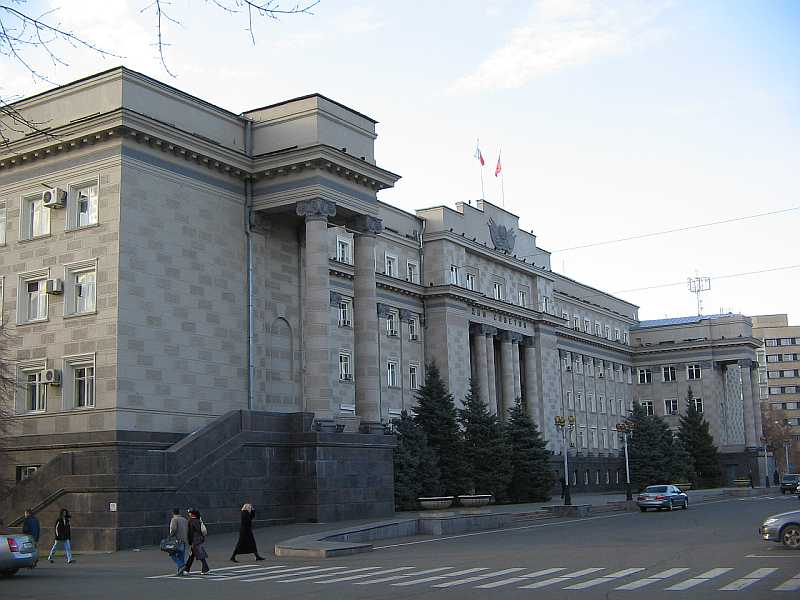
The House of the Soviets (oblast administrative centre)

== Geography ==
Orenburg Oblast's internal borders are with the republics of Bashkortostan and Tatarstan to the north, Chelyabinsk Oblast to the north-east, and with Samara and Saratov oblasts to the west. Orenburg Oblast also shares an international border with Kazakhstan to the east and south. The oblast is situated on the boundary between Europe and Asia. The majority of its territory lies west of the continental divide in European Russia and smaller sections in the east situated on the Asian side of the divide. The most important river of the oblast is the Ural and the largest lake Shalkar-Yega-Kara. Orenburg is traversed by the northeasterly line of equal latitude and longitude. The highest point of the oblast is the 668 m (2,192 ft)-high Nakas.

== History ==
In the first half of the 18th century, the Russian Empire constructed the Irtysh line, a series of 46 forts, including Orenburg, to prevent Kazakh and Dzungar nomads from raiding Russian territory.

Orenburg played a major role in Pugachev's Rebellion (1773–1774), the largest peasant revolt in Russian history.

During the Russian Civil War, the region was heavily affected by the Russian famine of 1921–1922.

During World War II in 1941, the command and staff of the newly formed Polish Anders' Army was based in Buzuluk, and in 1942, the First Czechoslovak Independent Field Battalion was based there. Both formations afterwards fought against Nazi Germany.

On 26 May 2024, a Ukrainian drone attacked the Voronezh M long-range radar station near Orsk.

== Demographics ==
Population: 1,862,767 (2021 census); 2,033,072 (2010 census); 2,179,551 (2002 census); 2,174,459 (1989 Soviet census).

Ethnic composition (2021)

| Ethnic group | Population | Percentage |
|---|---|---|
| Russians | 1,380,674 | 79.3% |
| Tatars | 116,605 | 6.7% |
| Kazakhs | 107,734 | 6.2% |
| Bashkirs | 36,181 | 2.1% |
| Mordvins | 18,300 | 1.1% |
| Ukrainians | 16,639 | 1.0% |
| Others | 65,056 | 3.7% |
| Ethnicity not stated | 121,578 | — |

Vital statistics for 2024:

- Births: 15,366 (8.4 per 1,000)
- Deaths: 26,368 (14.5 per 1,000)

Total fertility rate (2024):
1.47 children per woman

Life expectancy (2021):
Total — 68.21 years (male — 63.91, female — 72.48)

=== Settlements ===
Largest cities or towns in Orenburg Oblast 2010 Russian Census
| Rank | | Administrative Division | Pop. |
|---|---|---|---|
| 1 | Orenburg | Orenburgsky District | 548,331 |
| 2 | Orsk | City of oblast significance of Orsk | 239,800 |
| 3 | Novotroitsk | Town of oblast significance of Novotroitsk | 98,173 |
| 4 | Buzuluk | Buzuluksky District | 82,904 |
| 5 | Buguruslan | Buguruslansky District | 49,741 |
| 6 | Gay | Gaysky District | 38,301 |
| 7 | Sorochinsk | Sorochinsky District | 29,249 |
| 8 | Sol-Iletsk | Sol-Iletsky District | 28,377 |
| 9 | Mednogorsk | Town of oblast significance of Mednogorsk | 27,292 |
| 10 | Kuvandyk | Kuvandyksky District | 26,169 |

=== Religion ===
Religion in Orenburg Oblast as of 2012 (Sreda Arena Atlas)
| Russian Orthodoxy | 40.2% |
| Other Orthodox | 1.7% |
| Other Christians | 3.6% |
| Islam | 13.8% |
| Rodnovery and other native faiths | 3% |
| Spiritual but not religious | 20% |
| Atheism and irreligion | 12.4% |
| Other and undeclared | 5.3% |

As of a 2012 survey, 40.2% of the population of Orenburg Oblast adheres to the Russian Orthodox Church, 3% declare themselves to be generic nondenominational Christians (excluding the Protestant definition), 2% are Orthodox Christian believers who do not belong to any church or belong to non-Russian Orthodox churches. Muslims constitute 13% of the population. 3% of the population are followers of the Slavic native faith (Rodnovery), 6.8% are followers of other religions or did not give an answer to the survey. In addition, 20% of the population declares to be "spiritual but not religious" and 12% to be atheist.

Historical population
| Year | Pop. | ±% |
|---|---|---|
| 1897 | 1,600,145 | — |
| 1926 | 1,492,211 | −6.7% |
| 1939 | 1,675,000 | +12.2% |
| 1959 | 1,829,481 | +9.2% |
| 1970 | 2,049,976 | +12.1% |
| 1979 | 2,088,553 | +1.9% |
| 1989 | 2,174,459 | +4.1% |
| 2002 | 2,179,551 | +0.2% |
| 2010 | 2,033,072 | −6.7% |
| 2021 | 1,862,767 | −8.4% |
Source: Census data

== Economy ==
Orenburg Oblast is one of the major agricultural areas of Russia. Its climate is favorable to farming with a humid spring, dry summer and many sunny days, which make perfect conditions for cultivating hard wheat and rye, sunflowers, potatoes, peas, beans, corn, and gourds.

The range of the oblast's export commodities includes oil and oil products, gas and gas produced products, rolled ferrous and non-ferrous metals, nickel, asbestos, chromium compounds, rough copper, electric engines, and radiators, which are used to make products from the machine-building industry.

== See also ==
- Ashchebutak (air base)
- List of Chairmen of the Legislative Assembly of Orenburg Oblast
- Black Dolphin Prison
