= Burba =

- Lithuanian surname
- m.: Burba
- f.: (unmarried): Burbaitė
- f.: (married): Burbienė

Burba is a Lithuanian surname.

Notable people with this surname include:

- Aleksander Burba (1918–1984), Soviet scholar
- Barbora Burbaitė-Eidukevičienė
- Dave Burba (born 1966), American baseball player
- Edwin H. Burba Jr. (born 1936), American general
- George Burba, American academic
- Hans-Joachim Burba (born 1957), German curler
- Jonas Burba (1907–1952), Lithuanian artist
- Nathan Burba, co-founder of Survios
- Simona Burbaitė, Miss Lithuania representative
- Vladas Burba (born 1966), Lithuanian judoka
- Wolfgang Burba (born 1960), German curler and coach

== See also ==
- Buurba, the title of the rulers of the Jolof Empire
