= Orenburg =

Administrative centre of Orenburg Oblast, Russia

Orenburg Оренбург
- City
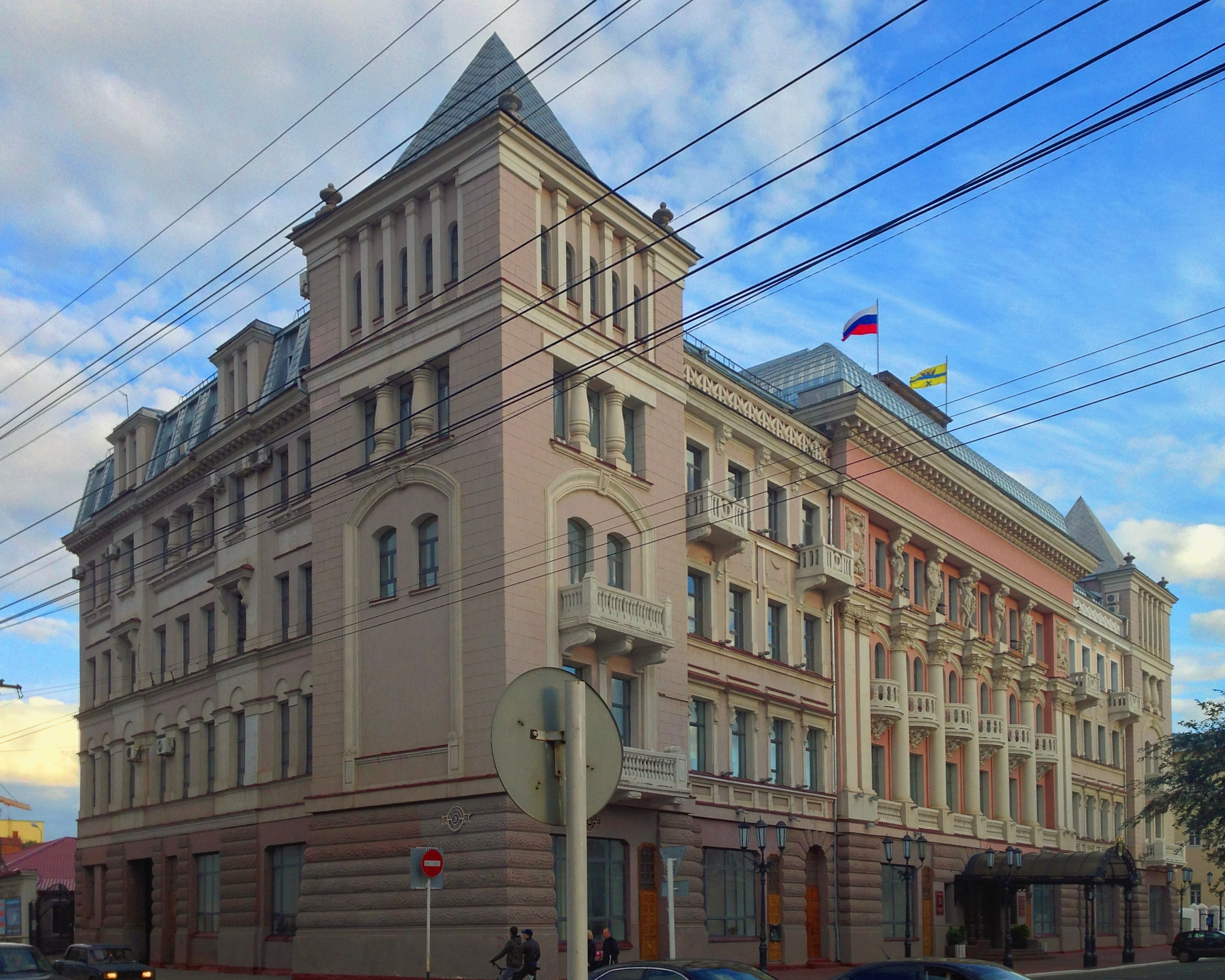
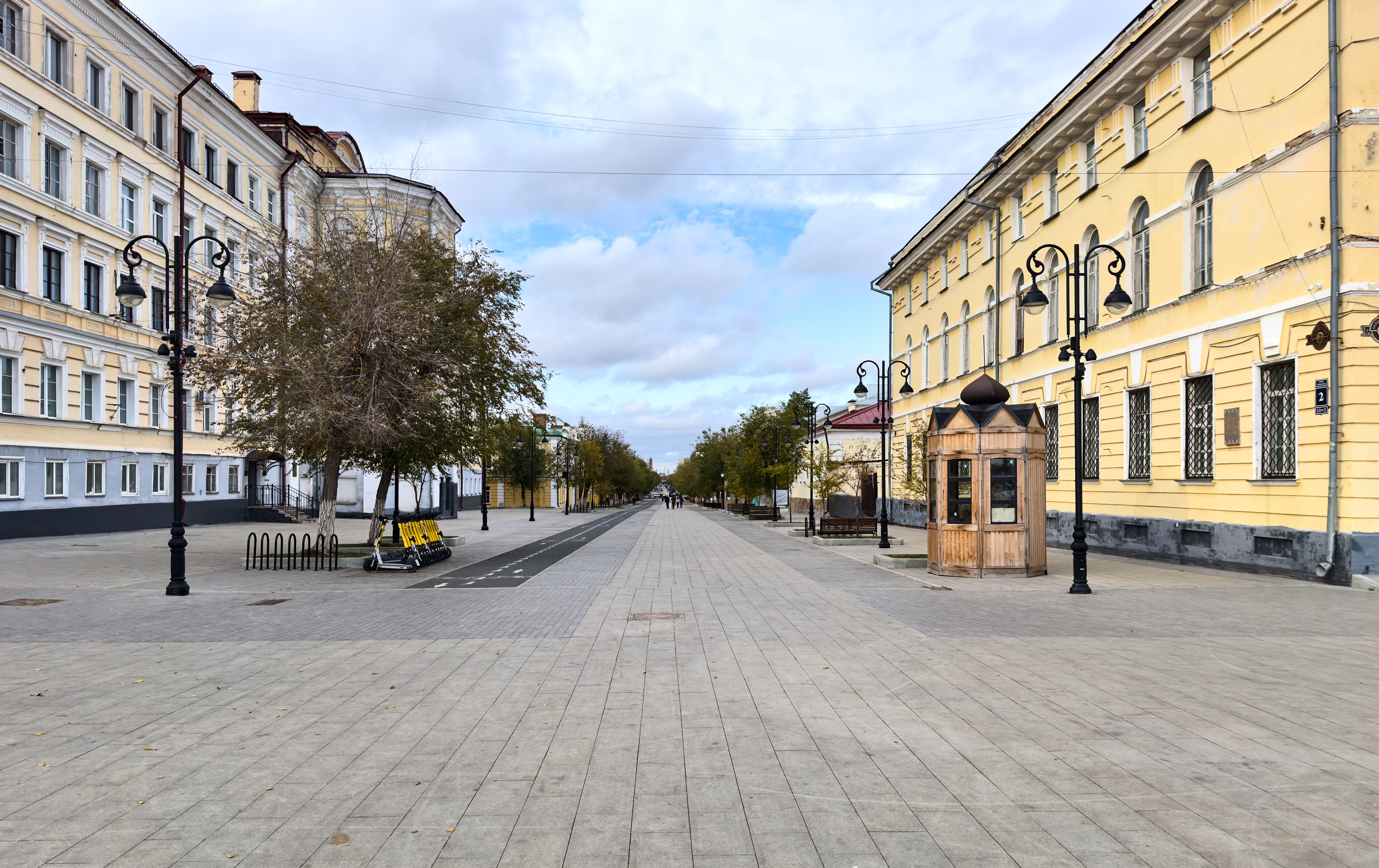
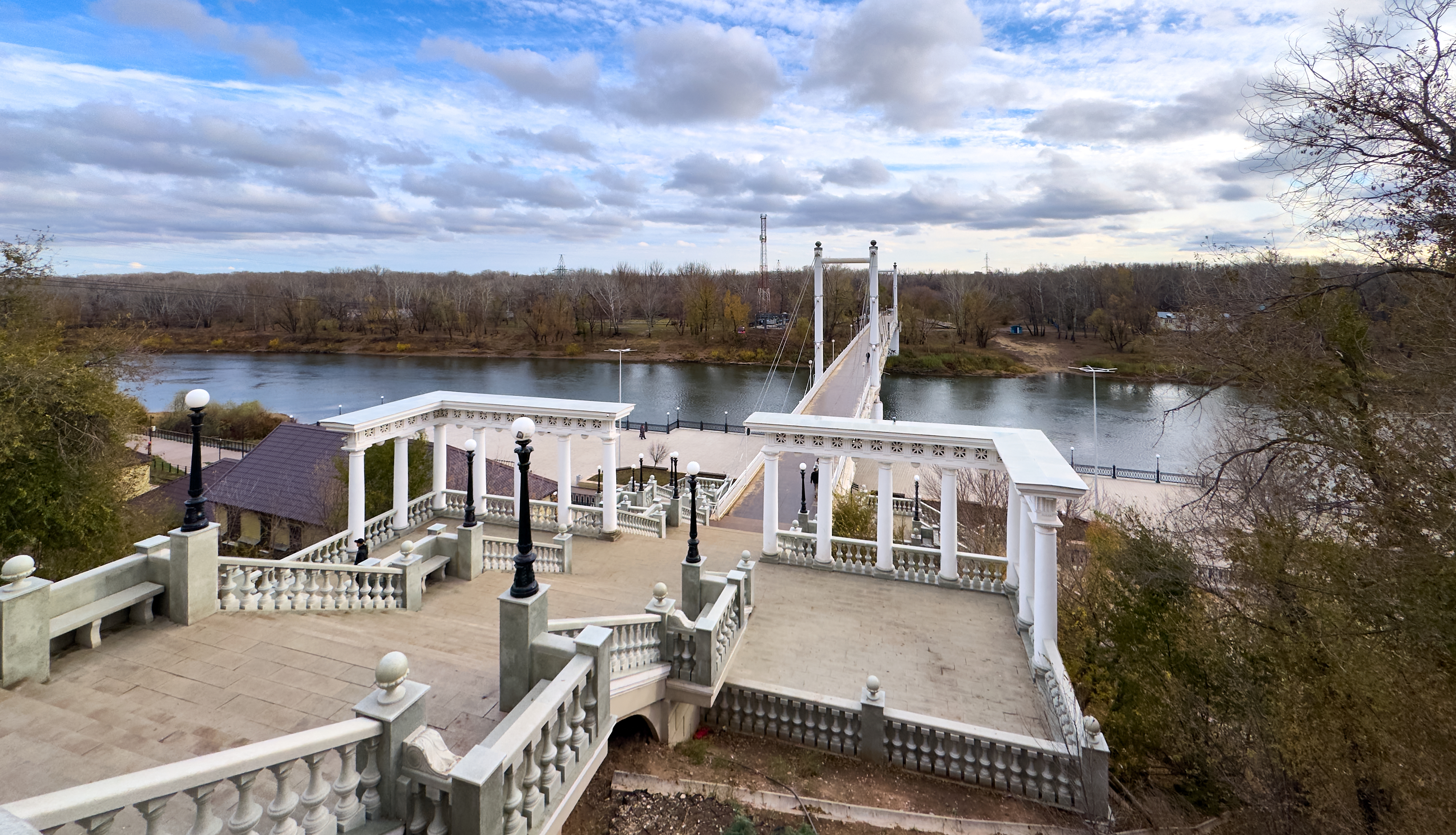
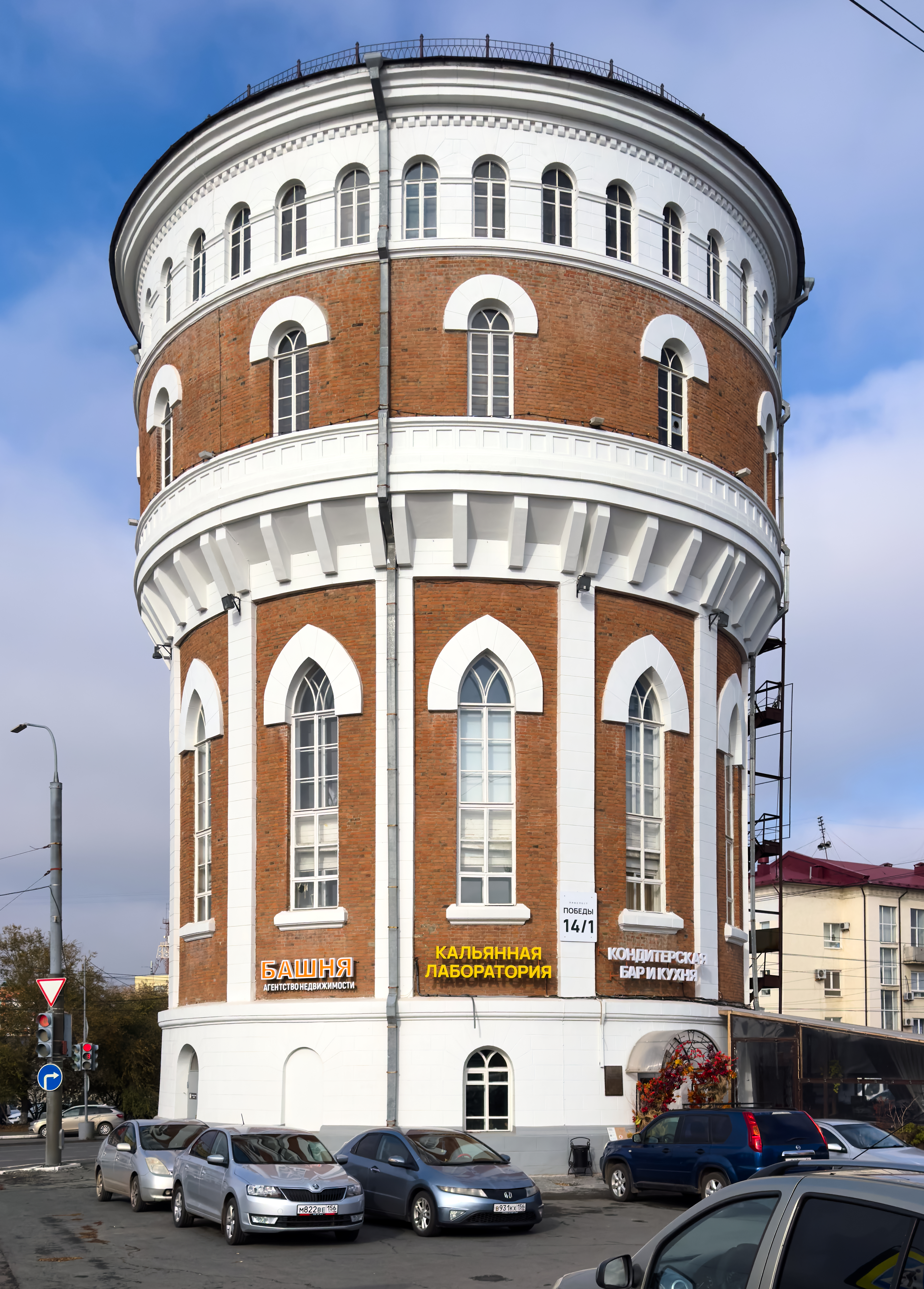
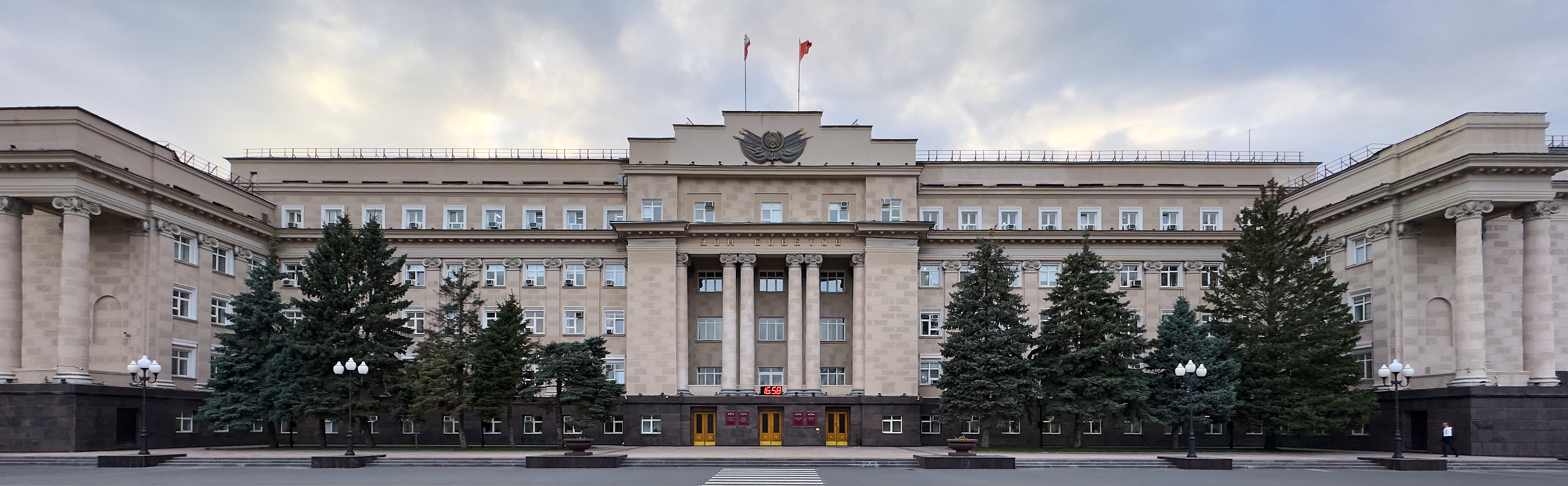
- City Hall Sovetskaya Street Pedestrian bridge over the Ural River Water tower Regional administration building

- Flag Coat of arms
- Interactive map of Orenburg
- Location of Orenburg Orenburg (European Russia) Orenburg (Russia) Orenburg (Europe)
- Coordinates: 51°47′N 55°06′E
- Country: Russia
- Federal subject: Orenburg Oblast
- Founded: 1743

Government
  - Body: City Duma
  - Head: Sergey Salmin

Area
  - Total: 258.57 km^{2} (99.83 sq mi)
- Elevation: 150 m (490 ft)

Population (2010 Census)
  - Total: 548,331
  - Estimate (2025): 536,515 (−2.2%)
  - Rank: 28th in 2010
  - Density: 2,120.6/km^{2} (5,492.4/sq mi)

Administrative status
  - Subordinated to: City of Orenburg
  - Capital of: Orenburg Oblast, Orenburgsky District

Municipal status
  - Urban okrug: Orenburg Urban Okrug
  - Capital of: Orenburg Urban Okrug, Orenburgsky Municipal District
- Time zone: UTC+5 (MSK+2)
- Postal code: 460000
- Dialing code: +7 3532
- OKTMO ID: 53701000001
- Website: orenburg.ru

Orenburg (Russian: Оренбу́рг, pronounced [ɐrʲɪnˈburk], Kazakh: Орынбор, romanized: Orynbor), formerly known as Chkalov (1938–1957), is the administrative center of Orenburg Oblast, Russia. It lies in Eastern Europe, near the boundary of Europe and Asia, along the banks of the Ural River, being approximately 1,480 kilometers (920 mi) southeast of Moscow.

Orenburg is close to the border with Kazakhstan. Founded in the 18th century, the city was an important place for Kazakh–Russian trade in the 19th century, the founding place of the first two Kazakh republics in the 20th century, and then the first capital of the Kazakh ASSR from 1920 to 1925.

== Etymology ==
Several historians have tried to explain the origins of the city's name. It was traditionally accepted that the word "orenburg" means a fortress on the River Or. In all probability, the word combination "orenburg" was proposed by I. K. Kirillov, the founder of the city. In 1734, in accordance with his project, a package of governmental documents was worked out. This was the starting point for Orenburg as a fortress city near the meeting of the Or and Ural rivers.

On 7 June 1734, "A Privilege for Orenburg" (tsar's edict) was ordered by Empress Anna Ioannovna.

While the construction site of the main fortress changed many times (down the River Ural), the name "Orenburg" has not changed since its founding in 1743. Between 1938 and 1957, the city was referred to as Chkalov, named after the famous Soviet pilot Valery Chkalov, although he was not born in and never lived in Orenburg, and never visited Orenburg. In 1954, Chkalov's five-meter bronze sculpture was erected on the occasion of his 50th birth anniversary; this was installed on a seven-meter pedestal on the Boulevard (the riverside promenade of the city, commonly named "Belovka").

== History ==
=== Foundation and early history ===
In 1734, the Russian Empire began to expand its dominance and influence in Asia by building a fortified city called Orenburg on its eastern border (Southern Urals). For this purpose, in 1735, Ivan Kirilov, a cartographer and statistician, began to develop the settlement at the confluence of the rivers Or and Ural, and the first settlement was chosen during his expedition. He claimed that the town was needed "to open a transit route to Bukhara, Badakhshan, Balkh and India" and that "riches in the form of gold, lapis lazuli and garnets could be obtained from it". After his death, a new manager of the Orenburg expedition, Vasily Tatishchev, was appointed who did not consider the place suitable for building a city. Therefore, in 1739 he began preparations for the construction of a new town with the old name on Krasnaya Gora (Red Mountain), downstream of the Ural (Yaik) River. The old settlement was named the Orsk fortress (now the city of Orsk).

On 6 August 1741, the new town was laid out. However, its construction never started. The place on Krasnaya Gora was not suitable for the construction of the city, as it was treeless, rocky and far from the river. A new manager of the Orenburg expedition Ivan Neplyuev was appointed, and on 19 April 1743, Orenburg was built up on the third attempt, at the place where the Berd settlement was earlier located, 75 kilometers (47 mi) from the Krasnaya Gora. In the summer of 1742, Neplyuev was assigned to build the city on the site of the rivers Yaik and Sakmara. The new place, surrounded by forests and fields where the Yaik and Sakumara rivers converge, was chosen by Neplyuev himself. Today it is the historical center of the city. The town built on the Red Mountain was named Krasnogorsk. Thus, in 1743 Ivan Neplyuev founded Orenburg on thesite of present-day Orsk, about 250 kilometers west of the Urals. This third Orenburg served as an important military outpost on the border with the nomadic Kazakhs. It became the center of the Orenburg Cossacks. In the first half of the 18th century, the Russian Empire constructed the Irtysh line, a series of forty-six forts, including Orenburg, to prevent Kazakh and Dzungar raids into Russian territory.

Orenburg played a major role in Pugachev's Rebellion (1773–1774), the largest peasant revolt in Russian history. At the time, it was the capital of a vast district and the seat of the governor. Yemelyan Pugachev besieged the city and its fortress from nearby Berda from October 1773 to 26 March 1774. The defense was organized by Governor of Orenburg lieutenant-general Reinsdorf. General Golytsin defeated Pugachev at Berda, and later again at Kargala (north of Orenburg). Most of the city was left in ruins, and thousands of inhabitants had died in the siege. Government forces crushed revolt towards the end of 1774 by General Michelsohn at Tsaritsyn. Further reprisals against rebel areas were carried out by General Peter Panin. In 1786, a border court was established in Orenburg.

=== Late modern period ===
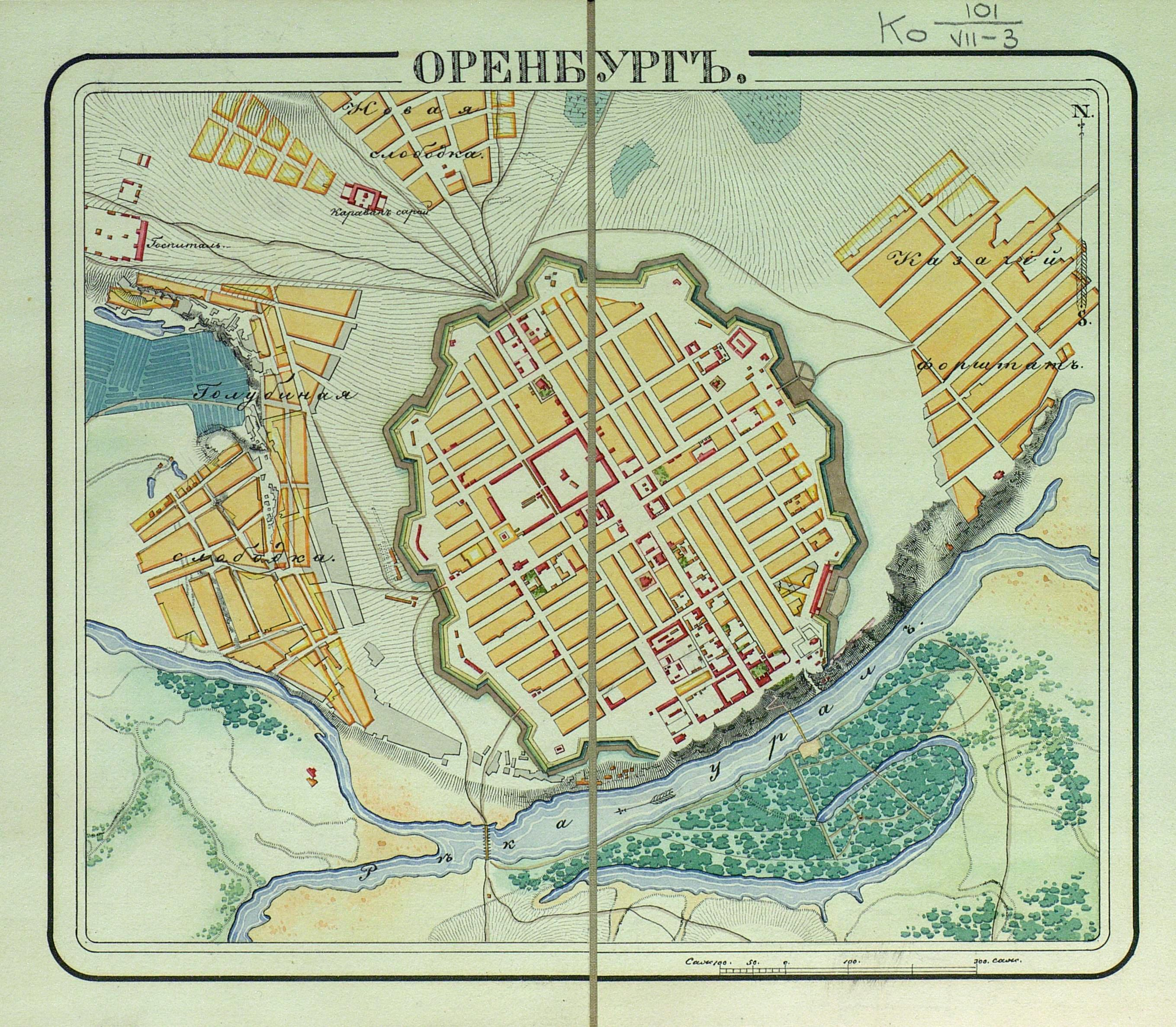
Map of Orenburg in 1828

Alexander Pushkin visited Orenburg in 1833 during a research trip for his books The History of Pugachev and his famous novel The Captain's Daughter. He met his friend Vladimir Dal here, who would later write the first serious dictionary of the Russian language.

Around 300 Polish insurgents of the November Uprising were exiled in Orenburg in the 1830s. Orenburg was the base for General Perovsky's expeditions against the Khanate of Khiva in the 1830s through 1850s. In 1841, Makhambet Otemisuly, Kazakh poet and resistance fighter against the Russian conquest of Kazakhstan, was brought to Orenburg to stand trial before a Russian court; he was released but barred from crossing the border.

The city was an important center for Kazakh–Russian trade. The Kazakhs sold raw hides, furs, wool, linen, cotton fabrics, dressing gowns, belts and sheep, and bought grain. It was also the center of trade with Bukhara and Khiva. Jäñgir-Kerei Khan, the last Khan of the Kazakh Bukey Horde, owned a trading post in Orenburg.

In the mid-19th century, Vasily Vasilyevich Grigoryev, historian specializing in the history of Kazakhstan, established a large library in the city, dedicated to the history of Central Asia.

After the incorporation of Central Asia into the Russian Empire, Orenburg became a trading station and, since the completion of the Trans-Aral Railway, a prominent railway junction en route to the new Central Asian possessions and to Siberia. By 1885, the city had twelve Orthodox churches, five mosques, a Catholic church (built by the Poles) and a Lutheran church. There was a military school, a school for Kazakh children, a women's educational institution, an armoury, a public garden, and 38 factories. In 1910, a women's madrasa was established for Kazakh, Bashkir, Tatar and Uzbek women.

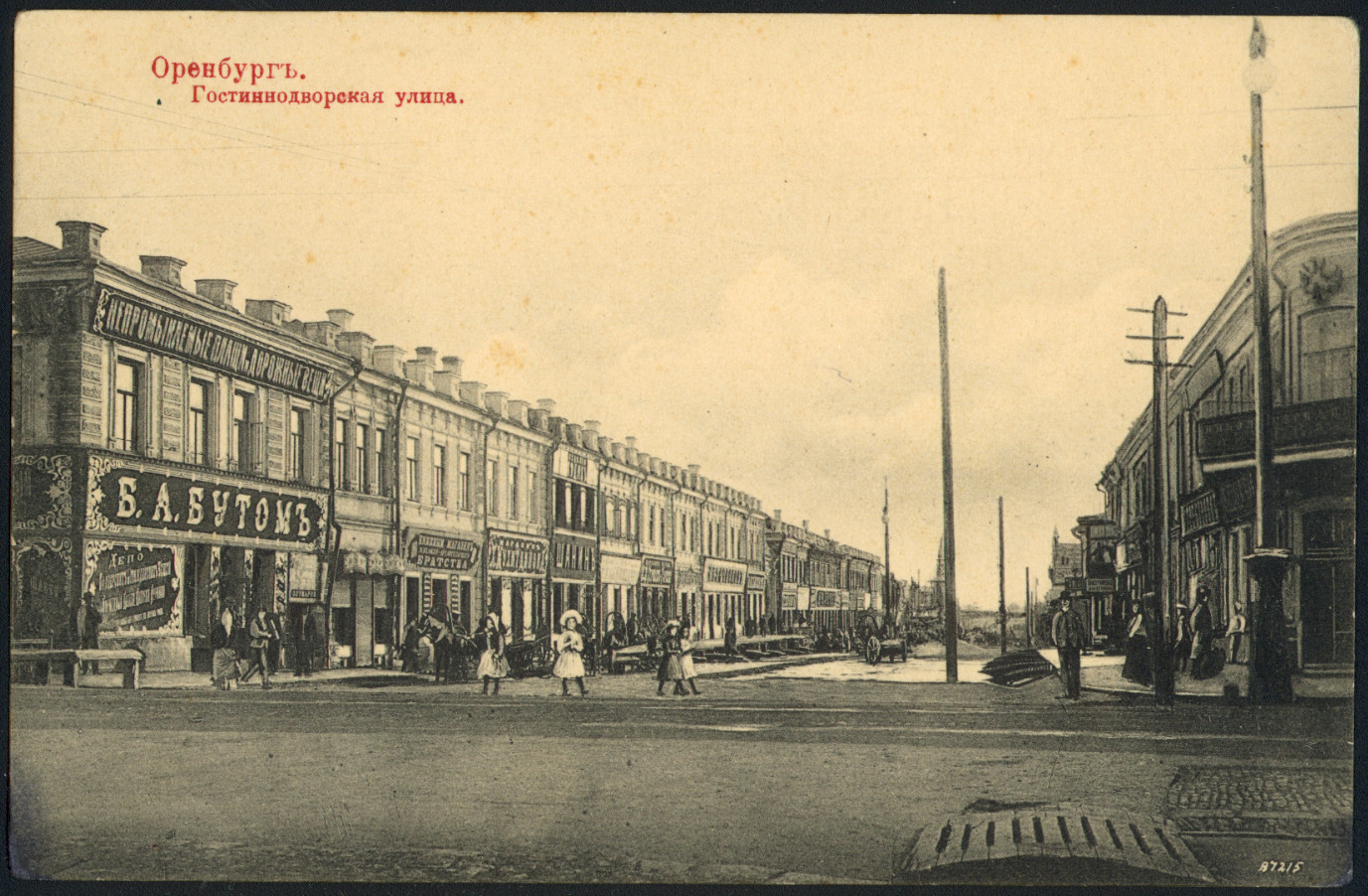
Orenburg in 1910

Orenburg was one of the main centers for the publication of books by the Kazakh intelligentsia, including poetry and works of Mirjaqip Dulatuli and Gumar Karash. Kazakh press was published in Orenburg, i.e. the prominent newspaper Qazaq from 1913 to 1918, then the Kazakh Mungi newspaper from April to July 1918, and the Egemen Qazaqstan newspaper from December 1919.

During World War I, several hundred Poles who had been interned by the Russians in Warsaw were sent to Orenburg. During the Russian Civil War, Soviet power was first established in the city in 1917. On 27 October 1917, Alexander Dutov led an anti-communist uprising, which was suppressed by the Bolsheviks. On 3 July 1918, the city was captured by anti-communist forces of Alexander Dutov.

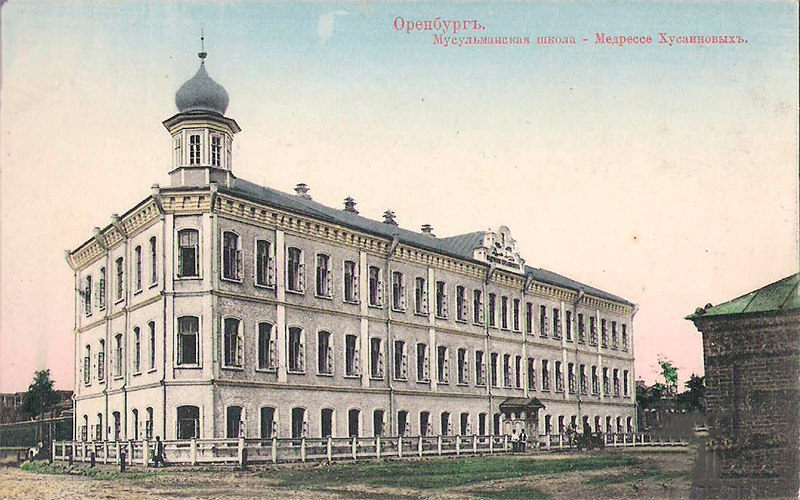
Madrasa in the 1910s, later the Tatar Pedagogical Technical School

In November 1917, autonomous Bashkiria was proclaimed in Orenburg. In February 1918, leader of the Bashkir national liberation movement Zeki Velidi Togan was arrested in Orenburg by the Bolsheviks, but was later freed by the Whites.

In December 1917, Orenburg hosted the Second All-Kazakh Congress, at which the Alash Autonomy, the first Kazakh state since Russian conquest of the Kazakh Khanate, was proclaimed. Also, the armed forces of the Alash Autonomy were founded at the congress.

Tatar and Bashkir Institutes of Public Education were established in 1917 and 1920, respectively, both soon converted into the Tatar and Bashkir Pedagogical Technical Schools.

=== Kazakh capital ===
In 1920, Orenburg (or Orynbor in Kazakh) became the first capital of the Kazakh Autonomous Socialist Soviet Republic (initially named the Kirghiz Autonomous Socialist Soviet Republic). In October 1920, the Constituent Congress of the Soviets of the Kazakh ASSR was held in the city, and the Central Executive Committee of the Kazakh ASSR was elected and the Revolutionary Committee was established.

The Kazakh Institute of Public Education, the Kazakh state publishing house and the Kazakh Bureau of the Central Committee of the Komsomol were founded in Orenburg in 1919–1920, and the first conference of the latter was held in the city in 1921. New Kazakh newspapers and magazines were founded in the city, including the youth magazines Örten and Jas Alaş in 1922 and 1923, respectively, and the Jas Kairat newspaper in 1925. On 13–18 June 1924, the First Congress of Kazakh Scholars was held in the city, with the participation of Ahmet Baitursynuly, Alikhan Bukeikhanov and Mirjaqip Dulatuli, at which key decisions were made, that shaped the course of Kazakh science, literature, and education for decades to come. Among these was the reform of the Kazakh alphabet, which boosted mass printing of Kazakh books, newspapers and textbooks. In 1925, the Kazakh capital was moved to Kyzylorda, and Orenburg was separated from Kazakhstan and has been part of Russia ever since.

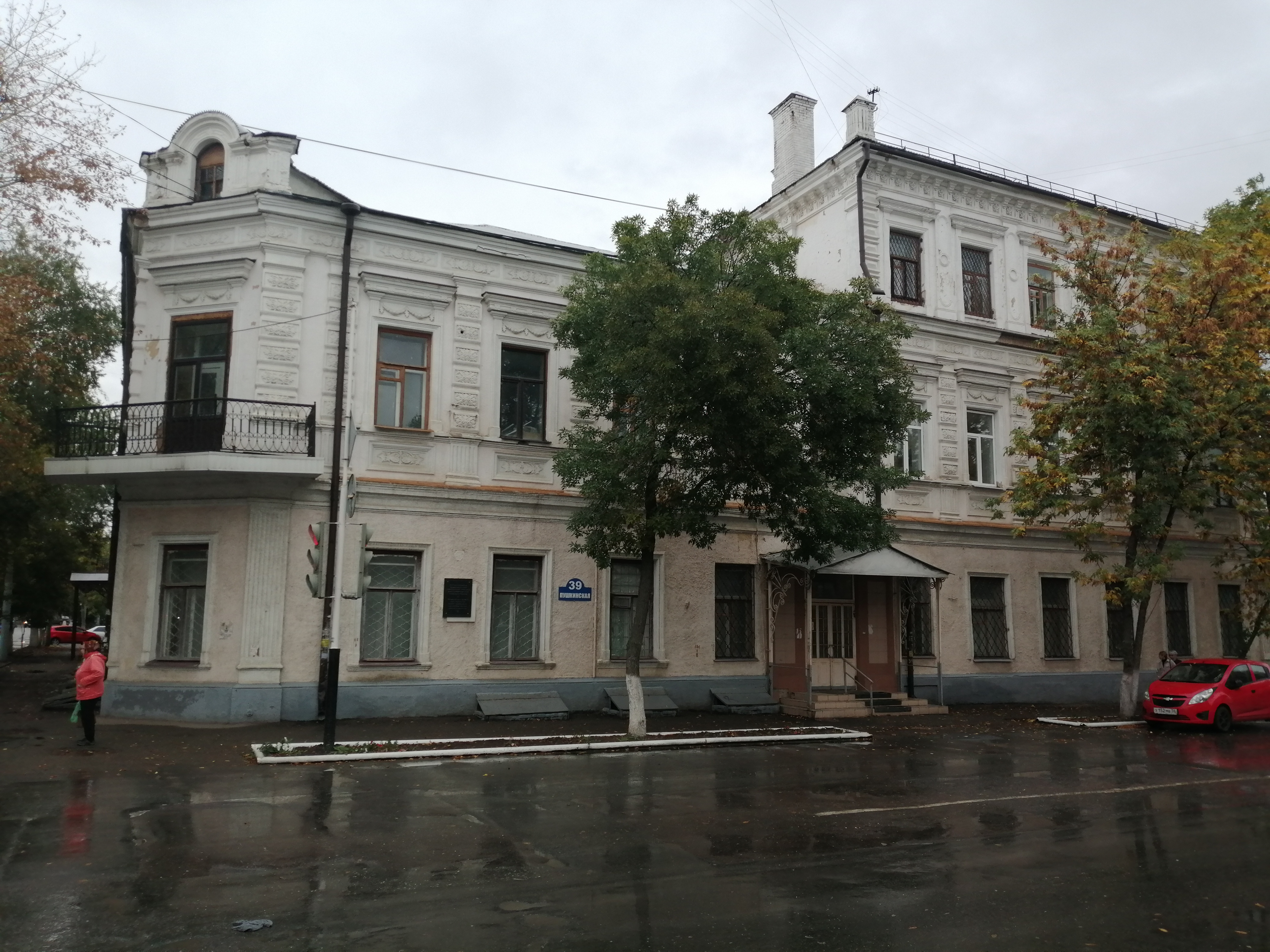
Location of the Second All-Kazakh Congress in 1917, at which the Alash Autonomy was proclaimed.

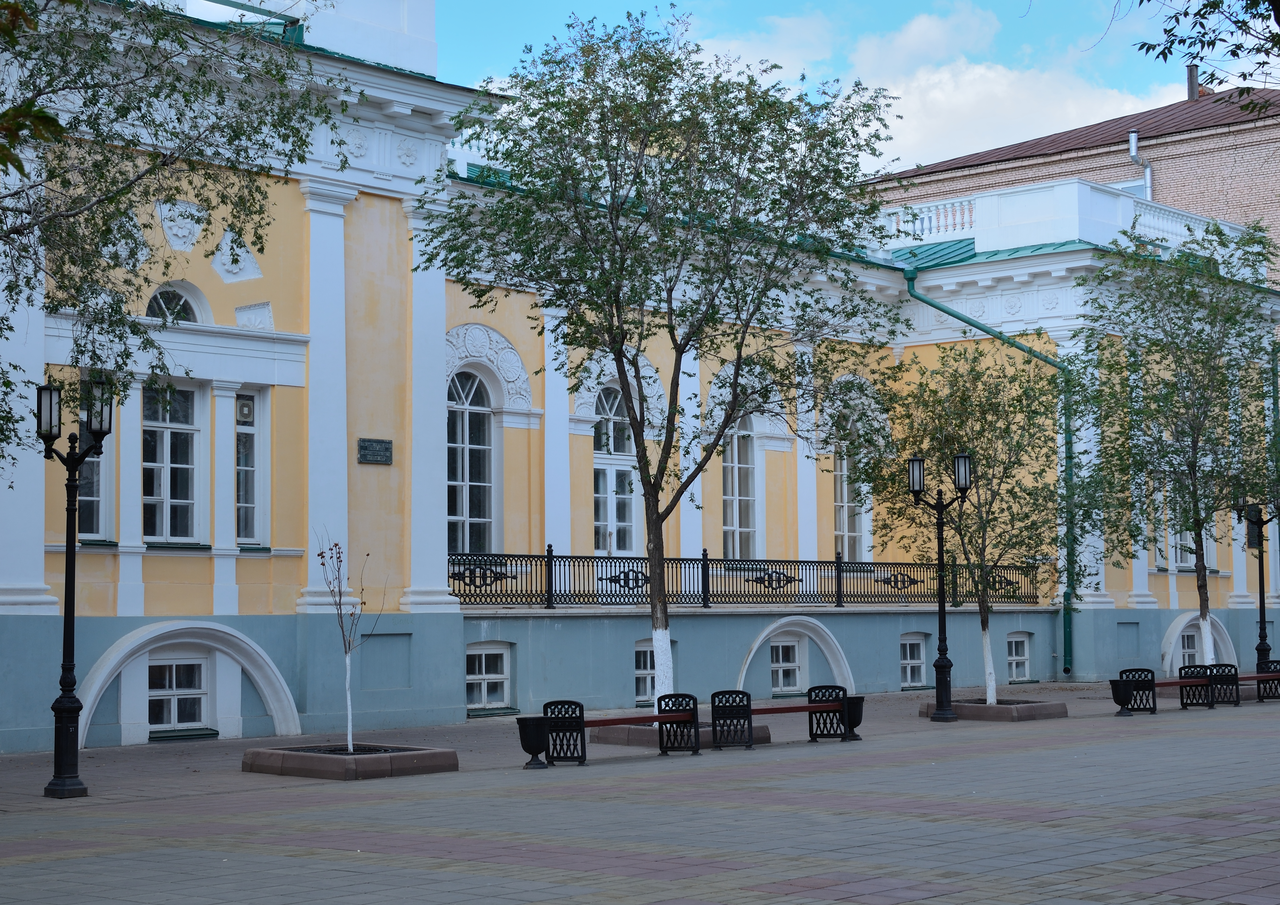
Location of the first Constituent Congress of the Soviets of the Kazakh ASSR in 1920, at which the Kazakh Autonomous Socialist Soviet Republic was proclaimed.

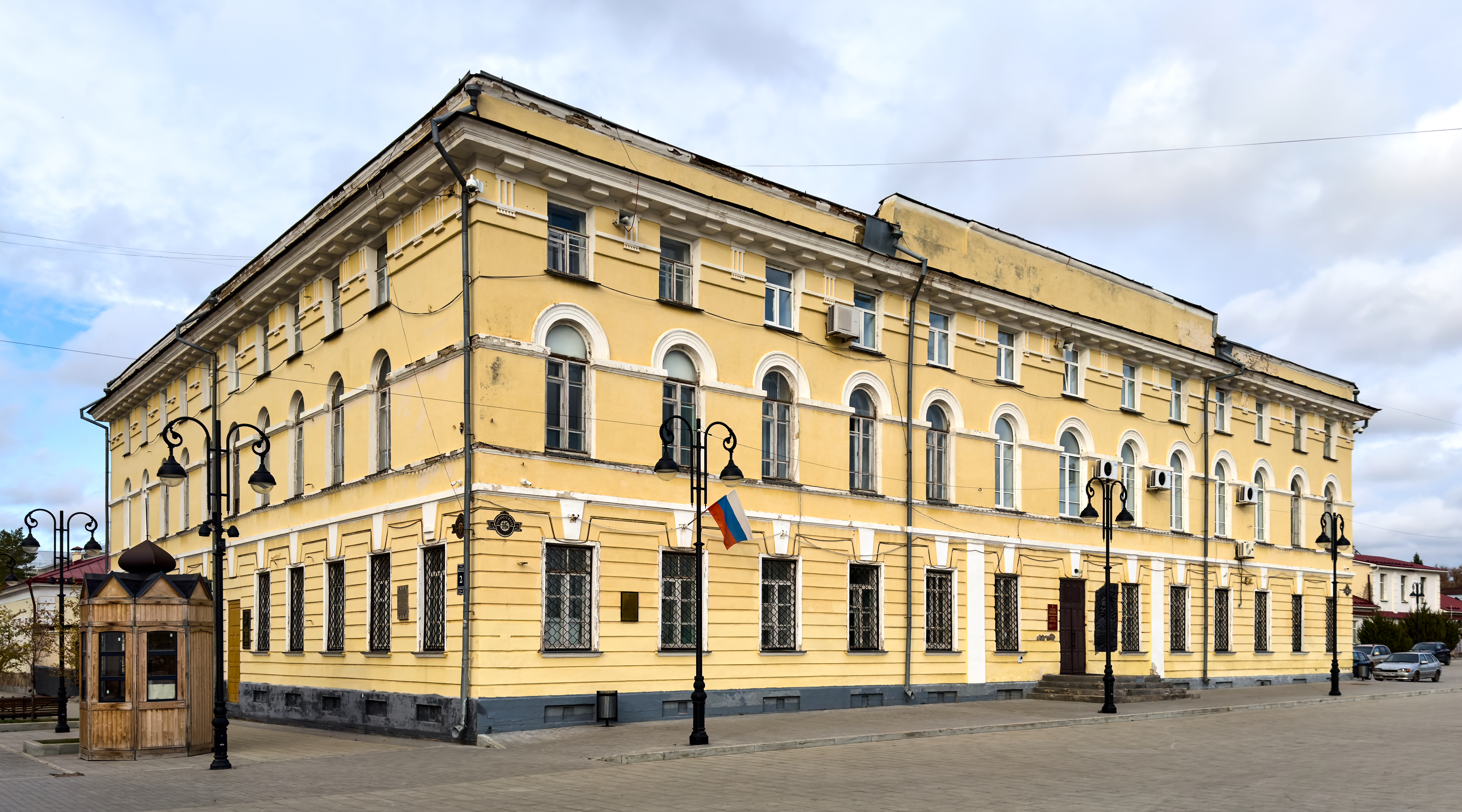
Former Kazakh Central Election Commission

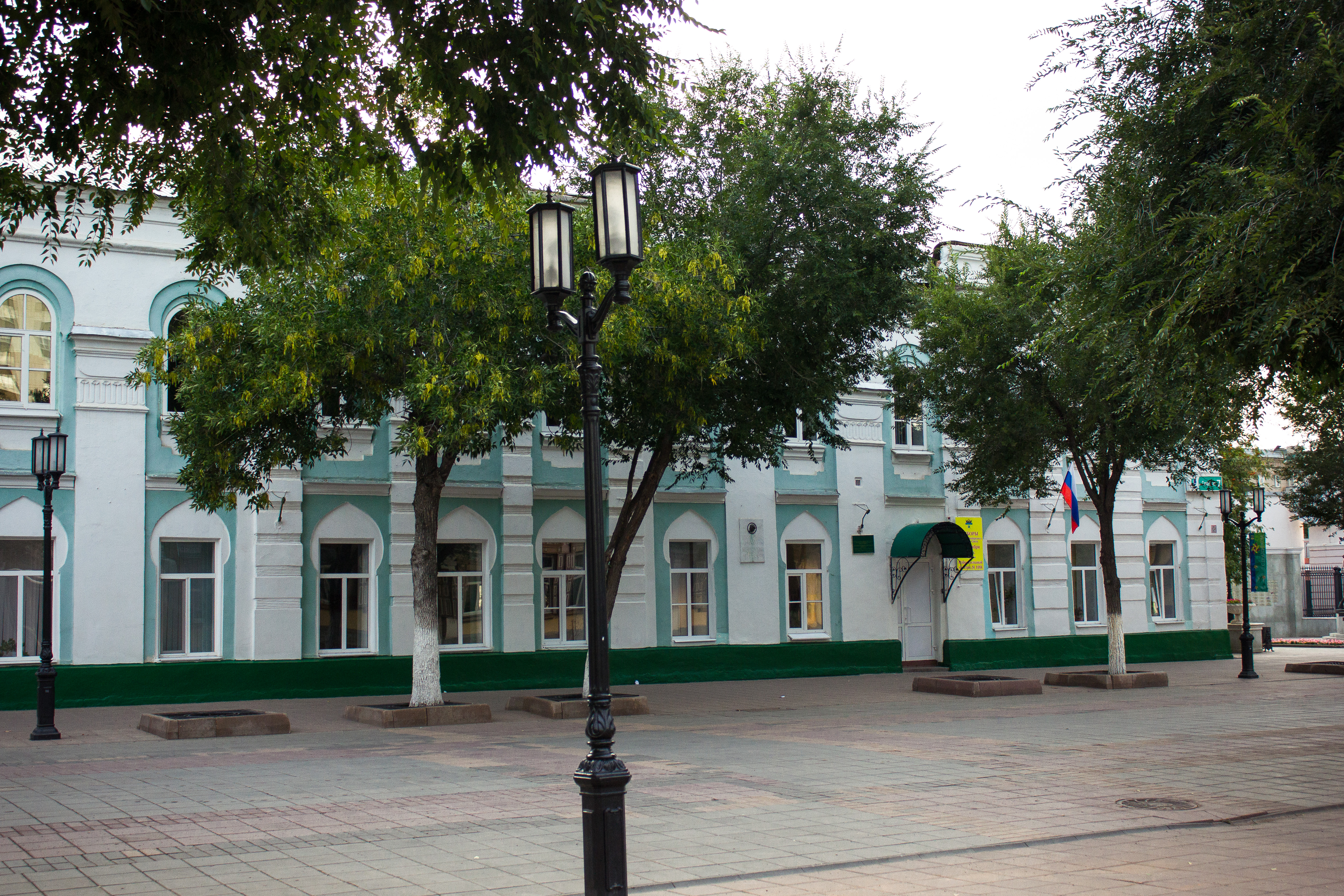
Former Kazakh Institute of Public Education

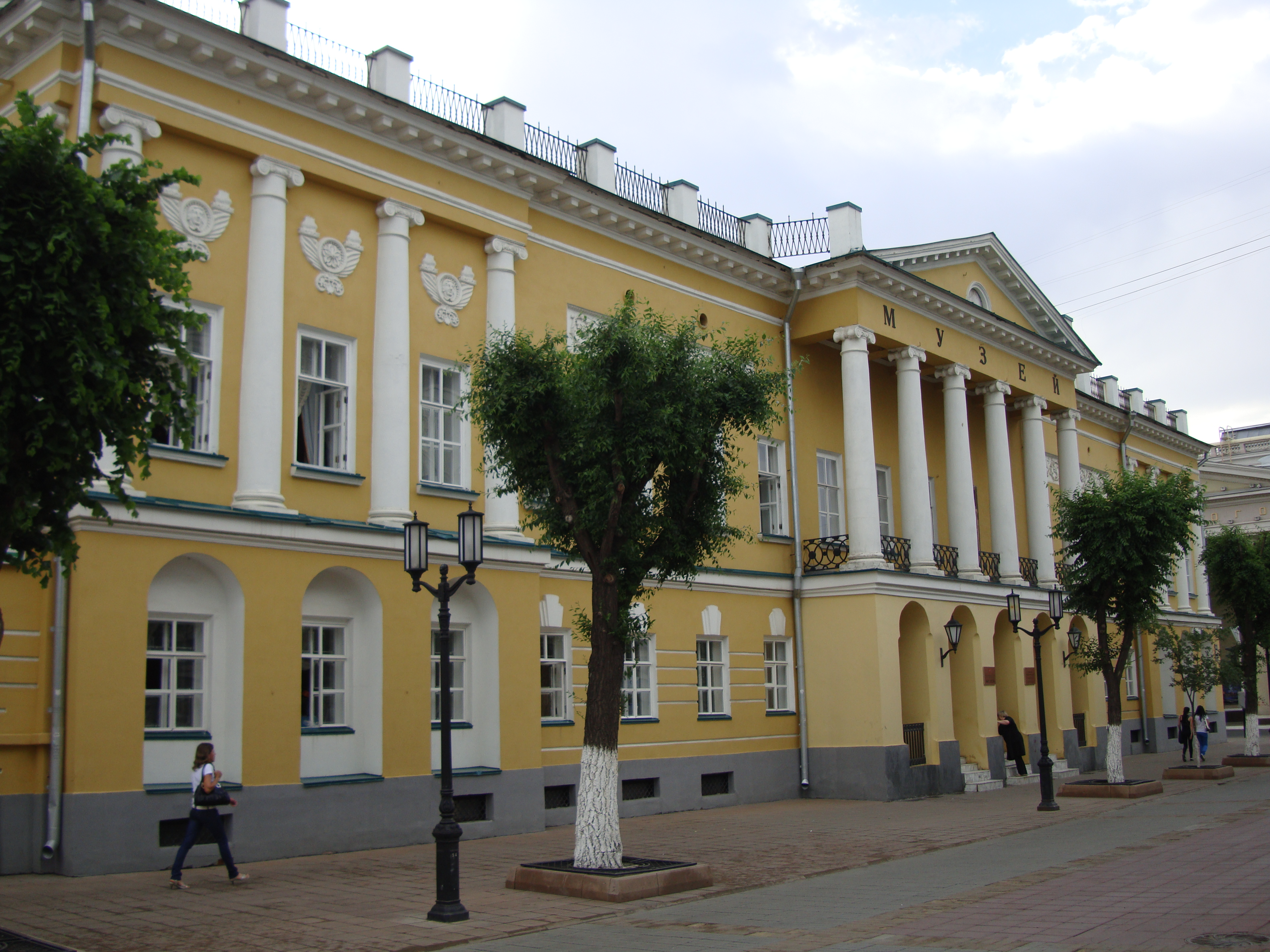
Former Kazakh Workers' and Peasants' Inspection

=== Later history ===
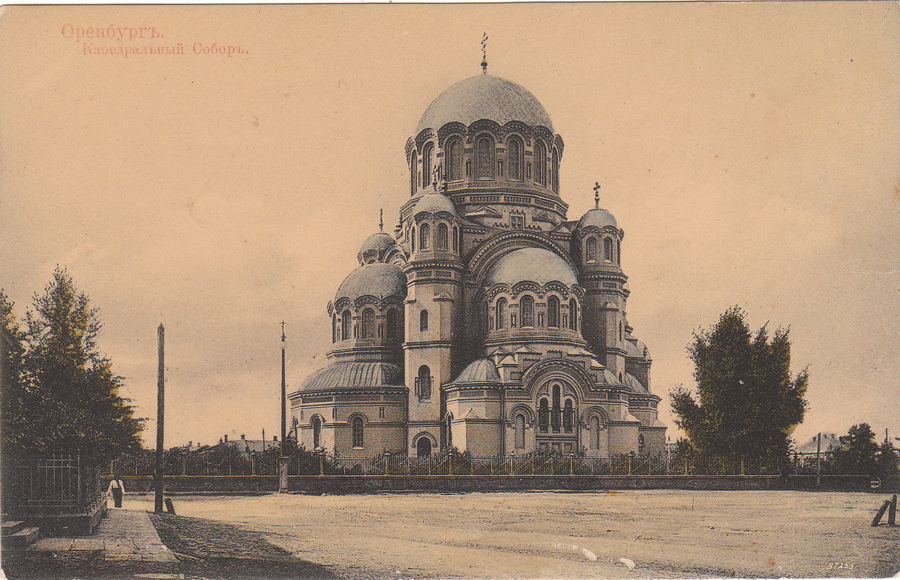
Our Lady of Kazan Cathedral was destroyed in the 1930s

From 1938 to 1957, the city bore the name Chkalov (Чка́лов) (after the prominent test pilot Valery Chkalov). The city's distance from the German invasion during World War II led many Soviet enterprises to flee there, helping to spur the city's economic growth. In connection with the formation of the Polish Anders' Army, a Polish diplomatic post was established in the city in November 1941, however it was closed in July 1942 when the Soviets arrested six of its staff members (who were released in October 1942).

As part of Soviet anti-religious legislation, churches and mosques were closed down. One mosque was reopened in 1945.

After the Fall of Communism, four mosques were restored to Muslims in 1993–1996.

== Administrative and municipal status ==
Orenburg is the administrative center of the oblast and, within the framework of administrative divisions, it also serves as the administrative centre of Orenburgsky District, even though it is not a part of it. As an administrative division, it is, together with ten rural localities, incorporated separately as the City of Orenburg—an administrative unit with the status equal to that of the districts. As a municipal division, the City of Orenburg is incorporated as Orenburg Urban Okrug.

== Geography ==
The city is in the basin of the middle branch of the River Ural, near its confluence with the River Sakmara. The highest point of the city is 154.4 meters (507 ft).

The Ural River forms the boundary between Europe and Asia in Orenburg.

=== Climate ===
Orenburg is located in the border of cold semi-arid climate (Köppen climate classification BSk) and hot-summer humid continental climate (Köppen climate classification Dfa) zones with quite long and hot summers and long and very cold winters.

Climate data for Orenburg (1991–2020, extremes 1832–present)
Month	Jan	Feb	Mar	Apr	May	Jun	Jul	Aug	Sep	Oct	Nov	Dec	Year
Record high °C (°F)	4.7 (40.5)	5.8 (42.4)	21.3 (70.3)	31.3 (88.3)	36.5 (97.7)	40.5 (104.9)	41.6 (106.9)	40.9 (105.6)	38.0 (100.4)	27.0 (80.6)	19.2 (66.6)	8.1 (46.6)	41.6 (106.9)
Mean daily maximum °C (°F)	−8.1 (17.4)	−7 (19)	−0.2 (31.6)	13.6 (56.5)	22.7 (72.9)	27.4 (81.3)	29.3 (84.7)	28.1 (82.6)	21.0 (69.8)	11.8 (53.2)	0.8 (33.4)	−6.1 (21.0)	11.1 (52.0)
Daily mean °C (°F)	−11.8 (10.8)	−11.3 (11.7)	−4.4 (24.1)	7.2 (45.0)	15.9 (60.6)	20.6 (69.1)	22.5 (72.5)	20.9 (69.6)	14.2 (57.6)	6.4 (43.5)	−2.7 (27.1)	−9.6 (14.7)	5.7 (42.3)
Mean daily minimum °C (°F)	−15.4 (4.3)	−15.4 (4.3)	−8.4 (16.9)	2.1 (35.8)	9.0 (48.2)	13.7 (56.7)	15.6 (60.1)	13.9 (57.0)	8.0 (46.4)	1.9 (35.4)	−5.7 (21.7)	−13.1 (8.4)	0.5 (32.9)
Record low °C (°F)	−43.2 (−45.8)	−40.1 (−40.2)	−36.8 (−34.2)	−26 (−15)	−5.7 (21.7)	−0.7 (30.7)	4.9 (40.8)	−1 (30)	−5.3 (22.5)	−19.8 (−3.6)	−35.7 (−32.3)	−39.2 (−38.6)	−43.2 (−45.8)
Average precipitation mm (inches)	29 (1.1)	24 (0.9)	26 (1.0)	27 (1.1)	31 (1.2)	34 (1.3)	42 (1.7)	22 (0.9)	26 (1.0)	33 (1.3)	29 (1.1)	31 (1.2)	354 (13.9)
Average extreme snow depth cm (inches)	17 (6.7)	23 (9.1)	19 (7.5)	2 (0.8)	0 (0)	0 (0)	0 (0)	0 (0)	0 (0)	0 (0)	3 (1.2)	9 (3.5)	23 (9.1)
Average rainy days	4	3	6	11	15	15	14	13	13	14	11	6	125
Average snowy days	23	20	13	4	0.2	0	0	0	0.3	4	15	21	101
Average relative humidity (%)	80	79	79	62	53	54	55	54	59	68	80	81	67
Mean monthly sunshine hours	75.7	111.7	171.1	234.8	312.4	338.0	350.2	301.7	225.5	139.8	73.3	62.5	2,396.7
Source 1: Pogoda.ru.net
Source 2: NOAA

== Demographics ==
Historical population

Year	Pop.	±%
1861	24,078	—
1897	72,000	+199.0%
1926	122,190	+69.7%
1939	171,726	+40.5%
1959	267,317	+55.7%
1970	344,266	+28.8%

Year	Pop.	±%
1979	458,747	+33.3%
1989	546,501	+19.1%
2002	549,361	+0.5%
2010	548,331	−0.2%
2021	543,654	−0.9%

Source: and Census data

== Economy ==
Orenburg is home to several large companies or their subsidiaries.

=== Oil and gas ===
Orenburggazprom operates the Orenburg gas processing plant, a subsidiary of Gazprom.

Orenburgneft, a subsidiary of TNK-BP oil company Orenburgenergy,one of the biggest energy generating companies in Russia.

=== Transport ===
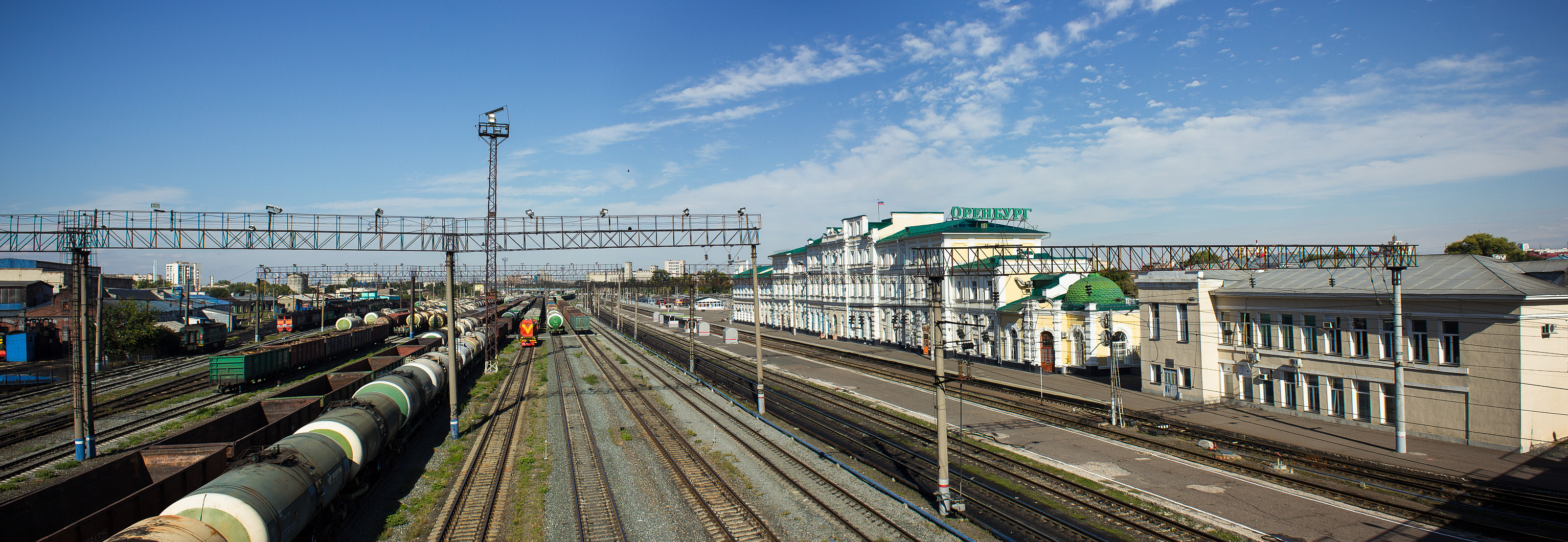
Main railway station

Orenburg has been a major railway centre ever since the Samara-Zlatoust and Orenburg-Tashkent lines were completed, respectively in 1876 and 1905. Orenburg's main airport is the Orenburg Tsentralny Airport, located about 25 kilometers (16 mi) east of the city, on the Orsk destination, and used to be the headquarters of now defunct Orenair. City public transport includes bus, trolleybus and also marshrutkas (fixed-route share-taxis).

== Education and culture ==
Orenburg is a regional centre of education and has a number of cultural institutions and museums.

=== Education ===
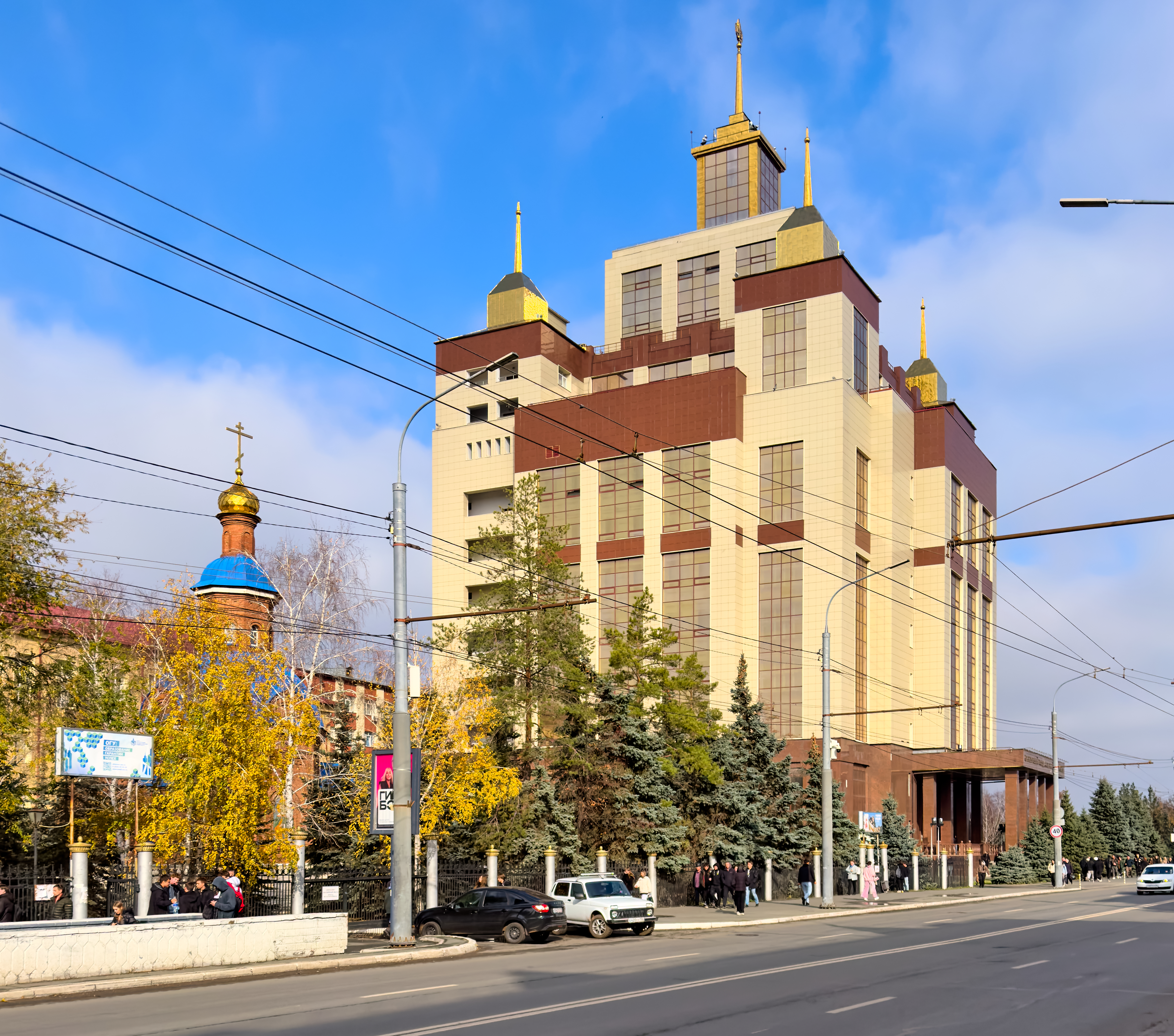
Orenburg State University

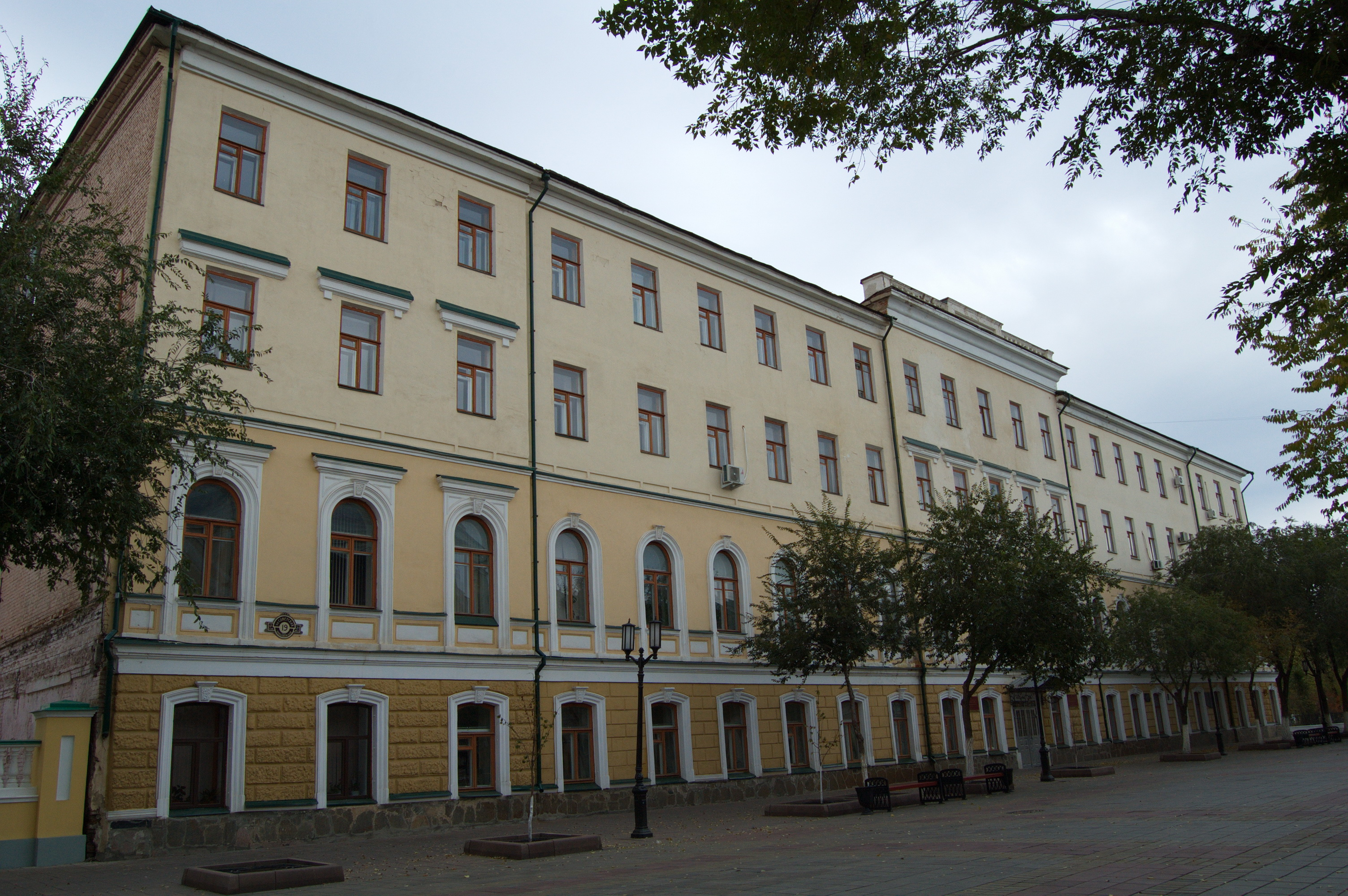
Orenburg State Pedagogical University

- Orenburg State University. The university was founded in 1955 as a branch of Kuibyshev Polytechnic Institute. In 1971 it converted into Orenburg Polytechnic Institute. In 1994 it became Orenburg State Technical University. In 1996, converted into Orenburg State University. In 2014 Orenburg State Institute of Management integrated with Orenburg State University.
- Orenburg State Medical University. Established in 1944 as Chkalov State Medical Institute. It was renamed to Orenburg State Medical Institute in 1957 (at that time Orenburg city regained its original name after being named Chkalov from 1937 till 1957). It gained the status of academy in 1994. Currently there are eight faculties: Medicine, Pediatric, Stomatology (Dentistry), Pharmacy, Clinical Psychology, Nursing, Public Health (Медико-профилактический), and Continuing Education.
- Orenburg State Agrarian University. Established in 1930 as Orenburg Agricultural Institute. It was transformed to Orenburg State Agricultural Academy in 1992. Since 1995 named as Orenburg State Agrarian University. There are 8 faculties and four institutes.
- Orenburg State Pedagogical University. Established in 1919 as Institute of Public Education. Renamed to Pedagogical Institute in 1930. Transformed to Pedagogical University in 1996. There are 10 faculties and four research institutes.
- Orenburg Branch of Kutafin Moscow State Law University
- Orenburg Branch of Gubkin Russian State University of Oil and Gas
- Orenburg Physics and Mathematics Lyceum. Prestigious school, permanently ranked in the top Russian schools rating (generally and in STEM sub-rating).

=== Museums ===
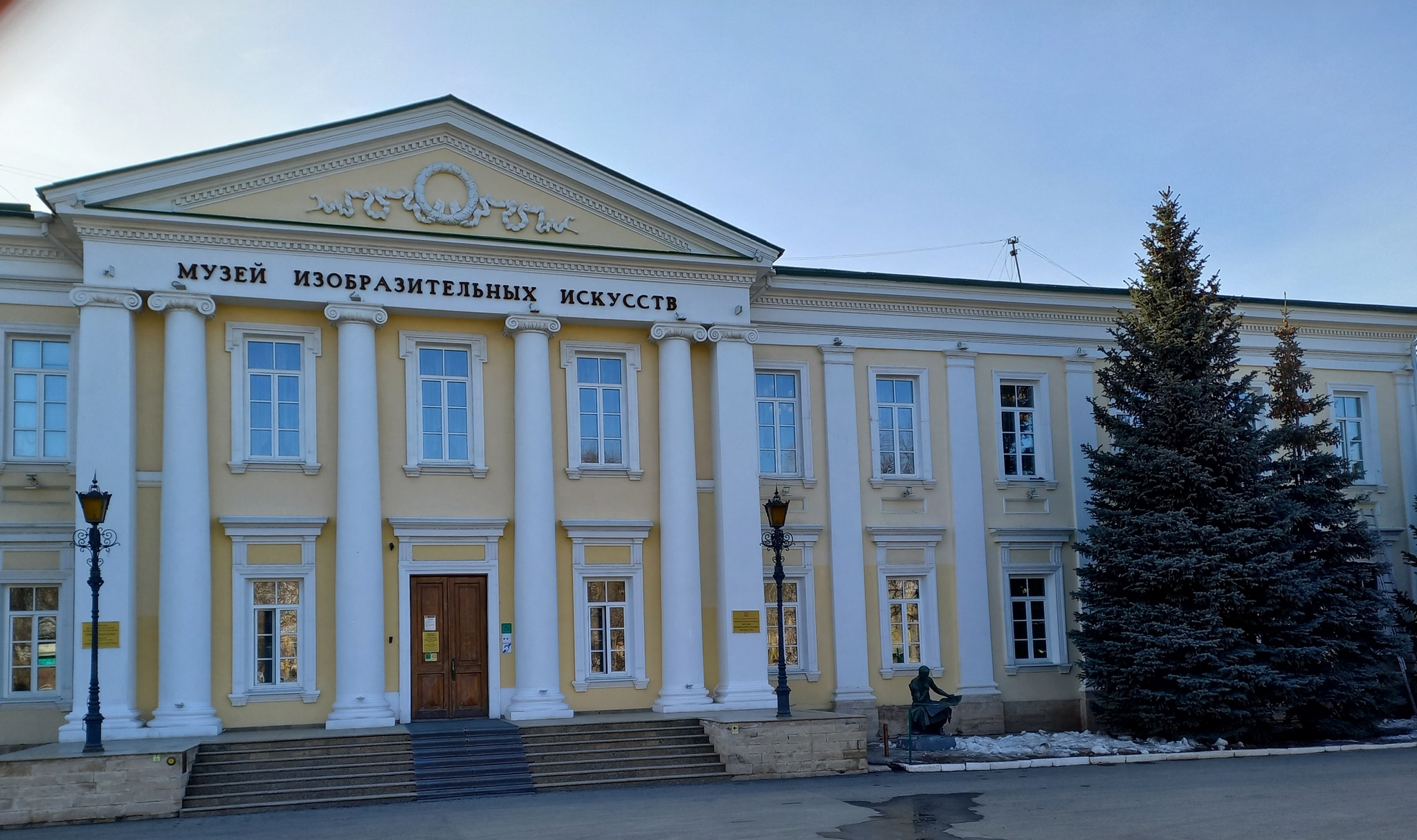
Orenburg Regional Museum of Fine Arts

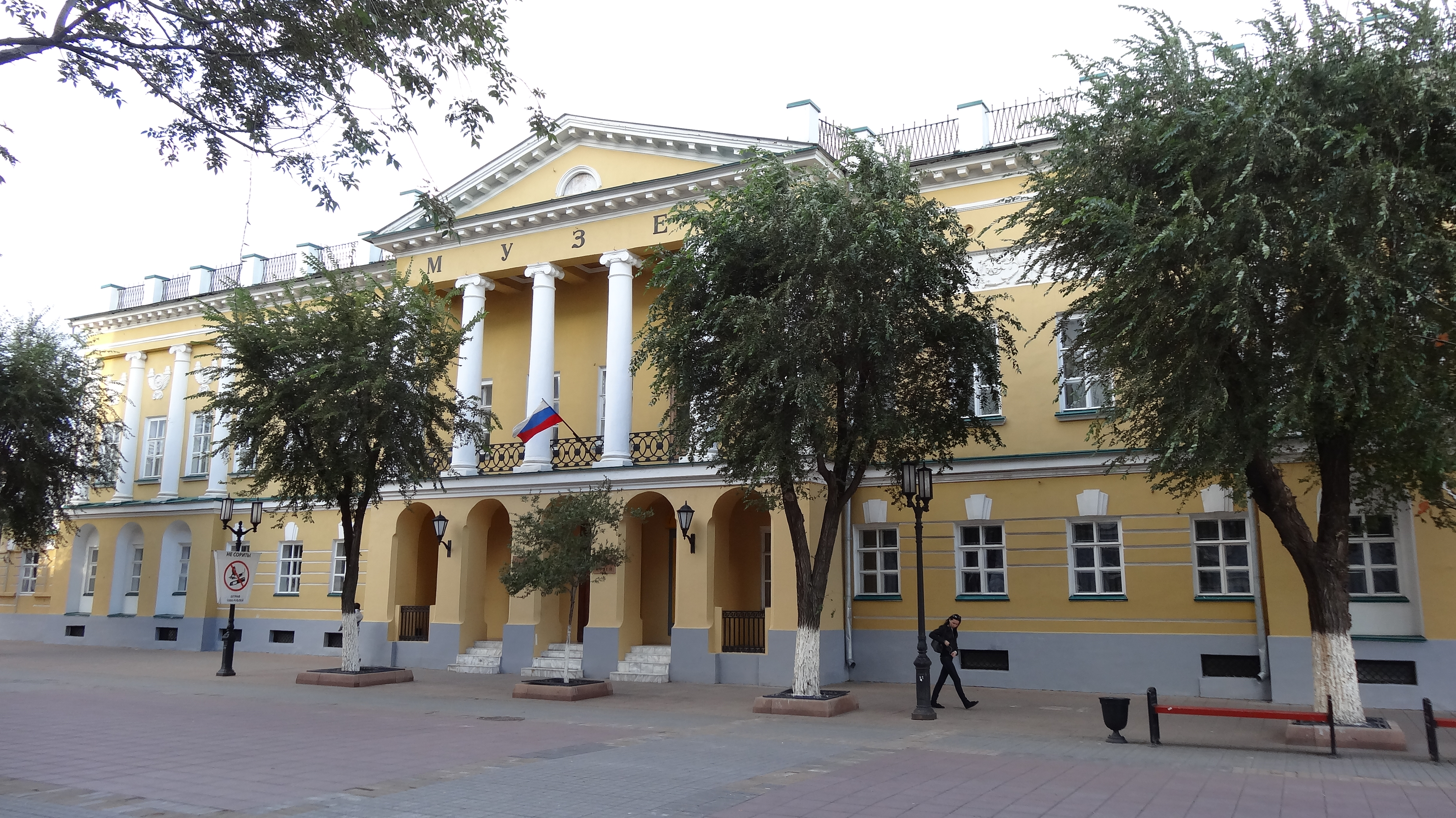
Orenburg Governor's Museum of History and Local Lore

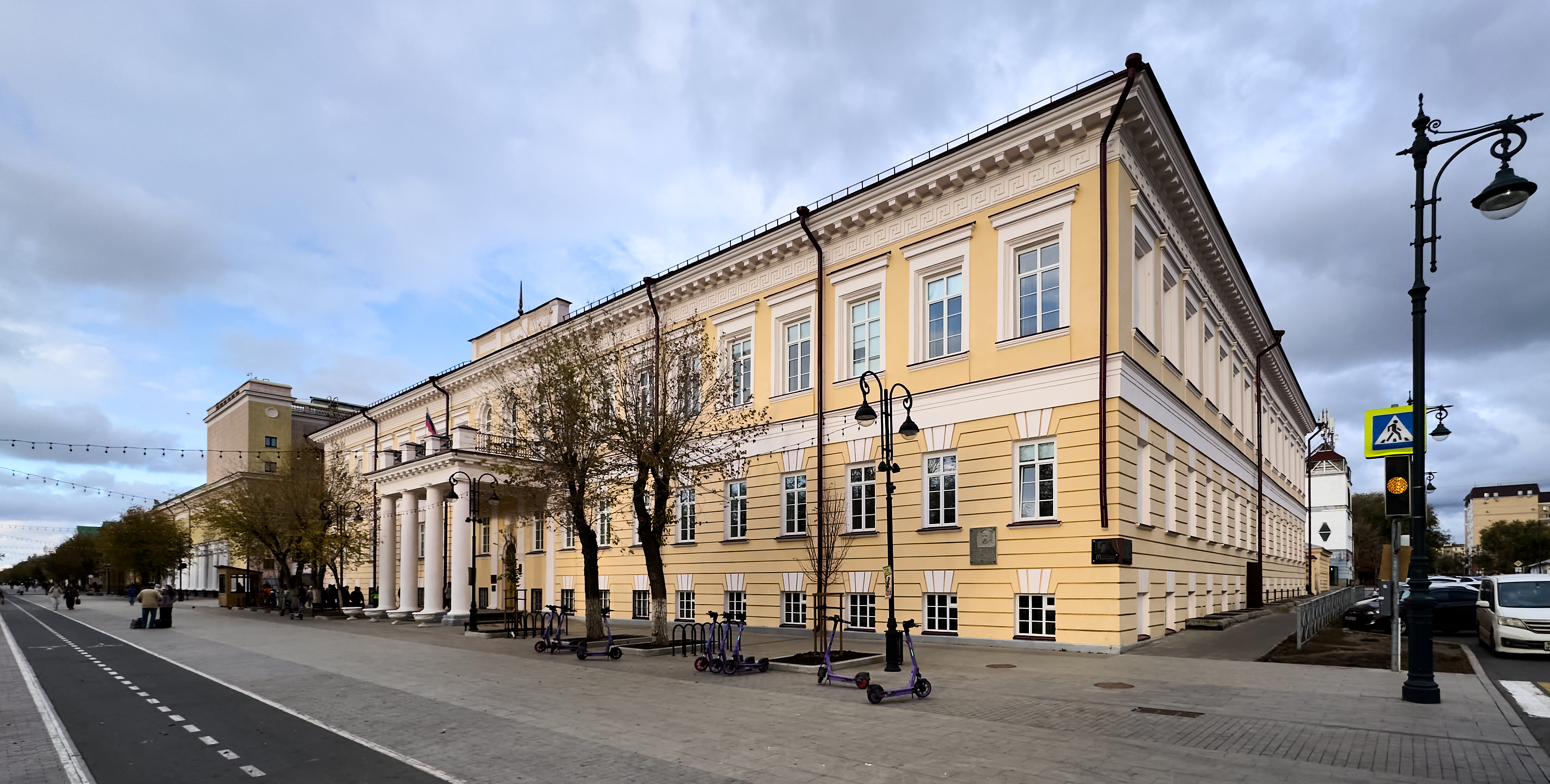
Taras Shevchenko Memorial Museum

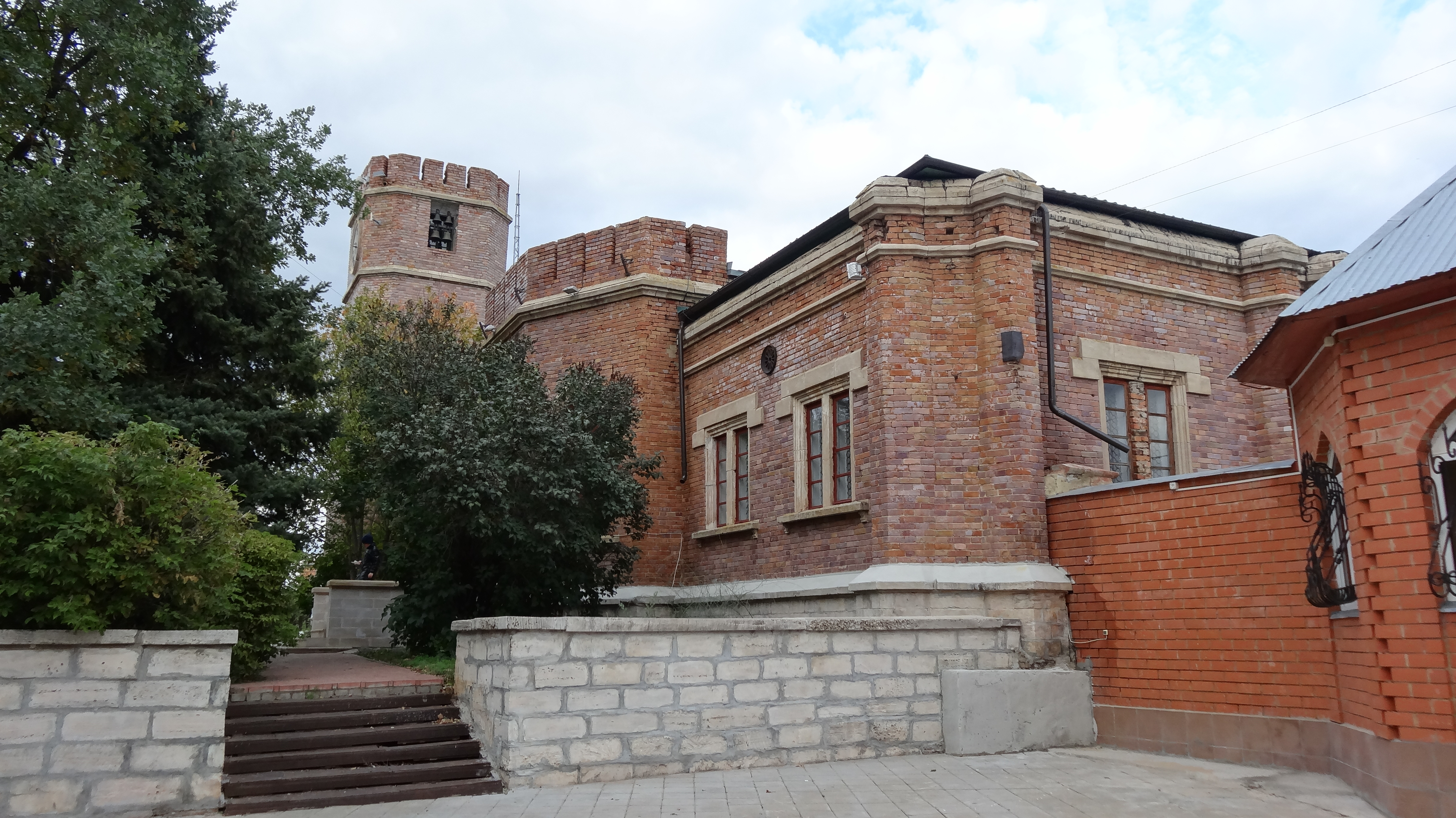
Museum of Orenburg History

- Orenburg Regional Museum of History and Natural Science
- Orenburg Regional Museum of Fine Arts
- Museum of Orenburg History
- Memorial Apartment of Yuri and Valentina Gagarin
- Memorial Apartment of Leopold and Mstislav Rostropovich
- Memorial Apartment of T.G. Shevchenko
- Orenburg City Memorial House

=== Theatres ===
- Orenburg Maxim Gorky State Drama Theater
- Orenburg State Regional Music Theater
- Orenburg State Tatar Drama Theater
- Orenburg State Regional Puppet Theater
- Orenburg Municipal Puppet Theater "Pierrot"
- Orenburg Municipal Chamber Choir
- Orenburg State Academic Russian Folk Choir

== Tourism ==
Mountain and river tourism are developed in the region. There are a number of fast mountain rivers and rocks in pleated spurs of the southern edge of the Urals range, popular with tourists. The city is known for its location between Europe and Asia. The Ural River marks the border of Asia and Europe, and there is a bridge which connects the two sides.

The city is famous for its down Orenburg shawls. The thinnest lacy design, knitted by hand shawls and cobweb-like kerchiefs (pautinkas), is not only warm, but also is used for decorative purposes.

== Architecture ==
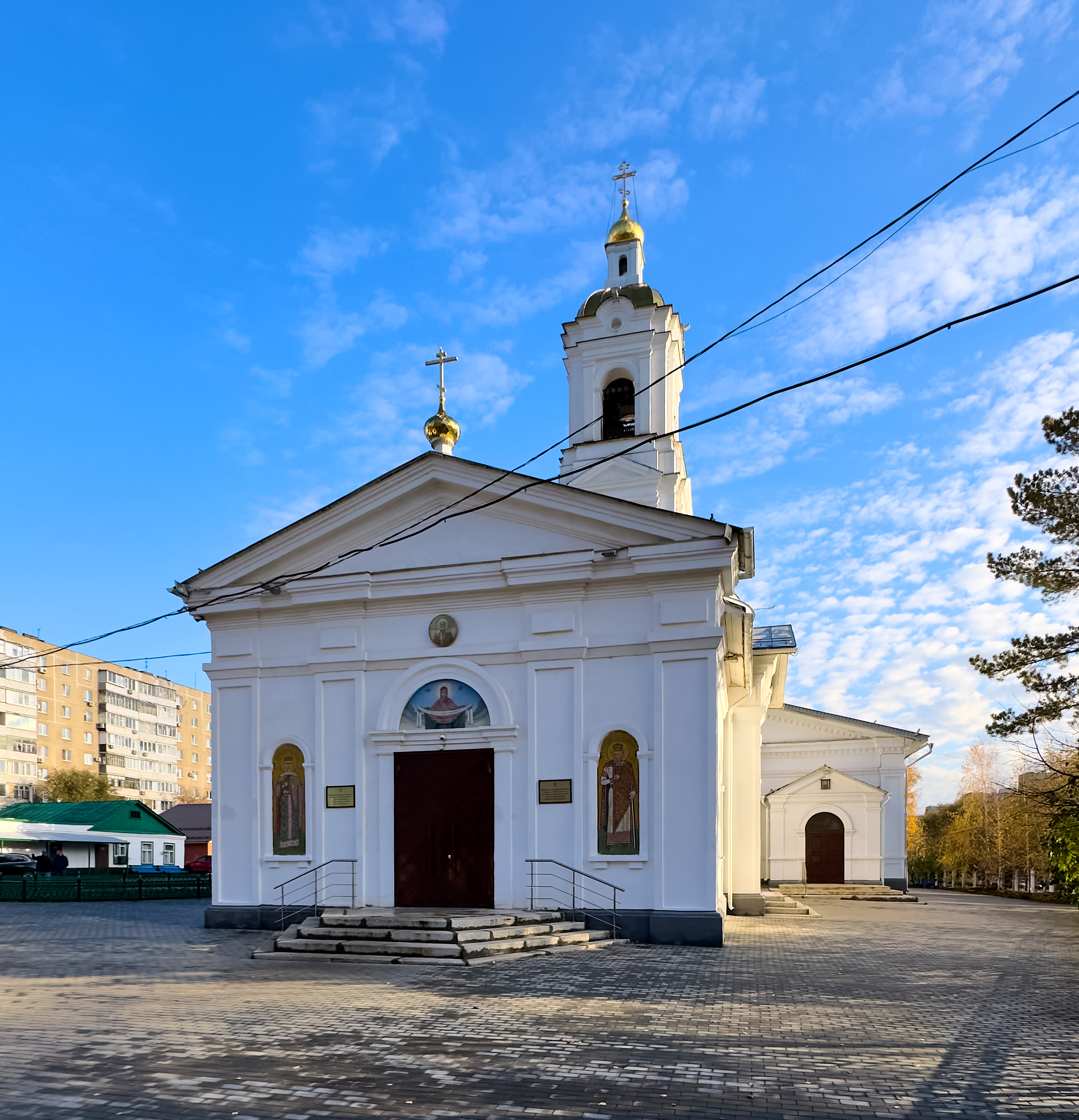
Saint Nicholas cathedral

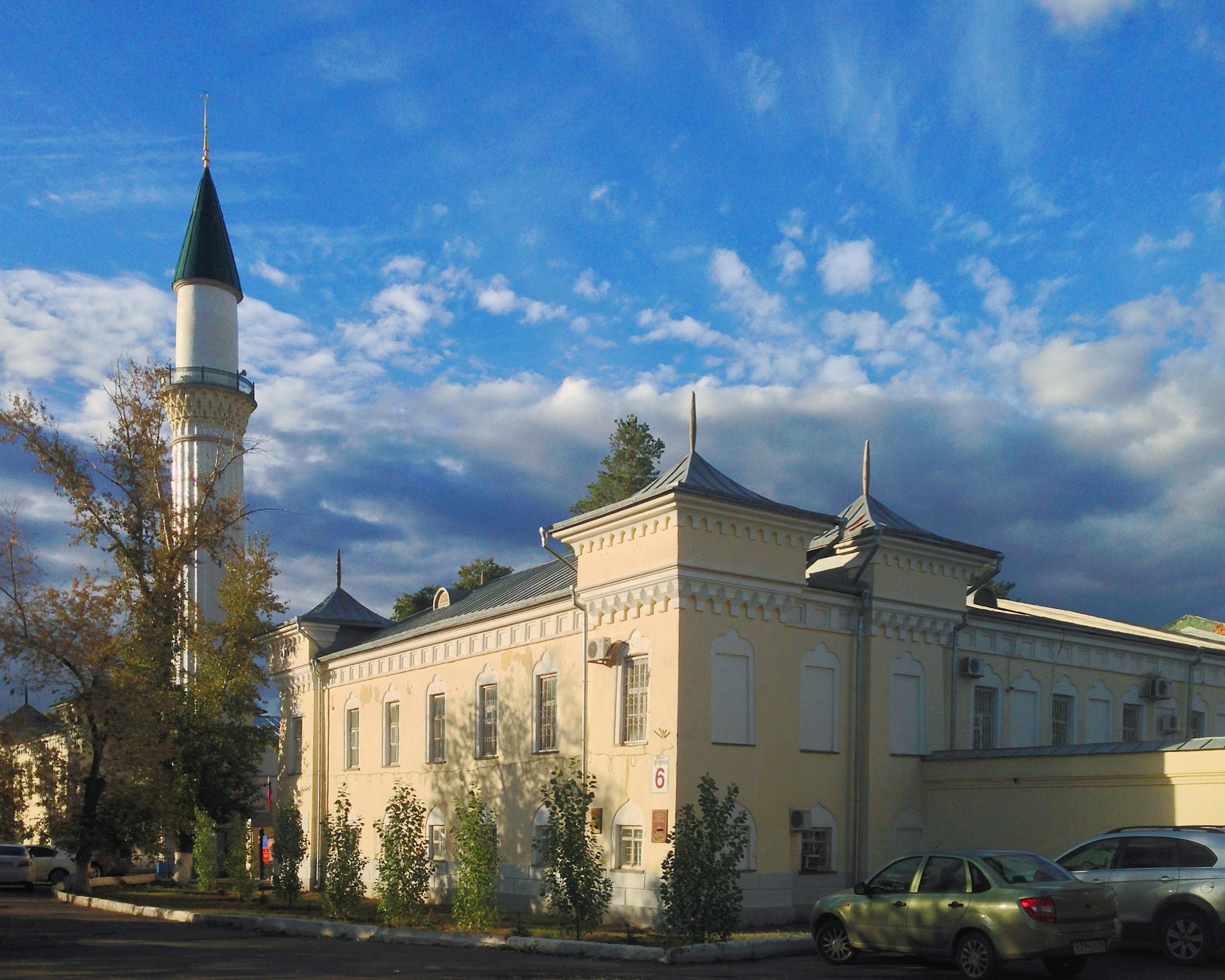
Orenburg Caravanserai

A famous boulevard on the embankment of the Ural River is one of the most notable places in Orenburg. Orenburg TV Tower is a guyed mast of unusual design. It is a 200-meter (660 ft) tall mast equipped with six crossbars running from the mast structure to the guys.

Orenburg is home to important sites related to the history of Kazakhstan, including the building that hosted the Second All-Kazakh Congress in 1917, at which the Alash Autonomy, the first 20th-century Kazakh state, was proclaimed, the former Public Assembly building, which hosted the first ever Constituent Congress of the Soviets of the Kazakh ASSR in 1920, at which the Kazakh Autonomous Socialist Soviet Republic was established, other government buildings from the time when the city served as the Kazakh capital, and former home of writer, publisher and educator Ahmet Baitursynuly.

There are also several sites associated with the most prominent Ukrainian poet of the 19th century, Taras Shevchenko, including the places where he lived, marked by commemorative plaques, and a museum dedicated to him at one of these sites.

There is a number of historic religious buildings in the city, including Russian Orthodox churches, several mosques associated with the local Kazakh, Bashkir (Orenburg Caravanserai) and Tatar communities, a Polish-built Catholic church, and a Jewish synagogue.

The Embassy of the Emirate of Bukhara in Orenburg is a registered historic monument with the Ministry of Culture of the Russian Federation.

== Sports ==
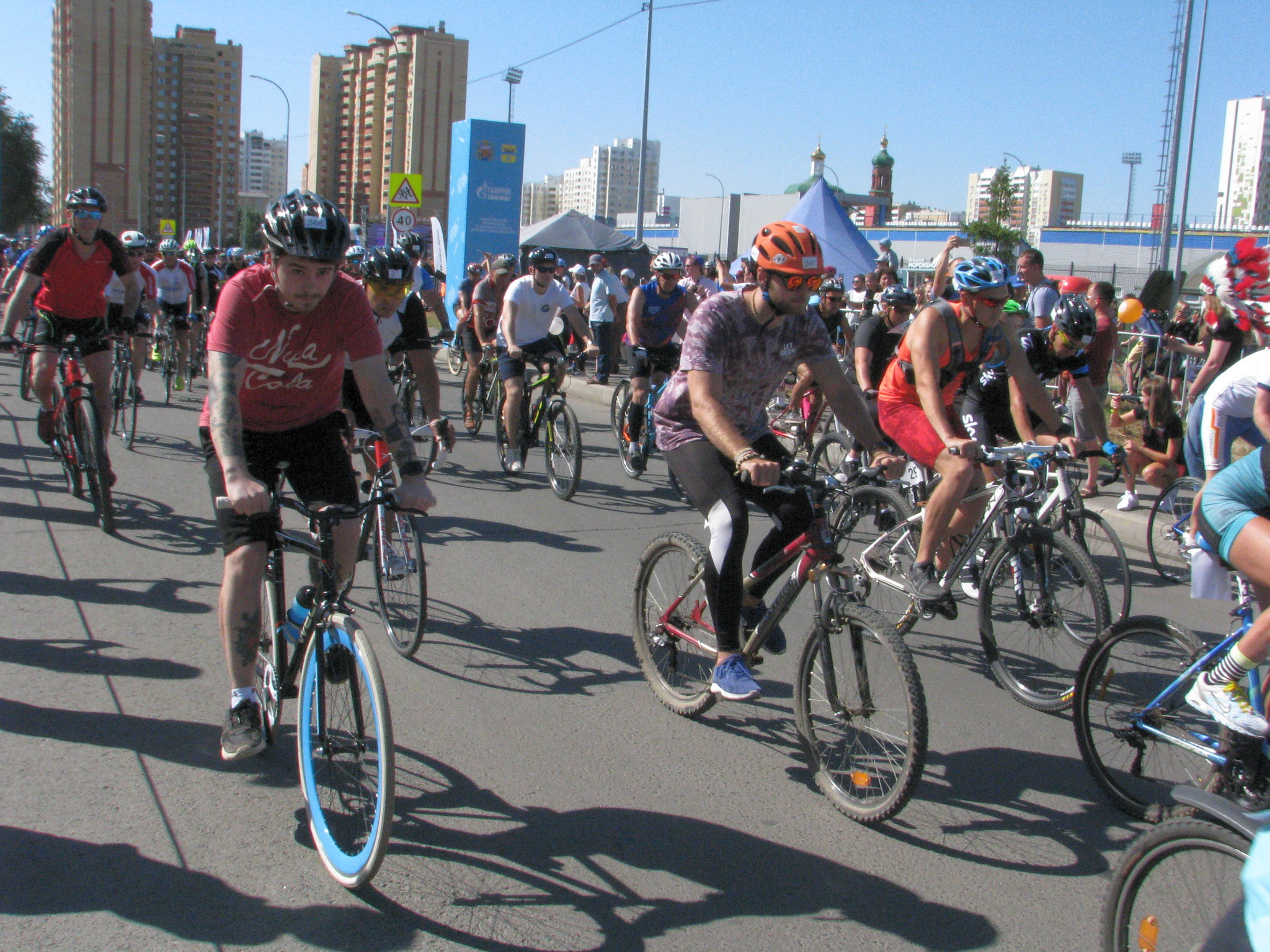
Cycling event in Orenburg

- FC Orenburg, the local football team founded in 1970, reached the Russian Premier League for the first time during the 2016-17 season.
- Lokomotiv has played in the highest division of the Russian Bandy League. Now they play in the second highest division, Russian Bandy Supreme League. Their home arena has a capacity of 5000.
- Nadezhda Orenburg is a women's basketball club competing in the Russian Women's Basketball Premier League and playing in the Orenburzhe Sports Hall.
- Fakel Gazproma is a table tennis club with, among other players, the three time European champion Uładzimir Samsonaŭ.

=== National events ===
In October 2015, the Russian Rink Bandy Cup was to be organised.

== Honors ==
The asteroid 27709 Orenburg was named after the city on 1 June 2007.†

== Notable people ==
- Ivan Krylov (1769–1844), writer
- Vasily Alekseevich Perovsky (1794–1857), statesman
- Vladimir Dal (1801–1872), lexicographer
- Taras Shevchenko (1814–1861), Ukrainian poet
- Ybyrai Altynsarin (1841–1889), Kazakh educator, graduate of the Kazakh school in Orenburg
- Yevgraf Fyodorov (1853–1919), mathematician, crystallographer, and mineralogist

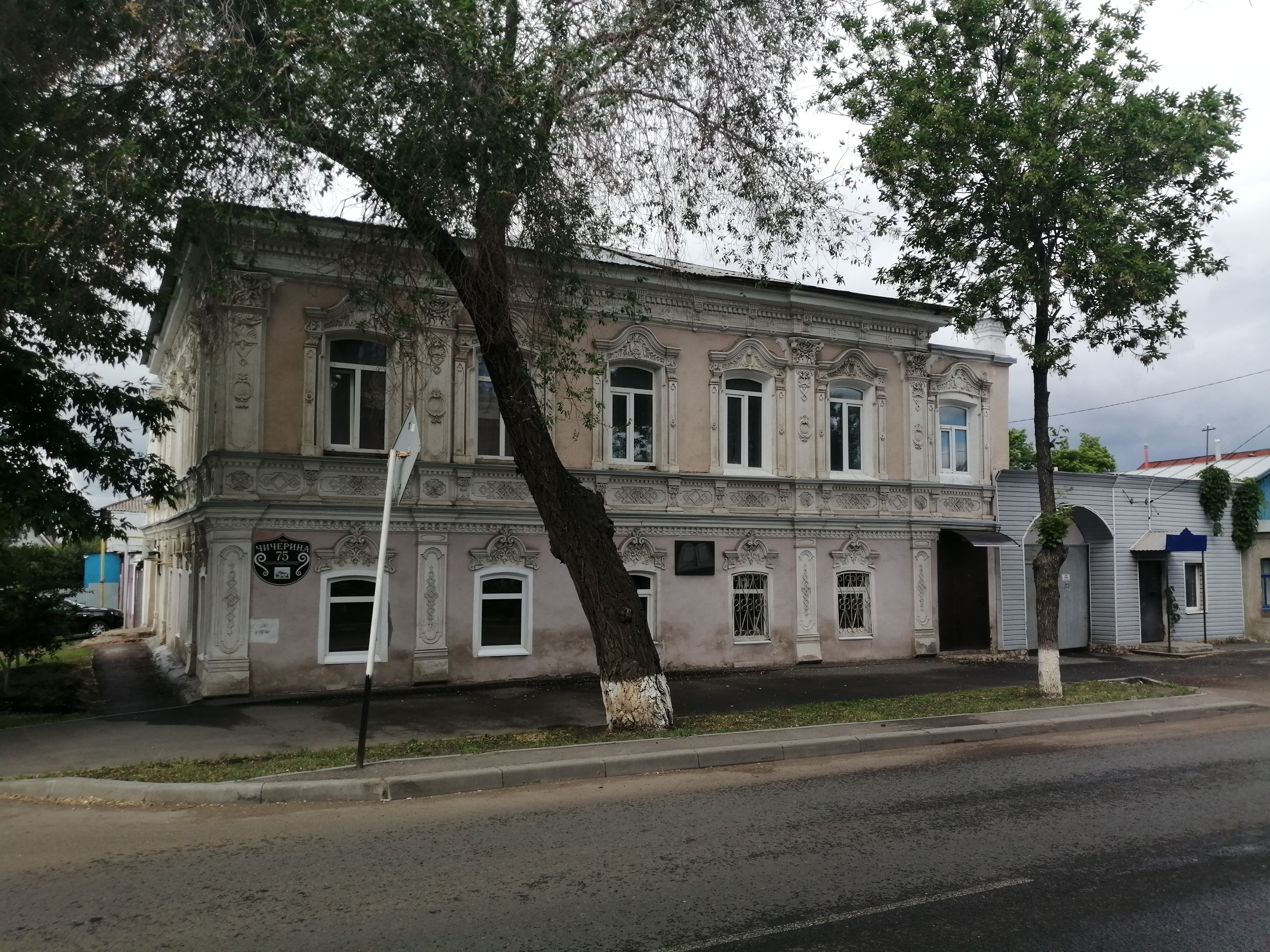
Former home of Ahmet Baitursynuly

- Ahmet Baitursynuly (1872–1937), Kazakh writer, publisher, educator and deputy
- Mirjaqip Dulatuli (1885–1935), Kazakh poet and educator
- Paul Nazaroff (1890–1942), geologist and writer
- Joseph Kessel (1898–1979), journalist and novelist
- Georgy Malenkov (1902–1988), General Secretary of the Communist Party of the Soviet Union (de facto,1952-1953) and fifth Premier of the Soviet Union
- Musa Cälil (1906–1944), poet
- Alexander Schmorell (1917–1943), a member of the anti-Nazi group White Rose
- Aleksander Burba (1918–1984), industry leader and educator
- Mstislav Rostropovich (1927–2007), cellist
- Yuri Gagarin (1934–1968), cosmonaut
- Lev Alburt (born 1945) chess grandmaster
- Denis Istomin (born 1986), tennis player
- Alexander Alexandrovich Prokhorenko (1990–2016), a Senior lieutenant with the Special Operations Forces of the Russian Armed Forces. He was killed during the Palmyra offensive of the Syrian Civil War. Prokhorenko was identifying targets for Russian airstrikes when he was surrounded by ISIS fighters near Palmyra and ordered an airstrike on his own location

== Twin towns – sister cities ==
Orenburg is twinned with:

- Aktobe, Kazakhstan
- Khujand, Tajikistan
- Oral, Kazakhstan
- Orlando, United States (temporarily suspended)
