= George Burba =

American bio-atmospheric scientist

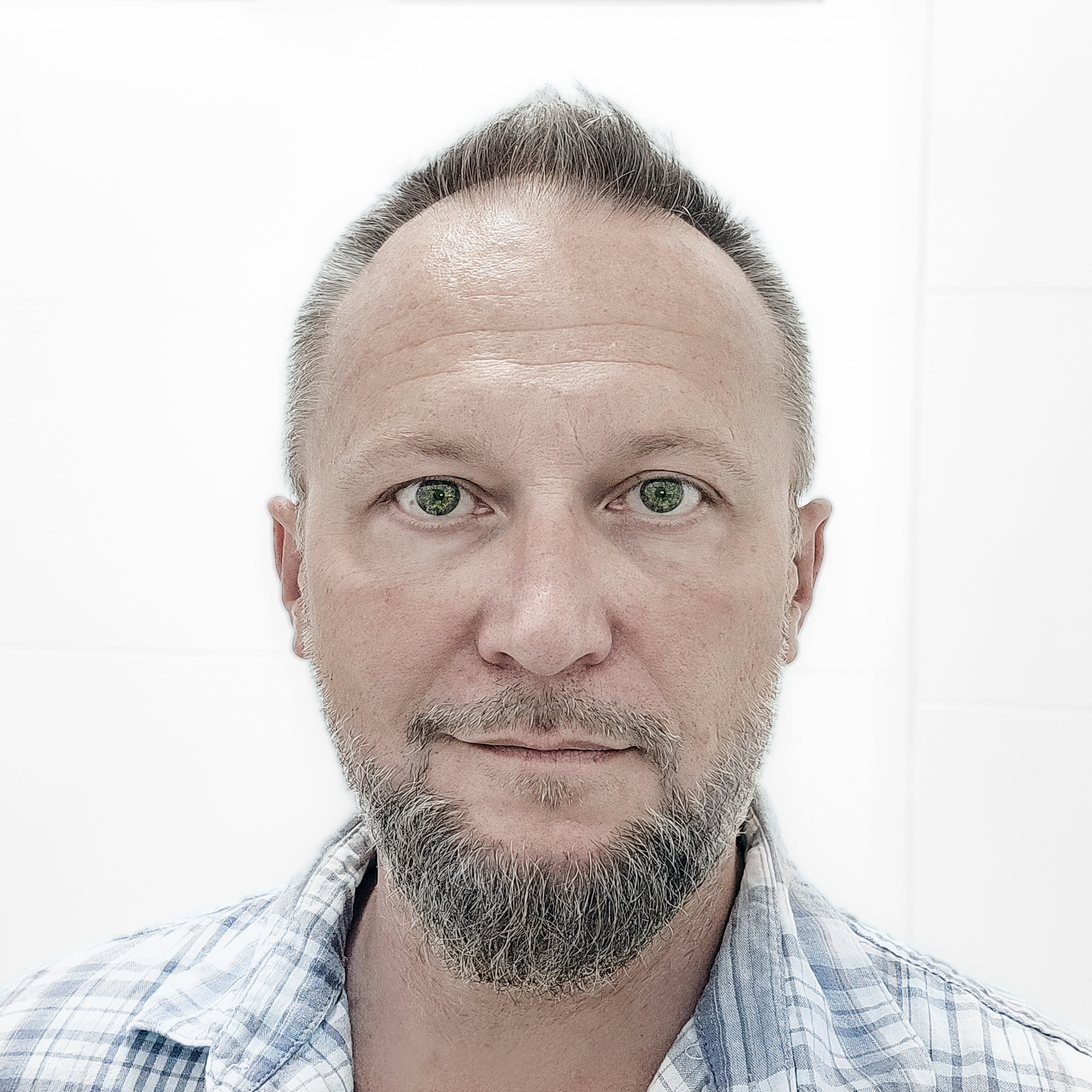
- Born: George G. Burba
- Education: University of Nebraska–Lincoln; Moscow State University
- Scientific career
- Fields: Atmospheric Sciences; Micrometeorology; Climate Change; Ecosystems; Carbon Sequestration; Evapotranspiration
- Workplaces: LI-COR Biosciences; Battery Ventures; Robert B. Daugherty Water for Food Global Institute; University of Nebraska–Lincoln; Moscow State University
- Doctoral advisor: Shashi Verma
- Website: gburba.com/science/

George Burba is an American bio-atmospheric scientist, author, and inventor.

Burba is a Science & Strategy Fellow at LI-COR Biosciences of the Battery Ventures Group, a Global Fellow at Robert B. Daugherty Water for Food Global Institute, and a Graduate Adjunct Professor at the University of Nebraska–Lincoln. He is a co-founder of CarbonDew, a non-profit Community of Practice developing novel solutions across economic sectors.

Burba is a leading figure in micrometeorology, surface-to-atmosphere exchange of greenhouse gasses, water vapor, heat and momentum, and the direct real-time measurements of carbon emission and sequestration, evaporation and transpiration, and turbulent transport within the atmospheric boundary layer. He is an author of multiple books on these subjects, used by universities and teaching institutions across the globe, as well as numerous other publications.

== Research and career ==
Burba is an expert on the in-situ measurement methods: an author of instrument surface heating concept, related equations known as “Burba corrections”, an inventor of two new types of gas analyzers known as “enclosed-path” and “semi-open-path”, a multi-method flux emissions station, and new methods for computing gas fluxes from the open-path high-speed laser-based analyzers, and from the multiple types of low-speed gas analyzers. He is an elected Senior Member of the National Academy of Inventors.

After his PhD, Burba worked as a graduate faculty at the University of Nebraska–Lincoln and as a scientist at the LI-COR Biosciences. In 2016, he was appointed Global Fellow at Robert B. Daugherty Water for Food Global Institute. At LI-COR Biosciences, he was appointed to the position of Science Fellow in 2017, and to the position of Science & Strategy Fellow in 2019. The same year he was elected a Senior Member of the National Academy of Inventors.

In 2022, Burba co-founded CarbonDew, a non-profit international Community of Practice that unites environmental technology experts from over 250 organizations to jointly help enhance environmental quality, boost economic output, and optimize the use of natural resources, through direct atmospheric measurements of carbon, GHG, water, and heat exchange in and out of the air.

In 2023, he was inducted as a Full Member of SigmaXi, the Scientific Research Honor Society. In 2025, Burba was appointed by the National Academies of Sciences, Engineering, and Medicine to the Committee on the Assessment of the National Institute of Standards and Technology. In 2026, he was appointed by Nebraska Governor Jim Pillen to the NSF State Committee for the development of science and research infrastructure through the National Science Foundation and the National Institutes of Health.

Today, he is currently working on research projects, with a focus on better understanding interactions of the atmosphere, biosphere, and soil, as well as looking to improve and engineer new technologies, experimental systems, and techniques for research in the field.

== Education ==
Burba was educated at Lomonosov Moscow State University and at the University of Nebraska–Lincoln where he received a PhD in 2005 in Bio-Atmospheric Sciences for the study of GHG, water, light and energy transport in the natural and agricultural systems, supervised by Professor Shashi Verma.

== Personal life ==
George Burba is a son of ru:George A. Burba and a grandson of Aleksandr A. Burba.
