= Orenburg State University =

Public university in Orenburg, Russia

- Оренбургский государственный университет
- Former names: Orenburg Polytechnic Institute; Orenburg State Technical University
- Motto: Russian: Ученье разум просвещает
- Motto in English: Learning enlightens the mind
- Type: Public
- Established: 1955; 71 years ago
- Rector: Sergey Miroshnikov
- Administrative staff: 3,000
- Students: 43,000
- Undergraduates: 40,000
- Postgraduates: 3,000
- Location: Orenburg, Orenburg Oblast, Russia; 51.7780°N 55.1080°E
- Campus: urban
- Website: www.google.com

University rankings

Regional – Overall
- QS Emerging Europe and Central Asia: 401-450 (2022)

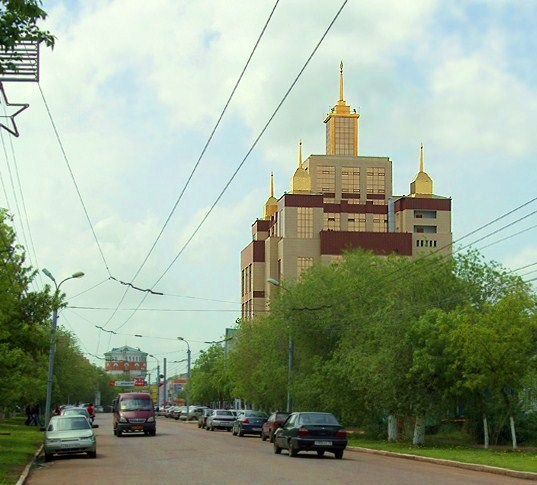
OSU Scientific Library at Prospekt Pobedy, 13

Orenburg State University (Russian: Оренбургский государственный университет, Orenburgskiy gosudárstvennyy universitét), previously known as Orenburg Polytechnic Institute (Russian: Оренбургский Политехнический Институт, Russian: ОГУ, OGU), is a university in Orenburg, Orenburg Oblast, Russia.

== History ==
The university was founded in 1955 as a branch of Kuibyshev Polytechnic Institute. In 1971, it converted into Orenburg Polytechnic Institute. In 1994, it became Orenburg State Technical University. In 1996, converted into Orenburg State University. In 2014, Orenburg State Institute of Management integrated with Orenburg State University.

== Staff and students ==
The university employs more than 1,200 academics and 1,800 support staff. More than 40,000 undergraduates and 3,000 advanced degree candidates are enrolled.

== Campus ==
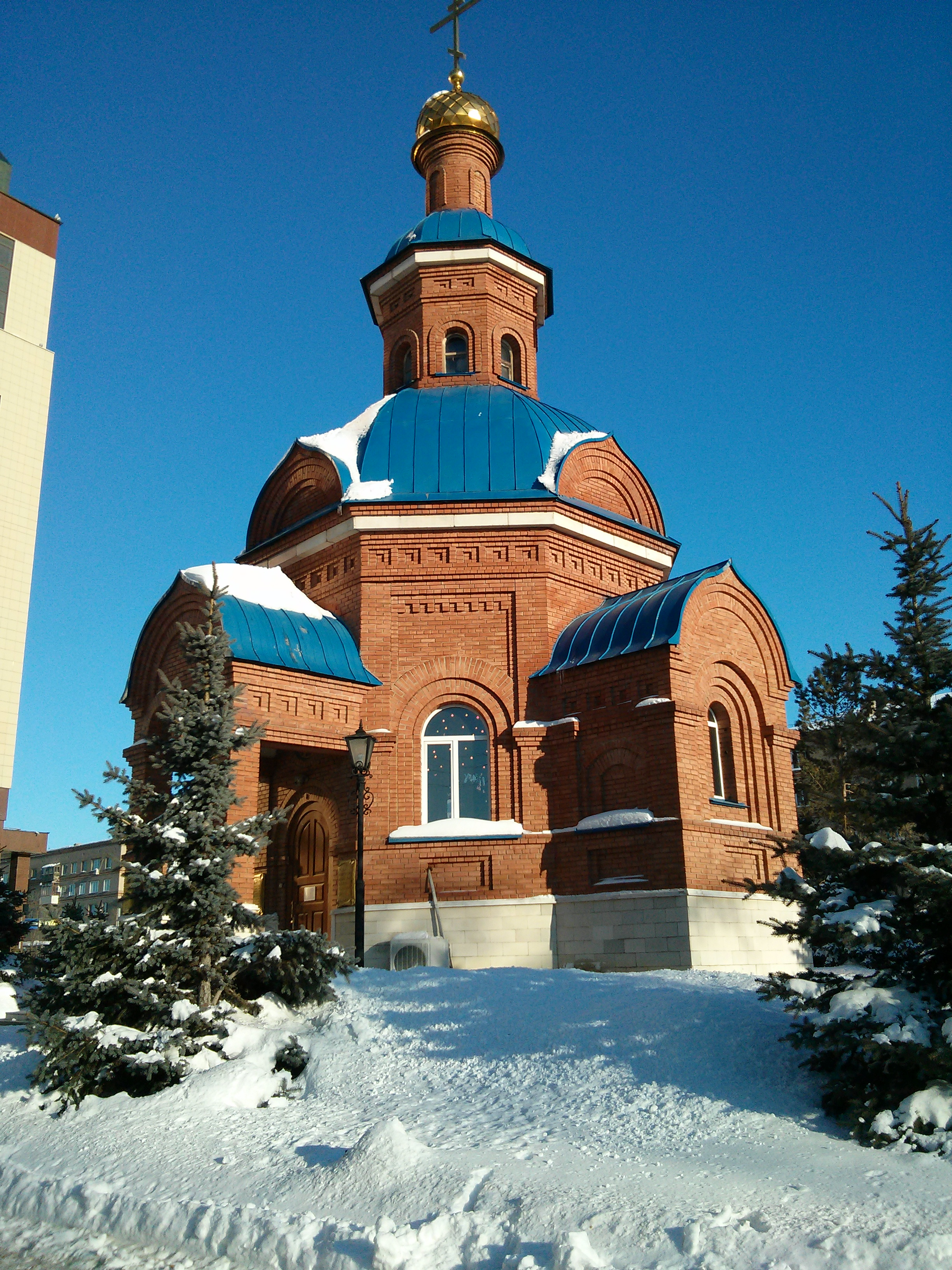
Church in front first camp of Orenburg State University

The university's main campus is composed of four education buildings, a dining hall, a health-improving and physical training gym with sport grounds, a library, students’ polyclinic and the Chapel of Saint Martyr Tatiana. The OSU campus also includes:

1. Dormitories
2. Medical Prophylactics Center
3. Students’ Center
4. The Palace of Culture "Russia"
5. The Palace of Youth Creativity "Progress"
6. OSU Museum
7. Geologic Museum

== Institutions and research centres ==
1. Institute of Bioelements is the satellite centre to Trace Element — Institute for UNESCO in Russia
2. Institute of Micro and Nanotechnology
3. Laboratory electronic media for educational purposes
4. Small Academy of Public Administration
5. Interdepartmental laboratory of geographic information technologies
6. Interdisciplinary Regional Centre of Training and Retraining
7. Meteorological Training Station
8. Research Institute of History and Ethnography of the Southern Urals
9. Research Institute of Regional Economy
10. Research Centre for monitoring of buildings and structures
11. Research and Education Center of Biochemical Physics of Nanosystems

== Rectors ==
1. Aleksander Burba (1971-1983)
2. Ramses Abdrashitov (1983-1987)
3. Anatoly Kozachenko (1987-1989)
4. Victor Bondarenko (1989-2006)
5. Vladimir Kovalevsky (2006-2015)
6. Zhanna Ermakova (2015-2020)
7. Sergey Miroshnikov (acting rector since 2020)

== Alumni ==
- Vladimir Elagin, governor of Orenburg Oblast (1991–1999)
- Nikolay Grigoryev, rector of The Moscow State Technological University
- Yuriy Berg, governor of Orenburg Oblast 2010-2019
- Denis Pasler, governor of Orenburg Oblast (since 2019)

== International cooperation ==
The university has many connections with foreign universities in Germany, Japan, Portugal, Finland and some other countries.

OSU has a Japanese Information Center, opened in 2006. The main goal of the Japanese Center is to develop economic, scientific, and cultural ties between Russia and Japan at the regional level, popularize all aspects of cooperation in the business environment, the university community, and the general public. Japanese language courses are organized on the basis of the Japanese Information Center.

In addition, the university has centers for English, Chinese, German, French and Slavic languages.

Students with a high enough academic performance gain the opportunity to participate in a student exchange program and study in Japan, Germany and Finland.
