= Embassy of the Emirate of Bukhara in Orenburg =

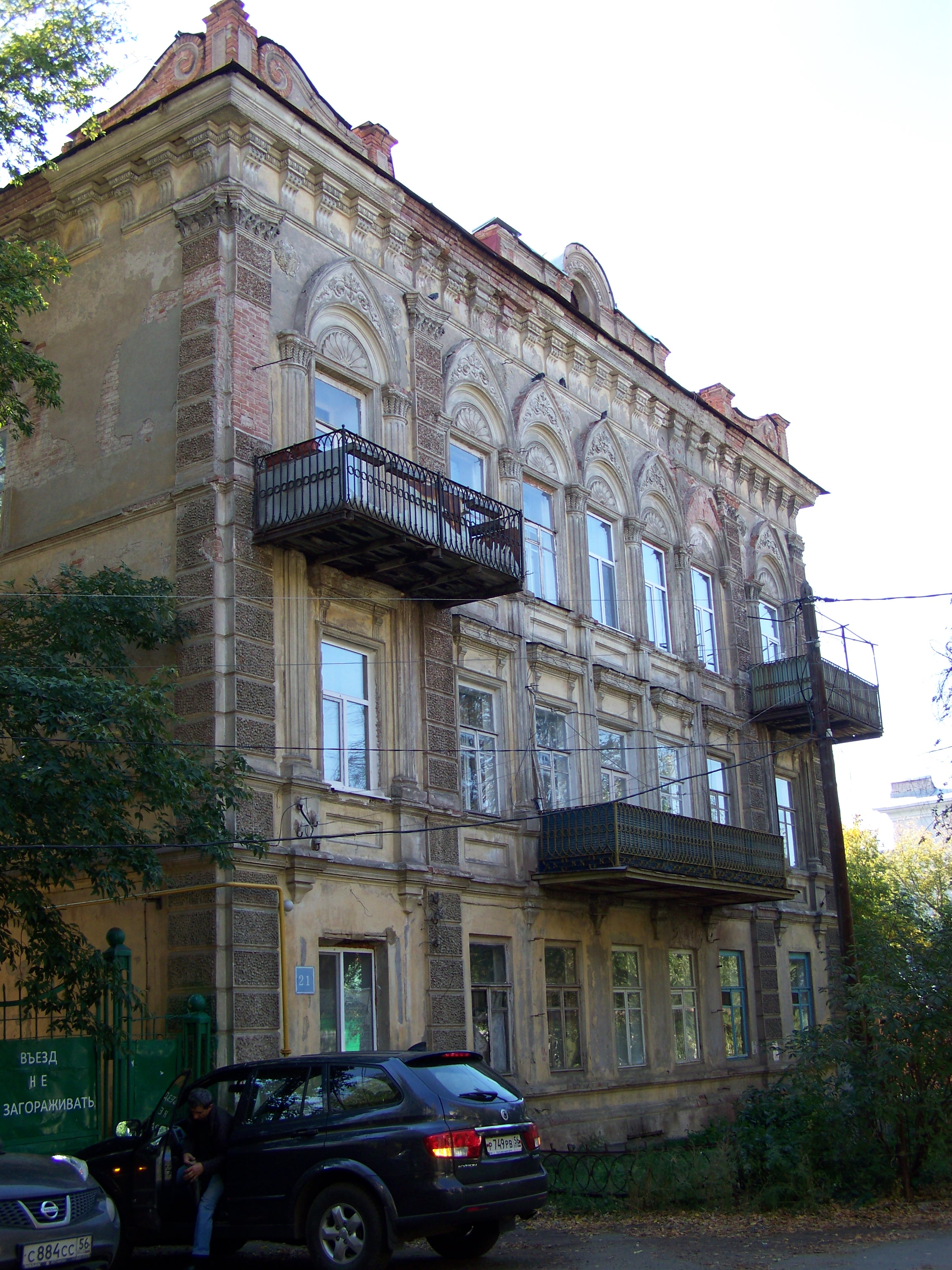
- 2012
- Interactive map of the Embassy of the Emirate of Bukhara in Orenburg area

General information
- Architectural style: Neoclassical with Islamic motif
- Location: 460000, Orenburg, Bukharsky Lane, 21
- Coordinates: 51.763851°N 55.096807°E
- Construction started: 19th century

Technical details
- Floor count: 3

The Embassy of the Emirate of Bukhara in Orenburg (Russian: Представительство Эмира Бухары) is a culturally significant building in Orenburg, Orenburg Oblast, Russia. It is a registered historic monument with the Ministry of Culture of the Russian Federation. The house was built for the Emir of Bukhara.

The house dates to the late 19th century and is designed in neoclassical style with decorative Islamic motif, particularly around the windows. It served as a court for the Orenburg Governorate.

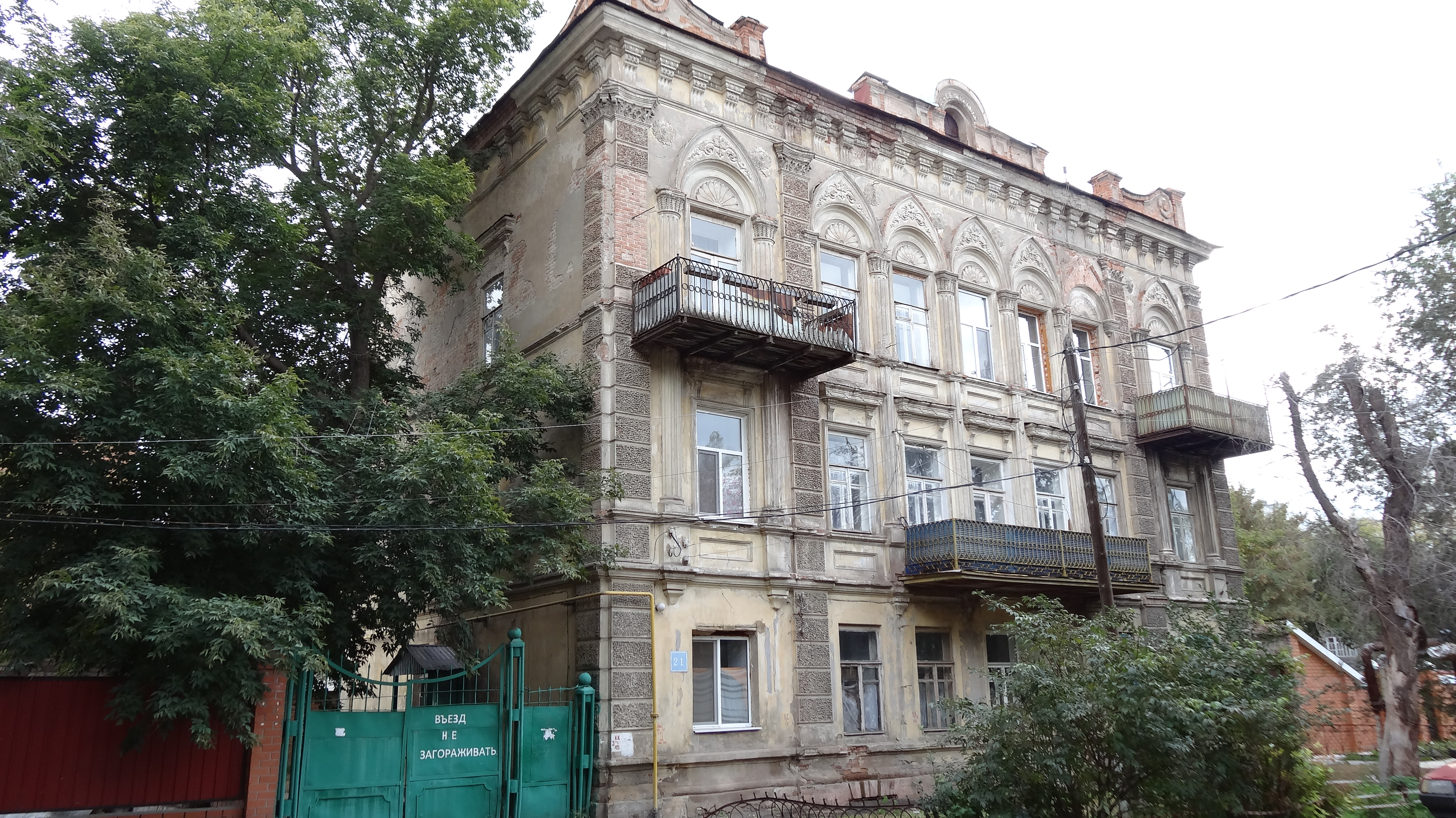
Embassy of the Emirate of Bukhara in Orenburg (2013)

The three-story house is made of bricks and is rectangular in form.
