= Aleksander Burba =

Soviet chemist (1918–1984)

Aleksander Adolfovich Burba OL OOR OBH
- Александр Адольфович Бурба
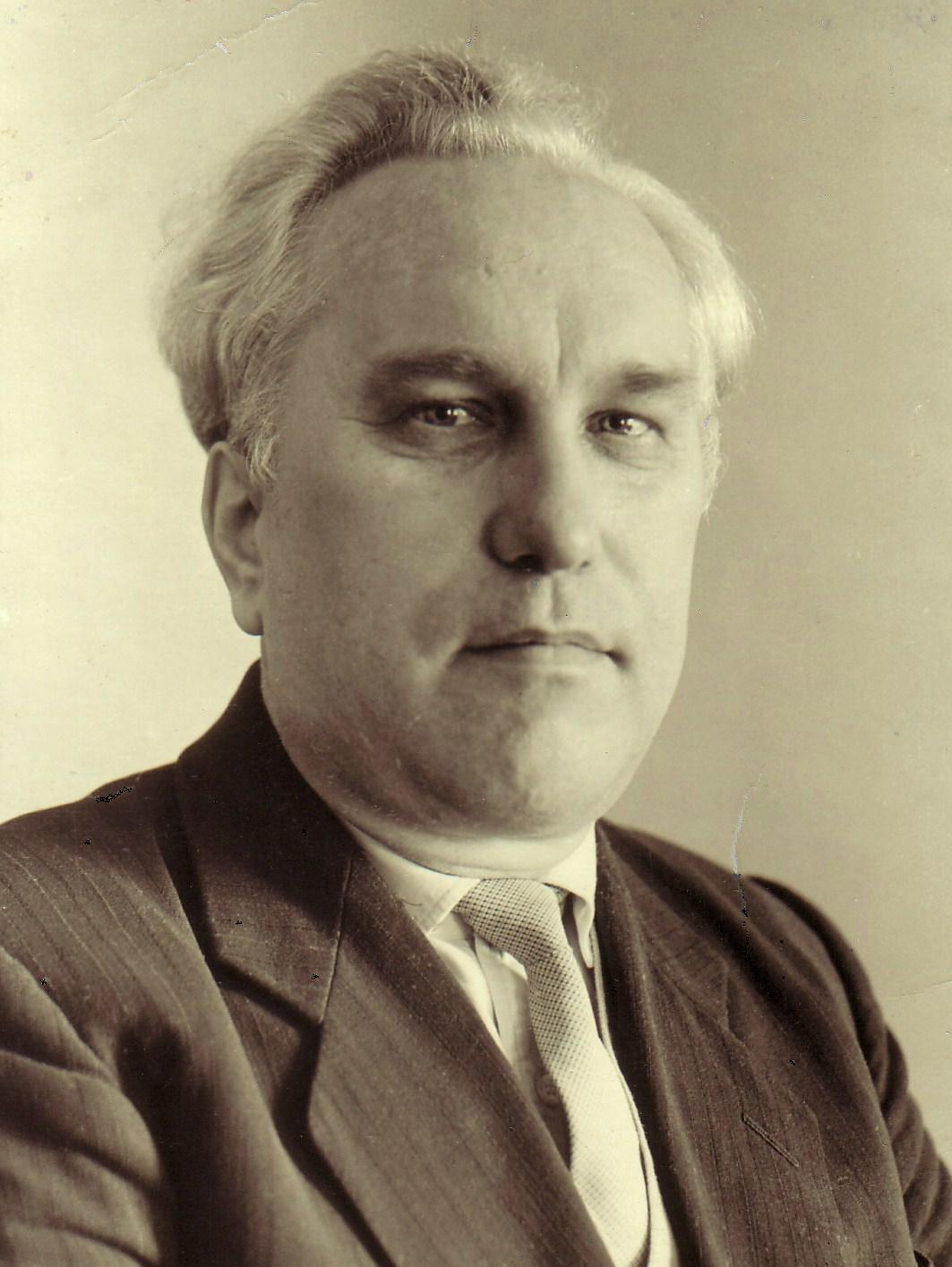
- Burba in 1968
- Born: 6 August 1918; Yenakievo, Yekaterinoslav Governorate, Ukrainian State
- Died: 5 October 1984 (aged 66); Orenburg, Russia, Soviet Union
- Education: Rostov State University (1941)
- Known for: Founder of metallurgy of germanium in Russia
- Awards: Order of Lenin (1961, 1966); Order of October Revolution (1971); Order of the Badge of Honour (1957, 1981); Six medals See more
- Scientific career
- Fields: chemistry, metallurgy
- Workplaces: Hydrochemical Institute of the USSR Academy of Sciences, Mednogorsk Copper-Sulfur Plant , Orenburg Polytechnic Institute
- Doctoral advisor: D. M. Chizhikov

Aleksander Adolfovich Burba (Russian: Алекса́ндр Адо́льфович Бу́рба, IPA: [ɐlʲɪkˈsandr ɐˈdolʲfəvʲɪdʑ ˈburbə]; 6 August 1918 – 5 October 1984) was a Soviet organizer of industry and education, scholar of chemical and metallurgical technologies, and university professor. He served as the Director of the Mednogorsk Copper-Sulfur Plant (1954–1971) and the first Rector (founder) of the Orenburg Polytechnic Institute (now Orenburg State University). Burba was named an Honorary Citizen of Mednogorsk, Orenburg Oblast, in 1979.

== Biography ==
=== Early years ===
Aleksander Burba was born in Yenakievo, Yekaterinoslav Governorate, Ukrainian State. His father, Adolf Bonifatsievich Burba, a native of Lithuania, was a weighman at the Yenakievo Railway Station. His father was awarded a silver pocket watch on behalf of the Russian Tsar Nicholas II with the engraving: "To the best weighman in Russia". Burba began working while still in high school in Rykovo (as the city of Yenakievo was named between 1928 and 1935). For two years he was a teacher of drawing at the same high school where he studied.

=== At the University ===
In 1936, Burba enrolled at Rostov State University in Rostov-on-Don and in 1941 graduated from the Chemistry Department. While studying, he worked from 1937 until 1939 as a teacher of chemistry at the Courses of Industrial Masters in Rostov-on-Don, and, from 1940, as a research assistant at the Hydrochemical Institute of the USSR Academy of Sciences in Novocherkassk, Rostov Oblast. He continued to work at the same Institute after his graduation from the university.

=== Experience in industry ===
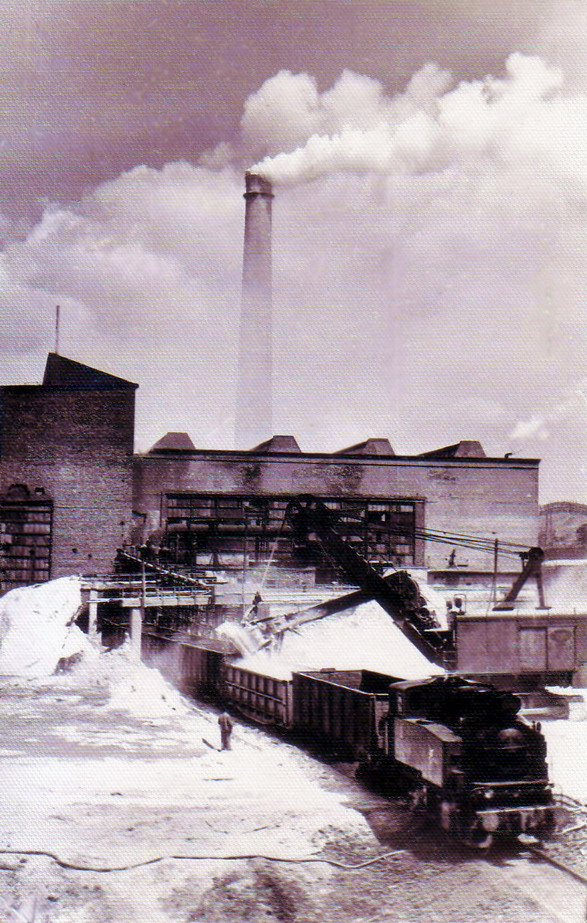
The sulfur storage area off the Chemical Workshop at the MCSP (1960s)

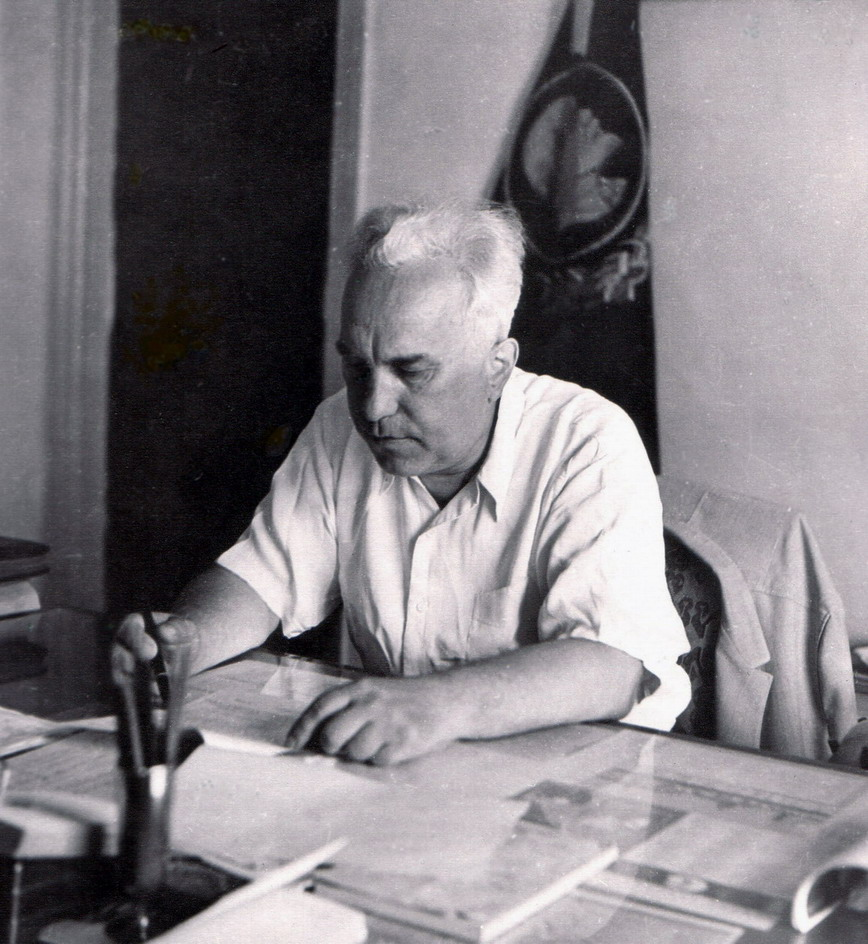
Director of the MCSP in his office (1970)

After the beginning of the German-Soviet period of World War II, Burba was ordered to join the defense-connected enterprise in the town of Mednogorsk, Chkalov (now Orenburg) Oblast. From 1941 to 1954 he worked at the Mednogorsk Copper-Sulfur Plant (MCSP) as Senior Engineer of the Research Department, Head of the Chemical Workshop, and Head of the Industrial Engineering Department. Simultaneously, between 1942 and 1945 he was a teacher at the Industrial School and supervised the industrial training of students of Ural Polytechnic Institute. From 1954 to 1971 he was Director of the Mednogorsk Copper-Sulfur Plant.

In 1968 he obtained the academic degree of Candidate of Technical Sciences (the Russian equivalent of Ph.D.) from the Baykov Institute of Metallurgy of the USSR Academy of Sciences. His dissertation was on the industrial technology of germanium smelting. At that time the production of germanium was classified as secret. The same classification has been applied to Burba's dissertation. For this reason his work was never published in full. The scientific consultant for his thesis was David Chizhikov, a fellow member of the USSR Academy of Sciences.

=== Development of university education ===
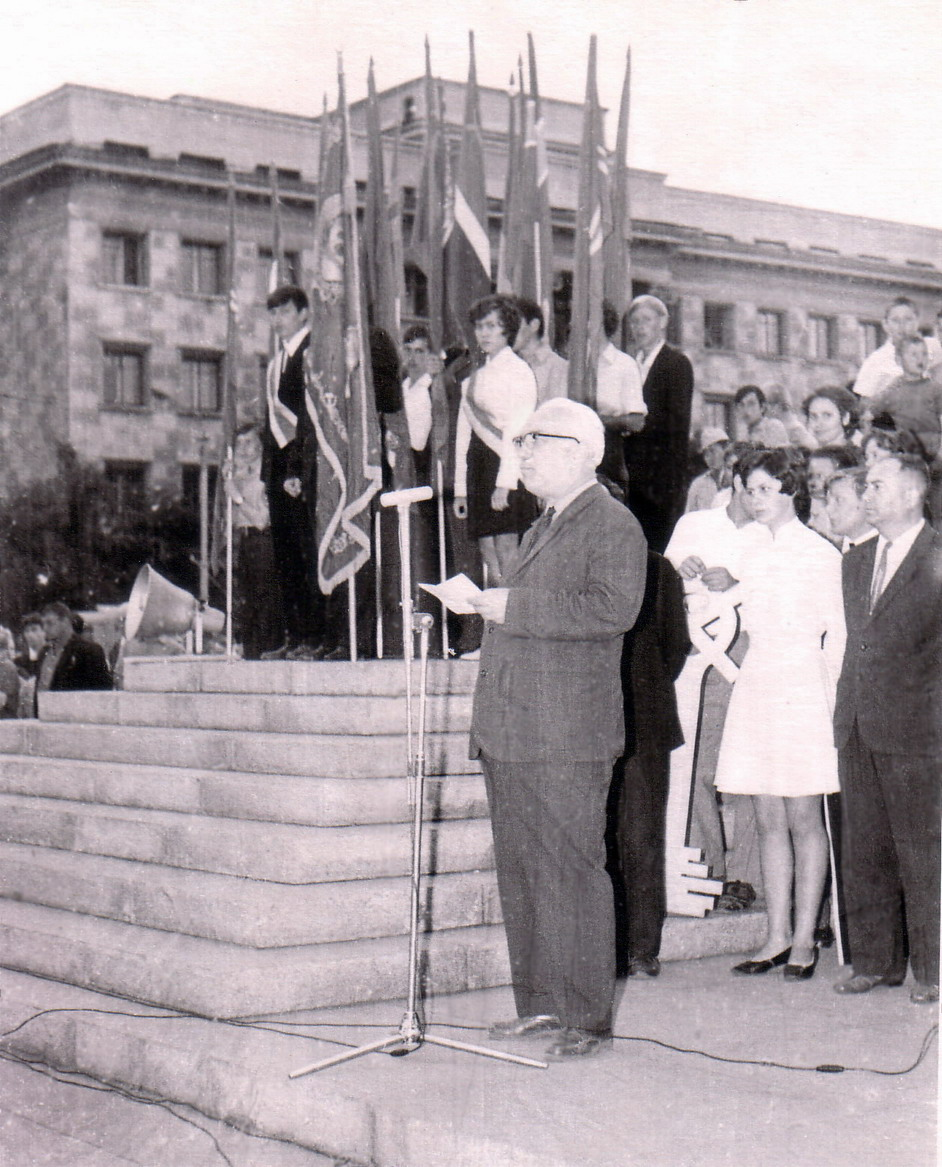
Prof. Burba speaks at the dedication of the new students at the main square in Orenburg (1972)

In 1971, Burba was appointed the Rector of the newly-founded Orenburg Polytechnic Institute. This Institute has since grown into the Orenburg State University. Burba was also Chairman of the Council of Rectors of the Orenburg region. In 1980 Burba obtained the academic title of Professor in the Department of Chemistry from the Higher Attestation Commission under the USSR Council of Ministers. From October 1983, after reaching the age limit for the head of an organization (65), he worked as Head of the Department of Chemistry at the Orenburg Polytechnic Institute.

Aleksander Burba died in Orenburg, Russia, USSR and is buried in Mednogorsk, Orenburg Oblast, in the cemetery near Mayak Mountain.

== Technological achievements ==
Burba obtained 29 author's certificates (a form of inventor's recognition formerly available in the USSR) for his inventions in industrial technology. His scientific and technological research and industrial implementations involved purification of sulphur, production of sulphuric acid, metallurgy of non-ferrous metalls, including rare metals (copper, germanium, lead, selenium, etc.), powder metallurgy, cleaning and recycling of wastes of chemical plants, and environmental protection.

=== Copper-nickel separation smelting ===
In 1941–1942 he was one of the leading development engineers of the technology of separation smelting (so-called top-and-bottom smelting), which resulted in the simultaneous production of both copper and nickel in the water-jacket furnaces at the Mednogorsk Copper-Sulfur Plant. The process was designed to replace the previously used one, when only copper was extracted by smelting. This approach was later named a revolutionary step in non-ferrous metallurgy in Russia.

=== Production of germanium ===
In 1956–1960, Burba played a key role in the development of chemical and metallurgical technology for the extraction of germanium and other rare metals. This technology was introduced into industrial production at the Mednogorsk Copper-Sulfur Plant. A new Dust Processing Workshop was founded there to process dust from copper smelting and ashes from the combustion of steam coal. The founding of this workshop is considered to be the largest event in the non-ferrous metallurgy in the 20th century. The workshop brought more than a million rubles in yearly income. For the first time in the Soviet Union the production of germanium concentrate from metallurgical dust and coal ashes was launched on an industrial scale. Thereafter it became possible to cease the import of germanium, a semiconductor metal, which was in high demand for the electronics industry.

In 1962, with Burba's consultation, a similar workshop was established at the Angren Chemical and Metallurgical Plant in the city of Angren, Uzbekistan (now "Angrenenergotsvetmet"). The Soviet Union then became the world's leading producer of germanium. Production was so abundant that up to 40% of it was exported. After the dissolution of the Soviet Union and until the early 2010s the Mednogorsk Copper-Sulfur Plant was the only producer of germanium concentrate in Russia.

== Awards and decorations ==
Orders
Order of Lenin, twice (1961, 1966)
Order of the October Revolution (1971)
Order of the Badge of Honour, twice (1957, 1981)

WW II medal
Medal "For Valiant Labour in the Great Patriotic War 1941-1945" (1946)

Civil medals
Medal "For Distinguished Labour" (1954)
Medal "Veteran of Labour" (1984)
Medal "For the Development of Virgin Lands" (1957)

Jubilee medals
Medal "In Commemoration of the 100th Anniversary since the Birth of Vladimir Il'ich Lenin" (1970)
Medal "Thirty Years of Victory in the Great Patriotic War 1941-1945" (1975)

Honors
Honorary Citizen of Mednogorsk (1979)
Listed under No.1 in «The Book of Honor» of Orenburg University (1996)
