= Kuzminka =

Kuzminka (Russian: Кузьминка) is the name of several rural localities in Russia:

- Kuzminka, Altai Krai
- Kuzminka, Buzdyaksky District, Republic of Bashkortostan
- Kuzminka, Chishminsky District, Republic of Bashkortostan
- Kuzminka, Perm Krai
- Kuzminka, Volgograd Oblast
- Kuzminka, Belozersky District, Vologda Oblast
- Kuzminka, Kaduysky District, Vologda Oblast
- Kuzminka, Vytegorsky District, Vologda Oblast
