= Kuzminovka =

Kuzminovka (Russian: Кузьминовка) is the name of several settlements in Russia:

- Kuzminovka, Aurgazinsky District, Republic of Bashkortostan
- Kuzminovka, Davlekanovsky District, Republic of Bashkortostan
- Kuzminovka, Kugarchinsky District, Republic of Bashkortostan
- Kuzminovka, Sterlitamaksky District, Republic of Bashkortostan
- Kuzminovka, Fyodorovsky District, Republic of Bashkortostan

== See also ==
- Kuzminka (disambiguation)
- Kuzminov (disambiguation)
- Kuzminivka
