= Museum of Orenburg History =

History museum in Orenburg, Russia

Coordinates: 51.755417°N 55.108325°E

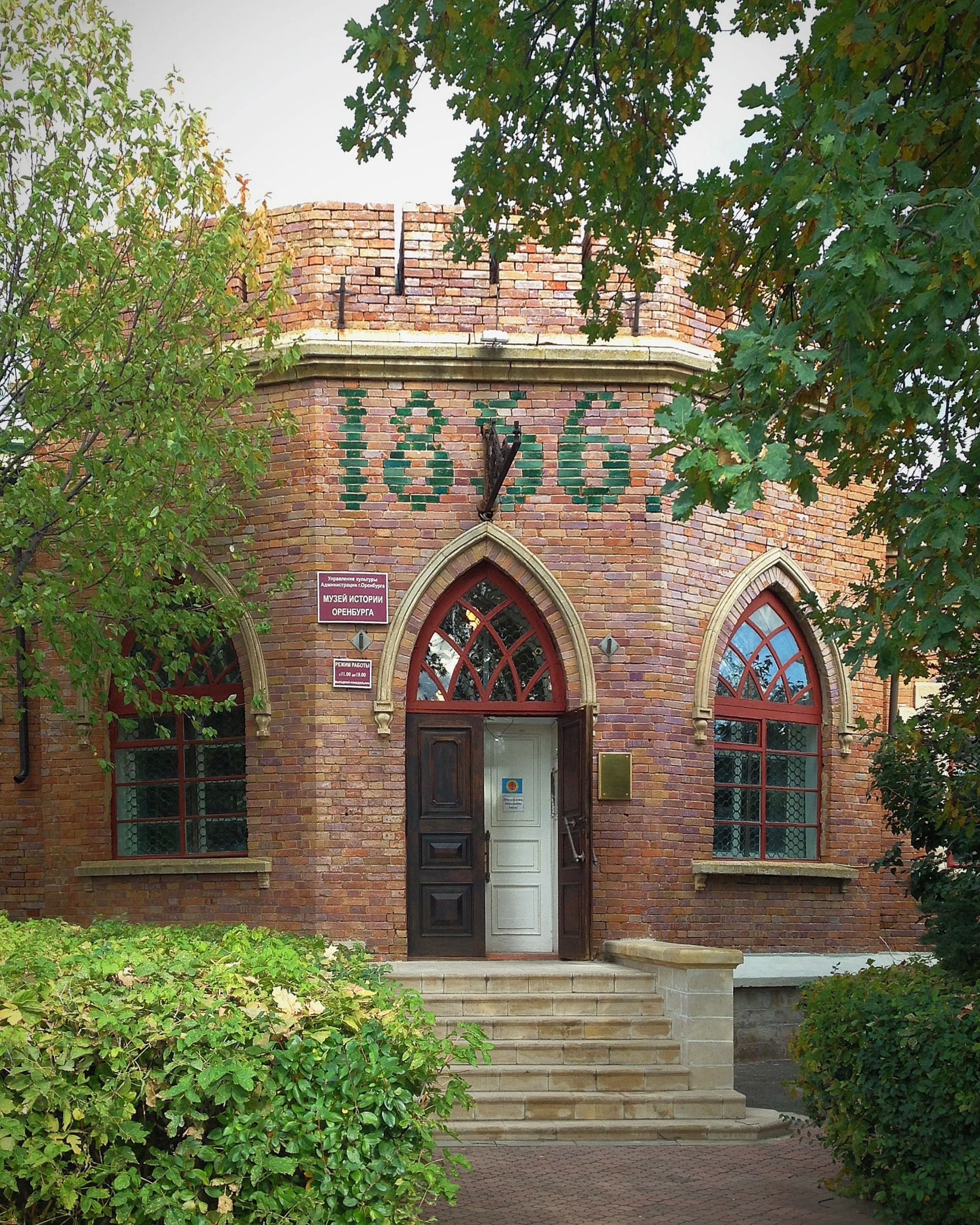
- Main entrance to the museum
- Established: April 30, 1983
- Location: 29, Naberezhnaya Street, Orenburg, 460014, Russia
- Director: Elena Sergeevna Mishina
- Website: http://www.mio56.ru

The Museum of Orenburg History is a municipal and local history museum in Orenburg. It is located in a historical building from the mid-19th century, which is a monument of federal significance. It was opened in 1983 as a department of the pre-Soviet period of Russian history in the Orenburg Governor's Local Lore and History Museum. In 1989, it became an independent Museum of Orenburg History. The museum's main exhibition showcases the city's founding, the Peasants' War led by Yemelyan Pugachev, Alexander Pushkin's stay in Orenburg, and the life of Orenburg residents from the 19th to the early 20th century.

The Museum of Orenburg History has several branches in the city, mostly of a memorial nature. These include the Museum of Taras Shevchenko's guardhouse, the Museum Apartment of Yuri and Valentina Gagarin, the House of Memory, the Museum of Cosmonautics, and the Orenburg Museum of Defenders of the Fatherland named after General M.G. Chernyaev. Previously, the Museum of Orenburg History was a subdivision of the Museum Apartment of Leopold and Mstislav Rostropovich.

== Building ==
The main building of the Museum of Orenburg History is situated in the Belovka historical district, on the elevated bank of the Ural River. Constructed in the mid-19th century, it is now a monument of federal significance for urban planning and architecture.

In 1853, while serving his second term as Governor-General of the Orenburg Governorate, Vasily Perovsky requested the Ministry of Internal Affairs to construct a new storehouse for the Orenburg Treasury. A stone storeroom with a non-commissioned officer's guardroom was constructed using funds collected from the townspeople through a special levy for the construction of offices and prisons. The construction contract was fulfilled by Ivan Petrovich Skalochkin, a self-taught serf architect from the village of Vakhrushovo in Yaroslavsky Uyezd of the Yaroslavl Governorate, the estate of Counts Kutaisov.

The Treasury Storehouse was completed in 1856, three years after construction began. It was built in the original pseudo-Gothic (neo-Gothic) style and resembles a small medieval fortress. The building's plan is in the shape of the letter 'Г', with two flat-roofed wings facing west and north connected by an octagonal tower with double narrow windows-arrowslits. The tower is divided into four tiers by horizontal belts and topped with fortress merlons. It has zvonnitsa openings with bells on crossbars. The tower completes the perspective of one of the central streets of the old part of Orenburg - Dmitrievsky (formerly Atamansky) Lane.

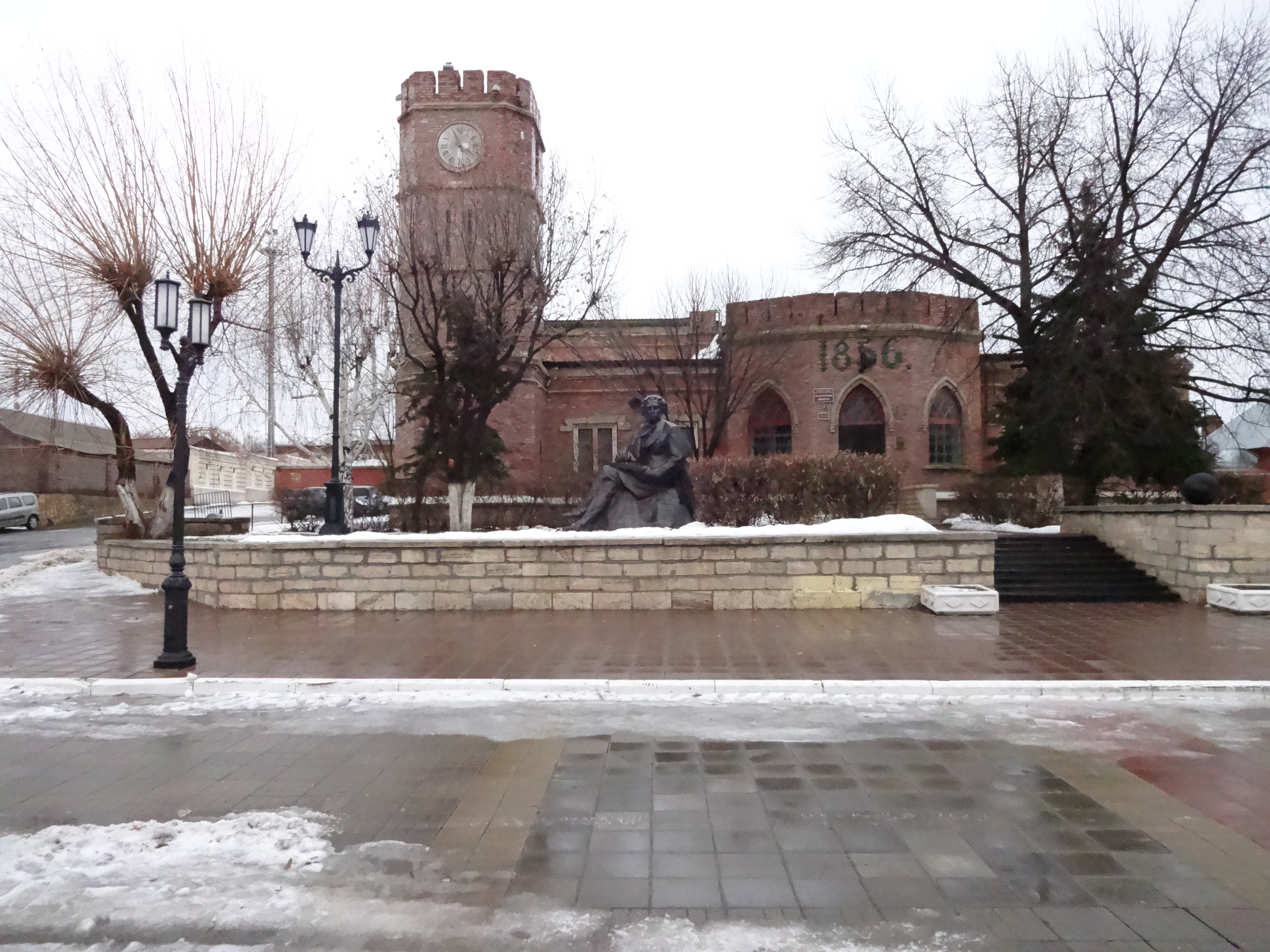
Museum building and monument to Alexander Pushkin in front of it (western facade)

The building's main entrance is situated on the western façade and features a large trihedral avant-corps with dentils above a white stone cornice. The entrance and its adjacent windows are designed with pointed arches, typical of the Gothic style, and are bordered with relief white accents. The brick above the entrance is coloured and bears the date '1856'. The first floor has double window openings with white stone partitions, under white stone horizontal lintels with 'lugs', decorated with projecting pylons. The second storey of the northern facade also has Gothic lancet windows with lintels and weights. The northern facade is decorated with corner turrets, and the central risalite has dentils.

The building's colour scheme is based on a contrast between white stone elements (socle, porches, inter-storey cornices, window cornices with pebbles, window partitions, lintels) and red face bricks with light brown and pink shades. The brick pins (ends) and spoons (sides) are covered with glaze. The internal rooms are arranged in an enfilade layout. The flooring consists of barrel vaults with decks. Notable features of the interior include the staircase with moulded posts and wrought iron grating, as well as the second-floor floors made of light yellow and brown Mettlach tiles with a meander on the border.

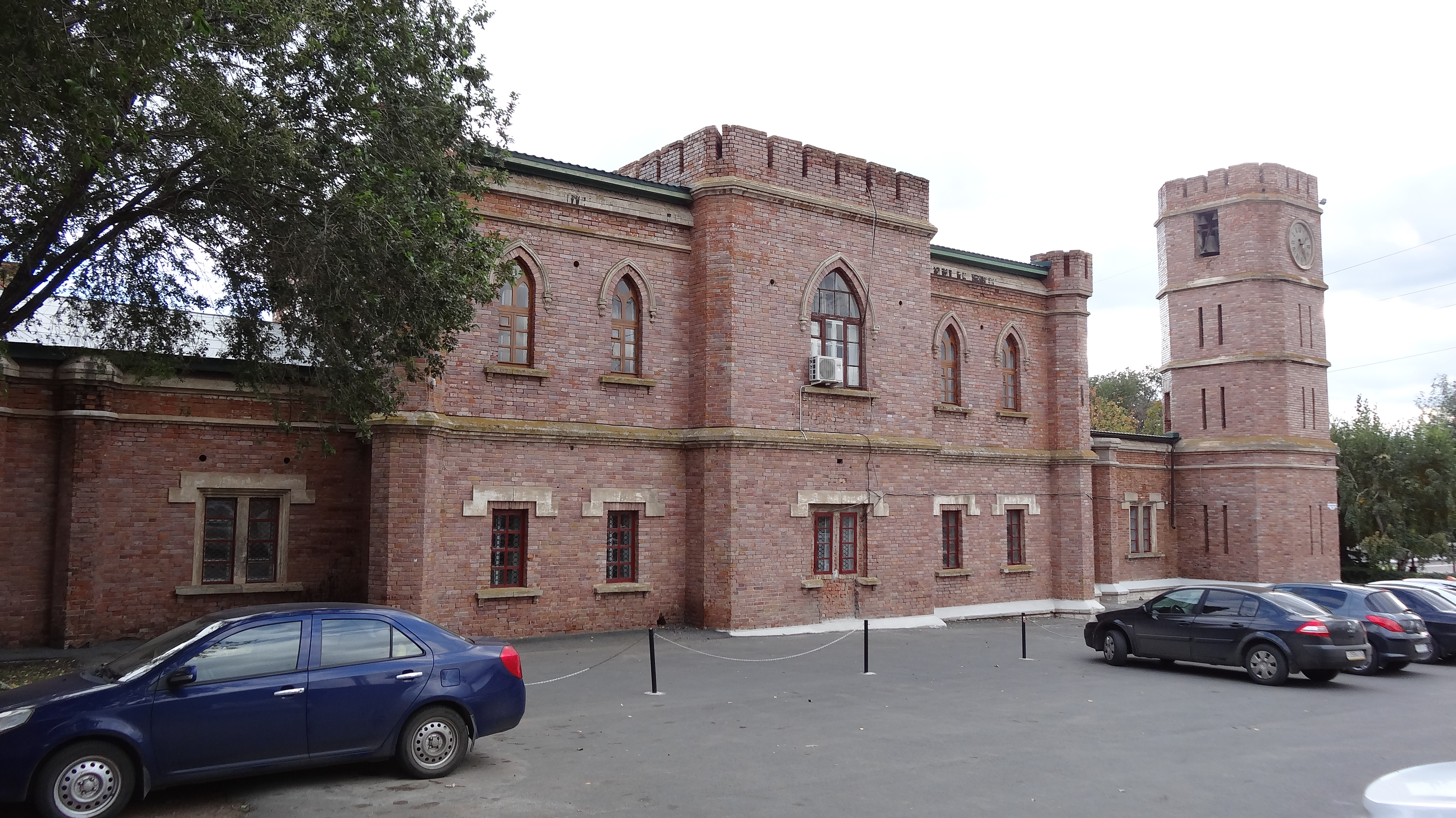
View of the museum building from the city centre (north facade)

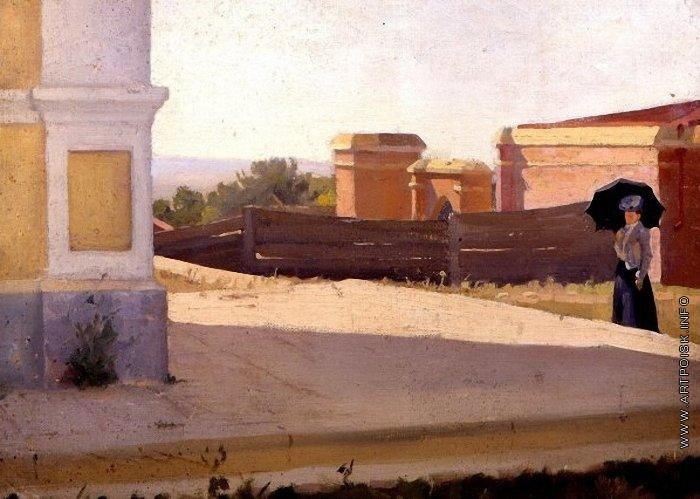
L.V. Popov. City Landscape (mirrored image)

The building's tower was fitted with a clock belonging to the customs department, previously located in Gostiny Dvor of Orenburg. In 1857, Governor-General Alexander Katenin assigned the building to the guardhouse. The guard service was located in the western part of the building, while the northern wing contained cells for prisoners. It is believed that the construction of the guardhouse was depicted in one of the canvases by the Orenburg artist Lukian Popov titled City Landscape (now in the collection of the Orenburg Regional Museum of Fine Arts). The foreground of the painting shows the stone platform of the Transfiguration Cathedral (which was later destroyed), while in the distance, the upper part of the guardhouse can be seen behind an unsightly fence of blackened boards.

The guardhouse's appearance remained largely unchanged until the early 1930s. In 1931, the clock chime from its tower was dismantled and relocated to Samara, to the newly constructed House of the Red Army of the Volga Military District. During the 1970s, a front garden was added, featuring retaining walls made of coquina slabs and an improvised fence in the form of metal balls with chains, in front of the main entrance to the building. In 1977, sculptor V. Stepanyan installed a monument to Alexander Pushkin in the front garden. The guardhouse building served its intended purpose during the Russian Empire and in the USSR until the end of the 1970s.

== Museum history ==
Negotiations for the transfer of the guardhouse's premises to the Orenburg Governor's Local Lore and History Museum have been ongoing since 1970. In 1978, the building was handed over to the city by the Volga Military District thanks to the efforts of Yuri Garankin, the chairman of the Orenburg City Executive Committee, and restoration work began. The museum opened on 30 April 1983, to celebrate the 240th anniversary of the founding of Orenburg. The Orenburg Governor's Local Lore and History Museum initially housed the department dedicated to the pre-Soviet period of Russian history.

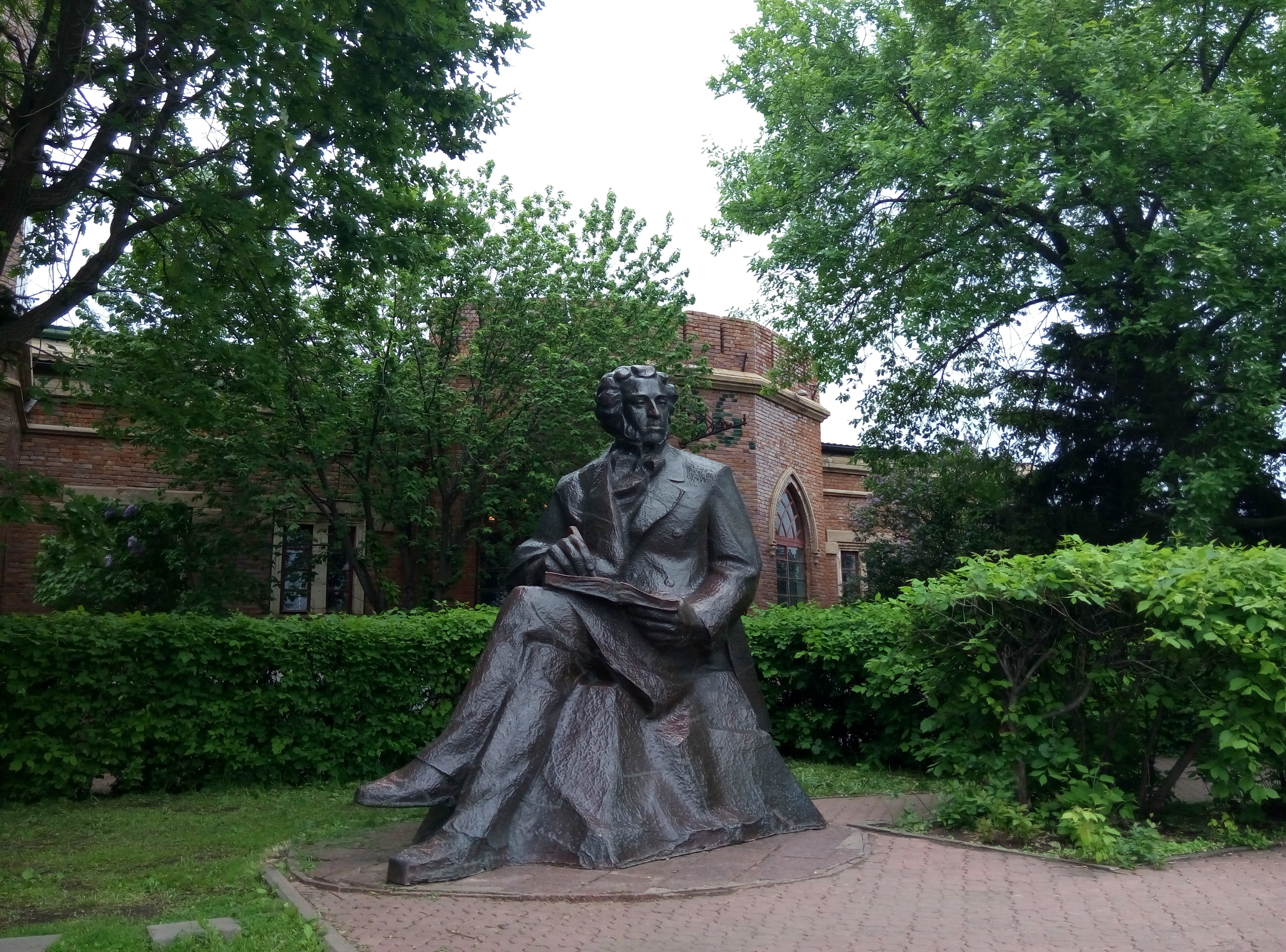
Monument to Pushkin

In the early 1980s, Yuri Garankin initiated the creation of new pendulum clocks with bell chimes for the museum tower. The design, by Orenburg clockmaker N. S. Kuznetsov, included chiselled bronze and cast iron parts from hardware and machine-building plants, as well as 7 bells cast in the Orenburg Diesel Locomotive Repair Plant. The mechanism was assembled by employees of Metalist plant. The chimes indicate the time, while the melody 'The Orenburg Steppes Have Blossomed' by Soviet composer Grigory Ponomarenko is played.

The museum initially housed six halls of exhibitions with various themes:

- ancient history of the Orenburg Region;
- the history of the city's foundation;
- the Peasant War led by Yemelyan Pugachev;
- Alexander Pushkin's stay in Orenburg;
- ethnography, everyday life, system of government of Orenburg in the 19th century, considerable attention was paid to the peoples inhabiting the region (Bashkirs, Tatars, Ukrainians, Germans, Jews, Cossacks);
- famous Orenburg residents (for example, Nikolay Karamzin and Ivan Krylov are sometimes referred to as natives of the region, Gavrila Derzhavin lived in the city as a child) and researchers of the Orenburg region (Alexander von Humboldt, Ivan Lepyokhin, Peter Simon Pallas, Petr Rychkov, Eduard Friedrich Eversmann).

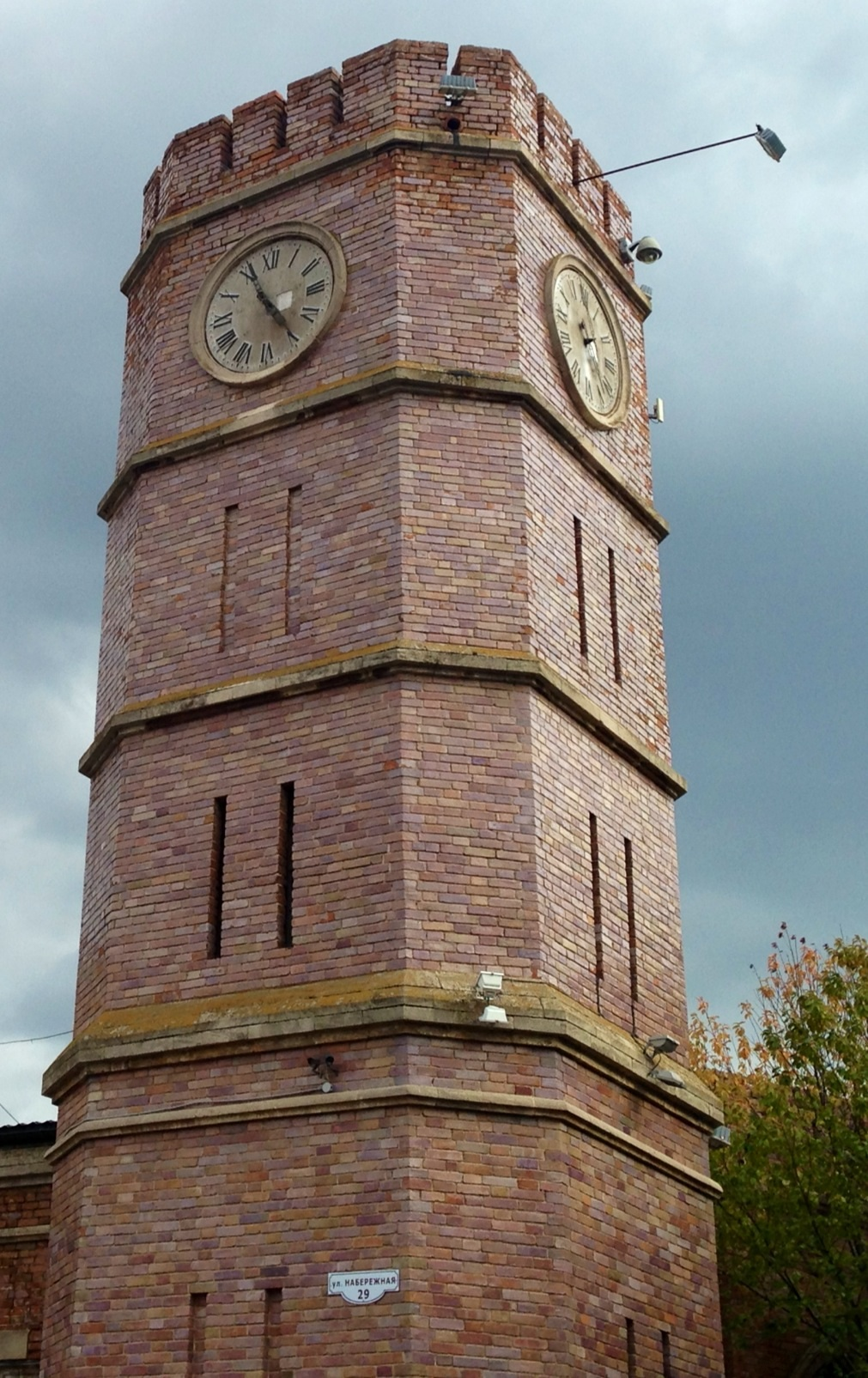
Clock Tower

In 1989, the Department of Pre-Soviet History at the Local History Museum became the independent Museum of Orenburg History.

In 1992, an additional three museum halls were added to the existing six. Three years later, the building was granted the status of a cultural monument of federal significance by the Decree of the President of the Russian Federation. In 2003, new expositions were opened to celebrate the 260th anniversary of the city, including the architecture of Orenburg, the interior of a room belonging to a city dweller from the late 19th to early 20th century, and the exposition titled 'Goodbye, 20th century'. The Orenburg History Museum has received six branches since its establishment: two in 1989, two in 2001, and one each in 2003, 2007, and 2014. As of 2016, the museum has welcomed over 1.5 million visitors, including notable figures such as Mikhail Gluzsky, Mikhail Alexandrovich Ulyanov, Yevgeny Yevtushenko, Lyubov Tolkalina, and others.

== Rostopovich family's Museum Apartment ==
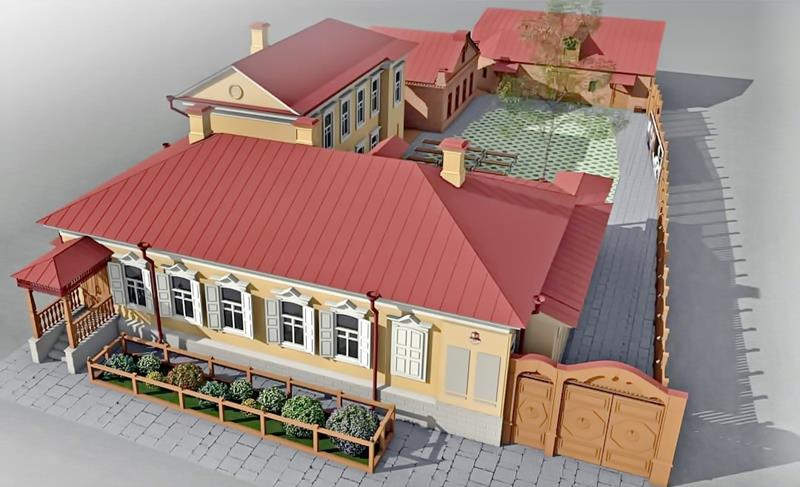
Rostopovich family's Museum Apartment

Between 2001 and 2018, the Museum of Orenburh History's structural subdivision was the Museum Apartment of Leopold and Mstislav Rostropovich. The museum is located in house No. 25 on Ziminskaya Street, where Mstislav Rostropovich lived with his parents, Leopold Rostropovich and Sofia Fedotova, and his sister Veronika during the evacuation period of 1941–1943. The museum opened in November 2001 with the assistance of Yuri Mischeriakov, the head of the Orenburg administration. A part of the building was purchased by the municipality to house the museum exposition. Mstislav Rostropovich was in attendance at the opening.

The second half of the house was privately owned, and in the early 2000s, a conflict arose between the owners and the municipality. This conflict resulted in the forced evacuation of the museum rooms with the assistance of bailiffs. The Rostropovich House-Museum has recreated the memorial interior and displayed photographs of the family, items from the Great Patriotic War, and Mstislav Rostropovich's concert costume. The museum hosted musical evenings, concerts, festivals, and educational activities such as classes and lectures.

The second half of the house was occupied by a private Rostropovich museum. In 2012, the owners put their premises up for sale. In 2018, the regional authorities, led by Governor Yuri Berg, purchased half of the building from the private owners, along with the exhibits. The rooms that previously housed the 'municipal' exposition are now regional property. The Joint Museum has been relocated to the Orenburg Regional Museum of Fine Arts.

== Exposition ==
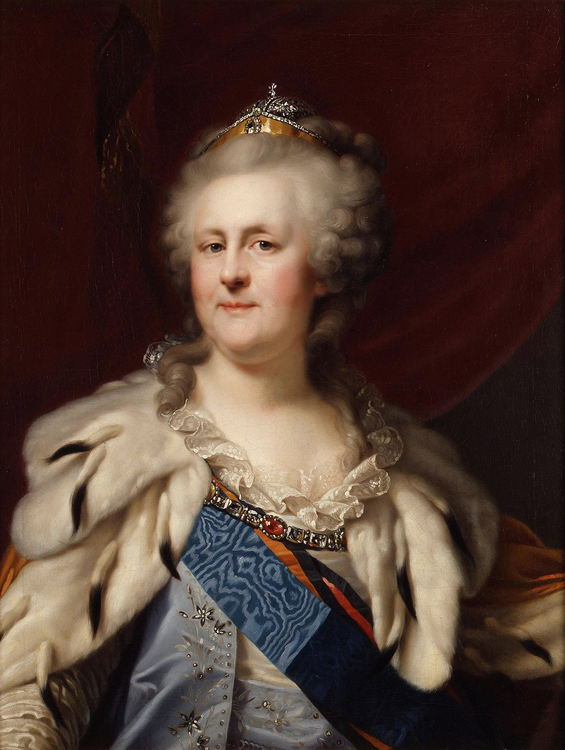
A pectoral version of a lifetime portrait of Catherine II by Johann Lampi

The museum has an exhibition area of 1225 m^{2}, 150 m^{2} of storage space, and 0.4 hectares of greenery. The collection comprises 8.7 thousand items. It includes Bashkir, Kazakh, and Mordovian national dress, personal belongings, and photographs of the poet Yuri Entin, opera singer Lyudmila Filatova, actor Viktor Bortsov, as well as photographs of Heroes of the Soviet Union and Heroes of the Russian Federation, among others.

As of 2018, the following permanent exhibitions are presented in the main building of the Museum of Orenburg History:

- Exposition in the foyer of the museum. The central place is occupied by the painting "Orenburg in Three Centuries" created by Orenburg artists A.A. Vlasenko and V.M. Yeremenko during the reconstruction of the guardhouse building for museum needs. The canvas is divided into three parts and showcases the history of Orenburg in the 18th, 19th, and 20th centuries. It was created using 19th-century views of the city by Bronisław Zaleski and Alexey Chernyshyov, as well as old prints and drawings. The museum also houses a valuable exhibit - a pectoral version of Johann Baptist von Lampi the Elder's lifetime portrait of Catherine II. The portrait was presented to the city in 1998 to commemorate the 255th anniversary of the founding of Orenburg by the artist Ilya Glazunov.
- The exhibition titled 'History of the founding of Orenburg'. It features a model of the Orenburg fortress from the middle and second half of the 18th century as its main element. Additionally, a typical shop from that period, belonging to a merchant from Central Asia, has been recreated. The shop contains various goods such as clothes, crockery, household items, and ancient coins. The exhibition includes a bronze cannon from 1703, a fragment of the first city water pipe, and various objects and documents from the 18th century related to statesmen such as Ivan Kirillov, Ivan Neplyuyev, P.I. Rychkov, and Vasily Tatishchev. Engravings and fragments of the Elizabethan gates are also on display. The language used is clear, concise, and objective, with a formal register and precise word choice.
- "Peasant War of 1773-1775 under the leadership of Y.I. Pugachev". The main exhibits include a diorama depicting "The Storming of the Fortress City of Orenburg by the Rebel Army of E.I. Pugachev", a map of the Peasant War, cannonballs, a signal cannon from that period, and a replica of the cage in which Pugachev was held captive for some time. The exposition was supplemented with the items of props of the historical film The Captain's Daughter based on Pushkin's story The Captain's Daughter about the events of Pugachev's uprising, such as gun carriages and rebel banners. The movie was filmed in 1998–1999 in the Orenburg Oblast.

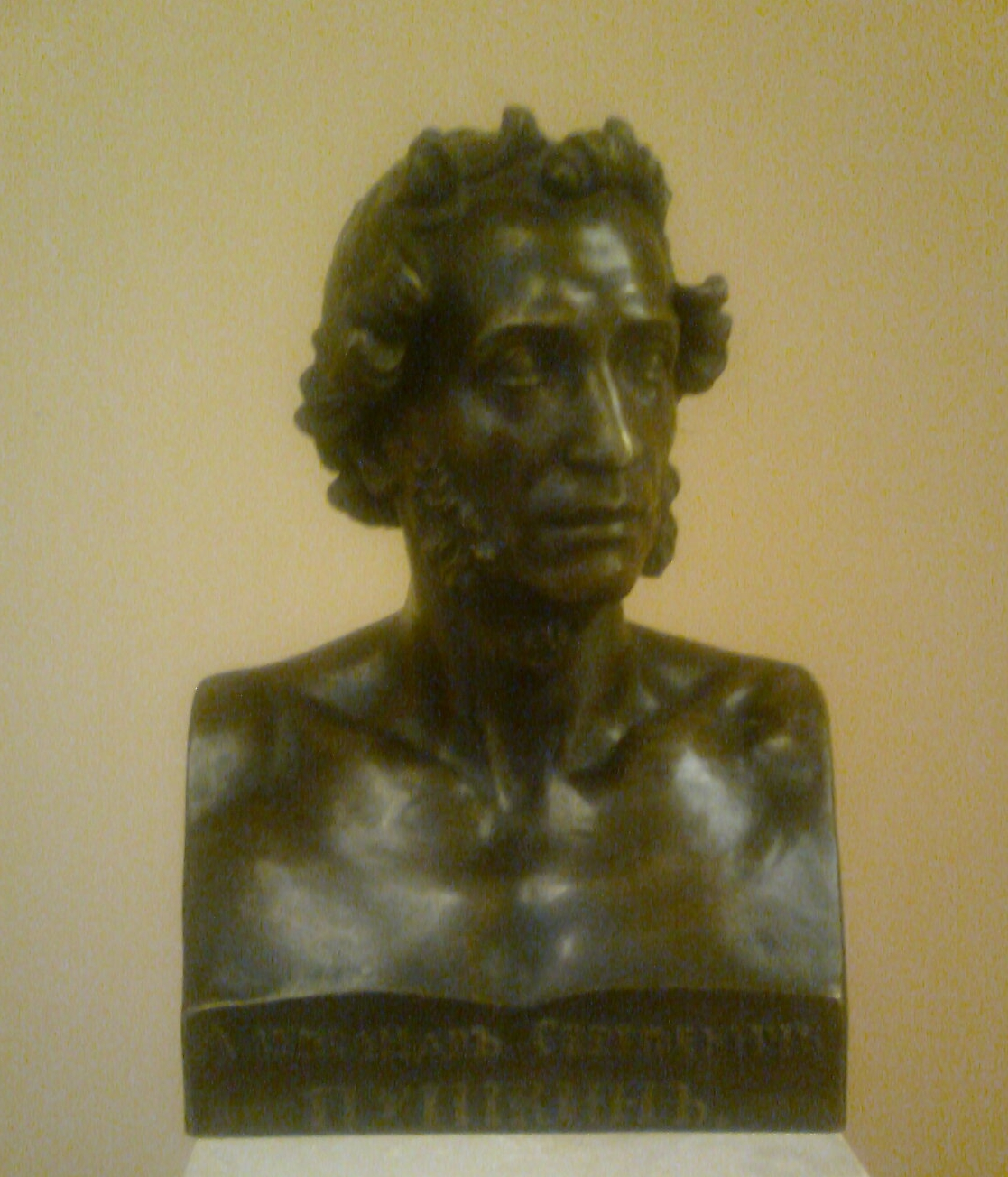
Original bust of Alexander Pushkin by I. P. Vitali in the collection of the State Russian Museum

- "А. S. Pushkin and Orenburg". The exposition is about Alexander Pushkin's visit to Orenburg from 18 to 20 September 1833. He was accompanied by Vladimir Dal on a journey through the Orenburg province to collect information about the Pugachev rebellion, including eyewitness accounts for the A History of Pugachev and for later written Captain's Daughter. The hall features canvases by Orenburg artist Nikolay Eryshev, including A.S. Pushkin and V.I. Dal on the Bank of Ural and Pushkin's Conversation with the Cossack Buntova in the Berdskaya Sloboda. The interior of the noble drawing room is from the first half of the 19th century. It also contains a bust of Pushkin made of Kasli cast iron in 1899. This sculpture was produced at the Kaslinsky foundry based on a marble bust by Ivan Vitali. The bust was created with the participation of Pavel Nashchokin after Alexander Pushkin's death.
- "Interior of the room of an Orenburg citizen of the end of the 19th - beginning of the 20th century". It includes a Polish Art Nouveau sideboard, an Austrian Rococo piano, Rococo armchairs by Gambs, bentwood chairs by Tonet brothers, a locally made table, and a chest of drawers. The museum received this interior from the heirs of the Orenburg horse breeder Ivanov. The collection of tableware includes porcelain from the Kuznetsov porcelain and faience factory, silver tableware, pseudo-Russian style faience and glass from the Maltsov factories. There is also clothing from the time period (handmade openwork women's jackets, corsets, men's dickeys, silk handkerchiefs, shoes, etc.)
- "The Fate of a Fleeting Style: Russian Art Nouveau in Orenburg". This exhibition recreates the interiors of a bedroom and study from the turn of the 19th and 20th centuries, using furniture and household items in the Art Nouveau style. It demonstrates the unique characteristics of Art Nouveau in the Russian province during this historical period.

== Branches ==
=== Museum of Taras Shevchenko's guardhouse ===
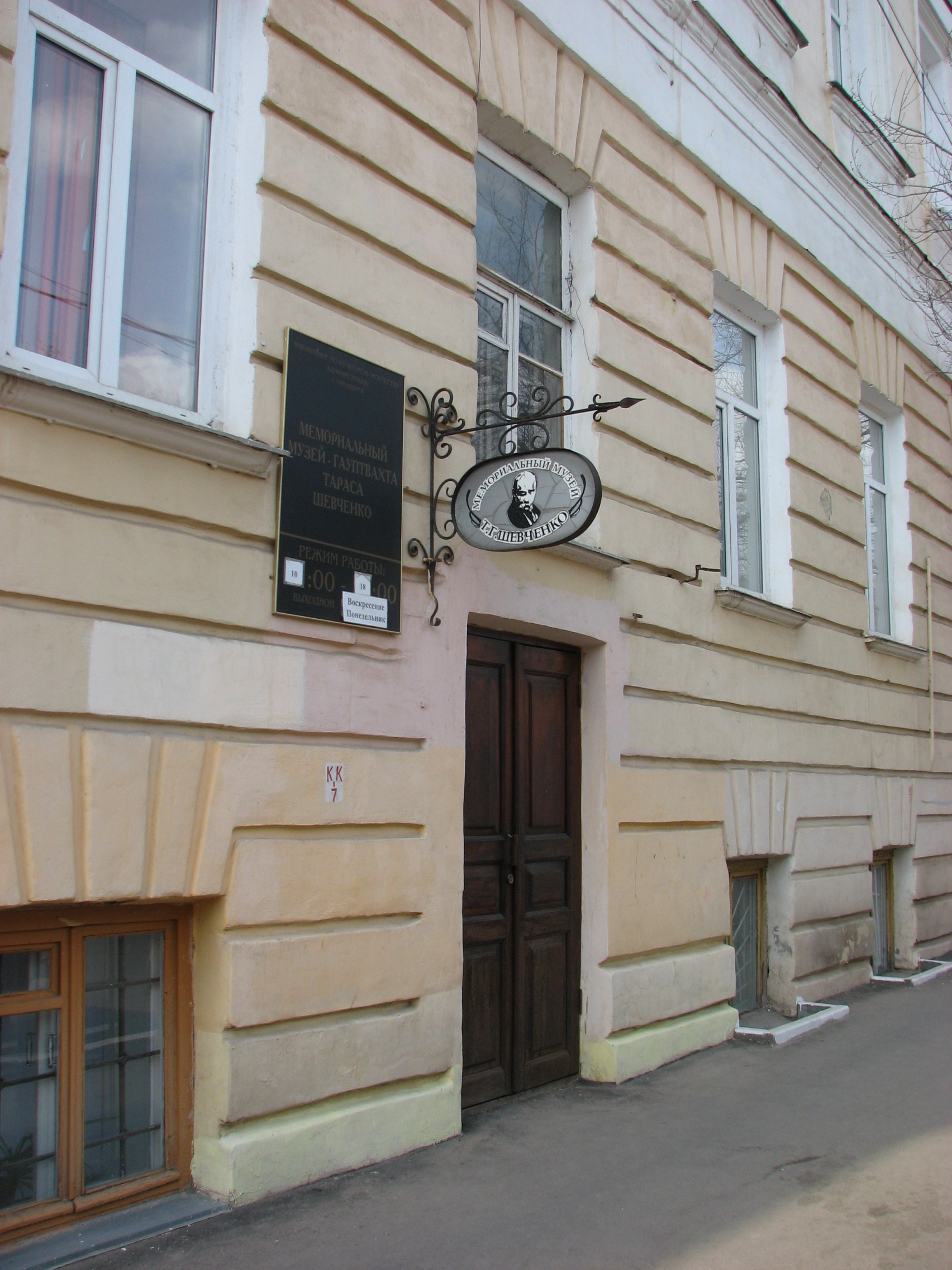
Museum of Taras Shevchenko's guardhouse

The Museum of Taras Shevchenko's guardhouse is located at 8 Pravdy St. / 24 Sovetskaya St. It is situated in the basement of the physico-mathematical lyceum building, which served as the city guardhouse in 1850. Taras Shevchenko, who was serving military service in the Orenburg region as a political exile since 1847, was also held here.

The museum building was constructed between 1836 and 1841 (or completed after 1842). It was presumably built according to the project of Andrey Gopius, the army architect of the Ural Cossack Army. The building was originally named the 'House of Special Purpose' and was intended to accommodate the engineering and general staff. From 1842 or 1844, the 2nd squadron of the Orenburg Neplyuev Military School was located here, with a brigade occupying the southern part of the first floor, which now faces Pravdy Street. It was first used as a teachers' institute in 1878, then as a real school from 1894, and later as the workers' faculty of the Kazan National Research Technological University from 1921 to 1933. Since 1935, it had been known as School No. 30, and since 2010, it has been a physics and mathematics lyceum. During the Great Patriotic War, it also served as hospital No. 16-58. Notably, the building has been recognised as a cultural heritage monument of regional significance since 1987.

In 1847, Taras Shevchenko was exiled to the Orenburg region due to his involvement with the Brotherhood of Saints Cyril and Methodius and his inappropriate poems, some of which contained insults towards the Emperor and Empress. The Third Section's decision to exile him also included a prohibition on writing and drawing, and he was sent to the Orenburg guardhouse based on the report of Officer N. Isaev, who claimed that Shevchenko was still writing and drawing. Shevchenko was detained in the guardhouse from 27 April to 12 May 1850. Later that year, he was sent to the Novopetrovskoe fortification on the Caspian Sea.

The museum was established by the executive committee of the Orenburg City Council (decision No. 80, 23 January 1984) and opened on 9 March 1989, to commemorate the 175th anniversary of Taras Shevchenko's birth. It has been reported that Kyiv artist Anatoly Gaydamaka provided assistance in creating the museum. The exposition comprises approximately 200 items, including a recreated cell where Shevchenko was held in 1850. At the entrance of the guardhouse, there is a statue of a Cossack. Inside the guardhouse, there is an officer and a soldier in full uniform. The museum also features portraits of local residents, exiled friends, landscapes, and pictures of Taras Shevchenko. Additionally, since 2006, there has been an exposition dedicated to the political repressions of the 1930s-1950s.

=== Museum Apartment of Yuri and Valentina Gagarin ===
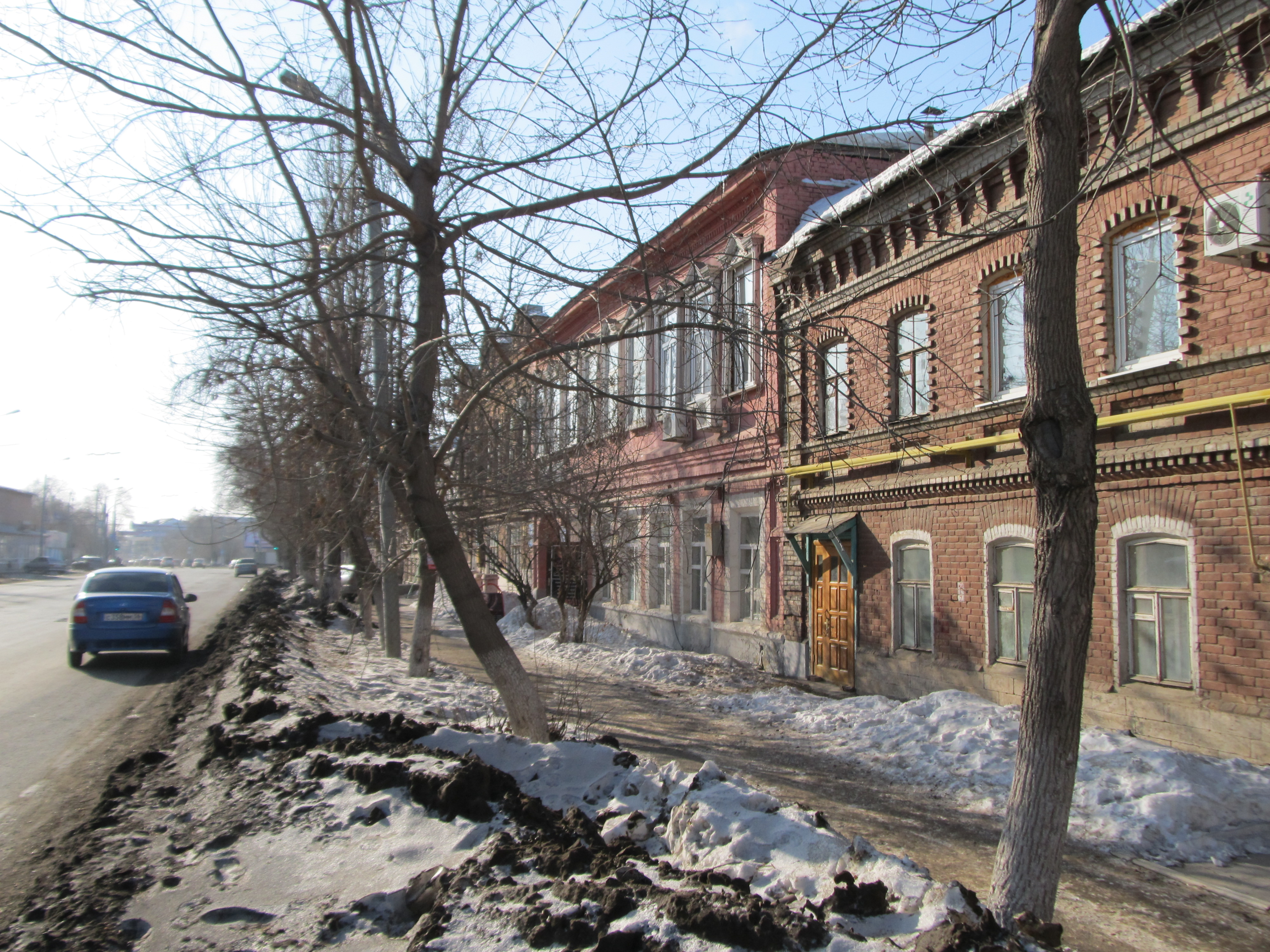
Museum Apartment of Yuri and Valentina Gagarin

The Museum Apartment of Yuri and Valentina Gagarin, located at 35 Chicherina Street, is a museum that showcases the house where Valentina Goryacheva (later married Gagarina) lived with her parents. It is also the site of the wedding of Yuri Gagarin, the first cosmonaut, and Valentina in 1957.

The Goryachev family resided in one of the rooms of a communal apartment for six families on the second floor of a former merchant's house. The house, built in 1905–1906 in the so-called 'brick style', belonged to A.T. Titev. On the first floor, there was a boarding school for visually impaired children. On 27 October 1957, Valentina Goryacheva married Yuri Gagarin, who was a cadet of the Orenburg Higher Military Aviation School for Pilots from 1955 to 1957. For a period of time, the Gagarins resided at 35 Chicherina Street in the same room as Valentina's parents until Yuri departed for his place of service in the Northern Fleet aviation.

The Yuri Gagarin Museum was established in this building shortly after his death in 1969 as a school museum for visually impaired children. Since 1993, the house has been designated as a cultural heritage monument of regional significance. The institution opened in April 2001 as a branch of the Museum of Orenburg History, with the assistance of the head of the Orenburg administration Yuri Mischeriakov, to commemorate the 40th anniversary of the first space flight. An updated and expanded exposition was opened on 9 March 2014, in honour of the 80th anniversary of the birth of Yuri Gagarin. The museum was closed in 2016 due to the emergency condition of the old building. It was reopened in 2021 on the 60th anniversary of the first space flight after restoration.

The museum halls feature a memorial interior of the Goryachev family room, the kitchen of a communal flat, a hall detailing Gagarin's stay in Orenburg, and a multimedia hall for watching films about Yuri Gagarin. The exhibits include authentic items from the first cosmonaut's family, such as a bedspread, curtains embroidered by Valentina Gagarina, and her dresses from the 1950s-1970s, which were donated to the museum. The furniture on display is from the corresponding epoch. The film showcases the life of the first cosmonaut and his family, along with chronicles featuring Gagarin in Star City. Additionally, visitors can experience a simulated expedition to the International Space Station through the use of virtual reality technology.

Valentina Gagarina and members of her family, as well as cosmonauts Valentina Tereshkova, Yuri Lonchakov, Gennady Manakov, Yuri Romanenko and Roman Romanenko have been honoured guests of the museum in different years.

=== House of Memory ===
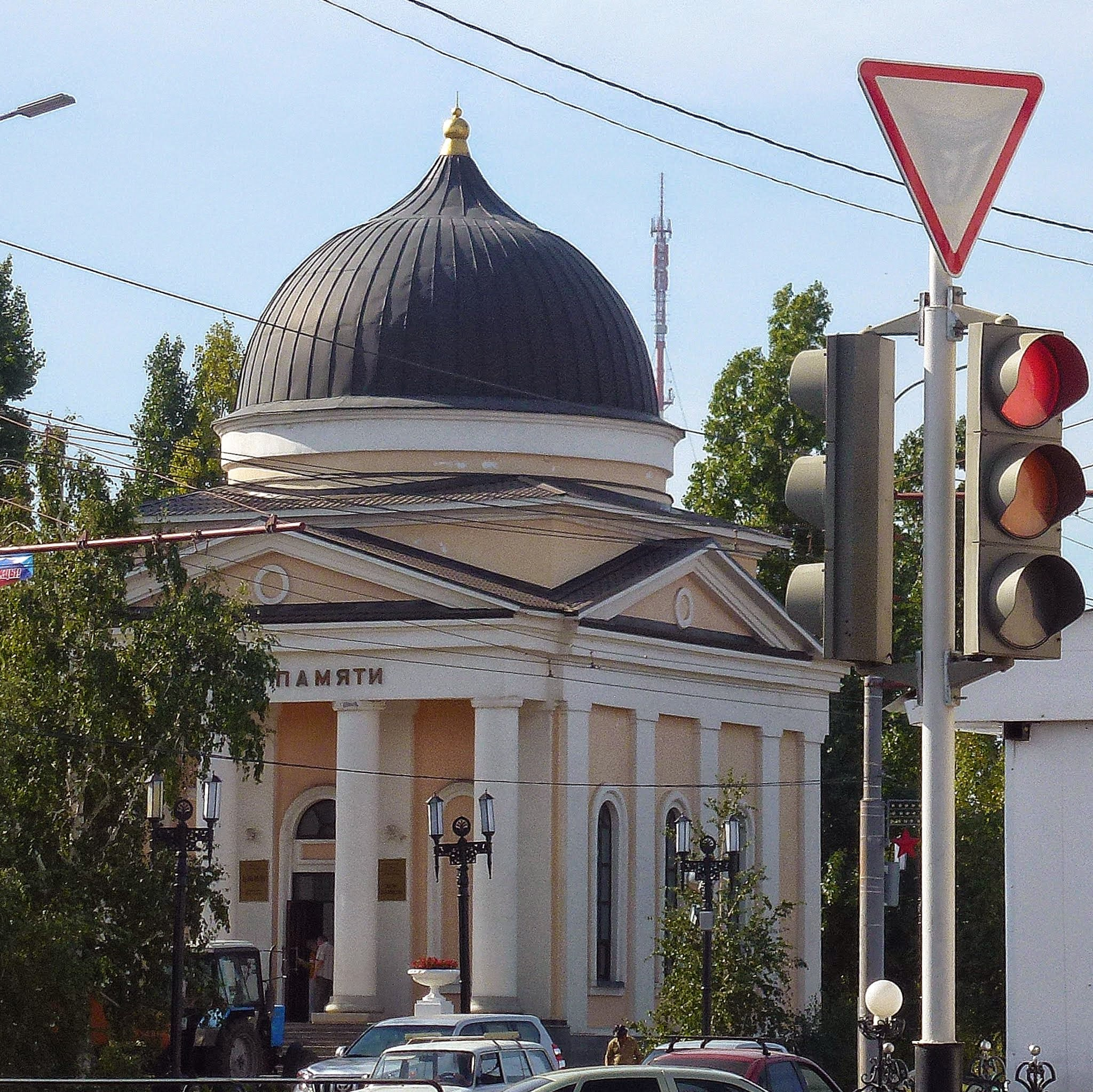
House of Memory

The House of Memory is a memorial museum situated on Pobedy Avenue, in close proximity to the Eternal Flame memorial. It serves as a semantic continuation of the latter.

The building of the museum in the form of a eukterion, in strict classical style, designed by architect S.E. Smirnov, was laid on 22 June 2000 in the presence of the Mayor of Orenburg Genady Donkovtsev and the former head of the city, honorary citizen Y.D. Garankin. The opening took place on 15 August 2003.

The museum's purpose is to preserve the memory of Orenburg's residents. A computer database and desk albums in the central hall of the museum (covering the period from 1900 to 1955) record the names of citizens buried in the city. Additionally, since 1999, the museum has published the 'Book of Memory' which contains the names of all Orenburg residents who died during the year, along with detailed information about prominent citizens. These books are also archived in the museum. The museum's marble plaques display the names of soldiers who died in Afghanistan, Orenburg residents who helped to clean up after the Chernobyl disaster, police officers who died in the line of duty, and Orenburg residents who died during military operations in the Caucasus in the 1990s and 2000s.

The museum keeps 'Books of Memory' to commemorate those who died during the Great Patriotic War, the war in Afghanistan, and victims of political repression. Additionally, the museum staff compiles lists of veterans of the Great Patriotic War who died in the post-war period, which are placed on the slabs of the Eternal Flame memorial. The House of Memory organises exhibitions for Victory Day and events on the Day of Remembrance of Soldiers-internationalists. The museum has a permanent exhibition titled 'Honourable Citizens of Orenburg.' In 2014, a bust of Yury Garankin, who participated in the laying of the House of Memory, was erected in the park adjacent to the museum.

=== Museum of Cosmonautics ===
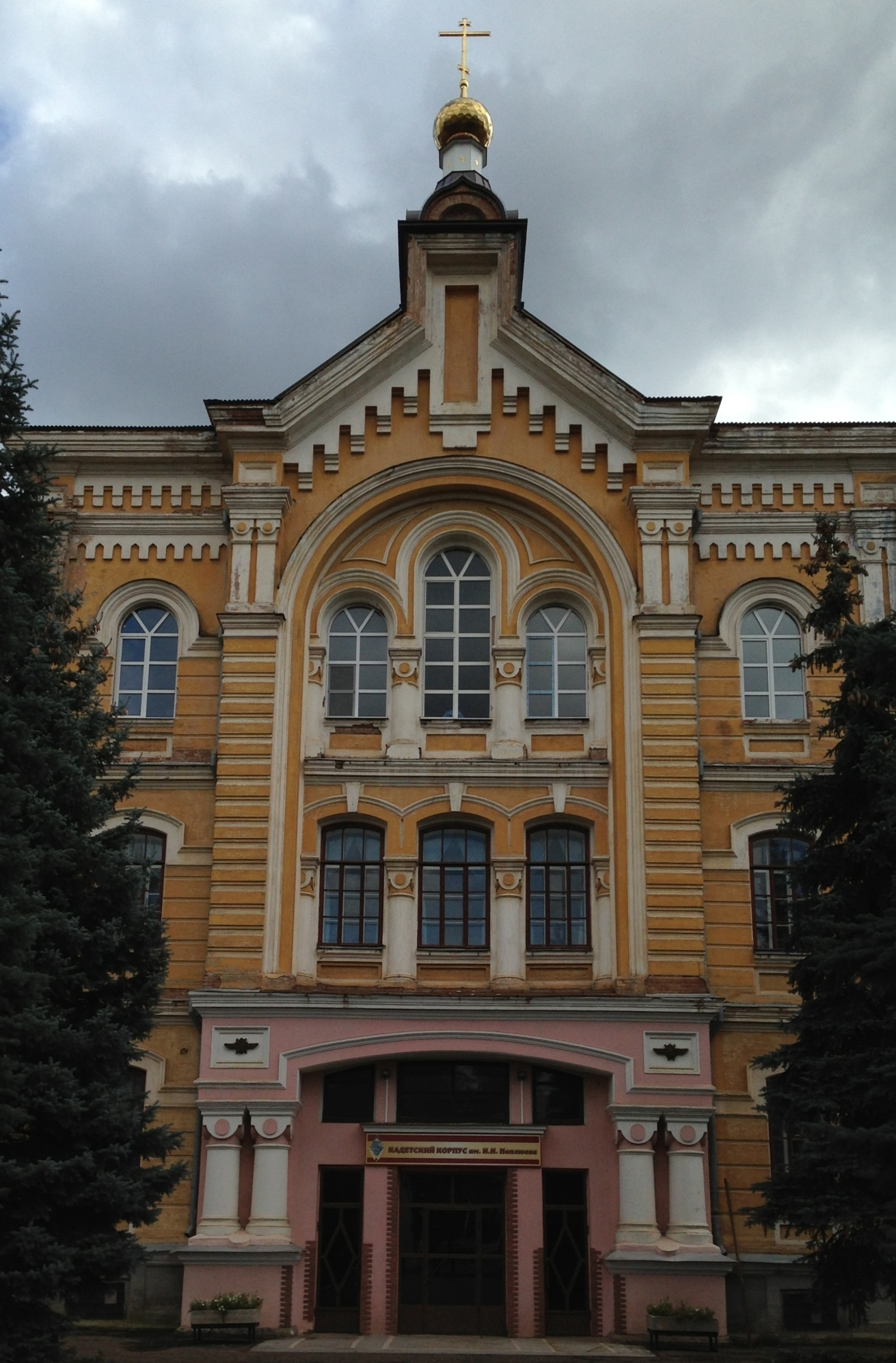
17 Chelyuskintsev street

The Museum of Cosmonautics, located at 17 Chelyuskintsev Street, was previously the museum of history and military glory of the Orenburg Higher Military Aviation School for Pilots. It has since been transferred to the Museum of Orenburg History.

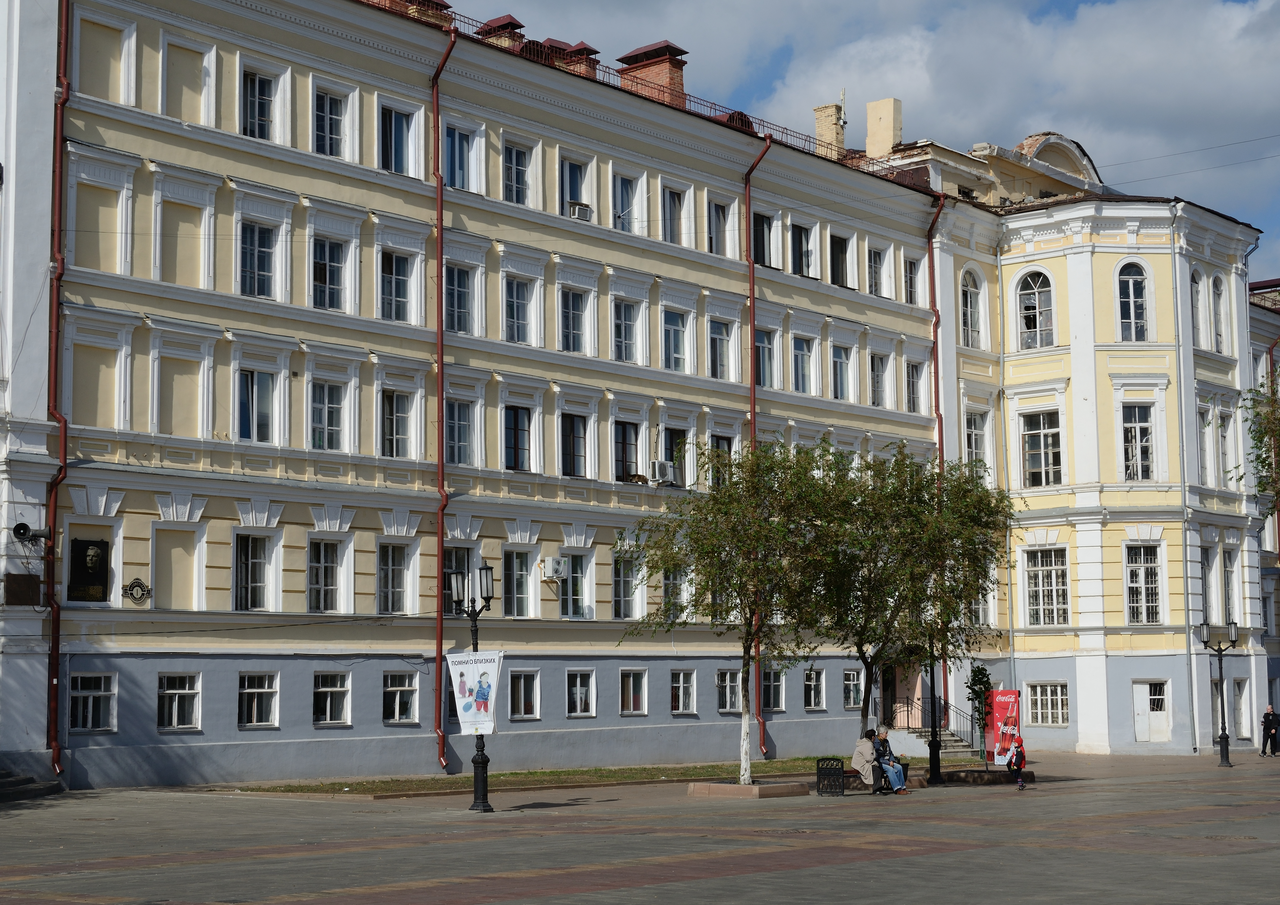
Sovetskaya Street, 1. A memorial plaque to Yuri Gagarin is visible

The museum building was constructed at the behest of Governor-General N. A. Kryzhanovsky of the Orenburg Province. It was built on the site of the former Forstadtskaya (or Voiskovaya) Square for the Orenburg Theological Seminary. The seminary's main building was constructed in the Russian-Byzantine style with the participation of F. D. Markelov, the diocesan architect of the Orenburg diocese. The technical and construction committee of the Ministry of Internal Affairs drew up the building's project, which was approved by the Minister General of the Cavalry Alexander Timashev. The building was completed on 11 January 1883, after the rejection of a project developed in Orenburg in 1876. On 24 August 1884, Bishop Veniamin of Orenburg consecrated the seminary and its church, which had been opened the previous year.

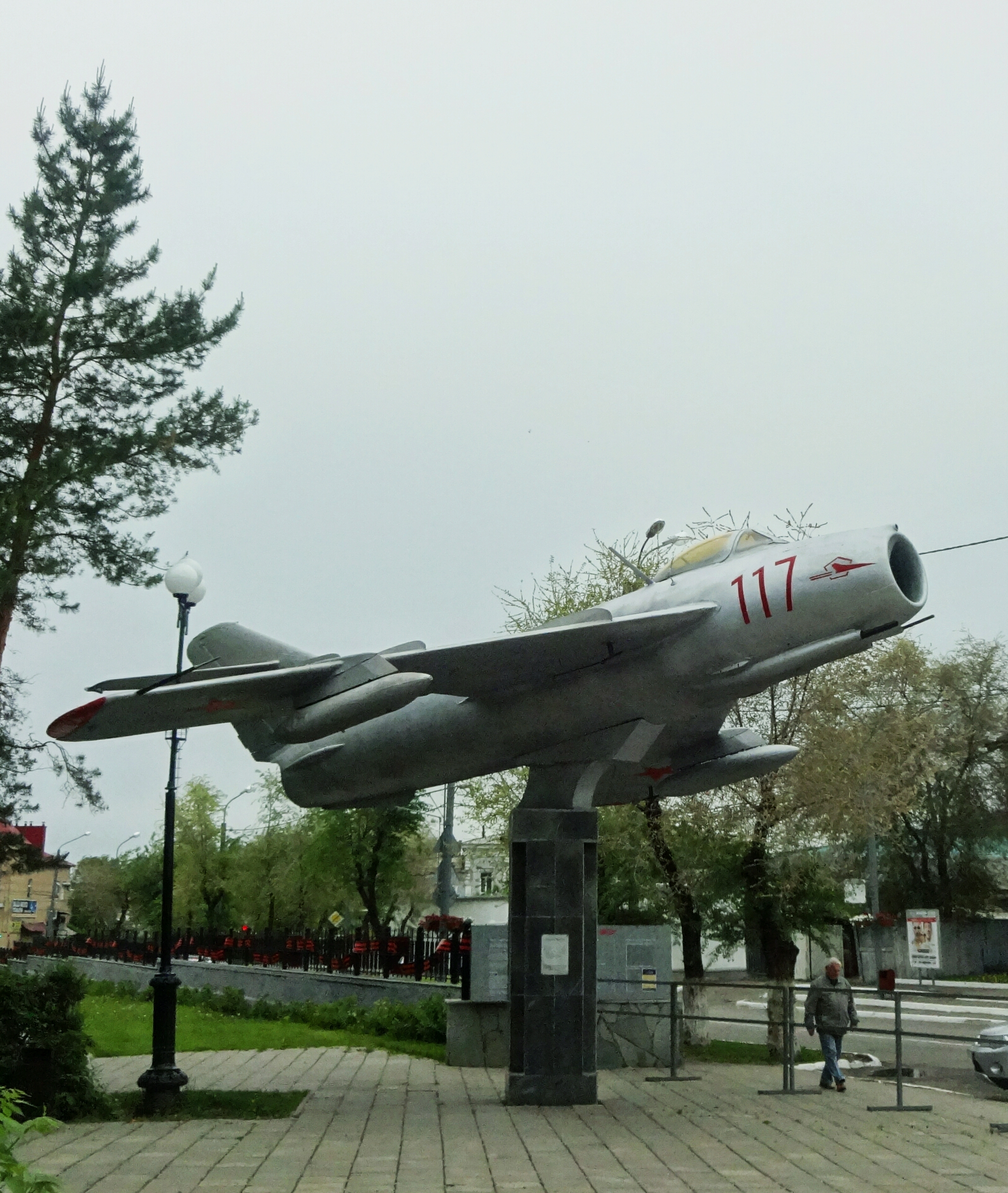
Yuri Gagarin's aeroplane in front of the museum building

After the shutdown of the theological seminary in May 1918, the building was given to the Red Army. During the Civil War in 1919, it served as the headquarters of the 28th Ural Regiment. From either October 1927 (according to some sources) or May 1928 (according to others), the former theological seminary housed the Serpukhov Higher Military Aviation School of Air Combat (later known as Orenburg Higher Military Aviation School for Pilots), which was transferred to Orenburg from Serpukhov. On 18 March 1929, the People's Commissar for Education of the RSFSR, Anatoly Lunacharsky, spoke at the military school of aviators. The building where the Commissar spoke and where the headquarters of the 28th regiment used to be located is now listed as a cultural heritage monument of regional significance. It was an error in the documents that led to the building being listed as the house at 11 Chelyuskintsev Street.

The Orenburg Higher Military Aviation School of Pilots established a room of military glory in 1960 or 1961, following an order from the Minister of Defence of the USSR to create such rooms and museums at military units. By the mid-1960s, the room had evolved into a complete Museum of the History of the School. As of 1971, the museum had three exposition halls. The museum's reconstruction began in 1986 and ended with the opening of the renewed exposition on 10 August 1991.

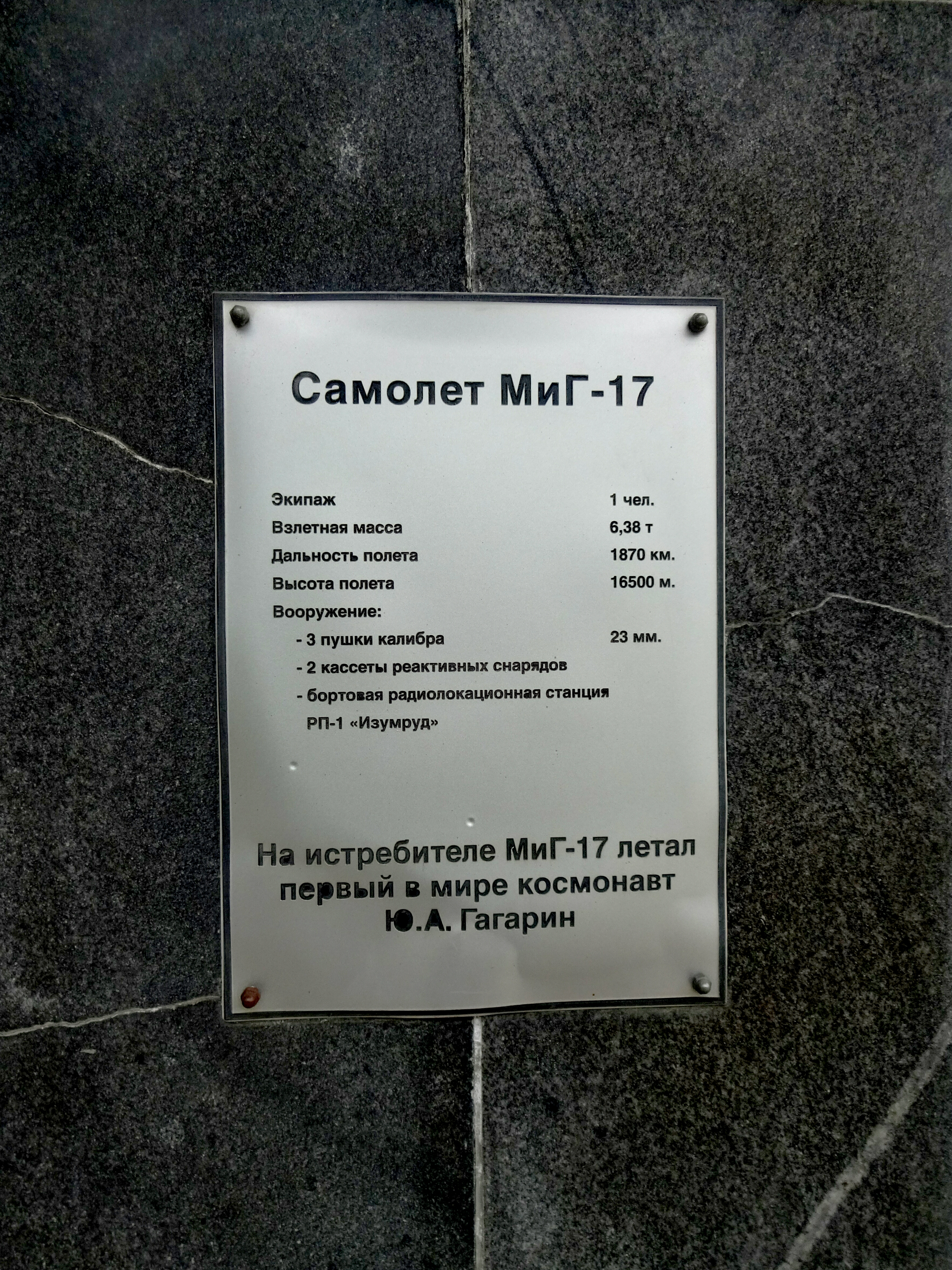
The plaque on the pedestal of the aeroplane monument

Following the school's shutdown in 1993, the museum operated independently for a considerable period. The building was initially occupied by a military transport division, and since 1995, it has been utilized by a boarding school that provides initial flight training (I.I. Neplyuev Orenburg Cadet Boarding School). Additionally, since 2007, a portion of the building has been occupied by the revived Orenburg Theological Seminary. On 1 November 2007, the Museum of Cosmonautics became a branch of the Museum of Orenburg History, following the decision of the head of the city of Orenburg dated 22 June of the same year. The building located at Chelyuskintsev, 17 has been designated as a cultural heritage monument of regional significance since 2006, according to the decree of the Governor of the Orenburg region.

The museum is currently located in a building that was formerly a religious object. It was supposed to be returned to the Russian Orthodox Church by 2016. There have been discussions since 2011 about the possibility of moving the museum to another building that once belonged to the Orenburg Higher Military Aviation School for Pilots at 1 Sovetskaya Street. Yuri Gagarin studied at this school as a cadet, as confirmed by a memorial plaque on the facade of the house at Sovetskaya Street, 1. The prospects of relocation are uncertain due to the unsatisfactory technical condition of the new building and ownership issues.

The museum exposition is dedicated to three stages of the history of the Orenburg Aviation School. The first stage covers the formation of the flying school during the 1920s and 1930s, as well as the life and activities of Valery Chkalov, a graduate of the school who studied there even before it was transferred to Orenburg. The second stage covers the Great Patriotic War and the heroic exploits of Ivan Polbin, after whom the school was

named from 1967 to 1993, as well as Mikhail Devyataev and other graduate heroes. Among the exhibits is a symbolic key to the city of Berlin and earth from Stalingrad.

The third hall of the Cosmonautics Museum showcases the history of space exploration, including Yuri Gagarin, the most famous graduate of the school. On display is his training spacesuit, which he used to prepare for a possible flight on the 'Soyuz 1' in 1966–1967. The exhibit also includes his oxygen mask, helmet, and overalls jacket, which he donated to the museum during his visit to the school on 13 October 1962. The exhibition includes a copy of the collective photo of the graduates of 1957, which includes Gagarin, as well as a certificate assigning Gagarin's name to an asteroid. Additionally, the exposition features information on other cosmonauts who studied at the Orenburg Aviation School, such as Yury V. Lonchakov, Valentin Lebedev, and Alexander Viktorenko.

The museum building features a monument in front of it, which is a MiG-17 fighter jet. The plaque on the pedestal identifies it as the same type of aircraft that Yuri Gagarin flew as a cadet, although some sources mistakenly refer to it as a MiG-15 or MiG-15bis. According to some sources, the monument was erected in 1963 near the college building on Sovetskaya Street, 1. It was later moved to its current location after being taken under protection by the Council of Ministers of the RSFSR in 1974. Today, it holds the status of a monument of federal significance. In front of the building stands a bust of Ivan Polbin, while behind it there is a memorial to the school's hero graduates with name steles, reconstructed in 2007. Additionally, a memorial plaque to Yuri Gagarin is located on the building.

=== Orenburg Museum of Defenders of the Fatherland named after General M.G. Chernyaev ===
The Orenburg Museum of Defenders of the Fatherland, located at 92 Tsvillinga Street, is a military museum with a civic and patriotic focus. Its purpose is to preserve the memory of the combat history of the Imperial Russian Army and the Soviet Army. The museum is named after Lieutenant General Mikhail Chernyaev.

External image
- "Orenburg Museum of Defenders of the Fatherland named after General M.G. Chernyaev".

The museum opened on 7 May 2010, the 65th anniversary of the victory in the Great Patriotic War. It is housed in a building constructed in 1948 by German and Japanese prisoners of war. In 2014, it became a branch of the Museum of Orenburg History.

The exhibition is located in a single hall and contains several hundred exhibits on the military history of Russia from the 19th to the 21st centuries. The main focus is on the Great Patriotic War. In 2015, to celebrate the museum's fifth anniversary and the 70th anniversary of the Victory, a diorama titled Berlin. 1945. May was unveiled. It was created by Orenburg stand modellers. The museum hosts scientific and practical conferences, student classes, commemorative and educational events, and oversees the activities of clubs and electives.

== Bibliography ==
Добрейцина, Л. Е.; Санникова, Т. О. (2013). Исторические города Урала. Часть 2. Исторические города Южного Урала: Республика Башкортостан, Челябинская и Оренбургская области. Учебное пособие. Ekaterinburg: Издательство Уральского федерального университета. ISBN 978-5-7996-0888-0.
