= Nikolay Antoshkin =

Russian Air Force colonel general and statesman (1942–2021)

Nikolay Timofeyevich Antoshkin
- Николай Тимофеевич Антошкин
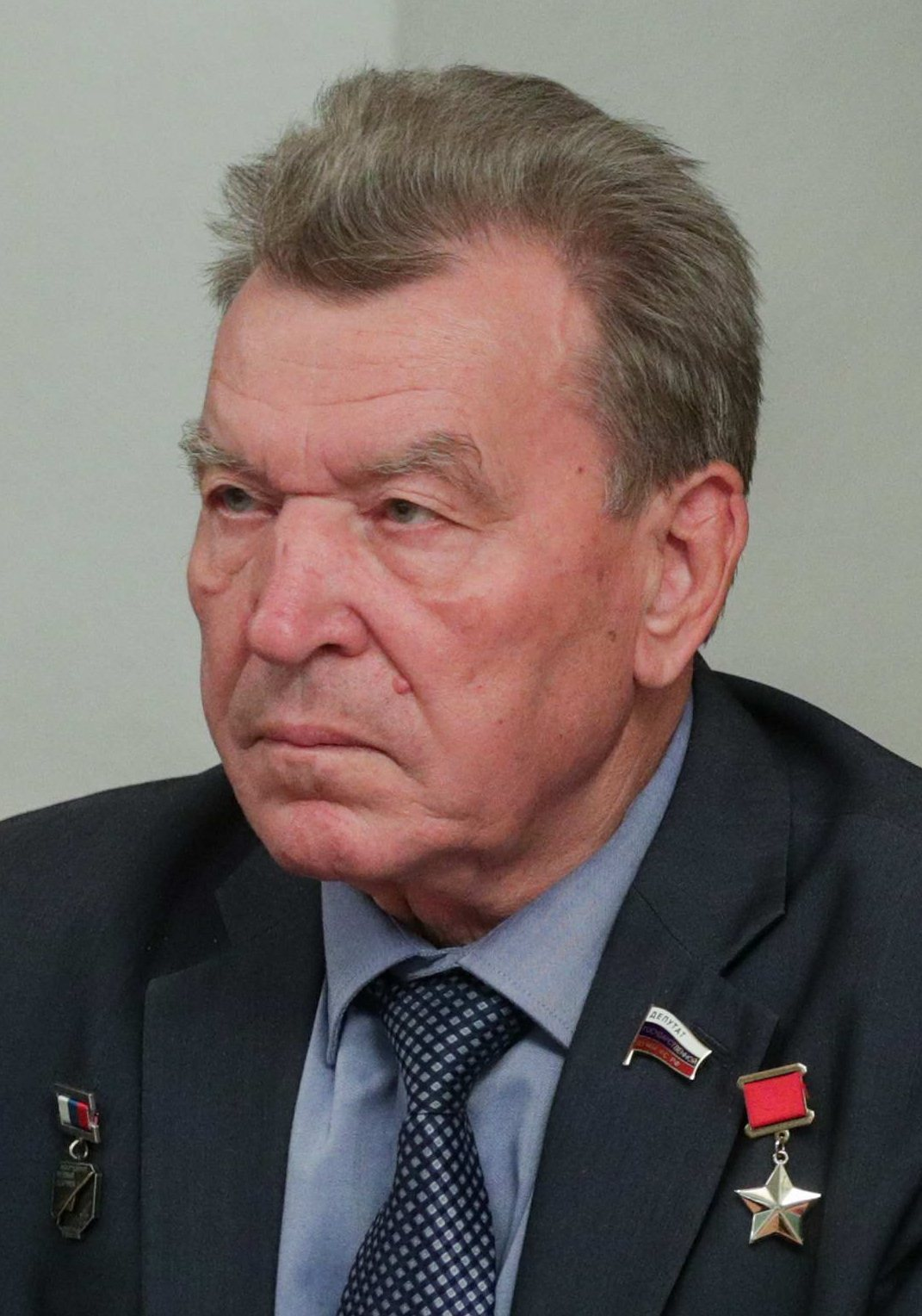

Member of the State Duma
- In office 26 November 2014 – 17 January 2021

Personal details
- Born: 19 December 1942 Kuzminovka, Fyodorovsky District, Bashkir ASSR, Soviet Union
- Died: 17 January 2021 (aged 78) Moscow, Russia
- Party: United Russia
- Awards: Hero of the Soviet Union

Military service
- Allegiance: Soviet Union (1961–91); Russia (1992–98)
- Branch/service: Soviet Air Force (1961–91); Russian Air Force (1992–98)
- Years of service: 1961–98
- Rank: Colonel general
- Commands: Air Force of the Moscow Military District; Frontal Aviation of the Russian Air Force

Nikolay Timofeyevich Antoshkin (Russian: Николай Тимофеевич Антошкин; 19 December 1942 – 17 January 2021) was a Mokshan Russian Air Force colonel general, Hero of the Soviet Union and politician. Born in 1942 in Bashkortostan, Antoshkin was drafted into the Soviet Army in August 1961. After graduating from military aviation school, he served with reconnaissance aviation units. He became commander of the Air Force of the 20th Guards Army in May 1980. After graduation from the Military Academy of the General Staff, Antoshkin became commander of the Air Force and deputy commander of the Central Group of Forces.

In March 1985, he became chief of staff of the Air Forces of the Kyiv Military District. In this role, he supervised the initial Chernobyl helicopter cleanup operations. For his actions, Antoshkin was awarded the title Hero of the Soviet Union. He later commanded the Air Forces of the Central Asian Military District and Moscow Military District. Between 1993 and 1997 Antoshkin led Russian Air Force Frontal Aviation. In 1997 he became head of Air Force combat training and retired a year later. Antoshkin was elected a deputy of the State Duma in 2014. He was affiliated with United Russia.

== Early life ==
Antoshkin was born on 19 December 1942 in the village of Kuzminovka in the Bashkir Autonomous Soviet Socialist Republic. Between 1950 and 1951 he lived in the village of Kholmogorovka. In 1951, he moved to Kumertau. Antoshkin graduated from tenth grade in 1960. He worked as a worker in the repair and construction workshop and physical education instructor at the Kumertau Power Plant between 1960 and 1961.

== Military service ==
Antoshkin was drafted into the Soviet Armed Forces in August 1961. He was sent to the Orenburg Higher Military Aviation School for Pilots, graduating in 1965. Antoshkin was promoted to lieutenant on 29 October 1965. He became a pilot, squadron chief of staff and flight leader in a separate reconnaissance aviation regiment in the Belorussian Military District. He was promoted to senior lieutenant on 6 December 1967. Between 1969 and 1970 he was a flight commander in a separate reconnaissance aviation regiment in the Far Eastern Military District. He received the rank of captain on 30 December 1969. Antoshkin graduated from the Gagarin Air Force Academy in 1973. On 29 June he was promoted to major. He became a squadron commander and deputy commander of a training reconnaissance aviation regiment in the Odessa Military District. Between September 1975 and June 1979 Antoshkin led the 87th Separate Reconnaissance Aviation Regiment in the Turkestan Military District. He was promoted to lieutenant colonel on 19 September 1975. On 22 February 1977, Antoshkin was awarded the Order for Service to the Homeland in the Armed Forces of the USSR 3rd class. During March 1979 the regiment conducted reconnaissance missions over Afghan territory. In June 1979 he was transferred to command the 11th Separate Reconnaissance Aviation Regiment in the Group of Soviet Forces in Germany. On 27 December, Antoshkin was promoted to colonel. He became commander of the Air Force of the 20th Guards Army in May 1980. After graduating from the Military Academy of the General Staff in 1983, Antoshkin was appointed commander of the Air Force of the Central Group of Forces and deputy commander of the group.

In March 1985, Antoshkin became chief of staff of the Air Forces of the Kyiv Military District. On 29 April, he was promoted to general-mayor (one star). Immediately after the Chernobyl disaster, Antoshkin carried out a helicopter flyby of the plant on 26 April 1986. Antoshkin organized, led, and flew with the helicopter group tasked with dropping "tons of sand, lead, and neutron-absorbing boron" onto the crater of the reactor until 5 May, by which time the fire had been contained. For his leadership, he was awarded the title Hero of the Soviet Union and the Order of Lenin on 24 December 1986. In August 1988 he was transferred to become commander of the Air Force of the Central Asian Military District at Almaty. In November 1989 he became commander of the Air Force of the Moscow Military District. He was promoted to lieutenant general on 25 April 1990. On 28 November 1991 he was awarded the Order for Service to the Homeland in the Armed Forces of the USSR 2nd class. From November 1993 to March 1997 Antoshkin led Russian Air Force Frontal aviation. He was promoted to colonel general on 10 June 1994. On 28 August 1995 he received the Order "For Merit to the Fatherland" 4th class. In 1996 he was made an honorary citizen of Kumertau. Between November 1997 and September 1998 he was deputy commander of the Air Force for combat training and head of Air Force combat training. Antoshkin became an honorary citizen of Mordovia around this time. He retired in September 1998.

== Later life ==
Antoshkin lived in Moscow. In 2002, he became chairman of the board of the Club of Heroes of the Soviet Union, Heroes of the Russian Federation and Full Cavaliers of the Order of Glory's Moscow chapter. He was awarded the Russian Federation Government Award in 2012 for "significant contributions to the development of the Russian Air Force". On 19 October 2013, he was awarded the Order "For Merit to the Fatherland" 3rd class. In 2014, he was elected a deputy of the State Duma for regional group N77, which includes the Troitsky Administrative Okrug and Novomoskovsky Administrative Okrug. He was a member of the State Duma Committee on Natural Resources, Environment and Ecology.

== Personal life ==
Antoshkin married Tatiana Sergeyevna. His son Sergey was born in 1967 and his daughter Elena was born in 1975.

== Death ==
Antoshkin died in January 2021, after being treated for COVID-19 during the COVID-19 pandemic in Russia. An official notice from the State Duma reads: "After a serious illness, our comrade, State Duma deputy, Hero of the Soviet Union Nikolay Timofeyevich Antoshkin passed away". He was buried in the Federal Military Memorial Cemetery in Mytishchi on 20 January.

== See also ==
- List of members of the State Duma of Russia who died in office
