= Sarachi =

Sarachi may refer to:

- Chatin Sarachi (1899–1974), Albanian painter
- Hafida Sarachi, who appeared in Series 5, Episode 7, of the British TV programme Dragon's Den
- Sarachi, Russia, a rural locality in Perm Krai, Russia
