= Bikbulatovo =

Bekechevo Бикбулатово
- Village
- Location within Bashkortostan Location within Russia
- Coordinates: 52°43′N 56°45′E
- Country: Russia
- Region: Bashkortostan
- District: Kugarchinsky District
- Time zone: UTC+5:00

Bikbulatovo (Russian: Бикбулатово; Bashkir: Бикбулат, Bikbulat) is a rural locality (a village) and the administrative center of Uralsky Selsoviet in Kugarchinsky District, Bashkortostan, Russia. As of 2010, the population of Bikbulatovo was 497. The village consists of eight streets.

== Geography ==
Bikbulatovo is situated 13 km east of Mrakovo, which serves as the administrative center of the district and can be reached by road. The nearest rural locality is Kuzminovka.
