= Kuzminov =

Kuzminov (Russian: Кузьминов) is a Russian surname that may refer to:

- Yaroslav Kuzminov (born 1957), Russian economist
- Maxim Kuzminov (1995—2024), Russian military defector

== See also ==
- Kuzmin (disambiguation)
- Kuzminovka (disambiguation)
