= Orenburg Regional Museum of Fine Arts =

Art museum in Orenburg, Russia

Coordinates: 51.7603°N 55.1014°E

- Оренбургский областной музей изобразительных искусств
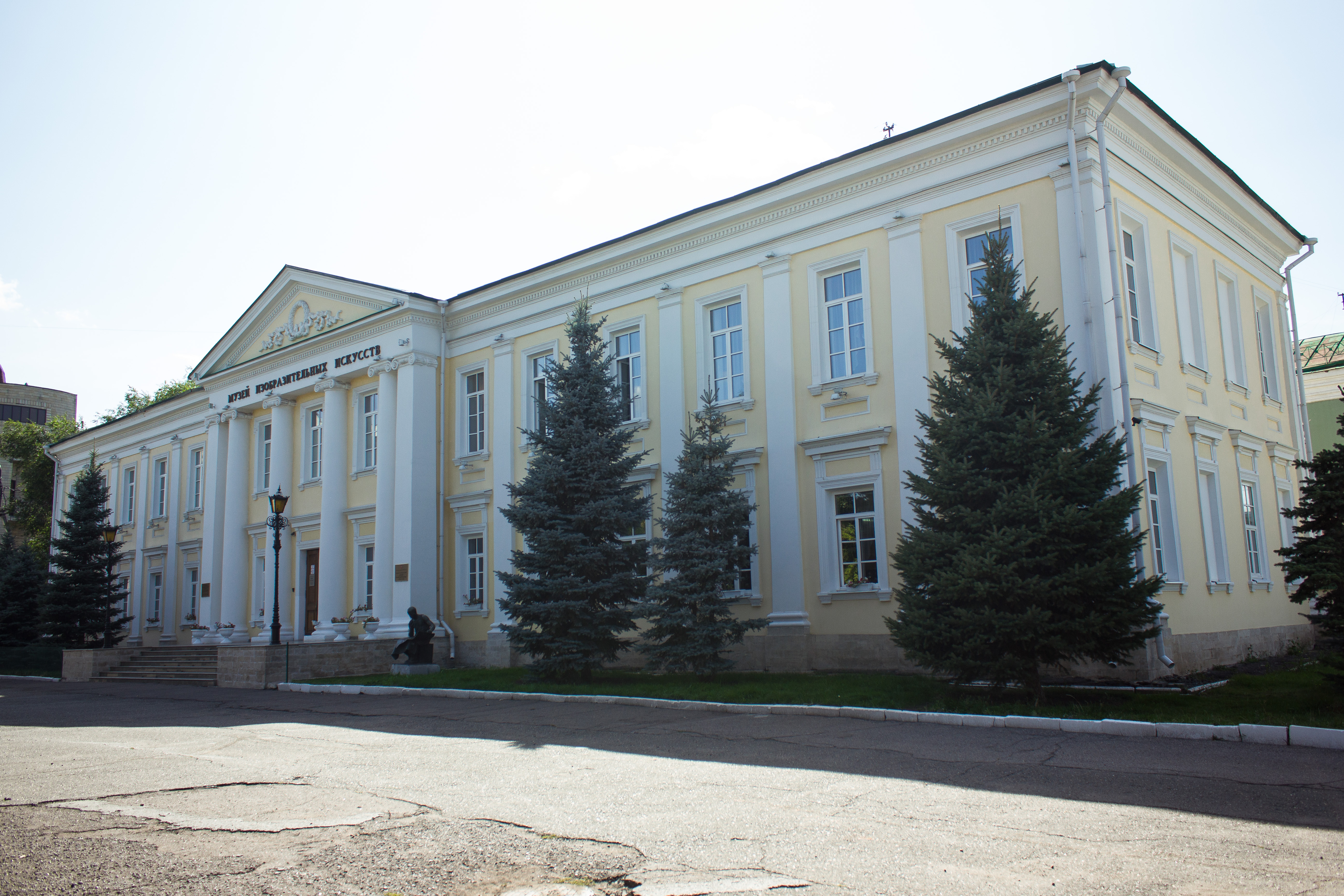
- Established: 1960
- Location: Orenburg, Russia
- Director: Komlev Yuri Eduardovich
- Website: http://www.omizo.ru/

Orenburg Regional Museum of Fine Arts (Russian: Оренбургский областной музей изобразительных искусств) is an art museum located in Orenburg, Russia. It was opened to the public in 1961. The gallery houses a collection of Soviet, Russian, and Western European art, and was initially predicated on a collection of Lukian Popov works.

== History ==
Orenburg Regional Museum of Fine Arts was founded in 1960, initiated by art historian Sergey Andreevich Varlamov. The museum was opened in 1961 in a building built in 1814 in the style of Russian classicism.

The collection was based on the collection of academician of the Imperial Academy of Arts Lukian Vasilyevich Popov.

== Awards ==
March 5, 2021 – Gratitude of the President of the Russian Federation (for services to the development of national culture and art, many years of productive activity)
