= Kuzminka, Perm Krai =

Kuzminka Кузьминка
- Village
- Location within Perm Krai Location within Russia
- Coordinates: 58°11′N 54°46′E
- Country: Russia
- Region: Perm Krai
- District: Vereshchaginsky District
- Time zone: UTC+5:00

Kuzminka (Russian: Кузьминка) is a rural locality (a village) in Vereshchaginsky District, Perm Krai, Russia. The population was 7 as of 2010.

== Geography ==
Kuzminka is located 22 km northeast of Vereshchagino, the district's administrative centre, by road. Sarachi is the nearest rural locality.
