= Kuzminka, Volgograd Oblast =

Kuzminka Кузьминка
- Settlement
- Location within Volgograd Oblast Location within Russia
- Coordinates: 50°17′N 41°37′E
- Country: Russia
- Region: Volgograd Oblast
- District: Nekhayevsky District
- Time zone: UTC+4:00

Kuzminka (Russian: Кузьминка) is a rural locality (a settlement) in Dinamovskoye Rural Settlement, Nekhayevsky District, Volgograd Oblast, Russia. The population was 3 as of 2010.

== Geography ==
Kuzminka is located on Kalach Upland, 26 km southwest of Nekhayevskaya (the district's administrative centre) by road. Dinamo is the nearest rural locality.
