= Kuzmin =

Kuzmin may refer to:

- Kuzmin (Sremska Mitrovica), a village in Serbia
- Kuzmyn, a village in Ukraine
- Kuźmina, a village in Poland
- Kuzmin (surname)
