= Kuzminovka, Davlekanovsky District, Republic of Bashkortostan =

Kuzminovka Кузьминовка
- Village
- Location within Bashkortostan Location within Russia
- Coordinates: 54°07′N 55°30′E
- Country: Russia
- Region: Bashkortostan
- District: Davlekanovsky District
- Time zone: UTC+5:00

Kuzminovka (Russian: Кузьминовка) is a rural locality (a village) in Kadyrgulovsky Selsoviet, Davlekanovsky District, Bashkortostan, Russia. The population was 41 as of 2010. There is 1 street.

== Geography ==
Kuzminovka is located 35 km east of Davlekanovo (the district's administrative centre) by road. Khusainovo is the nearest rural locality.
