= Kuzminka, Altai Krai =

Kuzminka Кузьминка
- Selo
- Location within Altai Krai Location within Russia
- Coordinates: 51°18′N 81°56′E
- Country: Russia
- Region: Altai Krai
- District: Zmeinogorsky District
- Time zone: UTC+7:00

Kuzminka (Russian: Кузьминка) is a rural locality (a selo) and the administrative center of Kuzminsky Selsoviet, Zmeinogorsky District, Altai Krai, Russia. The population was 644 as of 2013. There are 15 streets.

== Geography ==
Kuzminka is located 29 km northwest of Zmeinogorsk (the district's administrative centre) by road. Nikolsk is the nearest rural locality.
