= Kuzminka, Kaduysky District, Vologda Oblast =

Kuzminka Кузьминка
- Village
- Location within Vologda Oblast Location within Russia
- Coordinates: 59°23′N 36°41′E
- Country: Russia
- Region: Vologda Oblast
- District: Kaduysky District
- Time zone: UTC+3:00

Kuzminka (Russian: Кузьминка) is a rural locality (a village) in Semizerye Rural Settlement, Kaduysky District, Vologda Oblast, Russia. The population was 17 as of 2010.

== Geography ==
Kuzminka is located 42 km northwest of Kaduy (the district's administrative centre) by road. Dilskiye is the nearest rural locality.
