= Kuzminka, Buzdyaksky District, Republic of Bashkortostan =

Kuzminka Кузьминка
- Village
- Location within Bashkortostan Location within Russia
- Coordinates: 54°24′N 54°29′E
- Country: Russia
- Region: Bashkortostan
- District: Buzdyaksky District
- Time zone: UTC+5:00

Kuzminka (Russian: Кузьминка) is a rural locality (a village) in Kanly-Turkeyevsky Selsoviet, Buzdyaksky District, Bashkortostan, Russia. The population was 44 as of 2010. There is only 1 street.

== Geography ==
Kuzminka is located 24 km south of Buzdyak (the district's administrative centre) by road. Annovka is the nearest rural locality.
