= Kuzminovka, Aurgazinsky District, Republic of Bashkortostan =

Kuzminovka Кузьминовка
- Village
- Location within Bashkortostan Location within Russia
- Coordinates: 53°47′N 55°34′E
- Country: Russia
- Region: Bashkortostan
- District: Aurgazinsky District
- Time zone: UTC+5:00

Kuzminovka (Russian: Кузьминовка) is a rural locality (a village) in Semyonkinsky Selsoviet, Aurgazinsky District, Bashkortostan, Russia. The population was 50 as of 2010. There is 1 street.

== Geography ==
Kuzminovka is located 37 km southwest of Tolbazy (the district's administrative centre) by road. Nizhny Begenyash is the nearest rural locality.
