= Orenburg Higher Military Aviation School for Pilots =

I. S. Polbin Orenburg Red Banner Higher Military Aviation School for Pilots
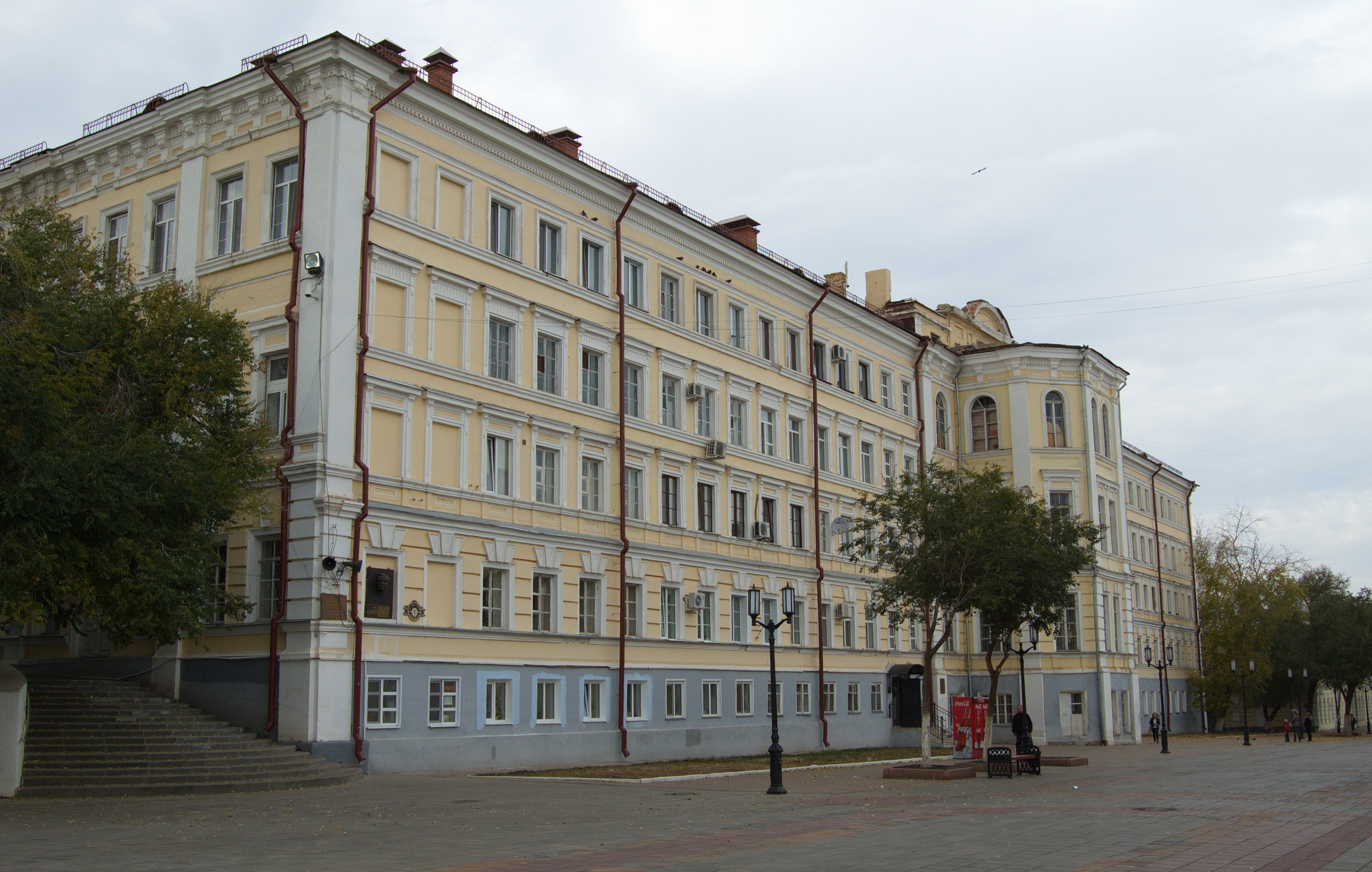
- School building in Orenburg
- Active: 1921–1993
- Country: Soviet Union
- Branch: Soviet Air Force
- Type: Flight training school
- Garrison/HQ: Orenburg (from 1927)
- Decorations: Order of the Red Banner
- Honorific: named for I. S. Polbin

The I. S. Polbin Orenburg Red Banner Higher Military Aviation School for Pilots (Russian: Оренбургское высшее военное авиационное Краснознаменное училище лётчиков имени И. С. Полбина, OVVAKUL) was a flight training school of the Soviet Air Force, located in the city of Orenburg. One of the oldest flight schools in the air force, the school was established in Moscow in 1921, and moved to Orenburg in 1927. The school was disbanded in 1993.

== History ==
The Orenburg Higher Military Aviation School for Pilots began as the Moscow School for Air Combat and Bombing, which began forming in accordance with a decree dated 10 August 1921. The school was moved to the nearby city of Serpukhov on 9 August 1922. In October 1923 the Serpukhov school was renamed the Higher Military Aviation School for Air Gunnery and Bombing. In 1923 V. I. Chekalov was appointed head of the school. Three departments were created in the school: training, flying, and maintenance. Two aviation detachments, one fighter and one reconnaissance, became part of the school. The school, led by Fyodor Astakhov, relocated to Orenburg in October 1927, and on 1 October 1928 was merged with the Orenburg Military School for Air Combat and the Leningrad Higher School for Observers. The combined school was designated as the K. E. Voroshilov 3rd Military School for Pilots and Observers. By 1930, the school had trained 459 pilots, 2,078 observers, twenty aeronauts, 53 instructors, 956 air gunners, and more than 100 instructor pilots, and a large group of junior aviation specialists.

In May 1938 the school was renamed the K. E. Voroshilov Orenburg Military Aviation School for Pilots, and in February 1939 was divided into two separate schools: the K. E. Voroshilov 1st Chkalov Military Aviation School for Pilots (VAUL) (on Sovetskaya street) and the 2nd Chkalov Military Aviation School for Navigators (on Chelyuskintsev street) in order to improve the training conditions of pilots and navigators.

In the late 1940s training at the school was carried out on the Ilyushin Il-10 ground attack aircraft, and in the first half of the 1950s Ilyushin Il-28 and Mikoyan-Gurevich MiG-15 jet aircraft arrived at the school. In 1960, the school received the status of a higher training institution: the personnel and equipment of the Orenburg School for Navigators and Kirovobad School for Pilots (earlier relocated to Orsk) were merged into it. On 23 December 1963, at the initiative of the Orenburg Oblast Komsomol Committee and the flight school, the first school for young kosmonauts in the Soviet Union was created. The first graduation of engineer pilots for the air force graduated in 1963, and at the same time the school shifted to training naval aviation pilots and aircrew. The school received the name of Ivan Polbin as an honorific in May 1967.

The school included three training aviation regiments during the postwar period:

- 814th Training Aviation Regiment and security units at Orenburg-2 and field airfield Orenburg-3, later Terensay, equipped with the Aero L-29 Delfín
- 904th Training Aviation Regiment and security units at Chebenki and field airfield Sol-Iletsk, equipped with the Ilyushin Il-28 until 1980, then the L-29
- 750th Training Aviation Regiment and security units at Orsk-Pervomaysky and field airfield Ashchebuyak, then Terensay, equipped with the Il-28 until 1982 (earlier flew the MiG-15), then the Tu-134UBL

Training ranges were at Orlovsky and Akzharsky.

More than 32,000 pilots, navigators and ground aviation specialists graduated from the school during its existence. Among them were more than 150 generals, 342 Heroes of the Soviet Union, eleven twice Heroes of the Soviet Union, twelve Heroes of Russia, and four cosmonauts. Valery Chkalov received training at the school between 1923 and 1924, and Yuri Gagarin graduated from the school in 1957.

The school was disbanded on 12 February 1993. The Orenburg Cadet Corps, which conducts basic training in flying, aerospace engineering, anti-aircraft missile, and firefighting, took over its building. The 18th Guards Military Transport Aviation Division was also based on the grounds of the former school, with the aircraft of the 127th Military Transport Aviation Regiment based at Orenburg-2. The uninhabitable premises of the former school were transferred to jurisdiction of the Ministry of Defense in 2003 and now houses the Museum of Cosmonauts, under the Museum of Orenburg History, the Orenburg Cadet Boarding School, and the Orenburg Theological Seminary. The building was fully transferred to the seminary in 2022.

== Heads of the school ==
- Major General of Aviation Vasily Makarov (1949–1959)
- Lieutenant General of Aviation Ivan Kulichev (1961–1967)
- Major General of Aviation Aleksey Medvedev (1967–1970)
- Major General of Aviation Marat Vasilyev (1970–1974)
- Major General of Aviation Yury Simakhin (1974–1980)
- Major General of Aviation Igor Krutov (1980–1982)
- Major General of Aviation Nikolay Kuchin (1982–1985)
- Major General of Aviation Vladimir Milyukov (1985–1993)
