= Kuzminovka, Sterlitamaksky District, Republic of Bashkortostan =

Kuzminovka Кузьминовка
- Village
- Location within Bashkortostan Location within Russia
- Coordinates: 53°42′N 55°25′E
- Country: Russia
- Region: Bashkortostan
- District: Sterlitamaksky District
- Time zone: UTC+5:00

Kuzminovka (Russian: Кузьминовка) is a rural locality (a village) in Pervomaysky Selsoviet, Sterlitamaksky District, Bashkortostan, Russia. The population was 251 as of 2010. There is 1 street.

== Geography ==
Kuzminovka is located 40 km northwest of Sterlitamak (the district's administrative centre) by road. Churtan is the nearest rural locality.
