= Kuzminka, Chishminsky District, Republic of Bashkortostan =

Kuzminka Кузьминка
- Village
- Location within Bashkortostan Location within Russia
- Coordinates: 54°22′N 55°12′E
- Country: Russia
- Region: Bashkortostan
- District: Chishminsky District
- Time zone: UTC+5:00

Kuzminka (Russian: Кузьминка) is a rural locality (a village) in Shingak-Kulsky Selsoviet, Chishminsky District, Bashkortostan, Russia. The village has 2 streets and, as of 2010, a population of 108.

== Geography ==
Kuzminka is located 30 km southwest of Chishmy, the district's administrative centre. Shingak-Kul is the nearest rural locality.
