= Sarachi (rural locality) =

Sarachi Сарачи
- Village
- Location within Perm Krai Location within Russia
- Coordinates: 58°10′N 54°47′E
- Country: Russia
- Region: Perm Krai
- District: Vereshchaginsky District
- Time zone: UTC+5:00

Sarachi (Russian: Сарачи) is a rural locality (a village) in Vereshchaginsky District, Perm Krai, Russia. The population was 11 as of 2010.

== Geography ==
Sarachi is located 24 km northeast of Vereshchagino (the district's administrative centre) by road. Kuzminka is the nearest rural locality.
