= Lukian Popov =

Russian painter

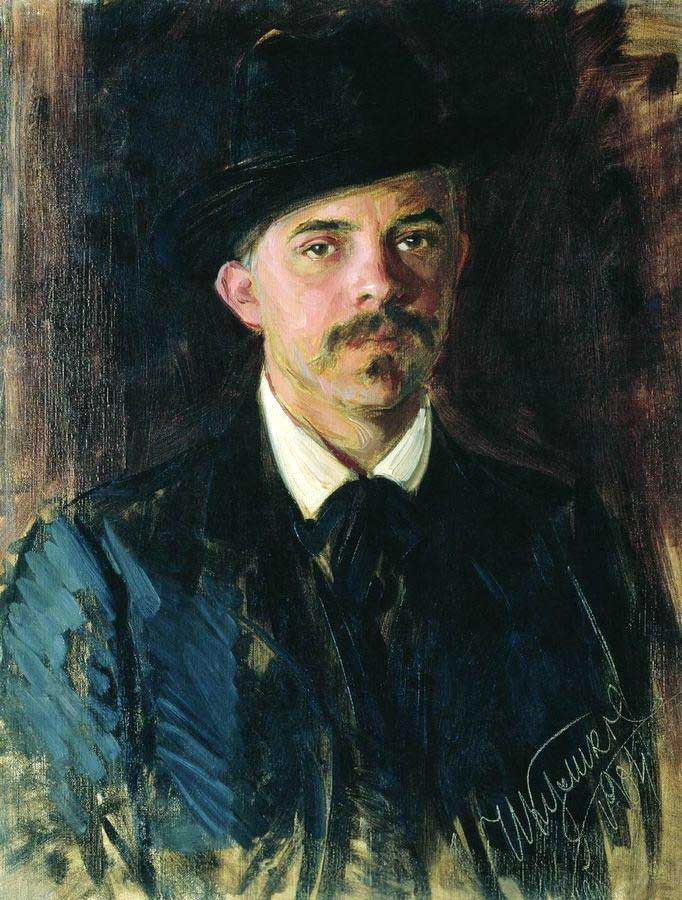
- Lukian Popov (c.1900); portrait by Ivan Kulikov
- Born: October 8, 1873; Orenburgsky Uyezd, Orenburg Governorate
- Died: May 7, 1914 (aged 40); Orenburg
- Education: Member Academy of Arts (1912)
- Alma mater: Higher Art School (1902)
- Known for: Painting
- Style: Realism
- Movement: Peredvizhniki

Lukian Vasilievich Popov (Russian: Лукиан Васильевич Попов; 20 October 1873 - 20 May 1914) was a genre painter in the Realistic style; associated with the Peredvizhniki. He was from the Russian Empire.

== Biography ==
He was born to a poor peasant family. In 1876, after the establishment of universal military service, his father was called up and the family moved to Orenburg, where he attended school, graduating from the Neplyuyev Military Academy in 1891.

His first artistic studies were at the Drawing School of the Imperial Society for the Encouragement of the Arts. From 1896 to 1902, he studied at the Imperial Academy of Arts with Vladimir Makovsky. Upon graduating, he qualified for a stipend that enabled him to visit Germany and France.

After his return, he went back to Orenburg, where he remained until his death, although he travelled throughout the region, sketching village life. In 1903, he became a member of the Peredvizhniki. Six years later, he joined the Kuindzhi Art Society. In 1912, on the recommendation of Ilya Repin, the Academy awarded him the title of "Academician".

After the Revolution of 1905, many of his paintings were given innocuous names by the censors. "Agitator in the Village" became "By Sunset", for example. Then, in 1914, the governing board of the Peredvizhniki would not allow him to participate because his painting, "The Dying Child", was not in the spirit of the "celebratory tone" of the exhibition. The painting was based on Popov's own son, who had been born blind and died after an operation that might have restored his sight. He was later offered a place to exhibit separately.

Popov died shortly after these events, but none of the available sources indicate that his death was by anything other than natural causes.

== Selected paintings ==
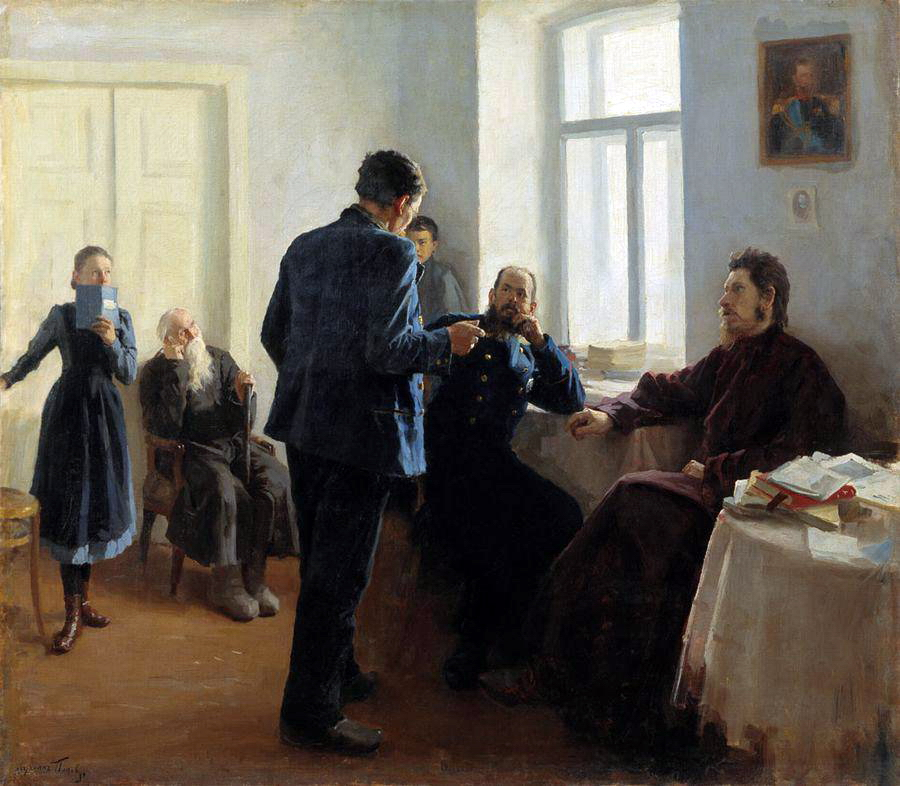
Where is the truth? (Truth Seekers) (1903)

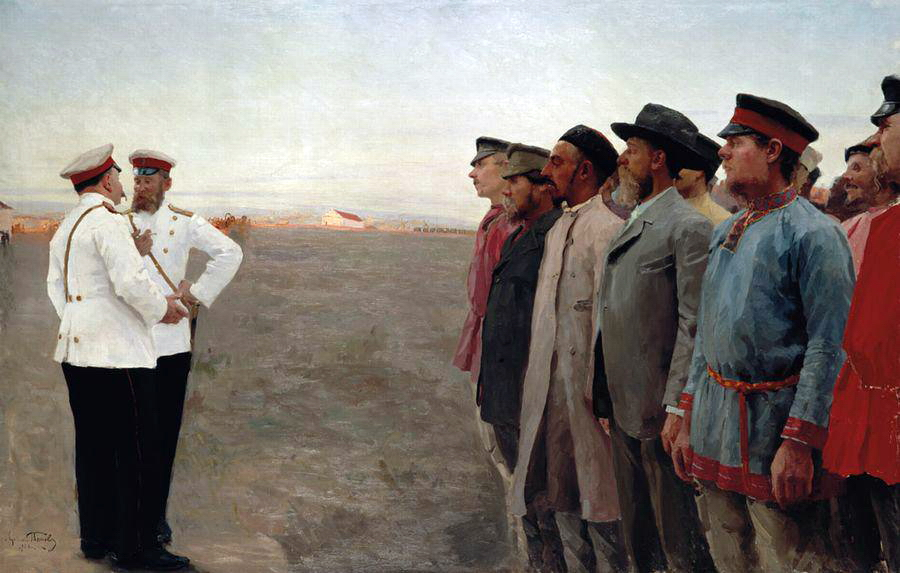
Mobilized (1904)

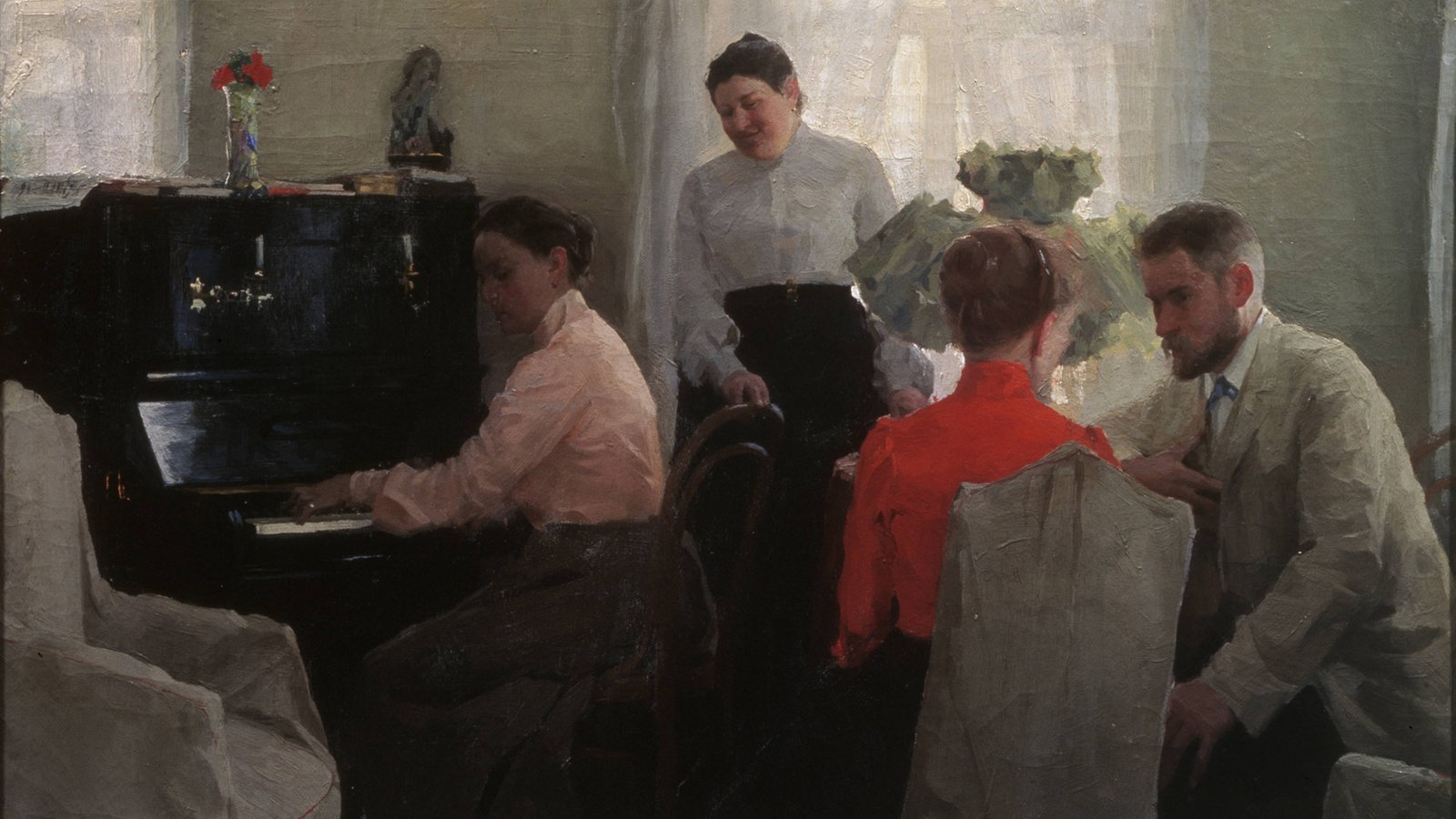
The groom (1904)

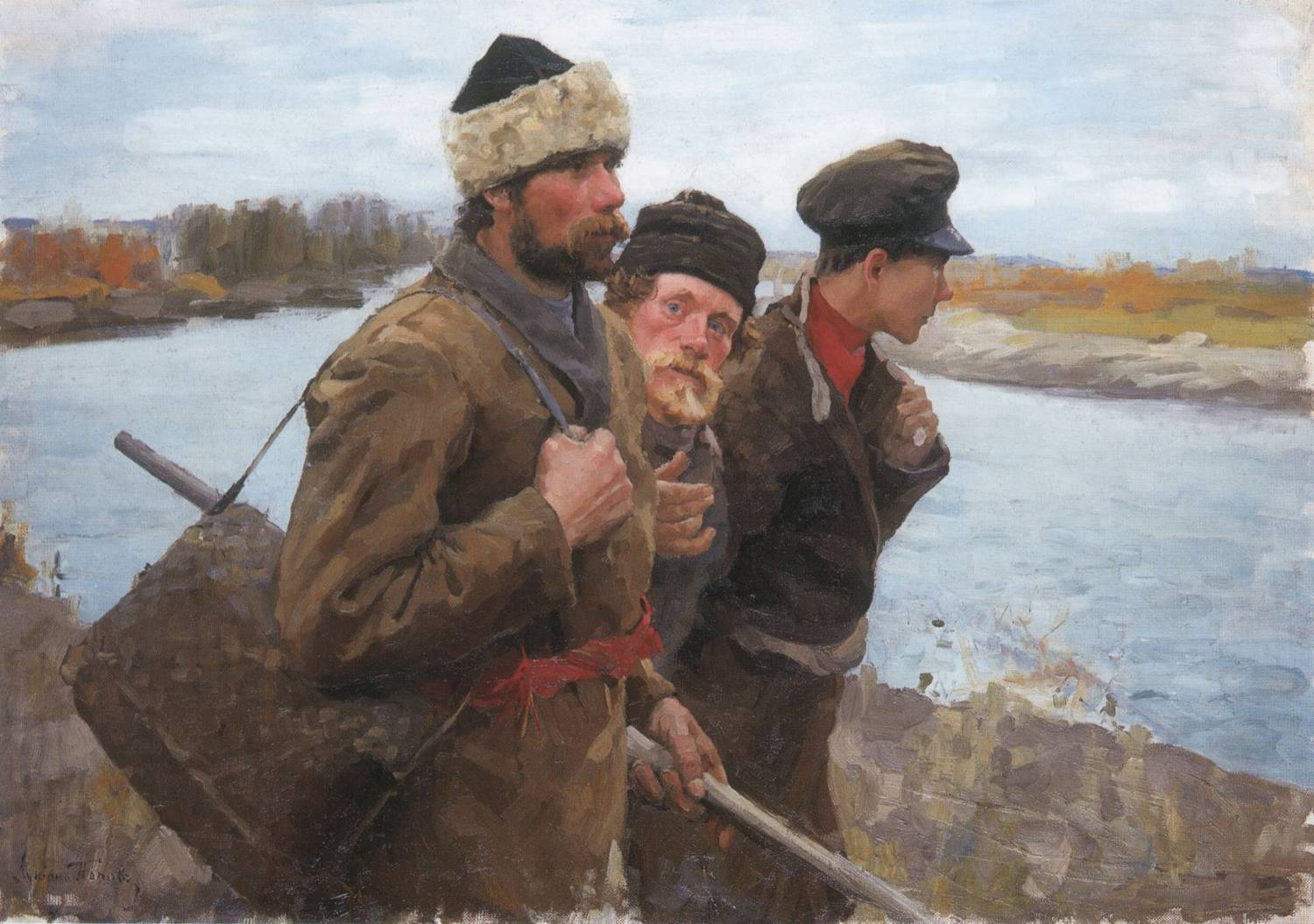
Walking to New Places (1904)

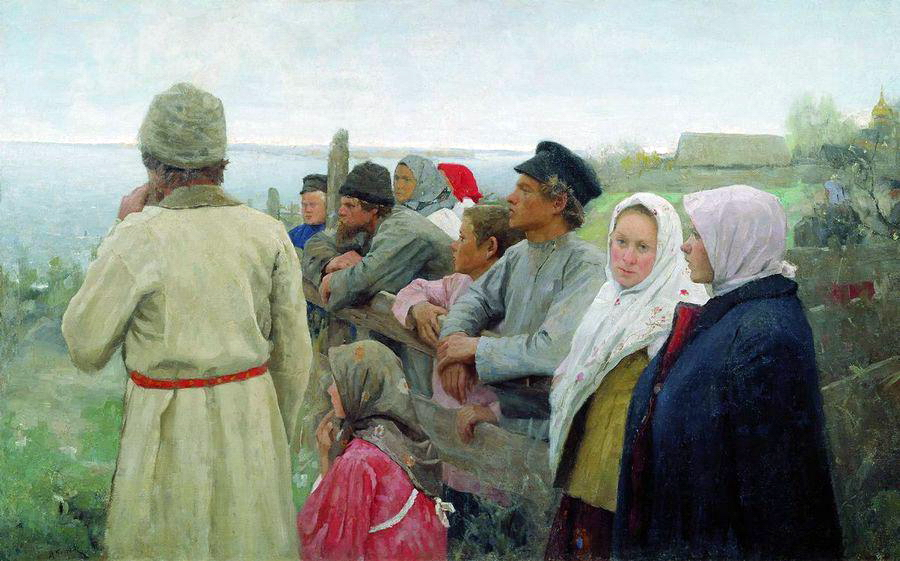
Meadows flooded (1908)

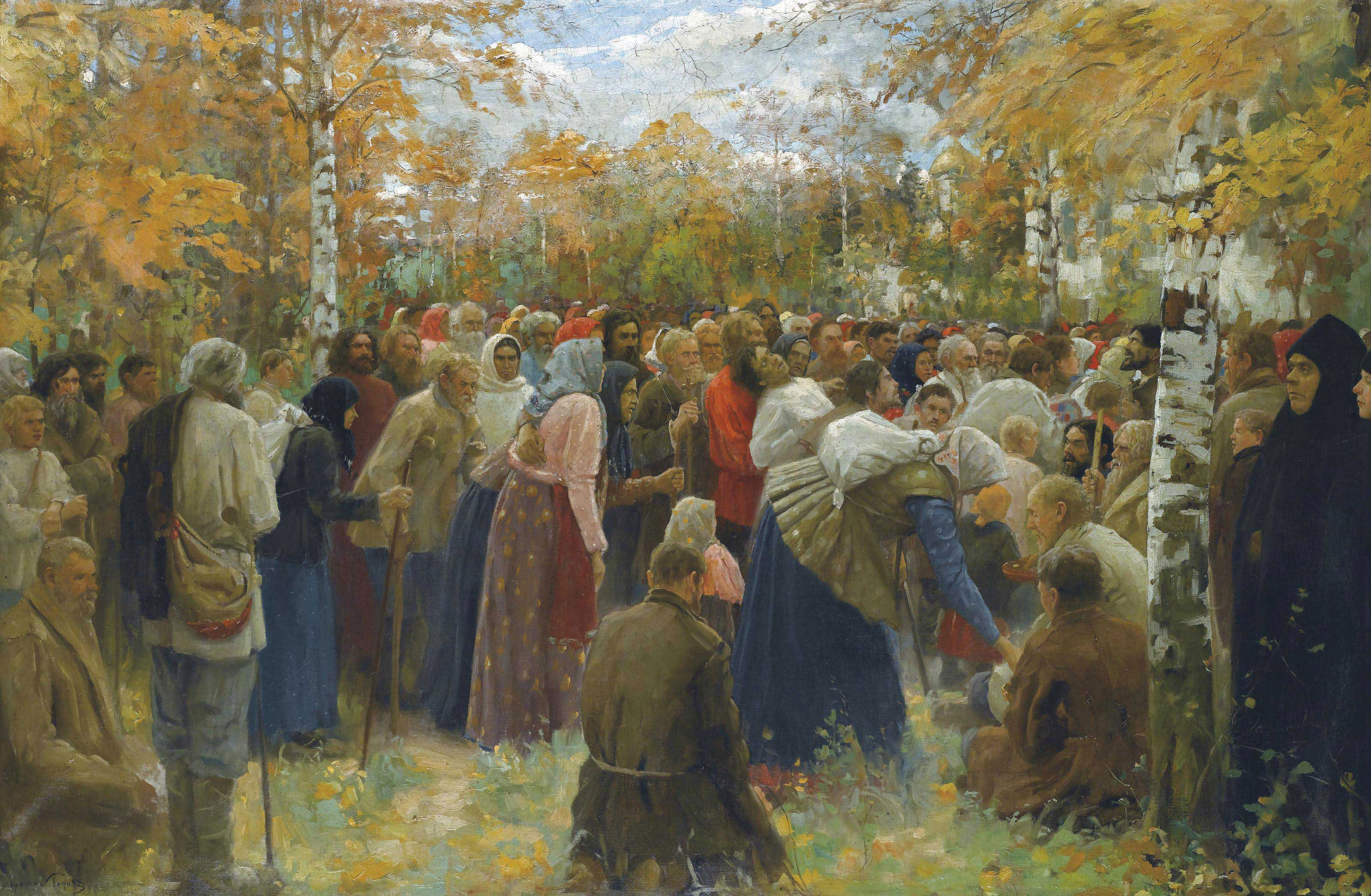
To holy places (1911)

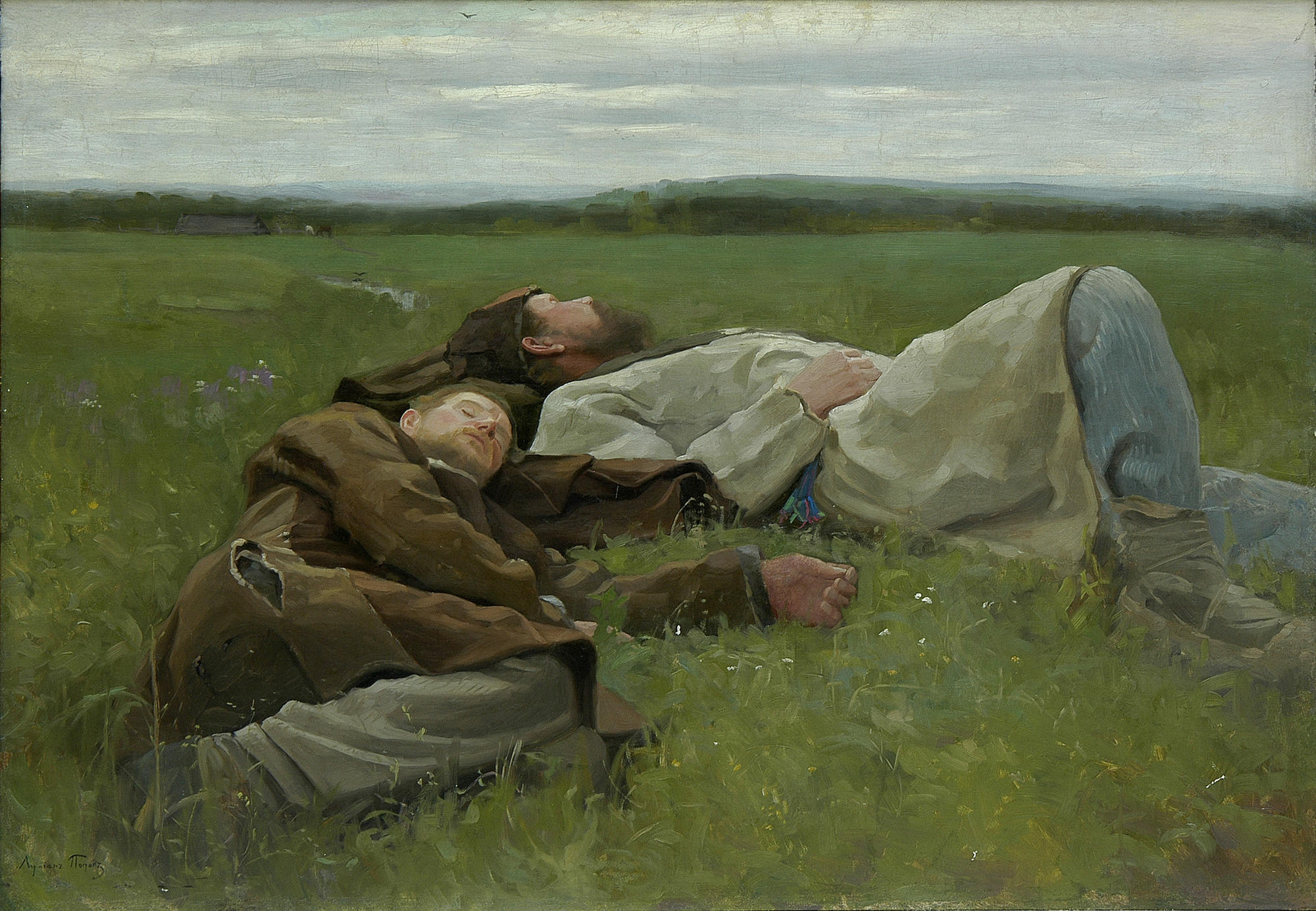
Deep Sleep (1912)

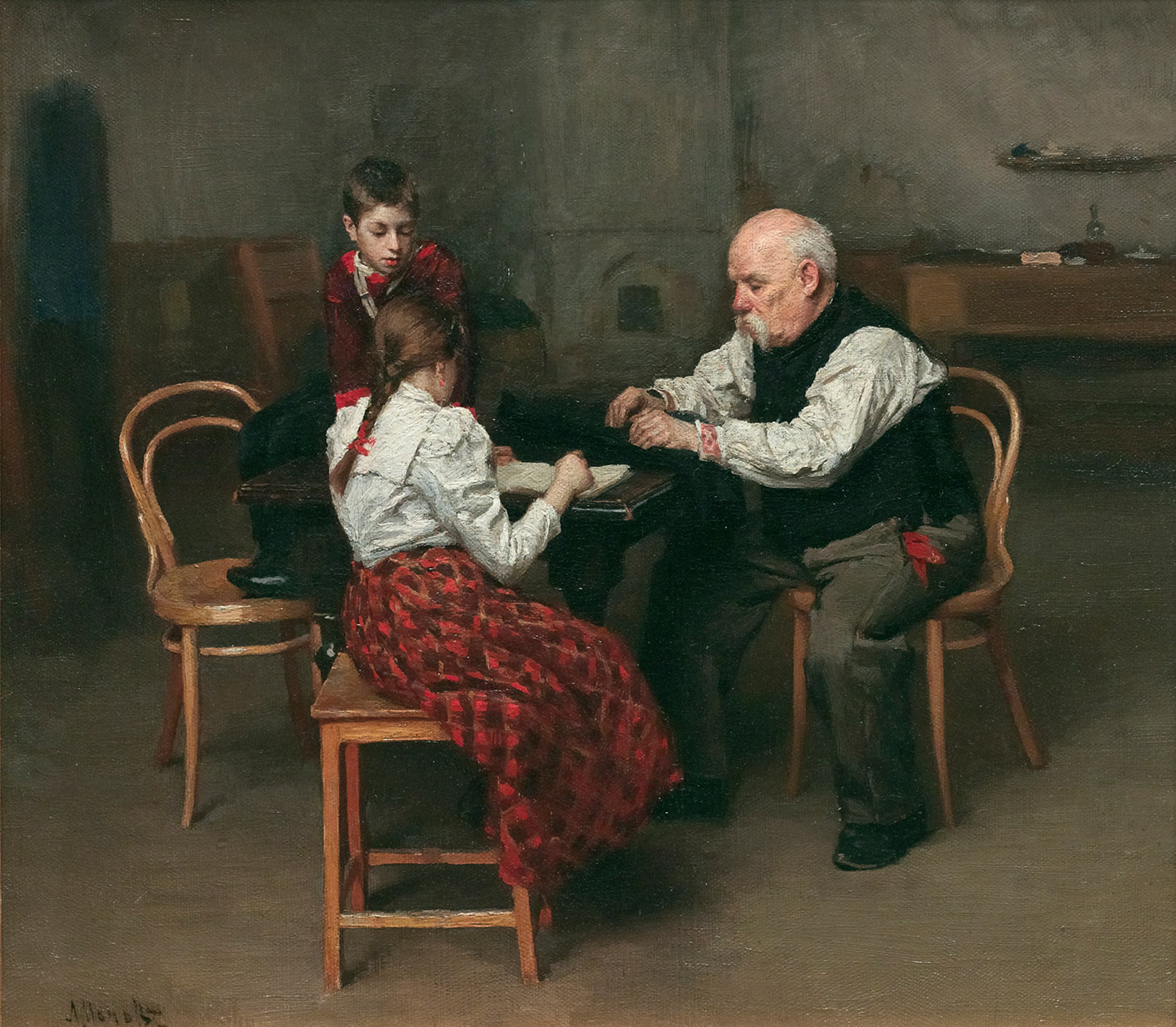
Grandpa helps granddaughter with homework (before 1914)
