= Kuzminovka, Fyodorovsky District, Republic of Bashkortostan =

Kuzminovka Кузьминовка
- Selo
- Location within Bashkortostan Location within Russia
- Coordinates: 53°12′N 55°14′E
- Country: Russia
- Region: Bashkortostan
- District: Fyodorovsky District
- Time zone: UTC+5:00

Kuzminovka (Russian: Кузьминовка) is a rural locality (a selo) in Fyodorovsky Selsoviet, Fyodorovsky District, Bashkortostan, Russia. The population was 439 as of 2010. There are 15 streets.

== Geography ==
Kuzminovka is located 5 km northeast of Fyodorovka (the district's administrative centre) by road. Fyodorovka is the nearest rural locality.
