= Kuzminovka, Kugarchinsky District, Republic of Bashkortostan =

Kuzminovka Кузьминовка
- Village
- Location within Bashkortostan Location within Russia
- Coordinates: 52°41′N 56°41′E
- Country: Russia
- Region: Bashkortostan
- District: Kugarchinsky District
- Time zone: UTC+5:00

Kuzminovka (Russian: Кузьминовка) is a rural locality (a village) in Mrakovsky Selsoviet, Kugarchinsky District, Bashkortostan, Russia. The population was 83 as of 2010. There are 4 streets.

== Geography ==
Kuzminovka is located 6 km southeast of Mrakovo (the district's administrative centre) by road. Kurt-Yelga is the nearest rural locality.
