= List of rural localities in Kurgan Oblast =

Map of Russia with Kurgan Oblast highlighted

This is a list of rural localities in Kurgan Oblast. Kurgan Oblast (Russian: Курга́нская о́бласть, Kurganskaya oblast) is a federal subject of Russia (an oblast). Its administrative center is the city of Kurgan. In June 2014, the population was estimated to be 874,100, down from 910,807 recorded in the 2010 Census.

== Almenevsky District ==
Rural localities in Almenevsky District:

- Almenevo

== Belozersky District ==
Rural localities in Belozersky District:

- Belozerskoye

== Chastoozersky District ==
Rural localities in Chastoozersky District:

- Chastoozerye

== Ketovsky District ==
Rural localities in Ketovsky District:

- Ketovo

== Mokrousovsky District ==
Rural localities in Mokrousovsky District:

- Mokrousovo

== Polovinsky District ==
Rural localities in Polovinsky District:

- Polovinnoye

== Pritobolny District ==
Rural localities in Pritobolny District:

- Glyadyanskoye

== Safakulevsky District ==
Rural localities in Safakulevsky District:

- Safakulevo

== Shatrovsky District ==
Rural localities in Shatrovsky District:

- Shatrovo

== Tselinny District ==
Rural localities in Tselinny District:

- Tselinnoye

== Zverinogolovsky District ==
Rural localities in Zverinogolovsky District:

- Zverinogolovskoye

== See also ==
- Lists of rural localities in Russia
