= List of rural localities in Orenburg Oblast =

Map of Russia with Orenburg Oblast highlighted

This is a list of rural localities in Orenburg Oblast. Orenburg Oblast (Russian: Оренбу́ргская о́бласть, Orenburgskaya oblast) is a federal subject of Russia (an oblast). Its administrative center is the city of Orenburg. From 1938 to 1957, it bore the name Chkalov Oblast (Чка́ловская о́бласть) in honor of Valery Chkalov. Population: 2,033,072 (2010 Census).

== Abdulinsky District ==
Rural localities in Abdulinsky District:

- Abdrakhmanovo

== Adamovsky District ==
Rural localities in Adamovsky District:

- Adamovka

== Akbulaksky District ==
Rural localities in Akbulaksky District:

- Akbulak
- Sagarchin

== Alexandrovsky District ==
Rural localities in Alexandrovsky District:

- Alexandrovka

== Asekeyevsky District ==
Rural localities in Asekeyevsky District:

- Asekeyevo

== Belyayevsky District ==
Rural localities in Belyayevsky District:

- Belyayevka

== Dombarovsky District ==
Rural localities in Dombarovsky District:

- Dombarovsky

== Grachyovsky District ==
Rural localities in Grachyovsky District:

- Grachyovka

== Ileksky District ==
Rural localities in Ileksky District:

- Ilek

== Komarovsky ==
Rural localities in Komarovsky urban okrug:

- Komarovsky

== Krasnogvardeysky District ==
Rural localities in Krasnogvardeysky District:

- Pleshanovo

== Kurmanayevsky District ==
Rural localities in Kurmanayevsky District:

- Kurmanayevka

== Kvarkensky District ==
Rural localities in Kvarkensky District:

- Kvarkeno

== Matveyevsky District ==
Rural localities in Matveyevsky District:

- Matveyevka

== Novoorsky District ==
Rural localities in Novoorsky District:

- Novoorsk

== Novosergiyevsky District ==
Rural localities in Novosergiyevsky District:

- Novosergiyevka

== Oktyabrsky District ==
Rural localities in Oktyabrsky District:

- Oktyabrskoye

== Perevolotsky District ==
Rural localities in Perevolotsky District:

- Abramovka
- Perevolotsky

== Pervomaysky District ==
Rural localities in Pervomaysky District:

- Pervomaysky

== Ponomaryovsky District ==
Rural localities in Ponomaryovsky District:

- Ponomaryovka

== Saraktashsky District ==
Rural localities in Saraktashsky District:

- Saraktash

== Severny District ==
Rural localities in Severny District:

- Severnoye

== Sharlyksky District ==
Rural localities in Sharlyksky District:

- Sharlyk

== Svetlinsky District ==
Rural localities in Svetlinsky District:

- Svetly

== Tashlinsky District ==
Rural localities in Tashlinsky District:

- Tashla

== Totsky District ==
Rural localities in Totsky District:

- Totskoye

== Tyulgansky District ==
Rural localities in Tyulgansky District:

- Tyulgan

== See also ==
- Lists of rural localities in Russia
