= List of rural localities in Samara Oblast =

Map of Russia with Samara Oblast highlighted

This is a list of rural localities in the Samara Oblast. Samara Oblast (Russian: Сама́рская о́бласть, romanized: Samarskaya oblast, IPA: [sɐˈmarskəjə ˈobləsʲtʲ]) is a federal subject of Russia (an oblast). Its administrative center is the city of Samara. From 1935 to 1991, it was known as Kuybyshev Oblast (Russian: Ку́йбышевская о́бласть, romanized: Kuybyshevskaya Oblast, IPA: [ˈkujbɨʂɨfskəjə ˈobləsʲtʲ]). As of the 2010 Census, the population of the oblast was 3,215,532.

== Alexeyevsky District ==
Rural localities in Alexeyevsky District:

- Alexeyevka
- Avangard

== Bezenchuksky District ==
Rural localities in Bezenchuksky District:

- Pokrovka

== Bogatovsky District ==
Rural localities in Bogatovsky District:

- Bogatoye

== Bolshechernigovsky District ==
Rural localities in Bolshechernigovsky District:

- Avgustovka
- Bolshaya Chernigovka
- Bolshaya Glushitsa

== Borsky District, Samara Oblast ==
Rural localities in Borsky District:

- Borskoye

== Chelno-Vershinsky District ==
Rural localities in Chelno-Vershinsky District:

- Chelno-Vershiny

== Isaklinsky District ==
Rural localities in Isaklinsky District:

- Isakly

== Kamyshlinsky District ==
Rural localities in Kamyshlinsky District:

- Kamyshla

== Khvorostyansky District ==
Rural localities in Khvorostyansky District:

- Khvorostyanka

== Kinel-Cherkassky District ==
Rural localities in Kinel-Cherkassky District:

- Kinel-Cherkassy

== Klyavlinsky District ==
Rural localities in Klyavlinsky District:

- Klyavlino

== Koshkinsky District ==
Rural localities in Koshkinsky District:

- Koshki

== Krasnoarmeysky District ==
Rural localities in Krasnoarmeysky District:

- Krasnoarmeyskoye

== Krasnoyarsky District, Samara Oblast ==
Rural localities in Krasnoyarsky District:

- Krasny Yar

== Pestravsky District ==
Rural localities in Pestravsky District:

- Pestravka

== Privolzhsky District ==
Rural localities in Privolzhsky District:

- Privolzhye

== Sergiyevsky District ==
Rural localities in Sergiyevsky District:

- Sergiyevsk

== Shentalinsky District ==
Rural localities in Shentalinsky District:

- Shentala

== Shigonsky District ==
Rural localities in Shigonsky District:

- Shigony
- Volzhsky Utyos

== Yelkhovsky District ==
Rural localities in Yelkhovsky District:

- Yelkhovka

== See also ==
- Lists of rural localities in Russia
