= List of rural localities in Ryazan Oblast =

Map of Russia with Ryazan Oblast highlighted

This is a list of rural localities in Ryazan Oblast. Ryazan Oblast (Russian: Ряза́нская о́бласть, romanized: Ryazanskaya oblast, IPA: [rʲɪˈzanskəjə ˈobləsʲtʲ]) is a federal subject of Russia (an oblast). Its administrative center is the city of Ryazan, which is the oblast's largest city. Population: 1,154,114 (2010 Census).

== Locations ==
- 12 let Oktyabrya
- Abakumovo
- Abryutino
- Abryutinskie Vyselki
- Avangard
- Avdotyinka
- Azeyevo
- Plakhino
- Putyatino
- Seltsy
- Zakharovo

== See also ==
- Lists of rural localities in Russia
