= List of rural localities in Kirov Oblast =

Map of Russia with Kirov Oblast highlighted

This is a list of rural localities in Kirov Oblast. Kirov Oblast (Russian: Ки́ровская о́бласть, Kirovskaya oblast) is a federal subject of Russia (an oblast). Its administrative center is the city of Kirov. Population: 1,341,312 (2010 Census).

== Locations ==
- Damaskino
- Loyno
- Nizhnyaya Toyma
- Pochinok
- Salobelyak

== See also ==
- Lists of rural localities in Russia
