= List of rural localities under jurisdiction of Moscow =

Map of Russia with Moscow highlighted

This is a list of rural localities under the jurisdiction of Moscow. Moscow (/ˈmɒskoʊ/ MOS-koh, US chiefly /ˈmɒskaʊ/ MOS-kow; Russian: Москва́, romanized: Moskvá, IPA: [mɐˈskva]) is the capital and most populous city of Russia, with 13.2 million residents within the city limits, 17 million within the urban area and 20 million within the metropolitan area. Moscow is one of Russia's federal cities, granting it a status of both an inhabited locality and a constituent federal subject.

== Novomoskovsky Administrative Okrug ==
Rural localities in Novomoskovsky Administrative Okrug:

- 1st Rabochiy Poselok
- Kartmazovo, Moscow
- Vatutinki

== Troitsky Administrative Okrug ==
Rural localities in Dobrinsky District:

- Golokhvastovo
- Golokhvastovo
- LMS

== See also ==
- Lists of rural localities in Russia
