= Zverinogolovsky =

Zverinogolovsky (masculine), Zverinogolovskaya (feminine), or Zverinogolovskoye (neuter) may refer to:

- Zverinogolovsky District, a district of Kurgan Oblast, Russia
- Zverinogolovskoye, a rural locality (a selo) in Zverinogolovsky District of Kurgan Oblast, Russia
