= Dombarovsky =

Dombarovsky (masculine), Dombarovskaya (feminine), or Dombarovskoye (neuter) may refer to:

- Dombarovsky District, a district of Orenburg Oblast, Russia
- Dombarovsky (air base), an interceptor aircraft base in Orenburg Oblast, Russia
- Dombarovsky (rural locality), a rural locality (a settlement) in Dombarovsky District of Orenburg Oblast, Russia
