= List of rural localities in Tuva =

Map of Russia with Tuva highlighted

This is a list of rural localities in Tuva. Tuva (/ˈtuːvə/; Russian: Тува́) or Tyva (Tuvan: Тыва), officially the Tyva Republic (Russian: Респу́блика Тыва́, romanized: Respublika Tyva, IPA: [rʲɪˈspublʲɪkə tɨˈva]; Tuvan: Тыва Республика, Tyva Respublika [tʰɯˈʋa resˈpʰuplika]), is a federal subject of Russia (a republic, also defined in the Constitution of the Russian Federation as a state). The Tuvan republic lies at the geographical center of Asia, in southern Siberia. The republic borders the Altai Republic, the Republic of Khakassia, Krasnoyarsk Krai, Irkutsk Oblast, and the Republic of Buryatia in Russia and Mongolia to the south. Its capital is the city of Kyzyl. It has a population of 307,930 (2010 census).

== Locations ==
- Bay-Khaak
- Chaa-Khol
- Erzin
- Khandagayty
- Khovu-Aksy
- Kungurtug
- Kyzyl-Mazhalyk
- Mugur-Aksy
- Samagaltay
- Saryg-Sep
- Sug-Aksy
- Teeli
- Toora-Khem
- Tos-Bulak

== See also ==
- Lists of rural localities in Russia
