= List of rural localities in Tyumen Oblast =

Map of Russia with Tyumen Oblast highlighted; Khanty–Mansi Autonomous Okrug and Yamalo-Nenets Autonomous Okrug within the oblast are highlighted in light red.

This is a list of rural localities in Tyumen Oblast. Tyumen Oblast (Russian: Тюме́нская о́бласть, Tyumenskaya oblast) is a federal subject (an oblast) of Russia. It is geographically located in the Western Siberia region of Siberia, and is administratively part of the Urals Federal District. The oblast has administrative jurisdiction over two autonomous okrugs: Khanty–Mansi Autonomous Okrug and Yamalo-Nenets Autonomous Okrug. Tyumen Oblast including its autonomous okrugs is the third-largest federal subject by area, and has a population of 3,395,755 (2010).

== Tyumen Oblast ==
- Abalak
- Abatskoye
- Armizonskoye
- Aromashevo
- Baykal
- Berdyuzhye
- Bolshoye Sorokino
- Isetskoye
- Kazanskoye
- Nizhnyaya Tavda
- Omutinskoye
- Pokrovskoye
- Sladkovo
- Uporovo
- Uvat
- Vagay
- Vagina
- Vikulovo
- Yarkovo
- Yurginskoye

== Khanty-Mansi Autonomous Okrug ==
Map of Russia with Khanty-Mansi Autonomous Okrug highlighted

- Leushi
- Nyaksimvol
- Sergino

== Yamalo-Nenets Autonomous Okrug ==
Map of Russia with Yamalo-Nenets Autonomous Okrug highlighted

- Antipayuta
- Aksarka
- Katrovozh
- Krasnoselkup
- Muzhi
- Nakhodka
- Novy Port
- Tazovsky
- Yamburg

== See also ==
- Lists of rural localities in Russia
