= Almenevo =

Almenevo (Russian: Альменево) is the name of several rural localities in Russia:

- Almenevo, Kozlovsky District, Chuvash Republic, a village in Yangildinskoye Rural Settlement of Kozlovsky District of the Chuvash Republic
- Almenevo, Vurnarsky District, Chuvash Republic, a selo in Yermoshkinskoye Rural Settlement of Vurnarsky District of the Chuvash Republic
- Almenevo, Kurgan Oblast, a selo in Almenevsky Selsoviet of Almenevsky District of Kurgan Oblast
