= Perevolotsky =

Perevolotsky (masculine), Perevolotskaya (feminine), or Perevolotskoye (neuter) may refer to:

- Perevolotsky District, a district of Orenburg Oblast, Russia
- Perevolotsky (rural locality), a rural locality (a settlement) in Perevolotsky District of Orenburg Oblast, Russia
