= Golokhvastovo =

Golokhvastovo (Russian: Голохвастово) is the name of several rural localities in Russia:

- Golokhvastovo, Novofyodorovskoye Settlement, Troitsky Administrative Okrug, Moscow, village in Novofyodorovskoye Settlement, Troitsky Administrative Okrug, Moscow
- Golokhvastovo, Voronovskoye Settlement, Troitsky Administrative Okrug, Moscow, village in Voronovskoye Settlement, Troitsky Administrative Okrug, Moscow
- Golokhvastovo, Oryol Oblast, village in Orlovsky District, Oryol Oblast
- Golokhvastovo, Tula Oblast, village in Tyoplo-Ogaryovsky District, Tula Oblast
