= List of rural localities in Ulyanovsk Oblast =

Map of Russia with Ulyanovsk Oblast highlighted

This is a list of rural localities in Ulyanovsk Oblast. Ulyanovsk Oblast (Russian: Улья́новская о́бласть, Ulyanovskaya oblast) is a federal subject of Russia (an oblast). It is located in the Volga Federal District. Its administrative center is the city of Ulyanovsk. Population: 1,292,799 (2010 Census).

== Locations ==
- Bolshoye Nagatkino
- Novaya Malykla
- Shakhovskoye
- Stogovka

== See also ==
- Lists of rural localities in Russia
