= List of rural localities in Kalmykia =

Map of Russia with Kalmykia highlighted

This is a list of rural localities in Kalmykia. The Republic of Kalmykia (Russian: Респу́блика Калмы́кия, romanized: Respublika Kalmykiya, IPA: [rʲɪsˈpublʲɪkə kɐlˈmɨkʲɪjə]; Kalmyk: Хальмг Таңһч, Haľmg Tañğç [xɑɮʲˈməg ˈtʰɑŋɣət͡ʃʰə]) is a federal subject of Russia (a republic). As of the 2010 Census, its population was 289,481.

== Locations ==
- Iki-Burul
- Malye Derbety
- Priyutnoye
- Utta
- Zaagin Sala

== See also ==
- Lists of rural localities in Russia
