= List of rural localities in Saratov Oblast =

Map of Russia with Saratov Oblast highlighted

This is a list of rural localities in Saratov Oblast. Saratov Oblast (Russian: Сара́товская о́бласть, Saratovskaya oblast) is a federal subject of Russia (an oblast), located in the Volga Federal District. Its administrative center is the city of Saratov. As of the 2010 Census, its population was 2,521,892.

== Locations ==
- Alexandrov Gay
- Avgustovka
- Baltay
- Ivanteyevka
- Mikhaylovsky
- Perelyub
- Piterka
- Slastukha
- Sosnovka
- Svetly
- Voskresenskoye
- Yablonovka

== See also ==
- Lists of rural localities in Russia
