= Khvorostyansky =

Khvorostyansky (masculine), Khvorostyanskaya (feminine), or Khvorostyanskoye (neuter) may refer to:

- Khvorostyansky District, a district of Samara Oblast, Russia
- Khvorostyanskoye, a rural locality (a village) in the Republic of Bashkortostan, Russia
