= Abramovka, Orenburg Oblast =

Abramovka Абрамовка
- Selo
- Location within Orenburg Oblast Location within Russia
- Coordinates: 52°05′N 54°16′E
- Country: Russia
- Region: Orenburg Oblast
- District: Perevolotsky District
- Time zone: UTC+5:00

Abramovka (Russian: Абрамовка) is a rural locality (a selo) in Perevolotsky District, Orenburg Oblast, Russia. The population was 292 as of 2014. There are 9 streets.

== Geography ==
Abramovka is located 31 km north of Perevolotsky (the district's administrative centre) by road. Yapryntsevo is the nearest rural locality.
