= List of rural localities in Penza Oblast =

Map of Russia with Omsk Oblast highlighted

This is a list of rural settlements in Penza Oblast. Penza Oblast (Russian: Пе́нзенская о́бласть, Penzenskaya oblast) is a federal subject of Russia (an oblast). Its administrative center is the city of Penza. According to the 2010 Census, the population was 1,386,186.

== Localities ==
- Bessonovka
- Kondol
- Lopatino
- Malaya Serdoba
- Mantorovo
- Narovchat
- Neverkino
- Russky Kameshkir
- Vadinsk

== See also ==
- Lists of rural localities in Russia
