= Pritobolny =

Pritobolny (masculine), Pritobolnaya (feminine), or Pritobolnoye (neuter) may refer to:

- Pritobolny District, a district of Kurgan Oblast, Russia
- Pritobolnoye, a rural locality (a selo) in Kurgan Oblast, Russia
