= Tandinsky District =

Tandinsky District Тандинский кожуун (Russian)
- District

Other transcription(s)
  - Tyvan: Таңды кожуун
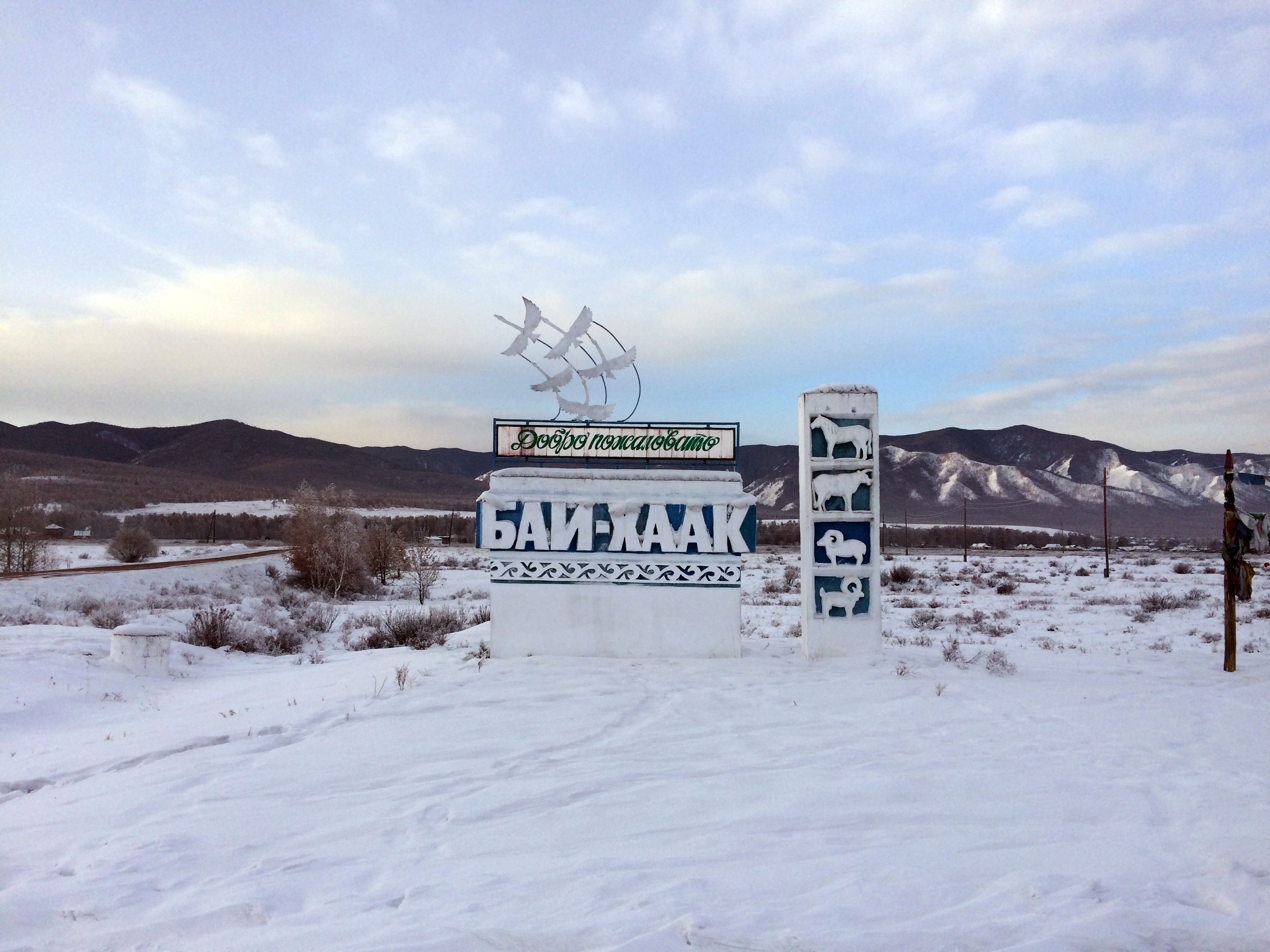
- Bai Hakk, in Tandinsky District

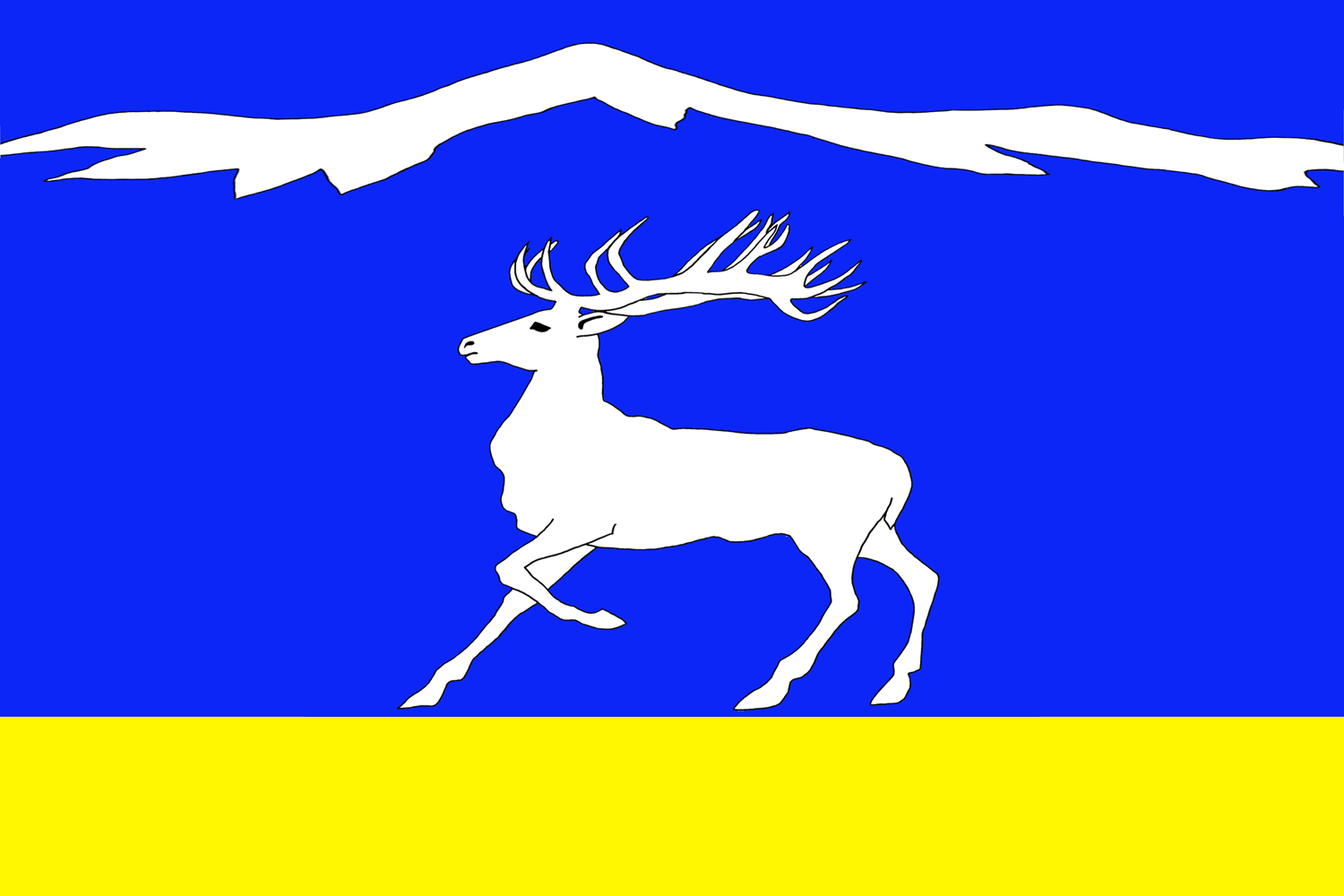
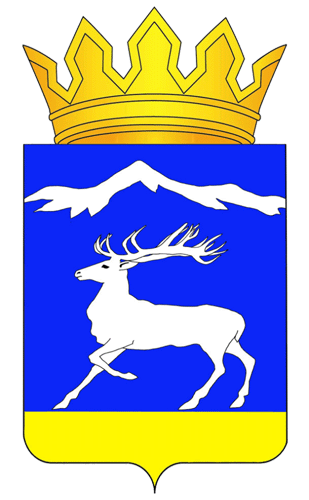
- Flag Coat of arms
- Location of Tandinsky District in the Tuva Republic
- Coordinates: 51.137°N 94.595°E
- Country: Russia
- Federal subject: Tuva Republic
- Administrative center: Bay-Khaak

Area
  - Total: 5,091.70 km^{2} (1,965.92 sq mi)

Population (2010 Census)
  - Total: 12,891
  - Density: 2.5318/km^{2} (6.5572/sq mi)
  - Urban: 0%
  - Rural: 100%

Administrative structure
  - Administrative divisions: 8 sumon
  - Inhabited localities: 13 rural localities

Municipal structure
  - Municipally incorporated as: Tandinsky Municipal District
  - Municipal divisions: 0 urban settlements, 8 rural settlements
- Time zone: UTC+7 (MSK+4)
- OKTMO ID: 93640000
- Website: https://www.tandy-kozhuun.ru/

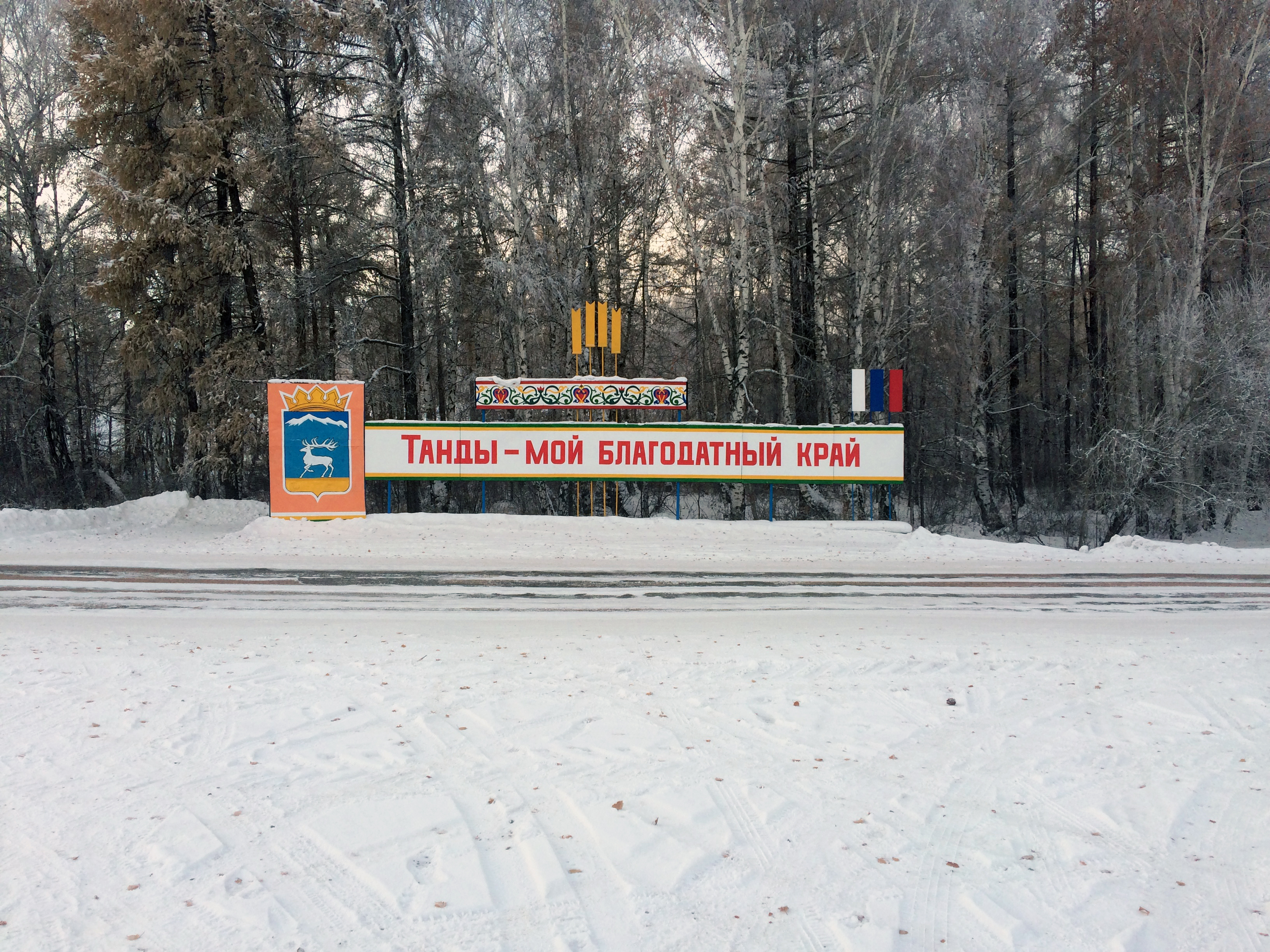
The welcome to the kozhuun

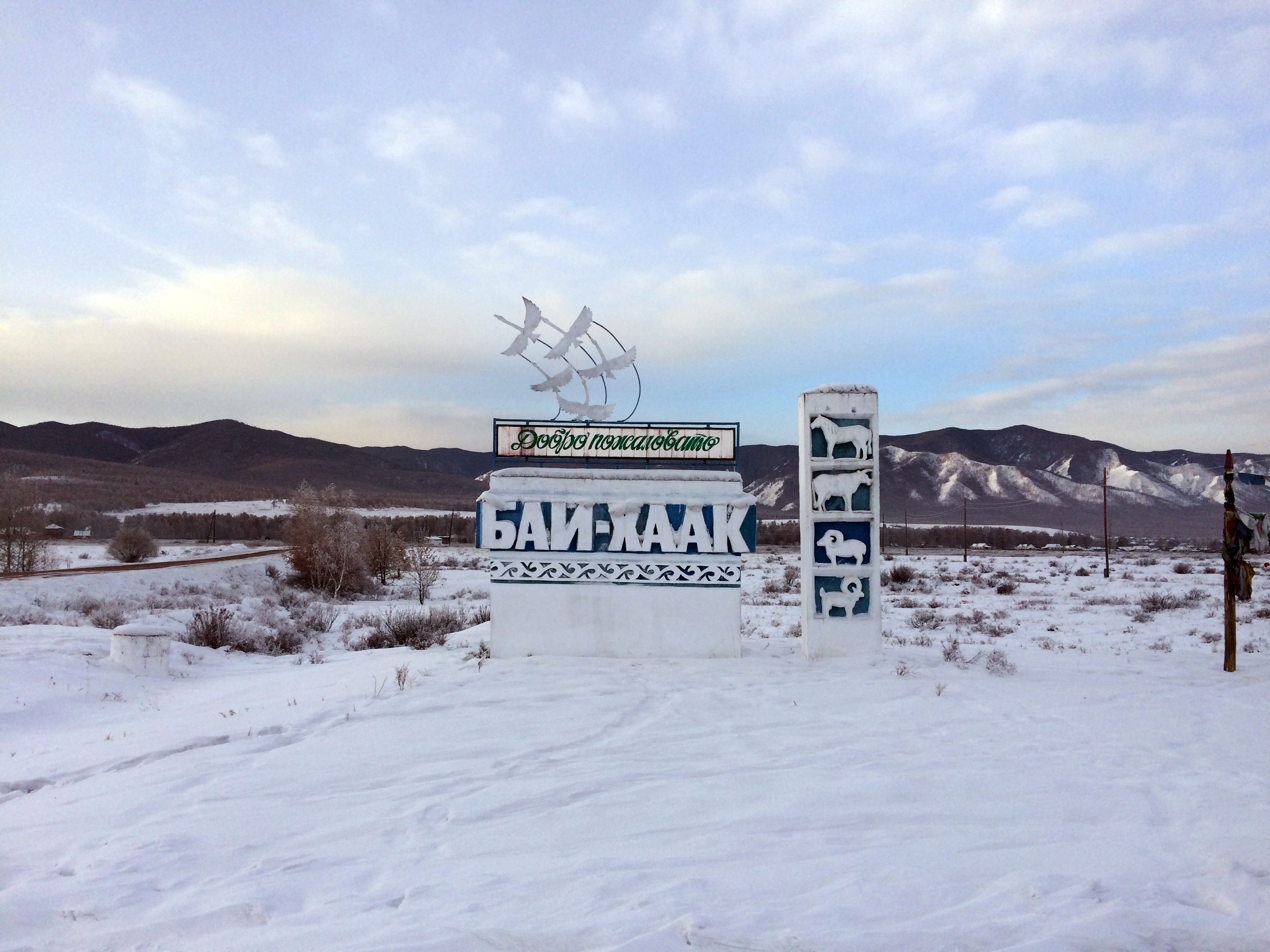
Address of the District' center Bay-Khaak

Tandinsky District (Russian: Танди́нский кожуун; Tuvan: Таңды кожуун, Tañdı kojuun) is an administrative and municipal district (raion, or kozhuun), one of the seventeen in the Tuva Republic, Russia. It is located in the center of the republic. The area of the district is 5,091.70 square kilometers (1,965.92 sq mi). Its administrative center is the rural locality (a selo) of Bay-Khaak. Population: 12,891 (2010 census); 13,827 (2002 Census); 23,653 (1989 Soviet census). The population of Bay-Khaak accounts for 23.1% of the district's total population.
