= List of rural localities in Kamchatka Krai =

Map of Russia with Kamchatka Krai highlighted

This is a list of rural localities in Kamchatka Krai. Kamchatka Krai (Russian: Камча́тский край, romanized: Kamchatsky kray, IPA: [kɐmˈtɕatskʲɪj kraj]) is a federal subject (a krai) of Russia. It is geographically located in the Far East region of the country, and it is administratively part of the Far Eastern Federal District. Kamchatka Krai has a population of 322,079 (2010).

== Aleutsky District ==
Rural localities in Aleutsky District:

- Nikolskoye

== Milkovsky District ==
Rural localities in Milkovsky District:

- Milkovo

== Olyutorsky District ==
Rural localities in Olyutorsky District:

- Korf
- Tilichiki

== Penzhinsky District ==
Rural localities in Penzhinsky District:

- Kamenskoye
- Paren'

== Sobolevsky District ==
Rural localities in Sobolevsky District:

- Sobolevo

== Tigilsky District ==
Rural localities in Tigilsky District:

- Tigil
- Ust-Khayryuzovo

== Ust-Bolsheretsky District ==
Rural localities in Ust-Bolsheretsky District:

- Ust-Bolsheretsk

== Ust-Kamchatsky District ==
Rural localities in Ust-Kamchatsky District:

- Klyuchi
- Ust-Kamchatsk

== See also ==
- Lists of rural localities in Russia
