= Lists of rural localities in Russia =

Federal subjects of Russia. Crimean peninsula and Donbas, internationally recognized as part of Ukraine, shown with diagonal stripes.

This article contains lists of rural localities in Russia, organized by federal subject. The federal subjects of Russia are the constituent entities of Russia, its top-level political divisions according to the Constitution of Russia. Under the classification system for inhabited locations in Russia, a rural locality is one of a number of types of rural settlements, including villages, selos, stanitsas, slobodas, khutors, pochinoks, and other local variations.

== List of localities ==
| Code | Name | Federal district | Economic region |
|---|---|---|---|
| 01 | Adygea | Southern | North Caucasus |
| 02 | Bashkortostan | Volga | Ural |
| 03 | Buryatia | Far Eastern | East Siberian |
| 04 | Altai Republic | Siberian | West Siberian |
| 05 | Dagestan | North Caucasian | North Caucasus |
| 06 | Ingushetia | North Caucasian | North Caucasus |
| 07 | Kabardino-Balkaria | North Caucasian | North Caucasus |
| 08 | Kalmykia | Southern | Volga |
| 09 | Karachay-Cherkessia | North Caucasian | North Caucasus |
| 10 | Karelia | Northwestern | Northern |
| 11 | Komi Republic | Northwestern | Northern |
| 12 | Mari El | Volga | Volga-Vyatka |
| 13 | Mordovia | Volga | Volga-Vyatka |
| 14 | Sakha Republic | Far Eastern | Far Eastern |
| 15 | North Ossetia-Alania | North Caucasian | North Caucasus |
| 16 | Tatarstan | Volga | Volga |
| 17 | Tuva | Siberian | East Siberian |
| 18 | Udmurtia | Volga | Ural |
| 19 | Khakassia | Siberian | East Siberian |
| 20 | Chechnya | North Caucasian | North Caucasus |
| 21 | Chuvashia | Volga | Volga-Vyatka |
| 22 | Altai Krai | Siberian | West Siberian |
| 23 | Krasnodar Krai | Southern | North Caucasus |
| 24 | Krasnoyarsk Krai | Siberian | East Siberian |
| 25 | Primorsky Krai | Far Eastern | Far Eastern |
| 26 | Stavropol Krai | North Caucasian | North Caucasus |
| 27 | Khabarovsk Krai | Far Eastern | Far Eastern |
| 28 | Amur Oblast | Far Eastern | Far Eastern |
| 29 | Arkhangelsk Oblast | Northwestern | Northern |
| 30 | Astrakhan Oblast | Southern | Volga |
| 31 | Belgorod Oblast | Central | Central Black Earth |
| 32 | Bryansk Oblast | Central | Central |
| 33 | Vladimir Oblast | Central | Central |
| 34 | Volgograd Oblast | Southern | Volga |
| 35 | Vologda Oblast | Northwestern | Northern |
| 36 | Voronezh Oblast | Central | Central Black Earth |
| 37 | Ivanovo Oblast | Central | Central |
| 38 | Irkutsk Oblast | Siberian | East Siberian |
| 39 | Kaliningrad Oblast | Northwestern | Kaliningrad |
| 40 | Kaluga Oblast | Central | Central |
| 41 | Kamchatka Krai | Far Eastern | Far Eastern |
| 42 | Kemerovo Oblast | Siberian | West Siberian |
| 43 | Kirov Oblast | Volga | Volga-Vyatka |
| 44 | Kostroma Oblast | Central | Central |
| 45 | Kurgan Oblast | Ural | Ural |
| 46 | Kursk Oblast | Central | Central Black Earth |
| 47 | Leningrad Oblast | Northwestern | Northwestern |
| 48 | Lipetsk Oblast | Central | Central Black Earth |
| 49 | Magadan Oblast | Far Eastern | Far Eastern |
| 50 | Moscow Oblast | Central | Central |
| 51 | Murmansk Oblast | Northwestern | Northern |
| 52 | Nizhny Novgorod Oblast | Volga | Volga-Vyatka |
| 53 | Novgorod Oblast | Northwestern | Northwestern |
| 54 | Novosibirsk Oblast | Siberian | West Siberian |
| 55 | Omsk Oblast | Siberian | West Siberian |
| 56 | Orenburg Oblast | Volga | Ural |
| 57 | Oryol Oblast | Central | Central |
| 58 | Penza Oblast | Volga | Volga |
| 59 | Perm Krai | Volga | Ural |
| 60 | Pskov Oblast | Northwestern | Northwestern |
| 61 | Rostov Oblast | Southern | North Caucasus |
| 62 | Ryazan Oblast | Central | Central |
| 63 | Samara Oblast | Volga | Volga |
| 64 | Saratov Oblast | Volga | Volga |
| 65 | Sakhalin Oblast | Far Eastern | Far Eastern |
| 66 | Sverdlovsk Oblast | Ural | Ural |
| 67 | Smolensk Oblast | Central | Central |
| 68 | Tambov Oblast | Central | Central Black Earth |
| 69 | Tver Oblast | Central | Central |
| 70 | Tomsk Oblast | Siberian | West Siberian |
| 71 | Tula Oblast | Central | Central |
| 72 | Tyumen Oblast | Ural | West Siberian |
| 73 | Ulyanovsk Oblast | Volga | Volga |
| 74 | Chelyabinsk Oblast | Ural | Ural |
| 76 | Yaroslavl Oblast | Central | Central |
| 77 | Moscow | Central | Central |
| 79 | Jewish Autonomous Oblast | Far Eastern | Far Eastern |
| 83 | Nenets Autonomous Okrug | Northwestern | Northern |
| 86 | Khanty-Mansi Autonomous Okrug | Ural | West Siberian |
| 87 | Chukotka Autonomous Okrug | Far Eastern | Far Eastern |
| 89 | Yamalo-Nenets Autonomous Okrug | Ural | West Siberian |
| 92 | Zabaykalsky Krai | Far Eastern | East Siberian |
