= List of rural localities in Magadan Oblast =

List of locations in Russia

Map of Russia with Magadan Oblast highlighted

This is a list of rural localities in Magadan Oblast. Magadan Oblast (Russian: Магаданская область, romanized: Magadanskaya oblast, IPA: [məgɐˈdanskəjə ˈobləsʲtʲ]) is a federal subject (an oblast) of Russia. It is geographically located in the Far East region of the country, and is administratively part of the Far Eastern Federal District. Magadan Oblast has a population of 156,996 (2010 Census), making it the least populated oblast and the third-least populated federal subject in Russia.

== Olsky District ==
Rural localities in Olsky District:

- Yamsk
- Arman

== Severo-Evensky District ==
Rural localities in Severo-Evensky District:

- Gizhiga

== Srednekansky District ==
Rural localities in Srednekansky District:

- Ust-Srednekan

== See also ==
- Lists of rural localities in Russia
