= Tes-Khemsky District =

Russian district in the Tuva Republic

Tes-Khemsky District Тес-Хемский кожуун (Russian)
- District

Other transcription(s)
  - Tuvan: Тес-Хем кожуун
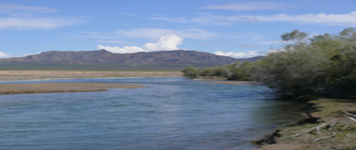
- Tes-Khem River in Tes-Khemsky District

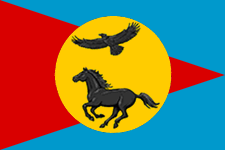
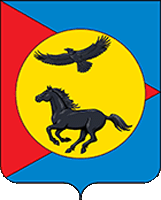
- Flag Coat of arms
- Location of Tes-Khemsky District in the Tuva Republic
- Coordinates: 50.564°N 93.262°E
- Country: Russia
- Federal subject: Tuva Republic
- Administrative center: Samagaltay

Area
  - Total: 6,680 km^{2} (2,580 sq mi)

Population (2010 Census)
  - Total: 8,174
  - Density: 1.22/km^{2} (3.17/sq mi)
  - Urban: 0%
  - Rural: 100%

Administrative structure
  - Administrative divisions: 7 sumon
  - Inhabited localities: 8 rural localities

Municipal structure
  - Municipally incorporated as: Tes-Khemsky Municipal District
  - Municipal divisions: 0 urban settlements, 7 rural settlements
- Time zone: UTC+7 (MSK+4)
- OKTMO ID: 93645000
- Website: http://www.teshem.ru/

Tes-Khemsky District (Russian: Тес-Хемский кожуун, romanized: Tes-Hemskij kožuun, [tʲɪs‿ˈxʲemskʲij kɐˈʐuːn]; Tuvan: Тес-Хем кожууну, romanized: Tes-Xem kojuunu, [tʰesˈçem qʰɔʑuːˈnʊ]) is an administrative and municipal district (raion, or kozhuun), one of the seventeen in the Tuva Republic, Russia. It is located in the south of the republic. The area of the district is 6,680 square kilometers (2,580 sq mi). Its administrative center is the rural locality (a selo) of Samagaltay. Its population was 8,174 (2010 census); 8,908 (2002 Census); 10,413 (1989 Soviet census). The population of Samagaltay accounts for 39.6% of the district's total population.
