= List of rural localities in Mari El =

Map of Russia with Mari El highlighted

This is a list of rural localities in the Mari El Republic. Mari El (Russian: Респу́блика Мари́й Эл, Respublika Mariy El; Meadow Mari: Марий Эл Республик; Hill Mari: Мары Эл Республик) is a federal subject of Russia (a republic). It is geographically located in the European Russia region of the country, along the northern bank of the Volga River, and is administratively part of the Volga Federal District. The Mari El Republic has a population of 696,459 (2010 Census).

== Volzhsky District ==
Rural localities in Volzhsky District:

== Zvenigovsky District ==
Rural localities in Zvenigovsky District:

- Kokshaysk

== See also ==
- Lists of rural localities in Russia
