= List of rural localities in North Ossetia–Alania =

Map of Russia with North Ossetia-Alania highlighted

This is a list of rural localities in North Ossetia-Alania. The Republic of North Ossetia-Alania (Russian: Республика Северная Осетия-Алания, romanized: Respublika Severnaya Osetiya-Alaniya, IPA: [rʲɪˈspublʲɪkə ˈsʲevʲɪrnəjə ɐˈsʲetʲɪjə ɐˈlanʲɪjə]; Ossetian: Республикӕ Цӕгат Ирыстон-Алани, Respublikæ Cægat Iryston-Alani, Ossetian pronunciation: [resˈpublikə t͡səˈgat irɨˈʃton-aˈlani]) is a federal subject of Russia (a republic). Its population according to the 2010 Census was 712,980. Its capital is the city of Vladikavkaz.

== Locations ==
- Abaytikau
- Chikola
- Dargavs
- Elkhotovo
- Mizur
- Oktyabrskoye
- Verkhny Fiagdon

== See also ==
- Lists of rural localities in Russia
