= Stogovka =

Rural locality in Russia

Coordinates: 53°58′N 48°01′E

Stogovka (Russian: Стоговка) is a rural locality (a selo) in Kuzovatovsky District of Ulyanovsk Oblast, Russia.

It has an approximate population of 200 people but in the summer it increases to about 750 as people come to live at their dachas. There are three shops and a community center which is mainly used as a nightclub at night and as a pool area for kids to play during the day.
