= Bay-Khaak =

Bay-Khaak Бай-Хаак
- Selo

Other transcription(s)
  - Tuvan: Бай-Хаак
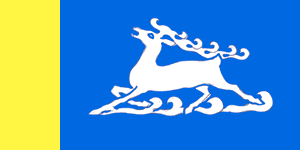
- Flag
- Interactive map of Bay-Khaak
- Location of Bay-Khaak Bay-Khaak (Tuva Republic)
- Coordinates: 51°09′38″N 94°27′57″E
- Country: Russia
- Federal subject: Tuva
- Administrative district: Tandinsky District
- SumonSelsoviet: Bay-Khaaksky
- Founded: 1909
- Elevation: 888 m (2,913 ft)

Population (2010 Census)
  - Total: 2,981
  - Estimate (2021): 3,523 (+18.2%)

Administrative status
  - Capital of: Tandinsky District, Bay-Khaaksky Sumon

Municipal status
  - Municipal district: Tandinsky Municipal District
  - Rural settlement: Bay-Khaaksky Sumon Rural Settlement
  - Capital of: Tandinsky Municipal District, Bay-Khaaksky Sumon Rural Settlement
- Time zone: UTC+7 (MSK+4)
- Postal code: 668310
- OKTMO ID: 93640422101

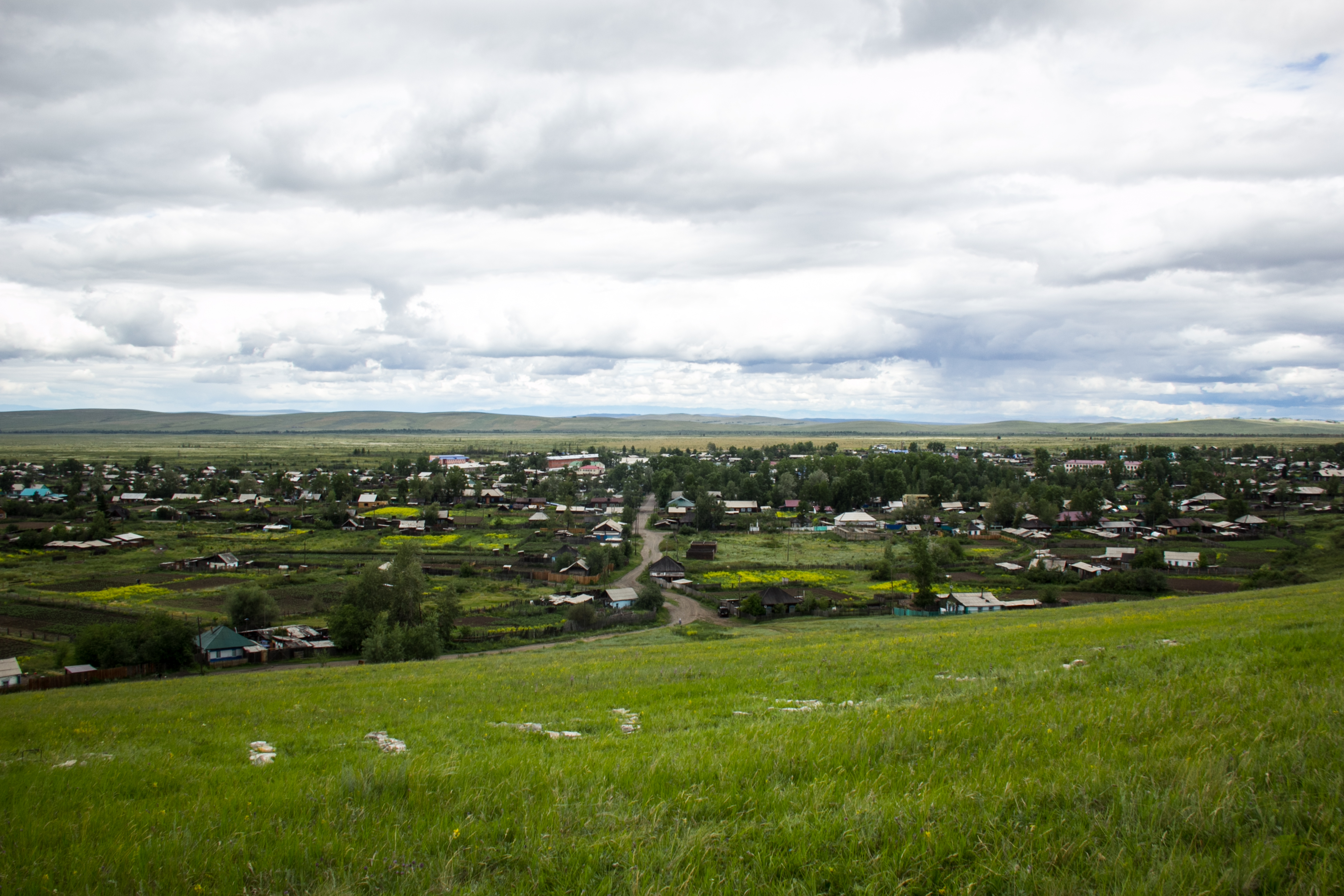

Bay-Khaak (Russian: Бай-Хаак; Tuvan: Бай-Хаак, romanized: Bay-Xaak) is a rural locality (a selo) and the administrative center of Tandinsky District of Tuva, Russia. Population: 2,981 (2010 census); 3,084 (2002 census); 3,077 (1989 Soviet census).

== History ==
Bay-Khaak was originally established under the name Verkhne-Nikolskoye by Russian farmers. By 1913, the settlement had grown to include 34 families. The establishment of the village was part of the broader Russian colonization efforts, which saw many settlers move into the region for agricultural purposes.

In 1932, Verkhne-Nikolskoye was renamed Bay-Khaak and became the administrative center of the Tandinsky District within the newly formed Tuvan People's Republic (TNR). By this time, Bay-Khaak had grown substantially, and its role as a district center marked a new era of political and economic importance for the settlement.

=== Tuvan People's Republic and the Russian Civil War ===
Bay-Khaak, along with its surrounding areas, was an important location during the Russian Civil War and the early revolutionary period in Tuva. The settlement became a center for revolutionary activities in the region. In nearby Sug-Bazhy, the historic Tuvan Khural (Congress) took place in August 1921. It was here that the creation of the Tuvan People's Republic (TNR), an independent state in Central Asia, was proclaimed. This event marked a significant turning point in the region’s history, as Tuva embarked on a path towards greater autonomy, eventually aligning with the Soviet Union.

=== Soviet era ===
During the Soviet era, Bay-Khaak saw substantial growth and industrial development. It became a major hub for forestry and processing industries, as well as agriculture and communications.

One of the notable figures associated with Bay-Khaak is Alexander Turgen-ool, one of the first Tuvans to be honored with the title Hero of Socialist Labor for his contributions to the agricultural sector.

=== Modern Bay-Khaak ===
As of 2009, there are over 900 families and 3,200 people living in Bay-Khaak.
