= Abryutinskie Vyselki =

Abryutinskie Vyselki Абрютинские Выселки
- Village
- Location within Ryazan Oblast Location within Russia
- Coordinates: 54°32′N 39°33′E
- Country: Russia
- Region: Ryazan Oblast
- District: Ryazansky District
- Time zone: UTC+3:00

Abryutinskie Vyselki (Russian: Абрютинские Выселки) is a rural locality (a village) in Yekimovskoye Rural Settlement of Ryazansky District, Ryazan Oblast, Russia. The population was 4 as of 2010.

== Geography ==
Abryutinskie Vyselki is located 19 km southwest of Ryazan (the district's administrative centre) by road. Abryutino is the nearest rural locality.
