= Pestravka =

Rural locality in Samara Oblast, Russia

Coordinates: 52°24′30″N 49°57′38″E

Pestravka (Russian: Пестравка) is a rural locality (a selo) and the administrative center of Pestravsky District, Samara Oblast, Russia. Population: 6,573 (2010 census); 6,675 (2002 census); 6,442 (1989 Soviet census).
