= Leushi =

Leushi Леуши
- Selo
- Interactive map of Leushi
- Location of Leushi Leushi (Khanty–Mansi Autonomous Okrug)
- Coordinates: 59°37′N 65°43′E
- Country: Russia
- Federal subject: Khanty-Mansi Autonomous Okrug
- Administrative district: Kondinsky District

Population
  - Estimate (2010): 1,197 )
- Time zone: UTC+5 (MSK+2)
- Postal code: 628212
- OKTMO ID: 71816416101

Leushi (Russian: Леуши) is a rural locality (a selo) in Kondinsky District of Khanty-Mansi Autonomous Okrug, Russia.

== Climate ==
Leushi has a subarctic climate (Köppen climate classification Dfc), with very cold winters and warm summers. Precipitation is moderate and is significantly higher in summer than at other times of the year.

Climate data for Leushi
Month	Jan	Feb	Mar	Apr	May	Jun	Jul	Aug	Sep	Oct	Nov	Dec	Year
Record high °C (°F)	3.7 (38.7)	8.3 (46.9)	15.2 (59.4)	29.0 (84.2)	33.8 (92.8)	36.4 (97.5)	35.7 (96.3)	34.1 (93.4)	30.6 (87.1)	23.5 (74.3)	10.7 (51.3)	4.0 (39.2)	36.4 (97.5)
Mean daily maximum °C (°F)	−13.8 (7.2)	−11.2 (11.8)	−2.4 (27.7)	6.7 (44.1)	14.6 (58.3)	21.0 (69.8)	23.2 (73.8)	19.7 (67.5)	13.3 (55.9)	4.1 (39.4)	−5.6 (21.9)	−11.4 (11.5)	4.9 (40.7)
Daily mean °C (°F)	−17.7 (0.1)	−15.8 (3.6)	−7.4 (18.7)	1.6 (34.9)	8.9 (48.0)	15.5 (59.9)	18.2 (64.8)	14.9 (58.8)	8.8 (47.8)	0.7 (33.3)	−9.0 (15.8)	−15.1 (4.8)	0.3 (32.5)
Mean daily minimum °C (°F)	−21.5 (−6.7)	−20.0 (−4.0)	−12.1 (10.2)	−2.9 (26.8)	3.9 (39.0)	10.4 (50.7)	13.4 (56.1)	10.5 (50.9)	5.1 (41.2)	−2.2 (28.0)	−12.3 (9.9)	−18.9 (−2.0)	−3.9 (25.0)
Record low °C (°F)	−46.0 (−50.8)	−45.1 (−49.2)	−37.9 (−36.2)	−27.5 (−17.5)	−13.2 (8.2)	−3.0 (26.6)	1.4 (34.5)	−1.4 (29.5)	−8.0 (17.6)	−27.9 (−18.2)	−40.1 (−40.2)	−48.3 (−54.9)	−48.3 (−54.9)
Average precipitation mm (inches)	19.5 (0.77)	15.0 (0.59)	17.5 (0.69)	23.1 (0.91)	39.2 (1.54)	63.8 (2.51)	76.8 (3.02)	70.6 (2.78)	56.8 (2.24)	36.7 (1.44)	28.8 (1.13)	22.3 (0.88)	470.1 (18.5)
Average precipitation days (≥ 0.1 mm)	15.2	12.1	10.9	10.4	11.7	13.0	13.1	14.2	14.5	15.6	15.3	16.2	162.2
Average relative humidity (%)	79.6	75.5	68.9	61.7	58.8	66.9	66.9	72.9	76.8	76.0	82.5	80.1	72.2
Mean monthly sunshine hours	50.0	105.0	173.0	218.0	267.0	298.0	308.0	228.0	137.0	85.0	53.0	30.0	1,952
Source: climatebase.ru (1936-2012)
