= Komarovsky, Orenburg Oblast =

Closed settlement in Orenburg Oblast, Russia

Komarovsky Комаровский
- Settlement
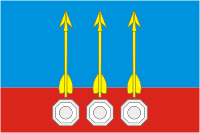
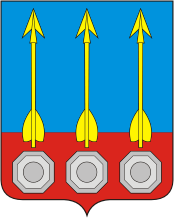
- Flag Coat of arms
- Interactive map of Komarovsky
- Location of Komarovsky Komarovsky (Orenburg Oblast)
- Coordinates: 51°01′55″N 59°50′42″E
- Country: Russia
- Federal subject: Orenburg Oblast

Population (2010 Census)
  - Total: 8,064
  - Estimate (2025): 6,295 (−21.9%)

Administrative status
  - Subordinated to: closed administrative-territorial formation of Komarovsky
  - Capital of: closed administrative-territorial formation of Komarovsky

Municipal status
  - Urban okrug: Komarovsky Urban Okrug
  - Capital of: Komarovsky Urban Okrug
- Time zone: UTC+5 (MSK+2)
- Postal code: 462781
- OKTMO ID: 53755000101
- Website: www.zato-kom.orb.ru

Komarovsky (Russian: Комаро́вский) is a closed rural locality (a settlement) in Orenburg Oblast, Russia. Population: 8,064 (2010 census); 8,344 (2002 census).

== History ==
Komarovsky was granted urban-type settlement status in 1994. However, the law on the administrative-territorial division of Orenburg Oblast, passed in July 2007 and currently in effect, no longer provides for such a status, making the settlement classified as rural. Nevertheless, some of the more recent sources, such as, for example, the results of the 2010 Census, continue listing Komarovsky under the urban-type settlement designation.

== Administrative and municipal status ==
Within the framework of administrative divisions, it is incorporated as the closed administrative-territorial formation of Komarovsky—an administrative unit with the status equal to that of the districts. As a municipal division, the closed administrative-territorial formation of Komarovsky is incorporated as Komarovsky Urban Okrug.
