= Novoorsky District =

Novoorsky District Новоорский район (Russian)
- District
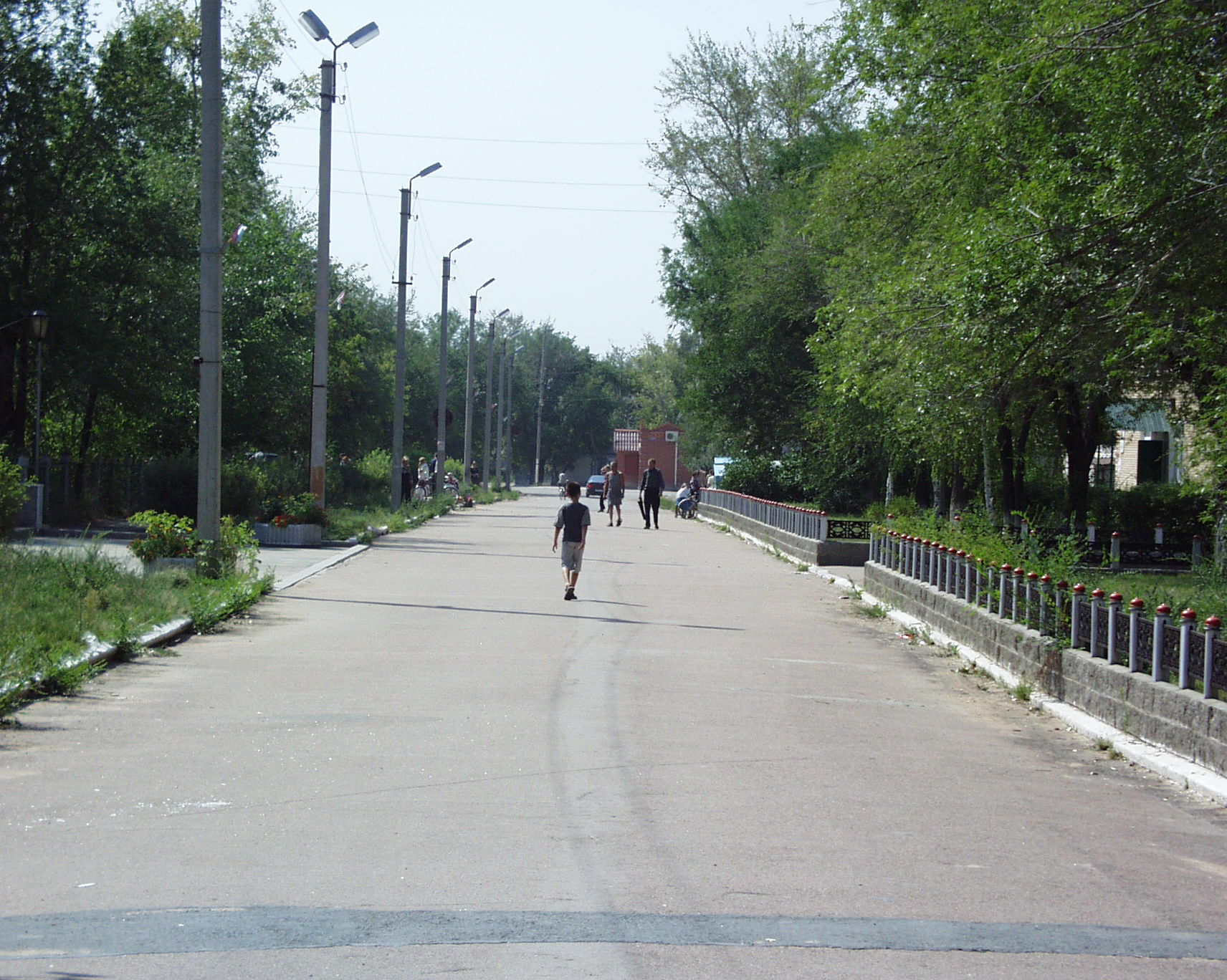
- Street in Komarova, Novoorsky District

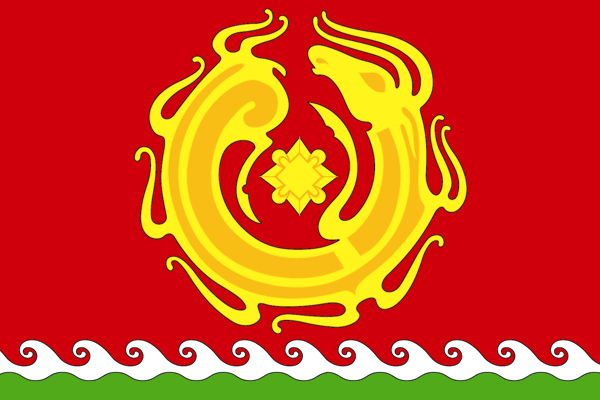
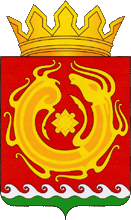
- Flag Coat of arms
- Location of Novoorsky District in Orenburg Oblast
- Coordinates: 51°21′50″N 59°02′04″E
- Country: Russia
- Federal subject: Orenburg Oblast
- Administrative center: Novoorsk

Area
  - Total: 2,900 km^{2} (1,100 sq mi)

Population (2010 Census)
  - Total: 29,428
  - Density: 10/km^{2} (26/sq mi)
  - Urban: 0%
  - Rural: 100%

Administrative structure
  - Administrative divisions: 7 selsoviet, 2 settlement council
  - Inhabited localities: 23 rural localities

Municipal structure
  - Municipally incorporated as: Novoorsky Municipal District
  - Municipal divisions: 0 urban settlements, 9 rural settlements
- Time zone: UTC+5 (MSK+2)
- OKTMO ID: 53630000
- Website: http://www.neworsk56.ru/

Novoorsky District (Russian: Новоо́рский райо́н) is an administrative and municipal district (raion), one of the thirty-five in Orenburg Oblast, Russia. The area of the district is 2,900 square kilometers (1,100 sq mi). Its administrative center is the rural locality (a settlement) of Novoorsk. Population: 29,428 (2010 Census); 33,085 (2002 census); 34,231 (1989 Soviet census). The population of Novoorsk accounts for 38.4% of the district's total population.
