= Khvorostyanka, Samara Oblast =

Rural locality in Samara Oblast, Russia

Coordinates: 52°36′46″N 48°57′43″E

Khvorostyanka (Russian: Хворостянка) is a rural locality (a selo) and the administrative center of Khvorostyansky District, Samara Oblast, Russia. Population: 5,161 (2010 census); 4,937 (2002 census); 4,258 (1989 Soviet census).
