= 12 let Oktyabrya =

12 let Oktyabrya 12 лет Октября
- Settlement
- Location within Ryazan Oblast Location within Russia
- Coordinates: 54.375°N 41.804167°E
- Country: Russia
- Region: Ryazan Oblast
- District: Sasovsky District
- Time zone: UTC+07:00

12 let Oktyabrya (Russian: 12 лет Октября) is a rural locality (a settlement) in Kargashinskoye Rural Settlement of Sasovsky District, Russia. The population was 9 as of 2010.

== Geography ==
12 let Oktyabrya is located 11 km northwest of Sasovo (the district's administrative centre) by road. Frolovskoye is the nearest rural locality.
