= Samagaltay =

Samagaltay Самагалтай
- Selo

Other transcription(s)
  - Tuvan: Самагалдай
- Flag
- Location of Samagaltay
- Location of Samagaltay Samagaltay (Tuva Republic)
- Coordinates: 50°36′02″N 95°00′12″E
- Country: Russia
- Federal subject: Tuva
- Administrative district: Tes-Khemsky District
- Sumon: Samagaltaysky
- Founded: 1773
- Elevation: 1,250 m (4,100 ft)

Population (2010 Census)
  - Total: 3,233

Administrative status
  - Capital of: Tes-Khemsky District, Samagaltaysky Sumon

Municipal status
  - Municipal district: Tes-Khemsky Municipal District
  - Rural settlement: Samagaltaysky Sumon Rural Settlement
  - Capital of: Tes-Khemsky Municipal District, Samagaltaysky Sumon Rural Settlement
- Time zone: UTC+7 (MSK+4)
- Postal code(s): 668360
- OKTMO ID: 93645433101

Samagaltay (Russian: Самагалтай; Tuvan: Самагалдай, romanized: Samagalday) is a rural locality (a selo) and the administrative center of Tes-Khemsky District of Tuva, Russia. Population: 3,233 (2010 Census); 3,507 (2002 Census); 3,648 (1989 Soviet census).

== History ==
Samagaltay was established in 1773 and became one of the first spiritual and administrative centers of Tuva. It was also the capital of Tuva until 1921. The settlement was not only a political hub but also a spiritual center, housing the residence of the Kamby Lama, the spiritual leader of Tuva.

=== 20th century and modern Samagaltay ===
During the 20th century, particularly in the years following the unification with the Soviet Union, Samagaltay remained an important settlement, though it no longer served as the capital. In modern times, the town continues to be a symbol of Tuvan heritage and identity.

The district has seen continued investment in infrastructure, including the construction of sports facilities and the allocation of funds for various development projects. In Samagaltay, a sports facility for the local school received 2.26 million rubles of funding.
