= Safakulevo =

Rural locality in Kurgan Oblast, Russia

Coordinates: 54°59′25″N 62°32′23″E

Safakulevo (Russian: Сафакулево) is a rural locality (a selo) and the administrative center of Safakulevsky District, Kurgan Oblast, Russia. Population: 3,629 (2010 census); 4,286 (2002 census); 4,557 (1989 Soviet census).
