= Salobelyak =

Salobelyak Салобелякское
- village
- Location in Kirov Oblast
- Coordinates: 57°6′21″N 48°3′28″E
- Country: Russia
- Federal subject: Kirov
- Raion: Yaransky

Area
  - Total: 1.71 km^{2} (0.66 sq mi)

Population (2021)
  - Total: 741
  - Density: 433/km^{2} (1,120/sq mi)
- Time zone: UTC+3 (MSK)
- Postal code: 612240

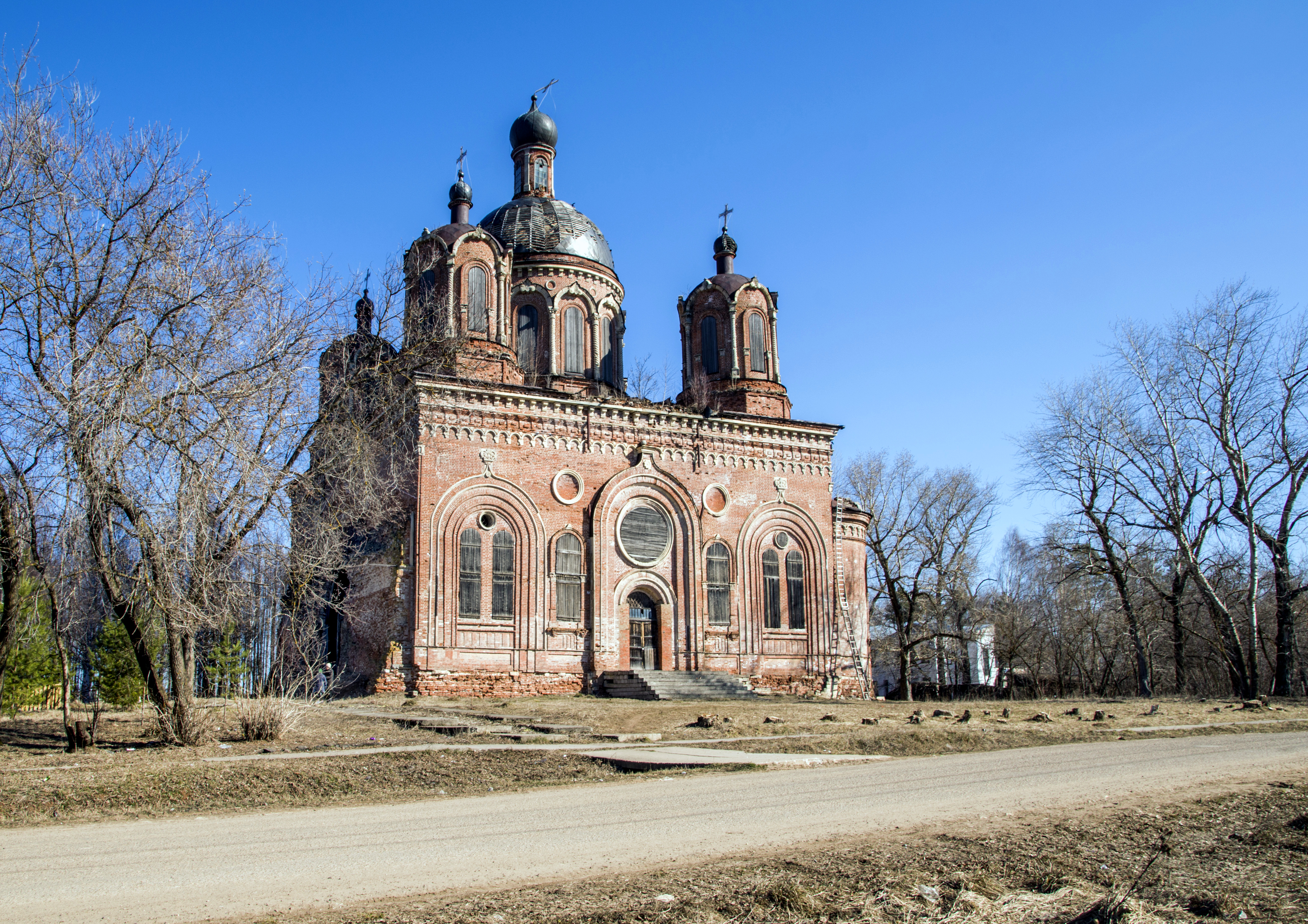
Trinity Church: Salobelyaki, Yaransky District, Kirov Oblast

Salobelyak (Russian: Салобелякское) also Salobelyaksky and Salobeljak is a village and rural municipality in Yaransky District, Kirov Oblast, Russia. Salobelyak is situated along the Yaran River and has one village hall, garden park, church, school and 33 small roads according to Google Maps.

== History and geography ==
Salobelyak's municipality was administered on January 1, 2006 by the Kirov federal government from forming multiple abolished, smaller municipalities into one. Salobelyak's administrative center is its own village with the same name, Salobelyak. As of 2021, Onosov Yuri Anatolievich is the head of the Salobelyak municipality. There are 12 settlements under the jurisdiction of Salobelyak's rural municipality:

- Bakhtinsky (abandoned)
- Verkhoslino
- Komary
- Kushovo
- Magazeyskie
- Nagishi
- Pakhtaevo
- Petukhovo
- Salobelyak
- Urbezh-Kurbatovo
- Cherkaner (abandoned)
- Shulkomuchaksh
- Engener

Salobelyak's village has historical records dating back to 1676, but it officially became a village in 1842, when its church was built. In 1873, there were 120 residents and 21 households in the village. This rose to 250 residents and 52 households in 1905.

== Population ==
As of 2021, Salobelyak's rural municipality had a population of 741, which was a 3.41% decrease from the population in the previous year. Below is a population table for the municipality:

Population table for Salobelyak's rural municipality
2010	2012	2013	2014	2015	2016	2017	2018	2019	2020	2021
1,084	1,041	998	960	929	867	854	823	786	764	741

As of 2021, Salobelyak's village has a population of 544. In 2002, the village's population structure was made up of 61% Russians and 38% Mari.
