= Abryutino =

Abryutino Абрютино
- Selo
- Location within Ryazan Oblast Location within Russia
- Coordinates: 54°32′N 39°33′E
- Country: Russia
- Region: Ryazan Oblast
- District: Ryazansky District
- Time zone: UTC+3:00

Abryutino (Russian: Абрютино) is a rural locality (a selo) in Yekimovskoye Rural Settlement of Ryazansky District, Ryazan Oblast, Russia. The population was 13 as of 2010. There are 2 streets.

== Geography ==
Abryutino is located 18 km southwest of Ryazan (the district's administrative centre) by road. Abryutinskie Vyselki is the nearest rural locality.
