= Glyadyanskoye =

Rural locality in Kurgan Oblast, Russia

Coordinates: 54°54′22″N 65°05′05″E

Glyadyanskoye (Russian: Глядянское) is a rural locality (a selo) and the administrative center of Pritobolny District, Kurgan Oblast, Russia. Population: 3,964 (2010 census); 4,335 (2002 census); 4,993 (1989 Soviet census).
