= Pochinok, Kirov Oblast =

Rural locality in Verkhoshizhemsky District, Russia

Coordinates: 58°04′06″N 49°36′12″E

Pochinok (Russian: Починок) is a village in Verkhoshizhemsky District of Kirov Oblast, Russia.
