= 1st Rabochiy Poselok =

Town in Moscow region, Russia

1st Rabochiy Poselok 1-й Рабочий Посёлок
- Settlement
- Location within Moscow Location within Russia
- Coordinates: 55.653333°N 37.290556°E
- Country: Russia
- Region: Moscow
- District: Novomoskovsky Administrative Okrug
- Time zone: UTC+03:00

1st Rabochiy Poselok (Russian: 1-й Рабочий Посёлок) is a rural locality (a settlement) in Vnukovskoye Settlement of Novomoskovsky Administrative Okrug, Russia. The population was 8 as of 2010.

== Geography ==
The village is located 500 m south-west from Gubkino village.

== Streets ==
There are no streets with titles.
