= Novoorsk =

Rural locality in Orenburg Oblast, Russia

Novoorsk Новоорск
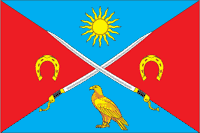
- Flag
- Interactive map of Novoorsk
- Location of Novoorsk Novoorsk (Orenburg Oblast)
- Coordinates: 51°22′52″N 58°58′53″E
- Country: Russia
- Federal subject: Orenburg Oblast
- Founded: 1715

Population (2010 Census)
  - Total: 11,295
  - Estimate (2021): 11,071 (−2%)
- Time zone: UTC+5 (MSK+2)
- Postal code: 462800
- OKTMO ID: 53630414101

Novoorsk (Russian: Новоорск) is a rural locality (a settlement) and the administrative center of Novoorsky District, Orenburg Oblast, Russia. Population: 11,295 (2010 census); 11,274 (2002 census); 10,411 (1989 Soviet census).
