= Zaagin Sala =

Rural locality in Tselinny District, Kalmykia, Russia

Coordinates: 46°41′25″N 044°07′03″E

Zaagin Sala (Russian: Заагин Сала) is a rural locality (a settlement) in Tselinny District of the Republic of Kalmykia, Russia.
