= Sosnovka, Marksovsky District, Saratov Oblast =

Rural locality in Marksovsky District, Saratov Oblast, Russia

Coordinates: 51°48′32″N 46°59′25″E

Sosnovka (Russian: Сосно́вка) is a rural locality (a selo) in Marksovsky District of Saratov Oblast, Russia. Municipally, it is a part of Podlesnovskoye Rural Settlement of Marksovsky Municipal District.

== History ==
It was established as the German colony of Susannental (Сусанненталь; also spelled Сузанненталь, Suzannental; Сузенталь, Suzental; and Сузаненталь, Suzanental) on August 3, 1767 by Baron Caneau de Beauregard, who named the colony after his wife. It was located about 60 kilometers (37 mi) north of Saratov on the east side of the Volga River. Nineteen ethnic German families who had been lured to the area by free land originally populated the village. The land had been offered by Catherine II for two main reasons: firstly, to fill vast areas of land with subjects that could be taxed, and secondly, to create a buffer zone between Russia proper and nomads that were difficult to govern. The immigrants were Lutheran.

In 1864, the village had a trade school and a population of 642 (338 males and 304 females), living in 61 homesteads.

By 1910, the population grew to 1,883 (992 male and 891 female), living in 172 homesteads, and had a church, a parochial school, and a zemstvo school.

The German colony rapidly fell apart in the early 1900s, due to emigration, famines, wars, and deportations.
