= Mantorovo =

Mantorovo Манторово
- Rural locality
- Interactive map of Mantorovo
- Location of Mantorovo Mantorovo (Penza Oblast)
- Coordinates: 53°36′18″N 45°15′19″E
- Country: Russia
- Federal subject: Penza Oblast
- Administrative district: Luninsky District

Population (2010 Census)
  - Total: 1,159
  - Estimate (2010): 1,159 (0%)
- Time zone: UTC+3 (MSK)
- Postal code: 442730
- OKTMO ID: 56643425116

Mantorovo, Penza Oblast (Russian: Манторово) is a rural village (деревня, derevnya) and a subject of the Russian Federation (see inhabited localities in Russia). Population: 1,159 (2010 census); 1,139 (2002 census);
