= Safakulevsky District =

Safakulevsky District Сафакулевский район (Russian)
- District
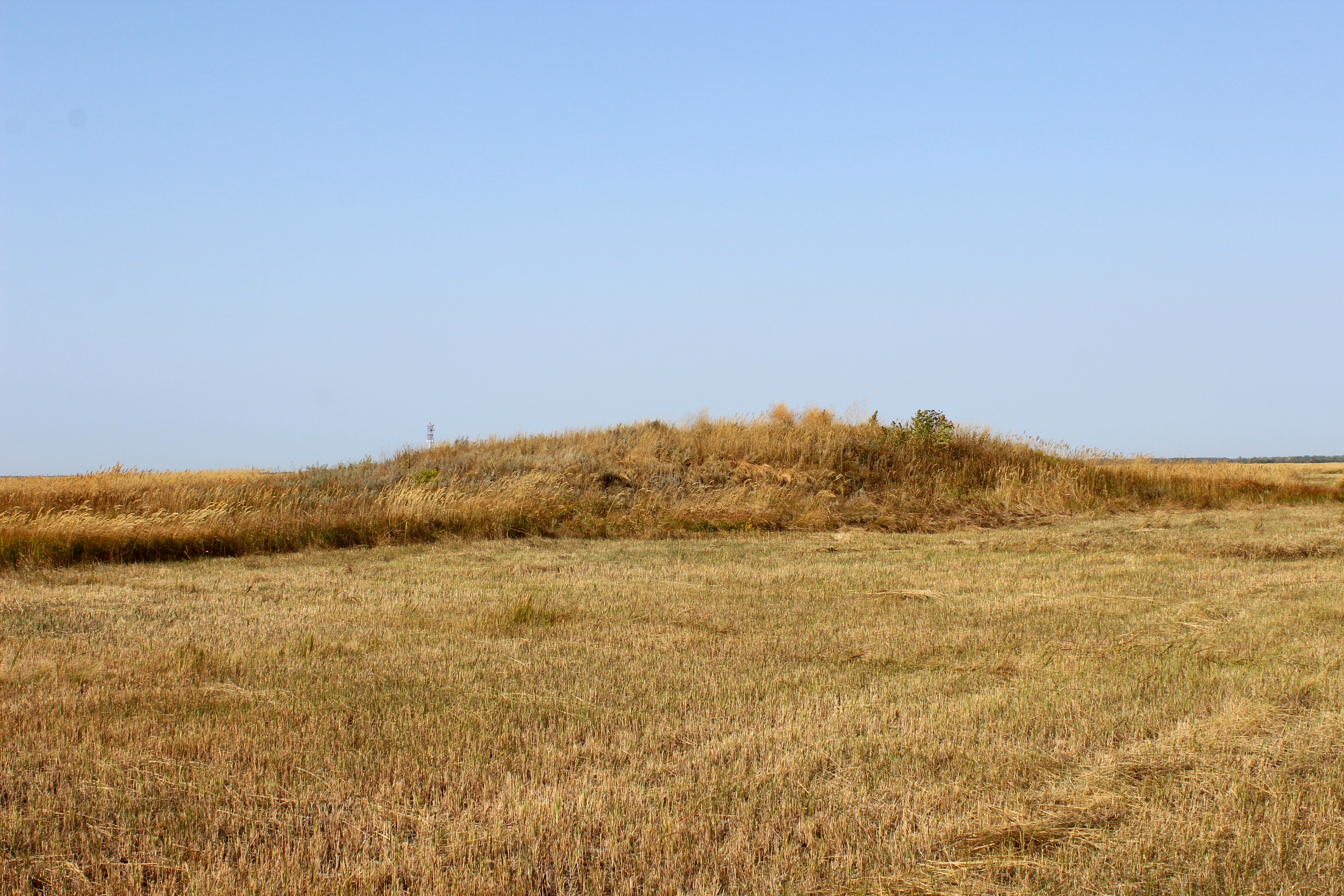
- Archaeological mound, Safakulevsky District

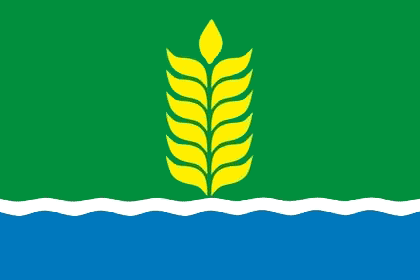
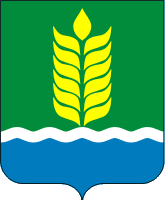
- Flag Coat of arms
- Location of Safakulevsky District in Kurgan Oblast
- Coordinates: 54°59′26″N 62°32′35″E
- Country: Russia
- Federal subject: Kurgan Oblast
- Established: 17 December 1940
- Administrative center: Safakulevo

Area
  - Total: 2,280 km^{2} (880 sq mi)

Population (2010 Census)
  - Total: 13,120
  - Density: 5.75/km^{2} (14.9/sq mi)
  - Urban: 0%
  - Rural: 100%

Administrative structure
  - Administrative divisions: 13 selsoviet
  - Inhabited localities: 33 rural localities

Municipal structure
  - Municipally incorporated as: Safakulevsky Municipal District
  - Municipal divisions: 0 urban settlements, 13 rural settlements
- Time zone: UTC+5 (MSK+2)
- OKTMO ID: 37632000
- Website: http://adm.safakulevo.ru/

Safakulevsky District (Russian: Сафакулевский райо́н) is an administrative and municipal district (raion), one of the twenty-four in Kurgan Oblast, Russia. It is located in the southwest of the oblast. The area of the district is 2,280 square kilometers (880 sq mi). Its administrative center is the rural locality (a selo) of Safakulevo. Population: 13,120 (2010 census); 16,957 (2002 Census); 19,627 (1989 Soviet census). The population of Safakulevo accounts for 27.7% of the district's total population.
