= Chastoozersky District =

Chastoozersky District Частоозерский район (Russian)
- District
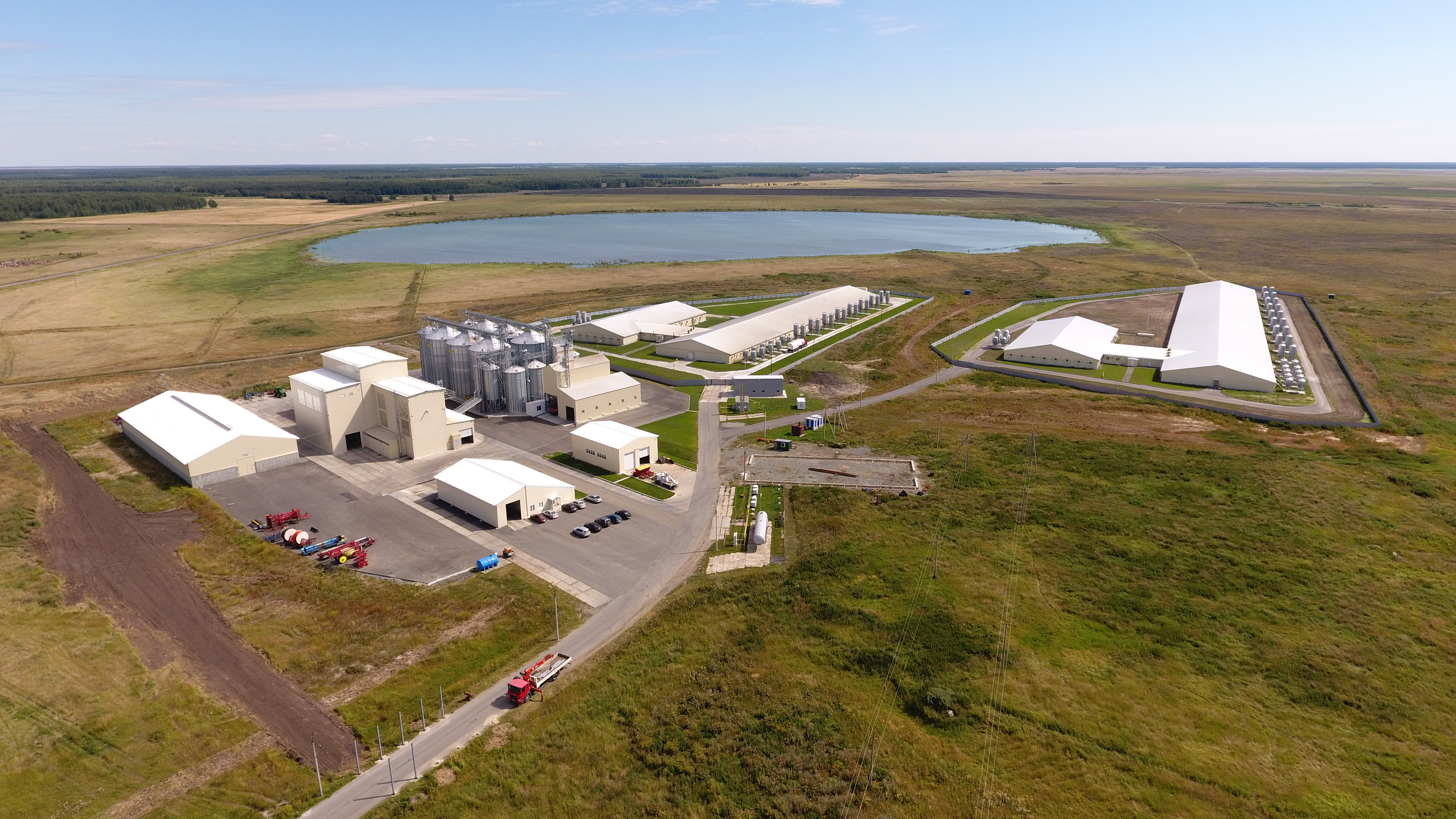

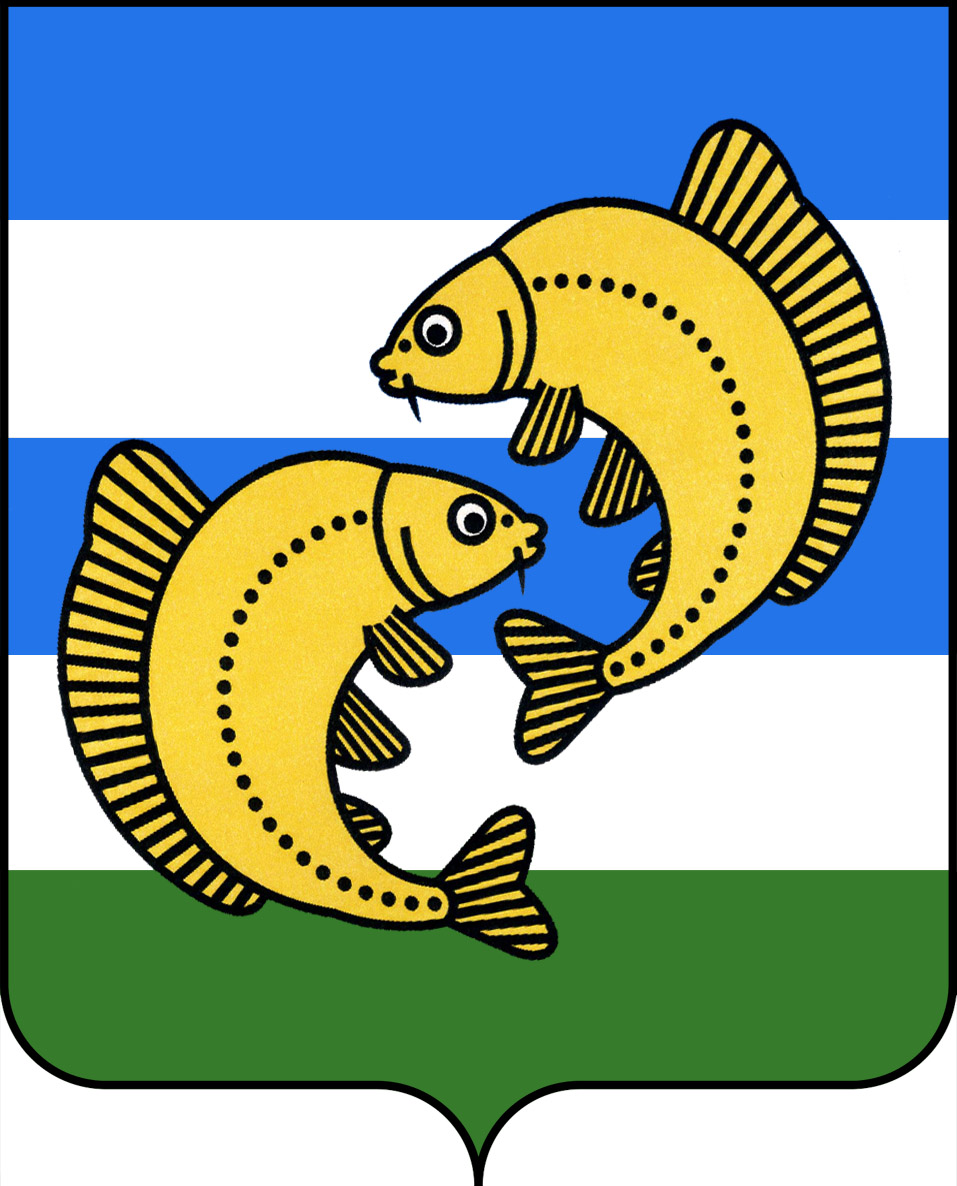
- Coat of arms
- Location of Chastoozersky District in Kurgan Oblast
- Coordinates: 55°33′58″N 67°54′35″E
- Country: Russia
- Federal subject: Kurgan Oblast
- Established: 1924
- Administrative center: Chastoozerye

Area
  - Total: 1,926 km^{2} (744 sq mi)

Population (2010 Census)
  - Total: 5,924
  - Density: 3.076/km^{2} (7.966/sq mi)
  - Urban: 0%
  - Rural: 100%

Administrative structure
  - Administrative divisions: 9 selsoviet
  - Inhabited localities: 22 rural localities

Municipal structure
  - Municipally incorporated as: Chastoozersky Municipal District
  - Municipal divisions: 0 urban settlements, 9 rural settlements
- Time zone: UTC+5 (MSK+2)
- OKTMO ID: 37636000
- Website: http://chastadm.ucoz.ru/

Chastoozersky District (Russian: Частоозерский райо́н) is an administrative and municipal district (raion), one of the twenty-four in Kurgan Oblast, Russia. It is located in the east of the oblast. The area of the district is 1,926 square kilometers (744 sq mi). Its administrative center is the rural locality (a selo) of Chastoozerye. Population: 5,924 (2010 census); 7,762 (2002 Census); 9,178 (1989 Soviet census). The population of Chastoozerye accounts for 46.4% of the district's total population.
