= Antipayuta =

Antipayuta Антипаюта
- Settlement
- Location within Yamalo-Nenets Autonomous Okrug Location within Russia
- Coordinates: 69°06′N 76°52′E
- Country: Russia
- Region: Yamalo-Nenets Autonomous Okrug
- District: Tazovsky District
- Time zone: UTC+5:00 (YEKT)

Antipayuta (Russian: Антипаюта) is a rural locality (a settlement) and the administrative center of Antipayuta Rural Settlement of Tasovsky District, Yamalo-Nenets Autonomous Okrug, Russia. The population is 2,685 as of 2017.

== Climate ==
Antipayuta has a subarctic climate (Köppen climate classification Dfc) with cold, long winters and short, cool summers.

Climate data for Antipayuta (1991–2020, extremes 1959–present)
Month	Jan	Feb	Mar	Apr	May	Jun	Jul	Aug	Sep	Oct	Nov	Dec	Year
Record high °C (°F)	−0.2 (31.6)	0.9 (33.6)	1.7 (35.1)	3.6 (38.5)	16.3 (61.3)	30.0 (86.0)	32.4 (90.3)	26.4 (79.5)	20.8 (69.4)	10.2 (50.4)	1.5 (34.7)	0.5 (32.9)	32.4 (90.3)
Mean daily maximum °C (°F)	−21.4 (−6.5)	−21.0 (−5.8)	−14.8 (5.4)	−8.9 (16.0)	−2.0 (28.4)	9.7 (49.5)	17.2 (63.0)	14.0 (57.2)	7.1 (44.8)	−3.0 (26.6)	−13.7 (7.3)	−18.7 (−1.7)	−4.6 (23.7)
Daily mean °C (°F)	−25.5 (−13.9)	−25.1 (−13.2)	−19.5 (−3.1)	−13.6 (7.5)	−4.9 (23.2)	5.9 (42.6)	12.7 (54.9)	10.4 (50.7)	4.3 (39.7)	−5.6 (21.9)	−17.4 (0.7)	−22.5 (−8.5)	−8.4 (16.9)
Mean daily minimum °C (°F)	−29.7 (−21.5)	−29.4 (−20.9)	−24.1 (−11.4)	−18.5 (−1.3)	−8.0 (17.6)	2.8 (37.0)	8.7 (47.7)	7.1 (44.8)	1.8 (35.2)	−8.5 (16.7)	−21.4 (−6.5)	−26.5 (−15.7)	−12.1 (10.2)
Record low °C (°F)	−51.1 (−60.0)	−51.1 (−60.0)	−53.0 (−63.4)	−44.9 (−48.8)	−30.0 (−22.0)	−15.5 (4.1)	−1.1 (30.0)	−2.7 (27.1)	−12.2 (10.0)	−37.1 (−34.8)	−44.2 (−47.6)	−50.9 (−59.6)	−53.0 (−63.4)
Average precipitation mm (inches)	15 (0.6)	15 (0.6)	17 (0.7)	14 (0.6)	20 (0.8)	28 (1.1)	44 (1.7)	50 (2.0)	32 (1.3)	27 (1.1)	19 (0.7)	18 (0.7)	299 (11.8)
Source: Pogoda.ru.net

== Transport ==
Antipayuta has an airport. Yamal operates flights with the district center Tazovsky, as well with Nakhodka and Gyda. During the navigable period (mid-July to late September) there is a ferry line between Salekhard and Antipayuta every five days
