= Pokrovka, Bezenchuksky District, Samara Oblast =

Village in Bezenchuksky District, Samara Oblast, Russia

Coordinates: 52°53′58″N 49°37′41″E

Pokrovka (Russian: Покровка) is a rural locality (a selo) in the Bezenchuksky District in the Samara Oblast, Russia. Population: 305 (2010 census);
