= Pestravsky District =

Pestravsky District Пестравский район
- District
- Flag Coat of arms
- Location of Pestravsky District in Samara Oblast
- Coordinates: 52°24′N 49°57′E
- Country: Russia
- Federal subject: Samara Oblast
- Established: 25 January 1935
- Administrative center: Pestravka

Area
  - Total: 1,960 km^{2} (760 sq mi)

Population (2010 Census)
  - Total: 17,779
  - Density: 9.07/km^{2} (23.5/sq mi)
  - Urban: 0%
  - Rural: 100%

Administrative structure
  - Inhabited localities: 27 rural localities

Municipal structure
  - Municipally incorporated as: Pestravsky Municipal District
  - Municipal divisions: 0 urban settlements, 8 rural settlements
- Time zone: UTC+4 (MSK+1)
- OKTMO ID: 36632000
- Website: http://www.pestravsky.ru/

Pestravsky District (Russian: Пестра́вский райо́н) is an administrative and municipal district (raion), one of the twenty-seven in Samara Oblast, Russia. It is located in the southwest of the oblast. The area of the district is 1,960 square kilometers (760 sq mi). Its administrative center is the rural locality (a selo) of Pestravka. Population: 17,779 (2010 Census); 18,340 (2002 Census); 18,815 (1989 Soviet census). The population of Pestravka accounts for 37.0% of the district's total population.
