= Chastoozerye =

Rural locality in Kurgan Oblast, Russia

Coordinates: 55°34′03″N 67°54′20″E

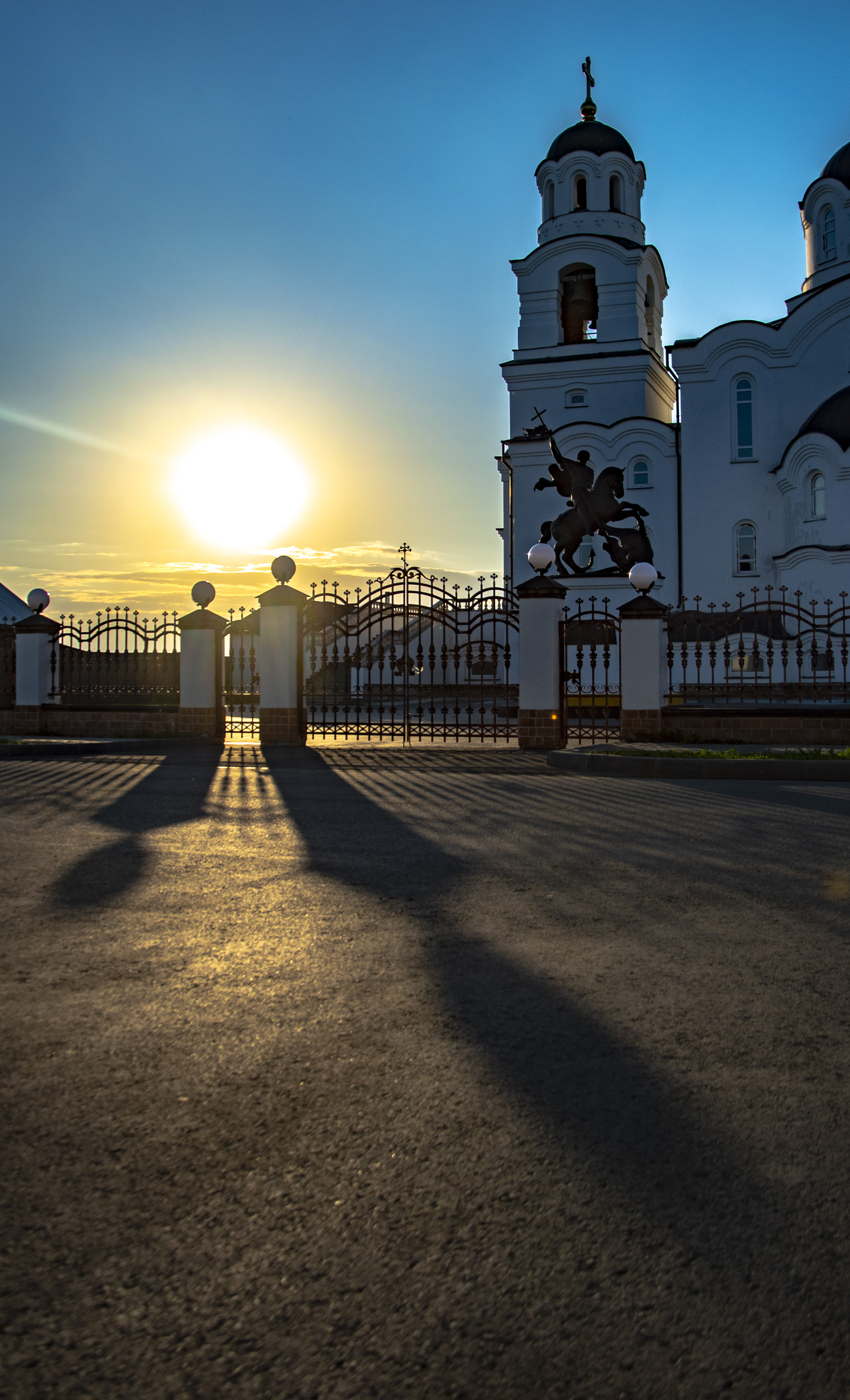

Chastoozerye (Russian: Частоозерье) is a rural locality (a selo) and the administrative center of Chastoozersky District, Kurgan Oblast, Russia. Population: 2,749 (2010 census); 2,843 (2002 census); 3,013 (1989 Soviet census).
