= Golokhvastovo, Novofyodorovskoye Settlement, Troitsky Administrative Okrug, Moscow =

Golokhvastovo Голохвастово
- Village
- Location within Moscow Location within Russia
- Coordinates: 55°23′20″N 36°56′43″E
- Country: Russia
- Region: Moscow
- District: Troitsky Administrative Okrug
- Time zone: UTC+03:00

Golokhvastovo (Russian: Голохвастово) is a village in Novofyodorovskoye Settlement, Troitsky Administrative Okrug of the federal city of Moscow, Russia. Population: 0 (2010 census); 1 (2002 census);
