= Zverinogolovsky District =

Zverinogolovsky District Звериноголовский район (Russian)
- District
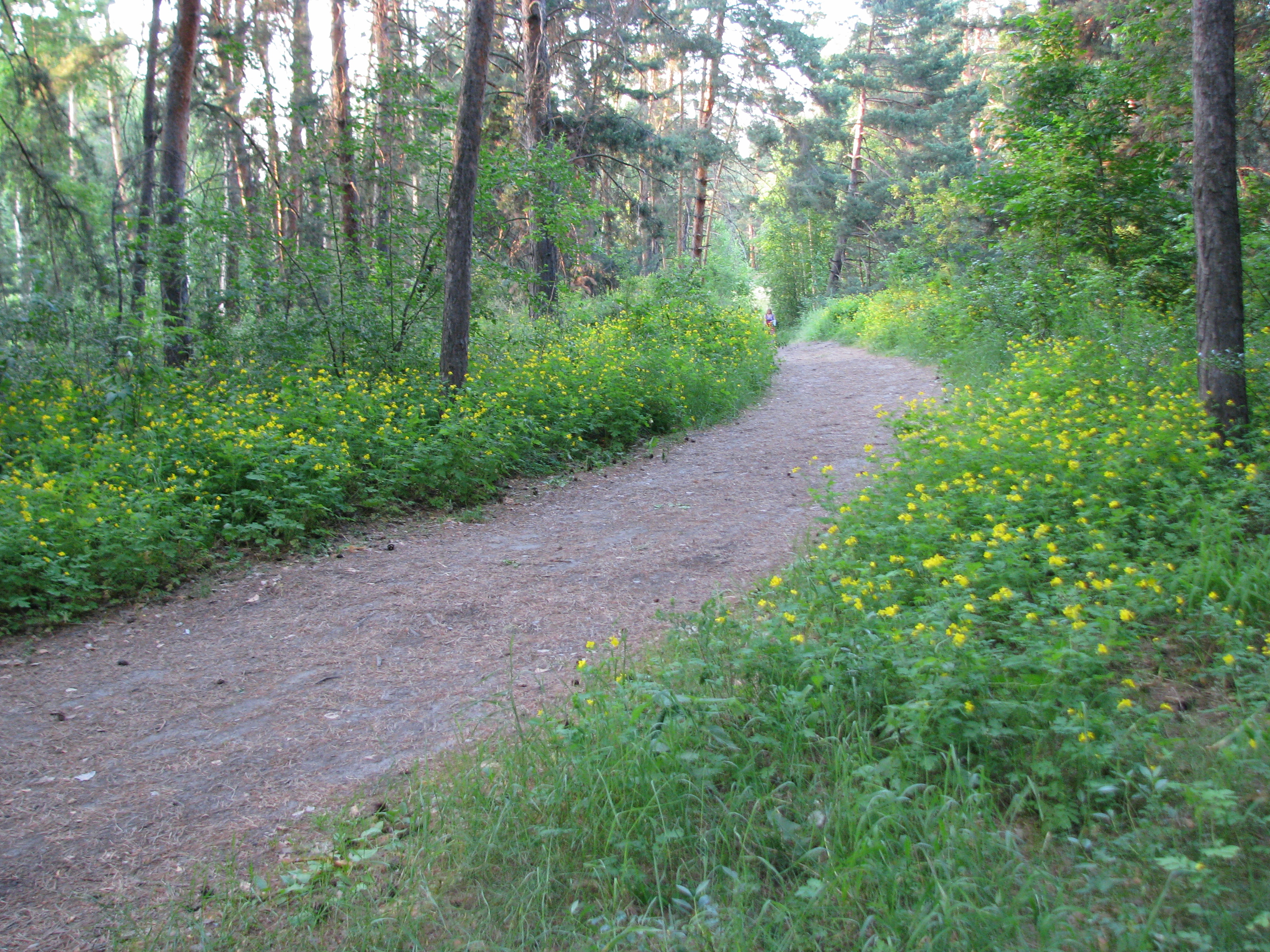
- Pine grove in Zverinogolovsky District

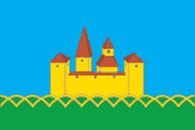
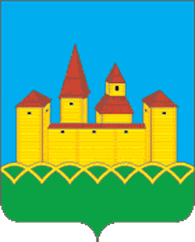
- Flag Coat of arms
- Location of Zverinogolovsky District in Kurgan Oblast
- Coordinates: 54°30′N 64°54′E
- Country: Russia
- Federal subject: Kurgan Oblast
- Established: 1992
- Administrative center: Zverinogolovskoye

Area
  - Total: 1,400 km^{2} (540 sq mi)

Population (2010 Census)
  - Total: 9,518
  - Density: 6.8/km^{2} (18/sq mi)
  - Urban: 0%
  - Rural: 100%

Administrative structure
  - Administrative divisions: 8 selsoviet
  - Inhabited localities: 18 rural localities

Municipal structure
  - Municipally incorporated as: Zverinogolovsky Municipal District
  - Municipal divisions: 0 urban settlements, 8 rural settlements
- Time zone: UTC+5 (MSK+2)
- OKTMO ID: 37609000
- Website: http://zverinogolovskoe.ru/

Zverinogolovsky District (Russian: Звериноголовский райо́н) is an administrative and municipal district (raion), one of the twenty-four in Kurgan Oblast, Russia. It is located in the south of the oblast. The area of the district is 1,400 square kilometers (540 sq mi). Its administrative center is the rural locality (a selo) of Zverinogolovskoye. Population: 9,518 (2010 census); 11,755 (2002 Census). The population of Zverinogolovskoye accounts for 42.7% of the district's total population.

== History ==
The district was established in 1992.
