= Khvorostyansky District =

Khvorostyansky District Хворостянский район
- District
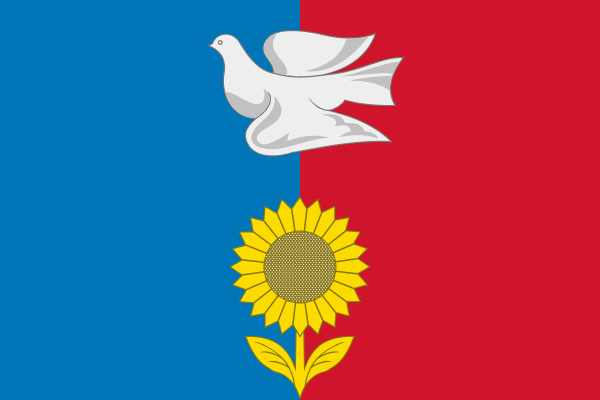
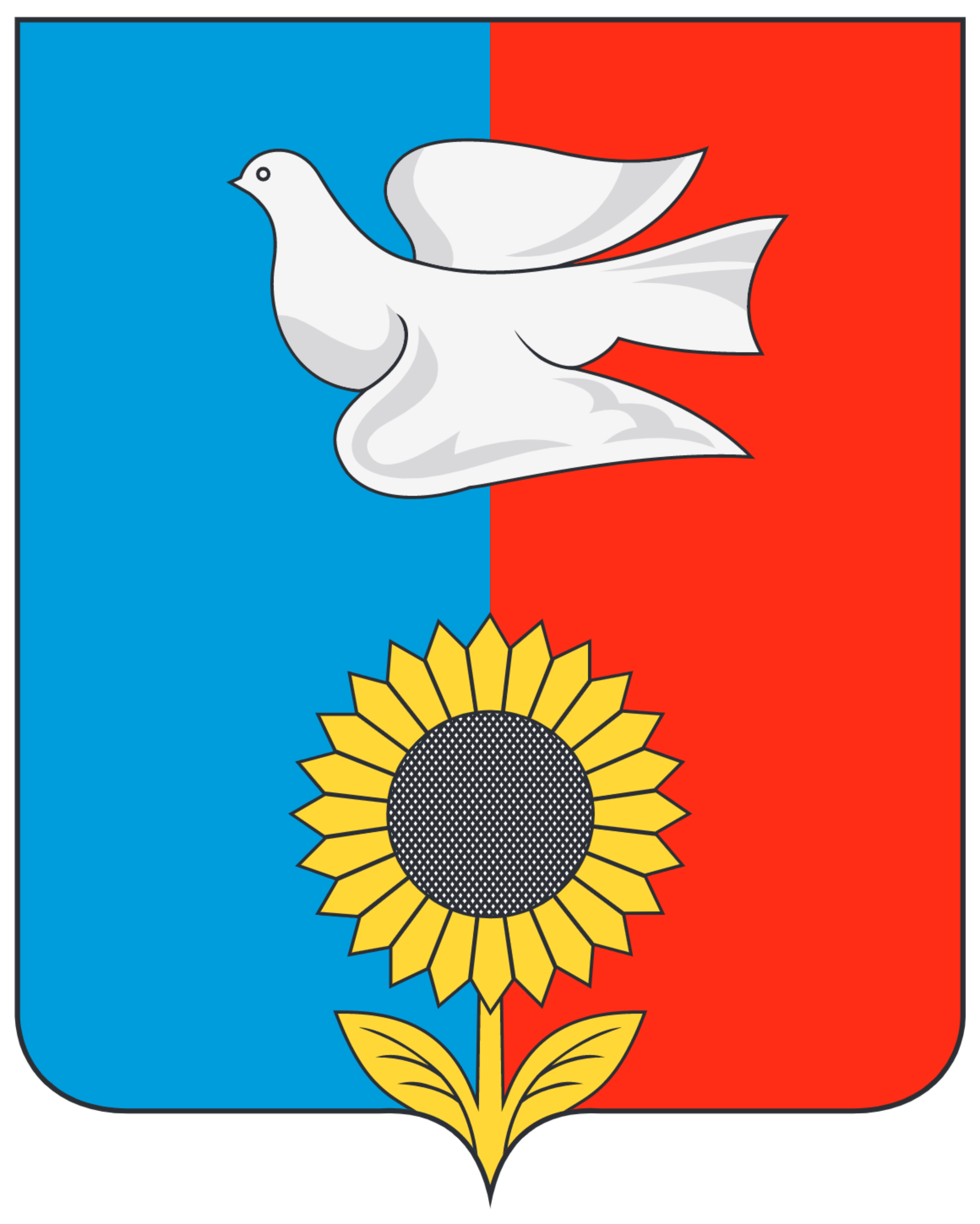
- Flag Coat of arms
- Location of Khvorostyansky District in Samara Oblast
- Coordinates: 52°36′39″N 48°57′37″E
- Country: Russia
- Federal subject: Samara Oblast
- Established: 25 January 1935
- Administrative center: Khvorostyanka

Area
  - Total: 1,845 km^{2} (712 sq mi)

Population (2010 Census)
  - Total: 16,302
  - Density: 8.836/km^{2} (22.88/sq mi)
  - Urban: 0%
  - Rural: 100%

Administrative structure
  - Inhabited localities: 27 rural localities

Municipal structure
  - Municipally incorporated as: Khvorostyansky Municipal District
  - Municipal divisions: 0 urban settlements, 11 rural settlements
- Time zone: UTC+4 (MSK+1)
- OKTMO ID: 36644000
- Website: http://hvorostyanka.ru/

Khvorostyansky District (Russian: Хворостя́нский райо́н) is an administrative and municipal district (raion), one of the twenty-seven in Samara Oblast, Russia. It is located in the west of the oblast. The area of the district is 2,534 square kilometers (978 sq mi). Its administrative center is the rural locality (a selo) of Khvorostyanka. Population: 16,302 (2010 Census); 16,098 (2002 Census); 14,634 (1989 Soviet census). The population of Khvorostyanka accounts for 31.7% of the district's total population.
