= Pritobolny District =

Pritobolny District Притобольный район (Russian)
- District
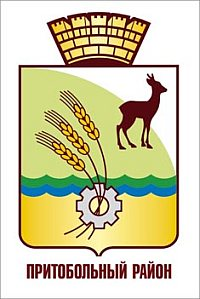
- Coat of arms
- Location of Pritobolny District in Kurgan Oblast
- Coordinates: 54°54′32″N 65°05′04″E
- Country: Russia
- Federal subject: Kurgan Oblast
- Established: 1926
- Administrative center: Glyadyanskoye

Area
  - Total: 2,302 km^{2} (889 sq mi)

Population (2010 Census)
  - Total: 14,592
  - Density: 6.339/km^{2} (16.42/sq mi)
  - Urban: 0%
  - Rural: 100%

Administrative structure
  - Administrative divisions: 14 selsoviet
  - Inhabited localities: 37 rural localities

Municipal structure
  - Municipally incorporated as: Pritobolny Municipal District
  - Municipal divisions: 0 urban settlements, 14 rural settlements
- Time zone: UTC+5 (MSK+2)
- OKTMO ID: 37630000
- Website: http://admpritobol.ru/

Pritobolny District (Russian: Притобольный райо́н) is an administrative and municipal district (raion), one of the twenty-four in Kurgan Oblast, Russia. It is located in the south of the oblast. The area of the district is 2,302 square kilometers (889 sq mi). Its administrative center is the rural locality (a selo) of Glyadyanskoye. Population: 14,592 (2010 census); 17,596 (2002 Census); 26,638 (1989 Soviet census). The population of Glyadyanskoye accounts for 27.2% of the district's total population.
