= Zverinogolovskoye =

Rural locality in Kurgan Oblast, Russia

Coordinates: 54°27′29″N 64°51′26″E

Zverinogolovskoye (Russian: Звериноголовское) is a rural locality (a selo) and the administrative center of Zverinogolovsky District, Kurgan Oblast, Russia. Population: 4,060 (2010 census); 4,502 (2002 census);
