= Dombarovsky District =

Dombarovsky District Домбаровский район (Russian)
- District
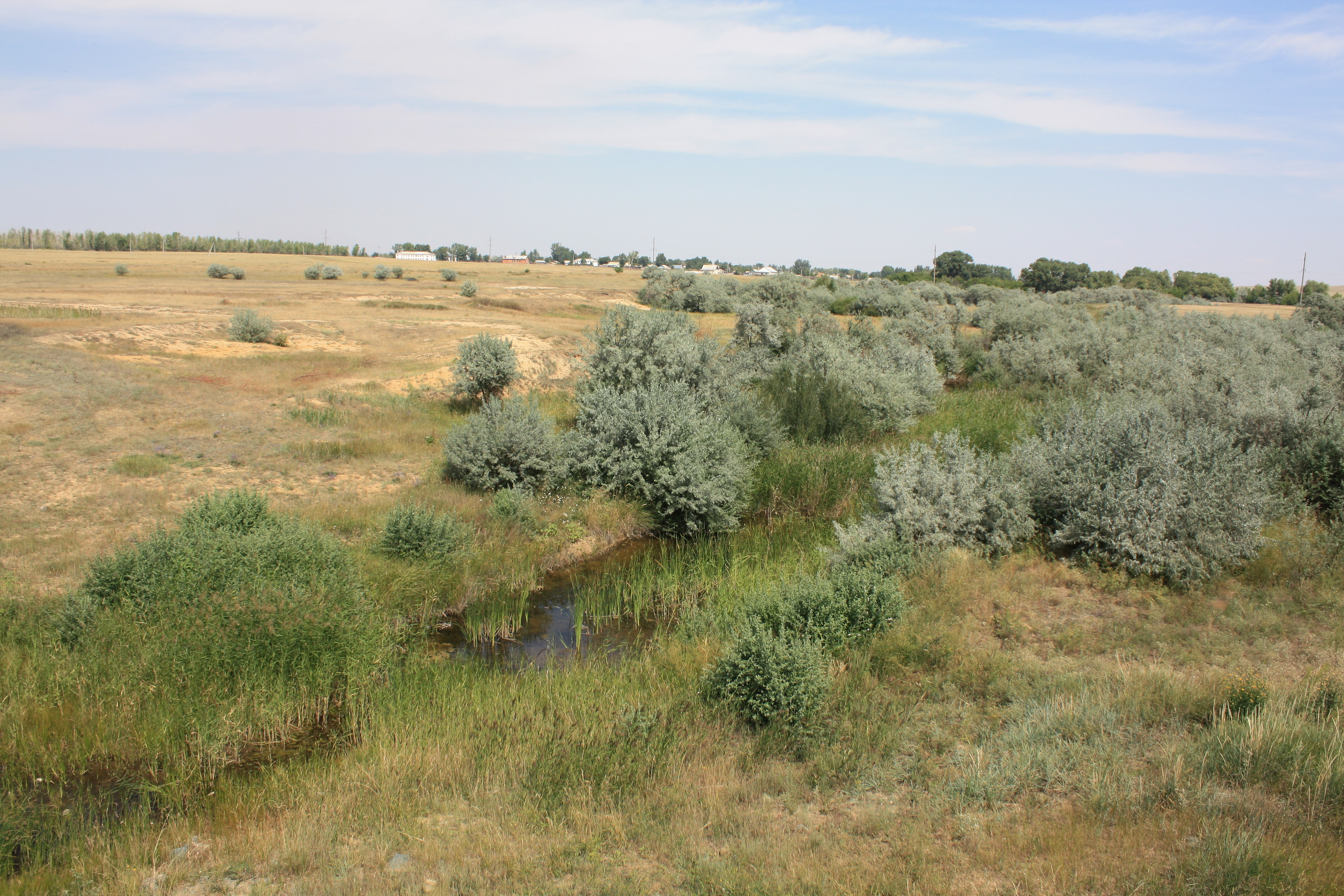
- River Domarovka, and village of same name, Dombarovsky District

- Flag Coat of arms
- Location of Dombarovsky District in Orenburg Oblast
- Coordinates: 50°45′59″N 59°32′40″E
- Country: Russia
- Federal subject: Orenburg Oblast
- Established: 30 May 1927
- Administrative center: Dombarovsky

Area
  - Total: 3,600 km^{2} (1,400 sq mi)

Population (2010 Census)
  - Total: 15,994
  - Density: 4.4/km^{2} (12/sq mi)
  - Urban: 0%
  - Rural: 100%

Administrative structure
  - Administrative divisions: 6 Selsoviets, 1 Settlement councils
  - Inhabited localities: 24 rural localities

Municipal structure
  - Municipally incorporated as: Dombarovsky Municipal District
  - Municipal divisions: 0 urban settlements, 6 rural settlements
- Time zone: UTC+5 (MSK+2)
- OKTMO ID: 53617000
- Website: http://mo-dm.orb.ru/

Dombarovsky District (Russian: Домбаровский райо́н; Kazakh: Дамбар ауданы, Dambar aýdany) is an administrative and municipal district (raion), one of the thirty-five in Orenburg Oblast, Russia. It is located in the southeast of the oblast.

The area of the district is 3,600 square kilometers (1,400 sq mi). Its administrative center is the rural locality of Dombarovsky. Its population at the time of the 2010 census was 15,994, down from 19,188 in the 2002 census and 20,016 in the 1989 Soviet census. The population of the administrative center accounts for 53.9% of the total district's population.
