= Almenevo, Kurgan Oblast =

Rural locality in Russia

Almenevo Альменево
- Selo
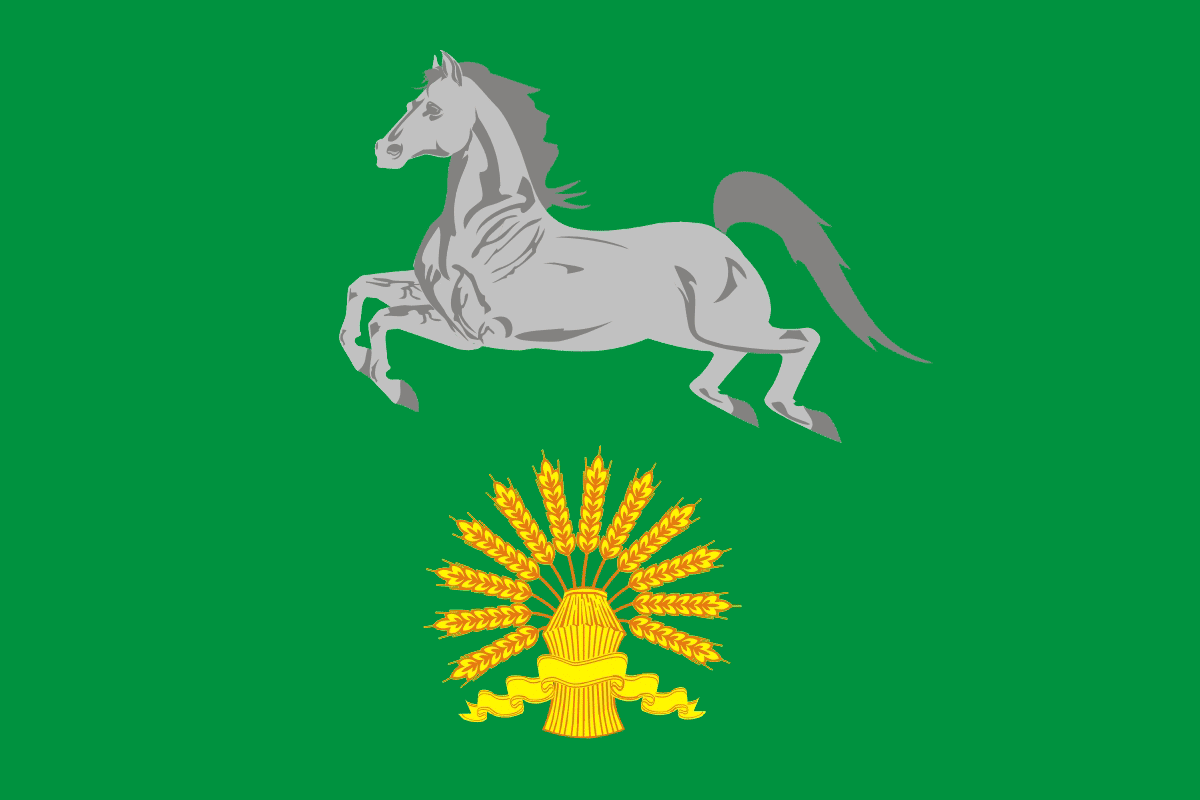
- Flag
- Interactive map of Almenevo
- Location of Almenevo Almenevo (Kurgan Oblast)
- Coordinates: 54°56′33″N 63°34′15″E
- Country: Russia
- Federal subject: Kurgan Oblast
- Administrative district: Almenevsky District
- SettlementSelsoviet: Almenevo Settlement
- Founded: 1586
- Elevation: 172 m (564 ft)

Population (2010 Census)
  - Total: 4,310
  - Estimate (2021): 3,664 (−15%)

Administrative status
  - Capital of: Almenevsky District, Almenevo Settlement

Municipal status
  - Municipal district: Almenevsky Municipal District
  - Rural settlement: Almenevsky Selsoviet Rural Settlement
  - Capital of: Almenevsky Municipal District, Almenevsky Selsoviet Rural Settlement
- Time zone: UTC+5 (MSK+2)
- Postal code: 641130
- OKTMO ID: 37602404101

Almenevo (Russian: Альменево) is a rural locality (a selo) and the administrative center of Almenevsky District of Kurgan Oblast, Russia. Population: 4,310 (2010 census); 4,559 (2002 census); 5,013 (1989 Soviet census).
