= Dombarovsky (rural locality) =

Rural locality in Orenburg Oblast, Russia

Coordinates: 50°45′18″N 59°31′59″E

Dombarovsky (Russian: Домбаровский) is a rural locality (a settlement) and the administrative center of Dombarovsky District, Orenburg Oblast, Russia. Its population has decreased in recent years: 8,614 (2010 census); 9,609 (2002 census); 9,419 (1989 Soviet census).

== Climate ==
Climate data for Dombarovsky (extremes 1937-present)
Month	Jan	Feb	Mar	Apr	May	Jun	Jul	Aug	Sep	Oct	Nov	Dec	Year
Record high °C (°F)	3.0 (37.4)	7.7 (45.9)	22.2 (72.0)	29.6 (85.3)	36.4 (97.5)	43.0 (109.4)	40.0 (104.0)	41.3 (106.3)	36.9 (98.4)	27.9 (82.2)	15.3 (59.5)	10.1 (50.2)	43.0 (109.4)
Mean daily maximum °C (°F)	−9.9 (14.2)	−8.8 (16.2)	−1.6 (29.1)	12.5 (54.5)	21.9 (71.4)	27.4 (81.3)	28.7 (83.7)	27.6 (81.7)	20.8 (69.4)	11.6 (52.9)	−0.1 (31.8)	−7.3 (18.9)	10.2 (50.4)
Daily mean °C (°F)	−14.1 (6.6)	−13.5 (7.7)	−6.3 (20.7)	6.4 (43.5)	15.0 (59.0)	20.4 (68.7)	22.0 (71.6)	20.5 (68.9)	13.6 (56.5)	5.4 (41.7)	−4.2 (24.4)	−11.4 (11.5)	4.5 (40.1)
Mean daily minimum °C (°F)	−18.3 (−0.9)	−17.9 (−0.2)	−10.7 (12.7)	1.0 (33.8)	8.0 (46.4)	13.2 (55.8)	15.2 (59.4)	13.5 (56.3)	7.1 (44.8)	0.4 (32.7)	−7.6 (18.3)	−15.4 (4.3)	−1.0 (30.3)
Record low °C (°F)	−42.2 (−44.0)	−39.3 (−38.7)	−33.5 (−28.3)	−22.2 (−8.0)	−7.5 (18.5)	0.6 (33.1)	5.9 (42.6)	1.0 (33.8)	−7.4 (18.7)	−23.8 (−10.8)	−33.7 (−28.7)	−39.6 (−39.3)	−42.2 (−44.0)
Average precipitation mm (inches)	21.4 (0.84)	20.2 (0.80)	24.5 (0.96)	24.4 (0.96)	35.3 (1.39)	27.4 (1.08)	36.2 (1.43)	23.0 (0.91)	17.0 (0.67)	29.0 (1.14)	24.1 (0.95)	27.9 (1.10)	310.4 (12.23)
Source: pogoda.ru.net
