= Almenevsky District =

Almenevsky District Альменевский район
- District
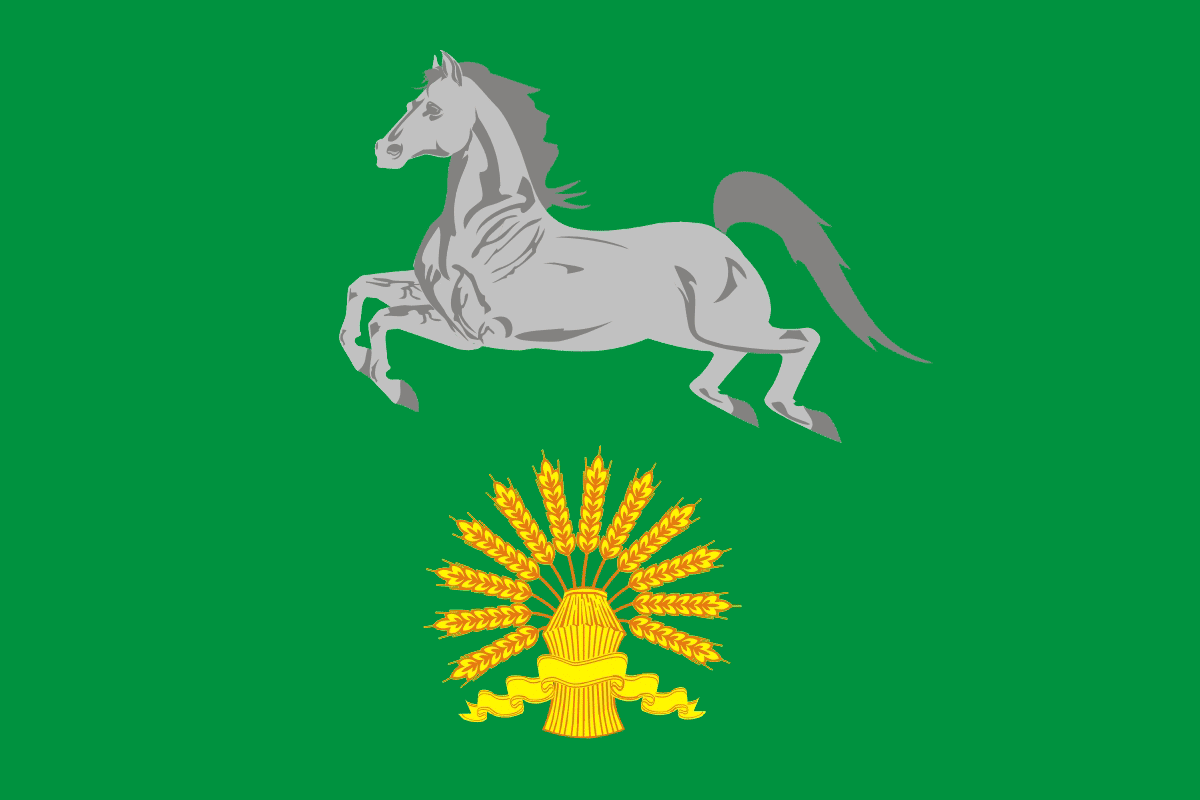
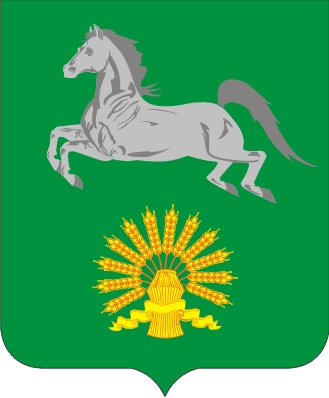
- Flag Coat of arms
- Location of Almenevsky District in Kurgan Oblast
- Coordinates: 54°56′36″N 63°34′44″E
- Country: Russia
- Federal subject: Kurgan Oblast
- Established: 12 January 1965
- Administrative center: Almenevo

Area
  - Total: 2,510 km^{2} (970 sq mi)

Population (2010 Census)
  - Total: 12,412
  - Density: 4.95/km^{2} (12.8/sq mi)
  - Urban: 0%
  - Rural: 100%

Administrative structure
  - Administrative divisions: 12 selsoviet
  - Inhabited localities: 33 rural localities

Municipal structure
  - Municipally incorporated as: Almenevsky Municipal District
  - Municipal divisions: 0 urban settlements, 12 rural settlements
- Time zone: UTC+5 (MSK+2)
- OKTMO ID: 37602000
- Website: http://admalmenevo.ru/

Almenevsky District (Russian: Альменевский райо́н) is an administrative and municipal district (raion), one of the twenty-four in Kurgan Oblast, Russia. It is located in the southwest of the oblast. The area of the district is 2,510 square kilometers (970 sq mi). Its administrative center is the rural locality (a selo) of Almenevo. Population: 12,412 (2010 Census); 15,240 (2002 Census); 18,983 (1989 Soviet census). The population of Almenevo accounts for 34.7% of the district's total population.
