= Perevolotsky (rural locality) =

Place in Orenburg Oblast, Russia

Coordinates: 51°52′34″N 54°11′26″E

Perevolotsky (Russian: Переволоцкий) is a rural locality (a settlement) and the administrative center of Perevolotsky District, Orenburg Oblast, Russia. Population: 9,598 (2010 census); 9,721 (2002 census); 10,279 (1989 Soviet census).
