= Perevolotsky District =

Perevolotsky District Переволоцкий район (Russian)
- District
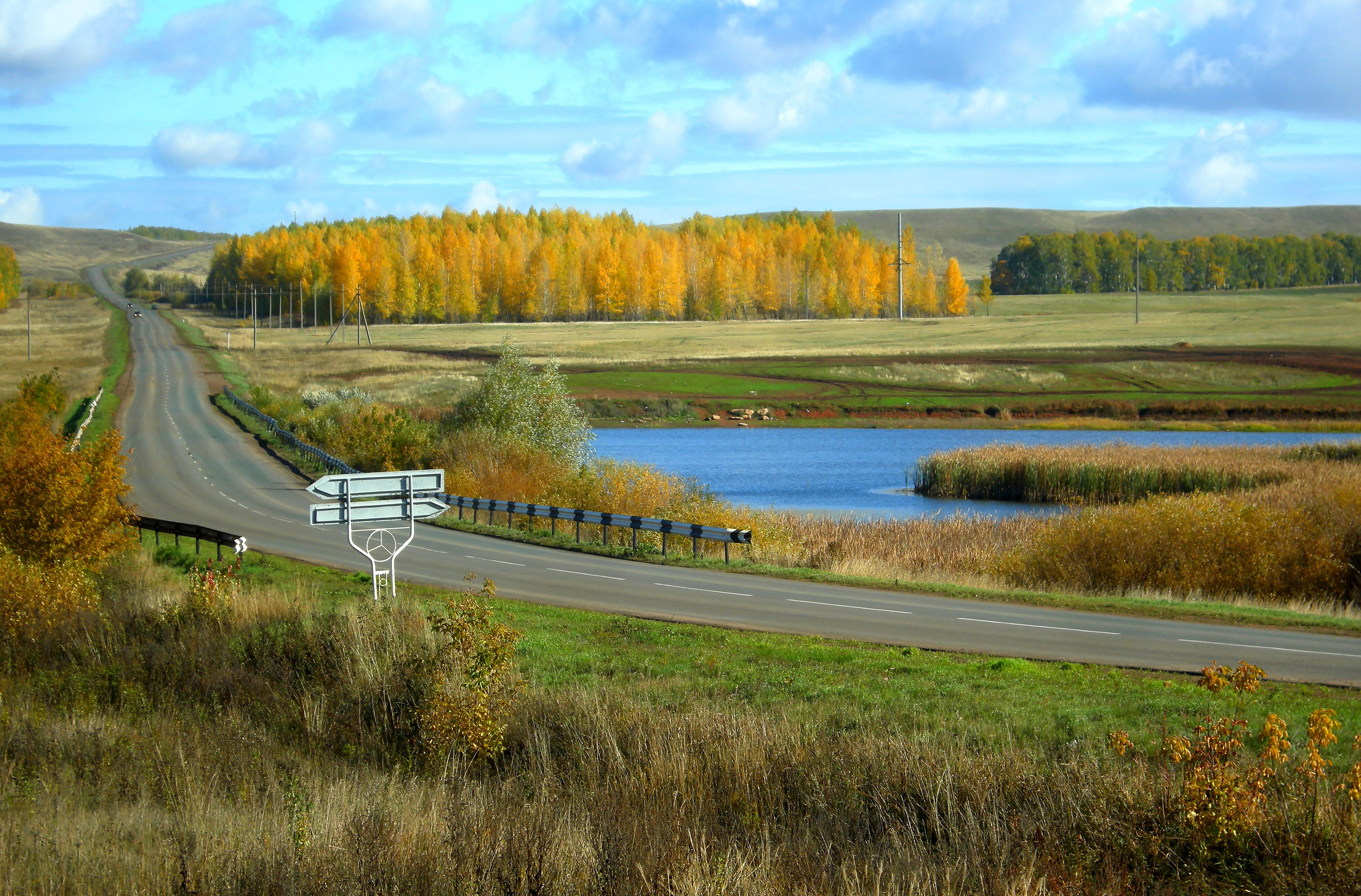
- Route near the village Vlasovka, Perevolotsky District

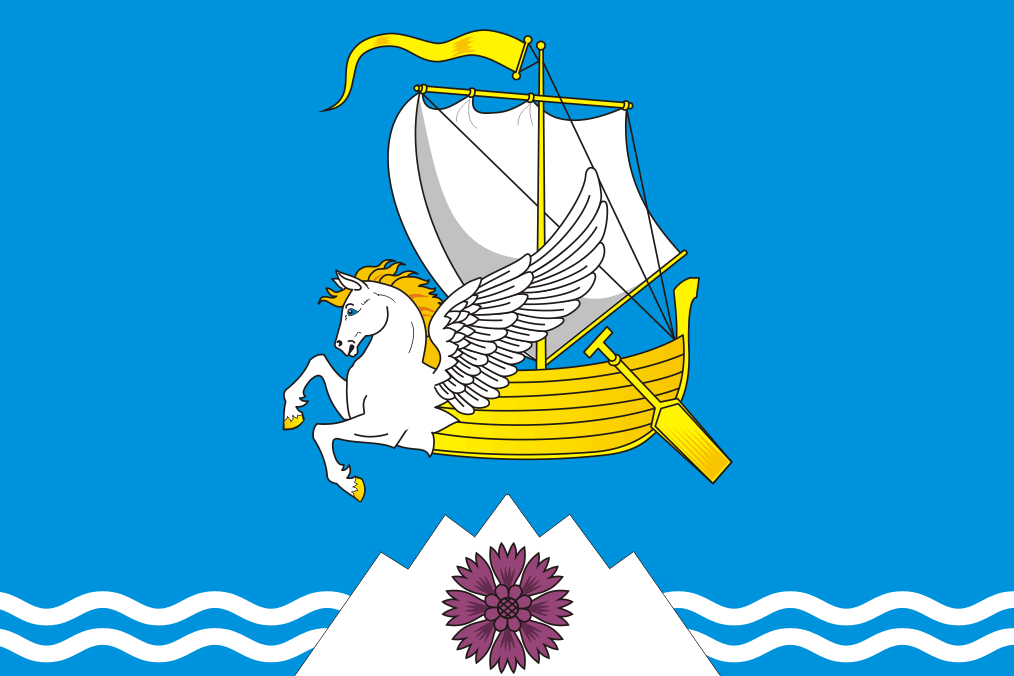
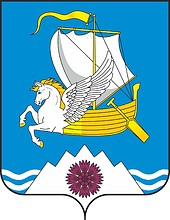
- Flag Coat of arms
- Location of Perevolotsky District in Orenburg Oblast
- Coordinates: 51°52′43″N 54°11′18″E
- Country: Russia
- Federal subject: Orenburg Oblast
- Administrative center: Perevolotsky

Area
  - Total: 2,742 km^{2} (1,059 sq mi)

Population (2010 Census)
  - Total: 28,345
  - Density: 10.34/km^{2} (26.77/sq mi)
  - Urban: 0%
  - Rural: 100%

Administrative structure
  - Administrative divisions: 16 Selsoviets, 1 Settlement councils
  - Inhabited localities: 49 rural localities

Municipal structure
  - Municipally incorporated as: Perevolotsky Municipal District
  - Municipal divisions: 0 urban settlements, 17 rural settlements
- Time zone: UTC+5 (MSK+2)
- OKTMO ID: 53637000
- Website: http://www.perevolock.ru/

Perevolotsky District (Russian: Переволоцкий райо́н) is an administrative and municipal district (raion), one of the thirty-five in Orenburg Oblast, Russia. It is located in the center of the oblast. The area of the district is 2,742 square kilometers (1,059 sq mi). Its administrative center is the rural locality (a settlement) of Perevolotsky. Population: 28,345 (2010 Census); 29,088 (2002 census); 30,357 (1989 Soviet census). The population of the administrative center accounts for 33.9% of the total district's population.
