= Kurgan constituency =

Russian legislative constituency

Kurgan single-member constituency
- Constituency of the Russian State Duma

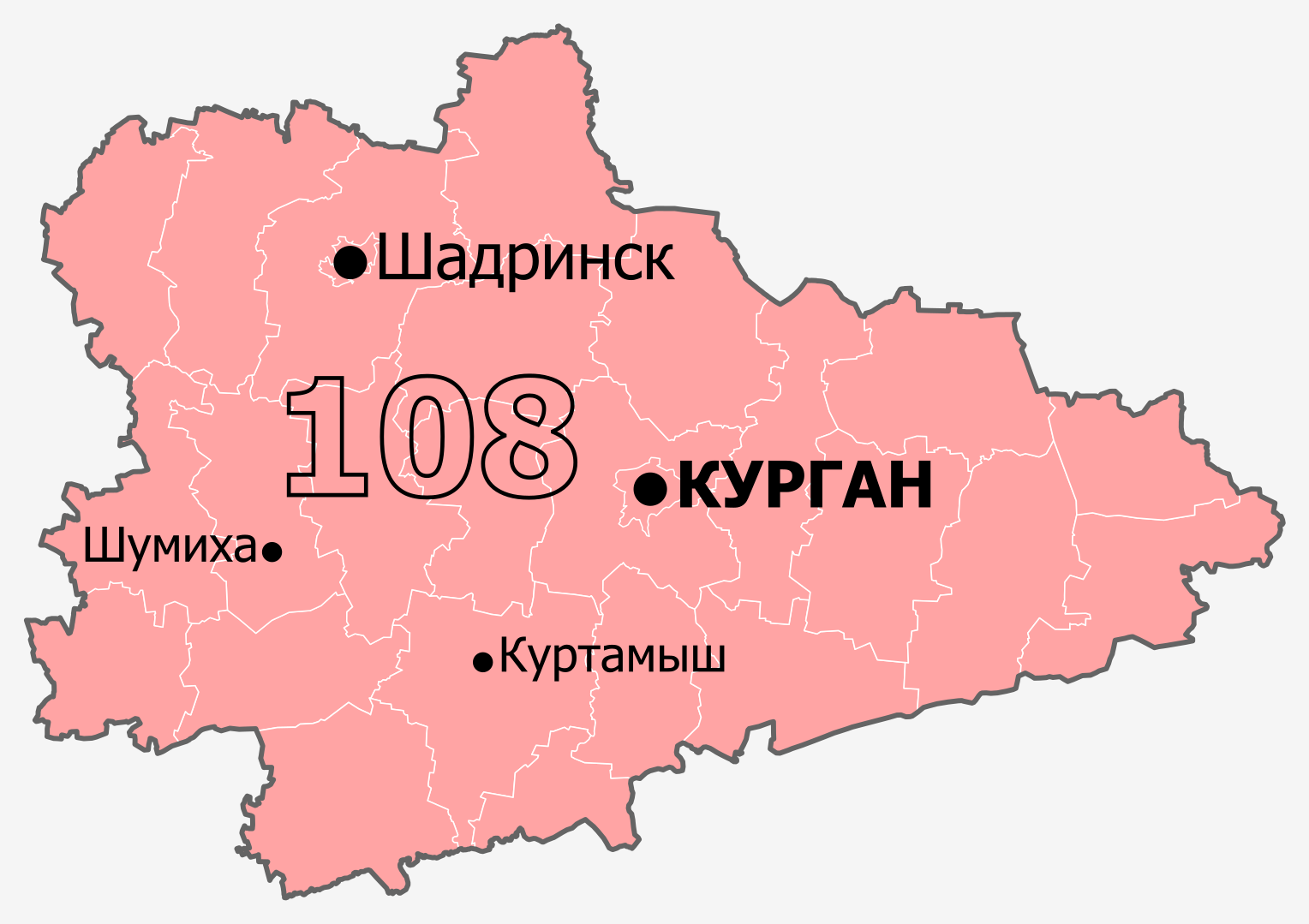
- Deputy: Aleksandr Iltyakov; United Russia
- Federal subject: Kurgan Oblast
- Districts: Almenevsky, Belozersky, Chastoozersky, Dalmatovsky, Kargapolsky, Kataysky, Ketovsky, Kurgan, Kurtamyshsky, Lebyazhyevsky, Makushinsky, Mishkinsky, Mokrousovsky, Petukhovsky, Polovinsky, Pritobolny, Safakulevsky, Shadrinsk, Shadrinsky, Shatrovsky, Shchuchansky, Shumikhinsky, Tselinny, Vargashinsky, Yurgamyshsky, Zverinogolovsky
- Voters: 622,853 (2026)

The Kurgan constituency (No.109 (Note: No.95 in 1995-2003, No.96 in 2003-2007, No.108 in 2016–2026)) is a Russian legislative constituency in Kurgan Oblast. The constituency encompasses the entire territory of Kurgan Oblast. However, in 1993–1995 Kurgan Oblast had two constituencies but lost one of them due to population decline.

The constituency has been represented since 2016 by United Russia deputy Aleksandr Iltyakov, four-term State Duma member and farmer.

== Boundaries ==
1993–1995:
Eastern constituency: Chastoozersky District, Ketovsky District, Kurgan, Lebyazhyevsky District, Makushinsky District, Mokrousovsky District, Petukhovsky District, Polovinsky District, Vargashinsky District
The constituency covered eastern corner of Kurgan Oblast, including the oblast capital Kurgan.

Western constituency: Almenevsky District, Belozersky District, Dalmatovsky District, Kargapolsky District, Kataysky District, Kurtamyshsky District, Mishkinsky District, Pritobolny District, Safakulevsky District, Shadrinsk, Shadrinsky District, Shatrovsky District, Shchuchansky District, Shumikhinsky District, Tselinny District, Yurgamyshsky District, Zverinogolovsky District
The constituency covered central and western Kurgan Oblast, including the city of Shadrinsk.

1995–2007, 2016–present: Almenevsky District, Belozersky District, Chastoozersky District, Dalmatovsky District, Kargapolsky District, Kataysky District, Ketovsky District, Kurgan, Kurtamyshsky District, Lebyazhyevsky District, Makushinsky District, Mishkinsky District, Mokrousovsky District, Petukhovsky District, Polovinsky District, Pritobolny District, Safakulevsky District, Shadrinsk, Shadrinsky District, Shatrovsky District, Shchuchansky District, Shumikhinsky District, Tselinny District, Vargashinsky District, Yurgamyshsky District, Zverinogolovsky District
The constituency has been covering the entirety of the Kurgan Oblast since 1995 redistricting, as the region lost a second constituency due to population loss.

== Members elected ==
Election	Member	Party
1993	Nikolay Bezborodov (Note: Eastern constituency)	Independent
1993	Gennady Kalistratov (Note: Western constituency)	Independent
1995	Nikolay Bezborodov	Independent
1999	Nikolay Bezborodov	Independent
2003	Nikolay Bezborodov	Independent
2007	Proportional representation - no election by constituency	
2011	Proportional representation - no election by constituency	
2016	Aleksandr Iltyakov	United Russia
2021	Aleksandr Iltyakov	United Russia
2026	Aleksandr Iltyakov	United Russia

== Election results ==
=== 1993 ===
Summary of the 12 December 1993 Russian legislative election in the Eastern constituency
Candidate	Party	Votes	%
Nikolay Bezborodov	Independent	96,103	44.09%
Sergey Bitkov	Choice of Russia	24,155	11.08%
Anatoly Drozdov	Independent	14,208	6.52%
Vasily Kostenko	Communist Party	14,186	6.51%
Vil Myagkov	Civic Union	11,843	5.43%
against all		41,921	19.23%
Total		217,994	100%

Summary of the 12 December 1993 Russian legislative election in the Western constituency
Candidate	Party	Votes	%
Gennady Kalistratov	Independent	56,099	22.19%
Anatoly Zhigachyov	Party of Russian Unity and Accord	50,804	20.10%
Lyubov Oleynik	Communist Party	46,963	18.58%
Viktor Lukinykh	Independent	34,604	13.69%
Anatoly Ageyev	Independent	8,832	3.49%
against all		37,593	14.87%
Total		252,819	100%

=== 1995 ===
Summary of the 17 December 1995 Russian legislative election in the Kurgan constituency
Candidate	Party	Votes	%
Nikolay Bezborodov (incumbent)	Independent	146,250	26.99%
Svetlana Mekhnina	Our Home – Russia	80,782	14.91%
Anatoly Ustyuzhanin	Agrarian Party	67,149	12.39%
Vladimir Usmanov	Independent	62,739	11.58%
Gennady Kalistratov (incumbent)	Independent	38,663	7.13%
Boris Moiseyev	Liberal Democratic Party	25,567	4.72%
Mikhail Baskov	Trade Unions and Industrialists – Union of Labour	19,418	3.58%
Vladimir Yusov	Democratic Choice of Russia – United Democrats	18,459	3.41%
Vladimir Vasilyev	Independent	17,201	3.17%
Igor Shirmanov	Party of Tax Cuts' Supporters	11,192	2.07%
against all		46,795	8.64%
Total		541,921	100%

=== 1999 ===
Summary of the 19 December 1999 Russian legislative election in the Kurgan constituency
Candidate	Party	Votes	%
Nikolay Bezborodov (incumbent)	Independent	162,496	31.77%
Vladimir Usmanov	Independent	71,591	14.00%
Svetlana Mekhnina	Independent	59,232	11.58%
Aleksey Ivanov	Yabloko	46,706	9.13%
Nikolay Predein	Independent	33,465	6.54%
Viktor Tataurov	Independent	17,792	3.48%
Mikhail Shabanov	Independent	11,130	2.18%
Vladimir Yusov	Russian Socialist Party	10,764	2.10%
Lyudmila Morycheva	Independent	10,721	2.10%
Sergey Chirin	Independent	9,730	1.90%
Dmitry Yurchenko	Congress of Russian Communities-Yury Boldyrev Movement	7,112	1.39%
against all		59,985	11.73%
Total		511,404	100%

=== 2003 ===
Summary of the 7 December 2003 Russian legislative election in the Kurgan constituency
Candidate	Party	Votes	%
Nikolay Bezborodov (incumbent)	Independent	118,939	27.04%
Vasily Kislitsyn	Communist Party	73,236	16.65%
Mikhail Aleksandrov	Liberal Democratic Party	62,476	14.20%
Vladimir Usmanov	Independent	46,662	10.61%
Valery Verevkin	Party of Russia's Rebirth-Russian Party of Life	29,299	6.66%
Aleksey Ivanov	Yabloko	19,120	4.35%
Igor Shirokov	United Russian Party Rus'	6,423	1.46%
against all		73,870	16.79%
Total		440,154	100%

=== 2016 ===
Summary of the 18 September 2016 Russian legislative election in the Kurgan constituency
Candidate	Party	Votes	%
Aleksandr Iltyakov	United Russia	174,909	58.33%
Vasily Kislitsyn	Communist Party	44,893	14.97%
Yury Yarushin	Liberal Democratic Party	27,188	9.07%
Andrey Ilchik	A Just Russia	21,707	7.24%
Aleksandr Samoylov	Patriots of Russia	6,302	2.10%
Anar Tugushev	Communists of Russia	5,022	1.67%
Dmitry Feldsherov	Yabloko	4,010	1.34%
Viktor Sevostyanov	The Greens	4,004	1.34%
Andrey Yusupov	Rodina	3,907	1.30%
Total		299,875	100%

=== 2021 ===
Summary of the 17-19 September 2021 Russian legislative election in the Kurgan constituency
Candidate	Party	Votes	%
Aleksandr Iltyakov (incumbent)	United Russia	120,091	37.58%
Viktor Zyryanov	Communist Party	61,002	19.09%
Yury Yarushin	Liberal Democratic Party	29,570	9.25%
Valery Derzhavin	A Just Russia — For Truth	27,958	8.75%
Sergey Rogov	Party of Pensioners	19,753	6.18%
Vladimir Sender	New People	15,535	4.86%
Vyacheslav Stepanov	Communists of Russia	12,196	3.82%
Yelena Panova	Yabloko	11,809	3.70%
Aleksandr Pridannikov	Russian Party of Freedom and Justice	8,332	2.61%
Total		319,532	100%

=== 2026 ===
Summary of the 18-20 September 2026 Russian legislative election in the Kurgan constituency
Candidate	Party	Votes	%
Aleksandr Iltyakov (incumbent)	United Russia	162,283	44.34%
Viktor Zyryanov	Communist Party	53,905	14.73%
Pavel Vagin	Liberal Democratic Party	45,079	12.32%
Ksenia Tropina	New People	32,884	8.99%
Valery Derzhavin	A Just Russia	22,878	6.25%
Yelena Panova	Yabloko	19,502	5.33%
Yaroslav Klimko	Party of Pensioners	19,342	5.29%
Total		365,960	100%
