= Administrative divisions of Kurgan Oblast =

Administrative districts of Russian federal subject

Kurgan Oblast Russia
- Administrative center: Kurgan

Administrative structure (as of 2013)
- Districts: 24
- Cities/towns: 9
- Urban-type settlements: 6
- Selsovets: 419

Municipal structure (as of 2002)
- Rural settlements: 1,230 (inhabited); 14 (uninhabited)

Kurgan Oblast is a federal subject of Russia.

== Administrative and municipal divisions ==
Map

Division	Structure		OKATO	OKTMO	Urban-type settlement/ district-level town*	Rural (selsovet)
Division	Administrative	Municipal	OKATO	OKTMO	Urban-type settlement/ district-level town*	Rural (selsovet)
Kurgan (Курган)	city	urban okrug	37 401	37 701		
Shadrinsk (Шадринск)	city	urban okrug	37 405	37 705		
Almenevsky (Альменевский)	district		37 202	37 602		12
Belozersky (Белозерский)	district		37 204	37 604		19
Vargashinsky (Варгашинский)	district		37 206	37 606	Vargashi (Варгаши)	18
Dalmatovsky (Далматовский)	district		37 208	37 608	Dalmatovo (Далматово) town*	25
Zverinogolovsky (Звериноголовский)	district		37 209	37 609		8
Kargapolsky (Каргапольский)	district		37 210	37 610	Kargapolye (Каргаполье); Krasny Oktyabr (Красный Октябрь)	19
Kataysky (Катайский)	district		37 212	37 612	Kataysk (Катайск) town*	15
Ketovsky (Кетовский)	district		37 214	37 614		28
Kurtamyshsky (Куртамышский)	district		37 216	37 616	Kurtamysh (Куртамыш) town*	20
Lebyazhyevsky (Лебяжьевский)	district		37 218	37 618	Lebyazhye (Лебяжье)	18
Makushinsky (Макушинский)	district		37 220	37 620	Makushino (Макушино) town*	18
Mishkinsky (Мишкинский)	district		37 222	37 622	Mishkino (Мишкино)	17
Mokrousovsky (Мокроусовский)	district		37 224	37 624		17
Petukhovsky (Петуховский)	district		37 226	37 626	Petukhovo (Петухово) town*	17
Polovinsky (Половинский)	district		37 228	37 628		15
Pritobolny (Притобольный)	district		37 230	37 630		14
Safakulevsky (Сафакулевский)	district		37 232	37 632		13
Tselinny (Целинный)	district		37 234	37 634		19
Chastoozersky (Частоозерский)	district		37 236	37 636		9
Shadrinsky (Шадринский)	district		37 238	37 638		35
Shatrovsky (Шатровский)	district		37 240	37 640		17
Shumikhinsky (Шумихинский)	district		37 242	37 642	Shumikha (Шумиха) town*	16
Shchuchansky (Щучанский)	district		37 244	37 644	Shchuchye (Щучье) town*	16
Yurgamyshsky (Юргамышский)	district		37 246	37 646	Yurgamysh (Юргамыш)	14
