= Viktor Gilev =

Russian poet and journalist (1942–1995)

Viktor Konstantinovich Gilev
- Виктор Константинович Гилёв
- Born: Vitaly Konstantinovich Gilev (Russian: Виталий Константинович Гилёв; 30 January 1942; Zalozhnoe, Mostovskoy District. Chelyabinsk Oblast, Russian Soviet Federative Socialist Republic, Soviet Union (now Vargashinsky District, Kurgan Oblast, Russian Federation)
- Died: 4 January 1995 (aged 52); Kurgan, Kurgan Oblast, Russian Federation
- Education: Maxim Gorky Literature Institute
- Occupations: Poet and journalist
- Writing career
- Language: Russian

Viktor Konstantinovich Gilev (Russian: Виктор Константинович Гилёв; January 30, 1942 – January 4, 1995; born: Vitaly Konstantinovich Gilev (Russian: Виталий Константинович Гилёв) was a Soviet and Russian poet and journalist.

== Life and work ==
Vitaly Konstantinovich Gilev was born on January 30, 1942, in the village of Maloe Zalozhnoe of the Mostovskoy District of the Chelyabinsk Oblast, Russian Soviet Federative Socialist Republic, Union of Soviet Socialist Republics; now the village of Zalozhnoe of the Vargashinsky District of the Kurgan Oblast, Russian Federation.

In 1958, his first poems were published in the youth regional newspaper "Molodoy Leninets" (lit. 'Young Leninist').

In 1959, he graduated from the tenth grade of Mostovskaya Secondary school and moved in Kurgan, where he worked on the plant.

Since 1960, he was a literary worker in the editorial office of the newspaper "Mostovskaya Pravda" (lit. 'Mostovskoe Truth') until the abolition of the district in 1963.

During the academic year 1964–1965, he worked as a teacher at an eight-year-old school in the village of Kropani in the Ketovsky District of the Kurgan Oblast.

Since 1965, he worked as a literary worker in the Mokrousovsky District newspaper "Voskhod" (lit. ' Sunrise'), led a circle of young journalists in the village of Mokrousovo.

In 1965 he entered the correspondence department of the Maxim Gorky Literature Institute, from which she graduated in 1972.

In March 1971, he joined the Communist Party of the Soviet Union.

For about 10 years he worked as deputy editor of the Shumikhinsky District newspaper "Znamya Truda" (lit. 'The Banner of Labor').

He worked as an editor of the Kurtamyshsky District newspaper Kurtamyshskaya Niva (lit. 'The Kurtamysh field').

In 1990 he graduated from the Higher Party School in Sverdlovsk.

Since October 1991, a member of the Union of Russian Writers.

In February 1993, he became his own correspondent for the regional newspaper "Molodoy Leninets" (lit. 'Young Leninist'), which was transformed first into the "Subbotnaya gazeta" (lit. 'Saturday Newspaper') (1991–1994), and then into the newspaper "Zauralie" (lit. 'Trans-Urals').

Viktor Konstantinovich Gilev died on January 4, 1995, in Kurgan, Kurgan Oblast, Russian Federation.

== Published works ==
He is the author of five collections of poetry published during the author's lifetime and one prose book:

- Гилев В.К. (1968). Гусли (in Russian) (10000 ed.). Chelyabinsk: South Ural Publishing House. p. 48.
- Гилев В.К. (1986). Подовый хлеб (in Russian) (5000 ed.). Chelyabinsk: South Ural Publishing House. p. 44.
- Гилев В.К. (1990). Разговор с любимой (in Russian). Chelyabinsk: South Ural Publishing House.
- Гилев В.К. (1991). Вербный край (in Russian) (1000 ed.). Chelyabinsk: South Ural Publishing House. p. 69. ISBN 5-7688-0429-3.
- Гилев В.К. (1992). Лирика (in Russian) (1000 ed.). Kurgan: Periodika. p. 64. ISBN 5-8282-0023-2.
- Гилев В.К. (1993). Свет утренних зорь [о Х. С. Темирханове] (in Russian) (1000 ed.). Kurgan: Reforma. p. 61. ISBN 5-86051-030-6.
- Гилев В.К. (1993). Предприниматель : [о В. А. Жилине] (in Russian) (1500 ed.). Kurgan: Periodika. p. 23.
