= Mokrousovo =

Mokrousovo (Russian: Мокроусово) is the name of several rural localities in Russia:

- Mokrousovo, Republic of Bashkortostan, a village in Iskinsky Selsoviet of Ufa, the Republic of Bashkortostan
- Mokrousovo, Kemerovo Oblast, a village in Sidorovskaya Rural Territory of Novokuznetsky District of Kemerovo Oblast
- Mokrousovo, Kurgan Oblast, a selo in Mokrousovsky Selsoviet of Mokrousovsky District of Kurgan Oblast
- Mokrousovo, Kursk Oblast, a village in Podovsky Selsoviet of Khomutovsky District of Kursk Oblast
- Mokrousovo, Yaroslavl Oblast, a village in Chebakovsky Rural Okrug of Tutayevsky District of Yaroslavl Oblast
