= Vargashi =

Vargashi (Russian: Варгаши) is the name of several inhabited localities in Kurgan Oblast, Russia.

== Urban localities ==
- Vargashi (urban-type settlement), an urban-type settlement in Vargashinsky District

== Rural localities ==
- Vargashi (rural locality), a selo in Vargashinsky Selsoviet of Vargashinsky District
