= Lagunov =

Lagunov, fem. Lagunova (Russian: Лагунов, Лагунова) is a Russian-language surname. Notable people with this surname include:

- Yevgeny Lagunov Russian swimmer
- Dmitri Lagunov (1888–1942) Russian footballer
- Maria Lagunova, World War II Soviet woman tank driver

== See also ==
- Logunov
