= Polovinny =

Polovinny (Russian: Полови́нный; masculine), Polovinnaya (Полови́нная; feminine), or Polovinnoye (Полови́нное; neuter) is the name of several rural localities in Russia:

- Polovinny, Nizhny Novgorod Oblast, a pochinok in Gorevsky Selsoviet of Urensky District of Nizhny Novgorod Oblast
- Polovinny, Kirovgrad, Sverdlovsk Oblast, a settlement under the administrative jurisdiction of the Town of Kirovgrad, Sverdlovsk Oblast
- Polovinny, Verkhnyaya Pyshma, Sverdlovsk Oblast, a settlement under the administrative jurisdiction of the Town of Verkhnyaya Pyshma, Sverdlovsk Oblast
- Polovinnoye, Polovinsky District, Kurgan Oblast, a selo in Polovinsky Selsoviet of Polovinsky District of Kurgan Oblast
- Polovinnoye, Tselinny District, Kurgan Oblast, a selo in Polovinsky Selsoviet of Tselinny District of Kurgan Oblast
- Polovinnoye, Barabinsky District, Novosibirsk Oblast, a village in Barabinsky District, Novosibirsk Oblast
- Polovinnoye, Krasnozyorsky District, Novosibirsk Oblast, a selo in Krasnozyorsky District, Novosibirsk Oblast
- Polovinnoye, Tyumen Oblast, a selo in Zaroslovsky Rural Okrug of Berdyuzhsky District of Tyumen Oblast
- Polovinnaya, Irkutsk Oblast, a settlement in Slyudyansky District of Irkutsk Oblast
- Polovinnaya, Nizhny Novgorod Oblast, a village in Khmelevitsky Selsoviet of Shakhunya, Nizhny Novgorod Oblast
