= Kargapolye =

Kargapolye (Russian: Каргаполье) is the name of several inhabited localities in Kargopolsky District of Kurgan Oblast, Russia.

Urban localities

- Kargapolye (urban-type settlement), an urban-type settlement under district jurisdiction

Rural localities

- Kargapolye (rural locality), a settlement in Maysky Selsoviet
