= Mokrousovsky =

Mokrousovsky (masculine), Mokrousovskaya (feminine), or Mokrousovskoye (neuter) may refer to:

- Mokrousovsky District, a district of Kurgan Oblast, Russia
- Mokrousovsky (rural locality), a rural locality (a settlement) in Kemerovo Oblast, Russia
