= Kataysky =

Kataysky (masculine, Russian: Катайский), Katayskaya (feminine), or Katayskoye (neuter) may refer to:

- Kataysky District, a district of Kurgan Oblast, Russia
- Katayskoye, a rural locality (a village) in Nizhny Novgorod Oblast, Russia
