= Lyubov Andreeva =

Russian poet and journalist (1942–2021)

Lyubov Kharitonovna Andreeva
- Любовь Харитоновна Андреева
- Born: 29 April 1942; Zalozhnoe, Mostovskoj District. Chelyabinsk Oblast, Russian Soviet Federative Socialist Republic (now Vargashinsky District, Kurgan Oblast, Russia)
- Died: 15 April 2021 (aged 78); Kurgan, Kurgan Oblast, Russia
- Resting place: New Rjabkovskoe cemetery in Kurgan
- Education: Maxim Gorky Literature Institute
- Occupations: Poet and journalist
- Writing career
- Language: Russian
- Website: andreeva-lubov.tilda.ws

Lyubov Kharitonovna Andreeva (Любо́вь Харито́новна Андре́ева; 29 April 1942 – 15 April 2021) was a Soviet and Russian poet and journalist.

== Life and work ==
Lyubov Kharitonovna Andreeva was born on 29 April 1942, in the village of Bolshoe Zalozhnoe of the Mostovskoj District of the Chelyabinsk Oblast, now the village of Zalozhnoe of the Vargashinsky District of the Kurgan Oblast. Her parents worked in the kolkhoz. Her father died in World War II.

In 1960, she graduated from the tenth grade of Mostovskaya Secondary school and moved in Kurgan, where she worked on the construction of residential buildings.

In December 1965, she joined the Communist Party of the Soviet Union.

In 1966 she entered the correspondence department of the Maxim Gorky Literature Institute, from which she graduated in 1972.

As a journalist, she began her career in October 1966 in the editorial office of the newspaper Young Leninist (a newspaper of the Kurgan Regional Committee of the Komsomol).

Since 11 October 1971, a member of the Union of Soviet Writers, after the collapse of the Joint Venture of the USSR - a member of the Union of Russian Writers.

In February 1971, she was accepted as the head of the literary circle at the Palace of Culture of the Kurgankhimmash plant, then, from June 1973, she was the editor of the radio broadcasting of the Kurgankhimmash plant. In 1977, Kurgan Armaturny (Valve) and Kurgankhimmash plants were reorganized into Kurganarmkhimmash software. On 15 November 1989, the Kurganarmkhimmash Production Association was abolished, and the plants became independent again. She continued her work as an editor of the Rebar Plant radio broadcasting. In January 1991, she was appointed editor of the factory newspaper Mayak. In 1993, the Kurgan Rebar Plant was corporatized and reorganized into JSC "Ikar" - Kurgan Pipeline Valve Plant".

In April 2006, she retired.

Lyubov Kharitonovna Andreeva died on the morning of 15 April 2021 in a hospital in Kurgan, Kurgan Oblast. She is buried in the New Rjabkovskoe cemetery there.

== Published works ==
Many of Andreeva's poems are dedicated to the working class and the nature of the Kurgan Oblast.

Her poems were published in the newspapers Literaturnaya Gazeta, ''Literaturnaya Russia'', ''Sovetskoe Zaurale'', ''Novy Mir'', Young Leninist, Moskovskij Komsomolets, magazines Tekhnika Molodezhi, "Ural", Siberian Krai, almanacs Poetry and Tobol, anthologies, were transmitted by the All Union First Programme radio and regional radio.

Some of her poems have been translated into Polish, published in the newspaper Głos Pomorza, translator Czesław Kuriata.

Published works:

- Подснежник /10 книжек в обертке: Андреева Л., Балакина О., Батраченко Е., Бендик Л.П., Доброхотов Л., Попов П., Суздалев Г., Толокнов В., Тэрнптэ Б., Ухалова Т./ (5000 экз ed.). Челябинск: Южно-Уральское кн. изд-во. 1968.
- Андреева Л.Х. (1970). Стриженое лето (10000 экз ed.). Челябинск: Южн.-Урал. кн. изд. – via Илл. Ю.М, Бунов.
- Андреева Л.Х. (1976). Полдень (5000 экз ed.). Челябинск: Юж.-Уральск. кн. изд-во.
- Андреева Л.Х. (2003). Наедине с рекой. Куртамыш: Парус-М. ISBN 5-98271-005-9.
- Андреева Л.Х. (2009). Птицы летящие. Курган: центр «Отклик».
- Андреева Л.Х. (2018). Дали бытия. Курган. ISBN 978-5-98271-271-4.

== Awards and honours ==
- Medal of the FNPR "100 years of Trade unions of Russia"
- Commemorative medal "100 years of the Great October Socialist Revolution" (KPRF)
- The Udarnik of Communist Labor, March 16, 1970
- Letter of thanks from the Head of the city Government of the Mayor of Kurgan, August 2002
- Badge "Veteran of the plant" of JSC "Ikar", November 18, 2004
- Kurgan City Award "Recognition", 2004
- Diploma of the literary contest "PEACE AND FATHERLAND", 2020

== Bibliography ==
- Антология зауральских писателей. Vol. 1. Куран. 2011. pp. 65–74. ISBN 978-5-904279-33-2 – via Сост. В.И. Филимонов.
- Янко, М. Д. (1973). Советские писатели Зауралья : Пособие к спецкурсу по литературе родного края (1000 экз ed.). Курган. pp. 156–159.
