= Dalmatovo =

Town in Kurgan Oblast, Russia

Dalmatovo Далматово
- Town
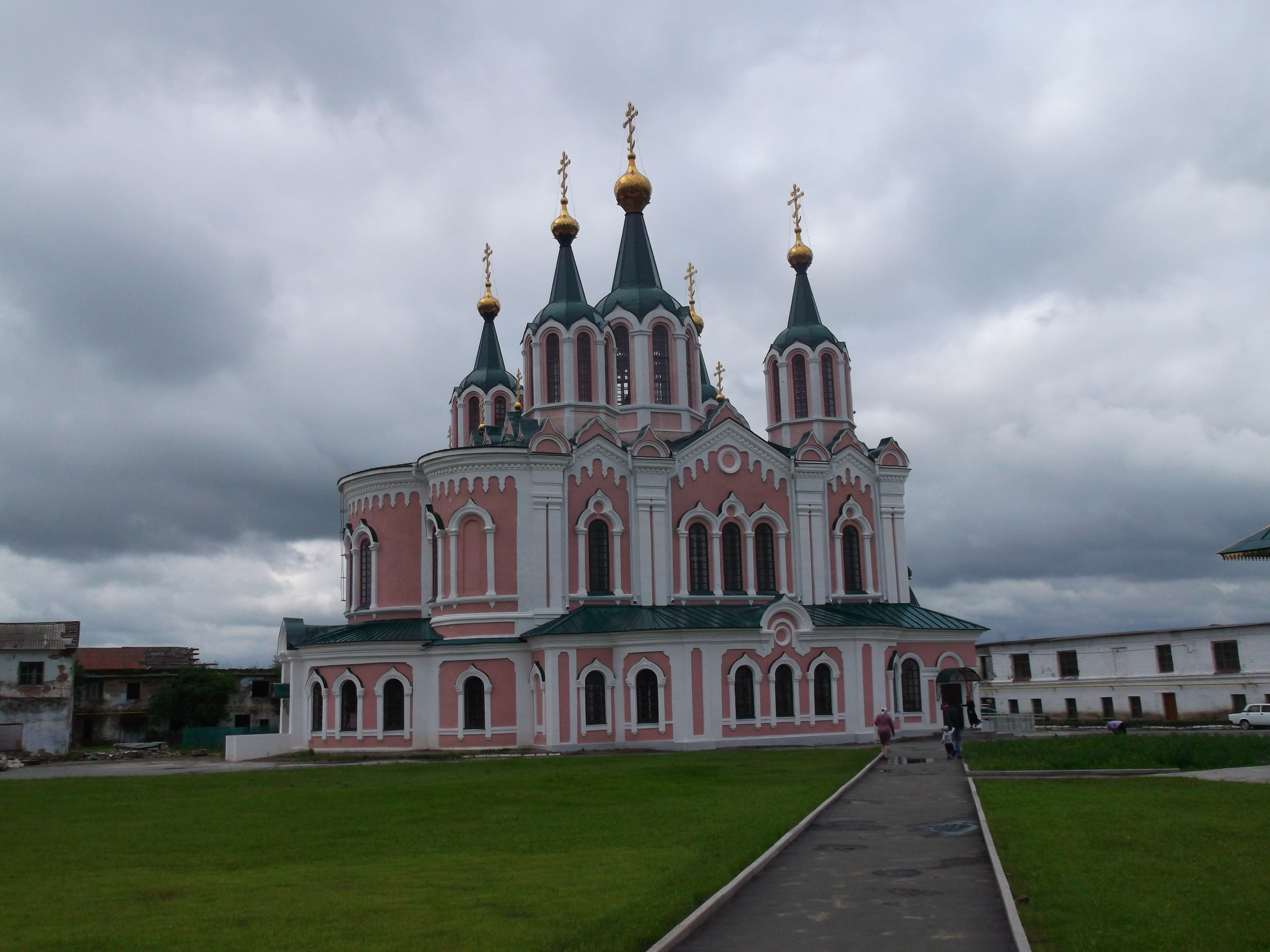
- Dalmatovo

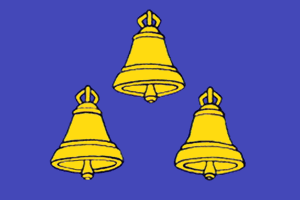
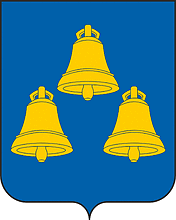
- Flag Coat of arms
- Interactive map of Dalmatovo
- Location of Dalmatovo Dalmatovo (Kurgan Oblast)
- Coordinates: 56°16′N 62°56′E
- Country: Russia
- Federal subject: Kurgan Oblast
- Administrative district: Dalmatovsky District
- Town under district jurisdictionSelsoviet: Dalmatovo
- Founded: 1644
- Town status since: 1947
- Elevation: 100 m (330 ft)

Population (2010 Census)
  - Total: 13,911
  - Estimate (2025): 11,172 (−19.7%)

Administrative status
  - Capital of: Dalmatovsky District, Dalmatovo Town Under District Jurisdiction

Municipal status
  - Municipal district: Dalmatovsky Municipal District
  - Urban settlement: Dalmatovo Urban Settlement
  - Capital of: Dalmatovsky Municipal District, Dalmatovo Urban Settlement
- Time zone: UTC+5 (MSK+2)
- Postal code: 641730
- OKTMO ID: 37608101001
- Website: dalmatovo.org

Dalmatovo (Russian: Далма́тово) is a town and the administrative center of Dalmatovsky District in Kurgan Oblast, Russia, located east of the Ural Mountains on the north bank of the Iset River (Tobol's tributary; Ob's basin), opposite the mouth of the Techa River, 192 kilometers (119 mi) northwest of Kurgan, the administrative center of the oblast. Population: 13,911 (2010 census); 14,972 (2002 census); 17,494 (1989 Soviet census). It was previously known as Dalmatovskoye.

== History ==
It was founded in 1644 as a sloboda next to the Dalmat Assumption Monastery, founded by a monk named Dalmat (hence, the name). Later on, this sloboda became a settlement of Dalmatovskoye (Далма́товское). Dalmatovo is known to have been one of the first centers of orthodoxy, literacy, and Russian culture in the Trans-Ural region in the early 18th century. It was also a place of exile for some of the Old Believers. In 1781, Dalmatovo was granted town status but then downgraded back to rural status in 1797. In the 19th century, Dalmatovo was known as a major center of cucumber cultivation and hop picking. In 1947, it was granted towns status once again.

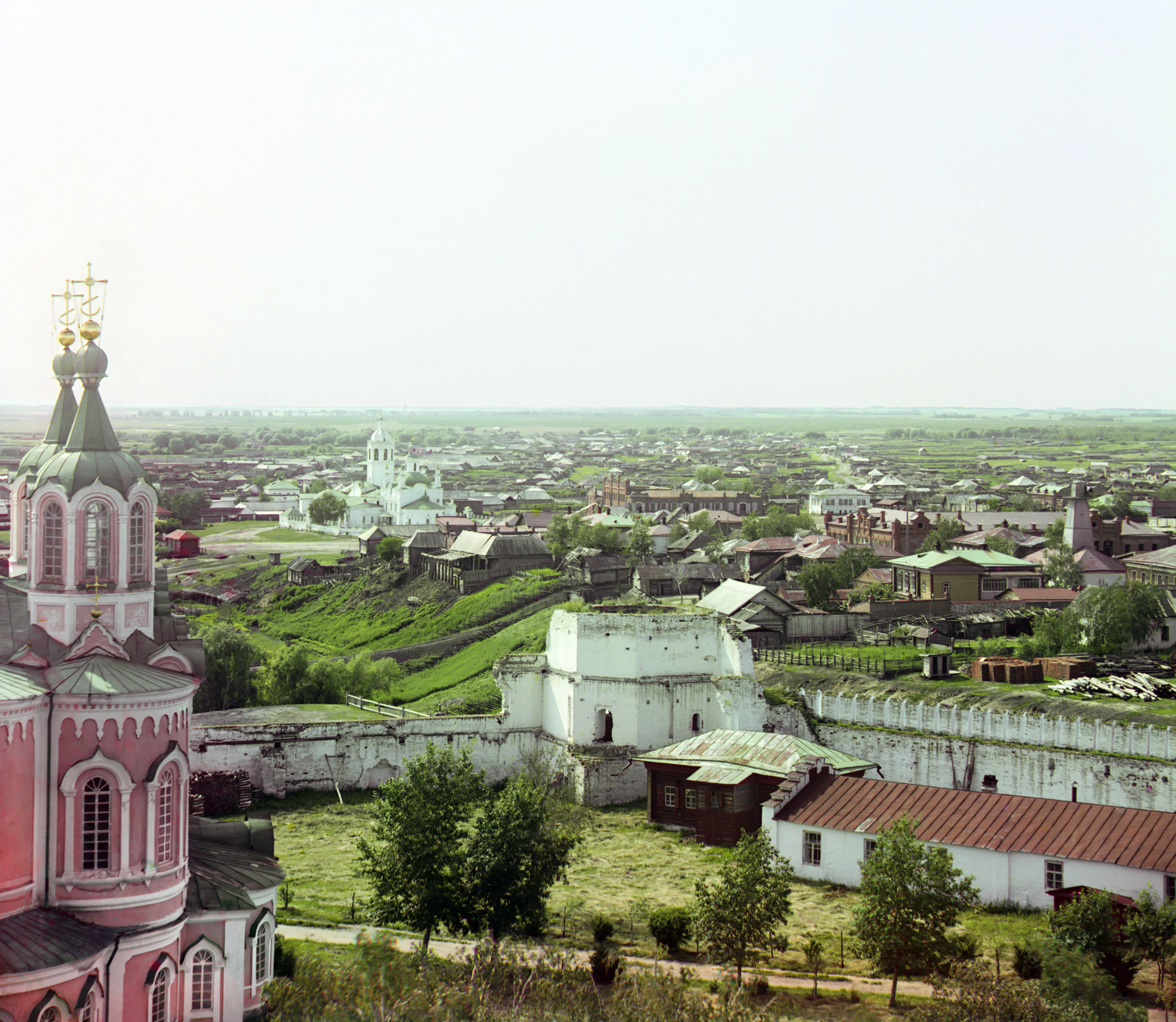
Dalmatovo in 1912

== Administrative and municipal status ==
Within the framework of administrative divisions, Dalmatovo serves as the administrative center of Dalmatovsky District. As an administrative division, it is, together with three rural localities, incorporated within Dalmatovsky District as Dalmatovo Town Under District Jurisdiction. As a municipal division, Dalmatovo Town Under District Jurisdiction is incorporated within Dalmatovsky Municipal District as Dalmatovo Urban Settlement.

== Economy ==
The city is located "Dalmatovskaya confectionery factory", owned by "Dalmatovo".
