= Krasny Oktyabr, Kurgan Oblast =

Krasny Oktyabr Красный Октябрь
- Urban-type settlement
- Interactive map of Krasny Oktyabr
- Location of Krasny Oktyabr Krasny Oktyabr (Kurgan Oblast)
- Coordinates: 55.6534°N 64.8103°E
- Country: Russia
- Federal subject: Kurgan Oblast
- Administrative district: Kargapolsky District

Population (2010 Census)
  - Total: 4,234
  - Estimate (2025): 3,293 (−22.2%)
- Time zone: UTC+5 (MSK+2)
- Postal code: 641940
- OKTMO ID: 37610154051

Krasny Oktyabr (Russian: Красный Октябрь) is an urban locality (an urban-type settlement) in Kargapolsky District of Kurgan Oblast, Russia. Population: 4,234 (2010 census); 4,178 (2002 census); 4,517 (1989 Soviet census).
