= Alexander Iltyakov =

Russian politician (born 1971)

- Александр Ильтяков
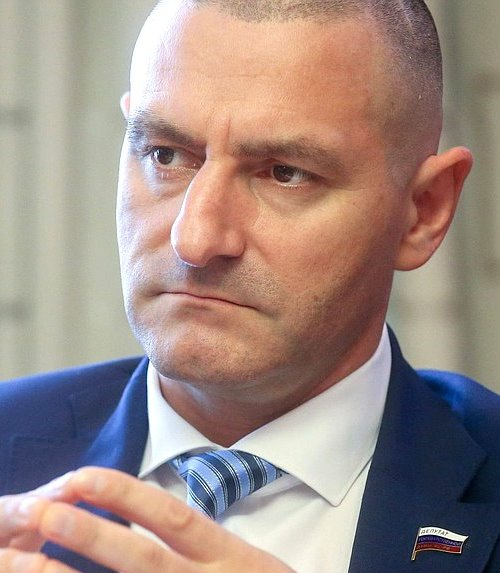

Member of the State Duma for Kurgan Oblast
- Incumbent
- Assumed office 5 October 2016
- Preceded by: constituency re-established
- Constituency: Kurgan-at-large (No. 108)

Member of the State Duma (Party List Seat)
- In office 21 December 2011 – 5 October 2016

Personal details
- Born: 9 October 1971 (age 54) Kurgan, Kurgan Oblast, Russian SFSR, USSR
- Party: United Russia
- Education: Kurgan State University

Alexander Vladimirovich Iltyakov (Russian: Александр Владимирович Ильтяков; born 9 October 1971, Kurgan, Kurgan Oblast) is a Russian political figure and a deputy of 6th, 7th, and 8th State Dumas. In 2008, he was awarded a Doctor of Sciences in Technical Sciences.

In 1995, he, together with his brothers, founded the "Veles" meat processing plant. From 1995 to 2011, he worked as an executive director of the plant. In June 2011, Iltyakov presented to Vladimir Putin a business plan on how to develop meat production in the Ural region. The plan was later included in the All-Russia People's Front's program. The same year, Iltyakov was elected as a deputy of the 6th State Duma from the Kurgan Oblast constituency. In 2016 and 2021, he was re-elected for the 7th and 8th State Dumas respectively.

In November 2024, Iltyakov, commenting on the draft Strategy of Action for the Implementation of Family and Demographic Policy, Support for Large Families in Russia, called on Russian women to have children: “While the birthing machine is working, do what the earth tells you to do.” He later explained that by “birthing machine” he meant the eggs and uterus. Later, in an interview with Komsomolskaya Pravda radio, Iltyakov called those women who want to decide for themselves when to give birth “stuffed animals”.

== Legislative Activities ==
From 2011 to 2019, during his tenure as a deputy of the State Duma of the 6th and 7th convocations, he co-authored 42 legislative initiatives and amendments to draft federal laws.

== Controversial statements ==
In November 2024, commenting on the draft Strategy of Action for the Implementation of Family and Demographic Policy and Support for Large Families in Russia, Aleksandr Ilytyakov urged Russian women to have children: “As long as the childbearing organ works — do what you are meant to do on this earth.” He later explained that by “childbearing organ” he meant eggs and the uterus.

Later, in an interview with Komsomolskaya Pravda radio, Ilytyakov, a board member of the National Union of Meat Processors of Russia, referred to women who want to decide for themselves when to give birth as “scarecrows.”

== Sanctions ==
He was sanctioned by the UK government in 2022 in relation to the Russo-Ukrainian War.

== Family ==
Alexander Vladimirovich is married (his wife is Lyudmila Anatolyevna); the couple has five children.
