= Polovinsky District =

Polovinsky District Половинский район (Russian)
- District
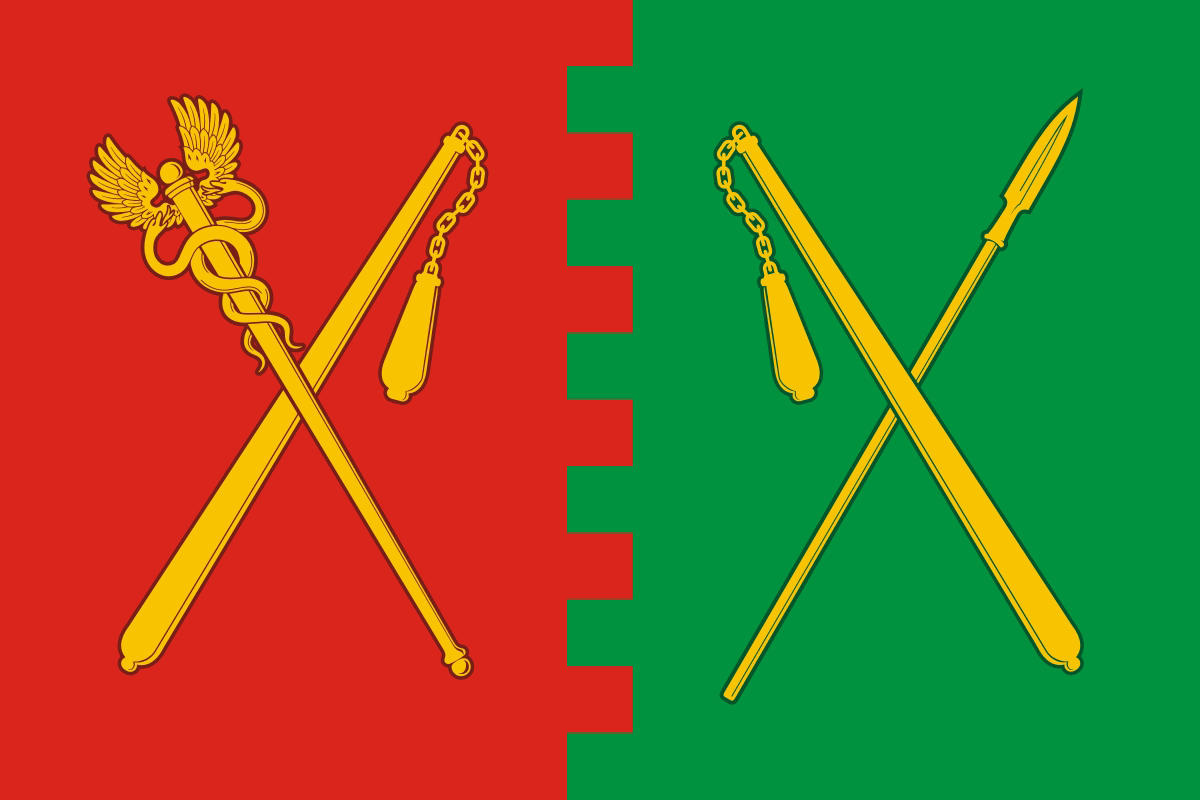
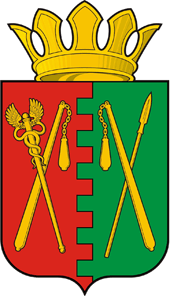
- Flag Coat of arms
- Location of Polovinsky District in Kurgan Oblast
- Coordinates: 54°47′20″N 65°59′14″E
- Country: Russia
- Federal subject: Kurgan Oblast
- Established: 1924
- Administrative center: Polovinnoye

Area
  - Total: 2,728 km^{2} (1,053 sq mi)

Population (2010 Census)
  - Total: 12,255
  - Density: 4.492/km^{2} (11.64/sq mi)
  - Urban: 0%
  - Rural: 100%

Administrative structure
  - Administrative divisions: 15 selsoviet
  - Inhabited localities: 35 rural localities

Municipal structure
  - Municipally incorporated as: Polovinsky Municipal District
  - Municipal divisions: 0 urban settlements, 15 rural settlements
- Time zone: UTC+5 (MSK+2)
- OKTMO ID: 37628000
- Website: http://www.poladmin.ru/

Polovinsky District (Russian: Половинский райо́н) is an administrative and municipal district (raion), one of the twenty-four in Kurgan Oblast, Russia. It is located in the south of the oblast and borders with Pritobolny District in the west, Ketovsky District in the northwest, Vargashinsky District in the north, Lebyazhyevsky District in the northeast, Makushinsky District in the southeast, and the Russian border with Kazakhstan to its south.

The area of the district is 2,728 square kilometers (1,053 sq mi). Its administrative center is the rural locality (a selo) of Polovinnoye. Population: 12,255 (2010 census); 16,295 (2002 Census); 17,123 (1989 Soviet census). The population of Polovinnoye accounts for 37.9% of the district's total population.

== History ==
The district was established in 1924.
