= Mariya Lagunova =

Soviet tank driver

Mariya Ivanovna Lagunova
- Native name: Мария Ивановна Лагунова
- Born: 4 July 1921 Okonechnikovo village, Kamensky district, Yekaterinburg Governorate, RSFSR
- Died: 26 December 1995 (aged 74) Brovary, Kyiv Oblast, Ukraine
- Allegiance: Soviet Union
- Branch: Red Army
- Awards: Order of the Red Star

Mariya Ivanovna Lagunova (Russian: Мария Ивановна Лагунова; 4 July 1921 – 26 December 1995) – was a Soviet tank driver who served in the Great Patriotic War (the Eastern Front of World War II). During the war she served with the 56th Guards Tank Brigade as a mechanic-driver of a T-34 tank, eventually achieving the rank of guard sergeant.

== Early life ==
Maria Ivanovna Lagunova was born on 4 July 1921, in the village of Okonechnikovo (Ushakovsky selsoviet), Nikitinskaya Volost, in the Kamensky District of Yekaterinburg Governorate (now the Kataisk District of the Kurgan Region).

The family had five children. Her mother died when Lagunova was four, so she became responsible for herself at an early age, and began to work early to feed and dress herself and her family. She graduated from junior high school after five years.

Lagunova's elder brother Nikolay died in battle in the first days of the war on the front. She was then taken to her sister in Sverdlovsk, where she worked as a nanny. From the age of 16, she began working at the Uralobuv factory. She initially worked as an electrician, but wanted to become a truck driver. When she had spare time and the factory truck was not in use she studied it, and was happy if she was allowed to sit behind the wheel.

== During the Great Patriotic War ==
=== At the front ===
With the outbreak of the Great Patriotic War, her older brother Nikolai went to the front, and Maria decided to follow his example. After repeated appeals to the Stalinsky District Military Commissariat of Sverdlovsk, she received a summons and was one of the 20-year-old girls sent to the Chelyabinsk school for military tractor drivers.

In the winter of 1942, she was sent to the airfield service battalion on the Volkhov Front, a few kilometers from the front lines. During 1942 on her tractor she felled trees, stubbed stumps, leveled the ground, and plowed snow. During the bombing of the airfield, Corporal Lagunova suffered a concussion and was and sent to the reserve regiment, where she was identified as a projectionist.

=== Driver mechanic ===
In February 1943, a military representative from the Urals came to the regiment to select tankmen for training. Lagunova decided to enroll, but was rejected. She then wrote a letter to M.I. Kalinin in Moscow, and in a few days the military representative was ordered to take Lagunova as a cadet. Of the 700 cadet candidates for tank service who arrived in March 1943 in the city of Nizhny Tagil, Lagunva was the only woman.

The course program was designed for four months, but the best cadets of the 19th Training Tank Regiment of the 2nd Training Tank Brigade were asked to take exams early in June. Lagunova was among the best mechanic-drivers and passed exams ahead of schedule. She flatly refused to stay in the regiment as an instructor, and was directed to the front to join the 424th Tank Battalion of the 56th Guards Tank Brigade.

Sergeant Lagunova received her baptism of fire with the Guards at the Battle of Kursk. After the counterattack by Soviet troops near Kursk, tankers fought farther to the west, through Sumy, Chernihiv, and Kiev regions of Ukraine.

Ivanovna showed herself an experienced and brave driver, and enjoyed the military authority of the tankers. The brigade described her as "our tank ace".

From 1943 she was a candidate for membership in the All-Union Communist Party.

=== The last 13th battle ===
On 28 September 1943 near Kiev, in the city of Brovary, the brigade was involved in heavy fighting. Control of the village of Knyazhiychi passed from the Russians to the Germans twice. Captain Mityakin, the battalion zampolit (political commissar), personally led the tankers in another tank attack on German positions while in a T-34 (commander of the tank – Lieutenant Chumakov), where M.I. Lagunova served as a mechanic driver. This was her 13th battle.

Initially, the attack developed successfully: bursting through the German lines, the crew destroyed German artillery, destroyed the machine gun parapet in the trenches and killed enemy soldiers and officers. But a shell damaged the caterpillar track and one landed in the mechanic driver's seat, putting the tank out of action.

=== At the hospital ===
Unconscious, Lagunova was evacuated from the tank and taken to a field hospital. She lost her legs and right hand.

She was airlifted to Sumy, from there to Ulyanovsk, and then to Omsk. Here, surgeon Valentina Borisova conducted a series of operations to partially save her legs so that Lagunova would be able to walk on prosthetics. In the hospital Lagunova was awarded the Order of the Red Star. The delegation from the Nizhny Tagil Training Regiment brought her some 60 letters from friends and from cadets she did not know who were new replacements.

From letters sent from the front written by the commander of the brigade, Colonel M.K. Scooby and her former combatant Major Honin, she learned that her portrait hangs in a room at the regimental headquarters and her military biography is taught to all the cadets for educational purposes.

According to other sources, Lagunova was considered to have died, and fellow soldiers from the 56th Guards Tank Brigade only learned that she was alive 20 years later from press publications by the writer S.S. Smirnov.

In the spring of 1944, Lagunova was taken to the Central Institute of Traumatology and Prosthodontics of the Ministry of Health of the USSR in Moscow, where she had prosthetics made.

Returning to the training regiment, Lagunova served as a telegraph operator for four years. She continued to learn how to walk on her prosthetics. In 1948, she was demobilized.

== Awards ==
- Order of the Red Star
- Order of the Patriotic War of the 1st degree
- Medal "For Courage"
- campaign and jubilee medals

She was made an honorary citizen of the cities of Kataysk, Kurgan Oblast (Russia), Brovary (Ukraine) and Grunewald (Germany).

== Later life and family ==
She lived in Sverdlovsk, worked at the Uralobuv factory as a controller of the quality control department (Russian: ОТК). She married Kuzma Yakovlevich Firsov, whom she had met in the hospital, also a war veteran. When Firsov proposed to Lagunova, she laughed and cried: "What will we do? We both need a nanny". They had two sons, Nickolay (born in 1949) and Vasily (born in 1953), both named after the dead brothers of Lagunova and Firsov. They had grandchildren, and lived in the village of Knyazhi, Brovarsky district, in the Kyiv region of Ukraine.

In the 1960s, following the advice of physicians, due to bad asthma, she was forced to move for a change in climate. The family moved to Khmelnytsky, and then to Brovary. She died on 26 December 1995, at the age of 74 years.

== Remembrances ==
Streets in the city of Brovary and the village Knyazhiychi in Ukraine, as well as the home of Luganova in the city of Kataysky are named after her.

She was made an honorary citizen of the city of Brovary. In 2010, on the eve of the Victory Day celebrations in the city of Nizhny Tagil a memorial plaque was installed in her memory.

On 6 May 2013, a memorial plaque in her memory was installed on one of the houses on the street named after her (M. Lagunova Street, house number 38).

In 2015, the documentary series The Magic Regiment was broadcast. The third series Masha is devoted to her life and feats.

In the museum the "History of the T-34 tank", part of the exhibition "Women and Tanks", is dedicated to M. I. Lagunova.

After more than 20 years, Lagunova drove a tank again when she was in Germany as part of a delegation from her regiment. One foreign journalist doubted that a frau could be a tank mechanic. Lagunova sat in the driver's seat of the tank and, with all the force on the friction pedal of both prosthetics, drove the tank. The doubting journalist shouted "Bravo, Frau Meresiev!"
