= Shumikha, Kurgan Oblast =

Town in Kurgan Oblast, Russia

Shumikha Шумиха
- Town
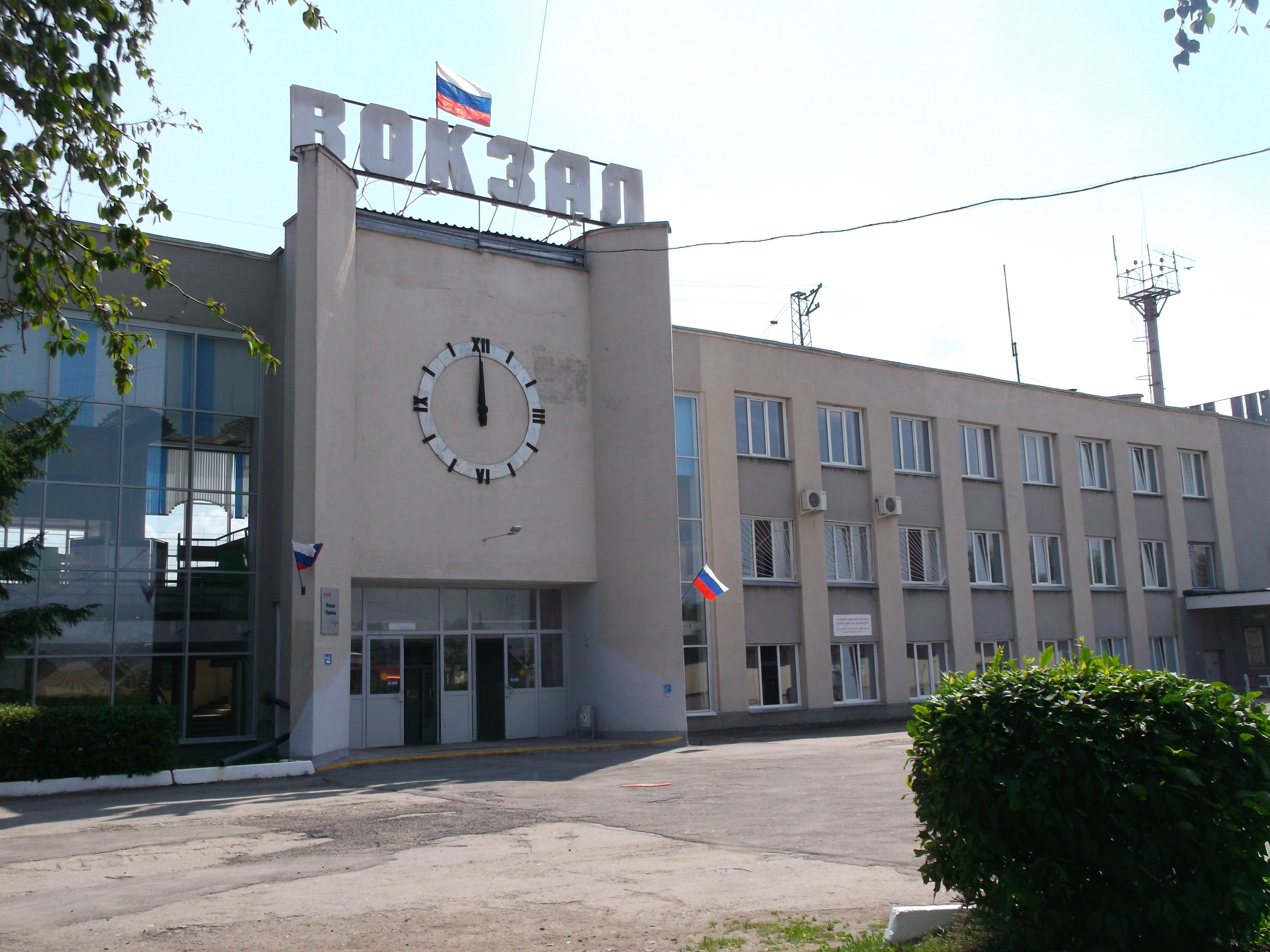
- Shumikha Rail Station

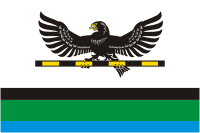
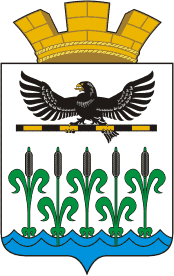
- Flag Coat of arms
- Interactive map of Shumikha
- Location of Shumikha Shumikha (Kurgan Oblast)
- Coordinates: 55°14′N 63°18′E
- Country: Russia
- Federal subject: Kurgan Oblast
- Administrative district: Shumikhinsky District
- Town under district jurisdictionSelsoviet: Shumikha
- Founded: 1892
- Town status since: 1944
- Elevation: 170 m (560 ft)

Population (2010 Census)
  - Total: 17,819
  - Estimate (2025): 16,045 (−10%)

Administrative status
  - Capital of: Shumikhinsky District, Shumikha Town Under District Jurisdiction

Municipal status
  - Municipal district: Shumikhinsky Municipal District
  - Urban settlement: Shumikha Urban Settlement
  - Capital of: Shumikhinsky Municipal District, Shumikha Urban Settlement
- Time zone: UTC+5 (MSK+2)
- Postal codes: 641100–641102, 641109
- OKTMO ID: 37642101001

Shumikha (Russian: Шуми́ха) is a town and the administrative center of Shumikhinsky District in Kurgan Oblast, Russia, located 133 kilometers (83 mi) west of Kurgan, the administrative center of the oblast. Population: 17,819 (2010 census); 19,083 (2002 census); 21,984 (1989 Soviet census).

== History ==
It was founded in 1892 as a settlement around the railway station of the same name (opened in 1896). It was granted town status in 1944.

== Administrative and municipal status ==
Within the framework of administrative divisions, Shumikha serves as the administrative center of Shumikhinsky District. As an administrative division, it is incorporated within Shumikhinsky District as Shumikha Town Under District Jurisdiction. As a municipal division, Shumikha Town Under District Jurisdiction is incorporated within Shumikhinsky Municipal District as Shumikha Urban Settlement.
