= Dalmat =

Dalmat is a surname. Notable people with the surname include:

- Jeffrey Dalmat (born 1991), French basketball player
- Stéphane Dalmat (born 1979), French footballer
- Wilfried Dalmat (born 1982), French footballer, brother of Stéphane

One vessel of the Austro-Hungarian and Royal Yugoslav navies has also carried the name:

- Dalmat
