= Lebyazhye, Lebyazhyevsky District, Kurgan Oblast =

Lebyazhye Лебяжье
- Urban-type settlement
- Interactive map of Lebyazhye
- Location of Lebyazhye Lebyazhye (Kurgan Oblast)
- Coordinates: 55.2726°N 66.5046°E
- Country: Russia
- Federal subject: Kurgan Oblast
- Administrative district: Lebyazhyevsky District
- Founded: 1848

Population (2010 Census)
  - Total: 6,452
  - Estimate (2025): 5,291 (−18%)
- Time zone: UTC+5 (MSK+2)
- Postal code: 641500
- OKTMO ID: 37618151051

Lebyazhye (Russian: Лебяжье) is an urban locality (an urban-type settlement) in Lebyazhyevsky District of Kurgan Oblast, Russia. Population: 6,452 (2010 census); 6,891 (2002 census); 8,039 (1989 Soviet census).
