= Shchuchansky District =

District in Kurgan Oblast, Russia

Shchuchansky District Щучанский район (Russian)
- District
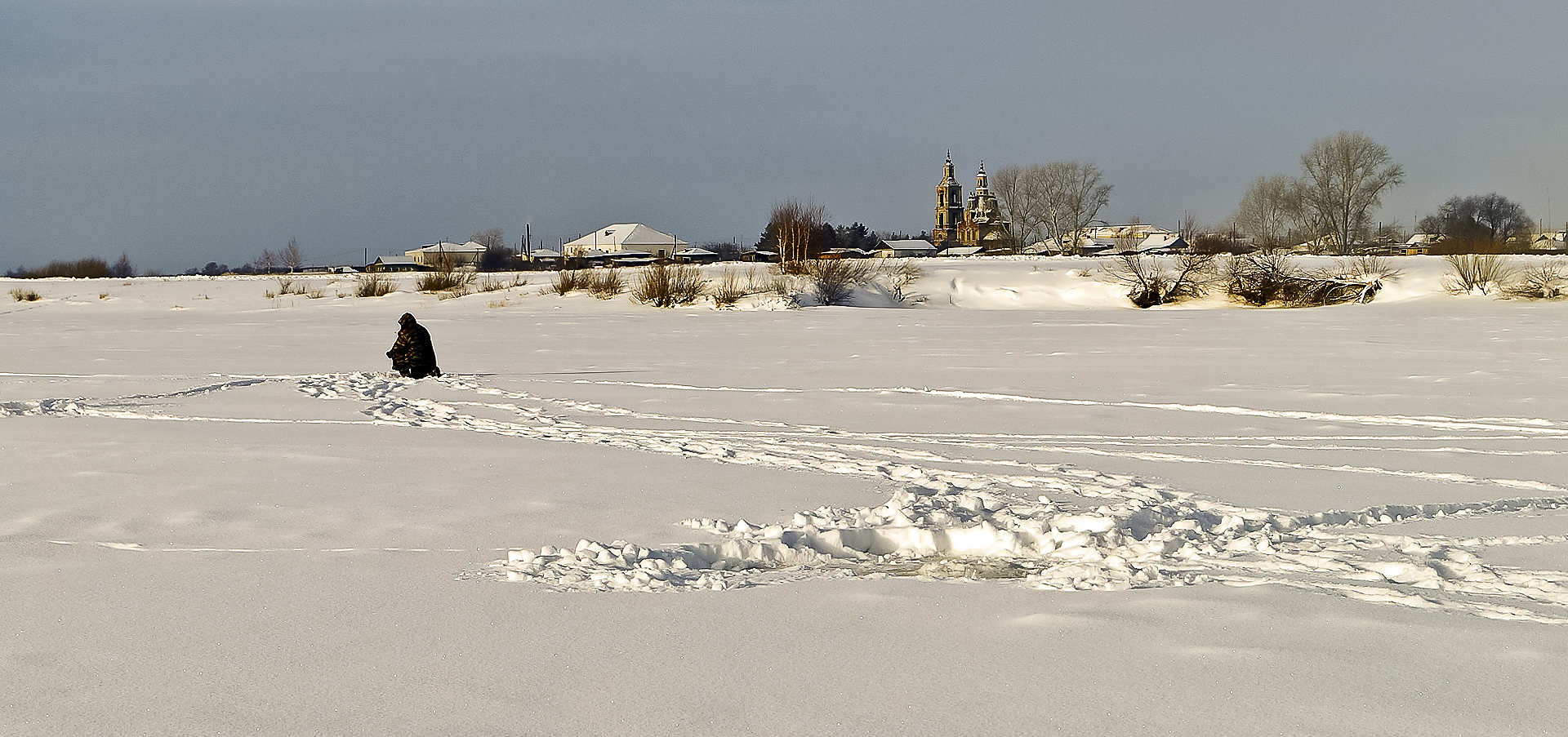
- Church and landscape in Shchuchansky District

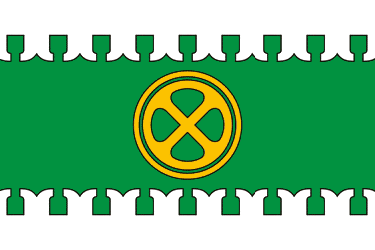
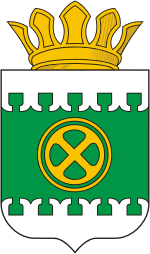
- Flag Coat of arms
- Location of Shchuchansky District in Kurgan Oblast
- Coordinates: 55°13′00″N 62°46′00″E
- Country: Russia
- Federal subject: Kurgan Oblast
- Established: 1923
- Administrative center: Shchuchye

Area
  - Total: 2,809 km^{2} (1,085 sq mi)

Population (2010 Census)
  - Total: 23,547
  - Density: 8.383/km^{2} (21.71/sq mi)
  - Urban: 46.6%
  - Rural: 53.4%

Administrative structure
  - Administrative divisions: 1 Towns under district jurisdiction, 16 Selsoviets
  - Inhabited localities: 1 cities/towns, 53 rural localities

Municipal structure
  - Municipally incorporated as: Shchuchansky Municipal District
  - Municipal divisions: 1 urban settlements, 16 rural settlements
- Time zone: UTC+5 (MSK+2)
- OKTMO ID: 37644000
- Website: http://43025.ucoz.ru/

Shchuchansky District (Russian: Щу́чанский райо́н) is an administrative and municipal district (raion), one of the twenty-four in Kurgan Oblast, Russia. It is located in the west of the oblast. The area of the district is 2,809 square kilometers (1,085 sq mi). Its administrative center is the town of Shchuchye. Population: 23,547 (2010 census); 26,392 (2002 Census); 30,743 (1989 Soviet census). The population of Shchuchye accounts for 46.6% of the district's total population.
