= Logunov =

Logunov, feminine: Logunova (Russian: Логунов, Логунова) is a Russian-language surname. Notable people with the name include:

- Anatoly Logunov, Russian theoretical physicist
- Aleksandr Logunov (footballer) (born 1996), Russian football player
- Tatiana Logunova, Russian épée fencer
- Dmitri Logunov, a Russian and British biologist, curator of arthropods in Manchester Museum
