= Shchuchye, Shchuchansky District, Kurgan Oblast =

Town in Kurgan Oblast, Russia

Shchuchye Щучье
- Town
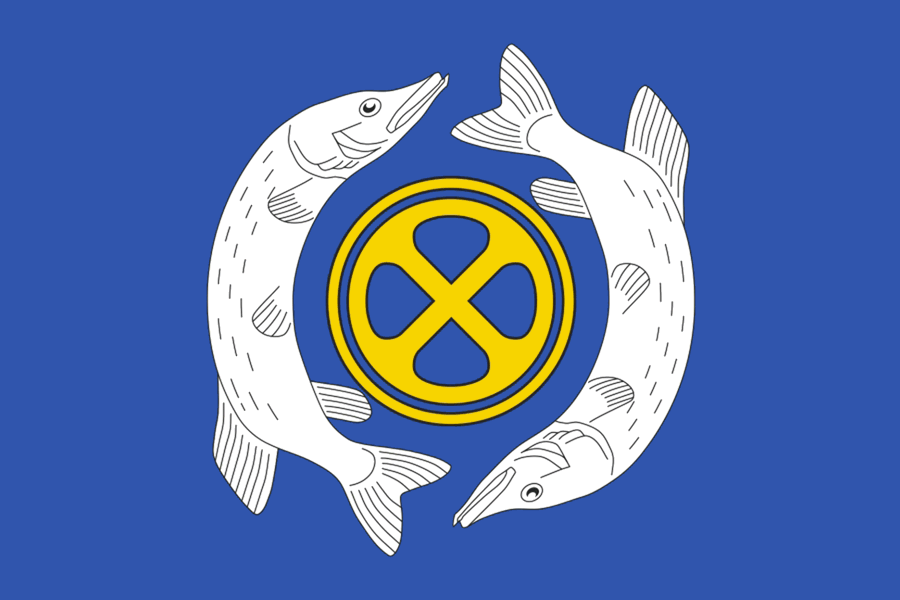
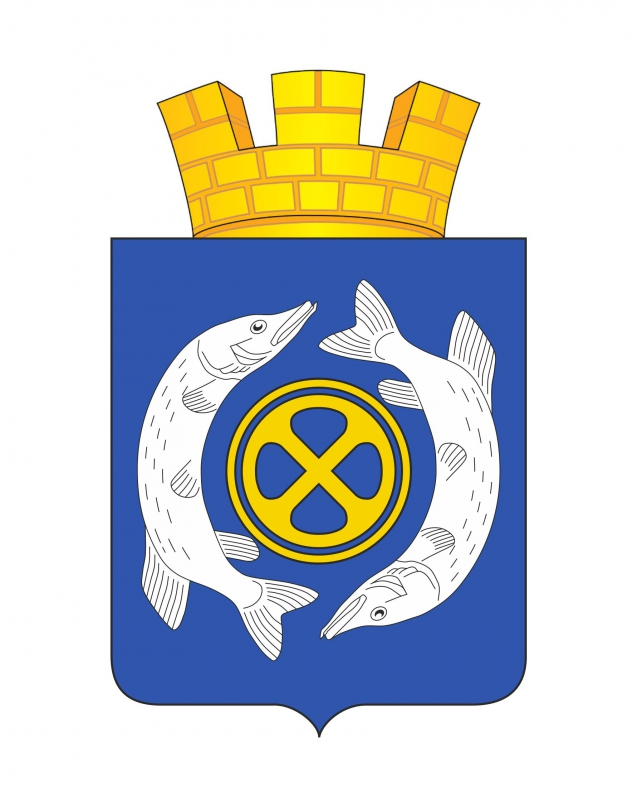
- Flag Coat of arms
- Interactive map of Shchuchye
- Location of Shchuchye Shchuchye (Kurgan Oblast)
- Coordinates: 55°13′N 62°45′E
- Country: Russia
- Federal subject: Kurgan Oblast
- Administrative district: Shchuchansky District
- Town under district jurisdictionSelsoviet: Shchuchye
- Known since: 1750
- Town status since: 1945
- Elevation: 165 m (541 ft)

Population (2010 Census)
  - Total: 10,973
  - Estimate (2025): 7,831 (−28.6%)

Administrative status
  - Capital of: Shchuchansky District, Shchuchye Town Under District Jurisdiction

Municipal status
  - Municipal district: Shchuchansky Municipal District
  - Urban settlement: Shchuchye Urban Settlement
  - Capital of: Shchuchansky Municipal District, Shchuchye Urban Settlement
- Time zone: UTC+5 (MSK+2)
- Postal code: 641010
- OKTMO ID: 37644101001
- Website: xn----ftbdb1cant0bs9a.xn--p1ai

Shchuchye (Russian: Щу́чье) is a town and the administrative center of Shchuchansky District in Kurgan Oblast, Russia, located on Lake Shchuchye, 180 kilometers (110 mi) west of Kurgan, the administrative center of the oblast. Population: 10,973 (2010 census); 10,602 (2002 census); 11,094 (1989 Soviet census).

== History ==
It has been known since 1750 as a selo and was granted town status in 1945.

== Administrative and municipal status ==
Within the framework of administrative divisions, Shchuchye serves as the administrative center of Shchuchansky District. As an administrative division, it is incorporated within Shchuchansky District as Shchuchye Town Under District Jurisdiction. As a municipal division, Shchuchye Town Under District Jurisdiction is incorporated within Shchuchansky Municipal District as Shchuchye Urban Settlement.

== Military ==
About 14% of Russian chemical weapons were stored at Shchuchye. However under the Chemical Weapons Convention a new facility to destroy these chemical weapons was opened there in May 2009, with the financial help of the United Kingdom, Sweden and the Czech Republic, as well as the US-supported Nunn-Lugar program. The destruction and decontamination of the Shchuchye stockpile was completed in 2015.
