= Mishkino, Kurgan Oblast =

Mishkino Мишкино
- Urban-type settlement
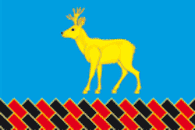
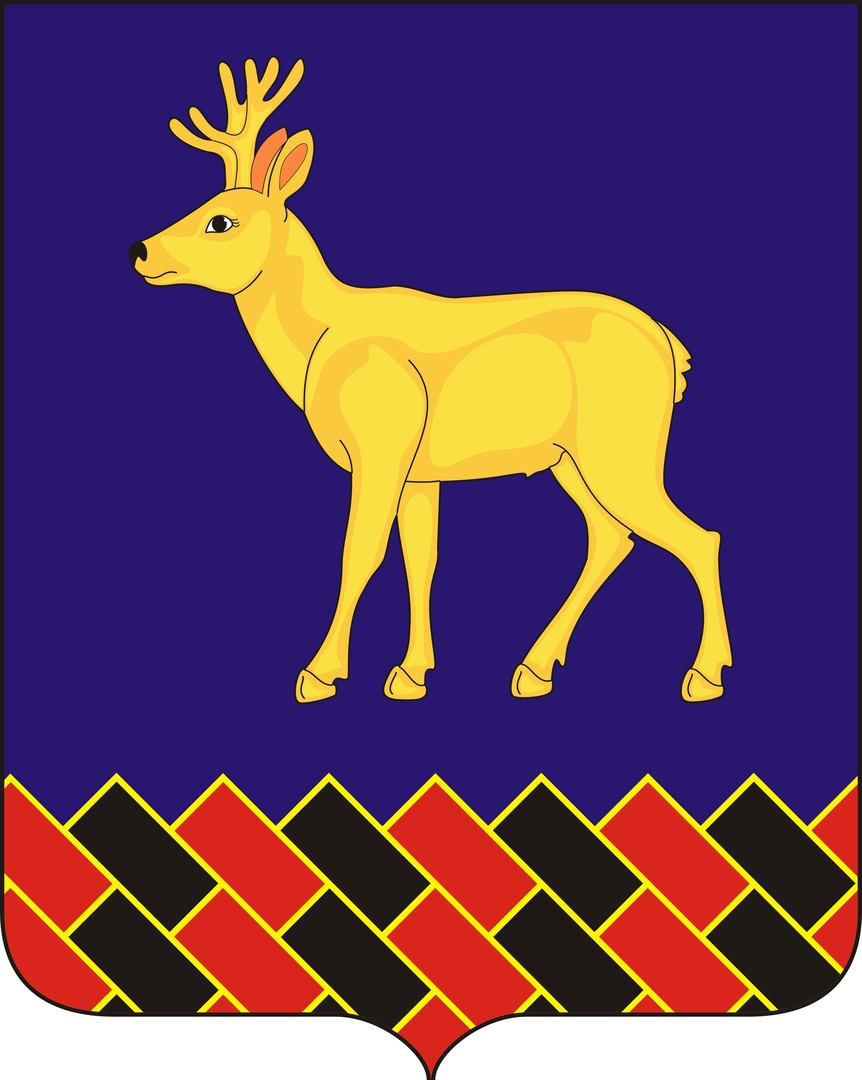
- Flag Coat of arms
- Interactive map of Mishkino
- Location of Mishkino Mishkino (Kurgan Oblast)
- Coordinates: 55.3415°N 63.9074°E
- Country: Russia
- Federal subject: Kurgan Oblast
- Administrative district: Mishkinsky District
- Founded: 1798

Population (2010 Census)
  - Total: 8,034
  - Estimate (2025): 6,396 (−20.4%)
- Time zone: UTC+5 (MSK+2)
- Postal code: 641040
- OKTMO ID: 37622151051

Mishkino (Russian: Мишкино) is an urban locality (an urban-type settlement) in Mishkinsky District of Kurgan Oblast, Russia. Population: 8,034 (2010 census); 8,914 (2002 census); 9,507 (1989 Soviet census).
