= Polovinnoye, Polovinsky District, Kurgan Oblast =

Rural locality in Kurgan Oblast, Russia

Coordinates: 54°47′37″N 65°58′57″E

Polovinnoye (Russian: Половинное) is a rural locality (a selo) and the administrative center of Polovinsky District, Kurgan Oblast, Russia. Population: 4,645 (2010 census); 5,221 (2002 census); 5,117 (1989 Soviet census).
