= Mokrousovo, Republic of Bashkortostan =

Mokrousovo Мокроусово
- Village
- Location within Bashkortostan Location within Russia
- Coordinates: 54°34′N 55°56′E
- Country: Russia
- Region: Bashkortostan
- District: Ufa
- Time zone: UTC+5:00

Mokrousovo (Russian: Мокроусово) is a rural locality (a village) in Ufa, Bashkortostan, Russia. Its population was 228 as of 2010. It has four streets.

== Geography ==
Mokrousovo is located 21 km south of Ufa. Urshak is the nearest rural locality.
