= Kataysk, Kurgan Oblast =

Town in Kurgan Oblast, Russia

Kataysk Катайск
- Town
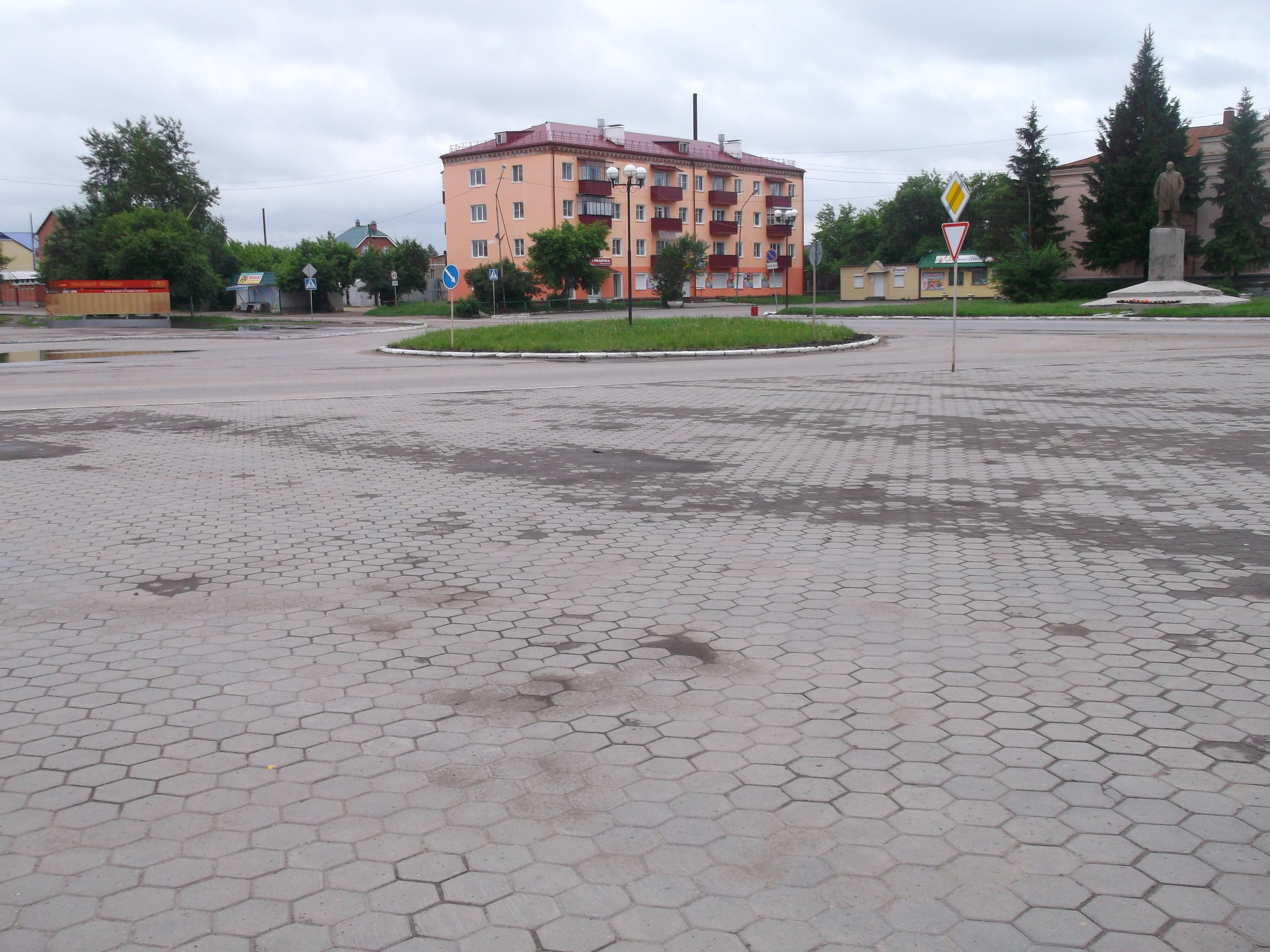
- Kaytaysk

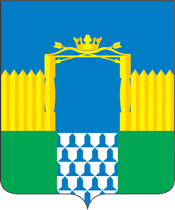
- Coat of arms
- Interactive map of Kataysk
- Location of Kataysk Kataysk (Kurgan Oblast)
- Coordinates: 56°18′N 62°36′E
- Country: Russia
- Federal subject: Kurgan Oblast
- Administrative district: Kataysky District
- Town under district jurisdictionSelsoviet: Kataysk
- Founded: 1655
- Town status since: 1944
- Elevation: 100 m (330 ft)

Population (2010 Census)
  - Total: 14,003
  - Estimate (2025): 11,309 (−19.2%)

Administrative status
  - Capital of: Kataysky District, Kataysk Town Under District Jurisdiction

Municipal status
  - Municipal district: Kataysky Municipal District
  - Urban settlement: Kataysk Urban Settlement
  - Capital of: Kataysky Municipal District, Kataysk Urban Settlement
- Time zone: UTC+5 (MSK+2)
- Postal codes: 641700–641703, 641705, 641706
- OKTMO ID: 37612101001
- Website: gorodkataysk.ru

Kataysk (Russian: Ката́йск) is a town and the administrative center of Kataysky District in Kurgan Oblast, Russia, located on the Iset River 214 kilometers (133 mi) northwest of Kurgan, the administrative center of the oblast. Population: 14,003 (2010 census); 15,836 (2002 census); 16,789 (1989 Soviet census).

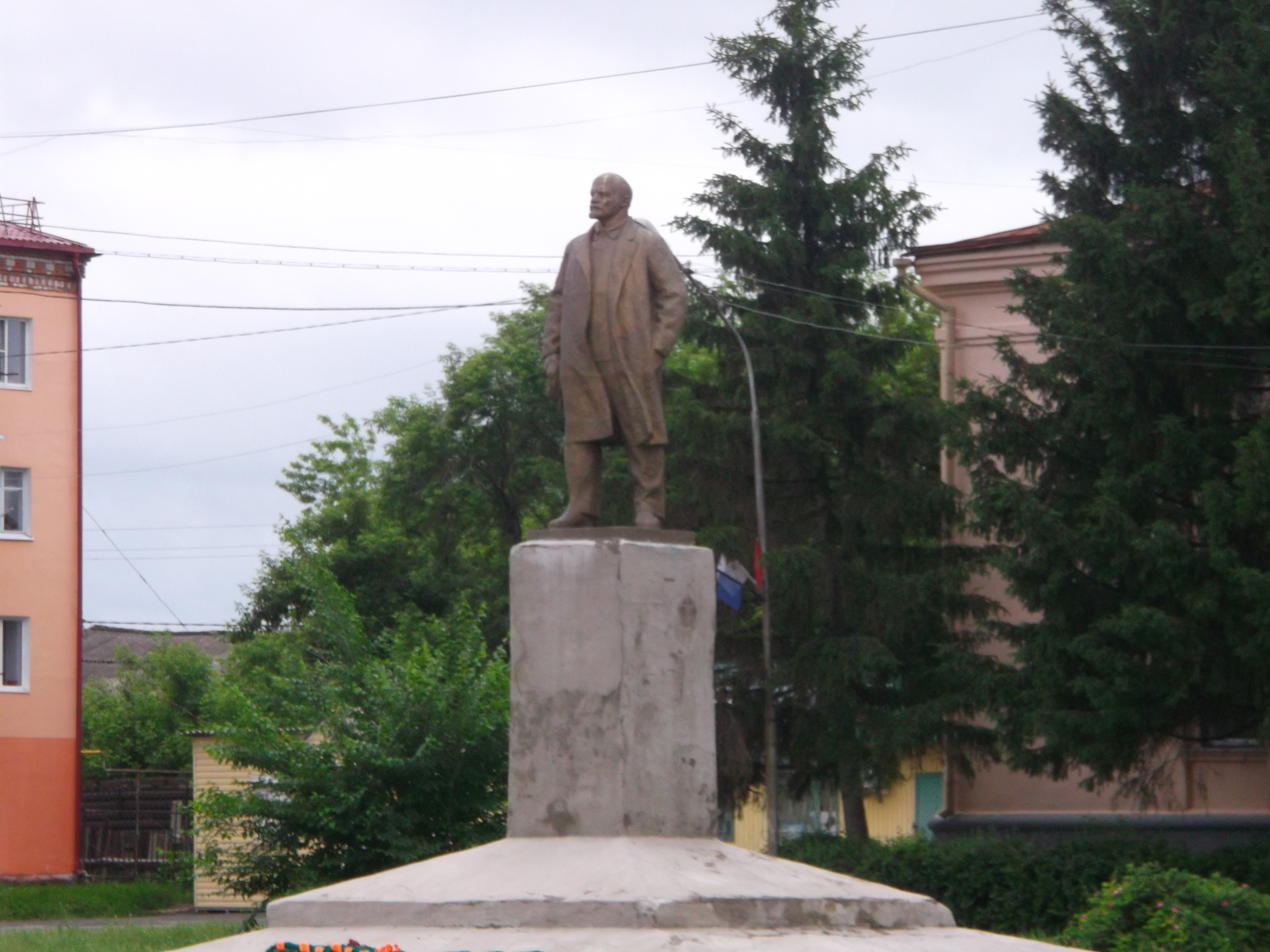
Monument to V.I. Lenin

== History ==
It was founded in 1655 by Imperial Russia as Kataysky (Катайский). It was granted town status in 1944.

== Administrative and municipal status ==
Within the framework of administrative divisions, Kataysk serves as the administrative center of Kataysky District. As an administrative division, it is incorporated within Kataysky District as Kataysk Town Under District Jurisdiction. As a municipal division, Kataysk Town Under District Jurisdiction is incorporated within Kataysky Municipal District as Kataysk Urban Settlement.

== Notable people associated with the city ==
- Maria Lagunova, World War II Soviet woman tank driver, honorary citizen of the city
