= Mishkinsky District, Kurgan Oblast =

Mishkinsky District Мишкинский район (Russian)
- District
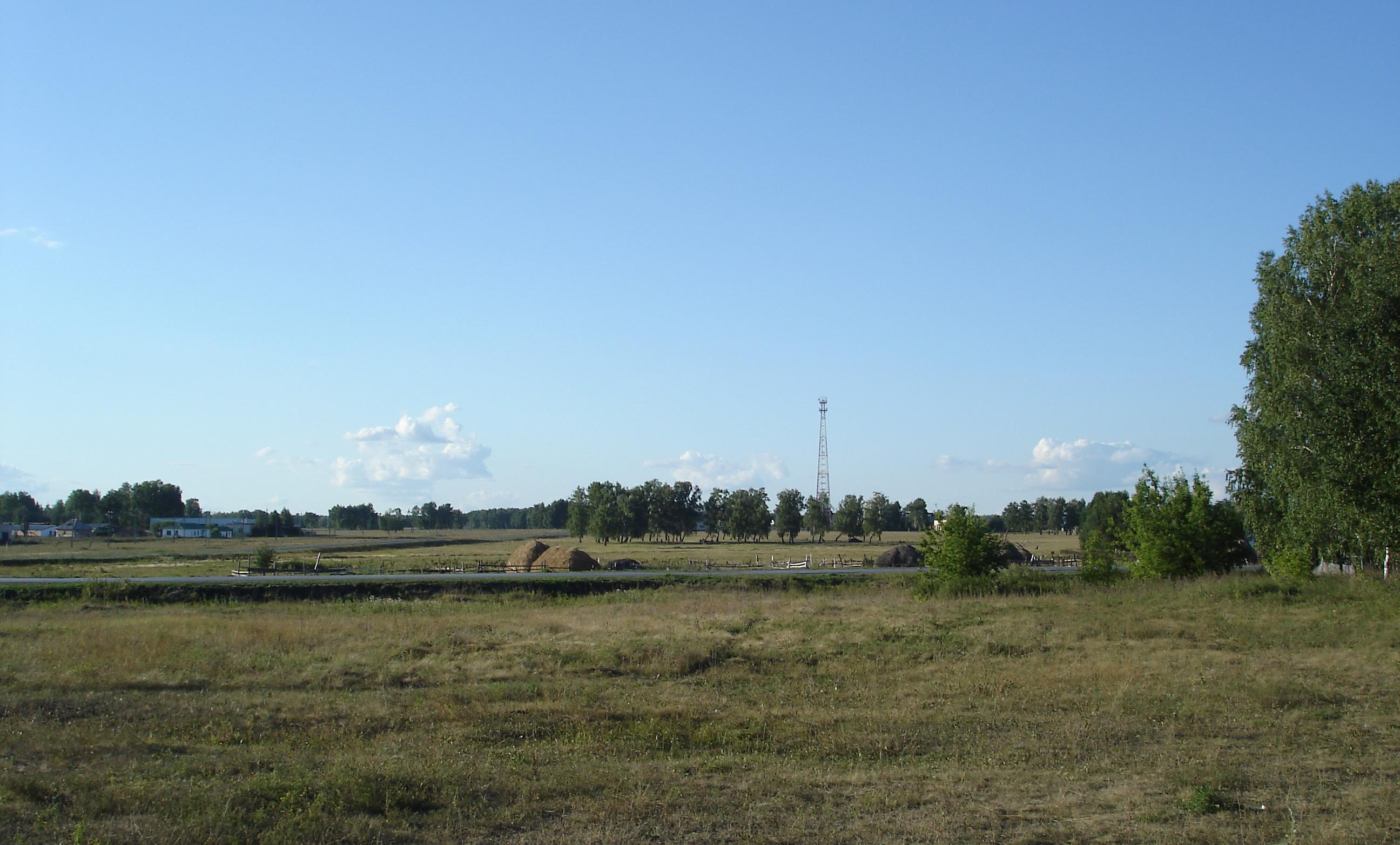
- Outskirts of Mishkino, Mishkinsky District

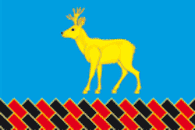
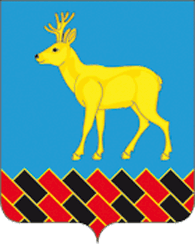
- Flag Coat of arms
- Location of Mishkinsky District in Kurgan Oblast
- Coordinates: 55°20′20″N 63°55′03″E
- Country: Russia
- Federal subject: Kurgan Oblast
- Established: 1924
- Administrative center: Mishkino

Area
  - Total: 3,050 km^{2} (1,180 sq mi)

Population (2010 Census)
  - Total: 17,684
  - Density: 5.80/km^{2} (15.0/sq mi)
  - Urban: 45.4%
  - Rural: 54.6%

Administrative structure
  - Administrative divisions: 1 Urban-type settlements under district jurisdiction, 17 Selsoviets
  - Inhabited localities: 1 urban-type settlements, 52 rural localities

Municipal structure
  - Municipally incorporated as: Mishkinsky Municipal District
  - Municipal divisions: 1 urban settlements, 17 rural settlements
- Time zone: UTC+5 (MSK+2)
- OKTMO ID: 37622000
- Website: http://mishkino.kurganobl.ru/

Mishkinsky District (Russian: Мишкинский райо́н) is an administrative and municipal district (raion), one of the twenty-four in Kurgan Oblast, Russia. It is located in the center of the oblast. The area of the district is 3,050 square kilometers (1,180 sq mi). Its administrative center is the urban locality (an urban-type settlement) of Mishkino. Population: 17,684 (2010 census); 22,076 (2002 Census); 26,444 (1989 Soviet census). The population of Mishkino accounts for 45.4% of the district's total population.
