= Dalmatovsky District =

District in Kurgan Oblast, Russia

Dalmatovsky District Далматовский район (Russian)
- District
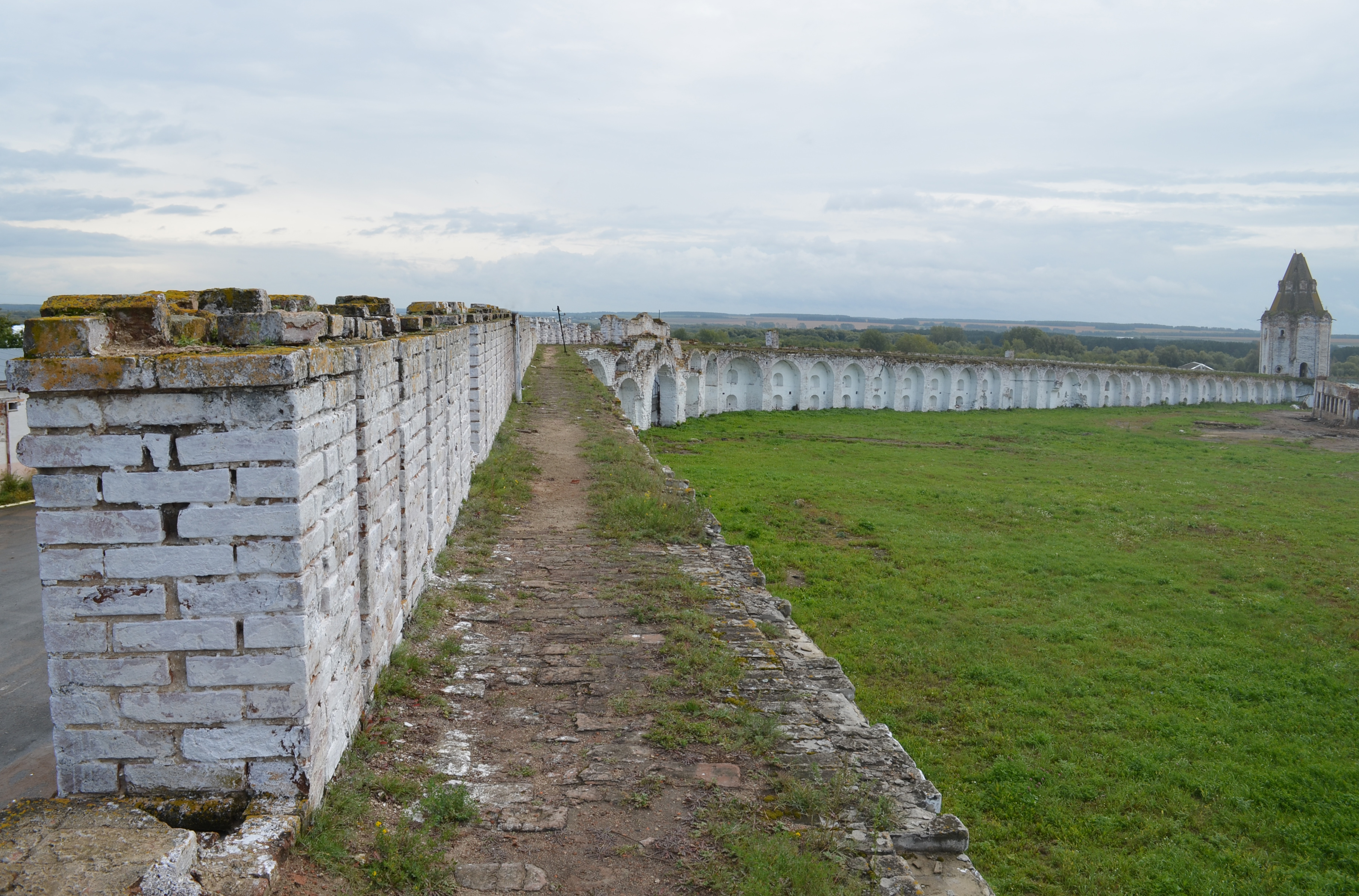
- West Tower, Dalmatovsky Monastery, Dalmatovsky District

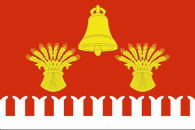
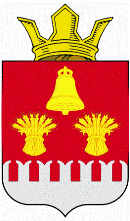
- Flag Coat of arms
- Location of Dalmatovsky District in Kurgan Oblast
- Coordinates: 56°16′N 62°55′E
- Country: Russia
- Federal subject: Kurgan Oblast
- Established: 3 November 1923
- Administrative center: Dalmatovo

Area
  - Total: 3,530 km^{2} (1,360 sq mi)

Population (2010 Census)
  - Total: 29,476
  - Density: 8.35/km^{2} (21.6/sq mi)
  - Urban: 47.2%
  - Rural: 52.8%

Administrative structure
  - Administrative divisions: 1 Towns under district jurisdiction, 25 Selsoviets
  - Inhabited localities: 1 cities/towns, 59 rural localities

Municipal structure
  - Municipally incorporated as: Dalmatovsky Municipal District
  - Municipal divisions: 1 urban settlements, 25 rural settlements
- Time zone: UTC+5 (MSK+2)
- OKTMO ID: 37608000
- Website: http://www.dalmatovo.su/

Dalmatovsky District (Russian: Далма́товский райо́н) is an administrative and municipal district (raion), one of the twenty-four in Kurgan Oblast, Russia. It is located in the northwest of the oblast. The area of the district is 3,530 square kilometers (1,360 sq mi). Its administrative center is the town of Dalmatovo. Population: 29,476 (2010 census); 35,176 (2002 Census); 39,785 (1989 Soviet census). The population of Dalmatovo accounts for 47.2% of the district's total population.
