= Yurgamysh =

Yurgamysh Юргамыш
- Urban-type settlement
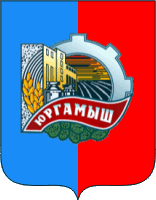
- Coat of arms
- Interactive map of Yurgamysh
- Location of Yurgamysh Yurgamysh (Kurgan Oblast)
- Coordinates: 55.3753°N 64.4567°E
- Country: Russia
- Federal subject: Kurgan Oblast
- Administrative district: Yurgamyshsky District
- Founded: 1891

Population (2010 Census)
  - Total: 7,616
  - Estimate (2025): 6,358 (−16.5%)
- Time zone: UTC+5 (MSK+2)
- Postal code: 641200
- OKTMO ID: 37646151051

Yurgamysh (Russian: Юргамыш) is an urban locality (an urban-type settlement) in Yurgamyshsky District of Kurgan Oblast, Russia. Population: 7,616 (2010 census); 8,070 (2002 census); 9,078 (1989 Soviet census).
