= Yurgamyshsky District =

Yurgamyshsky District Юргамышский район (Russian)
- District
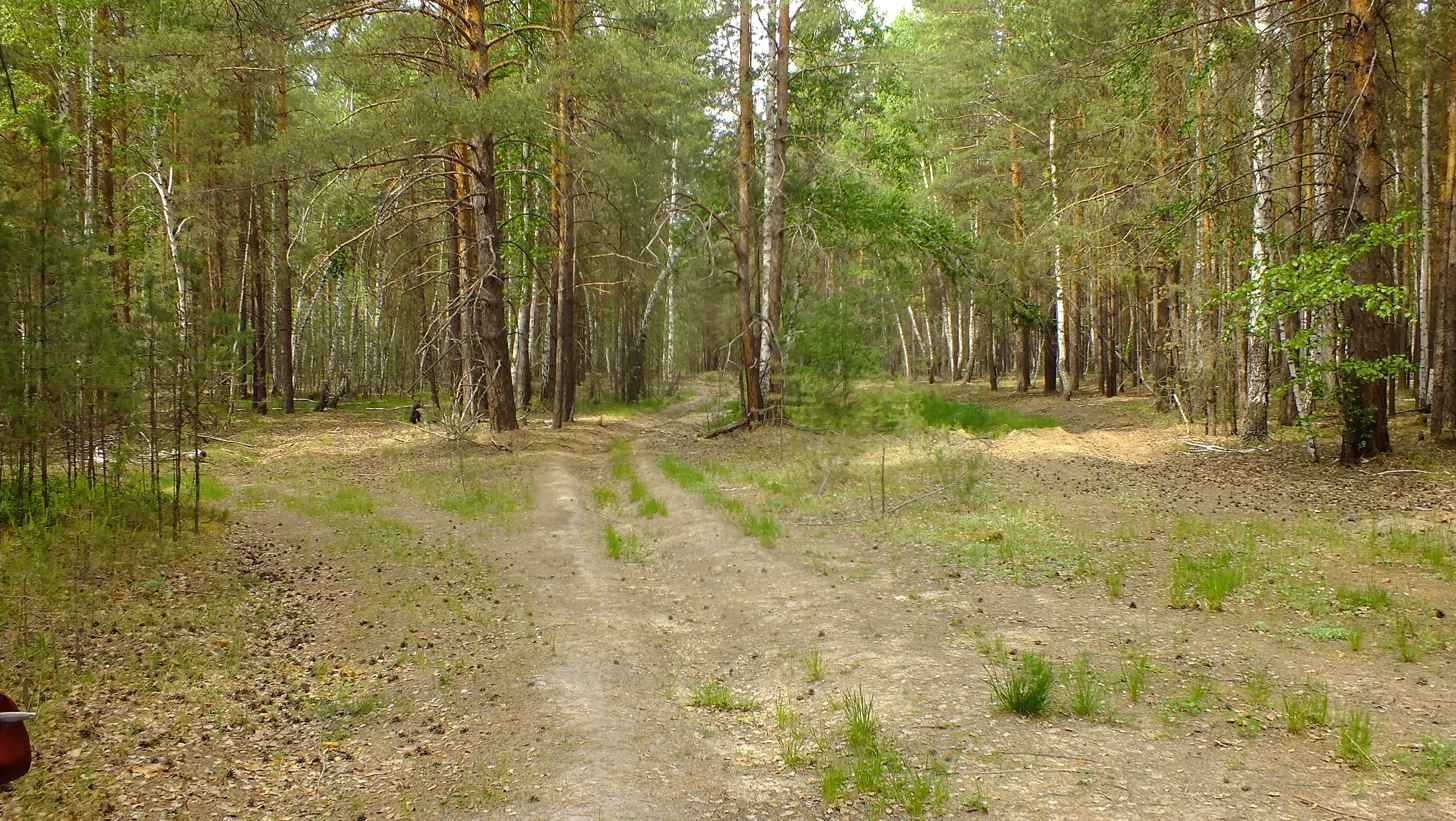
- Road through a forest clearing, Yurgamyshsky District

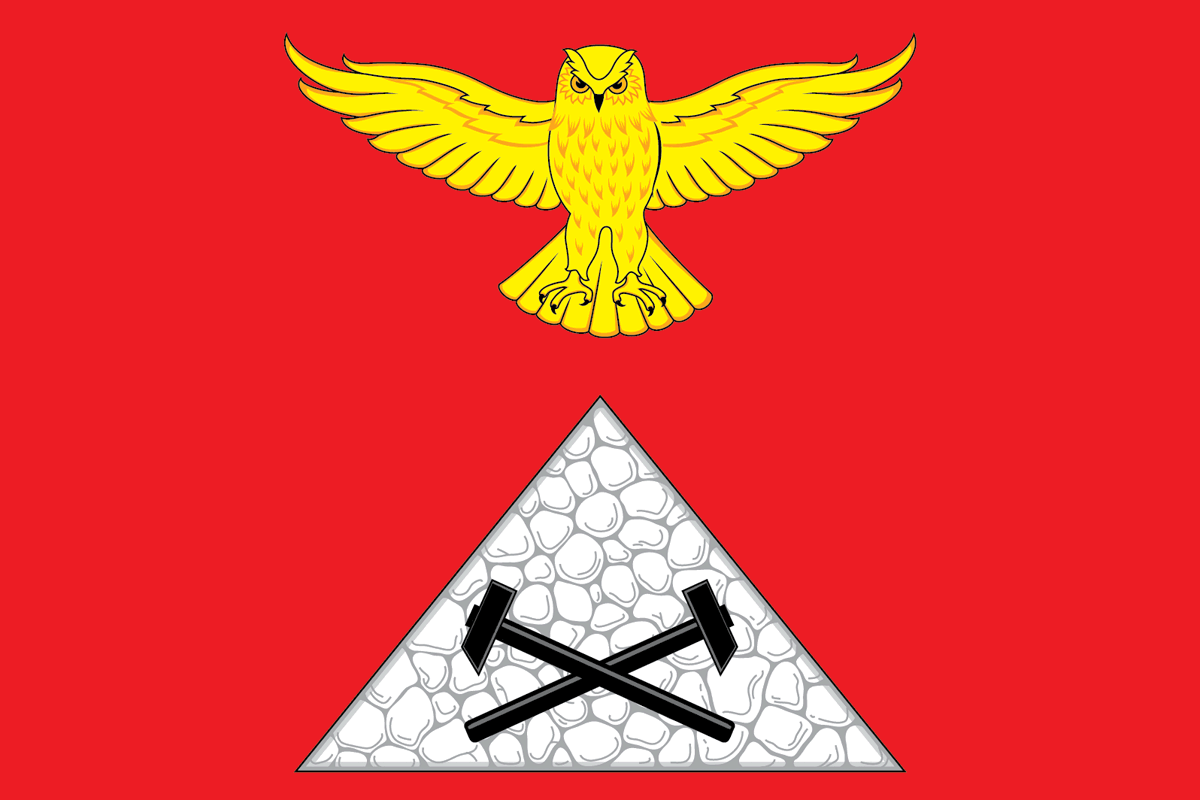
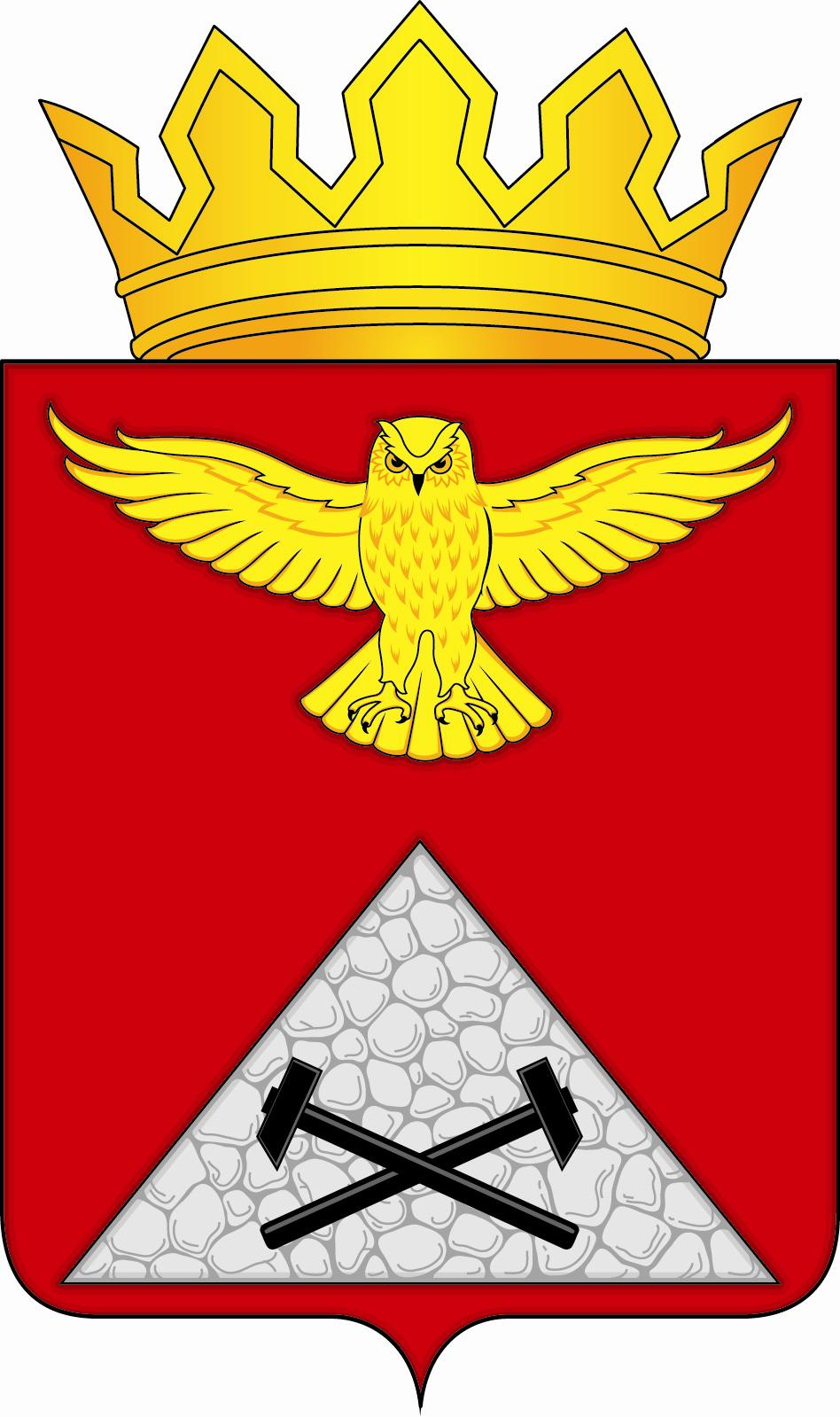
- Flag Coat of arms
- Location of Yurgamyshsky District in Kurgan Oblast
- Coordinates: 55°24′N 64°30′E
- Country: Russia
- Federal subject: Kurgan Oblast
- Established: 1924
- Administrative center: Yurgamysh

Area
  - Total: 2,600 km^{2} (1,000 sq mi)

Population (2010 Census)
  - Total: 20,886
  - Density: 8.0/km^{2} (21/sq mi)
  - Urban: 36.5%
  - Rural: 63.5%

Administrative structure
  - Administrative divisions: 1 Urban-type settlements under district jurisdiction, 14 Selsoviets
  - Inhabited localities: 1 urban-type settlements, 64 rural localities

Municipal structure
  - Municipally incorporated as: Yurgamyshsky Municipal District
  - Municipal divisions: 1 urban settlements, 14 rural settlements
- Time zone: UTC+5 (MSK+2)
- OKTMO ID: 37646000
- Website: http://www.adm.yurgamysh.ru/

Yurgamyshsky District (Russian: Юргамы́шский райо́н) is an administrative and municipal district (raion), one of the twenty-four in Kurgan Oblast, Russia. It is located in the center of the oblast. The area of the district is 2,600 square kilometers (1,000 sq mi). Its administrative center is the urban locality (an urban-type settlement) of Yurgamysh. Population: 20,886 (2010 census); 24,666 (2002 Census); 26,703 (1989 Soviet census). The population of Yurgamysh accounts for 36.5% of the district's total population.
