= Shumikhinsky District =

District in Kurgan Oblast, Russia

Shumikhinsky District Шумихинский район (Russian)
- District
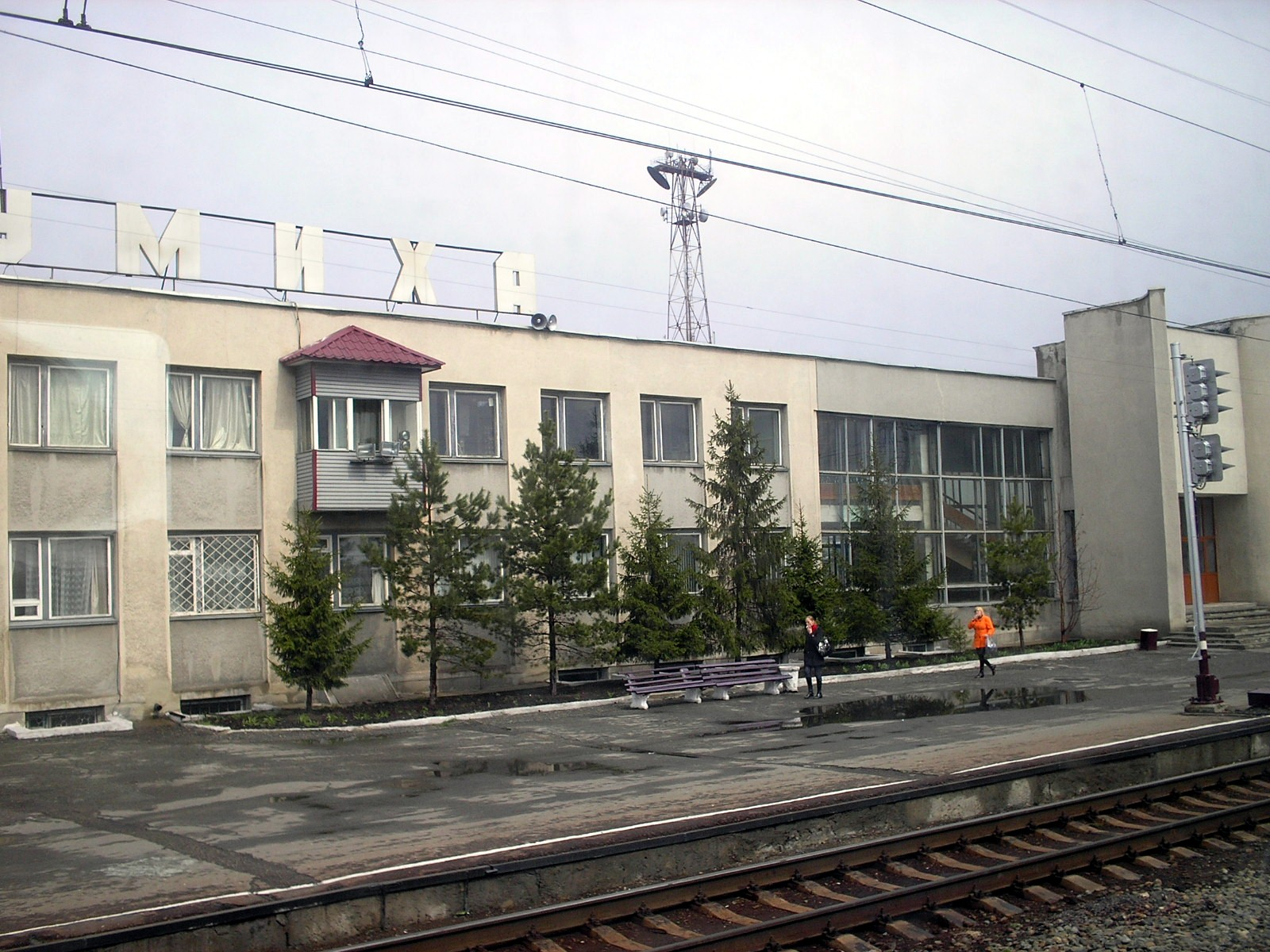
- Shumikha train station, Shumikhinsky District

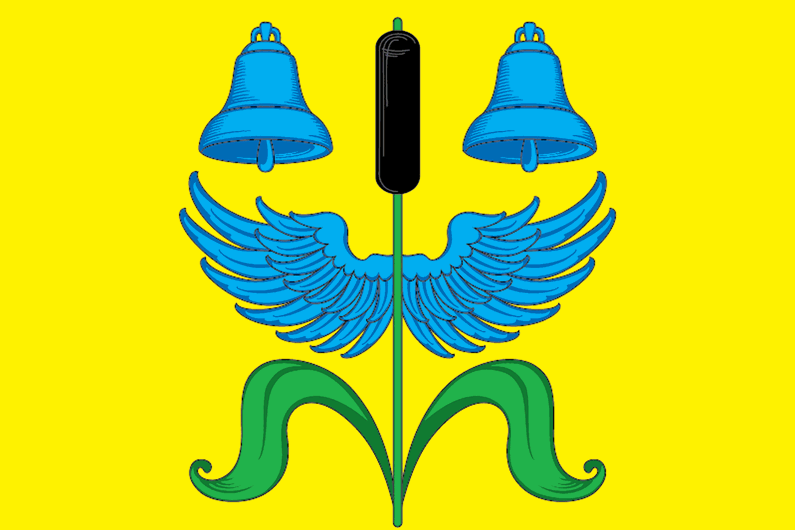
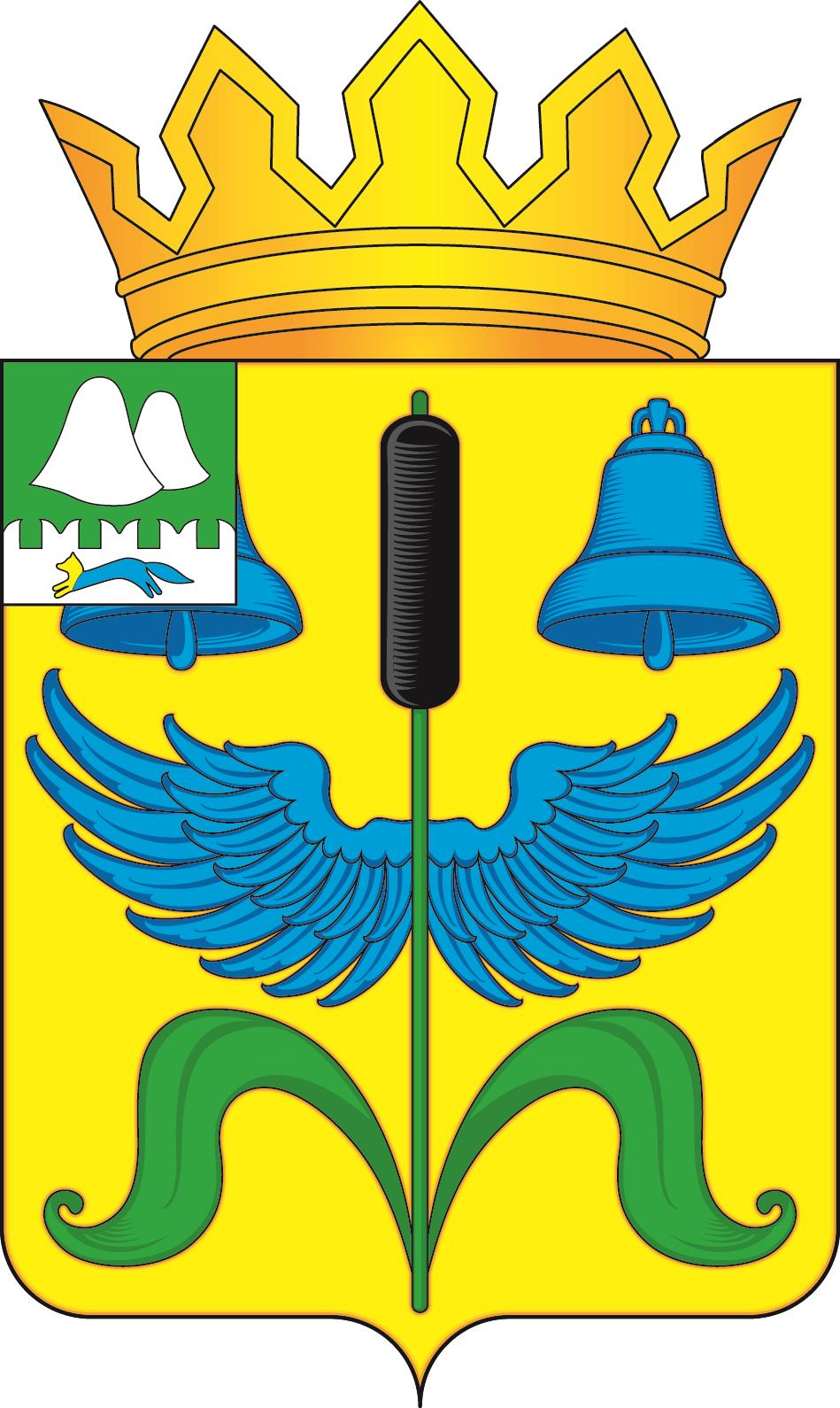
- Flag Coat of arms
- Location of Shumikhinsky District in Kurgan Oblast
- Coordinates: 55°15′N 63°15′E
- Country: Russia
- Federal subject: Kurgan Oblast
- Established: 1924
- Administrative center: Shumikha

Area
  - Total: 2,809 km^{2} (1,085 sq mi)

Population (2010 Census)
  - Total: 28,499
  - Density: 10.15/km^{2} (26.28/sq mi)
  - Urban: 62.5%
  - Rural: 37.5%

Administrative structure
  - Administrative divisions: 1 Towns under district jurisdiction, 16 Selsoviets
  - Inhabited localities: 1 cities/towns, 45 rural localities

Municipal structure
  - Municipally incorporated as: Shumikhinsky Municipal District
  - Municipal divisions: 1 urban settlements, 16 rural settlements
- Time zone: UTC+5 (MSK+2)
- OKTMO ID: 37642000
- Website: http://xn--45-8kc5at5bqu.xn--p1ai/munitcipal-nye-uslugi.html

Shumikhinsky District (Russian: Шуми́хинский райо́н) is an administrative and municipal district (raion), one of the twenty-four in Kurgan Oblast, Russia. It is located in the west of the oblast. The area of the district is 2,809 square kilometers (1,085 sq mi). Its administrative center is the town of Shumikha. Population: 28,499 (2010 census); 33,051 (2002 Census); 38,122 (1989 Soviet census). The population of Shumikha accounts for 62.5% of the district's total population.
