= Vargashi (urban-type settlement) =

Urban-type settlement in Kurgan Oblast, Russia

Vargashi Варгаши
- Urban-type settlement
- Interactive map of Vargashi
- Location of Vargashi Vargashi (Kurgan Oblast)
- Coordinates: 55.3724°N 65.8098°E
- Country: Russia
- Federal subject: Kurgan Oblast
- Administrative district: Vargashinsky District
- Founded: 1894

Population (2010 Census)
  - Total: 9,254
  - Estimate (2025): 8,235 (−11%)
- Time zone: UTC+5 (MSK+2)
- Postal codes: 641230, 641231
- OKTMO ID: 37606151051

Vargashi (Russian: Варгаши) is an urban locality (an urban-type settlement) in Vargashinsky District of Kurgan Oblast, Russia. Population: 9,254 (2010 census); 9,953 (2002 census); 9,889 (1989 Soviet census).
