= Mokrousovo, Kurgan Oblast =

Rural locality in Kurgan Oblast, Russia

Coordinates: 55°48′28″N 66°46′14″E

Mokrousovo (Russian: Мокроусово) is a rural locality (a selo) and the administrative center of Mokrousovsky District, Kurgan Oblast, Russia. Population: 4,849 (2010 census); 4,963 (2002 census); 5,105 (1989 Soviet census).
