= Kargapolye (urban-type settlement) =

Urban-type settlement in Kurgan Oblast, Russia

Kargapolye Каргаполье
- Urban-type settlement
- Interactive map of Kargapolye
- Location of Kargapolye Kargapolye (Kurgan Oblast)
- Coordinates: 55.9522°N 64.4354°E
- Country: Russia
- Federal subject: Kurgan Oblast
- Administrative district: Kargapolsky District
- Elevation: 77 m (253 ft)

Population (2010 Census)
  - Total: 8,433
  - Estimate (2025): 8,115 (−3.8%)
- Time zone: UTC+5 (MSK+2)
- Postal code: 641920
- OKTMO ID: 37610151051

Kargapolye (Russian: Каргаполье) is an urban locality (an urban-type settlement) in Kargapolsky District of Kurgan Oblast, Russia. Population: 8,433 (2010 census); 8,745 (2002 census); 10,037 (1989 Soviet census).

== Notable people ==
- Dumitru Diacov (born 1952), Moldovan politician
