= Lebyazhyevsky District =

Lebyazhyevsky District Лебяжьевский район (Russian)
- District
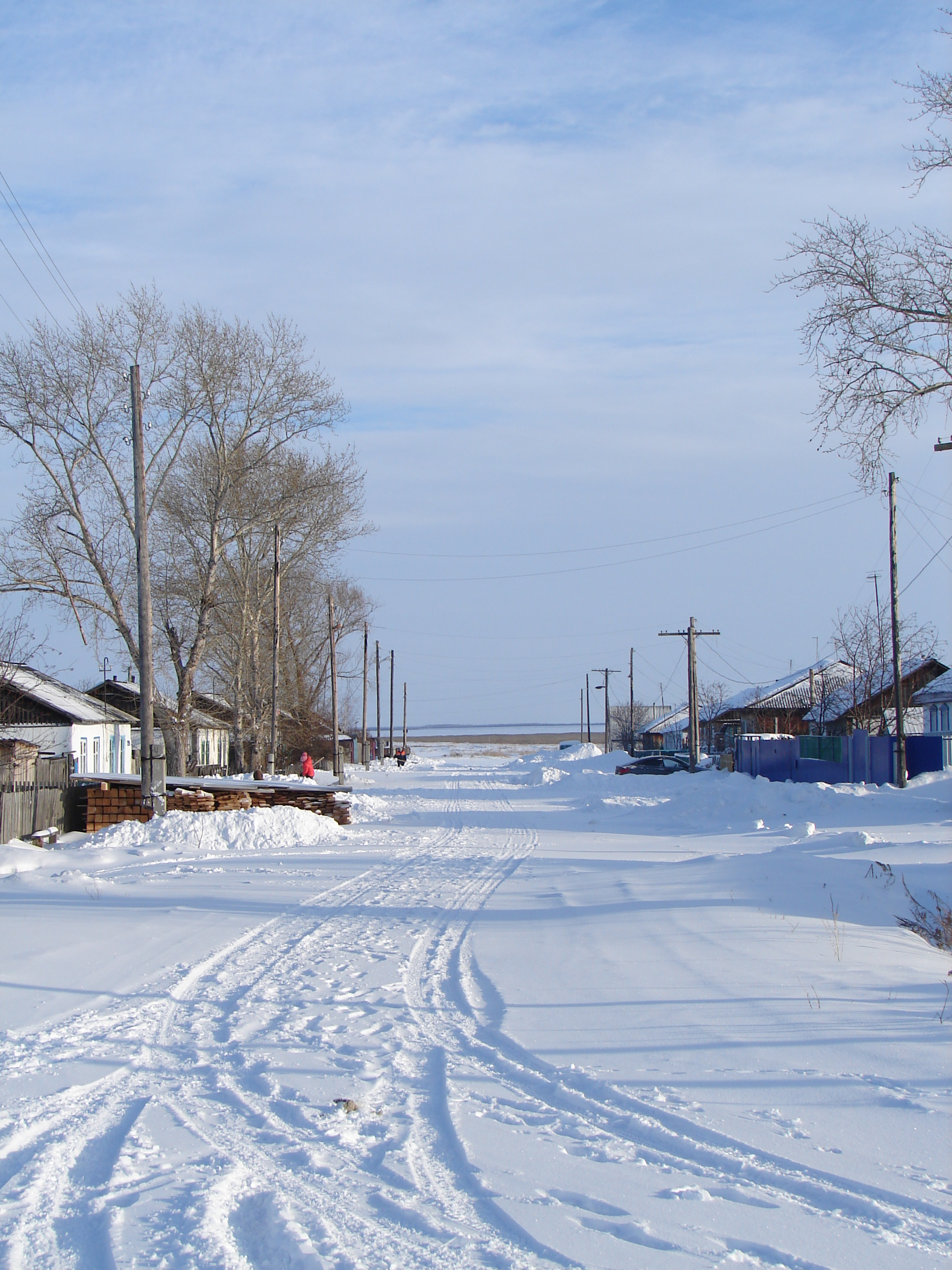
- Village Rechnoe, Lebyazhyevsky District

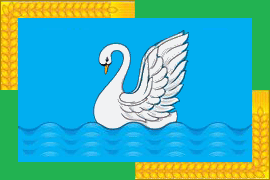
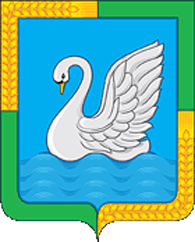
- Flag Coat of arms
- Location of Lebyazhyevsky District (in yellow) in Kurgan Oblast
- Coordinates: 55°16′N 66°30′E
- Country: Russia
- Federal subject: Kurgan Oblast
- Established: 1924
- Administrative center: Lebyazhye

Area
  - Total: 3,180 km^{2} (1,230 sq mi)

Population (2010 Census)
  - Total: 16,557
  - Density: 5.21/km^{2} (13.5/sq mi)
  - Urban: 39.0%
  - Rural: 61.0%

Administrative structure
  - Administrative divisions: 1 Urban-type settlements under district jurisdiction, 18 Selsoviets
  - Inhabited localities: 1 urban-type settlements, 49 rural localities

Municipal structure
  - Municipally incorporated as: Lebyazhyevsky Municipal District
  - Municipal divisions: 1 urban settlements, 18 rural settlements
- Time zone: UTC+5 (MSK+2)
- OKTMO ID: 37618000
- Website: http://lebadminist.ucoz.ru/

Lebyazhyevsky District (Russian: Лебя́жьевский райо́н) is an administrative and municipal district (raion), one of the twenty-four in Kurgan Oblast, Russia. It is located in the east of the oblast. The area of the district is 3,180 square kilometers (1,230 sq mi). Its administrative center is the urban locality (an urban-type settlement) of Lebyazhye. Population: 16,557 (2010 census); 21,178 (2002 Census); 23,490 (1989 Soviet census). The population of Lebyazhye accounts for 39.0% of the district's total population.
