= Kargapolsky District =

District in Kurgan Oblast, Russia

Kargapolsky District Каргапольский район (Russian)
- District
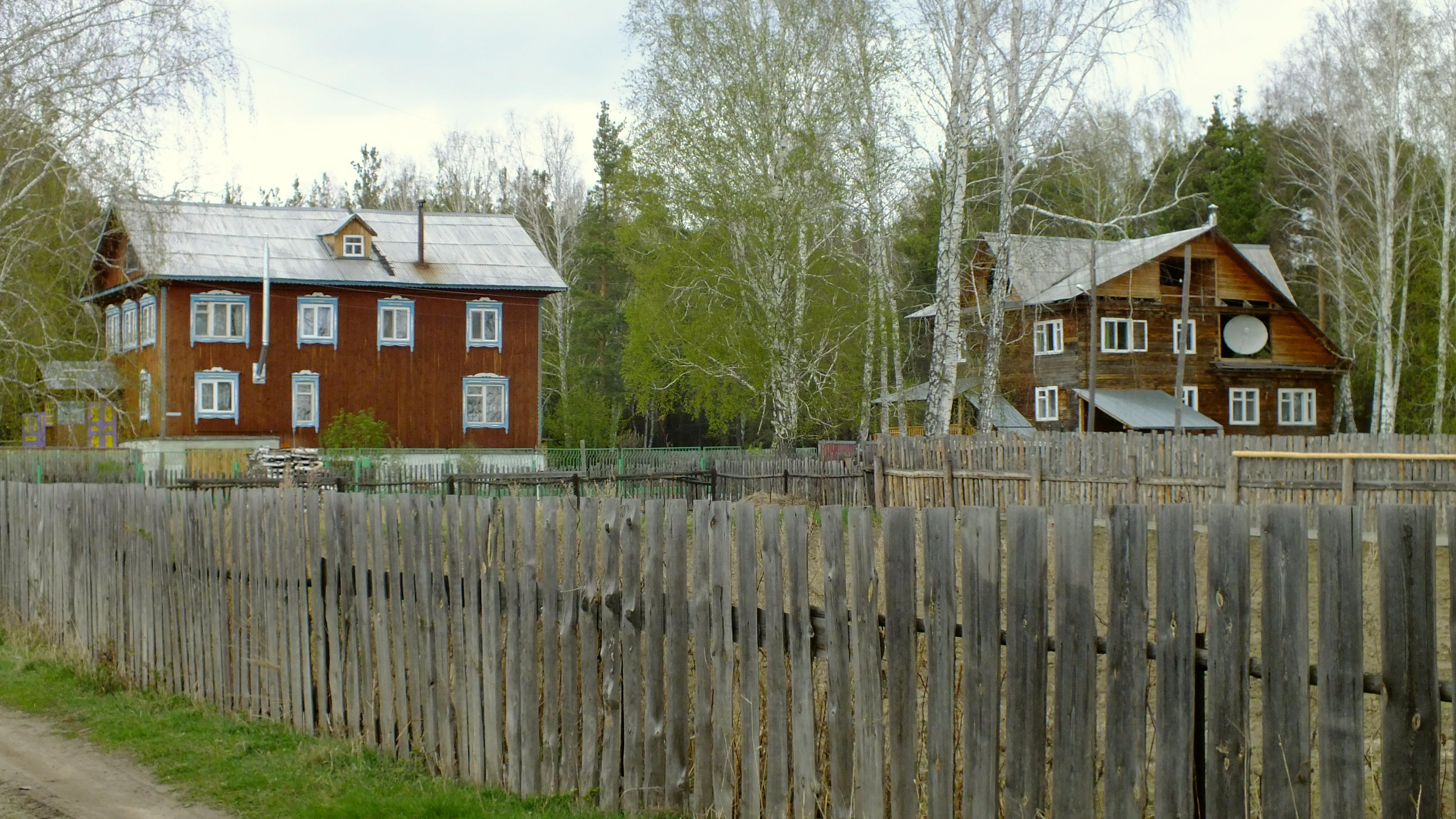
- Street view of Cooperative, Karapolsky District

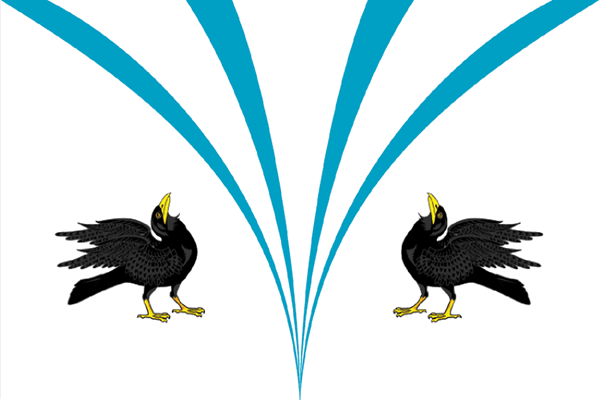
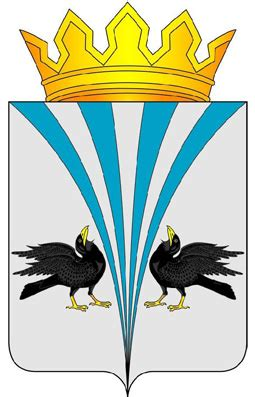
- Flag Coat of arms
- Location of Kargapolsky District in Kurgan Oblast
- Coordinates: 55°57′20″N 64°26′00″E
- Country: Russia
- Federal subject: Kurgan Oblast
- Established: 12 November 1923
- Administrative center: Kargopolye

Area
  - Total: 3,220 km^{2} (1,240 sq mi)

Population (2010 Census)
  - Total: 31,832
  - Density: 9.89/km^{2} (25.6/sq mi)
  - Urban: 39.8%
  - Rural: 60.2%

Administrative structure
  - Administrative divisions: 2 Urban-type settlements under district jurisdiction, 19 Selsoviets
  - Inhabited localities: 2 urban-type settlements, 84 rural localities

Municipal structure
  - Municipally incorporated as: Kargapolsky Municipal District
  - Municipal divisions: 2 urban settlements, 19 rural settlements
- Time zone: UTC+5 (MSK+2)
- OKTMO ID: 37610000
- Website: http://www.kargapolie-city.ru/

Kargapolsky District (Russian: Каргапольский райо́н) is an administrative and municipal district (raion), one of the twenty-four in Kurgan Oblast, Russia. It is located in the center of the oblast. The area of the district is 3,220 square kilometers (1,240 sq mi). Its administrative center is the urban locality (an urban-type settlement) of Kargapolye. Population: 31,832 (2010 census); 34,854 (2002 Census); 38,518 (1989 Soviet census). The population of Kargapolye accounts for 26.5% of the district's total population.
