= Kataysky District =

District in Kurgan Oblast, Russia

Kataysky District Катайский район (Russian)
- District
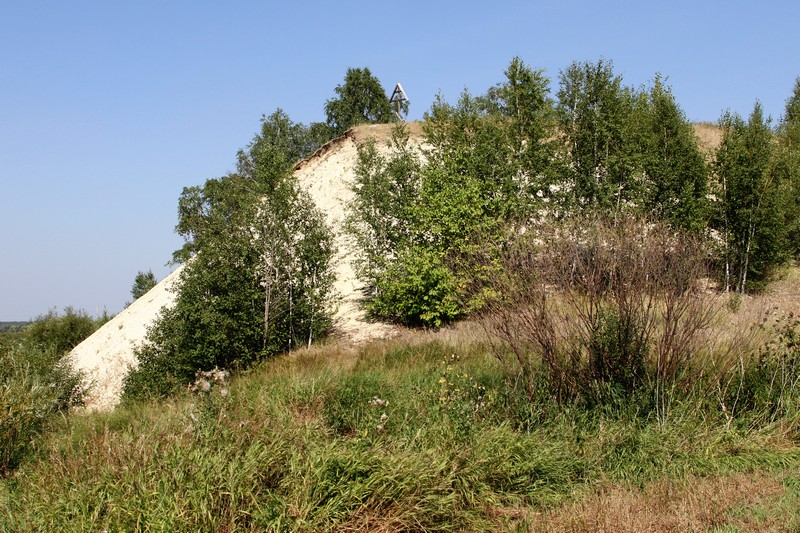
- Okhonin Brovi Protected Area, Kataysky District

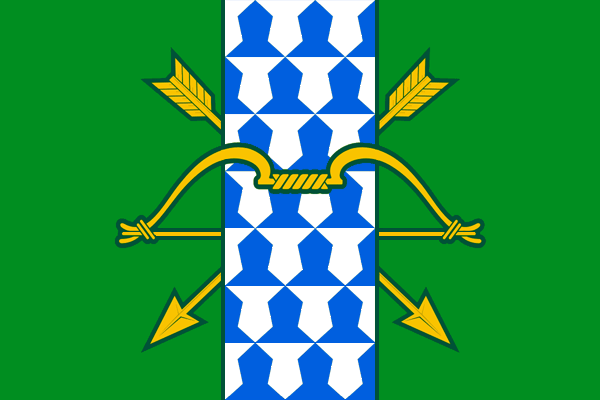
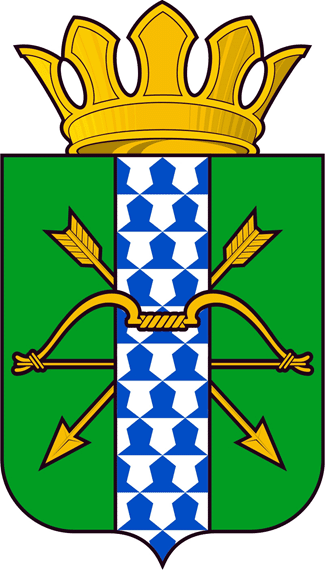
- Flag Coat of arms
- Location of Kataysky District in Kurgan Oblast
- Coordinates: 56°18′00″N 62°34′00″E
- Country: Russia
- Federal subject: Kurgan Oblast
- Established: 1 January 1924
- Administrative center: Kataysk

Area
  - Total: 2,670 km^{2} (1,030 sq mi)

Population (2010 Census)
  - Total: 23,991
  - Density: 8.99/km^{2} (23.3/sq mi)
  - Urban: 58.4%
  - Rural: 41.6%

Administrative structure
  - Administrative divisions: 1 Towns under district jurisdiction, 15 Selsoviets
  - Inhabited localities: 1 cities/towns, 48 rural localities

Municipal structure
  - Municipally incorporated as: Kataysky Municipal District
  - Municipal divisions: 1 urban settlements, 15 rural settlements
- Time zone: UTC+5 (MSK+2)
- OKTMO ID: 37612000
- Website: http://katayskraion.ru/

Kataysky District (Russian: Катайский райо́н) is an administrative and municipal district (raion), one of the twenty-four in Kurgan Oblast, Russia. It is located in the northwest of the oblast. The area of the district is 2,670 square kilometers (1,030 sq mi). Its administrative center is the town of Kataysk. Population: 23,991 (2010 census); 28,099 (2002 Census); 31,720 (1989 Soviet census). The population of Kataysk accounts for 58.4% of the district's total population.
