= Mokrousovsky District =

Mokrousovsky District Мокроусовский район (Russian)
- District
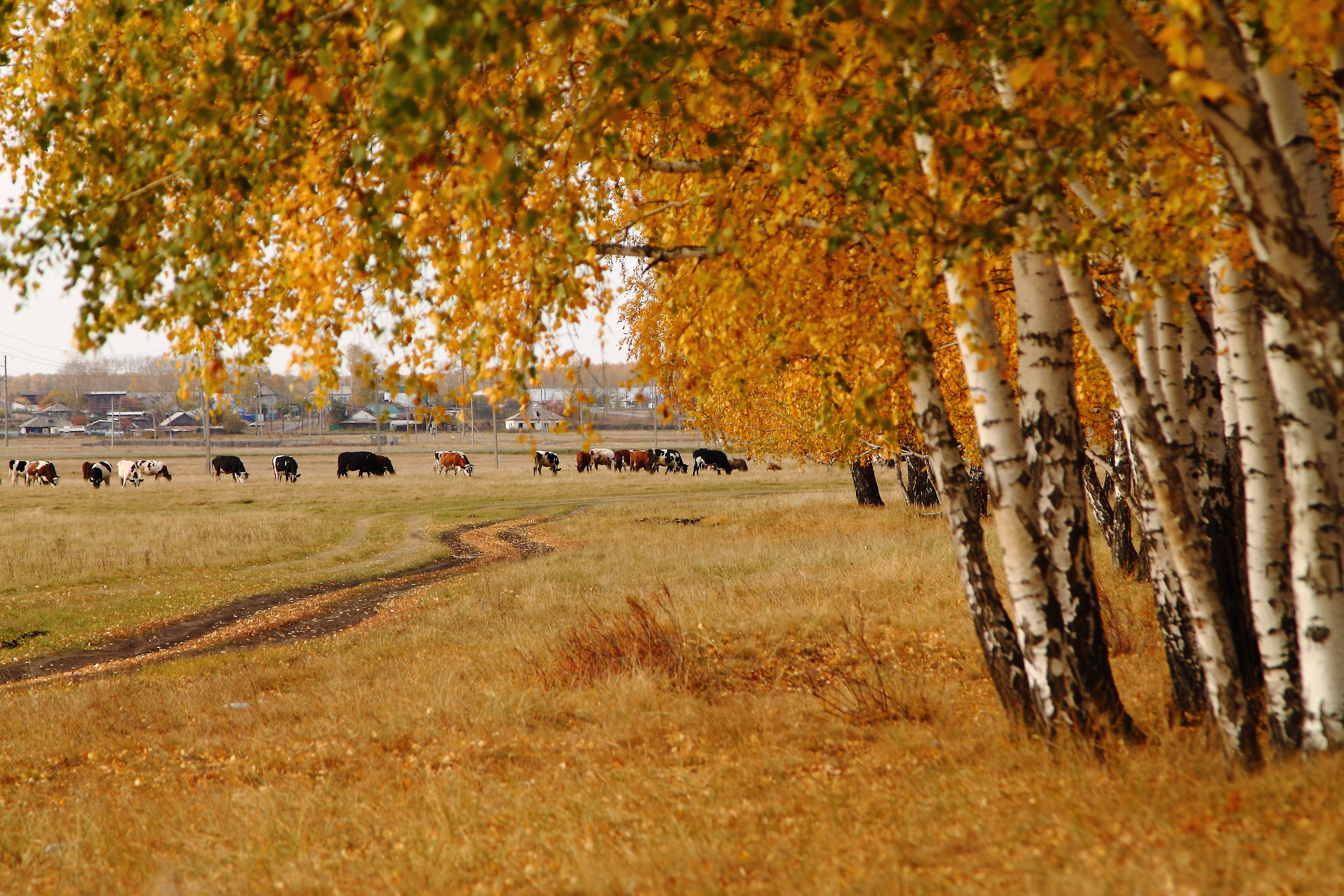
- Mokrousovsky Reserve, Mokrousovsky District

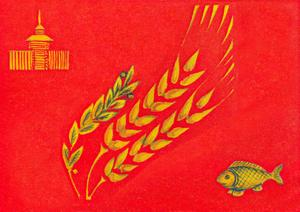
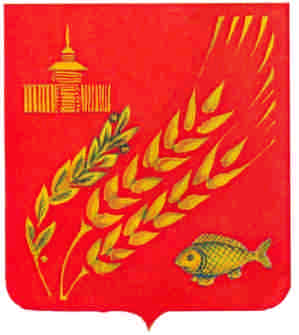
- Flag Coat of arms
- Location of Mokrousovsky District in Kurgan Oblast
- Coordinates: 55°48′45″N 66°46′15″E
- Country: Russia
- Federal subject: Kurgan Oblast
- Established: 1924
- Administrative center: Mokrousovo

Area
  - Total: 3,080 km^{2} (1,190 sq mi)

Population (2010 Census)
  - Total: 13,115
  - Density: 4.26/km^{2} (11.0/sq mi)
  - Urban: 0%
  - Rural: 100%

Administrative structure
  - Administrative divisions: 17 selsoviet
  - Inhabited localities: 47 rural localities

Municipal structure
  - Municipally incorporated as: Mokrousovsky Municipal District
  - Municipal divisions: 0 urban settlements, 17 rural settlements
- Time zone: UTC+5 (MSK+2)
- OKTMO ID: 37624000
- Website: https://www.mokrousovo.ru/

Mokrousovsky District (Russian: Мокроусовский райо́н) is an administrative and municipal district (raion), one of the twenty-four in Kurgan Oblast, Russia. It is located in the northeast of the oblast. The area of the district is 3,080 square kilometers (1,190 sq mi). Its administrative center is the rural locality (a selo) of Mokrousovo. Population: 13,115 (2010 census); 15,379 (2002 Census); 17,157 (1989 Soviet census). The population of Mokrousovo accounts for 37.0% of the district's total population.
