= Vargashinsky District =

District in Kurgan Oblast, Russia

Vargashinsky District Варгашинский район (Russian)
- District
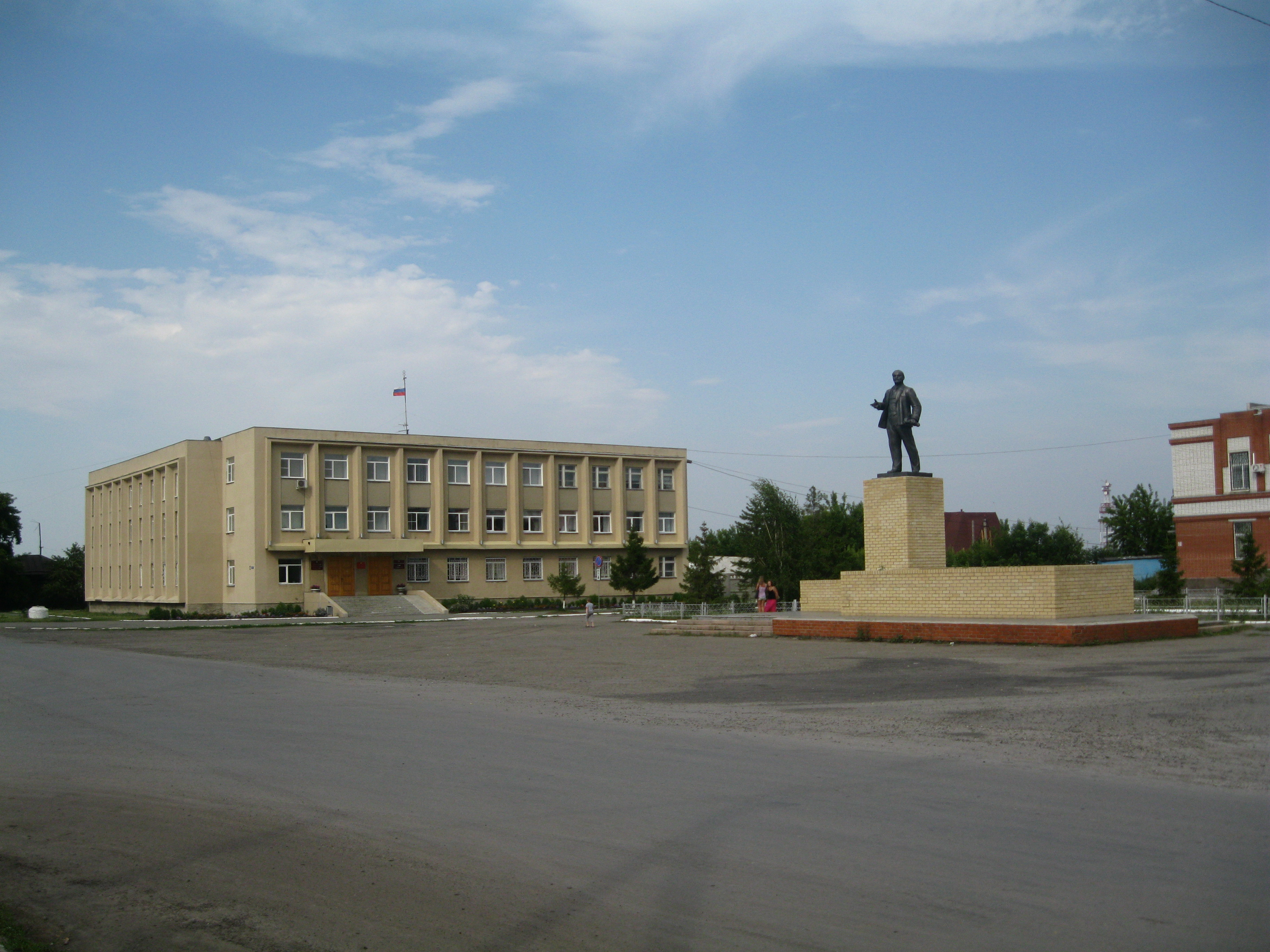
- Vargashinsky District Administration building in Vargashi

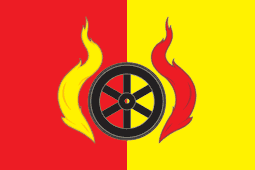
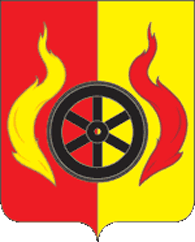
- Flag Coat of arms
- Location of Vargashinsky District in Kurgan Oblast
- Coordinates: 55°24′N 65°48′E
- Country: Russia
- Federal subject: Kurgan Oblast
- Established: 3 November 1923
- Administrative center: Vargashi

Area
  - Total: 3,020 km^{2} (1,170 sq mi)

Population (2010 Census)
  - Total: 19,919
  - Density: 6.60/km^{2} (17.1/sq mi)
  - Urban: 46.5%
  - Rural: 53.5%

Administrative structure
  - Administrative divisions: 1 Urban-type settlements under district jurisdiction, 18 Selsoviets
  - Inhabited localities: 1 urban-type settlements, 52 rural localities

Municipal structure
  - Municipally incorporated as: Vargashinsky Municipal District
  - Municipal divisions: 1 urban settlements, 18 rural settlements
- Time zone: UTC+5 (MSK+2)
- OKTMO ID: 37606000
- Website: http://www.45варгаши.рф/

Vargashinsky District (Russian: Варгаши́нский райо́н) is an administrative and municipal district (raion), one of the twenty-four in Kurgan Oblast, Russia. It is located in the central and northern parts of the oblast. The area of the district is 3,020 square kilometers (1,170 sq mi). Its administrative center is the urban locality (an urban-type settlement) of Vargashi. Population: 19,919 (2010 census); 23,255 (2002 Census); 24,417 (1989 Soviet census). The population of the administrative center accounts for 46.5% of the district's total population.
