= Pokrovka, Russia =

Pokrovka (Russian: Покровка) is the name of several rural localities in Russia.

== Altai Krai ==
As of 2010, nine rural localities in Altai Krai bear this name:

- Pokrovka, Bayevsky District, Altai Krai, a selo in Nizhnechumansky Selsoviet of Bayevsky District
- Pokrovka, Charyshsky District, Altai Krai, a selo in Senteleksky Selsoviet of Charyshsky District
- Pokrovka, Klyuchevsky District, Altai Krai, a selo in Pokrovsky Selsoviet of Klyuchevsky District
- Pokrovka, Loktevsky District, Altai Krai, a selo in Pokrovsky Selsoviet of Loktevsky District
- Pokrovka, Mamontovsky District, Altai Krai, a selo in Pokrovsky Selsoviet of Mamontovsky District
- Pokrovka, Pervomaysky District, Altai Krai, a settlement in Bayunovoklyuchevsky Selsoviet of Pervomaysky District
- Pokrovka, Rodinsky District, Altai Krai, a selo in Pokrovsky Selsoviet of Rodinsky District
- Pokrovka, Slavgorodsky District, Altai Krai, a selo in Pokrovsky Selsoviet of Slavgorodsky District
- Pokrovka, Topchikhinsky District, Altai Krai, a selo in Pokrovsky Selsoviet of Topchikhinsky District

== Amur Oblast ==
As of 2010, one rural locality in Amur Oblast bears this name:

- Pokrovka, Amur Oblast, a selo in Nikoloalexandrovsky Rural Settlement of Oktyabrsky District

== Astrakhan Oblast ==
As of 2010, one rural locality in Astrakhan Oblast bears this name:

- Pokrovka, Astrakhan Oblast, a selo in Pokrovsky Selsoviet of Akhtubinsky District

== Republic of Bashkortostan ==
As of 2010, nineteen rural localities in the Republic of Bashkortostan bear this name:

- Pokrovka, Abzelilovsky District, Republic of Bashkortostan, a village in Krasnobashkirsky Selsoviet of Abzelilovsky District
- Pokrovka, Aurgazinsky District, Republic of Bashkortostan, a village in Ismagilovsky Selsoviet of Aurgazinsky District
- Pokrovka, Bakalinsky District, Republic of Bashkortostan, a village in Starosharashlinsky Selsoviet of Bakalinsky District
- Pokrovka, Baymaksky District, Republic of Bashkortostan, a village in Zilairsky Selsoviet of Baymaksky District
- Pokrovka, Belebeyevsky District, Republic of Bashkortostan, a village in Usen-Ivanovsky Selsoviet of Belebeyevsky District
- Pokrovka, Blagoveshchensky District, Republic of Bashkortostan, a selo in Pokrovsky Selsoviet of Blagoveshchensky District
- Pokrovka, Dyurtyulinsky District, Republic of Bashkortostan, a village in Mayadykovsky Selsoviet of Dyurtyulinsky District
- Pokrovka, Fyodorovsky District, Republic of Bashkortostan, a village in Pokrovsky Selsoviet of Fyodorovsky District
- Pokrovka, Iglinsky District, Republic of Bashkortostan, a village in Tavtimanovsky Selsoviet of Iglinsky District
- Pokrovka, Karmaskalinsky District, Republic of Bashkortostan, a village in Karlamansky Selsoviet of Karmaskalinsky District
- Pokrovka, Kuyurgazinsky District, Republic of Bashkortostan, a selo in Bakhmutsky Selsoviet of Kuyurgazinsky District
- Pokrovka, Meleuzovsky District, Republic of Bashkortostan, a village in Korneyevsky Selsoviet of Meleuzovsky District
- Pokrovka, Salavatsky District, Republic of Bashkortostan, a village in Maloyazovsky Selsoviet of Salavatsky District
- Pokrovka, Sharansky District, Republic of Bashkortostan, a village in Michurinsky Selsoviet of Sharansky District
- Pokrovka, Sterlibashevsky District, Republic of Bashkortostan, a village in Starokalkashevsky Selsoviet of Sterlibashevsky District
- Pokrovka, Kuganaksky Selsoviet, Sterlitamaksky District, Republic of Bashkortostan, a selo in Kuganaksky Selsoviet of Sterlitamaksky District
- Pokrovka, Naumovsky Selsoviet, Sterlitamaksky District, Republic of Bashkortostan, a village in Naumovsky Selsoviet of Sterlitamaksky District
- Pokrovka, Tuymazinsky District, Republic of Bashkortostan, a village in Tyumenyakovsky Selsoviet of Tuymazinsky District
- Pokrovka, Ufimsky District, Republic of Bashkortostan, a village in Cherkassky Selsoviet of Ufimsky District

== Belgorod Oblast ==
As of 2010, three rural localities in Belgorod Oblast bear this name:

- Pokrovka, Borisovsky District, Belgorod Oblast, a selo in Khotmyzhsky Rural Okrug of Borisovsky District
- Pokrovka, Ivnyansky District, Belgorod Oblast, a selo in Ivnyansky District
- Pokrovka, Volokonovsky District, Belgorod Oblast, a selo in Pokrovsky Rural Okrug of Volokonovsky District

== Bryansk Oblast ==
As of 2010, three rural localities in Bryansk Oblast bear this name:

- Pokrovka, Pochepsky District, Bryansk Oblast, a village in Papsuyevsky Selsoviet of Pochepsky District
- Pokrovka, Surazhsky District, Bryansk Oblast, a village in Andreyevsky Selsoviet of Surazhsky District
- Pokrovka, Vygonichsky District, Bryansk Oblast, a settlement in Krasnoselsky Selsoviet of Vygonichsky District

== Republic of Buryatia ==
As of 2010, two rural localities in the Republic of Buryatia bear this name:

- Pokrovka, Bichursky District, Republic of Buryatia, a selo in Gochitsky Selsoviet of Bichursky District
- Pokrovka, Pribaykalsky District, Republic of Buryatia, a selo in Itantsinsky Selsoviet of Pribaykalsky District

== Chelyabinsk Oblast ==
As of 2010, one rural locality in Chelyabinsk Oblast bears this name:

- Pokrovka, Chelyabinsk Oblast, a village under the administrative jurisdiction of the work settlement of Suleya, Satkinsky District

== Irkutsk Oblast ==
As of 2010, three rural localities in Irkutsk Oblast bear this name:

- Pokrovka, Tayshetsky District, Irkutsk Oblast, a village in Tayshetsky District
- Pokrovka, Ziminsky District, Irkutsk Oblast, a selo in Ziminsky District
- Pokrovka, Bayandayevsky District, Irkutsk Oblast, a village in Bayandayevsky District

== Kaluga Oblast ==
As of 2010, one rural locality in Kaluga Oblast bears this name:

- Pokrovka, Kaluga Oblast, a village in Kozelsky District

== Kemerovo Oblast ==
As of 2010, two rural localities in Kemerovo Oblast bear this name:

- Pokrovka, Chebulinsky District, Kemerovo Oblast, a village under the administrative jurisdiction of the urban-type settlement of Verkh-Chebula, Chebulinsky District
- Pokrovka, Leninsk-Kuznetsky District, Kemerovo Oblast, a village in Shabanovskaya Rural Territory of Leninsk-Kuznetsky District

== Khabarovsk Krai ==
As of 2010, one rural locality in Khabarovsk Krai bears this name:

- Pokrovka, Khabarovsk Krai, a selo in Bikinsky District

== Krasnoyarsk Krai ==
As of 2014, nine rural localities in Krasnoyarsk Krai bear this name:

- Pokrovka, Abansky District, Krasnoyarsk Krai, a selo in Pokrovsky Selsoviet of Abansky District
- Pokrovka (selo), Tarutinsky Selsoviet, Achinsky District, Krasnoyarsk Krai, a selo in Tarutinsky Selsoviet of Achinsky District
- Pokrovka (settlement), Tarutinsky Selsoviet, Achinsky District, Krasnoyarsk Krai, a settlement in Tarutinsky Selsoviet of Achinsky District
- Pokrovka, Bolshemurtinsky District, Krasnoyarsk Krai, a village in Predivinsky Selsoviet of Bolshemurtinsky District
- Pokrovka, Nizhneingashsky District, Krasnoyarsk Krai, a village in Sokolovsky Selsoviet of Nizhneingashsky District
- Pokrovka, Tyukhtetsky District, Krasnoyarsk Krai, a village in Tyukhtetsky Selsoviet of Tyukhtetsky District
- Pokrovka, Uyarsky District, Krasnoyarsk Krai, a village in Avdinsky Selsoviet of Uyarsky District
- Pokrovka, Yemelyanovsky District, Krasnoyarsk Krai, a village in Talsky Selsoviet of Yemelyanovsky District
- Pokrovka, Yermakovsky District, Krasnoyarsk Krai, a village in Tanzybeysky Selsoviet of Yermakovsky District

== Kurgan Oblast ==
As of 2010, four rural localities in Kurgan Oblast bear this name:

- Pokrovka, Kureinsky Selsoviet, Makushinsky District, Kurgan Oblast, a village in Kureinsky Selsoviet of Makushinsky District
- Pokrovka, Tryukhinsky Selsoviet, Makushinsky District, Kurgan Oblast, a village in Tryukhinsky Selsoviet of Makushinsky District
- Pokrovka, Pritobolny District, Kurgan Oblast, a village in Davydovsky Selsoviet of Pritobolny District
- Pokrovka, Safakulevsky District, Kurgan Oblast, a village in Kamyshinsky Selsoviet of Safakulevsky District

== Kursk Oblast ==
As of 2010, one rural locality in Kursk Oblast bears this name:

- Pokrovka, Kursk Oblast, a village in Prilepsky Selsoviet of Pristensky District

== Leningrad Oblast ==
As of 2010, two rural localities in Leningrad Oblast bear this name:

- Pokrovka, Gatchinsky District, Leningrad Oblast, a village in Kobrinskoye Settlement Municipal Formation of Gatchinsky District
- Pokrovka, Luzhsky District, Leningrad Oblast, a village in Mshinskoye Settlement Municipal Formation of Luzhsky District

== Lipetsk Oblast ==
As of 2010, six rural localities in Lipetsk Oblast bear this name:

- Pokrovka, Chaplyginsky District, Lipetsk Oblast, a village in Lozovsky Selsoviet of Chaplyginsky District
- Pokrovka, Dankovsky District, Lipetsk Oblast, a village in Plakhovsky Selsoviet of Dankovsky District
- Pokrovka, Petrovsky Selsoviet, Dobrinsky District, Lipetsk Oblast, a village in Petrovsky Selsoviet of Dobrinsky District
- Pokrovka, Tikhvinsky Selsoviet, Dobrinsky District, Lipetsk Oblast, a village in Tikhvinsky Selsoviet of Dobrinsky District
- Pokrovka, Krasninsky District, Lipetsk Oblast, a selo in Drezgalovsky Selsoviet of Krasninsky District
- Pokrovka, Lebedyansky District, Lipetsk Oblast, a village in Vyazovsky Selsoviet of Lebedyansky District

== Mari El Republic ==
As of 2010, one rural locality in the Mari El Republic bears this name:

- Pokrovka, Mari El Republic, a village in Ruemsky Rural Okrug of Medvedevsky District

== Moscow Oblast ==
As of 2010, three rural localities in Moscow Oblast bear this name:

- Pokrovka, Klinsky District, Moscow Oblast, a village under the administrative jurisdiction of the town of Klin in Klinsky District
- Pokrovka, Ateptsevskoye Rural Settlement, Naro-Fominsky District, Moscow Oblast, a village in Ateptsevskoye Rural Settlement of Naro-Fominsky District
- Pokrovka, Tashirovskoye Rural Settlement, Naro-Fominsky District, Moscow Oblast, a khutor in Tashirovskoye Rural Settlement of Naro-Fominsky District

== Nizhny Novgorod Oblast ==
As of 2010, eight rural localities in Nizhny Novgorod Oblast bear this name:

- Pokrovka, Arzamassky District, Nizhny Novgorod Oblast, a village in Lomovsky Selsoviet of Arzamassky District
- Pokrovka, Koverninsky District, Nizhny Novgorod Oblast, a village in Gorevsky Selsoviet of Koverninsky District
- Pokrovka, Lukoyanovsky District, Nizhny Novgorod Oblast, a selo under the administrative jurisdiction of the work settlement of imeni Stepana Razina, Lukoyanovsky District
- Pokrovka, Lyskovsky District, Nizhny Novgorod Oblast, a village in Kislovsky Selsoviet of Lyskovsky District
- Pokrovka, Shatkovsky District, Nizhny Novgorod Oblast, a settlement under the administrative jurisdiction of the work settlement of Shatki in Shatkovsky District
- Pokrovka, Vorotynsky District, Nizhny Novgorod Oblast, a village in Ognev-Maydansky Selsoviet of Vorotynsky District
- Pokrovka, Voznesensky District, Nizhny Novgorod Oblast, a village in Blagodatovsky Selsoviet of Voznesensky District
- Pokrovka, Vyksunsky District, Nizhny Novgorod Oblast, a village in Novodmitriyevsky Selsoviet of Vyksunsky District

== Novgorod Oblast ==
As of 2010, two rural localities in Novgorod Oblast bear this name:

- Pokrovka, Batetsky District, Novgorod Oblast, a village in Peredolskoye Settlement of Batetsky District
- Pokrovka, Demyansky District, Novgorod Oblast, a village in Pesotskoye Settlement of Demyansky District

== Novosibirsk Oblast ==
As of 2010, seven rural localities in Novosibirsk Oblast bear this name:

- Pokrovka, Chanovsky District, Novosibirsk Oblast, a selo in Chanovsky District
- Pokrovka, Chistoozyorny District, Novosibirsk Oblast, a selo in Chistoozyorny District
- Pokrovka, Dovolensky District, Novosibirsk Oblast, a selo in Dovolensky District
- Pokrovka, Karasuksky District, Novosibirsk Oblast, a settlement in Karasuksky District
- Pokrovka, Kochkovsky District, Novosibirsk Oblast, a settlement in Kochkovsky District
- Pokrovka, Kupinsky District, Novosibirsk Oblast, a village in Kupinsky District
- Pokrovka, Ust-Tarksky District, Novosibirsk Oblast, a village in Ust-Tarksky District

== Omsk Oblast ==
As of 2010, four rural localities in Omsk Oblast bear this name:

- Pokrovka, Lyubinsky District, Omsk Oblast, a village in Zameletenovsky Rural Okrug of Lyubinsky District
- Pokrovka, Nazyvayevsky District, Omsk Oblast, a selo in Pokrovsky Rural Okrug of Nazyvayevsky District
- Pokrovka, Nizhneomsky District, Omsk Oblast, a village in Sitnikovsky Rural Okrug of Nizhneomsky District
- Pokrovka, Omsky District, Omsk Oblast, a selo in Pokrovsky Rural Okrug of Omsky District

== Orenburg Oblast ==
As of 2010, eleven rural localities in Orenburg Oblast bear this name:

- Pokrovka, Abdulinsky District, Orenburg Oblast, a selo in Pokrovsky Selsoviet of Abdulinsky District
- Pokrovka, Akbulaksky District, Orenburg Oblast, a selo in Michurinsky Selsoviet of Akbulaksky District
- Pokrovka, Buzuluksky District, Orenburg Oblast, a selo in Lisyepolyansky Selsoviet of Buzuluksky District
- Pokrovka, Grachyovsky District, Orenburg Oblast, a selo in Novonikolsky Selsoviet of Grachyovsky District
- Pokrovka, Krasnogvardeysky District, Orenburg Oblast, a selo in Preobrazhensky Selsoviet of Krasnogvardeysky District
- Pokrovka, Kurmanayevsky District, Orenburg Oblast, a selo in Pokrovsky Selsoviet of Kurmanayevsky District
- Pokrovka, Kvarkensky District, Orenburg Oblast, a selo in Uralsky Selsoviet of Kvarkensky District
- Pokrovka, Novosergiyevsky District, Orenburg Oblast, a selo in Pokrovsky Selsoviet of Novosergiyevsky District
- Pokrovka, Sharlyksky District, Orenburg Oblast, a selo in Slonovsky Selsoviet of Sharlyksky District
- Pokrovka, Sol-Iletsky District, Orenburg Oblast, a selo in Pokrovsky Selsoviet of Sol-Iletsky District
- Pokrovka, Sorochinsky District, Orenburg Oblast, a selo in Voykovsky Selsoviet of Sorochinsky District

== Oryol Oblast ==
As of 2010, two rural localities in Oryol Oblast bear this name:

- Pokrovka, Kolpnyansky District, Oryol Oblast, a village in Karlovsky Selsoviet of Kolpnyansky District
- Pokrovka, Novosilsky District, Oryol Oblast, a settlement in Golunsky Selsoviet of Novosilsky District

== Penza Oblast ==
As of 2010, four rural localities in Penza Oblast bear this name:

- Pokrovka, Bekovsky District, Penza Oblast, a selo in Pyashinsky Selsoviet of Bekovsky District
- Pokrovka, Kameshkirsky District, Penza Oblast, a selo in Pestrovsky Selsoviet of Kameshkirsky District
- Pokrovka, Nikolsky District, Penza Oblast, a village in Maissky Selsoviet of Nikolsky District
- Pokrovka, Pachelmsky District, Penza Oblast, a selo in Sheynsky Selsoviet of Pachelmsky District

== Perm Krai ==
As of 2010, three rural localities in Perm Krai bear this name:

- Pokrovka, Beryozovsky District, Perm Krai, a selo in Beryozovsky District
- Pokrovka, Chernushinsky District, Perm Krai, a village in Chernushinsky District
- Pokrovka, Osinsky District, Perm Krai, a village in Osinsky District

== Primorsky Krai ==
As of 2010, three rural localities in Primorsky Krai bear this name:

- Pokrovka, Krasnoarmeysky District, Primorsky Krai, a selo in Krasnoarmeysky District
- Pokrovka, Oktyabrsky District, Primorsky Krai, a selo in Oktyabrsky District
- Pokrovka, Yakovlevsky District, Primorsky Krai, a selo in Yakovlevsky District

== Ryazan Oblast ==
As of 2010, one rural locality in Ryazan Oblast bears this name:

- Pokrovka, Ryazan Oblast, a village in Aleshinsky Rural Okrug of Rybnovsky District

== Sakha Republic ==
As of 2010, one rural locality in the Sakha Republic bears this name:

- Pokrovka, Sakha Republic, a selo in Maysky Rural Okrug of Amginsky District

== Sakhalin Oblast ==
As of 2010, one rural locality in Sakhalin Oblast bears this name:

- Pokrovka, Sakhalin Oblast, a selo in Dolinsky District

== Samara Oblast ==
As of 2010, six rural localities in Samara Oblast bear this name:

- Pokrovka, Bezenchuksky District, Samara Oblast, a selo in Bezenchuksky District
- Pokrovka, Borsky District, Samara Oblast, a selo in Borsky District
- Pokrovka (Ozerki Rural Settlement), Chelno-Vershinsky District, Samara Oblast, a settlement in Chelno-Vershinsky District; municipally, a part of Ozerki Rural Settlement of that district
- Pokrovka (Devlezerkino Rural Settlement), Chelno-Vershinsky District, Samara Oblast, a settlement in Chelno-Vershinsky District; municipally, a part of Devlezerkino Rural Settlement of that district
- Pokrovka, Kinelsky District, Samara Oblast, a selo in Kinelsky District
- Pokrovka, Neftegorsky District, Samara Oblast, a selo in Neftegorsky District

== Saratov Oblast ==
As of 2010, one rural locality in Saratov Oblast bears this name:

- Pokrovka, Saratov Oblast, a selo in Volsky District

== Smolensk Oblast ==
As of 2010, one rural locality in Smolensk Oblast bears this name:

- Pokrovka, Smolensk Oblast, a village in Muryginskoye Rural Settlement of Pochinkovsky District

== Tambov Oblast ==
As of 2010, four rural localities in Tambov Oblast bear this name:

- Pokrovka, Inzhavinsky District, Tambov Oblast, a village in Mikhaylovsky Selsoviet of Inzhavinsky District
- Pokrovka, Muchkapsky District, Tambov Oblast, a selo in Troitsky Selsoviet of Muchkapsky District
- Pokrovka, Sosnovsky District, Tambov Oblast, a settlement in Olkhovsky Selsoviet of Sosnovsky District
- Pokrovka, Uvarovsky District, Tambov Oblast, a settlement in Nizhneshibryaysky Selsoviet of Uvarovsky District

== Republic of Tatarstan ==
As of 2010, three rural localities in the Republic of Tatarstan bear this name:

- Pokrovka, Muslyumovsky District, Republic of Tatarstan, a selo in Muslyumovsky District
- Pokrovka, Spassky District, Republic of Tatarstan, a selo in Spassky District
- Pokrovka, Verkhneuslonsky District, Republic of Tatarstan, a village in Verkhneuslonsky District

== Tver Oblast ==
As of 2010, two rural localities in Tver Oblast bear this name:

- Pokrovka, Likhoslavlsky District, Tver Oblast, a village in Likhoslavlsky District
- Pokrovka, Selizharovsky District, Tver Oblast, a village in Selizharovsky District

== Tyumen Oblast ==
As of 2010, four rural localities in Tyumen Oblast bear this name:

- Pokrovka, Sladkovsky District, Tyumen Oblast, a village in Usovsky Rural Okrug of Sladkovsky District
- Pokrovka, Sorokinsky District, Tyumen Oblast, a selo in Pokrovsky Rural Okrug of Sorokinsky District
- Pokrovka, Vikulovsky District, Tyumen Oblast, a selo in Sartamsky Rural Okrug of Vikulovsky District
- Pokrovka, Zavodoukovsky District, Tyumen Oblast, a village in Zavodoukovsky District

== Vladimir Oblast ==
As of 2010, one rural locality in Vladimir Oblast bears this name:

- Pokrovka, Vladimir Oblast, a village in Kolchuginsky District

== Volgograd Oblast ==
As of 2010, one rural locality in Volgograd Oblast bears this name:

- Pokrovka, Volgograd Oblast, a selo in Pokrovsky Selsoviet of Leninsky District

== Voronezh Oblast ==
As of 2010, four rural localities in Voronezh Oblast bear this name:

- Pokrovka, Ostrogozhsky District, Voronezh Oblast, a selo in Korotoyakskoye Rural Settlement of Ostrogozhsky District
- Pokrovka, Pavlovsky District, Voronezh Oblast, a selo in Pokrovskoye Rural Settlement of Pavlovsky District
- Pokrovka, Podgorensky District, Voronezh Oblast, a khutor in Pervomayskoye Rural Settlement of Podgorensky District
- Pokrovka, Verkhnekhavsky District, Voronezh Oblast, a village in Plyasovatskoye Rural Settlement of Verkhnekhavsky District

== Zabaykalsky Krai ==
As of 2010, one rural locality in Zabaykalsky Krai bears this name:

- Pokrovka, Zabaykalsky Krai, a selo in Mogochinsky District
