= Gluboky, Russia =

Gluboky (Russian: Глубокий; masculine), Glubokaya (Глубокая; feminine), or Glubokoye (Глубокое; neuter) is the name of several inhabited localities in Russia.

Urban localities

- Gluboky, Kamensky District, Rostov Oblast, a work settlement in Kamensky District of Rostov Oblast

Rural localities

- Gluboky, Amur Oblast, a railway station under the administrative jurisdiction of Urusha Urban Settlement in Skovorodinsky District of Amur Oblast
- Gluboky (settlement), Arkhangelsk Oblast, a settlement in Bestuzhevsky Selsoviet of Ustyansky District of Arkhangelsk Oblast
- Gluboky (village), Arkhangelsk Oblast, a village in Bestuzhevsky Selsoviet of Ustyansky District of Arkhangelsk Oblast
- Gluboky, Krasnodar Krai, a settlement in Novoselsky Rural Okrug of Novokubansky District of Krasnodar Krai
- Gluboky, Zimovnikovsky District, Rostov Oblast, a khutor in Glubochanskoye Rural Settlement of Zimovnikovsky District of Rostov Oblast
- Gluboky, Samara Oblast, a settlement in Sergiyevsky District of Samara Oblast
- Gluboky, Saratov Oblast, a khutor in Alexandrovo-Gaysky District of Saratov Oblast
- Gluboky, Stavropol Krai, a khutor in Pravokumsky Selsoviet of Sovetsky District of Stavropol Krai
- Glubokoye, Altai Krai, a selo in Glubokovsky Selsoviet of Zavyalovsky District of Altai Krai
- Glubokoye, Kemerovo Oblast, a selo in Zarubinskaya Rural Territory of Topkinsky District of Kemerovo Oblast
- Glubokoye, Kurgan Oblast, a selo in Glubokinsky Selsoviet of Shadrinsky District of Kurgan Oblast
- Glubokoye, Luzhsky District, Leningrad Oblast, a village in Osminskoye Settlement Municipal Formation of Luzhsky District of Leningrad Oblast
- Glubokoye, Krasnoselskoye Settlement Municipal Formation, Vyborgsky District, Leningrad Oblast, a logging depot settlement in Krasnoselskoye Settlement Municipal Formation of Vyborgsky District of Leningrad Oblast
- Glubokoye, Kamennogorskoye Settlement Municipal Formation, Vyborgsky District, Leningrad Oblast, a logging depot settlement in Kamennogorskoye Settlement Municipal Formation in Vyborgsky District of Leningrad Oblast
- Glubokoye, Moscow Oblast, a selo in Uzunovskoye Rural Settlement of Serebryano-Prudsky District of Moscow Oblast
- Glubokoye, Novgorod Oblast, a village in Gorskoye Settlement of Soletsky District of Novgorod Oblast
- Glubokoye, Opochetsky District, Pskov Oblast, a village in Opochetsky District, Pskov Oblast
- Glubokoye, Sebezhsky District, Pskov Oblast, a village in Sebezhsky District, Pskov Oblast
- Glubokoye, Smolensk Oblast, a village in Glubokinskoye Rural Settlement of Krasninsky District of Smolensk Oblast
- Glubokoye, Sverdlovsk Oblast, a settlement under the administrative jurisdiction of the City of Yekaterinburg in Sverdlovsk Oblast
- Glubokoye, Bologovsky District, Tver Oblast, a village in Kaftinskoye Rural Settlement of Bologovsky District of Tver Oblast
- Glubokoye, Vyshnevolotsky District, Tver Oblast, a village in Dyatlovskoye Rural Settlement of Vyshnevolotsky District of Tver Oblast
- Glubokoye, Zapadnodvinsky District, Tver Oblast, a village in Zapadnodvinskoye Rural Settlement of Zapadnodvinsky District of Tver Oblast
- Glubokoye, Tyumen Oblast, a village in Berdyuzhsky Rural Okrug of Berdyuzhsky District of Tyumen Oblast
- Glubokoye, Lezhsky Selsoviet, Gryazovetsky District, Vologda Oblast, a village in Lezhsky Selsoviet of Gryazovetsky District of Vologda Oblast
- Glubokoye, Vokhtogsky Selsoviet, Gryazovetsky District, Vologda Oblast, a khutor in Vokhtogsky Selsoviet of Gryazovetsky District of Vologda Oblast
- Glubokoye, Totemsky District, Vologda Oblast, a settlement in Pyatovsky Selsoviet of Totemsky District of Vologda Oblast
- Glubokoye, Voronezh Oblast, a selo in Novolimanskoye Rural Settlement of Petropavlovsky District of Voronezh Oblast
- Glubokaya, Irkutsk Oblast, a settlement in Shelekhovsky District of Irkutsk Oblast
- Glubokaya, Kurgan Oblast, a village in Talovsky Selsoviet of Yurgamyshsky District of Kurgan Oblast
- Glubokaya, Sverdlovsk Oblast, a settlement under the administrative jurisdiction of the Town of Nizhnyaya Tura in Sverdlovsk Oblast
- Glubokaya, Tyumen Oblast, a village in Lamensky Rural Okrug of Golyshmanovsky District of Tyumen Oblast
