= Kamyshenka =

Kamyshenka (Russian: Камышенка) is the name of several rural localities in Russia:

- Kamyshenka, Zavyalovsky District, Altai Krai, a selo in Zavyalovsky District
- Kamyshenka, Amur Oblast, a selo in Zavyalovsky District
