= Paklino =

Paklino Паклино
- Selo
- Location within Altai Krai Location within Russia
- Coordinates: 53°08′N 81°06′E
- Country: Russia
- Region: Altai Krai
- District: Bayevsky District
- Time zone: UTC+7:00

Paklino (Russian: Паклино) is a rural locality (a selo) and the administrative center of Paklinsky Selsoviet, Bayevsky District, Altai Krai, Russia. The population was 306 as of 2013. There are 8 streets.

== Geography ==
Paklino is located near Mostovoye lake, 45 kilometers (28 mi) southeast of Bayevo (the district's administrative centre) by road. Safronovo is the nearest rural locality.
