= Ogarev, Voronezh Oblast =

Ogarev Огарев
- Khutor
- Location within Voronezh Oblast Location within Russia
- Coordinates: 50°06′N 41°18′E
- Country: Russia
- Region: Voronezh Oblast
- District: Petropavlovsky District
- Time zone: UTC+3:00

Ogarev (Russian: Огарев) is a rural locality (a khutor) in Krasnoflotskoye Rural Settlement, Petropavlovsky District, Voronezh Oblast, Russia. The population was 1,069 as of 2010. There are 4 streets.

== Geography ==
Ogarev is located 42 km east of Petropavlovka (the district's administrative centre) by road. Krasnoflotskoye is the nearest rural locality.
