= Dedovochka =

Dedovochka Дедовочка
- Selo
- Location within Voronezh Oblast Location within Russia
- Coordinates: 49°54′N 40°56′E
- Country: Russia
- Region: Voronezh Oblast
- District: Petropavlovsky District
- Time zone: UTC+3:00

Dedovochka (Russian: Дедовочка) is a rural locality (a selo) in Novolimanskoye Rural Settlement, Petropavlovsky District, Voronezh Oblast, Russia. The population was 78 as of 2010.

== Geography ==
Dedovochka is 25 kilometres (16 mi) south of Petropavlovka (the district's administrative centre) by road. Dedovka is the nearest rural locality.
