= Zamostye =

Zamostye Замостье
- Khutor
- Location within Voronezh Oblast Location within Russia
- Coordinates: 50°01′N 40°49′E
- Country: Russia
- Region: Voronezh Oblast
- District: Petropavlovsky District
- Time zone: UTC+3:00

Zamostye (Russian: Замостье) is a rural locality (a khutor) in Bychkovskoye Rural Settlement, Petropavlovsky District, Voronezh Oblast, Russia. The population was 459 as of 2010. There are 11 streets.

== Geography ==
Zamostye is located 9 km southwest of Petropavlovka (the district's administrative centre) by road. Bychok is the nearest rural locality.
