= Kapustinka =

Kapustinka Капустинка
- Settlement
- Location within Altai Krai Location within Russia
- Coordinates: 53°19′N 80°59′E
- Country: Russia
- Region: Altai Krai
- District: Bayevsky District
- Time zone: UTC+7:00

Kapustinka (Russian: Капустинка) is a rural locality (a settlement) in Proslaukhinsky Selsoviet, Bayevsky District, Altai Krai, Russia. The population was 40 as of 2013. There are 3 streets.

== Geography ==
Kapustinka is located near the Kulunda River 19 km northeast of Bayevo (the district's administrative centre) by road. Proslaukha is the nearest rural locality.
