= Chernavka, Zavyalovsky District, Altai Krai =

Chernavka Чернавка
- Selo
- Location within Altai Krai Location within Russia
- Coordinates: 52°39′N 80°36′E
- Country: Russia
- Region: Altai Krai
- District: Zavyalovsky District
- Time zone: UTC+7:00

Chernavka (Russian: Чернавка) is a rural locality (a selo) and the administrative center of Chernavsky Selsoviet, Zavyalovsky District, Altai Krai, Russia. The population was 385 as of 2013. There are 10 streets.

== Geography ==
Chernavka is located on the Kulunda plain, 33 km southwest of Zavyalovo (the district's administrative centre) by road. Kamyshenka is the nearest rural locality.
