= Rybnye Borki =

Rybnye Borki Рыбные Борки
- Settlement
- Location within Altai Krai Location within Russia
- Coordinates: 53°11′N 80°36′E
- Country: Russia
- Region: Altai Krai
- District: Bayevsky District
- Time zone: UTC+7:00

Rybnye Borki (Russian: Рыбные Борки) is a rural locality (a settlement) in Bayevsky District, Altai Krai, Russia. The population was 57 as of 2013. There are 3 streets.

== Geography ==
Rybnye Borki is located 18 km southwest of Bayevo (the district's administrative centre) by road. Nizhnechumanka is the nearest rural locality.
