= Verkh-Chumanka =

Verkh-Chumanka Верх-Чуманка
- Village
- Location within Altai Krai Location within Russia
- Coordinates: 53°23′N 80°36′E
- Country: Russia
- Region: Altai Krai
- District: Bayevsky District
- Time zone: UTC+7:00

Verkh-Chumanka (Russian: Верх-Чуманка) is a rural locality (a selo) and the administrative center of Verkh-Chumansky Selsoviet of Bayevsky District, Altai Krai, Russia. The population was 847 as of 2016. There are 18 streets.

== Geography ==
Verkh-Chumanka is located on the bank of the Chuman River, 35 km (22 mi) northwest of Bayevo (the district's administrative centre) by road. Plotava is the nearest rural locality.

== Ethnicity ==
The village is inhabited by Russians and others.
