= Progoreloye =

Progoreloye Прогорелое
- Selo
- Location within Voronezh Oblast Location within Russia
- Coordinates: 49°56′N 40°53′E
- Country: Russia
- Region: Voronezh Oblast
- District: Petropavlovsky District
- Time zone: UTC+3:00

Progoreloye (Russian: Прогорелое) is a rural locality (a selo) in Novolimanskoye Rural Settlement, Petropavlovsky District, Voronezh Oblast, Russia. The population was 135 as of 2010. There are 3 streets.

== Geography ==
Progoreloye is located 22 km south of Petropavlovka (the district's administrative centre) by road. Novy Liman is the nearest rural locality.
