= Bereznyagi =

Bereznyagi Березняги
- Selo
- Location within Voronezh Oblast Location within Russia
- Coordinates: 49°59′N 41°05′E
- Country: Russia
- Region: Voronezh Oblast
- District: Petropavlovsky District
- Time zone: UTC+3:00

Bereznyagi (Russian: Березняги) is a rural locality (a selo) and the administrative center of Bereznyagovskoye Rural Settlement, Petropavlovsky District, Voronezh Oblast, Russia. The population was 773 as of 2010. There are 5 streets.

== Geography ==
Bereznyagi is located 21 km southeast of Petropavlovka (the district's administrative centre) by road. Novobogoroditskoye is the nearest rural locality.
