= Sitnikovo =

Sitnikovo Ситниково
- Village
- Location within Altai Krai Location within Russia
- Coordinates: 53°08′N 80°56′E
- Country: Russia
- Region: Altai Krai
- District: Bayevsky District
- Time zone: UTC+7:00

Sitnikovo (Russian: Ситниково) is a rural locality (a selo) and the administrative center of Sitnikovsky Selsoviet of Bayevsky District, Altai Krai, Russia. The population was 676 as of 2016. There are 7 streets.

== Geography ==
Sitnikovo is located near Mostovoye lake, 31 kilometers (19 mi) south of Bayevo (the district's administrative centre) by road. Soboli is the nearest rural locality.

== Ethnicity ==
The village is inhabited by Russians and others.
