= Bayevo =

Bayevo (Russian: Баево) is the name of several rural localities in Russia:

- Bayevo, Altai Krai, a selo in Bayevsky Selsoviet of Bayevsky District of Altai Krai
- Bayevo, Ardatovsky District, Republic of Mordovia, a selo in Bayevsky Selsoviet of Ardatovsky District of the Republic of Mordovia
- Bayevo, Ichalkovsky District, Republic of Mordovia, a selo in Rozhdestvenno-Bayevsky Selsoviet of Ichalkovsky District of the Republic of Mordovia
- Bayevo, Tengushevsky District, Republic of Mordovia, a village in Narovatovsky Selsoviet of Tengushevsky District of the Republic of Mordovia
- Bayevo, Nizhny Novgorod Oblast, a village in Volzhsky Selsoviet of Sokolsky District of Nizhny Novgorod Oblast
- Bayevo, Pskov Oblast, a village in Pskovsky District of Pskov Oblast
- Bayevo, Sharapovskoye Rural Settlement, Zapadnodvinsky District, Tver Oblast, a village in Sharapovskoye Rural Settlement of Zapadnodvinsky District of Tver Oblast
- Bayevo, Zapadnodvinskoye Rural Settlement, Zapadnodvinsky District, Tver Oblast, a village in Zapadnodvinskoye Rural Settlement of Zapadnodvinsky District of Tver Oblast
