= Chistoozyorka =

Chistoozyorka Чистоозёрка
- Selo
- Location within Altai Krai Location within Russia
- Coordinates: 52°46′N 80°46′E
- Country: Russia
- Region: Altai Krai
- District: Zavyalovsky District
- Time zone: UTC+7:00

Chistoozyorka (Russian: Чистоозёрка) is a rural locality (a selo) and the administrative center of Chistoozyorsky Selsoviet, Zavyalovsky District, Altai Krai, Russia. The population was 1,298 as of 2013. There are 13 streets.

== Geography ==
Chistoozyorka is located on the Kulunda plain, 13 km southwest of Zavyalovo (the district's administrative centre) by road. Zavyalovo is the nearest rural locality.
