= Dobraya Volya =

Dobraya Volya Добрая Воля
- Settlement
- Location within Altai Krai Location within Russia
- Coordinates: 52°54′N 81°14′E
- Country: Russia
- Region: Altai Krai
- District: Zavyalovsky District
- Time zone: UTC+7:00

Dobraya Volya (Russian: Добрая Воля) is a rural locality (a settlement) in Gonokhovsky Selsoviet, Zavyalovsky District, Altai Krai, Russia. The population was 91 as of 2013. There are 2 streets.

== Geography ==
Dobraya Volya is located 33 km northeast of Zavyalovo (the district's administrative centre) by road. Gonokhovo is the nearest rural locality.
