= Gluboky =

Gluboky (masculine), Glubokaya (feminine), or Glubokoye (neuter) may refer to:

- Gluboky, Russia (Glubokaya, Glubokoye), name of several inhabited localities in Russia
- Hlybokaye (Glubokoye), a town in Vitebsk Oblast, Belarus
- Glubokoye, a selo and administrative center of Glubokoye District, East Kazakhstan Oblast, Kazakhstan
- Lake Glubokoye (disambiguation), several lakes
