= Mostovoye (lake) =

Lake in Altai Krai, Russia

- Мостовое
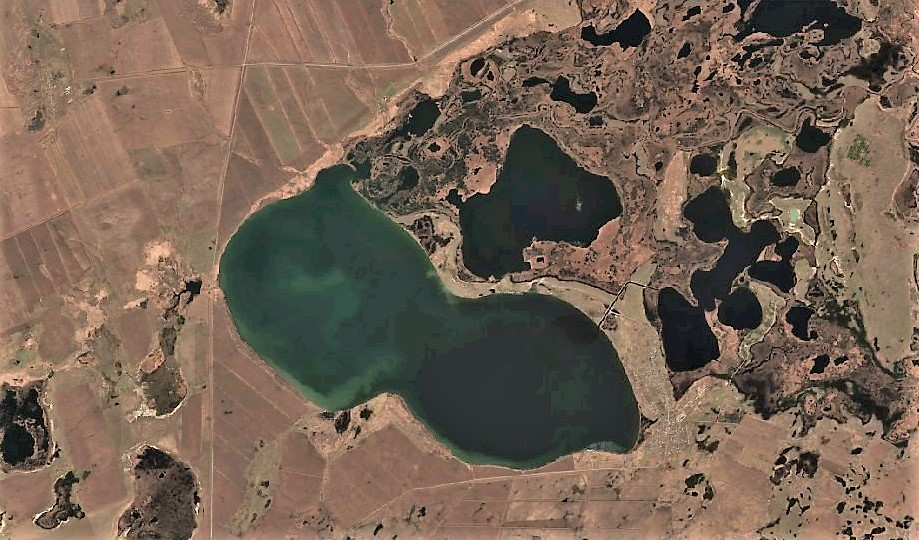
- Mostovoye lake Sentinel-2 image

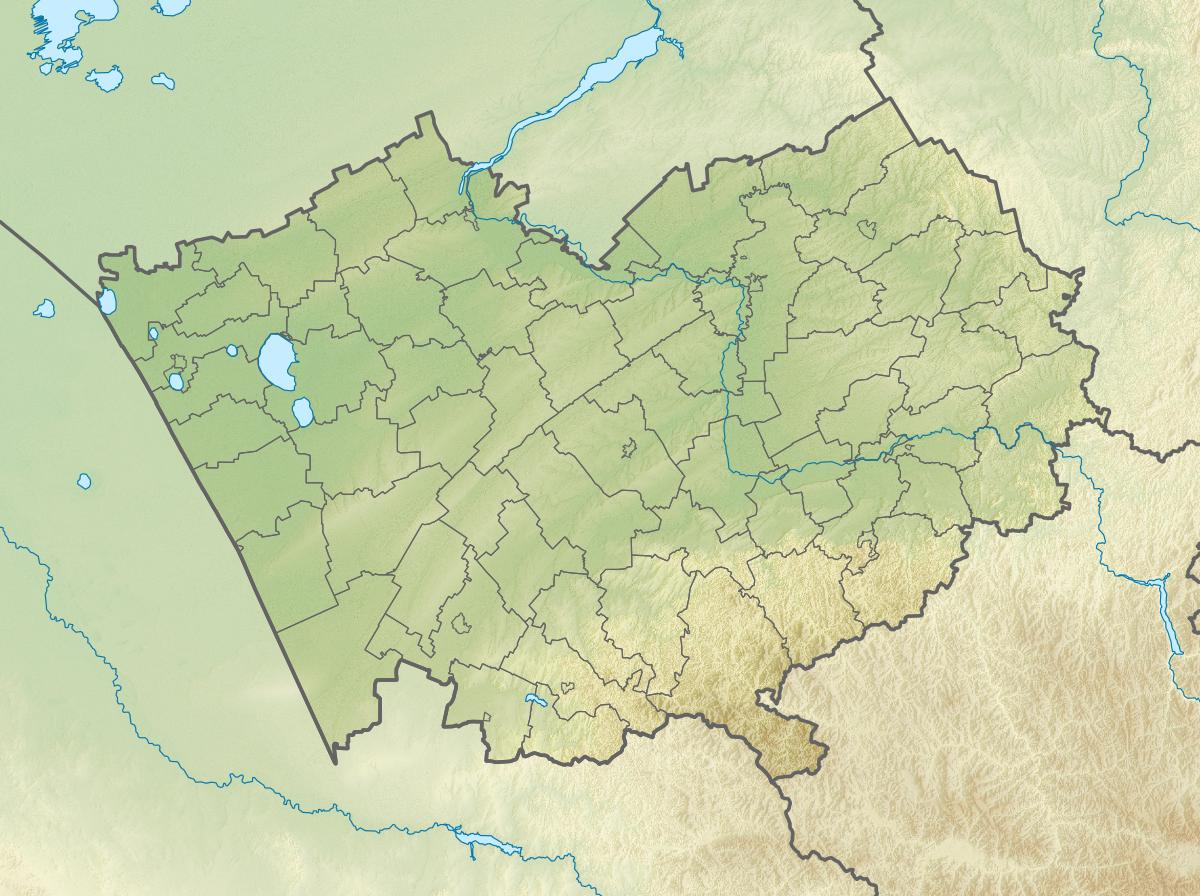
- Location within Altai Krai Location within Russia
- Location: Ob Plateau; West Siberian Plain
- Coordinates: 53°02′44″N 80°51′18″E
- Type: exorheic
- Basin countries: Russia
- Max. length: 10.6 kilometers (6.6 mi)
- Max. width: 4.4 kilometers (2.7 mi)
- Surface area: 37.3 square kilometers (14.4 sq mi)
- Average depth: 2.5 meters (8 ft 2 in)
- Max. depth: 4 meters (13 ft)
- Residence time: UTC+6
- Shore length^{1}: 29 kilometers (18 mi)
- Surface elevation: 140.6 meters (461 ft)
- Islands: None
- ^{1} Shore length is not a well-defined measure.

Mostovoye (Russian: Мостовое) is a lake in Bayevsky and Zavyalovsky districts, Altai Krai, Russian Federation.

Kharitonovo town lies by the southern of the lake. Zavyalovo, the district capital, is located 20 kilometers (12 mi) to the south. Mostovoye is a popular fishing destination. Ice fishing competitions are held yearly in the lake.

== Geography ==
Mostovoye lies in the transition zone between the Ob Plateau and the Kulunda Plain. It is part of the Kulunda river basin. The lake stretches roughly from WNW to ESE for approximately 11 kilometers (6.8 mi). The water is fresh, but formerly it had been salty. In the 1980s a canal was built connecting Mostovoye with the Grachevo and Chernakovo lakes, which brought about a decrease in the salinity.

There is a cluster of smaller lakes and swamps stretching northeastwards from the eastern side up to Sitnikovo and Paklino, the largest of which is Chernakovo. Lake Gorkoye (Tyumentsevsky District) is located 54 kilometers (34 mi) to the northeast. Lake Kulunda lies 70 kilometers (43 mi) to the west and Gorkoye (Romanovsky District) 54 kilometers (34 mi) to the southeast.

== Flora and fauna ==
There are forested areas close to the lake and reeds grow in some sections of the lakeshore. The main fish species in Mostovoye include pike, crucian carp, grass carp, Eurasian carp, bream, perch, tench, common roach and sander. Crayfish are also abundant in the lake.

== See also ==
- List of lakes of Russia
