= Ovechkino (station) =

Ovechkino Овечкино
- Station
- Location within Altai Krai Location within Russia
- Coordinates: 52°58′N 81°15′E
- Country: Russia
- Region: Altai Krai
- District: Zavyalovsky District
- Time zone: UTC+7:00

Ovechkino (Russian: Овечкино) is a rural locality (a station) in Ovechkinsky Selsoviet, Zavyalovsky District, Altai Krai, Russia. The population was 120 as of 2013. There are 3 streets.

== Geography ==
Ovechkino is located 24 km north-east from Zavyalovo (the district's administrative centre) by road.
