= Indychy =

Indychy Индычий
- Selo
- Location within Voronezh Oblast Location within Russia
- Coordinates: 50°14′N 40°50′E
- Country: Russia
- Region: Voronezh Oblast
- District: Petropavlovsky District
- Time zone: UTC+3:00

Indychy (Russian: Индычий) is a rural locality (a selo) in Staromelovatskoye Rural Settlement, Petropavlovsky District, Voronezh Oblast, Russia. The population was 539 as of 2010. There are 7 streets.

== Geography ==
Indychy is located 20 km north of Petropavlovka (the district's administrative centre) by road. Peski is the nearest rural locality.
