= Chumanka =

Chumanka Чуманка
- Selo
- Location within Altai Krai Location within Russia
- Coordinates: 53°30′N 80°27′E
- Country: Russia
- Region: Altai Krai
- District: Bayevsky District
- Time zone: UTC+7:00

Chumanka (Russian: Чуманка) is a rural locality (a selo) in Plotavsky Selsoviet, Bayevsky District, Altai Krai, Russia. The population was 193 as of 2013. There are 3 streets.

== Geography ==
Chumanka is located 44 km northwest of Bayevo (the district's administrative centre) by road. Plotava is the nearest rural locality.
