= Dedovka =

Dedovka Дедовка
- Selo
- Location within Voronezh Oblast Location within Russia
- Coordinates: 49°53′N 40°56′E
- Country: Russia
- Region: Voronezh Oblast
- District: Petropavlovsky District
- Time zone: UTC+3:00

Dedovka (Russian: Дедовка) is a rural locality (a selo) in Novolimanskoye Rural Settlement, Petropavlovsky District, Voronezh Oblast, Russia. The population was 342 as of 2010. There are 3 streets.

== Geography ==
Dedovka is located on the left bank of the Don River, 28 km south of Petropavlovka (the district's administrative centre) by road. Dedovochka is the nearest rural locality.
