= Novobogoroditskoye =

Novobogoroditskoye Новобогородицкое
- Selo
- Location within Voronezh Oblast Location within Russia
- Coordinates: 50°02′N 40°58′E
- Country: Russia
- Region: Voronezh Oblast
- District: Petropavlovsky District
- Time zone: UTC+3:00

Novobogoroditskoye (Russian: Новобогородицкое) is a rural locality (a selo) and the administrative center of Novobogoroditskoye Rural Settlement, Petropavlovsky District, Voronezh Oblast, Russia. The population was 731 as of 2010. There are 17 streets.

== Geography ==
Novobogoroditskoye is located 11 km southeast of Petropavlovka (the district's administrative centre) by road. Aleksandrovka is the nearest rural locality.
