= Krasnosyolovka =

Krasnosyolovka Красносёловка
- Selo
- Location within Voronezh Oblast Location within Russia
- Coordinates: 50°10′N 40°51′E
- Country: Russia
- Region: Voronezh Oblast
- District: Petropavlovsky District
- Time zone: UTC+3:00

Krasnosyolovka (Russian: Красносёловка) is a rural locality (a selo) and the administrative center of Krasnosyolovskoye Rural Settlement, Petropavlovsky District, Voronezh Oblast, Russia. The population was 1,502 as of 2010. There are 23 streets.

== Geography ==
Krasnosyolovka is located 11 km north of Petropavlovka (the district's administrative centre) by road. Indychy is the nearest rural locality.
