= Tumanovsky =

Tumanovsky Тумановский
- Settlement
- Location within Altai Krai Location within Russia
- Coordinates: 52°51′N 80°40′E
- Country: Russia
- Region: Altai Krai
- District: Zavyalovsky District
- Time zone: UTC+7:00

Tumanovsky (Russian: Тумановский) is a rural locality (a selo) and the administrative center of Tumanovsky Selsoviet of Zavyalovsky District, Altai Krai, Russia. The population was 525 as of 2016. There are 6 streets.

== Geography ==
Tumanovsky is located in the Kulunda Plain, 15 km west of Zavyalovo (the district's administrative centre) by road. Alexeyevka is the nearest rural locality.

== Ethnicity ==
The settlement is inhabited by Russians and others.
