= Proslaukha =

Proslaukha Прослауха
- Selo
- Location within Altai Krai Location within Russia
- Coordinates: 53°20′N 80°58′E
- Country: Russia
- Region: Altai Krai
- District: Bayevsky District
- Time zone: UTC+7:00

Proslaukha (Russian: Прослауха) is a rural locality (a selo) and the administrative center of Proslaukhinsky Selsoviet, Bayevsky District, Altai Krai, Russia. The population was 457 as of 2013. There are 10 streets.

== Geography ==
Proslaukha is located near the Kulunda River 17 km northeast of Bayevo (the district's administrative centre) by road. Kapustinka is the nearest rural locality.
