= Novokulikovsky =

Novokulikovsky Новокуликовский
- Settlement
- Location within Altai Krai Location within Russia
- Coordinates: 52°59′N 80°33′E
- Country: Russia
- Region: Altai Krai
- District: Zavyalovsky District
- Time zone: UTC+7:00

Novokulikovsky (Russian: Новокуликовский) is a rural locality (a settlement) in Glubokovsky Selsoviet, Zavyalovsky District, Altai Krai, Russia. The population was 116 as of 2013. There are 4 streets.

== Geography ==
Novokulikovsky is located 36 km northwest of Zavyalovo (the district's administrative centre) by road. Glubokoye is the nearest rural locality.
