= Nizhnechumanka =

Nizhnechumanka Нижнечуманка
- Selo
- Location within Altai Krai Location within Russia
- Coordinates: 53°13′N 80°35′E
- Country: Russia
- Region: Altai Krai
- District: Bayevsky District
- Time zone: UTC+7:00

Nizhnechumanka (Russian: Нижнечуманка) is a rural locality (a selo) and the administrative center of Nizhnechumansky Selsoviet, Bayevsky District, Altai Krai, Russia. The population was 861 as of 2013. There are 13 streets.

== Geography ==
Nizhnechumanka is located near the Kulunda river, 15 km southwest of Bayevo (the district's administrative centre) by road. Rybnye Borki is the nearest rural locality.
