= Ovechkino =

Ovechkino Овечкино
- Selo
- Location within Altai Krai Location within Russia
- Coordinates: 52°59′N 81°12′E
- Country: Russia
- Region: Altai Krai
- District: Zavyalovsky District
- Time zone: UTC+7:00

Ovechkino (Russian: Овечкино) is a rural locality (a selo) and the administrative center of Ovechkinsky Selsoviet, Zavyalovsky District, Altai Krai, Russia. The population was 618 as of 2013. There are 11 streets.

== Geography ==
Ovechkino is located 29 km northeast of Zavyalovo (the district's administrative centre) by road. Ovechkino (station) is the nearest rural locality.
