= Verkh-Payva =

Verkh-Payva Верх-Пайва
- Village
- Location within Altai Krai Location within Russia
- Coordinates: 53°24′N 80°18′E
- Country: Russia
- Region: Altai Krai
- District: Bayevsky District
- Time zone: UTC+7:00

Verkh-Payva (Russian: Верх-Пайва) is a rural locality (a selo) in Bayevsky District, Altai Krai, Russia. The population was 645 as of 2016. There are 18 streets.

== Geography ==
Verkh-Payva is located within the West-Siberian Plain, 55 km northwest of Bayevo (the district's administrative centre) by road. Verkh-Chumanka is the nearest rural locality.

== Ethnicity ==
The village is inhabited by Russians, Ukrainians and Germans.
