= Nizhnepayva =

Nizhnepayva Нижнепайва
- Village
- Location within Altai Krai Location within Russia
- Coordinates: 53°19′N 80°20′E
- Country: Russia
- Region: Altai Krai
- District: Bayevsky District
- Time zone: UTC+7:00

Nizhnepayva (Russian: Нижнепайва) is a rural locality (a selo) in Nizhnechumansky Selsoviet of Bayevsky District, Altai Krai, Russia. The population was 294 as of 2015. There are 13 streets.

== Geography ==
Nizhnepayva is located on the bank of the Payva River, 39 km northwest of Bayevo (the district's administrative centre) by road. Verkh-Payva is the nearest rural locality.

== Ethnicity ==
The village is inhabited by Russians and others.
