= Glubokoye, Voronezh Oblast =

Glubokoye Глубокое
- Selo
- Location within Voronezh Oblast Location within Russia
- Coordinates: 49°52′N 40°56′E
- Country: Russia
- Region: Voronezh Oblast
- District: Petropavlovsky District
- Time zone: UTC+3:00

Glubokoye (Russian: Глубокое) is a rural locality (a selo) in Novolimanskoye Rural Settlement, Petropavlovsky District, Voronezh Oblast, Russia. The population was 228 as of 2010. There are 4 streets.

== Geography ==
Glubokoye is located 29 km south of Petropavlovka (the district's administrative centre) by road. Dedovka is the nearest rural locality.
