= Glubokoye, Altai Krai =

Glubokoye Глубокое
- Selo
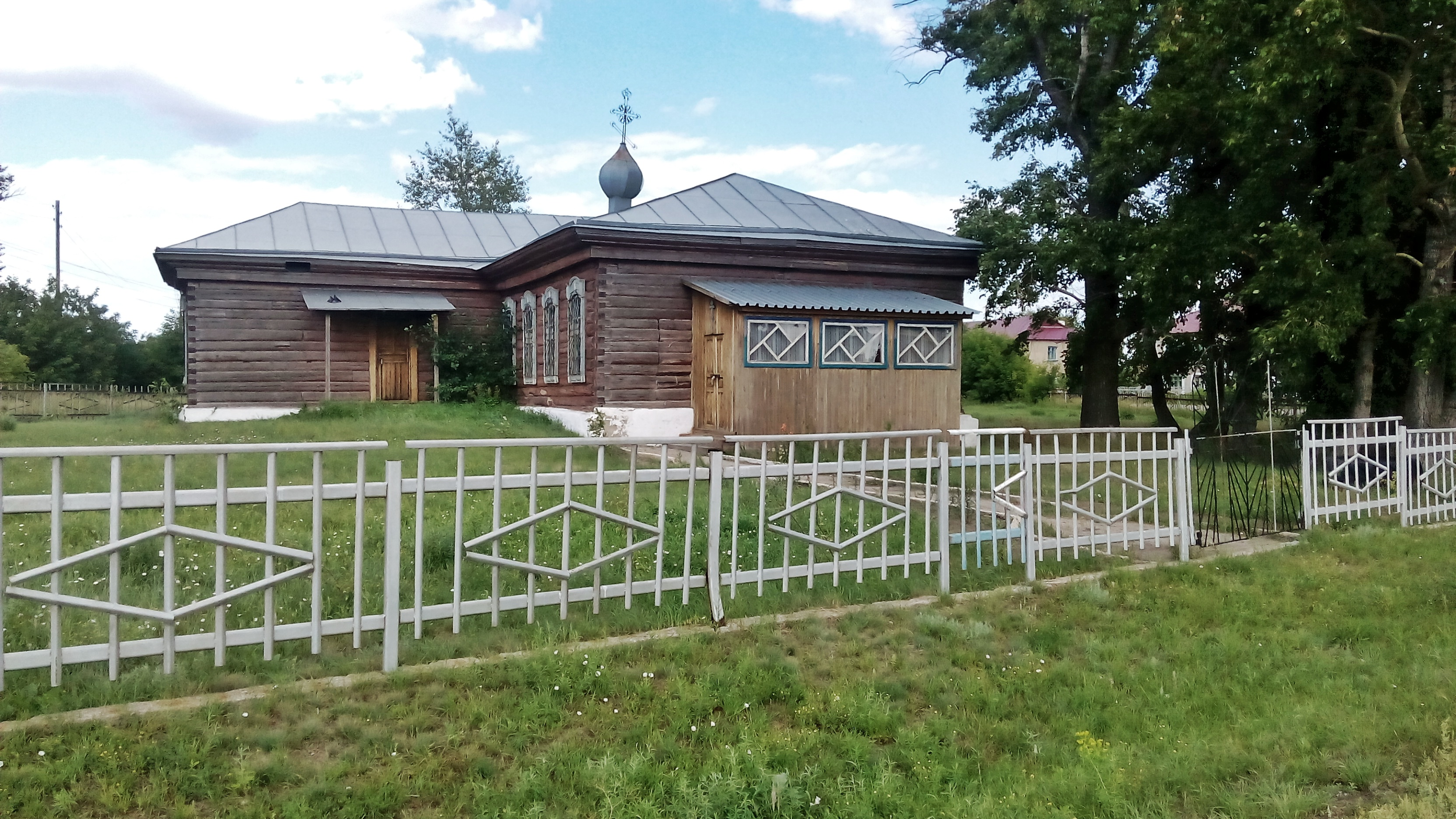
- Old abandoned church

- Location within Altai Krai Location within Russia
- Coordinates: 52°59′N 80°41′E
- Country: Russia
- Region: Altai Krai
- District: Zavyalovsky District
- Time zone: UTC+7:00

Glubokoye (Russian: Глубокое) is a rural locality (a selo) and the administrative center of Glubokovsky Selsoviet, Zavyalovsky District, Altai Krai, Russia. The population was 1,508 as of 2013. There are 24 streets.

== Geography ==
Glubokoye is located 28 km northwest of Zavyalovo (the district's administrative centre) by road. Malinovsky is the nearest rural locality.
