= Bayevsky =

Bayevsky (masculine), Bayevskaya (feminine), or Bayevskoye (neuter) may refer to:

- Bayevsky District, a district of Altai Krai, Russia
- Bayevsky (rural locality), a rural locality (a settlement) in Oryol Oblast, Russia
