= Kamyshenka, Zavyalovsky District, Altai Krai =

Kamyshenka Камышенка
- Village
- Location within Altai Krai Location within Russia
- Coordinates: 52°42′N 80°36′E
- Country: Russia
- Region: Altai Krai
- District: Zavyalovsky District
- Time zone: UTC+7:00

Kamyshenka (Russian: Камышенка) is a rural locality (a selo) in Zavyalovsky District, Altai Krai, Russia. The population was 877 as of 2016. There are 14 streets.

== Geography ==
Kamyshenka is located 28 km southwest of Zavyalovo (the district's administrative centre) by road. Chernavka is the nearest rural locality.

== Ethnicity ==
The village is inhabited by Ukrainians and others.
