= Nyubskaya narrow-gauge railway =

Railway in Arkhangelsk Oblast, Russia

Coordinates: 61.39724°N 47.49889°E

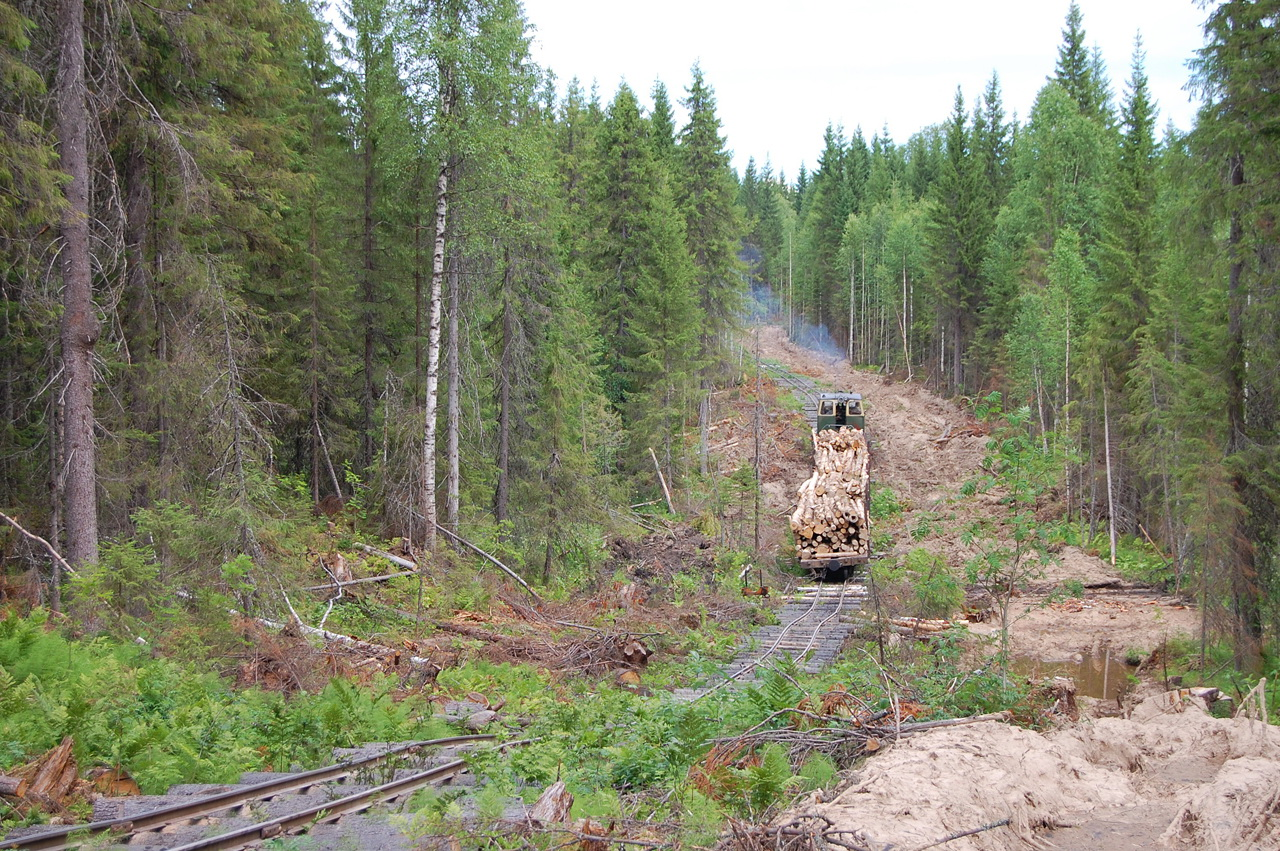

Overview
- Locale: Arkhangelsk Oblast, Russia
- Termini: Kharitonovo
- Website: www.ilimgroup.com

Service
- Type: Narrow-gauge railway
- Operator: OJSC «Ilim Group»

History
- Opened: 1934

Technical
- Line length: 50 kilometres (31 mi)
- Track gauge: 750 mm (2 ft 5 1/2 in)
Route map
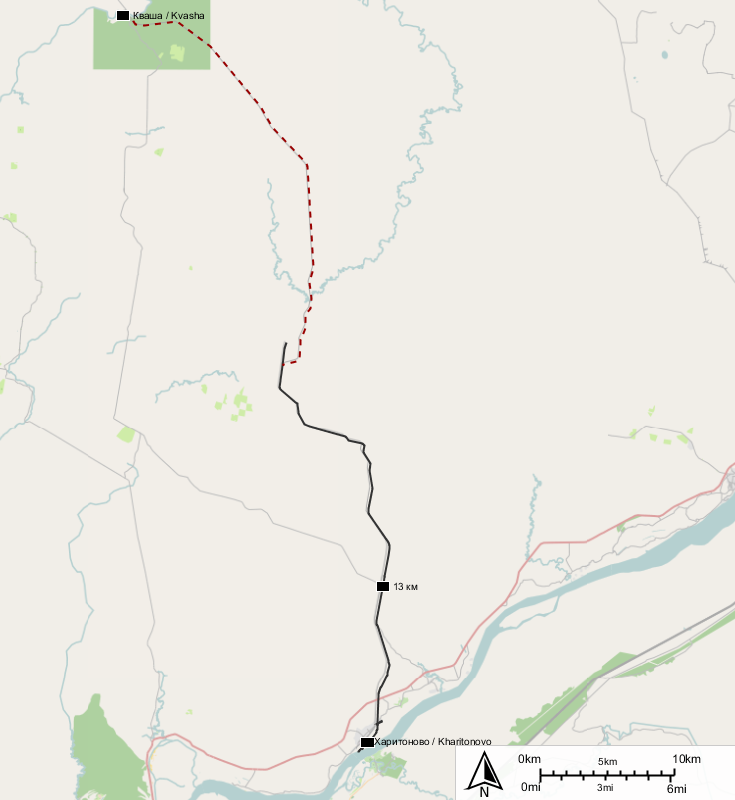

The Nyubskaya narrow-gauge railway is located in Arkhangelsk Oblast, Russia. The forest railway was opened in 1934, has a total length of 50 kilometres (31 mi) and is operational as of 2015. The track gauge is 750 mm (2 ft 5 1/2 in) and operates year-round.

== Current status ==
The Nyubskaya forestry railway's first line was constructed in 1934, in the area of Kotlassky District, Arkhangelsk Oblast from the village Kharitonovo. The total length of the Nyubskaya narrow-gauge railway at the peak of its development exceeded 191 kilometres (119 mi), of which 50 kilometres (31 mi) is currently operational. The railway operates scheduled freight services from Kharitonovo, used for forestry tasks such as the transportation of felled logs and forestry workers.

== Rolling stock ==
=== Locomotives ===
- TU6D – № 0235
- TU6A – № 2800, 3169
- TU7A – № 3289
- TU8 – № 0006, 0181, 0527, 0334

=== Railroad cars ===
- Boxcar
- Tank car
- Snowplow
- Dining car
- Crane LT-110
- Passenger car
- Railway log-car and Flatcar
- Hopper car to transport track ballast

== Gallery ==
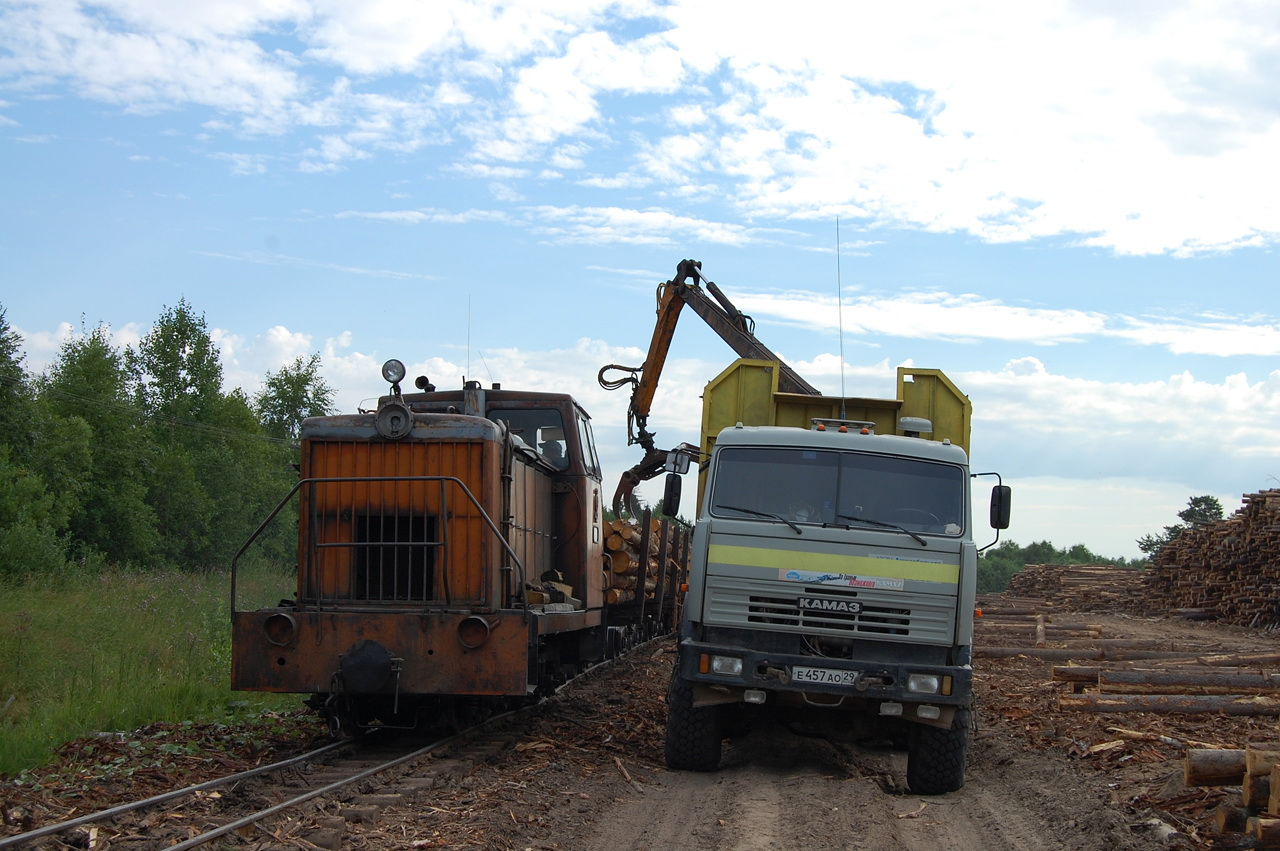
Unloading timber

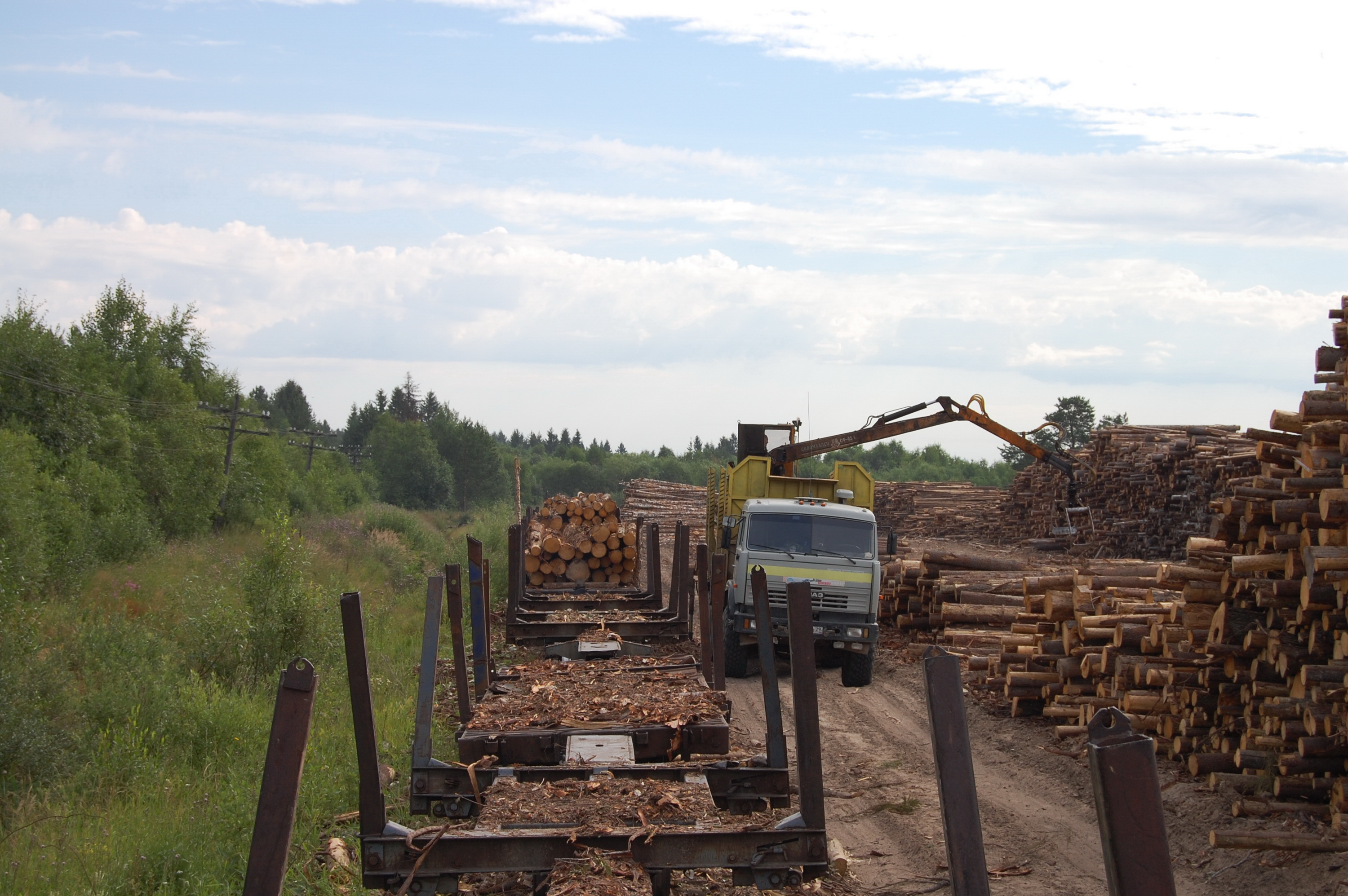
Unloading timber

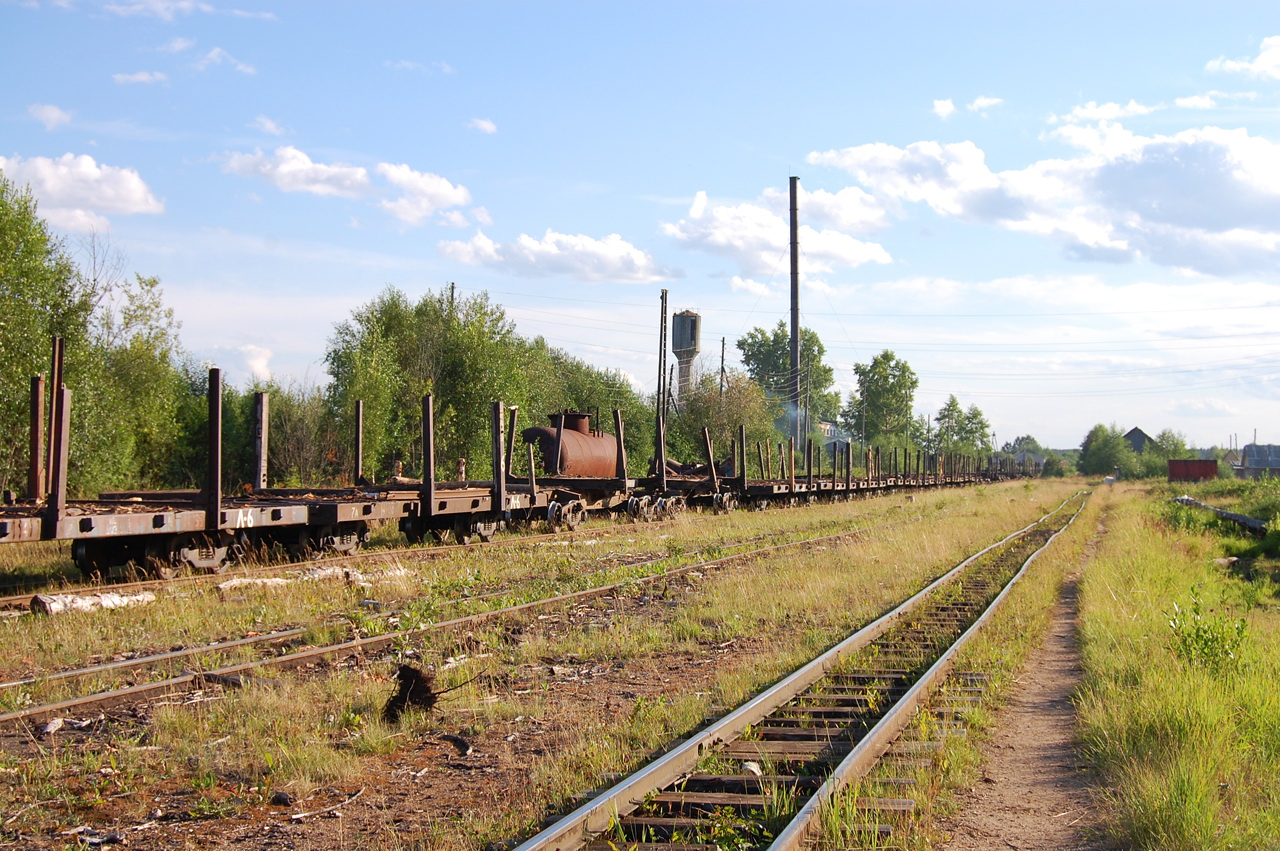
Kharitonovo freight station

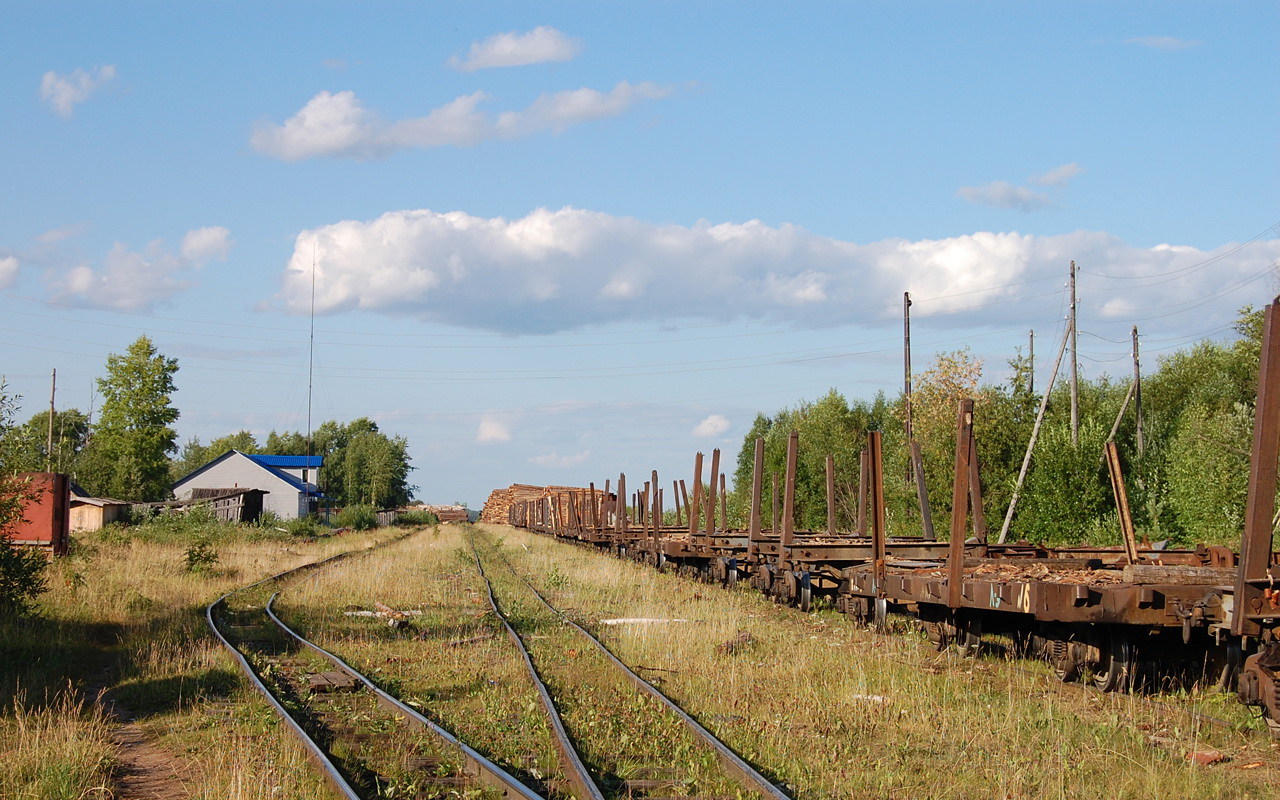
Kharitonovo freight station

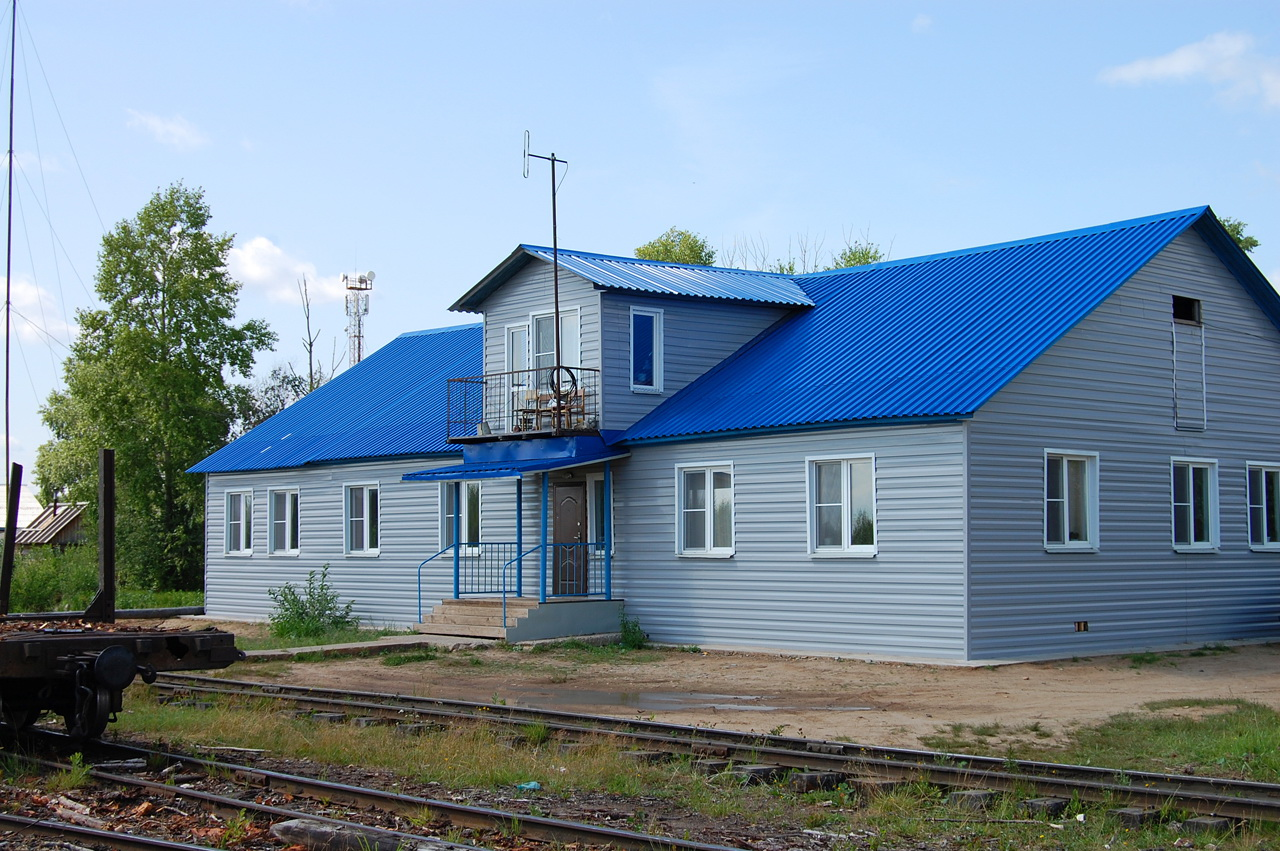
Railway Office, Kharitonovo

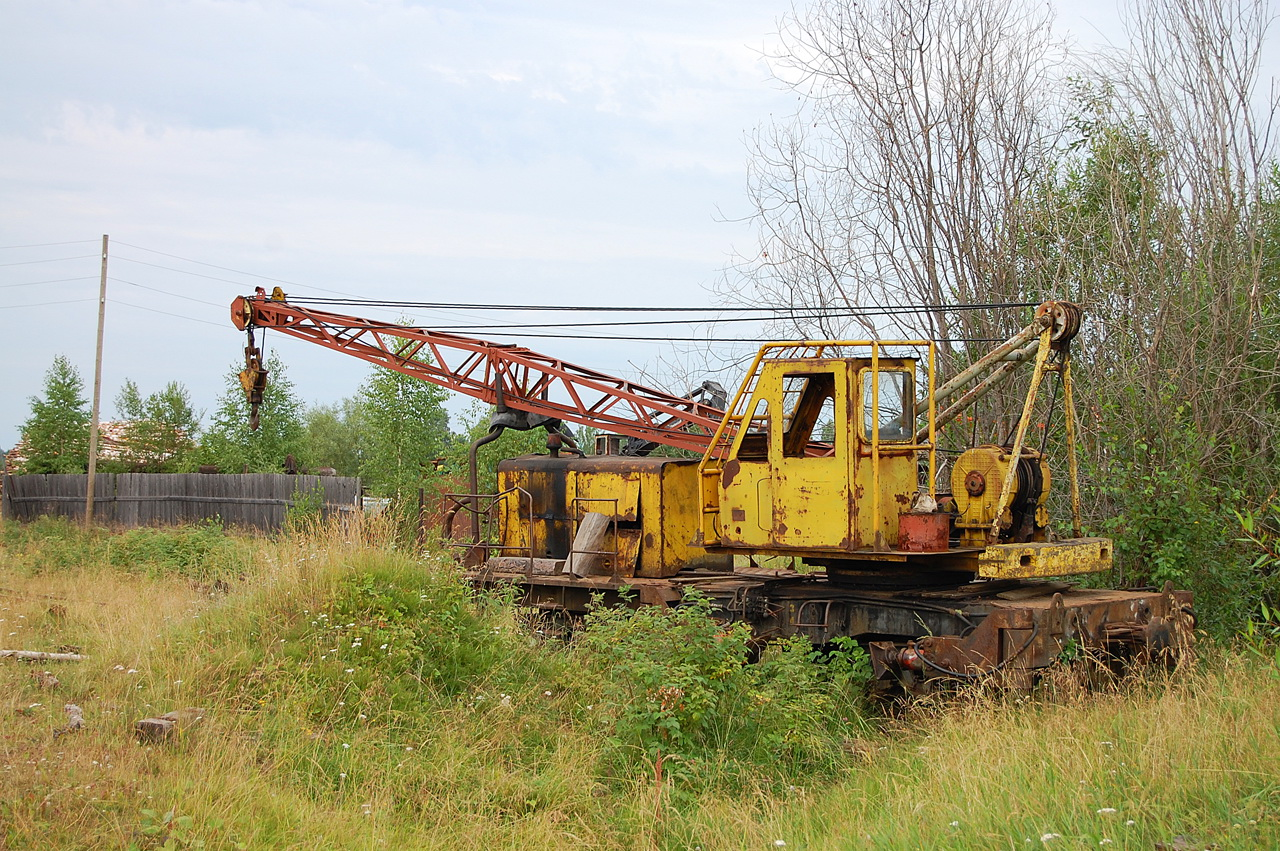
Crane LT-110

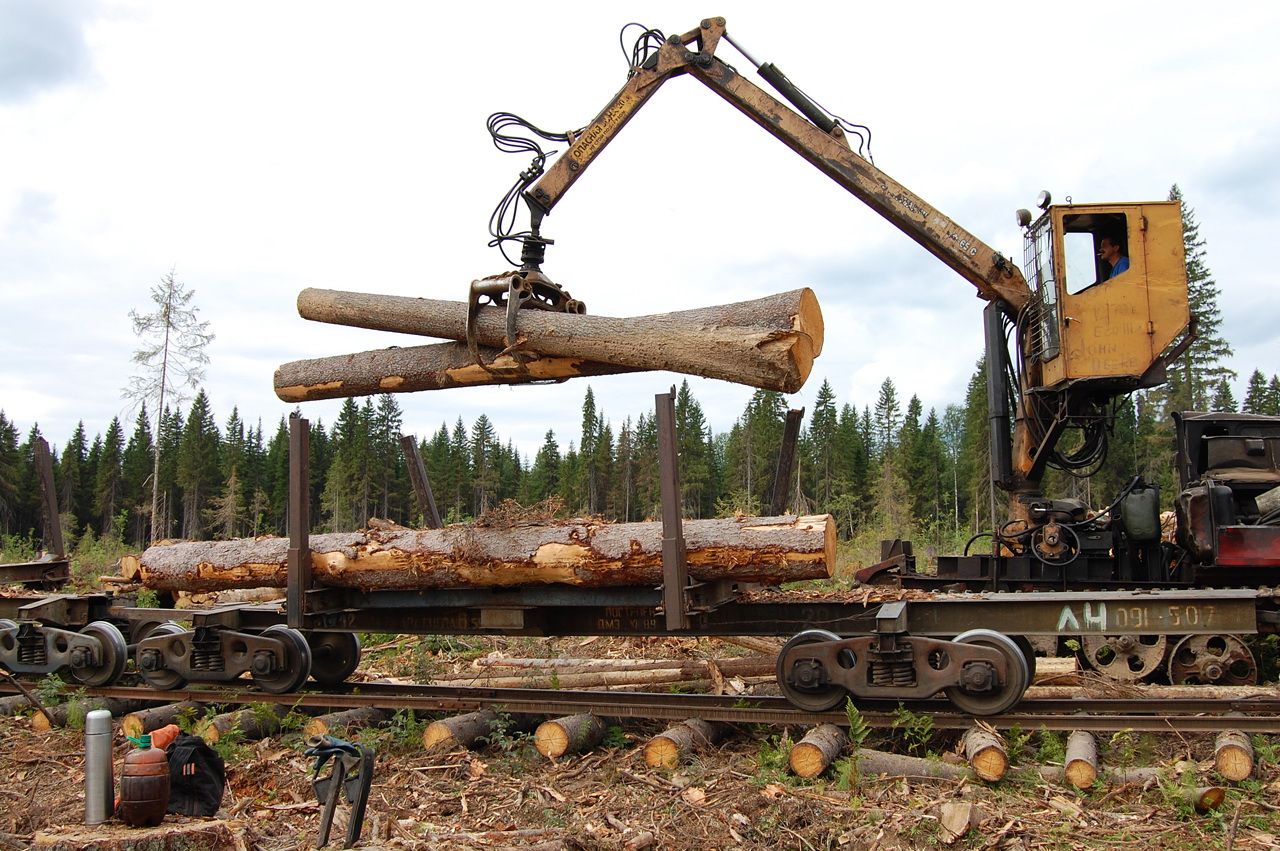
Loading timber

== See also ==
- Narrow-gauge railways in Russia
- List of Russian narrow-gauge railways rolling stock
