= Kharitonovo =

Kharitonovo Харитоново
- Village
- Location within Altai Krai Location within Russia
- Coordinates: 53°01′N 80°56′E
- Country: Russia
- Region: Altai Krai
- District: Zavyalovsky District
- Time zone: UTC+7:00

Kharitonovo (Russian: Харитоново) is a rural locality (a selo) and the administrative center of Kharitonovsky Selsoviet of Zavyalovsky District, Altai Krai, Russia. The population was 1048 as of 2016. There are 11 streets.

== Geography ==
Kharitonovo is located in the Kulunda Plain on the eastern bank of the Mostovoye lake, 33 kilometers (21 mi) north of Zavyalovo (the district's administrative centre) by road. Malinovsky is the nearest rural locality.

== Ethnicity ==
The village is inhabited by Russians and others.
