= Svetloye, Altai Krai =

Svetloye Светлое
- Village
- Location within Altai Krai Location within Russia
- Coordinates: 52°54′N 81°03′E
- Country: Russia
- Region: Altai Krai
- District: Zavyalovsky District
- Time zone: UTC+7:00

Svetloye (Russian: Светлое) is a rural locality (a selo) and the administrative center of Svetlovsky Selsoviet of Zavyalovsky District, Altai Krai, Russia. The population was 525 as of 2016.

== Geography ==
Svetloye is located in the Kulunda Plain on the south-west bank of the Dolgoye Lake and the north bank of the Plotinnoye Lake, 15 km southwest of Zavyalovo (the district's administrative centre) by road. Zavyalovo is the nearest rural locality.

== Ethnicity ==
The village is inhabited by Russians and others.
