= Pokrovka, Bayevsky District, Altai Krai =

Pokrovka Покровка
- Selo
- Location within Altai Krai Location within Russia
- Coordinates: 53°07′N 80°29′E
- Country: Russia
- Region: Altai Krai
- District: Bayevsky District
- Time zone: UTC+7:00

Pokrovka (Russian: Покровка) is a rural locality (a selo) in Bayevsky District, Altai Krai, Russia. The population was 226 as of 2013. There are 3 streets.

== Geography ==
Pokrovka is located near the Kulunda River 29 km southwest of Bayevo (the district's administrative centre) by road. Rybnye Borki is the nearest rural locality.
