= Zavyalovsky District =

Location of Altai Krai in Russia

Location of Udmurt Republic in Russia

Zavyalovsky District is the name of several administrative and municipal districts in Russia:

- Zavyalovsky District, Altai Krai, an administrative and municipal district of Altai Krai
- Zavyalovsky District, Udmurt Republic, an administrative and municipal district of the Udmurt Republic
