= Shimolino =

Shimolino Шимолино
- Selo
- Location within Altai Krai Location within Russia
- Coordinates: 52°59′N 79°58′E
- Country: Russia
- Region: Altai Krai
- District: Blagoveshchensky District
- Time zone: UTC+7:00

Shimolino (Russian: Шимолино) is a rural locality (a selo) and the administrative center of Shimolinsky Selsoviet, Blagoveshchensky District, Altai Krai, Russia. The population was 828 as of 2013. There are 9 streets.

== Geography ==
Shimolino is located near the Kulunda 29 km (18 mi) northeast of Blagoveshchenka (the district's administrative centre) by road. Mikhaylovka is the nearest rural locality.
