= Lake Glubokoye =

Glubokoye Lake (Russian: Глубокое озеро, literally: "Deep Lake") may refer to one of the following.

- Lake Glubokoye (Antarctica)
- Profound Lake, Antarctica
- Lake Glubokoye (Putorana), near Norilsk, Russia
- Lake Glubokoye (Karelian Isthmus), in Vyborgsky District of Leningrad Oblast, Russia
