= Andronovo, Altai Krai =

Andronovo Андроново
- Selo
- Location within Altai Krai Location within Russia
- Coordinates: 53°19′N 81°11′E
- Country: Russia
- Region: Altai Krai
- District: Tyumentsevsky District
- Time zone: UTC+7:00

Andronovo (Russian: Андроново) is a rural locality (a selo) and the administrative center of Andronovsky Selsoviet, Tyumentsevsky District, Altai Krai, Russia. The population was 471 as of 2013. It was founded in 1726. There are 9 streets.

== Geography ==
Andronovo is located near the Kulunda River 22 km west of Tyumentsevo (the district's administrative centre) by road. Gryaznovo is the nearest rural locality.
