= Pokrovka, Blagoveshchensky District, Republic of Bashkortostan =

Pokrovka Покровка
- Selo
- Location within Bashkortostan Location within Russia
- Coordinates: 55°14′N 56°16′E
- Country: Russia
- Region: Bashkortostan
- District: Blagoveshchensky District

Population (2010)
  - Total: 455
- Time zone: UTC+5:00
- Postal code: 453445

Pokrovka (Russian: Покровка) is a rural locality (a selo) and the administrative centre of Pokrovsky Selsoviet, Blagoveshchensky District, Bashkortostan, Russia. The population was 455 as of 2010. There are 6 streets.

== Geography ==
Pokrovka is located 40 km northeast of Blagoveshchensk (the district's administrative centre) by road. Klyuchi is the nearest rural locality.
