= Kulunda (river) =

River in Siberia, Russia

Kulunda Кулунда
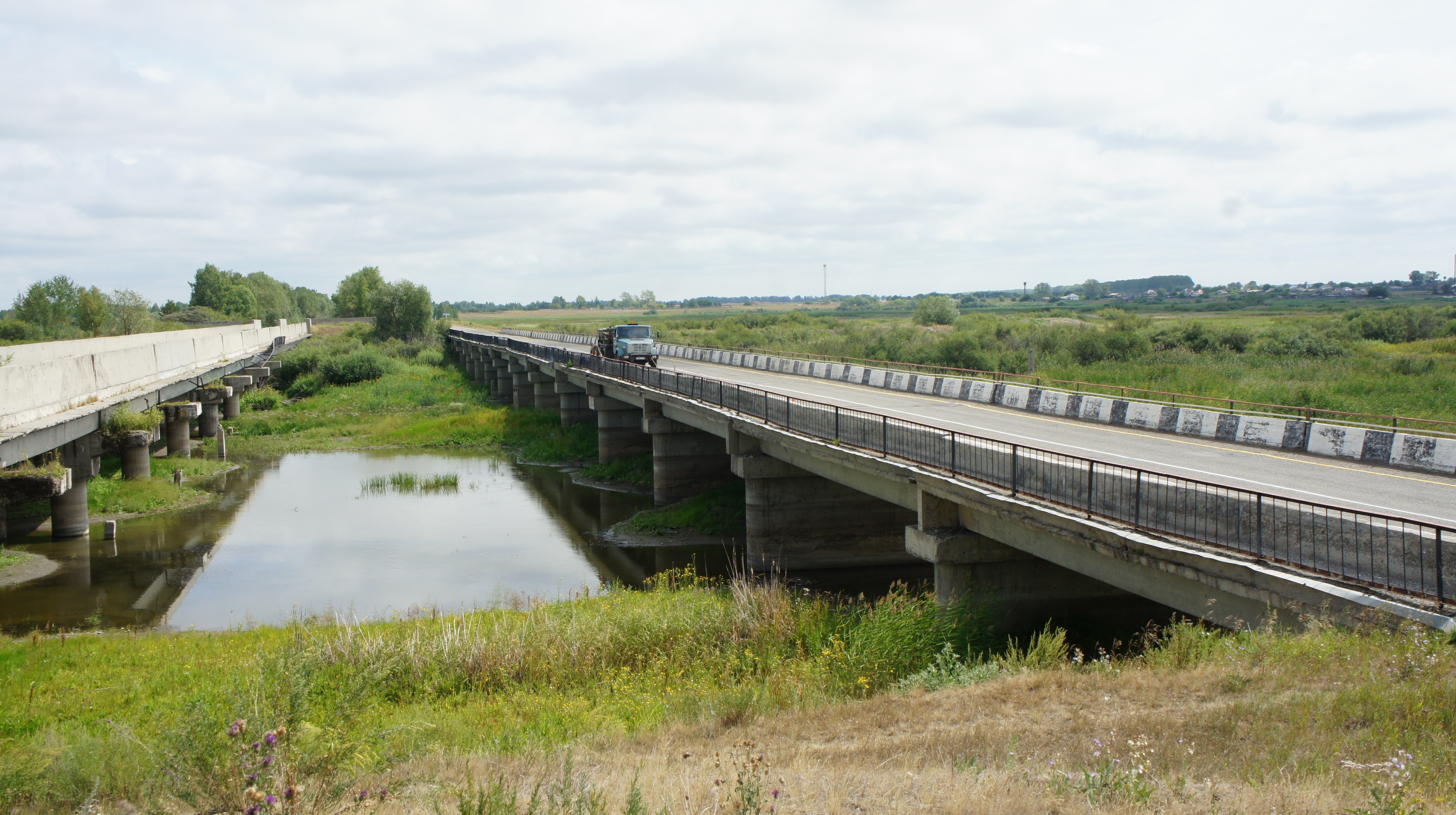
- Bridge over the Kulunda

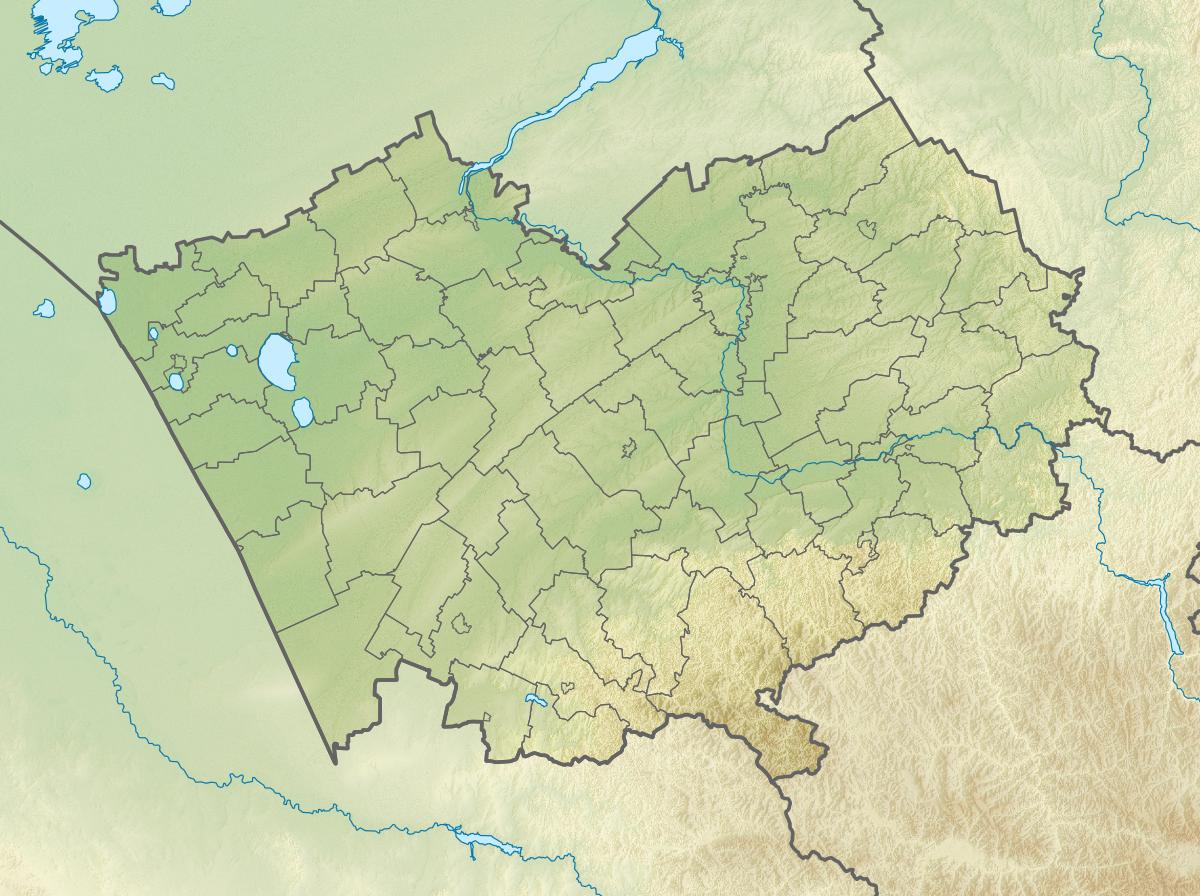
- Mouth location in Altai Krai, Russia

Location
- Country: Russia

Physical characteristics
- Source: Ob Plateau
  - coordinates: 53°18′02″N 82°08′04″E
  - elevation: ca 200 metres (660 ft)
- Mouth: Lake Kulunda
  - coordinates: 52°58′52″N 79°43′22″E
  - elevation: 99 metres (325 ft)
- Length: 412 km (256 mi)
- Basin size: 12,400 km^{2} (4,800 sq mi)
- Discharge
  - average: 5.27 m^{3}/s (186 cu ft/s)

The Kulunda (Russian: Кулунда) is a river in Altai Krai, Russia. The river is 412 kilometres (256 mi) long and has a catchment area of 12,400 square kilometres (4,800 sq mi).

The basin of the river is located in the Rebrikhinsky, Tyumentsevsky, Bayevsky and Blagoveshchensky districts. There are a number of villages near its banks, such as Bayevo, Pokrovka, Kapustinka, Proslaukha and Gryaznovo.

== Course ==
The Kulunda river system is an endorheic basin between the Ob and the Irtysh rivers. The sources are in the Ob Plateau. The river flows roughly southwestwards through one of the wide ravines of glacial origin that are characteristic of the plateau. As it descends to the Kulunda Plain there are many lakes in its basin, especially close to Andronovo and Nizhnechumanka. Near its mouth the river turns westwards. Finally it meets the eastern shore of Lake Kulunda about 5 km (3.1 mi) west of Shimolino.

=== Tributaries ===
The main tributaries of the Kulunda are the 88 km (55 mi) long Chuman (Чуман), the 78 km (48 mi) long Proslaukha (Прослауха), and the 56 km (35 mi) long Cheremshanka (Черемшанка) from the right, as well as the 37 km (23 mi) long Yermachikha (Ермачиха) from the left.

== See also ==
- List of rivers of Russia
