= Klyuchi, Blagoveshchensky District, Republic of Bashkortostan =

Klyuchi Ключи
- Village
- Location within Bashkortostan Location within Russia
- Coordinates: 55°12′N 56°17′E
- Country: Russia
- Region: Bashkortostan
- District: Blagoveshchensky District
- Time zone: UTC+5:00

Klyuchi (Russian: Ключи) is a rural locality (a village) in Pokrovsky Selsoviet, Blagoveshchensky District, Bashkortostan, Russia. The population was 9 as of 2010. There is 1 street.

== Geography ==
Klyuchi is located 44 km northeast of Blagoveshchensk (the district's administrative centre) by road. Pokrovka is the nearest rural locality.
