= Pokrovka, Bichursky District, Republic of Buryatia =

Pokrovka Покровка
- Selo
- Location within Republic of Buryatia Location within Russia
- Coordinates: 50°42′N 107°27′E
- Country: Russia
- Region: Republic of Buryatia
- District: Bichursky District
- Time zone: UTC+8:00

Pokrovka (Russian: Покровка) is a rural locality (a selo) in Bichursky District, Republic of Buryatia, Russia. The population was 298 as of 2010. There are 2 streets.

== Geography ==
Pokrovka is located 20 km northwest of Bichura (the district's administrative centre) by road. Sudutuy is the nearest rural locality.
