= Pokrovka, Pribaykalsky District, Republic of Buryatia =

Pokrovka Покровка
- Selo
- Location within Republic of Buryatia Location within Russia
- Coordinates: 52°09′N 107°17′E
- Country: Russia
- Region: Republic of Buryatia
- District: Pribaykalsky District
- Time zone: UTC+8:00

Pokrovka (Russian: Покровка) is a rural locality (a selo) in Pribaykalsky District, Republic of Buryatia, Russia. The population was 242 as of 2010. There are 3 streets.

== Geography ==
Pokrovka is located 26 km southwest of Turuntayevo (the district's administrative centre) by road. Ilyinka is the nearest rural locality.
