= Pokrovka, Naumovsky Selsoviet, Sterlitamaksky District, Republic of Bashkortostan =

Pokrovka Покровка
- Village
- Location within Bashkortostan Location within Russia
- Coordinates: 53°32′N 55°56′E
- Country: Russia
- Region: Bashkortostan
- District: Sterlitamaksky District
- Time zone: UTC+5:00

Pokrovka (Russian: Покровка) is a rural locality (a village) in Naumovsky Selsoviet, Sterlitamaksky District, Bashkortostan, Russia. The population was 562 as of 2010.

== Geography ==
It is located 10 km from Sterlitamak, 3 km from Naumovka.
