= Pokrovka, Verkhnekhavsky District, Voronezh Oblast =

Pokrovka Покровка
- Selo
- Location within Voronezh Oblast Location within Russia
- Coordinates: 51°54′N 40°06′E
- Country: Russia
- Region: Voronezh Oblast
- District: Verkhnekhavsky District
- Time zone: UTC+3:00

Pokrovka (Russian: Покровка) is a rural locality (a selo) in Plyasovatskoye Rural Settlement, Verkhnekhavsky District, Voronezh Oblast, Russia. The population was 95 as of 2010.

== Geography ==
Pokrovka is located 19 km northeast of Verkhnyaya Khava (the district's administrative centre) by road. Plyasovatka is the nearest rural locality.
