= Pokrovka, Podgorensky District, Voronezh Oblast =

Pokrovka Покровка
- Khutor
- Location within Voronezh Oblast Location within Russia
- Coordinates: 50°20′N 39°36′E
- Country: Russia
- Region: Voronezh Oblast
- District: Podgorensky District
- Time zone: UTC+3:00

Pokrovka (Russian: Покро́вка) is a rural locality (a khutor) in Pervomayskoye Rural Settlement, Podgorensky District, Voronezh Oblast, Russia. The population was 54 as of 2010.

== Geography ==
Pokrovka is located 12 km south of Podgorensky (the district's administrative centre) by road. Sud-Nikolayevka is the nearest rural locality.
