= Pokrovka, Dyurtyulinsky District, Republic of Bashkortostan =

Pokrovka Покровка
- Village
- Location within Bashkortostan Location within Russia
- Coordinates: 55°42′N 54°57′E
- Country: Russia
- Region: Bashkortostan
- District: Dyurtyulinsky District
- Time zone: UTC+5:00

Pokrovka (Russian: Покровка) is a rural locality (a village) in Mayadykovsky Selsoviet, Dyurtyulinsky District, Bashkortostan, Russia. The population was 10 as of 2010. There is 1 street.

== Geography ==
Pokrovka is located 40 km north of Dyurtyuli (the district's administrative centre) by road. Atachevo is the nearest rural locality.
