= Lake Profound =

Lake in Antarctica

- Location within Antarctica
- Location: Fildes Peninsula, King George Island, Antarctica
- Coordinates: 62°11′07″S 58°54′40″W
- Basin countries: (Antarctica)

Profound Lake or Lake Profound (62°11′S 58°55′W) is a lake 400 metres (1/4 mi) northwest of Jasper Point in northeast Fildes Peninsula, King George Island. The feature was named "Ozero Glubokoye" (deep lake) by the Soviet Antarctic Expedition working from Bellingshausen Station from 1968, but both forms of the name were already in use in Antarctica. The United Kingdom Antarctic Place-Names Committee (UK-APC) amended the name in 1979 to avoid duplication.
