= Pokrovka, Iglinsky District, Republic of Bashkortostan =

Pokrovka Покровка
- Village
- Location within Bashkortostan Location within Russia
- Coordinates: 54°56′N 56°39′E
- Country: Russia
- Region: Bashkortostan
- District: Iglinsky District
- Time zone: UTC+5:00

Pokrovka (Russian: Покровка) is a rural locality (a village) in Tavtimanovsky Selsoviet, Iglinsky District, Bashkortostan, Russia. The population was 143 as of 2010. There are 2 streets.

== Geography ==
Pokrovka is located 23 km northeast of Iglino (the district's administrative centre) by road. Spasskoye is the nearest rural locality.
