= Pokrovka, Karmaskalinsky District, Republic of Bashkortostan =

Pokrovka Покровка
- Village
- Location within Bashkortostan Location within Russia
- Coordinates: 54°21′N 56°22′E
- Country: Russia
- Region: Bashkortostan
- District: Karmaskalinsky District
- Time zone: UTC+5:00

Pokrovka (Russian: Покровка) is a rural locality (a village) in Karlamansky Selsoviet, Karmaskalinsky District, Bashkortostan, Russia. The population was 47 as of 2010. There is one street.

== Geography ==
Pokrovka is located 23 km east of Karmaskaly (the district's administrative centre) by road. Sakharozavodskaya is the nearest rural locality.
