= Pokrovka, Aurgazinsky District, Republic of Bashkortostan =

Village in Bashkortostan, Russia

Pokrovka Покровка
- Village
- Location within Bashkortostan Location within Russia
- Coordinates: 54°10′N 56°03′E
- Country: Russia
- Region: Bashkortostan
- District: Aurgazinsky District
- Time zone: UTC+5:00

Pokrovka (Russian: Покровка) is a rural locality (a village) in Ismagilovsky Selsoviet, Aurgazinsky District, Bashkortostan, Russia. The population was 17 as of 2010. There is 1 street.

== Geography ==
Pokrovka is located 32 km northeast of Tolbazy (the district's administrative centre) by road. Abdullino is the nearest rural locality.
