= Pokrovka, Abzelilovsky District, Republic of Bashkortostan =

Pokrovka Покровка
- Village
- Location within Bashkortostan Location within Russia
- Coordinates: 53°36′N 58°49′E
- Country: Russia
- Region: Bashkortostan
- District: Abzelilovsky District
- Time zone: UTC+5:00

Pokrovka (Russian: Покровка) is a rural locality (a village) in Krasnobashkirsky Selsoviet, Abzelilovsky District, Bashkortostan, Russia. The population was 226 as of 2010. There are 5 streets.

== Geography ==
Pokrovka is located 51 km northeast of Askarovo (the district's administrative centre) by road. Smelovsky is the nearest rural locality.
