= Pokrovka, Kuganaksky Selsoviet, Sterlitamaksky District, Republic of Bashkortostan =

Pokrovka Покровка
- Selo
- Location within Bashkortostan Location within Russia
- Coordinates: 53°51′N 56°08′E
- Country: Russia
- Region: Bashkortostan
- District: Sterlitamaksky District
- Time zone: UTC+5:00

Pokrovka (Russian: Покровка) is a rural locality (a selo) in Kuganaksky Selsoviet, Sterlitamaksky District, Bashkortostan, Russia. The population was 843 as of 2010.

== Geography ==
It is located 30 km from Sterlitamak, 7 km from Bolshoy Kuganak.
