= Pokrovka, Volgograd Oblast =

Pokrovka Покровка
- Selo
- Location within Volgograd Oblast Location within Russia
- Coordinates: 48°28′N 45°02′E
- Country: Russia
- Region: Volgograd Oblast
- District: Leninsky District
- Time zone: UTC+4:00

Pokrovka (Russian: Покровка) is a rural locality (a selo) and the administrative center of Pokrovskoye Rural Settlement, Leninsky District, Volgograd Oblast, Russia. The population was 772 as of 2010. There are 13 streets.

== Geography ==
The village is located on Caspian Depression, on the left bank of the Volozhka, 67 km from Volgograd, 36 km from Leninsk.
