= Pokrovka, Sharansky District, Republic of Bashkortostan =

Pokrovka Покровка
- Village
- Location within Bashkortostan Location within Russia
- Coordinates: 54°55′N 54°20′E
- Country: Russia
- Region: Bashkortostan
- District: Sharansky District
- Time zone: UTC+5:00

Pokrovka (Russian: Покровка) is a rural locality (a village) in Michurinsky Selsoviet, Sharansky District, Bashkortostan, Russia. The population was 8 as of 2010. There is 1 street.

== Geography ==
Pokrovka is located 66 km northeast of Sharan (the district's administrative centre) by road. Novopuchkakovo is the nearest rural locality.
