= Pokrovka, Tuymazinsky District, Republic of Bashkortostan =

Pokrovka Покровка
- Village
- Location within Bashkortostan Location within Russia
- Coordinates: 54°44′N 53°46′E
- Country: Russia
- Region: Bashkortostan
- District: Tuymazinsky District
- Time zone: UTC+5:00

Pokrovka (Russian: Покровка) is a rural locality (a village) in Tyumenyakovsky Selsoviet, Tuymazinsky District, Bashkortostan, Russia. The population was 143 as of 2010. There is 1 street.

== Geography ==
Pokrovka is located 20 km north of Tuymazy (the district's administrative centre) by road. Tash-Kichu is the nearest rural locality.
