= Pokrovka, Volokonovsky District, Belgorod Oblast =

Pokrovka Покровка
- Selo
- Location within Belgorod Oblast Location within Russia
- Coordinates: 50°30′N 37°59′E
- Country: Russia
- Region: Belgorod Oblast
- District: Volokonovsky District
- Time zone: UTC+3:00

Pokrovka (Russian: Покровка) is a rural locality (a selo) and the administrative center of Pokrovskoye Rural Settlement, Volokonovsky District, Belgorod Oblast, Russia. The population was 915 as of 2010. There are 9 streets.

== Geography ==
Pokrovka is located 14 km northeast of Volokonovka (the district's administrative centre) by road. Shchepkin is the nearest rural locality.
