= Glubokoye, Totemsky District, Vologda Oblast =

Glubokoye Глубокое
- Settlement
- Location within Vologda Oblast Location within Russia
- Coordinates: 59°57′N 42°44′E
- Country: Russia
- Region: Vologda Oblast
- District: Totemsky District
- Time zone: UTC+3:00

Glubokoye (Russian: Глубокое) is a rural locality (a settlement) in Pyatovskoye Rural Settlement, Totemsky District, Vologda Oblast, Russia. The population was 187 as of 2010. There are 3 streets.

== Geography ==
Glubokoye is located 3 km southwest of Totma (the district's administrative centre) by road. Zadnyaya is the nearest rural locality.
