= Pokrovka, Ufimsky District, Republic of Bashkortostan =

Pokrovka Покровка
- Village
- Location within Bashkortostan Location within Russia
- Coordinates: 54°56′N 56°16′E
- Country: Russia
- Region: Bashkortostan
- District: Ufimsky District
- Time zone: UTC+5:00

Pokrovka (Russian: Покровка) is a rural locality (a village) in Cherkassky Selsoviet, Ufimsky District, Bashkortostan, Russia. The population was 65 as of 2010. There are 5 streets.

== Geography ==
Pokrovka is located 37 km northeast of Ufa (the district's administrative centre) by road. Chuvarez is the nearest rural locality.
