= Pokrovka, Astrakhan Oblast =

Pokrovka Покровка
- Selo
- Location within Astrakhan Oblast Location within Russia
- Coordinates: 48°21′N 46°04′E
- Country: Russia
- Region: Astrakhan Oblast
- District: Akhtubinsky District
- Time zone: UTC+4:00

Pokrovka (Russian: Покровка) is a rural locality (a selo) and the administrative center of Pokrovsky Selsoviet of Akhtubinsky District, Astrakhan Oblast, Russia. The population was 1,070 as of 2010. There are 23 streets.

== Geography ==
Pokrovka is located 13 km northwest of Akhtubinsk (the district's administrative centre) by road. Akhtubinsk is the nearest rural locality.
