= Pokrovka, Bakalinsky District, Republic of Bashkortostan =

Pokrovka Покровка
- Village
- Location within Bashkortostan Location within Russia
- Coordinates: 55°13′N 53°48′E
- Country: Russia
- Region: Bashkortostan
- District: Bakalinsky District
- Time zone: UTC+5:00

Pokrovka (Russian: Покровка) is a rural locality (a village) in Starosharashlinsky Selsoviet, Bakalinsky District, Bashkortostan, Russia. The population was 17 as of 2010. There are 2 streets.

== Geography ==
Pokrovka is located 5 km north of Bakaly (the district's administrative centre) by road. Verkhnetroitskoye is the nearest rural locality.
