= Pokrovka, Klyuchevsky District, Altai Krai =

Pokrovka Покровка
- Village
- Location within Altai Krai Location within Russia
- Coordinates: 52°02′N 79°21′E
- Country: Russia
- Region: Altai Krai
- District: Klyuchevsky District
- Time zone: UTC+7:00

Pokrovka (Russian: Покровка) is a rural locality (a selo) and the administrative center of Pokrovsky Selsoviet of Klyuchevsky District, Altai Krai, Russia. The population was 481 as of 2016. There are 6 streets.

== Geography ==
Pokrovka is located 29 km southeast of Klyuchi (the district's administrative centre) by road. Severka is the nearest rural locality.

== Ethnicity ==
The village is inhabited by Russians and others.
