= Kamyshenka, Amur Oblast =

Kamyshenka Камышенка
- Selo
- Location within Amur Oblast Location within Russia
- Coordinates: 50°05′N 129°20′E
- Country: Russia
- Region: Amur Oblast
- District: Zavitinsky District
- Time zone: UTC+9:00

Kamyshenka (Russian: Камышенка) is a rural locality (a selo) in Uspenovsky Selsoviet of Zavitinsky District, Amur Oblast, Russia. The population was 200 as of 2018. There are 3 streets.

== Geography ==
Kamyshenka is located 11 km west of Zavitinsk (the district's administrative centre) by road. Uspenovka is the nearest rural locality.
