= Pokrovka, Salavatsky District, Republic of Bashkortostan =

Pokrovka Покровка
- Village
- Location within Bashkortostan Location within Russia
- Coordinates: 55°13′N 58°06′E
- Country: Russia
- Region: Bashkortostan
- District: Salavatsky District
- Time zone: UTC+5:00

Pokrovka (Russian: Покровка) is a rural locality (a village) in Maloyazovsky Selsoviet, Salavatsky District, Bashkortostan, Russia. The population was 66 as of 2010. There is 1 street.

== Geography ==
Pokrovka is located 13 km northwest of Maloyaz (the district's administrative centre) by road. Cherepanovo is the nearest rural locality.
