= Pokrovka, Zabaykalsky Krai =

Pokrovka Покровка
- Selo
- Location within Zabaykalsky Krai Location within Russia
- Coordinates: 53°20′N 121°32′E
- Country: Russia
- Region: Zabaykalsky Krai
- District: Mogochinsky District
- Time zone: UTC+9:00

Pokrovka (Russian: Покровка) is a rural locality (a selo) in Mogochinsky District, Zabaykalsky Krai, Russia. Population: 9 (2021 census); 15 (2010 census); 12 (2002 census); There is 1 street in this selo.

== Geography ==
This rural locality is located 125 km from Mogocha (the district's administrative centre), 553 km from Chita (capital of Zabaykalsky Krai) and 5,577 km from Moscow. Ust-Strelka is the nearest rural locality.
