= Pokrovka, Baymaksky District, Republic of Bashkortostan =

Pokrovka Покровка
- Village
- Location within Bashkortostan Location within Russia
- Coordinates: 52°33′N 58°49′E
- Country: Russia
- Region: Bashkortostan
- District: Baymaksky District
- Time zone: UTC+5:00

Pokrovka (Russian: Покровка) is a rural locality (a village) in Zilairsky Selsoviet, Baymaksky District, Bashkortostan, Russia. The population was 167 as of 2010. There are 2 streets.

== Geography ==
Pokrovka is located 57 km east of Baymak (the district's administrative centre) by road. Kultaban is the nearest rural locality.
