= Pokrovka, Chernushinsky District, Perm Krai =

Pokrovka Покровка
- Village
- Location within Perm Krai Location within Russia
- Coordinates: 56°21′N 56°14′E
- Country: Russia
- Region: Perm Krai
- District: Chernushinsky District
- Time zone: UTC+5:00

Pokrovka (Russian: Покровка) is a rural locality (a village) in Chernushinsky District, Perm Krai, Russia. The population was 40 as of 2010. There is 1 street.

== Geography ==
Pokrovka is located 36 km southeast of Chernushka (the district's administrative centre) by road. Yesaul is the nearest rural locality.
