= Pokrovka, Fyodorovsky District, Republic of Bashkortostan =

Pokrovka Покровка
- Village
- Location within Bashkortostan Location within Russia
- Coordinates: 53°14′N 54°57′E
- Country: Russia
- Region: Bashkortostan
- District: Fyodorovsky District
- Time zone: UTC+5:00

Pokrovka (Russian: Покровка) is a rural locality (a village) and the administrative centre of Pokrovsky Selsoviet, Fyodorovsky District, Bashkortostan, Russia. The population was 195 as of 2010. There are 2 streets.

== Geography ==
Pokrovka is located 20km northwest of Fyodorovka (the district's administrative centre) by road. Ilyinovka is the nearest rural locality.
