= Pokrovka, Sterlibashevsky District, Republic of Bashkortostan =

Pokrovka Покровка
- Village
- Location within Bashkortostan Location within Russia
- Coordinates: 53°29′N 55°29′E
- Country: Russia
- Region: Bashkortostan
- District: Sterlibashevsky District
- Time zone: UTC+5:00

Pokrovka (Russian: Покровка) is a rural locality (a village) in Starokalkashevsky Selsoviet, Sterlibashevsky District, Bashkortostan, Russia. The population was 20 as of 2010. There is 1 street.

== Geography ==
Pokrovka is located 18 km northeast of Sterlibashevo (the district's administrative centre) by road. Baimovo is the nearest rural locality.
