= Pokrovka, Beryozovsky District, Perm Krai =

Pokrovka Покровка
- Village
- Location within Perm Krai Location within Russia
- Coordinates: 57°45′N 57°17′E
- Country: Russia
- Region: Perm Krai
- District: Beryozovsky District
- Time zone: UTC+5:00

Pokrovka (Russian: Покровка) is a rural locality (a village) in Pereborskoye Rural Settlement, Beryozovsky District, Perm Krai, Russia. The population was 163 as of 2010. There are 6 streets.

== Geography ==
It is located on the Shakva River.
