= Pokrovka, Kuyurgazinsky District, Republic of Bashkortostan =

Pokrovka Покровка
- Selo
- Location within Bashkortostan Location within Russia
- Coordinates: 52°40′N 55°54′E
- Country: Russia
- Region: Bashkortostan
- District: Kuyurgazinsky District
- Time zone: UTC+5:00

Pokrovka (Russian: Покровка) is a rural locality (a selo) in Bakhmutsky Selsoviet, Kuyurgazinsky District, Bashkortostan, Russia. The population was 169 as of 2010. There are 2 streets.

== Geography ==
Pokrovka is located 9 km southeast of Yermolayevo (the district's administrative centre) by road. Krasny Vostok is the nearest rural locality.
