= Pokrovka, Meleuzovsky District, Republic of Bashkortostan =

Pokrovka Покровка
- Village
- Location within Bashkortostan Location within Russia
- Coordinates: 53°18′N 55°46′E
- Country: Russia
- Region: Bashkortostan
- District: Meleuzovsky District
- Time zone: UTC+5:00

Pokrovka (Russian: Покровка) is a rural locality (a village) in Korneyevsky Selsoviet, Meleuzovsky District, Bashkortostan, Russia. The population was 128 as of 2010. There are 2 streets.

== Geography ==
Pokrovka is located 55 km north of Meleuz (the district's administrative centre) by road. Korneyevka is the nearest rural locality.
