= Pokrovka, Loktevsky District, Altai Krai =

Pokrovka Покровка
- Village
- Location within Altai Krai Location within Russia
- Coordinates: 51°11′N 81°26′E
- Country: Russia
- Region: Altai Krai
- District: Loktevsky District
- Time zone: UTC+7:00

Pokrovka (Russian: Покровка) is a rural locality (a selo) and the administrative center of Pokrovsky Selsoviet of Loktevsky District, Altai Krai, Russia. The population was 852 as of 2016. There are 12 streets.

== Geography ==
Pokrovka is located 47 km north of Gornyak (the district's administrative centre) by road. Georgiyevka is the nearest rural locality.
