= Pokrovka, Rodinsky District, Altai Krai =

Pokrovka Покровка
- Selo
- Location within Altai Krai Location within Russia
- Coordinates: 52°45′N 80°22′E
- Country: Russia
- Region: Altai Krai
- District: Rodinsky District
- Time zone: UTC+7:00

Pokrovka (Russian: Покровка) is a rural locality (a selo) and the administrative center of Pokrovsky Selsoviet, Rodinsky District, Altai Krai, Russia. The population was 806 as of 2013. There are 10 streets.

== Geography ==
Pokrovka is located 36 km northeast of Rodino (the district's administrative centre) by road. Gladen is the nearest rural locality.
