= Petropavlovka, Petropavlovsky District, Voronezh Oblast =

Rural locality in Voronezh Oblast, Russia

Coordinates: 50°04′59″N 40°52′58″E

Petropavlovka (Russian: Петропа́вловка) is a rural locality (a selo) and the administrative center of Petropavlovsky District of Voronezh Oblast, Russia. It has a population of 4,819 people.

== History ==
Population history
Year	Pop.	±% p.a.
1989	5,726	—
2002	5,546	−0.25%
2010	5,250	−0.68%
2021	4,819	−0.78%

The population of Petropavlovka slowly declined from 1989 to 2021, shrinking from 5726 to 4,819.
