= Petropavlovsky District, Voronezh Oblast =

Petropavlovsky District Петропавловский район (Russian)
- District
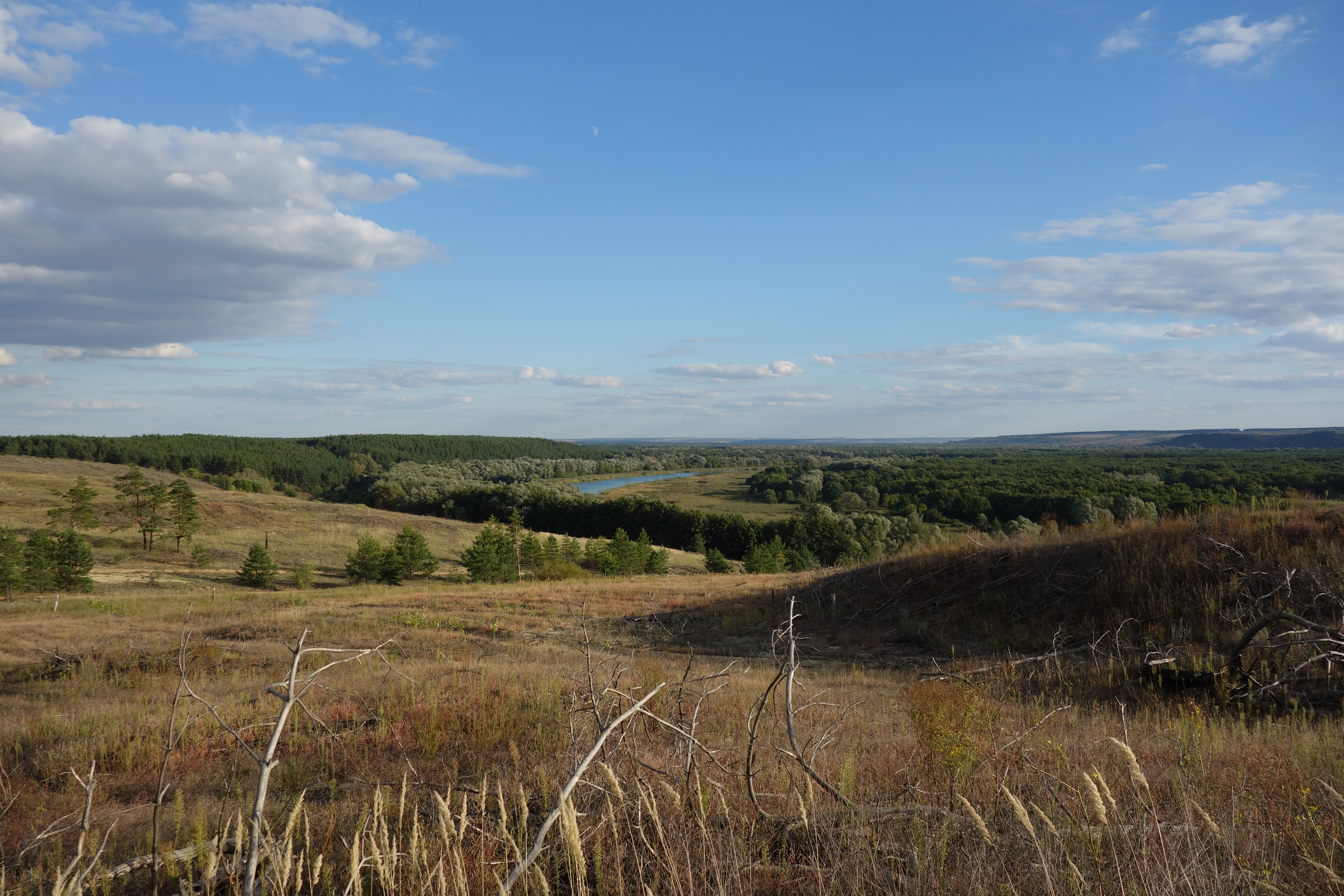
- Don River view, Petropavlovsky District

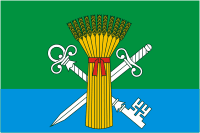
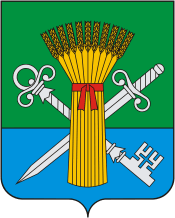
- Flag Coat of arms
- Location of Petropavlovsky District in Voronezh Oblast
- Coordinates: 50°05′49″N 40°52′40″E
- Country: Russia
- Federal subject: Voronezh Oblast
- Established: 1928
- Administrative center: Petropavlovka

Area
  - Total: 1,643.59 km^{2} (634.59 sq mi)

Population (2010 Census)
  - Total: 20,042
  - Density: 12.194/km^{2} (31.582/sq mi)
  - Urban: 0%
  - Rural: 100%

Administrative structure
  - Administrative divisions: 11 Rural settlements
  - Inhabited localities: 28 rural localities

Municipal structure
  - Municipally incorporated as: Petropavlovsky Municipal District
  - Municipal divisions: 0 urban settlements, 11 rural settlements
- Time zone: UTC+3 (MSK)
- OKTMO ID: 20637000

Petropavlovsky District (Russian: Петропа́вловский райо́н) is an administrative and municipal district (raion), one of the thirty-two in Voronezh Oblast, Russia. It is located in the southeast of the oblast. The area of the district is 1,643.59 square kilometers (634.59 sq mi). Its administrative center is the rural locality (a selo) of Petropavlovka. Population: 16,573 (2021 census); 20,042 (2010 census); 23,414 (2002 census); 25,128 (1989 Soviet census). The population of Petropavlovka accounts for 29.0% of the district's total population.
