= Zavyalovo, Altai Krai =

Rural locality in Russia

Zavyalovo Завьялово
- Selo
- Interactive map of Zavyalovo
- Location of Zavyalovo Zavyalovo (Altai Krai)
- Coordinates: 52°50′25″N 80°55′20″E
- Country: Russia
- Federal subject: Altai Krai
- Administrative district: Zavyalovsky District
- SelsovietSelsoviet: Zavyalovsky Selsoviet
- Founded: 1782

Population (2010 Census)
  - Total: 6,928
  - Estimate (2021): 6,258 (−9.7%)

Administrative status
  - Capital of: Zavyalovsky District, Zavyalovsky Selsoviet

Municipal status
  - Municipal district: Zavyalovsky Municipal District
  - Rural settlement: Zavyalovsky Selsoviet Rural Settlement
  - Capital of: Zavyalovsky Municipal District, Zavyalovsky Selsoviet Rural Settlement
- Time zone: UTC+7 (MSK+4)
- Postal code: 658620
- OKTMO ID: 01611434101

Zavyalovo (Russian: Завьялово) is a rural locality (a selo) and the administrative center of Zavyalovsky District of Altai Krai, Russia. Its population is 6,928 (2010 census); 7,430 (2002 census); 6,830 (1989 Soviet census).
