= Bayevo, Altai Krai =

Rural locality in Altai Krai, Russia

Bayevo Баево
- Selo
- Interactive map of Bayevo
- Location of Bayevo Bayevo (Altai Krai)
- Coordinates: 53°16′11″N 80°46′44″E
- Country: Russia
- Federal subject: Altai Krai
- Administrative district: Bayevsky District
- SelsovietSelsoviet: Bayevsky Selsoviet
- Elevation: 121 m (397 ft)

Population (2010 Census)
  - Total: 4,707
  - Estimate (2025): 3,697 (−21.5%)

Administrative status
  - Capital of: Bayevsky District, Bayevsky Selsoviet

Municipal status
  - Municipal district: Bayevsky Municipal District
  - Rural settlement: Bayevsky Selsoviet Rural Settlement
  - Capital of: Bayevsky Municipal District, Bayevsky Selsoviet Rural Settlement
- Time zone: UTC+7 (MSK+4)
- Postal code: 658510
- OKTMO ID: 01603407101

Bayevo (Russian: Баево) is a rural locality (a selo) and the administrative center of Bayevsky District of Altai Krai, Russia. Population: 4,707 (2010 census); 5,175 (2002 census); 5,556 (1989 Soviet census).. The population estimate as of 2016 was 4,188

== Geography ==
The village is located by the Kulunda River on the Kulunda Plain, 230 km from Barnaul and 37 km from the nearest railway station (Gilyovka).

== Ethnicity ==
The village is inhabited by Russians, Germans, Ukrainians, Kazakhs and others.
