= Bayevsky District =

Bayevsky District Баевский район (Russian)
- District
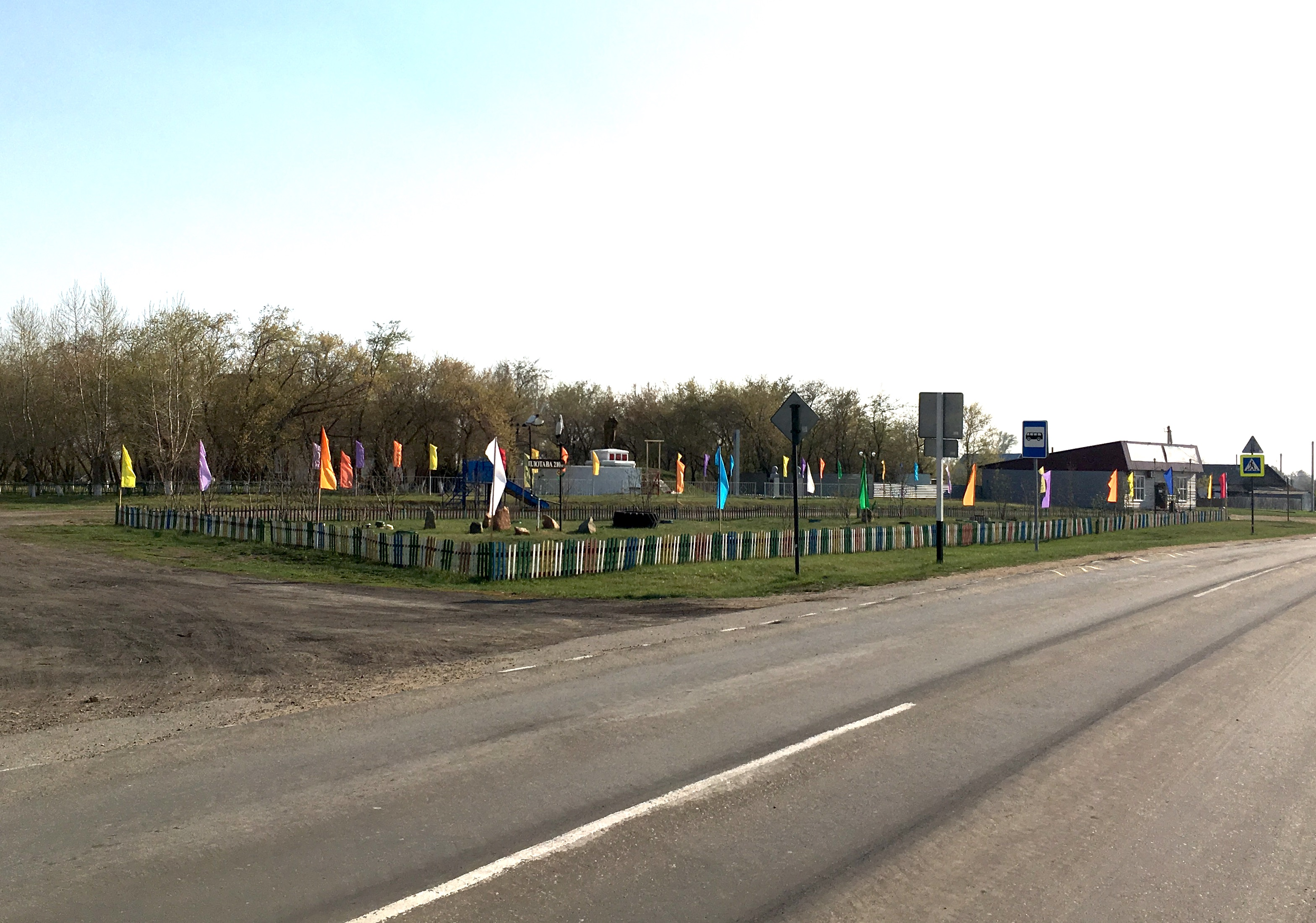

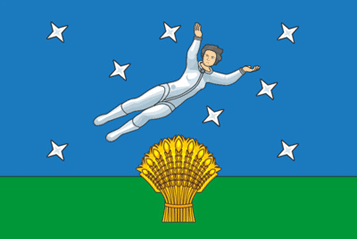
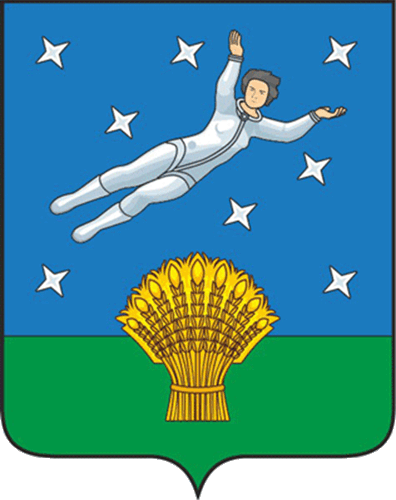
- Flag Coat of arms
- Location of Bayevsky District in Altai Krai
- Coordinates: 53°16′N 80°46′E
- Country: Russia
- Federal subject: Altai Krai
- Administrative center: Bayevo

Area
  - Total: 2,740 km^{2} (1,060 sq mi)

Population (2010 Census)
  - Total: 10,979
  - Density: 4.01/km^{2} (10.4/sq mi)
  - Urban: 0%
  - Rural: 100%

Administrative structure
  - Administrative divisions: 8 Selsoviets
  - Inhabited localities: 15 rural localities

Municipal structure
  - Municipally incorporated as: Bayevsky Municipal District
  - Municipal divisions: 0 urban settlements, 8 rural settlements
- Time zone: UTC+7 (MSK+4)
- OKTMO ID: 01603000
- Website: http://baevo-altai.ru

Bayevsky District (Russian: Ба́евский райо́н) is an administrative and municipal district (raion), one of the fifty-nine in Altai Krai, Russia. It is located in the northwest of the krai. The area of the district is 2,740 square kilometers (1,060 sq mi). Its administrative center is the rural locality (a selo) of Bayevo. Population: 10,979 (2010 census); 13,601 (2002 census); 14,963 (1989 Soviet census). The population of Bayevo accounts for 42.9% of the district's total population.

== Geography ==
Bayevsky District is located in the northwest of Altai Krai. The area is on a rolling steppe landscape of the Ob Plateau. The Ob River is 40 km from the district, to the northwest. In the district, there are over 130 lakes and reservoirs, as well as the Kulunda Main Canal and part of Mostovoye lake. The soil is black earth, and there are salt marshes. The north has birch groves, the east of the district has mixed-forests, and the west is steppe. Bayevsky District is about 220 km southwest of the city of Novosibirsk, 170 km west of the regional city of Barnaul, and 2,750 km east of Moscow. The area measures 50 km (north-south), and 65 km (west-east); total area is 2,740 km² (about 2% of Altai Krai). The administrative center is the town of Bayevo, in the north-center of the district at a junction of the main north–south and west–east roads.

The district is bordered on the north by Pankrushikhinsky District and Kamensky District, on the east by Tyumentsevsky District, on the south by Zavyalovsky District, and on the west by Suetsky District.
