= Zavyalovsky District, Altai Krai =

Zavyalovsky District Завьяловский район (Russian)
- District
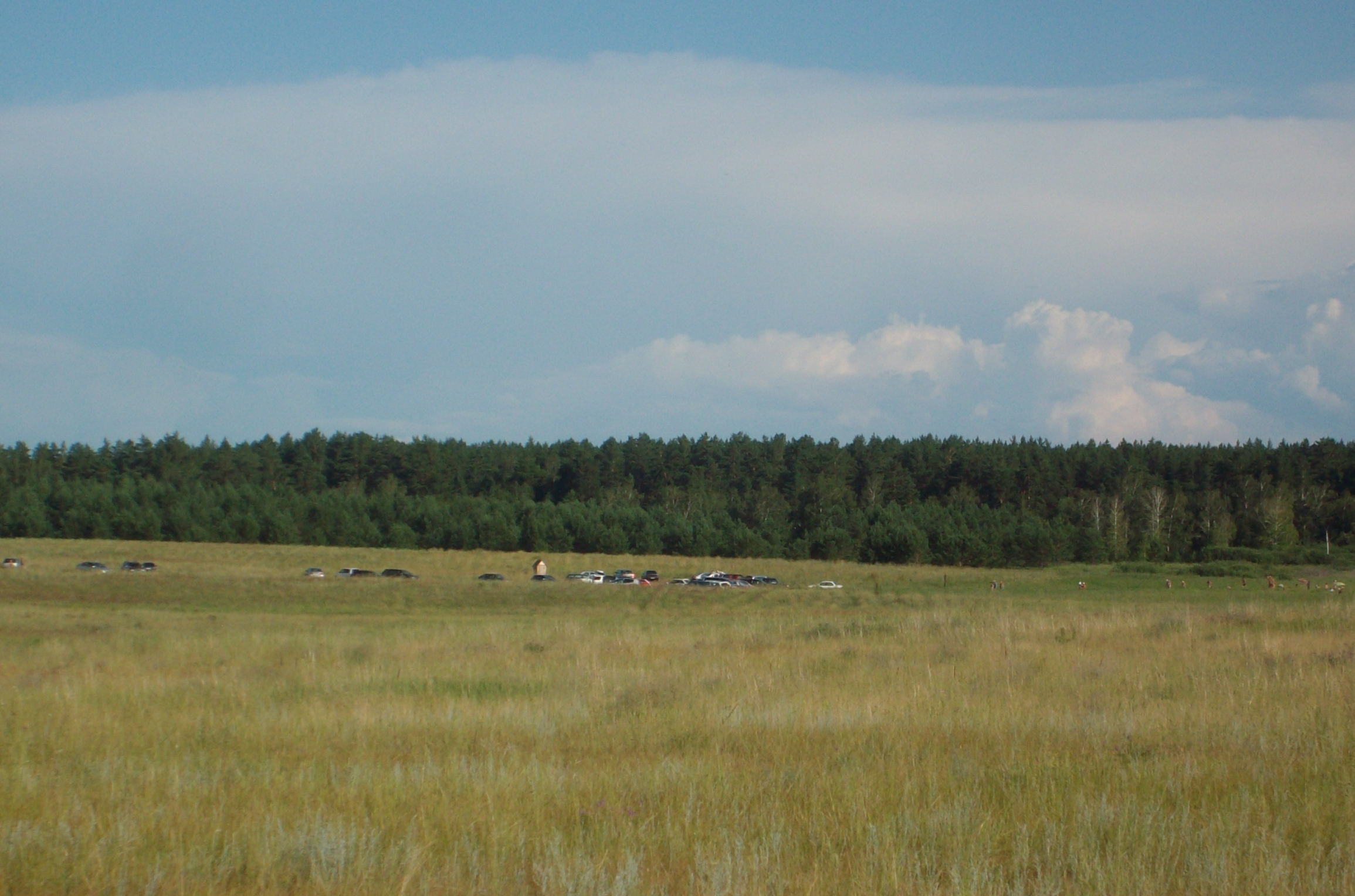
- A salt lake near the selo of Svetloye in Zavyalovsky District

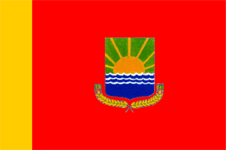
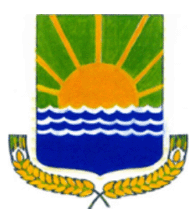
- Flag Coat of arms
- Location of Zavyalovsky District in Altai Krai
- Coordinates: 52°48′N 80°54′E
- Country: Russia
- Federal subject: Altai Krai
- Established: 1925
- Administrative center: Zavyalovo

Area
  - Total: 2,224 km^{2} (859 sq mi)

Population (2010 Census)
  - Total: 19,305
  - Density: 8.680/km^{2} (22.48/sq mi)
  - Urban: 0%
  - Rural: 100%

Administrative structure
  - Administrative divisions: 12 selsoviet
  - Inhabited localities: 18 rural localities

Municipal structure
  - Municipally incorporated as: Zavyalovsky Municipal District
  - Municipal divisions: 0 urban settlements, 12 rural settlements
- Time zone: UTC+7 (MSK+4)
- OKTMO ID: 01611000
- Website: http://www.zavyalovo-altai.ru/

Zavyalovsky District (Russian: Завья́ловский райо́н) is an administrative and municipal district (raion), one of the fifty-nine in Altai Krai, Russia. It is located in the northwestern central part of the krai. The area of the district is 2,224 square kilometers (859 sq mi). Its administrative center is the rural locality (a selo) of Zavyalovo. Population: 19,305 (2010 census); 22,389 (2002 census); 21,695 (1989 Soviet census). The population of Zavyalovo accounts for 35.9% of the district's total population.

== Geography ==
The district lies in the transition zone between the Ob Plateau and the Kulunda Plain. Part of Mostovoye lake is located in the district.
