= Nuclear proliferation =

Spread of nuclear weapons

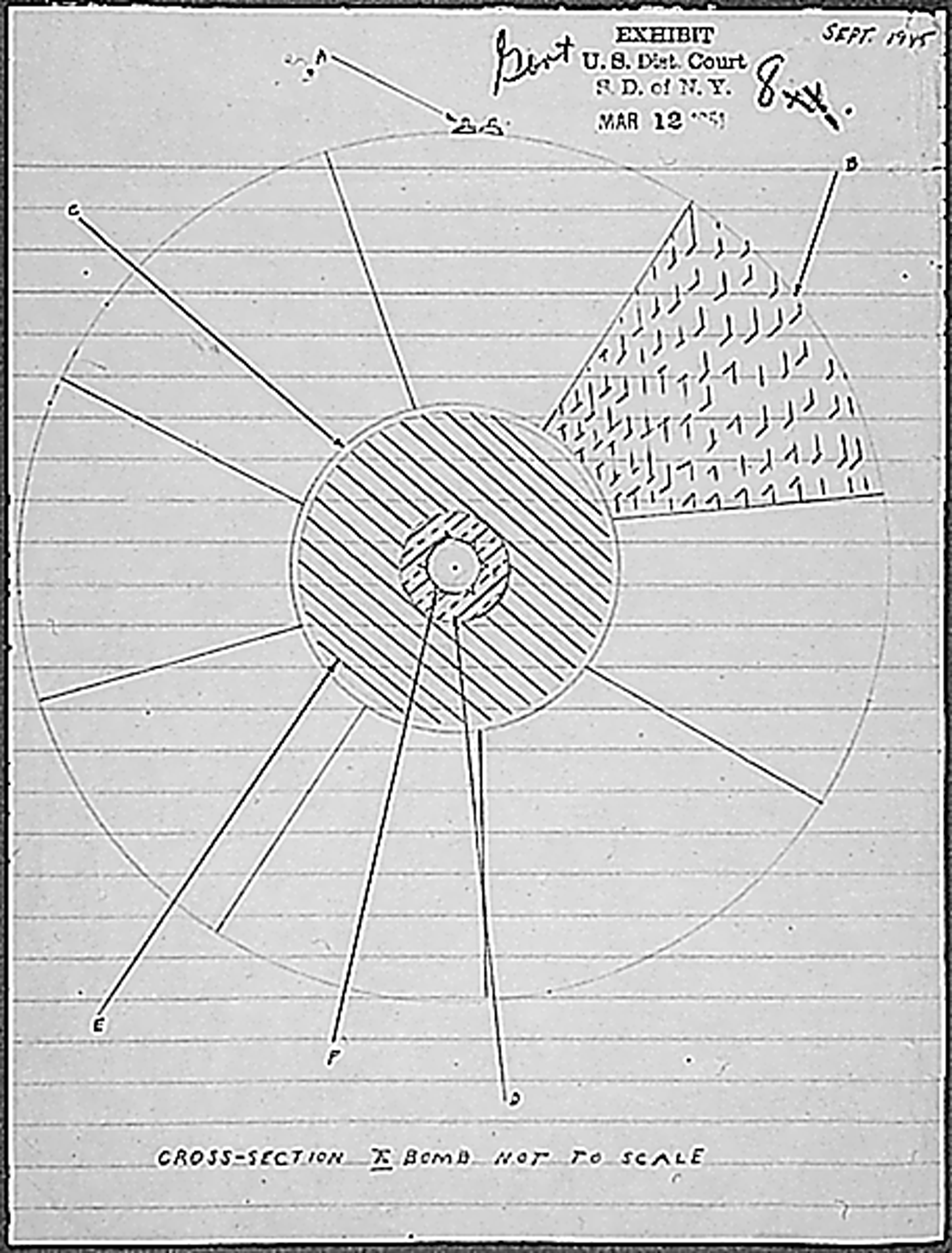
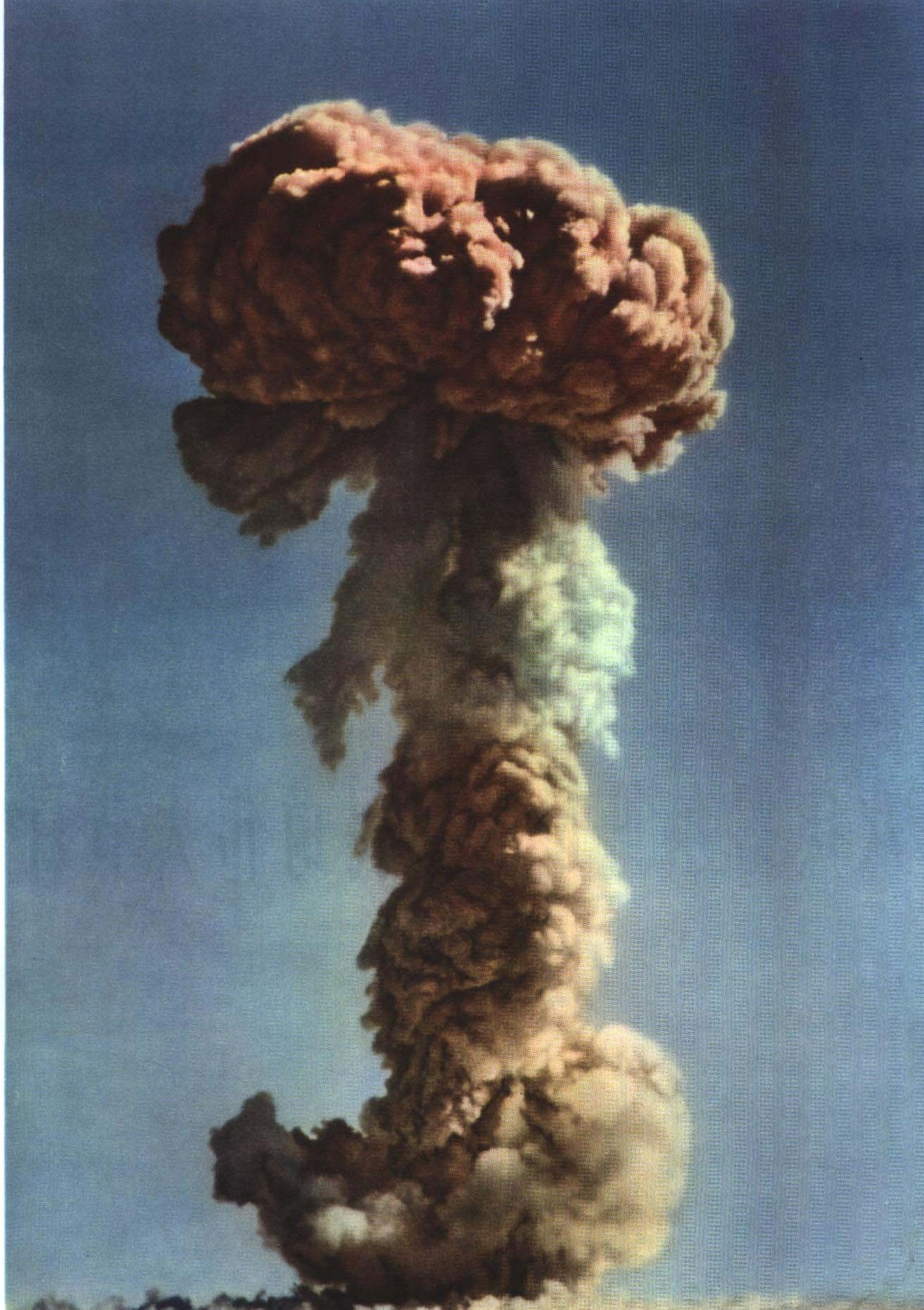
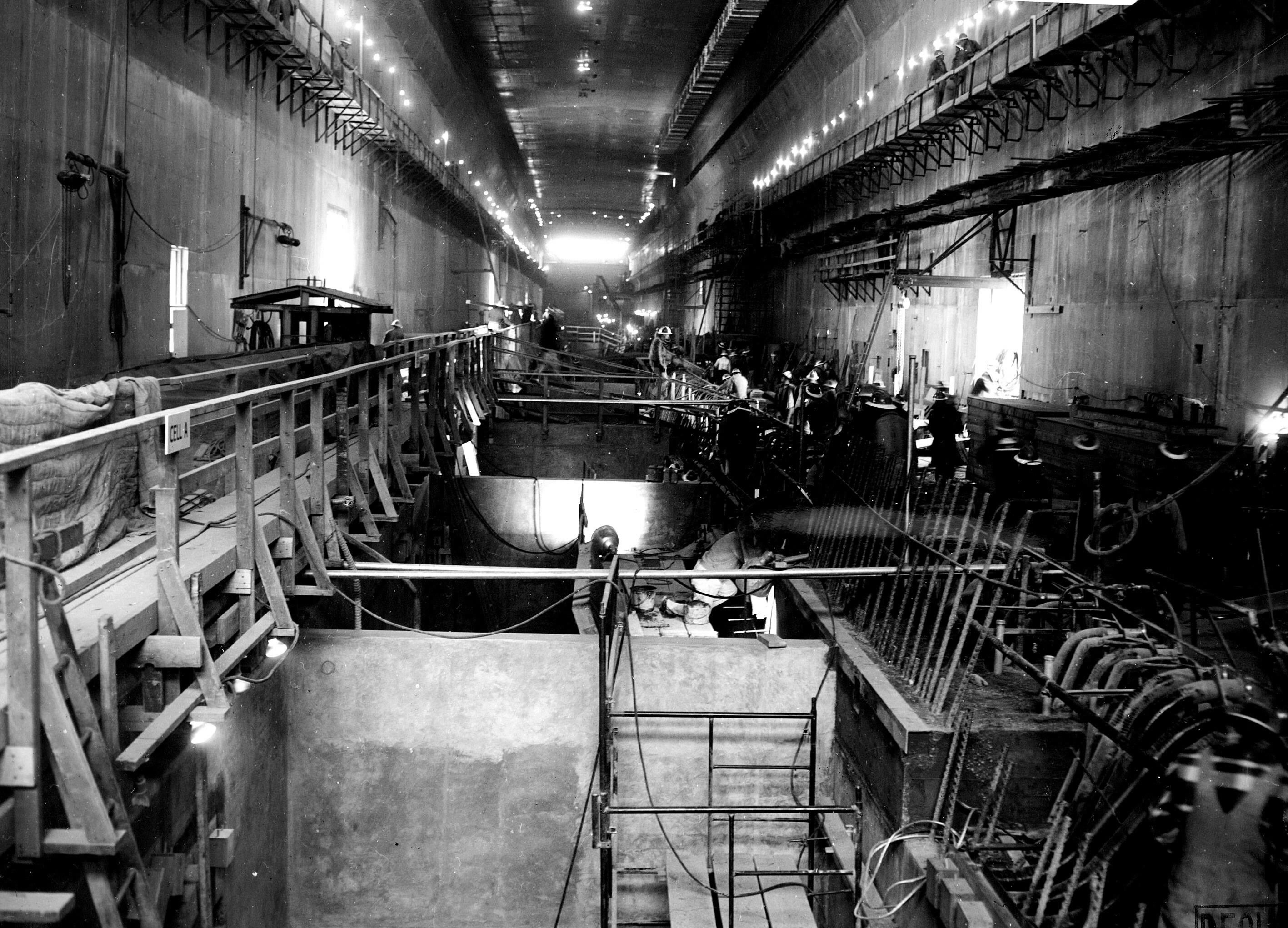
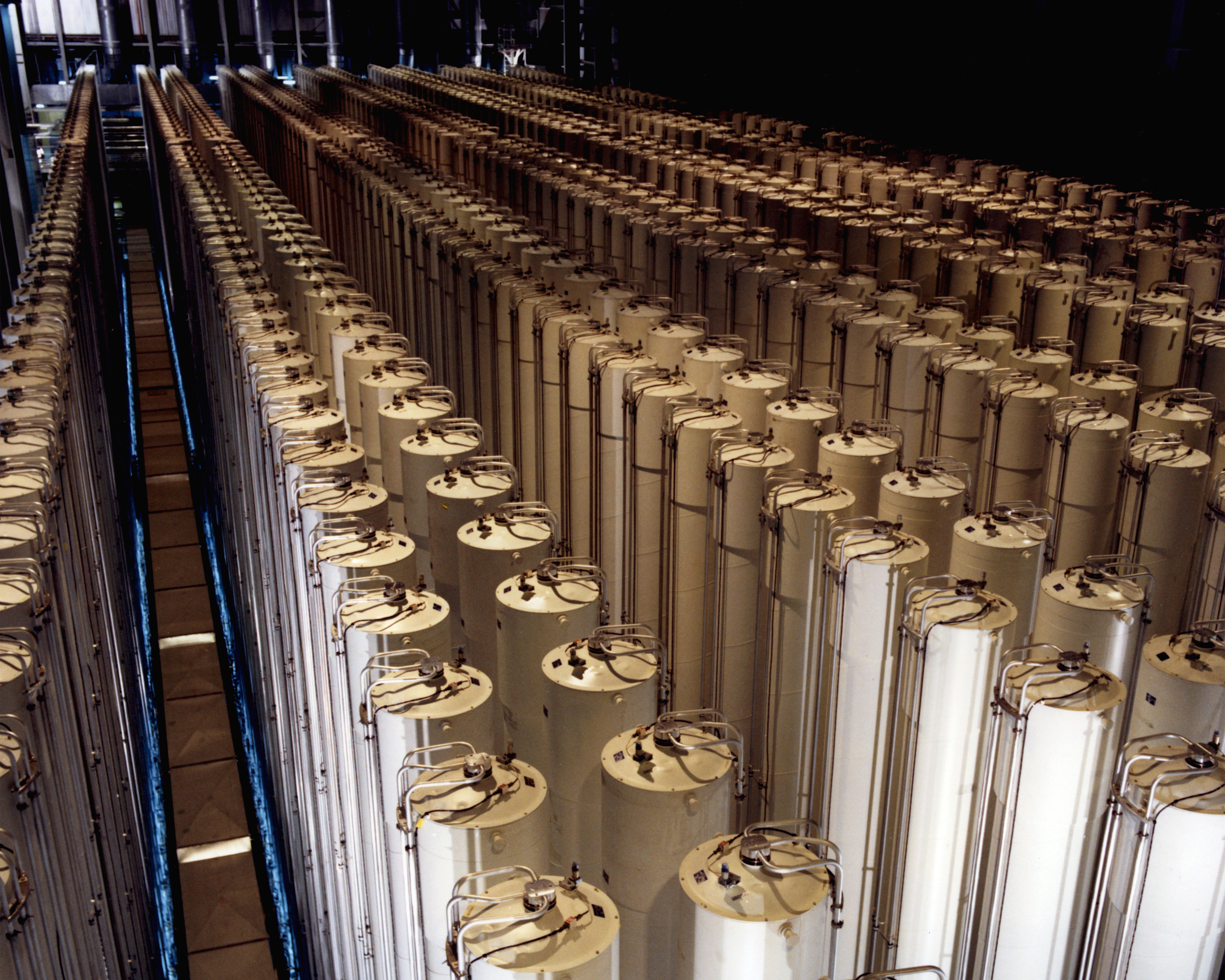
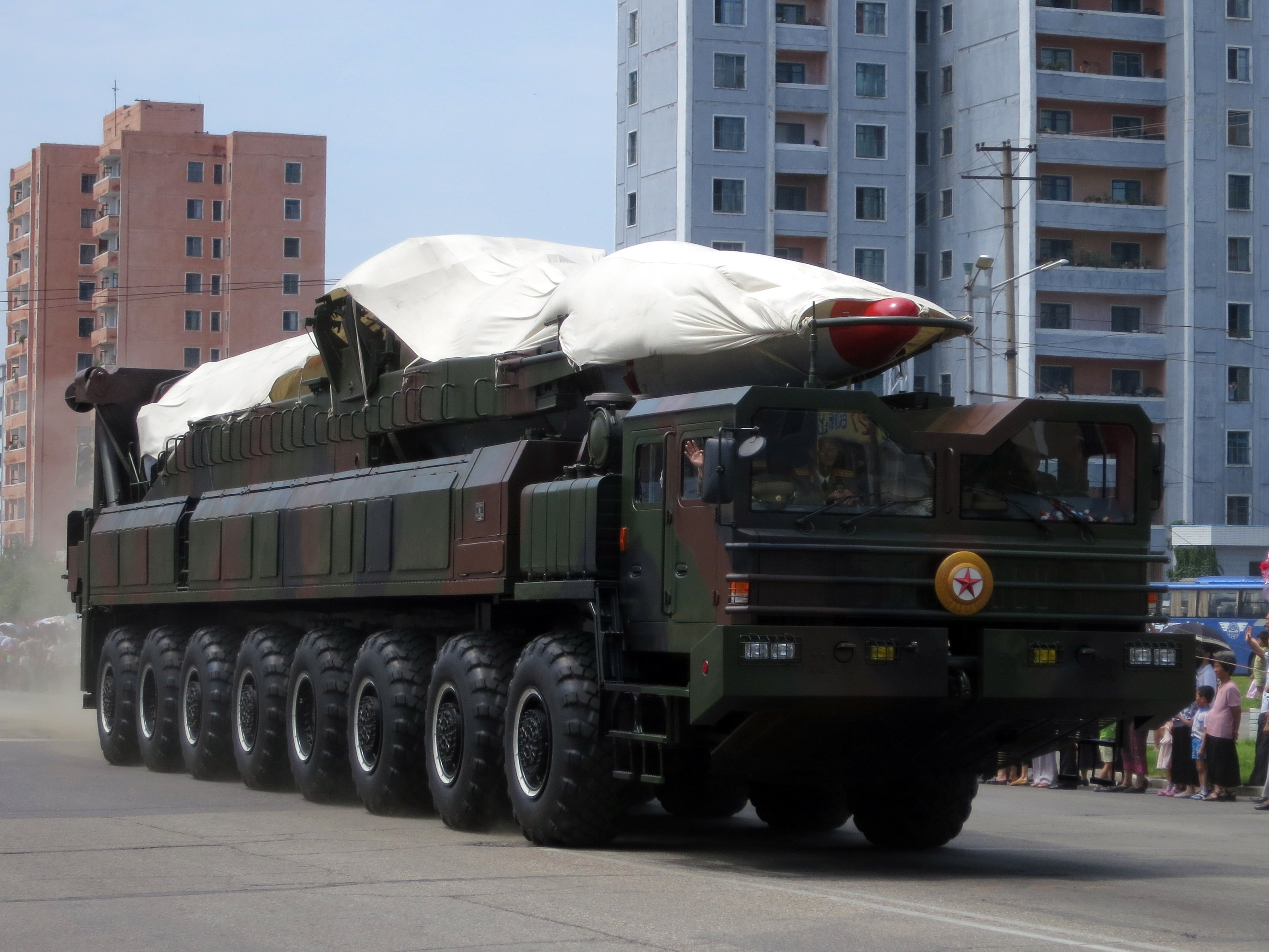
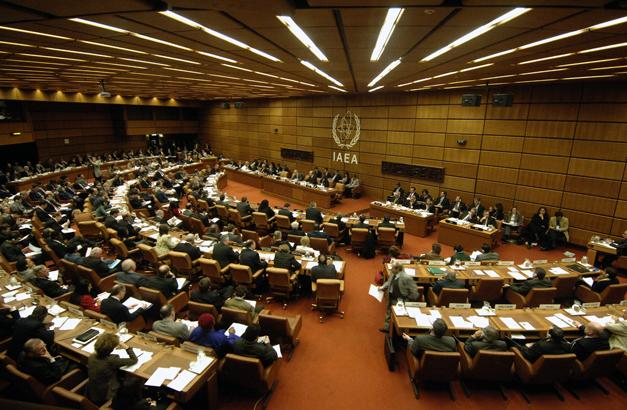
From top, left to right
1. Atomic spy sketch of an implosion-type nuclear weapon, passed to the Soviet Union
2. Project 596, China's first nuclear test, becoming the first nuclear power in Asia
3. Hanford Site; chemical separation or reprocessing produces plutonium, a major proliferation risk
4. Gas centrifuges, the prevailing method of uranium enrichment, another major proliferation risk
5. Nuclear-capable ballistic missile on parade in North Korea, the most recent country to acquire nuclear weapons
6. Meeting of the International Atomic Energy Agency, charged with proliferation control

Nuclear proliferation is the spread of nuclear weapons to additional countries, particularly those not recognized as nuclear-weapon states by the Treaty on the Non-Proliferation of Nuclear Weapons, commonly known as the Non-Proliferation Treaty or NPT. Nuclear proliferation occurs through the spread of fissile material, and the technology and capabilities needed to produce it and to design and manufacture nuclear weapons. In a modern context, it also includes the spread of nuclear weapons to non-state actors. Proliferation has been opposed by many nations with and without nuclear weapons, as governments fear that more countries with nuclear weapons will increase the possibility of nuclear warfare (including the so-called countervalue targeting of civilians), de-stabilize international relations, or infringe upon the principle of state sovereignty. Conversely, supporters of deterrence theory argue that controlled proliferation decreases conflict rates via nuclear peace.

Nuclear weapons were initially researched during World War II, jointly by the United States, United Kingdom and Canada, and separately by Germany, Japan, the Soviet Union, and France. The United States was the first and is the only country to have used a nuclear weapon in war, when it used two bombs against Japan in August 1945. After surrendering, Germany and Japan ceased to be involved in any nuclear weapon research. A nuclear arms race followed, with further countries developing and testing nuclear weapons. The US primarily competed with the Soviet Union, which carried out their first test in 1949. Seven other countries developed nuclear weapons during the Cold War. The UK and France, both NATO members, developed fission and fusion weapons throughout the 1950s, and 1960s, respectively. China developed both against the backdrop of the Sino-Soviet split.

Five countries besides the five recognized Nuclear Weapon States have acquired, or are presumed to have acquired, nuclear weapons: Israel, South Africa, India, Pakistan, and North Korea. While South Africa dismantled its program and acceded, the other four states are not members of the NPT. One critique of the NPT is that the treaty is discriminatory in the sense that only those countries that tested nuclear weapons before 1968 are recognized as nuclear weapon states while all other states are treated as non-nuclear-weapon states who can only join the treaty if they forswear nuclear weapons.

Many other states pursued a nuclear weapons program without attaining weapons. These include Yugoslavia, South Korea, Libya, Brazil, Iraq, Iran, and Syria. Some states, such as modern Iran and Japan, are suggested to maintain nuclear latency, the capacity to rapidly develop nuclear weapons on demand. Proliferation is tied to the development of civilian nuclear power, as fuel reprocessing and uranium enrichment facilities have dual use for producing both civilian and weapons-grade fissile material. It is also tied to the proliferation of nuclear weapons delivery systems, especially ballistic missiles.

== History of nuclear non-proliferation efforts ==
Early efforts to prevent nuclear proliferation involved intense government secrecy, the wartime acquisition of known uranium stores (the Combined Development Trust), and at times even outright sabotage—such as the bombing of a heavy-water facility in Norway thought to be used for a German nuclear program. These efforts began immediately after the discovery of nuclear fission and its military potential. None of these efforts were explicitly public, because the weapon developments themselves were kept secret until the bombing of Hiroshima.

Earnest international efforts to promote nuclear non-proliferation began soon after World War II, when the Truman Administration proposed the Baruch Plan of 1946, named after Bernard Baruch, America's first representative to the United Nations Atomic Energy Commission (UNAEC). The Baruch Plan, which drew heavily from the Acheson–Lilienthal Report of 1946, proposed the verifiable dismantlement and destruction of the U.S. nuclear arsenal (which, at that time, was the only nuclear arsenal in the world) after all governments had cooperated successfully to accomplish two things: (1) the establishment of an "international atomic development authority," which would actually own and control all military-applicable nuclear materials and activities, and (2) the creation of a system of automatic sanctions, which not even the U.N. Security Council could veto, and which would proportionately punish states attempting to acquire the capability to make nuclear weapons or fissile material.

Baruch's plea for the destruction of nuclear weapons invoked basic moral and religious intuitions. In one part of his address to the UN, Baruch said, "Behind the black portent of the new atomic age lies a hope which, seized upon with faith, can work out our salvation. If we fail, then we have damned every man to be the slave of Fear. Let us not deceive ourselves. We must elect World Peace or World Destruction.... We must answer the world's longing for peace and security." With this remark, Baruch helped launch the field of nuclear ethics, to which many policy experts and scholars have contributed.

Although the Baruch Plan enjoyed wide international support, it failed to emerge from the UNAEC because the Soviet Union planned to veto it in the Security Council. Still, it remained official American policy until 1953, when President Eisenhower made his "Atoms for Peace" proposal before the U.N. General Assembly. Eisenhower's proposal led eventually to the creation of the International Atomic Energy Agency (IAEA) in 1957. Under the "Atoms for Peace" program thousands of scientists from around the world were educated in nuclear science and then dispatched home, where many later pursued secret weapons programs in their home country.

Efforts to conclude an international agreement to limit the spread of nuclear weapons did not begin until the early 1960s, after four nations (the United States, the Soviet Union, the United Kingdom and France) had acquired nuclear weapons (see List of states with nuclear weapons for more information). Although these efforts stalled in the early 1960s, they renewed once again in 1964, after China detonated a nuclear weapon. In 1968, governments represented at the Eighteen Nation Disarmament Committee (ENDC) finished negotiations on the text of the NPT. In June 1968, the U.N. General Assembly endorsed the NPT with General Assembly Resolution 2373 (XXII), and in July 1968, the NPT opened for signature in Washington, D.C., London and Moscow. The NPT entered into force in March 1970.

Since the mid-1970s, the primary focus of non-proliferation efforts has been to maintain, and even increase, international control over the fissile material and specialized technologies necessary to build such devices because these are the most difficult and expensive parts of a nuclear weapons program. The main materials whose generation and distribution are controlled are highly enriched uranium and plutonium. Other than the acquisition of these special materials, the scientific and technical means for weapons construction to develop rudimentary, but working, nuclear explosive devices are considered to be within the reach of industrialized nations.

Since its founding by the United Nations in 1957, the IAEA has promoted two, sometimes contradictory, missions: on the one hand, the Agency seeks to promote and spread internationally the use of civilian nuclear energy; on the other hand, it seeks to prevent, or at least detect, the diversion of civilian nuclear energy to nuclear weapons, nuclear explosive devices or purposes unknown. The IAEA now operates a safeguards system as specified under Article III of the Nuclear Non-Proliferation Treaty (NPT) of 1968, which aims to ensure that civil stocks of uranium and plutonium, as well as facilities and technologies associated with these nuclear materials, are used only for peaceful purposes and do not contribute in any way to proliferation or nuclear weapons programs. It is often argued that the proliferation of nuclear weapons to many other states has been prevented by the extension of assurances and mutual defence treaties to these states by nuclear powers, but other factors, such as national prestige, or specific historical experiences, also play a part in hastening or stopping nuclear proliferation.

== Dual-use technology ==
Dual-use technology refers to the possibility of military use of civilian nuclear power technology. Many technologies and materials associated with the creation of a nuclear power program have a dual-use capability, in that several stages of the nuclear fuel cycle allow diversion of nuclear materials for nuclear weapons. When this happens a nuclear power program can become a route leading to the atomic bomb or a public annex to a secret bomb program. The crisis over Iran's nuclear activities is a case in point.

Many UN and US agencies warn that building more nuclear reactors unavoidably increases nuclear proliferation risks. A fundamental goal for American and global security is to minimize the proliferation risks associated with the expansion of nuclear power. If this development is "poorly managed or efforts to contain risks are unsuccessful, the nuclear future will be dangerous". For nuclear power programs to be developed and managed safely and securely, it is important that countries have domestic "good governance" characteristics that will encourage proper nuclear operations and management:

These characteristics include low degrees of corruption (to avoid officials selling materials and technology for their own personal gain as occurred with the A.Q. Khan smuggling network in Pakistan), high degrees of political stability (defined by the World Bank as "likelihood that the government will be destabilized or overthrown by unconstitutional or violent means, including politically-motivated violence and terrorism"), high governmental effectiveness scores (a World Bank aggregate measure of "the quality of the civil service and the degree of its independence from political pressures [and] the quality of policy formulation and implementation"), and a strong degree of regulatory competence.

== International cooperation ==
=== Treaty on the Non-Proliferation of Nuclear Weapons ===
At present, 189 countries are States Parties to the Treaty on the Nonproliferation of Nuclear Weapons, more commonly known as the Nuclear Non-Proliferation Treaty or NPT. These include the five Nuclear Weapons States (NWS) recognized by the NPT: the People's Republic of China, France, Russian Federation, the UK, and the United States.

Notable non-signatories to the NPT are Israel, Pakistan, and India (the latter two have since tested nuclear weapons, while Israel is considered by most to be an unacknowledged nuclear weapons state). North Korea was once a signatory but withdrew in January 2003. The legality of North Korea's withdrawal is debatable but on 9 October 2006 North Korea said it tested a nuclear device, for which it was sanctioned by the UN Security Council.

=== International Atomic Energy Agency ===
The IAEA was established on 29 July 1957 to help nations develop nuclear energy for peaceful purposes. Allied to this role is the administration of safeguards arrangements to provide assurance to the international community that individual countries are honoring their commitments under the treaty. Though established under its own international treaty, the IAEA reports to both the United Nations General Assembly and the Security Council.

The IAEA regularly inspects civil nuclear facilities to verify the accuracy of documentation supplied to it. The agency checks inventories, and samples and analyzes materials. Safeguards are designed to deter a diversion of nuclear material by increasing the risk of early detection. They are complemented by controls on the export of sensitive technology from countries such as the UK and the United States through voluntary bodies such as the Nuclear Suppliers Group. The main concern of the IAEA is that uranium not be enriched beyond what is necessary for commercial civil plants, and that plutonium which is produced by nuclear reactors not be refined into a form that would be suitable for bomb production.

=== Scope of safeguards ===
Traditional safeguards are arrangements to account for and control the use of nuclear materials. This verification is a key element in the international system which ensures that uranium in particular is used only for peaceful purposes.

Parties to the NPT agree to accept technical safeguard measures applied by the IAEA. These require that operators of nuclear facilities maintain and declare detailed accounting records of all movements and transactions involving nuclear material. Over 550 facilities and several hundred other locations are subject to regular inspection, and their records and the nuclear material being audited. Inspections by the IAEA are complemented by other measures such as surveillance cameras and instrumentation.

The inspections act as an alert system providing a warning of the possible diversion of nuclear material from peaceful activities. The system relies on;

1. Material Accountancy – tracking all inward and outward transfers and the flow of materials in any nuclear facility. This includes sampling and analysis of nuclear material, on-site inspections, and review and verification of operating records.
2. Physical Security – restricting access to nuclear materials at the site.
3. Containment and Surveillance – use of seals, automatic cameras and other instruments to detect unreported movement or tampering with nuclear materials, as well as spot checks on-site.

All NPT non-weapons states must accept these full-scope safeguards. In the five weapons states plus the non-NPT states (India, Pakistan and Israel), facility-specific safeguards apply. IAEA inspectors regularly visit these facilities to verify completeness and accuracy of records.

The terms of the NPT cannot be enforced by the IAEA itself, nor can nations be forced to sign the treaty. In reality, as shown in Iraq and North Korea, safeguards can be backed up by diplomatic, political and economic measures.

While traditional safeguards easily verified the correctness of formal declarations by suspect states, in the 1990s attention turned to what might not have been declared. While accepting safeguards at declared facilities, Iraq had set up elaborate equipment elsewhere in an attempt to enrich uranium to weapons-grade. North Korea attempted to use research reactors (not commercial electricity-generating reactors) and a nuclear reprocessing plant to produce some weapons-grade plutonium.

The weakness of the NPT regime lay in the fact that no obvious diversion of material was involved. The uranium used as fuel probably came from indigenous sources, and the nuclear facilities were built by the countries themselves without being declared or placed under safeguards. Iraq, as an NPT party, was obliged to declare all facilities but did not do so. Nevertheless, the activities were detected and brought under control using international diplomacy. In Iraq, a military defeat assisted this process.

In North Korea, the activities concerned took place before the conclusion of its NPT safeguards agreement. With North Korea, the promised provision of commercial power reactors appeared to resolve the situation for a time, but it later withdrew from the NPT and declared it had nuclear weapons.

=== Additional Protocol ===
In 1993 a program was initiated to strengthen and extend the classical safeguards system, and a model protocol was agreed by the IAEA Board of Governors 1997. The measures boosted the IAEA's ability to detect undeclared nuclear activities, including those with no connection to the civil fuel cycle.

Innovations were of two kinds. Some could be implemented on the basis of IAEA's existing legal authority through safeguards agreements and inspections. Others required further legal authority to be conferred through an Additional Protocol. This must be agreed by each non-weapons state with IAEA, as a supplement to any existing comprehensive safeguards agreement. Weapons states have agreed to accept the principles of the model additional protocol.

Key elements of the model Additional Protocol:

- The IAEA is to be given considerably more information on nuclear and nuclear-related activities, including R & D, production of uranium and thorium (regardless of whether it is traded), and nuclear-related imports and exports.
- IAEA inspectors will have greater rights of access. This will include any suspect location, it can be at short notice (e.g., two hours), and the IAEA can deploy environmental sampling and remote monitoring techniques to detect illicit activities.
- States must streamline administrative procedures so that IAEA inspectors get automatic visa renewal and can communicate more readily with IAEA headquarters.
- Further evolution of safeguards is towards evaluation of each state, taking account of its particular situation and the kind of nuclear materials it has. This will involve greater judgement on the part of IAEA and the development of effective methodologies which reassure NPT States.

As of 3 July 2015, 146 countries have signed the Additional Protocols and 126 have brought them into force. The IAEA is also applying the measures of the Additional Protocol in Taiwan. Under the Joint Comprehensive Plan of Action, Iran has agreed to implement its protocol provisionally. Among the leading countries that have not signed the Additional Protocol are Egypt, which says it will not sign until Israel accepts comprehensive IAEA safeguards, and Brazil, which opposes making the protocol a requirement for international cooperation on enrichment and reprocessing, but has not ruled out signing.

=== Limitations of safeguards ===
The greatest risk from nuclear weapons proliferation comes from countries that have not joined the NPT and which have significant unsafeguarded nuclear activities; India, Pakistan, and Israel fall within this category. While safeguards apply to some of their activities, others remain beyond scrutiny.

A further concern is that countries may develop various sensitive nuclear fuel cycle facilities and research reactors under full safeguards and then subsequently opt out of the NPT. Bilateral agreements, such as insisted upon by Australia and Canada for sale of uranium, address this by including fallback provisions, but many countries are outside the scope of these agreements. If a nuclear-capable country does leave the NPT, it is likely to be reported by the IAEA to the United Nations Security Council, just as if it were in breach of its safeguards agreement. Trade sanctions would then be likely.

IAEA safeguards can help ensure that uranium supplied as nuclear fuel and other nuclear supplies do not contribute to nuclear weapons proliferation. In fact, the worldwide application of those safeguards and the substantial world trade in uranium for nuclear electricity make the proliferation of nuclear weapons much less likely.

The Additional Protocol, once it is widely in force, will provide credible assurance that there are no undeclared nuclear materials or activities in the states concerned. This will be a major step forward in preventing nuclear proliferation.

=== Other developments ===
The Nuclear Suppliers Group communicated its guidelines, essentially a set of export rules, to the IAEA in 1978. These were to ensure that transfers of nuclear material or equipment would not be diverted to unsafeguarded nuclear fuel cycle or nuclear explosive activities, and formal government assurances to this effect were required from recipients. The Guidelines also recognised the need for physical protection measures in the transfer of sensitive facilities, technology and weapons-usable materials, and strengthened retransfer provisions. The group began with seven members—the United States, the former USSR, the United Kingdom, France, Germany, Canada and Japan—but now includes 46 countries including all five nuclear weapons states.

The International Framework for Nuclear Energy Cooperation is an international project involving 25 partner countries, 28 observer and candidate partner countries, and the International Atomic Energy Agency, the Generation IV International Forum, and the European Commission. Its goal is to "[..] provide competitive, commercially-based services as an alternative to a state's development of costly, proliferation-sensitive facilities, and address other issues associated with the safe and secure management of used fuel and radioactive waste."

According to Kenneth D. Bergeron's Tritium on Ice: The Dangerous New Alliance of Nuclear Weapons and Nuclear Power, tritium is not classified as a "special nuclear material" but rather as a by-product. It is seen as an important litmus test on the seriousness of the United States' intention to nuclear disarm. This radioactive, super-heavy, hydrogen isotope is used to boost the efficiency of fissile materials in nuclear weapons. The United States resumed tritium production in 2003 for the first time in 15 years. This could indicate that there is a potential nuclear arms stockpile replacement since the isotope naturally decays.

In May 1995, NPT parties reaffirmed their commitment to a Fissile Materials Cut-off Treaty to prohibit the production of any further fissile material for weapons. This aims to complement the Comprehensive Nuclear-Test-Ban Treaty of 1996 (not entered into force as of June 2020) and to codify commitments made by the United States, the UK, France and Russia to cease production of weapons material, as well as putting a similar ban on China. This treaty will also put more pressure on Israel, India and Pakistan to agree to international verification.

On 9 August 2005, Ayatollah Ali Khamenei issued a fatwa forbidding the production, stockpiling and use of nuclear weapons. Khamenei's official statement was made at the IAEA General Conference in Vienna. As of February 2006 Iran formally announced that uranium enrichment within their borders has continued. Iran claims it is for peaceful purposes but the United Kingdom, France, Germany, and the United States claim the purpose is for nuclear weapon research and construction.

== Unsanctioned Nuclear Activity or U.N.A ==
=== NPT Non Signatories ===
India, Pakistan and Israel have been "threshold" countries in terms of the international non-proliferation regime. They possess or are quickly capable of assembling one or more nuclear weapons. They have remained outside the 1970 NPT. They are thus largely excluded from trade in nuclear plants or materials, except for safety-related devices for a few safeguarded facilities.

In May 1998 India and Pakistan each exploded several nuclear devices underground. This heightened concerns regarding a nuclear arms race between them, with Pakistan involving the People's Republic of China, an acknowledged nuclear weapons state. Both countries are opposed to the NPT as it stands, and India has consistently attacked the Treaty since its inception in 1970 labeling it as a lopsided treaty in favor of the nuclear powers.

Relations between the two countries are tense and hostile, and the risks of nuclear conflict between them have long been considered quite high. Kashmir is a prime cause of bilateral tension, its sovereignty being in dispute since 1948. There is a persistent low-level bilateral military conflict due to the alleged backing of insurgency by Pakistan in India, and the infiltration of Pakistani state-backed militants into Indian-administered Jammu and Kashmir, along with the disputed status of Kashmir.

Both engaged in a conventional arms race in the 1980s, including sophisticated technology and equipment capable of delivering nuclear weapons. In the 1990s the arms race quickened. In 1994 India reversed a four-year trend of reduced allocations for defence, and despite its much smaller economy, Pakistan was expected to push its own expenditures yet higher. Both have lost their patrons: India, the former USSR, and Pakistan, the United States.

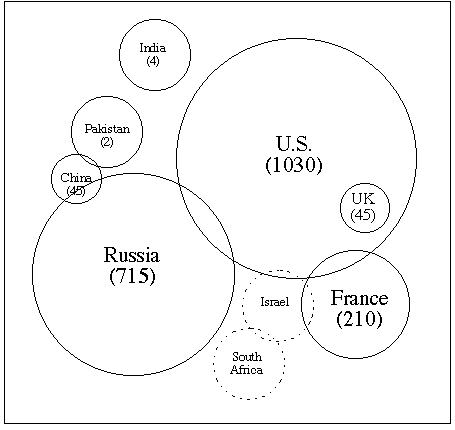
Venn diagram displaying the historical proliferation among declared (solid circles) and undeclared nuclear weapon states (dashed circles). Numbers in parentheses are the explosive nuclear tests conducted by a particular nation. The overlap between Russia and U.S. reflects the purchase by the U.S. Defense Special Weapons Agency.

But it is the growth and modernization of China's nuclear arsenal and its assistance with Pakistan's nuclear power programme and, reportedly, with missile technology, which exacerbate Indian concerns. In particular, as viewed by Indian strategists, Pakistan is aided by China's People's Liberation Army.

==== India ====
Nuclear power for civil use is well established in India. Its civil nuclear strategy has been directed towards complete independence in the nuclear fuel cycle, necessary because of its outspoken rejection of the NPT. Due to economic and technological isolation of India after its nuclear test in 1974, India has largely diverted focus on developing and perfecting the fast breeder technology by intensive materials and fuel cycle research at the dedicated center established for research into fast reactor technology, Indira Gandhi Center for Atomic Research (IGCAR) at Kalpakkam, in the southern part of the country. At the moment, India has a small fast breeder reactor and a much larger Prototype Fast Breeder Reactor. This self-sufficiency extends from uranium exploration and mining through fuel fabrication, heavy water production, reactor design and construction, to reprocessing and waste management. It is also developing technology to utilise its abundant resources of thorium as a nuclear fuel.

India has 14 small nuclear power reactors in commercial operation, two larger ones under construction, and ten more planned. The 14 operating ones (2548 MWe total) comprise:

- two 150 MWe BWRs from the United States, which started up in 1969, now use locally enriched uranium and are under safeguards,
- two small Canadian PHWRs (1972 & 1980), also under safeguards, and
- ten local PHWRs based on Canadian designs, two of 150 and eight 200 MWe.
- two new 540 MWe and two 700 MWe plants at Tarapur (known as TAPP: Tarapur Atomic Power Station)

The two under construction and two of the planned ones are 450 MWe versions of these 200 MWe domestic products. Construction has been seriously delayed by financial and technical problems. In 2001 a final agreement was signed with Russia for the country's first large nuclear power plant, comprising two VVER-1000 reactors, under a Russian-financed US$3 billion contract. The first unit is due to be commissioned in 2007. A further two Russian units are under consideration for the site. Nuclear power supplied 3.1% of India's electricity in 2000.

Its weapons material appears to come from a Canadian-designed 40 MW "research" reactor which started up in 1960, well before the NPT, and a 100 MW indigenous unit in operation since 1985. Both use local uranium, as India does not import any nuclear fuel. It is estimated that India may have built up enough weapons-grade plutonium for a hundred nuclear warheads.

It is widely believed that the nuclear programs of India and Pakistan used Canadian CANDU reactors to produce fissionable materials for their weapons; however, this is not accurate. Both Canada (by supplying the 40 MW research reactor) and the United States (by supplying 21 tons of heavy water) supplied India with the technology necessary to create a nuclear weapons program, dubbed CIRUS (Canada-India Reactor, United States). Canada sold India the reactor on the condition that the reactor and any by-products would be "employed for peaceful purposes only.". Similarly, the United States sold India heavy water for use in the reactor "only... in connection with research into and the use of atomic energy for peaceful purposes". India, in violation of these agreements, used the Canadian-supplied reactor and American-supplied heavy water to produce plutonium for their first nuclear explosion, Smiling Buddha. The Indian government controversially justified this, however, by claiming that Smiling Buddha was a "peaceful nuclear explosion."

The country has at least three other research reactors including the tiny one which is exploring the use of thorium as a nuclear fuel, by breeding fissile U-233. In addition, an advanced heavy-water thorium cycle is under development.

India exploded a nuclear device in 1974, the so-called Smiling Buddha test, which it has consistently claimed was for peaceful purposes. Others saw it as a response to China's nuclear weapons capability. It was then universally perceived, notwithstanding official denials, to possess, or to be able to quickly assemble, nuclear weapons. In 1999 it deployed its own medium-range missile and has developed an intermediate-range missile capable of reaching targets in China's industrial heartland.

In 1995 the United States quietly intervened to head off a proposed nuclear test. However, in 1998 there were five more tests in Operation Shakti. These were unambiguously military, including one claimed to be of a sophisticated thermonuclear device, and their declared purpose was "to help in the design of nuclear weapons of different yields and different delivery systems".

Indian security policies are driven by:

- its determination to be recognized as a dominant power in the region
- its increasing concern with China's expanding nuclear weapons and missile delivery programmes
- its concern with Pakistan's capability to deliver nuclear weapons deep into India

It perceives nuclear weapons as a cost-effective political counter to China's nuclear and conventional weaponry, and the effects of its nuclear weapons policy in provoking Pakistan is, by some accounts, considered incidental. India has had an unhappy relationship with China. After an uneasy ceasefire ended the 1962 war, relations between the two nations were frozen until 1998. Since then a degree of high-level contact has been established and a few elementary confidence-building measures put in place. China still occupies some territory which it captured during the aforementioned war, claimed by India, and India still occupies some territory claimed by China. Its nuclear weapon and missile support for Pakistan is a major bone of contention.

American President George W. Bush met with India Prime Minister Manmohan Singh to discuss India's involvement with nuclear weapons. The two countries agreed that the United States would give nuclear power assistance to India.

==== Pakistan ====
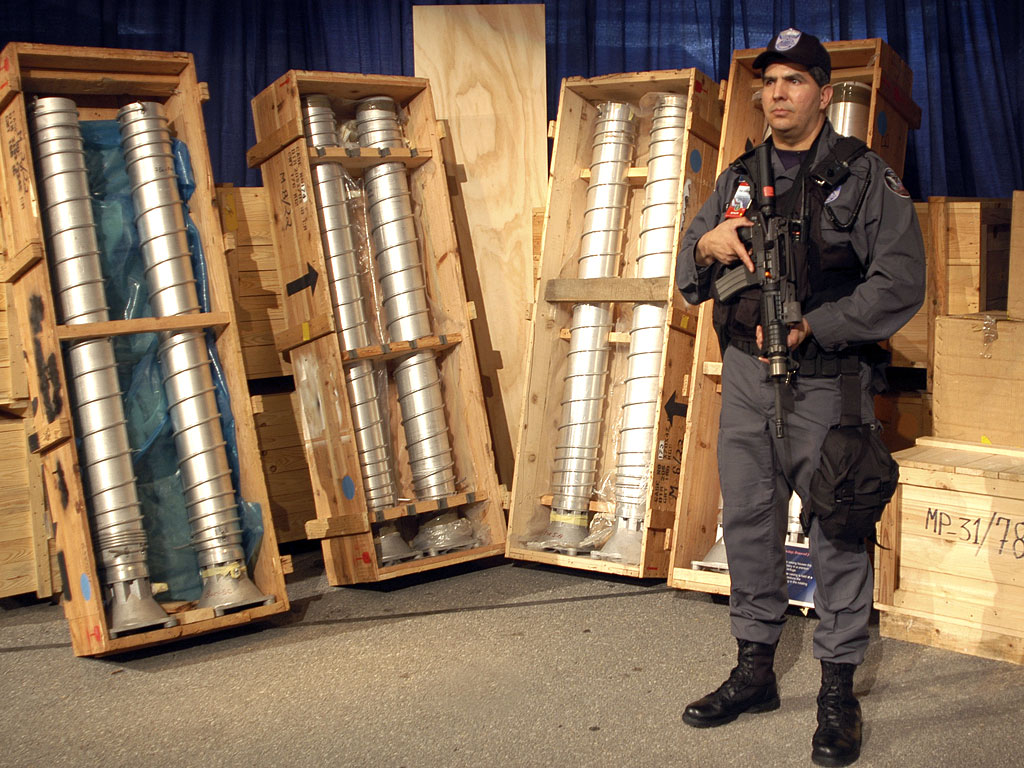
In 2003, Libya admitted that the nuclear weapons-related material including these centrifuges, known as Pak-1, were acquired from Pakistan.

Over the years in Pakistan, nuclear power infrastructure has been well established. It is dedicated to the industrial and economic development of the country. Its current nuclear policy is aimed to promote the socio-economic development of its people as a "foremost priority"; and to fulfill energy, economic, and industrial needs from nuclear sources. As of 2012, there were three operational mega-commercial nuclear power plants while three larger ones were under construction. The nuclear power plants supplied 787 megawatts (MW) (roughly ≈3.6%) of electricity, and the country has projected production of 8800 MW by 2030. Infrastructure established by the IAEA and the U.S. in the 1950s–1960s was based on peaceful research and development and the economic prosperity of the country.

Although the civil-sector nuclear power was established in the 1950s, the country has an active nuclear weapons program which was started in the 1970s. The bomb program has its roots after East Pakistan gained its independence through the Bangladesh Liberation War, as the new nation of Bangladesh, after India's successful intervention led to a decisive victory over Pakistan in 1971. In 1974, when India surprised the world with the successful detonation of its own bomb, codename Smiling Buddha, it became "imperative for Pakistan" to pursue weapons research. According to a leading scientist in the program, it became clear that once India detonated their bomb, "Newton's Third Law" came into "operation", from then on it was a classic case of "action and reaction". Reacting to India's first nuclear weapon test, Prime Minister Zulfikar Ali Bhutto and the country's political and military science circles sensed this test as final and dangerous anticipation to Pakistan's "moral and physical existence." With diplomat Aziz Ahmed on his side, Prime Minister Bhutto launched a serious diplomatic offense and aggressively maintained at the session of the United Nations Security Council:

Pakistan was exposed to a kind of "nuclear threat and blackmail" unparalleled elsewhere. ... If the world's community failed to provide political insurance to Pakistan and other countries against the nuclear blackmail, these countries would be constraint to launch atomic bomb programs of their own! ... [A]ssurances provided by the United Nations were not "Enough!"...

— Zulfikar Ali Bhutto, statement written in "Eating Grass", source

After 1974, Bhutto's government redoubled its effort, this time equally focused on uranium and plutonium. Pakistan had established science directorates in almost all of her embassies in the important countries of the world, with theoretical physicist S.A. Butt being the director. Abdul Qadeer Khan then established a network through Dubai to smuggle URENCO technology to the Engineering Research Laboratories. Earlier, he worked with the Physics Dynamics Research Laboratories (FDO), a subsidiary of the Dutch firm VMF-Stork based in Amsterdam. Later after joining, Urenco, he had access through photographs and documents to the technology. Against popular perception, the technology that Khan had brought from Urenco was based on first generation civil reactor technology, filled with many serious technical errors, though it was an authentic and vital link for the country's gas centrifuge project. After the British Government stopped the British subsidiary of the American Emerson Electric Co. from shipping components to Pakistan, he describes his frustration with a supplier from Germany as: "That man from the German team was unethical. When he did not get the order from us, he wrote a letter to a Labour Party member and questions were asked in [British] Parliament." By 1978, his efforts paid off and made him into a national hero.

In early 1996 the next Prime Minister of Pakistan Benazir Bhutto made it clear that "if India conducts a nuclear test, Pakistan could be forced to "follow suit". In 1997, her statement was echoed by Prime Minister Nawaz Sharif who maintained that "since 1972, [P]akistan had progressed significantly, and we have left that stage (developmental) far behind. Pakistan will not be made a "hostage" to India by signing the CTBT, before (India).!" In May 1998, within weeks of India's nuclear tests, Pakistan announced that it had conducted six underground tests in the Chagai Hills, five on 28 May and one on 30 May. Seismic events consistent with these claims were recorded.

In 2004, the revelation of Khan's efforts led to the exposure of many defunct European consortiums which had defied export restrictions in the 1970s, and of many defunct Dutch companies that exported thousands of centrifuges to Pakistan as early as 1976. Many centrifuge components were apparently manufactured by the Malaysian Scomi Precision Engineering with the assistance of South Asian and German companies, and used a UAE-based computer company as a false front.

It was widely believed to have had direct involvement by the Government of Pakistan. This claim could not be verified due to the refusal of that Government to allow the IAEA to interview the alleged head of the nuclear black market, who happened to be no other than Abdul Qadeer Khan. Confessing his crimes a month later on national television, Khan bailed out the Government by taking full responsibility. Independent investigation conducted by International Institute for Strategic Studies (IISS) confirmed that he had control over the import-export deals, and his acquisition activities were largely unsupervised by Pakistan governmental authorities. All of his activities went undetected for several years. He duly confessed to running the atomic proliferation ring from Pakistan to Iran and North Korea. He was immediately given presidential immunity. The exact nature of involvement at the governmental level is still unclear, but the manner in which the government acted cast doubt on the sincerity of Pakistan. However, the contents of Abdul Qadeer Khan's personal diaries present his perspective on the matters related to his activities concerning nuclear secrets. He claimed that he acted only at the order or "instigation" of the Pakistan government. Even when there was no official authorization, Pakistani military knew of Khan's activity according to the contents of the diaries. On one occasion in 1980, a colonel knew of Khan being in touch with Syria's Defense Minister Gen. Mustafa Tlass and Gen. Hikmat Shihabi. Six months later, Khan was warned by Zia Ul Haq to be careful over "nuclear drawings".

In May 2025, the United States Defense Intelligence Agency's 2025 Worldwide Threat Assessment highlighted Pakistan's nuclear proliferation efforts. It estimated the stockpile at approximately 170 warheads in 2024 and projected a potential increase to 200 by 2025. The report linked this growth to Pakistan's perception of India as an existential threat. It stated that Pakistan intended to counter India's conventional superiority through the development of tactical nuclear weapons. The report also noted that Pakistan had not adopted a "No First Use" policy.

==== North Korea ====
The Democratic People's Republic of Korea (or better known as North Korea), joined the NPT in 1985 and had subsequently signed a safeguards agreement with the IAEA. However, it was believed that North Korea was diverting plutonium extracted from the fuel of its reactor at Yongbyon, for use in nuclear weapons. The subsequent confrontation with IAEA on the issue of inspections and suspected violations, resulted in North Korea threatening to withdraw from the NPT in 1993. This eventually led to negotiations with the United States resulting in the Agreed Framework of 1994, which provided for IAEA safeguards being applied to its reactors and spent fuel rods. These spent fuel rods were sealed in canisters by the United States to prevent North Korea from extracting plutonium from them. North Korea had to therefore freeze its plutonium programme.

During this period, Pakistan-North Korea cooperation in missile technology transfer was being established. A high-level delegation of Pakistan military visited North Korea in August–September 1992, reportedly to discuss the supply of missile technology to Pakistan. In 1993, PM Benazir Bhutto repeatedly traveled to China, and the paid state visit to North Korea. The visits are believed to be related to the subsequent acquisition technology to developed its Ghauri system by Pakistan. During the period 1992–1994, A.Q. Khan was reported to have visited North Korea thirteen times. The missile cooperation program with North Korea was under Dr. A. Q. Khan Research Laboratories. At this time China was under U.S. pressure not to supply the M Dongfeng series of missiles to Pakistan. It is believed by experts that possibly with Chinese connivance and facilitation, the latter was forced to approach North Korea for missile transfers. Reports indicate that North Korea was willing to supply missile sub-systems including rocket motors, inertial guidance systems, control and testing equipment for US$50 million.

It is not clear what North Korea got in return. Joseph S. Bermudez Jr. in Jane's Defence Weekly (27 November 2002) reports that Western analysts had begun to question what North Korea received in payment for the missiles; many suspected it was the nuclear technology. The KRL was in charge of both the uranium program and also of the missile program with North Korea. It is therefore likely during this period that cooperation in nuclear technology between Pakistan and North Korea was initiated. Western intelligence agencies began to notice the exchange of personnel, technology and components between KRL and entities of the North Korean 2nd Economic Committee (responsible for weapons production).

A New York Times report on 18 October 2002 quoted U.S. intelligence officials having stated that Pakistan was a major supplier of critical equipment to North Korea. The report added that equipment such as gas centrifuges appeared to have been "part of a barter deal" in which North Korea supplied Pakistan with missiles. Separate reports indicate (The Washington Times, 22 November 2002) that U.S. intelligence had as early as 1999 picked up signs that North Korea was continuing to develop nuclear arms. Other reports also indicate that North Korea had been working covertly to develop an enrichment capability for nuclear weapons for at least five years and had used technology obtained from Pakistan (The Washington Times, 18 October 2002).

==== Israel ====
Israel is also thought to possess an arsenal of potentially up to several hundred nuclear warheads based on estimates of the amount of fissile material produced by Israel. This has never been openly confirmed or denied however, due to Israel's policy of deliberate ambiguity.

An Israeli nuclear installation is located about ten kilometers to the south of Dimona, the Negev Nuclear Research Center. Its construction commenced in 1958, with French assistance. The official reason given by the Israeli and French governments was to build a nuclear reactor to power a "desalination plant", in order to "green the Negev". The purpose of the Dimona plant is widely assumed to be the manufacturing of nuclear weapons, and the majority of defense experts have concluded that it does in fact do that. However, the Israeli government refuses to confirm or deny this publicly, a policy it refers to as "ambiguity".

Norway sold 20 tonnes of heavy water needed for the reactor to Israel in 1959 and 1960 in a secret deal. There were no "safeguards" required in this deal to prevent the use of heavy water for non-peaceful purposes. The British newspaper Daily Express accused Israel of working on a bomb in 1960. When the United States intelligence community discovered the purpose of the Dimona plant in the early 1960s, it demanded that Israel agree to international inspections. Israel agreed, but on a condition that the U.S., rather than IAEA, inspectors were used, and that Israel would receive advanced notice of all inspections.

Some claim that because Israel knew the schedule of the inspectors' visits, it was able to hide the alleged purpose of the site from the inspectors by installing temporary false walls and other devices before each inspection. The inspectors eventually informed the U.S. government that their inspections were useless due to Israeli restrictions on what areas of the facility they could inspect. In 1969, the United States terminated the inspections.

In 1986, Mordechai Vanunu, a former technician at the Dimona plant, revealed to the media some evidence of Israel's nuclear program. Israeli Mossad agents arrested him in Italy, drugged him and transported him to Israel. An Israeli court then tried him in secret on charges of treason and espionage, and sentenced him to eighteen years imprisonment. He was freed on 21 April 2004, but was severely limited by the Israeli government. He was arrested again on 11 November 2004, though formal charges were not immediately filed.

Comments on photographs taken by Vanunu inside the Negev Nuclear Research Center have been made by prominent scientists. British nuclear weapons scientist Frank Barnaby, who questioned Vanunu over several days, estimated Israel had enough plutonium for about 150 weapons.

According to Lieutenant Colonel Warner D. Farr in a report to the USAF Counterproliferation Center, while France was previously a leader in nuclear research "Israel and France were at a similar level of expertise after WWII, and Israeli scientists could make significant contributions to the French effort." In 1986 Francis Perrin, French high-commissioner for atomic energy from 1951 to 1970 stated that in 1949 Israeli scientists were invited to the Saclay nuclear research facility, this cooperation leading to a joint effort including sharing of knowledge between French and Israeli scientists especially those with knowledge from the Manhattan Project.

=== Nuclear arms control in South Asia ===
The public stance of India and Pakistan on non-proliferation differs markedly. Pakistan has initiated a series of regional security proposals. It has repeatedly proposed a nuclear-free zone in South Asia, and has proclaimed its willingness to engage in nuclear disarmament and to sign the Non-Proliferation Treaty if India would do so. It has endorsed a United States proposal for a regional five power conference to consider non-proliferation in South Asia.

India has taken the view that solutions to regional security issues should be found at the international rather than the regional level, since its chief concern is with China. It therefore rejects Pakistan's proposals.

Instead, the 'Gandhi Plan', put forward in 1988, proposed the revision of the Non-Proliferation Treaty, which it regards as inherently discriminatory in favor of the nuclear-weapon States, and a timetable for complete nuclear weapons disarmament. It endorsed early proposals for a Comprehensive Test Ban Treaty and for an international convention to ban the production of highly enriched uranium and plutonium for weapons purposes, known as the 'cut-off' convention.

The United States for some years, especially under the Clinton administration, pursued a variety of initiatives to persuade India and Pakistan to abandon their nuclear weapons programs and to accept comprehensive international safeguards on all their nuclear activities. To this end, the Clinton administration proposed a conference of the five nuclear-weapon states, Japan, Germany, India and Pakistan.

India refused this and similar previous proposals, and countered with demands that other potential weapons states, such as Iran and North Korea, should be invited, and that regional limitations would only be acceptable if they were accepted equally by China. The United States would not accept the participation of Iran and North Korea and these initiatives have lapsed.

Another, more recent approach, centers on 'capping' the production of fissile material for weapons purposes, which would hopefully be followed by 'roll back'. To this end, India and the United States jointly sponsored a UN General Assembly resolution in 1993 calling for negotiations for a 'cut-off' convention. Should India and Pakistan join such a convention, they would have to agree to halt the production of fissile materials for weapons and to accept international verification on their relevant nuclear facilities (enrichment and reprocessing plants). It appears that India is now prepared to join negotiations regarding such a Cut-off Treaty, under the UN Conference on Disarmament.

Bilateral confidence-building measures between India and Pakistan to reduce the prospects of confrontation have been limited. In 1990 each side ratified a treaty not to attack the other's nuclear installations, and at the end of 1991 they provided one another with a list showing the location of all their nuclear plants, even though the respective lists were regarded as not being wholly accurate. Early in 1994 India proposed a bilateral agreement for a 'no first use' of nuclear weapons and an extension of the 'no attack' treaty to cover civilian and industrial targets as well as nuclear installations.

Having promoted the Comprehensive Test Ban Treaty since 1954, India dropped its support in 1995 and in 1996 attempted to block the Treaty. Following the 1998 tests the question has been reopened and both Pakistan and India have indicated their intention to sign the CTBT. Indian ratification may be conditional upon the five weapons states agreeing to specific reductions in nuclear arsenals. The UN Conference on Disarmament has also called upon both countries "to accede without delay to the Non-Proliferation Treaty", presumably as non-weapons states.

=== NPT signatories ===
==== Egypt ====
In 2004 and 2005, Egypt disclosed past undeclared nuclear activities and material to the IAEA. In 2007 and 2008, high-enriched and low-enriched uranium particles were found in environmental samples taken in Egypt. In 2008, the IAEA states Egypt's statements were consistent with its own findings. In May 2009, Reuters reported that the IAEA was conducting further investigation in Egypt.

==== Iran ====
In 2003, the IAEA reported that Iran had been in breach of its obligations to comply with provisions of its safeguard agreement. In 2005, the IAEA Board of Governors voted in a rare non-consensus decision to find Iran in non-compliance with its NPT Safeguards Agreement and to report that non-compliance to the UN Security Council. In response, the UN Security Council passed a series of resolutions citing concerns about the program. Iran's representative to the UN argues sanctions compel Iran to abandon its rights under the Nuclear Nonproliferation Treaty to peaceful nuclear technology. Iran says its uranium enrichment program is exclusively for peaceful purposes and has enriched uranium to "less than 5 percent," consistent with fuel for a nuclear power plant and significantly below the purity of WEU (around 90%) typically used in a weapons program. The director general of the International Atomic Energy Agency, Yukiya Amano, said in 2009 he had not seen any evidence in IAEA official documents that Iran was developing nuclear weapons.

==== Iraq ====
Up to the late 1980s it was generally assumed that any undeclared nuclear activities would have to be based on the diversion of nuclear material from safeguards. States acknowledged the possibility of nuclear activities entirely separate from those covered by safeguards, but it was assumed they would be detected by national intelligence activities. There was no particular effort by IAEA to attempt to detect them.

Iraq had been making efforts to secure a nuclear potential since the 1960s. In the late 1970s a specialised plant, Osiraq, was constructed near Baghdad. The plant was attacked during the Iran–Iraq War and was destroyed by Israeli bombers in June 1981.

Not until the 1990 NPT Review Conference did some states raise the possibility of making more use of (for example) provisions for "special inspections" in existing NPT Safeguards Agreements. Special inspections can be undertaken at locations other than those where safeguards routinely apply, if there is reason to believe there may be undeclared material or activities.

After inspections in Iraq following the UN Gulf War cease-fire resolution showed the extent of Iraq's clandestine nuclear weapons program, it became clear that the IAEA would have to broaden the scope of its activities. Iraq was an NPT Party, and had thus agreed to place all its nuclear material under IAEA safeguards. But the inspections revealed that it had been pursuing an extensive clandestine uranium enrichment programme, as well as a nuclear weapons design programme.

The main thrust of Iraq's uranium enrichment program was the development of technology for electromagnetic isotope separation (EMIS) of indigenous uranium. This uses the same principles as a mass spectrometer (albeit on a much larger scale). Ions of uranium-238 and uranium-235 are separated because they describe arcs of different radii when they move through a magnetic field. This process was used in the Manhattan Project to make the highly enriched uranium used in the Hiroshima bomb, but was abandoned soon afterwards.

The Iraqis did the basic research work at their nuclear research establishment at Tuwaitha, near Baghdad, and were building two full-scale facilities at Tarmiya and Ash Sharqat, north of Baghdad. However, when the war broke out, only a few separators had been installed at Tarmiya, and none at Ash Sharqat.

The Iraqis were also very interested in centrifuge enrichment, and had been able to acquire some components including some carbon-fibre rotors, which they were at an early stage of testing. In May 1998, Newsweek reported that Abdul Qadeer Khan had sent Iraq centrifuge designs, which were apparently confiscated by the UNMOVIC officials. Iraqi officials said "the documents were authentic but that they had not agreed to work with A. Q. Khan, fearing an ISI sting operation, due to strained relations between two countries. The Government of Pakistan and A. Q. Khan strongly denied this allegation whilst the government declared the evidence to be "fraudulent".

They were clearly in violation of their NPT and safeguards obligations, and the IAEA Board of Governors ruled to that effect. The UN Security Council then ordered the IAEA to remove, destroy or render harmless Iraq's nuclear weapons capability. This was done by mid-1998, but Iraq then ceased all cooperation with the UN, so the IAEA withdrew from this work.

These events from Iraq prompted a broad reconsideration of the objectives of these safeguards.

==== Libya ====
Libya possesses ballistic missiles and previously pursued nuclear weapons under the leadership of Muammar Gaddafi. On 19 December 2003, Gaddafi announced that Libya would voluntarily eliminate all materials, equipment and programs that could lead to internationally proscribed weapons, including weapons of mass destruction and long-range ballistic missiles. Libya signed the Nuclear Non-Proliferation Treaty (NPT) in 1968 and ratified it in 1975, and concluded a safeguards agreement with the IAEA in 1980. In March 2004, the IAEA Board of Governors welcomed Libya's decision to eliminate its formerly undeclared nuclear program, which it found had violated Libya's safeguards agreement, and approved Libya's Additional Protocol. The United States and the United Kingdom assisted Libya in removing equipment and material from its nuclear weapons program, with independent verification by the IAEA.

==== Myanmar ====
A report in the Sydney Morning Herald and Searchina, a Japanese newspaper, report that two Myanma defectors saying that the State Peace and Development Council junta was secretly building a nuclear reactor and plutonium extraction facility with North Korea's help, with the aim of acquiring its first nuclear bomb in five years. According to the report, "The secret complex, much of it in caves tunnelled into a mountain at Naung Laing in northern Burma, runs parallel to a civilian reactor being built at another site by Russia that both the Russians and Burmese say will be put under international safeguards." In 2002, Myanmar had notified IAEA of its intention to pursue a civilian nuclear programme. Later, Russia announced that it would build a nuclear reactor in Myanmar. There have also been reports that two Pakistani scientists, from the AQ Khan stable, had been dispatched to Myanmar where they had settled down, to help Myanmar's project.

Recently, the David Albright-led Institute for Science and International Security (ISIS) rang alarm bells about Myanmar attempting a nuclear project with North Korean help. If true, the full weight of international pressure will be brought against Myanmar, said officials familiar with developments. But equally, the information that has been peddled by the defectors is also "preliminary" and could be used by the west to turn the screws on Myanmar—on democracy and human rights issues—in the run-up to the elections in the country in 2010. During an ASEAN meeting in Thailand in July 2009, US secretary of state Hillary Clinton highlighted concerns of the North Korean link. "We know there are also growing concerns about military cooperation between North Korea and Burma which we take very seriously," Clinton said. However, in 2012, after contact with the American president, Barack Obama, the Burmese leader, Thein Sein, renounced military ties with DPRK (North Korea).

==== North Korea ====
The Democratic People's Republic of Korea (DPRK) acceded to the NPT in 1985 as a condition for the supply of a nuclear power station by the USSR. However, it delayed concluding its NPT Safeguards Agreement with the IAEA, a process which should take only 18 months, until April 1992.

During that period, it brought into operation a small gas-cooled, graphite-moderated, natural-uranium (metal) fuelled "Experimental Power Reactor" of about 25 MWt (5 MWe), based on the UK Magnox design. While this was a well-suited design to start a wholly indigenous nuclear reactor development, it also exhibited all the features of a small plutonium production reactor for weapons purposes. North Korea also made substantial progress in the construction of two larger reactors designed on the same principles, a prototype of about 200 MWt (50 MWe), and a full-scale version of about 800 MWt (200 MWe). They made only slow progress; construction halted on both in 1994 and has not resumed. Both reactors have degraded considerably since that time and would take significant efforts to refurbish.

In addition, it completed and commissioned a reprocessing plant that makes the Magnox spent nuclear fuel safe, recovering uranium and plutonium. That plutonium, if the fuel was only irradiated to a very low burn-up, would have been in a form very suitable for weapons. Although all these facilities at the Yongbyon Nuclear Scientific Research Center were to be under safeguards, there was always the risk that at some stage, the DPRK would withdraw from the NPT and use the plutonium for weapons.

One of the first steps in applying NPT safeguards is for the IAEA to verify the initial stocks of uranium and plutonium to ensure that all the nuclear materials in the country have been declared for safeguards purposes. While undertaking this work in 1992, IAEA inspectors found discrepancies that indicated that the reprocessing plant had been used more often than the DPRK had declared, which suggested that the DPRK could have weapons-grade plutonium which it had not declared to the IAEA. Information passed to the IAEA by a Member State (as required by the IAEA) supported that suggestion by indicating that the DPRK had two undeclared waste or other storage sites.

In February 1993 the IAEA called on the DPRK to allow special inspections of the two sites so that the initial stocks of nuclear material could be verified. The DPRK refused, and on 12 March announced its intention to withdraw from the NPT (three months' notice is required). In April 1993 the IAEA Board concluded that the DPRK was in non-compliance with its safeguards obligations and reported the matter to the UN Security Council. In June 1993 the DPRK announced that it had "suspended" its withdrawal from the NPT, but subsequently claimed a "special status" with respect to its safeguards obligations. This was rejected by IAEA.

Once the DPRK's non-compliance had been reported to the UN Security Council, the essential part of the IAEA's mission had been completed. Inspections in the DPRK continued, although inspectors were increasingly hampered in what they were permitted to do by the DPRK's claim of a "special status". However, some 8,000 corroding fuel rods associated with the experimental reactor have remained under close surveillance.

Following bilateral negotiations between the United States and the DPRK, and the conclusion of the Agreed Framework in October 1994, the IAEA has been given additional responsibilities. The agreement requires a freeze on the operation and construction of the DPRK's plutonium production reactors and their related facilities, and the IAEA is responsible for monitoring the freeze until the facilities are eventually dismantled. The DPRK remains uncooperative with the IAEA verification work and has yet to comply with its safeguards agreement.

While Iraq was defeated in a war, allowing the UN the opportunity to seek out and destroy its nuclear weapons programme as part of the cease-fire conditions, the DPRK was not defeated, nor was it vulnerable to other measures, such as trade sanctions. It can scarcely afford to import anything, and sanctions on vital commodities, such as oil, would either be ineffective or risk provoking war.

Ultimately, the DPRK was persuaded to stop what appeared to be its nuclear weapons programme in exchange, under the agreed framework, for about US$5 billion in energy-related assistance. This included two 1000 MWe light-water nuclear power reactors based on an advanced U.S. System-80 design.

In January 2003 the DPRK withdrew from the NPT. In response, a series of discussions among the DPRK, the United States, and China, a series of six-party talks (the parties being the DPRK, the ROK, China, Japan, the United States and Russia) were held in Beijing; the first beginning in April 2004 concerning North Korea's weapons program.

On 10 January 2005, North Korea declared that it was in the possession of nuclear weapons. On 19 September 2005, the fourth round of the Six-Party Talks ended with a joint statement in which North Korea agreed to end its nuclear programs and return to the NPT in exchange for diplomatic, energy and economic assistance. However, by the end of 2005 the DPRK had halted all six-party talks because the United States froze certain DPRK international financial assets such as those in a bank in Macau.

On 9 October 2006, North Korea announced that it has performed its first-ever nuclear weapon test. On 18 December 2006, the six-party talks finally resumed. On 13 February 2007, the parties announced "Initial Actions" to implement the 2005 joint statement including shutdown and disablement of North Korean nuclear facilities in exchange for energy assistance. Reacting to UN sanctions imposed after missile tests in April 2009, North Korea withdrew from the six-party talks, restarted its nuclear facilities and conducted a second nuclear test on 25 May 2009.

On 12 February 2013, North Korea conducted an underground nuclear explosion with an estimated yield of 6 to 7 kilotonnes. The detonation registered a magnitude 4.9 disturbance in the area around the epicenter.

==== Russia ====
Security of nuclear weapons in Russia remains a matter of concern. According to high-ranking Russian SVR defector Tretyakov, he had a meeting with two Russian businessmen representing a state-created C-W corporation in 1991. They came up with a project of destroying large quantities of chemical wastes collected from Western countries at the island of Novaya Zemlya (a test place for Soviet nuclear weapons) using an underground nuclear blast. The project was rejected by Canadian representatives, but one of the businessmen told Tretyakov that he keeps his own nuclear bomb at his dacha outside Moscow. Tretyakov thought that man was insane, but the "businessmen" (Vladimir K. Dmitriev) replied: "Do not be so naive. With economic conditions the way they are in Russia today, anyone with enough money can buy a nuclear bomb. It's no big deal really".

==== South Africa ====
In 1991, South Africa acceded to the NPT, concluded a comprehensive safeguards agreement with the IAEA, and submitted a report on its nuclear material subject to safeguards. At the time, the state had a nuclear power programme producing nearly 10% of the country's electricity, whereas Iraq and North Korea only had research reactors.

The IAEA's initial verification task was complicated by South Africa's announcement that between 1979 and 1989 it built and then dismantled a number of nuclear weapons. South Africa asked the IAEA to verify the conclusion of its weapons programme. In 1995 the IAEA declared that it was satisfied all materials were accounted for and the weapons programme had been terminated and dismantled.

South Africa has signed the NPT, and now holds the distinction of being the only known state to have indigenously produced nuclear weapons, and then verifiably dismantled them.

==== Sweden ====
After World War II, Sweden considered building nuclear weapons to deter a Soviet invasion. From 1945 to 1972 the Swedish government ran a clandestine nuclear weapons program under the guise of civilian defense research at the Swedish National Defence Research Institute. By the late 1950s, the work had reached the point where underground testing was feasible. However, at that time the Riksdag prohibited research and development of nuclear weapons, pledging that research should be done only for the purpose of defense against nuclear attack. The option to continue development was abandoned in 1966, and Sweden subsequently signed the Non-Proliferation Treaty in 1968. The program was finally concluded in 1972.

==== Syria ====
On 6 September 2007, Israel bombed an officially unidentified site in Syria which it later asserted was a nuclear reactor under construction (see Operation Outside the Box). The alleged reactor was not asserted to be operational and it was not asserted that nuclear material had been introduced into it. Syria said the site was a military site and was not involved in any nuclear activities. The IAEA requested Syria to provide further access to the site and any other locations where the debris and equipment from the building had been stored. Syria denounced what it called the Western "fabrication and forging of facts" in regards to the incident. IAEA Director General Mohamed ElBaradei criticized the strikes and deplored that information regarding the matter had not been shared with his agency earlier.

==== Taiwan ====
During the Cold War, the United States deployed nuclear weapons at Tainan Air Force Base of Taiwan as part of the United States Taiwan Defense Command. Nonetheless, Taiwan began its own nuclear weapon program under the auspices of the Institute of Nuclear Energy Research (INER) at the Chungshan Institute of Science and Technology since 1967. Taiwan was able to acquire nuclear technology from abroad (including a research reactor from Canada and low-grade plutonium from the United States), which were subject to IAEA safeguards, but which Taiwan used for its nuclear weapon program. In 1972, US president ordered to remove the nuclear weapons from Taiwan by 1974.

Then recognized as the Republic of China, Taiwan ratified the NPT in 1970. After the IAEA found evidences of Taiwan's efforts to produce the weapons-grade plutonium, Taiwan agreed to dismantle its nuclear weapon program under U.S. pressure in September 1976. The nuclear reactor was shut down and the plutonium mostly returned to the U.S. However secret nuclear activities were exposed after the Lieyu massacre by Colonel Chang Hsien-yi, deputy director of INER, who defected to the U.S. in December 1987 and produced a cache of incriminating documents. This program was also halted under the U.S. pressure.

== Breakout capability ==
For a state that does not possess nuclear weapons, the capability to produce one or more weapons quickly and with little warning is called a breakout capability.

- Japan, with its civil nuclear infrastructure and experience, has a stockpile of separated plutonium that could be fabricated into weapons relatively quickly.
- Iran, according to some observers, may be seeking (or have already achieved) a breakout capability, with its stockpile of low-enriched uranium and its capability to enrich further to weapons-grade.

== Arguments for and against proliferation ==
There has been much debate in the academic study of international security as to the advisability of proliferation. In the late 1950s and early 1960s, Gen. Pierre Marie Gallois of France, an adviser to Charles DeGaulle, argued in books like The Balance of Terror: Strategy for the Nuclear Age (1961) that mere possession of a nuclear arsenal, what the French called the Force de frappe, was enough to ensure deterrence, and thus concluded that the spread of nuclear weapons could increase international stability.

Some very prominent neo-realist scholars, such as Kenneth Waltz, emeritus Professor of Political Science at the University of California, Berkeley and Adjunct Senior Research Scholar at Columbia University, and John Mearsheimer, R. Wendell Harrison Distinguished Service Professor of Political Science at the University of Chicago, continue to argue along the lines of Gallois in a separate development. Specifically, these scholars advocate some forms of nuclear proliferation, arguing that it will decrease the likelihood of war, especially in troubled regions of the world. Aside from the majority opinion which opposes proliferation in any form, there are two schools of thought on the matter: those, like Mearsheimer, who favor selective proliferation, and those such as Waltz, who advocate a laissez-faire attitude to programs like North Korea's.

=== Total proliferation ===
In embryo, Waltz argues that the logic of mutually assured destruction (MAD) should work in all security environments, regardless of historical tensions or recent hostility. He sees the Cold War as the ultimate proof of MAD logic—the only occasion when enmity between two Great Powers did not result in military conflict. This was, he argues, because nuclear weapons promote caution in decision-makers. Neither Washington nor Moscow would risk a nuclear apocalypse to advance territorial or power goals, hence a peaceful stalemate ensued (Waltz and Sagan (2003), p. 24). Waltz believes there to be no reason why this effect would not occur in all circumstances.

Todd Sechser and Matthew Fuhrmann find that nuclear weapons do not necessarily lead states to be more successful in coercive diplomacy. They argue that nuclear weapons are useful for defense, but are not effective offensive tools. As a consequence, they write that nuclear proliferation may "be less harmful for international security than many believe" while cautioning that nuclear proliferation may still be harmful due to miscalculation, terrorism and sabotage.

=== Selective proliferation ===
John Mearsheimer would not support Waltz's optimism in the majority of potential instances; however, he has argued for nuclear proliferation as policy in certain places, such as post–Cold War Europe. In two famous articles, Mearsheimer opined that Europe was bound to return to its pre–Cold War environment of regular conflagration and suspicion at some point in the future. He advocated arming both Germany and Ukraine with nuclear weaponry in order to achieve a balance of power between these states in the east and France/UK in the west and predicted that otherwise war would eventually break out on the European continent. Russia did invade Ukraine in 2022.

Another separate argument against Waltz's open proliferation and in favor of Mearsheimer's selective distribution is the possibility of nuclear terrorism. Some countries included in the aforementioned laissez-faire distribution could predispose the transfer of nuclear materials or a bomb falling into the hands of groups not affiliated with any governments. Such countries would not have the political will or ability to safeguard attempts at devices being transferred to a third party. Not being deterred by self-annihilation, terrorism groups could push forth their own nuclear agendas or be used as shadow fronts to carry out the attack plans by mentioned unstable governments.

=== Arguments against both positions ===
There are numerous arguments presented against both selective and total proliferation, generally targeting the very neorealist assumptions (such as the primacy of military security in state agendas, the weakness of international institutions, and the long-run unimportance of economic integration and globalization to state strategy) its proponents tend to make. With respect to Mearsheimer's specific example of Europe, many economists and neoliberals argue that the economic integration of Europe through the development of the European Union has made war in most of the European continent so disastrous economically so as to serve as an effective deterrent. Constructivists take this one step further, frequently arguing that the development of EU political institutions has led or will lead to the development of a nascent European identity, which most states on the European continent wish to partake in to some degree or another, and which makes all states within or aspiring to be within the EU regard war between them as unthinkable.

As for Waltz, the general opinion is that most states are not in a position to safely guard against nuclear use, that he underestimates the long-standing antipathy in many regions, and that weak states will be unable to prevent—or will actively provide for—the disastrous possibility of nuclear terrorism. Waltz has dealt with all of these objections at some point in his work, though some scholars feel he has not adequately responded (e.g.: Betts, 2000).

The Learning Channel documentary Doomsday: "On The Brink" illustrated 40 years of U.S. and Soviet nuclear weapons accidents. Even the 1995 Norwegian rocket incident demonstrated a potential scenario in which Russian democratization and military downsizing at the end of the Cold War did not eliminate the danger of accidental nuclear war through command and control errors. After asking: might a future Russian ruler or renegade Russian general be tempted to use nuclear weapons to make foreign policy? The documentary writers revealed a greater danger of Russian security over its nuclear stocks, but especially the ultimate danger of human nature to want the ultimate weapon of mass destruction to exercise political and military power. According to the documentary, the Soviets, Russians, and Americans came very close to global catastrophe. History and military experts agree that proliferation can be slowed, but never stopped (technology cannot be uninvented).

=== Proliferation begets proliferation ===
'Proliferation begets proliferation' is a concept described by professor of political science Scott Sagan in his article, "Why Do States Build Nuclear Weapons?". This concept can be described as a strategic chain reaction. If one state produces a nuclear weapon it creates almost a domino effect within the region. States in the region will seek to acquire nuclear weapons to balance or eliminate the security threat. Sagan describes this reaction in his article where he states, "Every time one state develops nuclear weapons to balance against its main rival, it also creates a nuclear threat to another region, which then has to initiate its own nuclear weapons program to maintain its national security".

Sagan laid out the historical pattern: When the United States demonstrated that it had nuclear weapon capability with the atomic bombing of Hiroshima and Nagasaki, the Soviet Union started to develop its program in preparation for the Cold War. The Soviet military buildup caused France and the United Kingdom to view it as a security threat, so they too pursued nuclear weapons. (Sagan, p. 71) Even though proliferation causes proliferation, this does not guarantee that other states will successfully develop nuclear weapons because the economic stability of a state plays an important role in whether the state will successfully be able to acquire nuclear weapons. The article written by Dong-Jong Joo and Erik Gartzke discusses how the economy of a country determines whether they will successfully acquire nuclear weapons.

==== Iran ====
Former Iranian President Mahmoud Ahmadinejad has been a frequent critic of the concept of "nuclear apartheid" as it has been put into practice by several countries, particularly the United States. In an interview with CNN's Christiane Amanpour, Ahmadinejad said that Iran was "against 'nuclear apartheid,' which means some have the right to possess it, use the fuel, and then sell it to another country for 10 times its value. We're against that. We say clean energy is the right of all countries. But also it is the duty and the responsibility of all countries, including ours, to set up frameworks to stop the proliferation of it." Hours after that interview, he spoke passionately in favor of Iran's right to develop nuclear technology, claiming the nation should have the same liberties.

Iran is a signatory of the Nuclear Non-Proliferation Treaty and claims that any work done in regards to nuclear technology is related only to civilian uses, which is acceptable under the treaty. In 2005, the International Atomic Energy Agency found that Iran violated its safeguards obligations under the treaty by performing uranium-enrichment in secret, after which the United Nations Security Council ordered Iran to suspend all uranium-enrichment until July 2015.

==== India ====
India has also been discussed in the context of "nuclear apartheid". India has consistently attempted to pass measures that would call for full international disarmament, however, they have not succeeded due to protests from those states that already have nuclear weapons. In light of this, India viewed nuclear weapons as a necessary right for all nations as long as certain states were still in possession of nuclear weapons. India stated that nuclear issues were directly related to national security.

Years before India's first underground nuclear test in 1998, the Comprehensive Nuclear-Test-Ban Treaty was passed. Some have argued that coercive language was used in an attempt to persuade India to sign the treaty, which was pushed for heavily by neighboring China. India viewed the treaty as a means for countries that already had nuclear weapons, primarily the five nations of the United Nations Security Council, to keep their weapons while ensuring that no other nations could develop them.

=== Security guarantees ===
In their article, "The Correlates of Nuclear Proliferation," Sonali Singh and Christopher R. Way argue that states protected by a security guarantee from a great power, particularly if backed by the "nuclear umbrella" of extended deterrence, have less of an incentive to acquire their own nuclear weapons. States that lack such guarantees are more likely to feel their security threatened and so have greater incentives to bolster or assemble nuclear arsenals. As a result, it is then argued that bipolarity may prevent proliferation whereas multipolarity may actually influence proliferation.

== Artificial intelligence ==
Concerns have been raised that widespread use of large language models (LLMs) since 2023 could assist in the technical understanding of nuclear weapons for terrorism or espionage purposes. The company Anthropic, which maintains the public LLM Claude, has since 2024 collaborated with the National Nuclear Security Administration of the US Department of Energy, to develop nuclear technology-related filters, intended to be shared with the Frontier Model Forum, which includes AI giants Amazon, Google, OpenAI, Meta, and Microsoft. The filters can distinguish specifically nuclear weapons-related inquiries, from an opposing example of a scientist's inquiry on civilian nuclear power. The NNSA carried out a year of red-teaming tests, leading to a filter with a 94.8% true positive rate for "harmful conversations", a 5.2% false negative rate, allowing "harmful conversations" as benign, and a 0% false positive rate. LLMs, being purely trained on large data sets of human-written text, may suffer from limitations on the accuracy of physics-related generated answers, while in March 2025 it was reported that Nvidia was developing a "world model", distinct from LLMs and trained on physical data.

== See also ==
- 2010 Nuclear Security Summit
- Alsos Digital Library for Nuclear Issues
- Anti-nuclear movement
- Chemical weapon proliferation
- Commission on the Prevention of WMD proliferation and terrorism
- Comprehensive Nuclear-Test-Ban Treaty
- Fissile Material Cut-off Treaty
- International Atomic Energy Agency
- Intermediate-Range Nuclear Forces Treaty
- International Science and Technology Center
- Institute for Science and International Security
- Institute of Nuclear Materials Management
- List of nuclear weapons tests
- List of states with nuclear weapons
- Nuclear disarmament
- Nuclear power
- Nuclear sharing
- Nuclear-weapon-free zone
- Nuclear warfare
- Nuclear weapon
- Nuclear winter
- Nuclear terrorism
- Nuclear ethics
- Renovation of the nuclear weapon arsenal of the United States
- Seabed Arms Control Treaty
- Tehran International Conference on Disarmament and Non-Proliferation, 2010
- Ten Threats identified by the United Nations
- Treaty on the Non-Proliferation of Nuclear Weapons
