= Non-state =

Non-state describes a stakeholder or force in a debate or conflict in which sovereign states and international organizations are the major and minor parties, respectively. Non-state can refer to anything that is not affiliated with, supported by, or connected directly to a sovereign state or one of its governmental organizations, including in international commerce. Non-state may also refer to groups that are unincorporated within a particular state, or are unknown to the state or nation they are within.

- Non-state actor (NSA) – in international relations (including human rights), any influential stakeholder or force which is not a recognized state; this may including non-profit and non-governmental organizations, corporations, political parties, loosely organized social movements, or powerful individuals
  - Benign non-state actor (BNSA) – organizations engaged in benign or benevolent international affairs, most often involving human rights, civil right, and environmental rights; may, depending on context, also include individual representatives of non-governmental organizations (e.g. goodwill ambassadors and humanitarian aid workers), or unaffiliated individuals (e.g. philanthropists)
  - Violent non-state actor (VNSA), also known as armed non-state actors (ANSA) – organizations that do not belong to or ally themselves with a state, and who employ violence in pursuit of their goals; depending on context, may also include individual members of such groups
- Non-state nation, or stateless nation – an ethnic group or nation that does not possess its own state and is not the majority population in any nation state. The term "stateless" implies that the group "should have" such a state; some indigenous tribes and the Amish are examples of stateless nations.
- Non-state school, a.k.a. independent, non-governmental, or nonstate school – an educational institution not administered by local, state, or national governments; synonymous with private school in some countries, but not in the UK and several others
- Non-state sector, or private sector – organizations (and by extension, the sector of the economy) not operated by the state but by private parties, for profit or non-profit activities
- Non-state transfers – transactions of weapons or other regulatorily-controlled goods (material or non-material) where neither party involved is a state
- Non-state market-driven regulation or NSMD regulation – effects by non-state actors (typically corporations under pressure from non-profit organizations) to regulate – without state legal involvement – the negative environmental and/or social impact of the production of consumer goods
- Stateless society - a society not governed by a state.

== See also ==
- Non-governmental organization
