= Shchuchy =

Shchuchy (Russian: Щу́чий; masculine), Shchuchya (Щу́чья; feminine), or Shchuchye (Щу́чье; neuter) is the name of several inhabited localities in Russia.

Urban localities

- Shchuchye, Shchuchansky District, Kurgan Oblast, a town in Shchuchansky District of Kurgan Oblast

Rural localities

- Shchuchy, Volgograd Oblast, a khutor in Kletskoye Rural Settlement of Sredneakhtubinsky District of Volgograd Oblast
- Shchuchya, a village in Dubrovinsky Rural Okrug of Yarkovsky District of Tyumen Oblast
- Shchuchye, Bryansk Oblast, a settlement in Ryabchovsky Selsoviet of Trubchevsky District of Bryansk Oblast
- Shchuchye, Mishkinsky District, Kurgan Oblast, a village in Voskhodsky Selsoviet of Mishkinsky District of Kurgan Oblast
- Shchuchye, Vargashinsky District, Kurgan Oblast, a village in Popovsky Selsoviet of Vargashinsky District of Kurgan Oblast
- Shchuchye, Yurgamyshsky District, Kurgan Oblast, a village in Malobelovsky Selsoviet of Yurgamyshsky District of Kurgan Oblast
- Shchuchye, Omsk Oblast, a settlement in Alexeyevsky Rural Okrug of Lyubinsky District of Omsk Oblast
- Shchuchye, Oryol Oblast, a village in Maslovsky Selsoviet of Orlovsky District of Oryol Oblast
- Shchuchye, Tula Oblast, a selo in Prudishchinsky Rural Okrug of Venyovsky District of Tula Oblast
- Shchuchye, Ostashkovsky District, Tver Oblast, a village in Ostashkovsky District, Tver Oblast
- Shchuchye, Zharkovsky District, Tver Oblast, a village in Zharkovsky District, Tver Oblast
- Shchuchye, Tyumen Oblast, a village in Zavodoukovsky District of Tyumen Oblast
- Shchuchye, Ertilsky District, Voronezh Oblast, a selo in Shchuchinskoye Rural Settlement of Ertilsky District of Voronezh Oblast
- Shchuchye, Liskinsky District, Voronezh Oblast, a selo in Shchuchenskoye Rural Settlement of Liskinsky District of Voronezh Oblast
- Shchuchye, Yamalo-Nenets Autonomous Okrug, a settlement in Priuralsky District of Yamalo-Nenets Autonomous Okrug

Other meanings

- Shchuchye (lake), located next to Shchuchinsk, Kazakhstan
- Shchuchy Range, Chukotka
