= Chemical weapon proliferation =

Prevalence and spread of chemical weapons

Many nations continue to research and/or stockpile chemical weapon agents despite numerous efforts to reduce or eliminate them. Most states have joined the Chemical Weapons Convention (CWC), which required the destruction of all chemical weapons by 2012. Twelve nations have declared chemical weapons production facilities and six nations have declared stockpiles of chemical weapons. All of the declared production facilities have been destroyed or converted for civilian use after the treaty went into force.

== CWC states with declared stockpiles ==
Of the 193 nations that have signed the CWC, states listed below have also declared stockpiles and agreed to monitored disposal and verification.

- Iraq
- Japan
- Libya
- Russia
- Syria
- United States

In some cases, chemical weapons were used in conflict such as the Iran–Iraq War and Syrian civil war. Both military targets and civilian populations have been affected.

== Details by state ==
=== Albania ===
Albania, as a party of the Chemical Weapons Convention, declared a stockpile of 16 tons of chemical weapons in 2007. On July 11, 2007, with the help of the U.S. government's Nunn–Lugar Cooperative Threat Reduction program, the Ministry of Defence announced the successful destruction of the entire stockpile.

=== Angola ===
Angola has been accused of using chemical weapons in its civil war.

=== China ===
According to the testimony from Assistant Secretary of State for Intelligence and Research Carl W. Ford before the Senate Committee on Foreign Relations, it is very probable that China has an advanced chemical warfare program. This includes research and development, production, and weaponization capabilities. The United States is concerned by China's contact and willingness to share chemical weapons expertise with other states of proliferating concern, including Syria and Iran. Chinese government did declare that they had a small arsenal of chemical weapons in the past but that it was destroyed before the ratifying convention. They declared only two former chemical production facilities that may have produced mustard gas and Lewisite.

=== Cuba ===
According to a United Nations finding, that cited suspicious residue affecting plant and animal life during the Cuban intervention in Angola, sarin and VX was used against Angolan militants by the Cuban Army.

=== Egypt ===
Egypt did not sign the Chemical Weapons Convention and has been appearing on various lists as having an offensive chemical weapons capability and is thought to have production facilities for sarin, VX, mustard gas and phosgene. Before the Egypt–Israel peace treaty of 1979, the country played a pivotal role exporting chemical weapons and related technologies to other Arab countries. It is possible that Egypt may still have limited stockpiles of chemical bombs, rockets and shells.

There are numerous reasons for this belief:

- Egypt is known to have used mustard gas in the Yemen civil war from 1963 to 1967.
- In the 1970s, Syria got their first chemical weapons from Egypt during the Yom Kippur War, but they were never used in this conflict.
- In the 1980s, Egypt supplied Iraq with mustard gas and nerve agents as well as related production and deployment technology.

In testimony before the Subcommittee on Seapower: Strategic and Critical Materials in 1991, US Navy Rear Admiral Thomas Brooks cited this evidence in identifying Egypt as a "probable" country to have chemical weapons.

Recent analyses are more careful estimating the current status of a chemical weapons program in Egypt. Only one facility has been identified as "likely involved" in the offensive activities. Although the offensive program may be still in existence, it does not seem that Egypt has a considerable stockpile of operational weapons.

=== Ethiopia ===
In 1991 Rear Admiral Thomas Brooks identified Ethiopia before the Congress as a "probability" to have chemical weapons possession. Ethiopia did ratify the CWC in 1996 and did not declare an offensive chemical weapons program. Since then, no evidence has been presented to contradict this statement.

=== India ===
On January 14, 1993, India became one of the original nations to sign the CWC. India declared its stock of chemical weapons in June 1997 which included 1,044 tonnes of sulfur mustard in its possession.

In 2005, of the six nations that declared stockpiles of chemical weapons, India was the only one to meet their deadline for the destruction of chemical weapons and inspection of its facilities by the OPCW. By the end of 2006, India had destroyed more than 75 percent of its chemical weapons and material stockpile. They were granted an extension to destroy the remainder by April 2009. On May 14, 2009, India informed the United Nations that it had completely destroyed its stockpile of chemical weapons.

=== Iran ===
Near the end of the Iran–Iraq War, Iran was suspected to have made limited use of chemical weapons in response to multiple chemical attacks by Iraq. The delivery vehicles Iran supposedly had in their possession included artillery shells, mortars, rockets and aerial bombs.

According to the Center for Strategic and International Studies, a Washington D.C.–based think tank, Iran currently has at least two major facilities for the research and production of chemical weapons. Iran began their production of nerve agents no later than 1994. The accuracy of these claims has not been verified.

Iran signed the Chemical Weapons Convention on January 13, 1993, and ratified it on November 3, 1997. They deny allegations of having a clandestine CW program in violation of CWC. In the official declaration submitted to OPCW, the Iranian government admitted that it produced mustard gas in 1980s but ceased the offensive program and destroyed stockpiles of operational weapons after the end of the war with Iraq.

=== Iraq ===
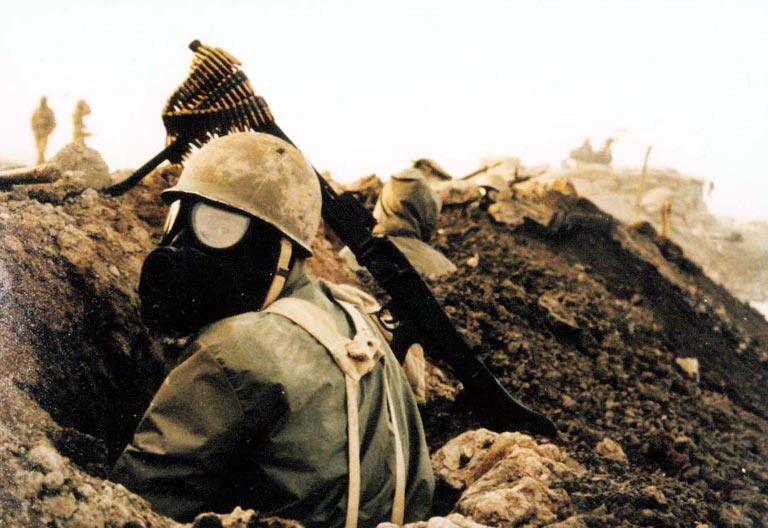
An Iranian soldier wearing a gas mask during the Iran–Iraq War. Iraq massively used chemical weapons during the war.

Well before Operation Desert Storm or the U.N. inspections that followed it, Iraq had already begun to build chemical weapons. After launching a research effort in the 1970s, Iraq was able to use chemical weapons in their war against Iran and to kill large numbers of their own Kurdish population in the 1980s. On June 28, 1987, in Sardasht, during two separate attacks on four residential areas, an estimated as 10 civilians were killed and 650 civilians injured. Iraq used an excessive amount of chemical weapons during Iran–Iraq War. Kurdish people were victims of chemical weapons. Iraq used mustard gas in an attack against Kurdish people on March 16, 1988, during the Halabja chemical attack. The attack killed between 3,200 and 5,000 people and injured 7,000 to 10,000 more, most of them civilians. During Iraqi chemical attacks against Iran, many Iranian military forces were killed by nerve agents. At the time, the attacks were actively supported by the United States.

During the first Gulf War, there were fears that Iraq would launch chemical-tipped missiles at its neighbors, particularly Israel, but Iraq refrained for fear of U.S. retaliation. During Operation Iraqi Freedom, coalition troops again feared they might be hit with chemical weapons, though this did not happen.

In 1991, as part of the 1991 Gulf War ceasefire agreement, the United Nations passed Resolution 687 that established the Special Commission (UNSCOM). The UNSCOM was charged with the task of destroying, removing or rendering harmless "all chemical and biological weapons and all stocks of agents and all related subsystems and components and all research, development, support and manufacturing facilities."

By the time UNSCOM left Iraq in December 1998, it had destroyed a large portion of Iraq's chemical weapon potential. UNSCOM had overseen the destruction or incapacitation of more than 88,000 filled or unfilled chemical munitions, over 600 tons of weaponized or bulk chemical agents, 4,000 tons of precursor chemicals, 980 pieces of key production equipment and 300 pieces of analytical equipment. Notwithstanding these achievements, the uncertainties regarding Iraq's possession of chemical weapons, their precursors and munitions remain.

The Organisation for the Prohibition of Chemical Weapons that oversee destruction measures, announced that "The government of Iraq has deposited their accession to the Chemical Weapons Convention with the Secretary General of the United Nations and within 30 days, on 12 February 2009, will become the 186th State to the Convention". Iraq also declared stockpiles of CW. Because of their recent accession, will be the only State Party exempted from the destruction time-line. On September 7, 2011, Hoshyar Zebari entered the OPCW headquarters, becoming the first Iraqi Foreign Minister to officially visit since the country joined the CWC.

=== Israel ===
In 2015, Israel signed but did not ratify the Chemical Weapons Convention. According to the Russian Federation Foreign Intelligence Service, Israel has significant stores of chemical weapons they manufactured themselves. They have a highly developed chemical and petrochemical industry, skilled specialists and stocks of source material. They are capable of producing several nerve, blister and incapacitating weapons. A 2005 report from the Swedish Defence Research Agency concluded that Israel was probably not actively producing "traditional" chemical weapons but might have a functional stockpile of previously produced material. Assessment of Israeli chemical weapons capabilities were redacted from declassified U.S. documents.

Although Israel did sign the CWC, it has not ratified the treaty and therefore is not officially bound by its provisions. Beliefs are that Israel has a significant stockpile of chemical weapons, likely to be the most abundant in the Middle-East according to the Russian Foreign Intelligence Service. A 1983 CIA report stated that Israel, after "finding itself surrounded by front-line Arab states with budding chemical weapon capabilities, became increasingly conscious of its vulnerability to chemical attack ... undertook a program of chemical warfare preparations in both offensive and protective areas ... In late 1982, a probable CW nerve agent production facility and a storage facility were identified at the Dimona Sensitive Storage Area in the Negev Desert. Other CW agent production is believed to exist within a well-developed Israeli chemical industry."

In 1974, in a hearing before the U.S. Senate Armed Services Committee, General Almquist stated that Israel had an offensive chemical weapons capability.

In 1992, El Al Flight 1862 bound for Tel Aviv crashed outside Amsterdam. During the course of the crash investigation, fifty gallons of dimethyl methylphosphonate was found in the plane's cargo. Dimethyl methylphosphonate is a CWC schedule 2 chemical that can be used in the production of the nerve agent sarin. The dimethyl methylphosphonate was bound for the Israel Institute for Biological Research in Ness Ziona, a top-secret military installation outside Tel Aviv. The facility was also responsible for producing the poison used in a September 1997 assassination attempt on a leader of the Palestinian militant organization Hamas (Khaled Mashal). According to Israeli officials, the substance was destined for defensive research purposes, to test filters for gas masks. This shipment came from a US chemical plant to the IIBR under a US Department of Commerce license.

The 1993 the U.S. Congress Office of Technology Assessment WMD proliferation assessment recorded Israel as a country known to have undeclared offensive chemical warfare capabilities.

In October 1998, the London Sunday Times reported that Israeli F-16 fighters were equipped to carry chemical weapons and that their crews have been trained on the use of such weapons.

=== Japan ===
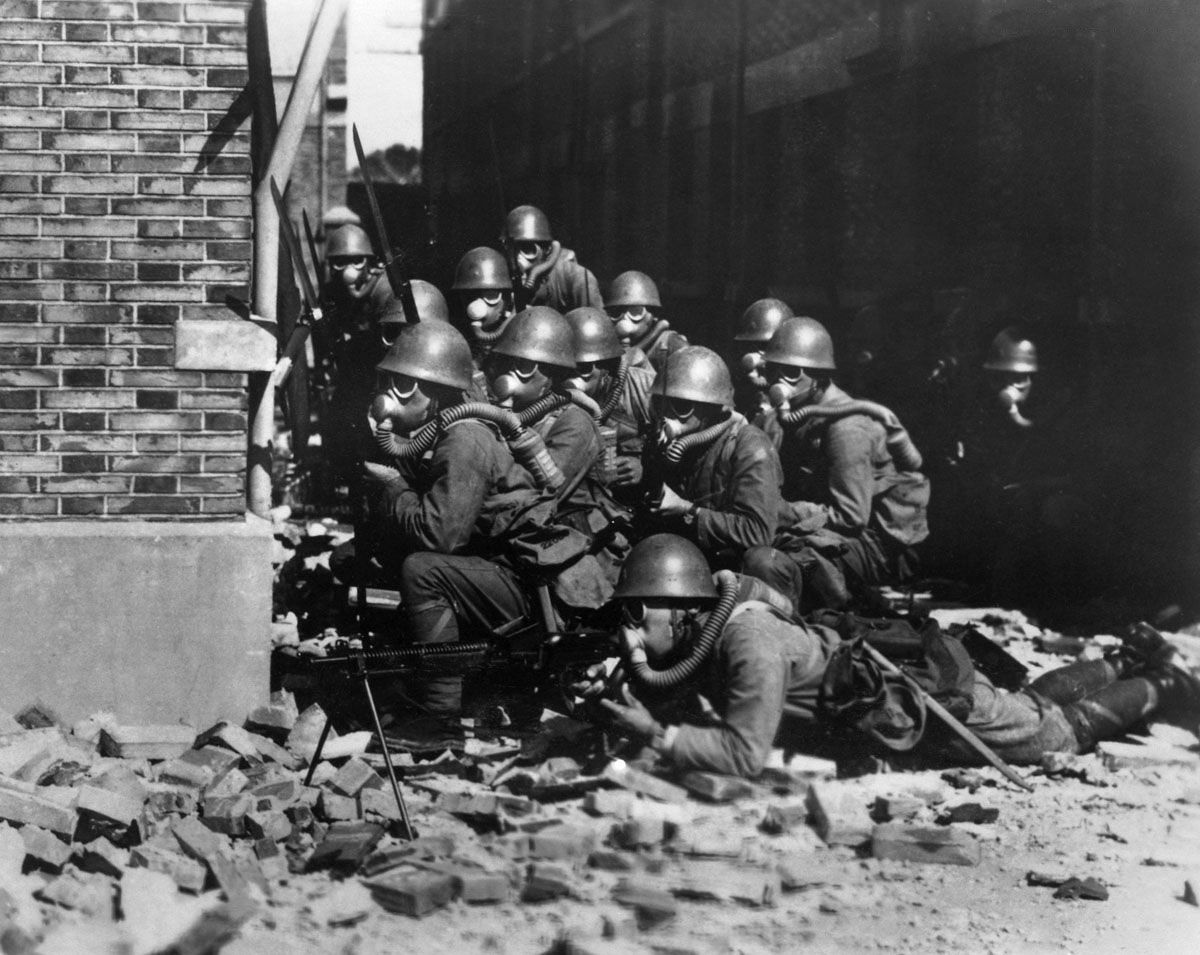
Japanese Special Naval Landing Forces wearing gas masks and rubber gloves during a chemical attack near Zhabei in the Battle of Shanghai.

Japan both used and stored chemical weapons on the territory of mainland China between 1937 and 1945. They left approximately two million tons of chemical weapons in China at the end of the war. The weapons mostly contained a mustard gas-lewisite mixture. They are classified as abandoned chemical weapons under the CWC. The destruction of the weapons under a joint Japan-China program started in September 2010, in Nanjing using mobile destruction facilities.

During December 1993, Japan signed the Chemical Weapons Convention and ratified the CWC in 1995. The JSDF does have chemical weapon facilities and samples to use in the development of protection against chemical weapons. The JGSDF Central NBC protection Troop admitted having samples of sarin in 1995.

=== Libya ===
Libya produced limited quantities of chemical weapons during the 1980s and is known to have used these weapons in combat at least once when they attempted to use chemical weapons against Chadian troops in 1987.

Since then, Libya constructed what is believed to be the largest chemical weapon production facility in the developing world in the Rabta industrial complex. This facility was the cornerstone of the Libyan CW program and has produced mustard gas, sarin, and phosgene since production began in the late 1980s. In March 1990 a suspicious fire broke out there following accusations by the United States.

Strict United Nations sanctions from 1992 to 1999 rendered Rabta inactive.

Libya used chemical weapons, under Muammar Gaddafi's regime, in a war with Chad. In 2003, Gaddafi agreed to accede to the CWC in exchange for "rapprochement" with western nations. At the time of the Libyan uprising against Gaddafi, Libya still controlled approximately 11.25 tons of poisonous mustard gas. Because of destabilization, concerns increased regarding possibilities and likelihood that control of these agents could be lost. With terrorism at the core of concern, international bodies cooperated to ensure Libya is held to its obligations under the treaty. Libya's post-Gaddafi National Transitional Council is cooperating with the Organisation for the Prohibition of Chemical Weapons regarding the destruction of all legacy chemical weapons in the country. After assessing the chemical stockpiles, the Libyan government will receive a deadline from the OPCW to destroy the CW.

Libya's chemical program was completely abandoned on December 19, 2003, along with their other weapons of mass destruction programs as part of a program to get sanctions lifted and normalize relations with foreign governments. In 2004, between 27 February and 3 March, Libya destroyed 3,200 chemical weapon artillery shells under supervision of the Organisation for the Prohibition of Chemical Weapons (OPCW). On 5 March 2004, Libya declared a stockpile of 23 tons of mustard gas as well as precursors for sarin and other chemicals. Libya officially acceded to the Chemical Weapons Convention in June 2004.

On 12 January 2018, the United States acknowledged that Libya has destroyed its remaining chemical weapons stockpile.

=== Myanmar ===
Intelligence regarding Myanmar's chemical weapon status is mixed, and sometimes contradictory. In the late 1990s, US naval intelligence identified Myanmar (then referred to as Burma) as developing chemical weapons capabilities. Later, other officials contradicted that statement, claiming that the evidence supporting Burma's chemical stockpile development was primarily based upon circumstantial evidence.

In July 2014 five journalists in Myanmar were sentenced to ten years in jail after publishing a report saying Myanmar was planning to build a new chemical weapons plant on farmland in the country's Magwe Region.

At an annual OPCW conference in 2019, the United States claimed Myanmar maintained a stockpile of chemical weapons dating to 1982. In November 2023, amidst a civil war, rebel groups of the Brotherhood Alliance accused the military of using chemical weapons on its forces multiple times in Shan State townships. In early December 2024, the Arakan Army made similar allegations in Chin State. The military denied all of these accusations.

Myanmar signed the Chemical Weapons Convention on 14 January 1993, and ratified the agreement on 8 July 2015. The convention entered into effect 7 August 2015.

=== North Korea ===
North Korea did not sign the CWC and is believed to have maintained an extensive chemical weapons program since the mid-1950s. The program includes research, production, stockpiling and weaponisation of large quantities of chemical agents (perhaps as many as 5,000 tons), including blister, nerve, choking, psychochemical incapacitant, vomiting and riot control agents. Several dozen facilities have been identified as likely involved in the offensive program. The production capability of these facilities is estimated as 4,500 tons of chemical agents per year. North Korean armed forces also have large quantities of delivery systems that could carry chemical warheads, including different artillery systems, aerial bombs, mines, tactical ballistic missiles (SCUD), and long-range ballistic missiles (Nodong and Taepodong-2 systems). The technological advancement of this program is uncertain, and some sources doubt whether North Korea is able to produce large quantities of nerve agents or fit the chemical warheads on its long-range ballistic missiles.

It reportedly acquired the technology necessary to produce tabun and mustard gas as early as the 1950s. In 2009, the International Crisis Group reported that the consensus expert view was that North Korea had a stockpile of about 2,500 to 5,000 tonnes of chemical weapons, including mustard gas, sarin (GB) and other nerve agents including VX.

=== Pakistan ===
Since the 1970s and 1980s, Pakistan had been suspected of running a possible military chemical weapons program both by the Soviet Union and the United States. In 1991, Rear Admiral Thomas Brooks identified Pakistan as a "probable" chemical weapons possessor in testimony before Congress. In 1992, India and Pakistan signed a bilateral arms control treaty of chemical weapons that requires both countries to make a commitment to not develop, possess or use chemical weapons.

On January 13, 1993, Pakistan became an original signatory of Chemical Weapons Convention (CWC), and ratified the treaty on November 27, 1997. Since being its signatory, Pakistan is not known to have ever possessed a militarized chemical weapons program, and is a member in good standing of the Organisation for the Prohibition of Chemical Weapons (OPCW). Despite its good standing, Pakistan has been accused of covertly running a military chemical weapons program– the accusations have primarily been made by India since 1970s. The Indian assertion was said to be primarily based on the import of toxic chemicals and metals and an assumption of absence of their use in the civilian biochemical industry.

In 1999, Pakistan, addressing the Indian allegations at the United Nations, announced a mandate and regulation for all domestic chemical producers to "furnish details of the chemicals" imported or used in Pakistan.

=== Russia ===
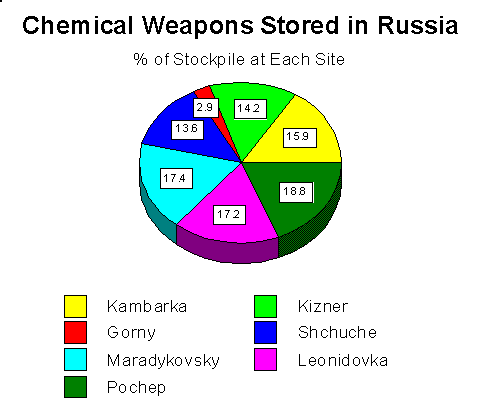
Chemical weapons formerly stored in Russia.

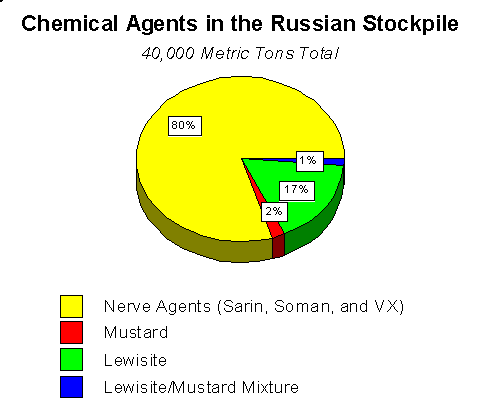
Former Russian CW stockpiles.

Russia entered the CWC with the largest declared stockpile of chemical weapons in the world. By 2010 the country had destroyed 18,241 tonnes at destruction facilities located in Gorny (Saratov Oblast) and Kambarka (Udmurt Republic), where operations have finished and Shchuchye (Kurgan Oblast), Maradykovsky (Kirov Oblast), Leonidovka, Bessonovsky District (Penza Oblast) while installations are under construction in Pochep (Bryansk Oblast) and Kizner (Udmurt Republic). By 2016, Russia destroyed around 94% of its chemical weapons and planned to completely destroy its remaining stockpile by the end of 2018. On September 27, 2017, Russia announced the destruction of the last batch of chemical weapons, completing the total destruction of its chemical arsenal ahead of schedule.

On March 4, 2018, Russia was alleged to have conducted a chemical attack in Salisbury, England, that left five injured including the alleged target of the attack, Sergei Skripal.

Russia destroyed about 25,000 metric tons of chemical weapons, or 62 percent of its 40,000-ton stockpile as of April 29, 2012 – the deadline set by the Chemical Weapons Convention for complete arsenal destruction. Russia expected 2020 to be more realistic but according to Russia, they fully destroyed their arsenal weapons on September 27, 2017.

Since 2022, Russia is being reported using chemical warfare (agents such as chloropicrin) on regular basis, during their invasion of Ukraine. As Ukrainian military stated, 4,800 incidents involving chemical weapons against Ukrainian forces and 3 deaths were recorded as of December 2024.

=== Serbia and Montenegro ===
The former Yugoslavia is known to have produced a variety of chemical weapons (CW). The majority of stockpiled CW is believed to have been inherited by its successor, Serbia.

Reports indicate that the former Yugoslavia's Army produced large quantities of sarin (50 tons), sulfur mustard, phosgene, the incapacitant BZ (allegedly a stockpile of 300 tons) and tear gas. At least four chemical warfare production facilities have been identified in Serbia: Prva Iskra in Baric; Miloje Blagojevic in Lucani; and Milojie Zakic and Merima in Krusevac. While the Trajal plant in Krusevac has been shut down, serious questions exist about accounting and previous production and storage of chemical materials there, as well as the lack of accounting on the other three sites.

Yugoslavia used its CW technologies to develop chemical munitions for Iraq prior to the first Gulf War in the "Little Hawk" program and chemical munitions for the Orkan MLRS system under the "KOL15" program.

The former Yugoslavia signed the Geneva Protocol in 1929. In April 2000, the Federal Republic of Yugoslavia acceded to the Chemical Weapons Convention (CWC).

=== South Korea ===
Prior to 1997, South Korea was strongly suspected of possessing an active chemical weapons program and was identified as a "probable" chemical weapons possessor by the United States.

On April 18, 1997, South Korea signed the Chemical Weapons Convention and made a secret declaration. It is thought that South Korea is the "state party" referred to in Chemical Weapons Convention materials. There are reports that South Korea is operating a secret facility in Yeongdong County, Chungcheongbuk-do Province for the destruction of chemical agents.

=== South Sudan ===
In February 2016, the Sudan People's Liberation Movement-in-Opposition accused the South Sudanese government of attacking them with chemical weapons during the South Sudanese Civil War that was underway at the time.

=== Sudan ===
Some past reports of uncertain credibility indicated that Sudan may have used chemical weapons against the rebels in the southern part of this country. Sudan accessed to CWC in 1999 and did not declare any offensive CW program. U.S. Department of State claims that it lacks sufficient evidence to determine whether Sudan is engaged in activities prohibited by CWC.

=== Syria ===
Prior to September 2013, Syria was one of seven states not to party with the Chemical Weapons Convention. As a party to the 1925 Geneva Protocol, it was prohibited from using chemical weapons in war yet unhindered in their production, storage and transfer.

When questioned about the topic, Syrian officials stated that they feel it is an appropriate deterrent against Israel's undeclared nuclear weapons program which they believe exists. On July 23, 2012, the Syrian government acknowledged, for the first time, that it had chemical weapons.

Independent assessments indicate that Syria could have produced up to a few hundred tons of chemical agent per year. Syria reportedly manufactures the unitary agents: Sarin, Tabun, VX, and mustard gas.

Syrian chemical weapons production facilities have been identified by Western nonproliferation experts at the following 5 sites, plus a suspected weapons base:

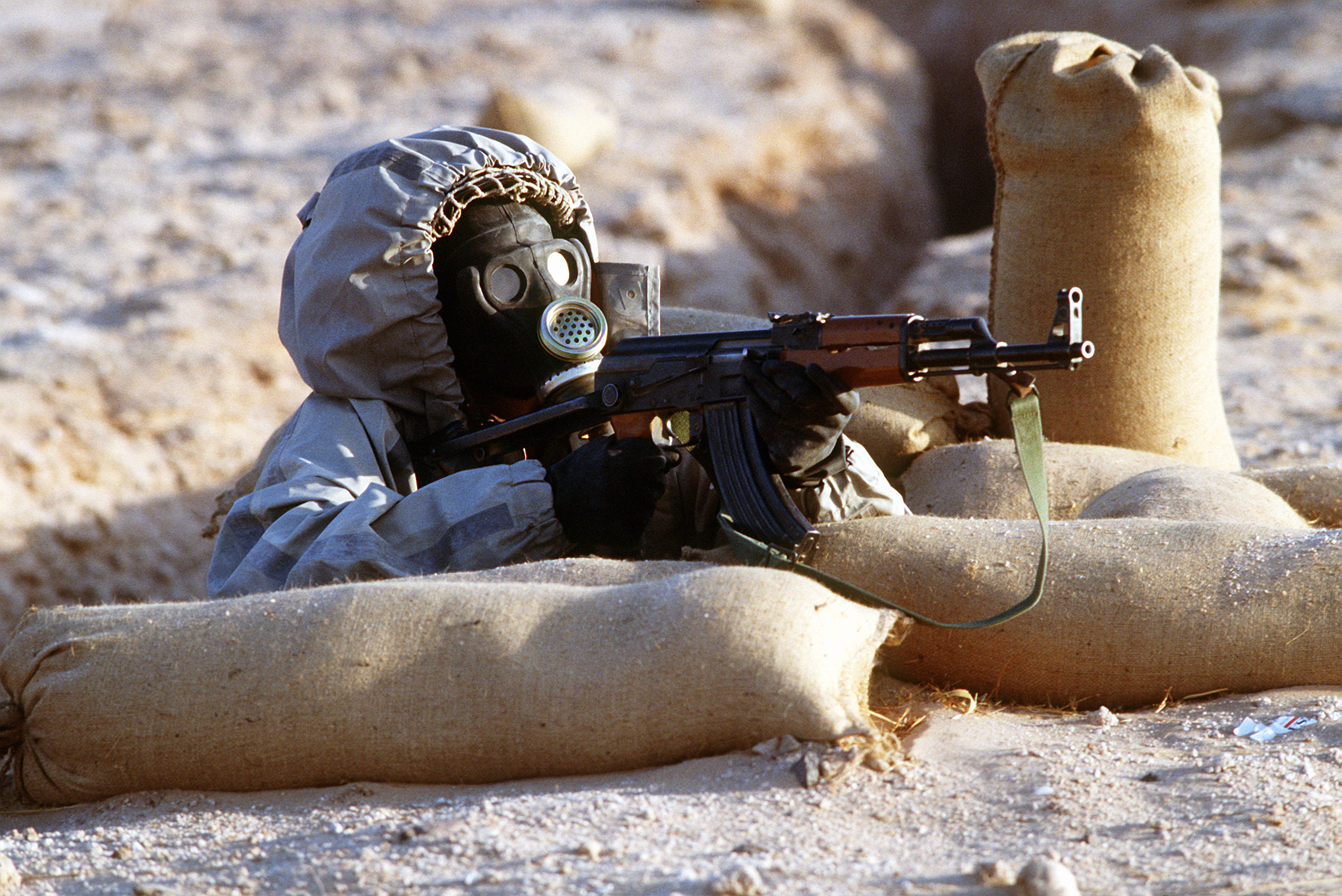
A Syrian soldier aims a Type 56 assault rifle wearing a Soviet-made, model ShMS nuclear–biological–chemical warfare mask.

- Al Safir (Scud missile base)
- Cerin
- Hama
- Homs
- Latakia
- Palmyra

In July 2007, a Syrian arms depot exploded, killing at least 15 Syrians. Jane's Defence Weekly, a UK magazine reporting on military and corporate affairs, believed that the explosion happened when Iranian and Syrian military personnel attempted to fit a Scud missile with a mustard gas warhead. Syria stated that the blast was accidental and not chemical related.

On July 13, 2012, the Syrian government moved its stockpile to an undisclosed location.

In September 2012, information emerged that the Syrian military had begun testing chemical weapons and was reinforcing and resupplying a base housing these weapons located east of Aleppo in August.

On March 19, 2013, news emerged from Syria indicating the first use of chemical weapons since the beginning of the Syrian uprising.

On August 21, 2013, testimony and photographic evidence emerged from Syria indicating a large-scale chemical weapons attack on Ghouta, a populated urban center.

An agreement was reached September 14, 2013, called the Framework For Elimination of Syrian Chemical Weapons, leading to the elimination of Syria's chemical weapon stockpiles by mid-2014.

On October 14, 2013, Syria officially acceded to the Chemical Weapons Convention.

On September 14, 2013, the United States and Russia announced an agreement that would lead to the elimination of Syria's chemical weapon stockpiles by mid-2014. Syria officially acceded to the CWC on October 14, but has yet to sign the Comprehensive Test Ban Treaty. It is believed Syria first received chemical weapons in 1973 from Egypt in the form of artillery shells. Since then it is thought Syria has one of the most advanced chemical weapons programs in the Middle East.

On December 9, 2024, the Israeli Air Force launched strikes on Syrian chemical weapon facilities following the collapse of the Assad regime. Israeli officials stated they launched the strikes in order to prevent the weapons from falling into the hands of Islamic terrorists. Following the strikes, the United States said that it was working with other middle eastern countries to destroy the remaining weapons.

Syria's chemical arsenal

Syria is thought to have amassed large quantities of sarin, tabun, and mustard and is currently weaponizing VX. Exact quantities are hard to know although the CIA has estimated Syria possesses several hundred liters of chemical weapons with hundreds of tons of agents produced annually.

Production

Syria has four main production sites. One just north of Damascus, one near Homs, one in Hama and one, al-Safir south-east of Aleppo.

=== Taiwan ===
U.S. Congress was informed in 1989 that Taiwan could have acquired offensive chemical weapons capability, including stockpiles of sarin. The alleged facilities include Tsishan and Kuanhsi. Taiwanese authorities acknowledged only the existence of a defensive research program.

=== Turkey ===
Turkey emerged from the cold war relatively unprotected and is gravely concerned about the acquisition of weapons of mass destruction, particularly chemical weapons that have been used in the vicinity of the Turkish state. Turkey is party to both the Chemical Weapons Convention since 1997 and the Biological Weapons Convention since 1974.

Turkey has been accused of using chemical weapons in Afrin against Kurdish rebels, but the country has denied that civilians in its operation against the Kurdish YPG fighters in northwestern Syria were affected by chemical weapons from the Turkish military. The country has sharply condemned and verified some of the chemical weapons used in the Syrian civil war.

=== United States ===
The United States has used multiple types of chemical weapons both in war and in testing. For example, testing of how various chemical weapons will disperse in different climates and delivery systems during Operation LAC. Police forces use CS against violent protests domestically, while use and deployment is banned in military use. The United States possessed a stockpile of chemical weapons since World War I. It banned the production or transport of chemical weapons in 1969. The U.S. began chemical weapons disposal and destruction in the 1960s, first by deep-sea burial; by the 1970s, incineration was the primary disposal method used. The use of chemical weapons was officially renounced in 1991, and the U.S. signed the Chemical Weapons Convention in 1993. As of July 7, 2023, the remaining stockpiles of sulfur mustard were announced to be destroyed.

The United States has completed destruction of the chemical weapons stockpile it declared in 1997, guided by RCRA regulations. As of 2023 complete destruction and deactivation was achieved on July 7, 2023.

Official policy now reflects the likelihood of chemical weapons being used as a terrorist weapon.

== See also ==
- Weapon of mass destruction
- Commission on the Prevention of WMD proliferation and terrorism
- Chemical Weapons Convention
- Ten Threats identified by United Nations

== Resources ==
- National Counterproliferation Center – Office of the Director of National Intelligence
- Economist. (May 2, 1997). "Chemical Weapons. Just Checking," The Economist 347, p. 42.
- Mahnaimi, Uzi (October 1998). "Israeli Jets Equipped for Chemical Warfare". London Sunday Times
- Monterey Institute of International Studies. (April 9, 2002). "Chemical and Biological Weapons: Possession and Programs Past and Present". Retrieved Dec. 21, 2004.
- Senate Armed Services Committee, FY 1975 "Authorization Hearing", Part 5, March 7, 1974
- Shoham, Dany (Spring–Summer 1998). "Chemical and Biological Weapons in Egypt". The Nonproliferation Review 5 (3): 48–58. doi:10.1080/10736709808436720 ISSN 1073-6700
- Stockholm International Peace Research Institute's research on disarmament, arms control and non-proliferation: "SIPRI's research on disarmament, arms control and non-proliferation". Stockholm International Peace Research Institute. Archived from the original on 2014-12-29.
- Russian Biological and Chemical Weapons, a useful page about non-state transfers of weapons, with links to information from CRS, the GAO and NGOs.
