= High-level Panel on Threats, Challenges and Change =

United Nations panel

The United Nations' High-level Panel on Threats, Challenges and Change was created in 2003 to analyse threats and challenges to international peace and security, and to recommend action based on this analysis. It was chaired by former Prime Minister of Thailand, Anand Panyarachun, and its members included former United States National Security Advisor, Brent Scowcroft, as well as several former heads of government and foreign ministers as members.

In December 2004, it produced a report on threats to peace and security.

== Ten threats ==
In its 2004 report, the Panel identified ten threats:

1. Poverty
2. Infectious disease
3. Environmental degradation
4. Inter-state war
5. Civil war
6. Genocide
7. Other atrocities (e.g., trade in women and children for sexual slavery, or kidnapping for body parts)
8. Weapons of mass destruction (nuclear proliferation, chemical weapon proliferation, biological weapon proliferation)
9. Terrorism
10. Transnational organized crime

== See also ==
- Biosecurity
- Bioterrorism
