= Searchina =

Japanese news company

Searchina is a Japanese company predominantly involved in business information and news distribution relating to China. The corporate name is a portmanteau of "search" and "China".

== History ==
Masakazu Motoki (端木正和, as known in Japan), originally from Fujian Province in China, left a trading company he was working for in Japan and opened a news portal site on June 4, 1998, with the name "China Intelligence Bureau", the former company of Searchina. Searchina Co., Ltd. was established on September 1, 1999. In July 2008, the 10th anniversary of the site opening, the site name was also changed from the former name "China Intelligence Bureau" to "Searchina", to match with the corporate name. Searchina contracts with China News Service, a news agency of the Chinese Communist Party's United Front Work Department, for news distribution. Searchina also had a joint venture with Xinhua News Agency's China Securities Journal. The site is known as one of the biggest China information sites in Japan, covering the Chinese economy and Chinese stocks. It monitors wealthy Chinese individuals and consumers in Shanghai for internet research and promotion. The company played important roles in the Japanese market for 2008 Beijing Olympic Games and Shanghai World Expo. In recognition of those exchanges between Japan and China, a Chinese governmental organization awarded Searchina, along with Toyota, OMRON, Panasonic and KYOCERA "Outstanding Contribution Award for Promoting China-Japan Newspaper Exchanges" (Association of China-Japan Newspaper Business Promotion). In April 2009, Searchina entered into a tie-up with Dow Jones Japan in order to jointly extend information service offering to Japanese financial business operators. In February 2010, SBI Group acquired Searchina.
