= Shchuchy, Volgograd Oblast =

Shchuchy Щучий
- Khutor
- Location within Volgograd Oblast Location within Russia
- Coordinates: 48°34′N 44°41′E
- Country: Russia
- Region: Volgograd Oblast
- District: Sredneakhtubinsky District
- Time zone: UTC+4:00

Shchuchy (Russian: Щучий) is a rural locality (a khutor) in Kletskoye Rural Settlement, Sredneakhtubinsky District, Volgograd Oblast, Russia. The population was 239 as of 2010. There are 13 streets.

== Geography ==
Shchuchy is located 33 km southwest of Srednyaya Akhtuba (the district's administrative centre) by road. Plamenka is the nearest rural locality.
