= Shchuchye, Ertilsky District, Voronezh Oblast =

Shchuchye Щучье
- Selo
- Location within Voronezh Oblast Location within Russia
- Coordinates: 51°45′N 40°29′E
- Country: Russia
- Region: Voronezh Oblast
- District: Ertilsky District
- Time zone: UTC+3:00

Shchuchye (Russian: Щучье) is a rural locality (a selo) and the administrative center of Shchuchinskoye Rural Settlement, Ertilsky District, Voronezh Oblast, Russia. The population was 1,306 as of 2010. There are 10 streets.

== Geography ==
Shchuchye is located on the right bank of the Bityug River, 27 km WSW of Ertil (the district's administrative centre) by road. Shchuchinskiye Peski is the nearest rural locality.
