= Non-state transfers =

In arms sales and black market activities, non-state transfers are transactions of weapons or other goods - material or non-material - where neither party involved is a government. This is in contrast to the usual practice of arms sales, where a government purchases arms from another government or from private industry. This is also in contrast to situations where a government may provide arms to a non-state actor, such as a separatist movement or terrorists.

Examples of non-state transfers could include theft from the military of a sovereign state, sale by a private individual of government goods which do not legally belong to him, and a variety of other black market activities.

Many attempts at international arms control, such as the Chemical Weapons Convention, Biological Weapons Convention, and the Australia Group, are premised on the notion that one or both parties involved will be state actors. Thus, non-state transfers represent a generally unaddressed area of concern regarding weapons proliferation.
