= All Russia (movement) =

Former political movement in Russia

All Russia Вся Россия
- Chairman: Vladimir Yakovlev
- Chairman of the Executive Committee: Oleg Morozov
- Founders: Mintimer Shaimiev; Murtaza Rakhimov; Ruslan Aushev; Vladimir Yakovlev and others
- Founded: 22 May 1999
- Dissolved: 8 February 2002
- Split from: Our Home – Russia
- Merged into: United Russia
- Ideology: Centrism; Regionalism; Federalism
- Political position: Centre
- National affiliation: Fatherland – All Russia (1999–2001); Unity (2000–2001)
- Colours: Rainbow

Website
- www.all-russia.ru

The All Russia (Russian: Вся Россия, romanized: Vsya Rossiya, can also be translated as All of Russia or Whole Russia) was a Russian federalist socio-political movement founded by governors of federal subjects of Russia. The movement became a co-founder of the Fatherland – All Russia bloc and then of United Russia party.

== History ==
=== All Russia bloc ===
The initiative group for the creation of the Socio-Political Bloc "All Russia" was formed in April 1999 and consisted of many regional heads: President of Tatarstan Mintimer Shaimiev, President of Bashkortostan Murtaza Rakhimov, President of Ingushetia Ruslan Aushev, President of Adygea Aslan Dzharimov, President of North Ossetia Alexander Dzasokhov, Governor of St. Petersburg Vladimir Yakovlev, Governor of Irkutsk Oblast Boris Govorin, Chairman of the State Council of Tatarstan Farid Mukhametshin, Governor of Khabarovsk Krai Viktor Ishayev, Governor of Perm Oblast Gennady Igumnov, Head of the Administration of Astrakhan Oblast Anatoly Guzhvin, Governor of Omsk Oblast Leonid Polezhayev, President of Chuvashia Nikolay Fyodorov, Governor of Chelyabinsk Oblast Pyotr Sumin, Head of the Administration of Khanty–Mansi Autonomous Okrug Alexander Filipenko, Chairman of the Khanty-Mansiysk Duma Sergei Sobyanin, Mayor of Kogalym Alexander Gavrin, head of the Kostroma city administration Boris Korobov. The initiative group also included the leaders of the Regions of Russia movement and the Russian Regions (RR) State Duma group, Vladimir Medvedev and Oleg Morozov, a number of State Duma deputies (mainly from the RR group), the leader of the For Civil Dignity movement, Ella Pamfilova, co-chairman of the For Equality and Justice movement, Boris Agapov, and others. The bloc was founded after the internal collapse of the Our Home – Russia movement, with some members of the bloc (such as Murtaza Rakhimov, Gennady Igumnov, Aslan Dzharimov) being members of the NDR at the time of the creation of All Russia.

On 22 April 1999, the first meeting of the organizing committee for the creation of the All Russia bloc was held at the President Hotel, with the participation of Shaimiev, Rakhimov, Aushev and Yakovlev. The co-founders of the new bloc included the State Duma Russian Regions State duma group (led by Oleg Morozov), the Regions of Russia movement (led by Vladimir Medvedev), and the For Equality and Justice movement (led by Ruslan Aushev and Boris Agapov).

On 22 May 1999, the founding congress of the All Russia bloc was held in Saint Petersburg, the official founders of which were the movements "For Equality and Justice" and "Regions of Russia". A political council of the bloc was formed, which included 10 heads of regions (Aushev, Govorin, Guzhvin, Ishayev, Polezhayev, Rakhimov, Sumin, Filipenko, Shaimiev, Yakovlev), 7 heads of regional parliaments, two mayors, leaders of the "Regions of Russia" (RR) movement and several State Duma deputies of the RR group. The congress elected the presidium of the political council of 18 people, and the executive committee of the political council (consisted of 21 people + all heads of regional headquarters). Oleg Morozov was elected chairman of the executive committee of the political council.

In April-August 1999, All Russia negotiated an alliance with Moscow Mayor Yury Luzhkov's Fatherland movement. On 4 August, an agreement was finally reached, and a single Coordination Council of the Fatherland – All Russia (OVR) coalition was created, with Oleg Morozov as secretary. On 17 August 1999, the creation of the Fatherland – All Russia (OVR) bloc was officially announced, with Yevgeny Primakov, Yury Luzhkov and Vladimir Yakovlev as its leaders. Vladimir Medvedev from All Russia became the first deputy of the OVR united election headquarters.

=== All Russia movement ===
At the congress on 21 August 1999, All Russia was transformed into a political movement, and Vladimir Yakovlev was elected its chairman. The congress also approved the creation of a single bloc with Fatherland, and approved preliminary lists of candidates for the 1999 State Duma election. On 10 September the list was certified by the Central Election Commission and registered on 9 October. Vladimir Yakovlev became third on the OVR list, after Primakov and Luzhkov, and many governors (such as Shaimiev, Rakhimov, Aushev) were not included in the list.

Following the 1999 legislative election, the Fatherland – All Russia bloc became the third largest faction after the CPRF and the Unity.

=== Creation of the United Russia ===
In January 2000, the All Russia movement announced its support for the candidacy of acting President Vladimir Putin in the snap presidential election.

On 27 May 2000, the All Russia movement joined the newly formed Unity party, founded on the basis of the Unity movement.

On 13 October 2001, the second and final congress of the All Russia movement took place, where a decision was made to join the alliance of Unity and Fatherland parties, which were then in the process of forming a party. All Russia set the condition for its joining that the name of the party, which was planned to be called "Unity and Fatherland", should include the words "All" and "Russia" in the name. T

On 27 October 2001, at the congress of the Unity and Fatherland alliance, "All Russia" was accepted into the alliance.

On 1 December 2001, Unity, Fatherland, and All Russia united to form the "Unity and Fatherland – United Russia" party. All Russia member Mintimer Shaimiev was elected co-chairman of the party's Supreme Council.

On 8 February 2002, the All Russia movement ceased its activities and dissolved itself, finally joining United Russia.

== Ideology ==
The All Russia movement described its ideology as "democratic federalism." The movement has also been described as "nomenklatura centrist."
