= 1999 Russian legislative election =

- 19 December 1999

All 450 seats in the State Duma 226 seats needed for a majority
- Turnout: 61.85% (▼2.53 pp)
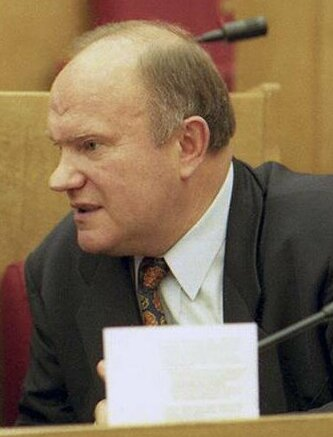

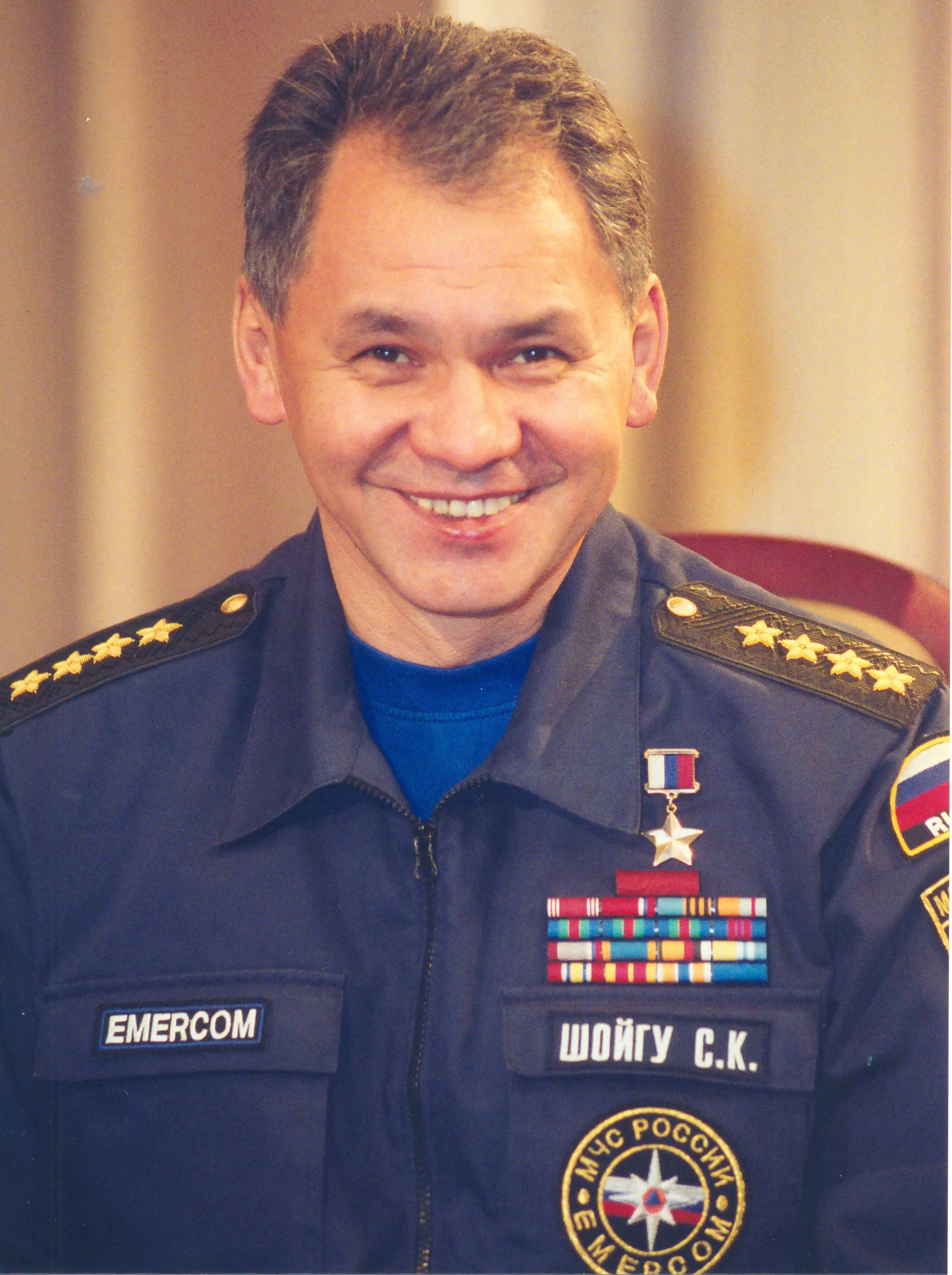

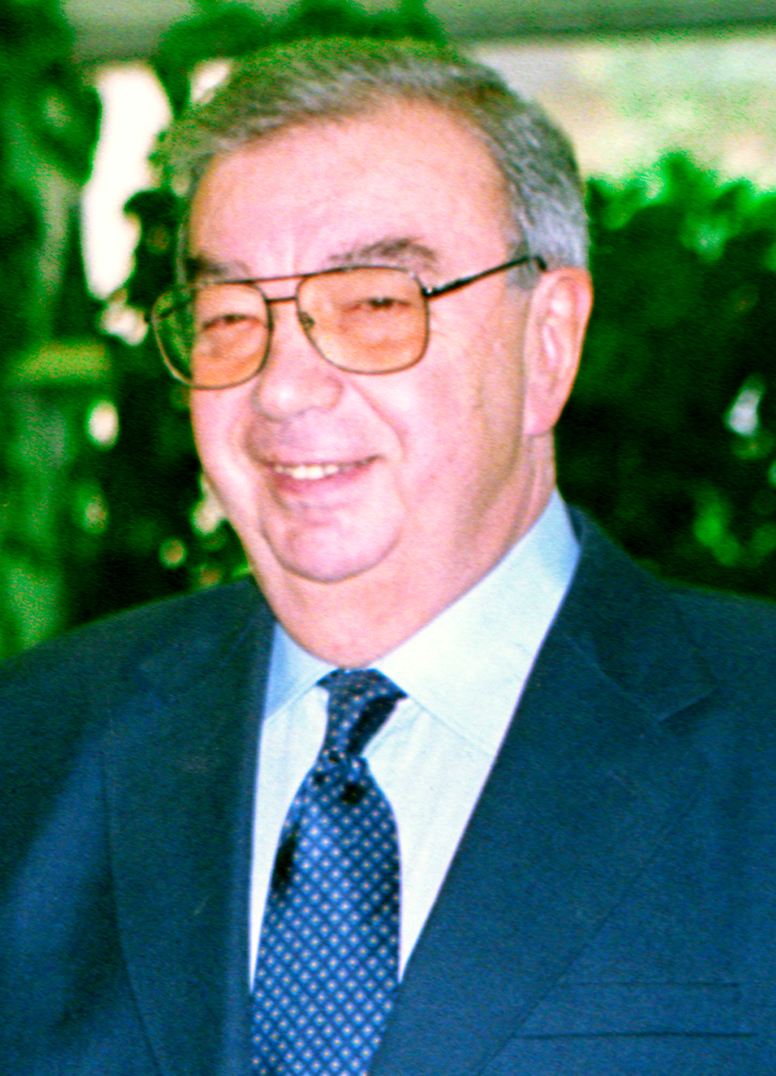

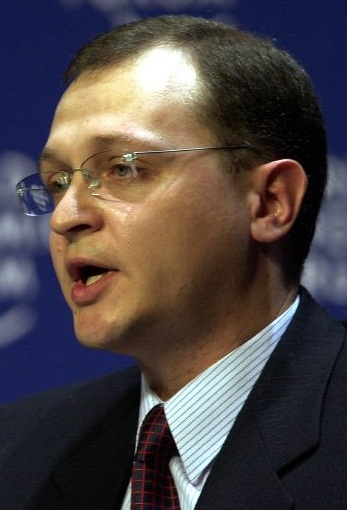

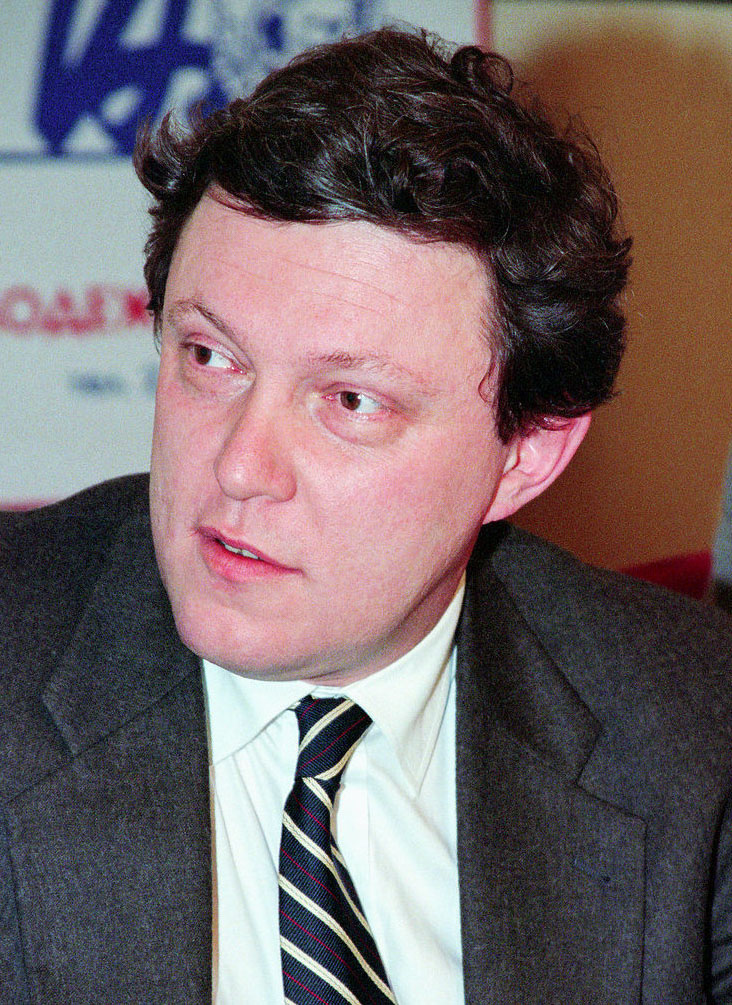

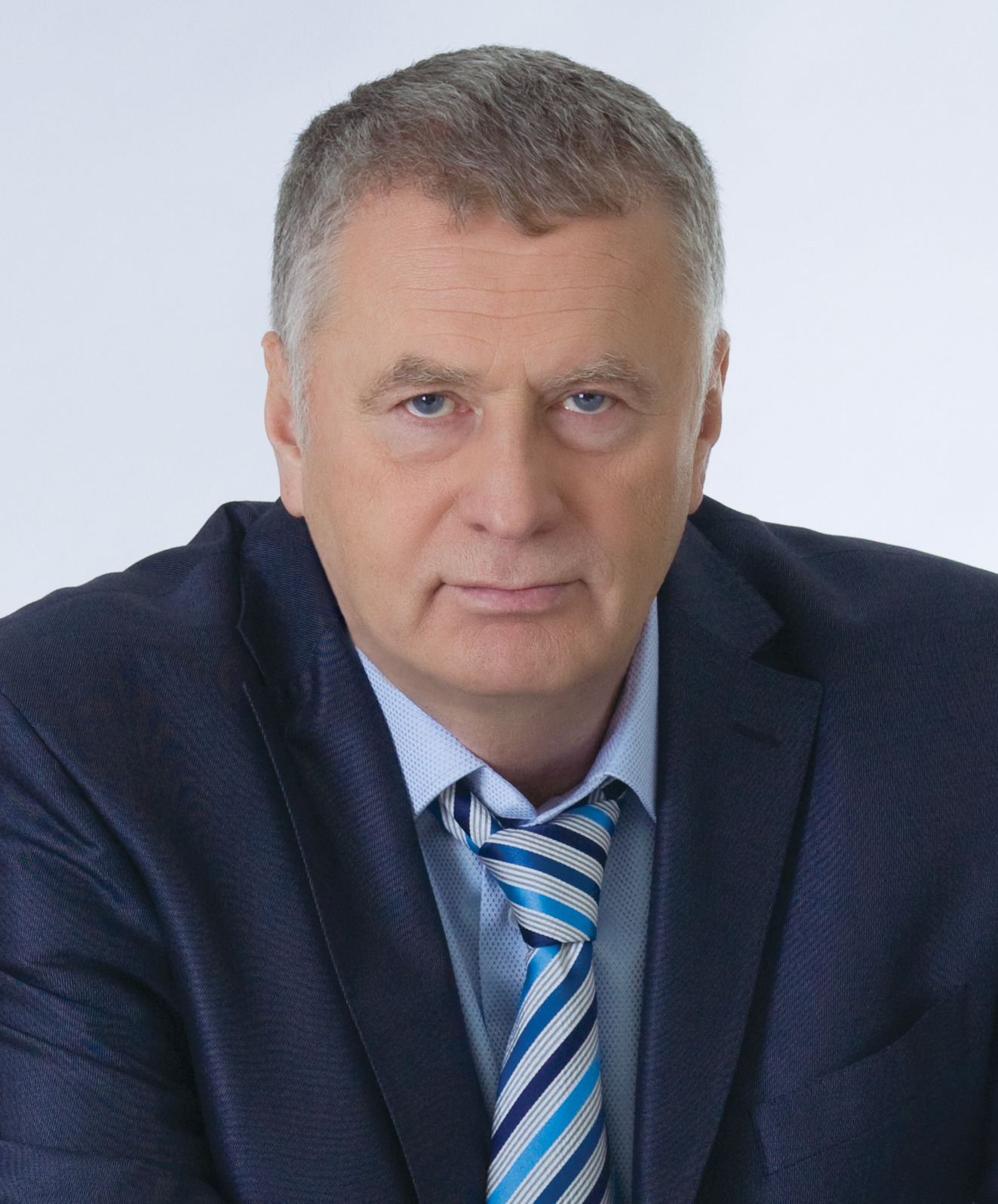

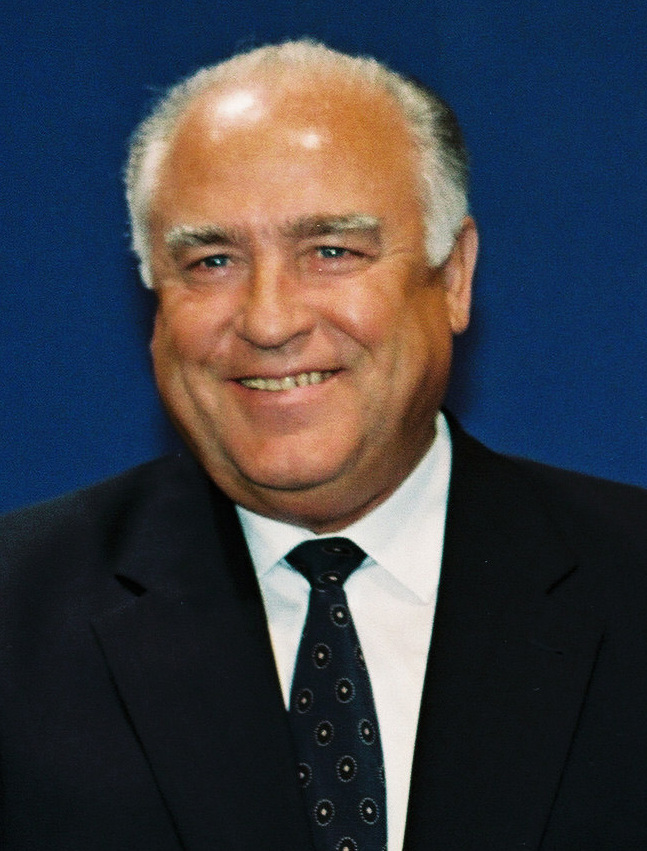

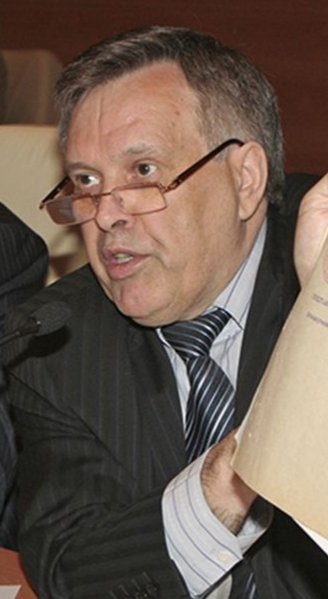

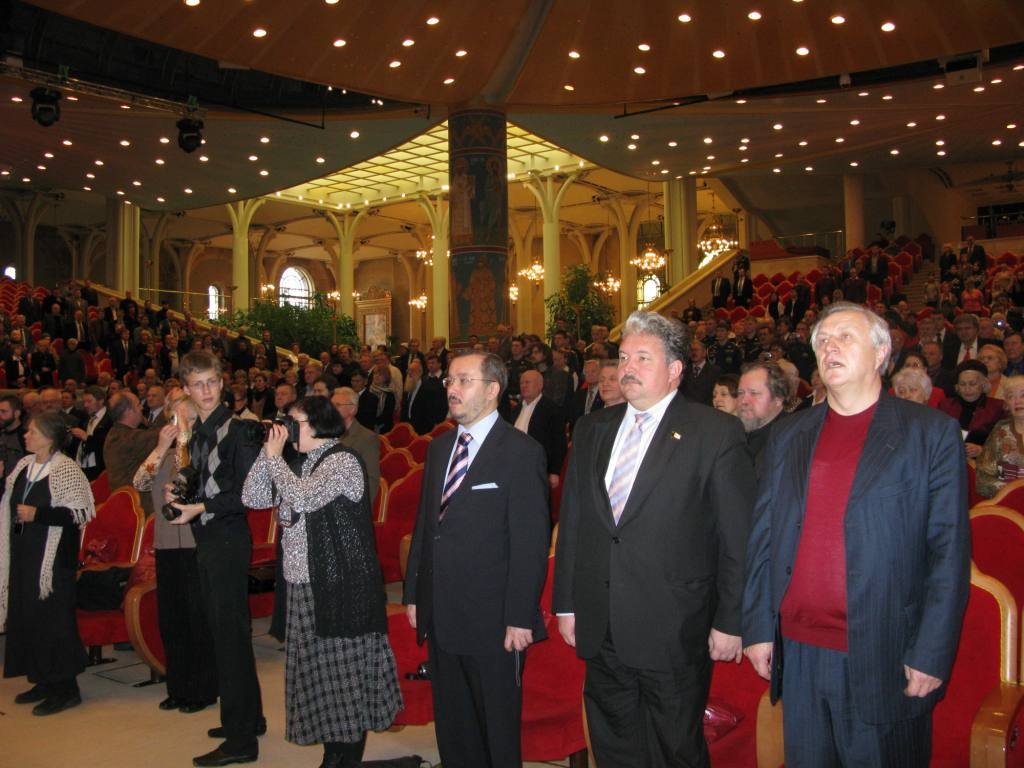
| | First party | Second party | Third party |
|---|---|---|---|
| Leader | Gennady Zyuganov | Sergei Shoigu | Yevgeny Primakov |
| Party | CPRF | Unity | OVR |
| Leader since | 14 February 1993 | 3 October 1999 | 21 August 1999 |
| Leader's seat | Federal list | Federal list (Note: Refused to take his seat) | Federal list |
| Last election | 157 seats, 22.30% | New | New |
| Seats won | 113 | 73 | 68 |
| Seat change | ▼44 | New | New |
| Popular vote | 16,195,569 | 15,548,707 | 8,886,697 |
| Percentage | 24.29% (Note: Party list vote) | 23.32% | 13.33% |
| Swing | ▲1.99% | New | New |
| | Fourth party | Fifth party | Sixth party |
| Leader | Sergey Kiriyenko | Grigory Yavlinsky | Vladimir Zhirinovsky |
| Party | SPS | Yabloko | Zhirinovsky Bloc |
| Leader since | 24 August 1999 | 16 October 1993 | 13 December 1989 |
| Leader's seat | Federal list | Federal list | Federal list |
| Last election | New | 45 seats, 6.89% | 51 seats, 11.18% |
| Seats won | 29 | 20 | 17 |
| Seat change | New | ▼25 | ▼34 |
| Popular vote | 5,676,982 | 3,955,457 | 3,989,932 |
| Percentage | 8.52% | 5.93% | 5.98% |
| Swing | New | ▼0.96% | ▼5.20% |
| | Seventh party | Eighth party | Ninth party |
| Leader | Viktor Chernomyrdin | Viktor Ilyukhin | Sergey Baburin |
| Party | NDR | DPA | ROS |
| Leader since | 12 May 1995 | 8 July 1998 | 21 December 1991 |
| Leader's seat | Yamalo-Nenets | Pervomaysky | Omsk Central (lost) |
| Last election | 55 seats, 10.13% | New | 5 seats (inside V–N) |
| Seats won | 7 | 2 | 2 |
| Seat change | ▼48 | New | ▼3 |
| Popular vote | 791,160 | 384,392 | 245,266 |
| Percentage | 1.19% | 0.58% | 0.37% |
| Swing | ▼8.94% | New | – |
Chairman of the State Duma before election
Gennadiy Seleznyov
CPRF
Elected Chairman of the State Duma
Gennadiy Seleznyov
CPRF

Legislative elections were held in Russia on 19 December 1999 to elect the 450 seats in the State Duma, the lower house of the Federal Assembly. Like in the previous elections in 1995, the electoral system resulted in many parties competing for the proportional seats and a significant number of independent deputies elected.

The Communist Party of the Russian Federation experienced major losses in the election, and for the first time since the dissolution of the Soviet Union a solid majority emerged in the State Duma that supported economic reforms towards a market economy. The result was favorable for President Boris Yeltsin and solidified the popularity of Prime Minister Vladimir Putin ahead of the 2000 presidential election. Although the Communists still had the largest number of seats, the Unity party, endorsed by Putin, was in a close second. The Fatherland - All Russia bloc of former prime minister Yevgeny Primakov and Moscow mayor Yuri Luzhkov was in third place, followed by the Union of Right Forces, led by former prime minister Sergey Kiriyenko. Several small parties also won seats.

== Background ==
Initially the Fatherland bloc, which was led by Yevgeny Primakov and Yuri Luzhkov, and was critical of President Boris Yeltsin, was leading in the polls for most of 1999. Primakov was popular because of his tenure as the prime minister from 1998 until the spring of 1999, before his dismissal by Yeltsin. However, after Vladimir Putin was appointed prime minister in August 1999, he experienced a meteoric rise in popularity due to his response to the war in the North Caucasus and improving economic conditions from higher oil prices. Putin endorsed the pro-government Unity party led by Sergei Shoigu on 24 November 1999. It also received the endorsement of Aman Tuleyev, the Communist governor of Kemerovo Oblast. By early December, Unity surpassed the Fatherland bloc in the polls and was in second place after the Communists, whose support was declining compared to previous elections.

== Electoral system ==
According to the 1993 electoral law, 225 members of the house were allocated proportionally, using nationwide party lists, via the Hare method with a 5% threshold, while the other 225 members were elected in single-member constituencies, using first past the post system.

To secure a place on the ballot, parties had to have registered with the Russian Ministry of Justice one year before the election (instead of six months in previous elections). As an alternative to gathering 200,000 signatures, they had the option of paying a deposit of just over two million rubles, returnable if the party won at least 3% of the list vote. In order to increase proportionality, the law provided that if parties reaching the five per cent threshold got in total 50% or less of the vote, parties with at least 3% of the vote would also win seats by declining numbers of votes up to the point at which the total share of vote exceeded 50%. However, if after this procedure the parties winning seats still had less than 50% of the vote, the election was to be deemed invalid. In the single-member district ballots, if votes cast against all exceeded the votes of each candidate, a repeat election had to be held within four months. As a result, repeat elections had to be held in eight districts. Finally, as an alternative to gathering signatures in support of their nomination, single-member district candidates were also given the option of paying a deposit of 83,490 rubles, returnable if they won at least 5% of the district vote.

== Political parties and blocs ==
| No. (Note: Positions 4 and 24 were allocated to Savior movement ("Spas") and Ecological Party "Kedr", which were later disqualified.) | Electoral association or bloc | Abbr. | Lead candidates | Political position | Ideology |
|---|---|---|---|---|---|
| 1 | Conservative Movement of Russia | KDR | Lev Ubozhko • Vladimir Burenin • Andrey Tishkov | Centre-right to right-wing | Conservatism / Anti-communism |
| 2 | Russian All-People's Union | ROS | Sergey Baburin • Nikolay Leonov • Nikolay Pavlov | Right-wing | Conservatism / Right-wing populism |
| 3 | Women of Russia | ZhR | Alevtina Fedulova • Galina Karelova • Nina Veselova | Centre | Feminism / Pacifism / Welfare state |
| 5 | Stalin Bloc – For the USSR; Labour Russia, Union of Officers, NPSM | | Viktor Anpilov • Yevgeny Dzhugashvili • Stanislav Terekhov | Far-left | Stalinism / Anti-revisionism / Soviet patriotism |
| 6 | Yabloko Association | Yabloko | Grigory Yavlinsky • Sergei Stepashin • Vladimir Lukin | Centre | Social liberalism / Reformism |
| 7 | Communists and Workers of Russia – for the Soviet Union; RKRP, K–TR, SR | K–TR | Viktor Tyulkin • Anatoly Kryuchkov • Vladislav Aseyev | Far-left | Communism / Anti-revisionism |
| 8 | Peace, Labour, May; Industrial Union, Native Fatherland | May | Alexander Burkov • Valery Trushnikov • Alexander Tatarkin | Centre-left | Left-wing populism |
| 9 | Andrei Nikolayev and Svyatoslav Fyodorov Bloc; SNT, PST, SPT, Union of Realists | | Andrei Nikolayev • Svyatoslav Fyodorov • Tatyana Malyutina | Centre-left | Democratic socialism / Social democracy |
| 10 | Spiritual Heritage | DN | Alexey Podberezkin • Pyotr Proskurin • Valery Vorotnikov | Right-wing | Statism / Collectivism |
| 11 | Congress of Russian Communities and Yury Boldyrev Movement; KRO, Interethnic Union | KRO | Yury Boldyrev • Dmitry Rogozin • Viktor Glukhikh | Right-wing | Right-wing populism / National conservatism |
| 12 | Party of Peace and Unity | PME | Sazhi Umalatova • Viktor Stepanov • Nikolay Antoshkin | Left-wing | Communism / Internationalism / Soviet patriotism |
| 13 | Russian Party for the Protection of Women | RPZZh | Tatyana Roshchina • Zhanna Makhova • Irina Kremenets | Centre | Social liberalism / Feminism |
| 14 | Interregional Movement "Unity"; NPPR, My Family, SPSMSB, PS, DPND, RHDP, Prosperity | MeDvEd | Sergei Shoigu • Alexander Karelin • Alexander Gurov | Centre-right | Social conservatism / Populism |
| 15 | Social Democrats | SD | none | Left-wing | Social democracy |
| 16 | All-Russian Political Movement in Support of the Army | DPA | Viktor Ilyukhin • Albert Makashov • Yury Savelyev | Far-left | Militarism / Soviet patriotism |
| 17 | Zhirinovsky Bloc; PDVR, RSSM | LDPR | Vladimir Zhirinovsky • Oleg Finko • Yegor Solomatin | Right-wing | Right-wing populism / Russian nationalism / Unitarism |
| 18 | For Civil Dignity | ZGD | Ella Pamfilova • Alexander Dondukov • Anatoly Shkirko | Centre | Liberalism / Human rights protection |
| 19 | Fatherland – All Russia; Fatherland, All Russia, APR | OVR | Yevgeny Primakov • Yury Luzhkov • Vladimir Yakovlev | Centre to centre-left | Social liberalism / Civic nationalism |
| 20 | Communist Party of the Russian Federation | CPRF | Gennady Zyuganov • Gennady Seleznyov • Vasily Starodubtsev | Left-wing | Socialism / Left-wing populism / Left-wing nationalism |
| 21 | Patriotic Forces Movement – Russian Cause; ROD, Union of Compatriots "Fatherland", Christian Rebirth | RD | Oleg Ivanov • Yury Petrov • Mikhail Sidorov | Right-wing | National conservatism |
| 22 | All-Russian Political Party of the People | VPPN | Anzor Aksentyev-Kikalishvili • Tatyana Bure • Vladimir Shainsky | Centre-left | Populism / Social liberalism |
| 23 | Union of Right Forces; DVR, New Force, Young Russia, Lawyers for Human Rights | SPS | Sergey Kiriyenko • Boris Nemtsov • Irina Khakamada | Centre-right to right-wing | Conservative liberalism / Neoliberalism / Atlanticism |
| 25 | Our Home – Russia | NDR | Viktor Chernomyrdin • Vladimir Ryzhkov • Dmitry Ayatskov | Centre-right | Liberal conservatism |
| 26 | Socialist Party of Russia | SPR | Ivan Rybkin • Leonid Mayorov • Andrey Belishko | Left-wing | Social democracy |
| 27 | Party of Pensioners | RPP | Yakov Ryabov • Anatoly Kontashov • Rimma Markova | Centre | Pensioners interests |
| 28 | Russian Socialist Party | RSP | Vladimir Bryntsalov • Igor Bryntsalov • Yury Bryntsalov | Right-wing | Conservatism / Traditionalism |

=== Rejected lists ===
| Electoral association | Abbr. | Lead candidates | Political position | Ideology | Notes |
|---|---|---|---|---|---|
| Liberal Democratic Party of Russia | LDPR | Vladimir Zhirinovsky • Anatoly Bykov • Mikhail Musatov | Right-wing | Right-wing populism / Russian nationalism / Unitarism | On 11 October 1999 the CEC rejected the federal party list due to inaccurate data about the candidates, including LDPR's no.2 Anatoly Bykov who was wanted on suspicion of money laundering. |
| Savior | Spas | Alexander Barkashov • Vladimir Davidenko • Dmitry Belik | Far-right | Russian nationalism / Antisemitism / Anti-immigrant sentiment | Affiliated with the Russian National Unity, Savior movement was registered with the CEC on 2 November 1999 and received ballot number 4. It was disqualified from the election on 25 November after some of its regional chapters were found existing only on paper. |
| Ecological Party of Russia "Kedr" | KEDR | Anatoly Panfilov • Vladimir Petrov • Ivan Okhlobystin | Centre | Green politics | Registered with the CEC on 3 November 1999, receiving ballot number 24. Disqualified on 10 December after two of its top-three candidates withdrew from election. |
| Russian Party | RP | Vladimir Miloserdov • Galina Chubkova • Valery Luzgin | Far-right | Ultranationalism / Russian irredentism | Did not submit signatures to the CEC before deadline or pay an election deposit. |
| Russian Patriotic Popular Movement | RPND | Aleksandr Fyodorov • Aleksandr Kravchuk • Aleksey Vedenkin | Far-right | Russian nationalism | Did not submit signatures to the CEC before deadline or pay an election deposit. |
| Russian Conservative Party of Entrepreneurs | RKPP | Mikhail Toporkov • Yuri Antonov • Viktor Gokinayev | Right-wing | Conservatism | Registration denied after one of top-three candidates was recalled by the party. |

== Campaign ==
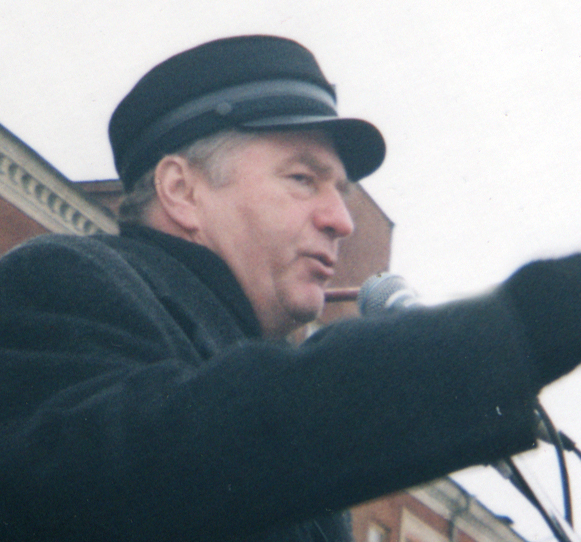
Liberal Democratic nominee Vladimir Zhirinovsky campaigning for his party

The early election campaign saw the initial surge in popularity of Fatherland-All Russia bloc, led by the Moscow mayor Yuri Luzhkov and the former Prime Minister Yevgeny Primakov, which tried to capitalize upon the perceived incapacity of President Boris Yeltsin and the weakness of his administration. The tide had turned on 9 August 1999 when Yeltsin designated Vladimir Putin as Prime Minister and his eventual successor. On 24 November, Putin announced that "as a citizen" he will support the recently formed pro-government bloc Interregional Movement "Unity", headed by General Sergei Shoigu, a member of all Russian governments since 1994.

== Opinion polls ==

| Polling firm | Fieldwork date | CPRF | Unity | OVR (Note: Fatherland before August 1999.) | SPS (Note: Right Cause coalition (Boris Nemtsov etc.) in February–March 1999 FOM polls, summary of Right Cause and New Force (Sergey Kiriyenko) in April–August 1999 FOM polls.) | LDPR | NDR | Yabloko | NRPR | Lead |
|---|---|---|---|---|---|---|---|---|---|---|
| VCIOM | 12 Dec | 24 | 21 | 12 | 7 | 4 | —N/a | 8 | —N/a | 3 |
| FOM | 12 Dec | 21 | 16 | 9 | 5 | 5 | 1 | 7 | —N/a | 5 |
| ROMIR | 10-12 Dec | 17 | 17 | 9 | 7 | 5 | —N/a | 7 | —N/a | Tie |
| ARPI | 10-12 Dec | 20.8 | 14.7 | 11.6 | 6.5 | 4.4 | —N/a | 9 | —N/a | 6.1 |
| FOM | 27–28 Nov | 21 | 14 | 10 | 4 | 4 | —N/a | 8 | —N/a | 7 |
| | 24 Nov | Vladimir Putin endorses Unity bloc | | | | | | | | |
| FOM | 20-21 Nov | 29.1 | 11.1 | 15.2 | 6.9 | 5.5 | 1.3 | 11.1 | —N/a | 10 |
| FOM | 13-14 Nov | 30.1 | 10.9 | 19.1 | 5.4 | 5.4 | 2.7 | 10.9 | —N/a | 8 |
| FOM | 6-7 Nov | 27.3 | 10.9 | 21.9 | 5.4 | 5.4 | 4.1 | 12.3 | —N/a | 4 |
| FOM | 30-31 Oct | 25.9 | 9.0 | 22.0 | 3.8 | 5.1 | 2.5 | 12.9 | —N/a | 3 |
| | 11 Oct | CEC forces LDPR to re-register as "Zhirinovsky Bloc" | | | | | | | | |
| ARPI | 4-10 Oct | 30 | —N/a | 25 | —N/a | 7 | 5 | 19 | —N/a | 5 |
| FOM | 18-19 Sep | 21 | —N/a | 29 | 2 | 3 | 2 | 10 | 4 | 8 |
| | 4–16 Sep | Russian apartment bombings | | | | | | | | |
| FOM | 4-5 Sep | 20 | —N/a | 23 | 2 | 5 | 1 | 12 | 4 | 3 |
| FOM | 21–22 Aug | 21 | —N/a | 27 | 3 | 5 | 1 | 8 | 4 | 6 |
| | 9 Aug | Vladimir Putin appointed prime minister | | | | | | | | |
| FOM | 24-25 Jul | 23 | —N/a | 15 | 5 | 6 | 2 | 11 | 5 | 8 |
| ROMIR | 5–15 Jul | 22.5 | —N/a | 13 | 3.2 | 4.7 | 3.9 | 13.5 | 2.6 | 9 |
| FOM | 26-27 Jun | 22 | —N/a | 15 | 3 | 6 | 2 | 11 | 5 | 7 |
| ROMIR | 5–15 Jun | 21.9 | —N/a | 17.2 | 5.7 | 4.9 | 3.7 | 12.2 | 7.6 | 4.7 |
| FOM | 29–30 May | 24 | —N/a | 16 | 2 | 7 | 2 | 13 | 5 | 8 |
| | 15 May | Impeachment attempt of Boris Yeltsin fails in the State Duma | | | | | | | | |
| | 12 May | Sergey Stepashin appointed prime minister | | | | | | | | |
| ROMIR | 5–15 May | 23.6 | —N/a | 13.5 | 1.3 | 5.4 | 3.2 | 13.4 | 4 | 10.1 |
| FOM | 24-25 Apr | 23 | —N/a | 13 | 3 | 5 | 3 | 15 | 4 | 8 |
| ROMIR | 5–15 Apr | 23.4 | —N/a | 11.3 | 3.6 | 6.6 | 3.4 | 15.7 | 6.1 | 7.7 |
| FOM | 27-28 Mar | 24 | —N/a | 13 | 2 | 5 | 2 | 14 | 5 | 10 |
| | 24 Mar | PM Primakov cancels visit to the US over Yugoslavia bombings | | | | | | | | |
| ROMIR | 5–15 Mar | 25.5 | —N/a | 9.6 | 0.9 | 5.2 | 2.2 | 13.7 | 4.4 | 11.8 |
| FOM | 27-28 Feb | 26 | —N/a | 16 | 3 | 4 | 2 | 11 | 5 | 10 |
| ROMIR | 5–15 Feb | 23.1 | —N/a | 10.6 | 1 | 4.7 | 2.3 | 11.9 | 5 | 11.2 |
| ROMIR | 5–15 Jan 1999 | 22.8 | —N/a | 13.6 | 0.9 | 3.7 | 2.5 | 13.3 | 4.5 | 9.2 |
| ROMIR | 5–15 Nov 1998 | 25.1 | —N/a | —N/a | 1.1 | 3.5 | 3.6 | 12.7 | 8.3 | 12.4 |
| FOM | 11 Oct 1997 | 21 | —N/a | —N/a | —N/a | 2 | 8 | 10 | —N/a | 11 |
| FOM | 23 Dec 1995 | 19 | —N/a | —N/a | —N/a | 8 | 8 | 7 | —N/a | 11 |
| 1995 election | 19 Dec 1995 | 22.3 | New | New | New | 11.2 | 10.1 | 6.9 | New | 11.1 |

== Results ==

| Party | Party-list | | | Constituency | | | Total seats | +/– |
| Party | Votes | % | Seats | Votes | % | Seats | Total seats | +/– |
|---|---|---|---|---|---|---|---|---|
| Communist Party | 16,196,024 | 24.78 | 67 | 8,893,547 | 13.71 | 46 | 113 | –44 |
| Unity | 15,549,182 | 23.79 | 64 | 1,408,801 | 2.17 | 9 | 73 | New |
| Fatherland – All Russia | 8,886,753 | 13.59 | 37 | 5,469,389 | 8.43 | 31 | 68 | New |
| Union of Right Forces | 5,677,247 | 8.68 | 24 | 2,016,294 | 3.11 | 5 | 29 | New |
| Zhirinovsky Bloc | 3,990,038 | 6.10 | 17 | 1,026,690 | 1.58 | 0 | 17 | –34 |
| Yabloko | 3,955,611 | 6.05 | 16 | 3,289,760 | 5.07 | 4 | 20 | –25 |
| Communists and Workers of Russia – for the Soviet Union | 1,481,890 | 2.27 | 0 | 439,770 | 0.68 | 0 | 0 | –1 |
| Women of Russia | 1,359,042 | 2.08 | 0 | 326,884 | 0.50 | 0 | 0 | –3 |
| Party of Pensioners | 1,298,971 | 1.99 | 0 | 480,087 | 0.74 | 1 | 1 | New |
| Our Home – Russia | 790,983 | 1.21 | 0 | 1,733,257 | 2.67 | 7 | 7 | –48 |
| Russian Party for the Protection of Women | 536,022 | 0.82 | 0 | | | | 0 | New |
| Congress of Russian Communities–Yury Boldyrev Movement | 405,298 | 0.62 | 0 | 461,069 | 0.71 | 1 | 1 | –4 |
| Stalin Bloc – For the USSR | 404,274 | 0.62 | 0 | 64,346 | 0.10 | 0 | 0 | New |
| For Civil Dignity | 402,754 | 0.62 | 0 | 147,611 | 0.23 | 0 | 0 | New |
| All-Russian Political Movement in Support of the Army | 384,404 | 0.59 | 0 | 466,176 | 0.72 | 2 | 2 | New |
| Peace, Labour, May | 383,332 | 0.59 | 0 | 126,418 | 0.19 | 0 | 0 | New |
| Andrei Nikolayev and Svyatoslav Fyodorov Bloc | 371,938 | 0.57 | 0 | 676,437 | 1.04 | 1 | 1 | New |
| Party of Peace and Unity | 247,041 | 0.38 | 0 | | | | 0 | New |
| Russian All-People's Union | 245,266 | 0.38 | 0 | 700,976 | 1.08 | 2 | 2 | –3 |
| Russian Socialist Party | 156,709 | 0.24 | 0 | 662,030 | 1.02 | 1 | 1 | New |
| Russian Cause | 111,802 | 0.17 | 0 | 1,846 | 0.00 | 0 | 0 | New |
| Conservative Movement of Russia | 87,658 | 0.13 | 0 | 125,926 | 0.19 | 0 | 0 | New |
| All-Russian People's Party | 69,695 | 0.11 | 0 | | | | 0 | New |
| All-Russian Socio-Political Movement "Spiritual Heritage" | 67,417 | 0.10 | 0 | 594,426 | 0.92 | 1 | 1 | New |
| Socialist Party of Russia | 61,689 | 0.09 | 0 | 30,085 | 0.05 | 0 | 0 | New |
| Social-Democrats of Russia | 50,948 | 0.08 | 0 | 18,618 | 0.03 | 0 | 0 | 0 |
| Russian Ecological Party "Kedr" | | | | 112,167 | 0.17 | 0 | 0 | 0 |
| Russian Patriotic Popular Movement | | | | 10,481 | 0.02 | 0 | 0 | New |
| Russian Party | | | | 7,918 | 0.01 | 0 | 0 | 0 |
| Russian Conservative Party of Entrepreneurs | | | | 2,647 | 0.00 | 0 | 0 | New |
| Independents | | | | 27,877,095 | 42.98 | 105 | 105 | +28 |
| Against all | 2,198,702 | 3.36 | – | 7,695,171 | 11.86 | 8 | 8 | – |
| Vacant seats | | | | | | 1 | 1 | – |
| Total | 65,370,690 | 100.00 | 225 | 64,865,922 | 100.00 | 225 | 450 | 0 |
| Valid votes | 65,370,690 | 98.05 | | 64,865,922 | 97.84 | | | |
| Invalid/blank votes | 1,296,992 | 1.95 | | 1,429,779 | 2.16 | | | |
| Total votes | 66,667,682 | 100.00 | | 66,295,701 | 100.00 | | | |
| Registered voters/turnout | 108,073,956 | 61.69 | | 108,073,956 | 61.34 | | | |
Source: Nohlen & Stöver, University of Essex
