= Andrei Kokoshin =

Russian politician

- Андрей Кокошин
- Kokoshin in 2012

Member of the State Duma
- In office 18 January 2000 – 21 December 2011

Secretary of the Security Council of Russia
- In office 3 March 1998 – 10 September 1998
- Preceded by: Ivan Rybkin
- Succeeded by: Nikolay Bordyuzha

First Deputy Minister of Defense
- In office 3 April 1992 – 28 August 1997
- Succeeded by: Nikolai Mikhailov

Personal details
- Born: 26 October 1945 (age 81) Moscow, Soviet Union
- Party: United Russia; Fatherland – All Russia
- Education: Bauman Moscow State Technical University

Military service
- Allegiance: Russia
- Branch/service: Russian Armed Forces

Andrei Afanasyevich Kokoshin (Russian: Андрей Афанасьевич Кокошин; born October 26, 1945) is a Soviet and Russian statesman, political scientist and historian, Americanist; Doctor of Historical Sciences, Professor, Full Member of the Russian Academy of Sciences; A full Member of the Russian Academy of Rocket and Artillery Sciences, he served as the secretary of the Security Council of Russia and as Deputy to the State Duma of the 3rd, 4th and 5th convocations. He holds the rank of 1st class Active State Councillor of the Russian Federation.

== Biography ==
Born on October 26, 1945 in Moscow to a family of a front-line officer and Victory Parade participant. He began his career as a turner in the Experimental Design Bureau of A. S. Yakovlev of the Ministry of Aviation Industry of the Soviet Union. In 1963, he graduated from the Secondary School for Working Youth with a gold medal. He is twice silver and once bronze medalist of the USSR youth championships in academic rowing and was a member of the USSR Olympic reserve team in academic rowing in 1965–1966. In the 1970s and 1980s, he played rugby for Moscow Lokomotiv. Winner of the Moscow Cup in rugby.

In 1969, he graduated from the instrument-making faculty of the Bauman Moscow State Technical University, specializing in "radio-electronic devices". In the 1980s, he was one of the experts involved in preparing disarmament treaties between the USA and the USSR.

In the 1980s, he conducted a series of interdisciplinary studies on the problems of ensuring reliable nuclear deterrence by the Soviet Armed Forces, taking into account the entire range of damaging factors of nuclear explosions, technical characteristics of offensive and defensive weapons, decision-making mechanisms on political-military and operational-strategic issues, etc. Together with General Vlaentin Larionov, he developed models for ensuring strategic stability at the level of general-purpose forces and conventional weapons, which became widely known in our country and abroad. In the 1980s, under the leadership of Vice President of the USSR Academy of Sciences, Evgeny Velikhov, who was in charge of defense issues at the Academy of Sciences, he was actively involved in developing problems of ensuring strategic stability, the concept and programs of an "asymmetric response" to the Strategic Defense Initiative (SDI) of U.S President Ronald Reagan. Velikhov, Kokoshin and their colleagues developed and substantiated a set of measures for comparatively less expensive means of the Soviet Union's response to the American SDI to ensure a general military-strategic balance between the USSR and the USA.

As deputy director of the Institute for US and Canadian Studies of the USSR Academy of Sciences, Kokoshin supervised, among other things, the laboratory of artificial intelligence and mathematical modelling, created by the decision of Velikhov. In this laboratory, under the leadership of Kokoshin, computer models of strategic stability were developed, which were soon transferred for further use to the General Staff of the Soviet Armed Forces.

In 1992-1996 he served as First Deputy Minister of Defense of the Russian Federation, in 1996-1997 he served as State Secretary and First Deputy Minister of Defense of Russia. One of the developers of the federal laws "On Defense", "On the State Defense Order" and "On Mobilization Preparation and Mobilization of the Russian Federation". Under Kokoshin's leadership, the first State Armaments Program of Russia was developed (approved by the Government of Russia in 1996).) He supervised the creation of the Iskander missile system, the Su-34 bomber, combat helicopters, the Borei-class strategic submarine missile carriers, the Topol-M missile system, the construction of the Pyotr Veleikiy battlecruiser, the creation of high-precision long-range weapons in conventional equipment, the Integration-SVT and Baget military electronics programs, etc.

From August 28, 1997, to March 3, 1998, he served as State Military Inspector, Secretary of the Defense Council of Russia. From March 3 to September 10, 1998, he served as Secretary of the Security Council of Russia. When appointing him to this post, Ilya Bulavinov and Maxim Zhukov wrote in Kommersant that "Kokoshin cannot be assigned to any Kremlin or government group". As Secretary of the Security Council of the Russian Federation, he developed and approved by Russian president Boris Yeltsin in the summer of 1998 the document "Concept of state policy on military construction until 2005", which concerned not only the Russian Ministry of Defense, but also other Russian security agencies. He supervised the preparation of decisions of the Security Council of Russia on issues of Russia's nuclear policy, which provided for the development of a three-component structure of Russia's strategic nuclear forces, tactical and operational-tactical nuclear weapons, and a nuclear weapons complex.

Following the December 1999 parliamentary election he served as deputy of the State Duma of the 3rd convocation from Fatherland – All Russia electoral bloc. Deputy Chairman of the State Duma Committee on Industry, Construction and Science-Intensive Technologies.

Following the December 2003 parliamentary election he served Deputy of the State Duma of the 4th convocation from the United Russia party. Chairman of the State Duma Committee on the Commonwealth of Independent States Affairs and Relations with Compatriots.

Following the December 2007 parliamentary election he served Deputy of the State Duma of the 5th convocation from the Yaroslavl regional group of the federal list of the United Russia party. From January 14, 2008, he served Deputy Head of the United Russia faction in the State Duma. From January 16, 2008, he served as First Deputy Chairman of the State Duma Committee on Science and High Technologies.

In 2003-2019 he served as dean of the Faculty of World Politics at Moscow State University. From November 2, 2022, he is Deputy President of the Russian Academy of Sciences, member of the Presidium of the Russian Academy of Sciences, Director of the Institute for Advanced Strategic Studies at the National Research University Higher School of Economics, Deputy Academic Director of the National Research University Higher School of Economics. Head of the Department of International Security, Faculty of World Politics, Lomonosov Moscow State University.

On October 26, 2020, on the occasion of Kokoshin's 75th birthday, Russia's Channel One referred to him as an outstanding statesman.

== Awards ==
- Order "For Merit to the Fatherland"
- Order of Alexander Nevsky
- Order of Honour
- Order of Friendship
- Order of the Badge of Honour
- Medal "In Commemoration of the 300th Anniversary of Saint Petersburg"
- Medal "For Strengthening Military Cooperation"
- Russian Federation Presidential Certificate of Honour
- Letter of Gratitude from the President of the Russian Federation
- Lenin Komsomol Prize
