= Fatherland (Russia) =

Former political organisation in Russia

Fatherland Отечество
- Chairman: Yuri Luzhkov
- Deputy Chairman: Andrei Kokoshin
- Secretary of the Political Council: Alexander Vladislavlev
- Founders: Yuri Luzhkov; Georgy Boos; Artur Chilingarov; Andrei Kokoshin and others
- Founded: 19 November 1998
- Registered: 19 December 1998
- Dissolved: 9 February 2002
- Split from: Our Home – Russia
- Merged into: United Russia
- Headquarters: Mosfilmovskaya 40, Moscow
- Newspaper: Vestnik Otechestva
- Youth wing: Youth Union of the Fatherland
- Membership (1999): 229,000
- Ideology: Centrism; Social democracy Social market economy Federalism
- Political position: Centre to centre-left
- National affiliation: Fatherland – All Russia (1999–2001); Unity and Fatherland (2001)
- International affiliation: Socialist International (co-operation)
- Colours: Orange; Red

Website
- www.luzhkov-otechestvo.ru www.otech.ru

The Fatherland (Russian: Отечество, romanized: Otechestvo, full name: All-Russian Political Public Organisation (OPOO) "Fatherland") was a Russian political organisation that existed from 1998 to 2002. The organisation was headed by the then Mayor of Moscow Yuri Luzhkov. In 1999, Fatherland became one of the components of the Fatherland – All Russia bloc, and in 2001 it merged into United Russia together with Unity and All Russia organisations.

The movement was described as the "party of power" in the last years of Boris Yeltsin's rule, after the demise of Our Home – Russia in 1998.

== History ==
=== Background ===
In the 1990s, Moscow Mayor Yuri Luzhkov, while not formally a member of Prime Minister Viktor Chernomyrdin's Our Home – Russia (NDR) party, supported President Boris Yeltsin and his government led by Chernomyrdin, called for voting for NDR in the elections, and had de facto leadership over NDR in Moscow.

On 1 November 1998, Luzhkov began forming the organizing committee of the Fatherland movement. According to the initial plan, the collective founders of the new movement were 5 organisations: the Union of Labour movement (led by Andrey Isayev), the Congress of Russian Communities (led by Dmitry Rogozin), the Women of Russia movement (led by Alevtina Fedulova), the Association of Veterans of Wars and Local Conflicts "Combat Brotherhood" (led by Boris Gromov) and the Foundation for the Development of Political Centrism (led by Stepan Sulakshin).

=== Foundation ===
On 19 November 1998, the first meeting of the Fatherland organizing committee was held in the Moscow City Hall Building, where Yuri Luzhkov was unanimously elected chairman of the movement. Andrei Kokoshin became deputy chairman, and Viktor Mishin. The organizing committee included more than a hundred people, including Georgy Boos, Vladimir Yevtushenkov, Anatoly Kulikov, Sergey Yastrzhembsky, Artur Chilingarov, Alexander Martynov, Yevgeny Savostyanov, Vladimir Lopatin, Joseph Kobzon, Anatoly Tyazhlov, Anatoly Efremov, Yuri Spiridonov, Anatoly Lisitsyn, Alexander Volkov, Sergey Katanandov, Nikolay Merkushkin, Yuri Yevdokimov, Ivan Sklyarov, Vitaly Mukha.

The founding congress of the Fatherland was held on 19 December 1998 in the Column Hall of the House of the Unions in Moscow. The founding congress was attended by 1,125 delegates from 88 regions of Russia, including many regional governors. The congress unanimously decided to establish the Fatherland organisation, confirmed the powers of 75 regional branches of the movement, adopted the organisation's charter, the program theses, elected Yuri Luzhkov as the leader, a Central Council of 69 people, and a Political Council of 15 people. Since 19 December 1998 was the last registration deadline for parties to participate in the December 1999 legislative election, Fatherland was registered with the Ministry of Justice on the same day, immediately after the end of the congress, and Justice Minister Pavel Krasheninnikov personally presented Luzhkov with a registration certificate.

In November–December 1998, many governors, heads of regional organisations and deputies from the then declining Our Home – Russia joined the Fatherland. On 28 December 1998, the NDR leader Viktor Chernomyrdin, after a meeting with Luzhkov, stated at a press conference that there were no contradictions between Fatherland and NDR and that the NDR was ready to cede the role of "party of power" to Fatherland.

On 12 January 1999, a meeting of the Fatherland Political Council was held with the participation of its leader Luzhkov. The Political Council spoke in favor of increasing the revenue side of the state budget adopted by the State Duma and spoke out against the Duma's ratification of the Russian–Ukrainian Friendship Treaty.

On 10 March 1999, at a press conference, Artur Chilingarov announced that the Fatherland federal list of in the State Duma election would possibly be headed by Yuri Luzhkov, and the number of Fatherland deputies in the next State Duma is planned to exceed 100 people.

In the election to the State Council of Udmurtia on 4 April 1999, Fatherland, led by regional head Alexander Volkov, became the largest party with 42 deputies out of 100, ensuring Volkov's re-election as head of the State Council.

On 24 April 1999, the 2nd Fatherland congress was held in Yaroslavl, attended by over 707 delegates representing 88 regions, and 113 delegates representing organisation members of the movement. The Fatherland movement program was adopted at the congress.

In the spring of 1999, Yuri Luzhkov repeatedly stated that he did not support the idea of impeaching President Boris Yeltsin. Nevertheless, in May 1999, the majority of the Fatherland State Duma deputies voted for impeachment.

In June 1999, the two co-founding organisations: the Congress of Russian Communities of Dmitry Rogozin, who criticized Luzhkov's rapprochement with the All Russia movement, and the Foundation for the Development of Political Centrism of Stepan Sulakshin, left the collective membership of the Fatherland movement.

On 18 August 1999, the Fatherland Political Council adopted a statement calling on the regions of Russia, all leading public organisations, industrialists and entrepreneurs to provide assistance to Dagestan and the Russian military in the war with Islamic radicals. Alexander Vladislavlev was elected Secretary of the Political Council.

According to the deputy head of the Fatherland election headquarters, Vyacheslav Volodin, the movement had 229,000 members in 1999, of which 35,000 were Muscovites.

=== Fatherland – All Russia, 1999 elections ===
In mid-July 1999, the election headquarters of Fatherland was created, headed by ex-Minister of Taxation Georgy Boos. In July 1999, Yury Luzhkov made an offer to Yevgeny Primakov, who had been dismissed from the post of Prime Minister earlier that year, to head the Fatherland list in the 1999 State Duma election. Primakov agreed on the condition that a broader bloc be formed - with the inclusion of All Russia and, preferably, the Agrarian Party of Russia. On 4 August 1999, after reaching a final coalition agreement between the Fatherland and All Russia, a united Coordinating Council of the Fatherland – All Russia (OVR) coalition was created, consisting of 13 people, 6 of whom were from the Fatherland. On 17 August, Primakov officially agreed to lead the coalition. On 21 August, at the Fatherland congress in Moscow, the decision to create a bloc headed by Primakov was finally approved; the congress also approved preliminary general lists of candidates for the State Duma. On 29 August, the Fatherland – All Russia coalition (with the participation of the Agrarian Party of Russia) was officially established, and the general lists of candidates were agreed upon.

In September 1999, the Women of Russia movement led by Alevtina Fedulova left the Fatherland movement and the OVR bloc due to dissatisfaction with the unpromising places received by the ZhR movement on the bloc's lists. The small number of positions on the OVR list and their unpromising places also caused a split in the Derzhava movement, faction of which, headed by the chairman of the executive committee Alexander Pronin, announced the withdrawal of Derzhava from Fatherland.

On 4 September 1999, the Central Election Commission of Rusisa registered the electoral Fatherland – All Russia bloc, with its official founders listed as Fatherland, the Regions of Russia movement, the For Equality and Justice movement, the Union of Christian Democrats of Russia and the Agrarian Party of Russia (APR). On 10 September, the OVR federal list was certified by the CEC.

On 26 November 1999, the "Youth for the Fatherland" congress was held in Moscow, at which the "Youth Union of the Fatherland" was established, with Sergei Rubakhin elected as its first secretary.

Following the 1999 legislative election, the Fatherland – All Russia bloc became the third largest faction after the CPRF and the Unity.

In 1999, candidates from Fatherland movement and the OVR bloc won the gubernatorial elections in 7 of the 14 contested regions: Moscow, Belgorod, Vologda Oblast, Novgorod Oblast, Omsk Oblast, Tambov Oblast and Yaroslavl Oblast, as well as 12 mayors of regional capitals: Saransk, Vladikavkaz, Kazan, Stavropol, Volgograd, Vologda, Kemerovo, Kostroma, Omsk, Yekaterinburg, Yaroslavl, Birobidzhan.

=== Creation of United Russia ===
In March 2000, speaking at a conference of the Fatherland Moscow city organisation, Yuri Luzhkov proposed supporting Vladimir Putin as the organisation's candidate for president in the snap presidential election.

In 2000, 28 governors, 17 mayors of administrative centers and 288 heads of municipalities were elected from the Fatherland and OVR.

On 12 April 2001, Fatherland leader Yuri Luzhkov and Unity leader Sergei Shoigu issued a statement on joint actions, beginning the consolidation of pro-presidential forces in the State Duma. A Consultative Council of four deputy groups was formed: OVR, Unity, Regions of Russia, and People's Deputy. On 26 April, Luzhkov made a statement on the basic principles of the unification of Fatherland and Unity. On 1 June, Luzhkov and Shoigu called for the creation of the union of Unity and Fatherland movements. The Coordination Council of the two organisations supported the leaders' proposal to create the union. At the Founding Congress on 12 July 2001, the creation of the "Unity and Fatherland" alliance was proclaimed. The alliance was headed by two co-chairmen, Yuri Luzhkov and Sergei Shoigu.

In August 2001, Yevgeny Primakov announced his resignation as head of the OVR faction in the State Duma. He was replaced by Vyacheslav Volodin, parliamentary secretary of the Fatherland party.

On 13 October 2001, at the third congress of the Fatherland party, a resolution was adopted on the creation of a political party jointly with Unity. This was done despite Luzhkov's earlier words that the movement would not disband and would be transformed into a political party in accordance with the new law on parties. On 27 October 2001, the second congress of the "Unity and Fatherland" alliance took place, where a decision was made to transform the union into a public organisation. At the congress, the All Russia movement also joined the alliance. The delegates adopted an appeal to members of the three organisations calling for work to begin transforming the alliance into a political party.

On 1 December 2001, the third congress of Unity and Fatherland was held, at which the delegates unanimously decided to create the All-Russian Political Party "Unity and Fatherland – United Russia". Yuri Luzhkov, Sergei Shoigu, and Mintimer Shaimiev were elected co-chairmen of the Supreme Council of the party.

On 9 February 2002, the fourth and final congress of the Fatherland took place, at which the movement was dissolved in connection with the beginning of the activities of the United Russia party.

== International activities ==
Representatives of the Fatherland participated in the events of the Socialist International, including its 21st Congress in Paris in November 1999. The Fatherland hosted a mission of the Socialist International in Moscow in September 2000, headed by the Prime Minister of Sweden, Göran Persson. During the mission, the Fatherland participated in a gathering entitled "A Vision for the Future – Dialogue on Social Democracy".

== Ideology ==
Fatherland was described as a centrist movement, which was one of the "party of power" in Yeltsin's last years, replacing the Our Home – Russia (NDR) in this field. At the same time, compared to the NDR, Fatherland had a broader ideological platform, which included some ideas of the moderate part of the then "left-patriotic" flank. Fatherland was described as the party of the post-Soviet bureaucratic center and "nomenklatura capitalism."

At the plenum of the Central Council on 16 December 2000, the Fatherland adopted a political line consisting of support for President Vladimir Putin, "pragmatic patriotism", "effective federalism", a social market economy and social democracy.

== Members ==
As of August 1999, the list of collective members of the Fatherland movement included the following organisations:

- Union of Labor (Andrey Isayev);
- Women of Russia (led by Alevtina Fedulova);
- Derzhava (Russian party) (led by Konstantin Zatulin);
- Russian United Industrial Party (led by Artur Chilingarov);
- Russian Union of Youth (led by Vera Skorobogatova);
- Young Social Democrats of Russia (led by Oleg Sokolov);
- Social Democratic Association of the Russian Federation (led by Alexander Gorbunov);
- Russian Ecological Movement "KEDR" (led by Viktor Danilov-Danilyan);
- My Fatherland (led by Viktov Mishin);
- Combat Brotherhood (led by Boris Gromov);
- Warriors of the Fatherland (led by Anatoly Kulikov);
- Education is the Future of Russia (Larisa Babukh);
- Association of Law Enforcement Officers (led by Aslambek Aslakhanov);
- Russian Union of Reserve Officers (led by Viktor Andreev);
- Russian Maritime Assembly (led by Mikhail Apollonov);
- Association of Naval Officers (led by Vladimir Mironov);
- Russian Association for Small Business Development (led by Alexander Ioffe);
- Spirituality, Faith, Revival (led by Sergei Bedov);
- Zhukovsky Movement of Russia "Life" (led by Oleg Sotnikov);
- Business Women of Russia (led by Natalia Kostina);
- Law and Order-Shield Foundation (led by Yuri Matsulenko);
- Union Party of the Revival of Russia (led by Vladimir Vasiliadi);
- Socialist People's Party of Russia (led by Martin Shakkum)
