= Georgy Boos =

Russian businessman and politician

- Георгий Боос
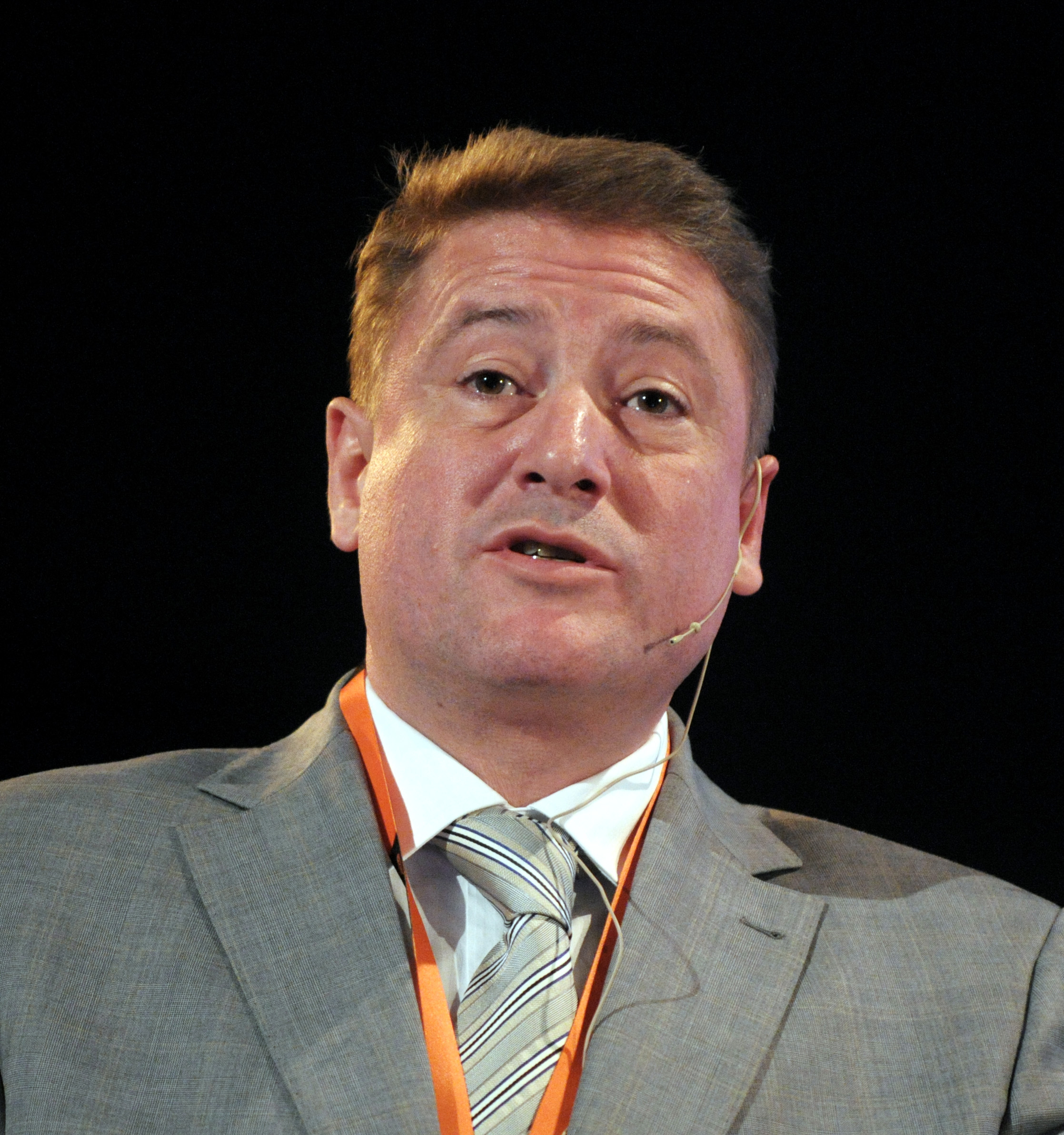
- Boos in 2009

4th Governor of Kaliningrad Oblast
- In office 12 November 2005 – 27 September 2010
- Preceded by: Vladimir Yegorov
- Succeeded by: Nikolay Tsukanov

Minister of Taxation
- In office 28 December 1998 – 24 May 1999
- Prime Minister: Yevgeny Primakov
- Preceded by: Office renamed
- Succeeded by: Alexander Pochinok

Head of State Taxation Service
- In office 29 September 1998 – 28 December 1998
- Prime Minister: Yevgeny Primakov
- Preceded by: Boris Fyodorov
- Succeeded by: Office renamed

Personal details
- Born: 22 January 1963 (age 63) Moscow, Russian SFSR, Soviet Union
- Party: Fatherland; United Russia
- Education: Moscow Power Engineering Institute
- Profession: Businessman, politician

Georgy Valentinovich Boos (Russian: Георгий Валентинович Боос, born 22 January 1963) is a Russian businessman and politician who served as the governor of Kaliningrad Oblast from 2005 to 2010.

== Early life and education ==
Boos was born in Moscow into a Crimean German family on 22 January 1963. His parents were both engineers. He graduated from the Moscow Power Engineering Institute in 1986 with an engineering degree.

In 1995 he received a Technical Sciences Ph.D. His thesis was titled "Improving the efficiency of outdoor lighting installations of cities streets and squares".

== Career ==
Boos performed his military service in the Soviet Air Force between 1986 and 1988 based at Spassk-Dalny.

In 1988, he was hired by the All-Union Technological and Lighting Scientific Research Institute (VNISI) in Moscow, where he remained for three years, holding the positions of Engineer, Senior Engineer and Junior Researcher. During the same time period, he was also a mathematics teacher at School No. 247 in Moscow.

From 1991 to 1995, he served as director of the Moscow Scientific Production Lighting Enterprise Svetoservis, which was founded by him and his father. In 1993 the company became a joint stock company, and Boos became its CEO. Since 1994, the firm is engaged in art-architectural lighting municipal facilities of Moscow as the main contractor. For his work on many enterprise professional exhibitions was medalist and winner of awards. Svetoservis patented a number of lighting solutions, the development of which also involved GV Boos. Among them was the industrially designed lamp, designed for use in doorways, which became known as "vandal-proof".

From 1995 to 1998 and again from 1999 to 2005, he was a deputy of the State Duma, in which he served as vice-speaker (from 2003 to 2005). Boos became a close ally of Mayor Yuri Luzhkov of Moscow. He was a member of Luzhkov's centrist Fatherland Party. After it merged with the Unity Party, Boos became a member of United Russia.

From 29 September until 23 December 1998, by resolution of Russian Federation Government, was appointed as the Chairman of the State Tax Service of the Russian Federation (from 23 December until 25 May 1999, by the Decree of the President of the Russian Federation become a Minister of the Russian Federation for Taxes and Levies). In May 1999, he was dismissed with the Primakov cabinet.

On 14 September 2005 he was proposed by President Vladimir Putin to the Kaliningrad Oblast legislature as a governor of Kaliningrad Oblast and was approved soon after this. His tenure as governor ended in September 2010.

On 28 December 2011 G. Boos was appointed chairman of the Board of Directors of VVC (All-Russian Exhibition Centre), but in June 2012 dismissed from the post.

On 14 January 2012 he was elected to the Board of Directors of the Holding of Interregional Distribution Grid Companies (JSC "Russian network"), and then was its chairman. until 28 June 2013.

He is the owner of the holding "Boos Lighting groups". BL Group Boos Lighting Group is a holding company that combines: a group of companies "Svetoservis", «GALAD» and «OPORA engenering».

Boos' income in 2008 amounted to 122,370,965 rubles, of which 841,572 rubles earned on the main job, were transferred to the accounts of orphanages Kaliningrad region. In 2009, revenue was 86.4 million rubles.

== Personal life ==
Boos married three times. He has eight children.

His father, Valentin Gerbertovich Boos (born 1938), is a Candidate of Technical Sciences, a member of the board of directors of OOO VNISI, and holds a patent for a “Method of measuring road pavement”.

He is married. He has seven daughters and a son, Gleb (born 2017), from three marriages.

His first wife, Valentina Yuryevna Boos, graduated from the Moscow Power Engineering Institute. She married Georgy Boos during her student years; after four years of marriage, the couple divorced. She works as a speech therapist-defectologist and in 2008 released the video course “Home Speech Therapist”.

Their daughter from the first marriage, Ekaterina, was born in 1986. In 2007, she graduated from the Moscow Power Engineering Institute. In 2007–2008, she worked as a test engineer at the Moscow Experimental Lighting Plant, part of the Svetoservis holding; in 2008–2009, she served as chief specialist at OOO Svetoservis. Since September 2009, she has been the General Director of OOO Svetoproekt and a member of the board of directors of the All-Russian Lighting Research Institute named after S. I. Vavilov. On 23 January 2009, she gave birth to a son, a grandson of Georgy Boos.

His second wife, Elena Vladimirovna Lirina-Boos (born 1966), married Boos in 1996; they met at the Lianozovo Tennis Club. She initially worked as the financial director of the parent company of Boos's holding, ZAO NPSP Svetoservis, and after her husband's election to the State Duma in 1999, she became head of the company. Several years later, she divorced Boos but remained General Director of the Svetosistema holding until 2006. According to SPARK, Elena Lirina owns 11.04% of the shares of ZAO NPSP Svetoservis. Since 2005, she has served as General Director of OOO Management Company BL GROUP. From 2008, she chaired the board of directors of Vneshprombank. Their daughter Elena was born on 16 November 1996; her godfather is Yuri Luzhkov.

His third wife, Anna Vyacheslavovna Boos, is a graduate of the Faculty of Economics of Moscow State University and worked at a bank. She is an affiliated person of OAO Moscow Experimental Lighting Plant.[97] In this marriage were born Nadezhda (2002), Maria (2004), Lyubov (2006), Vera (16 August 2009), Gleb (2017), and Irina (18 August 2020).

During his tenure as governor, he preferred to travel outside Kaliningrad Oblast by private jet which, judging by his income declaration, was not owned by him but was decorated with the coat of arms of Kaliningrad Oblast.

In Kaliningrad, he resided in his private home with a total area of 691.6 m^{2}, located in an elite neighborhood on Demyan Bedny Street in the Leningradsky District.

His income for 2008 amounted to 122,370,965 rubles, of which 841,572 rubles earned at his primary place of employment were transferred to the accounts of children's homes in Kaliningrad Oblast (link unavailable). In 2009, his income amounted to 86.4 million rubles.

== Honours and award ==
- Order For Merit to the Fatherland 4th class (21 January 2008) – for outstanding contribution to the socio-economic development of the region and many years of fruitful work
- Order of Honour (28 January 2004) – for active participation in legislative activities and many years of diligent work
- Medal "For Services in the Conduct of the Population Census"
- Medal "In Commemoration of the 850th Anniversary of Moscow"
- Medal "In Commemoration of the 300th Anniversary of Saint Petersburg"
- Jubilee Medal "70 Years of the Armed Forces of the USSR"
- State Prize of the Russian Federation in the field of literature and art in 1996 (29 May 1997) – for the formation of light-color Moscow environment
- Diploma of the Government of the Russian Federation (6 July 1999) – for services to the state and years of diligent work
- Medal "Federation Council. 15 years "(2008) – for many years of hard work, great contribution to the interaction of the Federation Council of the Federal Assembly of the Russian Federation and state bodies, organizations in the development and improvement of the federal legislation of the Russian Federation, and the strengthening of the Russian state in connection with the 15th anniversary Council of Federation of the Federal Assembly of the Russian Federation
- Commander of the Order "For Merit" (Gabon, 2000)
- Order of Holy Blessed Prince Daniel of Moscow II degree (ROC, 2006)
- Higher Law Award "Themis" (17 February 2007) in the category "Russia and Europe" – For the development of civil society in the process of integration of the Russian Federation and the European Union
- Honorary Doctor of BFU. Kant (2012)

== Publications ==
- Reference Book on Lighting Engineering. Edited by G. V. Boos and Yu. B. Aizenberg. 4th ed.
