= War Veterans Committee =

Russian organization

War Veterans Committee logo.

The War Veterans Committee, or simply WVC is a public international association of social veterans' organizations since 1992. War Veterans Committee unites about 40 veterans' organizations of CIS states. The Head of WVC is Ruslan Aushev. On 23 July 2004, the War Veterans Committee was granted a special consultative status by the United Nations Economic and Social Council.

== See also ==
- Commonwealth of Independent States
- Ruslan Aushev
- United Nations Organization
