= Vladimir Resin =

Russian politician (born 1936)

- Владимир Ресин
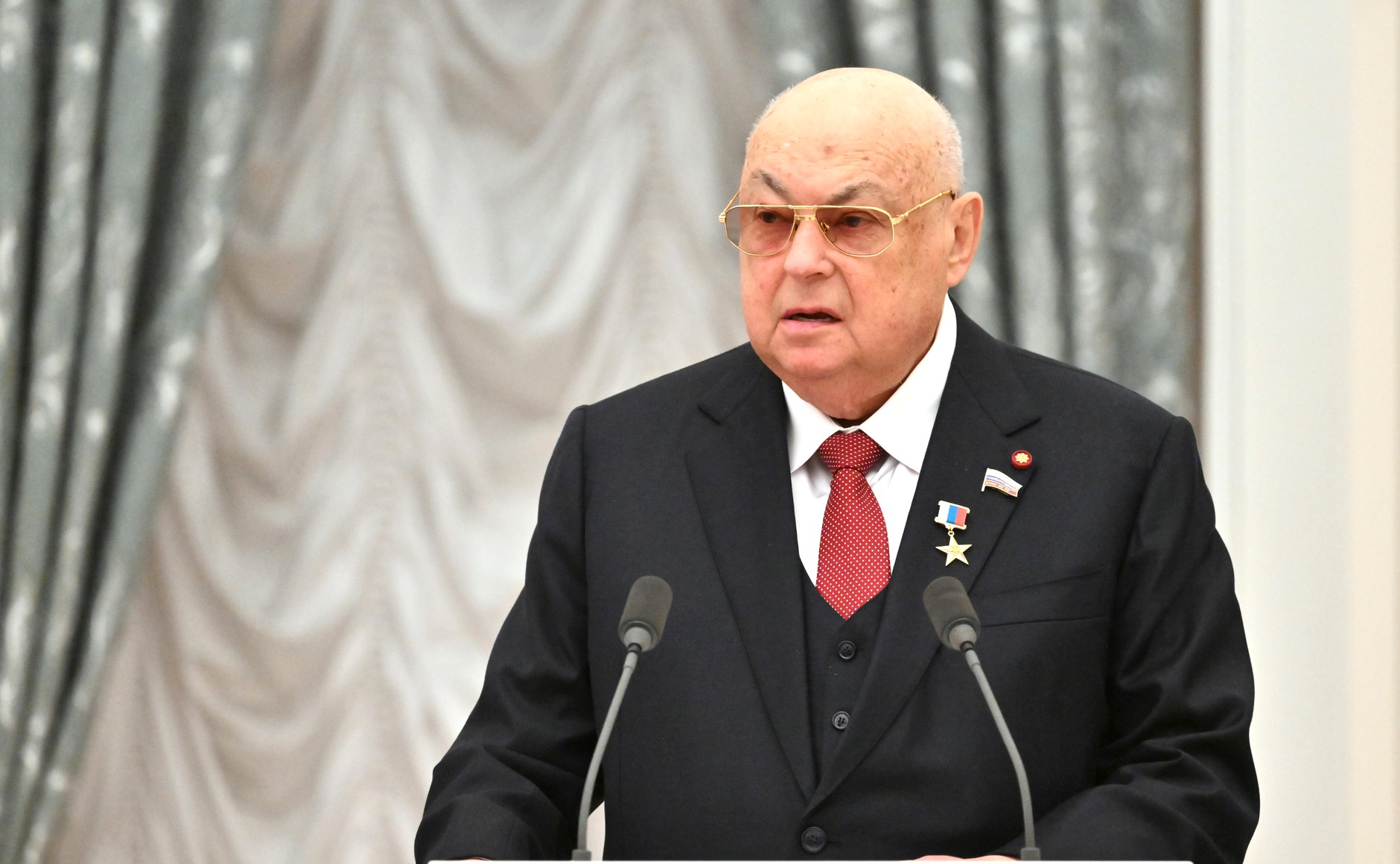
- Resin in 2024

Member of the State Duma
- Incumbent
- Assumed office 21 December 2011

First Deputy Mayor of Moscow
- In office 27 August 2001 – 13 December 2011

Acting Mayor of Moscow
- In office 28 September 2010 – 21 October 2010
- Preceded by: Yury Luzhkov
- Succeeded by: Sergey Sobyanin

Personal details
- Born: 21 February 1936 (age 90) Minsk, Byelorussian SSR, Soviet Union (now Belarus)
- Party: United Russia
- Education: Moscow State Mining University
- Profession: Doctor of Science in Economics
- Awards
- Vladimir Resin's voice Recorded 28 September 2013

Vladimir Iosifovich Resin (Russian: Влади́мир Ио́сифович Ре́син; born 21 February 1936) is a Russian politician who was the acting Mayor of Moscow, appointed by Russian president Dmitry Medvedev to succeed Yury Luzhkov on 28 September 2010. Resin previously served as the first deputy mayor under Luzhkov.

== Biography ==
Resin was born to a Jewish family on 21 February 1936 in Minsk. He graduated from the Moscow Mining Institute in 1958 and worked in the construction and mining sectors. In 1988, he started working in the Moscow city administration. He was the head of architecture and construction, as well as the acting mayor after Yury Luzhkov's dismissal in September 2010. Soon after he joined the ruling United Russia party and was considered possible candidate for mayoralty. Resin kept his position of first deputy mayor for more than a year after Luzhkov's dismissal. In December 2011 he was elected member of the 6th State Duma of Russia. In the 8th convocation of Russia's lower house Resin is the oldest member.

Resin has a penchant for expensive wristwatches the most expensive recognized by experts as Swiss-made DeWitt, La Pressy Grande Complication, costing more than $1 million.

=== Legislative activity ===
From 2011 to the present, during his tenure as a deputy of the 6th, 7th, and 8th convocations of the State Duma, he has co-authored 30 legislative initiatives and amendments to draft federal laws.

== Income and Assets ==
According to official data, in 2011 Resin and his wife declared an income of over 44.2 million rubles. Together, they own two land plots with a total area of 13,200 square meters, two residential houses measuring 437 and 1,632 square meters, a security house, two apartments, and four passenger cars.

According to an investigation by the Anti-Corruption Foundation (FBK) published in September 2021, Resin owns real estate in Russia and Prague valued at over 2 billion rubles, and possesses a watch collection worth 165 million rubles.

== Sanctions ==
He was sanctioned by the UK government in 2022 in relation to the Russo-Ukrainian War.

He is one of the members of the State Duma the United States Treasury sanctioned on 24 March 2022 in response to the 2022 Russian invasion of Ukraine.

== Gallery ==
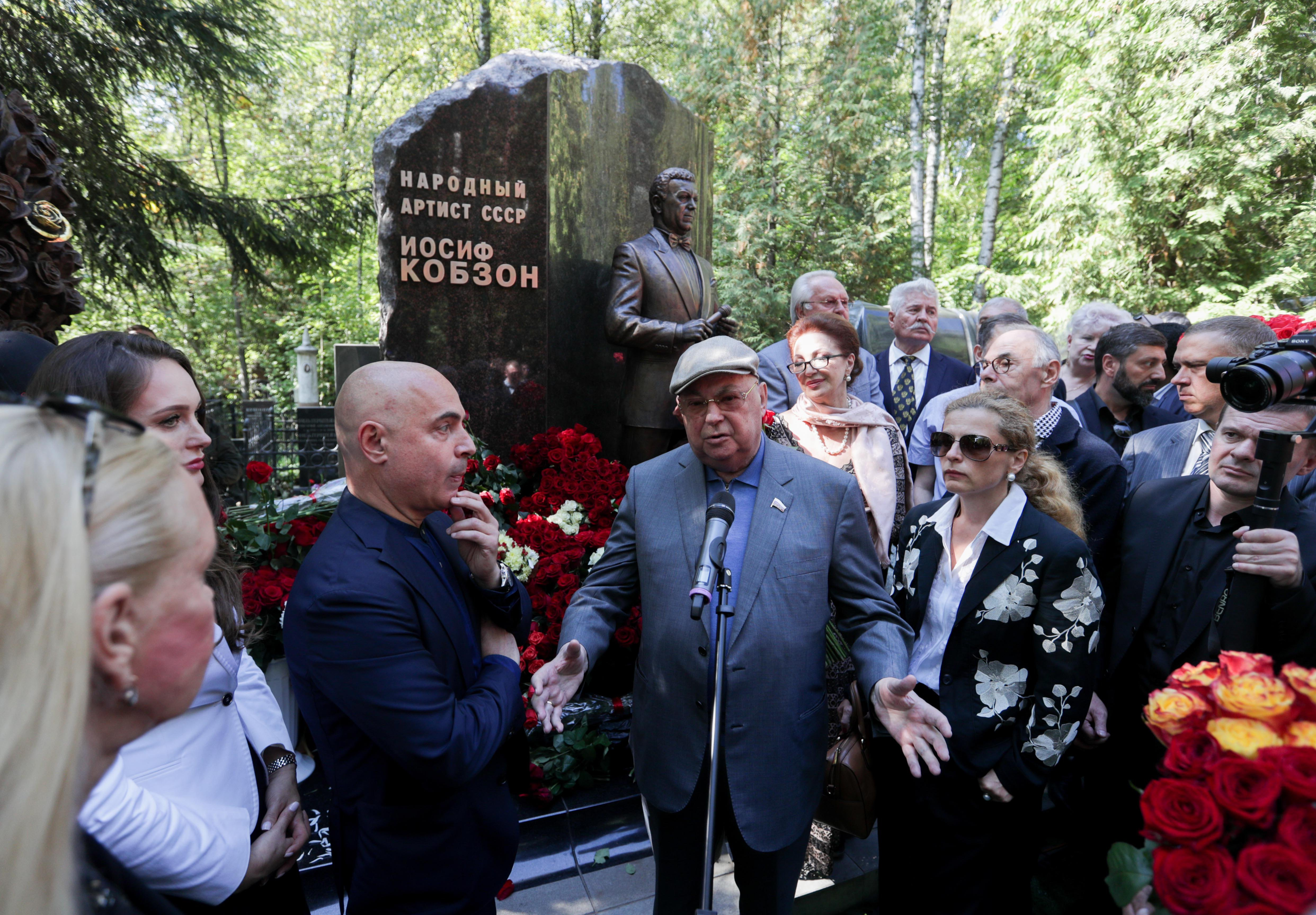
On opening of grave of Joseph Kobzon

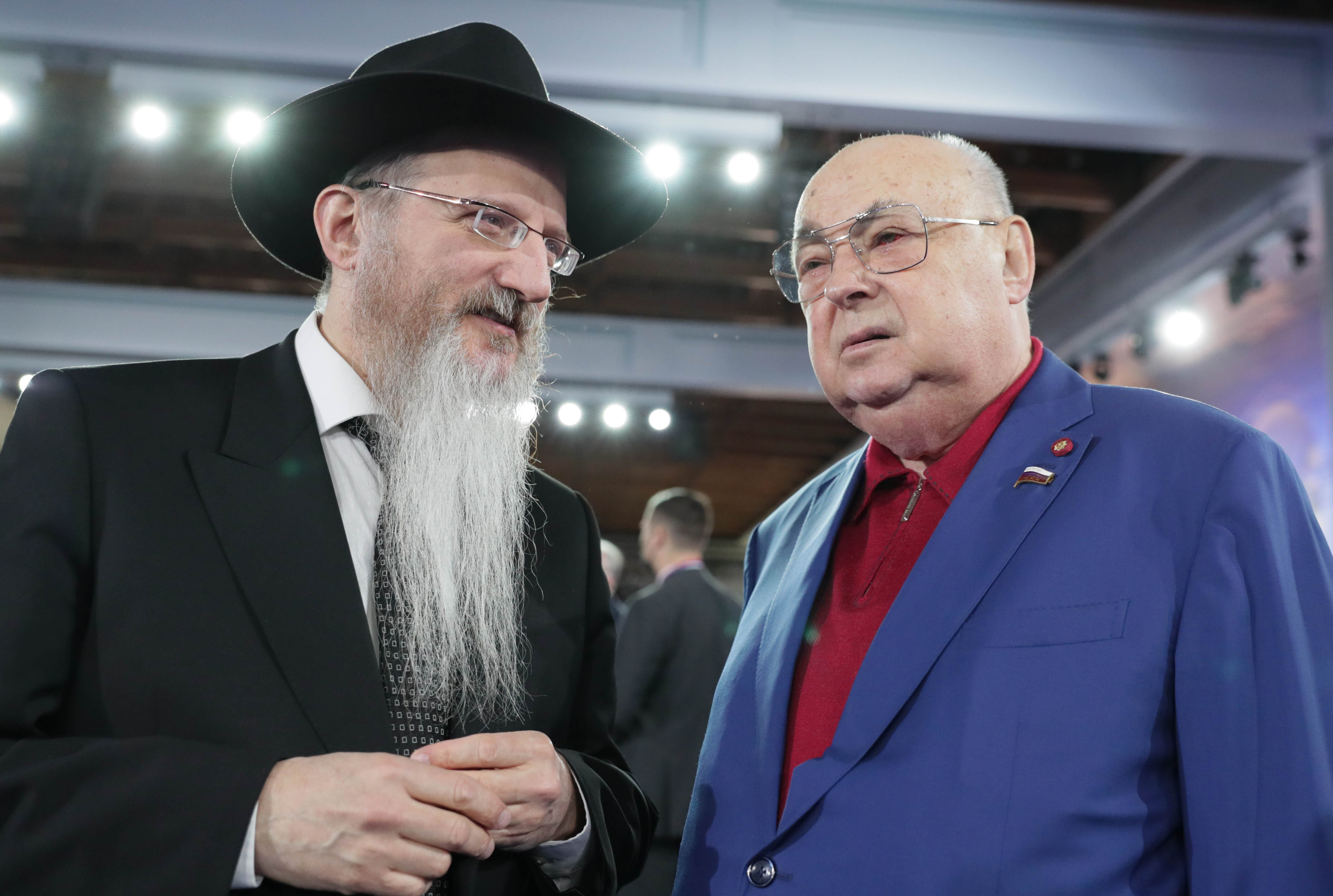
With Berl Lazar

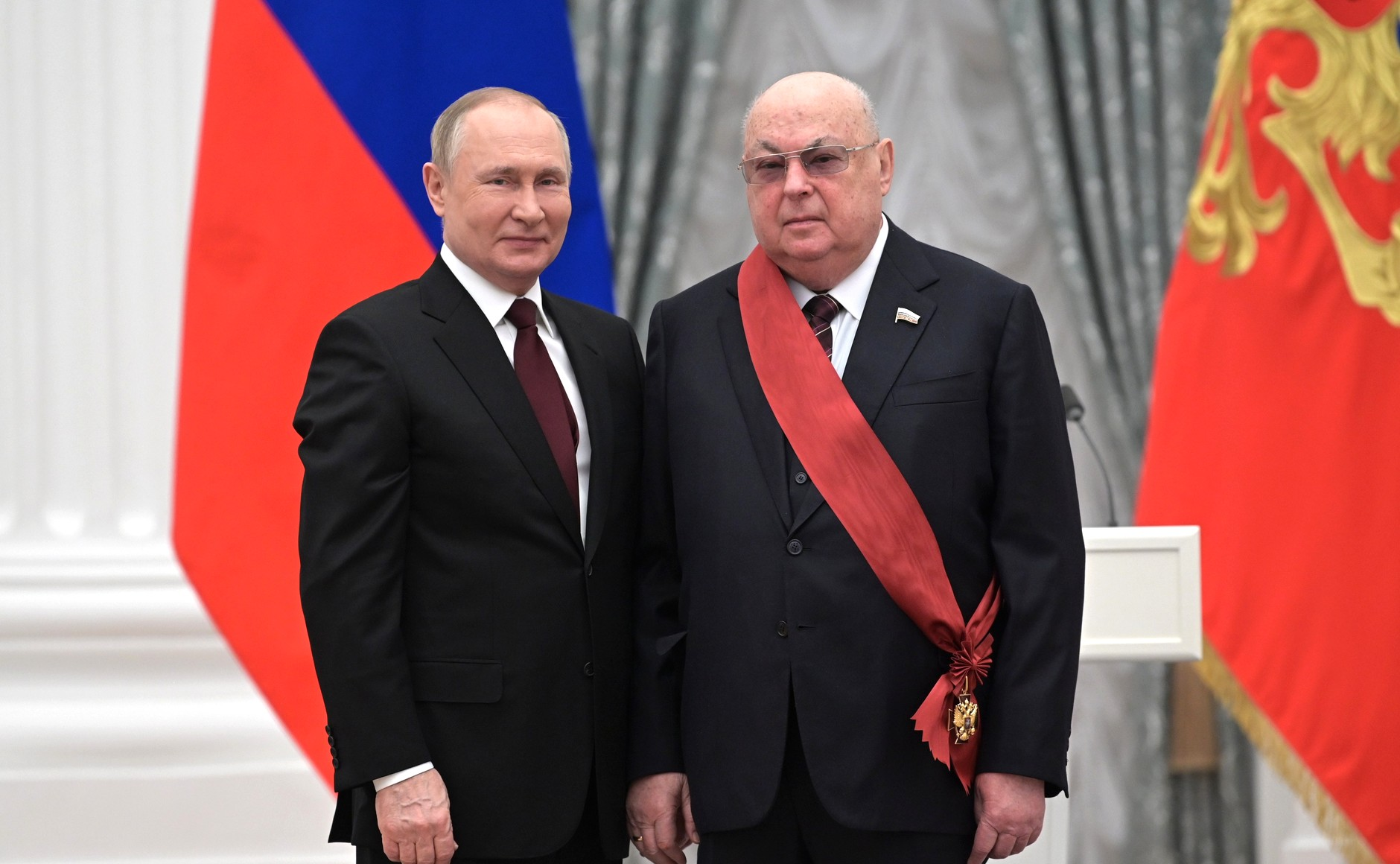
Presentation of the Order "For Merit to the Fatherland", 1st class

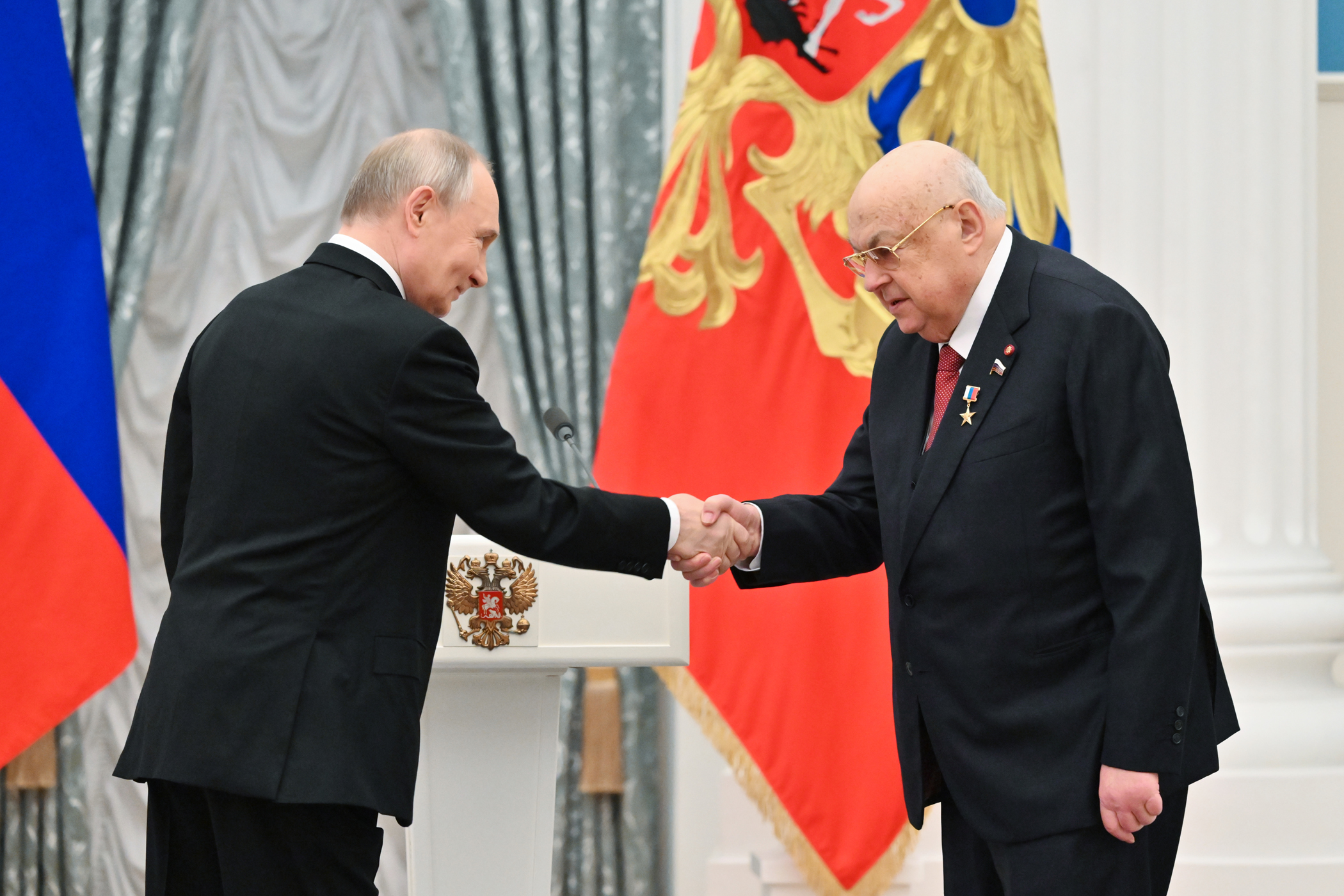
Presentation of the star of Hero of Labour of the Russian Federation

Political offices
Preceded by Yury Luzhkov	Mayor of Moscow (acting); 2010	Succeeded by Sergey Sobyanin
