= Fatherland – All Russia =

Former political bloc in Russia

Fatherland – All Russia Отечество — Вся Россия (Russian)
- Abbreviation: OVR
- Leaders: Yevgeny Primakov; Yuri Luzhkov; Vladimir Yakovlev
- State Duma faction leader: Yevgeny Primakov (first); Vyacheslav Volodin (last)
- Chairman of the Electoral Headquarters: Georgy Boos
- Founders: Yuri Luzhkov; Yevgeny Primakov; Mintimer Shaimiev; Vladimir Yakovlev
- Founded: 28 August 1999
- Dissolved: 9 February 2002
- Merged into: United Russia
- Newspaper: Vestnik Otechestva
- Member parties: See Composition
- Ideology: Centrism; Social market economy Federalism
- Political position: Centre to centre-left
- Colours: Light blue Orange
- State Duma (1999): 68 / 450

Website
- ovr.ru

Fatherland – All Russia (Note: Russian: Отечество — Вся Россия, romanized: Otečestvo – Vsja Rossija; OVR) was a political bloc that existed in Russia from 1998 to 2002. The bloc consisted of the Fatherland movement, the All Russia movement, the Agrarian Party of Russia and other small movements, and was headed by former Prime Minister Yevgeny Primakov, Moscow Mayor Yury Luzhkov and Saint Petersburg Governor Vladimir Yakovlev.

The bloc participated in the 1999 legislative election, winning third place despite expectations of victory. In the 2000 presidential election, the bloc supported Vladimir Putin. In 2001, the bloc merged with the Unity party to form the United Russia.

== History ==
=== Background ===
The bloc's founding organizations, Fatherland and All Russia, were founded in December 1998 and May 1999 respectively, and both emerged from the then collapsing Boris Yeltsin's united "party of power" Our Home – Russia. Both movements were led by the heads of the largest Russian regions: Fatherland was led by Moscow Mayor Yury Luzhkov, and All Russia by Saint Petersburg Governor Vladimir Yakovlev and Tatarstan President Mintimer Shaimiev.

In April-May 1999, Fatherland and All Russia held talks about a possible union, but the talks remained fruitless, presumably due to the intrigues of the president Yeltsin's entourage, which did not want Luzhkov to strengthen and, because of this, put pressure on Mintimer Shaimiev and other leaders of All Russia. In June 1999, the Congress of Russian Communities, headed by Dmitry Rogozin, broke with the Fatherland, including because of Rogozin's opposition to the "dubious alliance" with All Russia.

=== Foundation ===
In July 1999, Luzhkov proposed to the recently dismissed Prime Minister Yevgeny Primakov to head the Fatherland list in the December 1999 State Duma election. Primakov made the formation of a broader list, with All Russia and preferably the Agrarian Party of Russia, a condition of his consent. Earlier, in June 1999, the APR offered Primakov to head its own party list, but Primakov stated that he would like to see the agrarians "as part of the bloc of healthy forces."

On 4 August 1999, an agreement was reached between the Fatherland and All Russia to create a coalition Fatherland – All Russia (OVR); a united Coordination Council consisting of 13 people was created. On 17 August, Yevgeny Primakov agreed to head the coalition, and its creation was officially announced. On 21 August, the creation of the bloc was approved at the congresses of the Fatherland and All Russia.

On 27 August 1999, the Agrarian Party of Russia at its extraordinary VIII Congress decided to join the Fatherland – All Russia bloc, but the dissenting APR faction led by Nikolai Kharitonov left the congress and announced its intention to run on the Communist Party list. 16 of the 79 regional APR organizations voted against joining the OVR, and they then joined the CPRF.

The bloc was legally established at a joint congress on 28 August 1999, with the top three on its list being co-chairmen Yevgeny Primakov, Yuri Luzhkov, and Vladimir Yakovlev. At the congress, a united electoral headquarters of the OVR was created, headed by Georgy Boos (representing the Fatherland), and his first deputy was Vladimir Medvedev (representing All Russia). The headquarters also included representatives of the APR.

On 4 September 1999, the Central Election Commission registered the Fatherland – All Russia electoral bloc, the five legal founders of which were Fatherland, the Regions of Russia movement, the Agrarian Party of Russia, the movement "For Equality and Justice" and the Union of Christian Democrats of Russia.

=== 1999 legislative election ===
The Fatherland – All Russia candidates lists for the State Duma election was certified by the Central Election Commission on 10 September 1999 and officially registered on 9 October. The list underwent significant corrections within a month - the Democratic Party of Russia leaders Georgy Hatsenkov and Vyacheslav Zhidilyaev, and the Republican Party of Russia leader Vladimir Lysenko, were removed from it. Also, many governors from All Russia - Mintimer Shaimiev, Murtaza Rakhimov, Ruslan Aushev, Pyotr Sumin, Gennady Igumnov, Leonid Polezhayev - were not included in the lists of the OVR bloc. In October 1999, Polezhayev, without leaving All Russia, became a member of the Coordination Council of OVR competitor bloc Unity.

The opponents of the Fatherland – All Russia were the Unity and Union of Right Forces blocs. During the election campaign, Unity and OVR waged a tough confrontation in the media. During the campaign, the OVR leadership did not rule out the possibility of coordinating candidates with the CPRF and Yabloko parties.

OVR leader Yevgeny Primakov claimed that the bloc expects to win at least 25% of the seats in the next State Duma.

Following the 1999 legislative election, the Fatherland – All Russia bloc became the third largest faction after the CPRF and the Unity, what was described as an unexpectedly low result. The bloc won 13.59% of votes on the party list and 68 seats out of 450.

In the 3rd State Duma, OVR created a faction headed by Yevgeny Primakov and two internal deputy groups representing the interests of the regions and the agricultural sector, respectively. At the same time, some of the deputies of the Agrarian Party of Russia who received seats from OVR joined the pro-CPRF faction and created the Agro-Industrial Deputy Group. The leaders of All Russia, separate from Fatherland, held a meeting with Putin shortly after the elections, where they expressed support for his government.

=== 2000 presidential election ===
In November 1999, Anatoly Lisitsyn, the Governor of Yaroslavl Oblast and a member of the Central Council of the OVR bloc, declared that Prime Minister Vladimir Putin should be the sole candidate of the OVR and Unity blocs in the 2000 presidential election. The bloc's leadership stated that this was only Lisitsyn's personal opinion, and that the bloc's official position on this issue had not yet been developed. The Kommersant newspaper reported that on Saturday, 20 November 1999, Luzhkov and Primakov met with Putin at one of the government dachas and declared that they were ready to support him. In return, they asked for his support for the OVR bloc in the parliamentary elections, but "the proposal did not find a reciprocal response." Finally, in December, Putin publicly announced his preference for the Unity bloc.

Despite Yevgeny Primakov's initial plans to run for president, In early 2000, first All Russia and then Fatherland came out in support of Putin's candidacy.

=== Merger into United Russia ===
In May 2000, the All Russia movement took part in the creation of the Unity party (together with the Unity and Our Home – Russia movements), and later that year the OVR bloc began a course for an alliance and subsequent merger into one party with Unity.

On 12 April 2001, Fatherland leader Yuri Luzhkov and Unity leader Sergei Shoigu issued a joing declaration in which they announced their intention to unite into one party. The Coordination Council of Pro-Presidential Forces was formed in the State Duma, which included OVR, Unity, and two deputy groups: Regions of Russia and People's Deputy. On 12 July, the founding congress of the "Unity and Fatherland" union was held, and in October 2001, All Russia joined the union.

In August 2001, Yevgeny Primakov announced his resignation as head of the OVR faction in the State Duma. He was replaced by Vyacheslav Volodin, parliamentary secretary of the Fatherland.

On 1 December 2001, the third congress of Unity and Fatherland union was held, at which the delegates unanimously decided to create the All-Russian Political Party "Unity and Fatherland – United Russia". Yuri Luzhkov, Sergei Shoigu, and Mintimer Shaimiev were elected co-chairmen of the Supreme Council of the party. On 8 and 9 February 2002, Unity, Fatherland, and All Russia held liquidation congresses. On 15 August 2003, the Fatherland – All Russia parliamentary faction was renamed to Fatherland – United Russia.

== Ideology ==
OVR was described as a centrist or centre-left alliance. The bloc's platform advocated a course towards "federal brotherhood of all regions of Russia", preventing the redistribution of property, using state levers to regulate economic progress in the interests of taxpayers, and freeing the media from state censorship. Despite stressing that the OVR supports a strong presidential power, the coalition advocated devolving some of his powers to parliament, the prime minister and his government.

Both Primakov and Luzhkov came out in support of the federal government during the 1999 Dagestan incursions and the early stages of the Second Chechen War, although they emphasized their opposition to the escalation of the conflict into a full-scale war against Chechnya with large numbers of civilian casualties.

In foreign policy, the bloc expressed disillusionment with Western policy towards Russia and advocated strengthening ties with other CIS states, as well as with India, China and the Arab states.

The bloc was described by political scientist Vladimir Pribylovsky as representing the interests of a part of the ruling Russian bureaucracy (nomenklatura) that stood in opposition to President Boris Yeltsin and his entourage (The Family). According to Konstantin Zatulin, the leader of Derzhaza, a member of OVR, the creation of an opposition bloc to Yeltsin caused a sharp rejection by the head of the presidential administration, Alexander Voloshin. During the 1999 legislative election, a discrediting campaign was launched against the OVR Bloc by media controlled by the presidential administration and Boris Berezovsky.

The election campaign of the OVR bloc was financed by the oil concern Lukoil of Vagit Alekperov and the conglomerate AFK Sistema of Vladimir Yevtushenkov.

== Composition ==
The bloc is made up of the following parties:

Party	Ideology	Political position	Leader
Fatherland; Отечество	Centrism; Social democracy Social market economy Federalism	Centre to centre-left	Yury Luzhkov
All Russia; Вся Россия	Centrism; Regionalism; Federalism	Centre	Vladimir Yakovlev
Agrarian Party of Russia; Аграрная партия России (majority faction)	Agrarian socialism	Centre-left	Mikhail Lapshin
Regions of Russia; Регионы России	Regionalism	Centre	Vladimir Medvedev; Oleg Morozov
For Equality and Justice; За равноправие и справедливость	Regionalism; Multiculturalism	Centre	Ruslan Aushev; Boris Agapov
Union of Christian Democrats of Russia; Союз христианских демократов России	Christian democracy	Centre	Vladimir Bauer

== Electoral results ==
=== Presidential ===
Election	Candidate	First round		Second round		Result
Election	Candidate	Votes	%	Votes	%	Result
2000	Endorsed Vladimir Putin	39,740,467	53.44%	—N/a		Won

=== State Duma ===
Election	Party leader	Performance					Rank	Government
Election	Party leader	Votes	%	± pp	Seats	+/–	Rank	Government
1999	Yevgeny Primakov	15,549,182	13.59	New	68 / 450	New	3rd	Coalition
