= Gavriil Popov (politician) =

1st Mayor of Moscow

- Гавриил Попов
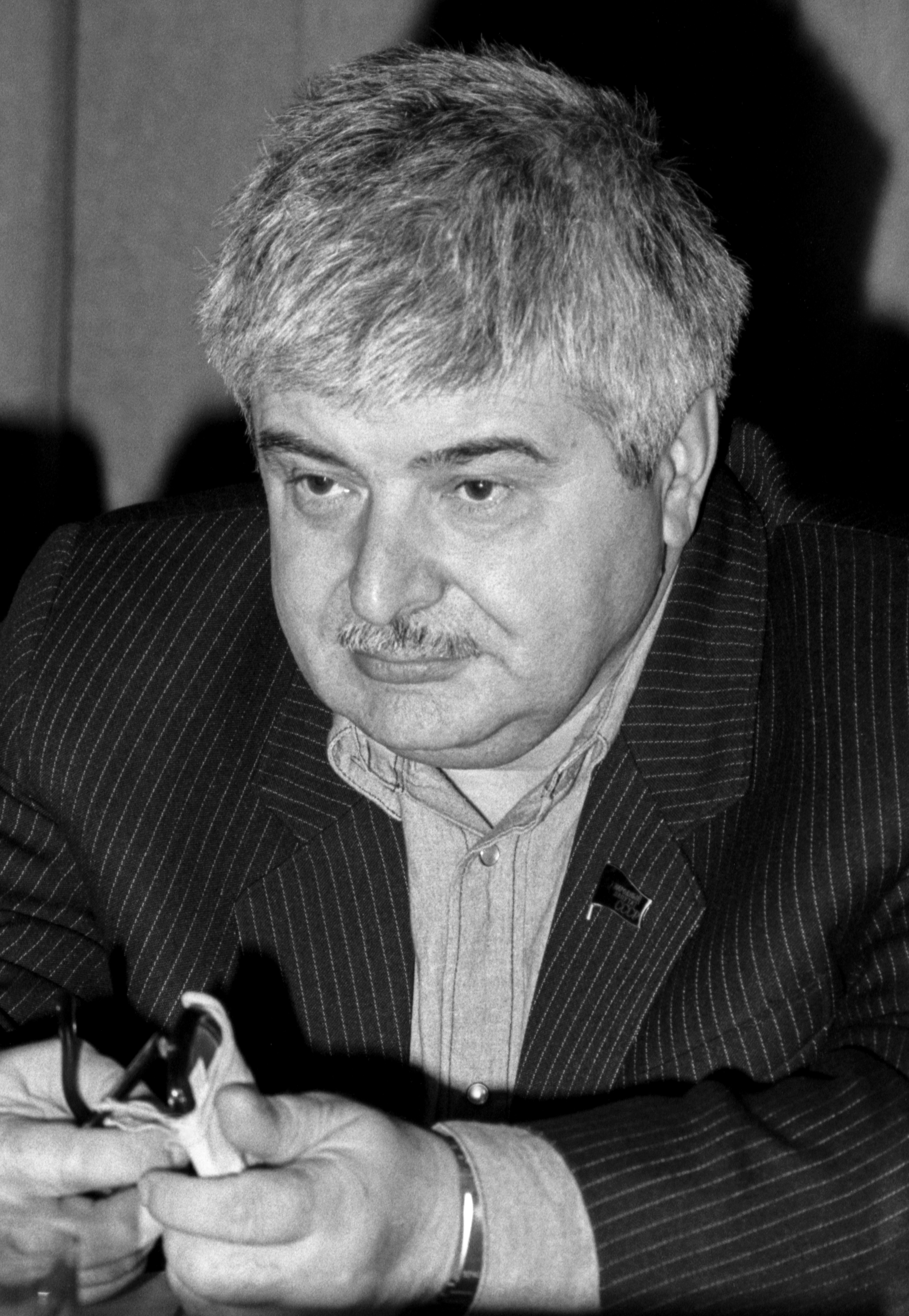
- Popov in 1991

1st Mayor of Moscow
- In office 12 June 1991 – 6 June 1992
- Deputy: Yury Luzhkov
- Preceded by: Yury Luzhkov as chairman of the executive committee of the Moscow City Council
- Succeeded by: Yury Luzhkov

Personal details
- Born: 31 October 1936 (age 89) Moscow, Soviet Union
- Party: Just Russia (2007–present)
- Other political affiliations: Communist Party (1959–1990); Democratic Russia (1990–1994); Independent (1994–2001); Social Democratic Party (2001–2007)
- Spouse: Irina
- Children: Chariton; Basil
- Education: Moscow State University (1959)

Gavriil Kharitonovich Popov (Russian: Гавриил Харитонович Попов, IPA: [ɡəvrʲɪˈiɫ xərʲɪˈtonəvʲɪtɕ pɐˈpof]; born 31 October 1936), anglicised as Gabriel Popov, is a Russian politician and economist. He served as the mayor of Moscow from 1991 until he resigned in 1992.

== Biography ==
Born to a Greek family in Moscow, Popov graduated Moscow Lomonosov University in political economy. He joined the Soviet Communist Party in 1959 and served as a secretary of the Komsomol committee of his university. Popov remained at the faculty of economics as a graduate student, then docent, and in 1978 became dean of the faculty. Yegor Gaidar, who would become Prime Minister of Russia, was one of his students.

During Perestroika Popov became heavily involved in politics. On June 12, 1991, he became the first democratically elected mayor of Moscow. In 1990, he left the CPSU, following Boris Yeltsin's lead at the 28th Congress. He resigned in 1992 and was replaced by the vice-mayor, Yury Luzhkov. In January 2010, he and Luzhkov published an article highly critical of Yegor Gaidar.

After 1992, Popov returned to academia. He is now president of the International University in Moscow.

== Footnotes ==
Political offices
Preceded by Valery Saikin	Mayor of Moscow; 1990–1992	Succeeded by Yury Luzhkov
