= Ruslan Aushev =

Soviet-Russian Ingush lieutenant general and politician

- Руслан Аушев; Овшанаькъан Руслан
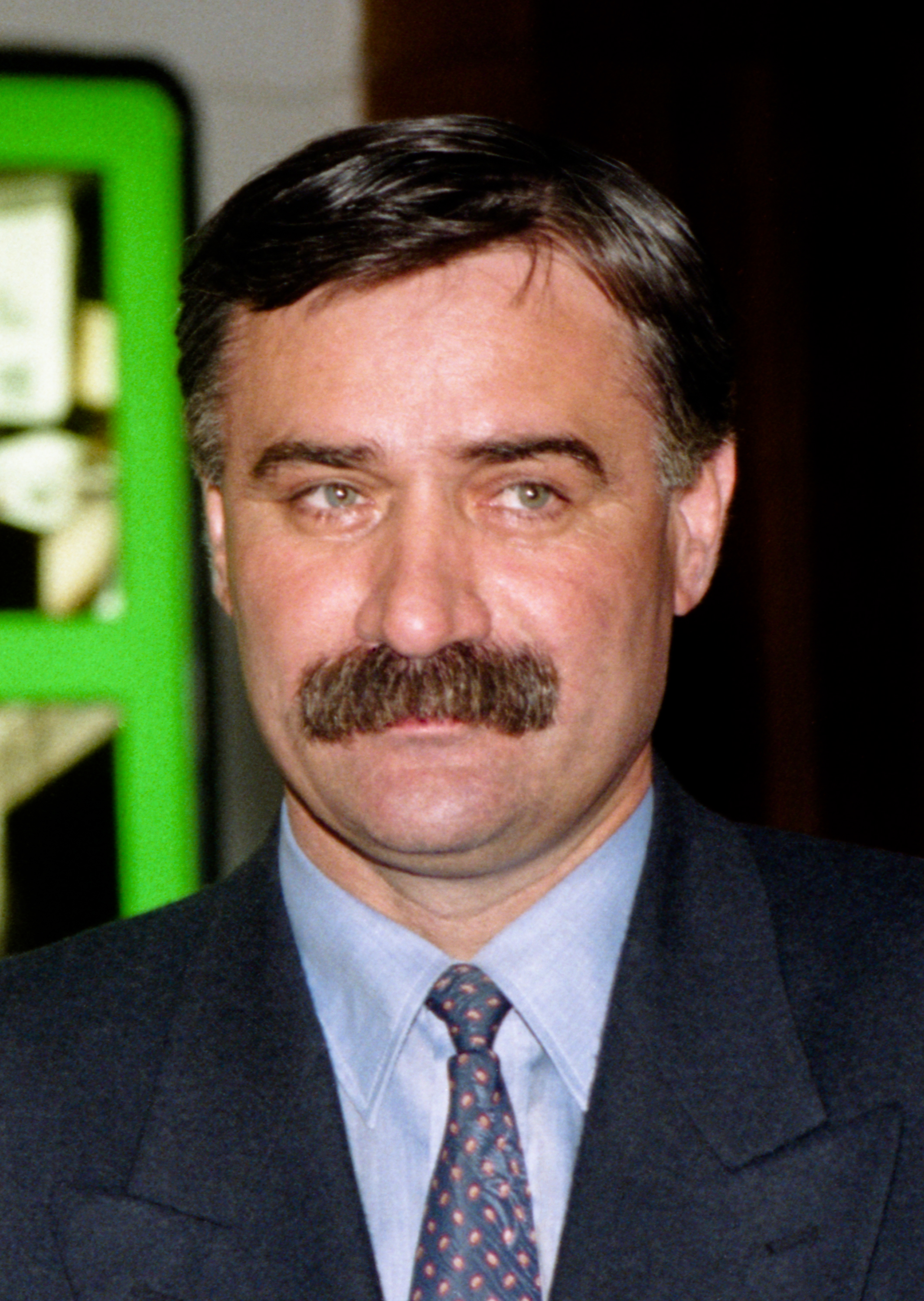
- Aushev in 2008

Russian Federation Senator from the Republic of Ingushetia
- In office 10 January 2002 – 23 April 2002
- Preceded by: Seat established
- Succeeded by: Issa Kostoyev

1st President of Ingushetia
- In office 7 March 1993 – 29 December 2001
- Preceded by: Position established (Magomed Sultygov Heads of the Provisional Administration of Ingush Republic)
- Succeeded by: Murat Zyazikov

Personal details
- Born: 29 October 1954 (age 71) Volodarskoe village, Kazakh SSR, Soviet Union (now Kazakhstan)
- Party: Independent; All Russia (1999–2001)
- Spouse: Aza Bamatgirovna Ausheva
- Children: 4
- Profession: Soldier and politician

Military service
- Allegiance: Soviet Union
- Branch/service: Soviet Army
- Years of service: 1971–2000
- Rank: Lieutenant general
- Battles/wars: Soviet–Afghan War
- Awards: Hero of the Soviet Union
- Ruslan Aushev's voice Aushev discussing agreements signed between the governments of Ingushetia and Russia; Recorded 1 April 2013

Ruslan Sultanovich Aushev (Note: Russian: Руслан Султанович Аушев, IPA: [rʊsˈɫan sʊɫˈtanəvʲɪtɕ ˈaʊʂɨf]; Ingush: Овшанаькъан Солта Руслан, romanized: Ovşanäq̇an Solta Ruslan, IPA: [ˈɔʊʃənɛ̯æq’ə̃ ˌsʷɔɫtə rʷʊsˈɫɑn]) (born 29 October 1954) is a Russian Ingush former politician. He was the President of Ingushetia from March 1993 to December 2001. He was reportedly the youngest officer in the Soviet Army to reach the rank of lieutenant general. He was awarded the title Hero of the Soviet Union on 7 May 1982 for his actions in Afghanistan. Aushev emerged as Ingushetia's most popular politician, having kept peace and stability during the First Chechen War.

== Early life ==
Aushev was born on 29 October 1954 to an Ingush family living in Kazakhstan, who were deported from the Russian SFSR in 1944. Very little is known about Aushev's early life.

== Military service ==
Aushev entered the Soviet military in 1971 and graduated from the Ordzhonikidze Higher Combined-Arms Command School in 1975, after which he served in the North Caucasus Military District, where he rose to the position of chief of staff of a motorized rifle battalion before he was deployed to Afghanistan in 1980. There he commanded a motorized rifle battalion of the 180th Motorized Rifle Regiment as part of a limited contingent of Soviet troops in the country. After successfully leading his battalion through a dangerous engagement with rebels who tried to ambush them, he was awarded the title Hero of the Soviet Union and the Order of Lenin on 7 May 1982. After his first deployment to Afghanistan he attended the M. V. Frunze Military Academy which he graduated from 1985 before he returned to Afghanistan as a Major. On 16 October 1986 he suffered serious injuries in the Salang Pass, but eventually returned to service. From 1989 to 1991 he studied at the Military Academy of the General Staff and graduated with honors. He was promoted to the rank of Major General in 1991 and to the rank of Lieutenant General in 1997.

== Political career ==
Later he ascended to the Supreme Soviet of the Soviet Union, where he remained for two years while serving on the Military Affairs Committee. In November 1992 Aushev was appointed to lead the provisional administration in Ingushetia, a position he resigned two months later to run in the Ingushetian presidential elections. Being the sole candidate, he won the presidency on 28 February 1993 with 99.99% of the vote, and he was re-elected five years later.

During the First Chechen War as many as 200,000 refugees from Chechnya and neighboring North Ossetia strained Ingushetia's already weak economy and on several occasions, Aushev protested incursions by Russian soldiers, and even threatened to sue the Russian Ministry of Defence for damages inflicted. President Aushev said that his people could not forget how the same Russian armored columns "and the same Defense Minister" (Pavel Grachev) assisted in the destruction of Ingush settlements and the expulsion of Ingush population during the 1992 ethnic conflict in North Ossetia.

He resigned in December 2001 and on 23 May 2002, Murat Zyazikov was elected president of Ingushetia under controversial circumstances. Since then the republic has become more violent.

Then Aushev was elected to the Federation Council of Russia, the upper house of the Russian Parliament in December 1993, a position he resigned from is April 2003. Aushev served as a negotiator on the second day of the Beslan school hostage crisis, convincing the hostage-takers to release 26 nursing women and their infants.

On 30 September 2008, Aushev commented, in his interview to Echo of Moscow radio station, on the increasingly tense situation in Ingushetia, accusing the current authorities of excessive use of force in the republic, leading to the radicalization of the society and threatening to plunge Ingushetia into civil war. The opposition news website Ingushetia.org reported that the Ingush president Murat Zyazikov ordered the republic's television and radio broadcasting center to block Echo of Moscow's signal for the duration of Aushev's appearance.

== Personal life ==
Aushev is married to Aza Ausheva, and has two sons, Ali and Umar, and two daughters, Leila and Lema. Ruslan also had a brother who is unidentified (classified).

== Honours and awards ==
- Hero of the Soviet Union
- Order of Lenin
- Two Orders of the Red Star
- Order for Service to the Homeland in the Armed Forces of the USSR 3rd class
- Medal "For Distinction in Military Service" 1st class
- Jubilee Medal "60 Years of the Armed Forces of the USSR"
- Jubilee Medal "70 Years of the Armed Forces of the USSR"
- Medals "For Impeccable Service" 2nd and 3rd classes

== See also ==
- War Veterans Committee
- Warriors-Internationalists Affairs Committee
