= Unity (Russian political party) =

Russian political party

Unity Единство
- Leader: Sergei Shoigu
- President of Russia: Vladimir Putin
- Founded: 3 October 1999; 27 years ago
- Dissolved: 1 December 2001; 24 years ago
- Split from: Our Home – Russia
- Merged into: United Russia
- Headquarters: Moscow
- Youth wing: Youth Unity
- Ideology: Russian nationalism Centrism (disputed)
- Political position: Right-wing
- Colours: Blue
- Slogan: "Unity is our strength"

Website
- edin.ru (archived)

Unity (Russian: Еди́нство, romanized: Yedinstvo) was a Russian political party that was created on 3 October 1999, supported by Russia’s President Boris Yeltsin, Prime Minister Vladimir Putin and dozens of Russian governors to counter the threat which the Kremlin perceived from the Fatherland-All Russia alliance. It was also unofficially dubbed "Medved’" (the bear) or "Medvedi" (bears), as "MeDvEd" was an acronym of its full name (Mezhregionalnoye Dvizheniye "Edinstvo"; Interregional movement "Unity"). Later the party adopted a brown bear for its symbol.

== History ==
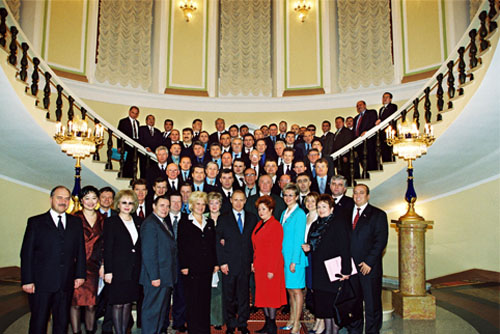
Putin with members of the Unity parliamentary group, 2002

The rise of Unity was meteoric given the short time period it had to create an identity, plan its campaign strategy and carry out its ambitious objectives. The establishment of the movement followed a declaration signed by 39 governors expressing their dissatisfaction with the political battles being fought in Russia. The initial meeting of these governors to form a new electoral movement was held on 24 September 1999. It was at this meeting that Minister of Emergency Situations Sergey Shoigu was selected as Unity’s leader.

Prime Minister Putin immediately pledged support for the new bloc, saying it could help stabilize the political situation in Russia. On 24 November 1999 he told reporters that in his capacity as premier, he "should not define his political preferences" with respect to election blocs but "as an ordinary citizen" he would vote for Unity. The party’s leading candidates in 1999 State Duma elections were Sergey Shoigu, nine-times world wrestling champion Alexander Karelin and former senior police official Alexander Gurov. Unity, backed up by popular support for the Second Chechen War, relied on a campaign of verbal attacks to discredit the Fatherland-All Russia alliance. It was also heavily promoted by the ORT TV channel and especially "Sergey Dorenko's Program".

In the 19 December 1999 State Duma election, Unity received 23.32 percent of the vote and won 72 of 441 seats, just behind the Communist Party of the Russian Federation. Later ten more seats joined the faction. Shoigu remained Emergencies Minister and did not go into the new State Duma. On January 12, 2000 the party elected Boris Gryzlov leader of its faction.

The party supported Vladimir Putin in the 2000 presidential election.

In 2001 the same party has created a formal alliance with three other factions represented in the State Duma: Fatherland – All Russia, the People's Deputy group and Russia's Regions groups, themselves an alliance composed of single-member district deputies who avoided joining one of the party-based factions in that State Duma Convocation. In April of that year the Unity party and the Fatherland – All Russia bloc members (Fatherland and All Russia) decided to unite into a single political party, United Russia.

== Electoral results ==
=== Presidential ===
Election	Candidate	First round		Second round		Result
Election	Candidate	Votes	%	Votes	%	Result
2000	Supported Vladimir Putin	39,740,434	52.94	—N/a		Won

=== State Duma ===
Election	Party leader	Performance					Rank	Government
Election	Party leader	Votes	%	± pp	Seats	+/–	Rank	Government
1999	Sergey Shoigu	15,549,182	23.32	New	73 / 450	New	2nd	Majority

== See also ==
- United Russia
