= Yury Luzhkov =

Russian politician (1936–2019)

- Юрий Лужков
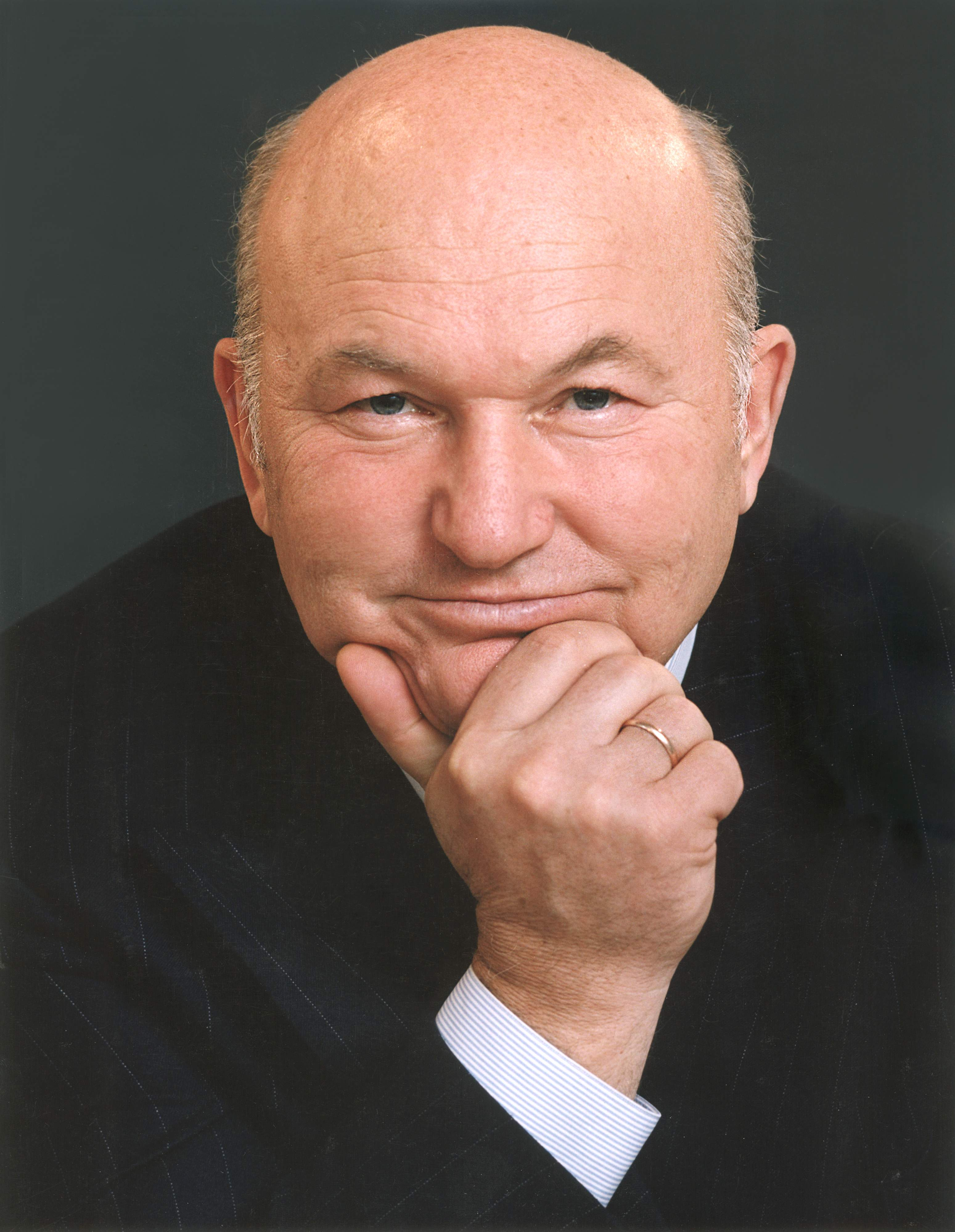

2nd Mayor of Moscow
- In office 6 June 1992 – 28 September 2010
- Preceded by: Gavriil Popov
- Succeeded by: Vladimir Resin (acting); Sergey Sobyanin

Chairman of United Russia
- In office 1 December 2001 – 27 November 2004 Serving with Sergei Shoigu and Mintimer Shaimiev
- Preceded by: Party established
- Succeeded by: Boris Gryzlov

Deputy Chairman of the Committee on the Operational Management of the Soviet Economy
- In office 24 August 1991 – 29 October 1991 Serving with Grigory Yavlinsky and Arkady Volsky
- Premier: Ivan Silayev

Personal details
- Born: Yury Mikhaylovich Luzhkov; 21 September 1936 Moscow, Russian SFSR, Soviet Union
- Died: 10 December 2019 (aged 83) Munich, Germany
- Resting place: Novodevichy Cemetery
- Party: CPSU (1968–1991); Fatherland (1998–2002); United Russia (2001–2010)
- Spouses: Marina Bashilova (m. 1958; died 1989) Yelena Baturina (m. 1991)
- Children: 4
- Education: Gubkin Moscow Petrochemical & Gas Industry Institute

Yury Mikhailovich Luzhkov (Russian: Юрий Михайлович Лужков, IPA: [ˈjʉrʲɪj mʲɪˈxajləvʲɪtɕ lʊˈʂkof]; 21 September 1936 – 10 December 2019) was a Russian politician who served as mayor of Moscow from 1992 to 2010. Before the election of Gavriil Popov as the first mayor of Moscow, he also headed the capital in 1990–1991 as chairman of the Mosgorispolkom. He was the vice-chairman and one of the founders of the ruling United Russia party. During Luzhkov's time, Moscow's economy expanded and he presided over large construction projects in the city, including the building of a new financial district. At the same time, he was accused of corruption, bulldozing historic buildings, and poor handling of traffic, as well as the city's smog crisis during the 2010 Russian wildfires. On 28 September 2010, Luzhkov was fired from his post by a decree issued by then-President Dmitry Medvedev.

== Early life ==
Yury Mikhailovich Luzhkov was born on 21 September 1936 in Moscow. His father, Mikhail Andreyevich Luzhkov, moved to Moscow from a small village in Tver Oblast in the 1930s.

== Mayoral career ==
In April 1990, the new chairman of the Moscow City Council, Gavriil Popov, on the recommendation of Boris Yeltsin, nominated Luzhkov for the post of chairman of the Mosgorispolkom.

Following the August coup Luzhkov was appointed on 24 August 1991, without leaving the post of vice-mayor of Moscow, one of three deputy heads of the Committee on the Operational Management of the Soviet economy, which was created to replace the Cabinet of Ministers, which had supported the coup, and became the last government of the Soviet Union. He was responsible for questions related to the agro-industrial complex, trade, foreign economic relations and the social sphere. Two months later it became known that Luzhkov left the committee due to employment as vice mayor.

=== Architecture ===
Many old Soviet landmarks, such as Rossiya Hotel or Voentorg, were reconstructed or demolished, as well as several old buildings around the Kadashi Church in the proximity of the Moscow Kremlin. Many neighbourhoods, like Zamoskvorechye, were dramatically changed. Sculptor Zurab Tsereteli enjoyed Luzhkov's personal support in setting many of his works over the city.

In 1999, in order to improve the housing conditions of Moscovites, Yury Luzhkov initiated a major demolition programme to replace Moscow’s old five-story apartment blocks that were unsuitable for renovation because of the outdated technology used during their construction. 1,722 of them were to be razed by 2010. The authorities stipulated that the apartment blocks could only be torn down and replaced after its residents had been moved into new housing.

=== Registration ===
Luzhkov's rationale for permanent living place (propiska) registration was that Moscow's city infrastructure could not handle a rapidly growing population. Some of the most blatant limitations were removed by the Supreme Court and the Constitutional Court after a long fight with Luzhkov's lawyers, making the registration process somewhat simpler. In 2003 Privacy International awarded Luzhkov the runner-up position in its Most Egregiously Stupid Award for the propiska rules.

=== Popularity ===
In April 2001, 63% of Moscow residents had a good or very good view of Mayor Luzhkov. However, Luzhkov's ratings steadily declined, and according to the latest poll from October 2009, only 36% of Muscovites viewed him positively.

=== Allegations of corruption ===
Allegations of wrongdoing by Luzhkov had been made before, but he had been notable for never having lost a libel suit in his career, including against Boris Nemtsov, the newspaper Kommersant, and The New York Times.

Despite the lawsuit history between the two, after Luzhkov’s dismissal Boris Nemtsov said: ‘I can’t help feeling that the current investigation is more of a revenge against Luzhkov and Baturina, and not an attempt to restore a lawful situation. I am absolutely convinced that the main task here is raiding with the help of the State. The goal is to take Baturina's business from her for a pittance. And criminal cases are just the way to do it. It's disgusting to take part in marauding, and I will never do it. Thus, the story of my conflict with Baturina is from now on completely over."

=== Dismissal ===
Luzhkov was dismissed by President Medvedev on 28 September 2010, after returning from a holiday in Austria, citing "loss of trust". Pundits had been predicting Luzhkov's imminent ousting for years. The September 2010 dismissal followed weeks of speculation regarding Luzhkov's position, caused by his questioning of Medvedev's leadership. Government-controlled television channels had run programs criticizing Luzhkov's handling of the 2010 summer peat fires and accused him and his wife of corruption. Some observers have seen this as being part of a struggle between Medvedev and then-Prime Minister Putin. Luzhkov officially declared that he had left the United Russia party. Luzhkov had sent a letter to the President on 27 September criticizing Medvedev's policy and his administration's actions. According to the President's press-secretary Medvedev read the letter after the decision had been made but it would not have affected that decision in any case.

== Post-mayoral activities ==
On 1 October 2010 Luzhkov was appointed Dean of the Faculty of Management of major cities of the International University in Moscow. The order for appointment was signed by the president of the university, former mayor (and Luzhkov's predecessor as mayor) of Moscow Gavriil Popov. The faculty of management of large cities was established in 2002 on the initiative of Luzhkov, in the same year Luzhkov became the scientific leader of this faculty and an honorary professor at the university. On the same day, ex-mayor Luzhkov left his former workplace.

On 21 September 2016, Luzhkov's 80th birthday, Russian President Vladimir Putin signed a decree awarding him the Order of Merit of the Fatherland, 4th degree "for active public work".

In 2010, Luzhkov became head of Veedern, the agricultural enterprise with the territory of 5,500 hectare in the North-West of Russia. He established and managed a large farmstead that was active in horse and sheep breeding, grain growing and cereal production, cheese making, etc. In 2017, the farm produced a total of 10,000 tons of grain (barley, wheat, buckwheat), and its buckwheat harvest covered 2/3 of the regional need.

The farm employed more than 100 locals, offered highly competitive wages and social support. Luzhkov claimed that his main goal as a farmer was the creation of a self-sustainable and business efficient enterprise, developing and promoting to the regional and federal authorities a system of support for private agricultural enterprises. After his death, the farm was inherited by Luzhkov’s younger son Alexander.

== In Russia's politics ==
In 1998, as Boris Yeltsin's political troubles grew partly because of the August economic crisis, Luzhkov formed his own national political faction, Otechestvo (Fatherland), to serve as his base for the upcoming presidential election. Otechestvo had the support of many powerful regional politicians, and it gained further support when it merged with another party, Vsya Rossiya (All Russia) to form Otechestvo-Vsya Rossiya. Many observers of Russian politics believed that Luzhkov and his new ally, former prime minister Yevgeniy Primakov, would be likely to displace both Yeltsin and his inner circle in the parliamentary and presidential elections due to be held in late 1999 and mid-2000, respectively.

However, Yeltsin appointed Vladimir Putin as Prime Minister in August 1999. While virtually unknown when first appointed, Putin rapidly gained popular support due to a hard-line law and order image and the backing of powerful state-owned and state-allied media and economic interests. Supporters of the prime minister, Luzhkov and his party integrated with the pro-Putin Unity party into the single United Russia following the autumn 1999 Duma campaign, and endorsed Putin in the 2000 presidential elections, which he won easily. Luzhkov remained a co-chairman of United Russia.

== Criticism ==
Luzhkov was accused of brutal suppression of opposition protests, and he was widely condemned for leaving Moscow during the smog crisis resulting from the 2010 Russian wildfires. He is also blamed for traffic congestion in the city.

== Controversy ==
In 2002, Luzhkov proposed returning to Lubyanka Square the fifteen-ton iron statue of Felix Dzerzhinsky, founder of the Soviet Cheka. The statue was removed after the failure of the attempted coup against the Soviet government of Mikhail Gorbachev in 1991. Opponents of the proposal collected the signatures of 114,000 Moscow residents against the statue's return.

=== Stance on Sevastopol ===
In 1996 Luzhkov, hoping to advance his political stature on a national level, became the main advocate for a claim to the city of Sevastopol in Ukraine. In December, the Russian Federation Council passed a resolution officially claiming the city, affecting negotiations between President Boris Yeltsin and Ukraine's President Leonid Kuchma over possession of the Black Sea Fleet (housed at Sevastopol) and helping spur Ukraine to seek a relationship with NATO.

On 12 May 2008 Luzhkov was banned from entering Ukraine by the Security Service (SBU) after his statement concerning the legal status of Sevastopol:

In 1954 the city of Sevastopol was not included into the Oblast, the territory, which was transferred to Ukraine by Nikita Khrushchev. We state that this issue remained unresolved.

=== Destruction of the Rechnik neighbourhood ===
It was Luzhkov who controversially ordered the destruction of houses built in the Rechnik neighbourhood of Moscow. According to an interview published in the Moskovsky Komsomolets, Luzkhov said that the residents were squatting on land in a "protected environmental zone." Residents claimed that Soviet-era permits to the land, which was set aside as a gardening collective in the 1950s, gave them de facto title over the land the houses were built on and many of these titles were bought or inherited from the original owners; Luzhkov was accused of lobbying the interests of building companies. However, the City Hall claimed that no permissions for private house building on that land were given since the 1950s and that the residents could never claim amnesty because of that. Nevertheless, Luzhkov stated that the city was ready to provide full compensation by offering other land plots in the vicinity of Moscow for veterans of World War II who lived in Rechnik since Soviet times.

=== Honouring Stalin ===
In 2010, Luzhkov made public his plans to honour Soviet leader Joseph Stalin with ten posters of him in the city of Moscow, for the first time in around fifty years after Nikita Khrushchev's criticism of Stalin-period policies. Liberal critics expressed concern that Stalin was being rehabilitated as memories of his "reign of terror" faded.

== Personal life ==
Luzhkov married his first wife, Marina Bashilova, in 1958, and had two sons with her, Mikhail and Alexander. Bashilova died from liver cancer in 1989. He met his second wife, businesswoman Yelena Baturina, 27 years his junior, in 1987. They married in 1991 and had two daughters, Elena (born 1992) and Olga (born 1994), and owned a home in the affluent Kensington area of London, purchased in 2013 through an offshore company domiciled in Gibraltar.

Luzhkov frequently appeared in public at different festivals and celebrations, and was an enthusiastic promoter of Moscow. His hobbies included tennis and beekeeping. His support for physical fitness was well known, and a statue of the mayor in tennis garb was created by Zurab Tsereteli.

=== Personal views ===
Luzhkov was allegedly a devoted Orthodox Christian believer, often appearing at Christmas and Easter liturgies. A BBC documentary made during the late 1990s questioned this, asserting he was not an Orthodox Christian. When asked why he supported the Church, he replied that he supported its moral teachings. He was friendly with Patriarch Alexy II. In 2005 he was given an award from the International Fund of Unity of Orthodox Christians.

Luzhkov was critical of homosexuality and issued several bans on the Moscow Pride parade, organised by Nikolay Alexeyev. Gay activists accused him of homophobia, and sent their appeals to the European Court of Human Rights complaining the breach of Freedom of Assembly, which is granted in the European Convention on Human Rights.

Luzhkov was known as an enthusiastic advocate of the Northern river reversal project, which he believed would solve the water problem of Central Asia and earn money for Russia.

=== Death ===
Luzhkov died on 10 December 2019 in Munich, Germany at the Klinikum der Universität München where he underwent invasive heart surgery. Luzhkov was administered anesthesia and died from subsequent anaphylactic shock.

== Honours and awards ==
Russia

- Order "For Merit to the Fatherland";
  - 1st class (21 September 2006) – for outstanding contribution to strengthening Russian statehood, and socio-economic development of the city
  - 2nd class (14 November 1995) – for services to the state, his great personal contribution to the implementation of reforms aimed at restructuring the city's economy, the success of the reconstruction of the historical city center, the revival of the temples, the construction of the memorial Victory Poklonnaya Hill
  - 3rd class
  - 4th class – for active public work
- Order of Military Merit (1 October 2003) – for his great personal contribution to improving combat readiness and to ensure the defence of the Russian Federation
- Order of Honour (19 August 2000) – for outstanding contribution to the preservation and restoration of cultural and architectural monuments of Moscow
- Medal "Defender of a Free Russia" (9 November 1993) – for performing his civic duty in defence of democracy and constitutional order on 19–21 August 1991
- State Prize of the Russian Federation
- Medal "In Commemoration of the 850th Anniversary of Moscow"
- Medal "In Commemoration of the 300th Anniversary of Saint Petersburg"
- Honoured Transport Worker of the Russian Federation

Soviet Union

- Order of Lenin
- Order of the Red Banner of Labour
- Medal "For Strengthening of Brotherhood in Arms"
- USSR State Prize

Russian regions

- Order of Akhmad Kadyrov (2006, Chechen Republic)
- Medal "For Services to the Chechen Republic" (2005)
- Order of the Republic (2001, Tuva) – for the fruitful cooperation and personal contribution to the socio-economic development of the
- Medal "60 years of education of the Kaliningrad region" (2006)
- Order "For Services to the Kaliningrad region" (Kaliningrad Region, 16 January 2009) – for outstanding services to the Kaliningrad region, related to making a large contribution to its socio-economic development and a significant contribution to protecting the rights of citizens

Foreign

- Order of St. Mesrop Mashtots (Armenia)
- Order of the Friendship of Peoples (Belarus) (16 February 2005) – for his great personal contribution to strengthening economic, scientific, technological and cultural ties between Belarus and the Russian Federation [98]
- Order of Francysk Skaryna (Belarus)
- Medal of Francysk Skaryna (Belarus, 19 September 1996) – for his significant contribution to strengthening the friendly relations between Belarus and the Russian Federation
- Jubilee Medal "50 Tynga zhyl" ("50 virgin") (Kazakhstan)
- Medal "Astana" (Kazakhstan)
- Order "Danaker" (Kyrgyzstan, 27 February 2006) – for his significant contribution to strengthening friendship and cooperation, developing trade and economic relations between the Kyrgyz Republic and the Russian Federation
- Order of Prince Yaroslav the Wise, 5th class (Ukraine, 23 January 2004) – for personal contribution to the development of cooperation between Ukraine and the Russian Federation
- Order of the Polar Star (Mongolia)
- Chevalier of the National Order of the Cedar (Lebanon)
- Bavarian Order of Merit (Germany, 2006)
- State Prize for peace and progress of the First President of the Republic of Kazakhstan (2003)

Religious organizations

- Order of St. Prince Vladimir Equal, 1st class (November 1993) – for participation in the restoration of the Cathedral of Our Lady of Kazan icon in Red Square
- Order of St. Sergius, 1st class (Russian Orthodox Church)
- Order of Holy Prince Daniel of Moscow, 1st class (Russian Orthodox Church)
- Order of Saint Righteous Grand Duke Dmitry Donskoy, 1st class (Russian Orthodox Church)
- Order of St. Innocent Metropolitan of Moscow and Kolomna, 1st class (Russian Orthodox Church, 2009)
- Order of St. Andrei Rublev, 1st class (Russian Orthodox Church, 2009)
- Order of St. Macarius, Metropolitan of Moscow, 2nd class (Russian Orthodox Church)
- Order of St. Sava, 1st class (Serbian Orthodox Church)
- Order "Al-Fahr" (Medal of Honour) (Russian Council of Muftis)

Departmental awards

- Medal of Anatoly Koni (Ministry of Justice)
- Gold Medal of the Ministry of Agriculture of Russia "for contribution to the development of agro-industrial complex of Russia"
- Medal "Participant humanitarian relief operations" (Russian Emergencies Ministry)
- Golden Olympic Order (IOC, 1998)
- Medal "100 years of trade unions" (FNPR)

Community Awards

- International Leonardo Prize (1996)
- Badge of Honor (Order) "Sports Glory of Russia", 1st class ("Komsomolskaya Pravda" newspaper and the board of the Russian Olympic Committee, November 2002) – for organizing large-scale construction of sports facilities in Moscow

As part of the celebrations marking the 25th anniversary of the great consecration of the main Orthodox church – the Cathedral of Christ the Savior – an exhibition dedicated to Yuri Luzhkov and his significant contribution to the revival of both the Cathedral of Christ the Savior and other temples Moscow, as well as to the general development of the city in the 1990s–2010s, opened in the cathedral museum hall.

== Yury Luzhkov Foundation ==
The Yury Luzhkov Foundation was established in September 2020 with the purpose of preserving his memory, work and accomplishments, as well as popularizing his socio-political, literary and scientific heritage. The memorial work of the Foundation was endorsed by a special order of President Vladimir Putin. The Foundation strives to support and develop the socio-cultural and philanthropic initiatives that continue the line of Yury Luzhkov’s work to benefit the citizens of Moscow and Russia, with a particular focus on involvement of younger people into developing solutions for contemporary urbanistic problems.

=== Projects and programs ===
An award for prominent theatre management was established in the name of Yuri Luzhkov by the National Theatre Award “Crystal Turandot” and first awarded in June 2021. At the festival the Foundation has established a special prize to the “Young Innovator” and awarded it annually.

Long-term cooperation has been established with the International Festival of Scientific and Technological Development for Children and Youth. At the Festival, the Yuri Luzhkov Prize to "Young Innovators" is annually granted to the youngest and most talented inventor among those who bring their projects to the festival.

Annual scholarship and grant programmes have been established with Moscow universities to honour Luzhkov’s contribution to industry, science and education, including his alma mater Gubkin Russian State University of Oil and Gas.

The foundation is an ongoing supporter of the educational campaign “All-Russian Economic Dictation” developed by the Free Economic Society of Russia and pays special attention to supporting young economists: the youngest author of the dictation tasks receives a special award from the Yury Luzhkov Foundation.

Together with the Moscow Sports Department and the Russian and Moscow Tennis Federations, the Foundation holds the annual all-Russian youth competition “Tennis Tournament in Memory of Yury Luzhkov".

Other sports events supported by the foundation include the annual summer Moscow festival of street sports The BOWL and an amateur tennis tournament “Leather Cap”.

The Yuri Luzhkov Foundation consistently works on collecting and systematizing, publishing and popularizing the social, political, literary and scientific heritage of Yu. M. Luzhkov. The archives collected by the Foundation are intended for unimpeded and free use by the general public.

Political offices
Preceded by Gavriil Popov	Mayor of Moscow; 1992–2010	Succeeded by Vladimir Resin (acting)
