= Mayoralty of Sergey Sobyanin =

Mayoralty in Moscow since 2010

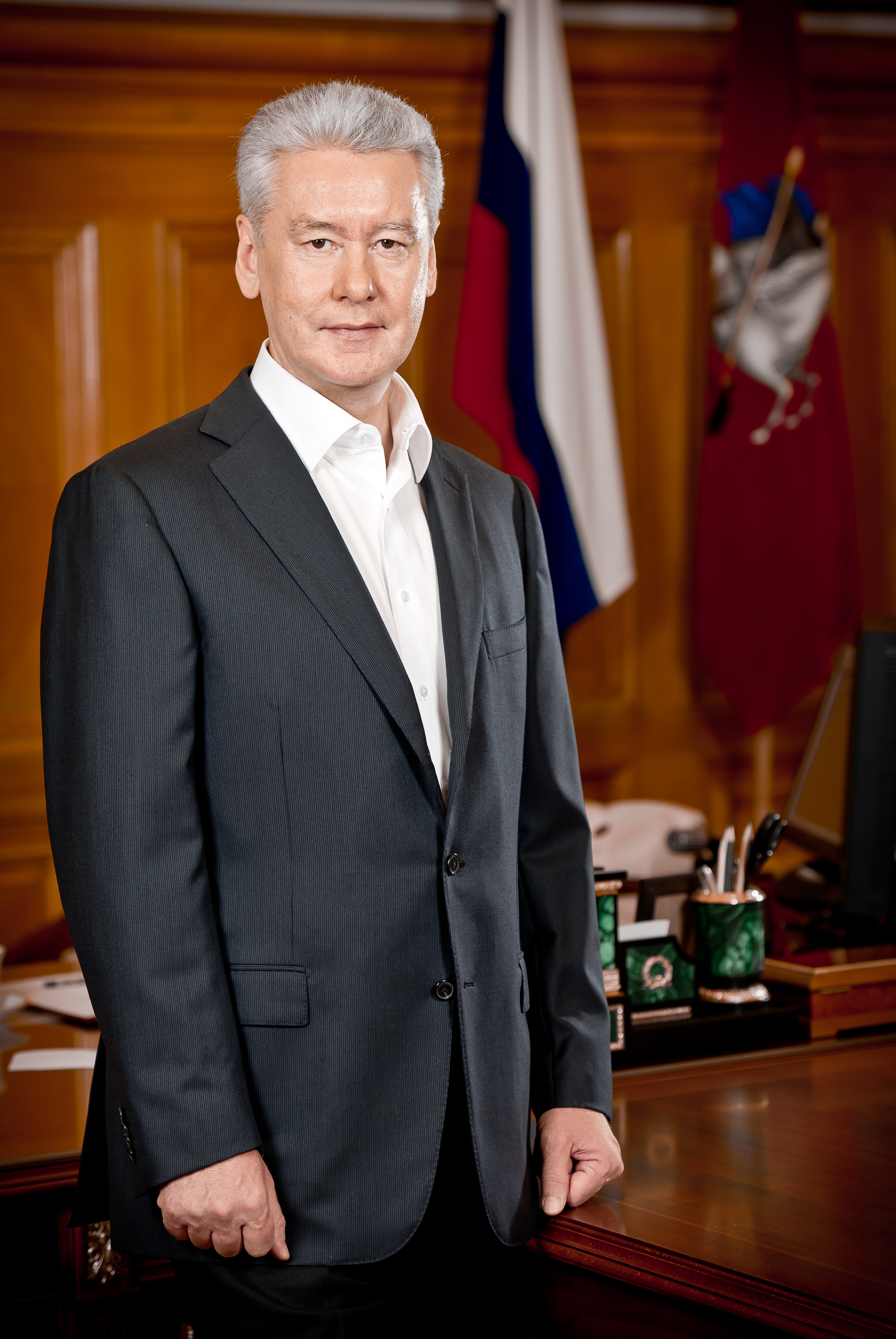
- Mayoralty of Sergey Sobyanin; 21 October 2010 – present
- Mayor: Sergey Sobyanin
- Party: United Russia
- Election: 2010, 2013, 2018, 2023
- Seat: Government of Moscow
- Coat of Arms of Moscow

Sergey Sobyanin is serving as the third Mayor of Moscow since 21 October 2010.

== Elections ==
=== 2010 appointment ===
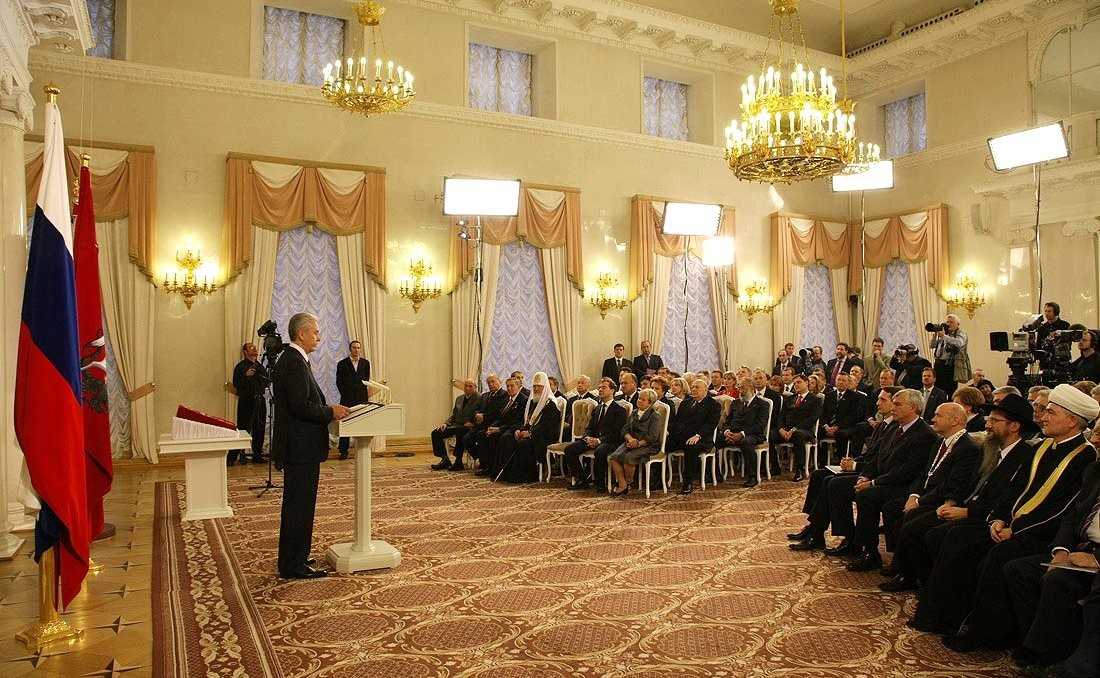
2010 inauguration of Sergey Sobyanin

Until 2012, there were no direct elections of governors in Russia (including mayors and governors of Federal cities). Regional heads were appointed by the President of Russia with the consent of the regional Parliament.

On 28 September 2010, President Dmitry Medvedev sacked Moscow Mayor Yury Luzhkov "in connection with loss of trust of the President". On 9 October, Sobyanin was included in the list of four candidates for Mayor of Moscow, proposed to the President. The other candidates were Lyudmila Shvetsova, Igor Levitin and Valery Shantsev. On October 15, Medvedev nominated Sobyanin to the Moscow City Duma. October 21, the deputies of the Moscow City Duma by secret ballot (32 MPs voted favor and 2 — against) approved Sobyanin as Mayor for the next five years.

=== 2013 re–election ===
On 5 June 2013, Sergey Sobyanin asked President Vladimir Putin to resign in order to hold a snap election. On the same day, Vladimir Putin signed a decree on Sobyanin's resignation and the same decree appointed him acting Mayor of Moscow to hold early election. Sergey Sobyanin chose to go to the election not from the United Russia party, of which he is a member, but in the status of self-nominated, in connection with which he had not only to overcome the municipal filter (110 signatures of municipal deputies), but also to collect signatures of 70 thousand Muscovites.

On 8 September he was re-elected as Mayor with 51.37% of votes and on 12 September Sobyanin was again sworn in as Mayor of Moscow.

=== 2018 re–election ===
In October 2017, Sergey Sobyanin announced his intention to run for re-election. As in 2013, Sobyanin again decided to run as a self-nominee.

On 8 September he was again re-elected Mayor for a new term with 70.17%. The inauguration will take place on 18 September in the Concert Hall of Zaryadye Park.

=== 2023 mayoral campaign ===
Initially, it was assumed that the term, which began in 2018, would be the last for Sergeн Sobyanin as Mayor of Moscow, since the Federal Law on Regional Authorities in force at that time set limits of two terms for the heads of federal subjects. However, in 2021, a new Federal Law on the Organization of Public Authorities in the Regions was adopted, which lacks norms limiting the number of terms for the heads of the federal subjects.

On 9 June 2023, Sergey Sobyanin announced his candidacy for the 2023 Moscow mayoral election. This time, Sobyanin decided to run as a candidate from the United Russia party, and not as an independent candidate as before. On the same day, Sobyanin was officially nominated by United Russia for mayor.

== Transport policy ==
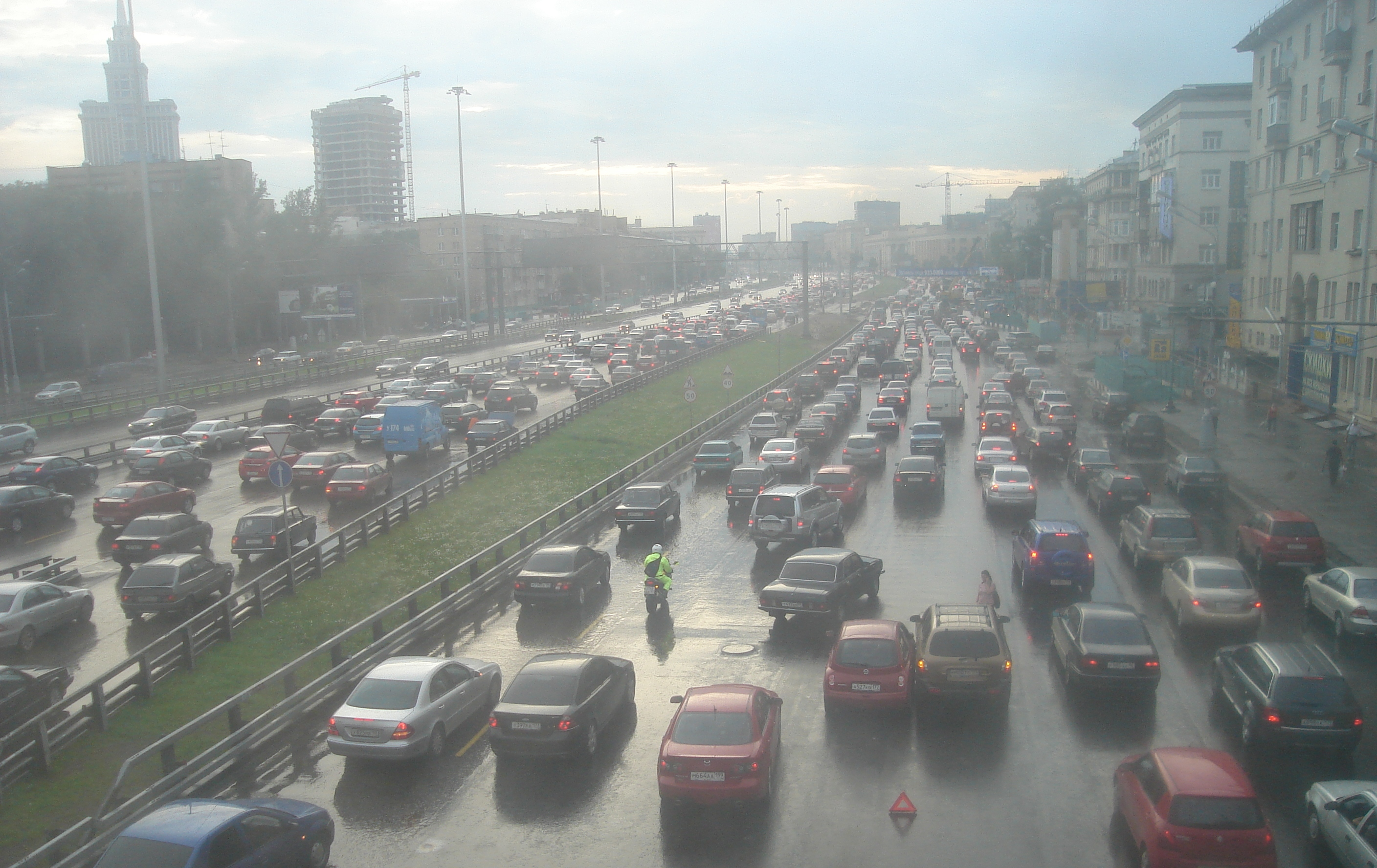
Traffic congestion on Leningradsky Avenue

Immediately after taking office, Sergey Sobyanin described the city's transport system crisis as "the most visible imbalance in Moscow's development". Uncontrolled motorization has led to the fact that by 2011 in Moscow was registered 4 million cars, in 2013 the city took first place in the world in the length of traffic congestions.

According to the mayor's office and experts, the most effective strategy for solving problems is to reduce the number of cars traveling to the streets by 500 thousand. To do this, it was planned to increase the price of owning a car and at the same time expand the possibilities of public transport.

Sergey Sobyanin advocated the introduction of paid parking in the center of Moscow. The first paid parking zone was launched in November 2013, in December 2014 it expanded to the borders of the Third Ring Road, and also appeared on 25 streets outside. After expanding the paid parking area in December 2016, it covers more than 1,200 streets and 47 districts of the city. The introduction and expansion of the paid parking zone has repeatedly caused protests of citizens: in the autumn of 2015, 12 protest rallies were held, in December 2016, an action against parking policy was held on Pushkinskaya Square. According to Yandex analysts, the expansion of the paid parking zone to the borders of the Third Ring Road accelerated the movement of cars by 7-10% between the Garden Ring and the Third Ring.

According to TomTom, the manufacturer of navigation devices, in 2015, Moscow moved along the length of traffic jams to fifth place in the world, and the road load index in Moscow decreased to 44% (in 2012 — first place and 57% respectively). In 2017, Moscow was excluded from the top 10 cities with the busiest roads according to the TomTom rating. Time losses due to traffic jams decreased from 57 minutes per day in 2012 to 43 minutes per day in 2016. At the same time, the average speed of the traffic increased from 45 km/h in 2010 to 51 km/h in 2016.

=== Public transport ===
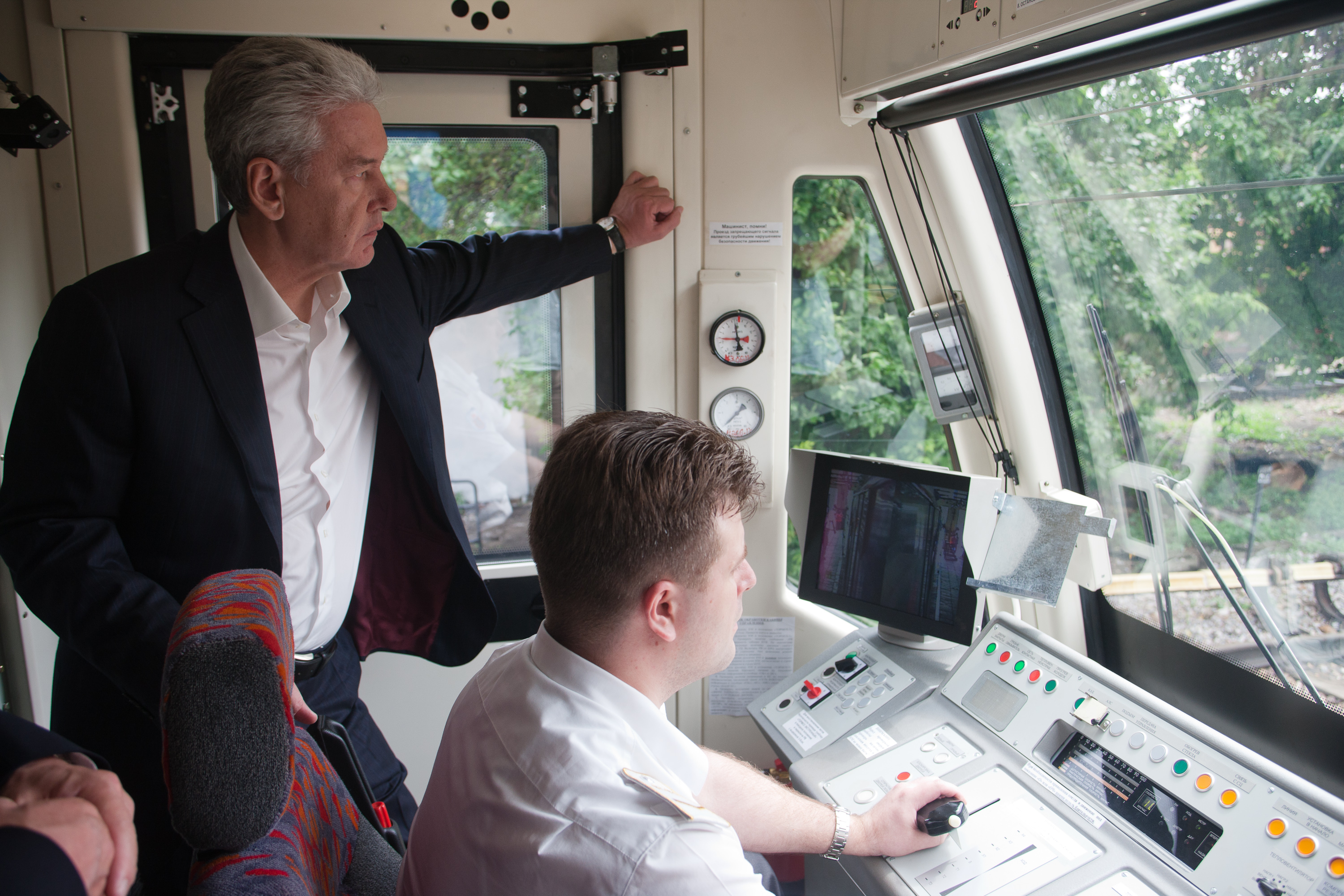
Sergey Sobyanin in the cab of the subway train driver

In 2011, Sergey Sobyanin signed a decree on procurement for the 2011-2012 year, more than 2,100 buses in new modifications, and since 2011 they have been implemented the program implementation of Bus rapid transit systems on dedicated lanes for public transport.

In 2012, Sobyanin announced plans to build 70 new Metro stations. The adopted program for the development of the Moscow Metro until 2020, worth about 1 trillion rubles, provides for the construction of 76 stations and more than 150 km of lines. Several new stations (Zhulebino, Novokosino, Kotelniki and Rumyantsevo) are located outside the Moscow Ring Road. The program includes both the extension of existing lines and the construction of new ones, including a Large Circle Line.

In October 2016, in the central districts of the city was launched the "Magistral" — a program to optimize the route network of public transport and the reorganization of routes of main, inter-district and social importance.

Experts and citizens have been criticized for the policy of closing trolleybus routes in the city center since 2014. In the course of work on the improvement program "My street" removed the contact network, and the routes were reduced. With the launch of the "Magistral", a number of trolleybus routes were replaced by buses. The media reported on the plans until 2020 to further reduce trolleybus traffic. In January 2017, a rally for the preservation of the trolleybus network, which was attended by about 900 people, took place at Suvorovskaya Square.

According to official data, in 2016, 600 million (12%) passengers used public transport more than in 2010; passenger traffic of economically active citizens increased by 63% compared to 2010. At the same time, the Moscow Department of Transport said that ground transportation has become better to comply with the schedule (accuracy of 94% in 2015 against 76% in 2010).

By 2023, Moscow had one of the largest fleet of electric buses in the world, with over 1,000 electric buses in operation.

==== Moscow Central Circle ====
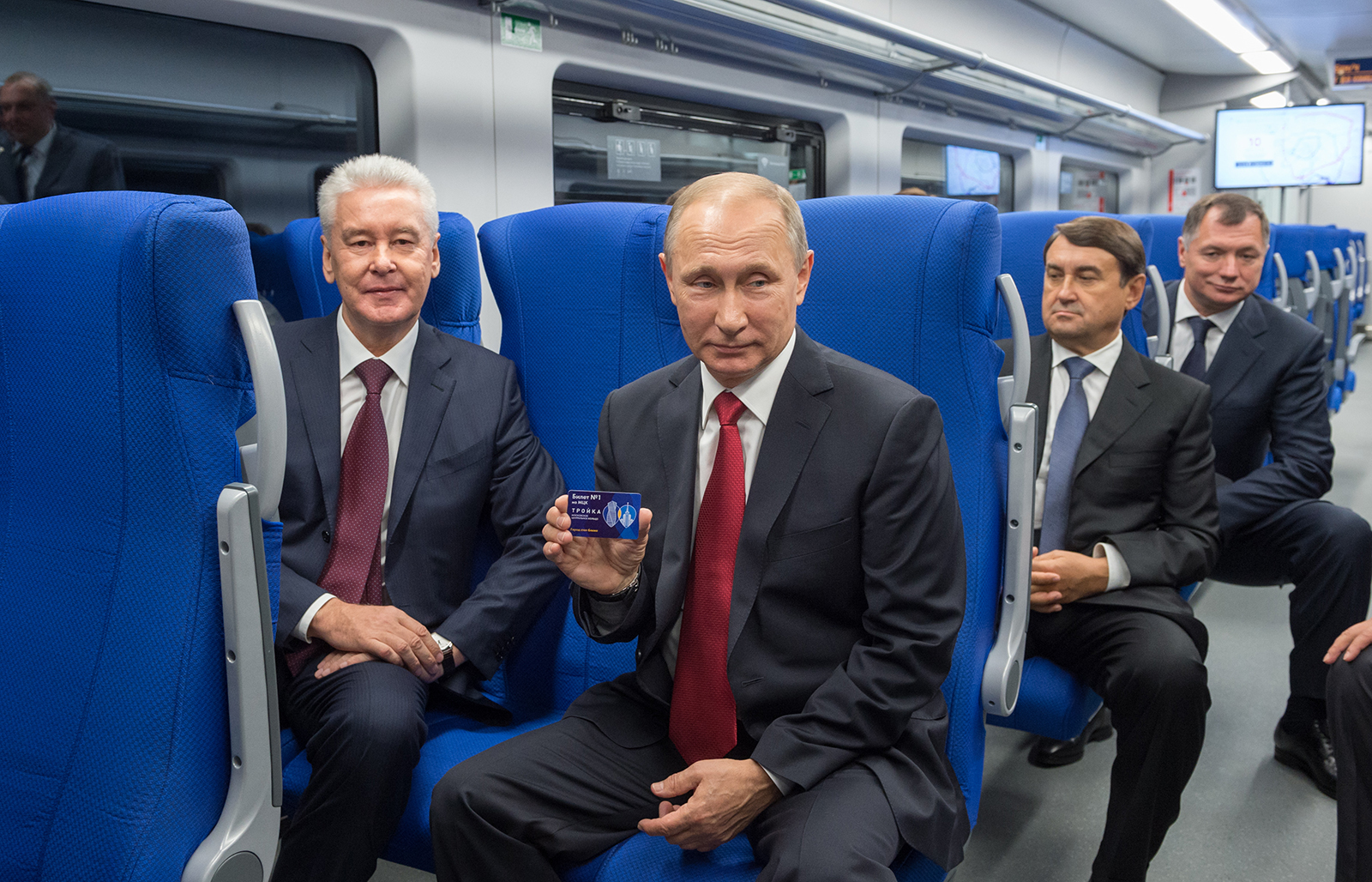
Sergey Sobyanin and Vladimir Putin on the opening of the MCC

On 10 September 2016, on the City Day, in the presence of Mayor Sergey Sobyanin and President Vladimir Putin, passenger traffic of electric trains was opened on the Moscow Central Circle (MCC), which was previously used as a railway line for freight transport. MCC includes 31 stations with transfers to 10 metro lines and 9 radial railway lines. The MCC is integrated with the Moscow metro for fare collection and transfers, which creates a single system with the metro.

==== Moscow Central Diameters ====
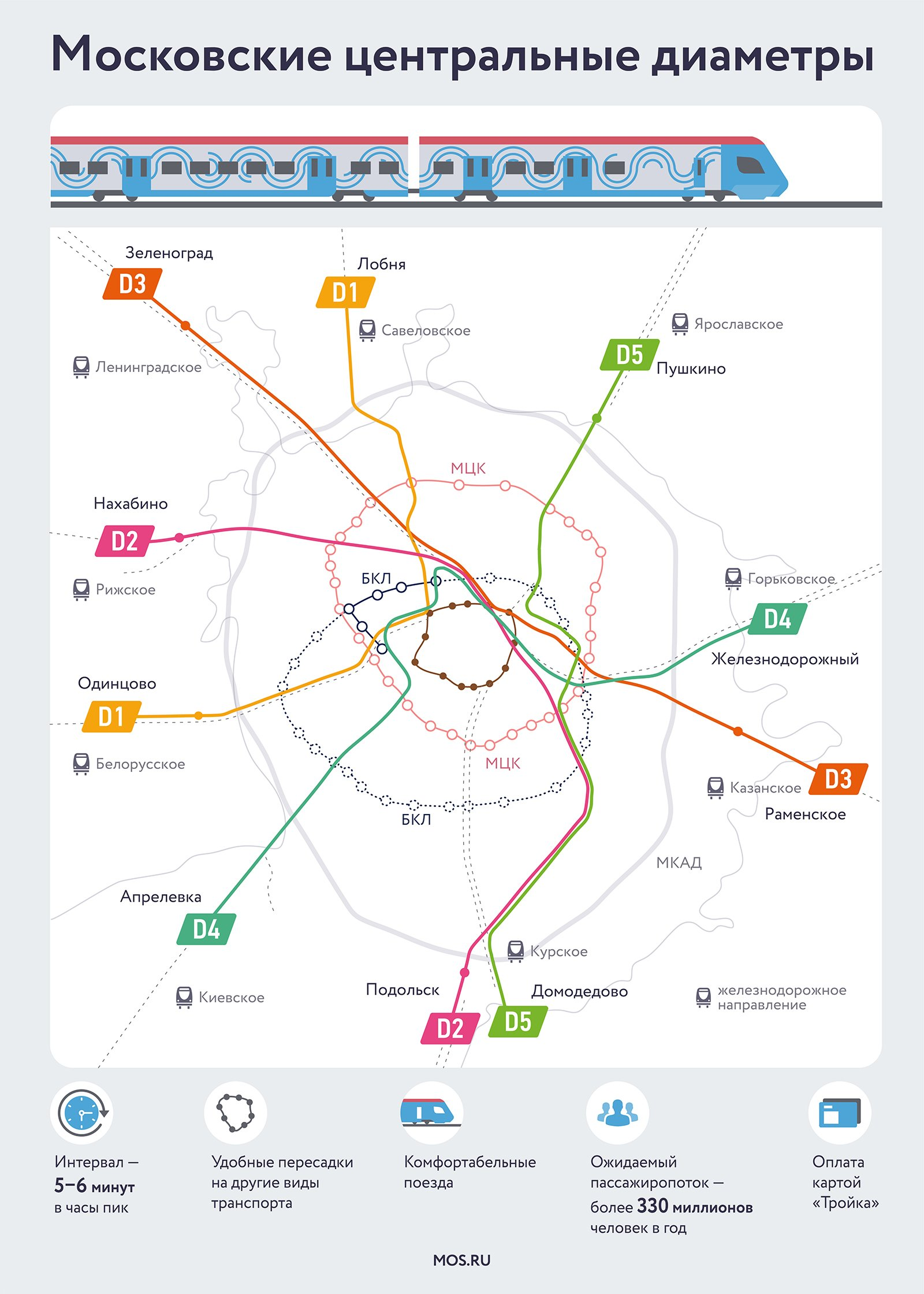
MCD map

In October 2017, Sobyanin announced that he was discussing with Russian Railways and the Ministry of Transport a project to create through railway lines based on existing ones.

On 15 November 2017, at a working meeting of Russian President Vladimir Putin with Moscow mayor Sergei Sobyanin and head of Russian Railways Oleg Belozerov, the project, called "Moscow Central Diameters" (MCD), was presented in detail for the first time. The project was supported by the President and recognized by him as one of the priorities in the Moscow transport hub.

The essence of the project is to create routes connecting cities near Moscow, passing through Moscow. The system is based on existing railway lines that previously ended in Moscow. The system is integrated with the Moscow metro and has a single fare payment system.

On 19 December 2017, Russian Transport Minister Maxim Sokolov, Sobyanin, Moscow Oblast Governor Andrey Vorobyov and Russian Railways President Oleg Belozerov signed a schedule for the implementation of the first stage of the project at a meeting of the Coordination Council for the development of the transport system in Moscow and Moscow Oblast.

The first two routes were launched on 21 November 2019.

=== Road construction ===
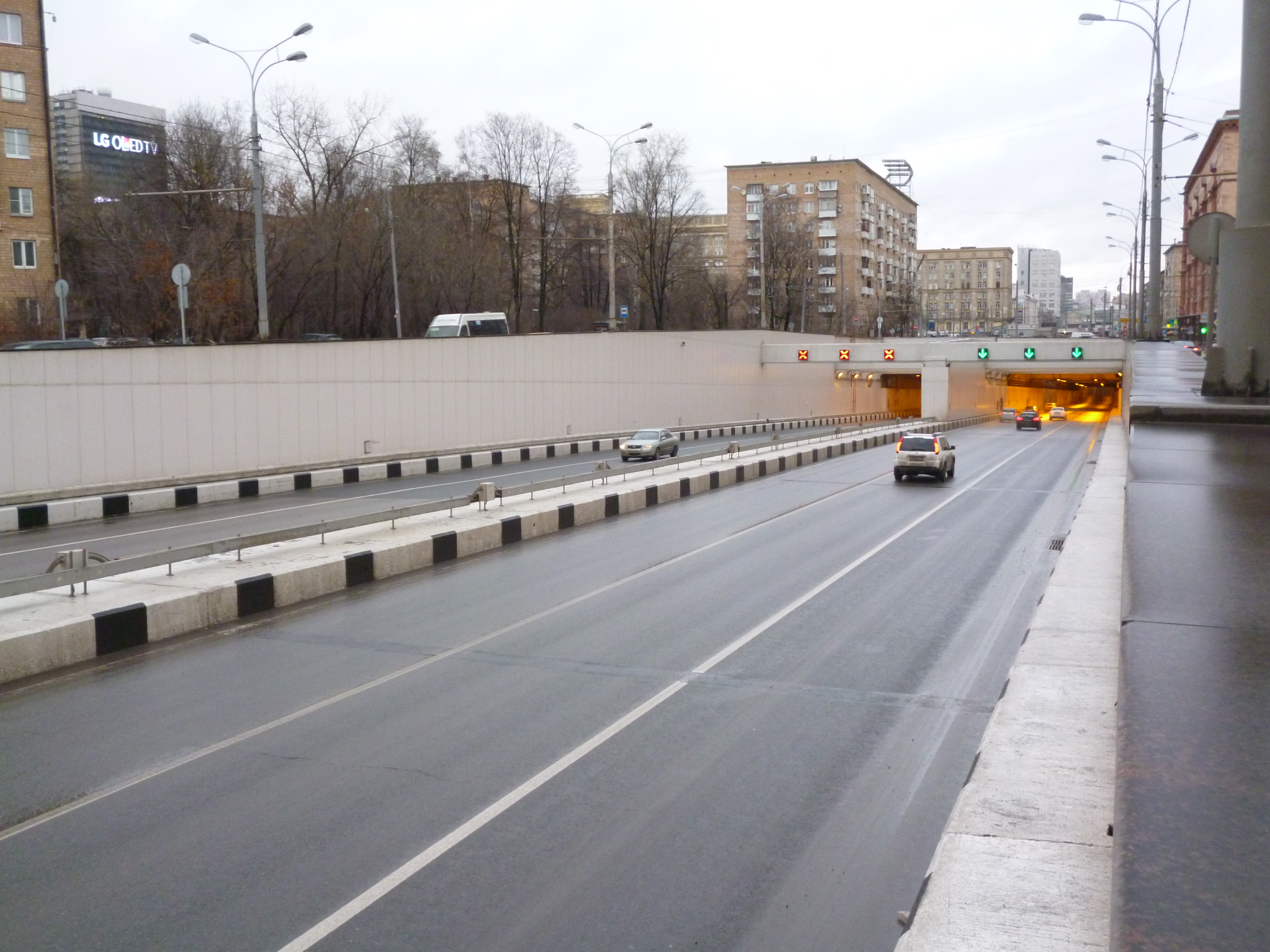
The Alabyanо-Baltiysky Tunnel was opened in 2015. Its construction was carried out for 10 years.

With the arrival of Sobyanin in the capital intensified work on road repairs. In 2011, the mayor announced the need every 3 years to completely shift the asphalt on the roads, while the contractors under the terms of the contract give the city a three-year guarantee at their own expense. The first three-year cycle of repair using new asphalt-bitumen mixtures was carried out in 2011-2013 (before that, the coating was repaired every 7.5 years).

In 2011–2015, 400 km of new roads were built in Moscow. In particular, the reconstruction of Varshavskoye, Kashirskoye, Mozhaiskoye, Leningradskoye, Yaroslavskoye highways, Balaklavsky Avenue and several interchanges on the Moscow Ring Road were carried out. In December 2015, the ten-year construction of the Alabiano-Baltiysky Tunnel was completed. From 2010 to 2015, the authorities have completed the construction or reconstruction of 12 interchanges of the Moscow Ring Road and radial routes.

Sobyanin cancelled the Fourth Ring Road, a massive road construction project that had been started under Yury Luzhkov, which would have involved tremendous land acquisition costs. Instead, the Government of Moscow has begun the construction of two chord tracks, which will link the departing highways in the middle part of the city and will have direct access to the Moscow Ring Road. The North-Eastern Chord will run from the understudy of the Leningradsky Highway to the Veshnyaki-Lyubertsy junction. North-West Chord - from Dmitrovskoye to Skolkovskoye highways. It is expected that these lines will reduce the transport load on the Moscow Ring Road, Third Ring Road, departure lines, as well as the center of Moscow.

== Urban planning policy ==
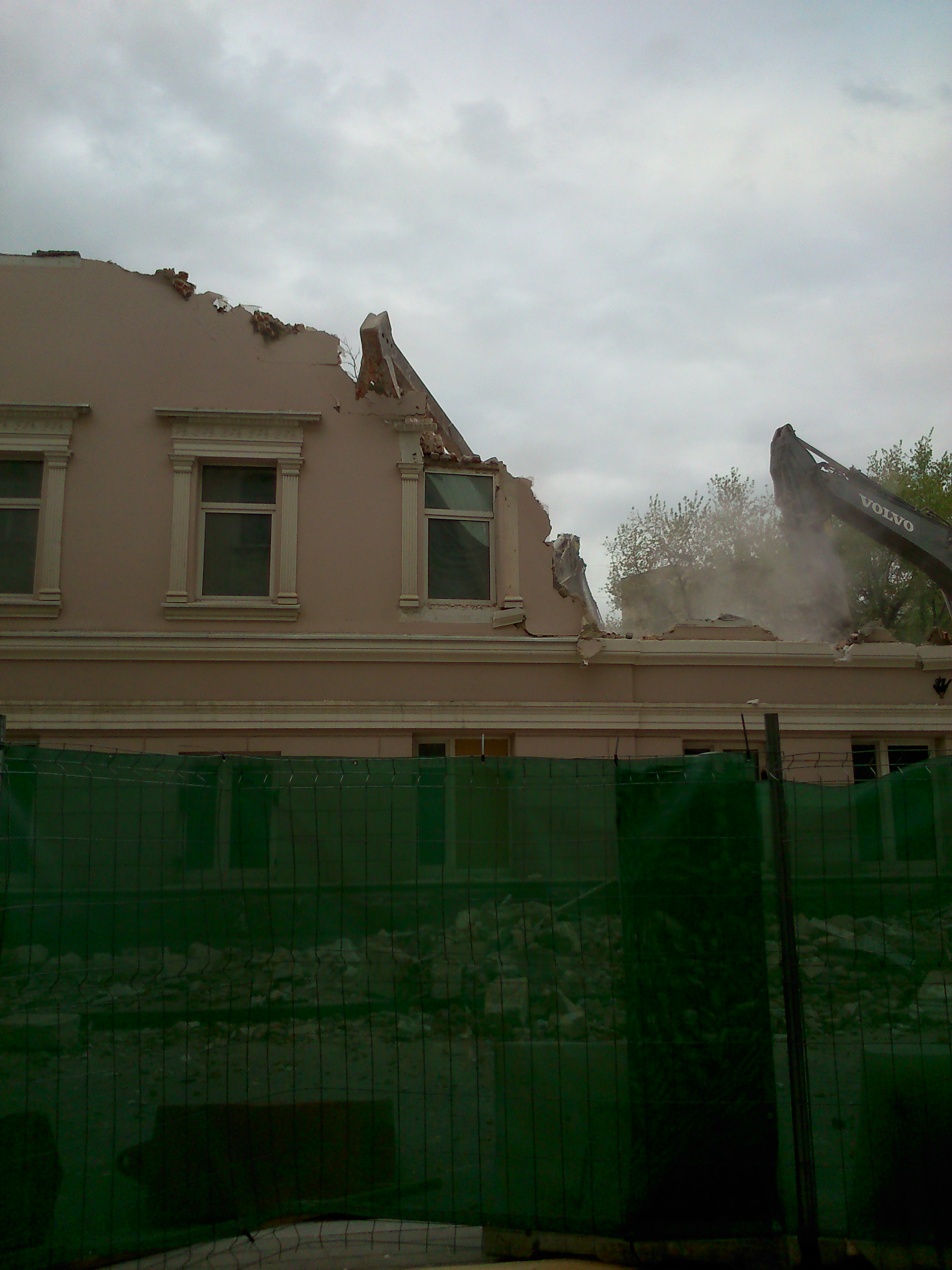
Demolition of the House of Neklyudova

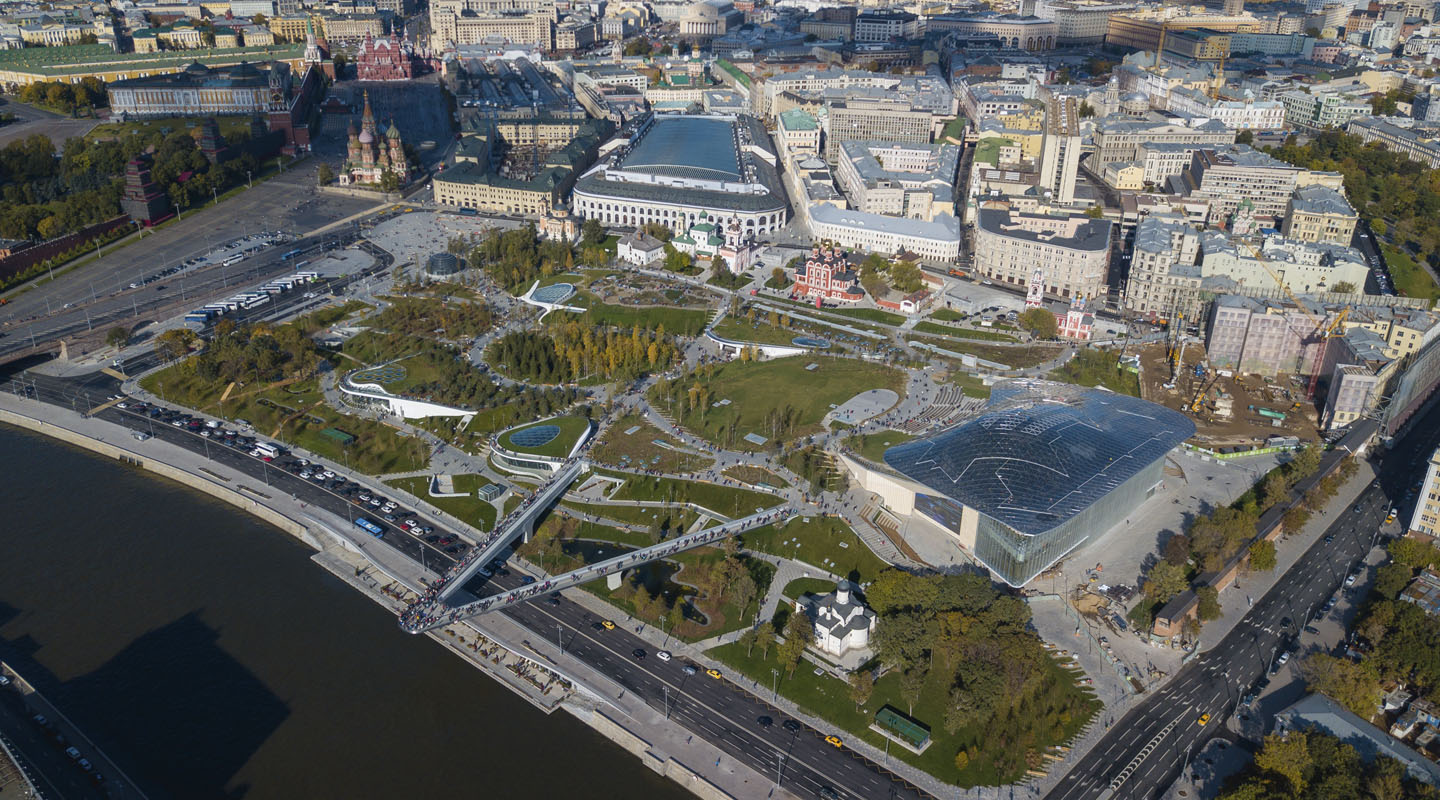
Zaryadye Park

After the election of Sobyanin as mayor in 2011 in Moscow, the city government developed and approved the program "Urban policy" in order to "create a favorable urban environment". Every year, a four-year targeted investment program and a 3-year program for the construction of off-budget facilities are formed.

The town-planning policy of the mayor's office of Sergei Sobyanin began with steps aimed at protecting the historical development of Moscow, but later he was repeatedly accused of lobbying the interests of the city's developers and construction companies. The reason for a broad public discussion and claims against the city hall was initiated in 2017, a large-scale renovation program, designed in the future decades to settle areas of dilapidated panel housing.

Sobyanin, telling in October 2015 about the work in the field of urban protection, said that "Moscow in recent years has become the undisputed leader in the restoration of monuments of architecture", calling the preservation of cultural heritage one of the priorities of the city hall. According to him, 600 objects have been restored, 4000 facades of historical buildings have been restored and 189 buildings have been preserved, which were previously planned to be demolished. In particular, the procedure for recognition of historical buildings as monuments of architecture and culture was simplified. At the same time, architectural experts note that the restoration of many buildings, in fact, the construction of a new one is coming to an end.

At the same time, Sobyanin continued the practice of destroying historical buildings for the sake of new construction, for which the previous Mayor Yury Luzhkov was heavily criticized. In 2013, the coordinator of the movement "Arhnadzor" Rustam Rakhmatullin noted that with the arrival of the Sobyanin team, the attitude to the preservation of monuments has changed only at the declarative level: "with Sobyanin, everything continues, but at a slower pace and in a somewhat paradoxical way, as the declarations have changed." Some decrease in the level of construction activity in the center of Moscow Rakhmatullin associated with the "long-term public demand" as well as the outflow of money due to the crisis. At the same time, he negatively noted the fact that public adviser Sobyanin was appointed the largest developer, owner of the construction Corporation "Barkli" Leonid Kazinets, known for offering to demolish the old city by 70% and placed on the city hall responsibility for the loss of, among other historical sites such as the Estate of Shakhovsky—Glebovs—Streshnevs, Volkonsky house, "Children's world" on Lubyanskaya square, the Cathedral mosque and buildings of the complex of the new Catherine hospital. The practice of demolition of valuable objects of the urban environment for new construction continued in the following years: in 2016, the constructivist Taganskaya Automatic Telephone Station was demolished, in May 2017 — the House of Neklyudova on Malaya Bronnaya street.

Since October 2010 on behalf of Sobyanin initiated the reduction in the number of street trading facilities. The Committee adopted the model projects the stalls, and the number of points was reduced from 14 thousand to 9.9 thousand. By the beginning of 2015 in Moscow worked about 7 thousand stalls, of which about 2 thousand — the newspaper and ticket. In the spring of 2015, the city has replaced the 205 private pavilions at the new owned by the city. City hall lease them to entrepreneurs, and by the middle of 2017 plans to replace the remaining state 4811 private stalls. In December 2015, the authorities of Moscow adopted a decision on the demolition of 104 trade stands at subway stations. The legal conflict allowed the city to recognize self-building objects on city communications on which property rights were registered earlier. The demolition of objects on the night of February 9, 2016 caused a wide public outcry. On the night of August 29, the "second stage" of demolition of 107 more objects started.

In 2011, in the framework of the program of improvement of the city was initiated by a large-scale project to replace sidewalks asphalt pavement on the tiles following the example and standard of the cities of the developed Western countries, the Far East countries and China. It was planned to allocate 4 billion rubles for these purposes and replace 1.1 million square meters of asphalt pavement only in 2011, but the scale of the work was more modest, and 2.5 billion rubles were spent for these purposes in 2011–2012. It was assumed that the tiles will make the sidewalks more aesthetic and durable, and the current repair — more economical. The initiative has caused criticism of the members of the budget and financial Commission of the Moscow City Duma and residents. In the objections of the deputies from the Communist party, it was stated that this is not a priority need, and the budget billions could be mastered more usefully. Both the quality of the tiles and the accuracy of the work on its laying were criticized: the organization Left Front picketed the City Hall, and the Prefecture of the Central Okrug refused to accept the work on the streets. In 2015, within the framework of the new program "My street", which involves the reconstruction of streets in accordance with modern standards, concrete tiles on the sidewalks began to be replaced with granite slabs.

In 2014, the exhibition complex VDNKh became the property of Moscow, from that moment began an active reconstruction of the object. In 2015, the opening of the largest skating rink in Europe, designed for 5 thousand people, and in March 2016 in the main exhibition hall the mayor opened the relief of Yevgeny Vuchetich "the Bearer of Peace, the Soviet People Glory!" In 2015, the landscaping around the Novodevichy Monastery and on the Frunzenskaya embankment was completed.

On 9 September 2017, on the City Day, on the site of the demolished in 2006 Rossiya Hotel, the landscape urban park Zaryadye was opened. It is located next to the Red Square on Moskvoretskaya embankment. The park was built from 2014 to 2017.

=== Criticism ===
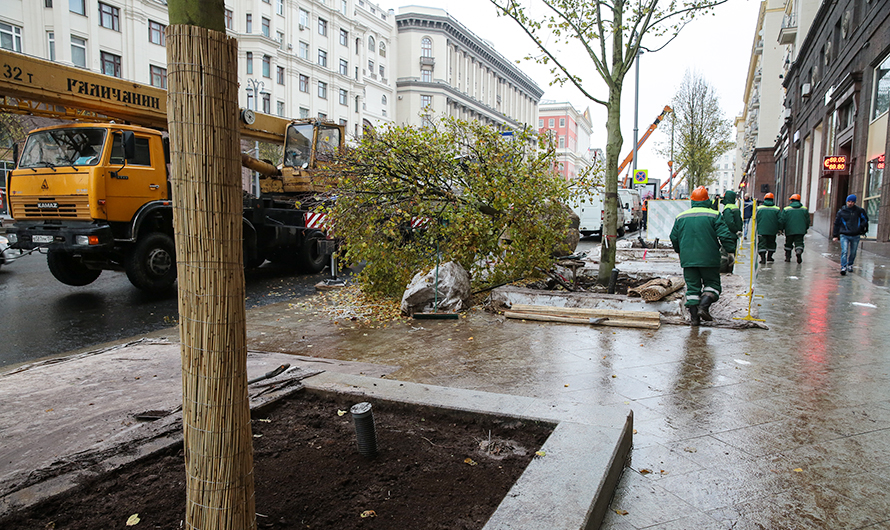
First landing of Tilias on Tverskaya Street in October 2016

Some projects, such as gardening of Tverskaya street for 300 million rubles, became the subject of criticism: co-founder of the Fund "City Projects" by Ilya Varlamov noted the weak elaboration of architectural solutions, and Alexei Navalny in Moscow election campaign in 2013, directly accused the mayor of inefficient spending and corruption schemes. In January 2017 Alexei Navalny in a publication about the purchase of jewelry for the streets of Moscow accused Sobyanin and the mayor of Moscow in the five-fold overstatement of expenditure in the purchase of Christmas decorations for city streets, the waste of funds. A few days after this, the mayor proposed to remove the data on public procurement of Moscow with the Federal portal of public procurement, which has been criticized by lawyers of the Anti-Corruption Foundation.

In December 2015, architectural critic Grigory Revzin said that when Sobyanin, Moscow has appeared "coherent urban development policy" with particular emphasis on the abolition of inherited from the previous municipality of investment contracts for 24 million square meters. The novelty of the policy that, except for urgent investments in the transport system and reconstruction of infrastructure, the city government under Sobyanin drew attention to public space. According to Revzin, at the symbolic level, "the car is repressed, the pedestrian has become the main thing", which in practice was embodied, in particular, in the rethought Gorky Park on Krymsky Val street, new embankments of the Moscow River, reconstructed streets in the city center, where the roadway was narrowed and granite sidewalks appeared.

At the same time, in February 2016 Grigory Revzin described the violent demolition of the retail pavilions in the metro in Moscow by the end of the "Sobyanin's urbanism" — urban policy since 2010, which combines the idea of modernization and the rejection of the shadow, in his opinion, the economy of the time of Yury Luzhkov: "To a certain extent this is reminiscent of the existence of cities in feudal Europe, "the air of Moscow was made free". The formula was as follows-instead of becoming European citizens, you are invited to become European citizens. "However, in 2016, the money for peaceful modernization from above", when everything was compensated, with all agreed", was not enough, which forced the Moscow authorities to go to the "scare action" in the form of night demolition of the pavilions.

== Policies pertaining to people ==
=== Immigration ===
In May 2013, Sergey Sobyanin in an interview with Moscow News said that there is a danger of the formation of mono-national neighborhoods in Moscow, which will turn into a "ghetto" and a source of social instability. The words that "people who speak Russian badly, who have a completely different culture, it is better to live in their country" have caused a wide public discussion.

In August 2015 Sobyanin ordered to tighten control over illegal migrants, which in Moscow may still be up to 2 million people (Federal Migration Service said about 1 million working foreigners in Moscow). The FMS of Russia estimates that 35% of the migration flow falls on Moscow and the Moscow Oblast. Previously, in order to legalize labor migrants in the suburban village of Sakharovo centre was opened for the granting of patents; the Moscow authorities had hoped that thanks to them the city budget will receive up to 12 billion of additional fees. Sobyanin advised the Federal Migration Service and the police to "actively clean" the city from illegal immigrants who have not received a patent for job.

=== Social policy ===
In 2013, the Government of Moscow initiated a reform of the city health care system, which resulted in the liquidation of 15 hospitals and several other medical institutions, as well as a massive reduction of doctors, nurses and other health care workers . The reform caused a wide public response, as well as criticism from President Vladimir Putin.

On 1 April 2015, a law was adopted that increases the minimum wage in Moscow to 16.5 thousand rubles.

At the same time, the increase in rental fees (paid parking, increase in property tax), according to experts, may indicate the desire of the Moscow authorities to launch the process of gentrification, which will force out of the city center low-margin business and low-income people.

== Environmental policy ==
In September 2014 Sobyanin closed the waste incineration plant "Ecologist" in the area of Nekrasovka. The next June he banned the construction of a waste incineration plant on the car repair street in the Northern Administrative Okrug.

With the support of the Moscow Government and with the participation of the Mayor, the Moscow Urban Forum has been held in the capital since 2011.

In August 2013, the campaign "Million trees" was launched, in which more than 40 thousand trees and 950 thousand shrubs were planted by November 2015. A total of 3.5 million trees and shrubs are planned to be planted by 2020. In 2016, in connection with the massive tree felling in Moscow, a number of activists and organizations repeatedly appealed to Sergei Sobyanin to stop the destruction of forest parks.

== Administrative policy ==
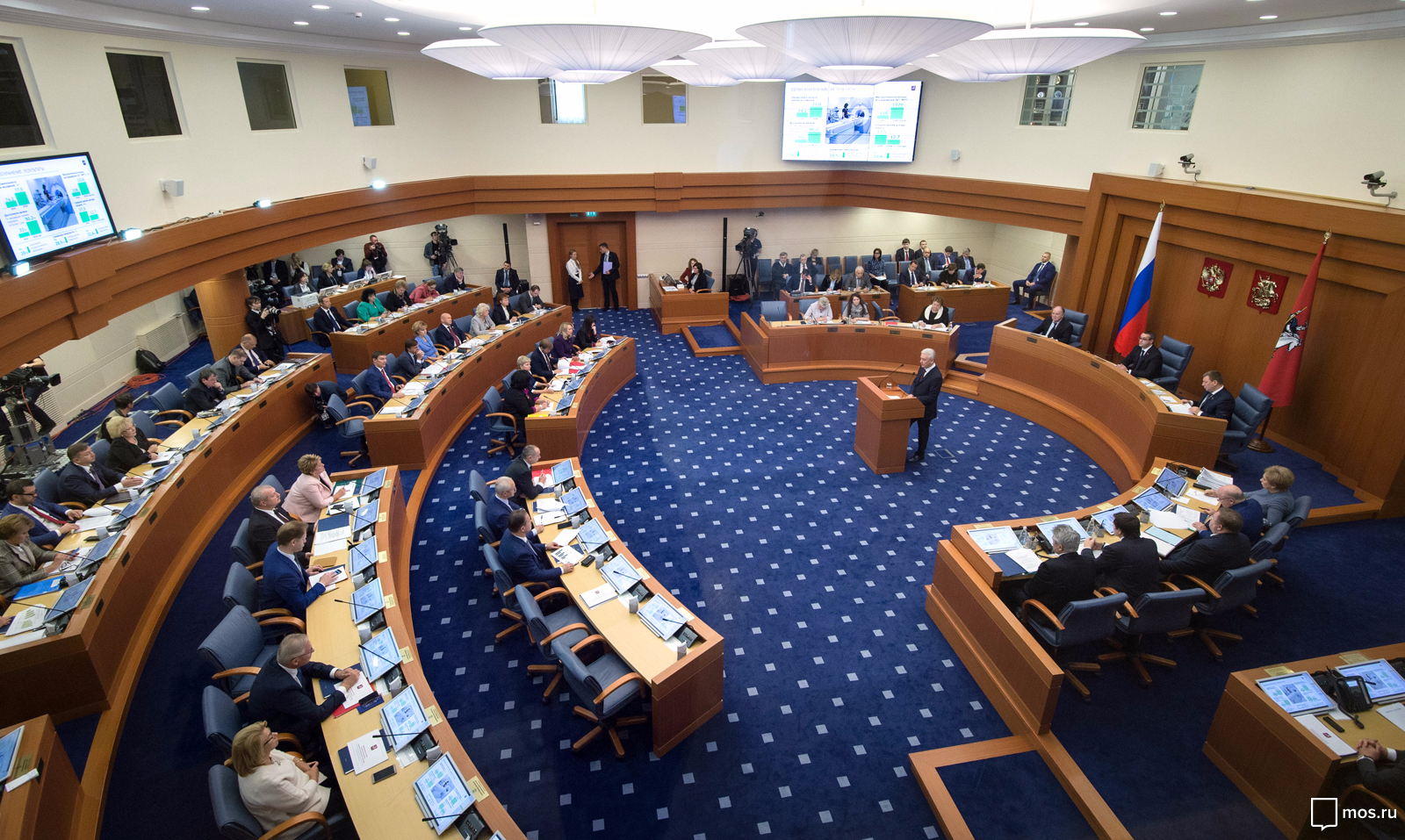
Sobyanin's 2016 Annual Report at the City Duma

The first discontent with Sobyanin as Mayor of Moscow was related to the election procedure, in which critics saw "appointment from above": the elections were held by secret voting of deputies of the Moscow city Duma for the candidates proposed by the President of Russia. In the future, due to the authoritarian approach to urban management, providing for a minimum dialogue with Muscovites, and the accelerated implementation of projects, many initiatives of the city hall were perceived by the latter with skepticism, despite the introduction of modern technologies and the involvement of authoritative urbanists as consultants. However, after the return of direct elections of the Mayor, in 2013 Sobyanin announced his resignation, with the aim of a snap direct election (initially the election was to be held in 2015).

With the arrival of the Mayor Sobyanin began to gradually change the management team. Five years later, of the eight Vice Mayors, only one — supervising housing Pyotr Biryukov — has remained since the time of mayor Yury Luzhkov. Notable personnel decisions Sobyanin became the involvement of Sergey Kapkov as head of the Department of Culture, Maxim Liksutov as head of the Department of Transport and Marat Khusnullin as head of the Department of Urban Development and Construction in Moscow.

The municipality gradually built a managerial hierarchy. At first, the range of issues for which 146 municipalities of the city are responsible was cut: they were given the right to coordinate plans for major repairs of houses, improvement of courtyards and parks, schemes for the placement of small commercial facilities and construction of local importance, but at the same time decisions are made at the level of prefectures on the main issues. In the future, the government began to cut the rights of prefectures in favor of the city administration.

In March 2015, Sobyanin announced a 30% reduction in the staff of Moscow civil servants (3 thousand people). At the same time, he cut his salary and payments to the members of the city government by his decree.

== 2020 coronavirus pandemic ==
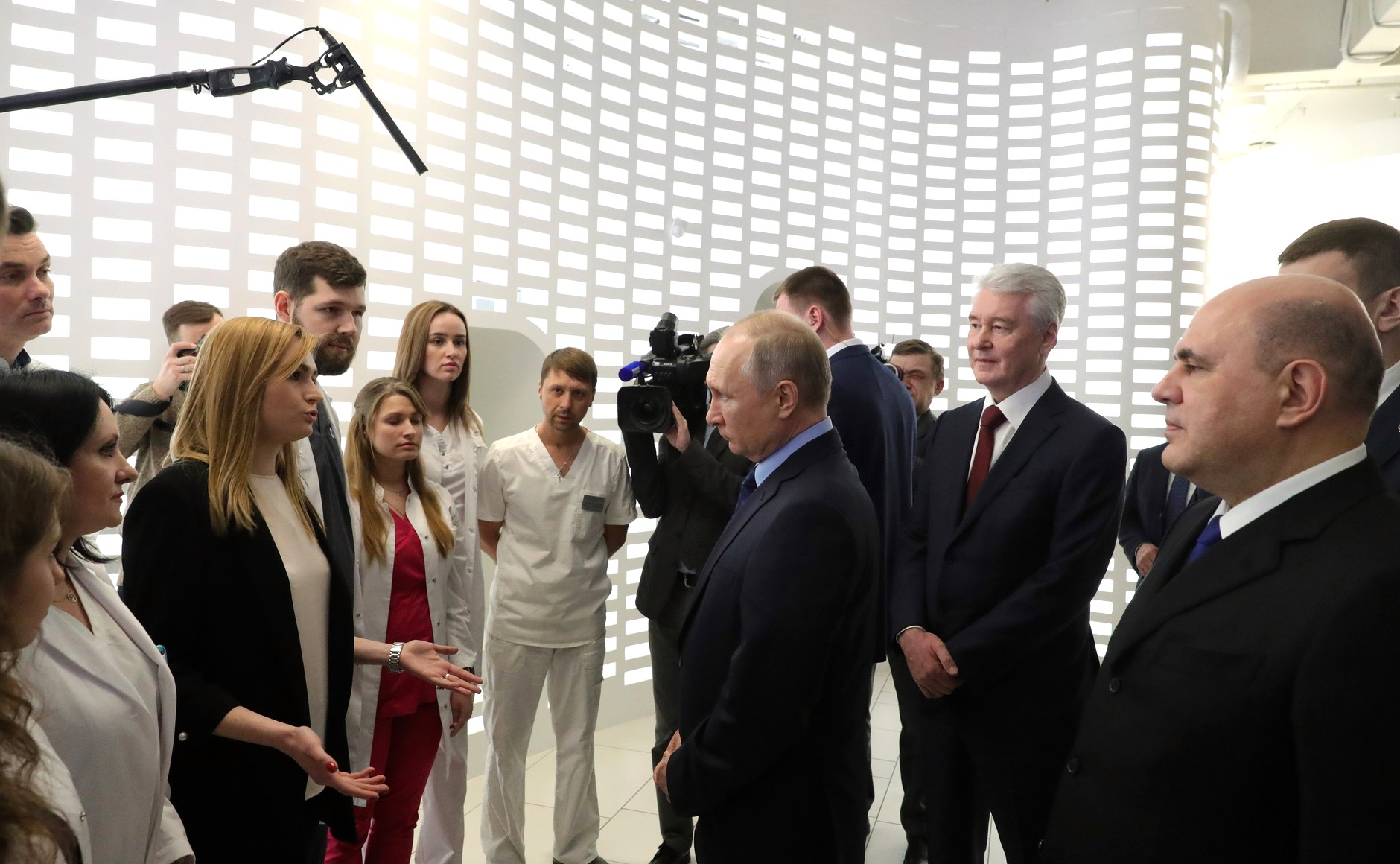
Mayor Sobyanin, President Putin and Prime Minister Mishustin visited the Coronavirus Monitoring Center on 17 March.

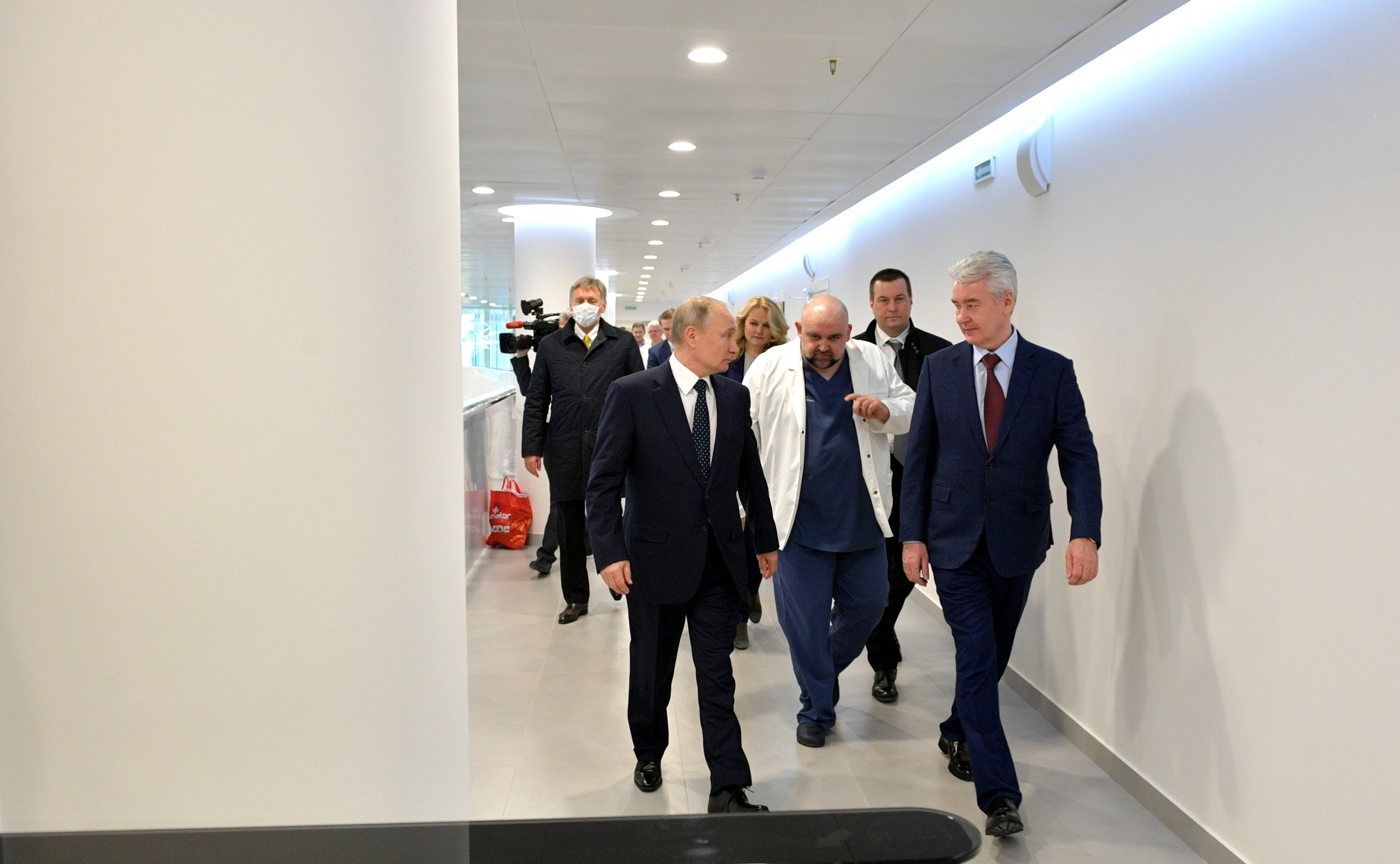
Denis Protsenko (middle), the medical director of the Kommunarka hospital visited by President Putin and Mayor Sobyanin, was tested positive for the coronavirus.

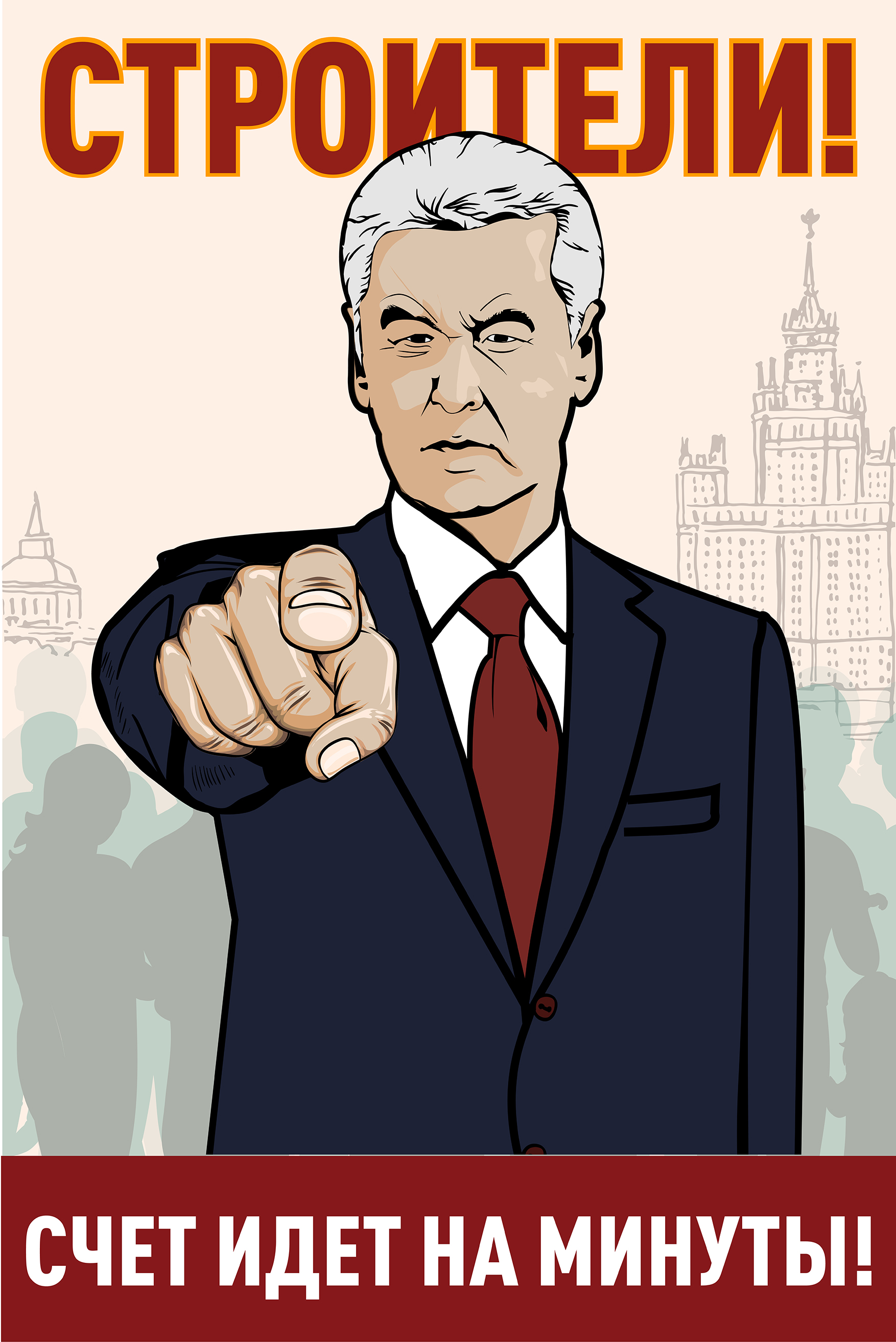
Sergey Sobyanin reminds builders that "every minute counts" on this poster on a construction site for a medical center in Moscow during the COVID-19 pandemic in March 2020.

On 6 March, Sergey Sobyanin announced a “high alert regime”, ordering self-isolation for two weeks for Russians returning from China, South Korea, Iran, France, Germany, Italy and Spain.

On 10 March, Mayor Sobyanin signed a decree for banning mass events in Moscow with more than 5,000 participants from 10 March to 10 April.

On 10 March was also identified a place for the construction of a new hospital for the coronavirus patients. Hospital The hospital is being built near the villages of Babenki and Golokhvastovo in Troitsky Administrative Okrug. Currently, many Moscow patients arrive to newly built site of the City Hospital No. 40 in the district of Kommunarka. The Mukhin and Yudin City Hospitals, City Hospital No. 52, Maxillofacial Hospital for War Veterans, Infectious Hospitals No. 1 and 2, Bashlyaeva Children's Hospital, City Hospital No. 67, and the Sklifosovsky Institute are also receiving patients suspected to have COVID-19.

On 15 March 2020, a Working Group of the State Council for the fight against coronavirus was formed by a decree of President Vladimir Putin. Sergey Sobyanin was appointed the group's head. The group's responsibilities are to coordinate regional efforts to counter the spread of the disease. The Working Group is lower in the hierarchy compared to the Coordination Council created a day earlier and headed by Prime Minister Mikhail Mishustin. At the same time, Sobyanin is the First Deputy of Mishustin in the Coordination Council.

On 16 March, Moscow extended measures to closing public schools, athletic schools and supplemental education institutions from 21 March to 12 April; banning indoor events with more than 50 attendees and all outdoor mass events. The compulsory 14-day self-isolation which had been previously enforced to people coming China, South Korea and Iran, was extended to those coming from the United States and all European countries.

On 23 March, Mayor Sobyanin ordered all people over 65 to self-isolate at home starting Thursday, saying each would receive 4,000 rubles for following the order. He also suggested that older residents leave Moscow and stay in their dachas. School students' public transportation cards were temporarily suspended, starting from the 5th grade.

On 24 March, it was announced that Moscow hospitals would receive up to 200,000 roubles (around $2,500) for each coronavirus patient from the city's health insurance fund. On the same day, Sobyanin together with President Putin visited the Kommunarka hospital for patients with coronavirus, where he spoke with the chief doctor Denis Protsenko, who tested positive for coronavirus a week later.

On 25 March, following the respective decision of the federal government, Mayor Sobyanin ordered the closure of all municipal libraries and clubs, as well as cinemas and night clubs, banned hookah smoking in cafes, and suspended any organized leisure social activities, including amusement parks. He also instructed dental clinics to see patients with acute pain or other emergencies only. Municipal multiservice centers suspended services, except for those unavailable online. Free or concessionary use of public transport was suspended for people aged over 65, with chronic diseases, students of vocational schools or high schools.

On 26 March, Mayor Sobyanin ordered restaurants, cafes, bars, canteens, parks, commercial and retail businesses requiring personal attendance, except those providing essential services, like grocery shops and pharmacies, to closefrom 28 March to 5 April, the holiday week announced by President Putin.

On 29 March, Mayor Sobyanin announced the lockdown for all residents of Moscow, regardless of age, since 30 March. Muscovites will not be allowed to leave their homes except in cases of emergency medical care and other threats to life and health, to travel to work for those who are obliged to, to make purchases in the nearest store or pharmacy, to walk pets at a distance not exceeding 100 metres from the place of residence, as well as to take out the garbage. People have to keep a distance of 1.5 metres. Also, Sobyanin announced that Muscovites who become unemployed due to coronavirus will get 19,500 rubles (around $250) a month. Senator Andrey Klishas, chair of the Federation Council Committee on constitutional legislation and state construction, criticized this decision, saying that such restrictions are the exclusive competence of the Federal Assembly and the President.

=== Accusations of ethnic profiling at the earlier stages ===
In February, it was reported that drivers of city's public transport were required to inform their dispatchers if they see Chinese nationals in their vehicles, for police to be called. Moscow Metro employees were required to ask Chinese nationals to fill in questionnaires.

On 21 February, Sergey Sobyanin confirmed that Mosgortrans and Moscow Metro were asked to work together with police forces to "monitor those who arrived from China". Facial recognition was also used to track these people.

On 24 February, the Chinese Embassy in Russia asked Moscow authorities to put an end to these "excessive measures" in transport. Sobyanin insisted that the measures were not discriminatory but helped control those who were required to stay self-isolated upon arrival from China.

However at the later stages many of these Russian measures were applied to all foreign arrivals, including for Russian citizens coming back from abroad, with them being forced into self quarantine and facecam profiling. 200 cases of quarantine-breakers by Russian citizens were reported to be recognized with facecam profiling, tracked by Public surveillance cameras in Moscow.

== Other ==
In 2012, according to the decision taken by President Dmitry Medvedev, there was a sharp expansion of the territory of Moscow due to the accession of the South-West of the Moscow region. Since July 1, 2012, the area of Moscow has increased 2.4 times, and the population has increased by 250 thousand people.
