= 1999 Moscow mayoral election =

- 19 December 1999
- Turnout: 66.13%
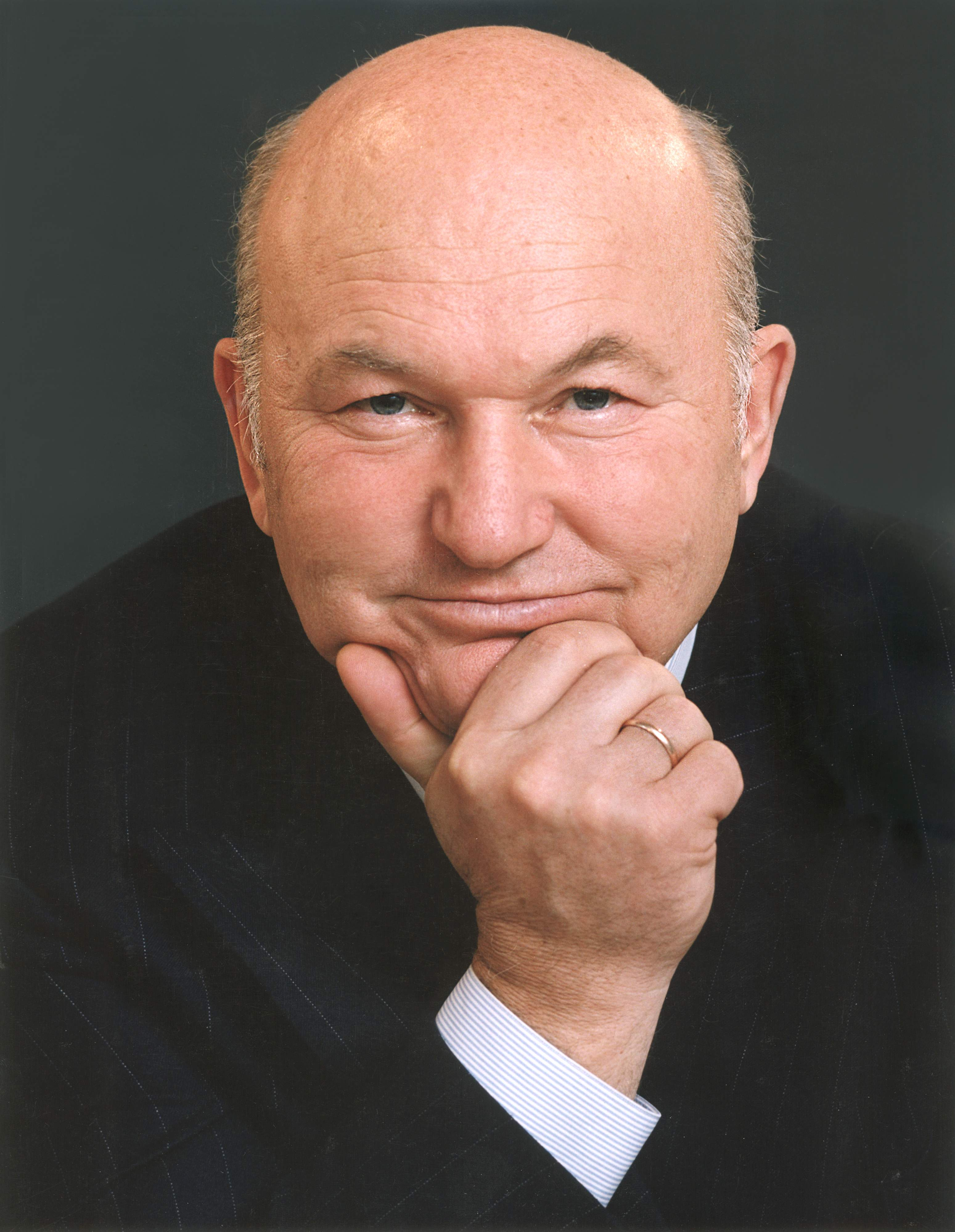

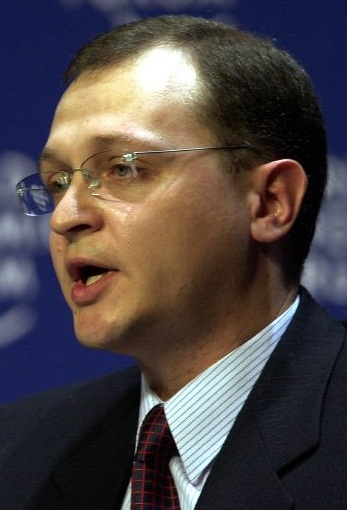

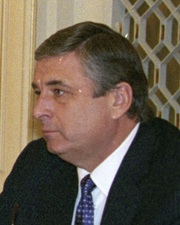
Candidate	Yury Luzhkov	Sergey Kiriyenko	Pavel Borodin
Party	Independent	Independent	Independent
Alliance	OVR	SPS
Running mate	Valery Shantsev	Vyacheslav Glazychev	Leonid Troshin
Popular vote	3,174,658	510,958	273,076
Percentage	69.89%	11.25%	6.01%
Mayor before election
Yury Luzhkov
Fatherland
Elected Mayor
Yury Luzhkov
Fatherland

The 1999 Moscow mayoral election was an election that took place on December 19, 1999, in the city of Moscow to the Mayor of Moscow. According to the results, the tandem of incumbent mayor Yuri Luzhkov and Valery Shantsev (for the post of vice-mayor) won in the first round with 69.9% of the votes.

== Background ==
In June 1999, the Moscow City Duma shortened the term of office of the mayor and vice-mayor of Moscow, elected on June 16, 1996 for a four-year term, to June 16, 2000. According to the legislation in force at that time, the date of the elections of the mayor and vice-mayor of Moscow had to be announced no later than 90 days before the election date (September 19, 1999) and agreed upon with the incumbent mayor. The incumbent mayor, Yuri Luzhkov, confirmed in writing his consent to scheduling the elections for December 19.

On July 7, 1999, the Moscow City Duma adopted Law of the City of Moscow No. 22 "On the Election of Deputies of the Moscow City Duma, the Mayor and Vice-Mayor of Moscow and Councilors of the District Assembly in Moscow", which established the legislative basis for the upcoming elections.

== Campaign ==
On September 17, 1999, the current mayor of Moscow, Yuri Luzhkov, officially announced his intention to run for mayor, naming Valery Shantsev as his candidate for the post of vice-mayor. The opposition forces to Luzhkov in the Kremlin and the right forces, represented by the Union of Right Forces, nominated an alternative candidate to Luzhkov in the person of former Russian Prime Minister Sergei Kiriyenko.

On November 19, the final list of mayoral candidates was approved, which included pensioner Vladimir Voronin, human rights activist from Kazan Dmitry Berdnikov, former Prime Minister of Russia Sergei Kiriyenko, incumbent Mayor of Moscow Yuri Luzhkov, Chief of Staff of the President of Russia Pavel Borodin, State Duma deputy from the LDPR Aleksey Mitrofanov, State Duma deputy Vladimir Semago, businessman Yevgeny Martynov, Deputy Chairman of the Moscow Healthcare Committee Ivan Leshkevich, Chairman of Pamyat movement, Dmitri Vasilyev and director of a trading company Vladimir Kiselyov.

During the election campaign, Vladimir Semago and Ivan Leshkevich withdrew their candidacies, giving their support to Luzhkov. Dmitry Berdnikov was removed from registration because of the partner of the vice-mayoral candidate.

The first round of elections took place on December 19, 1999. Voter turnout was 66%.

== Results ==
Results of the 1999 Moscow mayoral election
Candidate	Running mate	Party	Result	%
Yury Luzhkov	Valery Shantsev	Fatherland – All Russia	3,174,658	69.89
Sergey Kiriyenko	Vyacheslav Glazychev	Union of Right Forces	510,958	11.25
Pavel Borodin	Leonid Troshin	Independent	273,026	6.01
Yevgeny Martynov	Sergey Seryogin	CPRF	128,404	2.83
Dmitry Vasilyev	Alexander Netesov	Pamyat	47,067	1.04
Aleksey Mitrofanov	Andrey Brezhnev	Independent	27,528	0.61
Vladimir Voronin	Svetlana Savinova	Independent	18,564	0.41
Vladimir Kiselyov	Valery Kireyev	Independent	8,944	0.19
Against all			254,013	5.59
Invalid ballots			98,974	2.18
Total			4,542,136	100
Eligible voters/turnout			6,936,912	65.48
