= Mayor of Moscow =

Highest-ranking official in Moscow, Russia

- Coat of arms of Moscow

- Flag of the City of Moscow

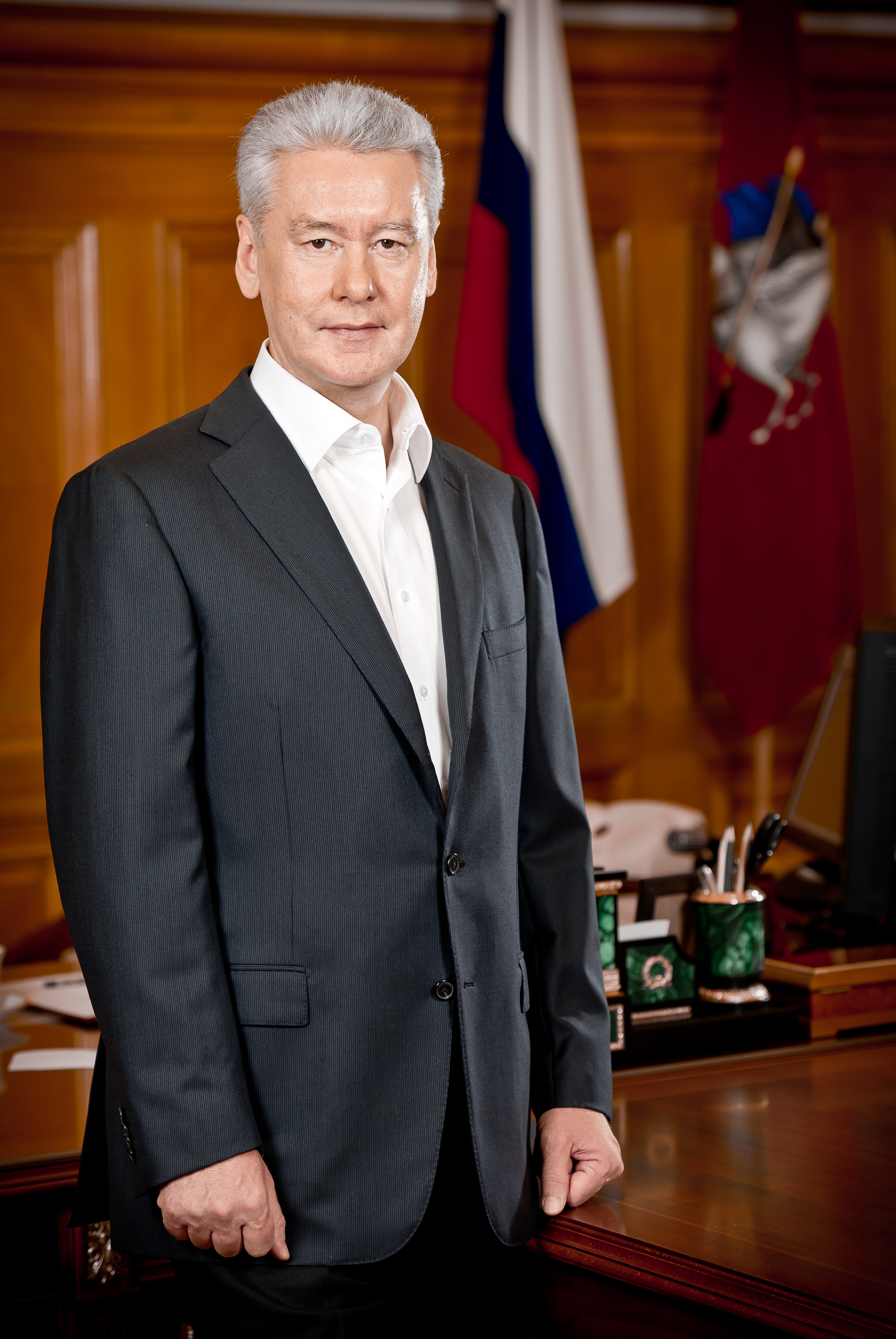
- Incumbent; Sergei Sobyanin since 21 October 2010
- Style: His Excellency; Mr. Mayor
- Seat: Moscow City Hall Building
- Appointer: Popular vote
- Term length: 5 years
- Inaugural holder: Gavriil Popov
- Formation: 12 June 1991
- Website: Office of the Mayor

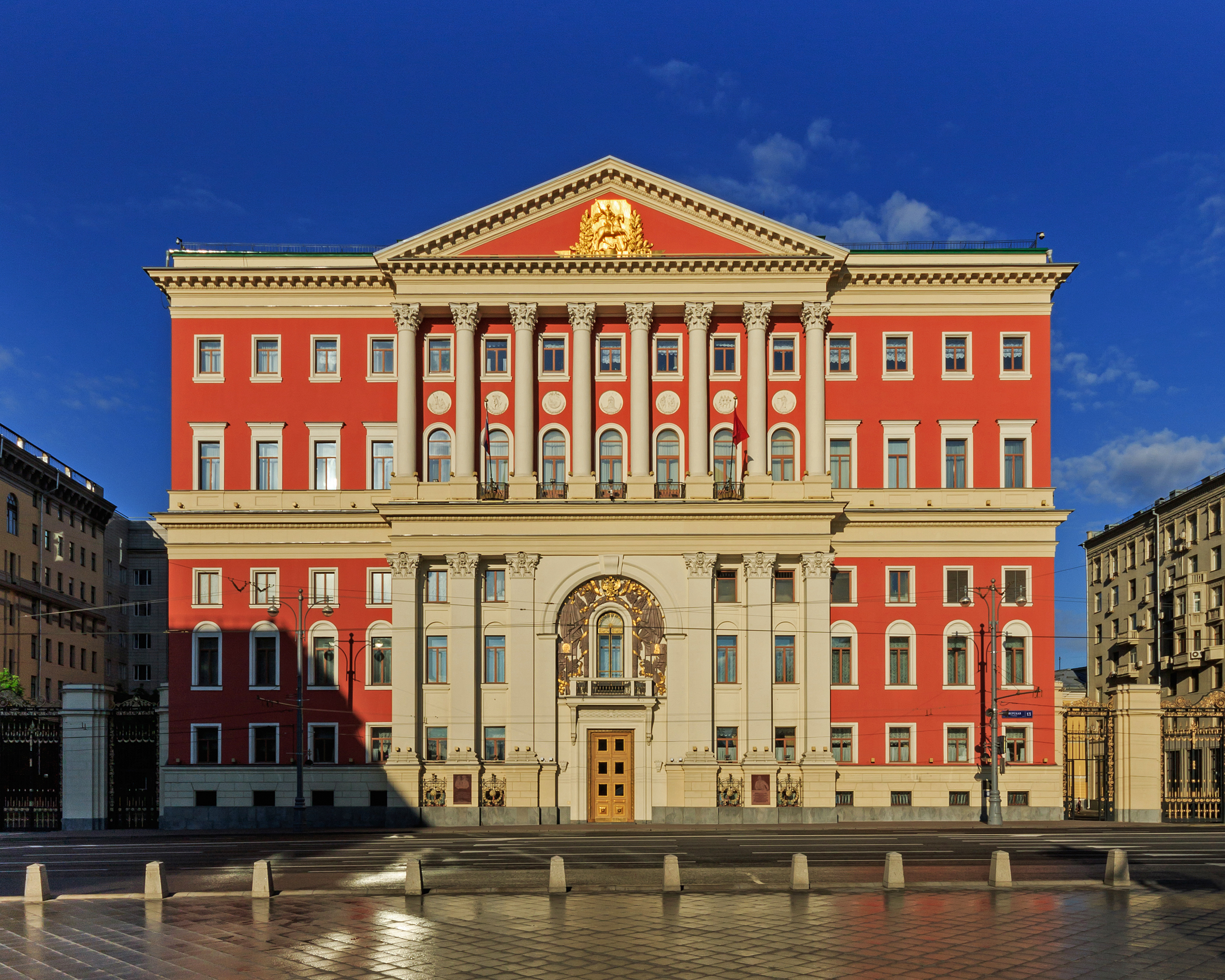
Moscow City Hall Building, the residence of the Mayor of Moscow (13 Tverskaya Street). Former Moscow Governor General House and Mossoviet building.

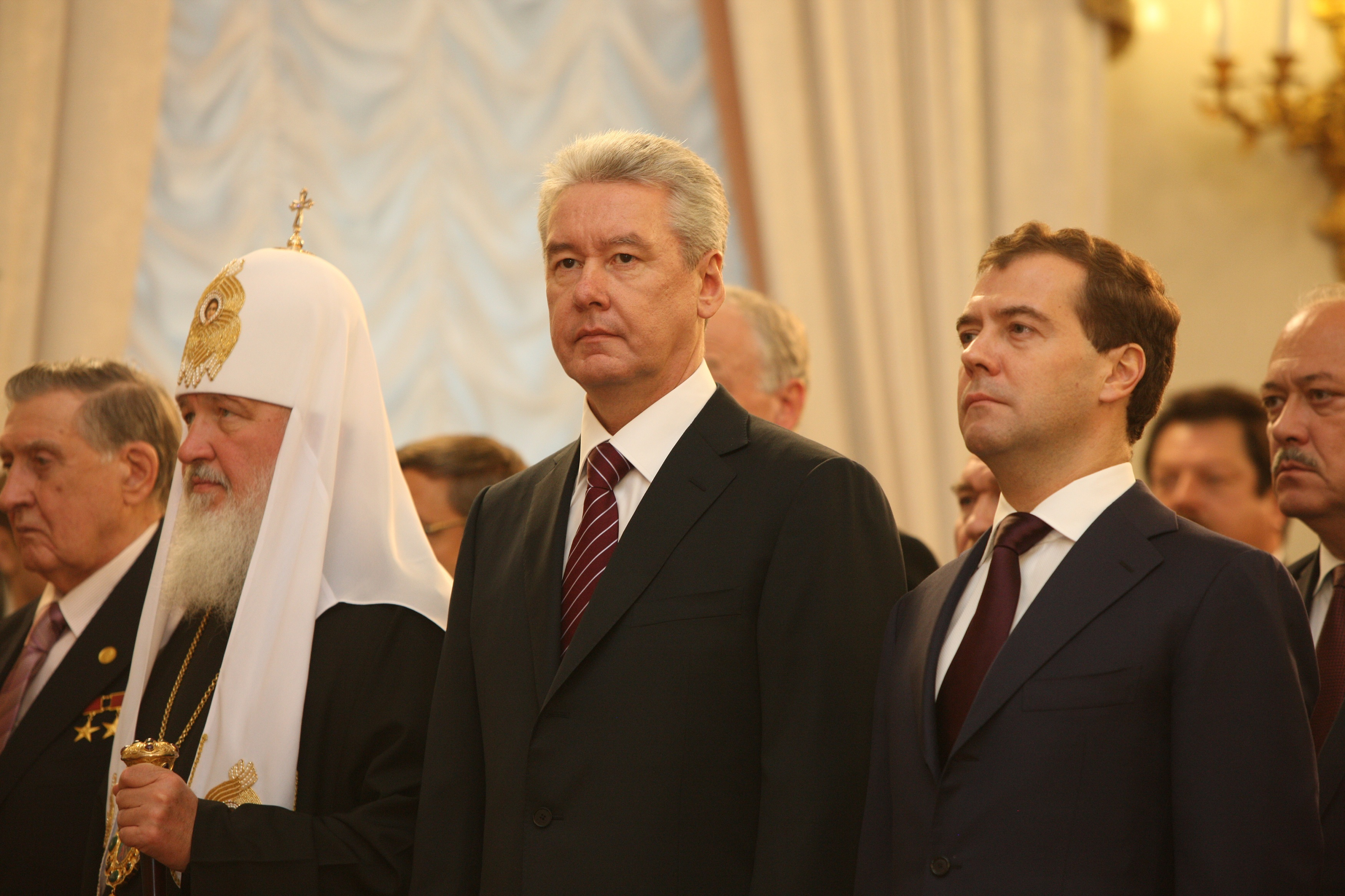
Sobyanin with Russian president Dmitry Medvedev and Patriarch Kirill of Moscow in his inaugural ceremony, at the Moscow City Hall Building. October 2010

The Mayor of Moscow (Russian: Мэр Москвы, romanized: Mer Moskvy) is the head and the highest-ranking official of Moscow, who leads the Government of Moscow, the main executive body of the city.

Moscow is both a city and separate federal subject, according to the Constitution of Russia. Most federal subjects are headed by governors, but the office of the head of Moscow is called Mayor of the City of Moscow, according to the Charter of the city of Moscow.

Sergei Sobyanin, the incumbent Mayor of Moscow, was re-elected for a new term in 2018 and then in 2023.

== Responsibilities ==
The separate office of the Premier of the Government of Moscow existed in 1991-2001 (Yury Luzhkov was the only officeholder), but it was merged with the office of Mayor of Moscow. 1999 Moscow mayoral election was the last time when the mayor ran together with the vice-mayor.

Mayor of Moscow heads Government of Moscow. The mayor's office administers all city services, public property, police and fire protection, most public agencies, and enforces all city and state laws within Moscow. The mayor's office is located in Moscow City Hall Building in Tverskaya Street and has jurisdiction over all districts of the City of Moscow. The mayor appoints deputy mayors, directors (heads of city departments) and other officials.

The Government of Moscow's budget is the largest regional budget in Russia.

== Elections ==
The position of Mayor of Moscow was elected between 1991 and 2004. In 2004, Vladimir Putin proposed a law to abolish the direct election of governors, the mayor of Moscow, and the presidents of Russian regions. The law was swiftly passed by the parliament. The new legislation changed the election system to an indirect one, in which parliamentary political parties and the President of Russia nominated a candidate who must then have been approved by the Moscow City Duma. Following the 2011–13 Russian protests that followed the 2011 parliamentary election, President Dmitry Medvedev offered to re-introduce the direct elections of the governors and the mayor of Moscow, and legislation to this effect was passed by the Parliament. In the 2013 mayoral election, for the first time in 10 years, the mayor was elected by popular vote.

A candidate to the office must be a citizen of the Russian Federation over the age of 30. Candidates can be nominated both by political parties and as self-nomination. In any case, candidates must pass the "municipal filter" (collection of signatures of municipal deputies).

=== Latest election ===
Sergei Sobyanin was re-elected for a new term in 2023.

== Mayors of Moscow (1991–present) ==
No.	Mayor	Took office	Left office	Time in office	Party	Vice Mayor	Election
1	Gavriil Popov	12 June 1991	6 June 1992	360 days	Democratic Russia	Yury Luzhkov	1991
2	Yury Luzhkov	6 June 1992	28 September 2010	18 years, 114 days	Independent → Fatherland → United Russia	vacancy	– (Note: Succeeded as vice mayor)
2	Yury Luzhkov	6 June 1992	28 September 2010	18 years, 114 days	Independent → Fatherland → United Russia	Valery Shantsev (1996–2005)	1996; 1999; 2003; 2007 (Note: Appointed by the President of Russia with the consent of the Moscow City Duma.)
2	Yury Luzhkov	6 June 1992	28 September 2010	18 years, 114 days	Independent → Fatherland → United Russia	position abolished (Note: Vice mayor ceased to be an elected office in 2003 and was abolished in 2005 after Valery Shantsev resigned.)	1996; 1999; 2003; 2007
—	Vladimir Resin	28 September 2010	21 October 2010	23 days	United Russia	position abolished	Acting
3	Sergei Sobyanin	21 October 2010	5 June 2013	15 years, 358 days	United Russia	position abolished	2010
—	Sergei Sobyanin	5 June 2013	12 September 2013	15 years, 358 days	United Russia	position abolished	Acting
(3)	Sergei Sobyanin	12 September 2013	Incumbent	15 years, 358 days	United Russia	position abolished	2013; 2018; 2023

== Previous heads of Moscow government ==
=== Chairmen of the Executive Committee (1917–1991) ===
No.	Portrait	Name	Took office	Left office	Time in office	Political party
1		Viktor Nogin	September 1917	November 1917	61 days	Communist Party
2		Mikhail Pokrovsky	November 1917	March 1918	120 days	Communist Party
3		Pyotr Smidovich	March 1918	October 1918	214 days	Communist Party
4		Lev Kamenev	October 1918	16 January 1926	7 years, 107 days	Communist Party
5		Konstantin Ukhanov	16 January 1926	1931	4 years, 350 days	Communist Party
6		Nikolai Bulganin	1931	22 July 1937	6 years, 202 days	Communist Party
7		Ivan Sidorov	22 July 1937	3 November 1938	1 year, 104 days	Communist Party
8		Alexander Yefremov	3 November 1938	14 April 1939	162 days	Communist Party
9		Vasily Pronin	14 April 1939	7 December 1944	5 years, 237 days	Communist Party
10		Georgy Popov	7 December 1944	18 January 1950	5 years, 42 days	Communist Party
11		Mikhail Yasnov	18 January 1950	2 February 1956	6 years, 15 days	Communist Party
12		Nikolai Bobrovnikov	2 February 1956	2 September 1961	5 years, 212 days	Communist Party
13		Nikolai Dygai	2 September 1961	6 March 1963	1 year, 185 days	Communist Party
14		Vladimir Promyslov	11 March 1963	December 1985	22 years, 265 days	Communist Party
15		Valery Saykin	3 January 1986	14 April 1990	4 years, 11 days	Communist Party
16		Yury Luzhkov	26 April 1990	2 July 1991	1 year, 67 days	Communist Party

== Latest election ==
Summary of the 10 September 2023 Moscow mayoral election results
Candidate	Party	Votes	%
Sergey Sobyanin	United Russia	2,491,327	76.85
Leonid Zyuganov	Communist Party	264,644	8.16
Boris Chernyshov	Liberal Democratic Party	183,132	5.65
Vladislav Davankov	New People	174,286	5.38
Dmitry Gusev	A Just Russia	128,306	3.96
Total		3,241,695	100.00
Valid votes		3,241,695	99.40
Invalid/blank votes		19,718	0.60
Registered voters/turnout		7,604,055	42.89
Official results published by the Moscow City Electoral Commission

== See also ==
- Governor of Saint Petersburg
- Governor of Sevastopol (Russia)
- Government of Moscow
- Moscow City Police
