= 2003 Moscow mayoral election =

- 7 December 2003
- Turnout: 57.54%

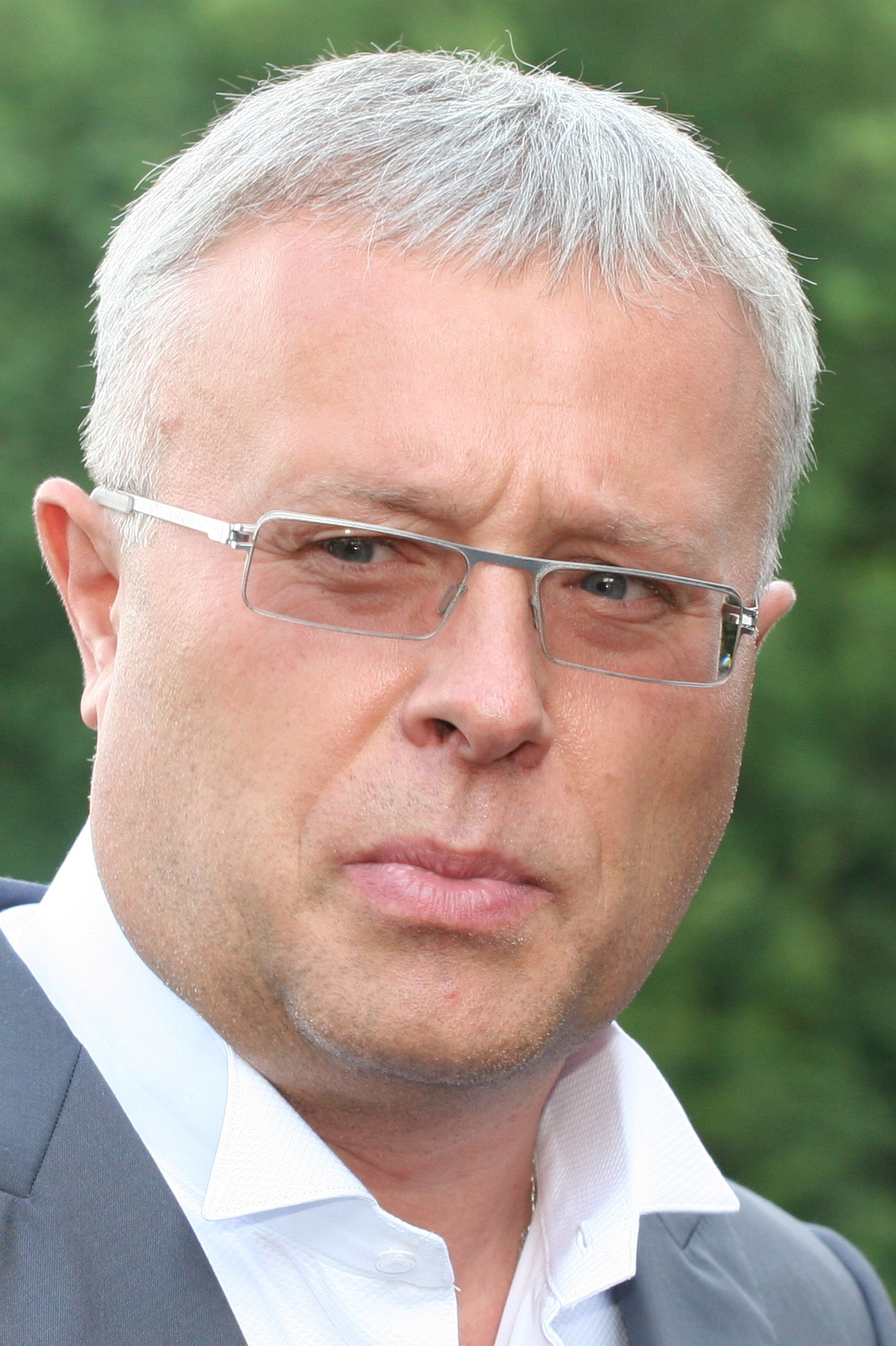
Candidate	Yury Luzhkov	Alexander Lebedev
Party	Independent	Independent
Alliance	United Russia	Rodina
Popular vote	3,018,500	499,318
Percentage	74.83%	12.38%
- Results by districts
Mayor before election
Yury Luzhkov
United Russia
Elected Mayor
Yury Luzhkov
United Russia

The 2003 Moscow mayoral election took place on 7 December 2003, simultaneously with elections to the State Duma.

== Candidates ==
- Yury Luzhkov – Mayor of Moscow. Participated in the elections as the independent candidate. Simultaneously, participated in the elections to the State Duma on the party list of United Russia.
- Alexander Lebedev – The President of "National Reserve Bank". Participated in the elections as the independent candidate. Simultaneously, participated in the elections to the State Duma on the party list of Rodina.
- German Sterligov – Multimillionaire. Participated in the elections as the independent candidate.
- Nikolay Lifanov – General Director of "Progress Association". Participated in the elections as the independent candidate.

=== Withdrew ===
- Alexander Krasnov – Head of the Presnensky District of Moscow.
- Aleksey Mitrofanov – Member of the State Duma. Was nominated by the Liberal Democratic Party. But withdrew his candidacy in connection with the fact that he decided to run only in the State Duma.
- Igor Smykov – Lawyer and human rights activist. Independent candidate. Withdrew his candidacy in favor of Yury Luzhkov.

== Result ==
Candidate	Party	Votes	%
Yury Luzhkov	United Russia (Note: Participated as self-nominated independent)	3,018,500	75.45
Alexander Lebedev	National Patriotic Union "Rodina"	499,318	12.48
German Sterligov	Independent, endorsed by DPNI	147,320	3.68
Nikolay Lifanov	Independent	46,222	1.16
Against all		289,314	7.23
Total		4,000,674	100.00
Valid votes		4,000,674	99.18
Invalid/blank votes		32,963	0.82
Total votes		4,033,637	100.00
Registered voters/turnout		7,029,932	57.38
Source: CEC of Moscow (archived)
