= Moscow City Hall Building =

- Здание мэрии Москвы
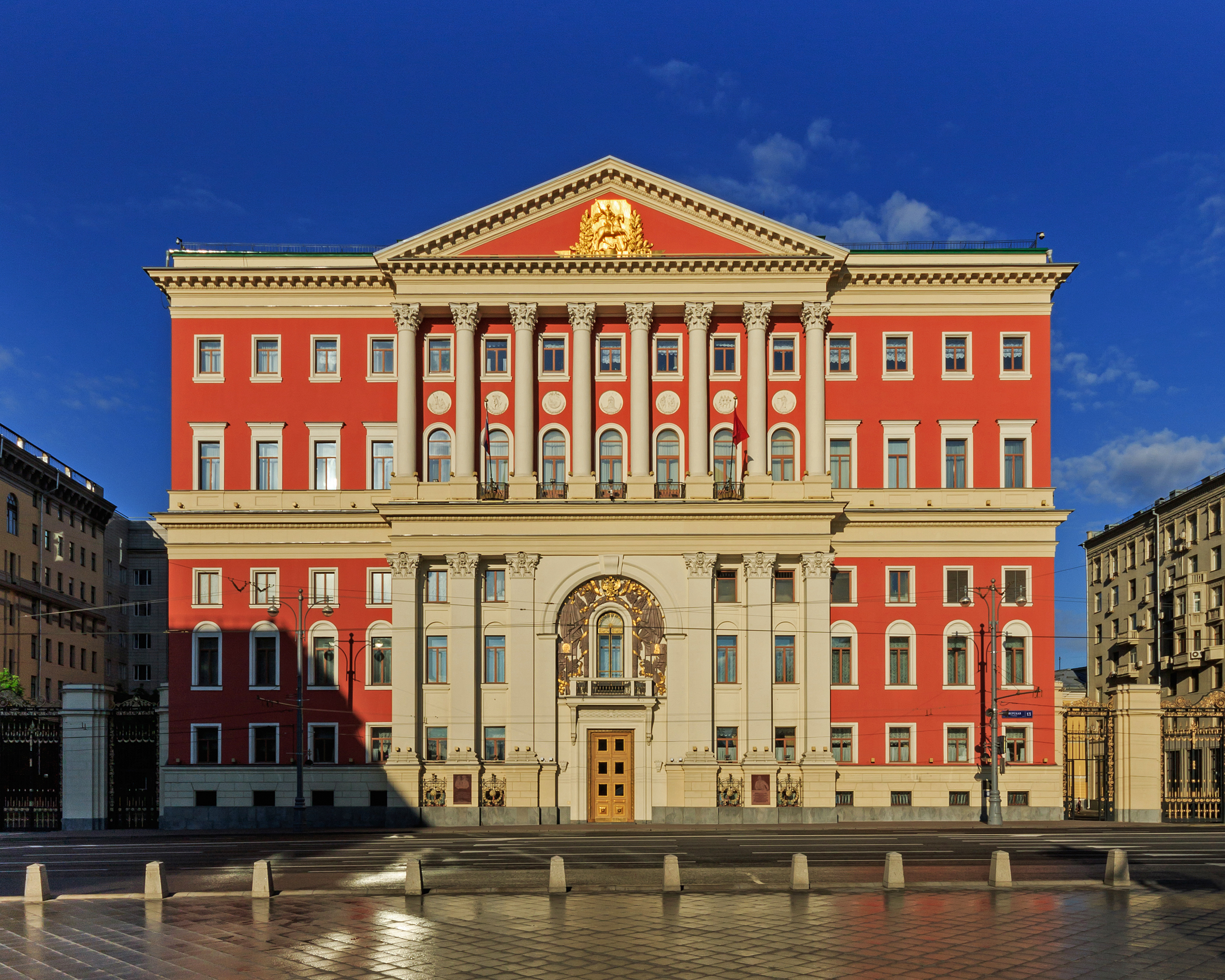
- The building in 2015

- Location within Moscow
- Former names: Golitsyn House, Chernyshev Estate

General information
- Type: City hall
- Architectural style: Classicism
- Location: 13 Tverskaya Street, Moscow, Russia
- Coordinates: 55°45′40″N 37°36′31″E
- Current tenants: Mayor of Moscow
- Completed: 1782; 244 years ago
- Client: Zakhar Chernyshev
- Owner: Government of Moscow

Design and construction
- Architect: Matvey Kazakov

Moscow City Hall Building (Russian: Здание мэрии Москвы) (also known as Golitsin House (Russian: дом Голицина) and Chernyshev Estate (Russian: Усадьба Чернышёва)) is a building located in Moscow at 13 Tverskaya Street. It was built in 1782 according to the design of the architect Matvey Kazakov and until 1917 served as the residence of Moscow governors general. After the October Revolution, the house was occupied by the Moscow City Council, the city legislature during the Soviet period. Since 1993, the building has been under the control of the Mayor of Moscow and the Government of Moscow.

== History ==
=== Governor General's House ===
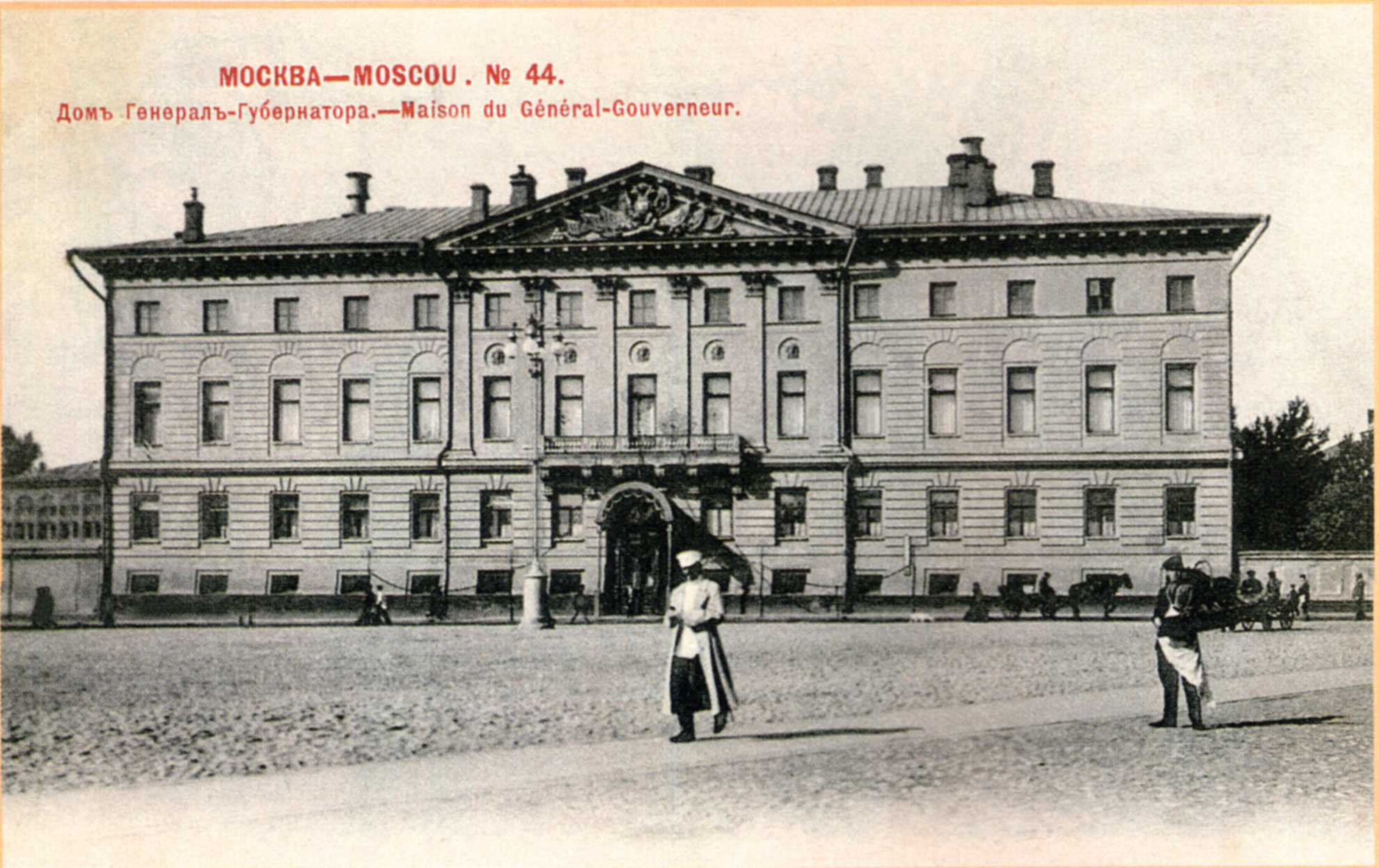
Residence of Moscow Governor General, 1902

In the second half of the 18th century, a section of Tverskaya Street near Voznesensky Lane was severely damaged by the Trinity Fire. In 1778-1782 a new building was erected on this site. Most historians attribute the authorship of the project to Matvey Kazakov, but some researchers believe that he only carried out engineering work according to the plan of an unknown architect. The estate served as the personal residence of Count Zakhar Chernyshev, who by the time the work was completed took the post of Governor General of Moscow.

The three-story palace in the style of mature classicism was facing Tverskaya Square. It had an enfilade layout: after climbing the main staircase, decorated with copper balusters, visitors found themselves in the White Hall. Its walls were decorated with marble and figured bas-reliefs, the floor was covered with stacked parquet with dark oak inlay. Under the ceiling there were special choirs for musicians, which were supported by paired columns from below. Through the marble Blue Hall, guests entered the Red Hall, which differed sharply from the strict design of the previous rooms. The room was decorated in white, gold and scarlet shades, and was also decorated with many mirrors, stucco moldings and colored decorations. On the back side of the estate there were side buildings that created a courtyard. During the construction of the foundation, materials from the dismantled walls of the White City were used.

In 1785, after Chernyshev's death, the estate was purchased at the expense of the treasury from his heirs. In the 1790s, the estate was reconstructed according to the design of Matvey Kazakov. By that time, it received the name "Tver State House, occupied by the Governor General" and was one of the largest administrative buildings outside the Kremlin walls. To heat the premises, the building contained 182 Dutch, 52 Russian and 17 ovens, as well as four fireplaces and 12 hearths. It is known that in the future the residence was repeatedly rebuilt in accordance with the requirements and tastes of the incumbent mayor. By the end of the 18th century, a military parade ground was built in front of the mansion, and in 1806 a house church was built on the premises, which existed until 1921.

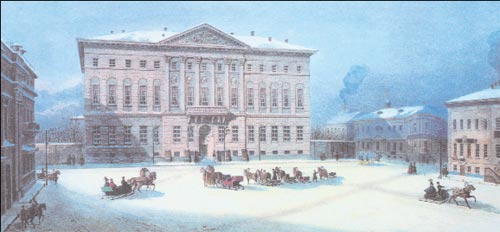
Lithograph by A. Kadol “House of the Governor General on Tverskaya Street,” early 19th century

The mayor's residence survived the Moscow fires of 1812, but was heavily damaged by vandalism by French Imperial Army. The soldiers used wooden doors and parquet to light stoves and fireplaces. The restoration of the palace began only in 1814 under Governor General Alexander Tormasov under the leadership of the architect V. Miroshevsky. A year later, a reception was given within the walls of the house in honor of the birthday of Emperor Alexander I of Russia. Some researchers believe that it was during this period that Kazakov's orderless architectural composition was supplemented with Corinthian pilasters. In 1823, the building was damaged by fire, the restoration of which took more than two years. Later, in 1839, some of the courtyard wings were converted into official apartments.

By the end of the 19th century, the area in which the estate was located was quite noisy. Near the mayor's residence there were the Tver fire department, a political prison, a sobering station and a morgue. The night route of goldsmiths carrying out sewage from the city passed by the house. Nevertheless, the estate was one of the cultural centers of Moscow thanks to Governor General Vladimir Andreyevich Dolgorukov, who often held balls on the estate. According to rumors, the swindler Pavel Speyer, who ran the Jacks of Hearts Club, infiltrated one of these evenings under the guise of a wealthy landowner. He charmed Dolgorukov with small talk and asked permission to show the estate to a foreign friend. The next day, Speyer visited the house, accompanied by an English nobleman, and examined the estate under the supervision of the official on duty. As it turned out later, the fraudster introduced himself as the owner of the residence and entered into a sale deal with the foreigner, but the accompanying person could not understand this, since he did not know English.

During the tenure of Grand Duke Sergei Alexandrovich as governor, the building underwent a large-scale reconstruction under the leadership of architect Nikolai Sultanov. The estate was equipped with running water, a heating system, electricity, two elevators were installed, and the stables were rebuilt into a garage. At the order of the prince, an exhibition of portraits of all Moscow mayors was organized, as well as a collection of gifts donated to the city administration.

=== Mossoviet House ===
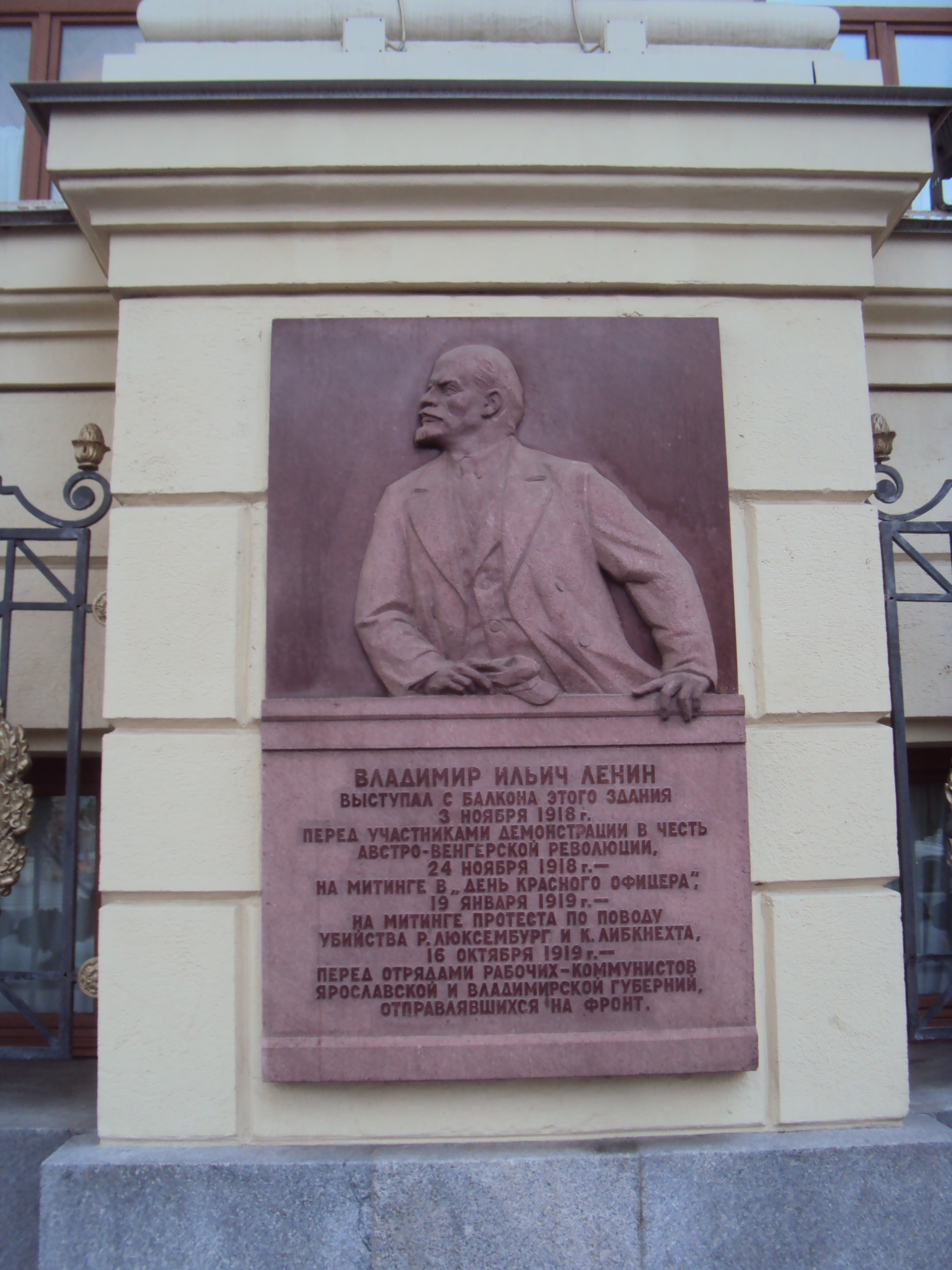
Memorial plaque on the wall of the Moscow City Hall, 2015

After the October Revolution, the former residence of the Governor General was occupied by the headquarters of the Red Guards and the Military Revolutionary Committee. In March 1917, the building was transferred to the department of the Council of Workers' and Soldiers' Deputies, which was later renamed the Mossoviet. After the government moved to the Kremlin, Vladimir Lenin spoke in this house several times. So, in 1919, from the balcony of the building, he made a speech to the communists going to the front. Later, this event formed the basis for the painting of the same name by Dmitry Nalbandyan, and was also immortalized on a commemorative plaque installed on the wall of the building.

In 1929–1930, the house was rebuilt according to the design of the architect Ivan Fomin. The estate complex was supplemented with a new six-story building in the constructivist style. It is located on the back side of the palace on the site of dismantled ancient wings. The structure was separated from the main building by stone arches with passages.

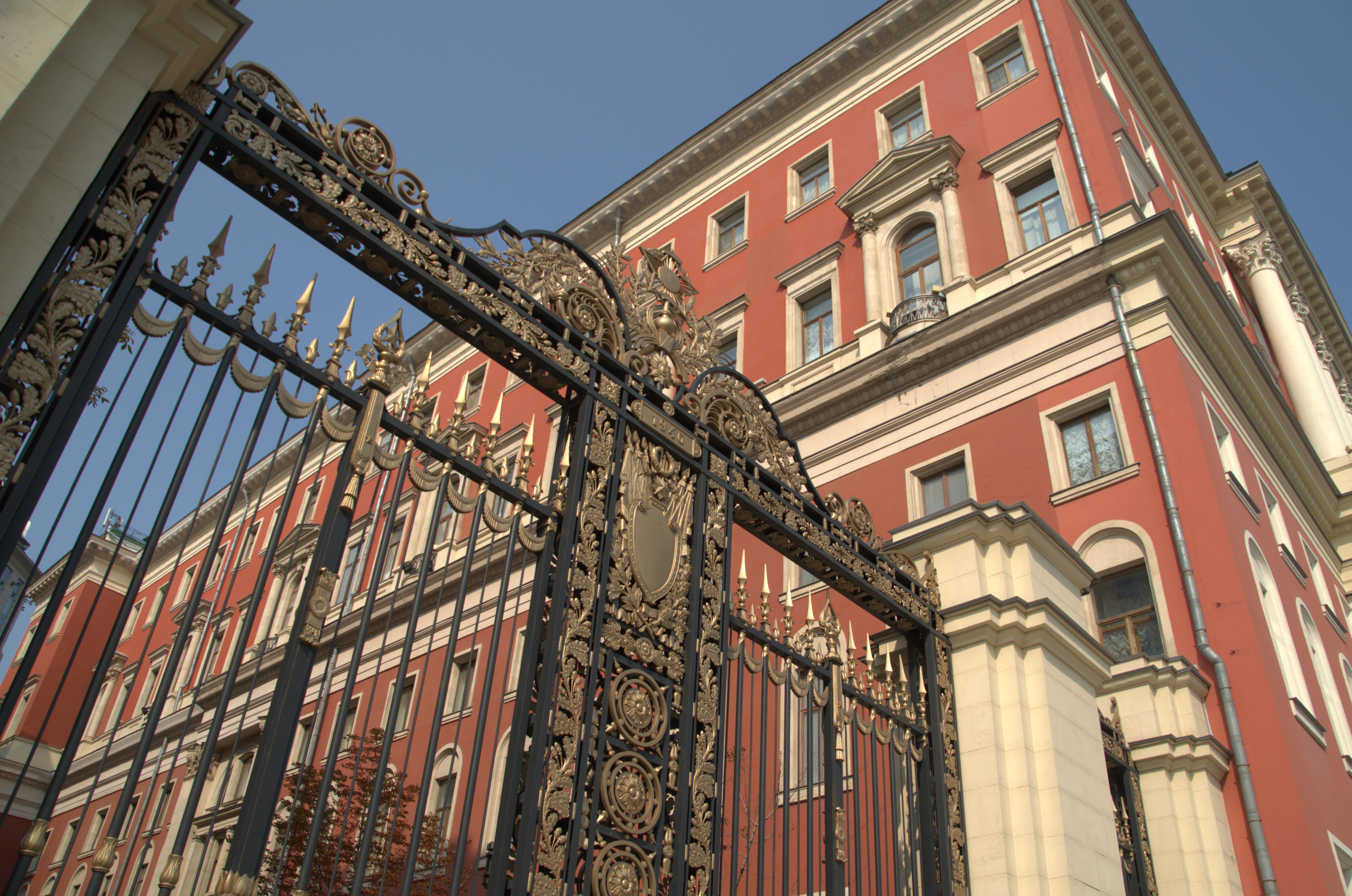
View of the entrance fence and the building, July 2016

In 1937, during the expansion of Tverskaya Street (at that time - Gorky Street), the Mossovet building was pushed beyond the red line by 13.65 meters. It was decided to preserve the historical building and move the house to the required distance. The implementation of the project was complicated by the significant age of the building and its design features: the white stone foundation was not strong, and on the ground floor of the building there was a ballroom that did not have internal supports. In addition, it was necessary to preserve the basements of the house, where the archive was kept at that time. On September 16, 1939, work began on moving the palace, weighing about 20 thousand tons. For these purposes, the structure was strengthened with a metal frame and the arches of the backyard, erected by Fomin, were dismantled. Transportation was carried out in front of a large gathering of Muscovites and the press. For propaganda purposes, the building was moved without interrupting the work of administrative employees; according to rumors, this caused mass layoffs of employees the day before. The entire process took 41 minutes, which became a new world record for the speed of moving a building.

By 1945, the Mossovet house was surrounded by taller buildings, and in order to preserve the majestic appearance of the building, they decided to build it with two floors. Initially, the reconstruction plan was prepared by Ivan Zholtovsky, but later he abandoned the project. The architect did not want to make the changes proposed by the Chairman of the Moscow Council, Georgy Popov:

I’m already an old man, why do I need people to say about me: this is the same architect who disfigured the house of the Governor-General

.

As a result, the work was entrusted to Dmitry Chechulin, who was assisted by Mikhail Posokhin, N.M. Molokov and M.I. Bogolepov. In order for the old walls of the lower floors to withstand the load of the superstructure, they were tightened with a massive metal-brick belt, masking it from the outside with a wide cornice. In addition, the building frame was reinforced with 24 metal columns. The lower part of the main façade was supplemented with pilasters of the colossal order, and the upper tier was supplemented with an eight-column portico. The central entrance was expanded and it acquired a resemblance to the Arc de Triomphe, which was typical for the architecture of that time. The house was repainted from yellow to dark red, highlighting certain parts with white. The walls were decorated with bas-reliefs by the sculptor Nikolai Tomsky and the State Emblem of the Soviet Union. The interior of the estate was restored under the leadership of architects G. M. Vulfson, A. Sherstneva and P. D. Korin. In honor of the 800th anniversary of Moscow, a massive bronze thermometer was installed on the gates of the building. In 1988, a partial restoration of the interior of the palace took place with the restoration of historical interiors.

=== Modern times ===
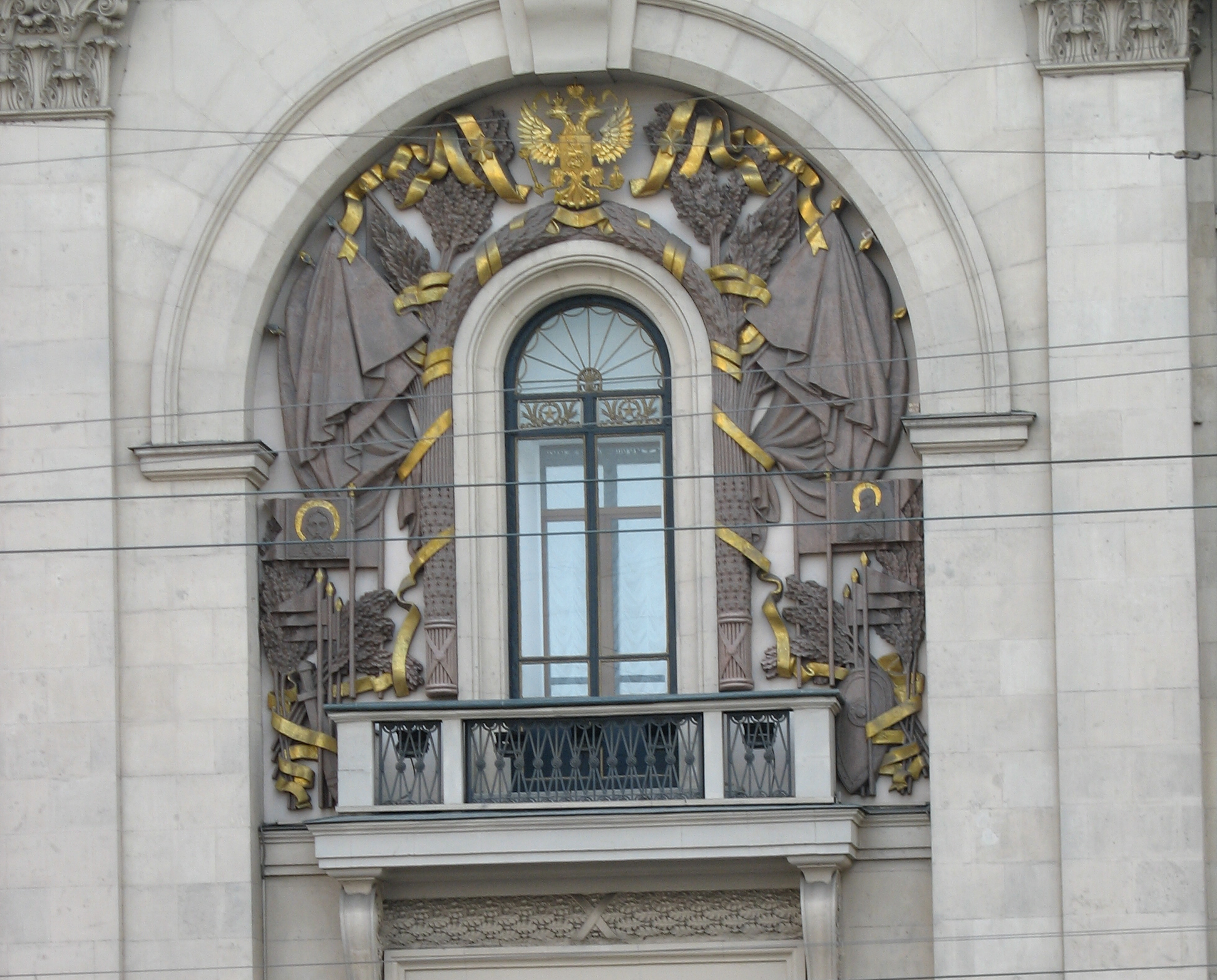
Bas-reliefs on the Moscow City Hall building, 2007

In 1993, the Moscow City Council was abolished, and the building on Tverskaya was converted into the residence of the Mayor of Moscow. In 1994, portraits of the capital's governors-general were returned from museum storage to the state rooms of the house. At the same time, the Soviet symbols that decorated the pediment of the house were replaced with the coat of arms of Moscow.

Since 2002, the City Hall building has been participating in the "Days of Historical and Cultural Heritage of Moscow" program. The first tour of the former residence of the governor general for schoolchildren was conducted by the mayor of the city, Yuri Luzhkov. Traditionally, weddings of Muscovites are held within the walls of the house on Krasnaya Gorka. Rallies and single pickets were repeatedly held near the building in order to attract public attention.

In 2013, a large-scale reconstruction of the architectural decoration of the house took place, funds for which were allocated from the city budget. During the work, decorative elements of the facade, wrought iron fences and balcony grilles were repaired, the roofing was partially renewed, drainpipes were replaced, and expansion joints in places of vertical cracks were eliminated.
