= Mossoviet =

City council in Moscow (1917–1993)

Moscow City Council Московский городской совет
- City council

Type
- Type: Unicameral

History
- Established: 14 November 1917; 108 years ago
- Disbanded: 7 October 1993; 32 years ago
- Preceded by: Moscow City Duma
- Succeeded by: Moscow City Duma

Structure
- Length of term: 5 years

Elections
- Last election: 1990

Meeting place
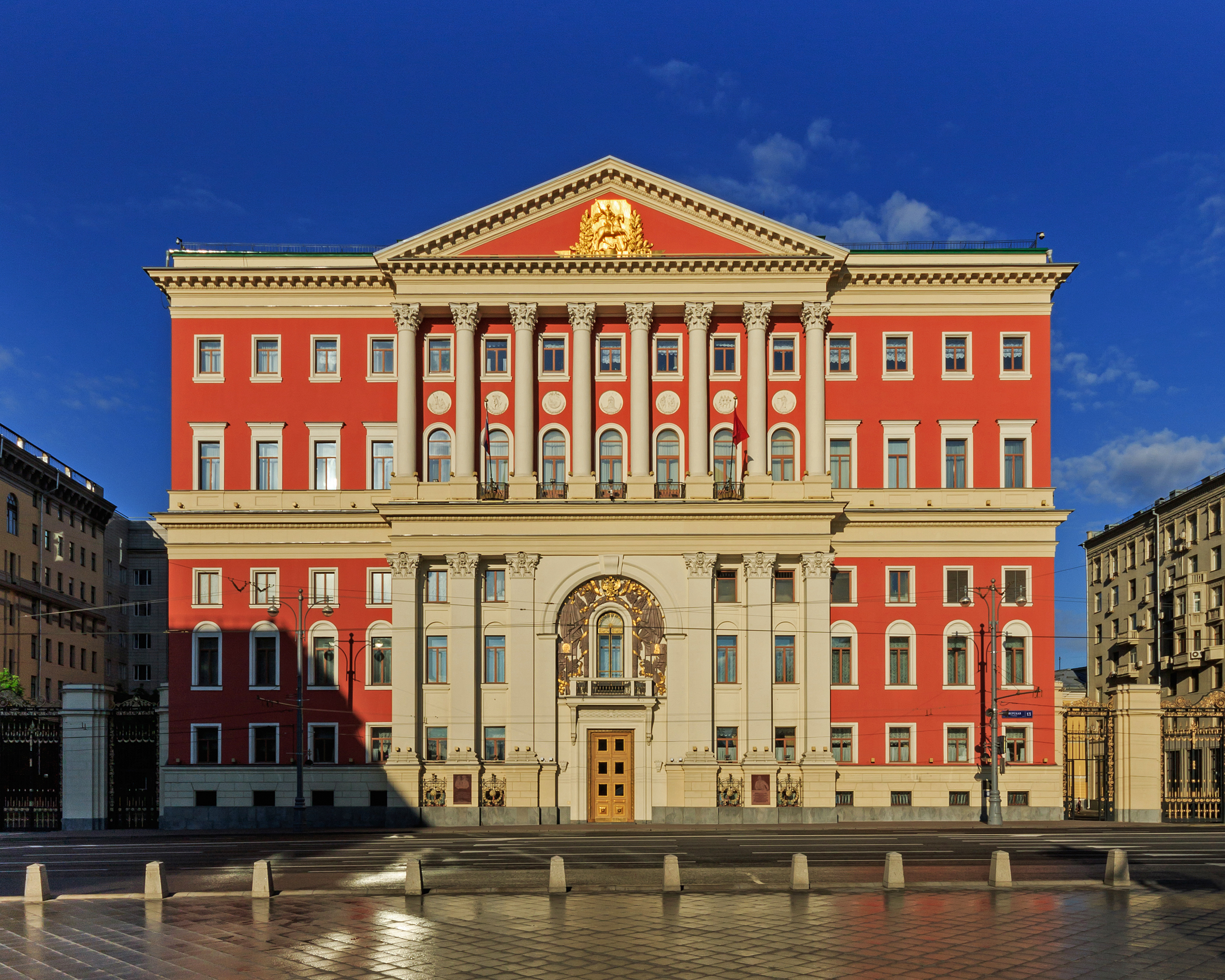
- Mossoviet Building

The Moscow City Council (Russian: Московский городской совет), in short Mossoviet (Russian: Моссовет), an abbreviation of Moscow Soviet (Russian: Московский Совет, romanized: Moskovskiy Sovet), was the local organ of municipal power established following the February Revolution 8–16 March 1917 [O.S. 23 Feb. – 3 Mar.]. Initially it was a parallel, shadow city administration of Moscow, Russia run by left-wing parties. Following the October Revolution it became the city administration of Moscow throughout the Soviet period (1918–1991).

== History ==
=== Initial period ===
The first meeting of the Moscow Soviet of Workers’ Deputies occurred on 1 March 1917. The meeting was initially attended by 52 delegates from various factories, cooperative societies and trade unions. However, when the meeting was reconvened in the evening after a short adjournment, the meeting had swollen to over six hundred delegates. An executive committee of 44 members was created under the leadership of Lev Khinchuk a member of the Menshevik faction of the Russian Social Democratic Labour Party.

=== After the Bolshevik seizure of power ===
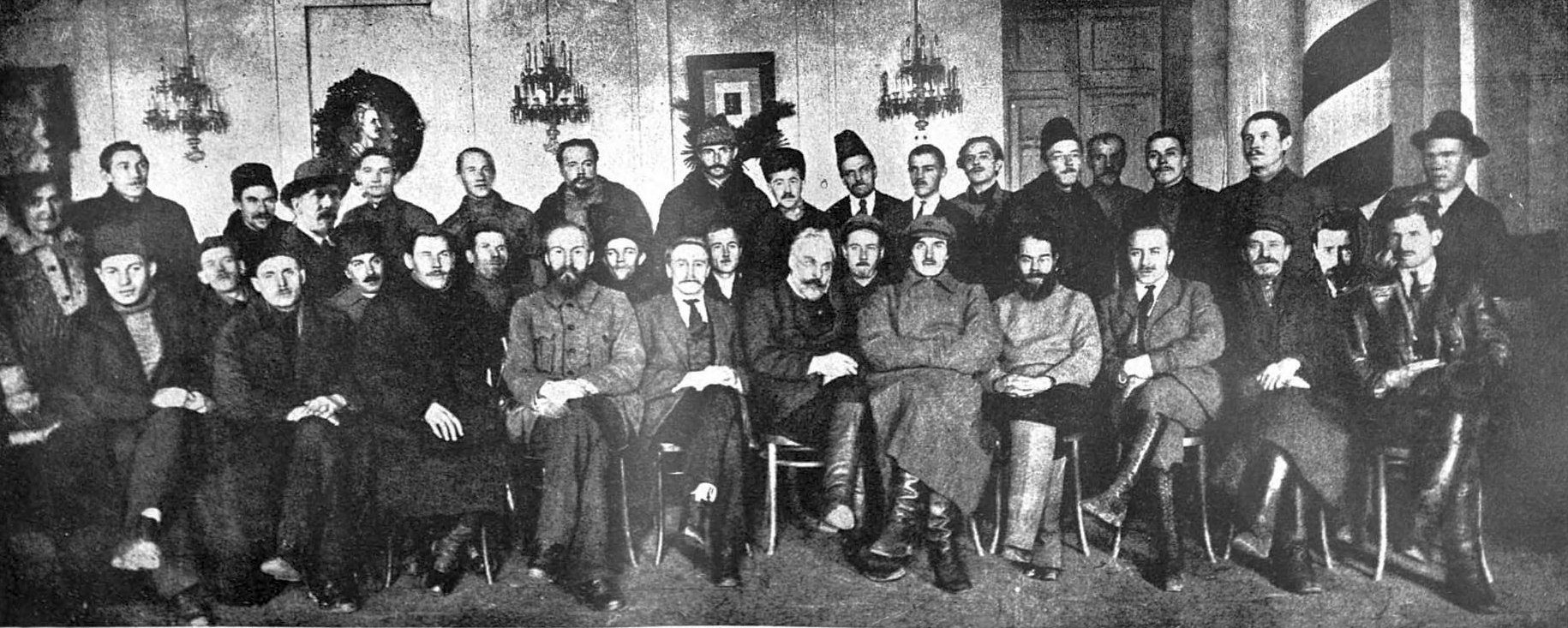
A group of members of the executive committee of the first convocation of the Moscow Soviet after the October Revolution. Sitting (from left to right): 1) Ignatov, 2) Ratekhin, 3) Korzinov, 4) Rozengolts, 5) Piskarev, 6) Salnikov, 7) Klestov 8) Borshevsky, 9) Feldman, 10) Kanygin, 11) Smidovich, 12) Gorkunov, 13) Sakharov, 14) Horns, 15) Lisitsin, 16) Radzivils, 17) Viktor Nogin 18) Pevunov. Standing (from left to right): 1) Temkina, 2) Ilyushin, 3) Merkulov, 4) Rykov, 5) Zamoryonov, 6) Budzinsky, 7) Obukh, 8) Smirnov, 9) Savin, 10) Semashko, 11) Isaev, 12) Voznesensky, 13) Burovtsev, 14) Belarusians, 15) Zheltov, 16) Bulochninov, 17) Fonchenko

Between 1918 and 1941, these two administrations were perceived as two distinct, although related, bodies. The Mossovet (Imeni Mossoveta) title was appended to the names of different institutions as an honorary title ("in the name of Mossovet") referring to 1917 events, i.e.

- Mossovet Theater (established 1924, and still operates under this name)

or as a sign of administrative control ("established by Mossovet") by the current administration, i.e.

- Mossovet Architectural Workshops (established 1932)
- Mossovet Kindergarten could mean a corporate kindergarten for City Hall staff, or any public kindergarten managed by the City

Designed in 1780s by Matvey Kazakov, it was shorn off its wings in 1939 and moved fourteen meters backward on rollers. By 1945 it was jacked up a storey, joined to a smaller house built in 1930s, sandwiched between new ground and attic floors, and fitted with a high-arched portico.
