= Moscow Urban Forum =

The Moscow Urban Forum (MUF) is an international forum about urbanization issues held in Moscow annually under the auspices of the Government of Moscow. The first MUF was held on 7-9 December 2011, the second took place 4-5 December 2012, and the third on 5-6 December 2013. MUF serves as a platform for open dialogue among representatives of the government, the managers of architectural and urban planning organizations, the real estate industry, the citizens of Moscow and leading foreign and Russian experts on urban planning. The Urban Land Institute is the international partner of MUF.

Various world renowned architects and urbanists have spoken at the forum, such as Rem Koolhaas, Patrick Schumacher, Jan Gehl, Ken Yeang & Baharash Bagherian.
