= Pavel Borodin =

Russian official and politician

- Павел Бородин
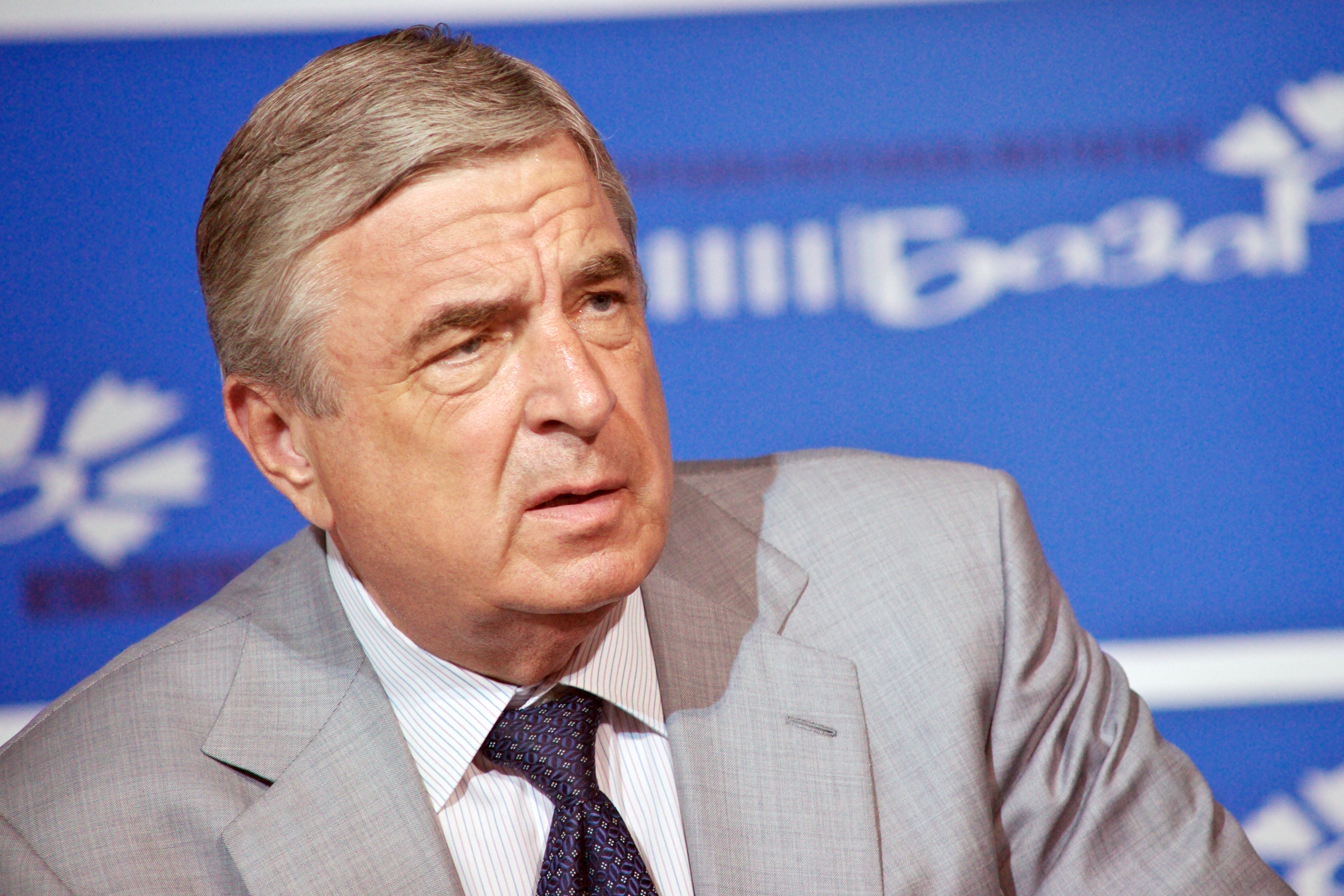
- Borodin in 2010
- Born: October 25, 1946 (age 79); Shakhunya, Gorky Oblast, RSFSR, Soviet Union
- Occupation: Politician
- Pavel Borodin's voice from the Echo of Moscow program, 18 May 2006

Pavel Pavlovich Borodin (Russian: Павел Павлович Бородин; born 25 October 1946) is a Russian official and politician. He holds the federal state civilian service rank of 1st class Active State Councillor of the Russian Federation.

== Early life and education ==
Borodin was born in the town of Shakhunya, near the city of Nizhny Novgorod (formerly known as Gorky during the Soviet period), in the Nizhny Novgorod Region. Shortly after his birth, the family moved to the city of Kyzyl in the Tuva Region, which lies in the far south of Siberia.

== Career ==
From 1993 to 1998, he served as Head of the Presidential Property Management Department of the Russian Federation. His deputy and eventual successor in this post was Vladimir Putin. According to investigative journalist Jake Bernstein (2019), Borodin, while in office, signed a contract with a Swiss firm to renovate the Grand Kremlin Palace. Further contracts followed, together with roughly $30 million in kickbacks that Borodin distributed to friends and fellow officials, among them then‑president Boris Yeltsin (p. 92).

Between 1998 and 2000, he was a member of the Interdepartmental Commission of the Security Council on Economic Security.

From 2000 to 2011, he served as State Secretary of the Union of Russia and Belarus.

In 2001, he was arrested in New York on charges of money laundering. He was subsequently released on bail of five million Swiss francs. The case was closed in 2002 and the bail was returned; further details have not been disclosed.

== Honours and awards ==
- Order of Merit for the Fatherland, 2nd class (3 October 1996) – for outstanding services to the state and many years of diligent work
- Order of Francysk Skaryna (Belarus)
- Order of Friendship of Peoples (Belarus, 11 December 2006) – for his great personal contribution to the development of comprehensive cooperation between Belarus and the Russian Federation, and to strengthening Belarusian‑Russian friendship
- Order of Merit (Moldova, 18 October 2001)
- Diploma of the Government of the Russian Federation (23 October 2006) – for services to the state and his contribution to the development and strengthening of Russian‑Belarusian relations
- Order of Honour (21 November 2011) – for his contribution to the establishment and development of the Union State and to the expansion of Russian‑Belarusian cooperation
- Order "For Services to the Motherland", 3rd class (Belarus, 25 October 2011)
- Order of Merit (Transnistria, 18 October 2001)
- State Prize of the Russian Federation (1996) – for the restoration of the Kremlin
- Honoured Worker of the Republic of Sakha (Yakutia)
- Honorary Citizen of the City of London (2009)

== See also ==
- Mabetex
- Carla Del Ponte
- Moscow Kremlin
- Behgjet Pacolli
