= Government of Moscow =

- Правительство Москвы

Overview
- Established: 12 December 1993 (current form)
- State: Russia
- Leader: Mayor of Moscow
- Appointed by: Mayor of Moscow
- Responsible to: Moscow City Duma; Mayor of Moscow
- Headquarters: Moscow City Hall Building, Tverskaya Street Moscow
- Website: mos.ru

The Government of Moscow (Russian: Правительство Москвы, pronounced [prɐˈvʲitʲɪlʲstvə mɐskˈvɨ]) is the highest executive body of state authority of Moscow. The Government of Moscow is headed by the highest official of the city of Moscow, i.e. the Mayor of Moscow.

The members of the Government of Moscow are the Mayor of Moscow, the Deputy Mayors of Moscow, and the Moscow Government ministers. The Government of Moscow issues orders that are signed by the Mayor of Moscow. The Government of Moscow has legal personality. The structure and functioning of the Government of Moscow are established by the law of Moscow, adopted by Moscow City Duma.

According to the Constitution of Russia, Moscow is a federal subject of Russia, known as a city of federal importance.

== See also ==
- Administrative divisions of Moscow
- Moscow City Duma
- Charter of the city of Moscow
- Federal cities of Russia
