= 2023 Moscow mayoral election =

Mayoral election in Moscow

- 10 September 2023
- Turnout: 42.49%
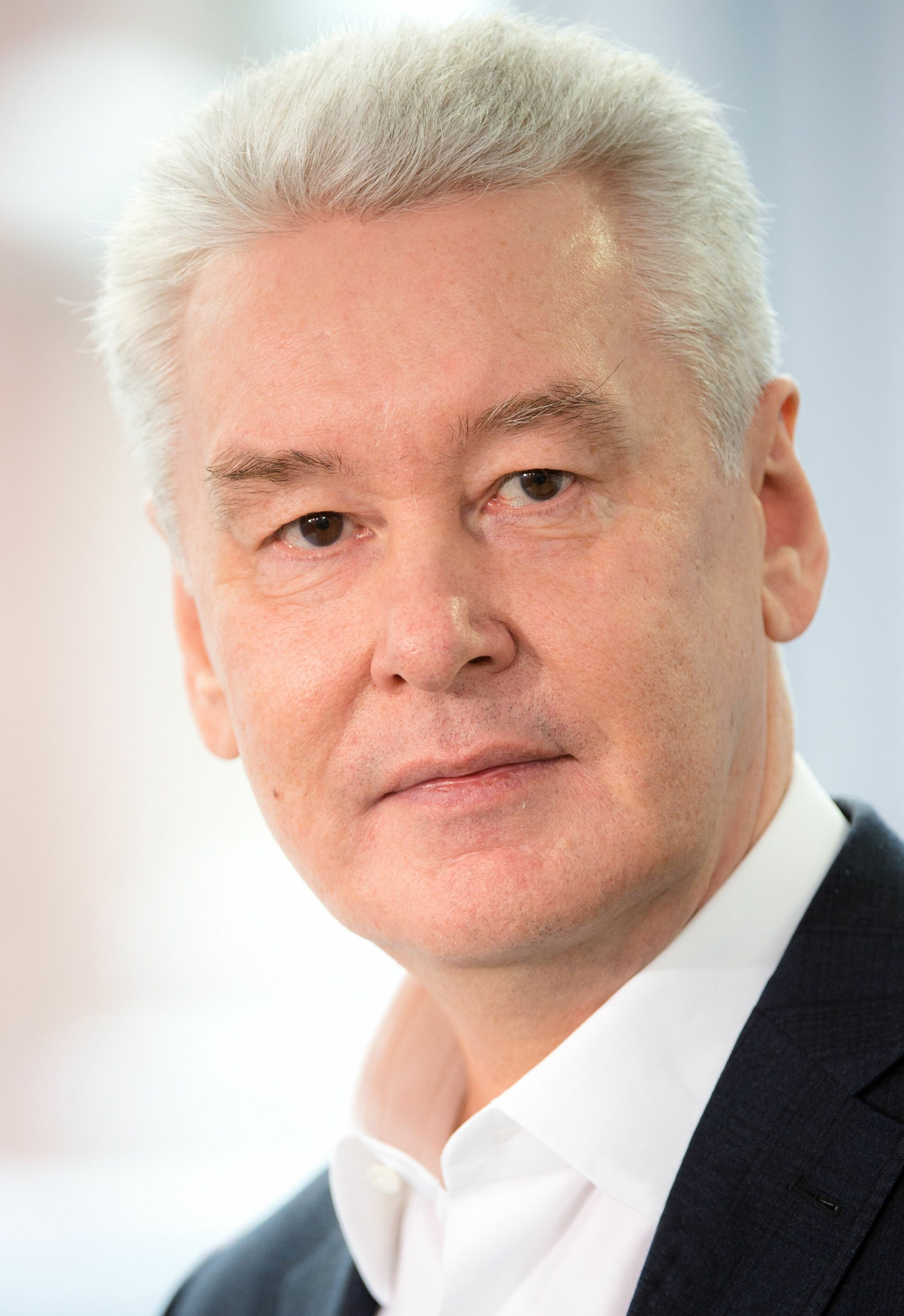

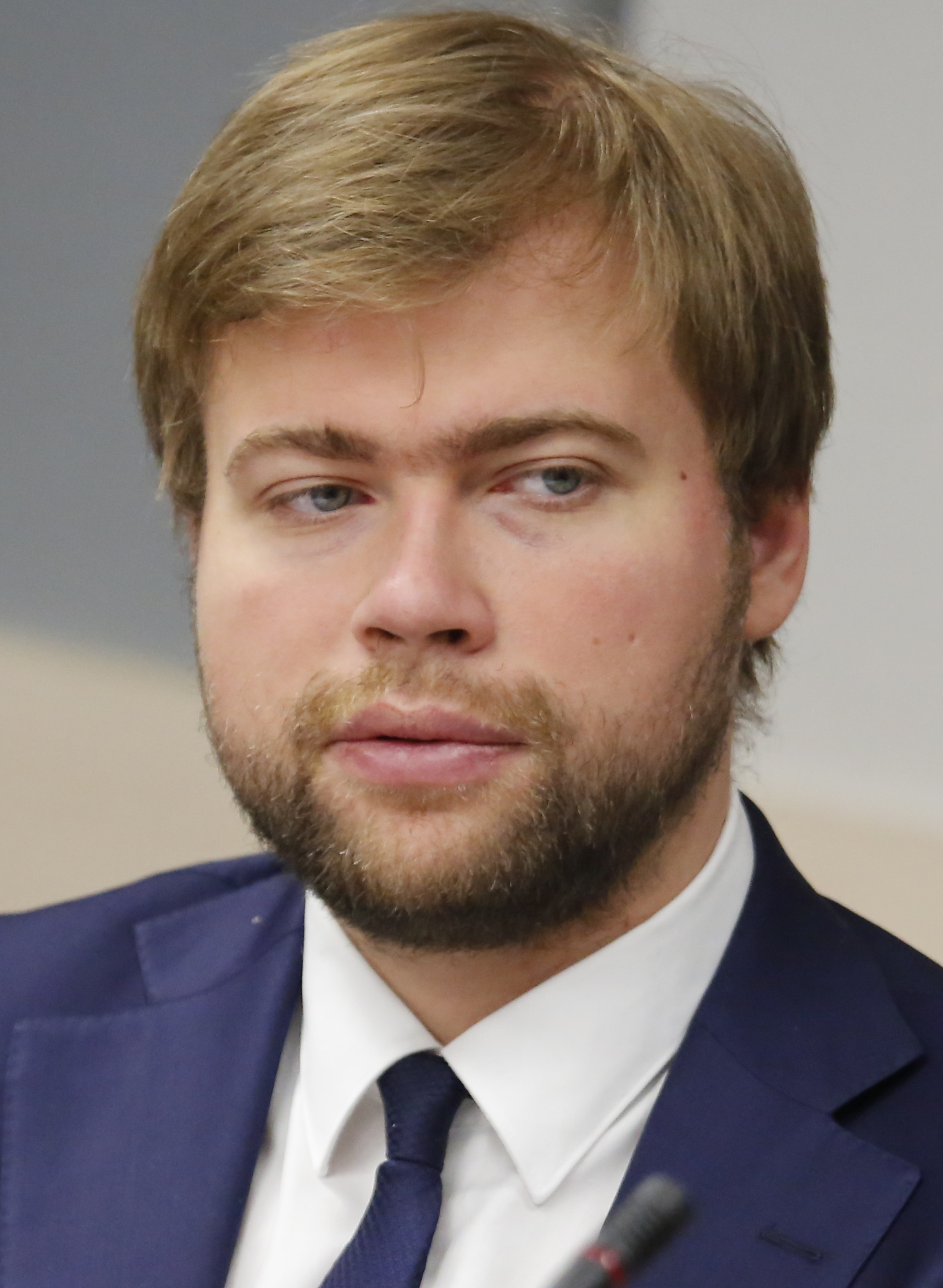

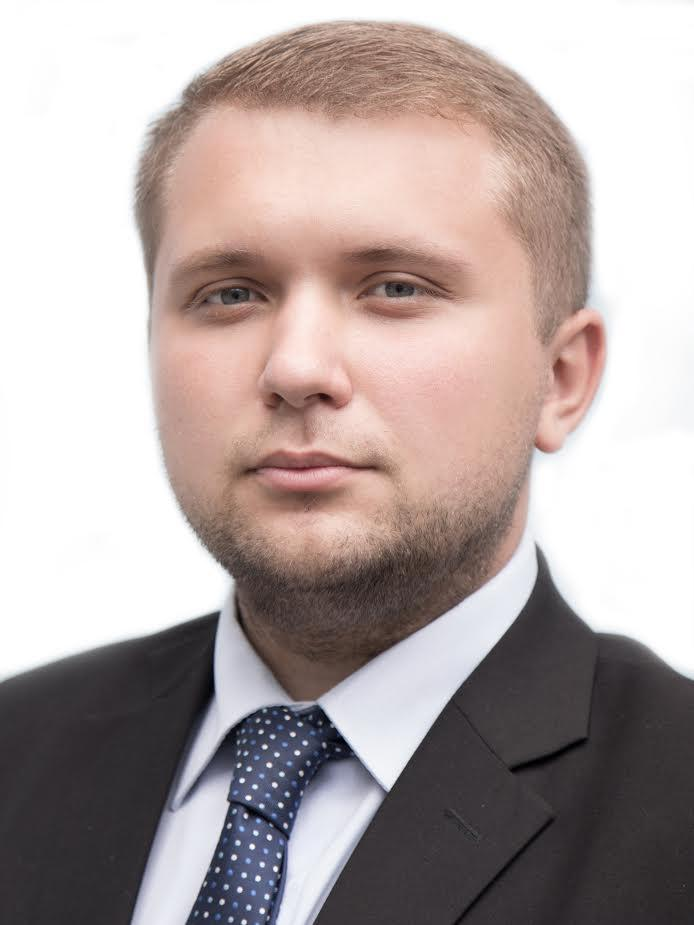

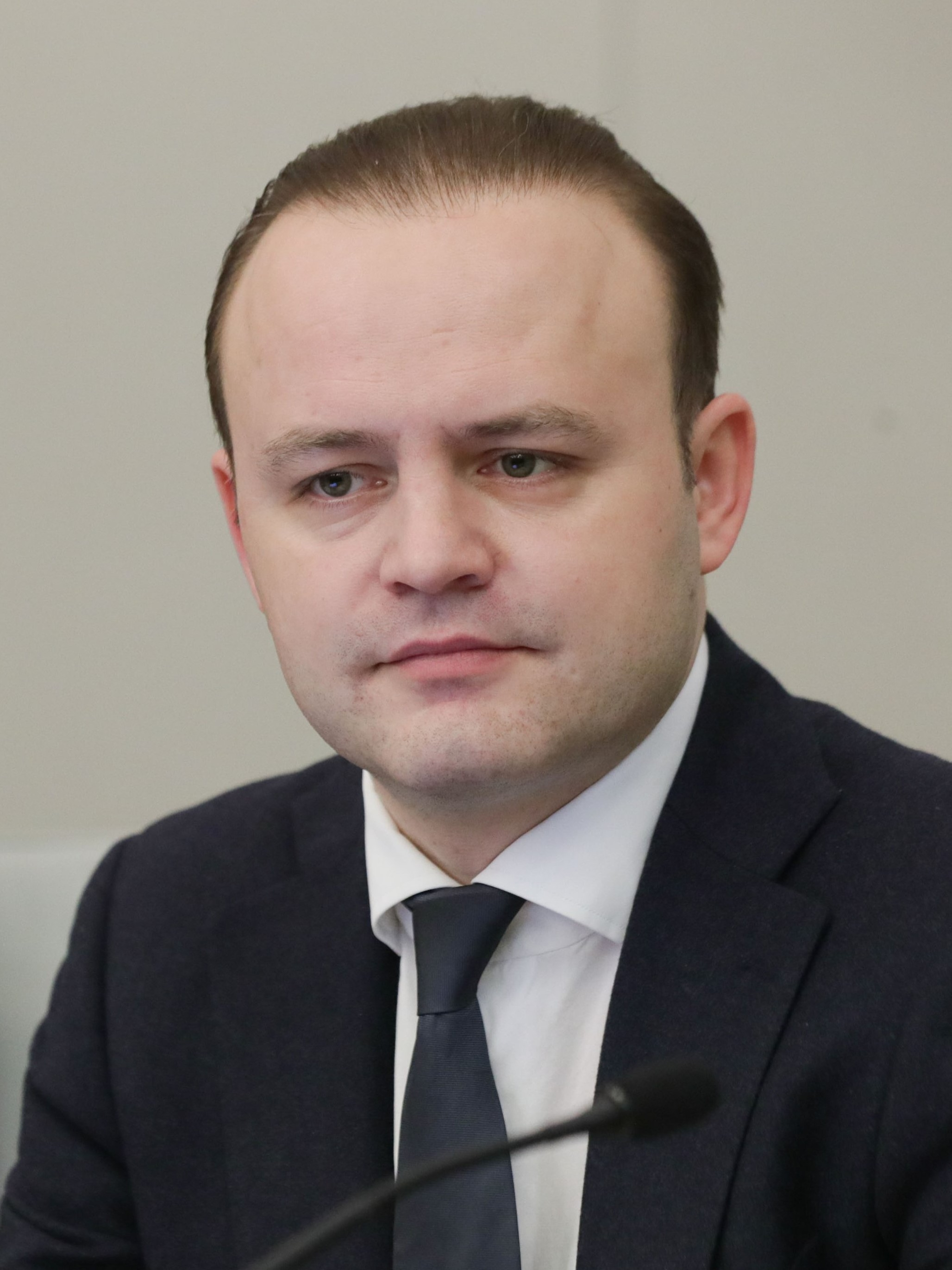
Candidate	Sergey Sobyanin	Leonid Zyuganov
Party	United Russia	CPRF
Popular vote	2,499,114	265,374
Percentage	76.86%	8.16%
Candidate	Boris Chernyshov	Vladislav Davankov
Party	LDPR	New People
Popular vote	183,529	174,869
Percentage	5.64%	5.38%
- Results by districts
Mayor before election
Sergey Sobyanin
United Russia
Elected Mayor
Sergey Sobyanin
United Russia

The 2023 Moscow mayoral election took place on 10 September 2023, on common election day. Incumbent Mayor Sergey Sobyanin was running to a fourth term in office. It was a landslide victory for Sobyanin, who was re-elected with 76% of the vote.

== Background ==
Deputy Prime Minister of Russia – chief of staff of the Government and former governor of Tyumen Oblast Sergey Sobyanin was appointed Mayor of Moscow in October 2010, replacing acting Mayor Vladimir Resin, who has been serving as city's top executive since longtime Mayor Yury Luzhkov's firing by President Dmitry Medvedev in September 2010. Sobyanin resigned in June 2013 and appointed acting Mayor to trigger an early election in September 2013. Despite being a member of the ruling United Russia party, Sobyanin ran as an independent and won the election with 51.37% of the vote, narrowly avoiding a runoff with a second-place finisher Alexei Navalny (PARNAS, 27.24%). Sobyanin ran for a third term in 2018 as an independent and overwhelmingly won the election with 70.17% of the vote.

During his administration, Sergey Sobyanin received positive remarks for resolving Moscow's transportation and social infrastructure problems, redeveloping of public spaces and bringing under control outdoor advertising and illegal construction. Moscow even hosted 2016 IIHF World Championship and 2018 FIFA World Cup. Sobyanin also spearheaded Russian efforts to combat COVID-19, leading the respective Working Group of the State Council of Russia. Sobyanin's success as Mayor prompted speculations about his potential promotion, allegedly he was a candidate for Prime Minister of Russia in early 2020, when Dmitry Medvedev resigned from the position, however, President Vladimir Putin appointed Mikhail Mishustin to lead the Government. On 10 September 2022, Moscow City Day, Putin endorsed Sobyanin for re-election, but Sobyanin has yet to publicly confirm his intention to run for another term.

Nevertheless, Sergey Sobyanin also received criticism for his infrastructure projects, most notably for mass renovation of housing stock, which was bashed for government overreach and forced relocation of citizens. Irregularities, Russian opposition claimed to be committed by Moscow's electoral authorities prior to the 2019 Moscow City Duma election, caused mass protests in the city, which were the largest political rallies in Russia since 2011–2013 protests. Subsequently, United Russia and Government of Moscow–aligned candidates won only a narrow majority in Moscow City Duma (25 of 45 seats). Alexei Navalny's FBK also attacked Moscow's officials, bringing forward allegations of corruption against Deputy Mayors Anastasia Rakova, Pyotr Biryukov, Aleksandr Gorbenko and Natalya Sergunina.

== Candidates ==
In Moscow candidates for Mayor can be nominated by registered political parties or by self-nomination. Candidates for Mayor of Moscow should be a Russian citizen and at least 30 years old. Candidates for Mayor should not have a foreign citizenship or residence permit. Each candidate in order to be registered is required to collect at least 6% of signatures of members and heads of municipalities (110–115 signatures). In the 2022 Moscow municipal elections neither party, besides United Russia and Sobyanin–aligned "My Raion" movement, won more than 1,200 seats in municipal councils, which means all mayoral candidates will need to reach agreement with United Russia in order to pass municipal filter. In addition, self-nominated candidates should collect 0.5% of signatures of Moscow residents (37,981–41,779 signatures). Also mayoral candidates present 3 candidacies to the Federation Council and election winner later appoints one of the presented candidates. In 2021 "On Common Principles of Organisation of Public Authority in the Subjects of the Russian Federation" law was enacted, which lifted term limits for Russian governors, including Mayor of Moscow.

=== Registered ===
Candidate name, age, political party		Political offices	Campaign	Registration date	Ref.
Boris Chernyshov (35); LDPR	Boris Chernyshov	Deputy Chairman of the State Duma (2021–present); Member of State Duma (2016–2020, 2021–present)	(VK)	12 July 2023	
Vladislav Davankov (42); New People	Vladislav Davankov	Deputy Chairman of the State Duma (2021–present); Member of State Duma (2021–present)	(Website, VK)	12 July 2023	
Dmitry Gusev (54); SRZP	Dmitry Gusev	Member of State Duma (2021–present)	(Website, VK)	12 July 2023	
Sergey Sobyanin (68); United Russia	Sergey Sobyanin	Incumbent Mayor of Moscow (2010–present)	(Website, VK)	10 July 2023	
Leonid Zyuganov (38); CPRF	Leonid Zyuganov	Member of Moscow City Duma (2014–present); grandson of CPRF leader Gennady Zyuganov	(Website, VK)	12 July 2023	

=== Did not file ===
- Iosif Dzhagaev (Independent), businessman
- Nasib Gasanov (Independent), pensioner
- Aleksandr Gorlov (Independent), electrician, 2013 mayoral candidate
- Pavel Novikov (Independent), charitable foundation director
- Aleksandra Tishchenko (Independent), businesswoman, Zhanna Gorbachyova's associate
- Sergey Zalyotin (PVR), former Member of Tula Oblast Duma (2004–2019), retired cosmonaut

=== Withdrawn ===
- Zhanna Gorbachyova (Independent), Member of Severnoye Tushino District Council of Deputies (2022–present) (endorsed Zyuganov)

=== Eliminated at convention ===
- Pyotr Tolstoy (United Russia), Deputy Chairman of the State Duma (2016–present)

=== Declined ===
==== CPRF ====
- Yury Afonin, Member of State Duma (2007–present)
- Andrey Klychkov, Governor of Oryol Oblast (2017–present), former Member of Moscow City Duma (2009–2017) (running for reelection)
- Vadim Kumin, Member of State Duma (2011–2016, 2020–present), 2018 mayoral candidate
- Nina Ostanina, Member of State Duma (1995–2011, 2021–present), Chairwoman of the Duma Committee on Issues of Family, Women, and Children (2021–present)
- Denis Parfenov, Member of State Duma (2016–present)
- Valery Rashkin, former Member of State Duma (1999–2022), 2000 Saratov Oblast gubernatorial candidate
- Pavel Tarasov, Member of Moscow City Duma (2019–present)
- Anastasia Udaltsova, Member of State Duma (2022–present)
- Nikolay Zubrilin, Member of Moscow City Duma (2014–present)

==== LDPR ====
- Viktor Bout, convicted arms dealer
- Dmitry Koshlakov-Krestovsky, coordinator of LDPR city office (2022–present)
- Stanislav Naumov, Member of State Duma (2021–present)
- Yaroslav Nilov, Member of State Duma (2011–present), Chairman of the Duma Committee on Labour, Social Policy and Veterans' Affairs (2016–present)
- Leonid Slutsky, Member of State Duma (1999–present), Chairman of the Duma Committee on International Affairs (2016–present), Leader of LDPR (2022–present)
- Andrey Svintsov, Member of State Duma (2011–2021, 2022–present)
- Dmitry Svishchev, Member of State Duma (2007–present), Chairman of the Duma Committee on Sport and Physical Culture (2015–2016, 2021–present)

==== New People ====
- Sardana Avksentyeva, Member of State Duma (2021–present), former mayor of Yakutsk (2018–2021)
- Alexander Demin, Member of State Duma (2021–present), Chairman of the Duma Committee on Small and Medium Enterprises (2021–present), 2022 Sverdlovsk Oblast gubernatorial candidate
- Oleg Leonov, Member of State Duma (2021–present)
- Aleksey Nechayev, Member of State Duma (2021–present), Leader of New People (2020–present)
- Dmitry Pevtsov, Member of State Duma (2021–present)
- Sangadji Tarbaev, Member of State Duma (2021–present), Chairman of the Duma Committee on Tourism and Tourism Infrastructure (2021–present)

==== SR–ZP ====
- Mikhail Delyagin, Member of State Duma (2021–present)
- Sergey Kabyshev, Member of State Duma (2021–present), Chairman of the Duma Committee on Science and Higher Education (2021–present)
- Dmitry Kuznetsov, Member of State Duma (2021–present)
- Yevgeny Prilepin, Co-chairman of A Just Russia — For Truth (2021–present), writer, former Member of State Duma (2021)
- Ilya Sviridov, Member of Tagansky District Council of Deputies (2012–present), former Head of Tagansky District (2014–2021), 2018 mayoral candidate
- Mikhail Timonov, Member of Moscow City Duma (2019–present)

==== Other ====
- Irina Kopkina (Yabloko), former Member of Strogino District Council of Deputies (2017–2022)
- Nikolai Kuryanovich, former Member of State Duma (2003–2007), Russian nationalist, 2013 ROS mayoral candidate
- Sergey Mitrokhin (Yabloko), Member of Moscow City Duma (2005–2009, 2019–present), former Member of State Duma (1994–2003), 2013 and 2018 mayoral candidate
- Samson Sholademi, Member of Lefortovo District Council of Deputies (2022–present), journalist, 2013 mayoral candidate
- Maxim Suraykin (Communists of Russia), former Deputy Chairman of the Legislative Assembly of Ulyanovsk Oblast (2018–2022), former chairman of Communists of Russia (2012–2022), 2013 mayoral candidate, 2018 presidential candidate

=== Candidates for Federation Council ===
- Boris Chernyshov (LDPR):
  - Ksenia Inozemtseva, Member of Perovo District Council of Deputies (2022–present), school principal
  - Pavel Ramensky, Member of Dorogomilovo District Council of Deputies (2022–present), physician
  - Andrey Svintsov, Member of State Duma (2011–2021, 2022–present)
- Vladislav Davankov (New People):
  - Stanislav Druzhinin, president of Russian Diving Federation (2021–present)
  - Sergey Dyomin (Party of Growth), businessman
  - Sangadji Tarbaev, Member of State Duma (2021–present), Chairman of the Duma Committee on Tourism and Tourism Infrastructure (2021–present)
- Dmitry Gusev (SR–ZP):
  - Olga Budina, actress
  - Nikolay Burlyaev, Member of State Duma (2021–present)
  - Mikhail Delyagin, Member of State Duma (2021–present)
- Leonid Zyuganov (CPRF):
  - Vadim Kumin, Member of State Duma (2011–2016, 2020–present), 2018 mayoral candidate
  - Denis Parfenov, Member of State Duma (2016–present)
  - Nikolay Zubrilin, Member of Moscow City Duma (2014–present)

== Finances ==
All sums are in rubles.

Financial Report	Source	Chernyshov	Davankov	Dzhagayev	Gorbachyova	Gorlov	Gusev	Sobyanin	Tishchenko	Zalyotin	Zyuganov
First		93,600	3,275,600	0	179,688	0	100,000	500,000	600,000	46,600	150,101
Final		33,210,694	63,005,601	0	179,688	0	5,350,000	209,750,000	600,000	46,600	23,135,101

== Polls ==
Fieldwork date	Polling firm	Sobyanin	Zyuganov	Chernyshov	Gusev	Davankov	None	Undecided	Lead
25 August – 1 September 2023	PRISP	63%	7%	4%	2%	6%	3%	16%	55%
3–5 August 2023	Russian Field	66%	5%	2%	2%	<1%	8%	14%	61%
26 July – 3 August 2023	WCIOM	78%	7%	5%	2%	6%	2%	–	71%
12–13 May 2023	Russian Field	67%	6%	1%	1%	<1%	12%	12%	61%

== Results ==
Candidate	Party	Votes	%
Sergey Sobyanin	United Russia	2,499,114	76.86
Leonid Zyuganov	Communist Party	265,374	8.16
Boris Chernyshov	Liberal Democratic Party	183,529	5.64
Vladislav Davankov	New People	174,869	5.38
Dmitry Gusev	A Just Russia – For Truth	128,701	3.96
Total		3,251,587	100.00
Valid votes		3,251,587	99.39
Invalid/blank votes		20,070	0.61
Total votes		3,271,657	100.00
Registered voters/turnout		7,700,590	42.49
Source: Moscow City Electoral Commission

Mayor Sobyanin re-appointed incumbent senator Vladimir Kozhin to the Federation Council.

== See also ==
- 2023 Russian regional elections
