= SU-155 =

Russian vertically integrated group of companies

SU-155 Group of Companies Группа компаний "СУ-155"
- Type: Private conglomerate
- Industry: Building construction, Real estate development, Mechanical engineering
- Founded: 1993
- Defunct: 2015
- Headquarters: Moscow, Russia
- Area served: Russia
- Key people: Mikhail Balakin; Ilya Mikhalchuk
- Revenue: ▲US$3,58 billion (YE2013)
- Website: SU-155 (in English), SU-155 (in Russian)

SU-155 Group (Russian: СУ-155) was a Russian vertically integrated group of companies which had been a leader in the Russian building construction industry. Besides building construction and real estate development, the group conducted activities in construction and non-metallic materials manufacturing, mechanical engineering, and investing in land, engineering and public infrastructure. The group headquarters was located in Moscow.

As of 2013, the SU-155 group operates in 54 different Russian cities. More than 100 companies are part of the group: construction material businesses, contractor/construction organizations, non-metallic natural resource procurement enterprises, mechanical engineering outfits, and service companies. The legal name of the group's head company is Closed Joint-Stock Company "SU-155" (Russian: Закрытое акционерное общество СУ-155).

In 2015, the company was declared bankrupt.

== History ==
The group traces its history to 1954, when the entity "Stroymontazhtrest Number 3", later renamed to "Construction Management Number 155", was created in the Glavmosstroy system. In 1993 the entity was transformed into a closed joint-stock company. From the beginning of the 2000s, the Group systematically widened its presence in the country's regions, purchasing or creating building construction companies and manufacturing enterprises.

== Ownership and management ==
The primary owner and chairman of the board (as of 2014) is Mikhail Balakin, who in 2014 was listed as number 52 on the Forbes list of 200 richest Russian businessmen and listed as number 866 on the Forbes list of the world's billionaires with assets worth $1.9 billion.

The CEO of LLC East-Siberian Construction Company (part of SU-155 Group) is the former mayor of Yakutsk (1998-2007) and former governor of Arkhangelsk region (2008-2012), Ilya Mikhalchuk.

== Structure ==
SU-155 Group has grown over 20 years from a small construction company into a vertically integrated group of manufacturing and production companies with a closed production cycle: its structure contains assets allowing for business integration at all stages of the supply chain.

Overall, SU-155 Group declares the presence in its structure of:

- 18 real estate developer companies
- 22 contractor companies
- 5 mechanical engineering factories
- 30 construction materials enterprises
- 4 architectural design companies
- 2 estate agent companies
- 2 transportation companies
- 1 finance company

In Serpukhov (Moscow Oblast), SU-155 is building a manufacturing cluster worth more than 10 billion roubles (295 million US$ or 215 million €), which will include a Serpukhov Elevator Manufacturing Plant launched in 2013, along with a fittings manufacturing factory and a steel structure production enterprise. It is estimated that the turnover of all the new cluster's enterprises combined will reach 25 billion roubles (740 million US$ or 540 million €) per year.

In 2013–2014, the Group announced and began the construction of new manufacturing enterprises in Penza, Iskitim (Novosibirsk Oblast) and Volgograd.

Previously, Mikhail Balakin (majority shareholder of CJSC SU-155) owned a 48.15% stake in the NS Bank (Independent Construction Bank), but in April 2013, he sold his shares in the bank to the management.

In April 2014, SU-155 withdrew from all companies providing housing and utility services previously included in the Group, selling shares to those companies' managements.

== Operations ==
SU-155 operates in the Central (Moscow and the Bryansk, Vladimir, Ivanovo, Kaluga, Kostroma, Moscow, Ryazan, Tver, Tula, and Yaroslavl Regions), Northwestern (St. Petersburg and the Kaliningrad and Leningrad Regions), Volga (Nizhny Novgorod and Penza Regions), Southern (Volgograd Region) and Siberian (Omsk and Novosibirsk Regions and Krasnoyarsk Krai) Federal Districts - 20 regions in total as of 2014.

SU-155 Group's turnover as of 2013 amounted to 114.2 billion roubles (3.36 billion US$ or 2.46 billion €) (in 2012 - 84.3 billion roubles, and in 2011 - 82.7 billion roubles), including housing sales amounting to 74.8 billion roubles (2.2 billion US$ or 1.61 billion €).

In 2013, the Group built 1.65 million sq. m. of property (in 2012 - 1.43 million sq. m., and in 2011 - 1.3 million sq. m.), including more than 513 thousand sq. m. built outside of Moscow and the Moscow Region, which amounts to almost 31% of the overall amount of construction (in 2012, almost 640 thousand sq. metres was built in the regions, 45% of the overall amount of construction; in 2011 - 500 thousand sq. m., corresponding to 37%). In 2013, the Group beat the industry (and its own) record of 1.51 million sq. m. of housing built by the company in 2009.

The company is the leading property real estate developer in Russia by revenue from property sales in 2013 (by Vedomosti):

- SU-155 Group - 74.8 billion roubles (2.2 billion US$ or 1.61 billion €)
- PIK Group - 62.96 billion roubles (1.85 billion US$ or 1.36 billion €)
- LSR Group - 60 billion roubles (1.76 billion US$ or 1.29 billion €)

The company is the leading construction company in Russia by revenue in 2013 (by RBC Magazine):

- SU-155 Group - 3,58 billion US$ (2,71 billion US$ in 2012, 2,81 billion US$ in 2011)
- Tashir Group - 3,30 billion US$ (2,9 billion US$ in 2012, 2,6 billion US$ in 2011)
- Absolut Group - 2,82 billion US$ (2,83 billion US$ in 2012, 2,93 billion US$ in 2011)

In 2013, SU-155 launched 21 public facilities in Russia: 4 schools, 14 nurseries and 3 polyclinics - this is 42% more by capacity in nurseries and 30% more by capacity in schools than 2012 figures. SU-155 Group spent around 1.9 billion roubles (55 million US$ or 41 million €) on building and fitting out public infrastructure facilities in 2013 - 18% more than in 2012.

== Charitable activities ==
In 2002–2005, SU-155 Group reconstructed the St. Nicholas Cathedral in Serpukhov, founded in the 16th century. After the Great October Revolution, the cathedral housed the city's pasta factory for a time. During the Great Patriotic War, the belfry was torn down and laundries were set up in the building. Later, it was used as a warehouse.

In 2009–2012, through the efforts of SU-155 and other companies, the Kronstadt Naval Cathedral of St. Nicholas the Wondermaker was restored. The cathedral was closed in 1929, and in Soviet times, it served as a movie theater, quarters for Baltic Fleet officers, a concert hall, and a branch of the Central Naval Museum.

In 2014, with the support of SU-155 Group, construction continued on a chapel dedicated to the church containing the icon of Our Lady “Queen of All Creation” in Shcherbinka, which had come to a halt after the foundation was laid when funds collected for the project ran out.

Apart from the aforementioned churches, in the 2000s SU-155 Group restored a Sunday school at the Church of Sts. Boris and Gleb in Zyuzino (Moscow) and the burnt out church of Holy Father Sergius of Radonezh in Verkhnyaya Vereya (Nizhny Novgorod region). It also built the Church of the Intercession of the Theotokos in Yasenevo (Moscow), and the Church of the Intercession in Ivanovo.

== Criticism and discussions in the mass media ==
=== Construction delays ===
Throughout 2008–2012, individual companies in SU-155 Group were repeatedly criticized for serious delays in delivering houses, for postponing under various pretexts the settling of residents and finalization of ownership rights over apartments, and for the lack of heating, hot water and electricity in already settled homes for many months. Purchasers of SU-155 apartments held multiple meetings and protests in Moscow.

=== Claims by the Moscow authorities ===
In May 2011, SU-155 was subject to criticism from the Mayor of Moscow, Sergey Sobyanin. According to the Mayor, in 2009, the city purchased 187 thousand sq. m. of residential housing for 10 billion roubles (295 million US$ or 215 million €) from SU-155, but by Spring 2011, these residential buildings had not yet been settled and the deficiencies had not been corrected. The Moscow mayor's office initiated a claim in court, but SU-155 was able to prove to the court that the breakdown of construction timeframes was caused by the mayor's office, which delayed in providing a construction zone.

In February 2013, the Department of Economic Policy & Development of the City of Moscow initiated a claim against SU-155 in the Moscow City Arbitration Court, demanding that the company return 3.5 billion roubles (102 million US$ or 75 million €) to the budget. In May 2013, the conflict was resolved by peaceful agreement, in accordance with which the Department of Economic Policy & Development of the City of Moscow maintains its contract with SU-155 and renounces its financial demands. In turn, SU-155 will return 256.5 million roubles (7.5 million US$ or 5.5 million €) to the city budget of Moscow, which the company received as an advance, and will also build 7 out of the 8 planned buildings.

=== Changes in the planning of already sold structures ===
In November 2012, the company was subject to criticism for independently changing the designs of several homes in the Novaya Tryokhgorka community: the size of apartments and the shape of rooms were changed. In June 2013, SU-155 signed an agreement with a residents' public interest group (a social charter), which, among other things, secured a return to the initial plans of the apartments, and also the construction of a children's art school for the community's residents, previously not part of the project.

== Interesting fact ==
In 2009, SU-155 won the rights to the internet domain name su155.net by court action, which previously hosted the website "SU-155: the myths and reality, the website of cheated co-investors in SU-155", created by displeased clients. The domain, registered by the Australian registrar Melbourne IT to a resident of the United Kingdom, was adjudged by a developer in the commercial court attended by the World Intellectual Property Organization (WIPO).

== See also ==
- Mikhail Balakin
