= Nyaksimvol =

Nyaksimvol Няксимволь
- Selo

Other transcription(s)
  - Mansi: Ня̄хщамво̄ль, Ня̄хсямво̄ль
- Interactive map of Nyaksimvol
- Location of Nyaksimvol Nyaksimvol (Khanty–Mansi Autonomous Okrug)
- Coordinates: 62°27′N 60°53′E
- Country: Russia
- Federal subject: Khanty-Mansi Autonomous Okrug
- Administrative district: Beryozovsky District

Population (2010 Census)
  - Total: 510
  - Estimate (2010): 506 (−0.8%)
- Time zone: UTC+5 (MSK+2)
- Postal code: 628143
- Dialing code: +7 34674
- OKTMO ID: 71812437106

Nyaksimvol (Russian: Някси́мволь, Mansi: Ня̄хщамво̄ль) is a rural locality (a selo) in Beryozovsky District of Khanty-Mansi Autonomous Okrug, Russia, located on the left bank of the Severnaya Sosva River, 60 kilometers (37 mi) southwest of Khulimsunt.

== Etymology ==
Its name derives from the Mansi words ня̄хсям (nâ̄hsâm) "gill" and во̄ль (vōlʹ) "river section", and hence means "gill river section". In writing it is used with the word па̄выл (pāvyl) "village".

== Climate ==
Nyaksimvol has a subarctic climate (Köppen climate classification Dfc). Winters are frigid with average temperatures from −24.2 to −14.9 °C (−11.6 to 5.2 °F) in January, while summers are mild with average temperatures from +11.2 to +23.3 °C (52.2 to 73.9 °F) in July. Precipitation is moderate and is somewhat higher in summer than at other times of the year.

Climate data for Nyaksimvol
Month	Jan	Feb	Mar	Apr	May	Jun	Jul	Aug	Sep	Oct	Nov	Dec	Year
Record high °C (°F)	3.7 (38.7)	5.7 (42.3)	16.4 (61.5)	25.5 (77.9)	32.2 (90.0)	36.2 (97.2)	36.1 (97.0)	34.2 (93.6)	28.2 (82.8)	21.6 (70.9)	9.1 (48.4)	5.0 (41.0)	36.2 (97.2)
Mean daily maximum °C (°F)	−15.2 (4.6)	−11.2 (11.8)	−1.6 (29.1)	6.1 (43.0)	13.8 (56.8)	20.3 (68.5)	23.5 (74.3)	18.9 (66.0)	12.1 (53.8)	3.8 (38.8)	−7.4 (18.7)	−12.9 (8.8)	4.2 (39.5)
Daily mean °C (°F)	−19.4 (−2.9)	−16.7 (1.9)	−7.3 (18.9)	0.4 (32.7)	7.6 (45.7)	14.2 (57.6)	17.4 (63.3)	13.3 (55.9)	7.6 (45.7)	0.3 (32.5)	−11.0 (12.2)	−16.8 (1.8)	−0.9 (30.4)
Mean daily minimum °C (°F)	−23.7 (−10.7)	−21.7 (−7.1)	−12.9 (8.8)	−4.8 (23.4)	1.9 (35.4)	8.4 (47.1)	11.4 (52.5)	8.4 (47.1)	3.7 (38.7)	−2.9 (26.8)	−14.5 (5.9)	−20.8 (−5.4)	−5.6 (21.9)
Record low °C (°F)	−50.8 (−59.4)	−49.6 (−57.3)	−44.4 (−47.9)	−35.2 (−31.4)	−18.9 (−2.0)	−5.5 (22.1)	−1.4 (29.5)	−3.5 (25.7)	−11.9 (10.6)	−32.9 (−27.2)	−46.3 (−51.3)	−51.6 (−60.9)	−51.6 (−60.9)
Average precipitation mm (inches)	27.9 (1.10)	21.6 (0.85)	26.5 (1.04)	35.4 (1.39)	45.0 (1.77)	72.4 (2.85)	69.9 (2.75)	78.0 (3.07)	56.6 (2.23)	41.0 (1.61)	33.8 (1.33)	26.3 (1.04)	534.4 (21.03)
Average rainy days	0.1	0	1	7	14	15	14	18	18	9	2	0	98.1
Average snowy days	18	15	13	8	2	0.3	0	0	1	8	16	18	99.3
Average relative humidity (%)	81	77	71	66	63	66	71	78	81	80	82	81	75
Mean monthly sunshine hours	34	82	148	191	256	291	291	217	117	84	47	19	1,777
Source 1: pogoda.ru.net
Source 2: NOAA (sun only, 1961-1990)

== Notable people ==
- Sergey Sobyanin, Russian politician who was born here
