= 2018 Moscow mayoral election =

← 2013	9 September 2018	2023 →
- Registered: 7,216,076
- Turnout: 2,255,698 (30.91%)
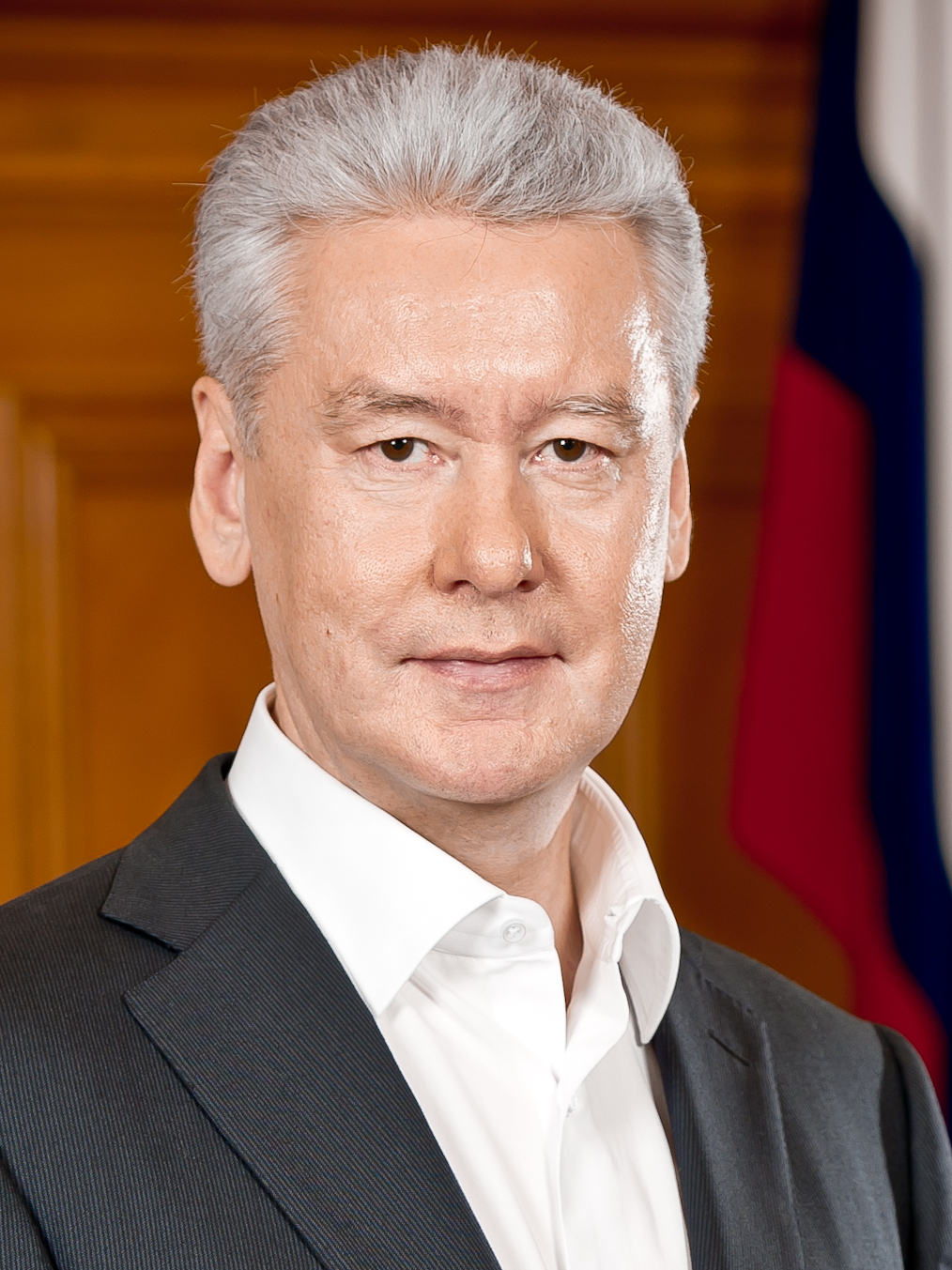

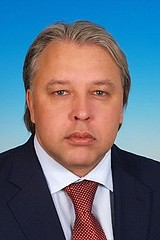

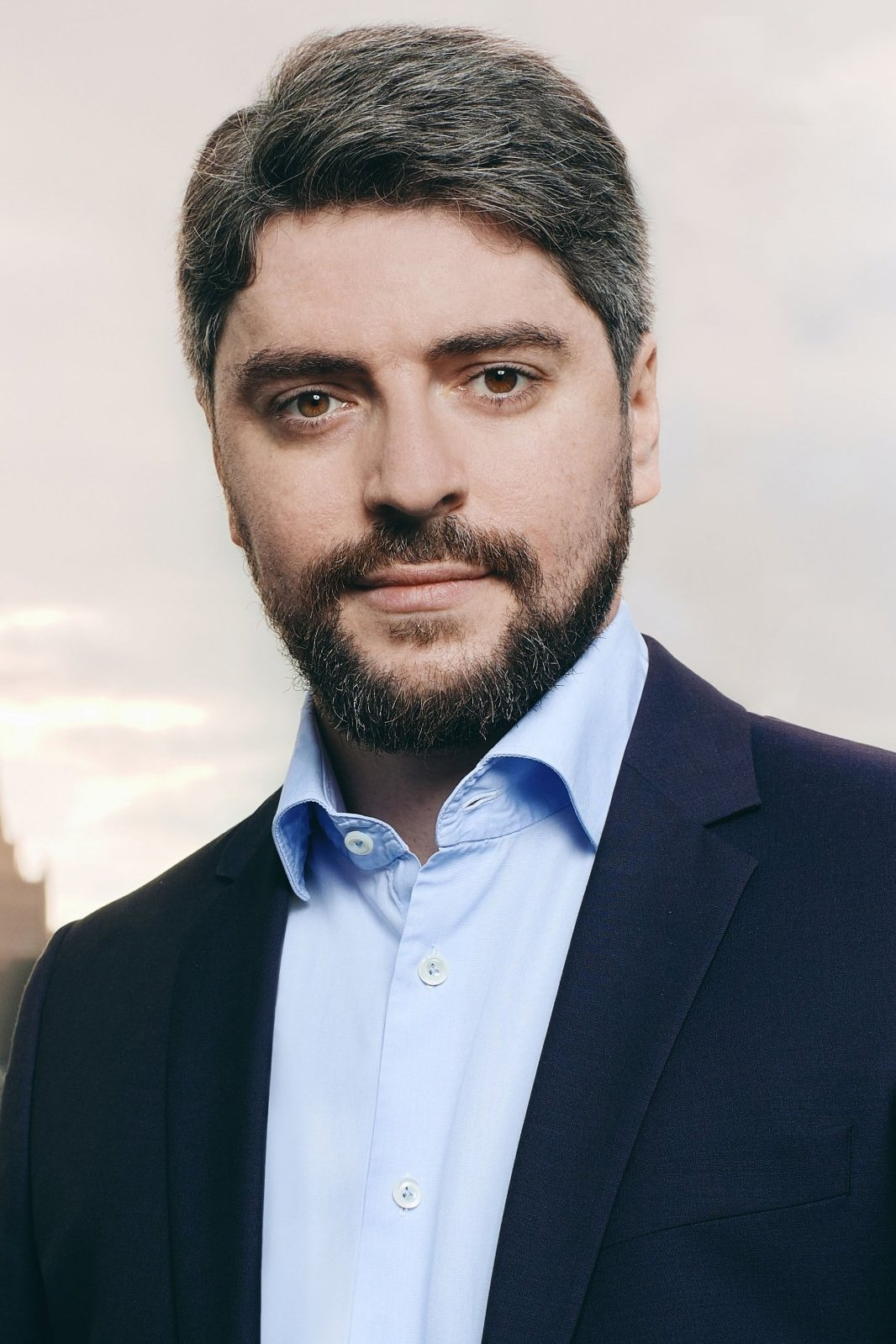

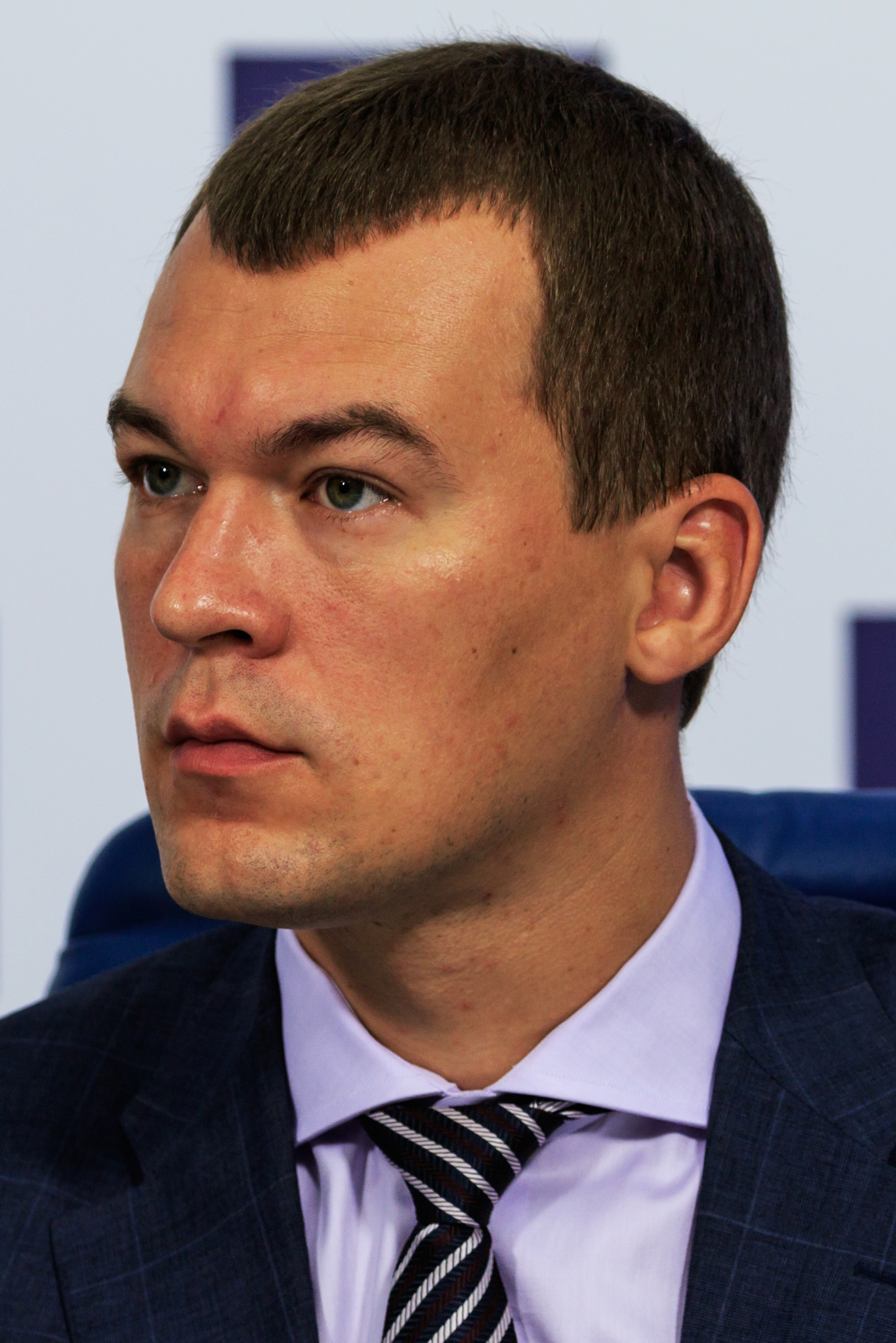
Candidate	Sergey Sobyanin	Vadim Kumin
Party	Independent	CPRF
Alliance	United Russia
Popular vote	1,582,762	256,717
Percentage	70.17%	11.38%
Candidate	Ilya Sviridov	Mikhail Degtyarev
Party	SR	LDPR
Popular vote	158,106	151,642
Percentage	7.01%	6.72%
Mayor before election
Sergey Sobyanin
Independent
Elected Mayor
Sergey Sobyanin
Independent

The 2018 Moscow mayoral election was held on 9 September 2018, on common election day. To be elected, a candidate had to get more than 50% of votes. If no one achieved 50%, a runoff would have been held 14 days later, with only the two most successful candidates from the first round participating in the second round.

Sergey Sobyanin, the incumbent Mayor of Moscow, was re-elected for a new term.

== Candidates ==
=== Nomination and registration of candidates ===
Candidates can be nominated both by political parties and as self-nomination.

In any case, candidates must pass the "municipal filter" (collection of signatures of municipal deputies). According to the decision of Moscow City Election Commission from 4 June 2018, the number of signatures of municipal deputies in support of a candidate must be in the range of from 110 to 115.

Candidates nominated by the self-nomination procedure, in addition to the signatures of municipal deputies, it is also necessary to collect signatures of voters. The number of signatures of voters should be in the range from 36,081 to 39,689.

=== Registered candidate ===
Initially, four candidates were registered to participate in the election, but on 23 July, the Moscow City Court ordered the City Election Commission to register one more candidate. Thus, five candidates were registered to participate in the election.

Candidate	Parties	Office
Mikhail Balakin (Note: Initially, Mikhail Balakin collected the required number of signatures of municipal deputies, but later three deputies withdrew their signatures, and registration was denied due to lack of signatures of municipal deputies, but on 23 July, the Moscow City Court declared the refusal illegal, since initially there were enough signatures and ordered to the City Election Commission to register Balakin as mayoral candidate.)	Union of Citizens	Member of the Moscow City Duma from 38th constituency
Mikhail Degtyarev	Liberal Democratic Party	Member of the State Duma
Vadim Kumin (Website)	Communist Party	Former Member of the State Duma
Ilya Sviridov (Website)	A Just Russia	Head of Tagansky District of Moscow
Sergey Sobyanin (Website)	Independent	Incumbent Mayor of Moscow

=== Other candidates ===
Candidates who fail to complete the registration
Candidate	Party	Office	Note
Ilya Bakov	Monarchist Party	General Director of "Royal Pond Group", son of Anton Bakov	Registration was denied because the candidate did not provide the necessary documents
Vladislav Buzarov	Independent	Unemployed	Registration was denied because the candidate did not provide the necessary documents
Mikhail Butrimov	Russian All-People's Union	Entrepreneur	Registration was denied because the candidate did not provide the necessary documents
Denis Ganich	National Course	Editor-in-chief of the newspaper "National Course"	Registration was denied because the candidate did not provide the necessary documents
Alexander Gorlov	Independent	Electrician of the MSTU "Stankin"	Registration was denied because the candidate did not provide the necessary documents
Dmitry Gudkov	Party of Changes	Leader of the Party of Changes	Registration was denied due to lack of signatures of municipal deputies
Natalia Dontsova	Independent	General Director of the Moscow Academy of professional Growth	Registration was denied because the candidate did not provide the necessary documents
Alexander Zakondyrin	Green Alliance	Leader of the Green Alliance party	Registration was denied because the candidate did not provide the necessary documents
Anton Krasovsky	Independent	Journalist	Registration was denied because the candidate did not provide the necessary documents
Viktor Kuvshinov	Independent	Pensioner	Registration is denied, as the nominated candidate provided only information about the three candidates for Senators
Alexander Milovankin	Independent	Leading engineer of LLC Gazprom Inform	Withdraw
Sergey Mitrokhin	Yabloko	Leader of the Moscow branch of the "Yabloko" party	Registration was denied because the candidate did not provide the necessary documents
Alexey Nazarov	Independent	President of the Constitutional Committee on Overcoming the Genocide of the Russian People	Registration was denied because the candidate did not provide the necessary documents
Dmitry Novikov	Independent	Director of LLC "Nitek"	Registration was denied because the candidate did not provide the necessary documents
Stanislav Polishchuk	Party of Social Reform	Leader of the Party of Social Reform	Withdraw
Sirazhdin Ramazanov	Social Democratic Party	Leader of the Social Democratic Party	Withdraw
Sergei Revin	The Greens	Leading specialist of the Yuri Gagarin Cosmonaut Training Center	The conference of the regional branch of the party decided to withdraw the candidacy
Ildar Ryazapov	Party of Veterans	Leader of the Party of Veterans	Registration was denied because the candidate did not provide the necessary documents
Alexander Romanov	Independent	Pensioner	Registration was denied because the candidate did not provide the necessary documents
Valery Ruchnov	Independent	Pensioner	Registration was denied because the candidate did not provide the necessary documents
Yaroslav Sidorov	Communists of Russia	First Secretary of the Moscow City Branch of the Communists of Russia	Registration was denied because the candidate did not provide the necessary documents
Maxim Slavin	Independent	Unemployed	Withdraw
German Sterligov	Independent	Businessman	Registration was denied because the candidate did not provide the necessary documents
Igor Suzdaltsev	Independent	General Director of "ICT Management"	Registration was denied because the candidate did not provide the necessary documents
Anton Tarasov	Independent	Engineer of LLC "Energotekhservis"	Registration was denied because the candidate did not provide the necessary documents
Sergey Troitsky	Independent	Rock musician, leader of the heavy metal band "Korrozia Metalla"	Registration was denied because the candidate did not provide the necessary documents
Ruslan Khaliullin	Independent	Director of the Charity Fund "Fund for Support of Children and Youth"	Registration was denied because the candidate did not provide the necessary documents
Ilya Yashin	Independent	Head of Krasnoselsky District of Moscow	Registration was denied because the candidate did not provide the necessary documents

== Opinion polls ==
Date	Poll source	Sobyanin	Kumin	Degtyarev	Sviridov	Balakin	Gudkov	Yashin	Other candidates	Undecided	Abstention
28-30 August 2018	WCIOM	69.4%	13.2%	7.8%	6.5%	1.4%	—	—	—	1.7%	
6-10 August 2018	WCIOM	65.5%	10.1%	11.1%	7.1%	4.3%	—	—	—	1.9%	
13-23 June 2018	Superjob	63%	2%	2%	2%	—	-	-	-	-	-
20 April-3 May 2018	Levada Center	34%	—	—	—	—	<1%	<1%	4%	27%	25%
8 September 2013	2013 election	51.4%	—	2.9%	—	—	—	—	44.2%	—	—

== Result ==
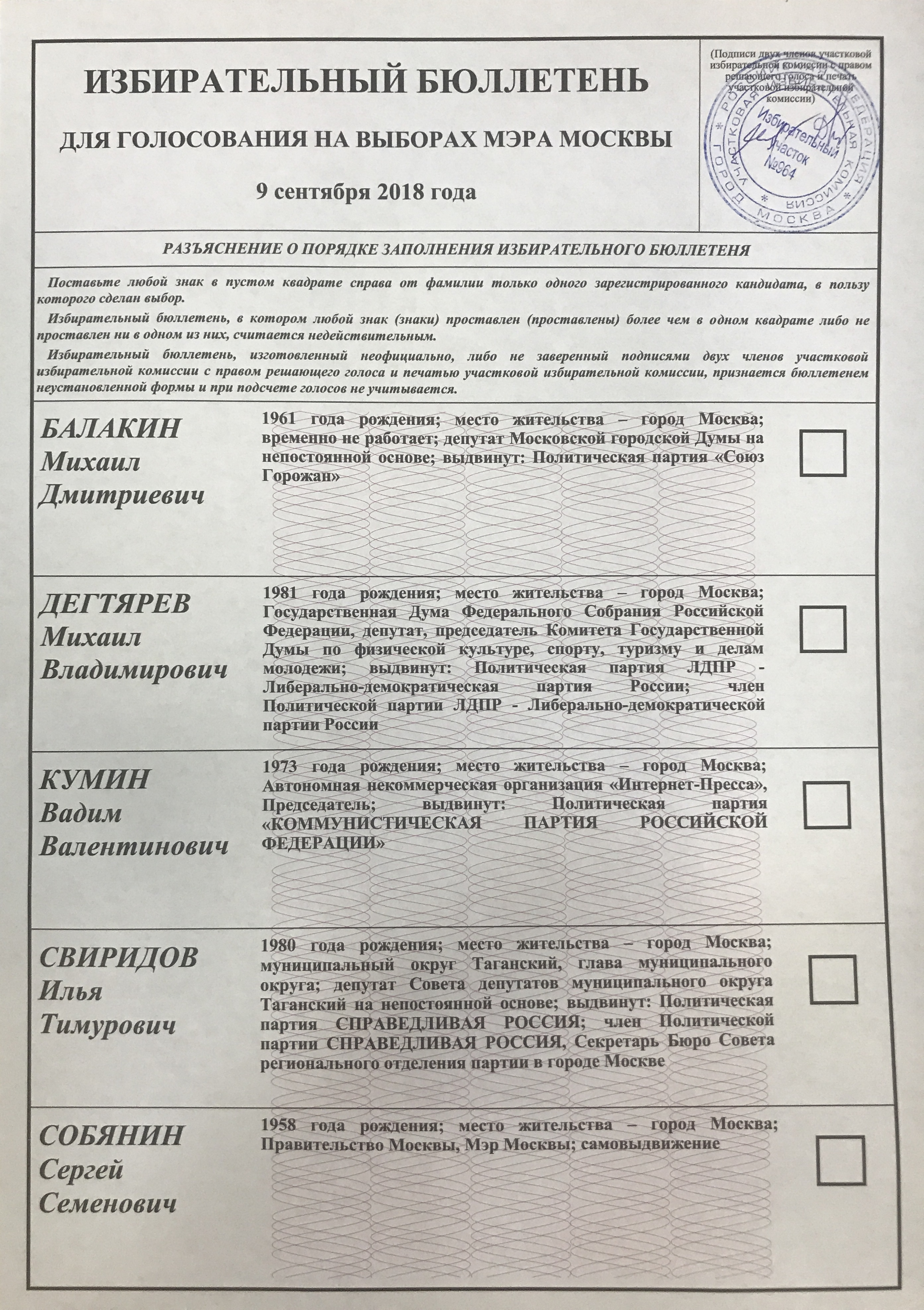
Ballot of the election

Summary of the 9 September 2018 Moscow mayoral election results
Candidate	Party		Votes	%
Sergey Sobyanin	Independent		1,582,762	70.17
Vadim Kumin	Communist Party	CPRF	256,717	11.38
Ilya Sviridov	A Just Russia	JR	158,106	7.01
Mikhail Degtyarev	Liberal Democratic Party	LDPR	151,642	6.72
Mikhail Balakin	Union of Citizens	UC	42,192	1.87
Total			2,191,419	100.00
Valid votes			2,191,419	97.15
Blank ballots			64,279	2.85
Turnout			2,255,698	30.91
Registered voters			7,296,529	
Official results published by the Moscow City Electoral Commission
