= Kumin =

Kumin is a surname. Notable people with the surname include:

- Maxine Kumin (1925–2014), American poet and author
- Sol Kumin (born 1975), American business leader, thoroughbred racehorse owner, and philanthropist
- Vadim Kumin (born 1973), Russian politician

== See also ==
- Cumin, a spice
