= Leonid Zyuganov =

Russian politician (born 1988)

- Леонид Зюганов
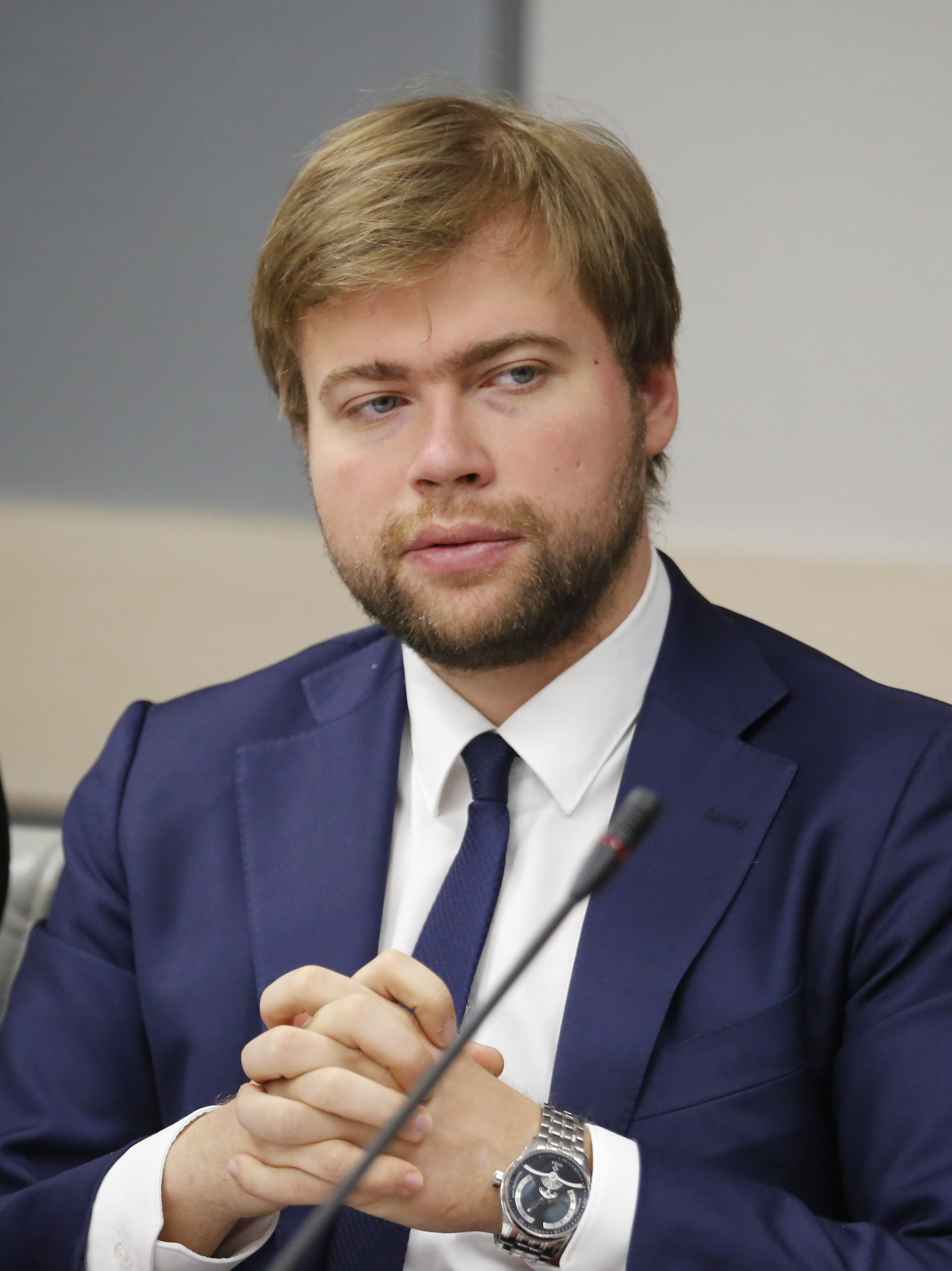
- Zyuganov in 2018

Member of the Moscow City Duma
- Incumbent
- Assumed office 18 September 2024
- Preceded by: Yevgeny Stupin
- Parliamentary group: Communist Party
- Constituency: №20
- In office 19 September 2019 – 18 September 2024
- Preceded by: Andrey Klychkov
- Succeeded by: Inna Svyatenko
- Parliamentary group: Communist Party
- Constituency: №21
- In office 24 September 2014 – 19 September 2019
- Preceded by: Lyudmila Stebenkova
- Succeeded by: Darya Besedina
- Parliamentary group: Communist Party
- Constituency: №8

Head of the Communist Party faction in the Moscow City Duma
- In office 21 November 2018 – 18 September 2019
- Deputy: Nikolay Zubrilin
- Preceded by: Nikolai Gubenko
- Succeeded by: Nikolay Zubrilin

Personal details
- Born: Leonid Andreyevich Zyuganov; 22 July 1988 (age 38) Moscow, Russian SFSR, Soviet Union
- Party: Communist Party of the Russian Federation
- Relatives: Gennady Zyuganov (grandfather)
- Education: Moscow State University (2010)
- Website: dep20.duma.mos.ru

Leonid Andreyevich Zyuganov (Russian: Леонид Андреевич Зюганов; born 22 July 1988) is a Russian politician from the Communist Party of the Russian Federation (CPRF) who has served as a member of the Moscow City Duma since 2014. Leonid Zyuganov is the eldest grandson of CPRF leader Gennady Zyuganov.

On 19 April 2023, he was nominated by the CPRF as a candidate for mayor of Moscow in the 2023 mayoral election.

== Biography ==
=== Early life and education ===
Leonid Zyuganov was born on 22 July 1988 in Moscow in the family of engineers Andrey Gennadievich Zyuganov and Tatyana Yuryevna Zyuganova, an engineer. Andrey Zyuganov's father is Gennady Zyuganov, the leader of the Communist Party of the Russian Federation since its foundation in 1993. Leonid is the eldest son of Andrey and Tatiana. The family has a younger son, Mikhail.

Leonid Zyuganov graduated from linguistic gymnasium No.1531. During his school years, he studied at the same time at a music school in the class of wind instruments, played in brass and jazz bands.

After graduating from high school, Leonid entered the Faculty of Sociology at Moscow State University. He began to cooperate with IT companies, and participated in the development of urban IT projects. In his third year, he headed a working group at the Department of Transport of the Government of Moscow to organize the work of a city taxi.

=== Political career ===
After graduating from the Faculty of Sociology of Moscow State University in 2010, Leonid Zyuganov began working as an assistant to State Duma Deputy and Chairman of the State Duma Committee on Industry Sergei Sobko.

From 2012 until his election to the Moscow City Duma in 2014, he worked as an assistant to the head of the CPRF faction in the Moscow City Duma Andrey Klychkov.

On 14 September 2014, Zyuganov was elected to the Moscow City Duma of the VI convocation. In the Moscow City Duma, he headed the Commission on Science and Industry, and is also a member of the commissions on health and public health, on physical culture, sports and youth policy.

From 2014 to 2019, Zyuganov was the youngest deputy of the Moscow City Duma.

From the fall of 2018 to 2019, Zyuganov headed the Communist Party faction in the Moscow City Duma, replacing Nikolai Gubenko.

Leonid Zyuganov was re-elected to the City Duma on 8 September 2019.

On 19 April 2023, the personnel commission under the presidium of the Central Committee of the CPRF led by Yury Afonin unanimously decided to nominate Zyuganov as a candidate for mayor of Moscow in the 2023 mayoral election. According to the head of the CPRF faction in the Moscow City Duma, Nikolay Zubrilin, the official nomination of a candidate for mayor of Moscow from the Communist Party was going to take place at a conference of the Moscow City Party Committee, which was tentatively scheduled for late May–early June 2023.

=== Incidents ===
In October 2022, Leonid Zyuganov was detained for not paying for gasoline at a gas station. Zyuganov himself explained that he paid for gasoline with a card in the terminal, after a beep he put it in his wallet. Allegedly, none of the employees told him that the payment did not go through. Later, the CPRF leader Gennady Zyuganov reacted to the incident, calling it a provocation.

== Political positions ==
According to Leonid, his grandfather never tried to impose his views on children and grandchildren. Nevertheless, Leonid himself became interested in politics while still at school. Rejecting the ideas of capitalism, "because he despised people who are chasing endless accumulations", Leonid began to study communism, realizing that socialist ideas were much closer to him.

Leonid Zyuganov does not accept the idea of a "democratic society". In an interview, he says: "...democracy is life according to the principle “man is a wolf to man”. And life in a society of socialism, a society of social justice, where the dogmas of collectivism prevail, is life according to the principle "man is brother to man".
