= Mikhail Balakin =

Russian businessman and politician

- Михаил Балакин
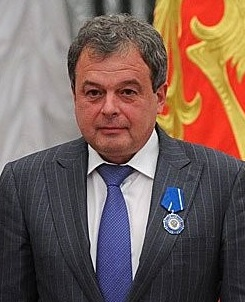
- Balakin in 2014
- Born: April 20, 1961 (age 64); Serpukhov, Soviet Union
- Education: Kuibyshev Moscow State University of Civil Engineering
- Occupation: Chairman of SU-155 Group of companies
- Spouse: Married
- Children: one daughter
- Awards: Order of Honour
- Website: SU-155

Mikhail Dmitrievich Balakin (Russian: Михаил Дмитриевич Балакин, born April 20, 1961) is a Russian billionaire businessman and politician. He is chairman of the SU-155 group of companies, as well as a Moscow politician, member of the Moscow City Duma from 38th constituency.

== Early life and education ==
Mikhail Balakin was born to a family of builders. He graduated the Kuibyshev Moscow State University of Civil Engineering with a degree in civil engineering and a concentration in heat and gas supply and ventilation.

== Career ==
He worked his way up from master to chief engineer over the following eight years. In 1990 he was named director of Construction Management No. 155 (SU-155).

He became co-owner and general director of SU-155 when the company became a publicly traded entity in 1993.

In 2000 he moved to work in the Moscow mayor’s office, where he was responsible for the construction of municipal projects and the renovation of substandard (dilapidated) housing. The Moscow International House of Music, the new stage for the Bolshoi Theatre, Square of Europe near the Kiyevsky railway station and the MGU Library were remodelled while he was working for the mayor of Moscow.

After deciding to leave the mayor’s office in 2005, he returned to the helm of SU-155, where he is the chairman.

=== Business ===
Balakin is the majority shareholder of the SU-155 Group of companies, comprising over 80 industrial and construction businesses. SU-155 revenue in 2013 rose by 35% to 114.2 billion roubles.

Balakin was one of the shareholders of NS Bank, but he sold his shares in the bank in April 2013.

He divested himself his assets in management companies that were originally part of the SU-155 Group in 2014 in order to concentrate on the core business of the Group.

== Status ==
Included in Forbes rating of richest Russian businessmen since 2005 (except for 2009), and in Forbes global rating since 2010:

- in 50th place of 100 richest businessmen in Russia for 2005, with assets worth $550 million;
- in 57th place of 100 richest Russian businessmen in 2006, with assets worth $800 million;
- in 53rd place of 100 richest Russian businessmen in 2007, with assets worth $1.2 billion;
- in 34th place of 100 richest Russian businessmen in 2008, with assets worth $4 billion;
- did not appear in list of 100 richest Russian businessmen in 2009;
- in 41st place of 100 richest Russian businessmen in 2010 and 616th place in Forbes global rating, with assets worth $1.6 billion;
- in 40th place of 200 richest Russian businessmen in 2011 and 512th place in Forbes global rating, with assets worth $2.3 billion;
- in 46th place of 200 richest Russian businessmen in 2012 and 683rd place in Forbes global rating, with assets worth $1.9 billion;
- in 57th place of 200 richest Russian businessmen in 2013 and 831st place in Forbes global rating,
- in 52nd place of 200 richest Russian businessmen in 2014, with assets worth $1.9 billion.

== Political career ==
Balakin has been a member of the Public Council of the Russian Ministry of Construction Industry, Housing and Utilities Sector since 2014.

In 2014, Balakin ran for the Moscow City Duma in 38th constituency. Initially, it was assumed that he would run as an independent candidate, but in the end he went to the polls from the Liberal Democratic Party. Balakin was elected to the City Duma gaining 46% of the vote.

In 2018, he ran for Mayor of Moscow. Balakin was nominated by the Union of Citizens party. To register, he had to pass the so-called "municipal filter", collect from 110 to 115 signatures of municipal deputies. Initially, he collected 112 signatures, this number was enough for registration, but then three deputies withdrew their signatures and the City Election Committee rejected the candidacy of Balakin citing a lack of signatures. On 23 July 2018, the Moscow City Court found the refusal of registration illegal and ordered to register Balakin as a mayoral candidate.

At the mayoral election Balakin ranked last, scoring 42,192 votes (1.87%).

== Awards ==
Awards have been presented at various times by the Russian Orthodox Church: the Order of Holy Prince Daniel of Moscow III class in 2005, the Order of Holy Father Serafim of Sarov III class in 2007, the Medal of Holy Prince George Vsevolodovich III class and the Order of Holy Father Serafim of Sarov II class in 2014. He was awarded the title “Builder Emeritus of the Russian Federation” in 2008. He was awarded the Order of Honour in 2014.

== Family ==
Balakin is married and has one daughter.

== See also ==
- SU-155
