= Sangadzhi Tarbaev =

Russian producer, television host, actor and politician

Sangadzhi Tarbaev MP
- Сангаджи Тарбаев
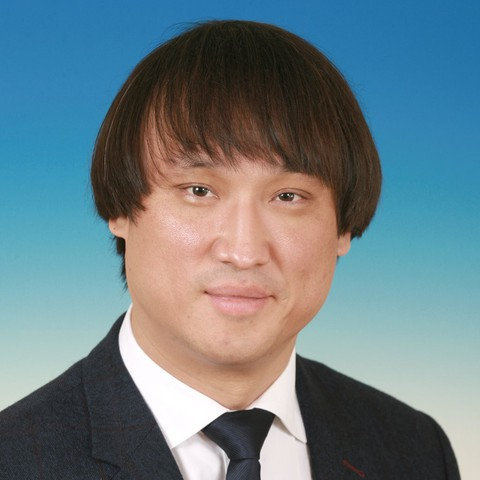

Chairman of the State Duma Russia committee on tourism and tourism infrastructure development
- Incumbent
- Assumed office 12 October 2021
- Preceded by: position established

Deputy of the State Duma Russia
- Incumbent
- Assumed office 19 September 2021
- Constituency: Party List

Deputy chairman of the Government of the Republic of Kalmykia
- In office 22 October 2019 – 25 November 2020
- Governor: Batu Hasikov
- Succeeded by: Gerenzala Muchkinova

Member of the Public Chamber of Russia
- In office 30 June 2014 – 20 March 2017

Personal details
- Born: 15 April 1982 (age 44) Elista, Kalmyk ASSR, Russian SFSR, Soviet Union
- Party: New People
- Spouse: Tatiana
- Children: 2 sons
- Education: Peoples' Friendship University
- Occupation: television host; television producer; politician
- Website: www.rudnkvn.ru/sangadzhi-tarbaev

Sangadzhi (Note: Sometimes transliterated as Sangadji.) Andreyevich Tarbaev (Russian: Сангаджи Андреевич Тарбаев, born 15 April 1982) is a Russian producer, television host, actor, and politician. Chairman of the State Duma Russia committee on tourism and tourism infrastructure development from 12 October 2021.

He was elected as a deputy to the State Duma in the 2021 Russian legislative election.

Deputy chairman of the Government of the Republic of Kalmykia (2019–2020). Member of the Public Chamber of Russia (2014–2017).

Prior to his election to the Duma, Tarbaev was a cofounder and producer at Yellow, Black and White, a cofounder of mixed martial arts promotion company Fight Nights Global (now AMC Fight Nights), and director-general of production company My Way Productions.

== Biography ==
Sangadji Tarbaev was born in Elista. He graduated from Peoples' Friendship University of Russia in 2005.

== Media ==
- In 2000 started career in KVN (Channel One Russia) as founder and member of comedy team "RUDN" that became champion of The Club in 2006.
- In 2007-2008 was one of the television host of TV program Vokrug sveta (channel Russia-1).
- Founder and general producer of "Yellow, Black and White" (2008–2012).
- Founder and producer of promotion company "Fight Nights Global".
- Founder and the general director of company "My Way Production".

== KVN ==
KVN is one of the largest youth movements in Russia, that shows in TV, Channel One Russia. Exist more than 55 years. Sangadji Tarbaev as founder and member of comic team RUDN that became the most title one team in the KVN. The team have all top awards.

== Social activity ==
In 2014 was elected in Civic Chamber of the Russian Federation.

=== Sanctions ===
He was sanctioned by the UK government in 2022 in relation to the Russo-Ukrainian War.

== Projects ==
- Daesh molodezh! (Russian: ДаЁшь МолодЁжь!)
- Odna za vseh (Russian: Одна за всех)
- The Uralskiye pelmeni show (Russian: Шоу "Уральские пельмени")
- Igrushki (Russian: Игрушки)
- Svetofor (Russian: Светофор)
- Odnazhdi v milicii (Russian: Однажды в милиции)
- Kuhnya (Russian: Кухня)
- Kak ya stal russkim (Russian: Как я стал русским)

== Awards ==
- Laureate of the TEFI award in the nomination "The producer of TV show" (Odna za vseh).

== See also ==
- Channel One Russia
- KVN
- Russia-1
- Vokrug sveta
- Yellow, Black and White
- Comedy team "RUDN"
