= Vadim Kumin =

Russian politician (born 1973)

Vadim Kumin MP
- Вадим Кумин
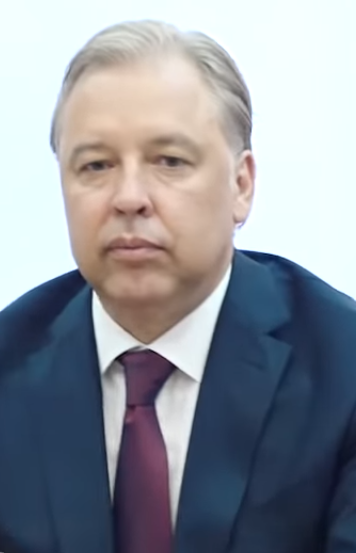
- Kumin in 2018

Member of the State Duma (Party List Seat)
- Incumbent
- Assumed office 21 December 2011

Personal details
- Born: 1 January 1973 (age 53) Chelyabinsk, RSFSR, USSR
- Party: Communist Party of the Russian Federation
- Education: Chelyabinsk State University; Academy of National Economy

Vadim Valentinovich Kumin (Russian: Вадим Валентинович Кумин; born 1 January 1973) is a Russian political figure and a deputy of the 6th, 7th, and 8th State Dumas.

At the beginning of the 1990s, Kumin engaged in entrepreneurship and founded his own business. In 1996, upon the invitation of the Minister of Energy, he moved to Moscow, where he held the position of the Executive Rector of the United Electric Power Complex Corporation. From 1998 to 2001, he was the Executive Director of the Energy Association. In 2000, he was appointed Deputy Head of the Department for Technical Re-equipment and Improvement of Energy Repair of RAO UES headed by Anatoly Chubais. On October 11, 2009, he was elected deputy of the Moscow City Duma of the 5th convocation. From 2011 to 2016, he was the deputy of the 6th State Duma. In Spring 2018, he ran in the 2018 Moscow mayoral election but lost to Sergey Sobyanin. In 2020 he received a vacant mandate to the 7th State Duma. Since September 2021, he has served as deputy of the 8th State Duma.

== Sanctions ==
He was sanctioned by Canada under the Special Economic Measures Act (S.C. 1992, c. 17) in relation to the Russian invasion of Ukraine for Grave Breach of International Peace and Security, and by the UK government in 2022 in relation to the Russo-Ukrainian War.
