= Dmitry Gusev =

Russian politician (born 1972)

Dmitry Gusev MP
- Дмитрий Гусев
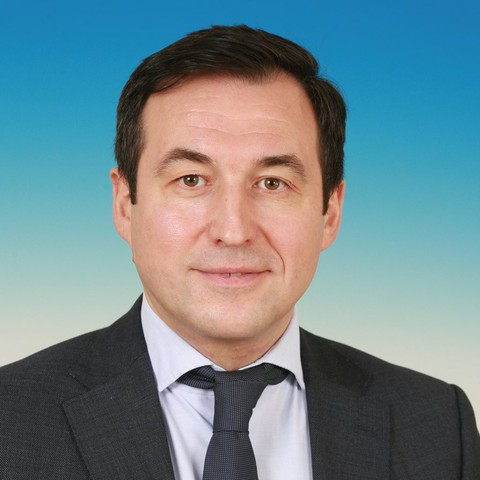

Member of the State Duma (Party List Seat)
- Incumbent
- Assumed office 12 October 2021

Personal details
- Born: 23 July 1972 (age 53) Sverdlovsk, RSFSR, USSR
- Party: A Just Russia — For Truth
- Education: Ural State University; Ural State Law Academy; RANEPA

Dmitry Gennadievich Gusev (Russian: Дмитрий Геннадьевич Гусев; born 23 July 1972, Yekaterinburg) is a Russian professional campaign manager and a deputy of the 8th State Duma.

After graduating from the Ural State University, Gusev, together with Oleg Matveychev, Rinat Khaseev, and Sergey Chernakov, founded the political consulting agency Bakster group, within the framework of which he organized over 200 election campaigns. From 1996 to 2001, he served as deputy of the City Duma of Yekaterinburg. In 2014, he started working at the government of Moscow. In 2015, Gusev became the advisor to the Chairman of the Moscow City Duma. In February 2021, he was appointed the head of the central apparatus of the party A Just Russia — For Truth. In September 2021, he was elected deputy of the 8th State Duma from the Krasnodar Krai constituency.

Gusev is considered to be one of the best Russian campaign managers.

== Sanctions ==
Gusev was sanctioned by the UK government in 2022 in relation to the Russo-Ukrainian War.
