= Khulimsunt =

Khulimsunt Хулимсунт
- Rural locality (posyolok)
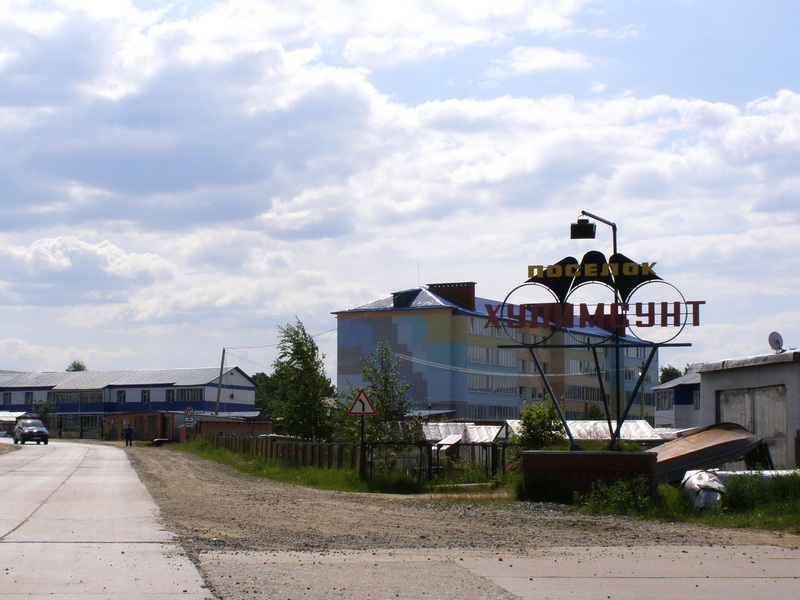

- Location within the Khanty-Mansi Autonomous Okrug
- Coordinates: 62°52′06″N 61°38′04″E
- Country: Russia
- Federal subject: Khanty-Mansi Autonomous Okrug
- District: Beryozovsky District
- Rural Settlement: Rural Settlement Khulimsunt
- Time zone: UTC+5 (YEKT)
- Website: hulimsunt.ru

Khulimsunt (translated from Mansi as "mouth of the Ide River") is a village in the Beryozovsky District, Khanty-Mansi Autonomous Okrug, Tyumen Oblast, Russia. It is the administrative center of the Khulimsunt rural settlement and is located on the Severnaya Sosva River.

== History ==
The Sosvinskoye Gas Compressor Station—the Linear Production Department of Main Gas Pipelines (LPU MG)—was founded on November 29, 1977 (the Punga-Vuktyl-Ukhta and Urengoy-Gryazovets gas pipelines, and the Northern Districts of the Tyumen Region-Torzhok gas pipelines), which marked the beginning of the village's construction. A Mansi village had previously existed here.

== Infrastructure ==
Modern Hulimsunt consists of the nearby village of Hulimsunt, primarily inhabited by Mansi, the Hulimsunt settlement (apartment buildings, the settlement's infrastructure), and the Sosva shift camp (workers' quarters, the Yugorskremstroygaz Trust's RSU-4 office, and a port). A gas compressor station is located 2 km from the settlement. There are no year-round roads. In winter, winter roads operate to Yugorsk, Igrim, and the settlement of Pripolyarny. Helicopter service operates (Sovetsky, Igrim, and Pripolyarny). There is a river cargo port. A secondary school, preschools, a club, a museum, a library, and a monument to pioneers are also available.

== Demographics ==
In the 1989 Soviet Union census the village had 72 residents. While the 2002 the village had 1478 residents. From 2010 the population started to decrease. In 2021 it had 1245 residents.
