= Sergey Sobyanin =

Mayor of Moscow since 2010

- Сергей Собянин
- Official portrait, 2018

Mayor of Moscow
- Incumbent
- Assumed office 21 October 2010
- Preceded by: Vladimir Resin (acting); Yury Luzhkov

Deputy Prime Minister of Russia - Head of the Government Executive Office
- In office 12 May 2008 – 21 October 2010
- Prime Minister: Vladimir Putin
- Preceded by: Sergey Naryshkin
- Succeeded by: Vyacheslav Volodin

Kremlin Chief of Staff
- In office 14 November 2005 – 12 May 2008
- President: Vladimir Putin; Dmitry Medvedev
- Preceded by: Dmitry Medvedev
- Succeeded by: Sergey Naryshkin

Governor of Tyumen Oblast
- In office 26 January 2001 – 14 November 2005
- Preceded by: Leonid Roketsky
- Succeeded by: Vladimir Yakushev

Personal details
- Born: 21 June 1958 (age 68) Nyaksimvol, Khantia-Mansia, Russian SFSR, Soviet Union (now Russia)
- Party: United Russia (from 2002)
- Other political affiliations: Communist Party of the Soviet Union (1982–1991)
- Spouse: Irina Sobyanina (div. 2014)
- Children: Anna Sobyanina; Olga Sobyanina
- Education: Kostroma Technological Institute; All-Union Correspondence Institute of Law
- Profession: Engineer, Lawyer
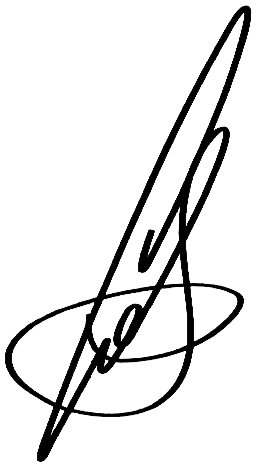
- Signature
- Website: sobyanin.ru (personal); mos.ru (official)
- Sergey Sobyanin's voice Speaking on Echo of Moscow; Recorded August 2013

Sergey Semyonovich Sobyanin (Russian: Серге́й Семёнович Собя́нин; born 21 June 1958) is a Russian politician, serving as the mayor of Moscow since 21 October 2010. Sobyanin previously served as the governor of Tyumen Oblast (2001–2005), Head of the presidential administration (2005–2008) and Deputy Prime Minister of Russia (2008–2010 in Vladimir Putin's Second Cabinet). He has the federal state civilian service rank of 1st class Active State Councillor of the Russian Federation.

Sobyanin is a member of the ruling United Russia political party, and is elected to its higher governing bodies, current member of presidium of Regional Council of the United Russia in Moscow and the head (political council secretary) of the party's Moscow branch from March 2011 to December 2012.

He is considered to be a close ally to Russian billionaire businessman Vladimir Bogdanov, Director General of Surgutneftegas.

As the mayor of Moscow, Sobyanin has gradually relaxed the massive construction projects of his predecessor Yury Luzhkov, for which he has won acclaim for the "most sane piece of city planning in years." As mayor, Sobyanin created Moscow Media, a holding company for a number of TV channels, radio stations, and newspapers, owned and controlled by the Moscow government. At the same time, Sobyanin was criticized for the banning of pride parades in the city, for which he was strongly condemned by LGBT groups.

== Early life and career ==
Sergey Sobyanin was born in a Mansi village of Nyaksimvol in the Khanty-Mansi Autonomous Okrug (then in the Russian SFSR of the Soviet Union).

In 1989, he got a second degree in jurisprudence (All-Union Correspondence Institute of Law). His PhD thesis was titled "Legal position of the autonomous okrugs as federal subjects of Russia". On 23 May 2007, at the Institute of Legislation and Comparative Jurisprudence at Government of Russia, defence of Sobyanin's higher doctoral thesis "RF subject in economical and social development of the state" were to take place on the basis of his monograph published shortly before the event. But the defence was cancelled due to an unknown reason. Examination of Dissernet of Sobyanin's doctoral thesis and the monograph of 2007 exposed high level of plagiarism.

== Political career ==
In 1991, he was elected mayor of Kogalym.

Since 1993, he has been the First Deputy of the Head of the Administration of the Khanty–Mansi Autonomous Okrug.

On 27 October 1996, he was re-elected as a delegate and a chairman of the Khanty–Mansi Duma.

On 12 July 2000 he was appointed the First Deputy of Plenipotentiary of President of Russia in the Urals Federal District.

On 14 January 2001 he was elected governor of Tyumen Oblast. During the campaign, oil tycoon Vladimir Bogdanov was its confidant.

He has been a member of the Supreme Council of the United Russia political party since 2004.

In 2005, Sergey Sobyanin sent a request to the president of Russia about a vote of confidence. That was done in case of the change of the governor assignment procedure. Vladimir Putin nominated him for election by the Duma of the Tyumen Oblast and he was finally reelected on 17 February 2005.

In November 2005, he was appointed a head of the Administration of the president of Russia.

Since 21 October 2010, he has been the mayor of Moscow.

== Mayor of Moscow ==
Solemn opening of the celebration of the 870th anniversary of Moscow, 9 September 2017

On 28 September 2010, Russian President Dmitry Medvedev dismissed Moscow Mayor Yuri Luzhkov "due to the loss of the confidence of the President of the Russian Federation."». On 9 October, Sobyanin was included in the list of four candidates for the post of mayor of Moscow proposed to the president by United Russia (other candidates are Lyudmila Shvetsova, Igor Levitin, Valery Shantsev). On 15 October, Medvedev nominated Sobyanin to the Moscow City Duma. On 21 October, deputies of the Moscow City Duma voted by secret ballot (32 parliamentarians voted "for", 2 — "against") Sobyanin was confirmed as mayor for the next five years. On the same day, the president dismissed him from the post of Deputy Prime Minister and head of the Government Staff.

On 7 November 2010, Dmitry Medvedev included Sobyanin in the Security Council of the Russian Federation as a member of the Council, at the same time excluding him from the permanent membership of the Council. Sobyanin became the first mayor of Moscow to join the Security Council. On 23 November, he was elected to the bureau of the Supreme Council of the United Russia Party.

Under Sobyanin, according to a decision taken by Russian president Medvedev, there was a sharp expansion of the territory of Moscow due to the annexation of part of the south-west of the Moscow region. Since 1 July 2012, the area of Moscow has increased 2.4 times, and the population has grown by 250 thousand.

From 22 February to 3 October 2013 — Member of the Presidium of the State Council of the Russian Federation.

On 5 June 2013, Russian president Vladimir Putin signed a decree on Sobyanin's resignation at his own request and his appointment as acting mayor until early elections on 8 September 2013. Sergei Sobyanin chose to run for early elections not from the United Russia party, but as an independent candidate, and therefore had to not only overcome the municipal filter (110 signatures of municipal deputies), but also collect signatures from 70,000 voters. On 8 September 2013, he was elected mayor, gaining 51.37% of the vote with a turnout of 32.03% (a total of 1,193,178 votes), Sobyanin's inauguration ceremony was held on 12 September.

In October 2017, Sergei Sobyanin announced plans to run in the Moscow mayoral election in September 2018. On 14 April 2018, ahead of the start of the mayoral campaign, Russian President Vladimir Putin noted at a meeting with Sobyanin that the mayor's team "generally works professionally," but there are still "chronic problems" in Moscow - traffic jams and migration.

On 9 September 2018, Sergei Sobyanin was re-elected for a third term, gaining 70.17% of the vote with a turnout of 30.89% (a total of 1,582,355 votes). The inauguration ceremony of the mayor took place on 18 September 2018.

On 11 September 2023, he was re-elected as mayor, gaining 76.39% or 2,499,114 votes. On 18 September 2023, he took the oath of office and officially assumed the post of mayor of Moscow.

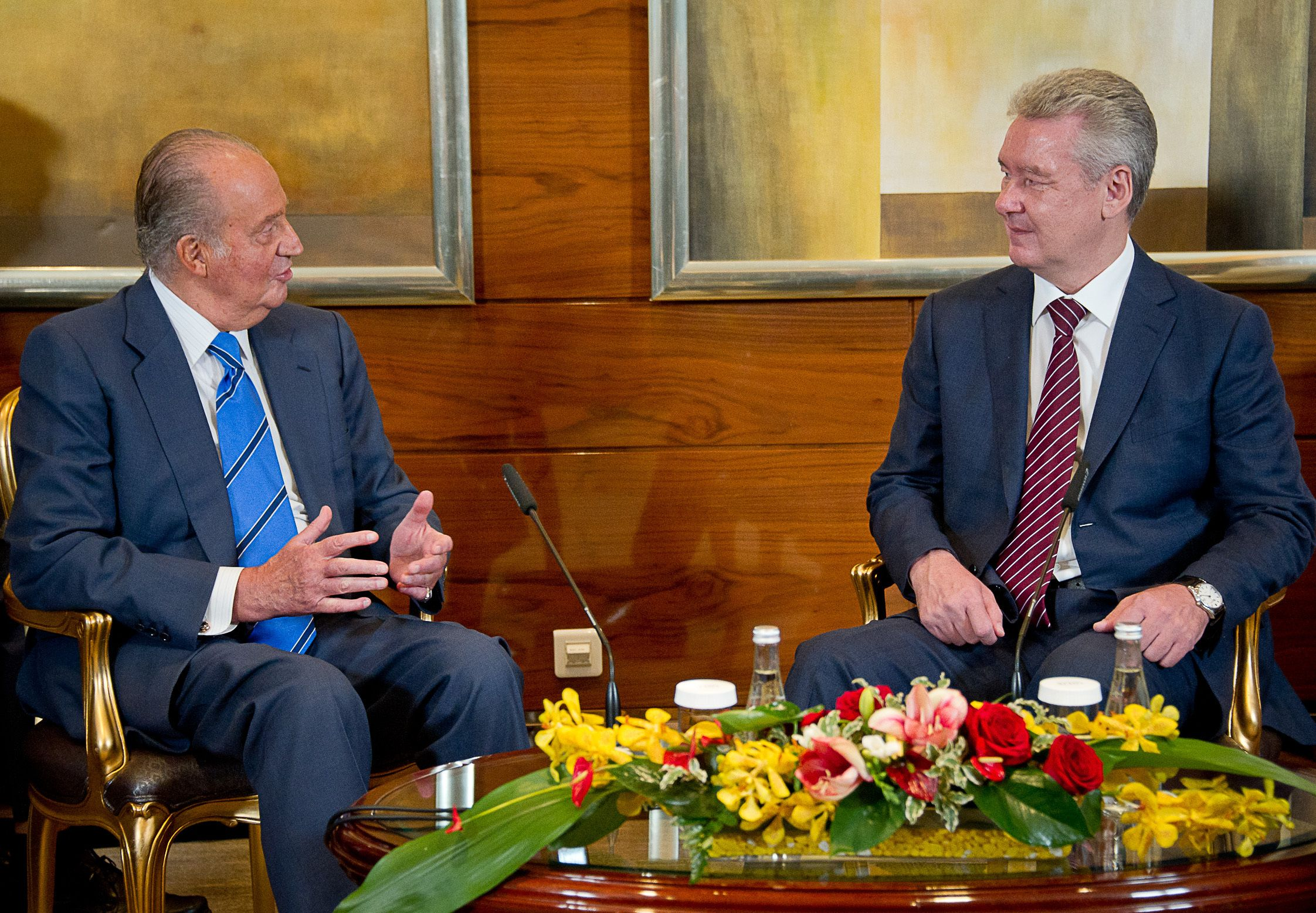
Sergei Sobyanin and Juan Carlos I. July 19, 2012

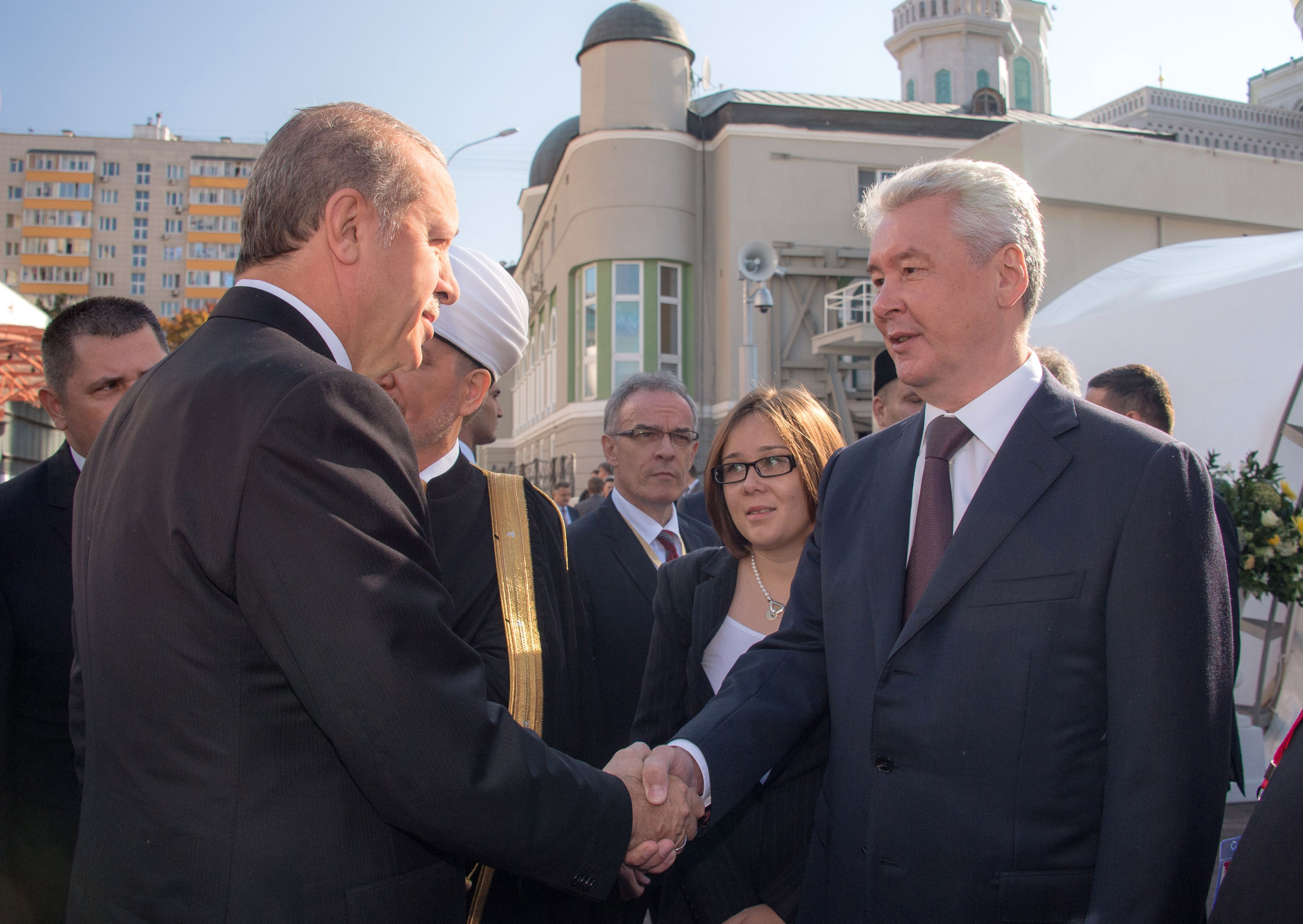
Sergei Sobyanin and Recep Tayyip Erdogan. September 23, 2015

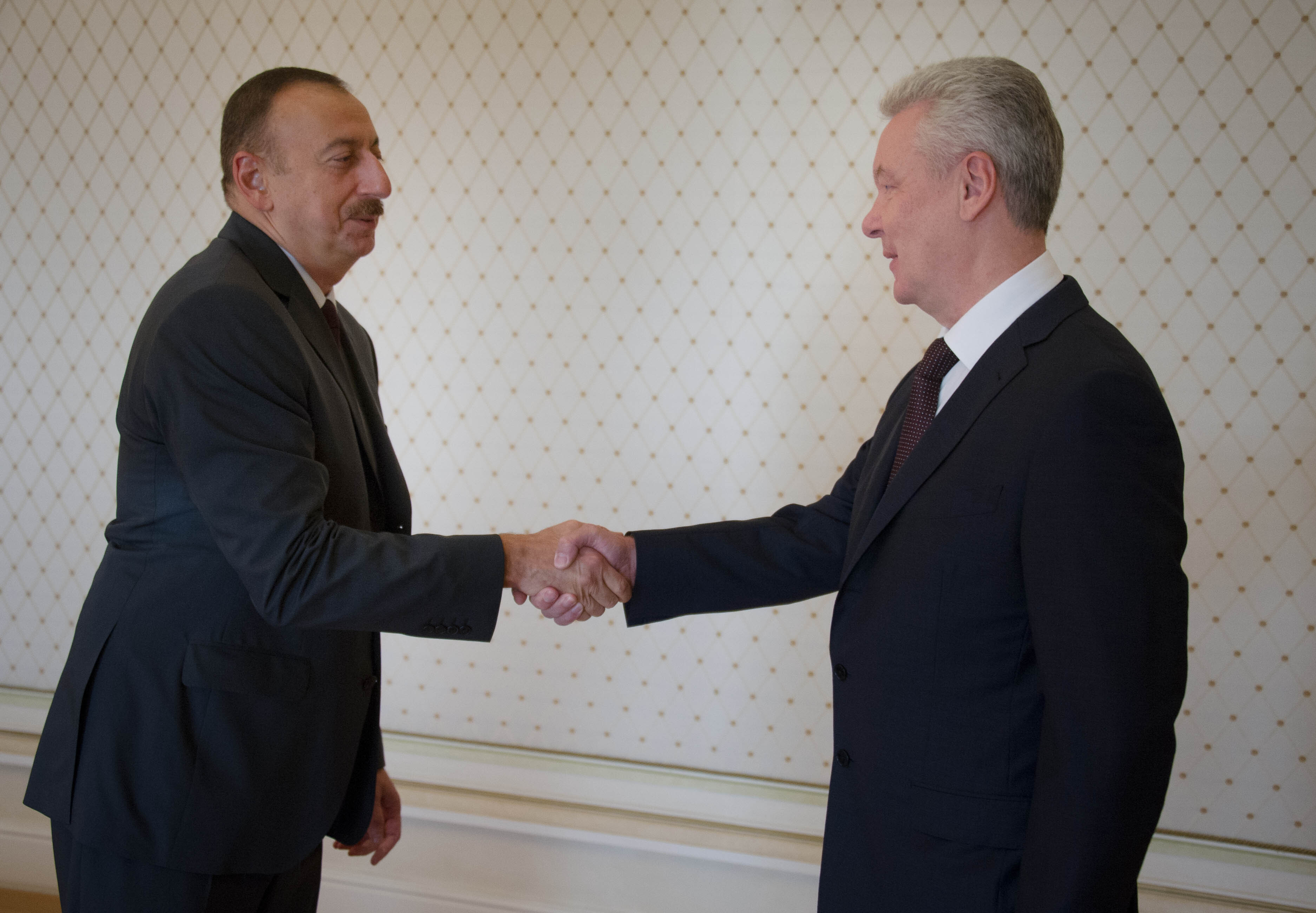
Sergei Sobyanin and Ilham Aliyev. September 25, 2014

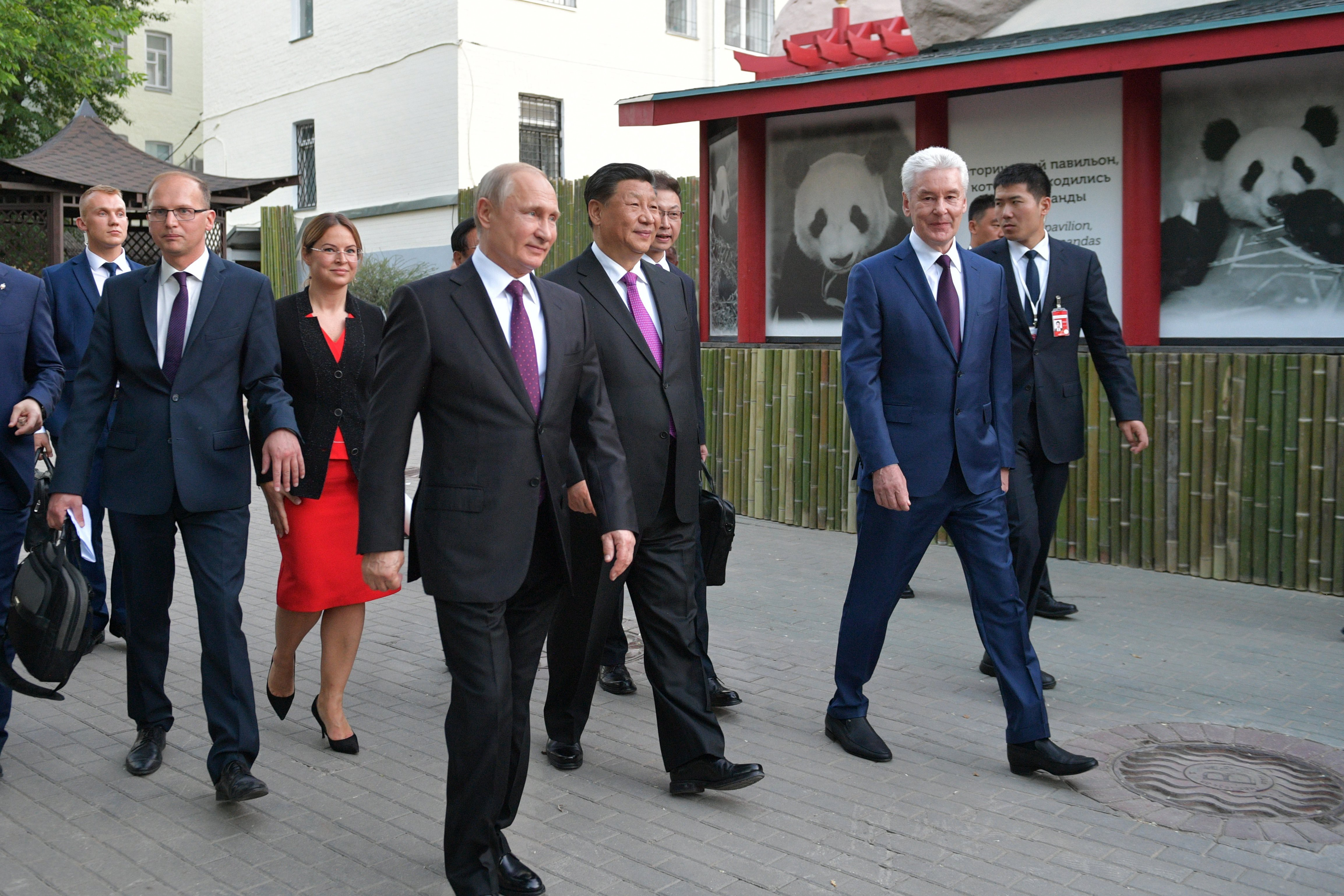
Sobyanin with Vladimir Putin and Xi Jinping in Moscow Zoo. June 5, 2019

Since 21 December 2020 — Member of the Presidium of the State Council of the Russian Federation.

=== Transport policy, public transport and road construction ===
Immediately after his appointment, Sobyanin described the crisis of the transport system as "the most visible imbalance in Moscow's development.". Uncontrolled motorization led to the fact that by 2011, 4 million cars were registered in Moscow., In 2013, the city ranked first in the world in terms of traffic jams., and with heavy snowfalls, traffic stops.

According to the Mayor's office and experts, the most effective problem—solving strategy is to reduce the number of cars entering the streets by 500,000. To do this, it was planned to increase the price of car ownership and at the same time expand the possibilities of public transport along with the renewal of the fleet.

Sergei Sobyanin advocated the introduction of parking fees in the center of Moscow. The first paid parking zone was launched in November 2013, and in December 2014 it expanded to the borders of the Third Ring Road and also appeared on 25 streets outside it. After the expansion of the paid parking zone in December 2016, it covers more than 1,200 streets and 47 districts of the city. The introduction and expansion of the paid parking zone has repeatedly provoked protests from citizens: in the fall of 2015, 12 protest rallies were held, and in December 2016, an action against parking policy was held on Pushkin Square. According to Yandex analysts, the expansion of the paid parking area to the borders of the Third Ring Road accelerated traffic by 7-10% between the Garden Ring and the TTK.

According to the navigator manufacturer TomTom, in 2015 Moscow moved to fifth place in the world in terms of traffic jams, and the traffic congestion index in Moscow decreased to 44% (in 2012 — first place and 57%, respectively). In 2017, Moscow was excluded from the top 10 cities with the busiest roads according to the TomTom rating. Time loss due to traffic jams decreased to 43 minutes per day in 2016 compared to 57 minutes per day in 2012. At the same time, the average speed of traffic increased from 45 km/h in 2010 to 51 km/h in 2016.

In 2011, Sergei Sobyanin signed a purchase order for 2011-2012 for over 2,100 buses of modifications 5292.21 and 5292.22, and since 2011 he has implemented a program for the introduction of high-speed bus routes along dedicated lanes for public urban transport. In 2012, Sobyanin announced plans to build 70 new stations on the Moscow Metro. The adopted program for the development of the Moscow Metro until 2020, worth about 1 trillion rubles, provides for the construction of 76 stations and more than 150 km of lines. Several new stations — Zhulebino, Novokosino, Kotelniki and Rumyantsevo — are located outside the MKAD. The program includes both the extension of existing lines and the construction of new ones, including the Bolshaya Koltsevaya metro line (the third interchange circuit).

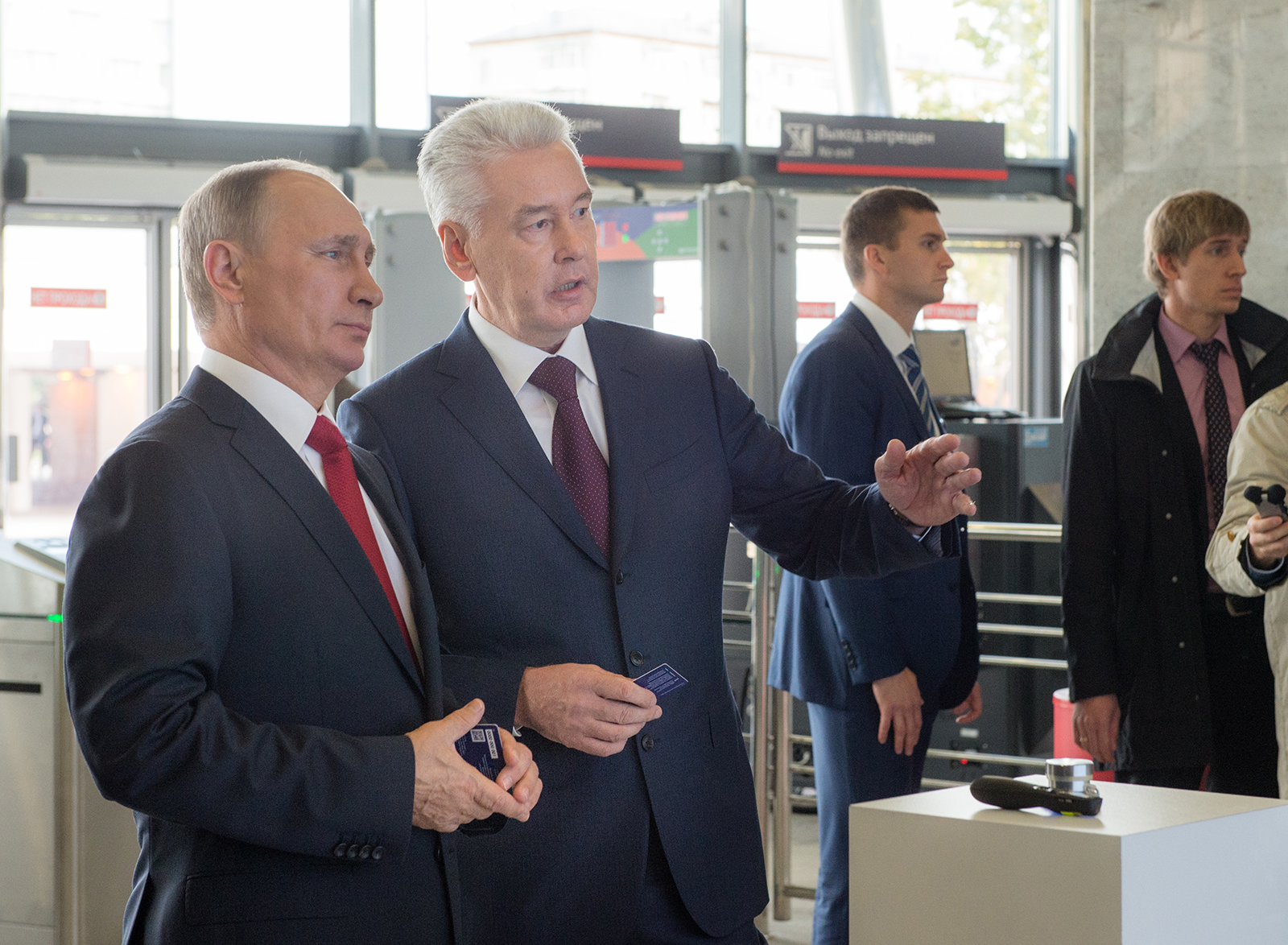
Sergei Sobyanin and Vladimir Putin at the opening of passenger traffic on the MCC, 10 September 2016

Sergei Sobyanin's rise to the post of mayor of Moscow was also marked by the removal of Dmitry Gaev from the post of head of the Moscow Metro State Unitary Enterprise, who headed the Moscow Metro from 1995 to 2011., and the appointment of Ivan Besedin to this post, Subsequently, he was also suspended after the train crash on the Arbatsko-Pokrovskaya line. Besedin himself stated that he left the post at his own request. Also, according to Vitaly Yefimov, the former head of the Ministry of Transport and deputy chairman of the State Duma, the resignation was premature.

On 10 September 2016, in the presence of Sergei Sobyanin and Vladimir Putin, electric train traffic was opened along the Moscow Central Ring (MK MZhD), which includes 31 stops with transfers to 10 metro lines and 9 radial railway lines. Urban electric train system The MCC is integrated with the Moscow Metro for fare payments and transfers, which creates a single space with the metro. By May 2017, more than 62 million passengers had used the MCC.

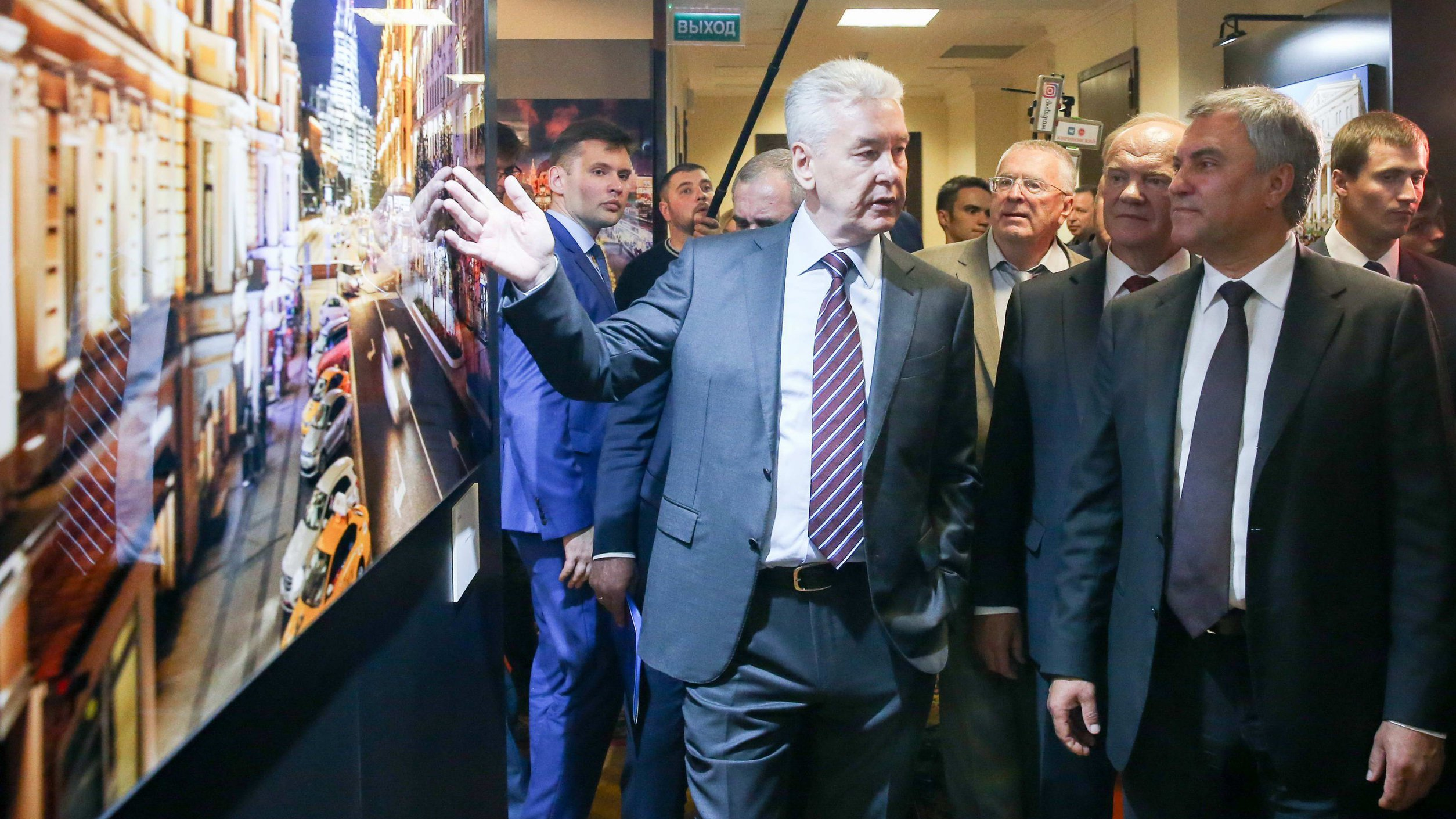
Sergey Sobyanin in State Duma

In October 2016, Magistral was launched in the central districts of the city, a program for optimizing the public transport route network and reorganizing routes of mainline, inter—district and social significance. Experts and citizens have criticized the policy of closing trolleybus routes since 2014. During the work on the My Street improvement program, the contact network was removed, and the routes themselves were shortened. With the launch of the Mainline, a number of trolleybus routes have been replaced by buses. The media reported on plans up to 2020 to further reduce trolleybus traffic. In January 2017, a rally for the preservation of the trolleybus network was held on Suvorovskaya Square, attended by about 900 people.

According to official data, 600 million (12%) more passengers used public transport in 2016 than in 2010; passenger traffic among economically active citizens increased by 63% compared to 2010.%. At the same time, the Moscow Department of Transport stated that ground transportation has improved its timetable compliance (94% accuracy in 2015 versus 76% in 2010).

With Sobyanin's arrival, road repairs have intensified in the capital. In 2011, the mayor announced the need to completely re-lay asphalt on roads every 3 years, while contractors under the terms of the contract give the city a three-year guarantee at their own expense. The first three-year repair cycle using new asphalt mixtures was carried out in 2011-2013 (before that, the coating was repaired every 7.5 years). In 2011-2015, 400 km of new roads were built in Moscow. In particular, the reconstruction of Varshavsky, Kashirsky, Mozhaisky, Leningradsky, Yaroslavsky highways, Balaklavsky Avenue and several interchanges on the MKAD was carried out. In December 2015, the ten-year construction of the Alabyan-Baltic tunnel was completed. From 2010 to 2015, the authorities completed the construction or reconstruction of 12 interchanges of the MKAD with outbound highways. At the same time, Sobyanin abandoned the project of building the Fourth Transport Ring, which began under Luzhkov. Instead, the Moscow Government has begun construction of two chord routes that will connect the outbound highways in the middle of the city and will have direct access to the MKAD. The northeastern chord will run from the Leningrad Highway understudy to the Veshnyaki-Lyubertsy interchange. The North-Western chord runs from Dmitrovskoye to Skolkovo Highway. It is expected that these highways will reduce the traffic load on the MKAD, TTK, outbound highways, as well as on the center of Moscow.

=== Urban planning policy ===
After Sobyanin was elected mayor in 2011, the Urban Planning Policy program was developed and approved by the city government in Moscow with the aim of "creating a favorable urban environment." A 4-year targeted investment program (AIP) and a 3-year program for the construction of off-budget facilities are formed annually.

The urban planning policy of Sergei Sobyanin's city hall began with steps aimed at protecting Moscow's historical buildings, but later he was repeatedly accused of lobbying the interests of the city's construction complex. The reason for a wide public discussion and complaints against the mayor's office was a large-scale renovation program initiated in 2017, designed to resettle areas of dilapidated panel housing over the decades.

Sobyanin, speaking in October 2015 about his work in the field of urban protection, said that "Moscow has become the undisputed leader in the restoration of architectural monuments in recent years," calling the preservation of cultural heritage one of the priorities of the mayor's office. According to him, 600 objects have been restored, 4,000 facades of historical buildings have been restored and 189 buildings that were previously planned to be demolished have been preserved. In particular, the procedure for recognizing historical buildings as architectural and cultural monuments has been simplified. At the same time, architectural experts note that the restoration of many buildings ends with the creation of a "new model".

At the same time, under Sobyanin, the practice of destroying historical buildings for new construction continued, for which the previous mayor of Moscow, Yuri Luzhkov, was heavily criticized. In 2013, the coordinator of the Arkhnadzor movement, Rustam Rakhmatullin, noted that with the arrival of Sobyanin's team, the attitude towards monument preservation had changed only at the declarative level: "Under Sobyanin, everything continues, but at a slower pace and in a somewhat paradoxical way, since declarations have changed." Rakhmatullin attributed a slight decrease in the level of construction activity in the center of Moscow to "long-term public demand", as well as the outflow of money due to the crisis. At the same time, he negatively noted the fact that Leonid Kazinets, the largest developer and owner of the Barclay Construction Corporation, was appointed Sobyanin's public adviser, known for proposing to demolish the old town by 70% and he blamed the mayor's office for the loss of, among other historical sites, the Shakhovsky—Glebov—Streshnev estate, the Volkonsky House, the Detsky Mir on Lubyanka Square, the Cathedral Mosque and the buildings of the Novo-Yekaterininskaya Hospital complex. The practice of demolishing valuable urban facilities for new construction continued in the following years: for example, in 2016, the Constructivist Taganskaya automatic telephone exchange was demolished., in May 2017— the Neklyudova house on Malaya Bronnaya.

Since October 2010, on Sobyanin's instructions, a reduction in the number of street trade facilities has begun. The Moscow Architecture approved standard stall designs, and the number of outlets was reduced from 14,000 to 9.9 thousand. By the beginning of 2015, there were about 7,000 kiosks in Moscow, of which about 2,000 were newspaper and ticket kiosks. In the spring of 2015, the city replaced 205 private pavilions with new ones owned by the city. The Mayor's Office has leased them to entrepreneurs and plans to replace the remaining 4,811 private kiosks with state-owned ones by mid-2017. In December 2015, the Moscow authorities decided to demolish 104 shopping pavilions near metro stations. The legal conflict allowed the city to recognize as self-construction the objects on city communications for which property rights were previously registered. The demolition of the facilities on the night of 9 February 2016 caused a wide public outcry. On the night of 29 August, the "second stage" of demolition of 107 more facilities started.

In 2011, as part of the urban improvement program, a large-scale project was initiated to replace asphalt pavement on sidewalks with tiles, following the example and standard of cities in developed countries of the West, the Far East and China. It was planned to allocate 4 billion rubles for this purpose in 2011 alone and replace 1.1 million m2 of asphalt pavement., However, the scale of the work turned out to be more modest, and in 2011-2012 2.5 billion rubles were spent for these purposes. It was assumed that the tiles would make the sidewalks more aesthetically pleasing and more durable, and maintenance would be more economical. The initiative was criticized by some members of the budget and finance Commission of the Moscow City Duma and residents of the city. In the objections of the deputies from the Communist Party of the Russian Federation, it was pointed out that this was far from a primary need, and budget billions could be used more profitably. Both the quality of the tiles themselves and the accuracy of their installation were criticized: the Left Front organization picketed the mayor's office, and the prefecture of the Central District refused to accept work on parts of the streets. In 2015, as part of the new My Street program, which involves the reconstruction of streets in accordance with modern standards, concrete tiles on sidewalks began to be replaced with granite slabs.

In 2014, after Sergei Sobyanin's address to Igor Shuvalov, The VDNKh exhibition complex became the property of Moscow and Sobyanin became the head of the staff for the restoration of VDNKh, Earlier it was reported that VDNH was transferred to the city at the request of some private investors, which was supported by the government. «A new mayor has arrived, my comrade Sergei Semyonovich Sobyanin. And the government decided to transfer the federal stake in VVC OJSC to the government of Moscow.», — Deputy Prime Minister Shuvalov did not hide it., noting the deplorable state of the exhibition. In the same year, at the suggestion of Sobyanin, the All—Russian Exhibition Center returned to its former name - VDNH. A decision was made to finance the reconstruction of VDNH, and from that moment on, the active reconstruction of the facility began. In 2015, the largest ice rink in Europe, designed for 5,000 people, was opened., and in March 2016, in the main pavilion of VDNH, Sobyanin unveiled Vuchetich's high relief "Glory to the Standard-Bearer of Peace, glory to the Soviet people!". In 2015, landscaping was completed around the Novodevichy Monastery and on the Frunzenskaya Embankment.

At the same time, individual projects, for example, the landscaping of Tverskaya Street for 300 million rubles, became the subject of criticism: Ilya Varlamov, co-founder of the Urban Projects Foundation, noted the weak architectural elaboration of the solution., and during the Moscow election campaign in 2013, politician Alexei Navalny directly accused the mayor's office of inefficient spending of funds and corruption schemes. In January 2017, Alexei Navalny, in a publication about the purchase of decorations for the streets of Moscow, accused Sobyanin and the Moscow Mayor's office of overestimating spending five times when purchasing Christmas decorations for the streets of the city. A few days later, Sobyanin proposed removing data on Moscow's public procurement from the federal public procurement portal, which was criticized by lawyers of the Anti-Corruption Foundation.

In December 2015, architectural critic Grigory Revzin noted that under Sobyanin, Moscow had for the first time a "clear urban planning policy," especially highlighting the cancellation of investment contracts for 24 million square meters inherited from the previous mayor's office. The novelty of the policy also lies in the fact that, in addition to overdue investments in the transport system and infrastructure reconstruction, the city government under Sobyanin turned its attention to public spaces. According to Revzin, on a symbolic level, "the car has been repressed, the pedestrian has become the main one," which has been translated into practice, in particular, in the reinterpreted Park of Culture and recreation on Krymsky Val, new embankments of the Moskva River, reconstructed streets in the city center, where the roadway was narrowed and granite sidewalks appeared.

At the same time, in February 2016, Grigory Revzin described the mass demolition of shopping pavilions near the metro in Moscow as the end of "Sobyanin urbanism" — urban planning policy since 2010, which combined the ideas of modernization and rejection of the shadow economy, in his opinion, the time of Yuri Luzhkov.: "To a certain extent, it resembles the existence of cities in feudal Europe — "Moscow's air was made free." The formula was as follows: instead of becoming European citizens, you are invited to become European citizens." However, in 2016, the money for peaceful modernization from above, "when everyone was compensated, agreed with everyone," became insufficient, which forced the Moscow authorities to go on an "act of intimidation" in the form of the night demolition of pavilions.

=== Social policy ===
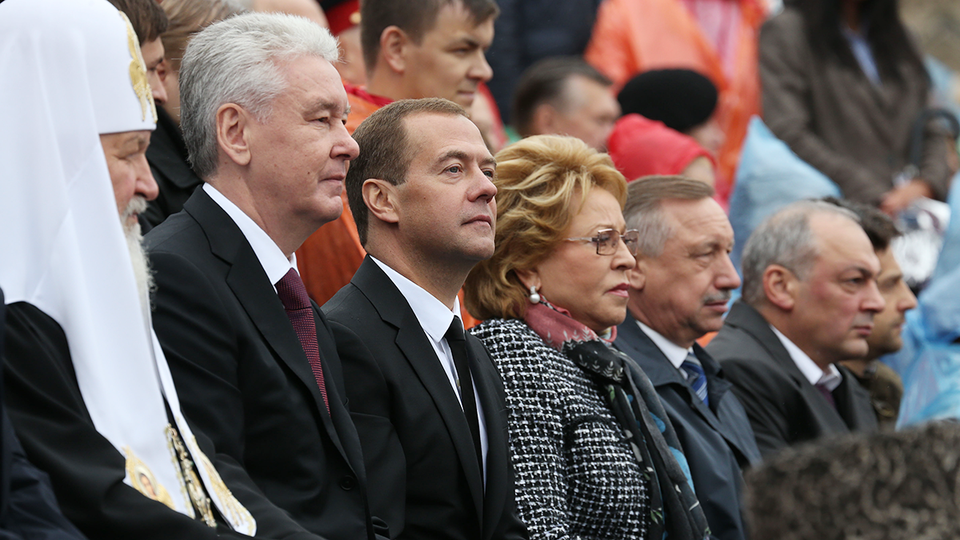
Dmitry Medvedev in Day of the Town 2015 (Moscow)

In May 2013, Sergei Sobyanin, in an interview with Moskovsky Novosti, stated that there was a danger of the formation of mono-national neighborhoods in Moscow, which would turn into a "ghetto" and a source of social instability. The words that "people who speak Russian poorly, who have a completely different culture, are better off living in their own country," caused a wide public discussion.

In August 2015, Sobyanin ordered stricter controls on illegal migrants, who may still number up to 2 million in Moscow (the Federal Migration Service claimed 1 million foreigners working in Moscow). The Federal Migration Service of Russia estimates that 35% of the migration flow falls on Moscow and the Moscow region. Earlier, a patent center was opened in the village of Sakharovo near Moscow to legalize migrant workers; the Moscow authorities expected that thanks to them the city budget would receive up to 12 billion additional fees. Sobyanin advised the Federal Migration Service (FMS) and the police to "actively clean up" the city from illegal immigrants who have not received a work patent.

In 2013, the Moscow government launched a public health reform, which resulted in the liquidation of 15 hospitals and several other medical institutions, as well as a massive reduction in doctors, nurses, and other medical staff. The reform caused a wide public outcry, and was also criticized by Russian president Vladimir Putin.

On 1 April 2015, a law was passed raising the minimum wage to 16.5 thousand rubles.

At the same time, an increase in rental fees (paid parking, an increase in property tax), according to experts, may indicate the desire of the Moscow authorities to launch the process of gentrification, which will displace low-margin businesses and low-income people from the city center.

=== Environmental policy ===
In September 2014, Sobyanin closed the Ecologist incinerator in the Nekrasovka area., In June 2015, he banned the construction of an incinerator on Vagonoremontnaya Street in SAO.

With the support of the Moscow Government and with the participation of the mayor, the Moscow Urban Forum has been held in the capital since 2011.

In August 2013, the Million Trees campaign was launched, which by November 2015 had planted more than 40,000 trees and 950,000 shrubs. It is planned that a total of 3.5 million trees and shrubs will be planted by 2020. In 2016, in connection with the massive felling of trees in Moscow, a number of activists and organizations repeatedly appealed to Sergei Sobyanin to stop the destruction of forest parks.

=== Administrative policy ===
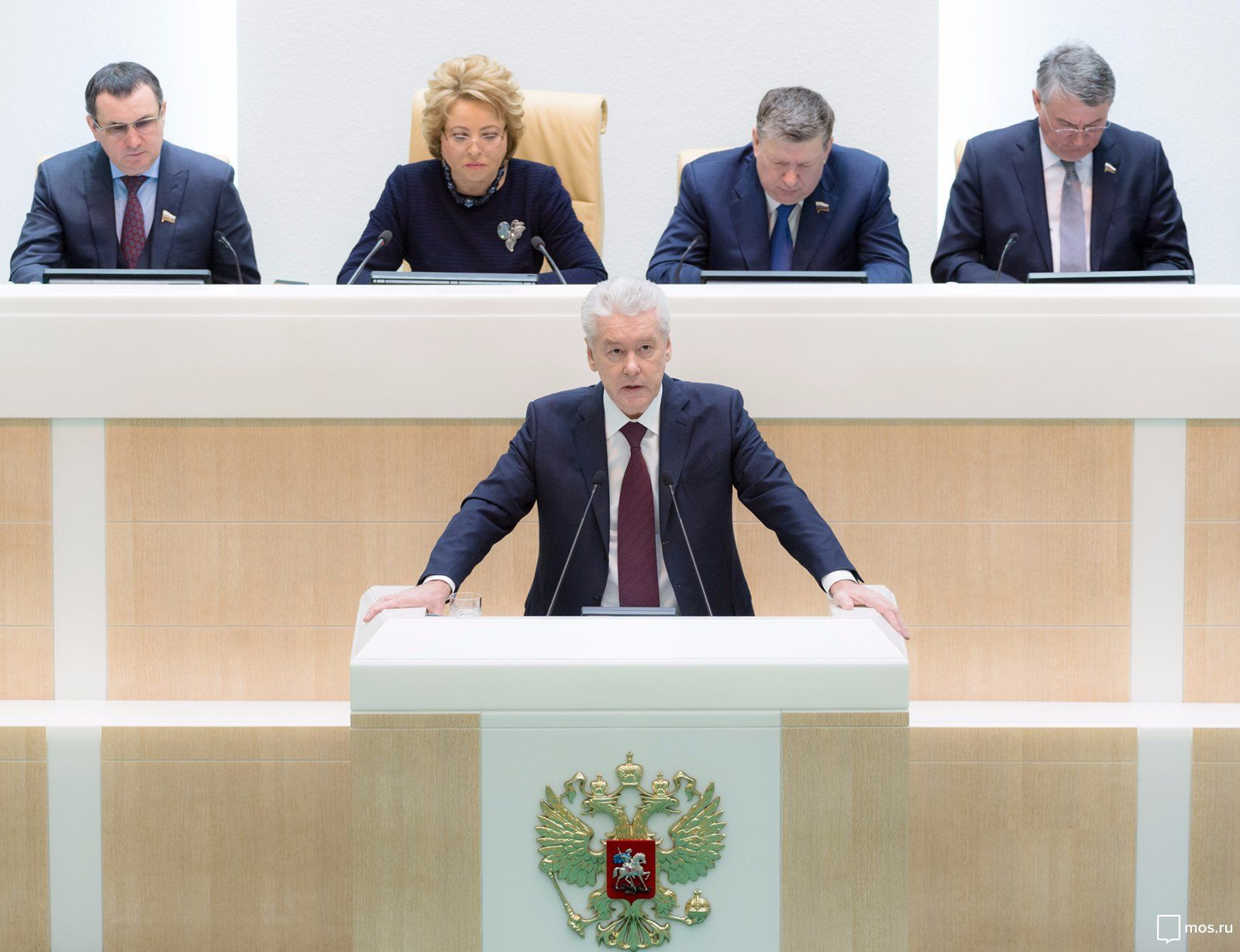
Sobyanin speaks at the plenary session of the Federation Council, 22 March 2017

Sobyanin's first discontent as mayor of Moscow was related to the election procedure, which critics saw as an "appointment from above.": The elections were held by secret ballot of deputies of the Moscow City Duma for candidates proposed by United Russia and approved by President Dmitry Medvedev. Later, due to the authoritarian approach to urban governance, which provides for minimal dialogue with Muscovites, and the accelerated implementation of projects, many initiatives of the Mayor's office were viewed with skepticism by the latter, despite the introduction of modern technologies and the involvement of reputable urbanists as consultants.

After assuming the post of mayor, Sobyanin gradually began to change the management team. Five years later, only one of the eight vice-mayors, Pyotr Biryukov, who oversees housing and communal services, has remained since the time of Mayor Yuri Luzhkov. Sobyanin's notable personnel decisions were the recruitment of Sergei Kapkov as head of the Department of Culture, Maxim Liksutov as head of the Department of Transport, and Marat Khusnullin to lead urban planning and construction in Moscow.

The Mayor's Office has consistently built a management vertical. At first, the range of issues for which 146 municipalities of the city are responsible was curtailed: they were given the right to coordinate plans for major repairs of houses, landscaping of courtyards and parks, schemes for the placement of small retail facilities and construction sites of local importance, but decisions on the main issues are made at the prefectural level. Later, the government began to curtail the rights of prefectures in favor of the city administration.

In March 2015, Sobyanin announced a reduction in the staff of Moscow civil servants by 30% or 3,000 people. At the same time, by his decree, he cut his salary and payments to members of the metropolitan government.

Sergei Sobyanin's administrative policy was criticized by municipal deputy Konstantin Jankauskas.

February 2016 — the so-called "Night of the Long Buckets".

== Public perception ==
According to an independent poll of 2011, most Muscovites believe that since coming to power, Sobyanin's leadership has not differed from that of Yury Luzhkov.

== Family and personal life ==
Sobyanin enjoys hunting, fishing, literature and classical music, and plays tennis.

Sobyanin has two older sisters. Lyudmila moved from Berezovo to Kostroma in the early 1970s, where she got married; Natalia lived in Kogalym in the late 1980s and worked in the construction department.

He was married for 28 years to Irina Iosifovna Sobyanina (nee Rubinchik). Irina Sobyanina was born on 19 November 1961 in Tyumen (her father, Joseph Davidovich Rubinchik (born 1937), was a well-known power engineer in the city), and graduated with a degree in civil engineering. After graduation, she was assigned to Kogalym, where she met Sobyanin and married him on 23 February 1986. In 2004-2005, she taught the art of collage and floristry at the P. I. Podaruyev Tyumen Center for Child Development. She lives in Moscow and worked as a kindergarten teacher in 2011. On 21 February 2014, the couple's divorce was announced. Irina Sobyanina's cousin is the former Minister of Fuel and Energy of Russia Alexander Gavrin.

Sergei Sobyanin has two daughters from his marriage to Irina Iosifovna:

- Sobyanina Anna Sergeevna (born 2 October 1986). She studied at Gymnasium No. 1 and the children's art school of Khanty-Mansiysk. In 2003, she became a full-time student at the Faculty of Monumental Art of the St. Petersburg State Stieglitz Academy of Art and Industry. She defended her diploma in 2009. She lives in St. Petersburg and is married to Alexander Ershov.
- Olga Sergeevna Sobyanina (born 3 June 1997). Studied at a Moscow school.

== Sanctions ==
In response to the 2022 Russian invasion of Ukraine, on 6 April 2022 the Office of Foreign Assets Control of the United States Department of the Treasury added Sobyanin to its list of persons sanctioned pursuant to Executive Order 14024, followed by the United Kingdom, and European Union.

== Awards ==
- Order of Merit for the Fatherland, 1st class (June 21, 2023) — for his great contribution to the socio-economic development of the city of Moscow
- Order of Honor (November 3, 2003) — for his great contribution to the strengthening of Russian statehood and many years of diligent work
- Medal of the Order of Merit for the Fatherland, II degree (March 3, 1999) — for high achievements in work and merits in strengthening friendship and cooperation between peoples
- Stolypin Medal, first class (21 October 2010)
- Rosgvardiya Medal "For Military Cooperation" (27 March 2023)
- Order of the Republic of Tyva (Republic of Tyva, Russia, 8 July 2020)
- Order of Salavat Yulaev (Bashkortostan, 2 July 2023)
- Order of Labor Glory, 1st degree (Lugansk People's Republic, 2025)
- Officer of the Order of Agricultural Merit (France, 2003)
- The distinction of "Nominal firearms" (Ukraine, 18 December 2010)
- Order of St. Sergius of Radonezh, II degree (Russian Orthodox Church, 2024)
- Order of the Holy Prince Daniel of Moscow, first Class (ROC, May 25, 2017) — for assistance in the construction of a new cathedral in the Sretensky Monastery
- Order of the Holy Prince Daniel of Moscow, II degree (ROC, June 19, 2014) — in consideration of the work on the development of church-state relations in the city of Moscow
- Order of the Holy Prince Daniel of Moscow, III degree (ROC, June 21, 2018) — in recognition of his work and in connection with the significant date
- Order of the Holy Equal-to-the-Apostles Prince Vladimir, 1st degree (UOC-MP, 2011)
- Honorary Medal of the Ministry of Education of Russia
- The title of "Person of the Year — 2001" with the wording "for conscientious service in the public field for the benefit of the prosperity of the Tyumen region".
- The title of "Honorary Citizen of the Tyumen region" (November 22, 2005) — for many years of conscientious work aimed at the development of the Tyumen region and the achievement of economic, social and cultural well-being of the population of the Tyumen region
- Winner of the "Man of the Year of Russia-2003" award in the "Politician of the Year" nomination
- The title of "Person of the Year-2013" (27 November 2013)
- Winner of the Darin National Award of the Russian Academy of Business and Entrepreneurship (December 2002).
- The highest legal award "Lawyer of the Year" in the nomination "For the protection of social and labor rights of citizens" (2023)
  - Order of St. Sergius of Radonezh, II degree (10 December 2024).

== Notes ==
Political offices
Preceded by Dmitry Medvedev	Chief of the Russian Presidential Administration; 2005–2008	Succeeded by Sergey Naryshkin
Preceded by Vladimir Resin; Acting	Mayor of Moscow; 2010–present	Incumbent
