= List of heads of Moscow government =

== Tsardom of Russia and Russian Empire ==
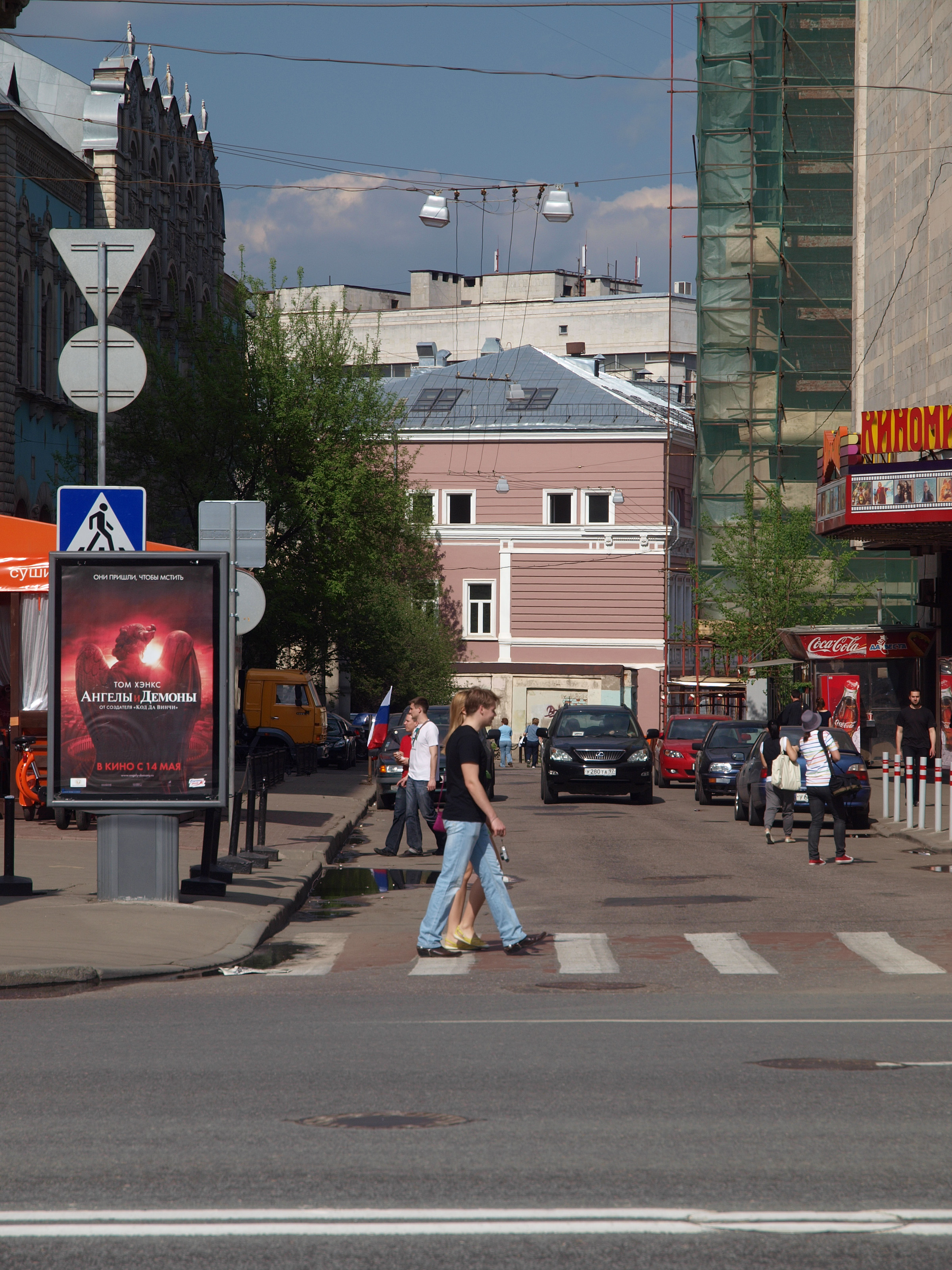
The House of Moscow Civil Governor (on the left, address: Tverskaya Street, house 20, building 1) was built in 1770s.

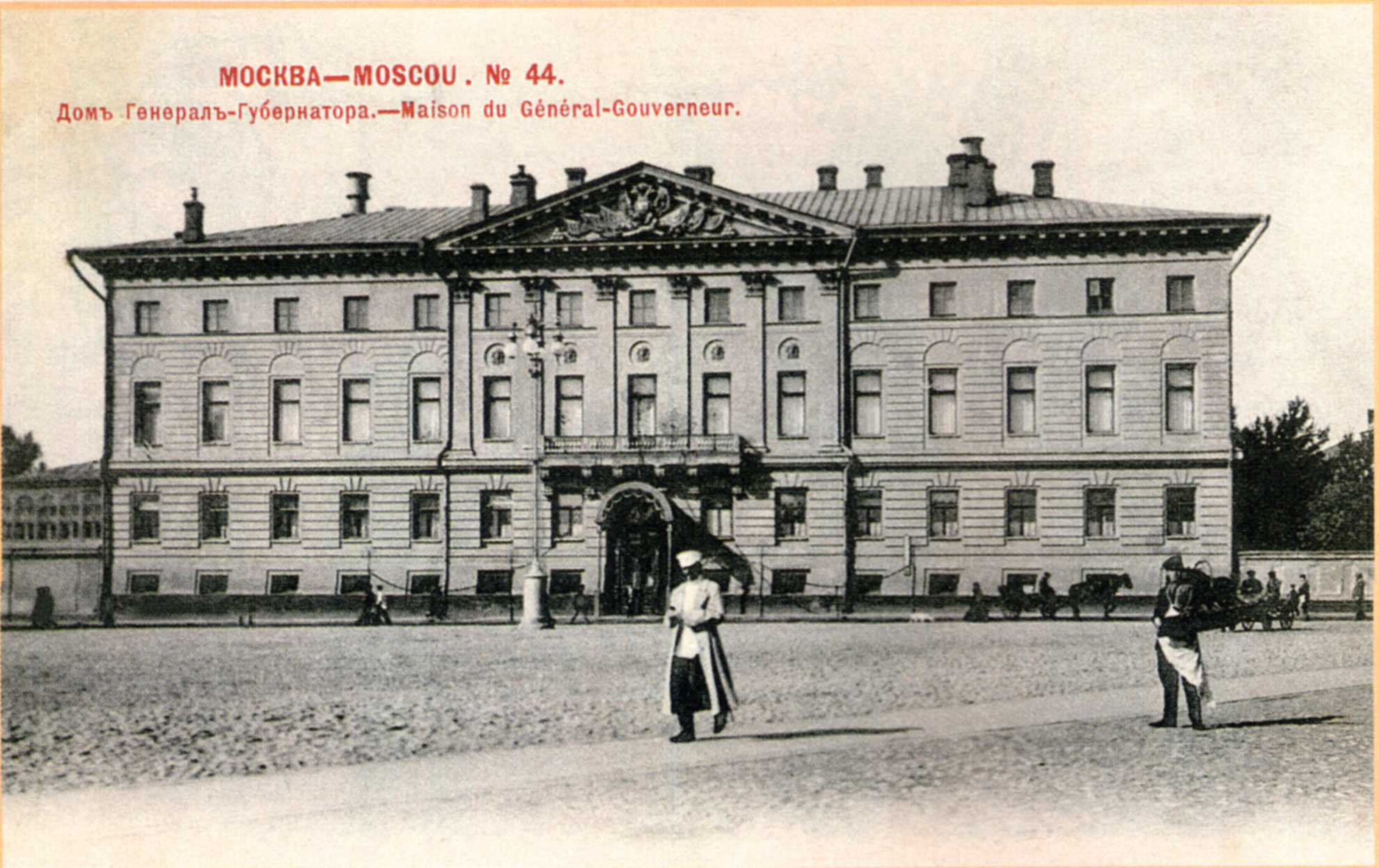
Moscow Governor General House (now Residence of the Mayor of Moscow, aka "Tverskaya Street, 13" and Mossovet building) was built in 1778–1782.

Governorates of the Russian Empire was created by the edict (ukase) of Peter the Great on 18 December 1708 "On the establishment of the gubernias and cities assigned to them", which divided Russia into eight guberniyas. Peter appointed Governors-General only in the St. Petersburg and Azov governorates. The heads of the other six governorates were named by Peter as governors. Initially, the titles Governor-General (генерал-губернатор - general-gubernator) and Governor (губенатор - gubernator) were no different. The title was only an honorific title.

Tikhon Streshnev was the first governor of Moscow in 1709–1711. In 1712–1714, the capital of the Tsardom of Russia was moved to St. Petersburg.

The higher chief (главный начальник - glavny nachal'nik) was the head of the Moscow governorate since 1727. It was appointed by the Emperor. From time to time, the Emperor sometimes voluntarily called this position as "Governor-General" or "commander-in-chief".

In 1780s, older Moscow governorate was disestablished. The territory of former Moscow province becomes the new subdivision with the name "Moscow governorate". On 5 October 1781, Catherine II signed ukaz "On the Establishing of Moscow governorate". The title of the head was defined in this ukaz.

On 30 October 1816, the title "chief" (начальник - nachal'nik) was renamed "military governor-general" (военнный генерал-губернатор - voyenny general-gubernator). Vladimir Dolgorukov was appointed governor-general of the Moscow Military District for the first time without the word "military" in 1865.

During the existence of both the Moscow Governorate and the Moscow Governorate-General (with Moscow Governorate-General consisted only of the Moscow Governorate) as two administrative units in the same time, there were simultaneously two posts of heads of Moscow in the same time. The responsibilities between the Military Governor and the Civil Governor were divided in a very complex way.

In 1905, the Moscow gradonachalnik and Moscow Civil governor were subordinated to the Moscow Governor-General. Therefore, there were three offices of heads of Moscow in the same time.

=== List ===
- Tikhon Streshnev (1709–1711)
- Vasili Yershov (1711–1712)
- Mikhail Romodanovsky (1712–1713)
- Alexei Petrovich Saltykov (1713–1716)
- Kirill Alexeyevich Naryshkin (1716–1719)
- Ivan Voeikov (1719–1726)
- Pyotr Velyaminov-Zernov (1726–1738)
- Ivan Romodanovsky (1727–1729)
- Alexei Plescheyev (February–May 1727, 1729–1730)
- Vasily Saltykov (March–October 1730)
- Grigory Chernyshyov (1731–1735)
- Ivan Baryatinsky (1735–1736)
- Fyodor Nikolayevich Balk (1734–1738)
- Boris Yusupov (1738–1740, 1740–1741)
- Ivan Trubetskoy (May–December 1739)
- Karl Biron (March–November 1740)
- Vladimir Saltykov (1741–1751)
- Alexander Buturlin (1742–1744, 1762–1763)
- Vasily Levashov (1744–1751)
- Semyon Ushakov (1751–1755)
- Sergei Alexeyevich Golitsyn (1753–1756)
- Nikolai Zherebtsov (1755–1762, 1762–1764)
- Pyotr Cherkassky (1760–1762)
- Pyotr Saltykov (1763–1771)
- Grigory Grigorievich Orlov (September–November 1771)
- Mikhail Volkonsky (1771–1780)
- Vasily Dolgorukov-Krymsky (1780–1782)
- Zakhar Chernyshyov (1782–1784)
- Jacob Bruce (1784–1786)
- Pyotr Dmitrievich Yeropkin (1786–1790)
- Alexander Prozorovsky (1790–1795)
- Mikhail Izmailov (1795–1797)
- Yuri Vladimirovich Dolgorukov (May–November 1797)
- Ivan Saltykov (1797–1804)
- Alexander Bekleshov (1804–1806)
- Timofei Tutolmin (1806–1809)
- Ivan Gudovich (1809–1812)
- Fyodor Rostopchin (1812–1814)
- Alexander Tormasov (1814–1819)
- Dmitry Golitsyn (1820–1844)
- Alexei Grigorievich Scherbatov (1844–1848)
- Arseniy Zakrevsky (1848–1859)
- Sergei Stroganov (April–September 1859)
- Pavel Tuchkov (1859–1864)
- Mikhail Ofrosimov (1864–1865)
- Vladimir Andreyevich Dolgorukov (1865–1891)
- Grand Duke Sergei Alexandrovich (1891–1905)
- Alexander Kozlov (April–July 1905)
- Pyotr Durnovo (July–November 1905)
- Fyodor Dubasov (1905–1906)
- Sergei Gershelman (1906–1909)
- Vladimir Dzhunkovsky (1908–1913)
- Alexander Adrianov (1908–1915)
- Count Felix Sumarokov-Elston (May–September 1915)
- Joseph Mrozovsky (1915–1917)
- Mikhail Chelnokov (March 1 – 6, 1917)
- Nikolai Kishkin (March–September 1917)

=== Gorodskoy golova ===
Gorodskoy golova (городской голова, literally "City's head"), the head of the Moscow Executive body, was appointed by Moscow City Duma. This office is roughly equals the post of speaker of regional or municipal parliament with executive powers.

The post was established by Empress Catherine II in 1767. Gorodskoy golova was elected for a term of three years, and was confirmed in office by the Governor. In accordance with the city regulations of 1862 and 1870, Gorodskoy golova was elected for 4 years and approved by the Emperor. Gorodskoy golova was subordinate to the Governor-General. He presided over meetings of the Moscow city Duma.

Image	Name	In office
	Demid Demidovich Meshchaninov	6 October 1782 — 15 January 1786
	Semyon Dmitrievich Sitnikov	15 January 1786 — 1789
	Yegor Emelyanovich Emelyanov (acting)	1789
	Mikhail Pavlovich Gubin	1789 — 1792
	Afanasy Ivanovich Dolgov	1792 — 1795
	Vasily Yakovlevich Zhigarev	1795 — 1798
	Vladimir Yegorovich Emelyanov	January 1798 — 4 April 1799
	Mikhail Pavlovich Gubin	March 1802 — December 1803
	Dmitry Fedorovich Faleev	December 1803 — December 1806
	Gregory Abramovich Kiryakov	before 30 July 1807 — after May 1810
	Ivan Stepanovich Nasonov	January 1810 — 21 July 1811
	Aleksey Alekseyevich Kumanin	21 July 1811 — March 1813
	Peter Ivanovich Nakhodkin	September — the beginning of October 1812
	Shelaputin P. D. (acting)	October 1812 — after 21 January 1813
	Fyodor Ivanovich Kozhevnikov	March 1813 — 12 September 1814
	Mikhail Ivanovich Titov	1814 — 1819
	Andrey Yakovlevich Saveliev	23 January 1819 — 13 December 1821
	Alexey Gavrilovich Popov	13 December 1821 — 20 December 1824
	Konstantin Alekseevich Kumanin	20 December 1824 — 1828
	Alexey Alekseevich Mazurin	1 January 1828 — 31 December 1831
	Ivan Matveevich Yartsov	17 January 1831 — 1834
	Ivan Alekseevich Kolesov	7 February 1834 — 1837
	Valentin Alexeyevich Kumanin	1 January 1837 — 1840
	Alexander Vasilyevich Alekseyev	January 1840 — 2 October 1841
	Kondratiy Karpovich Shaposhnikov	October 1841 — 1843
	Andrey Petrovich Shestov	1843 — 1845
	Semyon Loginovich Lepeshkin	1846 — 1849
	Klavdiy Afanasievich Kiryakov	1 January — 10 August 1849
	Ilya Afanasievich Shchekin	1849 — 31 December 1851
	Pyotr Ivanovich Kumanin	26 November 1851 — 10 December 1851
	Kirill Afanasievich Kukin	January 1852 — 1855
	Efim Fedorovich Guchkov	November 1858 — 29 September 1859
	Sergey Dmitrievich Shiryaev	27 October 1859 — 1861
	Mikhail Leontievich Korolev	1 January 1861 — 10 April 1863
	Alexander Alekseevich Shcherbatov	10 April 1863 — 18 February 1869
	Vladimir Cherkassky	4 April 1869 — 13 March 1871
	Ivan Artemyevich Lyamin	13 March 1871 — 19 March 1873
	Sergey Alexandrovich Ladyzhensky (acting)	19 March — 16 October 1873
	Daniil Danilovich Schumacher	16 October 1873 — 16 April 1876
	Sergey Alexandrovich Ladyzhensky (acting)	16 April 1876 — 7 January 1877
	Sergei Tretyakov	7 January 1877 — 5 December 1881
	Boris Chicherin	22 December 1881 — 11 August 1883
	Mikhail Fedorovich Ushakov (acting)	11 August 1883 — 9 April 1885
	Stepan Alekseevich Tarasov	28 March — 19 September 1885
	Mikhail Fedorovich Ushakov (acting)	23 October — 9 November 1885
	Nikolay Alekseyev	9 November 1885 — 11 March 1893
	Mikhail Fedorovich Ushakov (acting)	11 March — 13 April 1893
	Konstantin Vasilievich Rukavishnikov	13 April 1893 — 19 April 1897
	Vladimir Mikhailovich Golitsyn	19 April 1897 — 25 October 1905
	Nikolay Ivanovich Guchkov	17 November 1905 — 18 December 1912
	Viktor Diodorovich Bryansky	19 December 1912 — November 1914
	Mikhail Vasilyevich Chelnokov	29 September 1914 — 28 March 1917
	Nikolay Ivanovich Astrov	March – June 1917
	Vadim Viktorovich Rudnev	11 July — 2 November 1917

=== Gradonachalnik ===
On 1 January 1905 Nicholas II established Moscow City Authority (московское градоначальство - moskovskoye gradonachal'stvo), largely independent of the Moscow Governorate. Moscow City Authority was headed by gradonachalnik (градоначальник, literally "city's chief").

- Ivan Nikolayevich Rudnev (acting, 1 January 1905 – 16 January 1905)
- Evgeny Nikolayevich Volkov (16 January 1905 – 18 April 1905)
- Pavel Pavlovich Shuvalov (18 April 1905 – 28 June 1905)
- Ivan Nikolayevich Rudnev (acting, 28 June 1905 – 16 July 1905)
- Georgy Petrovich von Medem (16 July 1905 – 30 December 1905)
- Anatoly Anatolyevich Reynbot (7 January 1906 – 11 December 1907)
- Aleksandr Aleksandrovich Adrianov (7 February 1908 – 30 May 1915)
- Vadim Nikolayevich Shebeko (17 February 1916 – 1 March 1917)

== Russian SFSR ==
Both state and communist officeholders were called heads of Moscow.

=== Communist heads of Moscow ===
Until March 1990, the first secretaries of the Moscow City Committee of the CPSU were the de facto real influential leaders of Moscow

=== State (nominal) heads of Moscow ===
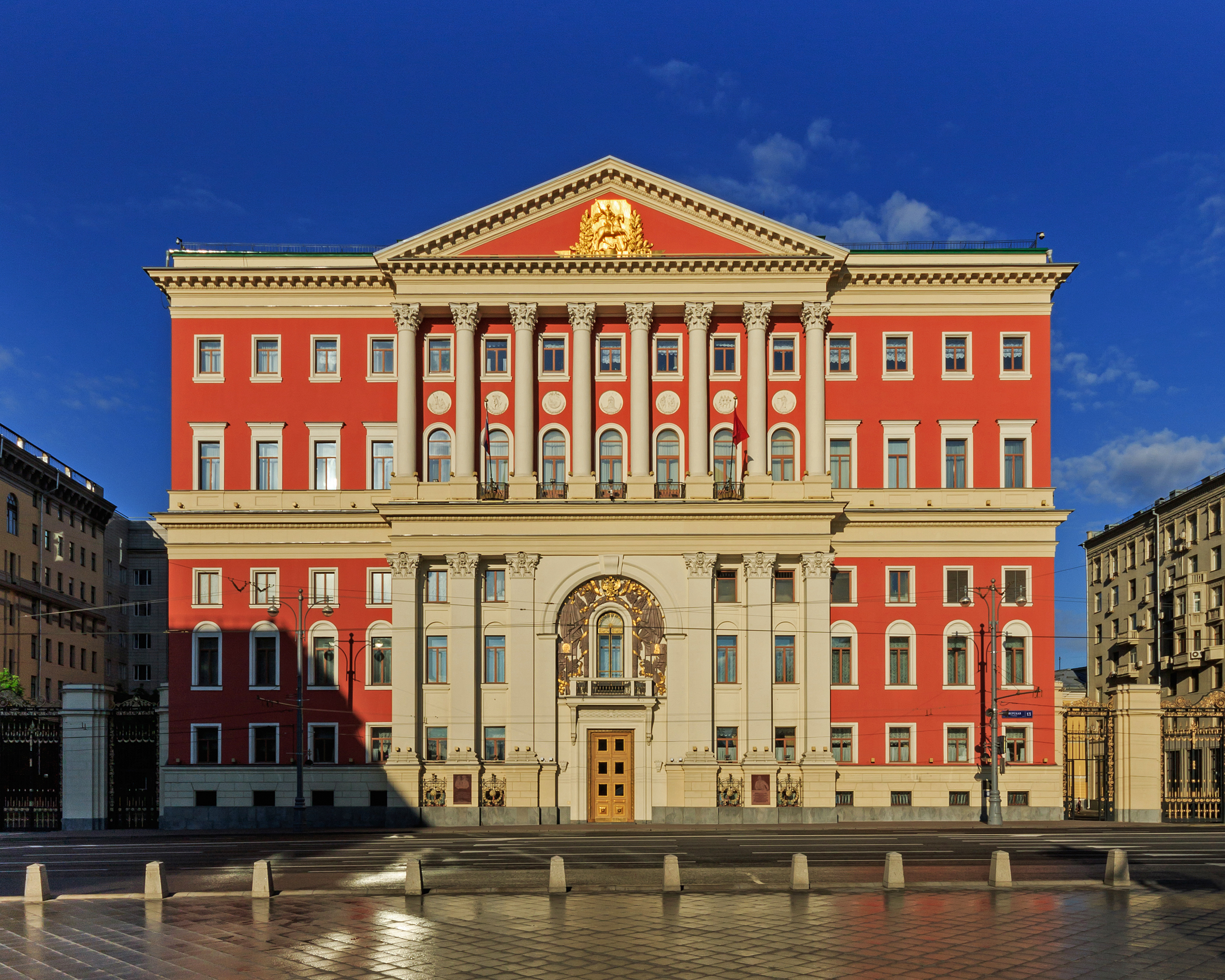
Moscow City Soviet of People's Deputies (Mossovet) building, aka Moscow Governor General House, "Tverskaya Street, 13" was built in 1778–1782. Now Residence of the Mayor of Moscow.

Chairmen of the Presidium of the executive committee of Moscow Council of Workers' Deputies:

- Viktor Nogin (September to November 1917)

Chairmen of the Presidium of the Moscow Council of Workers' and Soldiers' Deputies:

- Mikhail Pokrovsky (1917–1918)

Chairmen of the Presidium of the Moscow Council of Workers' and Red Armymen's Deputies:

- Pyotr Smidovich (March to October 1918)

Chairmen of the Presidium of the Moscow Council of Workers', Peasants' and Red Armymen's Deputies:

- Lev Kamenev (1918–1926)

Chairmen of the executive committee of the Moscow Council of Workers', Peasants' and Red Armymen's Deputies:

- Konstantin Ukhanov (1926–1929)

Chairmen of the executive committee of the Moscow Regional Council of Workers', Peasants' and Red Armymen's Deputies:

- Konstantin Ukhanov (1929–1931)

Chairmen of the executive committee of the Moscow City Council of Workers', Peasants' and Red Armymen's Deputies:

- Nikolai Bulganin (1931–1937)
- Ivan Sidorov (1937–1938)
- Aleksandr Yefremov (1938–1939)

Chairmen of the executive committee of the Moscow City Council of Labourers' Deputies:

- Vasili Pronin (1939–1944)
- Georgi Popov (1944–1949)
- Mikhail Yasnov (1950–1956)
- Nikolai Bobrovnikov (1956–1961)
- Nikolai Dygai (1961–1963)
- Vladimir Promyslov (1963–1977)

Chairmen of the executive committee of the Moscow City Council of People's Deputies:

- Vladimir Promyslov (1977–1985)
- Valery Saykin (1986–1990)
- Yury Luzhkov (1990–1991)

== Moscow after 1991 ==
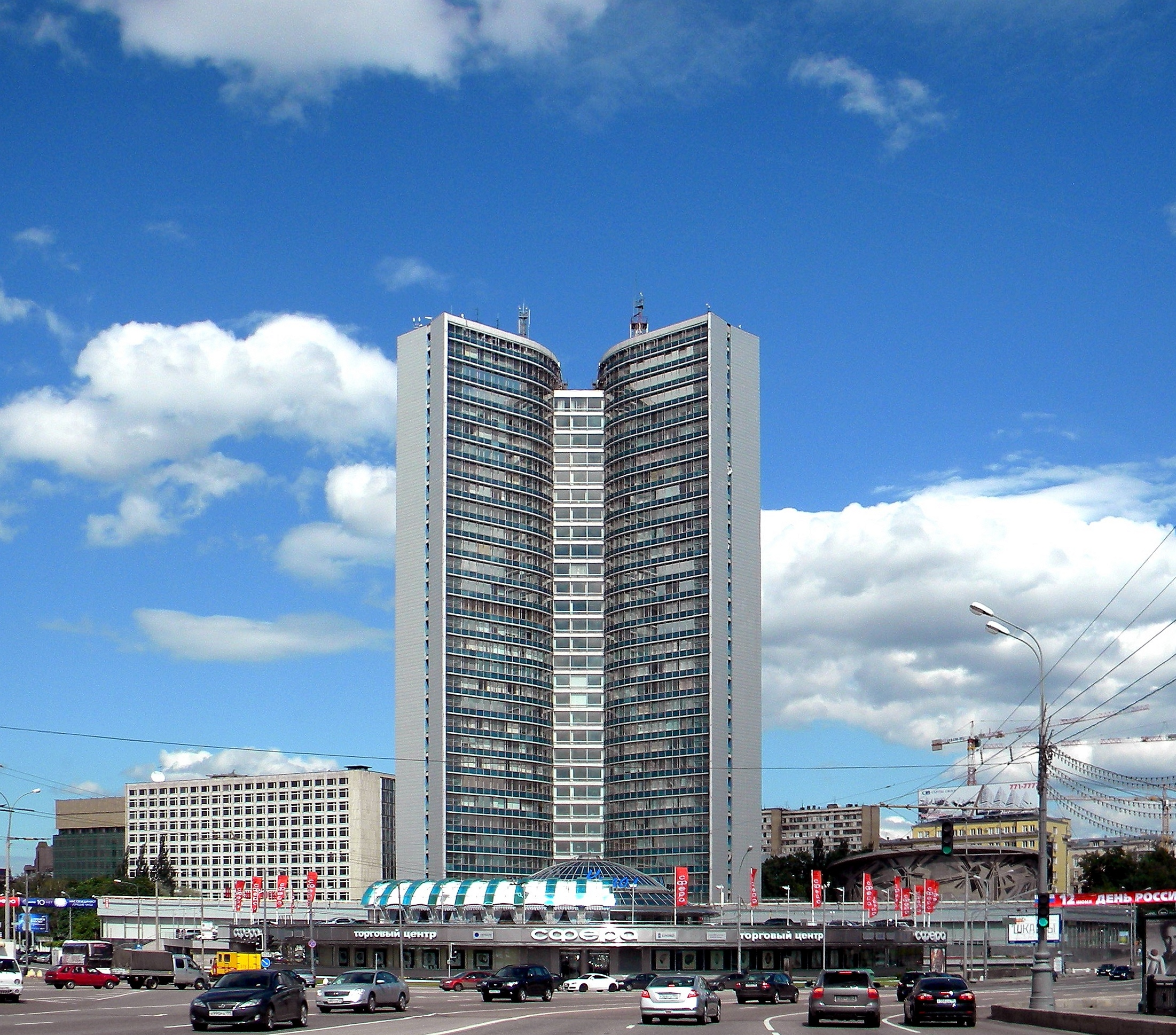
House of the Government of Moscow since 1990s (New Arbat Avenue, 36/9). Former Comecon building.

Mayor of Moscow is the holder of the highest office of subject of the Russian Federation. The separate office of the Premier of the Government of Moscow existed from 1991 to 2001.

Mayors:

- Gavriil Popov (1991–1992)
- Yuri Luzhkov (1992–2010)
- Vladimir Resin (2010) (acting)
- Sergey Sobyanin (2010–present)

== See also ==
- First Secretary of the Moscow City Committee of the Communist Party of the Soviet Union
- List of heads of Saint Petersburg government
