= Nikolay Alekseyev =

Mayor of Moscow from 1885 to 1893

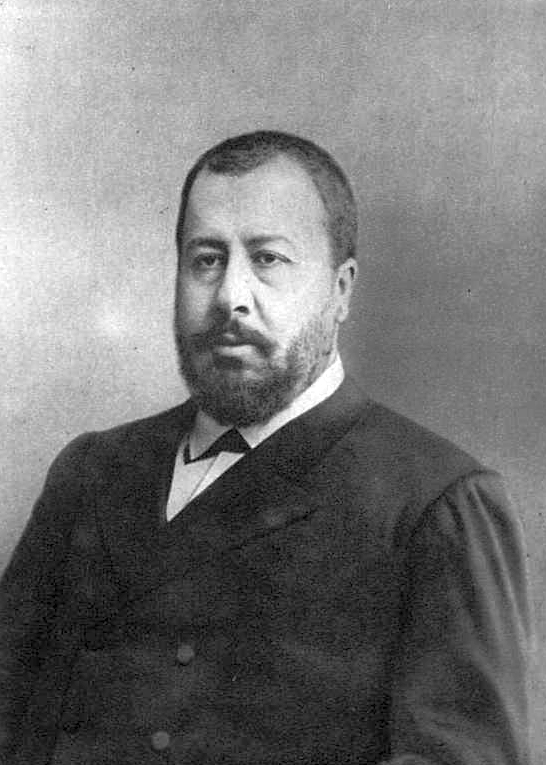
- Born: 1852; Moscow, Russian Empire
- Died: 25 (OS 13) March 1893; Moscow
- Cause of death: Complications of a gunshot wound
- Resting place: Novospassky Monastery (grave destroyed)
- Political party: Non-partisan

Mayor of Moscow
- In office 1885–1893

Nikolay Aleksandrovich Alekseyev (Russian: Николай Александрович Алексеев, 1852 –25 (OS 13) March 1893) was the elected mayor of Moscow in 1885–1893. Alekseyev is credited with construction of the city's first sanitation system, the first pressurized water supply network reaching individual houses, a psychiatric hospital and 30 new public schools. Alekseyev reorganized the city finances, significantly increasing the share of non-tax revenue from city-owned commercial ventures, and was known for unorthodox and successful fundraising campaigns for the municipal charities. Alekseyev was a long-time sponsor of Moscow Conservatory and local musicians; during his tenure the city acquired the Tretyakov Gallery.

Alekseyev was shot in his office by an insane visitor. He remains the only mayor of Moscow to be assassinated.

== Biography ==
=== Family roots ===
Nikolay Alekseyev belonged to the fourth generation of an old and wealthy family of traders and industrialists that settled in Alekseyevskaya Street (no direct connection) of Tagansky District after the Fire of 1812. The area was a traditional Old Believers community, however, Alekseyevs were mainstream Orthodox. Their main asset in Moscow, a copper foundry with wire-making plant, was placed one block to the north from the family mansion. The family was connected through marriages to Tretyakov, Mamontov, Chetverikov business clans, the Sheremetevs and the Greek diaspora. A distant relative, Alexander Vasilyevich Alekseyev, has served as the mayor of Moscow in 1840–1841, although then the mayor's role was far less significant than in the 1880s.

Alekseyev's mother was an ethnic Greek; Boris Chicherin, mayor of Moscow in 1882–1885, said that "Alekseyev's character merged cunning and refinement of a Greek with the arrogance of a Russian" (Russian: Он соединил в себе хитрость и утонченность грека с разнузданностью русской натуры). Actor and theater director Konstantin Stanislavsky, also born Alekseyev, was Nikolay's cousin; he chose a different stage name to disassociate the family from his theatrical endeavours.

=== Early years ===
Nikolay was home schooled, spoke three foreign languages, but never attended university or received any formal qualification. Like his cousin Konstantin, he leaned to the performing arts, spending his youth in the bohemian musical circles. A close friend of Nikolay Rubinstein, Alekseyev co-financed Moscow Conservatory and independent Moscow Opera together with his older mentor Sergei Tretyakov (mayor of Moscow in 1876–1882) and frequently acted as a manager for musicians. At the same time, Alekseyev in his twenties managed the textile assets of the family and was responsible for retooling the factories with modern machinery and technologies. His proactive, assertive attitudes were not always welcomed by Moscow elite; influential banker and philanthropist, head of Moscow commodity exchange Nikolay Naidenov remained outspokenly hostile to Alekseyev throughout his life.

This exposure to real-life business problems eventually led Alekseyev to seek public office. In 1880 he was elected to Moscow Governorate Duma, in 1881 to the Moscow City Duma; as the member of Duma he participated in various municipal activities from the school board to the coronation of Alexander III (1883).

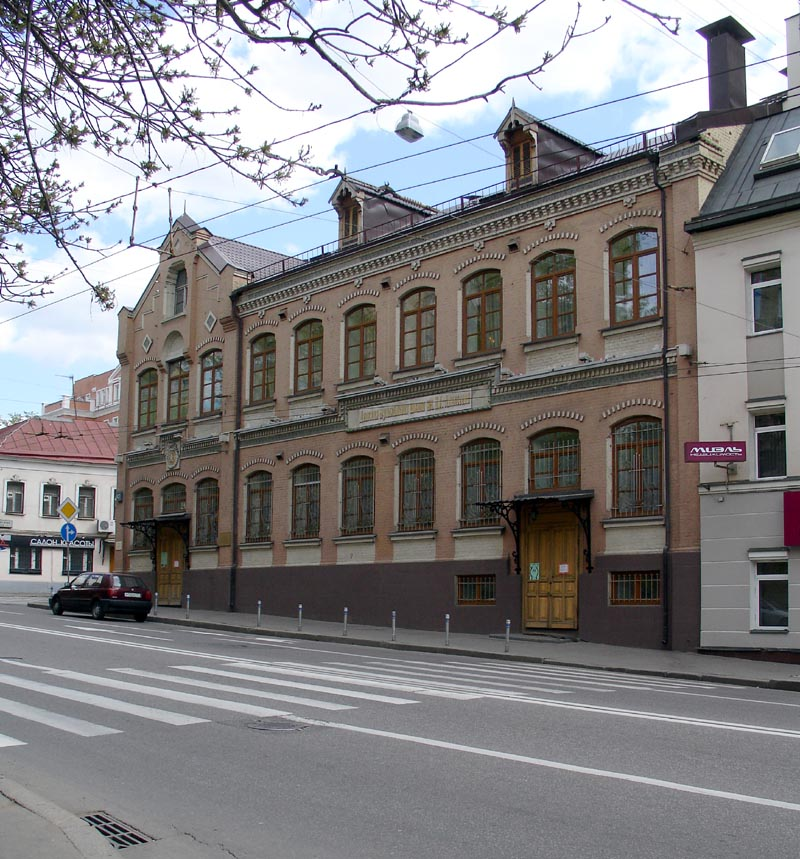
Alekseyev School of Music in Tagansky District, originally an elementary municipal school. In 1884 Alekseyev donated the building to the city as a tribute to his late father.

=== 1885 election ===
The municipal election of 1885 was regulated by the City Statute of 1870. According to the law, all payers of property tax were eligible to vote; however, to dilute the share of small homeowners, the eligible voters were split into three unequal groups based on their tax assessment. In the 1880s these groups numbered 2–3, 5–6 and 12–15 thousand voters for a population of 753 thousand. Each group elected 60 representatives to the City Duma. 180 members of the Duma elected the Mayor who, ex officio, presided over the Duma sessions. Boris Chicherin described the members of the Duma as "absent nobles, indifferent merchants and arrogant democracy". The latter group consisted of uneducated petty traders, laborers and farmers, and was known as the black hundred. Savvy beyond reasonable limit, the black hundred regularly blocked legitimate municipal projects as too expensive or unnecessary.

The number of candidates at the Duma election was unlimited; election by list voting with black and white balls was time-consuming, causing voter absenteeism. Contemporaries estimated that only 3 to 6% of less than 20 thousand eligible voters showed up at the 1880 elections. Politics were dominated by around 300 wealthy families, many of them parts of historical business clans. In 1885, Alekseyev, then only 32 years old, succeeded in bringing the sleeper voters to the elections, thus reducing the weight of black hundred and easily winning the mayoral ballot in November. He succeeded in shaping up a loyal majority coalition; balancing between a strongman administration and continuous mediation of the rivalling clans, Alekseyev managed to maintain support for his initiatives in the Duma and among the business circles.

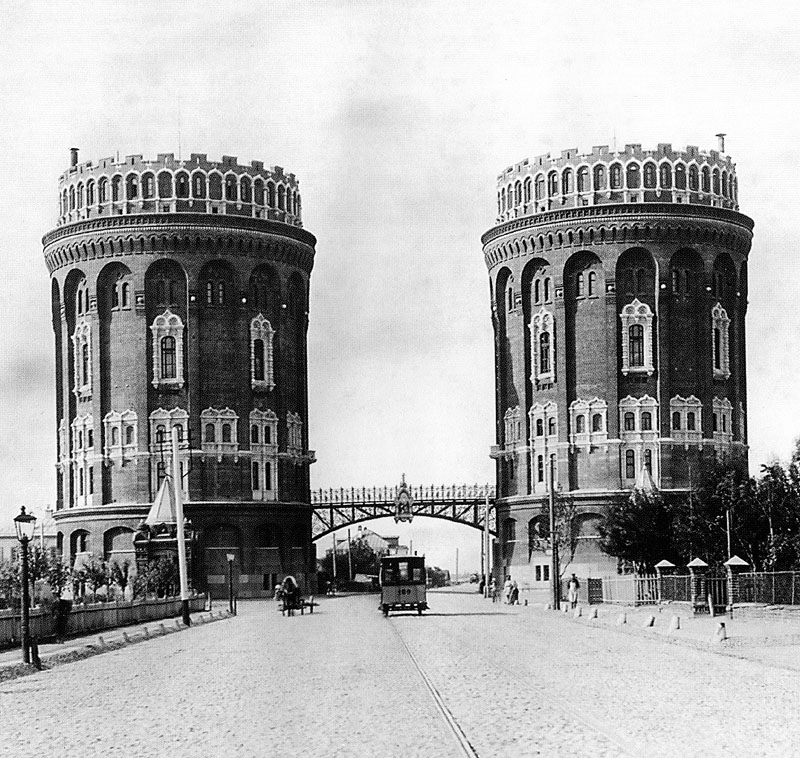
Two water towers, erected in 1892, provided pressure for the new water supply. They were demolished in the 1930s to make way for the expansion of Prospekt Mira.

=== Municipal projects ===
Alekseyev started his tenure with the controversial shutdown of the Upper Trade Rows on the Red Square. The building, erected in 1815 by Joseph Bove, was torn down in 1889 and replaced with the new Upper Trade Rows, designed by Alexander Pomerantsev, in 1890–1893. In 1890 he launched construction of a new Duma building on the nearby Voskresenskaya Square; the project was criticized for its outward pseudo-Russian style and cost overruns.

Moscow of 1885 had no sanitation and no water supply network in present sense: water flowed from Mytishchi in the open trench of the Rostokino Aqueduct and was distributed to a limited number of fountains on the central squares. In the 1870s the city built three local water networks of inadequate capacity that were abandoned by 1885. After long disputes between supporters of municipal and private water supply, in 1888 the city settled on building a single pressurized water system. Key element of the system – two tower-like water reservoirs near present-day Rizhsky Rail Terminal – were partially financed with Alekseyev's personal funds. The main distribution pipeline, 108 versts long, was completed during Alekseyev's tenure in 1892. In 1896 the system reached individual houses along the Garden Ring and in 1912 the city was able to require mandatory hookup to running water for all new buildings within the city limits.

In 1886–1889 Alekseyev sponsored detailed feasibility study of various sewage system layout. The modular plan, adopted in 1889, divided the city into practically independent parts (central and peripheral), making a provision for subsequent expansion of the city. The project was delayed by budget constraints; in 1892 the city raised money through a 49-year loan. The first 37 versts of large-bore sewage pipes were operational in 1894, half a year since Alekseyev's death; by the end of 1895 half of the system was complete and the city laid out its first sewage treatment facility.

Alekseyev supervised construction of a large municipal slaughterhouse placed beyond the city limits (present-day Mikoyan meat-processing plant); with its completion all inner city slaughterhouses were shut down.

Alekseyev, personally attached to the fate of the mentally sick, called for construction of a new psychiatric hospital in 1889; existing psychiatric hospital in Preobrazhenskoe, built before the war of 1812, was inadequate for the growing city. Alekseyev personally rallied wealthy muscovites for donations, his fundraising antics became a source of anecdotes. Nevertheless, he raised enough money to finance the first stage of the hospital which opened in 1894. Contemporary studies of Moscow charities assert that Alekseyev's efforts radically changed the pattern of business donations to the charities; they became a standard of business practice and continued to grow for two decades after his death.

In seven and half years of Alekseyev's tenure Moscow acquired 30 new schools, its first asphalt pavement, first permanent electrical power plant (1888), unified tram system (1891) and the Tretyakov Gallery (1892).

=== Municipal finance ===
Alekseyev's projects unbalanced the city budget, which operated at a significant deficit throughout the 1880s. He responded with investments into revenue-generating municipal enterprises. 1888, the year when the new central slaughterhouse became operational, is considered a breakthrough year: the city acquired its first large profitable asset. Income from city enterprises grew slowly but surely and by 1913 accounted for 55% of the city revenue.

Constrained with political connections, Alekseyev was reluctant to increase taxes; property taxes grew proportionate to city expansion, while the business tax rates decreased (collection remained at the same nominal amount despite rapid growth of the economy).

| Moscow city budget, 000 roubles | 1887 | 1897 |
|---|---|---|
| Property taxes | 1,199 | 3,158 |
| Business taxes | 2,052 | 2,039 |
| Profit of municipal enterprises | 359 | 1,707 |
| Rental income | 502 | 904 |
| Subsidies from central government | 318 | 1,460 |
| Other income | 282 | 1,549 |
| Total revenue | 4712 | 10,817 |
| Total spending | (6,071) | (10,817) |
| Deficit | (1,359) | – |

The city arranged for its first public loan in 1882; in 1886 Alekseyev diverted the proceeds to build the municipal slaughterhouse. He was reluctant to borrow more due to the Duma opposition against loans; the first major loan of this tenure was approved in 1892 to finance sewage system.

=== Relations with the Jews ===
Grand Duke Sergei Alexandrovich of Russia, appointed Governor of Moscow in February 1891, initiated a royal order for deportation of Jews from the city into the Pale of Settlement. The decree directly affected nearly half of estimated 20 thousands Moscow Jews, even including retired soldiers. According to the Western sources, Alekseyev supported the deportation and provided the city resources to the police action managed by the Grand Duke. The operation continued at the time of Alekseyev's death and installed "an eternal hatred for him among the Russian-Jewish diaspora." S. M. Dubnow, author of "History of Jews in Poland and Russia" (1918) even branded Alekseyev "an ignorant merchant with a shady reputation", and alleged that his efforts were motivated by rivalry with Jewish banker Lazar Polyakov (incorrectly described as the owner of a "rural bank").

On the contrary, Alekseyev sided with prime minister Witte in his campaign in support of Bukharan Jews. This may be explained by long-standing ties between Moscow textile industry and the Central Asian cotton traders (including Bukharan Jews).

=== Death and legacy ===
21 March (OS 9), 1893, a man named Andrianov fatally shot the mayor in his City Hall study. Early reports called the shooter a nihilist, but he was later attested to be insane. After four days of agony, Alekseyev died on 25 March (OS 13). Shortly before his death he instructed his wife to pledge 300,000 roubles of their personal wealth to the completion of the psychiatric hospital; the wish was fulfilled, and the hospital, inaugurated in 1894, was named in Alekseyev's honour.

His funeral at Novospassky Monastery cemetery was attended by 200 thousand mourners. The cemetery was destroyed in the 1930s, and the site of his grave was lost.

Alekseyev's achievements and charismatic personality became a yardstick for evaluation of municipal officers until World War I. His immediate successor, Konstantin Rukavishnikov, completed the projects launched by Alekseyev and got rid of the budget deficit, but lost the 1897 reelection to the public opinion of "not matching his too splendid forerunner".

The city remained divided into pro-Alekseyev and anti-Alekseyev factions; his memories were frequently invoked by politicians for support of their own and for denigration of their opponents' initiatives.

== See also ==
- Carter Harrison III, Carter Harrison IV and Seki Hajime – contemporary mayors of Chicago and Osaka analyzed in the Blair A. Ruble book (see References)
- Max Hoeppener – lead architect of municipal projects in Moscow during Alekseyev's tenure
