= Romodanovsky =

Romodanovsky (masculine), Romodanovskaya (feminine), or Romodanovskoye (neuter) may refer to:

- Romodanovsky (family), a princely family of Rurikid stock
- Romodanovsky District, a district of the Republic of Mordovia, Russia
