= Semyon Zakharovich Ginzburg =

Semyon Ginzburg
- Семён Гинзбург
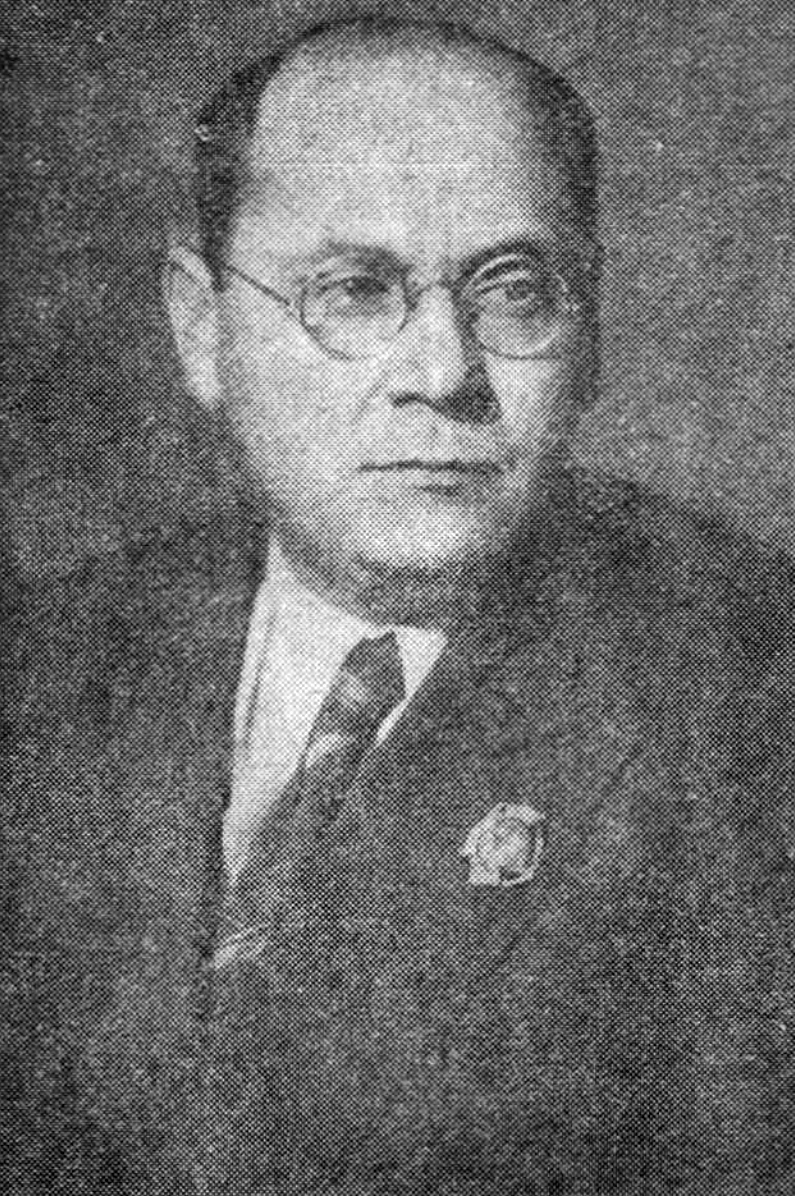

Minister of the Construction Materials Industry of the USSR
- In office 11 March 1947 – 29 May 1950
- Preceded by: Lazar Kaganovich
- Succeeded by: Pavel Yudin

Minister of Construction of Military and Naval Enterprises of the USSR
- In office 19 March 1946 – 14 June 1947
- Preceded by: himself
- Succeeded by: Nikolai Dygai

People's Commissar for the Construction of Military and Naval Enterprises of the USSR
- In office 19 January 1946 – 15 March 1946
- Preceded by: Position established
- Succeeded by: himself

People's Commissar for Construction of the USSR
- In office 16 June 1939 – 19 January 1946
- Preceded by: Position established
- Succeeded by: Position abolished

Personal details
- Born: 4 November 1897 Pokrovskoye, Russian Empire
- Died: 15 May 1993 (aged 95) Moscow, Russia
- Resting place: Novodevichy Cemetery
- Party: CPSU
- Education: Moscow Higher Technical School
- Awards: Order of Lenin; Order of the Red Banner of Labour; Order of the Red Star

Semyon Zakharovich Ginzburg (Russian: Семён Захарович Гинзбург; 4 November 1897 – 15 May 1993) was a Soviet politician and the first People's Commissar for Construction of the USSR. He was a member of the 7th Central Executive Committee of the USSR and a deputy of the 1st and 2nd convocations of the Supreme Soviets of the USSR. He was also a member of the Central Control Commission of the CPSU (1930–1934). He was an Honored Builder of the RSFSR (1966). He was an Associate Professor (1927) and a full member of the USSR Academy of Construction and Architecture (1957).

== Biography ==
He was born on October 23 (November 4), 1897, in Minsk. He was the son of a civil servant. He was the brother of Soviet party leader V. Z. Turov and the brother of civil engineer I. Z. Ginzburg. From 1915 to 1917, he studied at a secondary school in Penza. From 1917 to 1918, he was secretary of the Zhizdrinsky Soviet of Workers' and Soldiers' Deputies, Kaluga Governorate. In 1918, he was Head of the Information Department of the Moscow Provincial Executive Committee. From 1918 to 1919, he was Head of the Accounting and Distribution Department and Secretary of the RCP(b) Political Department of the 8th Army. From 1919 to 1921, he was Military Commissar of the Military Economic Academy.

In 1926, he graduated from the Moscow Higher Technical School with the title of designer. From 1927 to 1932, he was associate professor of the Reinforced Concrete Structures Department at MVTU.

From 1923, while still a student, he worked in Moscow on the construction of facilities for the All-Russian Agricultural and Handicraft-Industrial Exhibition. He also participated in the construction of the Khodynka Aerodrome and reinforced concrete hangars in Ochakov and Nikolaev. In 1924, at the invitation of Alexey Shchusev, he designed the structures of Lenin's Mausoleum. From 1926 to 1930, he was an assistant engineer on the construction of the Central Telegraph Building.

From 1929 to 1932, he headed the construction group of the People's Commissariat of Workers' and Peasants' Inspection of the USSR. In 1930, he was on a business trip to Germany, where he studied the use of thin-walled reinforced concrete shells in construction. He translated a work on thin-walled reinforced concrete domes and vaults from German. From 1932 to 1937, he was the head of the Main Construction Industry Directorate of the People's Commissariat of Heavy Industry of the USSR. He was a member of the Presidium of the Supreme Council of the National Economy, a member of the board of the People's Commissariat of Heavy Industry, Chairman of the Commission for the Development of the First Technical Specifications, editor of Volume 4 of the Industrial Designer's Handbook, and editor of the journal "Construction Industry. From January 26 to February 10, 1934, he was a delegate to the 17th Congress of the Communist Party of the Soviet Union with an advisory vote.

From 1936 to 1939, he was head of the Commission for Construction and Architecture of the Exhibition of Achievements of National Economy in Moscow. He was chairman of the Government Commission for the Acceptance and Operation of the Moscow Canal, the Building of Council of Labor and Defense, and the first stage of the Moscow Metro.

In 1937–1938, he was Deputy People's Commissar of Heavy Industry of the USSR. In 1938–1939, he was chairman of the Committee for Construction under the Council of People's Commissars of the USSR. In 1939–1946, he was People's Commissar for Construction of the USSR.

After the start of the Great Patriotic War, he oversaw the construction of defense plants in Siberia. During the Siege of Leningrad, he oversaw the construction of a gasoline pipeline along the bottom of Lake Ladoga.

From 1946 to 1947, he was People's Commissar and then Minister of Construction of Military and Naval Enterprises of the USSR. From 1947 to 1950, he was Minister of the Construction Materials Industry of the USSR. From 1950 to 1951, he was Deputy Minister of Construction of Mechanical Engineering Enterprises of the USSR. From 1951 to 1955, he was First Deputy Minister of the Oil Industry of the USSR. From 1955 to 1957, he was First Deputy Minister of Construction of Oil Industry Enterprises of the USSR. From 1957 to 1963, he was Deputy Chairman of the State Committee for Construction. From 1963 to 1970, he was Chairman of the Board of the USSR Stroybank.

He is the author of the books "Forty Years of Construction in Our Country" and "On the Past and the Future," as well as several articles in newspapers and magazines.

From July 1970, he was a personal pensioner of union significance. He died in Moscow on May 15, 1993. He was buried at the Novodevichy Cemetery.
