= Vasily Yershov =

Russian statesman

Vasily Semyonovich Yershov (Russian: Василий Семёнович Ершов) (1672 - after 1729) was a Russian statesman, governor (1711–1712) and vice governor of Moscow guberniya (1712–1719).

== Early career ==
According to some accounts, Vasily Yershov came from a family of serfs of Prince Mikhail Cherkassky. He began to progress up the career ladder owing to his notable work as a pribylshchik (lit. profit man), a person developing projects for increasing government revenues. In 1704–1709, Vasily Yershov headed the Office of Court Affairs (Канцелярия дворцовых дел) and then Horse-and-Carriage Service. Some contemporary evidence suggests that, as head of these two government offices, Yershov managed to increase their total revenue by 90,000 rubles.

== Yershov as governor and vice governor ==
On February 22, 1711, Vasily Yershov replaced Tikhon Streshnev as the governor of Moscow guberniya. In January 1712, however, he was transferred to the position of vice governor due to his "ignoble" ancestry (Mikhail Romodanovsky was appointed the governor of Moscow). Upon the death of his superior in January 1713, Vasily Yershov headed the gubernatorial office for half a year until the appointment of Alexei Saltykov. Yershov was known for his cussedness, for which the senators would often threaten him with administrative punishment or prison. Also, he was in constant disagreement with Alexei Saltykov, who had been the Senate's appointee. In 1714, the Senate even issued a special decree forbidding the vice governor to make certain decisions without the approval of his immediate superior. In 1715, Vasily Yershov publicly accused Alexei Saltykov of embezzlement, causing the latter's removal from the office. Yershov kept his post upon the appointment of the new governor Kirill Naryshkin. Vasily Yershov is known to have elaborated numerous projects on increasing government revenues, cracking down on the escaping of army recruits, collecting arrears, eliminating extortion in state-run offices etc.

== Later life ==
In 1721–1723, Vasily Yershov was in charge of the Monastery Prikaz. In 1727, he fell into disgrace as an associate of Alexander Menshikov, who had been arrested and then expelled from Moscow in the early fall of the same year. In 1729, Vasily Yershov took monastic vows in Pereyaslavl-Zalessky with the consent of Peter II.
