= Vladimir Promyslov =

Soviet politician (1908–1993)

- Владимир Промыслов
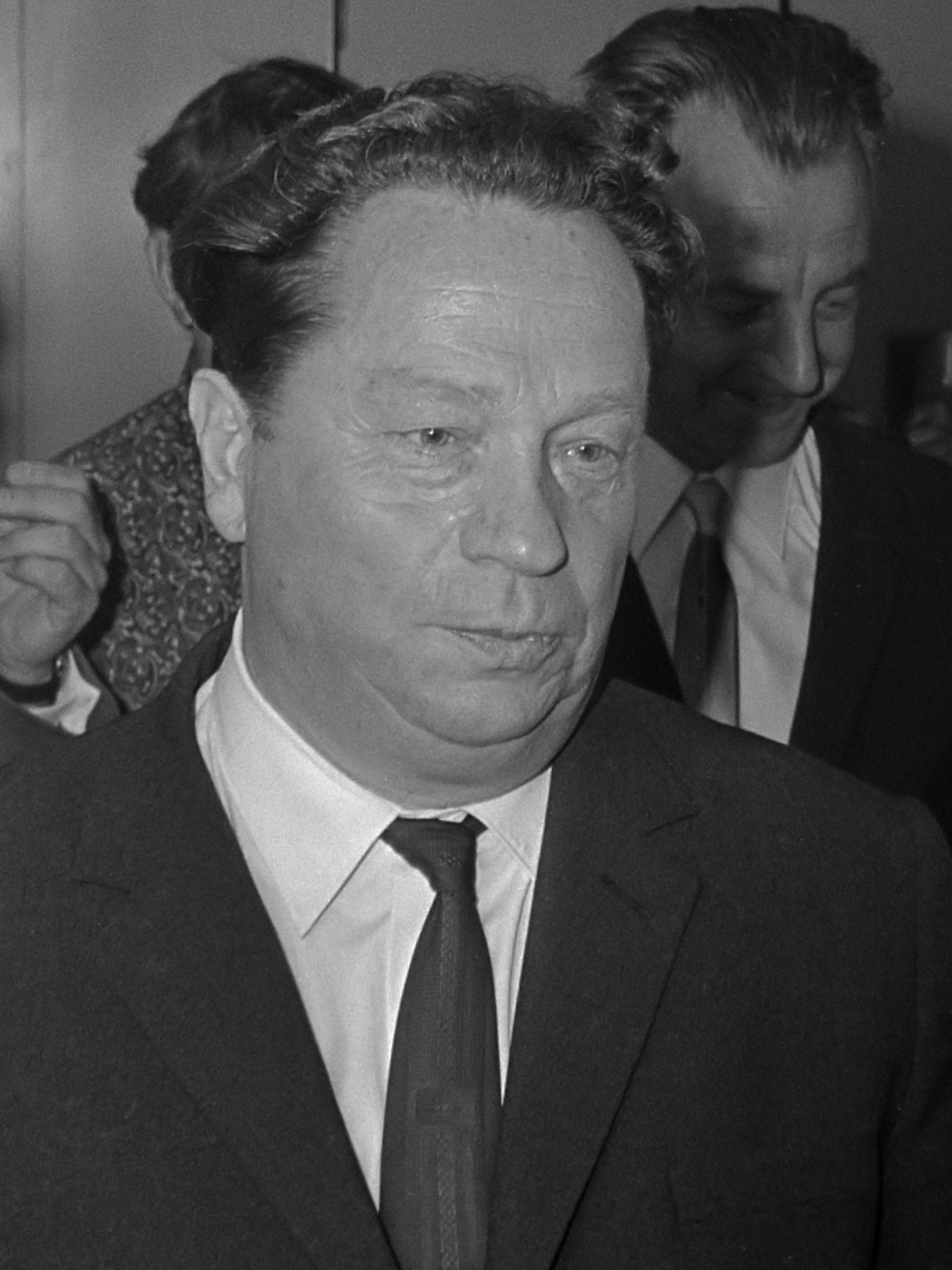
- Promyslov in 1968

Chairman of the Executive Committee of the Moscow Council of People's Deputies
- In office 13 March 1963 – 3 January 1986
- Preceded by: Nikolai Dygai
- Succeeded by: Valery Saykin

Personal details
- Born: 28 August 1908 Kolomensky Uyezd, Russian Empire
- Died: 22 May 1993 (aged 84) Moscow, Russia
- Resting place: Troyekurovskoye Cemetery
- Party: CPSU

Vladimir Fyodorovich Promyslov (Russian: Владимир Фёдорович Промыслов; 28 August 1908 – 22 May 1993) was a Soviet politician. He served as the Mayor of Moscow between 1963 and 1986 and was succeeded by Valery Saykin.

== Life and career ==
Promyslov was born in Kabuzhskoye, Kolomensky Uyezd.

A professional builder, Promyslov graduated from Moscow Construction Engineering Institute, and was appointed head of the Moscow construction department by Nikita Khrushchev. In 1963 he was appointed chairman of the Moscow Executive Committee, a position equivalent to that of Mayor. During his term the Ostankino Tower, the Rossiya Hotel, and dozens of new subway stations were built. In 1980 Moscow hosted the 1980 Summer Olympics, and several sport venues were constructed for it, among them the Luzhniki Stadium and the Olympic Stadium.

Promyslov also oversaw the completion of the administrative subdivisions reform, which divided Moscow into 20 raions. This reform is now considered unsuccessful and was reverted during the 1990s.

He died in Moscow, and was buried at the Troyekurovskoye Cemetery.
