= Ivan Sidorov =

- Иван Сидоров
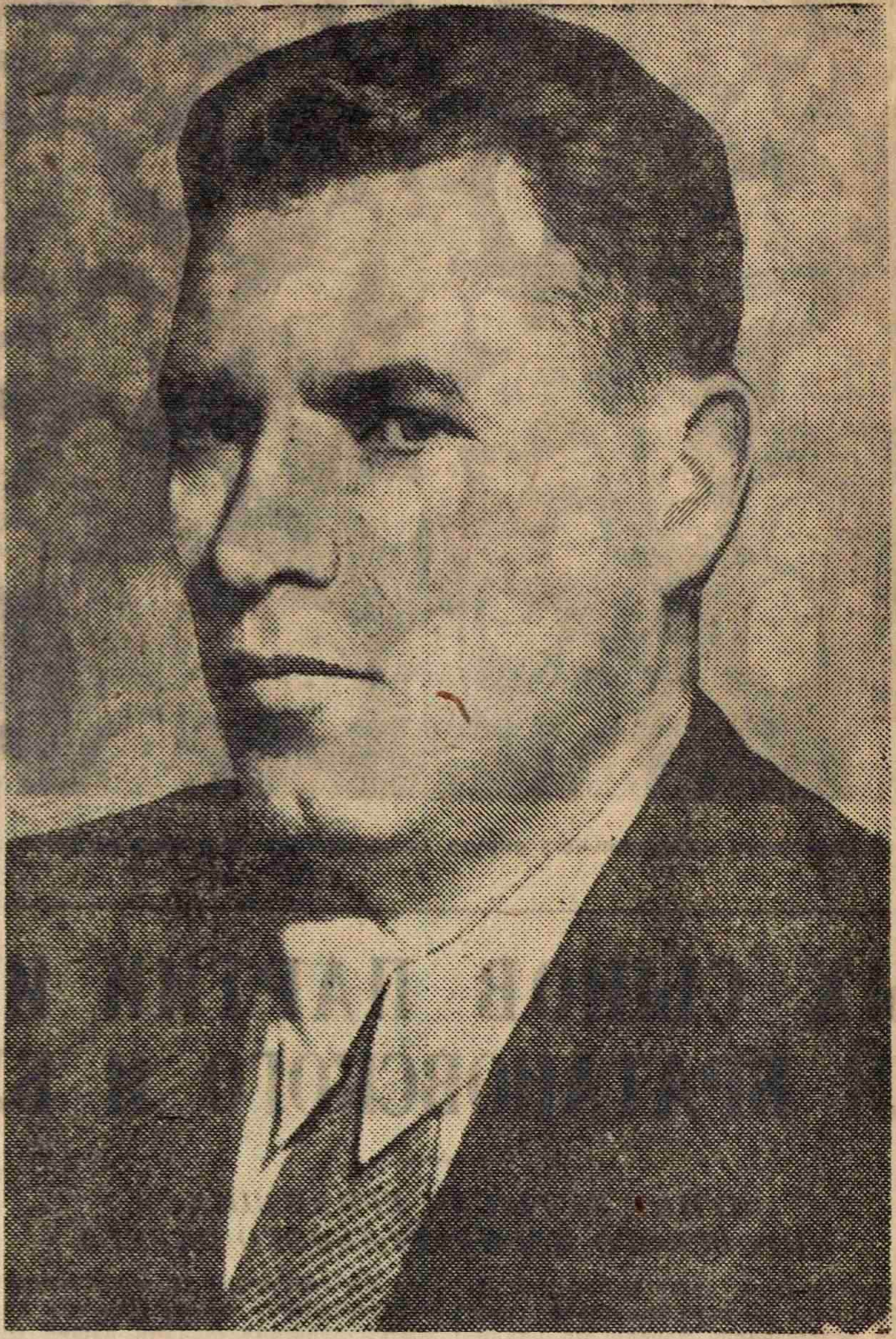

Mayor of Moscow
- In office 11 August 1937 – 3 November 1938
- Preceded by: Nikolai Bulganin
- Succeeded by: Aleksandr Yefremov

Personal details
- Born: 26 August 1897 Parfentyevo, Kolomensky Uyezd, Russian Empire
- Died: 24 January 1984 (aged 86) Moscow, Soviet Union
- Party: CPSU

Ivan Ivanovich Sidorov (Russian: Иван Иванович Сидоров; August 26 [September 7], 1897 – 24 January 1984) was a Soviet politician who served as chairman of the Executive Committee of the Moscow City Council (mayor of Moscow) from 1937 to 1938.

== Biography ==
He was born in the village of Parfentyevo, Kolomensky Uyezd, Moscow Governorate, to a peasant family. From 1912 to 1918, he worked as a lathe operator at the Kolomna Machine-Building Plant. He became a member of the Communist Party of the Soviet Union in 1918. From 1918 to 1922, he served in the Red Army, participated in the Russian Civil War, and served as a political worker. From 1922 to 1924, he was a lathe operator at the locomotive repair plant in Kolomna. From 1924 to 1925, he was chairman of the Parfentyevo Volost Executive Committee.

From 1925, he held positions of responsibility in Kolomna, Volokolamsk, and Moscow:

1925–1928 he served as Head of the Finance Department of the Kolomna District Executive Committee. From 1928–1929 he served as Chairman of the Volokolamsk District Executive Committee. From 1929–1930 he served as head of the Moscow District Land Department. In 1930–1932 he served as Deputy Head of the Moscow Regional Land Department. In 1932–1933 he served as director of the Moscow Regional Dairy and Livestock Trust. In September 23, 1933 – April 15, 1937 he served as head of the Department of City Lands and Land Allocation of the Moscow City Council. In April–June 1937 he served as Manager of the Moskultstroy Trust of the Moscow City Council Construction Department. On June 28 – August 9, 1937 he served as the Head of the Housing Construction Department of the Moscow City Council.

From August 11, 1937 to November 3, 1938, he was Chairman of the Moscow City Council. He was dismissed from his post for "failure to cope with the tasks assigned to him". He was then sent to work in Tambov. From 1939 to 1942, he was Head of the Tambov Regional Department of Public Utilities. From 1942 to 1953, he was Deputy Chairman of the Regional Executive Committee. From 1953 to 1955, he was Head of the Regional Department of Trade. From 1955 to 1960, he was Head of the Regional Department of Trade.

After retiring in 1960, he lived in Moscow.

From 1938 to 1947, he was a Deputy of the Supreme Soviet of the RSFSR. From 1937 to 1946, he was a deputy of the Supreme Soviet of the Soviet Union. From 1938 to 1939, he was a member of the Presidium of the Supreme Soviet of the USSR.

He died on January 24, 1984.
