= Nikolai Dygai =

- Николай Дыгай

Chairman of the Executive Committee of the Moscow City Council
- In office 2 September 1961 – 6 March 1963
- Preceded by: Nikolai Bobrovnikov
- Succeeded by: Vladimir Promyslov

Minister of Construction of the USSR
- In office 15 March 1953 – 23 September 1957
- Preceded by: Position established
- Succeeded by: Position abolished

Minister of Construction Machine of the USSR
- In office 9 March 1949 – 15 March 1953
- Preceded by: Position established
- Succeeded by: Position abolished

Minister of Military and Navy Construction
- In office 14 June 1947 – 9 March 1949
- Preceded by: Semyon Ginzburg
- Succeeded by: Position abolished

Personal details
- Born: 28 October 1909 Pokrovskoye, Russian Empire
- Died: 6 March 1963 (aged 53) Moscow, Russia
- Resting place: Kremlin Wall Necropolis
- Party: CPSU
- Awards: Order of Lenin; Order of the Red Banner of Labour; Order of the Red Star

Nikolai Aleksandrovich Dygai (Russian: Николай Александрович Дыгай; October 28 (November 11), 1908, Pokrovskoye, Don Host Oblast, Russian Empire – March 6, 1963, Moscow, RSFSR) was a Soviet politician who served as Minister of Construction of the USSR from 1953 to 1957 and chairman of the Executive Committee of the Moscow City Council of People's Deputies (Mayor of Moscow) from 1961 to 1963.

== Biography ==
Born into a family of farmers. From 1925 to 1926, he was an employee of the Don Regional Committee of the All-Union Leninist Young Communist League. From 1927 to 1929, he was a boilermaker at the Taganrog Metallurgical Plant. In 1929, he graduated from the Taganrog Evening Workers' Faculty, and in 1935, from the Military Engineering Academy of the Red Army. From 1935 to 1936, he was an engineer at the construction site of the Nizhny Tagil Metallurgical Plant. From 1937 to 1938, he was Chairman of the Executive Committee of the Nizhny Tagil City Council. From 1938 to 1939, he was Head of the Uraltyazhstroy Trust.

From 1939 to 1949, he was Head of Glavuralstroy and a member of the Board of the People's Commissariat for Construction of the USSR. In 1946-1947, he was Deputy People's Commissar (Minister). In 1947-1949, he was Minister of Construction of Military and Naval Enterprises of the USSR. In 1950-1953, he was Minister of Construction of Machine-Building Enterprises of the USSR. In 1954-1957, he was Minister of Construction of the USSR. In 1957-1958, he was Minister of Construction of the RSFSR. In 1958, he was Deputy Chairman of the Council of Ministers of the RSFSR. In 1958-1959, he was First Deputy Chairman of the State Planning Committee of the RSFSR. In 1959-1961, he was Chairman of the Commission of the Presidium of the Council of Ministers of the USSR on Capital Investments and Minister of the USSR. From September 1961 to 1963 he served as chairman of the Executive Committee of the Moscow City Council of People's Deputies (Mayor of Moscow).

He was a member of the Communist Party of the Soviet Union since 1929. Member of the CPSU Central Committee since 1961 (candidate since 1952). Deputy of the Supreme Soviet of the USSR of the 2nd, 4th, and 6th convocations.

He died in 1963. The urn containing his ashes is buried in the Kremlin Wall Necropolis. Following his death a memorial plaque was installed on the building he lived in at 14/9 Maly Levshinsky Lane where he lived in from 1947 to his death.
