= Neklinovsky District =

Neklinovsky District Неклиновский район (Russian)
- District
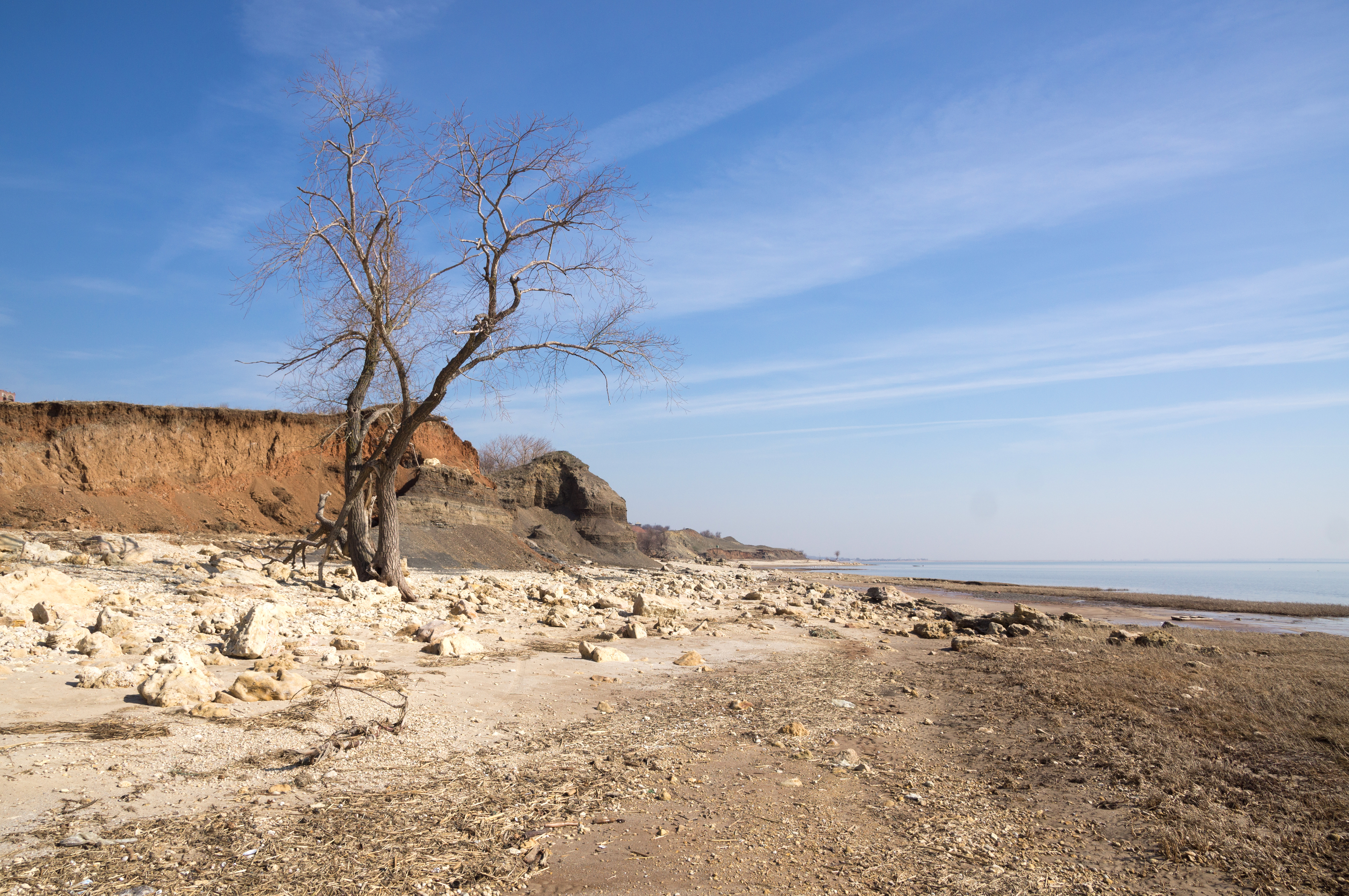
- Coast of the Sea of Azov in Neklinovsky District

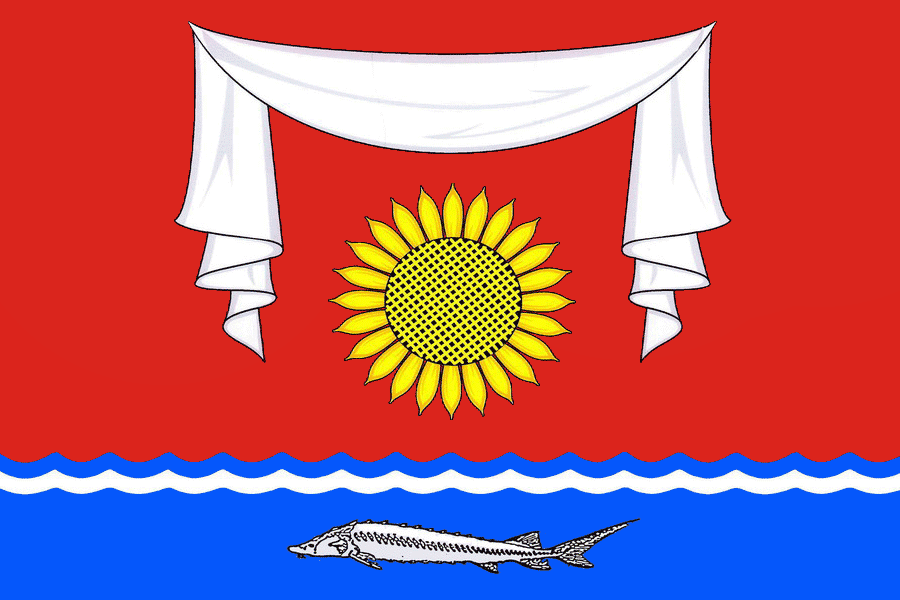
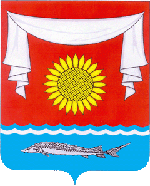
- Flag Coat of arms
- Location of Neklinovsky District in Rostov Oblast
- Coordinates: 47°24′59″N 38°53′56″E
- Country: Russia
- Federal subject: Rostov Oblast
- Established: 1936
- Administrative center: Pokrovskoye

Area
  - Total: 2,148 km^{2} (829 sq mi)

Population
  - Estimate (2021): 88,623
  - Urban: 0%
  - Rural: 100%

Administrative structure
  - Administrative divisions: 18 rural settlement
  - Inhabited localities: 126 rural localities

Municipal structure
  - Municipally incorporated as: Neklinovsky Municipal District
  - Municipal divisions: 0 urban settlements, 18 rural settlements
- Time zone: UTC+3 (MSK)
- OKTMO ID: 60636000
- Website: http://nekl.donland.ru/

Neklinovsky District (Russian: Некли́новский райо́н) is an administrative and municipal district (raion), one of the forty-three in Rostov Oblast, Russia. It is located in the west of the oblast, immediately adjacent to the border with Ukraine's Donetsk Oblast. It surrounds the city of Taganrog on that city's landward side. The area of the district is 2,148 square kilometers (829 sq mi). Its administrative center is the rural locality (a selo) of Pokrovskoye. Population: 88,623 (2021 Census); 84,915 (2010 Census); 82,706 (2002 census); 77,775 (1989 Soviet census). The population of Pokrovskoye accounts for 14.6% of the district's total population.

== Cultural and religious objects ==
- Church of All Saints (Sinyavskoe)
- St. Nicholas' Church in Nikolaevka

== Notable residents ==
- Vladimir Petlyakov (1891–1942), Soviet aeronautical engineer and aircraft designer, born in Sambek
- Andrei Uvarov (born 1971), football player
