= 20th Guards Motor Rifle Division =

Motor rifle division of the Russian Ground Forces

20th Guards Motor Rifle Division 8th Guards Mechanised Division 8th Guards Mechanised Corps 3rd Mechanised Corps
- 20-я гвардейская мотострелковая Прикарпатско-Берлинская дивизия
- Sleeve patch
- Active: 3 April 1943–2009; 2021–present
- Country: Soviet Union (until 1991); Russian Federation
- Branch: Red Army (until 1945); Soviet Ground Forces (1945-1991); Russian Ground Forces
- Type: Mechanized infantry
- Size: Division
- Part of: 8th Guards Combined Arms Army, Southern Military District
- Garrison/HQ: Volgograd
- Nickname: Zaleshchitskaya (Russian: Залещицкая)
- Engagements: World War II; Cold War; Russian invasion of Ukraine
- Decorations: Order of the Red Banner; Order of Suvorov 2nd class
- Honorifics: Carpathian; Berlin

Commanders
- Notable commanders: Lt. General Mikhail Katukov; Major General Kurkin; Colonel Aleksey Gorobets

The 20th Guards Carpathian-Berlin Motor Rifle Division (Russian: 20-я гвардейская мотострелковая Прикарпатско-Берлинская дивизия) is a formation of the Russian Ground Forces, originally formed within the Soviet Red Army as the 3rd Mechanised Corps. The division was reformed in 2021 from the former 20th Guards Motor Rifle Brigade.

== History ==
=== World War II ===
The division was formed as the second formation of the 3rd Mechanized Corps on 18 September 1942 at Kalinin in the Moscow Military District. Lieutenant General Mikhail Katukov took command. It was initially assigned to the 22nd Army of the Kalinin Front. It took part in Operation Mars alongside the 22nd Army. At the beginning of Operation Mars, the 3rd Mechanised Corps consisted of 232 tanks. Hamazasp Babadzhanian, who commanded the 3rd Mechanised Brigade of the corps, mentioned this operation briefly in his memoirs, quoting a conversation with the 22nd Army commander, Vasily Yushkevich, who said, "We will conduct a rather serious offensive together with Western Front forces—we must liquidate the enemy Rzhev grouping".

The Corps then fought in the Battle of Kursk, across Ukraine with the Central, Belorussian, and 1st Belorussian Fronts. On 23 October 1943, it was awarded 'Guards' status and re-designated the 8th Guards Mechanised Corps. In 1944, it took part in the Zhitomir-Berdichev, Korsun-Shevchenkovsky, Proskurov-Chernovits, and Lvov-Sandomir battles, gaining the 'Carpathian' honorific in April 1944. It ended the war in Berlin after participating in the Warsaw-Poznan and East Pomeranian offensives. In June 1945, recognising its role in capturing Berlin, it was awarded the honorific 'Berlin'. As part of the occupation forces, it was assigned to the 1st Guards Tank Army (later 1st Guards Mechanised Army).

In the immediate post-war period, the Corps was reorganised as the 8th Guards Mechanised Division. In May 1957, it was reorganised as the 20th Guards Motor Rifle Division bearing honorifics: Carpathia-Berlin, Red Banner, and Order of Suvorov. It was stationed at Grimma in eastern Germany. In 1964, the division was transferred to the 8th Guards Army. It took part in the 1968 invasion of Czechoslovakia as part of the 1st Guards Tank Army, although when it returned to East Germany, it reverted to the control of the 8th Guards Army. Became part of 1st Guards Tank Army in 1983, until 1993.

The division was withdrawn from Germany in June 1993, and moved to Volgograd in the North Caucasus Military District. There it was under the command of the reduced 8th Guards Army Corps, formerly the 8th Guards Army.

The division remained garrisoned in Volgograd, with parts of the division having taken part in the First and Second Chechen Wars. The division was engaged from December 1994 to February 1995 in the First Chechen War. On 31 December 1994, units of the division, together with the 131st Motor Rifle Brigade and the 81st Guards Motor Rifle Regiment, entered Grozny. On 13 January 1995, elements of the division began storming the Council of Ministers building. On 16 January, the building of the Council of Ministers was completely taken. On 21 January 1995, the 33rd MRR participated in the seizure of the Press House. On 5 February, the division occupied the Minutka Square. On 11 February 1995, after taking the main militant strongholds in Grozny, the division was withdrawn from the fighting and began to transfer its units to Volgograd. At the end of February 1995, the division was completely withdrawn from Chechnya.

In 1999, key units included the 56th Guards Air Assault Regiment; 242nd Guards Motor Rifle Regiment; 255th Guards MRR; 944th Guards Self-Propelled Artillery Regiment; 358th Guards Anti-Aircraft Rocket Regiment; and the 428th Tank Battalion.

In 2009, the division was renamed the 20th Guards Motor Rifle Brigade.

== Composition ==
=== 1988 Order of Battle ===
Order of Battle of the division in 1988:

- 20th Guards Motor Rifle Division Headquarters, Grimma
- 454th Independent Guards Communications Battalion, Grimma
- 68th Independent Guards Reconnaissance and Electronic Warfare Battalion, Plauen
- 1st Guards Tank Regiment, Glauchau
- 20th Independent Tank Battalion, Pomßen
- 29th Guards Lublin Red Banner Orders of the Suvorov and Kutuzov Motorised Rifle Regiment, Plauen
- 67th Guards Yaroslavl Red Banner Orders of the Suvorov and Bogdan Khmelnitsky Motorised Rifle Regiment, Grimma
- 242nd Guards Zaleschitsky Order of Lenin Red Banner Orders of Suvorov. Kutuzov and Bogdan Khmelnitsky Motorised Rifle Regiment, Wurzen
- 576th Bobruisk Order of Lenin Red Banner Order of the Suvorov Motor Rifle Regiment, Glauchau (BTR-60)
- 944th Guards Chernivtsi-Gnieznensky Red Banner Orders of the Suvorov and Bogdan Khmelnitsky Artillery Regiment, Leisnig
- 358th Guards Carpathian-Gneznensky orders of Kutuzov. Bogdan Khmelnitsky and Red Star Anti-Aircraft Missile Regiment, Leisnig
- 487th Separate Anti-Tank Battalion, Oshatts (MT-12)
- 133rd Independent Guards Carpathian Red Banner Engineer-Sapper Battalion, Leipzig
- 1124th Independent Material Supply Battalion, Grimma
- 39th Independent Equipment Maintenance and Recovery Battalion, Leipzig
- 347th Independent Medical Battalion, Grimma
- 153rd Independent Chemical Defence Battalion, Grimma

=== Reformation: 2021 ===
As of 2021, the Brigade was reportedly upgrading to division-level strength once again.

Ceremonies to mark the reformation of the division were held on December 1, 2021. The Division was reportedly planned to re-equip with the T-90M main battle tank. The transformation was reported as likely to be complete in 2022 and was reported to incorporate the following reconstituted formations:

- 33rd Motor Rifle Regiment (Kamyshin)
- 255th Motor Rifle Regiment (Volgograd)
- 944th Guards Self-Propelled Artillery Regiment
- 358th Guards Anti-Aircraft Missile Regiment
- 428th Separate Tank Battalion (near Volgograd)
- 487th Separate Anti-Tank Artillery Battalion.

== Footnotes ==
- ^{b} By 25 June The remnants of 5th Tank Division has been driven into the Western Front's area of control, and a report by the front's General Staff said "the remains of Northwestern Front's 5th Tank Division are concentrated 5 kilometres south east of Molodechno; 3 Tanks, 12 Armoured Cars, and 40 trucks".
