= Church of All Saints (Sinyavskoe) =

Orthodox temple in Sinyavskoe, Russia

The Church of All Saints

- Location within Russia

Religion
- Affiliation: Russian Orthodox

Location
- Location: Sinyavskoe village, Neklinovsky District, Rostov Oblast, Russia
- Coordinates: 47.1627°N 39.1732°E

Architecture
- Completed: 1806

The Church of All Saints (Russian: Церковь Всех Святых) is a Russian Orthodox church in Sinyavskoe village, Neklinovsky District, Rostov Oblast, Russia that was built in 1806. It is one of the oldest churches in the whole Rostov Oblast.

== History ==
In 1793, in the village of Sinyavskoye, the construction of the first wooden church began. It was completed and consecrated in 1794. The clerical archive data from 1801 describes this church as follows: "It was based on wooden pillars, its walls are reed, coated with clay and covered with bast. At the church there were 108 parish households, in them there were 323 men and 307 Malorossian women and also 26 households with 117 men and 98 Velikorossian women."

In 1802, due to the dilapidation of the church, local authorities decided to build a new stone church with the same name. In 1806 a solemn consecration of the new church took place. In 1863 a parish school was opened there.

In 1917 the church was looted and closed. In subsequent years, it also significantly dilapidated.

After the collapse of the Soviet Union, the church was returned to the Russian Orthodox Church and re-consecrated in the name of All Saints. On June 18, 2006, the bicentenary of the church was celebrated.
