= Mikhail Katukov =

Soviet general (1900–1976)

- Михаил Ефимович Катуков
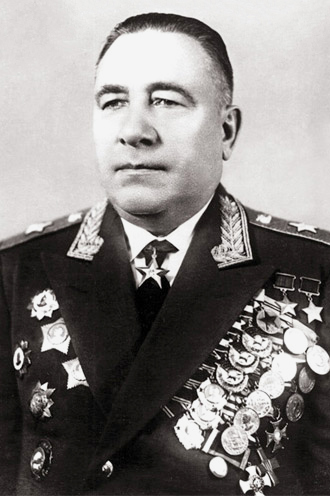
- Born: 17 September [O.S. 4 September] 1900; Bolshoe Uvarovo, Kolomensky Uyezd, Moscow Governorate, Russian Empire
- Died: 8 June 1976 (aged 75); Moscow, Russian SFSR, Soviet Union
- Military career
- Allegiance: Soviet Russia (1919–1922); Soviet Union (1922–1963)
- Service years: 1919–1963
- Rank: Marshal of the armoured troops
- Unit: Armoured Troops
- Commands: 1st Tank Corps; 3rd Mechanized Corps; 1st Tank Army/1st Guards Tank Army; 5th Guards Mechanized Army
- Conflicts: October Revolution; Russian Civil War; World War II; Battle of Moscow; Operation Mars; Battle of Kursk; Operation Bagration; Vistula Oder Operation; Battle of Berlin
- Awards: Hero of the Soviet Union (twice)
- Other work: Commander of Armored Forces of the Group of Soviet Forces in Germany; Inspector General of the Army

Marshal of Armoured Troops Mikhail Yefimovich Katukov (Russian: Михаил Ефимович Катуков [katuˈkɔf] 17 September [O.S. 4 September] 1900 – 8 June 1976) served as a commander of armored troops in the Red Army during and following World War II. He is viewed as one of the most talented Soviet armor commanders. Mikhail Katukov holds the honor of the first major victory of the Soviet armored forces, the victory from October 4 to October 11, 1941, at Mtsensk over the 3rd and 4th tank divisions, which were part of the Guderian's Panzergruppe 2 in the Battle of Moscow. His other notable command during the German-Soviet War was that of the 1st Guards Tank Army, which he commanded during the Battle of Kursk (1943), the Proskurov-Chernovtsy Operation (1944), the Lvov-Sandomierz Operation (1944), the Vistula–Oder Operation (1945), and the Battle of Berlin (1945). He commanded 1st Guards Tank Brigade during the Battle of Moscow (1941), and the 3rd Mechanised Corps during Operation Mars (1942).

== Early life ==
Katukov was born on 17 September [O.S. 4 September] 1900 in the village of Bolshoe Uvarovo in Kolomensky Uyezd, Moscow Governorate (now in the Ozyory Urban Okrug of Moscow Oblast) into an impoverished peasant family with five children. From a young age he worked on the local landowner's dairy farm. Katukov graduated from a rural primary school. In 1912, sent to relatives in Saint Petersburg, he worked as a messenger boy in a dairy shop, and later in the factories of the city. Katukov participated in the October Revolution in 1917, following which he returned to Bolshoe Uvarovo to take care of his family after his mother's death.

== Military career ==
Katukov enlisted in the Red Army as a private in 1919. He served during the Russian Civil War, and later served as a tank formation commander before the war. In 1935, he graduated from the Stalin Military Academy and in July 1936 he was promoted to captain. In October 1938, his first major command came as acting commanding officer of the 5th Light Tank Brigade of the 45th Mechanized Corps. He survived the purges.

=== Second World War ===
At the onset of the war, he took command of the 4th Tank Brigade. In the Battle of Moscow in 1941, it was Katukov's Tank Brigade, then part of the 1st Guards Rifle Corps, that checked the advance of Guderian's Panzergruppe 2 near Tula. To honor this achievement it became the 1st Guards Tank Brigade.

On November 11, 1941, Order No. 337 of the People's Commissar of Defense of the USSR was issued, which, in particular, stated:

"The 4th Tank Brigade, with brave and skillful combat actions from 04.10.1941 to 11.10.1941, despite the significant numerical superiority of the enemy, inflicted heavy losses on him and fulfilled the tasks assigned to the brigade to cover the concentration of our troops… As a result of the fierce battles of the brigade with the 3rd and 4th tank divisions and the enemy's motorized division, the fascists lost 133 tanks, 49 guns, 8 aircraft, 15 tractors with ammunition, up to an infantry regiment, 6 mortars, and other weapons. The losses of the 4th Tank Brigade are calculated in several units."

Although a later study of captured German documents showed that the number of German tank losses was significantly overstated in this order, and the losses in the tanks of the 4th Brigade as a result of the seven-day battles were generally comparable to the German ones, but the fact that the German offensive was suspended by smaller forces in the direction of the main strike was of great importance.

For these exploits, the 4th Tank Brigade became the first in the Red Army to receive the honorary title of "Guards" along with the Guards banner, and the new military formation became known as the 1st Guards Tank Brigade. The highest scoring Soviet and Allied tank ace Dmitry Lavrinenko, served within its ranks from September 1941.

Later, during Operation Mars in December 1942, Katukov's command managed a deep penetration into the German lines in Rzhev. In January 1943 he took command of the 1st Guards Tank Army, a post he held for the duration of the war.

In the Battle of Kursk, Katukov's command was one of the two armies that were hardest-hit by the initial German advance on the southern shoulder. Through the use of well-defended and sited strong-points, dug in tanks, and judicious use of counterattacks, Katukov managed to extract a high toll from the German attackers breaking through the defensive system.

He commanded his tank army in the Proskurov-Chernovtsy Operation, Lvov–Sandomierz Offensive, the Vistula–Oder Offensive, and the Battle of Berlin.

Mikhail Katukov was awarded the title of the Hero of the Soviet Union twice (23 September 1944 and 6 April 1945).

=== Post-War ===
Following the war, he became commander of the mechanized forces of the Group of Soviet Forces in Germany, and later Inspector General of the Army.

== In popular culture ==
In the 1970 film Patton, Katukov is portrayed (by an uncredited actor) drinking a toast with General Patton to celebrate their armies' mutual victory over Nazi Germany.

== Awards and honors ==
Soviet Union

Hero of the Soviet Union, twice (№ 4585 - 23 September 1944) (№ 4585 - 6 April 1945)
Four Orders of Lenin (10 November 1941, 23 September 1944, 21 February 1945, 6 April 1945)
Order of the Red Banner, three times (3 May 1944, 3 November 1944, 1949)
Order of Suvorov, 1st class, twice (29 May 1944, 19 May 1945)
Order of Kutuzov, 1st class (27 August 1943)
Order of Bogdan Khmelnitsky, 1st class (10 January 1944)
Order of the Red Star (28 October 1967)
Order "For Service to the Homeland in the Armed Forces of the USSR", 3rd degree (30 April 1975)
Medal "For the Defence of Moscow" (1944)
Medal "For the Defence of Kiev" (1961)
Medal "For the Liberation of Warsaw" (1945)
Medal "For the Capture of Berlin" (1945)
Medal "For the Victory over Germany in the Great Patriotic War 1941–1945" (1945)
Jubilee Medal "Twenty Years of Victory in the Great Patriotic War 1941-1945" (1965)
Jubilee Medal "Thirty Years of Victory in the Great Patriotic War 1941–1945" (1975)
Jubilee Medal "In Commemoration of the 100th Anniversary of the Birth of Vladimir Ilyich Lenin" (1969)
Jubilee Medal "XX Years of the Workers' and Peasants' Red Army" (1938)
Jubilee Medal "30 Years of the Soviet Army and Navy" (1948)
Jubilee Medal "40 Years of the Armed Forces of the USSR" (1958)
Jubilee Medal "50 Years of the Armed Forces of the USSR" (1968)
Medal "Veteran of the Armed Forces of the USSR" (1976)

Foreign

Patriotic Order of Merit in gold (East Germany)
Medal “For Strengthening Friendship in Arms”, Golden class (Czechoslovakia)
Virtuti Militari, 3rd class (Poland)
Order of Polonia Restituta, 3rd class (Poland)
Order of the Cross of Grunwald, 2nd class (Poland)
Medal "For Oder, Neisse and the Baltic" (Poland)
Medal "For Warsaw 1939-1945" (Poland)
Distinguished Service Order (United Kingdom)
Order of Sukhbaatar (Mongolia)
Order of the Red Banner (Mongolia)
Order of Military Merit (Mongolia)
Medal "30 Years of the Victory in Khalkhin-Gol" (Mongolia)
Medal "40 Years of the Victory in Khalkhin-Gol" (Mongolia)
Medal "50 Years of the Mongolian People's Revolution" (Mongolia)
Medal "30 Years of Victory over Militaristic Japan" (Mongolia)
Medal "50 Years of the Mongolian People's Army" (Mongolia)
