= Boris Chicherin =

Russian philosopher and jurist (1828–1904)

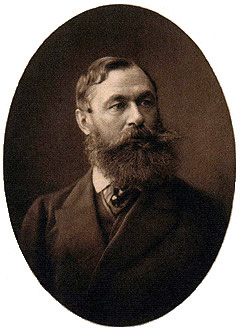

Moscow's Gorodskoy Golova
- In office 22 December 1881 – 11 August 1883
- Preceded by: Sergei Tretyakov
- Succeeded by: Mikhail Fedorovich Ushakov

Personal details
- Born: 7 June [O.S. 26 May] 1828 Karaul, Tambov Governorate, Russian Empire
- Died: 16 February [O.S. 3 February] 1904 (aged 75)
- Relations: Chicherins (ru)
- Parent(s): Nikolai Vasilyevich Chicherin; Ekaterina Borisovna Khvoshchinskaya
- Relatives: Georgy Chicherin (nephew)
- Education: Imperial Moscow University (1849)
- Occupation: Jurist; Philosopher; Historian; Politician

Boris Nikolayevich Chicherin (Russian: Бори́с Никола́евич Чиче́рин; 7 June [O.S. 26 May] 1828 – 16 February [O.S. 3 February] 1904) was a Russian jurist and political philosopher, who worked out a theory that Russia needed a strong, authoritative government to persevere with liberal reforms. By the time of the Russian Revolution, Chicherin was probably the most reputable legal philosopher and historian in Russia.

== Biography ==
Chicherin was born in the Tambov Governorate of the Russian Empire, where his noble ancestors had been residing for many centuries. In 1849, he matriculated from the law department of the Moscow University. On insistence of Dr. Timofey Granovsky, he continued to work in the university as a professor of Russian law. Together with his friend Konstantin Kavelin, he penned a comprehensive program of Russian liberalism which was published by Alexander Herzen in London.

Chicherin was a great champion of Alexander II's reforms of the 1860s, hailing them as "the best monument of Russian legislation". He said the tsar had been:

called upon to execute one of the hardest tasks which can confront an autocratic ruler: to completely remodel the enormous state which had been entrusted to his care, to abolish an age-old order founded on slavery, to replace it with civic decency and freedom, to establish justice in a country which it never known the meaning of legality, to redesign the entire administration, to introduce freedom of the press in the context of untrammeled authority, to call new forces to life at every turn and set them on firm legal foundations, to put a repressed and humiliated society on its feet and to give at the chance to flex its muscles.

Chicherin published the Regional Administration of 17th-century Russia in 1856, followed by the treatise On Popular Representation 10 years later. Chicherin's mature works, imbued with Hegel's thought as they were, advocated the constitutional monarchy as an ideal form of government for Russia.

In 1868, Chicherin resigned his position at the university as a protest against government repressions and settled in his estate near Tambov. It was here that he wrote several volumes of his bulky History of Political Theories. Its magnificent literary style was acclaimed by such masters as Ivan Turgenev and Leo Tolstoy.

Later, Chicherin returned to Moscow, where he was elected the city mayor in 1882. At that period, he supported Alexander's harsh measures in Poland and the tsar's struggle against radical revolutionaries. His speech at Alexander III's coronation in the Kremlin was interpreted as too liberal, however, and he was forced to resign. He spent his last years writing 4 volumes of memoirs and some books on chemistry, zoology, and geometry. The memoirs have been reprinted by Oriental Research Partners (Newtonville, MA) in 1974 with a new introduction on Chicherin's life by Prof. D. Hammer, Indiana University.

The revolutionary Georgy Chicherin, later Soviet Foreign Minister, was Boris Chicherin's nephew.

== See also ==
- List of Russian legal historians
