= Andrei Uvarov =

Russian footballer

Personal information
- Full name: Andrei Vladimirovich Uvarov
- Date of birth: 14 April 1971 (age 55)
- Place of birth: Neklinovsky District, Russian SFSR
- Height: 1.80 m (5 ft 11 in)
- Positions: Defender; midfielder

Senior career*
Years	Team	Apps	(Gls)
1989	FC Torpedo Taganrog	13	(0)
1990–1991	FC SKA Rostov-on-Don	10	(0)
1991	FC SKA-2 Rostov-on-Don		
1992–1993	FC Torpedo Taganrog	34	(2)
1993	FC Shakhtyor Shakhty	14	(0)
1994	FC Krylia Sovetov Samara	4	(0)
1997	FC Kolos Pokrovskoye (amateur)		
1997–1998	FC Druzhba Maykop	52	(0)
- * Club domestic league appearances and goals

Andrei Vladimirovich Uvarov (Russian: Андрей Владимирович Уваров; born 14 April 1971) is a former Russian football player.
