= Dmitry Lavrinenko =

Soviet tank commander (1914–1941)

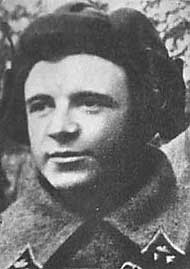
- Born: 10 September 1914; Besstrashnaya, Kuban Oblast, Russian Empire
- Died: 18 December 1941 (aged 27)
- Military career
- Allegiance: Red Army
- Service years: 1938–1941
- Rank: Senior Lieutenant
- Units: 1st Guards Tank Brigade, 15th Armored Division
- Awards: Hero of the Soviet Union; Order of Lenin (2)
- Other work: Teacher, statistician, cashier

Dmitry Fyodorovich Lavrinenko (Russian: Дмитрий Фёдорович Лавриненко; 10 September 1914 – December 18, 1941) was a Soviet tank ace and Hero of the Soviet Union. With 58 tank kills, he was the highest scoring tank commander of the Allies during World War II.

== Biography ==
A descendant of Kuban Cossacks, Lavrinenko finished his training at Ulyanovsk Tank Academy in May 1938. He took part in Soviet campaigns in Poland in 1939 and Bessarabia in 1940.

In 1941, he commanded the new T-34/76 tank. With 58 tanks and self-propelled guns eliminated in 1941 during Operation Barbarossa on the Eastern Front of World War II, he is considered to be one of the top Soviet tank aces of the war, despite his early death in 1941. He achieved such impressive results by taking advantage of the abilities of the T-34. The tank's armor and great mobility were clearly taken into consideration by Lavrinenko.

On December 18, 1941, Lavrinenko was killed just after freeing the village of Goryuny and knocking out his 52nd tank. Immediately after the action the Germans began shelling the village intensively. Lavrinenko got out of his T-34 near the village and tried to reach the commander of the 17th Armoured Brigade, Lt Col N. Chernoyarov, in order to report his victory but he was killed by a German mortar shell fragment.

Lavrinenko participated in 28 engagements in 2.5 months and has 52 confirmed kills. No Allied tank officer surpassed him during the whole war.

For his heroism, he was awarded the Order of Lenin on December 22, 1941. After the war Marshal Mikhail Katukov along with other high generals petitioned to give Lavrinenko Hero of the Soviet Union, yet he would not receive the highest award for another half a century. On May 5, 1990, Lavrinenko was posthumously awarded the title of Hero of the Soviet Union.

== See also ==
- Mikhail Katukov
- Semyon Krivoshein
- Galiy Adilbekov
- Pavel Rotmistrov
- Mikhail Panov
- Georgy Zhukov
- Vasily Chuikov
- Konstantin Rokossovsky
- Ivan Konev
- Pavel Belov
- Lev Dovator
- Ivan Panfilov
