= St. Nicholas' Church (Nikolaevka, Rostov Oblast) =

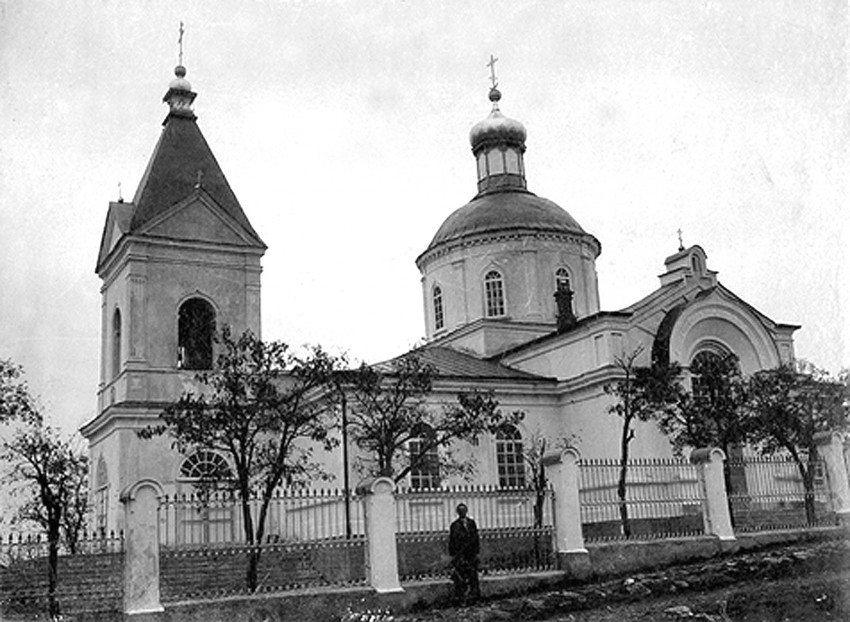
- Photo of the church taken at the beginning of the 20th-century

Religion
- Affiliation: Russian Orthodox

Location
- Location: Nikolaevka, Neklinovsky District, Rostov Oblast, Russia
- Interactive map of St. Nicholas' Church
- Coordinates: 47°19′06″N 38°49′57″E

Architecture
- Completed: 1850

St. Nicholas' Church (Russian: Церковь Николая Чудотворца) is a Russian Orthodox church in the village of Nikolaevka, Neklinovsky District, Rostov Oblast, Russia, within the Diocese of Rostov and Novocherkassk. Dedicated to Saint Nicholas, it was built in the mid-19th century.

== Earlier church buildings ==
The first church in Nikolevka was built of wood in 1782 and burnt down in 1878 for unknown reasons. A new one, consecrated in honor of the Transfiguration of Jesus, was then built on the site from logs of the old Church of Archangel Michael of the Taganrog Fortress.

== History ==
Around 1850, a stone church was constructed with two chapels, one is consecrated in honor of the Transfiguration of Jesus, and the other in honor of Saints Cosmas and Damian.

Under Soviet rule, authorities made repeated attempts to close the church. It is known that the priest of the temple Gregory Kalinowski was executed on charges of violating the "Decree on the separation of church and state and school from church."

During the German occupation during World War II, Soviet prisoners of war were placed in the church building. Retreating Nazis herded them into the basement and executed them with grenades. The church building suffered as a result and in the bell tower there is still a disarmed bomb.

In 1950, during the anti-religious campaign of Nikita Khrushchev, the church was closed and looted. Its premises were used first as a sports hall, then as a granary and for storage of chemicals.

A restoration of the church was undertaken in 1989, and a Sunday school has since been arranged there.
