= Uzkoye =

Coordinates: 55°37.40′N 37°32.34′E

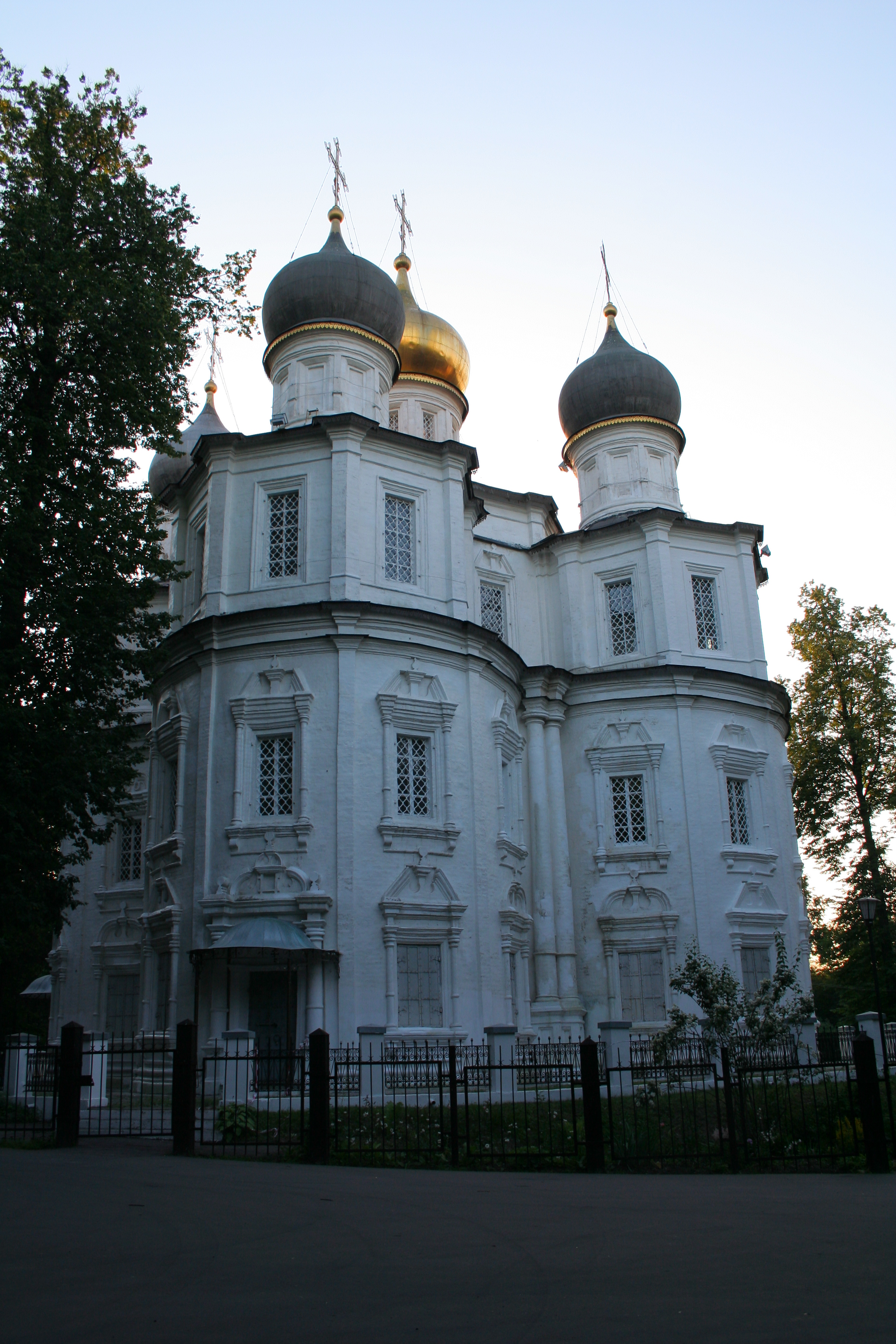
Church of the Theotokos of Kazan (1698-1704)

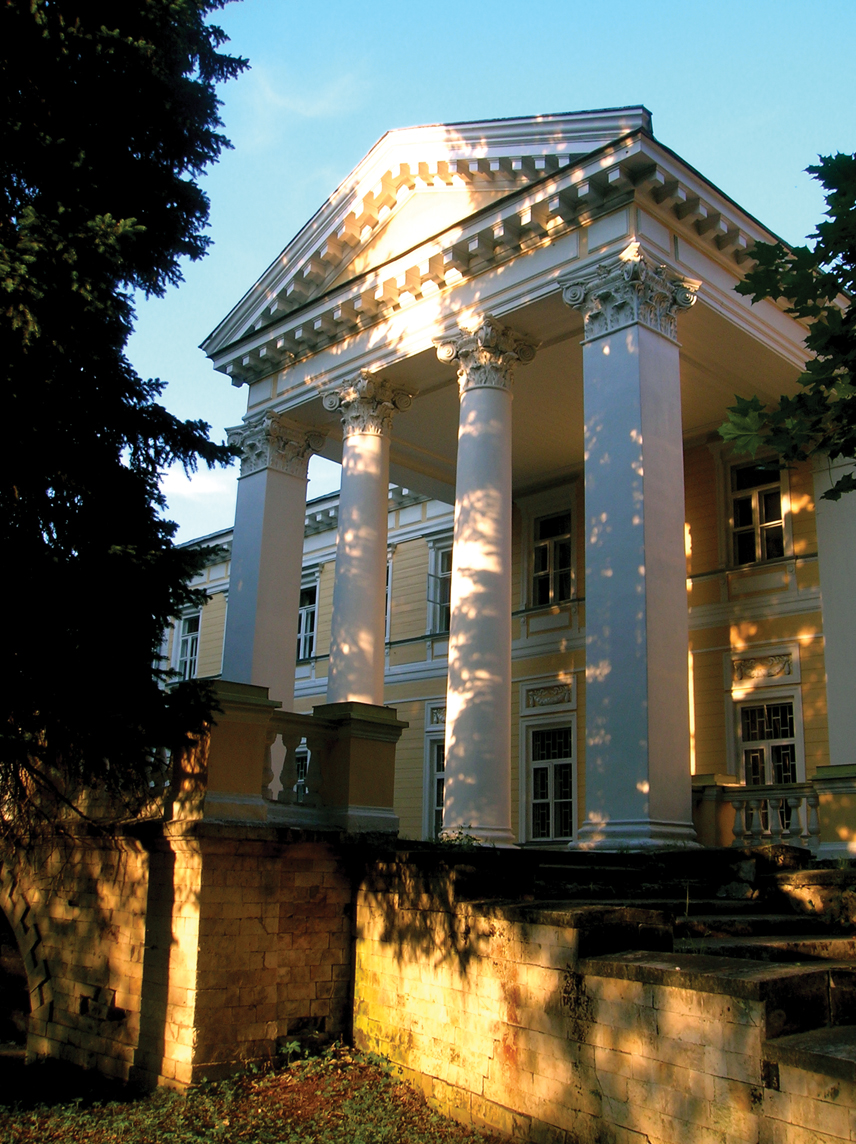
The manor house (1880s)

Uzkoe (Russian: Узкое) is a historic estate in the southwestern part of Moscow. Before 1629, the area belonged to Prince Gagarin, then it passed to Maksim Streshnev, a cousin of Tsarina Eudoxia Streshneva.

Upon the death of Maksim's grandson in 1692, the ownership passed sideways to a cousin, Tikhon Streshnev. It was he who commissioned a singular five-domed church to be built there in 1698-1704. Its four-petaled plan was of Ukrainian Baroque inspiration; but all five towers are equal in height and crowned by typical Russian onion domes. This five-towered church, dedicated to the Theotokos of Kazan, is quite extraordinary in Russian architecture. Its design is attributed to Osip Startsev, who was responsible for some of the major Baroque cathedrals of Kyiv but also worked in Moscow.

Tikhon's granddaughter Sophie was the last of her race; she married Prince Galitzine, whose son Alexis built a Baroque residence flanked by two wings. Alexis also built a regular park on the grounds and laid out a series of ponds. His daughter Marie was wife of Count Pyotr Aleksandrovich Tolstoy, who received Uzkoe as a dowry and had a larch alley planted there. In the mid-19th century the estate passed through marriage to the Troubetzkoys who had the old country house swept away and replaced with a Neoclassical mansion, which borrowed many details from its predecessor. It was there that the Russian philosopher Vladimir Solovyov died in 1900.

== Academy of Sciences sanatorium ==
After the Russian Revolution of 1917, the Troubetzkoys were expelled from Uzkoe and their estate was given over to the Soviet Academy of Sciences, which has used it as a sanatorium for its members. Ski treks of Uzkoe were popular with Lev Landau, while Andrei Kolmogorov liked swimming in the local ponds. The church had been stripped of its 17th-century icon screen (its whereabouts are still unknown) and until 1995 it housed libraries which were looted in Nazi Germany by the Red Army. In 1995 it reverted to the Russian Orthodox Church.
