= Nikolai Bobrovnikov =

Soviet politician

- Николай Бобровников

Mayor of Moscow
- In office 2 February 1956 – 2 September 1961
- Preceded by: Mikhail Yasnov
- Succeeded by: Nikolai Dygai

Personal details
- Born: 1 December 1909 Ryazhsk, Ryazan Governorate, Russian Empire
- Died: 13 February 1991 (aged 81) Moscow, Russia
- Resting place: Vagankovskoye Cemetery
- Party: CPSU
- Education: Moscow Civil Engineering Institute
- Awards: Order of Lenin; Order of the October Revolution; Order of the Patriotic War; Order of the Red Banner of Labour; Order of the Red Star

Nikolai Ivanovich Bobrovnikov (Russian: Николай Иванович Бобровников); (December 1 (14), 1909, in Ryzhsk - February 13, 1991, Moscow) was a Soviet politician who served as member of the Central Committee of the Communist Party of the Soviet Union and Mayor of Moscow from 1956 to 1961.

== Biography ==
He was born in Ryazan Governorate. In 1925–1926 he worked as an unskilled laborer in the grain inspection department of the Ryazhsk elevator. In 1926–1927 he worked as a Track repair worker in the railway track service section of Ryazhsk. In 1927–1928 he was a worker at the Ryazhsk locomotive depot. In 1928–1932 he studied at the Moscow Civil Engineering Institute. 1932 he worked as an assistant to the head of the water purification shop at the Rublyovskaya water supply station in Moscow. In 1932–1934 he served as a Red Army soldier in the 56th Border Detachment, platoon commander in the cavalry regiment of the OGPU Internal Troops. In 1934–1939 he worked as a Deputy station chief, head of the water purification shop, chief engineer of the Rublyovskaya water supply station. In 1939–1947 he served as Head of the Eastern water supply station in Moscow.

from 1947 to 1949 he served as Chief Engineer, Deputy Head, Head of the Water Supply and Sewerage Department of the Moscow City Executive Committee. In 1949–1950 he served as Deputy Chairman of the Moscow City Executive Committee. In 1950–1956 he served as First Deputy Chairman of the Moscow City Executive Committee.

In 1956–1961 he served as Chairman of the Moscow City Executive Committee of the Moscow City Council, the Mayor of Moscow. In 1961–1963 he served as Deputy Chairman of the State Scientific and Economic Council of the Council of Ministers of the USSR. In 1963–1981 he served as Head of the Department of Housing, Public Utilities, and Urban Development of the USSR State Planning Committee. In 1981–1983 he served as Head of the Department of Housing, Public Utilities, and Urban Development of the USSR State Planning Committee.

Since November 1983 he was Personal Pensioner of Union Significance.

He served as a deputy to the Supreme Soviet of the Soviet Union of the 5th convocation and as a member of the CPSU Central Committee from 1956 to 1961.

He died in February 1991 and is buried at the Vagankovskoye Cemetery.
