= Valery Saykin =

Russian politician (1937–2024)

- Валерий Сайкин
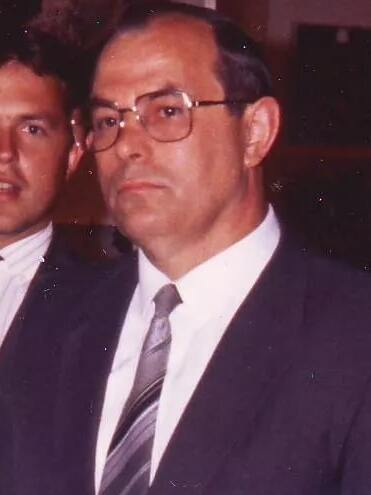
- Saykin in 1989

Member of the State Duma
- In office 18 January 2000 – 29 December 2003

Chairman of the Executive Committee of the Moscow Council of People's Deputies
- In office 3 January 1986 – 14 April 1990
- Preceded by: Vladimir Promyslov
- Succeeded by: Yury Luzhkov

Personal details
- Born: Valery Timofeyevich Saykin; 3 August 1937 Moscow, Russian SFSR, USSR
- Died: 8 June 2024 (aged 86) Moscow, Russia
- Party: CPSU; CPRF
- Education: All-Union Correspondence Mechanical Engineering Institute
- Occupation: Engineer

Valery Timofeyevich Saykin (Russian: Вале́рий Тимофе́евич Са́йкин; 3 August 1937 – 8 June 2024) was a Russian politician. A member of the Communist Party of the Soviet Union and later the Communist Party of the Russian Federation, he served as Chairman of the Executive Committee of the Moscow Council of People's Deputies from 1986 to 1990 and served in the State Duma from 2000 to 2003.

He was awarded Order of Friendship of Peoples (1993) and Order of Honour (2007).

Saykin died in Moscow on 8 June 2024, at the age of 86.
