= Tikhon Streshnev =

Russian boyar and statesman

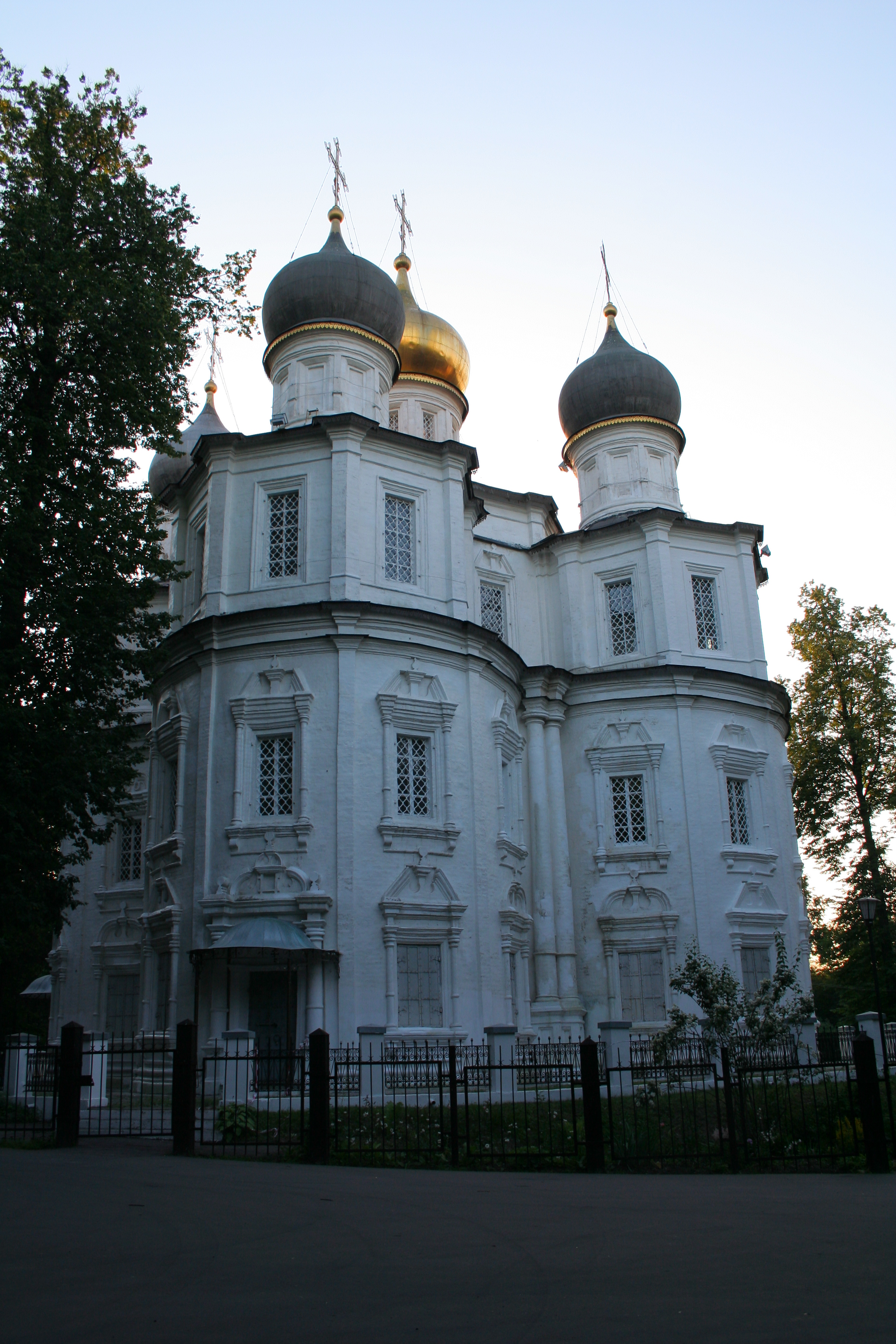
A church built by Streshnev in Uzkoye

Tikhon Nikitich Streshnev (Russian: Тихон Никитич Стрешнев; 1649 – 15 January 1719, in St Petersburg) was a Russian boyar and statesman during the reign of Peter I of Russia, one of the first members of the Governing Senate and the first governor of Moscow after the post was reformed by Peter. Several noted historians have suggested—citing the extreme height of both Peter and Tikhon—that Streshnev was the czar's actual, biological father.

== Biography ==
Tikhon Streshnev was the son of boyar Nikita Streshnev, who was a distant relative of Eudoxia Streshneva and voevoda in Yefremov and Vologda.

In 1666 Streshnev was a solicitor, in 1668 he became a stolnik. Together with his uncle, boyar Rodion Streshnev, he mentored the young tsar, Peter I. After his accession to the throne in 1682, Streshnev's influence grew considerably. The day after the coronation, he received the rank of okolnichiy and in 1688 that of boyar. In 1690 Streshnev became as the head of the Razryadny prikaz the head of the military of Muscovy, although he never took part in the real military actions. To the period of his absence in 1697, Peter left to govern the state Prince Romodanovsky and Streshnev.

When in 1711 Governing Senate was established, Streshnev became one of its members. In 1718 he participated in the trial of Tsarevich Alexei and he was one of those, who signed to him the death verdict.
