= Sergei Tretyakov (arts patron) =

Russian philanthropist and patron of the arts

- Сергей Третьяков
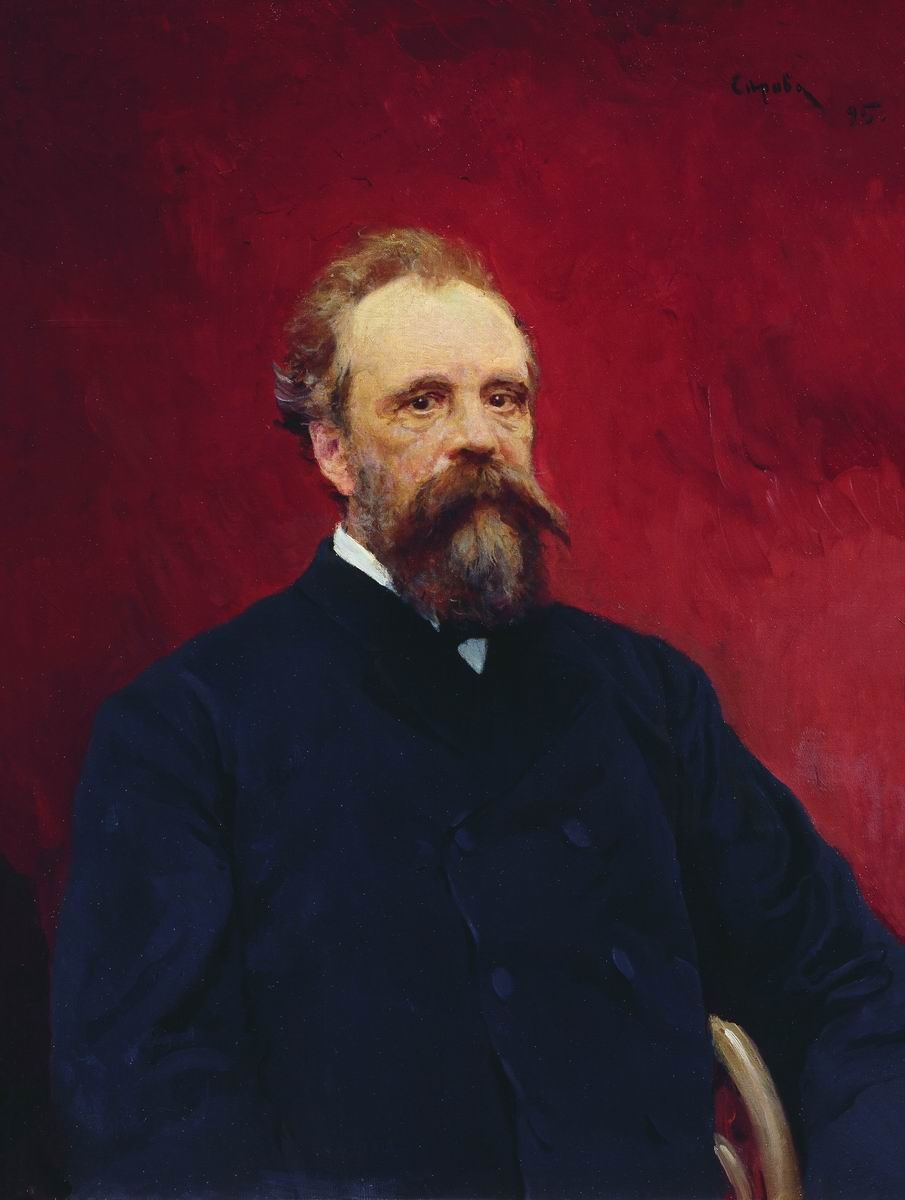
- Posthumous portrait by Valentin Serov, 1895

Moscow's Gorodskoy Golova (Московский городской голова)
- In office 1877–1881

Personal details
- Born: 1834
- Died: July 25, 1892 (aged 57–58)
- Resting place: Novodevichy Cemetery, Moscow

Sergei Mikhailovich Tretyakov (Russian: Сергей Михайлович Третьяков; 1834 – 25 July 1892) was a Russian philanthropist and patron of the arts, who co-founded the Tretyakov Gallery in Moscow with his brother Pavel Tretyakov.

== Tretyakov Gallery ==
In 1851, Tretyakov and his brother Pavel Tretyakov acquired a property on the right bank of the Moskva River to use as offices, also using the building to house their art collection, which became known as the Tretyakov Gallery. Sergei's collection was smaller than his brother's, but also very valuable. The first work to be added to his collection was Alexey Bogolyubov's Ipatievsky Monastery near Kostroma. He later began collecting primarily works from Western masters, especially French.

On Sergei's death in 1892, both brothers' collections were donated to the Moscow city administrators. The brothers' combined collections consisted of 1,287 paintings, 518 drawings and 9 sculptures by Russian artists, along with 75 paintings and eight drawings by European artists, mainly French and German masters of the late 19th century. The value of the donated collections was estimated at 1,429,000 roubles. The city converted the brothers' private showroom into a gallery accessible to the public, free of charge. The official opening of the Moscow City Gallery of Pavel and Sergei Tretyakov, as it was then named, took place on 15 August 1893, with over 700 visitors on the first day.

== Other activities ==
He was also the chief of the Moscow municipal administration, from 1876 to 1882.
