= Pokrovskoye, Rostov Oblast =

Pokrovskoye Покровское Does not Exist
- Rural locality
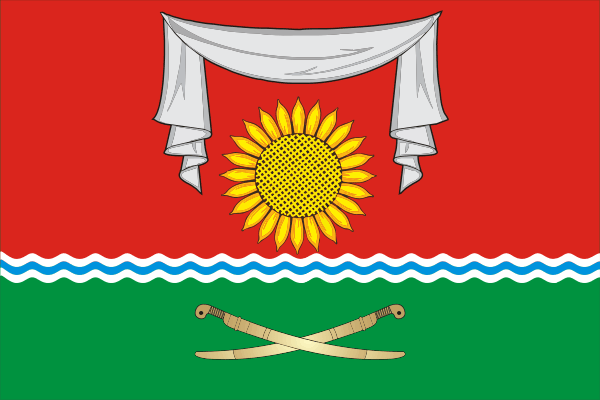
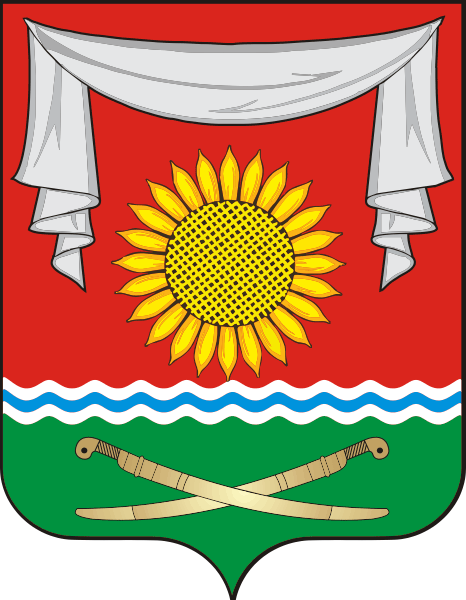
- Flag Coat of arms
- Interactive map of Pokrovskoye
- Location of Pokrovskoye Pokrovskoye (Rostov Oblast)
- Coordinates: 47°24′59″N 38°53′56″E
- Country: Russia
- Federal subject: Rostov Oblast
- Administrative district: Neklinovsky District
- Founded: 1769
- Elevation: 62 m (203 ft)

Population (2010 Census)
  - Total: 12,369
  - Estimate (2021): 11,842 (−4.3%)
- Time zone: UTC+3 (MSK)
- Postal codes: 346830, 346831
- OKTMO ID: 60636448101

Pokrovskoye (Russian: Покровское) is a village, it is an administrative center of the Neklinovsky District of Rostov Oblast in Russia. It is also an administrative center of the rural population of Pokrovskoye. Its population is 12369 as of 2010.

== History ==
It was founded in 1769.

The first record about the community, where the village Pokrovskoye is placed now, was made in 1769. A Ukrainian historian Dmytro Yavornytsky (pen name: Evarnitsky) mentions in his “History of the Zaporozhian Cossacks:"

“В урочище устья реки Миус, при впадении в Азовское море, близ Таганрога, в теперешней слободе Неклиновке Ростовского уезда в 1769 г. 500 душ семейного запорожского казачества по распоряжению Коша основали три слободы: Николаевскую, Троицкую и Покровскую…”

Translation:

“In the balk of the river Mius, near the inflow into the Sea of Azov, near Taganrog, in today's sloboda of the Neklinovsky Rostov uyezd in the year 1769, 500 inner man of the family of the Zaporozhian cossacks following the order of Kosh have built three slobodas: Nikolaevka, Troizkoye and Pokrovskoye…”

In the year 1915 in Pokrovskoye existed 1410 yards, in the bylaw of the peasant citizens were standing 12400 dessiatins (approx. 136 km^{2}) of land.

== Geography ==
The village lies along the river Mius, 3 kilometers south-west to the railroad station Neklinovka. The distance to the city Taganrog adds up to 20 kilometers, to the city Rostov-on-Don it adds up to 65 kilometers.

== Economy ==
=== Industry ===
Milk factory, meat workshop, brick factory, agricultural enterprises are present. There are deposits of clay, sand, gas etc.

=== Agriculture ===
In the region corn, barley, maize, sunflower, vegetables and fruits are being grown. Cattle, pigs and birds are being bred.

=== Transportation ===
The village is connected with the city Taganrog and Rostov-on-Don by the rail road and bus trafficking. There are also transit busses which stop in Pokrovskoye on their ways to Donetsk, Ilovaisk and Khartsyzk.

Some route busses, the schedule of which is adapted to the departures and arrivals of the trains of the sector “Uspenskaya - Taganrog”, circulate through the village.
