= Kolomensky Uyezd =

Kolomensky Uyezd (Коломенский уезд) was one of the subdivisions of the Moscow Governorate of the Russian Empire. It was situated in the southeastern part of the governorate. Its administrative centre was Kolomna.

== Demographics ==
At the time of the Russian Empire Census of 1897, Kolomensky Uyezd had a population of 111,927. Of these, 99.2% spoke Russian, 0.2% Polish, 0.2% German, 0.1% Romani, 0.1% Yiddish and 0.1% Ukrainian as their native language.

== Notable residents ==
- Mikhail Katukov (1900–1976), Red Army commander born in the village of Bolshoe Uvarovo
