= Romodanovsky family =

Russian noble family

Princely arms of the family

The House of Romodanovsky (Russian: Ромодановские) was a Russian noble family descending from sovereign rulers of Starodub-on-the-Klyazma. Their progenitor was Prince Vasily Fyodorovich Starodubsky (Василий Фёдорович Стародубский) who changed his name to Romodanovsky after his votchina (estate) of Romodanovo. They claimed descent from the Rurikids. Although the family was one of the first Rurikids to enter the service of the prince of Moscow, it was in the 17th century that they finally rose to the highest ranks of Muscovite Russia.

== Early members ==
Among Vasily's sons, one was Ivan III's okolnichi, another sat in the Boyar Duma during Vasily III's reign. Their nephew was sent by Ivan the Terrible as a Russian ambassador to Copenhagen. The latter's nephew, Prince Ivan Petrovich Romodanovsky, was killed by the Kalmucks on his way from Persia in 1607.
