= 3rd State Duma =

Convocation of the lower house of Russian parliament

(Russia) State Duma of the Federal Assembly of the Russian Federation at the 3rd convocation
←	2nd State Duma	4th State Duma	→
- Seat composition of the 3rd State Duma

Overview
- Meeting place: State Duma Building; Moscow, 1 Okhotny Ryad street
- Term: 18 January 2000 – 29 December 2003
- Election: 19 December 1999
- Government: 28 committees
- Website: State Duma
- Members: 450
- Chairman: Gennadiy Seleznyov (from Communist Party)
- Party control: 1st coalition: Unity and Communist Party; 2nd coalition: Unity and Fatherland – All Russia

The State Duma of the Federal Assembly of the Russian Federation of the 3rd convocation (Russian: Государственная Дума Федерального Собрания Российской Федерации III созыва) is a former convocation of the legislative branch of the State Duma, lower house of the Russian Parliament, elected on 19 December 1999. The 3rd convocation met at the State Duma building in Moscow from 18 January 2000, to 29 December 2003.

== Leadership ==
Until the election of the Chairman of the State Duma of the meeting, the position was filled by the oldest deputy – 79 year-old of Yegor Ligachev – according to traditions.

On 18 January 2000, the parliament elected Gennadiy Seleznyov as the Chairman of the State Duma.

== List of deputies ==
List of deputies

Communist Party

- Dmitry Abramenkov
- Zhores Alferov
- Igor Annensky
- Alevtina Aparina
- Nikolay Arefiev
- Tatyana Astrakhankina
- Sergey Afanasyev
- Nikolai Benediktov
- Nikolai Bindyukov
- Vyacheslav Boyko
- Sergey Budazhapov
- Yuri Burlutsky
- Vladimir Volkov
- Zoya Vorontsova
- Gennady Gamza
- Hapisat Gamzatova
- Sergey Glazyev
- Svetlana Goryacheva
- Ruslan Gostev
- Vladimir Grishukov
- Nikolai Gubenko
- Nicolai Daikhes
- Yelena Drapeko
- Ivan Zhdakaev
- Ivan Zakharov
- Victor Zorkaltsev
- Vyacheslav Zorkin
- Gennady Zyuganov
- Nikolay Ivanov
- Leonid Ivanchenko
- Viktor Ilyukhin
- Vladimir Kadochnikov
- Vladimir Kazakovtsev
- Vladimir Kalyagin
- Boris Kibirev
- Vasily Kislitsyn
- Valentin Knysh
- Victor Kolomeitsev
- Nikolay Kolomeitsev
- Nadezhda Korneeva
- Evgeny Kosterin
- Georgy Kostin
- Alexander Kravets
- Alexander Kruglikov
- Alexander Kuvaev
- Alexander Kulikov
- Valentin Kuptsov
- Alexander Labeikin
- Sergey Levchenko
- Yegor Ligachyov
- Anatoly Lukyanov
- Leonid Mayevsky
- Yuri Maslyukov
- Ivan Melnikov
- Alexander Mikhailov
- Valentin Nikitin
- Vladimir Nikitin
- Ivan Nikitchuk
- Yuri Nikiforenko
- Nina Ostanina
- Viktor Pautov
- Vladimir Pashuto
- Viktor Peshkov
- Tamara Pletnyova
- Sergey Potapov
- Valery Rashkin
- Sergey Reshulsky
- Pyotr Rogonov
- Igor Rodionov
- Valentin Romanov
- Pyotr Romanov
- Svetlana Savitskaya
- Valery Saykin
- Alexander Saliy
- Nikolai Sapozhnikov
- Ashot Sargsyan
- Vitaly Safronov
- Vitaly Sevastyanov
- Gennadiy Seleznyov
- Svyatoslav Sokol
- Gherman Titov
- Vladimir Tikhonov
- Vladimir Toporkov
- Gennady Khodyrev
- Ivan Khudyakov
- Vladimir Chertischev
- Anatoly Chekhoev
- Valentin Chikin
- Aleksandr Shabanov
- Vasily Shandybin
- Lyubov Shvets
- Aleksandr Shvetsov
- Alexander Shulga
- Valentin Shurchanov
- Vladislav Yurchik

Liberal Democratic Party

- Konstantin Vetrov
- Alexey Guzanov
- Vladislav Dyomin
- Ashot Egiazaryan
- Vladimir Zhirinovsky
- Vladislav Ignatov
- Suleyman Kerimov
- Alexander Klyukin
- Igor Lebedev
- Yuri Mamonov
- Aleksey Mitrofanov
- Mikhail Musatov
- Alexander Novikov
- Vladimir Semenkov
- Leonid Slutsky
- Yegor Solomatin
- Oleg Finko

Unity

- Alexey Alekseyev
- Kurban-Ali Amirov
- Pavel Anokhin
- Sergey Apatenko
- Alexander Barannikov
- Alexander Bezdolny
- Leonid Belyaev
- Aleksandr Belyakov
- Ahmed Bilalov
- Kaadyr-ool Bicheldey
- Victor Borodai
- Nikolay Botka
- Alexandra Burataeva
- Vladimir Bykov
- Vasily Volkovsky
- Vladimir Vshivtsev
- Evgeniy Galichanin
- Svetlana Gvozdeva
- Vladimir Grachev
- Boris Gryzlov
- Alexander Gurov
- Sait-Salam Gutseriev
- Igor Dines
- Elvira Ermakova
- Sergey Zhitinkin
- Nikolay Zalepukhin
- Boris Zubitsky
- Ivan Ivlev
- Aleksandr Karelin
- Vladimir Karetnikov
- Vladimir Katrenko
- Vladimir Klimov
- Frants Klintsevich
- Oleg Kovalyov
- Pavel Kovalenko
- Alexander Koval
- Bashir Kodzoev
- Valery Komissarov
- Vladimir Koptev-Dvornikov
- Maxim Korobov
- Alexander Kosarikov
- Vasily Kuznetsov
- Vitaly Lednik
- Sergey Lobov
- Nikolai Loktionov
- Vladimir Lushin
- Boris Martynov
- Abdul-Vahed Niyazov
- Alexey Ogonkov
- Yuri Petrov
- Vladimir Pekhtin
- Victor Pleskachevsky
- Vitaly Predybailov
- Vladislav Reznik
- Yuri Rodionov
- Antonina Romanchuk
- Peter Rubezhansky
- Vladimir Ryzhkov
- Gadzhimet Safaraliev
- Vladimir Semenov
- Lyubov Sliska
- Anatoly Sobolev
- Nikolai Sorokin
- Vladimir Sokhov
- Galina Strelchenko
- Sergey Strelchenko
- Nikolai Tabachkov
- Vladimir Tarachev
- Vasily Teterin
- Alexey Tomov
- Oleg Utkin
- Alexander Fedulov
- Ram Khramov
- Yuri Tsybakin
- Vasily Cheryomushkin
- Viktor Chernomyrdin

Fatherland – All Russia

- Nadezhda Azarova
- Aleksey Aleksandrov
- Zainulla Bagishaev
- Rim Bakiev
- Georgy Boos
- Nikolay Bulaev
- Maxim Vasilyev
- Alexander Vladislavlev
- Vyacheslav Volodin
- Farida Gaynullina
- Magomedkadi Gasanov
- Stanislav Govorukhin
- Valery Grebennikov
- Viktor Grishin
- Boris Gromov
- Vitaly Gudkov
- Vladimir Gusenkov
- Valery Draganov
- Vladimir Dubov
- Mikhail Zalikhanov
- Andrey Isayev
- Nikolay Kovalyov
- Andrey Kokoshin
- Yelena Kondakova
- Konstantin Kosachev
- Valery Kryukov
- Viktor Kulikov
- Ekaterina Lakhova
- Yuri Lipatov
- Igor Lisinenko
- Vladimir Litvinov
- Valentin Luntsevich
- Pavel Medvedev
- Viktor Opekunov
- Boris Pastukhov
- Evgeny Primakov
- Valery Ryazansky
- Bato Semenov
- Viktor Semenov
- Alexander Sizov
- Anatoly Tyazhlov
- Nikolai Chuprina
- Sergey Shirokov
- Sergey Shokhin

Union of Right Forces

- Margarita Barzhanova
- Vadim Bondar
- Nikolai Brusnikin
- Eduard Vorobyov
- Yegor Gaidar
- Sergey Generalov
- Lyubov Glebova
- Vladimir Golovlev
- Sergei Kiriyenko
- Sergey Kovalev
- Pavel Krasheninnikov
- Yury Kurin
- Vera Lekareva
- Alexey Likhachev
- Gasan Mirzoev
- Artur Myaki
- Boris Nadezhdin
- Oleg Naumov
- Boris Nemtsov
- Victor Pokhmelkin
- Konstantin Remchukov
- Yuly Rybakov
- Dmitry Savelyev
- Andrey Selivanov
- Boris Titenko
- Grigory Tomchin
- Ivan Fedotkin
- Alexander Fomin
- Irina Khakamada
- Alexander Shimanov
- Alexander Shubin
- Vladimir Yuzhakov
- Sergey Yushenkov
- Lev Yarkin

Yabloko

- Alexei Arbatov
- Igor Artemyev
- Mikhail Yemelyanov
- Mikhail Zadornov
- Sergey Ivanenko
- Vyacheslav Igrunov
- Victor Kushchenko
- Vladimir Lukin
- Alexey Melnikov
- Yelena Mizulina
- Sergey Mitrokhin
- Alexey Mikhailov
- Valery Ostanin
- Sergey Popov
- Sergei Stepashin
- Nikolay Travkin
- Peter Shelishch
- Alexander Shishlov
- Yuri Shchekochikhin
- Grigory Yavlinsky
- Tatiana Yarygina

Regions of Russia

- Khalil Barlybaev
- Nikolai Bezborodov
- Mikhail Bugera
- Vladimir Butkeev
- Ragib Gimaev
- Vladimir Grebenyuk
- Anatoly Greshnevikov
- Alexander Zhukov
- Konstantin Zaitsev
- Evgeny Zelenov
- Flyura Ziyatdinova
- Valentina Ivanova
- Vladimir Catalnikov
- Andrey Klimov
- Joseph Kobzon
- Alexander Lotorev
- Vladimir Lysenko
- Georgy Maitakov
- Valery Malyshev
- Vladimir Medvedev
- Yury Medvedev
- Oleg Morozov
- Robert Nigmatullin
- Vladimir Nikitin
- Alexander Piskunov
- Mikhail Rokitsky
- Valentina Savostyanova
- Franis Saifullin
- Fandas Safiullin
- Georgy Tikhonov
- Midkhat Khakimov
- Nail Khusnutdinov
- Alexander Chershintsev
- Alexander Chetverikov
- Sergey Chikulaev
- Artur Chilingarov
- Martin Shakkum
- Nikolay Shaklein
- Yaroslav Shvyryaev
- Vitaly Shuba

Agro-industrial deputy group

- Ivan Aparin
- Anatoly Artemyev
- Alexander Afanasiev
- Pavel Burdukov
- Alexander Burulko
- Aleksandr Gamanenko
- Anatoly Golubkov
- Alexander Davydov
- Boris Danchenko
- Sergey Zolototilin
- Vasily Iver
- Igor Igoshin
- Ivan Kazankov
- Nikolai Kiselyov
- Nikolai Kosterin
- Mikhail Lapshin
- Oleg Mashchenko
- Ivan Meshcherin
- Anatoly Nikitin
- Vyacheslav Olenyev
- Nikolay Olshansky
- Vladimir Plotnikov
- Alexey Ponomarev
- Sergey Proschin
- Pyotr Svechnikov
- Grigory Senin
- Oleg Smolin
- Dmitry Soldatkin
- Alexander Tkachov
- Nikolay Kharitonov
- Anatoly Chekis
- Gennady Churkin
- Valery Shituev
- Sergey Shtogrin
- Vitaliy Aleksandrovich Yuzhilin

People's Deputies

- Vladimir Averchenko
- Anatoly Aksakov
- Salimkhan Akhmetkhanov
- Vitaly Basygysov
- Alexander Belousov
- Vladimir Bryntsalov
- Vadim Bulavinov
- Alexander Vereteno
- Viktor Voitenko
- Valery Vorotnikov
- Vasily Galushkin
- Valery Galchenko
- Nikolai Gerasimenko
- Rafael Gimalov
- Ivan Grachev
- Mikhail Grishankov
- Oksana Dmitriyeva
- Gennady Druzhinin
- Sergey Zagidullin
- Valery Zubov
- Anatoly Ivanov
- Evgeny Ishchenko
- Sergey Kolesnikov
- Yury Konev
- Oleg Korgunov
- Leonid Korotkov
- Valery Kuzin
- Georgy Leontiev
- Gennady Luzin
- Valery Markov
- Gadzhi Makhachev
- Vladimir Mokryi
- Zelimkhan Mutsoev
- Sergey Neverov
- Andrey Nikolaev
- Gadzhimurad Omarov
- Alexander Orgolainen
- Vadim Orlov
- Vladimir Pevtsov
- Vladimir Pekarev
- Valentina Pivnenko
- Nikolai Piskun
- Alexander Podgursky
- Adrian Puzanovsky
- Gennady Raikov
- Boris Reznik
- Dmitry Rogozin
- Svetlana Smirnova
- Nikolay Sukhoy
- Yury Ten
- Viktor Topilin
- Igor Khankoev
- Valentin Chaika
- Sergey Shashurin
- Sergey Shishkarev
- Alexander Shokhin
- Vyacheslav Shport
- Mikhail Yurevich

Outside of factions and groups

- Roman Abramovich
- Viktor Alksnis
- Aslambek Aslakhanov
- Arkady Baskaev
- Boris Berezovsky
- Valery Gartung
- Mikhail Gutseriev
- Valery Dorogin
- Evgeny Zyablitsev
- Alexander Korzhakov
- Mikhail Kuznetsov
- Anatoly Kulikov
- Evgeny Marchenko
- Alexander Nevzorov
- Nikolai Ovchinnikov
- Vladimir Platov
- Igor Rudensky
- Nikolai Ryzhkov
- Alexander Ryazanov
- Konstantin Sevenard
- Gennady Semigin
- Andrei Skoch
- Viktor Cherepkov
- Rifkhat Shakirov
- Oleg Shein

== Factions ==
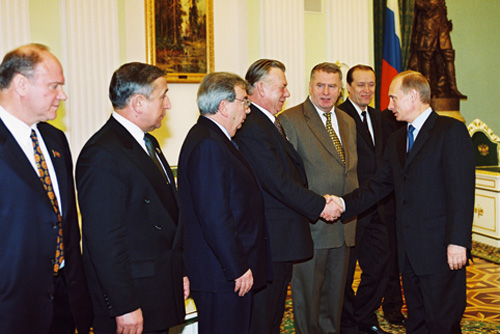
Leaders of the State Duma factions with Acting President Vladimir Putin, January 5, 2000

Faction	Leader	Seats
Communist Party of the Russian Federation	Gennady Zuganov	88
Unity	Boris Gryzlov	83
People's Deputy Group	Gennady Raikov	62
Fatherland – All Russia	Yevgeny Primakov (until 2001)	46
Fatherland – All Russia	Vyacheslav Volodin (from 2001)	46
Regions of Russia (Union of Independent Deputies)	Oleg Morozov	44
Agro-Industrial Group	Nikolay Kharitonov	42
Union of Right Forces	Sergey Kiriyenko (until 23 May 2000)	32
Union of Right Forces	Boris Nemtsov (from 23 May 2000)	32
Yabloko	Grigory Yavlinsky	19
Zhirinovsky Bloc	Igor Lebedev	16
Independents		14
Vacant		4

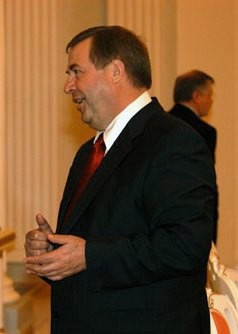
Gennadiy Seleznyov – Chairman of the State Duma for the 3rd convocation

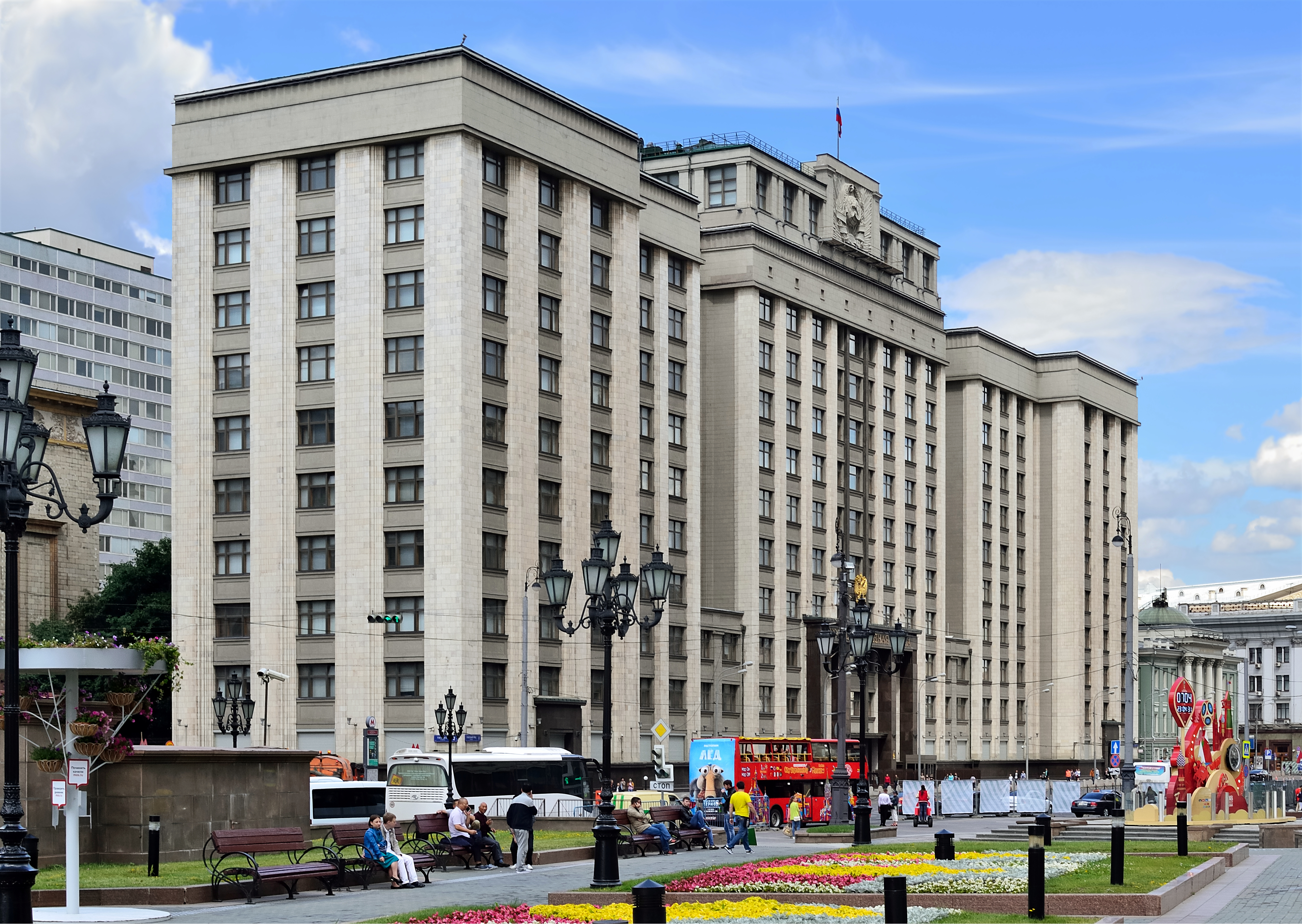
Modern building of the State Duma.

== Coalitions ==
In the State Duma at the 3rd convocation, two coalitions functioned at different times as the majority. In both cases, the coalitions were initiated by the "Unity" faction.

The first coalition was formed immediately after the announcement of election results, during the preparations for the first meeting of the new parliament. The "Unity" faction and the Communist Party (the largest in the State Duma) signed a package agreement, according to which they shared the top positions of the Duma and the chairmanships of parliamentary committees. As for "Unity" it was mainly to keep the levers of control of the State Duma from its main competitors at that time – "Fatherland-All Russia". The Communists made an agreement on favorable terms. Later, second coalition was formed, The so-called "Coalition of Four" which included Unity, Fatherland-All Russia, People's Deputy, and Russia's Regions, and comprised exactly half of the Duma. The latter two of these groups were not parties per se, but rather deputy groups formed in the Duma.

During the session, the parliament consolidated pro-government forces around President Vladimir Putin: the merger of public movements "Unity" and "Fatherland" was announced, which led to corresponding changes in the State Duma. In April 2002, the newly formed majority of the State Duma cleaned house and deprived the Communists of the benefits they received at the beginning. They were deprived of the majority of management positions. This caused a crisis within the Communist Party faction – Chairman of the State Duma Gennady Seleznyov, as well as heads of two committees (Svetlana Goryacheva and Nikolai Gubenko) chose to leave the faction, and to keep their positions.

== Major legislation ==
- May 17, 2000: Mikhail Kasyanov was approved as Prime Minister of Russia with 325 votes in favor.
- May 14, 2003: Ratification of the Russian-American Strategic Offensive Reductions Treaty with 294 votes in favor.

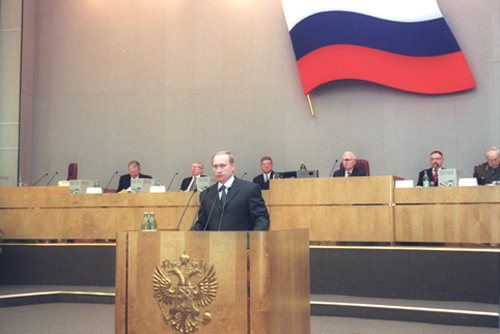
President Vladimir Putin in the State Duma, May 18, 2000

== Committees ==
28 committees operated in the State Duma at the 3rd convocation.

Committee	Chair	Faction
Law	Pavel Krasheninnikov	Union of Right Forces
State-Building	Anatoly Lukyanov	Communist Party
State-Building	Valery Grebennikov	Fatherland – All Russia
Labour and Social Policy	Valery Saykin	Communist Party
Labour and Social Policy	Andrey Selivanov	Union of Right Forces
Budget and Taxes	Alexander Zhukov	Regions of Russia
Credit Organizations and Financial Markets	Alexander Shokhin	People's Deputy
Economic Policy and Entrepreneurship	Sergey Glazyev	Communist Party
Property Issues	Vladimir Pekhtin	Unity
Property Issues	Viktor Pleskachevsky	Unity
Industry, Construction and High Technology	Yuri Maslyukov	Communist Party
Industry, Construction and High Technology	Martin Shakkum	Regions of Russia
Energy, Transport and Communications	Vladimir Katrenko	Unity
Defence	Andrey Nikolayev	People's Deputy
Security	Alexander Gurov	Unity
International Affairs	Dmitry Rogozin	People's Deputy
CIS Affairs and Relations with Compatriots	Boris Pastukhov	Fatherland – All Russia
CIS Affairs and Relations with Compatriots	Andrey Kokoshin	Fatherland – All Russia
Federation Affairs and Regional Policy	Leonid Ivanchenko	Communist Party
Federation Affairs and Regional Policy	Viktor Grishin	Fatherland – All Russia
Local Government	Vladimir Mokry	Unity
Rules and Organization of the State Duma	Nikolay Loktionov	Unity
Rules and Organization of the State Duma	Vasily Volkovsky	Unity
Information Policy	Konstantin Vetrov	Liberal Democratic Party
Health Protection and Sports	Nikolai Gerasimenko	People's Deputy
Education and Science	Ivan Melnikov	Communist Party
Education and Science	Alexander Shishlov	Yabloko
Women, Family and Children	Svetlana Goryacheva	Communist Party
Agrarian Issues	Vladimir Plotnikov	Agroindustrial Group
Agrarian Issues	Gennady Kulik	Fatherland – All Russia
Natural Resources and Land Use	Alexander Belyakov	Unity
Ecology	Vladimir Grachev	Unity
Public Associations and Religious Organizations	Viktor Zorkaltsev	Communist Party
Nationalities	Alexander Tkachov	Agroindustrial Group
Nationalities	Valentin Nikitin	Agroindustrial Group
Culture and Tourism	Nikolai Gubenko	Communist Party
North and Far East Issues	Valentina Pivnenko	People's Deputy
Veterans Affairs	Viktor Kulikov	Fatherland – All Russia
