= Shvetsov =

Shvetsov (Russian: Шевцов; feminine: Shvetsova) is a Russian-language surname derived either from the Russian word швец or from the Ukrainian term швець for "cobbler/shoemaker", literally meaning "child of tailor/cobbler". In Russian, the word shvets is also an obsolete term for for "tailor". Notable people with the surname include:

- Aleksandr Shvetsov, Russian footballer
- Alexander Shvetsov, Russian professional ice hockey player
- Aleksandr Shvetsov (politician)
- Arkady Shvetsov, Soviet aircraft engine designer
- Evgeny Shvetsov, (born 1988), Russian Paralympian track and field athlete
- Leonid Shvetsov, Russian long-distance runner
- Lyudmila Shvetsova, Russian stateswoman and politician
- Maksim Shvetsov, Russian football coach and a former player
- Sergei Shvetsov, Soviet football player
- Vasily Shvetsov, Soviet Army colonel general
- Vera Shvetsova, Russian ballet teacher and balletmaster
- Viktor Shvetsov, Ukrainian football referee
