= Aleksandr Shvetsov (disambiguation) =

- Aleksandr Shvetsov, Russian footballer
- Alexander Shvetsov, Russian professional ice hockey player
- Aleksandr Shvetsov (politician)
