= Nikolai Brykin =

Russian politician (born 1959)

Member of Parliament Nikolai Brykin
- Николай Брыкин
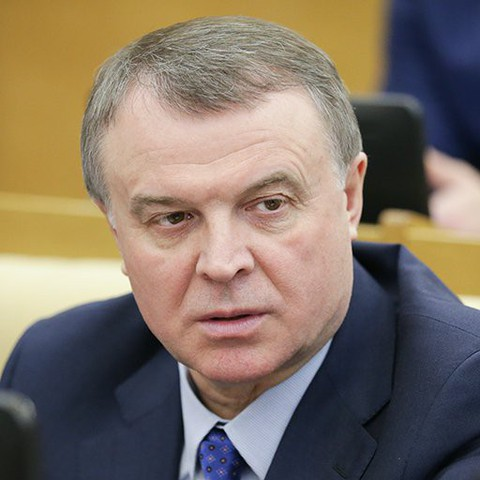

Member of the State Duma for Tyumen Oblast
- Incumbent
- Assumed office 12 October 2021
- Preceded by: Ernest Valeev
- Constituency: Tyumen (No. 185)

Member of the State Duma (Party List Seat)
- In office 5 October 2016 – 12 October 2021

Personal details
- Born: 25 November 1959 (age 66) Soldatskoye, Voronezh Oblast, Russian SFSR, Soviet Union
- Party: United Russia
- Education: Tyumen Higher School of the Ministry of Internal Affairs of the Russian Federation; Institute of Business and Law
- Occupation: law enforcement

Military service
- Allegiance: Soviet Union; Russian Federation
- Branch/service: Ministry of Internal Affairs (Russia); Federal Tax Police Service; Ministry of Internal Affairs (Soviet Union)
- Years of service: 1983-2006
- Rank: Major General

Nikolai Gavrilovich Brykin (Russian: Николай Гаврилович Брыкин) is a Russian politician and public figure, deputy of the State Duma of the Russian Federation (since 2016). Member of the "United Russia" party. Chairman of the board of the regional public fund "Defense of the Fatherland", providing assistance to the veterans of special forces and security agencies combating terrorism. Lieutenant-General.

== Biography ==
Nikolai Gavrilovich Brykin was born on 25 November 1959 in Soldatskoye, Ostrogozhsky District, Voronezh Oblast. After graduating from school, Nikolay Brykin entered the Ostrogozhsky Agricultural College, after which he was conscripted for military service. His military service took place on the border with China, in the Eastern Military District, the Kurchum detachment, 10th border checkpoint Matveevka.

After returning from the army he spent some time working at SU-909 "Tyumendorstroy". At the same time, he entered the Road Construction Faculty of the Tyumen Engineering and Construction Institute.

Then he was sent as a reinforcement to the Ministry of Internal Affairs. During the 11 years of work in the Department of Internal Affairs of Nizhnevartovsk, Tyumen region, Nikolai Brykin has risen to the post of the head of the Economic Crimes Department (serving also as the deputy head of the criminal police). While working in the law enforcement system, he studied at the Higher School of Militia in Tyumen.

In 1994, Brykin was appointed the head of the Federal Tax Police Service of Russia (FSNP) in Nizhnevartovsk. In 1999, Brykin was transferred from the post of first deputy head of the Federal Tax Service (FSNP) for the Khanty-Mansiysk Autonomous District, to Moscow. He held the office of the first deputy head FSNP in Moscow up until the abolition of the Federal Tax Police Service.

In 2004 Brykin was appointed the head of the Economic Tax Crime Bureau of the Far Eastern Federal District and moved to the Far East.

In 2006, he was removed from his post by the Presidential Decree and retired with the rank of Major General.

After 2006, he held various top management positions in large corporations like Mechel, Rostopprom, and Rosneft. He also acted as co-founder of two commercial organizations.

In 2014, Brykin received an offer from the leadership of the Regional Public Fund of Assistance to Veterans of the Special Forces and the Security Agencies Combating Terrorism "Defense of the Fatherland". He became the permanent member and the first deputy chairman of the board of the fund.

In May 2016, Brykin participated in the United Russia primaries. He successfully passed the election and became the candidate for the deputy of the State Duma from the United Russia. According to the results of voting during the State Duma elections, he was elected the deputy via the United Russia federal lists. By the decision of the State Duma, he was appointed an authorized representative of the State Duma in the Supreme Court of the Russian Federation.

=== Sanctions ===
He was sanctioned by Canada under the Special Economic Measures Act (S.C. 1992, c. 17) in relation to the Russian invasion of Ukraine for Grave Breach of International Peace and Security. and by the UK government in 2022 in relation to the Russo-Ukrainian War.

== Family ==
Married, has a son and daughter, grandchildren

== Business career ==
Soon after his retirement from the law enforcement, Nikolai Brykin became the founder of the "Southern Breeze" LLC (TIN 2302055962), registered on October 12, 2007, in Krasnodar Krai. According to the official list of activities, the company works in the real estate, construction, and other related business fields, including railway communication. As of 2013, this company owned 98 lots of land near Novorossiysk, Krasnodar Krai. It is known that the said land property was the subject of legal disputes between the Southern Breeze LLC and the local authorities.

In October 2015, Brykin acted as the co-founder of the newly-established Bahus LLC (INN 2315985475), also registered in the Krasnodar Krai. The registration documents of the company specify 81 various activities, including grape farming, construction, woodworking, retail and wholesale trade of the various goods, etc.

In May 2016, Brykin sold his business assets to his daughter. Later he announced his decision to participate in the primaries of United Russia in the Tyumen region, and the elections into the State Duma.

== Criticism ==
The most controversial incident was reflected by the numerous publications both in mainstream media and in blogs. According to the information available in the media, Nikolai Brykin, with the help of his son-in-law Sergei Kiryanov, tried to capture a share in a company owned by the businessman and the opposition member Konstantin Dyulgerov. Dyulgerov claims that he was forced to pay Brykin and his accomplices for "protection" for quite a long time. As soon as he decided to refuse the "protection", they initiated the criminal proceedings against him, with investigation lasting several years.

From 2004 to 2006, Brykin was the head of the Economic Tax Crime Bureau of the Far Eastern Federal District. In 2006, the Presidential Decree removed him from his post. He retired with the rank of Major General. According to one of the theories available in the media, the true reason for Brykin's dismissal was his personal interest in one of the high-profile cases of large-scale fraud. Brykin's subordinates carried out the investigation negligently and contributed to its collapse.

Brykin, being the general director of Russian Fuel Company (OJSC Rostopprom), by virtue of the position held, directly participated in its bankruptcy. His actions as the general director of OJSC Rostopprom, as well as the surety documents signed by him, ultimately led to the bankruptcy of a previously successful state-owned company. Several powerful clans showed interest in seizing control over Rostoprom at that time.

In 2016, during the pre-election period, Brykin, according to available information, used various methods to negotiate a deal with major media companies in the region. He wanted to remove any negative information regarding his life and activities, as well as to provide exclusively positive news about him, even concerning minor events. Some media outlets received "warnings" when they refused to cooperate. As a result of this, the regional information field was partially "cleaned up". However, some of the publications on the Internet remained.

In September 2017, passed the year since Nikolay Brykin became the member of the State Duma. The output of his legislative activities was analyzed, based on official sources. According to the information of the State Duma, Nikolai Brykin participated in the development of 29 draft laws, however, he joined the development only after the draft laws have been already submitted for the discussion. Brykin acted as one of the primary initiators only once, as one of 11 co-authors of the amendment to one of the paragraphs of the federal law. In addition, according to the transcript of the State Duma, Brykin gave only 33 speeches per year. And most of them were remarks from a place, which lasted for 10–20 seconds, and mostly expressed the opinion of the committee in which he participates ("the committee recommends acceptance", or "the committee recommends rejecting the bill”). Deputy Brykin also did not participate in the voting on more than a thousand issues. And when he participated, he only voted "for" the proposals. These factors determined the low evaluation of Brykin's work as a deputy, given by the media.

Since August 2017, Nikolay Brykin used his deputy powers to protect the interests of Bank Yugra, which had its licence suspended and later withdrawn by the Central Bank of Russia. Brykin's lobbyism included sending the deputy requests to various instances, including the General Prosecutor's Office of the Russian Federation and frequent public statements. Some media viewed this as an attempt to exert pressure on the court and the Central Bank . In December 2017, the Moscow Arbitration Court adopted a decision on the complaint of Bank Yugra in which the decision of the supervisory authority to revoke the license was disputed. In accordance with the court decision, the stance of the Central Bank was recognized as lawful and justified, and the claims of Yugra were not a subject to satisfaction.

== Awards ==
- Awarded the Order of Merit for the Fatherland of the 4th degree, by the Decree of the President of the Russian Federation.
- Awarded the Medal of the Order of Merit for the Fatherland of the II degree, by the Decree of the President of the Russian Federation.
- Awarded the Medal "For Impeccable Service” three times.
