= Tyumen constituency =

Russian legislative constituency

Tyumen single-member constituency
- Constituency of the Russian State Duma

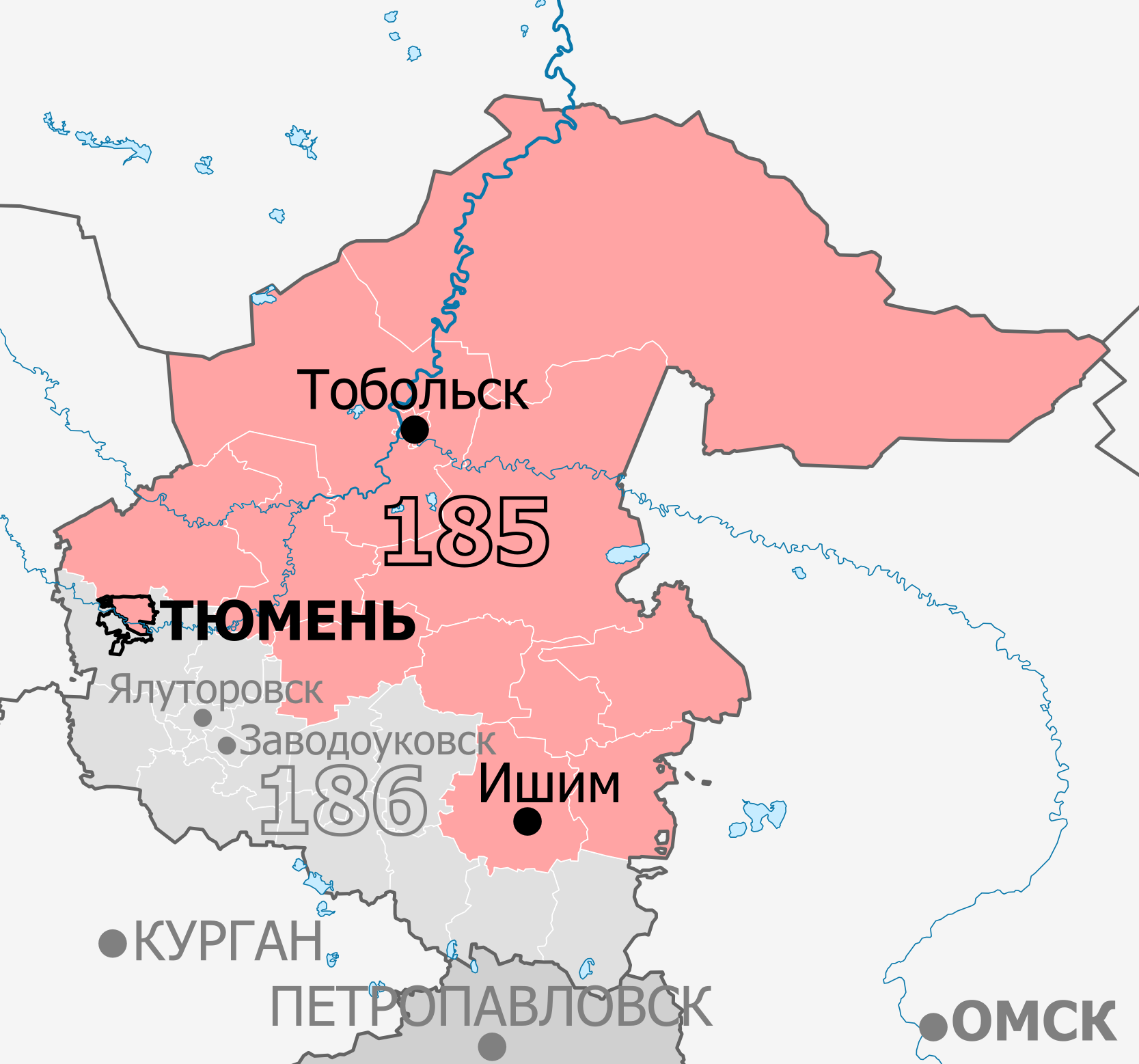
- Constituency boundaries since 2016
- Deputy: Nikolay Brykin; United Russia
- Federal subject: Tyumen Oblast
- Districts: Abatsky, Aromashevsky, Ishim, Ishimsky, Nizhnetavdinsky, Sorokinsky, Tobolsk, Tobolsky, Tyumen (Leninsky, Tsentralny), Uvatsky, Vagaysky, Vikulovsky, Yarkovsky, Yurginsky
- Voters: 549,975 (2026)

The Tyumen constituency (No.183 (Note: No.179 in 1993-2007, No.185 in 2016–2026)) is a Russian legislative constituency in Tyumen Oblast. The constituency covers northern half of Tyumen as well as northern Tyumen Oblast, including the towns Tobolsk and Ishim.

The constituency has been represented since 2021 by United Russia deputy Nikolay Brykin, three-term State Duma member, non-profit chairman and businessman, who won the open seat, succeeding three-term United Russia incumbent Ernest Valeev after the latter successfully sought re-election only through party-list representation.

== Boundaries ==
1993–2007: Isetsky District, Nizhnetavdinsky District, Tyumen, Tyumensky District
The constituency covered all of the oblast capital Tyumen as well as western Tyumen Oblast.

2016–present: Abatsky District, Aromashevsky District, Ishim, Ishimsky District, Nizhnetavdinsky District, Sorokinsky District, Tobolsk, Tobolsky District, Tyumen (Leninsky, Tsentralny), Uvatsky District, Vagaysky District, Vikulovsky District, Yarkovsky District, Yurginsky District
The constituency was re-created for the 2016 election and retained northern half of Tyumen as well as Nizhnetavdinsky District, losing the rest to new Zavodoukovsk constituency. This seat gained all of sparsely populated northern Tyumen Oblast from the dissolved Ishim constituency.

== Members elected ==
Election	Member	Party
1993	Aleksandr Trushnikov	Independent
1995	Gennady Raikov (Note: appointed Member of the Central Electoral Commission in March 2007)	Independent
1999	Gennady Raikov	Independent
2003	Gennady Raikov	People's Party
2007	Proportional representation - no election by constituency	
2011	Proportional representation - no election by constituency	
2016	Ernest Valeev	United Russia
2021	Nikolay Brykin	United Russia
2026	Nikolay Brykin	United Russia

== Election results ==
=== 1993 ===
Summary of the 12 December 1993 Russian legislative election in the Tyumen constituency
Candidate	Party	Votes	%
Aleksandr Trushnikov	Independent	47,105	25.54%
Nikolay Pavlov	Independent	37,479	20.32%
Valery Neverov	Independent	23,550	12.77%
Dmitry Vokin	Independent	11,047	5.99%
Viktor Samoylik	Yavlinsky–Boldyrev–Lukin	10,414	5.65%
Sergey Ivanov	Independent	5,855	3.17%
Aleksandr Makarov	Independent	5,063	2.75%
Vladimir Kirillov	Independent	2,721	1.48%
Anatoly Malykhin	Party of Russian Unity and Accord	2,040	1.11%
Anatoly Katerushin	Civic Union	2,016	1.09%
against all		20,255	10.98%
Total		184,424	100%

=== 1995 ===
Summary of the 17 December 1995 Russian legislative election in the Tyumen constituency
Candidate	Party	Votes	%
Gennady Raikov	Independent	53,246	20.56%
Aleksandr Trushnikov (incumbent)	Independent	31,272	12.07%
Boris Grigoryev	Independent	26,780	10.34%
Vladimir Chertishchev	Communist Party	25,816	9.97%
Gennady Chebotaryov	Our Home – Russia	24,377	9.41%
Aleksandr Repetov	Congress of Russian Communities	18,324	7.07%
Vladimir Matayev	Communists and Working Russia - for the Soviet Union	14,673	5.67%
Rimma Shilkova	Independent	12,156	4.69%
Valentin Timofeyev	Liberal Democratic Party	9,861	3.81%
Pavel Plavnik	Independent	5,994	2.31%
Oleg Andreyev	Independent	4,919	1.90%
Leonid Ksendzov	Independent	2,820	1.09%
against all		22,334	8.62%
Total		259,007	100%

=== 1999 ===
Summary of the 19 December 1999 Russian legislative election in the Tyumen constituency
Candidate	Party	Votes	%
Gennady Raikov (incumbent)	Independent	116,975	44.80%
Vadim Bondar	Union of Right Forces	31,387	12.02%
Svetlana Yaroslavova	Independent	25,218	9.66%
Yerzhan Makash	Independent	22,160	8.49%
Viktor Filatov	Yabloko	20,628	7.90%
against all		34,976	13.40%
Total		261,100	100%

=== 2003 ===
Summary of the 7 December 2003 Russian legislative election in the Tyumen constituency
Candidate	Party	Votes	%
Gennady Raikov (incumbent)	People's Party	120,563	47.64%
Valery Bagin	Party of Russia's Rebirth-Russian Party of Life	24,669	9.75%
Lyudmila Shuyupova	Independent	22,453	8.87%
Yakov Kosenkov	Agrarian Party	10,695	4.23%
Aleksandr Trushnikov	United Russian Party Rus'	7,550	2.98%
Vladimir Tretyakov	Independent	3,740	1.48%
Vyacheslav Lukichev	Great Russia – Eurasian Union	2,855	1.13%
Pavel Korostil	Independent	2,111	0.83%
against all		52,874	20.89%
Total		253,361	100%

=== 2016 ===
Summary of the 18 September 2016 Russian legislative election in the Tyumen constituency
Candidate	Party	Votes	%
Ernest Valeev	United Russia	244,634	56.80%
Sergey Morev	A Just Russia	38,997	9.05%
Gleb Trubin	Liberal Democratic Party	37,603	8.73%
Pavel Dorokhin	Communist Party	36,182	8.40%
Yevgenia Safiyeva	Communists of Russia	12,624	2.93%
Marat Bikmulin	Party of Growth	9,445	2.19%
Aleksandr Novoselov	Rodina	9,410	2.18%
Anzhela Semyonova	Yabloko	8,140	1.89%
Valery Shchukin	The Greens	7,553	1.75%
Aleksandr Nevzorov	Patriots of Russia	7,195	1.67%
Nikolay Komoltsev	Civilian Power	6,891	1.60%
Aleksandr Chekmaryov	People's Freedom Party	5,687	1.32%
Total		430,698	100%

=== 2021 ===
Summary of the 17-19 September 2021 Russian legislative election in the Tyumen constituency
Candidate	Party	Votes	%
Nikolay Brykin	United Russia	169,779	50.89%
Gleb Trubin	Liberal Democratic Party	38,377	11.50%
Zhalauddin Abdurazakov	Communist Party	34,334	10.29%
Sergey Solovyev	Party of Pensioners	28,472	8.53%
Dinar Abukin	Communists of Russia	25,460	7.63%
Svetlana Chuykova	Party of Growth	24,063	7.21%
Total		333,649	100%

=== 2026 ===
Summary of the 18-20 September 2026 Russian legislative election in the Tyumen constituency
Candidate	Party	Votes	%
Nikolay Brykin (incumbent)	United Russia	208,866	55.39%
Tamara Kazantseva	Communist Party	53,854	14.28%
Ivan Vershinin	Liberal Democratic Party	37,709	10.00%
Maksim Novikov	New People	24,765	6.57%
Sergey Morev	A Just Russia	20,599	5.46%
Dinar Abukin	Communists of Russia	15,257	4.05%
Sergey Matayev	Party of Pensioners	10,129	2.69%
Total		377,052	100%
