= Korobov =

Korobov (Russian: Коробов, from короб meaning box) is a Russian masculine surname, its feminine counterpart is Korobova. It may refer to:

- Anton Korobov (born 1985), Ukrainian chess player
- Daria Korobova (born 1989), Russian synchronized swimmer
- Dmitry Korobov (born 1989), Belarusian ice hockey player
- Dmitri Korobov (footballer) (born 1994), Russian football player
- Felix Korobov (born c.1975), Russian conductor
- Igor Korobov (1956–2018), Russian intelligence official
- Maxim Korobov (born 1957), Russian businessman
- Matvey Korobov (born 1983), Russian boxer
