= Solomatin =

Solomatin (masculine, Russian: Соломатин) or Solomatina (feminine, Russian: Соломатина) is a Russian surname. Notable people with the surname include:

- Aleksey Solomatin (1921–1943), Soviet air force captain
- Andrei Solomatin (born 1975), Russian soccer manager and former player
- Tatyana Solomatina (born 1956), Russian doctor and politician
- Yegor Solomatin (born 1964), Russian politician
