= Yuri Mamonov =

Russian politician (1958–2022)

- Юрий Васильевич Мамонов
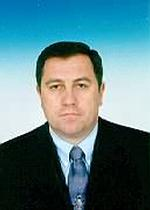

Deputy of the State Duma
- In office 18 January 2000 – 7 December 2003

Personal details
- Born: 18 February 1958 Moscow Oblast, Russian SFSR, Soviet Union
- Died: 11 June 2022 (aged 64) Moscow, Russia
- Party: Liberal Democratic Party of Russia
- Education: Moscow State University of Agroengineering

Yuri Vasilyevich Mamonov (Russian: Юрий Васильевич Мамонов; 18 February 1958 – 11 June 2022) was a Russian politician. He served as a Deputy of the State Duma for its 3rd convocation, between 2000 and 2003.

== Career ==
Mamonov was born in Moscow Oblast in the Soviet Union on 18 February 1958. He graduated from the Moscow State University of Agroengineering in 1980. He worked as a teacher between 1980 and 1982, and was a member of the Communist Party of the Soviet Union. From 1982 to 1988 he carried out party and Komsomol work, and then from 1988 to 1994 he was chief mechanic, and then chief engineer, of the Ilyinskoye experimental farm. In 1994 he became General Director and Chairman of the board of directors of CJSC All Stars, an international freight transportation company based in Moscow Oblast.

Prior to his entry into politics, Mamonov was working as an adviser to CJSC All Stars. He was returned in the 1999 legislative election as a member of the State Duma's 3rd convocation as a member of the Liberal Democratic Party of Russia. During his time as a Duma member he served on the Committee on Energy, Transport and Communications. After his time in the Duma, Mamonov became a business entrepreneur.

Mamonov was found dead on 11 June in an apartment building on Sadovaya-Kudrinskaya Street in Moscow. He was 64 years old.
