= Vladimir Entov =

Soviet-American applied mathematician and physicist

- Born: Vladimir Markovich Entov; January 8, 1937; Moscow, USSR
- Died: April 10, 2008 (aged 71); Rockville, Maryland, United States
- Education: Gubkin Russian State University of Oil and Gas
- Scientific career
- Fields: Applied Mathematics, Physics
- Workplaces: Institute for Problems in Mechanics of the Russian Academy of Sciences, Gubkin Russian State University of Oil and Gas

Notes
- List of publications

Vladimir Markovich Entov (January 8, 1937 – April 10, 2008) was an applied mathematician and physicist.

== Biography ==
During his high school years, Entov won multiple awards at the all-Union Physics Olympiads. In 1954 he graduated from a high school with a Gold Medal (valedictorian). He applied to the Physics Department of the Moscow State University, but was rejected on ideological grounds. The same year he began his study at the Mechanical Department of the Moscow Institute for Oil and Gas.

In his second year, he approached Professor I.A. Charny and asked him for a research assignment. This was a beginning of their close personal and scientific friendship, which lasted until the death of Professor Charny.

Upon his graduation from the Moscow Institute for Oil and Gas in 1959, Entov began a long-distance course of study at the mathematical department of the Moscow State University, while working in the Institute For Drilling Technology.

In 1961 he began his graduate study with Professor I.A.Charny, and in 1965 he successfully defended his dissertation thesis “Non- stationary problems of the non-linear filtration”, earning the title of “Candidate of Science" (roughly equivalent to PhD).

Beginning in 1971 and until his death, Entov worked at the Institute for Problems in Mechanics of the Soviet Academy of Science. In 1972 he was awarded the title of Doctor of Sciences for his dissertation thesis "Hydrodynamic theory of filtration of anomalous fluids", completed at the Institute for Problems in Mechanics. In his years at the Institute, Vladimir supervised the theses of 24 Candidates of Science and six Doctors of Science. He worked as a scientific supervisor at the Laboratory of Applied Continuum Mechanics until the last years of his life.

In addition, since 1983 he served as a Professor of Applied Mathematics and Computer Modeling of the Moscow Institute of Oil and Gas (now known as the Gubkin Russian State University of Oil and Gas).

Since 1993, Vladimir was actively involved in research and teaching activity in France (Institut de Physique du Globe de Paris), the UK (University of Cambridge and University of Oxford), and the USA (WPI, University of Stanford, MIT, UMN).

Professor Entov was a Corresponding Member of The Russian Academy of the Natural Sciences, a member of the Russian National Committee for the Theoretical and Applied Mechanics, a member of the International Society for the Interaction of Mechanics and Mathematics, and a member of the editorial board of the European Journal of Applied Mathematics (Cambridge University Press).

== Works published (partial list) ==
Works include:

1. Теория нестационарной фильтрации жидкости и газа // М., "Недра", 1972 (совместно с Г.И.Баренблаттом, В.М.Рыжиком)
2. Гидродинамическая теория фильтрации аномальных жидкостей // М., "Наука", 1975 (совместно с М.Г.Бернадинером)
3. Движение жидкостей и газов в природных пластах // М., "Недра", 1984 (совместно с Г.И.Баренблаттом, В.М.Рыжиком)
4. Гидродинамика в бурении // М., "Недра", 1985 (совместно с А.Х. Мирзаджанзаде)
5. Качественные методы в механике сплошных сред // М., "Наука", 1989 (совместно с Р.В.Гольдштейном)
6. Гидродинамика процессов повышения нефтеотдачи // М., "Недра", 1989 (совместно с А.Ф.Зазовским)
7. Математическая теория целиков остаточной вязкопластичной нефти // Томск, Издательство Томского Университета, 1989 (совместно с В.Н.Панковым и С.В.Панько)
8. Fluids Flow through Natural Rocks // Dordrecht, "Kluwer Academic Publishers", 1990 (with G.I. Barenblatt, V.M.Ryzhik)
9. Qualitative Methods in Continuum Mechanics // New York, "Longman Scientific & Technical", 1994 (with R.V. Goldstein)
10. Mechanics of Continua and Its Application to Gas and Oil Productions // Moscow, "Moscow Nedra", 2008 (with E.V. Glivenko)
