= Abdul-Vahed Niyazov =

Russian businessman (born 1969)

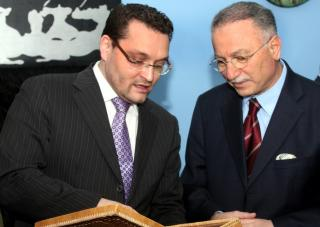
- Abdul-Vakhed Niyazov (left) and Ekmeleddin İhsanoğlu
- Born: 23 April 1969 (age 55); Omsk, Russian SFSR, Soviet Union
- Occupation: Businessman

Abdul-Vahed Validovich Niyazov (Russian: Абдул-Вахед Валидович Ниязов), born Vadim Valerianovich Medvedev (Russian: Вадим Валерианович Медведев; 23 April 1969) is a Russian businessman and Islamic social and political activist. He was president of the Islamic Cultural Center of Russia, and the public division of Russian Council of Muftis.

== Life and career ==
Niyazov was born on 23 April 1969 in Omsk as Vadim Valerianovich Medvedev. After graduating from high school, he served in the engineering and construction troops of the Baikal-Amur Mainline. In 1990 he began studying at the Moscow Historical and Archival Institute, but failed to graduate.

In April 1991 Niyazov became president of the Islamic Cultural Centre of Moscow, which in 1993 became the Islamic Cultural Centre of Russia, established with the financial support of the Embassy of Saudi Arabia, Moscow. In February 1994 he became deputy chairman of the executive committee of the Supreme Coordination Centre of the Spiritual Directorates of Muslims of Russia (VKTs DUMR, Russian: ВКЦ ДУМР). In May 1995 Niyazov became co-chairman of the Union of Muslims of Russia. In autumn 1998, he was elected chairman of the Council of the All-Russian political social movement "Refakh" (Prosperity). On 19 December 1999 Niyazov was elected a deputy of the State Duma's third convocation as part of the "Interregional movement Unity ("Bear")" electoral bloc, on the federal list of the Union of Muslims of Russia. He worked as deputy chairman of the State Duma Committee on the regulations and organization of the work of the State Duma. He was expelled from the faction for "provocative" statements in support of "world Islamic extremism and terrorism", on the subject of the Palestinian-Israeli conflict during the Second Intifada.

In May 2001 Niyazov became chairman of the political council of the "Eurasian Party — Union of Patriots of Russia". By late 2007 Niyazov was head of the movement "Muslims in support of President Putin". In 2011 he was elected Honorary President of the international initiative "SalamWorld", which aimed to create a social network for Muslims along Sharia norms. The site had closed by 2015 after spending three years in development and tens of million of dollars in marketing, having had backup and funding issues. Since 2018, Niyazov has been president of the European Muslim Forum.
