= Teki Biçoku =

Albanian geologist (1926–2009)

- Born: Teki Isak Biçoku; 6 June 1926; Elbasan, Albania
- Died: 21 November 2009 (aged 83); Tirana, Albania
- Education: Petroleum Institute “Gubkin”
- Parent: Isak Biçoku (father)
- Family: Biçoku

Teki Isak Biçoku (6 June 1926 – 21 November 2009) was an Albanian geologist and former member and president of the Academy of Sciences of Albania.

== Biography ==
Tell Biçoku was born in Elbasan on the 6th of June 1926 to an Albanian family, his father was Isak Biçoku as we can see from his middle name. He completed his elementary education in Elbasan(1932–1937), after which he pursued his studies in the Shkolla Normale e Elbasanit. In addition, he studied in the Technique Schools of Korça (1942–43), and Tirana (1946–47). In 1943-44 he was involved in the Antifascist War and in 1944-46 he served in the military as a courier.

He pursued university studies at The Petroleum Institute “Gubkin” of Moscow, (1948–1953). On March 20, 1953 he graduated and earned the title "Geophysical Engineer".

On April 5, 1965 Biçoku received a Doctorate in Science and on April 27, 1970 earned the title of Professor. On January 22, 1973 Biçoku became a member of the Albanian Academy of Sciences and on September 3, 2008 became an active member of the European Academy of Sciences and Arts; Class IV-Sciences of Nature. On December 4, 2008 Biçoku became a Permanent Member of Albanian Academy of Sciences until his death.

== Professional career ==
His first job was as a geophysical engineer in the seismic expedition of Fier, (April 6, 1953 - December 31, 1954). On January 1, 1955 he was nominated Chief of Geological branch in the General Directory of Geology in Tirana. On June 1, 1957 Biçoku was nominated Vice President and Chief Geologist of the State Commission of Geology and subsequently Geologist in chief of the General Directorate of Geology in the Ministry of Mines and Geology. On April 1, 1966 he is re-nominated General Director of Geology in the Ministry of Industry and Mines.

== Imprisonment and Innocence ==
From August 1, 1975 till May 14, 1977 was transferred as geophysical engineer near the seismic expedition of Seism-Gravimetric Enterprise of Fier, where he was arrested. He was sentenced for 20 years in prison under the accusation “Sabotage, agitation and propaganda”. He stayed for 11 years and 6 months in jail, and left the prison on December 16, 1988.

On September 25, 1991 the Plenum and the Penal College of High Court of Albania, declared Acad. Prof. Dr. Teki Biçoku not guilty for the above-mentioned accuses and acquitted him of all the charges.

== President of the Albanian Academy of Sciences ==
During the period February 22, 2008 - February 23, 2009 he was President of the Albanian Academy of Sciences.

== Participation in Geological Forums ==
- Head of the technical-scientific ministerial council of geology (1955–75)
- Head of the Ministerial Council State Commission of Minerals (1957–75)
- Head of the Geology and Geophysical Qualifying Commission of the Geology and Mine Faculty, University of Tirana (1958–75).
- Member of the Economic State Commission, and permanent deputy of Albania in the Committee of Reciprocal Economic Aid (KNER) (1955–61)
- Member of Scientific Council of Geology and Mine faculty, University of Tirana (1962–1975)
- Chief-redactor of periodic (now Buletini i Shkencave Gjeologjike) (1965–75)
- Member of Headship of the Albanian Geosciences Union (from year 2000)
- Chief-redactor of periodic Buletini i Shkencave Gjeologjike (1997–2006)
- Member of Editorial Staff of Buletini i Shkencave Gjeologjike (2006–2009)
- Organizer of 5 National Conferences of Geology during 1956-68.

== Rewards ==
- 1946 "Medalja e Kujtimit"
- 1946 "Medalja e Çlirimit"
- 1953 "Medalja e Trimërisë"
- 1957 "Urdhëri i Punës" Klasi II
- 1962 "Urdhëri i Punës" Klasi I
- 1970 "Cmimi i Republikës" Shkalla I
- 2001 "Urdhëri Mjeshtër i Madh"
- 2004 "Medalja 60 Vjetori i Çlirimit të Atdheut"
