= Gennady Raikov =

Russian politician (1939–2023)

- Геннадий Райков
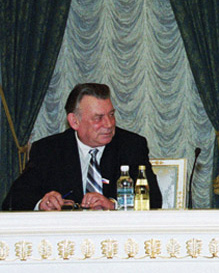
- Raikov in 2010

Member of the State Duma for Tyumen
- In office 17 December 1995 – 24 December 2007
- Preceded by: Aleksandr Trushnikov
- Succeeded by: proportional representation Ernest Valeev (2016)

Personal details
- Born: Gennady Ivanovich Raikov; 8 August 1939 Khabarovsk, Russian SFSR, USSR
- Died: 28 September 2023 (aged 84) Moscow, Russia
- Party: CPSU; NPRF
- Education: Omsk State Technical University
- Occupation: Engineer, politician
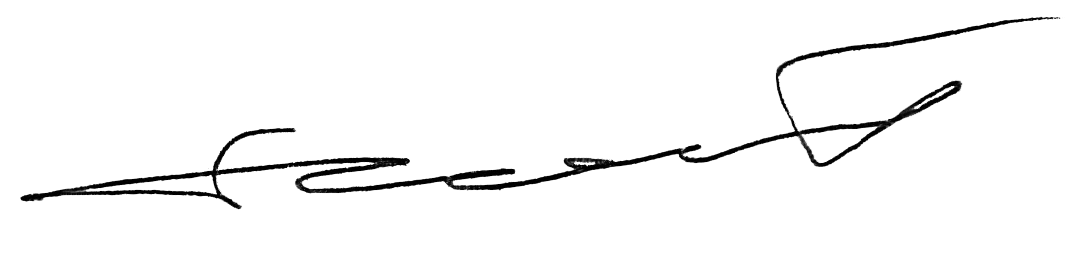
- Signature

Gennady Ivanovich Raikov (Russian: Генна́дий Ива́нович Райко́в; 8 August 1939 – 28 September 2023) was a Russian engineer and politician. A member of the People's Party, he served in the State Duma from 1995 to 2007.

Raikov died in Moscow on 28 September 2023, at the age of 84.

== Awards ==
- March 16, 2000 – Order "For Merit to the Fatherland"
- January 20, 2015 – Order of Alexander Nevsky
- December 27, 2007 – Order of Friendship
- August 6, 2009 – Russian Federation Presidential Certificate of Honour
