= Vladimir Grachev =

Russian scientist and politician (1942–2026)

- Владимир Грачёв
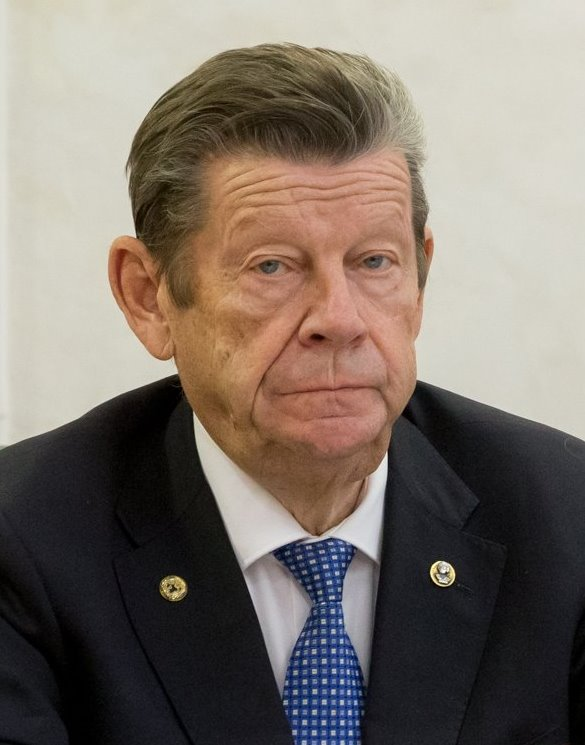
- Grachev in 2017

Member of the State Duma

Personal details
- Born: 2 March 1942 Taymaniha, Ivanovo Oblast, Russian RSFSR, Soviet Union
- Died: 26 April 2026 (aged 84)
- Party: Unity
- Education: Penza Polytechnic Institute; Moscow Institute of Electronic Machine Building
- Awards: Order For Merit to the Fatherland, Order of Honour (Russian Federation)

Vladimir Aleksandrovich Grachev (Russian: Владимир Александрович Грачёв; 3 March 1942 – 26 April 2026) was a Russian scientist, politician and ecologist. He had a doctorate in engineering, and was a professor and corresponding member of the Russian Academy of Sciences. Grachev served as a member of the Supreme Soviet of the Russian SFSR, the 3rd State Duma, and the 4th State Duma. From 2008, he served as the advisor to the CEO of the State Atomic Energy Corporation Rosatom, chairman of the Public Council under the Rostekhnadzor, chairman of the Central Council of the All-Russian Society for Nature Conservation (2002–2010, 2017–2021), and president of the Vladimir Vernadsky Non-Governmental Environmental Fund.

Grachev was also a member of the Advisory Council under the Chairman of the Accounts Chamber of the Russian Federation, as well as a Member of the Parliamentary Assembly of the Council of Europe, the Russian Federation Commission for UNESCO, and the Supreme Environmental Council of the State Duma Committee on natural resources, the environment, and ecology.

== Formation and academic degrees ==
In 1960, Grachev graduated with honors from Ivanovo Industrial College. In 1961, enrolled in the Penza Polytechnic Institute, specializing in foundry, from which he graduated with honors in 1966. In 1967, he enrolled in the graduate school of the Moscow Institute of Electronic Machine Building (MIEM). In 1969, he defended his master's thesis, and, in 1987, his doctoral dissertation. From 1991, he was a corresponding member of the Russian Academy of Sciences, in the department of physical chemistry and technology of inorganic materials. In 1996, he received a second degree in law at the Penza State University.

== Beginning of professional activity ==
After graduating from Ivanovo Industrial College in 1960, Grachev worked until 1974 at the Penza compressor plant where he moved from shop foreman to chief metallurgist of the head laboratory. From 1974 onward, Grachev was a senior lecturer, associate professor, and, from 1980, head of the "Machinery and Technology Foundry Department" of the Penza Polytechnic Institute. He was also the head of the department at the Bauman Moscow State Technical University and the Academy of Labour and Social Relations.

== Career timeline ==
1960–1974	technician, foreman, engineer, head of bureau, chief metallurgist of the head lab (Compressor Plant, Penza);
1974–1993	Senior lecturer, associate professor, head of the department of the Penza Polytechnic Institute;
1993–1999	Head of the staff of the Federation Council Committee on Science, Culture, Education, Health and Environment;
1995–2009	Head of the Department of Regional Economy and Innovation of the Academy of Tourism and Social Relations (part-time);
1999–2007	State Duma Deputy, chairman of the Committee on Ecology;
2000–2007	Member of the Parliamentary Assembly of the Council of Europe;
2008–2026	Advisor to the Director General of the State Corporation "Rosatom", chairman of the board of the International Environmental NGO «GREENLIGHT».

== Contributions to metallurgy ==
Grachev's main areas of research were: thermodynamics, kinetics, and mechanism of interaction between the phases of metals and alloys, research works in thermodynamics and kinetics of melting of cast alloys, and environment and resource-saving in these processes.

In 1960–1974, at the Penza compressor plant, Grachev, beside his main work, carried out research on the rational use of natural gas fuel in industry. As a result of his innovations and inventions, all heating and drying ovens powered with liquid and solid fuels were converted to natural gas, bringing the plant considerable economic benefits and significantly reducing the adverse impact of the foundry on the environment. Grachev continued his research work, initiated at the plant, at the Penza Polytechnic Institute. This resulted in the theoretical justification of the implementation of the cupola process with natural gas instead of coke. The economic and environmental benefits of widespread use of the developed method were proven.

Grachev contributed to the theory of melting processes of casting alloys: he carried out a systematic analysis of these processes and developed a theory of interaction between the phases, taking into account the effect of temperature fluctuations, which greatly enriched the theoretical basis of melting thermodynamics, mechanics and kinetics of melting. His work was recognized abroad. In recent years, under the leadership of Grachev, a fundamentally new design of furnaces for melting aluminum alloys has been established, as well as a number of problems in the field of environmental engineering practice having been solved.

== Federal Assembly of Russia ==
In 1990, Grachev was nominated as a candidate to be a member of the Congress of People's Deputies of Russia by the staff of the Penza Polytechnic Institute, and elected at Pervomaisky district No. 568 (Penza Oblast) to the Congress of the Supreme Council. From 1990 to 1993, he was the deputy chairman of the Supreme Council for science and public education. He was a member of the "Communists for Democracy" faction. In December 1992, Grachev made a speech on behalf of the "Free Russia" faction at the seventh session. In the speech, which took place under the Russian Federation, Grachev advocated for expense reduction in defense, space exploration, and the maintenance of bureaucracy. In addition, he suggested lowering external debt accumulated by Russia by expanding the production of consumer goods, which would supplant the economic loss of a decreased military production and spending. In addition, he advocated for reallocating capital investments, and diverting the funds to the agricultural sector.

In 1999, Grachev became chief of staff of the Russian Federation Council Committee on Science, Culture, Education, Health and Environment. On 19 December 1999, he was elected to the third State Duma from the Unity Party. In January 2000, he registered as a member of the parliamentary faction of the Unity Party in the State Duma; and, on 19 January 2000, he became head of the Committee on Environment. On 27 February 2000, at the founding congress of the all Russian political public movement "Unity", Grachev was elected member of the Political Council of "Unity". On 27 May 2000, at the founding congress of "Unity", he was elected member of the Presidium of the political council of the party.

On 7 December 2003, Grachev was elected to the fourth State Duma from the party "United Russia". He became a member of the faction "United Russia". He was then elected Chairman of the Committee on Ecology of the State Duma. As a member of the General Council of the Party, Grachev had a wide range of responsibilities in the assigned territories. In 2006, he was appointed coordinator of the Russian political party "United Russia" on environmental issues.

As Chairman of the State Duma Committee on Ecology, Grachev was personally involved in the development of more than 40 bills. He heads working groups for 18 of them, including the following:

- "On the board for the negative impact on the environment" (Federal Law of 10 January 2002 N 7-FZ "On Environmental Protection". Article 16. Fee for a negative impact on the environment)
- Federal Law of 26 June 2008 N 96-FZ – On Introducing Amendments to the Federal Law "On Ecological Expertise"
- "On the areas of ecological disaster" (Federal Law of 10 January 2002 N 7-FZ "On Environmental Protection". Chapter VIII, Environmental disaster areas, emergencies areas)
- "On soil protection" (Project of the Federal Law N 83224-3 «On soil protection" [introduced into the State Duma])
- "On ecological culture" (Draft Federal Law "On Environmental Culture» No. 90060840-3 (introduced 7/13/2000))
- "On Amending the Federal Law 'On Specially Protected Natural Territories'"
- "On Amending the Federal Law "On the Hydrometeorological Service""
- "On Amending the Federal Law "On Protection of Lake Baikal"

Under the leadership of Grachev, the Federal Law "On Environmental Protection" has been developed and adopted It is the country's "environmental constitution" that enables efficient combination of environmental protection, environmental management, and effective maintenance of all the sectors of economy.

On the initiative of the environmental community and the efforts of Grachev, on 23 July 2007, Vladimir Putin established by decree a professional holiday – Day of the Ecologist – observed on 5 June.

== Post Federal Assembly period ==
From the beginning of his career, Grachev was paying much attention to environmental problems of the nuclear industry. Working in the Federal Assembly, he resolved, at the legislative level, issues related to the development of nuclear energy and nuclear safety. Grachev was author and active promoter of the concept that the large-scale introduction of nuclear power would solve global environmental problems. Largely due to his convictions, he became an advisor to the Director General, SC "Rosatom" in 2008 after retiring from government.

== Environmental activity ==
In addition to his main profession, Grachev was chairman of the Public Council of Rostekhnadzor.

Grachev was a member of the Supreme Environmental Council of the State Duma Committee on Natural Resources, Environment and Ecology and a member of the advisory board under the Chairman of the Accounts Chamber of the Russian Federation.

Grachev interacted with international organizations, participating in international projects, symposia, conferences, forums – as an integral part of his activity. He was a member of the Parliamentary Assembly of the Council of Europe and the Russian Federation Commission for UNESCO.

In 2001, Grachev founded the Ecological Movement of Concrete Deeds. This is a social movement whose goal was protection of the environment, human health, environmental safety, and prevention of environmental and technological disasters through concrete actions. On this basis, in 2010 the international environmental non-governmental organization Greenlight was established. Grachev was chairman of its executive board.

Greenlight is an international public environmental organization created to promote the establishment and development of clean and safe forms of energy production, to actively promote, conserve and restore the natural environment, and be interested in continual improvements in the areas of environmental protection and health care. The organization focuses on a number of activities, among them: natural resources management; environmental monitoring, providing independent and transparent view of the environmental performance of a wide range of projects; public participation in environmental policy implementation; and creation of a favorable ecological environment and human habitat.

Greenlight's mission statement:

- promote the establishment and development of clean, environment friendly and safe forms of energy production;
- promote cooperation between environmental NGOs and government in environmental policy implementation in accordance with the Ecological Doctrine of Russia and the concept of sustainable development declared by the UN;
- independent environmental monitoring;
- create a database on the state of the environment in Russia and the latest scientific and technical achievements in the fields of environmental protection and management;
- development, adoption and implementation of "Greenlight's" own environmental programs;
- participate in solving climate change problems by promoting the development and implementation of green technologies and energy-saving high-tech solutions and intensifying efforts in discussions and negotiations held under the United Nations Framework Convention on Climate Change (UNFCCC) and Kyoto Protocol;
- promote an environmental investments system, providing financial and economic aspects of environmental and health protection systems, eliminate consequences of environmental and technological disasters;
- promote the development and implementation of the latest environment friendly technologies and equipment for different industries and agriculture;
- promote the development and improvement of hydrogen energy technologies;
- promote radiation safety;
- promote green processing, transportation and disposal of waste;
- promote the destruction of chemical weapons in an environmentally acceptable manner introducing safe technologies of its utilization;
- participate in groups for preparation of the legislative and other normative-legal acts and international treaties in the field of ecology;
- promote environmental culture, education and ecological thinking, involve volunteers into environmental management;
- promote basic and applied research; and
- environmental consulting and analytical reviews.

Arthur Chilingarov is Chairman of the Supreme Council of Greenlight. He is a distinguished Russian scientist and oceanographer, political leader, Hero of the Soviet Union and Hero of the Russian Federation, Doctor of Geography, and Corresponding Member of the Russian Academy of Sciences.

The Presidium of the Greenlight Supreme Council includes:

- Valery Chereshnev – Greenlight board member, chairman of the State Duma Committee on Science and High Technology, Doctor of Medicine, professor, academician of the Russian Academy of Medical Sciences and Academy of Sciences.
- Aleksander Ishkov – Doctor of Chemical Sciences, professor, author of 100 academic papers and 20 inventions. He participated in many international projects, headed numerous groups to develop draft laws, concepts and programs.
- Gennadiy Onishchenko – Chief State Sanitary Doctor of the Russian Federation, Doctor of Medicine, professor, academician of the Academy of Medical Sciences, Honoured Doctor of the Russian Federation.
- Mikhail Zalikhanov – Member of the State Duma Committee for Science and High Technology, Doctor of Geological Sciences, academician of the Russian Academy of Sciences, author of over 300 academic papers and 32 inventions.
- Boris Myasoedov – academician, Doctor of Chemical Sciences, professor, head of laboratory, author of over 450 academic papers, including three monographs and more than 25 patents.

Currently Greenlight operates in 6 other countries – Italy, France, the United States, the Czech Republic, Kazakhstan, and Ukraine. New offices are going to open in 11 more countries.

The international environmental organization Greenlight includes 32 program committees. They address the most pressing environmental issues of global significance. The following activities organized by Greenlight are of particular significance:

- National Conference on Environmental Education (25 October 2009);
- Conference "Development of Environmental Policy Framework of the Russian Federation until 2030" (21 October 2010);
- Conference "Development and implementation of a comprehensive plan of research of weather and climate" (27 August 2010);
- The Second National Conference on Environmental Education (25 November 2011).

== Parliamentary Assembly of the Council of Europe ==
Grachev was a member of the Parliamentary Assembly of the Council of Europe (PACE) since 2000. He defended the interests of the Russian Federation on issues of ecology, the environment, nuclear energy, science, education, agriculture, culture, etc. He repeatedly raised the question of adequate assessment of the global ecological role of Russia in the world in his discourses at the PACE:

With only 2% of GDP, Russia contributes no less than 10% of the worldwide ecological system: we have 13 million km^{2} of pristine ecosystems, more than 11 million km^{2} of forests, which make 25% of the world's forests. These are the "green lungs" of the planet. About a quarter of all the world's fresh water is in Russia. The global ecological role of Russia should be adequately assessed. Global warming, radioactive waste, nuclear power - these most important issues are directly related to our country.

Cooperating with PACE, Grachev had repeatedly drawn its attention to the following issues:

- potential threats to the ecosystem of the Baltic Sea in relation to the disposal of chemical weapons of the Second World War at the bottom;
- global climate change caused by carbon dioxide accumulation;
- radioactive waste and the environment;
- environment protection in the Arctic region.

In 2011, at the April session of the Parliamentary Assembly of the Council of Europe Grachev was officially awarded the diploma of honorary member of the PACE and the medal Pro Merito ("For Merit").

Presenting the award and a diploma, PACE President Mevlut Cavusoglu pointed out the importance of Grachev's work in the Parliamentary Assembly in 2000–2008:

It's an honour for the Committee on the Environment and its members to have had as a colleague a person who was chairman of the Committee on the Environment of the State Duma of the Russian Federation and a recognized expert in the field of energy and the Kyoto Protocol.

== Rosatom State Corporation ==
Grachev was an advisor to the head of the state-owned enterprise Rosatom, as well as a member of its public council. Grachev had repeatedly raised questions concerning the joint (international) development and use of nuclear binding energy in order to ensure global energy security.

The international community needs to effectively address three interrelated challenges – energy security, economic growth and environmental protection. Fair and competitive, market-based responses to global energy challenges will help to prevent possible destructive actions that threaten the production, supply and transit of energy and create a sound basis for dynamic and sustainable development of our civilization in the long term.

Grachev believed that in the next 30–50 years Nuclear binding energy should make a meaningful contribution to energy security as the basis for sustainable development. At a meeting of the PACE in 2010, he said:

Nuclear power is the most viable, technologically proven, environmentally friendly and competitive alternative to hydrocarbon energy. We believe that developing nuclear power, the world is moving in the right direction. The attractiveness of nuclear energy is determined by its competitive advantages such as the lowest compared to other energy sources dependence on fuel prices growth, small amount of energy transportation, deep study of the issues of nuclear and environmental safety, environmental protection, absence of greenhouse gas emissions and negative impact on the climate. <...> The strategic direction of nuclear power development is the further internationalization of the nuclear fuel cycle in order to ensure reliable access to the countries interested in its products and services, with absolute respect to the international non-proliferation regime. The tasks facing Russia and the world community, are global by nature. So stable, secure, safe nuclear power development is possible only by working together on multilateral and bilateral basis. Russia, as one of the world leading suppliers of uranium products and services is completely open and ready for such cooperation.

Despite the tragedy that occurred as a result of the accident at the Fukushima Nuclear Power Plant-I Grachev remained committed to his views on the future of the nuclear industry. On 14 April 2011, he gave an interview to the newspaper Moskovsky Komsomolets, as well as to the TV channel RBC. As an expert, he answered questions: what happened in the Japanese nuclear power plants; what are the consequences of radiation leakage in Russia and in the world; is there any danger for Russian regions; what impact will the accident at the "Fukushima-1" have on plans for nuclear power?

Grachev, while chairman of the Committee of Environment in the State Duma, paid great attention to issues relating to nuclear and radiation safety in Russia. Through effective collaboration with the state corporation Rosatom in 2006, it became possible to achieve concrete results in addressing the issue of the resettlement of the Muslyumovo settlement residents, as well as to solve problems of the radioactive contamination of the Techa River.

From 2008 and for several years, Grachev was closely involved in the development of environmental policy of Rosatom. In 2011, Grachev co-authored a book: The Environmental Policy of the State Corporation 'Rosatom'. The book presents the environmental policy of Rosatom in accordance with the goals and challenges facing the nuclear industry of Russia, and describes the technical, legal, and institutional framework of the implementation of environmental policy of Rosatom. The book is intended for employees of the nuclear industry, allied industries professionals, educators and students of higher and secondary educational institutions, and the general public interested in the problems of ecological safety and environmental protection.

In 2010, as the adviser to the director of Rosatom and as chairman of the board of Greenlight, Grachev was awarded a medal for outstanding achievements in the nuclear industry.

== Federal Service for Environmental, Technological, and Nuclear Supervision ==
From 2008, Grachev was the head of the Public Council under the Federal Service for Ecological, Technological and Nuclear Supervision (Rostekhnadzor). The Public Council of Rostechnadzor includes scientists, doctors, professors, and representatives of public organizations in all the fields of Rostekhnadzor's interest. At the first meeting of the Public Council on 14 January 2008 Grachev said:

The creation of the Public Council is an important event in terms of considering public opinion in the Federal Service for Ecological, Technological and Nuclear Supervision. To implement the 24 types of supervision, which the Service provides, it is important to keep in touch with the public. Control is a conflict between producers and controllers. From this perspective public opinion is very important. The combination of the views of citizens, community organizations and academia provides a one comprehensive view. Then it becomes a sophisticated and objective opinion. This will allow Rostechnadzor and the public to receive information not in a distorted form, which sometimes happens. It is very important to form an opinion not based on the statements of offended rule violators, but on the real state of affairs. The reflection of the objective image is perhaps the most important thing in the work of the Public Council."

In July 2011, the Coordinating Committee on public councils in the federal government prepared a summary rating of the effectiveness of public councils in the federal government for the 1st half of 2011. The Public Council of the Federal Service for Ecological, Technological and Nuclear Supervision took first place.

== Death ==
Grachev died on 26 April 2026, at the age of 84.

== Awards ==
- Order of Honour;
- Order For Merit to the Fatherland IV class;
- Medal of the Order "For Merit to the Fatherland" II class;
- Medal "For chemical disarmament";
- Medal "For the protection of the environment";
- Order of National Glory;
- Highest award of Kuzbass "Key of Friendship";
- Jubilee Awards of St. Petersburg and Yakutia;
- Governmental Prize of 2006 in the field of science and technology for developing and implementing a system of environmental monitoring as a component of strategic security;
- Double award of the title "Inventor of the USSR" and the honorary title of Rospatent for achievements in innovation.

== Works ==
The result of Grachev's academic research can be seen in more than 615 published works, 26 monographs, 7 textbooks for high schools, 15 manuals. He was the academic supervisor of more than 10 dissertations for candidate's and doctor's degree.

- Grachev was the author of 242 inventions protected by copyright certificates of the USSR, by patents of Russia and other countries:
  - V.Grachev., A.Cherni and others. "Gas cupola", А. С. No. 167613, 10.04.65, B No. 2, 1965;
  - V.Grachev., A.Cherni and others. "Method of smelting iron in a gas cupola", А. С. No. 257699, 6.07.66г., B No. 36, 1969. USA Patent No. 3558791, 7.05.71;
  - V.Grachev and others. "Electroslag furnace for casting iron", А. С. No. 521745, 30.11.75;
  - V.Grachev, V.Poruchikov, V.Miliaev and others. "Method of centrifugal casting ", А. С.USSR No. 776743;
  - V.Grachev, V.Morgunov and others. "Shaft furnace for melting aluminum alloys", А. С. USSR No. 972202, B.I. No. 41, 1982;
  - V.Grachev, E.Kirin, N.Gorelov. "Method of managing smelting iron in a gas cupola with refractory nozzle and air heaters", А. С. USSR No. 1067902;
  - A.Cherni, V.Grachev and others. "Gas multinozzle burner", А. С. No. 256930, 10.11.66, B No. 35, 1969;
  - A.Cherni, V.Grachev and others. "Method of melting metal in a gas cupola", А. С. No. 269947, 18.11.66, B No. 16, 1970. Patents: USA No. 3753688, 5.11.73, Belgium No. 702319, 15.05.68, Netherlands No. 150223, 16.05.77, Japan No. 844668, 18.07.72, GFR No. 1583279, 24.08.70, Sweden No. 339534, 24.04.72, France No. 1561093, 8.02.71, England No. 1206976, 1.03.71, Italy No. 863027, 5.10.70;
  - A.Cherni, V.Grachev and others. "Unit for the continuous production of steel", А. С. No. 251775, 22.05.67, B No. 28, 1969;
  - A.Cherni, V.Grachev and others. "Gas burner", А. С. No. 293488, 3.04.70. Patent: Japan No. 834475, 7.02.77, France No. 7105537, 12.03.73, GFR No. 2106074, 4.02.77, England No. 1308160, 5.10.74, DRG No. 94448, 26.03.73, Italy No. 919843, 5.03.73, Belgium No. 763848, 27.11.71;
  - V.Grachev, V.Gorelov, A. Semushkin. "Mine for melting synthetic slag", А. С. USSR No. 1502626, BI No. 31, 1989;
  - V.Grachev and others. "Mine-reverberatory furnace for melting aluminum and its alloys", А. С. No. 1719838, 15.11.91, B No. 10, 15.03.92;
  - V.Grachev and others. "Injection in-mold inoculation bowl melt". Patent RF No. 2007267, B No. 3, 15.02.94;
  - U.Kudriavsky, V.Grachev, M.Zilberman and others. "Hardware and processing facility for disposal of highly toxic halogenated organic compounds". Patent RF No. 45853, B. No. 15, 27.05.2005.
- Other works on metallurgy:
  - Casting alloys and their melting technology in mechanical engineering: Textbook for engineering schools, specialty "Machines and foundry technology". V.Vozdvyzhensky, V.Grachev, V. Spassky. - Moscow: Mashinostroenie, 1984. - 432 p.
  - N.Girshovich. Handbook in iron casting, 3rd ed., revised L: Mechanical Engineering. Leningrad. Branch, 1978. -758 p.
  - V. Grachev. "Physical, chemical and electrochemical characteristics of phase interaction in secondary smelting of iron". Textbook, Penza, Penza Polytechnic Institute, 1979, 96p.
  - V.Grachev. "Physical and chemical basis of melting iron". Saratov State University, 1981, 208 p.
  - V. Grachev, S. Kazantsev and others. "Furnaces in the foundry industry. Atlas of designs". Textbook for university students, specialty "Casting of ferrous and nonferrous metals" and "Machinery and Technology foundry". M. Mechanical Engineering, 1989. - 156 p.
  - V. Grachev. "Oven foundries". Textbook for high schools. M. MSU 1994, 633 p.
  - V. Grachev, V. Spassky and others. "Casting alloys and their melting technology in mechanical engineering". Textbook for engineering schools. M., Mechanical Engineering, 1990.
- Works on ecology and the environment:
  - V. Grachev, N. Aghajanian and others. "Human Ecology in a Changing World". 2nd Edition, Ekaterinburg: Ural Branch of the Academy of Sciences, 2008. ISBN 5-7691-1950-0.
  - V. Grachev and others. "Ecology". "March", Moscow-Rostov-on-Don, 2006, 768 p.
  - V. Grachev and others. "Ecology. Military ecology". Textbook for high schools, "Kamerton" 2006, 855 p.
  - V.Denisov, V.Gutenev, I.Denisova, V.Grachev and others. "Life Safety". "March", Textbook, Moscow - Rostov-on-Don, 2007.
  - V.Gutenev, L.Denisov, A.Kamishev, V. Grachev and others. "Aerospace Sensing in the system of interaction of environmental safety and facilities". Monograph, Moscow, 2006.
  - V.Azarov, A. Azhgirevich, V.Bondarenko, V. Grachev and others. "Industrial Ecology". "March", Textbook, Moscow, 2007.
  - A.Azhgirevich, V. Gutenev, V.Denisov, V.Grachev and others. "Organization of environmental safety of military activity". Textbook, Moscow, 2007.
  - V. Denisov, A. Kurbatov, I.Denisova, V.Grachev and others. "City ecology". "March", Textbook. Moscow - Rostov-on-Don, 2008.
  - G. Onishchenko, U.Rakhmanin, F. Karmazinov, V.Grachev, E.Nefedova. "Benchmarking of drinking water quality". Monograph, 2010.
  - A.Agapov, V.Grachev and others. "Environmental policy of the State Corporation "Rosatom" / A23, edited by V. Grachev: Center for promotion of social and environmental initiatives in the nuclear industry. 2011.- 350p. ISBN 978-5-91706-035-4.
