= Nizhnyaya Tavda =

Rural locality in Tyumen Oblast, Russia

Coordinates: 57°40′27″N 66°10′47″E

Nizhnyaya Tavda (Russian: Нижняя Тавда) is a rural locality (a selo) and the administrative center of Nizhnetavdinsky District, Tyumen Oblast, Russia. Population: 6,846 (2010 census); 6,754 (2002 census); 6,941 (1989 Soviet census).
