= Vitaliy Aleksandrovich Yuzhilin =

Russian politician

- Вита́лий Алекса́ндрович Южи́лин
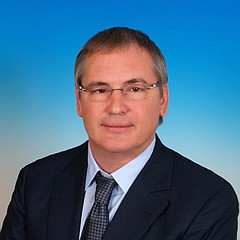
- Yuzhilin in 2003.

Personal details
- Born: December 10, 1965 (age 60) Chelyabinsk, RSFSR
- Education: Admiral Makarov Leningrad Higher Marine College
- Occupation: Port builder, chairman of the Association of Commercial Seaports (2002-2022), Deputy of the State Duma (1999-2016)

Vitaliy Aleksandrovich Yuzhilin (born December 10, 1965, Chelyabinsk, RSFSR) is a State Duma deputy for the third, fourth, fifth, and sixth convocations.

== Biography ==
He graduated from the Admiral Makarov Leningrad Higher Marine College in 1988, with a specialization as an engineer-oceanologist.

== Career ==
In 1988, he took a position at the A.O. Kovalevsky Institute of Biology of the Southern Seas of the Ukrainian SSR Academy of Sciences. He was involved in scientific research and participated in expeditions. He submerged to the bottom of the Black Sea in the deep-sea craft Mir.

Later, he worked as an engineer in the Oceanography Department of the Marine Hydrophysical Institute of the Ukrainian Academy of Sciences.

In 1993, the Nizhnevartovsk Trading House was established, where Vitaliy Yuzhilin became the head of the foreign trade department. In this position, he established contacts with oil refining structures.

In the mid-90s, he entered the stevedoring business, becoming one of the first private investors in the port industry.

In 1997, he joined the Board of Directors of JSC Sea Port of St. Petersburg, where he remained for two years. In 1998, he became a co-owner of the port.

As a businessman, he was involved in the development of cargo transportation: transshipment of oil, chemical cargoes, and container transportation. He invested in the development and construction of ports and also worked on solving social problems in Saint Petersburg.

From 1998 to 2003, he was a deputy of the 3rd State Duma.

He worked on the State Duma Committee on Budget and Taxes.

In 2002, he co-founded the National Container Company. In the same year, Yuzhilin proposed to the administration of Saint Petersburg to build a passenger port on Vasilyevsky Island to receive large liners, to unload the cargo port, and to increase tourist flow. In 2008, the grand opening of the Marine Façade passenger port took place, which became the largest passenger port in Europe.

In 2002, he took the position of chairman of the Board of Directors of the Association of Commercial Seaports. Yuzhilin's main focus was on increasing the competitiveness of domestic ports. During this period, he worked on the text of the Law "On Seaports."

In 2003, he was elected to the State Duma for the fourth convocation for the Kingisepp single-mandate electoral district 101 of the Leningrad Region, and then he was a member of the State Duma Committee on Budget and Taxes.

In 2007, he was re-elected as a deputy of the 5th State Duma. He was a member of the State Duma Committee on Budget and Taxes.

Since 2010, he has been a member of the council of the National Association of Builders (NOSTROY).

From September 2011 to 2016, he was a deputy of the State Duma of the sixth convocation and member of the State Duma Committee on Budget and Taxes.

Since 2016, he has been a member of the board of the self-regulated organization (SRO) Interregional Association of Railway Construction Organizations.

From 2016 to 2018, he was vice president of NOSTROY. In this position, he oversaw the reform of the institute of self-regulation in the construction industry.

Yuzhilin left the post of chairman of the Association of Commercial Seaports in 2022.

He participated in the preparation of the draft for the construction of the Ust-Luga container terminal.

== Personal life ==
He has four children.

His grandmother, Saniya Gabdrakhmanovna Yarulina, was the first woman pilot of the Tatar ASSR. She was part of the Kazan Aeroclub. In 1934, together with her future husband, she made the Red Tatary campaign flight across the districts of the republic.

His grandfather, Alexander Grigorievich Yuzhilin (1917–1976), fought in the World War II as a pilot. He made over 260 flights. During air battles he shot down three enemy fighters. In 1944, he was recognized as a national hero for his valor and heroism.

According to Forbes magazine, as of April 19, 2012, Vitaliy Yuzhilin was ranked 200th among the richest people in the country, with an estimated fortune of $450 million.

== Titles and awards ==
- Honorary badge "For Merit in the Development of Science and Economics" of the Presidium of the Academy of Natural Sciences (2002)
- Medal "For Distinction in Maritime Activities" of the Marine Collegium (2011)
- Order of Friendship (December 3, 2011), for merits in legislative activity and many years of conscientious work
- Badge of distinction of the Union of Transport Workers, 1st degree, for merits in the development of transport (2019)
