= Gubkin Russian State University of Oil and Gas =

Public university in Moscow, Russia

- Росси́йский госуда́рственный университе́т не́фти и га́за и́мени И. М. Гу́бкина
- Type: Public
- Established: 17 April 1930
- President: Viktor Georgievich Martynov
- Rector: Viktor Georgievich Martynov
- Students: 11000
- Postgraduates: 500
- Location: Leninski Prospect 65, Moscow, Russia; 55.692028°N 37.555325°E
- Campus: Urban
- Website: http://gubkin.ru

University rankings

Regional – Overall
- QS Emerging Europe and Central Asia: 197 (2022)

The Gubkin Russian State University of Oil and Gas (Russian: Российский государственный университет нефти и газа имени И. М. Губкина) is a public university in Moscow, Russia. The university was founded in 1930 and is named after the geologist Ivan Gubkin. The university is colloquially known as Kerosinka (Russian: Керосинка), meaning 'kerosene stove'.

Affiliates of the Gubkin institute exist in Orenburg and Tashkent (Uzbekistan).

== Academics ==
=== Faculties and schools ===
==== Petroleum geology and geophysics ====
The work of geologists and geophysicists is complex and multifaceted. Only detailed study of the structure of the Earth's deposits with the use of modern geophysical instruments and computer technologies can confidently identify oil and gas deposits at the depth of several kilometers. The Faculty trains geologists and geophysicists in a variety of areas and specializations of geoscience to meet the industry's needs.

Training is provided by a team of researchers. Among them are Russian State Prize Laureates, Honored Scientists of the Russian Federation, Honored Geologists and Geophysicists. The Faculty offers Bachelor, Master and Ph.D. programs.

Departments

1. Theory of Prospecting and Exploration of Oil and Gas
2. Petroleum Field Geology
3. Geology
4. Geophysical Information Systems
5. Exploration Geophysics and Computer Systems
6. lithology and System Research of Lithosphere
7. Geology of Hydrocarbon Systems

Aleksandr V. Lobusev is author of more than 90 scientific papers. He is also the holder of the patent: "Method of developing oil and gas fields”. He is member of many renowned public organizations: the Society of Petroleum Engineers (SPE); Chairman of the Committee on Science of Gubkin University Academic Council, Public Council of the Ministry of Natural Resources and Ecology of the Russian Federation, full member of the Academy of Natural Sciences of Russia.

==== Reservoir engineering ====
Hydrocarbons are produced in Siberian blistering cold and in violent African heat, deep under the sea and in the desert. It is the reservoir engineer who plays the major role in this process of development and exploitation of oil and gas deposits. The Faculty of Reservoir Engineering prepares professionals in drilling, well completion and simulation, development and exploitation of on- and offshore oil, gas and gas condensate fields, research in physics and hydraulics. Students of the Faculty receive in-depth knowledge in geology, economics, engineering mechanics, oil field chemicals and computer systems.

The Faculty offers a variety of Bachelor, Master and Ph.D. programs.

Departments

1. Oil and Gas Wells Drilling
2. Petroleum Reservoir Engineering
3. Gas and Gas-Condensate Reservoir Engineering
4. Offshore Petroleum Reservoir Engineering
5. Physics
6. Petroleum and Subsurface Fluid Mechanics
7. Gas Technologies and Underground Gas Storage
8. Institute of Hydrocarbon Reservoir Engineering
9. R&D Institute for Drilling Technologies
10. Institute of Arctic Petroleum Technologies

Professor Bondarenko teaches the course on "Physics of oil and gas reservoir." He has published more than 40 scientific works. Professor Bovanenko is the Laureate of the Government of the Russian Federation in the field of Science and Technology, Honorary Person of Higher Professional Education of the Russian Federation.

==== Pipeline engineering, construction and operation ====
Pipeline transport is the most important part of the fuel and energy complex. Often oil and gas fields are located in remote areas. Therefore, the effectiveness of the oil and gas industry is largely dependent on the reliable and safe operation of pipeline systems. The Faculty provides training in a wide range of subjects and programs related to pipeline engineering and operation.

The Faculty includes 75 professors giving lectures to the students on the fundamentals and cutting-edge developments in pipeline engineering.

The Faculty offers Bachelor, Master and Ph.D. programs.

Departments

1. Gas and Oil Pipelines Engineering and Operation
2. Gas and Oil Pipelines and Storage Facilities Construction and Repair
3. Oil Products and Gas Supplies
4. Thermodynamics and Heat Engines
5. Welding and Monitoring of Oil and Gas Facilities

Professor Korolenok is author of over 110 scientific papers and textbooks for students, including 3 monographs and 12 scientific and technical reviews. He is Member of the Scientific and Technical Council of OAO "Gazprom". The research results of professor Korolenok were used to develop a number of industry practices and regulations, which were introduced into the practice of gas transportation companies such as "Gazprom", “Transneft", Rosneftegazstroy and others.

==== Mechanical engineering ====
The question “What do the graduates of the Department of Mechanical Engineering do?” can be answered briefly: they create machinery and installations for the oil and gas industry, and “teach” these how to work. They design and operate equipment, certify petroleum products and technologies, ensure the security of workers life, manage risks related to industrial production, insure industrial objects and people - our graduates can do all this and many other things.

The Faculty offers Bachelor, Master and Ph.D. programs.

Departments

1. Machines and Equipment for Oil and Gas Industry
2. Equipment for Oil Refining and Gas Processing
3. Tribology and Repair Technology of Oil and Gas Equipment
4. Welding and Monitoring of Oil and Gas Facilities
5. Standardization, Certification and Quality Management of Oil and Gas Equipment Manufacturing
6. Wear Resistance of Machines and Equipment & Structural Materials Engineering
7. Industrial Safety and Environment Protection
8. Computer Aided Design of Oil and Gas Industry Facilities
9. Theoretical Mechanics
10. Technical Mechanics
11. Metal Science and Nonmetallic Materials

Other Units

1. National Oil and Gas Institute
2. International Training and Research Center «Anticor»
3. Institute for Safety and Risk Analysis in Oil and Gas Sector
4. Center for Integrated Analytical Studies
5. Center for Advanced Manufacturing and Refurbishing Processes in Gas Sector Equipment

Professor Prygaev is author of more than 60 scientific papers, co-author of international translator and guide "Electrodes for manual arc welding" (2000). In 2012 the International Society for Engineering Education awarded professor Prygaev the title of “International Lecturer in Engineering”. In 2010 professor was awarded the title of the “Honored Person of Higher Education of the Russian Federation”.

==== Chemical and environmental engineering ====
The areas of training offered by the Faculty are extremely diverse. For example, students at the Department of Oil Processing Technologies learn about the technology and processes for the production of petroleum products, explore indicators of quality for oil products and raw materials, develop innovative solutions to improve the energy efficiency of processing plants. The Department of Gas Chemistry looks into the methods for obtaining substances and materials from hydrocarbon gases applying physical and chemical processes. The Department of Chemistry and Technology of Lubricants students master production technologies of motor oils, lubricants and fluids.

The Department of Technology of Chemicals for the Oil and Gas Industry does research in the field of development of drilling fluids, technologies for enhanced oil recovery and oil production intensification. The Department of Organic and Petroleum Chemistry trains specialists in the fields of hydrocarbon chemistry, heteroatomic and high-molecular compounds of petroleum, as well as their thermal and thermo-catalytic transformations. The Department of Physical and Colloid Chemistry students explore chemical phenomena using theoretical and experimental methods of physics. And finally the Department of Industrial Ecology students can master the environmental protection, waste utilization and other green technologies.

The Faculty offers Bachelor, Master and Ph.D. programs.

Departments

1. Chemistry and Technology of Lubricants
2. Organic and Petroleum Chemistry
3. Gas Chemistry
4. Oil Processing Technologies
5. General and Applied Chemistry
6. Physical and Colloid Chemistry
7. Technology of Chemicals for Oil and Gas Industry
8. Industrial Ecology
9. R&D Institute of Field Production Chemistry

Professor Tonkonogov is corresponding member of the Academy of Natural Sciences (2007), author of over 100 scientific works and inventions. Professor Tonkonogov gives lectures on the theory of chemical and technological processes of basic organic and petrochemical synthesis; theoretical foundations of chemical engineering of fuel energy and carbon materials; technology of production.

==== Automation and computer engineering ====
The Faculty of Automation and Computer Engineering prepares specialists in the field of mathematical and computer modeling, design and effective use of computer technology, information-measuring and electrical systems and facilities, tools, automation and control systems. All educational programs of the Faculty are closely related with the tasks of oil and gas industry. The Faculty students receive in-depth training in physics and mathematics, studying information technology, mathematical methods of modeling and analysis of complex systems, acquire knowledge on the technology of designing and programming of modern information-measuring, computing and control systems.

The Faculty offers Bachelor, Master and Ph.D. programs.

Departments

1. Advanced Mathematics
2. Computer Science
3. Automation of Technological Processes
4. Automated Control Systems
5. Theoretical Electrical Engineering and Electrification of Oil and Gas Industry
6. Information and Measuring Systems
7. Applied Mathematics and Computer Simulation

==== Economics and management ====
Graduates of the Faculty are able to successfully address challenges of the oil and gas industry. They work in governmental bodies, oil and gas companies, research and development organizations as economists, managers, financiers, marketers related to the oil and gas industry.

The Faculty of Economics and Management maintains close ties with universities in China, Germany, France, UK, USA, Holland, Norway, Sweden and other countries as well as with the international oil and gas majors such as Gazprom, Rosneft, BP, Statoil and others.

All educational programs in the Faculty are closely related with the tasks of oil and gas industry.

The Faculty offers Bachelor, Master and Ph.D. programs.

Departments

1. Economic Theory
2. Economics of Oil and Gas Industry
3. Industrial Management
4. Personnel and Labor Management
5. Financial Management
6. Economics of Regional Energy and Energy Efficiency
7. Energy Markets Research

==== International oil and gas business ====
In line with the globalization process the petroleum business is becoming more and more international. To manage the business in international oil and gas companies the enrolment of professionals with specific knowledge of doing petroleum business internationally is required.

Therefore, becoming a top manager of oil and gas companies requires comprehensive education. The Faculty of International Oil and Gas Business offers Bachelor, Master and Ph.D. programs in the areas of Petroleum Economics and Management, Energy Trading, Energy Logistics, World Economy, Geopolitics and Strategic Resource Management.

Departments

1. Oil and gas business
2. Strategic management of energy
3. World economy and energy policy
4. Energy trading and logistics
5. Innovative management
6. International school of business

==== School of law ====
The study at the Gubkin School of Law gives students general and specific knowledge in the field of jurisprudence. Along with the general legal studies much attention is paid to the specificity of legal activities of enterprises and organizations in the oil and gas industry. The industry professionals from major oil and gas companies such as Gazprom, BP, Shell, TOTAL, and Governmental bodies (Supreme Court, Ministry of Natural Resources and Environment and others) as well as the experts of law and consulting firms (DLA Piper, Noland Consulting, Bureau of labor law) give the lectures in the school.

The Faculty offers Bachelor, Master and Ph.D. programs.

Departments

1. Theory and History of State and Law
2. Civil and Labor Law
3. Civil Practice and Social branches of Law
4. Natural Resource and Environmental Law
5. Financial and Administrative Law
6. Criminal Law and Criminology

==== School of humanities ====
In addition to training students the school provides the russian Language training course for international students in the framework of a one-year preparatory course.

The school's main task is to develop in students’ patriotism, civic responsibility and team spirit, as well as their capability to maintain and contribute to the university and the national oil and gas sector traditions. The school includes the Museum of History of Gubkin Russian State University of Oil and Gas.

Departments

1. Philosophy and Social and Political Technologies
2. History
3. Physical Education
4. Russian Language
5. Modern Languages
6. Engineering Pedagogy

==== International school of business ====
International School of Business offers business education aimed at improving management skills and development of leadership qualities, according to the global standards of training managers for oil, gas and energy business. The knowledge and skills obtained in the school effectively address the challenges faced by senior managers of the international petroleum companies.

The school offers the Master (MBA) and Doctoral (DBA) degrees in business administration.

=== Degrees and programs ===
==== Bachelors ====
Gubkin offers a wide range of Bachelor (4 years of study) programs related to various fields in the petroleum industry such as geology and petroleum engineering, mining law, petroleum economics and management, law and others. All Bachelor Programs are Russian taught.

To learn the Russian Language in Gubkin, please refer to the one-year PREPARATORY COURSE Program.

==== Master programs ====
Gubkin offers more than 50 Master Programs in all possible areas of Petroleum Industry. The duration of Master Programs is 2 years (4 semesters).

These include regular Gubkin programs which are all Russian taught as well as Joint Master Programs which are English taught.

==== Doctoral programs ====
Gubkin offers the opportunity to receive the degree of Candidate of Science (Ph.D.) in 17 scientific areas related to the petroleum industry, such as development, exploration, production, transportation, economics and others. In this scientific framework the university offers 44 programs/majors to do the Ph.D. research in.

== International cooperation ==
=== Academic cooperation ===
University partners

China is now believed to be the only country with a university partnering.

== History ==
There was a task in the USSR – to prepare 435,000 engineers and technicians in 5 years (1930-1935) during the USSR industrialization period, while their number in 1929 was 66,000.

In 1930 the Moscow Mining Academy was divided into six independent institutes by the order of Supreme Soviet of the National Economy. The Petroleum Engineering Department of the Moscow Mining Academy became the base for the new Moscow Petroleum Institute. The Institute was named in honor of Academician Ivan Gubkin, “who contributed greatly to the foundation of higher education aimed at (of training engineers, needed urgently for the socialist industry”. At this time the young Soviet state was in want of fuel and energy for industrial development. The petroleum industry faced new challenges such as the development of new fields, application of advanced methods of operation, introduction of new production technologies, further development of oil refining technologies and construction of new plants, electrification of the oil industry, as well as the planning, organization and improving the safety of petroleum production. None of these problems could be solved without significant increase in the number of petroleum engineers and Gubkin Institute became the main base for preparing such specialists.

At the beginning there were only three faculties at the university, namely: Geology and Oil Exploration, Petroleum Engineering and Refining. The first Rector of the university and the founders of its educational and research schools was its namesake Ivan M. Gubkin.

From 1941 to 1943, during World War II, the university was evacuated to Ufa.

Nowadays there are more than ten teaching faculties at Gubkin preparing specialists in almost every field of the petroleum industry: from petroleum geology and engineering to energy economics and trading. Since the university's establishment more than 85,000 students have been graduated from Gubkin.

== Notable alumni ==
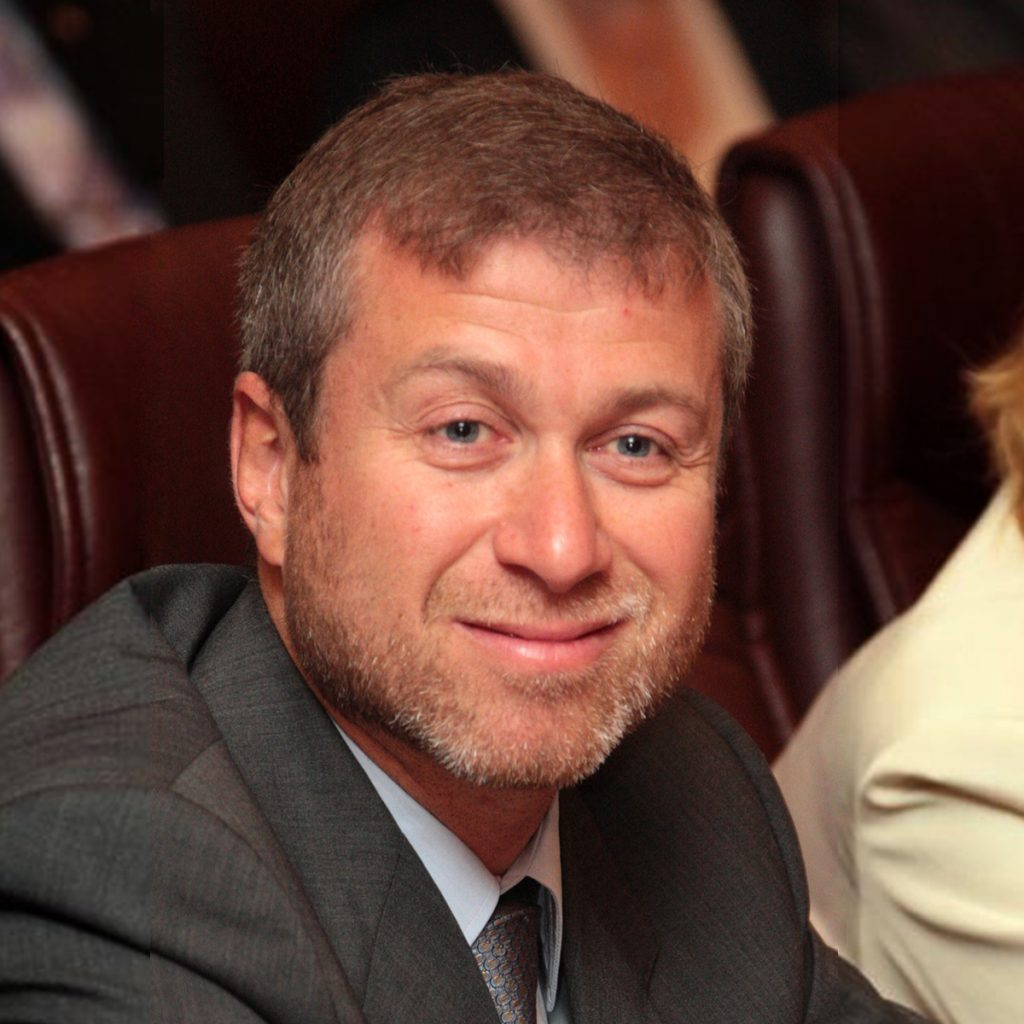
Roman Abramovich

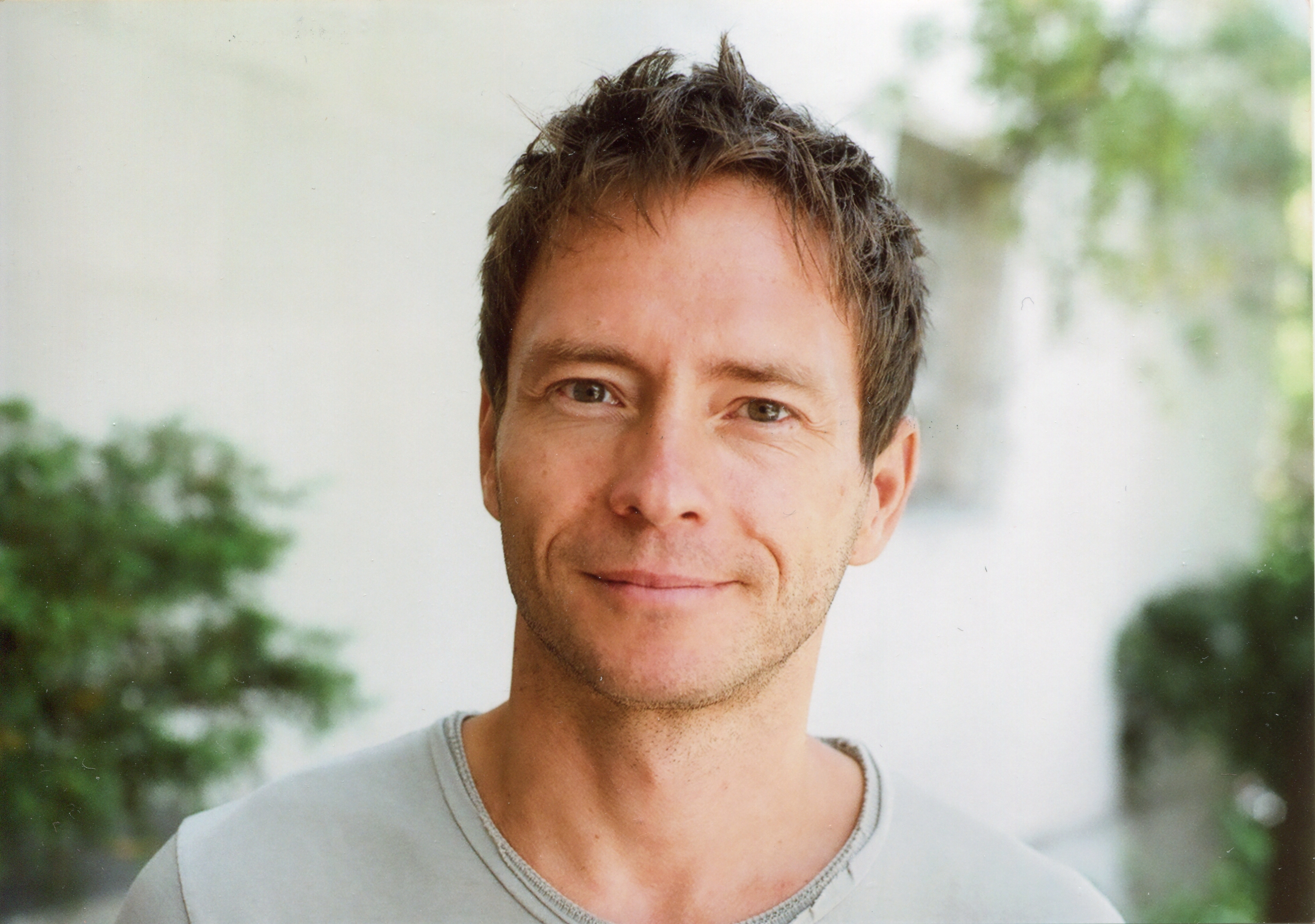
Edward Frenkel

- Roman Abramovich – Russian-Israeli billionaire businessman, investor, and politician. Owner of the private investment company Millhouse LLC and former owner of Chelsea Football Club.
- Mikhail Gutseriev – Russian billionaire of Ingush descent.
- Teki Biçoku – Albanian geologist
- Sergey Donskoy – politician
- Vladimir Entov – applied mathematician and physicist
- Pavel Etingof - Russian-American mathematician
- Edward Frenkel – Russian-American mathematician
- Alexander Givental – Russian-American mathematician
- Vladimir Gusinsky - media tycoon
- Vladislav Ignatov – businessman and politician
- Yury Luzhkov – politician who was the Mayor of Moscow and one of the founders of the ruling United Russia party
- Mikhail Men - statesman, entrepreneur, musician, composer, producer
- Aliya Mustafina – gymnast
- Leonid Nevzlin – Russian-born Israeli former executive at Yukos, also owns 20% of Haaretz
- Vasiliy Podshibyakin – discoverer of Urengoy gas field the world's second largest natural gas field
- Urban Rusnák – Slovak diplomat and the current general-secretary of the Energy Charter Secretariat
- Fazila Samadova - academic, chemical engineer technologist
- Eugene Shvidler – Russian-American oil businessman
- Vladimir Sorokin – writer and dramatist
- Arkady Volozh – Israeli founder and CEO of Yandex

== See also ==
- List of Russian geologists
