= Vladislav Ignatov =

Russian politician (1958–2015)

- Владислав Игнатов

Auditor of Accounts Chamber of the Russian Federation
- In office 5 April 2001 – 18 February 2005

Personal details
- Born: 8 March 1958 Moscow, Soviet Union, now Russia
- Died: 23 September 2015 Moscow
- Education: Gubkin Russian State University of Oil and Gas

Vladislav Mikhailovich Ignatov (Russian: Владисла́в Миха́йлович Игна́тов; 8 March 1958 – 23 September 2015, Moscow) was a Russian businessman and politician. Ignatov was the auditor of Accounts Chamber of Russia from 2001 to 2005.

In 1990s was the co-owner and the president of "Vastom" ltd.

During 1999–2001, he worked as a deputy in the State Duma of the Federal Assembly of the Russian Federation, the 3rd convocation as a member of Liberal Democratic Party of Russia fraction. Was on the Budget and Tax Committee. Considered imposition of the death penalty for drug dealing.

From 2001 to 2003 Ignatov was the head of the non-governmental organization National Anti-corruption committee (NAK).

Served as the auditor of Accounts Chamber of Russia from 2001 to 2005. His role was to control over accounting, privatization and management of state property. In 2003 Vladislav investigated the privatization of the "Bashneft" oil company and found great violations. The case was closed only in 2014 when the government arrested the company's stock.

In 2007 lost the State Duma elections in Murmansk.

Later was the head of the Russian investment company "Terakon" with different business interests.

Ignatov died from leukemia on 23 September 2015.
