= Nizhnetavdinsky District =

Nizhnetavdinsky District Нижнетавдинский район (Russian)
- District
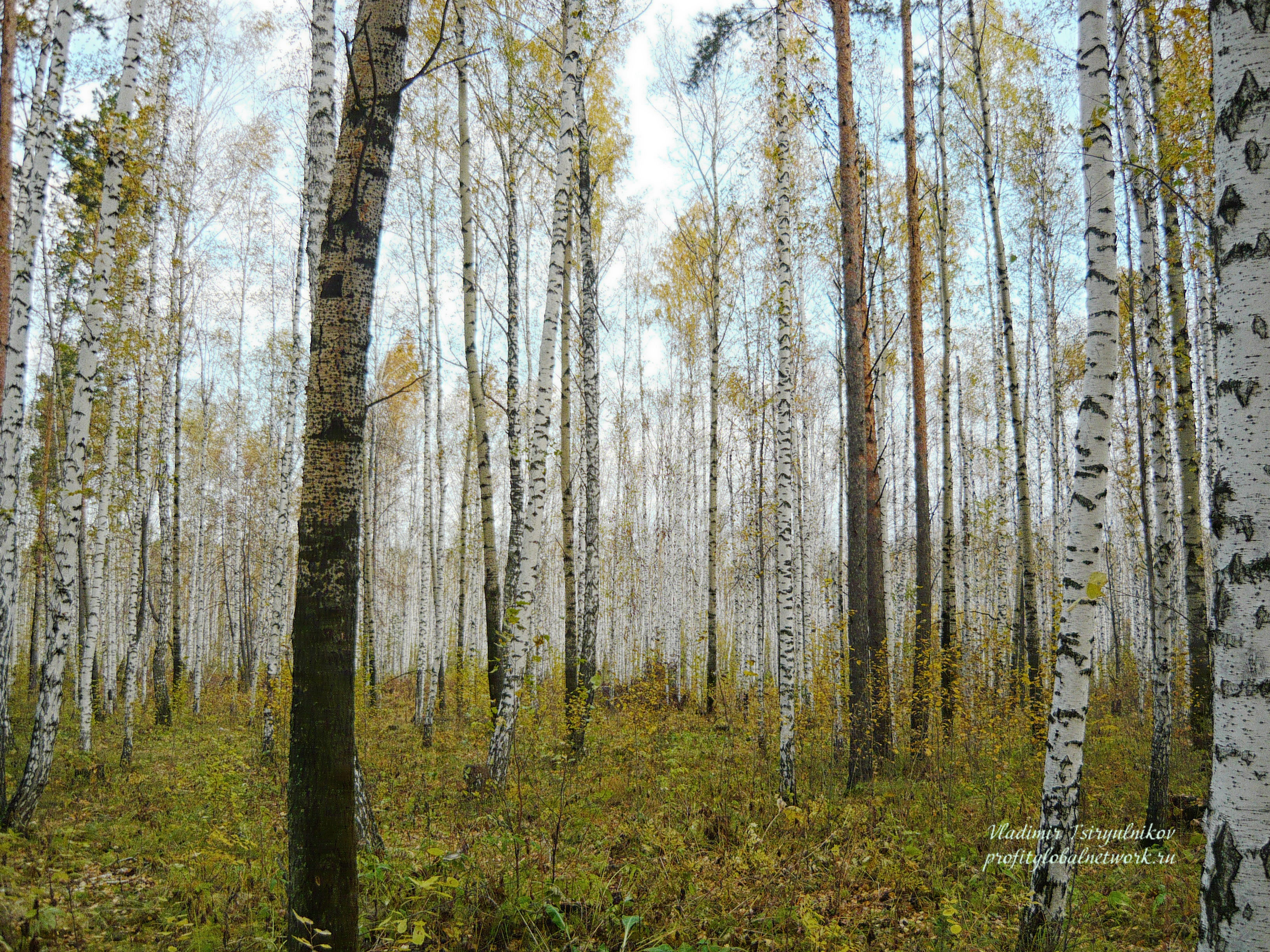
- Birch forest, Nizhnetavdinsky District

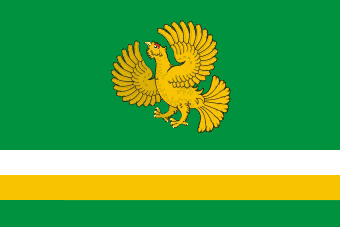
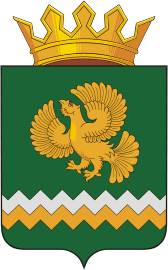
- Flag Coat of arms
- Location of Nizhnetavdinsky District in Tyumen Oblast
- Coordinates: 57°40′28″N 66°10′25″E
- Country: Russia
- Federal subject: Tyumen Oblast
- Established: 1923
- Administrative center: Nizhnyaya Tavda

Area
  - Total: 7,360 km^{2} (2,840 sq mi)

Population (2010 Census)
  - Total: 23,048
  - Density: 3.13/km^{2} (8.11/sq mi)
  - Urban: 0%
  - Rural: 100%

Administrative structure
  - Administrative divisions: 17 Rural okrugs
  - Inhabited localities: 78 rural localities

Municipal structure
  - Municipally incorporated as: Nizhnetavdinsky Municipal District
  - Municipal divisions: 0 urban settlements, 17 rural settlements
- Time zone: UTC+5 (MSK+2)
- OKTMO ID: 71632000
- Website: http://ntavda.admtyumen.ru/

Nizhnetavdinsky District (Russian: Нижнетавди́нский райо́н) is an administrative district (raion), one of the twenty-two in Tyumen Oblast, Russia. As a municipal division, it is incorporated as Nizhnetavdinsky Municipal District. It is located in the west of the oblast. The area of the district is 7,360 square kilometers (2,840 sq mi). Its administrative center is the rural locality (a selo) of Nizhnyaya Tavda. Population: 23,048 (2010 Census); 24,066 (2002 census); 26,972 (1989 Soviet census). The population of Nizhnyaya Tavda accounts for 29.7% of the district's total population.
