= Vladimir Nikitin (politician) =

Russian politician

- Владимир Никитин
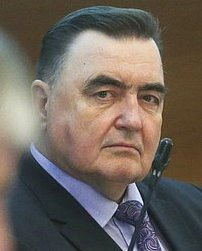
- Nikitin in 2018

Member of Parliament in the State Duma
- In office 1995 – 21 April 2015

Personal details
- Born: Vladimir Stepanovich Nikitin; 5 April 1948 (age 78) Opochka, Russia, Soviet Union
- Party: Communist Party of the Russian Federation
- Children: 2

Vladimir Stepanovich Nikitin (Russian: Владимир Степанович Никитин; born on 5 April 1948) is a Russian politician, who was a member of parliament, a deputy of the State Duma from 1995 to 2015, and had been a long time member since the second convocation. He is a member of the Communist Party of the Russian Federation (CPRF). He had been the First Secretary of the Pskov Regional Committee of the Communist Party of the Soviet Union from 1990 to 1991 and later for the CPRF from 1995 to 2005, and 2008 to 2012. He is a chairman of the Central Control and Auditing Commission of the Communist Party from 2000 to 2013, and member of the Presidium of the Central Committee of the Communist Party from 2013 to 2017.

== Biography ==
Vladimir Nikitin was born on 5 April 1948 in the town of Opochka. In 1971, he graduated from the Leningrad Institute of Railway Engineers with a degree in civil engineering. He served in the Soviet army, and was a platoon commander of a separate bridge battalion of railway troops.

From 1973 to 1964, he was a senior design engineer at the Pskovgrazhdanproekt Institute in Velikiye Luki, Pskov Oblast. From 1974 to 1977, he was the head of the organizational department, the first secretary of the Velikie Luki city committee of the Komsomol of the Pskov Oblast. From 1977 to 1983, he was the Head of the Department of Construction and Municipal Services, and the Second Secretary of the Velikie Luki City Committee of the CPSU. In 1983, he was the head of the construction department of the Pskov Regional Committee of the CPSU. In September 1986, Nikitin was elected first secretary of the Pskov city committee of the CPSU.

In March 1990, he ran for people's deputies of the RSFSR in the Pskov urban territorial district, but was not elected. In 1990, he was elected a deputy and chairman of the Pskov City Council. On 26 October 1990, Nikitin was elected first secretary of the Pskov regional committee of the CPSU.

In 1991, he graduated from the Academy of Social Sciences under the Central Committee of the CPSU. He received a PhD in economics.

Between 1992 and 1996, he was director of the construction and commercial firm Pskovskoe Vozrozhdenie, and chairman of the board of the Pskov branch of the Russian Fund for Assistance to Refugees Compatriots.

In 1995. Nikitin became a member of the Central Committee of the Communist Party of the Russian Federation. He still at that time was the, First Secretary of the Pskov Regional Committee of the Communist Party. That same year, he was elected to the State Duma of the second convocation on the list of the Communist Party of the Russian Federation (Nevsko-Baltic regional group, No. 3). He worked in the committee for CIS Affairs and Relations with Compatriots. He was the chairman of the Pskov regional branch of the People's Patriotic Union of Russia, and a member of the coordination council. In April 1997, he was re-elected a member of the Central Committee of the Communist Party of the Russian Federation.

In 1999, Nikitin was elected to the State Duma of the third convocation. He became a member of the Committee on CIS Affairs and Relations with Compatriots, Chairman of the Subcommittee on Refugees and Internally Displaced Persons.

Between 3 December 2000 and 24 February 2013, Nikitin was the Chairman of the Central Control and Auditing Commission of the Communist Party.

In 2003, he again was elected to the State Duma of the fourth convocation. He was deputy committee for CIS affairs and relations with compatriots. He was a member of the State Duma delegation to the permanent parliamentary conference of the Baltic Sea countries, at the last meeting he was elected vice president of the conference.

In 2005, he left the post of the first secretary of the Pskov regional committee of the Communist Party of the Russian Federation.

In 2007, he once again was elected to the State Duma of the fifth convocation on the electoral list of the Communist Party of the Russian Federation in the Pskov Oblast.

In 2008, he was re-elected first secretary of the Pskov regional committee of the Communist Party.

In 2011, he was elected to the State Duma of the sixth convocation from the electoral list of the Communist Party of the Russian Federation in the Pskov Oblast. That time, he was elected 1st Deputy Chairman of the State Duma Committee for the Commonwealth of Independent States and Relations with Compatriots.

On 7 April 2012, he again left the post of First Secretary of the Pskov Regional Committee. At the plenum of the regional committee, he motivated the resignation by the workload at the post of the first deputy chairman of the Duma committee and preparations for the congress of the movement "Russian Lad".

On 24 February 2013, Nikitin left the post of chairman of the Central Committee of the Communist Party of the Russian Federation and became a member of the Central Committee of the Communist Party, and was elected a member of the Presidium of the Central Committee of the Communist Party, he held this position until the 17th Congress of the Communist Party of the Russian Federation, on 27 May 2017.

On 21 April 2015, Niktin prematurely resigned as a State Duma member. The vacant mandate passed to Igor Revin.

=== Criticisms ===
==== Neo-Trotskyism ====
Nikitin is considered the author of the concept of "neo-Trotskyism" as a generalized name for a set of ideological currents in the Communist Party of the Russian Federation, directed, according to a number of members of the leadership of the Communist Party of the Russian Federation, against raising the "Russian question" in the party, including against the theory of so-called "Russian socialism". This term in this sense arose in 2007 in the decree of the Plenum of the Central Committee of the Communist Party of the Russian Federation "On the danger of neo-Trotskyist manifestations in the Communist Party.".

The resolution of the Plenum of the Central Committee of the Communist Party of the Russian Federation "On the danger of neo-Trotskyist manifestations in the Communist Party of the Russian Federation" states that neo-Trotskyism is a continuation of Trotskyism, and the work of Stalinism, "Trotskyism and Leninism" is cited as proof of this. Among the signs of neo-Trotskyism, the Plenum of the Central Committee of the Communist Party of the Russian Federation indicated the following:

- lack of real partisanship and unwillingness to bind oneself to the norms of the Program and the Party Charter;
- a tendency towards leftist revolutionary phrase-mongering while stubbornly striving for an alliance with extreme right-wing forces;
- ignoring the fundamental interests and rights of the Russian people;
- the desire to generate distrust in the leaders of the party and get rid of the staunch communists.

==== Other general criticisms ====
Representative of the Russian Communist Workers' Party - Russian Party of Communists, S. Bobrov, in his article "Transformation of the ideology of the Communist Party of the Russian Federation", characterized Nikitin's views as follows.

It would not be worthwhile to quote this openly anti-communist, civilizationist nonsense for so long if it had not been uttered by one of the most prominent leaders of the party, the chairman of the Central Committee of the Communist Party of the Russian Federation, and if it had not been published by the official party media. From the above quotations it is clear that Nikitin essentially proposes to throw all of Marxism with its class struggle into the trash heap, replacing the class struggle with the struggle of civilizations. Undoubtedly, V.S. Nikitin is the most prominent subverter of scientific communism in general and Marxism in particular from the leadership of the Communist Party of the Russian Federation.

— S. Borbov

According to the BBC Russian Service in the spring of 2012, the chairman of the Central Control Commission of the Communist Party of the Russian Federation, Nikitin, is "in the opinion of many, the second person in the party." He himself told them in an interview that the Russian communists did not intend to give up their associations with Stalin, but they value him not for repression, but as a nationally oriented statesman.

=== Sanctions ===
He was sanctioned by the UK government in 2014 in relation to the Russo-Ukrainian War.

== Personal life ==
He is married to Valentina Nikolayevna Nikitina.

He is fond of picking mushrooms, fishing, jogging, swimming and singing with a guitar. He is fluent in English.
