= Vladimir Lushin =

Russian footballer and manager

Personal information
- Full name: Vladimir Mikhailovich Lushin
- Date of birth: 10 September 1962 (age 64)
- Height: 1.80 m (5 ft 11 in)
- Position: Defender

Senior career*
Years	Team	Apps	(Gls)
1980–1983	FC Rostselmash Rostov-on-Don	110	(4)
1984	FC SKA Rostov-on-Don	1	(0)
1985	FC Atommash Volgodonsk	26	(2)
1986	FC Spartak Ordzhonikidze	5	(0)
1986–1988	FC Tsement Novorossiysk	99	(3)
1989	FC Kuban Krasnodar	14	(0)
1989–1990	FC SKA Rostov-on-Don	33	(0)
1990	FC Metallurg Lipetsk	28	(0)
1991–1993	FC Zhemchuzhina Sochi	75	(1)
1993	→ FC Torpedo Adler (loan)	2	(0)
1994	FC Khimik Belorechensk	6	(0)
1995	FC Gazovik-Gazprom Izhevsk	4	(0)
- * Club domestic league appearances and goals

Vladimir Mikhailovich Lushin (Russian: Владимир Михайлович Лушин; born 10 September 1962) is a former Russian football player and referee.

== Referee career ==
Assistant referee

- Russian Third League: 1996–1997
- Russian Second Division: 1997–2001
- Russian First Division: 1997–2001

Referee

- Russian Third League: 1996–1997
- Russian Second Division: 1997–2006
- Russian First Division: 2000–2006
