= Alexander Sizov =

Russian politician (1948–2026)

- Александр Сизов

Deputy of the State Duma
- In office 18 January 2000 – 24 December 2007

Personal details
- Born: 12 September 1948 Buysky District, Kostroma Oblast, Russian SFSR, USSR
- Died: October 2026 (aged 78) Yaroslavl, Russia
- Party: United Russia
- Profession: Politician

Alexander Alexandrovich Sizov (Russian: Александр Александрович Сизов; 12 September 1948 – October 2026) was a Russian politician who was a deputy of the State Duma from 2000 to 2007.

Sizov died in Yaroslavl in October 2026, at the age of 78.
