= Konstantin Dyulgerov =

Russian businessman

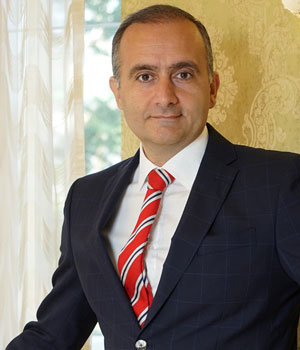
- Born: Konstantin Ivanovich Dyulgerov; July 27, 1971 (age 54); Izmail, Ukraine, Soviet Union
- Occupation(s): Russian politician and public figure

Konstantin Ivanovich Dyulgerov (born July 27, 1971, in Izmail) is an entrepreneur, founder of a large retail network, co-owner of realty management companies and other commercial organizations. Dyulgerov is a co-founder of a large Russian travel fares aggregator. Permanently resides in Ukraine.

Dyulgerov was put on the international wanted list by Russian law enforcement agencies under the charges of fraud (Article 159 of the Criminal Code) and bribery of witnesses (Article 390 of the Criminal Code of the Russian Federation).

In February 2018, Dyulgerov, along with the 16 other major Russian businessmen was included in the "Titov's list", compiled by the Russian Presidential Representative for the Rights of Entrepreneurs, Boris Titov. The aim of the list is organizing the return of the entrepreneurs to Russia and reviewing the doubtful criminal cases brought against them.

Dyulgerov is an active supporter of Russian opposition movement, he participated in several major protest actions. He regularly publicly criticizes the actions of Russian government.

== Biography ==
=== Early life ===
Konstantin Dyulgerov was born on July 27, 1971, in Izmail, Odesa region, Ukraine. His mother Diana Alexandrovna Dyulgerova worked as a gynecologist, and his father Ivan Ivanovich Dyulgerov was a mechanical engineer.

In 1988 Konstantin Dyulgerov graduated from the secondary school No. 7 of the city of Izmail, after which in 1989 he started education in the Izmail Nautical school. However, a year later he entered the Kirovohrad Institute of Agricultural Engineering. Upon graduation, he moved to his permanent residence in Nizhnevartovsk, Khanty-Mansi Autonomous Okrug, where he lived for a long time before starting his own business.

=== Business career ===
Since the 90s, Konstantin Dyulgerov started growing his business in Khanty-Mansi Autonomous Okrug. He is a founder of several companies working in various areas. In 1996, he founded OOO Konst (retail and wholesale trade in motor vehicles); In 1997, OOO Magnon (real estate management); In 2001, ZAO Samotlor (later OOO Trading Company Samotlor); In 2002 ZAO Special Electronic (real estate management); In 2003 OOO Siberian Industrial Center (Legal activities).

As a result of these business activities, Dyulgerov created the production facilities and an extensive network of stores selling consumer goods: furniture, cosmetics, food, etc. At the same time, Dulgerov's companies owned property like warehouses, production shops, stores. Dyulgerov is also the owner of one of the largest travel fare aggregators in the Russian segment of the Internet.

=== Public activity ===
Since 2008, Dyulgerov actively participates in opposition activities and anti-corruption movement. In 2008, Dyulgerov gave his first series of public speeches, in which he exposed and sharply criticized the acting authorities and law enforcement structures of the region. He voiced the accusations of conspiracy, extortion, and corruption, claiming that he refused the offers of "paid protection" suggested by the local law enforcement officials. The exposing facts voiced by Dulgerov provoked public resonance in the region.

Later, Dyulgerov actively participated in the various protest movement activities, including the biggest – the March of Millions, a rally on Academician Sakharov Avenue and others. Dyulgerov was providing financial assistance to Russian non-systemic opposition.

In recent years, Dyulgerov has regularly criticized the authorities on the widely discussed issues, including the non-admission of Russian athletes to the Olympics, the failure of import substitution policy and food security, the political and economic structure of Russia.

=== Criminal prosecution ===
In 2008, law enforcement authorities launched criminal proceedings against Dyulgerov on suspicion of fraud. In 2010 the case was terminated, however, in 2011 the investigation was resumed. According to the investigation, Konstantin Dyulgerov illegally appropriated the share of Sergey Kiryanov, the second founder of OOO Samotlor Trading Company. After lengthy arbitration proceedings, Kiryanov's 49% share was returned to him. However, the criminal case against Dyulgerov was never terminated. It is also known that Sergei Kiryanov is the son-in-law of Nikolai Brykin, ex-general of the Ministry of Internal Affairs and tax police, who is now a deputy of the State Duma from the "United Russia" party.

In 2013, as a result, after receiving charges of fraud, Dyulgerov moved to the United States, as he claimed, to escape the political and criminal persecution. According to Dyulgerov, the said disputed share of Sergei Kiryanov was actually a payment for the enforced "protection". When he refused to pay, they accused him of trying to steal Kiryanov's share. In 2014, another criminal case was launched against him. He is accused of allegedly bribing the witness and compelling him to testify (Article 390 of the Criminal Code of the Russian Federation). Following this, Dyulgerov was put on the international wanted list. Dyulgerov denies all charges, declaring his innocence.

In February 2018, Dyulgerov was included in the "Titov's list" which contains, at the time of publication, the names of 16 businessmen who are being persecuted by Russian law enforcement. According to Boris Titov, the entrepreneurs included in the list were persecuted for dubious reasons, criminal cases against them must be carefully examined and reviewed. The list was submitted to the Administration of the President of Russia, with the official confirmation of its reception and acceptance for consideration.
