= Ernest Valeev =

Russian politician

Ernest Valeev MP
- Эрнест Валеев
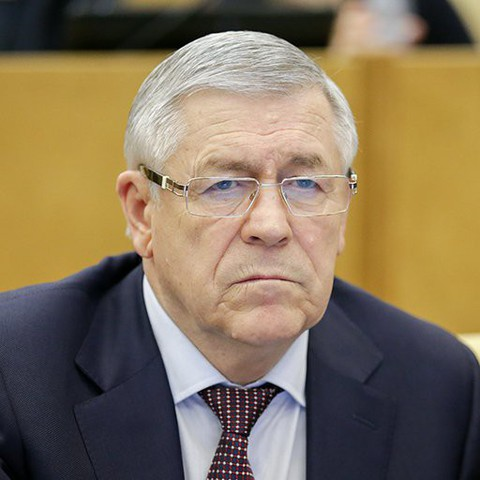

Member of the State Duma (Party List Seat)
- Incumbent
- Assumed office 12 October 2021
- In office 21 December 2011 – 5 October 2016

Member of the State Duma for Tyumen Oblast
- In office 5 October 2016 – 12 October 2021
- Preceded by: constituency re-established
- Succeeded by: Nikolai Brykin
- Constituency: Tyumen (No. 185)

Personal details
- Born: 7 April 1950 (age 76) Novyy Kamay, Agryzsky District, Tatar ASSR, Russian SFSR, Soviet Union
- Party: United Russia
- Education: Ural State Law University

Ernest Abdulovich Valeev (Russian: Эрнест Абдулович Валеев; born 7 April 1950) is a Russian political figure and a deputy of the 6th, 7th, and 8th State Dumas.

At the age of 18, Valeev served at the Soviet Armed Forces. After graduating from the Ural State Law University in 1974, he was sent by distribution to the Tyumen Oblast to work at the local prosecutor's office. In 1976, he became the prosecutor of the Yurginsky District. From 1988 to 1993, he served as First Deputy District Attorney. From 1993 to 2007, he was the prosecutor of the Tyumen Oblast. He left the post on 2 February 2007, as he was appointed an advisor to the Deputy Prosecutor General of the Russian Federation Yury Chaika. On 4 December 2011, he was elected deputy of the 6th State Duma from the Tyumen Oblast constituency. In 2016 and 2021, he was re-elected for the 7th, and 8th State Dumas, respectively.

== Sanctions ==
He was sanctioned by the UK government in 2022 in relation to the Russo-Ukrainian War.
