= Soldatskoye, Voronezh Oblast =

Soldatskoye Солдатское
- Selo
- Location within Voronezh Oblast Location within Russia
- Coordinates: 51°02′N 38°58′E
- Country: Russia
- Region: Voronezh Oblast
- District: Ostrogozhsky District
- Time zone: UTC+3:00

Soldatskoye (Russian: Солдатское) is a rural locality (a selo) and the administrative center of Petrenkovskoye Rural Settlement, Ostrogozhsky District, Voronezh Oblast, Russia. The population was 543 as of 2010. There are 22 streets.

== Geography ==
Soldatskoye is located on the left bank of the Potudan River, 24 km north of Ostrogozhsk (the district's administrative centre) by road. Prilepy is the nearest rural locality.
