= People's Party of the Russian Federation =

People's Party of the Russian Federation Народная Партия Российской Федерации
- Leader: Gennady Gudkov
- Founder: Gennady Raikov
- Founded: 19 December 1999 (as parliamentary group); 29 September 2001
- Dissolved: 14 April 2007
- Merged into: A Just Russia
- Headquarters: 39th Building, Nizhnyaya Krasnoselskaya Street, Moscow, Russia. 107066
- Ideology: Civic nationalism Lobbyism
- Political position: Big tent
- Colours: Yellow; Blue
- Seats in the 3rd State Duma (1999–2003): 58 / 450
- Seats in the 4th State Duma (2003–2007): 17 / 450

Website
- narod-party.ru

The People's Party of the Russian Federation (Note: Russian: Народная партия Российской Федерации (НПРФ), romanized: Narodnaja partija Rossijskoj Federacii (NPRF), IPA: [nɐˈrodnəjə ˈpartʲɪjə rɐˈsʲijskəj fʲɪdʲɪˈratsɨɪ (ˌɛnˌpɛˌɛrˌɛf)]) was a centrist political party in Russia. The leader of the party was Gennady Raikov.

== History ==
Before official registration of the People's Party on 29 September 2001, the "People's Deputy" group (Note: Russian: депутатская группа «Народный депутат», romanized: deputatskaja gruppa «Narodnyj deputat», IPA: [dʲɪpʊˈtatskəjə ˈɡrup(ː)ə nɐˈrodnɨj dʲɪpʊˈtat]) existed in the 3rd State Duma. It included 58 deputies. Most of them later became members of the People's Party of the Russian Federation. The "People's Deputy" consisted of independent members of the State Duma elected exclusively in single-mandate constituencies. The faction supported the initiatives of the new President of Russia Vladimir Putin.

At the 2003 parliamentary election which saw the election of the fourth convocation of the State Duma, the party had won 1.2% of the popular vote and 16 out of 450 seats. Most deputies were elected in single mandate districts and later joined United Russia faction.

The People's Party joined A Just Russia on 14 April 2007.
