= Aleksandr Shvetsov =

Russian footballer

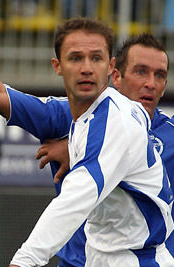
- Aleksandr Shvetsov in 2007.

Personal information
- Full name: Aleksandr Vasilyevich Shvetsov
- Date of birth: 17 December 1980 (age 45)
- Place of birth: Moscow, Russian SFSR
- Height: 1.83 m (6 ft 0 in)
- Position: Midfielder

Youth career
- FC Dynamo Moscow

Senior career*
Years	Team	Apps	(Gls)
1998–2001	PFC CSKA Moscow	1	(0)
2001–2004	FC Khimki	116	(12)
2005–2006	FC Tom Tomsk	11	(0)
2005	→ FC Anzhi Makhachkala (loan)	17	(0)
2006	FK Jūrmala	19	(1)
2007–2008	FC Krylia Sovetov Samara	15	(1)
2008	→ FC Torpedo Moscow (loan)	2	(0)
2008	FC Sibir Novosibirsk	13	(0)
2009	FC Khimki	1	(0)
2010	FC Vityaz Podolsk	13	(1)
2010	FC Avangard Kursk	10	(0)
2011	FC Luch-Energiya Vladivostok	0	(0)
2012–2013	FC Dolgoprudny	18	(1)
2013–2016	FC Dolgoprudny-2		

Managerial career
- 2013–2016: FC Dolgoprudny (director)
- * Club domestic league appearances and goals

Aleksandr Vasilyevich Shvetsov (Russian: Александр Васильевич Швецов; born 17 December 1980) is a Russian former footballer.
