= Aleksandr Shvetsov (politician) =

Russian politician

- Александр Швецов

Member of the Chita Oblast Duma
- In office 24 October 2004 – 2007

Member of the State Duma
- In office 19 December 1999 – 7 December 2003

Personal details
- Born: Aleksandr Sergeyvich Shvetsov; 10 February 1951; Plastun, Russian SFSR, Soviet Union
- Died: 27 April 2008 (aged 57); Chita, Russia
- Political party: Communist Party of the Russian Federation

Aleksandr Sergeyvich Shvetsov (Russian: Александр Сергеевич Швецов; 10 February 1951 - 27 April 2008), was a Russian politician who had served as a member of the Chita Oblast Duma from 2004 to 2007.

He also served a member of the State Duma's third convocation from 1999 to 2003.

== Biography ==
Aleksandr Shvetsov was born in Plastun, Primorsky Krai on 2 February 1951. In 1973, he graduated from the Far Eastern Polytechnic Institute with a degree in mine engineering.

On 19 December 1999, Shevtsov was elected a member of the State Duma's third convocation on the party lists of the Communist Party of the Russian Federation, and was a member of its faction, and was the deputy chairman of the Committee on Natural Resources and Nature Management. He left the parliament on 7 December 2003.

On 26 October 2004, Shvetsov was elected as a member of the Chita Oblast Duma's fourth convocation, headed the Communist Party of the Russian Federation, and was a member of the standing committee of state structure and local self-government, serving until 2007, as a result of the merger of Chita Oblast and Agin-Buryat Autonomous Okrug after a referendum held on the issue on 11 March 2007, creating Zabaykalsky Krai a year later.

Shvetsov died in Chita on 27 April 2008.
