= Yegor Solomatin =

Russian politician

Yegor Yurevich Solomatin (Russian: Егор Юрьевич Соломатин, also transliterated Yegor Yurievich Solomatin; born October 3, 1964) is a member of the State Duma of Russia. He is currently a member of the State Duma's Committee on Budget Issues and Taxes. He is a member of the Liberal Democratic Party of Russia (LDPR) and is its First Deputy Chief. Solomatin has a degree from the Moscow Energy Power Institute.

== Biography ==
In 1988, he graduated from the Moscow Power Engineering Institute with a degree in Systems Engineering.

From 1988 to 1991, he worked as an engineer-instructor at the All-Union Intersectoral Scientific and Educational Center for Computer Technology and Informatics.

From 1991 to 1995, he was Director of Euroinvest JSC (Moscow) and served as Chairman of the Board of Directors of Financial Center JSC (Moscow).

From 1995 to 2007, he was a Deputy of the State Duma of the II, III, and IV convocations representing the LDPR faction.

He currently serves as Vice President of the Sindika Group of Companies.
