= Maxim Korobov =

Russian businessman (born 1957)

Maxim Leonidovich Korobov (born December 3, 1957, in Moscow) is a Russian businessman whose investments focus on the oil and gas sector. He is the controlling shareholder of SGO Sibgasoil Investments Limited, which has interests in Western Siberia.

Maxim Korobov served at various times as Chairman of the Board of Directors of Swiss company Rosco S.A.; Vice President of Eastern Oil Company (EOC) and head of EOC Trading House; President of Tomsk Oil and Gas Company; and head of the oil and gas team at Rossiisky Kredit bank. He was appointed to the Board of Directors of Petroneft Resources plc on 25 April 2016 and elected to the Board of Directors of Petrosibir AB on 29 June 2018.

Korobov graduated with honours from both the Military Institute of the Defence Ministry and the Russian Presidential Academy of State Service. He was also a researcher at the Institute of Oriental Studies of the Russian Academy of Sciences and taught at the Military Institute. He holds a PhD in political science.

Maxim Korobov was elected to the Tomsk Oblast regional parliament in 1997, and served as a member of the State Duma (Russian parliament) from 1999 to 2011, as a member of the United Russia party. As a member of the Duma's Committee on Power, Transport and Communications, he authored a bill proposing to end the practice of domestic roaming, whereby Russian mobile network operators charge higher prices to users travelling outside their “home” regions.
