= Alexander Shvetsov =

Russian ice hockey player (born 1988)

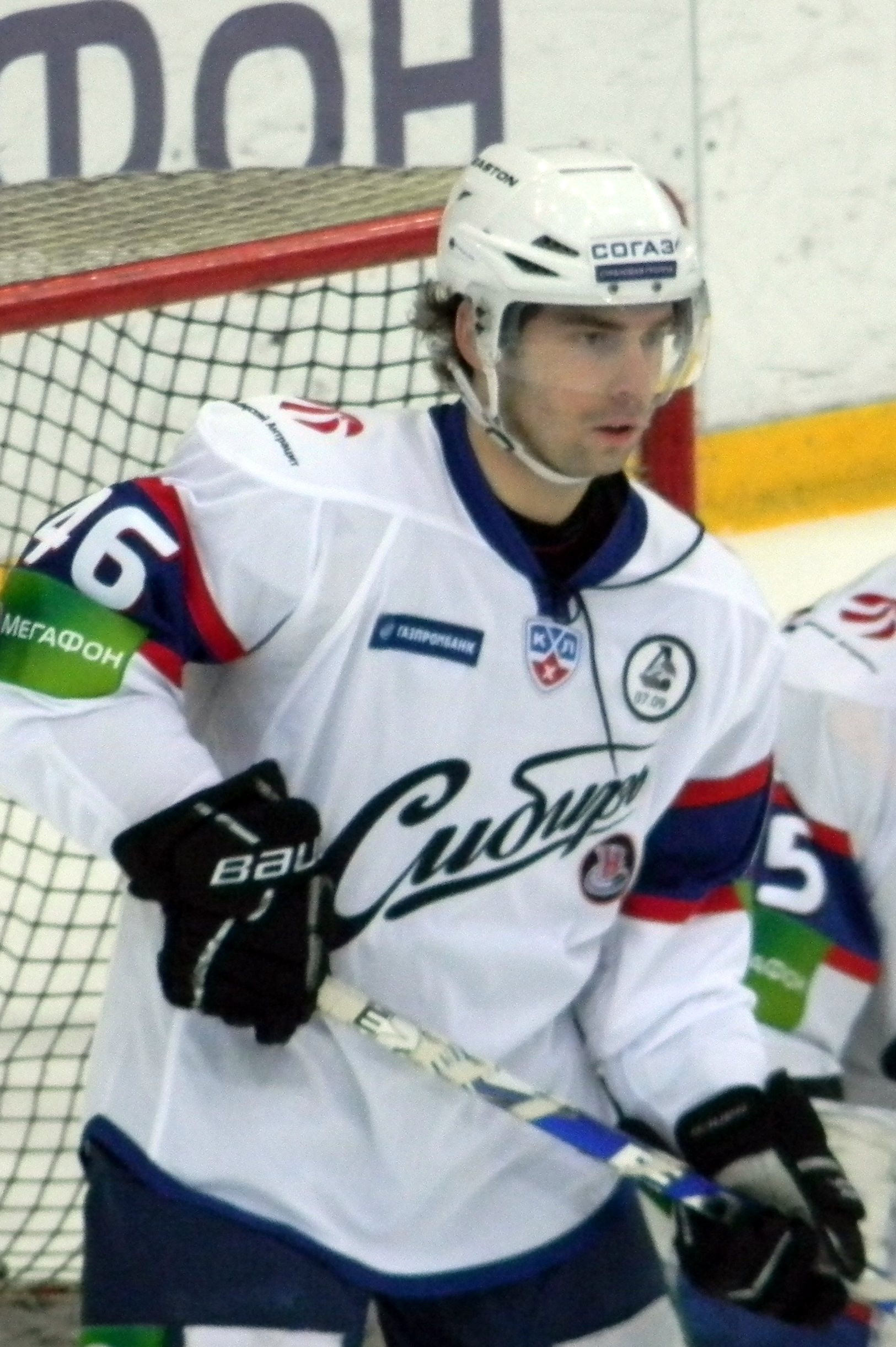
- Born: September 29, 1988 (age 37) Cherepovets, Russian SFSR
- Height: 5 ft 10 in (178 cm)
- Weight: 174 lb (79 kg; 12 st 6 lb)
- Position: Right wing
- Shoots: Left
- VHL team Former teams: Tsen Tou Jilin City; Metallurg Novokuznetsk; Spartak Moscow; Sibir Novosibirsk
- Playing career: 2007–present

Alexander Shvetsov (born September 29, 1988) is a Russian professional ice hockey forward who currently plays with Tsen Tou Jilin City in the Supreme Hockey League (VHL).

Shvetsov previously played in the Kontinental Hockey League for Metallurg Novokuznetsk, Spartak Moscow and Sibir Novosibirsk.
