= Ishim constituency =

Russian legislative constituency

Ishim single-member constituency
- Constituency of the Russian State Duma

- Constituency boundaries from 1993 to 2007
- Deputy: None
- Federal subject: Tyumen Oblast
- Districts: Abatsky, Armizonsky, Aromashevsky, Berdyuzhsky, Golyshmanovsky, Ishim, Ishimsky, Kazansky, Omutinsky, Sladkovsky, Sorokinsky, Tobolsk, Tobolsky, Uporovsky, Uvatsky, Vagaysky, Vikulovsky, Yalutorovsk, Yalutorovsky, Yarkovsky, Yurginsky, Zavodoukovsky
- Voters: 448,701 (2003)

The Ishim constituency (No.178) was a Russian legislative constituency in Tyumen Oblast in 1993–2007. It covered most of Tyumen Oblast encompassing vast territories east of Tyumen. The seat was last occupied by United Russia faction member Yury Konev (elected as People's Party candidate), a former Deputy Governor of Tyumen Oblast, who won the open-seat race in the 1999 election. In March 2007 Konev resigned from the State Duma after winning an election to the Tyumen Oblast Duma.

The constituency was dissolved in 2007 when State Duma adopted full proportional representation for the next two electoral cycles. Ishim constituency was not re-established for the 2016 election, currently territory of the former Ishim constituency is split between Tyumen constituency (northern part) and Zavodoukovsk constituency (southern part).

== Boundaries ==
1993–2007: Abatsky District, Armizonsky District, Aromashevsky District, Berdyuzhsky District, Golyshmanovsky District, Ishimsky District, Ishim, Kazansky District, Omutinsky District, Sladkovsky District, Sorokinsky District, Tobolsk, Tobolsky District, Uporovsky District, Uvatsky District, Vagaysky District, Vikulovsky District, Yalutorovsk, Yalutorovsky District, Yarkovsky District, Yurginsky District, Zavodoukovsk, Zavodoukovsky District
The constituency covered almost all of Tyumen Oblast, except the western part of the region where administrative centre Tyumen was located. It included the towns of Ishim, Tobolsk, Yalutorovsk and Zavodoukovsk.

== Members elected ==
Election	Member	Party
1993	Stanislav Shkuro	Independent
1995	Viktor Rozhkov (Note: appointed Head of the Tula Oblast Administration of the Ministry of Internal Affairs in September 1998)	Independent
1999	Yury Konev (Note: elected to the Tyumen Oblast Duma in March 2007)	Independent
2003	Yury Konev	People's Party

== Election results ==
=== 1993 ===
==== Declared candidates ====
- Yury Bubnov (YaBL), former Deputy Chairman of the Yarkovsky District Council of People's Deputies (1990–1993), journalist
- Karl Ruppel (Independent), former People's Deputy of Russia (1990–1993)
- Stanislav Shkuro (Independent), state experimental farm director

==== Results ====
Summary of the 12 December 1993 Russian legislative election in the Ishim constituency
Candidate	Party	Votes	%
Stanislav Shkuro	Independent	121,211	49.55%
Karl Ruppel	Independent	-	19.20%
Yury Bubnov	Yavlinsky–Boldyrev–Lukin	–	–
Total		244,642	100%

=== 1995 ===
==== Declared candidates ====
- Tamara Aksenova (Forward, Russia!), aide to State Duma member
- Safiulla Ilyasov (SMR), Siberian Tatar culture centre director
- Valery Kretov (VOPDT), transportation executive
- Vladilen Nikitin (Independent), former People's Deputy of the Soviet Union (1989–1991), former First Deputy Premier of the Soviet Union (1989–1990)
- Viktor Rozhkov (Independent), First Deputy Head of the MVD Ural Economic Region Division for Organized Crime (1993–present)
- Nikolay Tropin (Stable Russia), Member of State Duma (1994–present)
- Mirabo Uteshev (K–TR–zSS), Tyumen Industrial Institute professor of machinery
- Aleksey Vasilishin (LDPR), Member of State Duma (1994–present)
- Sergey Vasilyev (Independent)
- Gennady Yartsev (PRES)
- Lyudmila Zhelnina (Power to the People), Member of Tobolsk City Duma (1994–present)

==== Declined ====
- Stanislav Shkuro (BIR), incumbent Member of State Duma (1994–present)

==== Results ====
Summary of the 17 December 1995 Russian legislative election in the Ishim constituency
Candidate	Party	Votes	%
Viktor Rozhkov	Independent	63,809	21.61%
Mirabo Uteshev	Communists and Working Russia - for the Soviet Union	49,362	16.71%
Lyudmila Zhelnina	Power to the People	40,478	13.71%
Valery Kretov	Political Movement of Transport Workers	35,583	12.05%
Sergey Vasilyev	Independent	16,179	5.48%
Tamara Aksenova	Forward, Russia!	15,620	5.29%
Vladilen Nikitin	Independent	14,466	4.90%
Aleksey Vasilishin	Liberal Democratic Party	14,408	4.88%
Safiulla Ilyasov	Union of Muslims of Russia	7,870	2.66%
Gennady Yartsev	Party of Russian Unity and Accord	3,199	1.08%
Nikolay Tropin	Stable Russia	3,022	1.02%
against all		23,897	8.09%
Total		295,340	100%

=== 1999 ===
==== Declared candidates ====
- Tamara Kazantseva (CPRF), Member of Tobolsk City Duma (1996–present), heat and power plant foreman
- Yury Konev (Independent), Member of Tyumen Oblast Duma (1997–present)
- Olga Shcherbakova (LDPR), attorney
- Boris Tarasov (Russian Cause), former People's Deputy of Russia (1990–1993)
- Anatoly Ushakov (KTR–zSS), aide to Tyumen Oblast Duma member
- Viktor Vitkalov (Independent), oil executive
- Sergey Zimnev (Independent), businessman

==== Failed to qualify ====
- Yury Aksenov (Nikolayev–Fyodorov Bloc), businessman
- Vladimir Sharpatov (Independent), Il-76 aircraft captain, Hero of Russia (1996), 1995 Kandahar hijacking survivor
- Aleksandr Trushnikov (OVR), former Member of State Duma (1994–1995)

==== Results ====
Summary of the 19 December 1999 Russian legislative election in the Ishim constituency
Candidate	Party	Votes	%
Yury Konev	Independent	79,965	27.46%
Anatoly Ushakov	Communists and Workers of Russia - for the Soviet Union	60,253	20.69%
Tamara Kazantseva	Communist Party	43,972	15.10%
Viktor Vitkalov	Independent	40,534	13.92%
Olga Shcherbakova	Liberal Democratic Party	17,703	6.08%
Sergey Zimnev	Independent	13,201	4.53%
Boris Tarasov	Russian Cause	5,975	2.05%
against all		24,449	8.40%
Total		291,191	100%

=== 2003 ===
==== Declared candidates ====
- Eduard Altvater (ROPP), transportation businessman
- Vladimir Chertishchev (CPRF), Member of State Duma (2000–present), 1996 and 2001 gubernatorial candidate
- Andrey Koldobanov (LDPR), unemployed
- Yury Konev (NPRF), incumbent Member of State Duma (2000–present)

==== Withdrawn candidates ====
- Sergey Cherepkov (Independent), oil service businessman

==== Failed to qualify ====
- Vladimir Gabrus (APR), former People's Deputy of Russia (1990–1993)
- Aleksandr Maltsev (SPS), agriculture businessman

==== Results ====
Summary of the 7 December 2003 Russian legislative election in the Ishim constituency
Candidate	Party	Votes	%
Yury Konev (incumbent)	People's Party	175,074	62.12%
Vladimir Chertishchev	Communist Party	39,341	13.96%
Andrey Koldobanov	Liberal Democratic Party	17,602	6.25%
Eduard Altvater	Russian United Industrial Party	7,820	2.77%
against all		36,161	12.83%
Total		281,987	100%
