= Zavodoukovsk constituency =

Russian legislative constituency

Zavodoukovsk single-member constituency
- Constituency of the Russian State Duma

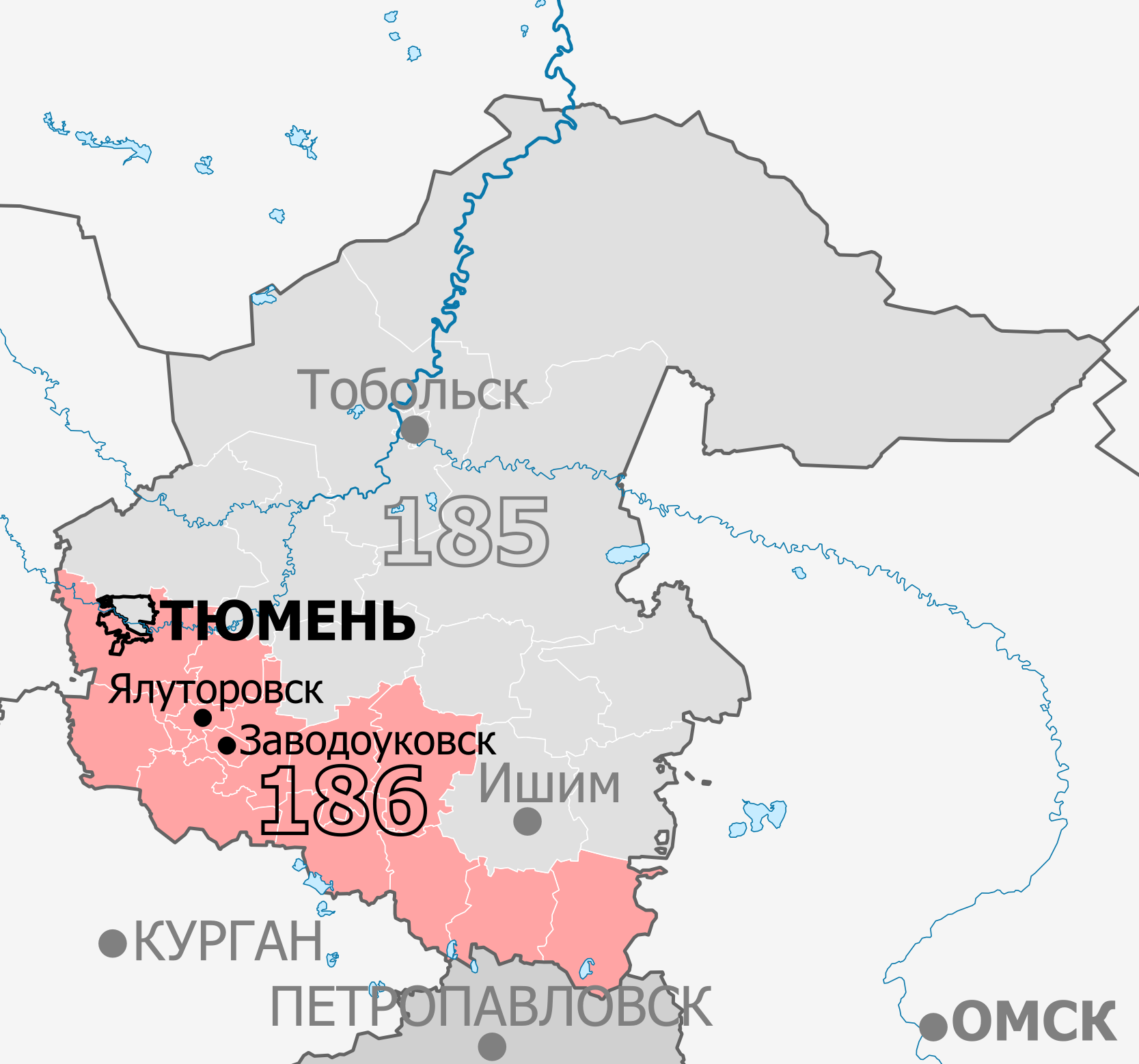
- Constituency boundaries since 2016
- Deputy: Ivan Kvitka; United Russia
- Federal subject: Tyumen Oblast
- Districts: Armizonsky, Berdyuzhsky, Golyshmanovsky, Isetsky, Kazansky, Omutinsky, Sladkovsky, Tyumen (Kalininsky, Vostochny), Tyumensky, Uporovsky, Yalutorovsk, Yalutorovsky, Zavodoukovsky
- Voters: 632,066 (2026)

The Zavodoukovsk constituency (No.184 (Note: No.186 in 2016–2026)) is a Russian legislative constituency in Tyumen Oblast. The constituency covers southern half of Tyumen and rural strip alongside southern border of the Tyumen Oblast, including the towns Zavodoukovsk and Yalutorovsk.

The constituency has been represented since 2016 by United Russia deputy Ivan Kvitka, five-term State Duma member and party official.

== Boundaries ==
2016–present: Armizonsky District, Berdyuzhsky District, Golyshmanovsky District, Isetsky District, Kazansky District, Omutinsky District, Sladkovsky District, Tyumen (Kalininsky, Vostochny), Tyumensky District, Uporovsky District, Yalutorovsk, Yalutorovsky District, Zavodoukovsk
The constituency was created for the 2016 election, taking southern half of Tyumen, Tyumensky and Isetsky districts from the former Tyumen constituency as well as southern Tyumen Oblast from the dissolved Ishim constituency.

== Members elected ==
| Election | Member | Party |
|---|---|---|
| 2016 | Ivan Kvitka | United Russia |
| 2021 | Ivan Kvitka | United Russia |
| 2026 | Ivan Kvitka | United Russia |

== Election results ==
=== 2016 ===
Summary of the 18 September 2016 Russian legislative election in the Zavodoukovsk constituency
| Candidate | Party | Votes | % |
|---|---|---|---|
| Ivan Kvitka | United Russia | 243,402 | 55.10% |
| Vladimir Sharpatov | A Just Russia | 60,029 | 13.59% |
| Artyom Zaytsev | Liberal Democratic Party | 47,242 | 10.69% |
| Aleksandr Chepik | Communist Party | 32,050 | 7.26% |
| Natalia Nesterova | Communists of Russia | 19,702 | 4.46% |
| Dmitry Kirillov | Yabloko | 10,074 | 2.28% |
| Andrey Agarkov | The Greens | 9,875 | 2.24% |
| Aleksey Yergaliyev | Party of Growth | 7,931 | 1.80% |
| Aleksandr Kunilovsky | People's Freedom Party | 6,897 | 1.56% |
| Total | | 441,755 | 100% |

=== 2021 ===
Summary of the 17-19 September 2021 Russian legislative election in the Zavodoukovsk constituency
| Candidate | Party | Votes | % |
|---|---|---|---|
| Ivan Kvitka (incumbent) | United Russia | 168,190 | 47.42% |
| Ivan Levchenko | Communist Party | 42,747 | 12.05% |
| Artyom Zaytsev | Liberal Democratic Party | 37,963 | 10.70% |
| Vladimir Sharpatov | A Just Russia — For Truth | 31,291 | 8.82% |
| Pavel Doronin | New People | 27,524 | 7.76% |
| Rafael Bulatov | Communists of Russia | 21,803 | 6.15% |
| Vladimir Selivanov | Party of Pensioners | 14,237 | 4.01% |
| Total | | 354,676 | 100% |

=== 2026 ===
Summary of the 18-20 September 2026 Russian legislative election in the Zavodoukovsk constituency
| Candidate | Party | Votes | % |
|---|---|---|---|
| Ivan Kvitka (incumbent) | United Russia | 242,790 | 59.09% |
| Ivan Levchenko | Communist Party | 51,424 | 12.52% |
| Artyom Zaytsev | New People | 41,590 | 10.12% |
| Ruslan Sabirov | Liberal Democratic Party | 32,959 | 8.02% |
| Yevgeny Usoltsev | A Just Russia | 18,372 | 4.47% |
| Yevgenia Safiyeva | Communists of Russia | 10,621 | 2.59% |
| Andrey Kholkin | Party of Pensioners | 7,487 | 1.82% |
| Total | | 410,854 | 100% |
