= Vagay =

Vagay (Russian: Вагай) is the name of several rural localities in Tyumen Oblast, Russia:

- Vagay, Omutinsky District, Tyumen Oblast, a selo in Vagaysky Rural Okrug of Omutinsky District
- Vagay, Vagaysky District, Tyumen Oblast, a selo in Pervovagaysky Rural Okrug of Vagaysky District
