= Vikulovo =

Vikulovo (Russian: Викулово) is the name of several rural localities in Russia:

- Vikulovo, Ryazan Oblast, a village in Myagkovsky Rural Okrug of Klepikovsky District of Ryazan Oblast
- Vikulovo, Tyumen Oblast, a selo in Vikulovsky Rural Okrug of Vikulovsky District of Tyumen Oblast
