= Armizonsky =

Armizonsky (masculine), Armizonskaya (feminine), or Armizonskoye (neuter) may refer to:

- Armizonsky District, a district of Tyumen Oblast
- Armizonskoye, a rural locality (a selo) in Armizonsky District of Tyumen Oblast, Russia
