= Anisimovka =

Anisimovka (Russian: Анисимовка) is the name of several rural localities in Russia:

- Anisimovka, Novosibirsk Oblast, a selo in Karasuksky District of Novosibirsk Oblast
- Anisimovka, Primorsky Krai, a selo in Shkotovsky District of Primorsky Krai
- Anisimovka, Rostov Oblast, a khutor in Verkhnemakeyevskoye Rural Settlement of Kasharsky District of Rostov Oblast
- Anisimovka, Tyumen Oblast, a village in Pamyatninsky Rural Okrug of Yalutorovsky District of Tyumen Oblast
- Anisimovka, Vologda Oblast, a village in Ilyinsky Selsoviet of Cherepovetsky District of Vologda Oblast
