= Vagina, Tyumen Oblast =

Vagina Вагина
- Derevnya
- Interactive map of Vagina
- Location of Vagina Vagina (Tyumen Oblast)
- Coordinates: 56°44′16″N 68°36′32″E
- Country: Russia
- Federal subject: Tyumen Oblast
- Administrative district: Aromashevsky District
- Rural SettlementSelsoviet: Yurminskoe Rural Settlement

Area
  - Total: 0.703 km^{2} (0.271 sq mi)

Population (2010 Census)
  - Total: 183
  - Estimate (2020): 179 (−2.2%)
  - Density: 260/km^{2} (674/sq mi)
- Time zone: UTC+5 (MSK+2)
- Postal code: 627360
- OKTMO ID: 71607455106

Vagina (Russian: Вагина) is a rural locality (a derevnya) in Yurminskoe Rural Settlement, Aromashevsky District, Tyumen Oblast, Russia.

== Geography ==
Vagina is located 1 km south of the Suetyak River's left bank. The village has an oxbow lake on the eastern side and a forest on the western side. In the Aromashevsky District, Vagina has the highest percentage of forested land, covering 67% of the village area.

== History ==
Vagina was first known in 1904. In that year, the village had a water mill and a population of 260. The village's name is derived from its founder, Vagin. The village council, Vaginsky Rural Council, existed from December 1919 to October 1923.

A gas pipeline from Vagina to Aromashevo was constructed in 1995. In 2024, one of Vagina's streets, Nosova Street, was paved.

== Demographics ==
Historical population
Year	Pop.	±%
1989	230	—
2002	226	−1.7%
2010	183	−19.0%
Source: Census data

In 2020, Vagina had an estimated population of 179 people. According to the 2010 Russian census, the village's population was 183, comprising 85 men and 98 women. In 2002, Russians made up the majority of the village population, accounting for 93%.

== Economy ==
Agriculture is one of the village's economic activities. About 11% of Vagina's land (8.10) is used for farming. The residents cultivate corn. In addition to agriculture, the villagers raised livestock, including cows and pigs. The village has a shop.

== Education ==
Vagina has a community center that includes library and a kindergarten. The village has no school, and students go to Yurminka.

== Healthcare ==
A feldsher–midwife station was inaugurated on 10 February 2021.

== Bibliography ==
- Solodovnikov, A.Yu (2024). ГЕОГРАФИЯ ТЮМЕНСКОЙ ОБЛАСТИ: АРОМАШЕВСКИЙ РАЙОН (PDF). Tyumen: Tyumen State University-Press. ISBN 978-5-400-01825-1.
