= Golyshmanovo =

Golyshmanovo (Russian: Голышманово) is the name of several inhabited localities in Golyshmanovsky District of Tyumen Oblast, Russia.

Urban localities

- Golyshmanovo (urban locality), a work settlement in Golyshmanovo Rural Okrug

Rural localities

- Golyshmanovo (rural locality), a selo in Golyshmanovsky Rural Okrug
