= Omutinsky =

Omutinsky (masculine), Omutinksaya (feminine), or Omutinskoye (neuter) may refer to:

- Omutinsky District, a district of Tyumen Oblast, Russia
- Omutinskaya, a rural locality (a village) in Arkhangelsk Oblast, Russia
- Omutinskoye, a rural locality (a selo) in Tyumen Oblast, Russia
