= Yalutorovsky =

Yalutorovsky (masculine), Yalutorovskaya (feminine), or Yalutorovskoye (neuter) may refer to:

- Yalutorovsky District, a district of Tyumen Oblast, Russia
- Yalutorovsky, former name of the town of Yalutorovsk, Tyumen Oblast, Russia
