= Zavodoukovsky =

Zavodoukovsky (masculine), Zavodoukovskaya (feminine), or Zavodoukovskoye (neuter) may refer to:

- Zavodoukovsky District, a district of Tyumen Oblast, Russia
- Zavodoukovsky Urban Okrug, a municipal formation in Tyumen Oblast
