= Alexander Zhuravlyov =

Russian Ground Forces officer (born 1965)

Colonel General Alexander Zhuravlyov Александр Журавлёв
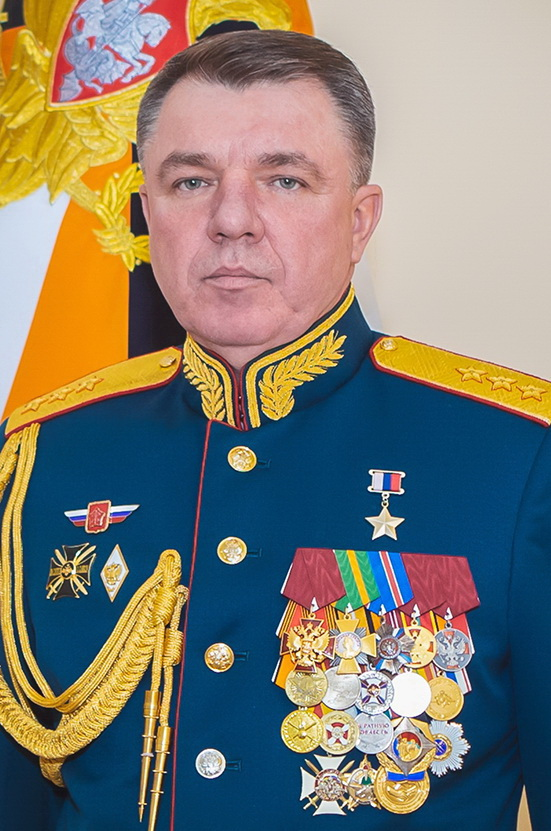
- Born: 5 December 1965 (age 60); Golyshmanovo, Tyumen Oblast, Russian SFSR, Soviet Union
- Military career
- Allegiance: Soviet Union; 1982–1991; Russia; 1991–present
- Branch: Soviet Army; Russian Ground Forces
- Service years: 1982–present
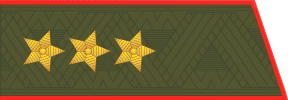
- Rank: Colonel General
- Commands: Group of Forces in Syria; Eastern Military District; Western Military District
- Conflicts: Syrian Civil War; Russo-Ukrainian War; Russian invasion of Ukraine
- Awards: Hero of the Russian Federation; Order of Merit for the Fatherland, IV degree Order of Suvorov; Order of Military Merit

Colonel General Alexander Alexandrovich Zhuravlyov (Russian: Александр Александрович Журавлёв; born 5 December 1965) is a Russian Ground Forces officer who has commanded the military force in Syria during the Russian military intervention in the Syrian Civil War and served as the commander of the Western Military District from November 2018 to June 2022. After returning from Syria, he became the Deputy Chief of the General Staff before being appointed commander of the Eastern Military District in November 2017. He was also awarded the title Hero of the Russian Federation in 2016 by a directive of the President.

== Biography ==
=== Early career (2008–2021) ===
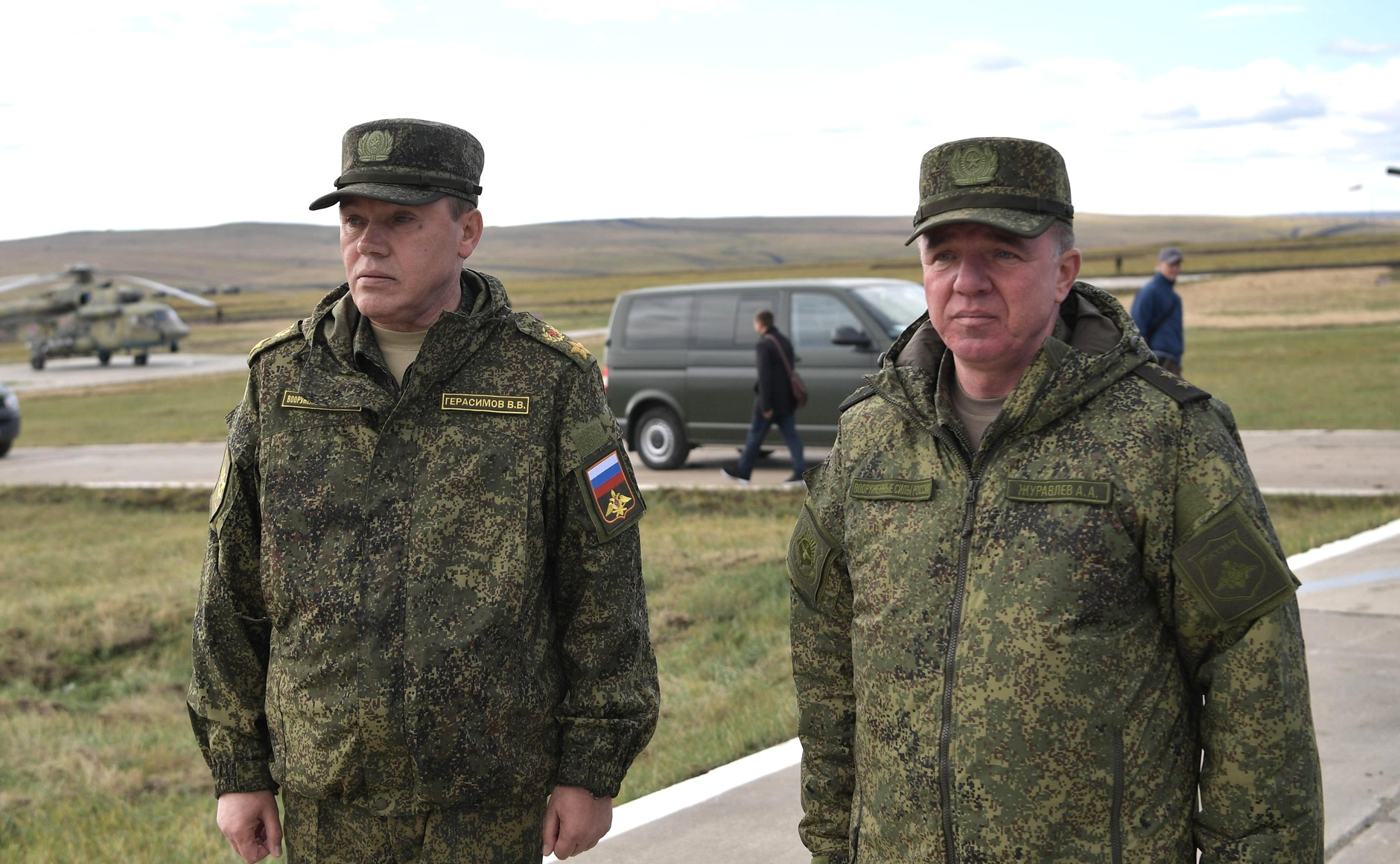
Chief of the General Staff Valery Gerasimov with Eastern Military District Commander Zhuravlyov at the Vostok 2018 military exercise

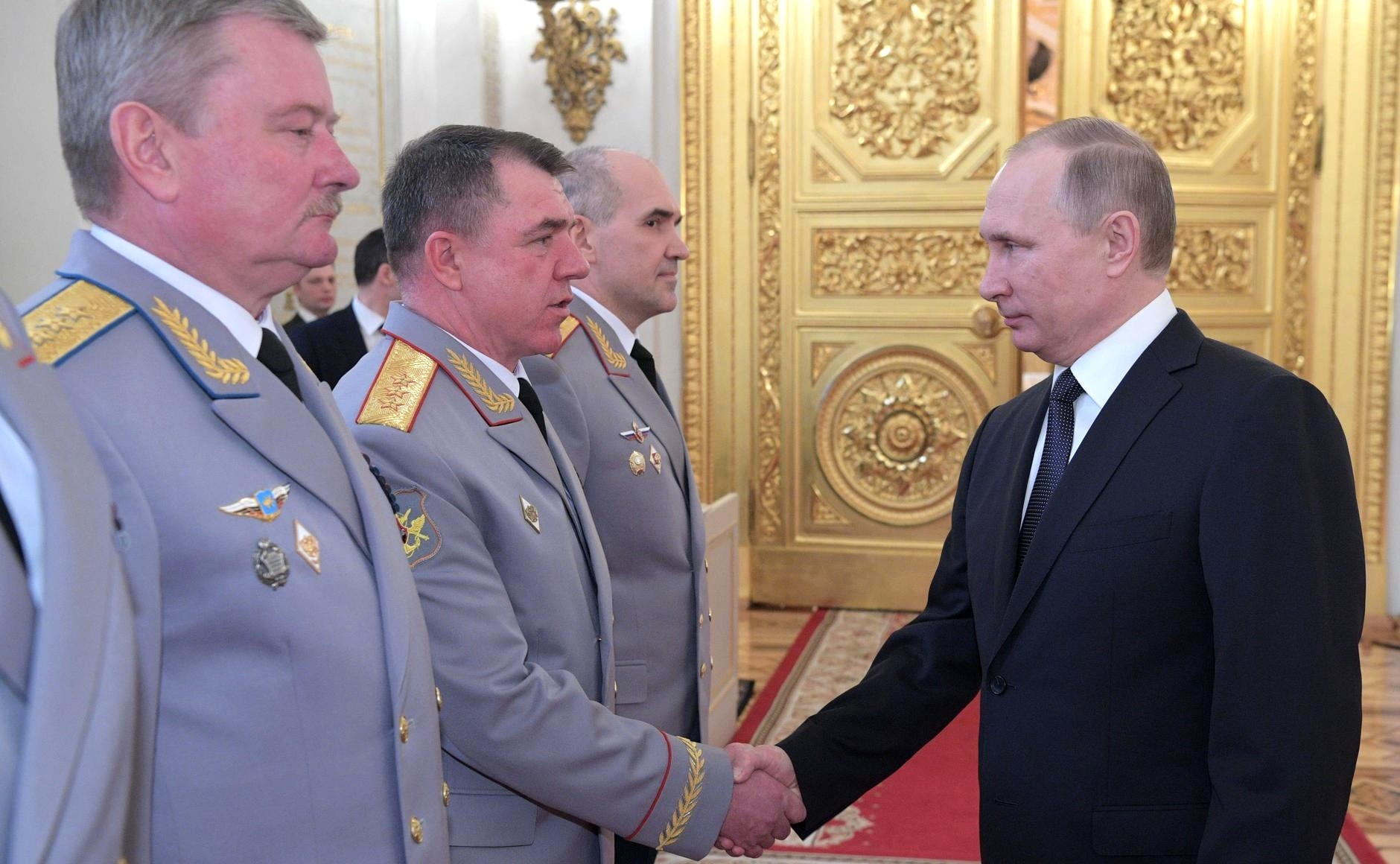
President Putin shaking hands with Zhuravlyov

He was born in the town of Golyshmanovo, in the Tyumen Oblast, in 1965. In 1982, Zhuralvyov finished secondary school and joined the Soviet Army. He graduated from the Chelyabinsk Higher Tank Command School in 1986 and the Malinovsky Military Armored Forces Academy in 1996. Finally, in 2008 Zhuravlyov graduated from the General Staff Academy. During his service, he was stationed in Czechoslovakia (1986–1991), the Volga (1991–1994), Far Eastern (1994–2006), North Caucasus (2008–2008), Central (2010–2015), and Southern Military Districts (2015). He has served as the chief of staff of the 58th Army and as commander of the 2nd Guards Combined Arms Army before being transferred to the Southern Military District in 2015, having previously been promoted to lieutenant general in 2014.

==== Syria (2016) ====
In July 2016, Lieutenant General Alexander Zhuravlyov was appointed as the commander of the Russian military forces in Syria, replacing Colonel General Aleksandr Dvornikov. He held this post until December 2016, when he was replaced by Colonel General Andrey Kartapolov. For his service in Syria he was given the title of Hero of Russia.

==== Deputy Chief of General Staff (2017) ====
Since leaving Syria, Zhuravlyov was promoted to colonel general and appointed Deputy Chief of General Staff. In February 2017, he met with the Vice Chief of Defense Staff of the United Kingdom, General Sir Gordon Messenger to discuss renewed military cooperation in order to prevent any incidents.

==== Commander of Eastern Military District (2017) ====
On 22 November 2017, Zhuravlyov was appointed commander of the Eastern Military District, replacing Colonel General Sergey Surovikin, who transferred to command the Russian Aerospace Forces.

==== Syria again (2018) ====
In January 2018, he once again took command of the contingent of Russian military forces stationed in Syria, having taken over from General Sergey Surovikin.

==== Commander of the Western Military District (2018) ====
In November 2018, he was appointed commander of the Western Military District.

=== 2022 Russian invasion of Ukraine ===
As commander of the Western Military District, Zhuravlyov was responsible for the Russian troops that invaded northern Ukraine during the 2022 Russian invasion of Ukraine, before Aleksandr Dvornikov was appointed overall commander on 9 April 2022. On 13 May, CNN reported that newly collected evidence identified Zhuravlyov ordering the use of 17 cluster bombs, cluster munition fired from the 300mm Smerch multiple rocket launcher, by the 79th Rocket Artillery Brigade against civilian targets in Kharkiv on 27–28 February. Human Rights Watch investigated the attack and concluded that the Russian forces used BM-30 Smerch cluster munition rockets, which disperse dozens of submunitions or bomblets in the air. As there were no military targets within 400 meters of these strikes and due to the indiscriminate nature of these weapons used in densely populated areas, HRW described these strikes as a possible war crime.

He was dismissed as commander of the Western Military District in June 2022.

=== Sanctions ===
As a result of Zhuravlyov's involvement in Ukraine, the Government of New Zealand enacted travel ban sanctions on him personally.

He was sanctioned by the UK government on 15 March 2022 in relation to the Russo-Ukrainian War.

== See also ==
- List of Heroes of the Russian Federation

Military offices
Preceded by Aleksandr Dvornikov	Commander of the Group of Forces in Syria; 2016	Succeeded by Andrei Kartapolov
Preceded by Sergey Surovikin	Commander of the Eastern Military District; 2017–2018	Succeeded by Gennady Zhidko
Preceded by Sergei Surovikin	Commander of the Group of Forces in Syria; 2018	Succeeded by Sergey Kuralenko
Preceded by Viktor Astapov	Commander of the Western Military District; 2018–2022	Succeeded by Andrei Sychevoi
