= Vagaysky =

Vagaysky (masculine), Vagayskaya (feminine), or Vagayskoye (neuter) may refer to:

- Vagaysky District, a district of Tyumen Oblast
- Vagayskaya, a rural locality (a village) in Tyumen Oblast, Russia
