= Sorokinsky =

Sorokinsky (masculine), Sorokinskaya (feminine), or Sorokinskoye (neuter) may refer to:

- Sorokinsky District, a district of Tyumen Oblast
- Sorokinsky (rural locality), a rural locality (a settlement) in Arkhangelsk Oblast, Russia
- Sorokinskaya, a rural locality (a village) in Arkhangelsk Oblast, Russia
