= Vikulovsky =

Vikulovsky (masculine), Vikulovskaya (feminine), or Vikulovskoye (neuter) may refer to:

- Vikulovsky District, a district of Tyumen Oblast, Russia
- Vikulovskoye, a rural locality (a village) in Nizhny Novgorod Oblast, Russia
