= Red Hungarians =

Red Hungarian soldiers in Siberia

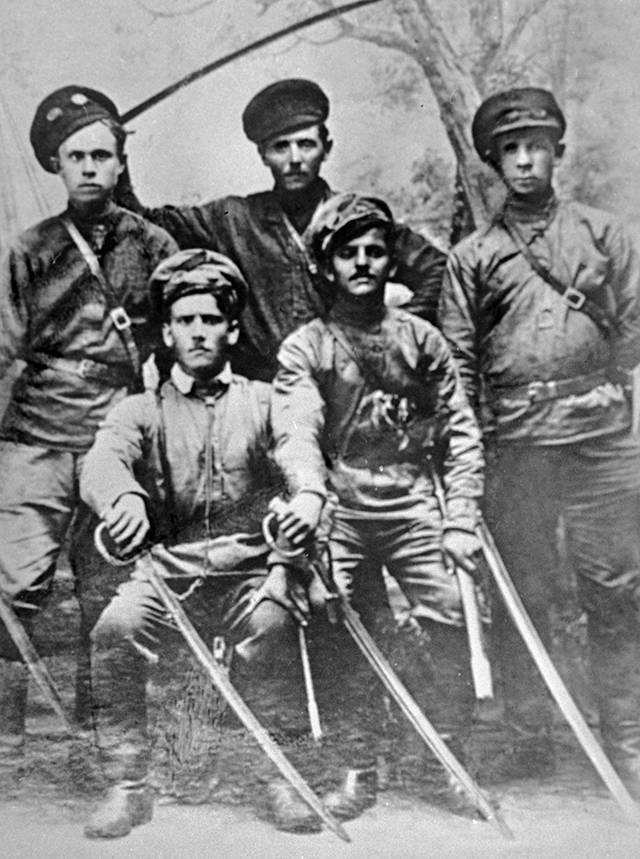
- The Red Hungarians (Hungarian: Vörös Magyarok), numbering between 80,000 and 100,000, played an important role in the Russian Civil War.
- Engagements: Battle of Kazan; Both battles for Omsk; Defending the Turkestan and Mongolian borders

Red Hungarians were Hungarians who became prisoners in Russia following World War I. After the Russian Civil War broke out, they joined the Bolsheviks. The Hungarians made up on average around 70% of the International Army; this percentage was higher in eastern cities. Before they were enlisted many, Hungarian prisoners worked in Russian factories, around 20-25% of the industrial workforce consisted of Hungarians. They were not forcefully enlisted. They joined willingly because they were mostly from peasant background, and were treated better by the Bolsheviks than the Tsarists. The Tsarists oppressed the Hungarian and German prisoners, instead appealing to the Slavic prisoners. When the Bolsheviks took control of Saint Petersburg, they gave the prisoners (the majority of whom were Hungarian) many rights, such as the ability to walk the city streets without supervision and the chance to serve in the Bolshevik Army.

They were known for being extremely cruel in their attacks, executing those they captured and ruthlessly suppressing uprisings; Czechoslovak military commander Radola Gajda noted that Russian Red Guardsmen were feeble opponents and when pressed hard would make a run for it, but the Magyars always held their ground.

A notable Hungarian Red Guard was stationed in the House of Ipatiev, where Tsar Nicholas II was executed, with one of the shooters being confirmed a Red Hungarian (András Verhás).

== Clashes with the Czechoslovak legions ==
A main reason Red Hungarians were so popular among the Soviet Army was because of their effectiveness and their willingness to fight the Czechoslovak Legion that had been constantly attacking Russian railways. The Red Hungarians reconquered a large number of railways, which led to the Bolsheviks reconquering the Trans-Siberian Railway and also defeating the Czechoslovak Legion. 1

== Important roles within the civil war ==
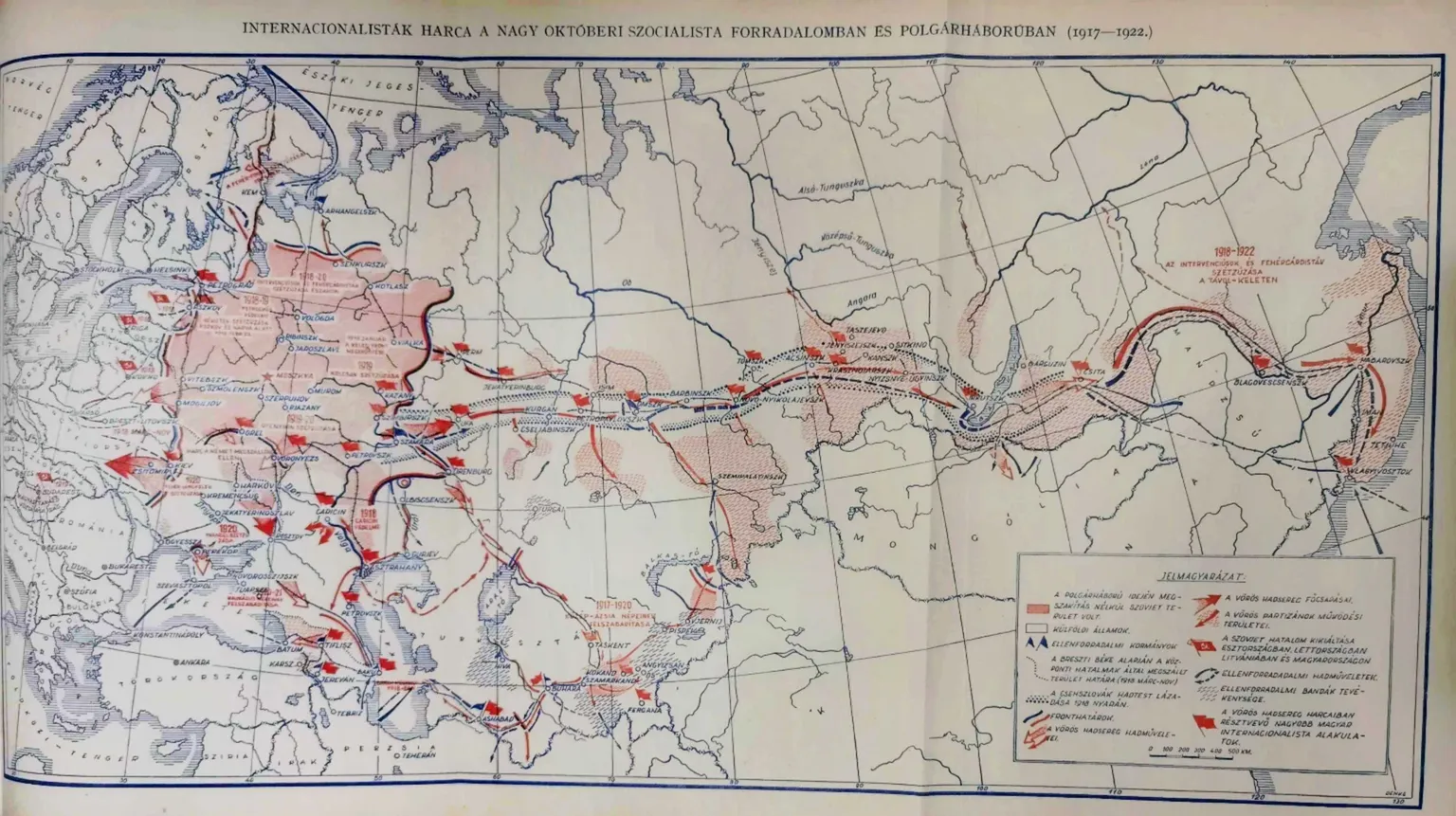
Map of the Russian civil war including areas and cities where Hungarian Internationalists were the majority of the soldiers.

Alongside fighting the Czechoslovak Legion, Red Hungarians were important in the defense of the Mongolian borders and defending and attacking the Volga, Urals, Siberia, Ukraine, Uzbekistan and Turkestan. For instance: Ishim's red guard was composed completely of red Hungarians; Turkestan's front was composed mostly of Internationalist soldiers from Tashkent, around 7500, majority were Magyar.

Important cities Red Hungarians guarded, captured

- Omsk
- Tomsk
- Tyumen
- Krasnoyarsk
- Vladivostok
- Tashkent
- Petrograd
- Riga
- Irkutsk
- Chita
- Khabarovsk
- Ishim
- Serpukhov
- Poltava
- Ekaterinoslav
- Kostroma
- Tver
- Shkotovo
- Sretensk
- Samarkand
- Orenburg
- Ivanovo-Voznesensk
- Kazan
- Yaroslavl
- Kursk
- Samara
- Lyubim
- Oryol
- Simbirsk
- Tambov
- Penza
- Voronezh
- Nizhny Tagil
- Orenburg
- Perm
