= Ivan Kvitka =

Russian politician

- Иван Квитка
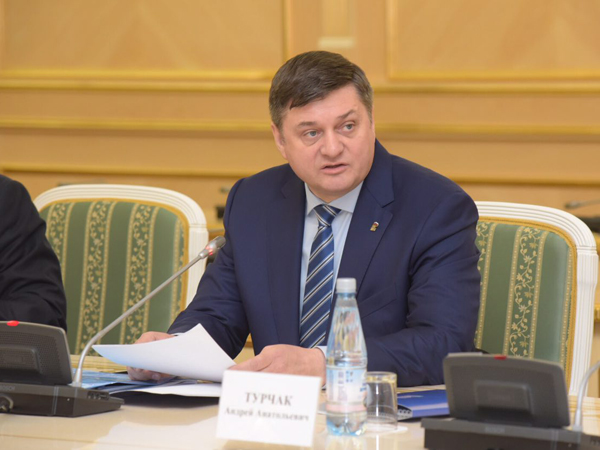

Member of the State Duma for Tyumen Oblast
- Incumbent
- Assumed office 5 October 2016
- Preceded by: constituency established
- Constituency: Zavodoukovsk (No. 186)

Member of the State Duma (Party List Seat)
- In office 24 December 2007 – 5 October 2016

Personal details
- Born: 4 May 1967 (age 59) Kalach, Sverdlovsk Oblast, Russian SFSR, Soviet Union
- Party: United Russia
- Education: Industrial University of Tyumen; Tyumen State University; RANEPA
- Occupation: Academic

Ivan Ivanovich Kvitka (Russian: Иван Иванович Квитка; born May 4, 1967, Kalach, Sverdlovsk Oblast) is a Russian political figure and a deputy of the 8th State Duma.

In 2000, Kvitka was granted a Candidate of Sciences degree in Philosophy. From 1992 to 1997, he worked as Vice-Rector for General Affairs of the Tyumen State Institute of World Economics, Management and Law. In 2001-2007, he was the deputy of the Tyumen Regional Duma of the 3rd and 4th convocations. In 2007, he was elected deputy of the State Duma of the 5th convocation. In 2011, 2016, and 2021, he was re-elected for the 6th, 7th, and 8th State Dumas.

== Sanctions ==
He was sanctioned by the UK government in 2022 in relation to the Russo-Ukrainian War.

== Awards ==
- Order "For Merit to the Fatherland", 2nd Class (October 13, 2014) — for active legislative work and many years of dedicated service.
- Certificate of Honor of the Tyumen Regional Duma.
- Certificate of Honor of the President of the Russian Federation (June 12, 2013) — for a significant contribution to the development of Russian parliamentarism and active legislative work.
- Letter of Appreciation from the President of the Russian Federation (October 21, 2009) — for fruitful legislative and public activities.
- Commemorative Badge “IPA CIS. 30 Years” (November 16, 2023, Interparliamentary Assembly of the CIS) — for merits in the development and strengthening of parliamentarism, contribution to the development and improvement of the legal foundations of the Commonwealth of Independent States, and strengthening of international relations and interparliamentary cooperation.
