= Ksenia Goryacheva =

Russian politician (born 1996)

Ksenia Goryacheva MP
- Ксения Горячева
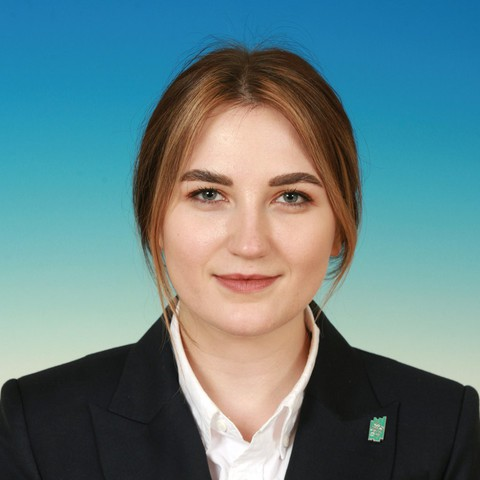

Member of the State Duma (Party List Seat)
- Incumbent
- Assumed office 12 October 2021

Personal details
- Born: 16 May 1996 (age 30) Aromashevo, Tyumen Oblast, Russia
- Party: New People
- Education: Plekhanov Russian University of Economics

Ksenia Alexandrovna Goryacheva (Russian: Ксения Александровна Горячева; born 16 May 1996, Aromashevo, Tyumen Oblast) is a Russian political figure and a deputy of the 8th State Duma.

After graduating from the Plekhanov Russian University of Economics, Goryacheva worked as a junior manager for regional development at the Charitable Foundation for Support of Educational Programs CAPITANY. In April 2021, she was appointed secretary of the Saint-Petersburg branch of the New People. Since September 2021, she has served as deputy of the 8th State Duma.

== Personal life ==
On April 25, 2025, she married Danil Makhnitsky, co-founder of the organization Society.Future.

== Sanctions ==
She was sanctioned by the UK government in 2022 in relation to the Russo-Ukrainian War. She also received sanctions from Canada, the United States, the European Union, Monaco, Switzerland, Australia and Japan.
