= Novoderevensky =

Novoderevensky (masculine), Novoderevenskaya (feminine), or Novoderevenskoye (neuter) may refer to:

- Novoderevensky District, name of Alexandro-Nevsky District of Ryazan Oblast, Russia, until June 2012
- Novoderevensky (rural locality), a rural locality (a settlement) in Talitsky District of Sverdlovsk Oblast, Russia
- Novoderevenskoye, a rural locality (a selo) under the administrative jurisdiction of the city of oblast significance of Yuzhno-Sakhalinsk in Sakhalin Oblast, Russia
- Novoderevenskaya, a rural locality (a village) in Okunevsky Rural Okrug of Omutinsky District of Tyumen Oblast, Russia
