= Aromashevsky District =

Aromashevsky District Аромашевский район (Russian)
- District
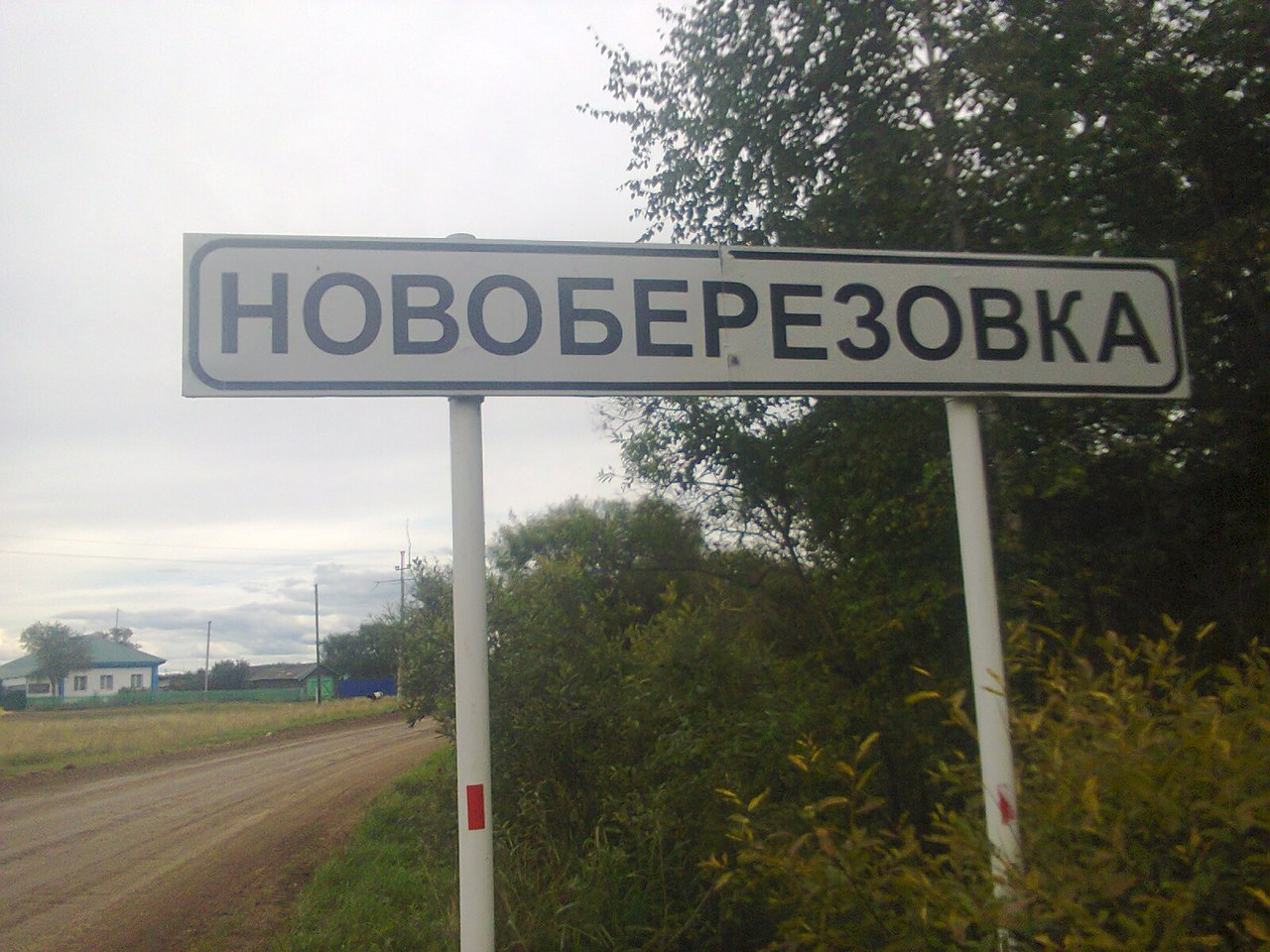
- Entrance to village Novoberezovka, Aromashevsky District

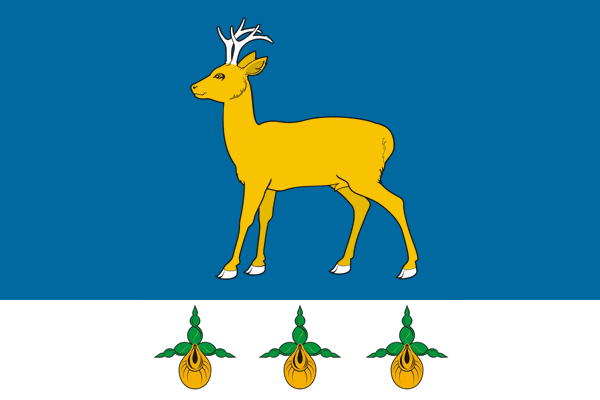
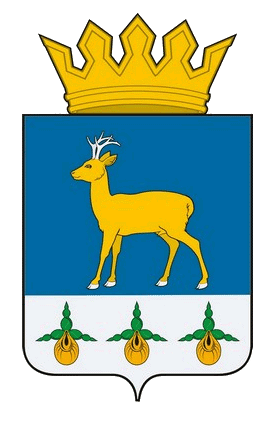
- Flag Coat of arms
- Location of Aromashevsky District in Tyumen Oblast
- Coordinates: 56°51′32″N 68°39′16″E
- Country: Russia
- Federal subject: Tyumen Oblast
- Established: 1923
- Administrative center: Aromashevo

Area
  - Total: 3,900 km^{2} (1,500 sq mi)

Population (2010 Census)
  - Total: 12,202
  - Density: 3.1/km^{2} (8.1/sq mi)
  - Urban: 0%
  - Rural: 100%

Administrative structure
  - Administrative divisions: 11 Rural okrugs
  - Inhabited localities: 38 rural localities

Municipal structure
  - Municipally incorporated as: Aromashevsky Municipal District
  - Municipal divisions: 0 urban settlements, 11 rural settlements
- Time zone: UTC+5 (MSK+2)
- OKTMO ID: 71607000
- Website: http://aromashevo.admtyumen.ru/

Aromashevsky District (Russian: Арома́шевский райо́н) is an administrative district (raion), one of the twenty-two in Tyumen Oblast, Russia. As a municipal division, it is incorporated as Aromashevsky Municipal District. It is located in the center of the oblast. The area of the district is 3,900 square kilometers (1,500 sq mi). Its administrative center is the rural locality (a selo) of Aromashevo. Population: 12,202 (2010 Census); 14,175 (2002 census); 16,960 (1989 Soviet census). The population of Aromashevo accounts for 44.0% of the district's total population.

== Geography ==
Aromashevsky District is located in the southeast of Tyumen Oblast, on very slightly hilly forest-steppe of the West Siberian Plain. The area is one of extensive wetlands - ponds, lakes, and marshes - due to the lack of water run-off from the flat terrain. 59% of the district is covered by forest, and there are a number of peat deposits and two licensed oil-and-gas tracts. About a quarter of the district is agricultural land, and 1% is water. The soil is highly fertile and supports grain and vegetables. The administrative center of Aromashevo is located in the middle-western sector of the area. Aromashevsky District is 170 km east of the city of Tyumen, 300 km northwest of the city of Omsk, and 1,850 km east of Moscow. The area measures 72 km (north-south), 76 km (west-east); total area is 3,900 km2 (about 0.003% of Tyumen Oblast).

The district is bordered on the north by Vagaysky District, on the east by Sorokinsky District, on the south by Golyshmanovsky District and Ishimsky District, and on the west by Yurginsky District.

== History ==
Aromashevsky District was officially formed in November 1923. In January 1934 it was moved to Chelyabinsk Region, and later in that year to Omsk Region. By decree in 1944 of the USSR Supreme Council, the district was moved to Tyumen Oblast. In 1963 the district was abolished and incorporated into Galyshmanovsky District, but restored in 1970.
