= Administrative divisions of Tyumen Oblast =

Tyumen Oblast Russia
- Administrative center: Tyumen

Administrative structure (as of 2012)
- Districts: 22
- Cities/towns: 5
- Urban-type settlements: 0
- Selsovets: 293

Municipal structure (as of 2002)
- Rural settlements: 1,331 (inhabited); 40 (uninhabited)

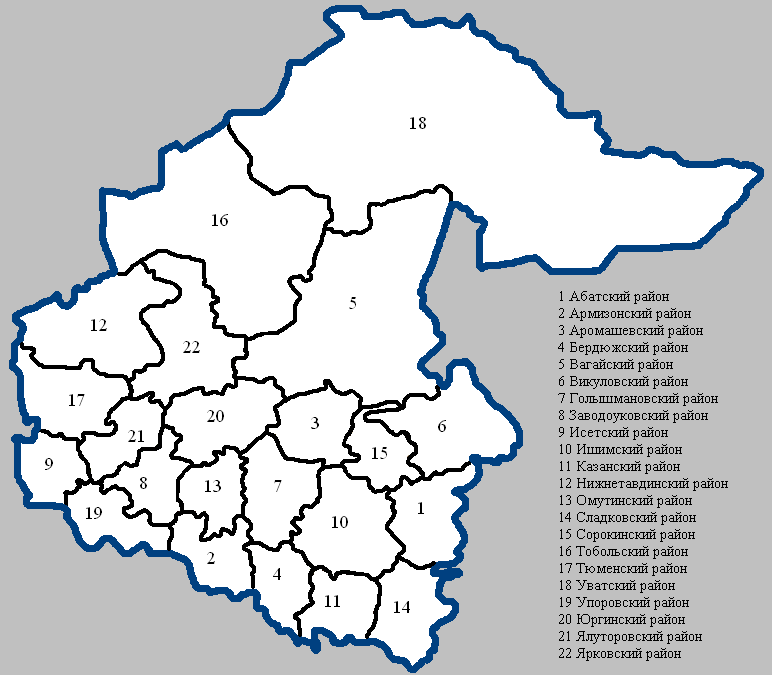
Map of Tyumen Oblast (with numbered)

Tyumen Oblast is a federal subject of Russia.

== Administrative and municipal divisions ==
Map

Division		Structure		OKATO	OKTMO	Rural (rural okrug)
Division		Administrative	Municipal	OKATO	OKTMO	Rural (rural okrug)
Tyumen (Тюмень)		city	urban okrug	71 401	71 701	
↳	Kalininsky (Калининский)	(under Tyumen)	—N/a	71 401	—N/a	
↳	Leninsky (Ленинский)	(under Tyumen)	—N/a	71 401	—N/a	
↳	Tsentralny (Центральный)	(under Tyumen)	—N/a	71 401	—N/a	
↳	Vostochny (Восточный)	(under Tyumen)	—N/a	71 401	—N/a	
Zavodoukovsk (Заводоуковск)		city	urban okrug	71 403	71 703	
Ishim (Ишим)		city	urban okrug	71 405	71 705	
Tobolsk (Тобольск)		city	urban okrug	71 410	71 710	
Yalutorovsk (Ялуторовск)		city	urban okrug	71 415	71 715	
Abatsky (Абатский)		district		71 203	71 603	11
Armizonsky (Армизонский)		district		71 205	71 605	9
Aromashevsky (Аромашевский)		district		71 207	71 607	11
Berdyuzhsky (Бердюжский)		district		71 210	71 610	9
Vagaysky (Вагайский)		district		71 213	71 613	19
Vikulovsky (Викуловский)		district		71 215	71 615	14
Golyshmanovsky (Голышмановский)		district	urban okrug	71 218	71 618	15
Zavodoukovsky (Заводоуковский)		district	(under Zavodoukovsk)	71 222	71 703	
Isetsky (Исетский)		district		71 224	71 624	16
Ishimsky (Ишимский)		district		71 226	71 626	22
Kazansky (Казанский)		district		71 230	71 630	14
Nizhnetavdinsky (Нижнетавдинский)		district		71 232	71 632	17
Omutinsky (Омутинский)		district		71 234	71 634	8
Sladkovsky (Сладковский)		district		71 236	71 636	10
Sorokinsky (Сорокинский)		district		71 238	71 638	7
Tobolsky (Тобольский)		district		71 242	71 642	22
Tyumensky (Тюменский)		district		71 244	71 644	24
Uvatsky (Уватский)		district		71 248	71 648	12
Uporovsky (Упоровский)		district		71 250	71 650	14
Yurginsky (Юргинский)		district		71 253	71 653	10
Yalutorovsky (Ялуторовский)		district		71 256	71 656	15
Yarkovsky (Ярковский)		district		71 258	71 658	14
Khanty-Mansi (Ха́нты-Манси́йский)		autonomous okrug		see list of divisions		
Yamalo-Nenets (Ямало-Ненецкий)		autonomous okrug		see list of divisions		
