= Armizonsky District =

Armizonsky District Армизонский район
- District
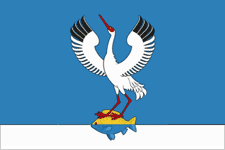
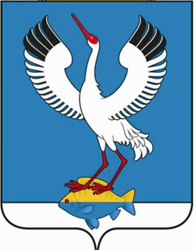
- Flag Coat of arms
- Location of Armizonsky District in Tyumen Oblast
- Coordinates: 55°56′36″N 67°41′29″E
- Country: Russia
- Federal subject: Tyumen Oblast
- Established: 1923
- Administrative center: Armizonskoye

Area
  - Total: 3,109 km^{2} (1,200 sq mi)

Population (2010 Census)
  - Total: 10,064
  - Density: 3.237/km^{2} (8.384/sq mi)
  - Urban: 0%
  - Rural: 100%

Administrative structure
  - Administrative divisions: 9 Rural okrugs
  - Inhabited localities: 34 rural localities

Municipal structure
  - Municipally incorporated as: Armizonsky Municipal District
  - Municipal divisions: 0 urban settlements, 9 rural settlements
- Time zone: UTC+5 (MSK+2)
- OKTMO ID: 71605000
- Website: http://armizon.admtyumen.ru/mo/Armizon/index.htm

Armizonsky District (Russian: Армизо́нский райо́н) is an administrative district (raion), one of the twenty-two in Tyumen Oblast, Russia. As a municipal division, it is incorporated as Armizonsky Municipal District. It is located in the south of the oblast. The area of the district is 3,109 square kilometers (1,200 sq mi). Its administrative center is the rural locality (a selo) of Armizonskoye. Population: 10,064 (2010 Census); 11,027 (2002 Census); 13,922 (1989 Soviet census). The population of Armizonskoye accounts for 47.5% of the district's total population.

== Geography ==
Armizonsky District is located in the southeast of Tyumen Oblast, on very slightly hilly plain of forest-steppe terrain of the West Siberian Plain. 59% of the area is agricultural land. The lack of runoff creates a high water table, and in some years flooding and strong ground saturation. The area has numerous lakes and wetlands, and some peatlands. The tops of the ridges and slopes are steppe-meadow with black soils. The district is between the drainages of the Tobol River (to the west) and the Ishim River (to the east). The administrative center of Aromashevo is located in the middle-western sector of the area. Armizonsky District is 170 km east of the city of Tyumen, 100 km northwest of the city of Petropavl, Kazakhstan, and 1,800 km east of Moscow. The area measures 72 km (north-south), 76 km (west-east); total area is 3,109 km2 (about 0.003% of Tyumen Oblast).

The district is bordered on the north by Omutinsky District and Golyshmanovsky District, on the east by Berdyuzhsky District, on the south by Mokrousovsky District of Kurgan Oblast, and on the west by Zavodoukovsky District and Uporovsky.

== History ==
Armizonsky District was officially formed in November 1923 as part of the Ishimsky district of the Ural Region. In 1934 the district was abolished and merged into Berdyuzhsky District, but restored in 1935 as part of Omsk Oblast. The district was transferred to Kurgan Oblast in 1943, and finally Tyumen Oblast in 1944. From 1963 to 1965, it was temporarily part of Berdyuzhsky Area.
