= Berdyuzhye =

Rural locality in Tyumen Oblast, Russia

Coordinates: 55°48′19″N 68°19′00″E

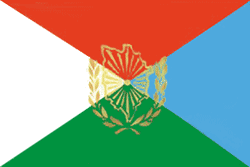
Flag of Berdyuzhye

Berdyuzhye (Russian: Бердюжье) is a rural locality (a selo) and the administrative center of Berdyuzhsky District, Tyumen Oblast, Russia. Population: 5,158 (2010 census); 5,256 (2002 census); 5,516 (1989 Soviet census).
