= Uporovo =

Rural locality in Tyumen Oblast, Russia

Coordinates: 56°18′50″N 66°16′01″E

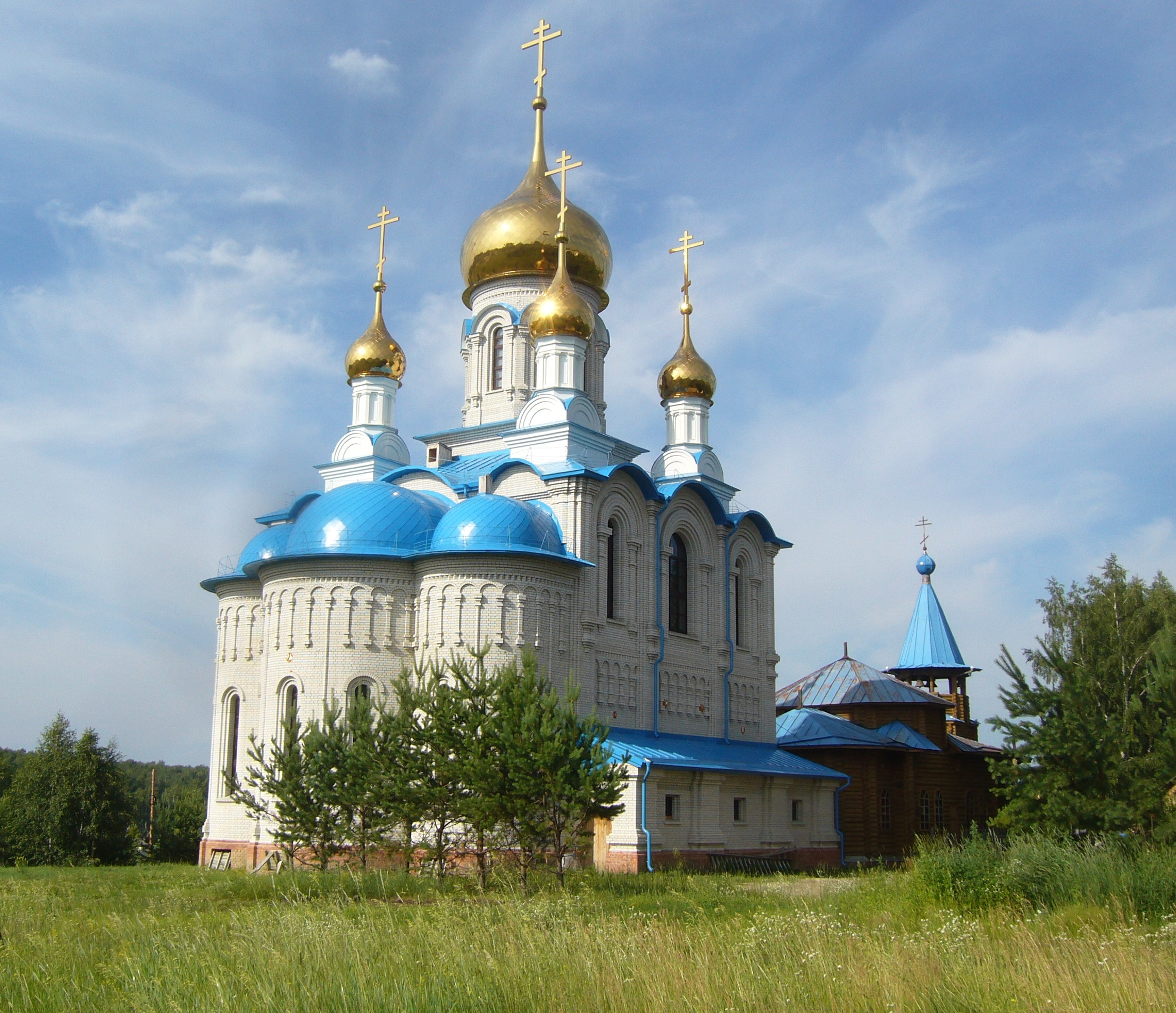

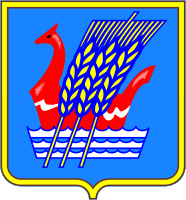
Coat of arms of Uporovo

Uporovo (Russian: Упорово) is a rural locality (a selo) and the administrative center of Uporovsky District, Tyumen Oblast, Russia. Population: 5,847 (2010 census); 5,333 (2002 census); 5,466 (1989 Soviet census).
