= Bolshoye Sorokino =

Rural locality in Tyumen Oblast, Russia

Coordinates: 56°37′56″N 69°48′35″E

Bolshoye Sorokino (Russian: Большое Сорокино) is a rural locality (a selo) and the administrative center of Sorokinsky District, Tyumen Oblast, Russia. Population: 5,317 (2010 census); 5,497 (2002 census); 6,167 (1989 Soviet census).
