= Anisimovka, Vologda Oblast =

Anisimovka Анисимовка
- Village
- Location within Vologda Oblast Location within Russia
- Coordinates: 58°43′N 38°28′E
- Country: Russia
- Region: Vologda Oblast
- District: Cherepovetsky District
- Time zone: UTC+3:00

Anisimovka (Russian: Анисимовка) is a rural locality (a village) in Myaksinskoye Rural Settlement, Cherepovetsky District, Vologda Oblast, Russia. The population was 5 as of 2002.

== Geography ==
Anisimovka is located 59 km (37 mi) southeast of Cherepovets (the district's administrative centre) by road. Dor is the nearest rural locality.
