= Armizonskoye =

Armizonskoye Армизонское
- Selo
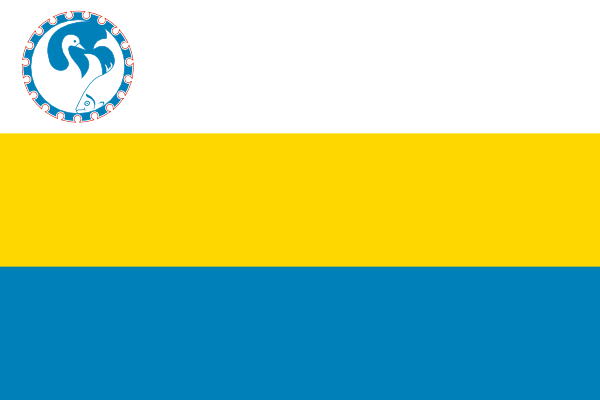
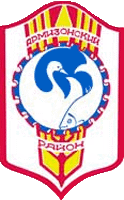
- Flag Coat of arms
- Interactive map of Armizonskoye
- Location of Armizonskoye Armizonskoye (Tyumen Oblast)
- Coordinates: 55°56′47″N 67°40′56″E
- Country: Russia
- Federal subject: Tyumen Oblast
- Administrative district: Armizonsky District
- SettlementSelsoviet: Armizonskoye Settlement
- Elevation: 135 m (443 ft)

Population (2010 Census)
  - Total: 4,776
  - Estimate (2021): 4,886 (+2.3%)

Administrative status
  - Capital of: Armizonsky District, Armizonskoye Settlement

Municipal status
  - Municipal district: Armizonsky Municipal District
  - Rural settlement: Armizonskoye Rural Settlement
  - Capital of: Armizonsky Municipal District, Armizonskoye Rural Settlement
- Time zone: UTC+5 (MSK+2)
- Postal code: 627220
- OKTMO ID: 71605405101

Armizonskoye (Russian: Армизонское) is a rural locality (a selo) and the administrative center of Armizonsky District of Tyumen Oblast, Russia. Population: 4,776 (2010 census); 4,741 (2002 census); 5,557 (1989 Soviet census).
