= Vagay, Vagaysky District, Tyumen Oblast =

Rural locality in Tyumen Oblast, Russia

Coordinates: 57°56′05″N 69°00′48″E

Flag of Vagay

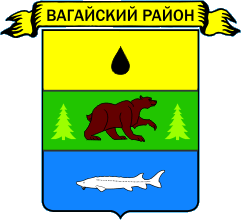
Coat of arms of Vagay

Vagay (Russian: Вагай) is a rural locality (a selo) and the administrative center of Vagaysky District, Tyumen Oblast, Russia. Population: 5,013 (2010 census); 4,983 (2002 census); 5,339 (1989 Soviet census).
