= Tyumensky District =

Tyumensky District Тюменский район (Russian)
- District
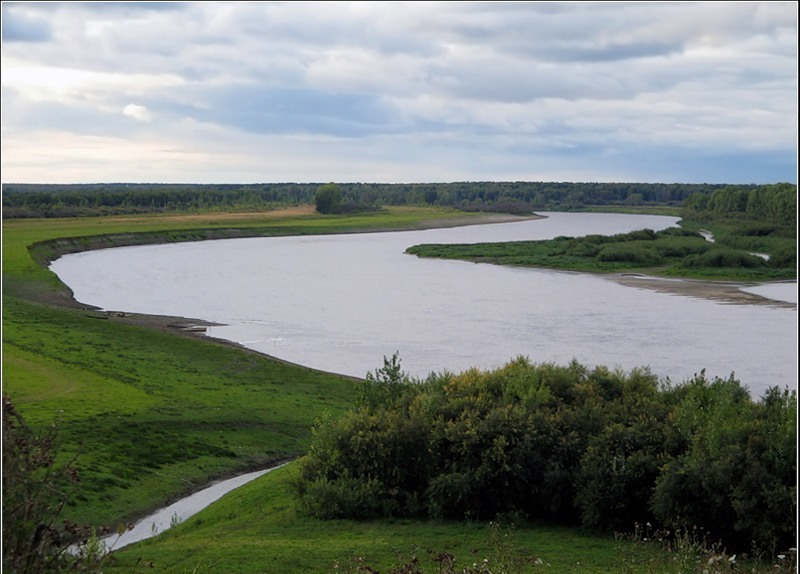
- The Tura River near the selo of Kamenka in Tyumensky District

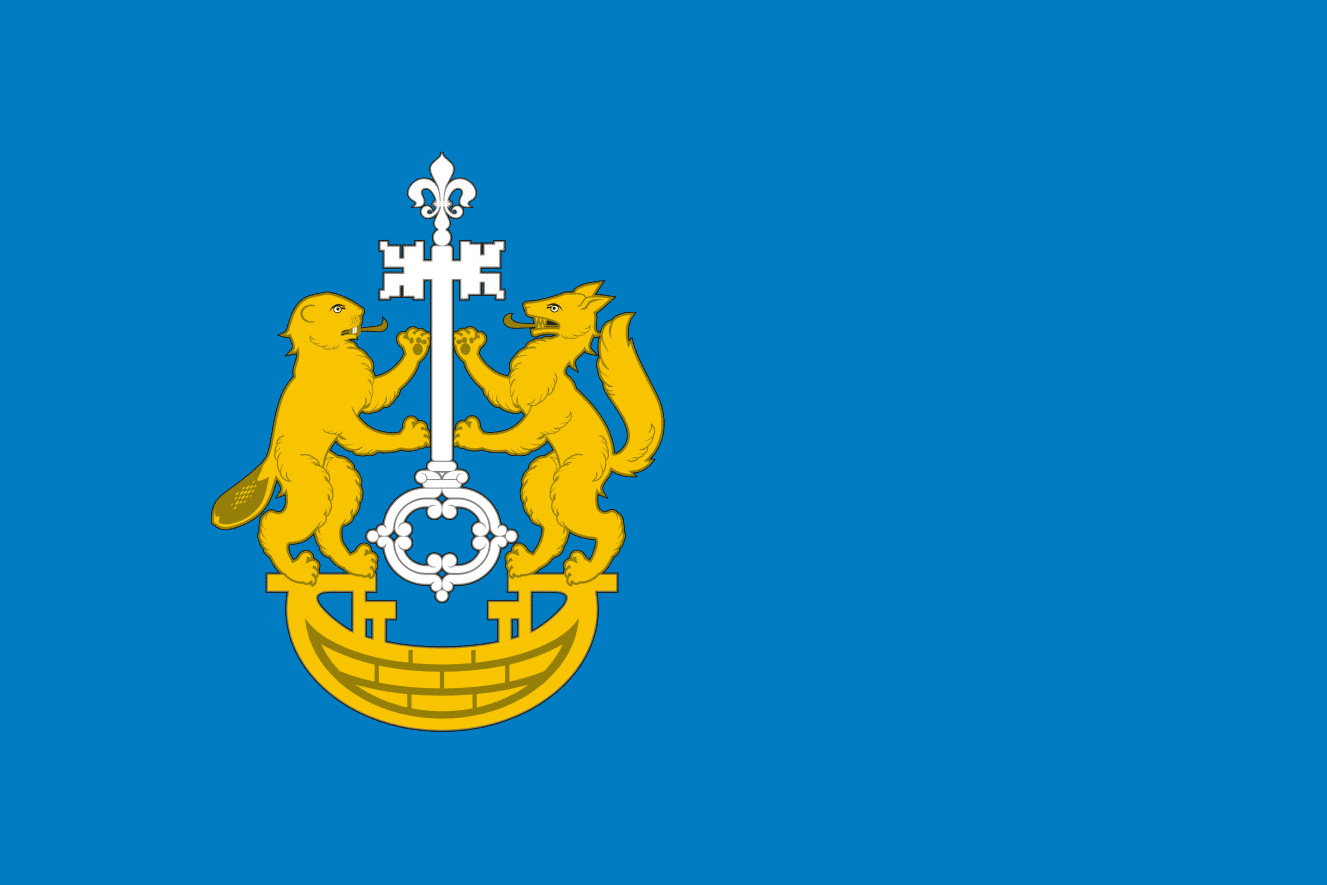
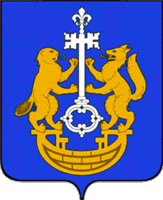
- Flag Coat of arms
- Location of Tyumensky District in Tyumen Oblast
- Coordinates: 57°10′N 65°30′E
- Country: Russia
- Federal subject: Tyumen Oblast
- Established: 1923
- Administrative center: Tyumen

Area
  - Total: 3,700 km^{2} (1,400 sq mi)

Population (2010 Census)
  - Total: 107,175
  - Density: 29/km^{2} (75/sq mi)
  - Urban: 0%
  - Rural: 100%

Administrative structure
  - Administrative divisions: 24 rural okrug
  - Inhabited localities: 3 urban-type settlements, 73 rural localities

Municipal structure
  - Municipally incorporated as: Tyumensky Municipal District
  - Municipal divisions: 0 urban settlements, 24 rural settlements
- Time zone: UTC+5 (MSK+2)
- OKTMO ID: 71644000
- Website: http://www.atmr.ru/

Tyumensky District (Russian: Тюме́нский райо́н) is an administrative district (raion), one of the twenty-two in Tyumen Oblast, Russia. Within the framework of municipal divisions, it is incorporated as Tyumensky Municipal District. It is located in the west of the oblast. The area of the district is 3,700 square kilometers (1,400 sq mi). Its administrative center is the city of Tyumen (which is not administratively a part of the district). Population: 107,175 (2010 Census); 93,248 (2002 census); 87,272 (1989 Soviet census).

== Administrative and municipal status ==
Within the framework of administrative divisions, Tyumensky District is one of the twenty-two in the oblast. The city of Tyumen serves as its administrative center, despite being incorporated separately as an administrative unit with the status equal to that of the districts.

As a municipal division, the district is incorporated as Tyumensky Municipal District. The city of Tyumen is incorporated separately from the district as Tyumen Urban Okrug.

The 3rd Arsenal GRAU (Military Unit Number 47156) was located in the Bogdanininsky village of the district, from its registration on 23 January 1978, until it was disbanded in 2014.
