= Tobolsky District =

Tobolsky District Тобольский район (Russian)
- District
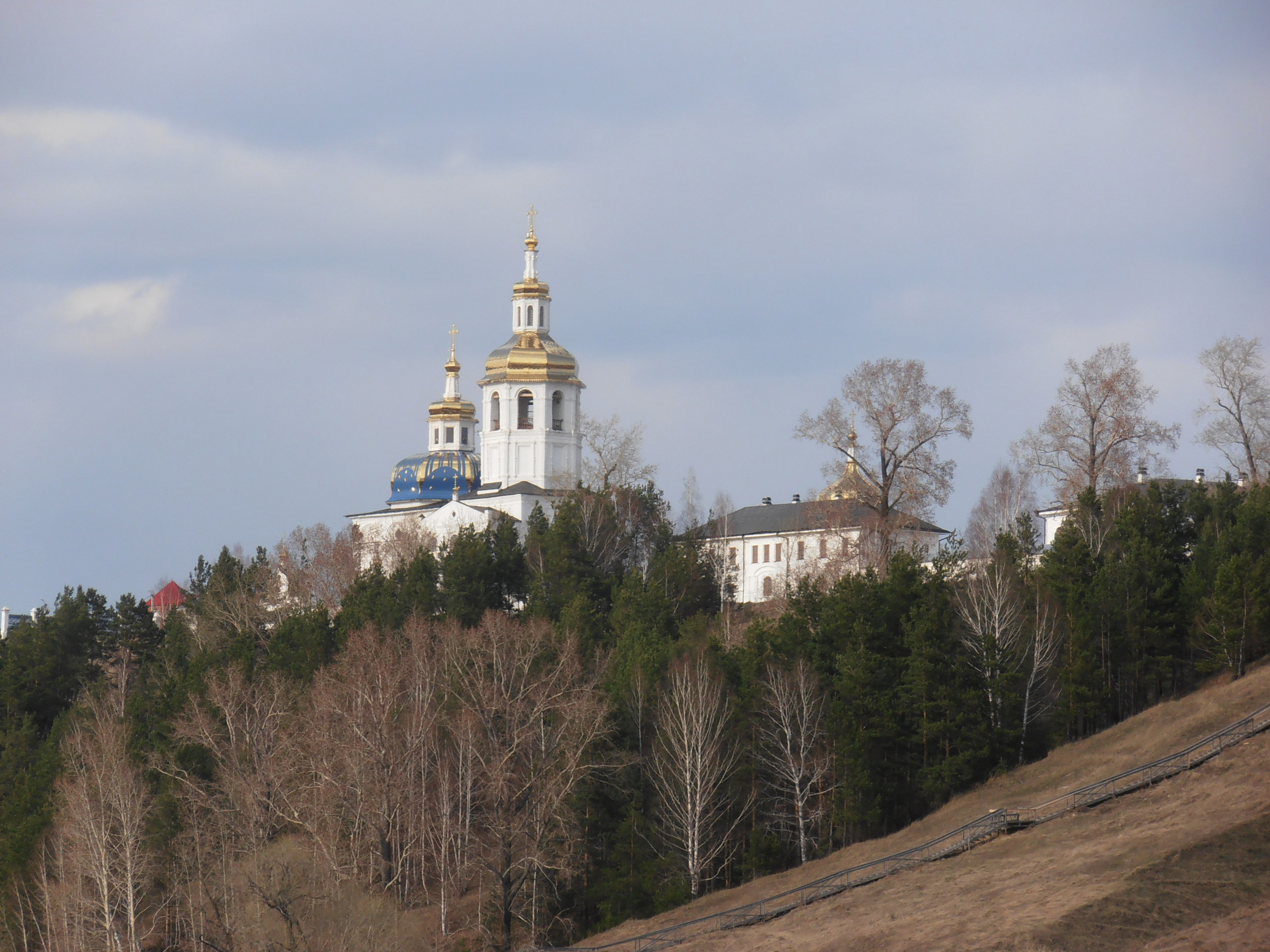
- Abalaksky Monastery, Tobolsky District

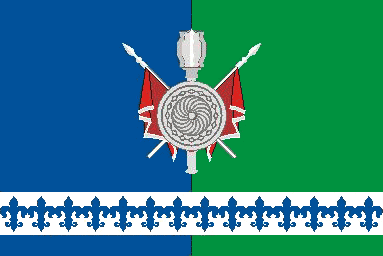
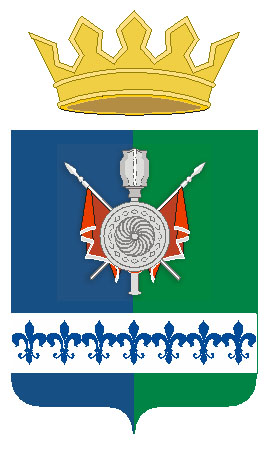
- Flag Coat of arms
- Location of Tobolsky District in Tyumen Oblast
- Coordinates: 58°12′N 68°15′E
- Country: Russia
- Federal subject: Tyumen Oblast
- Established: 1923
- Administrative center: Tobolsk

Area
  - Total: 17,222 km^{2} (6,649 sq mi)

Population (2010 Census)
  - Total: 22,354
  - Density: 1.2980/km^{2} (3.3618/sq mi)
  - Urban: 0%
  - Rural: 100%

Administrative structure
  - Administrative divisions: 22 rural okrug
  - Inhabited localities: 118 rural localities

Municipal structure
  - Municipally incorporated as: Tobolsky Municipal District
  - Municipal divisions: 0 urban settlements, 22 rural settlements
- Time zone: UTC+5 (MSK+2)
- OKTMO ID: 71642000

Tobolsky District (Russian: Тобо́льский райо́н) is an administrative district (raion), one of the twenty-two in Tyumen Oblast, Russia. Within the framework of municipal divisions, it is incorporated as Tobolsky Municipal District. It is located in the northwest of the oblast. The area of the district is 17,222 square kilometers (6,649 sq mi). Its administrative center is the town of Tobolsk (which is not administratively a part of the district). Population: 22,354 (2010 Census); 23,679 (2002 census); 29,661 (1989 Soviet census).

== Administrative and municipal status ==
Within the framework of administrative divisions, Tobolsky District is one of the twenty-two in the oblast. The town of Tobolsk serves as its administrative center, despite being incorporated separately as an administrative unit with the status equal to that of the districts.

As a municipal division, the district is incorporated as Tobolsky Municipal District. The Town of Tobolsk is incorporated separately from the district as Tobolsk Urban Okrug.
