= Omutinskoye =

Rural locality in Tyumen Oblast, Russia

Coordinates: 56°28′41″N 67°40′04″E

Omutinskoye (Russian: Омутинское) is a rural locality (a selo) and the administrative center of Omutinsky District, Tyumen Oblast, Russia. Population: 9,201 (2010 census); 9,657 (2002 census); 10,380 (1989 Soviet census).
