= Kalach, Sverdlovsk Oblast =

Settlement in Sverdlovsk Oblast, Russia

Kalach Калач
- Location of Kalach
- Location of Kalach Kalach (Sverdlovsk Oblast)
- Coordinates: 58°55′26″N 63°02′57″E
- Country: Russia
- Federal subject: Sverdlovsk Oblast
- Time zone: UTC+5 (MSK+2)
- Postal code(s): 624653, 624621
- OKTMO ID: 65769000231

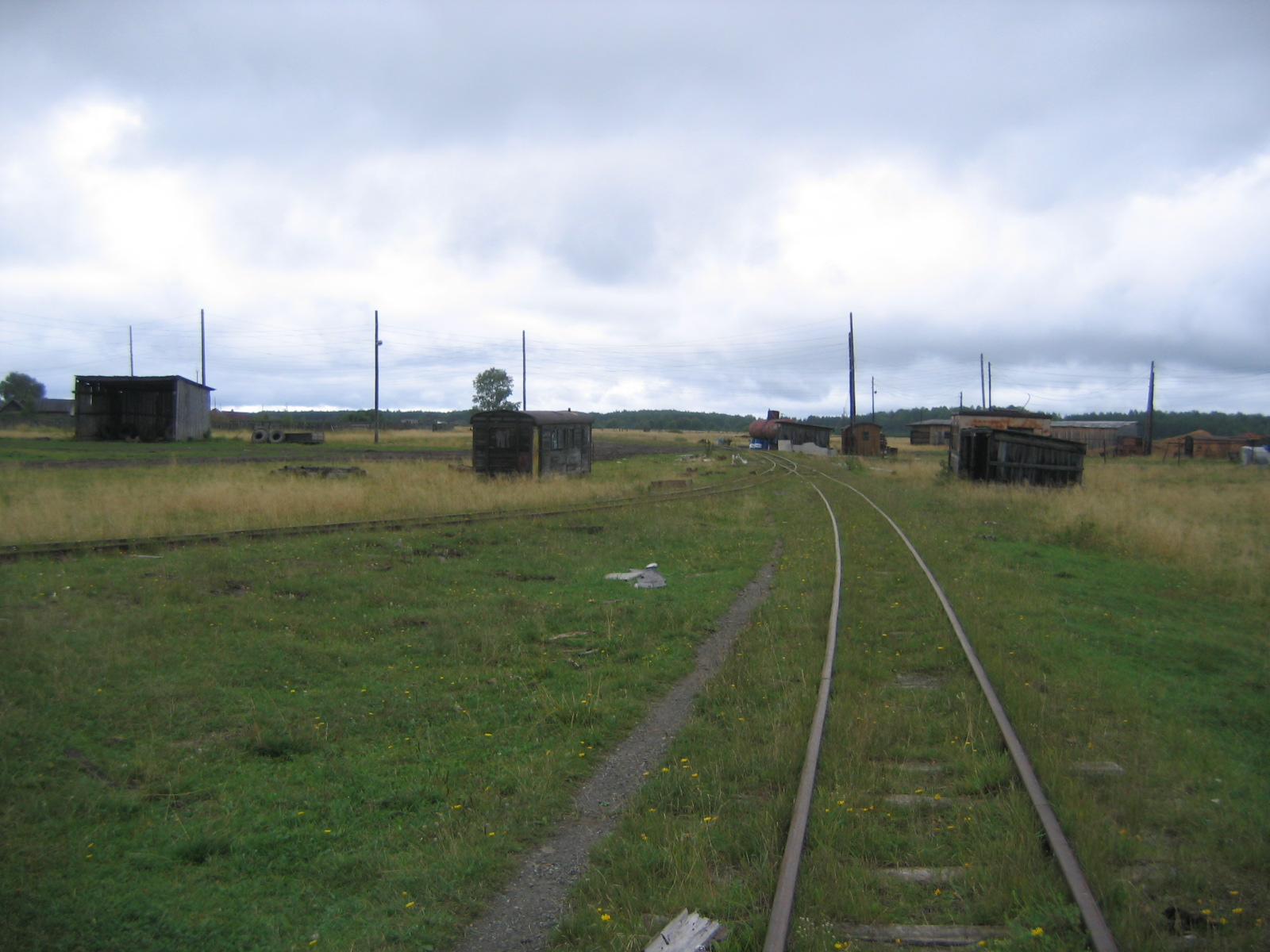
Kalach Station

Kalach (Russian: Калач) is a settlement in the Alapayevsky District in Sverdlovsk Oblast, Russia.

== Geography ==
Kalach is situated on the Yansayevka River, 34 kilometers from Cancino, the nearest settlement. Kalach is accessible by the Alapayevsk narrow gauge-railway.

== History ==
The Kalach settlement appeared in the beginning of the 20th century. In 1967, a section of the Alapayevsk narrow gauge-railway leading into Kalach was commissioned. From 1970 to 1973, lines leaving the settlement were built. On January 18, 1968, the Kalach village Soviet was established. The population of Kalach expanded, reaching 600 persons by the close of the 1980s. The settlement's main industry was timber. The population of the village quickly dwindled as the local timber industry declined. On August 28, 1991, Yuri Petrovich Lebedev became head of the autonomous village Soviet. Lyudmila Petrovna Kyulygina succeeded him.

== Infrastructure ==
Kalach is connected to the rest of Sverdlovsk Oblast by way of the rail line to Cancino. Thrice per week a train stops at Kalach Station, allowing people access to and from Kalach.

- The settlement is home to a diesel power plant that supplies electricity only in the morning and evening;
- Kalachinskaya Secondary School not been used since 2006;
- A brick general store, which has not been used since 2006;
- A kindergarten, which has been in use since 1995;
- A cellular communication tower.

== Population ==
Kalach's population stood at 206 in 2002. By 2008, only 90 people remained in Kalach. More than 30 of them worked in the logging industry. Much of the others worked in transportation. The population dropped to 53 by 2010. As of 2019, 13 people reside in Kalach.

== Notable people ==
- Ivan Kvitka, United Russia deputy in the State Duma
