= Boris Tarasov =

Russian military officer (1932–2021)

- Native name: Борис Васильевич Тарасов
- Born: 28 February 1932; Serpukhov, Moscow Oblast, Russian SFSR, Soviet Union
- Died: 16 June 2021 (aged 89)
- Buried: Federal Military Memorial Cemetery, Moscow Oblast
- Allegiance: Soviet Union; Russia
- Service years: 1954–1992
- Rank: Lieutenant General
- Awards: Two Orders of the Red Star; Order "For Service to the Homeland in the Armed Forces of the USSR" Second and Third Classes; Order of the Red Banner (Mongolia)

Boris Vasilyevich Tarasov (Russian: Борис Васильевич Тарасов; 28 February 1932 – 16 June 2021) was an officer of the Soviet military who held a number of posts, rising to deputy chief of the Communication Troops for military-political work, reaching the rank of lieutenant general. He was also a People's Deputy and member of the Supreme Soviet of Russia between 1990 and 1993.

Over his military career, Tarasov served in the Far Eastern, Transbaikal, North Caucasian, Volga-Ural, and Leningrad Military Districts, in the Central Group of Forces, as well as in Mongolia and Afghanistan. Specialising in political work, he ended his military career as a deputy chief, and on his retirement in 1992, concentrated on his political interests. Though he failed to be elected to the State Duma, he remained active in veterans' interests, and wrote his memoirs. He died in 2021 at the age of 89, having received numerous honours and awards.

== Military career ==
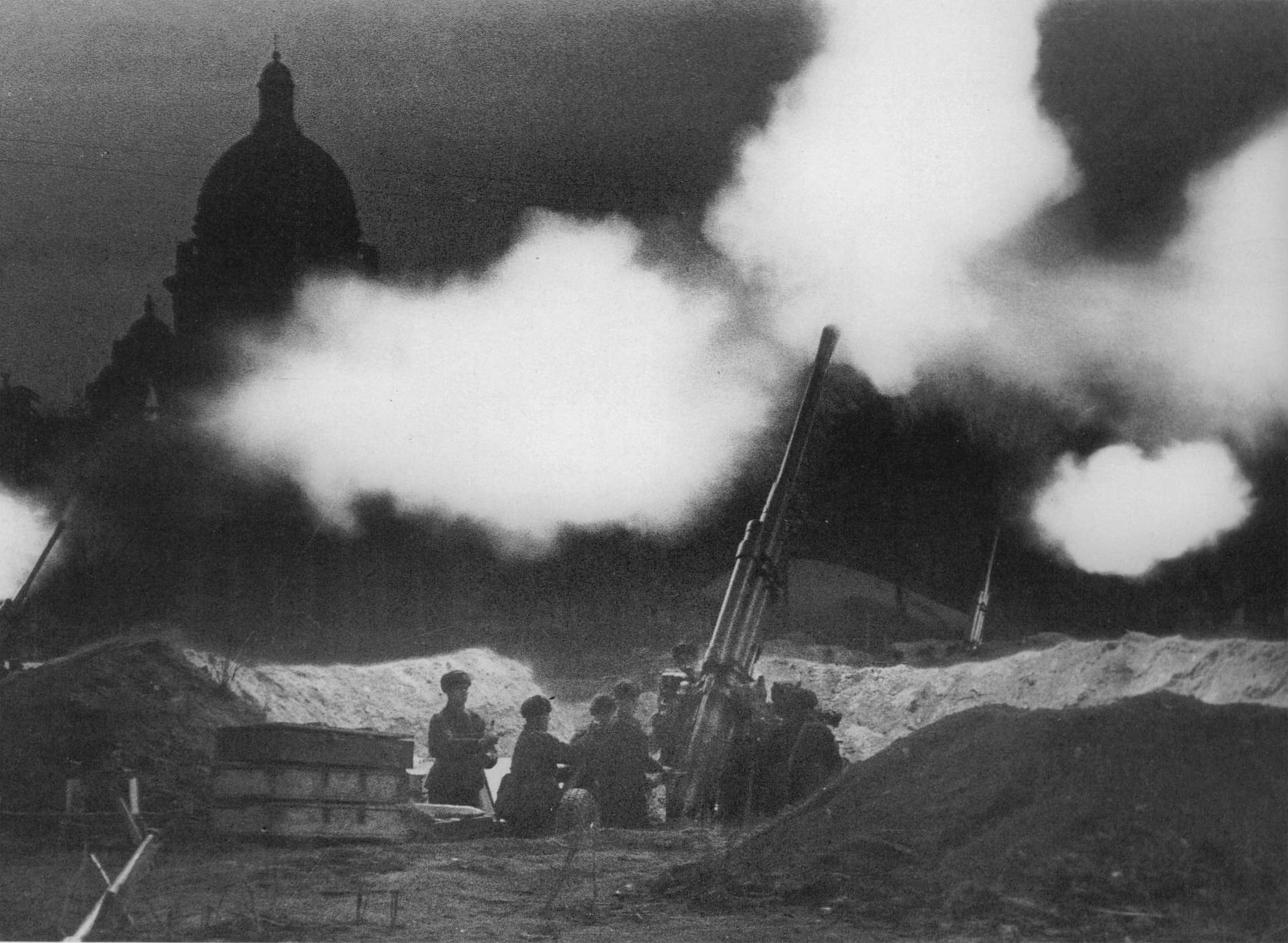
The Siege of Leningrad. Tarasov survived in the besieged city between 1941 and 1942.

Tarasov was born on 28 February 1932 in Serpukhov, Moscow Oblast, in what was then the Russian Soviet Federal Socialist Republic, in the Soviet Union. By the early 1940s he was living in Leningrad, and spent between 1941 and 1942 with his younger brothers and pregnant mother in the city during its siege during the Second World War. He began his career as a factory worker at the age of 14, while also studying at an evening school. After five years, he received the qualification of a metal worker, and completed ten years of secondary school.

He graduated from the Alma-Ata Airborne School in 1954 and began a long series of postings that took him all across the Soviet Union, starting as a platoon commander. From 1968 to 1975 he served in the Central Group of Forces, from 1970 as deputy chief, and then from 1972 as chief of the political department of a motorized rifle division. In 1969 he graduated from the Lenin Military-Political Academy. In 1975 he became chief of the political department of an Army Corps in the North Caucasian Military District, before becoming head of an Army political department in the Transbaikal Military District in 1979. In 1982 Tarasov became first deputy head of the Leningrad Military District's political administration, a post he held until 1984, when he was appointed first deputy head of the Southern Sector Troops' political directorate, in the Transcaucasian District. Then in 1987 he became a member of the military council and head of the political department of the Volga-Ural military district.

In early 1990 Tarasov was appointed deputy chief of the Communication Troops for military-political work, and also that year became a People's Deputy and member of the Supreme Soviet of Russia, and head of the parliamentary grouping "Fatherland". He retired from the armed forces in January 1992, and sat as a People's Deputy until 1993.

== Political career and later life ==
Between 1990 and 1993 Tarasov was a People's Deputy, and a member of the Supreme Soviet's Council of Nationalities. He was a member of the Commission of the Council of Nationalities on the national-state structure and interethnic relations, member of the "Fatherland" faction, and participated in the work of the "Military Service" group of deputies. In February 1995 he was elected deputy chairman of the Permanent Presidium of the Central Council of the All-Russian Assembly of Officers, and in August that year stood in the elections for the State Duma as a representative of the electoral bloc "Union of Patriots", but they failed to pass the 5% vote total to achieve representation. In retirement he published his memoirs of the siege of Leningrad, entitled The Blockade in My Destiny. In 2013 he became a leading inspector of the Combined Arms Academy, and regularly met with cadets and military personnel. He also gave lectures to the community and members of the Military Historical Society.

== Honours, and death ==
Tarasov died on 16 June 2021, at the age of 89. He was buried in the Federal Military Memorial Cemetery on 19 June. He was married, with a daughter. Over his career he had received numerous awards and honours, including Two Orders of the Red Star, the Order "For Service to the Homeland in the Armed Forces of the USSR" Second and Third Classes, and the Mongolian Order of the Red Banner. He had received the Certificate of Honour of the Moscow City Duma "For Services to the City Community" and the Badge of Honour "For Services to the Moscow Region", as well as the Order "For Services to the Communist Party of the Russian Federation".
