= Vikulovo, Tyumen Oblast =

Rural locality in Tyumen Oblast, Russia

Coordinates: 56°49′00″N 70°36′24″E

Vikulovo (Russian: Викулово) is a rural locality (a selo) and the administrative center of Vikulovsky District, Tyumen Oblast, Russia. Population: 6,995 (2010 census); 6,997 (2002 census); 6,751 (1989 Soviet census).
