= Golyshmanovsky District =

Golyshmanovsky District Голышмановский район
- District
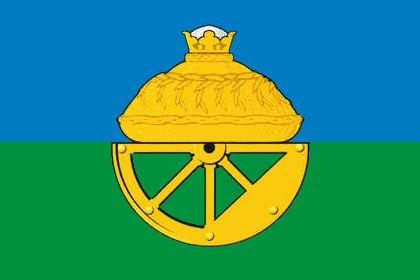
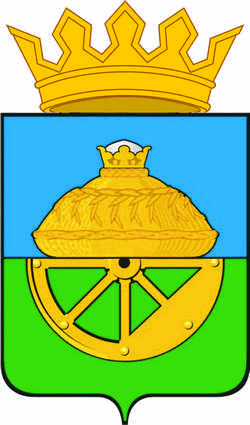
- Flag Coat of arms
- Location of Golyshmanovsky District in Tyumen Oblast
- Coordinates: 56°28′29″N 68°36′51″E
- Country: Russia
- Federal subject: Tyumen Oblast
- Established: 1923
- Administrative center: Golyshmanovo

Area
  - Total: 4,085 km^{2} (1,577 sq mi)

Population (2010 Census)
  - Total: 26,747
  - Density: 6.548/km^{2} (16.96/sq mi)
  - Urban: 0%
  - Rural: 100%

Administrative structure
  - Administrative divisions: 15 Rural okrugs
  - Inhabited localities: 1 urban-type settlements, 62 rural localities

Municipal structure
  - Municipally incorporated as: Golyshmanovsky Municipal District
  - Municipal divisions: 0 urban settlements, 15 rural settlements
- Time zone: UTC+5 (MSK+2)
- OKTMO ID: 71618000
- Website: http://golyshmanovo.admtyumen.ru/

Golyshmanovsky District (Russian: Голышма́новский райо́н) is an administrative district (raion), one of the twenty-two in Tyumen Oblast, Russia. As a municipal division, it is incorporated as Golyshmanovsky Municipal District. It is located in the south of the oblast. The area of the district is 4,085 square kilometers (1,577 sq mi). Its administrative center is the urban locality (a work settlement) of Golyshmanovo. Population: 26,747 (2010 Census); 27,907 (2002 Census); 29,265 (1989 Soviet census). The population of the administrative center accounts for 51.0% of the district's total population.

== Geography ==
Golyshmanovsky District is located in the south-central region of Tyumen OblastThe terrain is flat plain with a forest-steppe landscape. There are a large number of lakes (160 by one count) in rounded depressions. The lakes and the weak ridges between them follow the general course of ancient runoff to the northeast. About one-fourth of the land is arable cropland, and another fourth is pasture and meadow. The absolute height above sea level is 90-120 meters. The district is in the drainage of the Ishim River (to the east). The administrative center is the town of Golyshmanovo. Golyshmanovsky District is 215 km southeast of the city of Tyumen, 50 km west of the city of Ishim, and 1,850 km east of Moscow. The area measures 95 km (north-south), 65 km (west-east); total area is 4,100 km2 (about 0.003% of Tyumen Oblast).

The district is bordered on the north by Aromashevsky District, on the east by Ishimsky District, on the south by Armizonsky District and Berdyuzhsky District, and on the west by Omutinsky District.

== History ==
The first recorded settlement by Russians was in 1698 by ""the Tobolsk son Boyar Ivan Bobrowski and his comrades" who built a fortification at the confluence of the Vagay River and the Gremyachey River. During the 1700s, the area attracted immigrants, from Central Russia, seeking free land and absence of serfdom.

Golyshmanovsky District was officially formed in November 1923 as part of the Ishimsky district of the Ural Region. After a brief move to Chelyabinsk region in 1934 and then to Omsk Oblast for 1934-1944, the district was finally transferred to Tymen Oblast in 1944.
