= Zavodoukovsk =

Town in Tyumen Oblast, Russia

Zavodoukovsk Заводоуковск
- Town
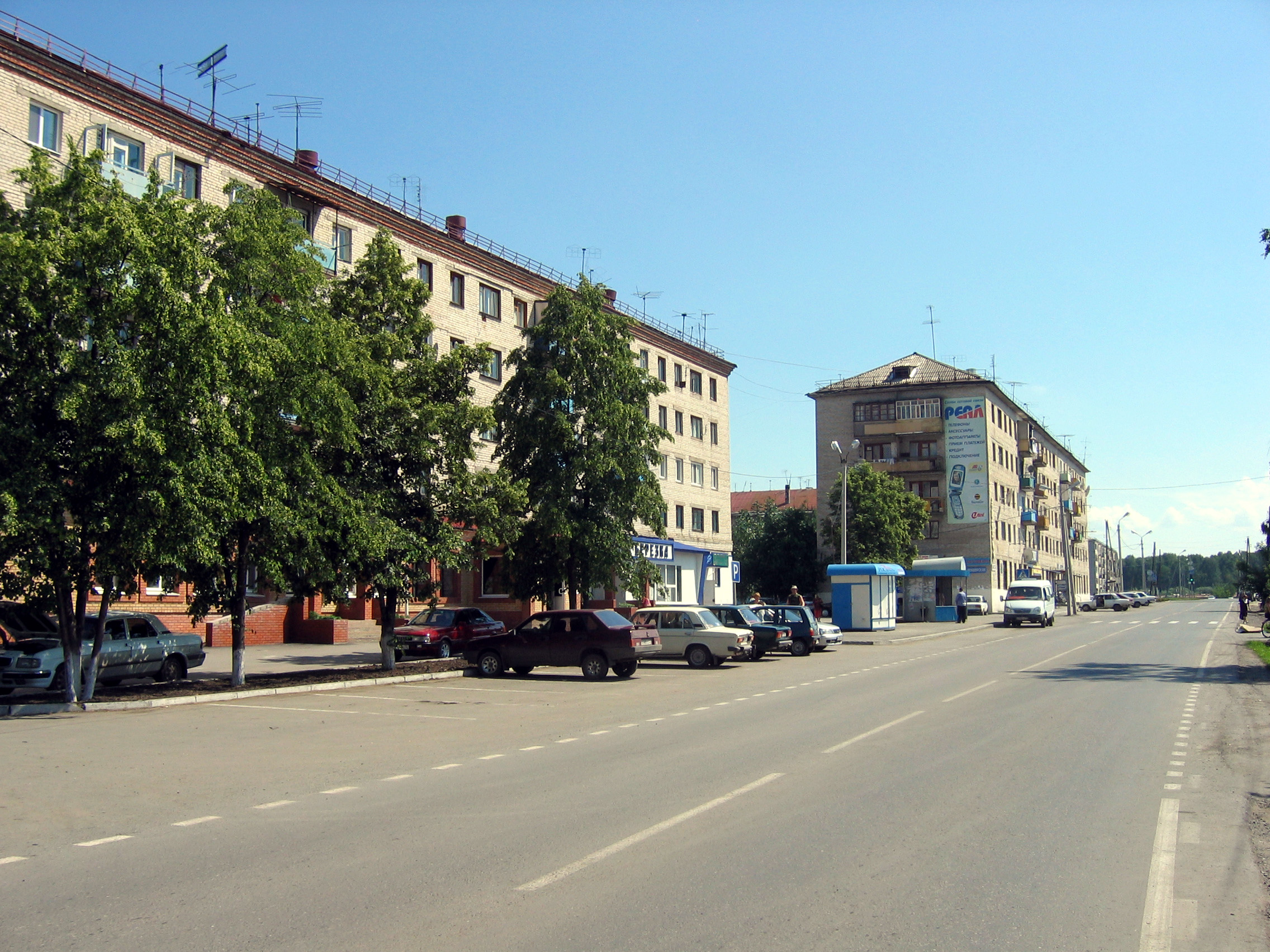
- Selmash microdistrict in Zavodoukovsk

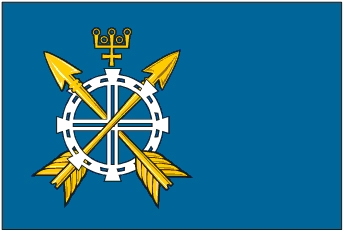
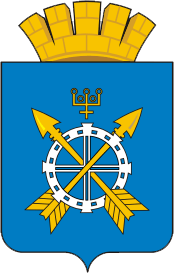
- Flag Coat of arms
- Interactive map of Zavodoukovsk
- Location of Zavodoukovsk Zavodoukovsk (Tyumen Oblast)
- Coordinates: 56°29′N 66°32′E
- Country: Russia
- Federal subject: Tyumen Oblast
- Founded: 1729
- Town status since: 1960

Government
  - Head of Administration: Maria Gliyun
- Elevation: 75 m (246 ft)

Population (2010 Census)
  - Total: 25,647
  - Estimate (2021): 27,100 (+5.7%)

Administrative status
  - Subordinated to: Town of Zavodoukovsk
  - Capital of: Zavodoukovsky District, Town of Zavodoukovsk

Municipal status
  - Urban okrug: Zavodoukovsky Urban Okrug
  - Capital of: Zavodoukovsky Urban Okrug
- Time zone: UTC+5 (MSK+2)
- Postal codes: 627139–627145, 627149
- Dialing code: +7 34542
- OKTMO ID: 71703000001
- Town Day: Last Sunday of June
- Website: www.zavodoukovsk.ru

Zavodoukovsk population
- 2010 Census: 25,647
- 2002 Census: 25,674
- 1989 Census: 25,827
- 1979 Census: 21,450

Zavodoukovsk (Russian: Заводоуко́вск) is a town in Tyumen Oblast, Russia, located on the Bolshoy Uk River (an arm of the Tobol) 96 kilometers (60 mi) southeast of Tyumen, the administrative center of the oblast. As of the 2010 Census, its population was 25,647.

== History ==
It was founded in 1729 as a village of Ukovskaya (Уко́вская). In 1787, it was renamed Zavodoukovskoye (Заводоуко́вское). It was granted urban-type settlement status in 1941 and town status in 1960.

== Administrative and municipal status ==
Within the framework of administrative divisions, Zavodoukovsk serves as the administrative center of Zavodoukovsky District, even though it is not a part of it. As an administrative division, it is incorporated separately as the Town of Zavodoukovsk—an administrative unit with a status equal to that of the districts. As a municipal division, the territories of the Town of Zavodoukovsk and of Zavodoukovsky District are incorporated as Zavodoukovsky Urban Okrug.
