= Aromashevo =

Aromashevo Аромашево
- Selo
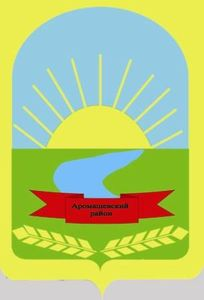
- Flag Coat of arms
- Interactive map of Aromashevo
- Location of Aromashevo Aromashevo (Tyumen Oblast)
- Coordinates: 56°52′04″N 68°38′43″E
- Country: Russia
- Federal subject: Tyumen Oblast
- Administrative district: Aromashevsky District
- SettlementSelsoviet: Aromashevskoye Settlement
- Founded: 1630
- Elevation: 76 m (249 ft)

Population (2010 Census)
  - Total: 5,373
  - Estimate (2021): 5,420 (+0.9%)

Administrative status
  - Capital of: Aromashevsky District, Aromashevskoye Settlement

Municipal status
  - Municipal district: Aromashevsky Municipal District
  - Rural settlement: Aromashevskoye Rural Settlement
  - Capital of: Aromashevsky Municipal District, Aromashevskoye Rural Settlement
- Time zone: UTC+5 (MSK+2)
- Postal code: 627350
- OKTMO ID: 71607405101

Aromashevo (Russian: Аромашево) is a rural locality (a selo) and the administrative center of Aromashevsky District of Tyumen Oblast, Russia. Population: 5,373 (2010 census); 5,609 (2002 census); 6,050 (1989 Soviet census).
