= Golyshmanovo (urban locality) =

Urban locality in Tyumen Oblast, Russia

Coordinates: 56°23′36″N 68°22′45″E

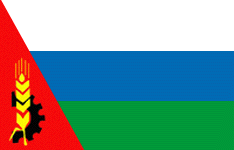
Flag of Golyshmanovo

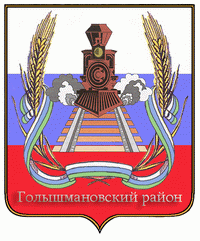
Coat of arms of Golishmanovo

Golyshmanovo (Russian: Голышманово) is an urban locality (work settlement) and the administrative center of Golyshmanovsky District of Tyumen Oblast, Russia. Population: 13,634 (2010 census); 13,510 (2002 census); 12,810 (1989 Soviet census).
