= Berdyuzhsky District =

Berdyuzhsky District Бердюжский район
- District
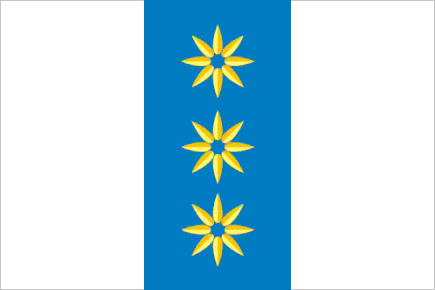
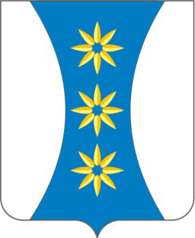
- Flag Coat of arms
- Location of Berdyuzhsky District in Tyumen Oblast
- Coordinates: 55°48′15″N 68°18′00″E
- Country: Russia
- Federal subject: Tyumen Oblast
- Established: 1923
- Administrative center: Berdyuzhye

Area
  - Total: 2,800 km^{2} (1,100 sq mi)

Population (2010 Census)
  - Total: 11,490
  - Density: 4.1/km^{2} (11/sq mi)
  - Urban: 0%
  - Rural: 100%

Administrative structure
  - Administrative divisions: 9 Rural okrugs
  - Inhabited localities: 30 rural localities

Municipal structure
  - Municipally incorporated as: Berdyuzhsky Municipal District
  - Municipal divisions: 0 urban settlements, 9 rural settlements
- Time zone: UTC+5 (MSK+2)
- OKTMO ID: 71610000
- Website: http://berdyuje.admtyumen.ru/mo/Berdyuje/index.htm

Berdyuzhsky District (Russian: Бердю́жский райо́н) is an administrative district (raion), one of the twenty-two in Tyumen Oblast, Russia. As a municipal division, it is incorporated as Berdyuzhsky Municipal District. It is located in the south of the oblast. The area of the district is 2,800 square kilometers (1,100 sq mi). Its administrative center is the rural locality (a selo) of Berdyuzhye. Population: 11,490 (2010 Census); 13,019 (2002 Census); 14,659 (1989 Soviet census). The population of Berdyuzhye accounts for 44.9% of the district's total population.

== Geography ==
Berdyuzhsky District is located in the south of Tyumen Oblast, on the border with Kurgan Oblast, and near the Kazakhstan–Russia border. The terrain is flat upland of forest-steppe landscape. There are numerous lakes (approximately 256) in elongated chains that follow the general course of ancient runoff to the northeast. The largest lake is Siverga. A significant portion of the district is agricultural land. The district is on the eastern extent of the inter-river region of the drainages of the Tobol River (to the west) and the Ishim River (to the east). The administrative center is the town of Berdyuzhye. Berdyuzhsky District is 384 km east of the city of Tyumen, 50 km north of the city of Petropavl, Kazakhstan, and 1,800 km east of Moscow. The area measures 75 km (north-south), 50 km (west-east); total area is 2,800 km2 (about 0.003% of Tyumen Oblast).

The district is bordered on the north by Golyshmanovsky District, on the east by Kazansky District, on the south by Mokrousovsky District of Kurgan Oblast, and on the west by Armizonsky District.

== History ==
Before joining to Russia as part of Siberia, the area was inhabited by Tatars and nomadic herders of southern Turkic peoples. The first mention of Russian settlement is the building of a string of military strongholds in the late 1600s. Agricultural settlement followed, mostly farmers from central Russia, and the area records the arrival of conscripts who had been involved in Pugachev's Rebellion in the late 1700s. 150 residents killed during the peasant uprising in the 1920s are buried in a mass grave in the central park of Berdyuzhye. Berdyuzhsky District was officially formed in July 1923 as part of the Ishimsky district of the Ural Region.
