= Uporovsky District =

Uporovsky District Упоровский район (Russian)
- District
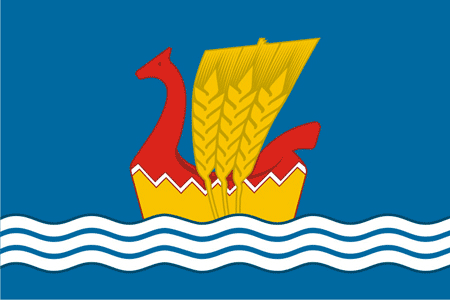
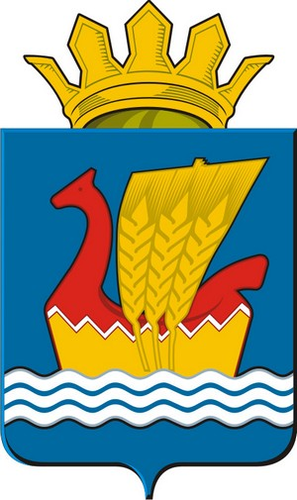
- Flag Coat of arms
- Location of Uporovsky District in Tyumen Oblast
- Coordinates: 56°18′N 66°18′E
- Country: Russia
- Federal subject: Tyumen Oblast
- Established: 1932
- Administrative center: Uporovo

Area
  - Total: 3,008 km^{2} (1,161 sq mi)

Population (2010 Census)
  - Total: 20,662
  - Density: 6.869/km^{2} (17.79/sq mi)
  - Urban: 0%
  - Rural: 100%

Administrative structure
  - Administrative divisions: 14 Rural okrugs
  - Inhabited localities: 56 rural localities

Municipal structure
  - Municipally incorporated as: Uporovsky Municipal District
  - Municipal divisions: 0 urban settlements, 14 rural settlements
- Time zone: UTC+5 (MSK+2)
- OKTMO ID: 71650000
- Website: https://uporovo.admtyumen.ru/mo/Uporovo/index.htm

Uporovsky District (Russian: Упо́ровский райо́н) is an administrative district (raion), one of the twenty-two in Tyumen Oblast, Russia. As a municipal division, it is incorporated as Uporovsky Municipal District. It is located in the southwest of the oblast. The area of the district is 3,008 square kilometers (1,161 sq mi). Its administrative center is the rural locality (a selo) of Uporovo. Population: 20,662 (2010 Census); 20,865 (2002 census); 22,159 (1989 Soviet census). The population of Uporovo accounts for 28.3% of the district's total population.

== See also ==
- Ingala Valley

== Sources ==
- Тюменская областная Дума. Закон №53 от 4 ноября 1996 г. «Об административно-территориальном устройстве Тюменской области», в ред. Закона №47 от 7 мая 2015 г. «О внесении изменений в статьи 14 и 15 Закона Тюменской области "Об административно-территориальном устройстве Тюменской области"». Вступил в силу с момента официального опубликования. Опубликован: "Тюменские известия", №220, 12 ноября 1996 г. (Tyumen Oblast Duma. Law #53 of November 4, 1996 On the Administrative-Territorial Structure of Tyumen Oblast, as amended by the Law #47 of May 7, 2015 On Amending Articles 14 and 15 of the Law of Tyumen Oblast "On the Administrative-Territorial Structure of Tyumen Oblast". Effective as of the moment of official publication.).
- Тюменская областная Дума. Закон №263 от 5 ноября 2004 г. «Об установлении границ муниципальных образований Тюменской области и наделении их статусом муниципального района, городского округа и сельского поселения», в ред. Закона №39 от 7 мая 2015 г. «Об упразднении деревни Бурмистрова Балаганского сельского поселения Викуловского муниципального района Тюменской области и внесении изменений в отдельные Законы Тюменской области». Вступил в силу 1 января 2005 г. Опубликован: "Тюменская область сегодня", №213 (без приложений), 12 ноября 2004 г. (Tyumen Oblast Duma. Law #263 of November 5, 2004 On Establishing the Borders of the Municipal Formations of Tyumen Oblast and on Granting Them the Status of a Municipal District, Urban Okrug, and Rural Settlement, as amended by the Law #39 of May 7, 2015 On Abolishing the Village of Burmistrova in Balaganskoye Rural Settlement of Vikulovsky Municipal District of Tyumen Oblast and on Amending Various Laws of Tyumen Oblast. Effective as of January 1, 2005.).
