= Yalutorovsk =

Town in Tyumen Oblast, Russia

Yalutorovsk Ялуторовск
- Town
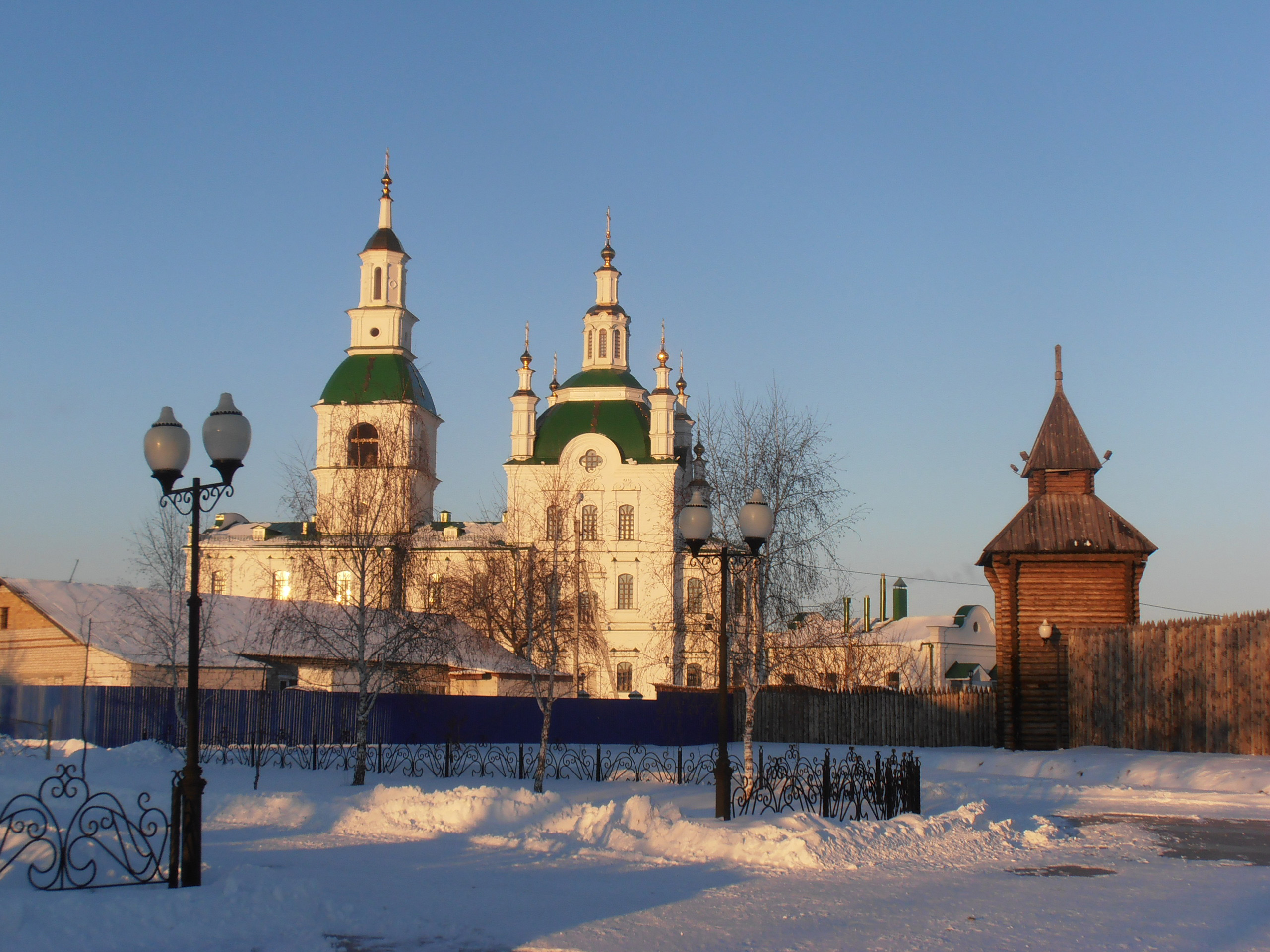

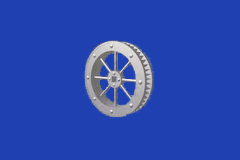
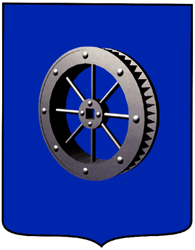
- Flag Coat of arms
- Interactive map of Yalutorovsk
- Location of Yalutorovsk Yalutorovsk (Tyumen Oblast)
- Coordinates: 56°39′N 66°17′E
- Country: Russia
- Federal subject: Tyumen Oblast
- Founded: 1639
- Town status since: 1782

Government
  - Head of Administration: Vladimir Zimnev
- Elevation: 60 m (200 ft)

Population (2010 Census)
  - Total: 36,493
  - Estimate (2025): 38,824 (+6.4%)

Administrative status
  - Subordinated to: Town of Yalutorovsk
  - Capital of: Yalutorovsky District, Town of Yalutorovsk

Municipal status
  - Urban okrug: Yalutorovsk Urban Okrug
  - Capital of: Yalutorovsk Urban Okrug, Yalutorovsky Municipal District
- Time zone: UTC+5 (MSK+2)
- Postal code: 627010
- Dialing code: +7 34535
- OKTMO ID: 71715000001
- Town Day: Second Sunday of July

Yalutorovsk (Russian: Ялу́торовск) is a town in Tyumen Oblast, Russia, located on the Tobol River 75 kilometers (47 mi) southeast of Tyumen. Population: 36,493 (2010 census); 36,088 (2002 census); 36,841 (1989 Soviet census).

== History ==
It was founded in 1659 as the settlement of Yalutorovsky (Ялуторовский) and was granted town status in 1782.

== Administrative and municipal status ==
Within the framework of administrative divisions, it serves as the administrative center of Yalutorovsky District, even though it is not a part of it. As an administrative division, it is incorporated separately as the Town of Yalutorovsk—an administrative unit with the status equal to that of the districts. As a municipal division, the Town of Yalutorovsk is incorporated as Yalutorovsk Urban Okrug.

== Economy ==
There are 2 confectionery factories in the city, which belong to "Dalmatovo" - "Konditerskaya fabrika "Kurazh" and "Fabrika Pechen'ya".

== See also ==
- Savva Mamontov
