= Sorokinsky District =

Sorokinsky District Сорокинский район (Russian)
- District
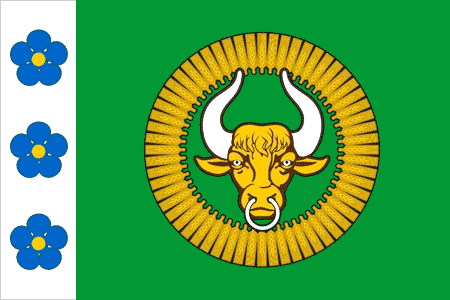
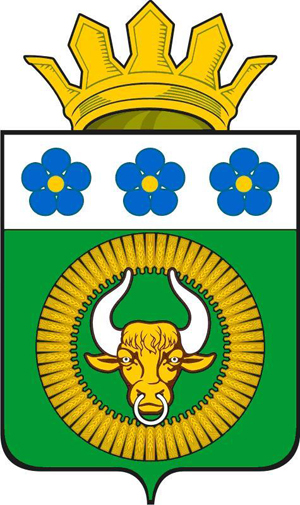
- Flag Coat of arms
- Location of Sorokinsky District in Tyumen Oblast
- Coordinates: 56°37′53″N 69°48′43″E
- Country: Russia
- Federal subject: Tyumen Oblast
- Established: 1923
- Administrative center: Bolshoye Sorokino

Area
  - Total: 2,700 km^{2} (1,000 sq mi)

Population (2010 Census)
  - Total: 10,254
  - Density: 3.8/km^{2} (9.8/sq mi)
  - Urban: 0%
  - Rural: 100%

Administrative structure
  - Administrative divisions: 7 Rural okrugs
  - Inhabited localities: 31 rural localities

Municipal structure
  - Municipally incorporated as: Sorokinsky Municipal District
  - Municipal divisions: 0 urban settlements, 7 rural settlements
- Time zone: UTC+5 (MSK+2)
- OKTMO ID: 71638000
- Website: http://sorokino.admtyumen.ru/

Sorokinsky District (Russian: Соро́кинский райо́н) is an administrative district (raion), one of the twenty-two in Tyumen Oblast, Russia. As a municipal division, it is incorporated as Sorokinsky Municipal District. It is located in the east of the oblast. The area of the district is 2,700 square kilometers (1,000 sq mi). Its administrative center is the rural locality (a selo) of Bolshoye Sorokino. Population: 10,254 (2010 Census); 11,801 (2002 Census); 13,590 (1989 Soviet census). The population of Bolshoye Sorokino accounts for 51.9% of the district's total population.
