= Vikulovsky District =

Vikulovsky District Викуловский район (Russian)
- District
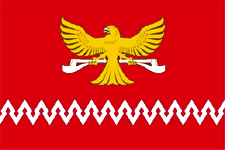
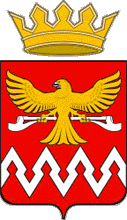
- Flag Coat of arms
- Location of Vikulovsky District in Tyumen Oblast
- Coordinates: 56°49′N 70°37′E
- Country: Russia
- Federal subject: Tyumen Oblast
- Established: 3 November 1923
- Administrative center: Vikulovo

Area
  - Total: 5,800 km^{2} (2,200 sq mi)

Population (2010 Census)
  - Total: 16,435
  - Density: 2.8/km^{2} (7.3/sq mi)
  - Urban: 0%
  - Rural: 100%

Administrative structure
  - Administrative divisions: 14 Rural okrugs
  - Inhabited localities: 54 rural localities

Municipal structure
  - Municipally incorporated as: Vikulovsky Municipal District
  - Municipal divisions: 0 urban settlements, 14 rural settlements
- Time zone: UTC+5 (MSK+2)
- OKTMO ID: 71615000
- Website: http://vikulovo.admtyumen.ru/mo/Vikulovo/index.htm

Vikulovsky District (Russian: Ви́куловский райо́н) is an administrative district (raion), one of the twenty-two in Tyumen Oblast, Russia. As a municipal division, it is incorporated as Vikulovsky Municipal District. It is located in the east of the oblast. The area of the district is 5,800 square kilometers (2,200 sq mi). Its administrative center is the rural locality (a selo) of Vikulovo. Population: 16,435 (2010 Census); 18,383 (2002 Census); 20,349 (1989 Soviet census). The population of Vikulovo accounts for 42.6% of the district's total population.
