= Vagaysky District =

Vagaysky District Вагайский район (Russian)
- District
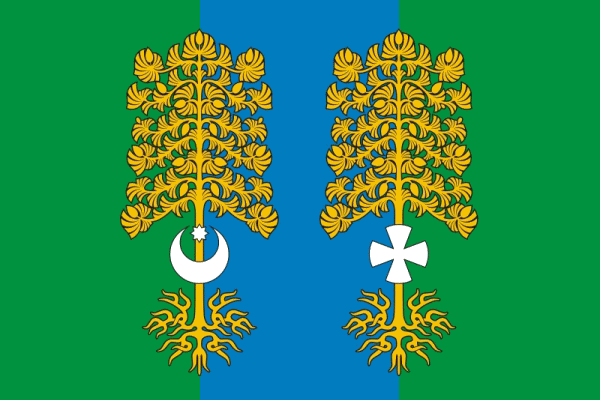
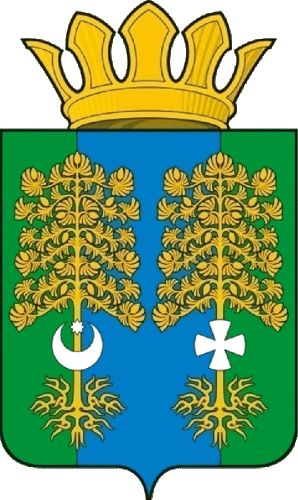
- Flag Coat of arms
- Location of Vagaysky District in Tyumen Oblast
- Coordinates: 57°56′05″N 69°00′49″E
- Country: Russia
- Federal subject: Tyumen Oblast
- Established: 1932
- Administrative center: Vagay

Area
  - Total: 18,400 km^{2} (7,100 sq mi)

Population (2010 Census)
  - Total: 22,539
  - Density: 1.22/km^{2} (3.17/sq mi)
  - Urban: 0%
  - Rural: 100%

Administrative structure
  - Administrative divisions: 19 Rural okrugs
  - Inhabited localities: 115 rural localities

Municipal structure
  - Municipally incorporated as: Vagaysky Municipal District
  - Municipal divisions: 0 urban settlements, 19 rural settlements
- Time zone: UTC+5 (MSK+2)
- OKTMO ID: 71613000
- Website: http://vagai.admtyumen.ru/

Vagaysky District (Russian: Вага́йский райо́н) is an administrative district (raion), one of the twenty-two in Tyumen Oblast, Russia. As a municipal division, it is incorporated as Vagaysky Municipal District. It is located in the east of the oblast. The area of the district is 18,400 square kilometers (7,100 sq mi). Its administrative center is the rural locality (a selo) of Vagay. Population: 22,539 (2010 Census); 24,561 (2002 census); 27,801 (1989 Soviet census). The population of Vagay accounts for 22.2% of the district's total population.
