= Zavodoukovsky Urban Okrug =

Zavodoukovsky Urban Okrug (Russian: Заводоуковский городско́й о́круг) is a municipal formation (an urban okrug) in Tyumen Oblast, Russia, one of the five urban okrugs in the oblast. Its territory comprises the territories of two administrative divisions of Tyumen Oblast—Zavodoukovsky District and the Town of Zavodoukovsk.

The urban okrug was established by the Law of Tyumen Oblast #263 of November 5, 2004.

== Zavodoukovsky District ==
Zavodoukovsky District Заводоуковский район
- District
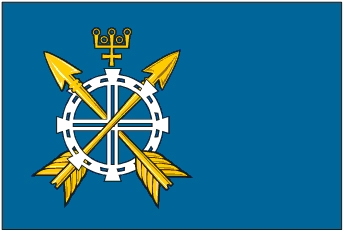
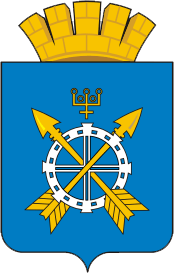
- Flag Coat of arms
- Location of Zavodoukovsky District in Tyumen Oblast
- Coordinates: 56°40′N 66°18′E
- Country: Russia
- Federal subject: Tyumen Oblast
- Administrative center: Zavodoukovsk

Area
  - Total: 2,800 km^{2} (1,100 sq mi)

Population (2010 Census)
  - Total: 21,101
  - Density: 7.5/km^{2} (20/sq mi)
  - Urban: 0%
  - Rural: 100%

Administrative structure
  - Inhabited localities: 46 rural localities

Municipal structure
  - Municipally incorporated as: Zavodoukovsky Urban Okrug
- Time zone: UTC+5 (MSK+2)
- OKTMO ID: 71703000
- Website: https://zavodoukovsk.admtyumen.ru/

Zavodoukovsky District (Russian: Заводоуко́вский райо́н) is an administrative district (raion), one of the twenty-two in Tyumen Oblast, Russia. As a municipal division, it is a part of Zavodoukovsky Urban Okrug. It is located in the southwest of the oblast. The area of the district is 2,800 square kilometers (1,100 sq mi). Its administrative center is the town of Zavodoukovsk (which is not administratively a part of the district). Population: 21,101 (2010 Census); 22,708 (2002 Census); 49,304 (1989 Soviet census).
