= Yalutorovsky District =

Yalutorovsky District Ялуторовский район (Russian)
- District
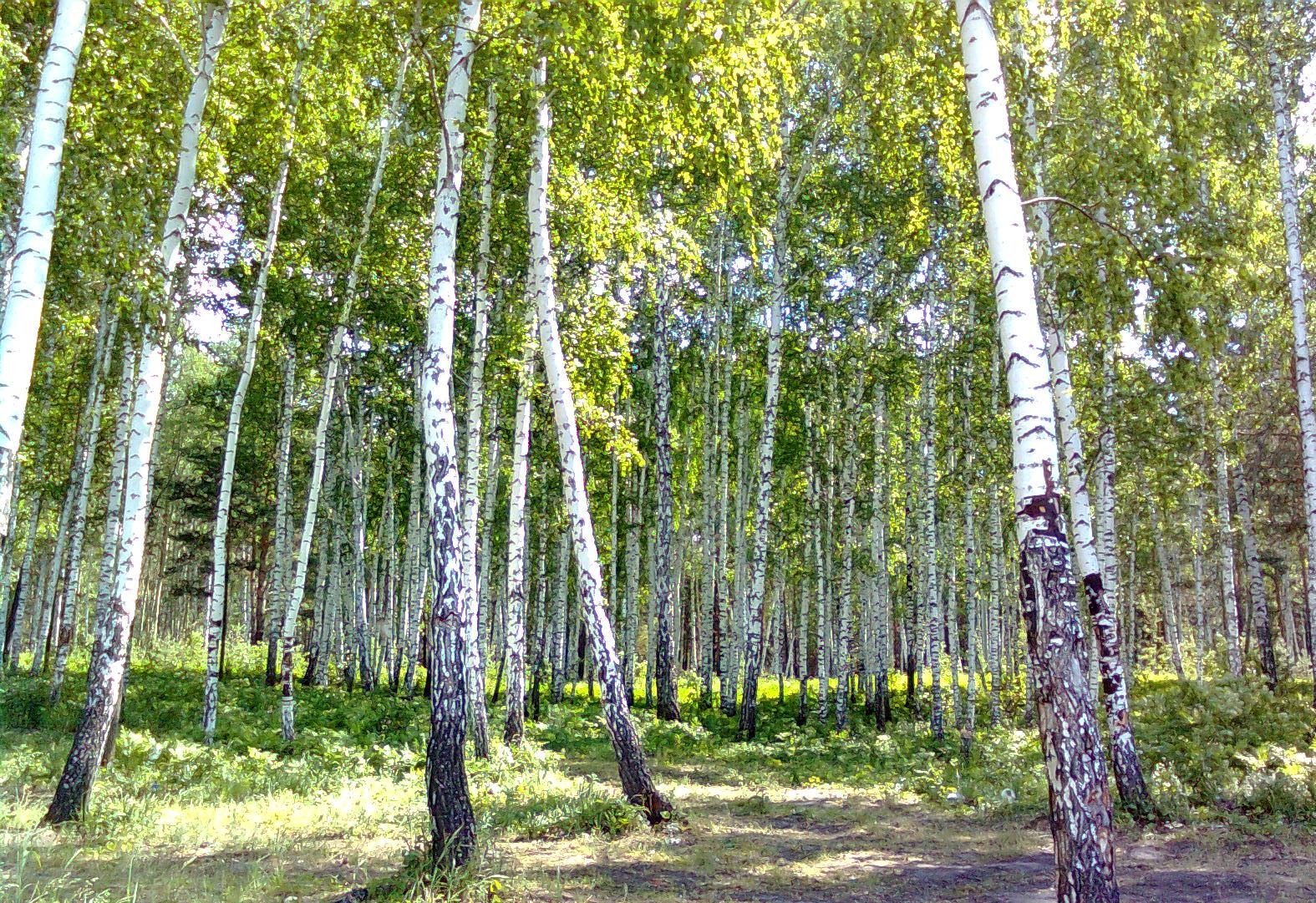
- Singulsky Forest, Yalutorovsky District

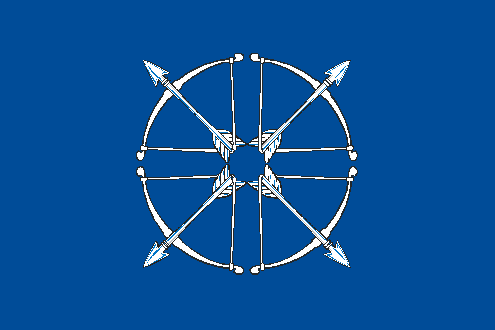
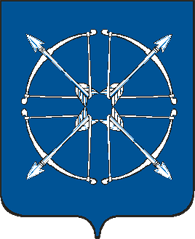
- Flag Coat of arms
- Location of Yalutorovsky District in Tyumen Oblast
- Coordinates: 56°40′N 66°18′E
- Country: Russia
- Federal subject: Tyumen Oblast
- Administrative center: Yalutorovsk

Area
  - Total: 2,800 km^{2} (1,100 sq mi)

Population (2010 Census)
  - Total: 14,461
  - Density: 5.2/km^{2} (13/sq mi)
  - Urban: 0%
  - Rural: 100%

Administrative structure
  - Administrative divisions: 15 rural okrug
  - Inhabited localities: 40 rural localities

Municipal structure
  - Municipally incorporated as: Yalutorovsky Municipal District
  - Municipal divisions: 0 urban settlements, 15 rural settlements
- Time zone: UTC+5 (MSK+2)
- OKTMO ID: 71656000
- Website: https://yalutorovsk-mr.admtyumen.ru/mo/Yalutorovsk-mr/index.htm

Yalutorovsky District (Russian: Ялу́торовский райо́н) is an administrative district (raion), one of the twenty-two in Tyumen Oblast, Russia. Within the framework of municipal divisions, it is incorporated as Yalutorovsky Municipal District. It is located in the west of the oblast. The area of the district is 2,800 square kilometers (1,100 sq mi). Its administrative center is the town of Yalutorovsk (which is not administratively a part of the district). Population: 14,461 (2010 Census); 15,799 (2002 census); 16,696 (1989 Soviet census).

== Administrative and municipal status ==
Within the framework of administrative divisions, Yalutorovsky District is one of the twenty-two in the oblast. The town of Yalutorovsk serves as its administrative center, despite being incorporated separately as an administrative unit with the status equal to that of the districts.

As a municipal division, the district is incorporated as Yalutorovsky Municipal District. The Town of Yalutorovsk is incorporated separately from the district as Yalutorovsk Urban Okrug.
