= Omutinsky District =

Omutinsky District Омутинский район (Russian)
- District
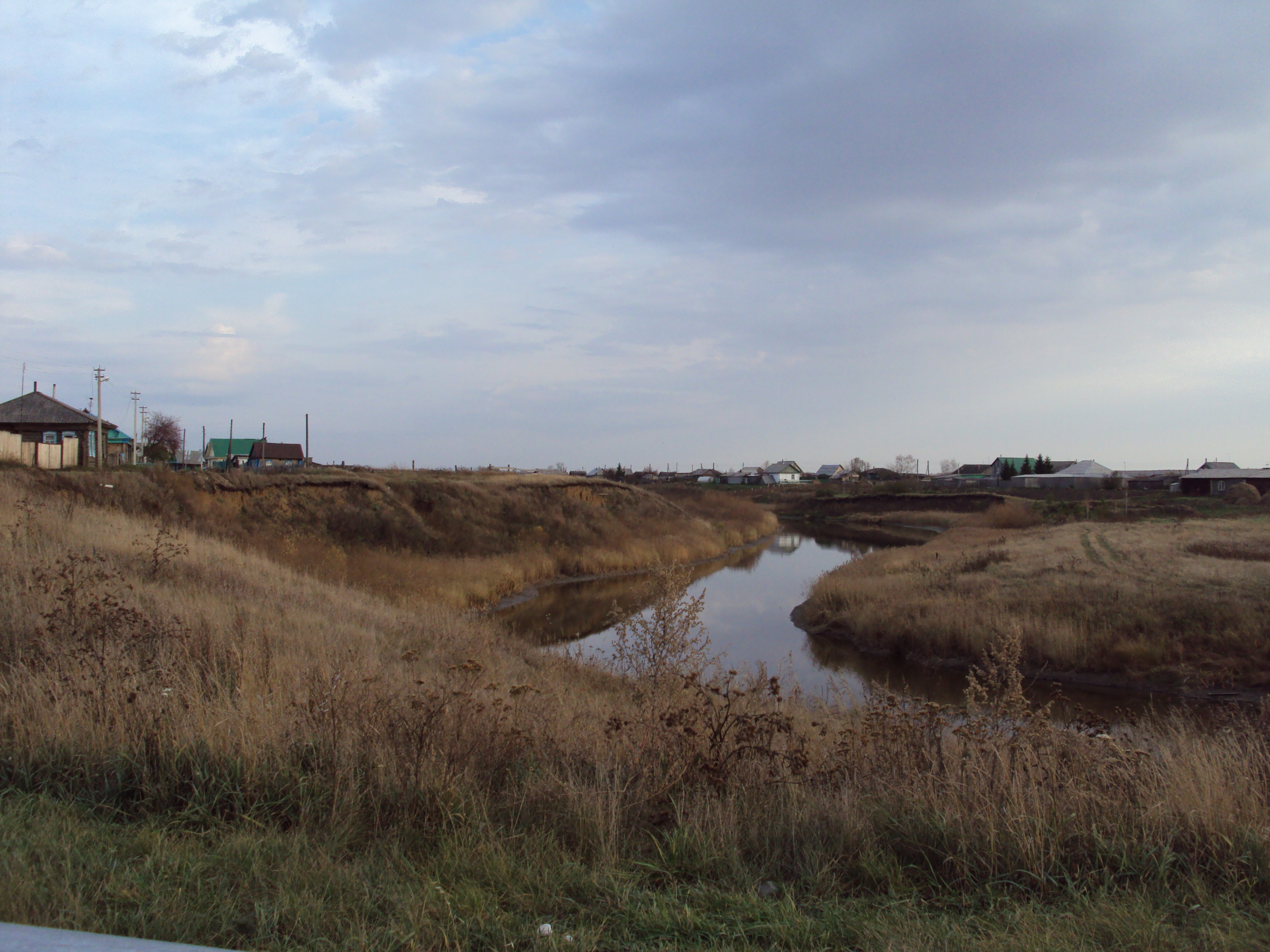
- View of the selo of Omutinskoye, the administrative center of Omutinsky District

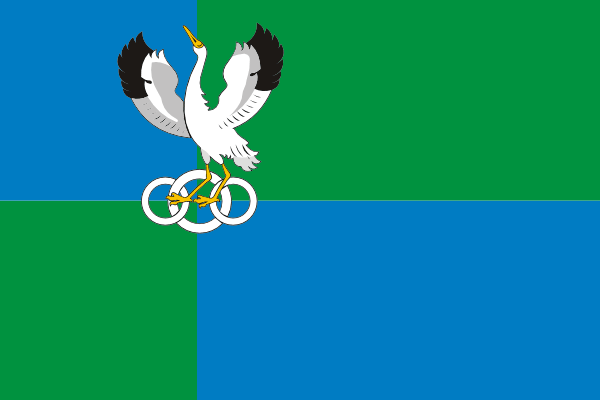
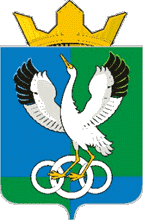
- Flag Coat of arms
- Location of Omutinsky District in Tyumen Oblast
- Coordinates: 56°12′44″N 67°58′29″E
- Country: Russia
- Federal subject: Tyumen Oblast
- Administrative center: Omutinskoye

Area
  - Total: 2,828 km^{2} (1,092 sq mi)

Population (2010 Census)
  - Total: 19,608
  - Density: 6.934/km^{2} (17.96/sq mi)
  - Urban: 0%
  - Rural: 100%

Administrative structure
  - Administrative divisions: 8 Rural okrugs
  - Inhabited localities: 37 rural localities

Municipal structure
  - Municipally incorporated as: Omutinsky Municipal District
  - Municipal divisions: 0 urban settlements, 8 rural settlements
- Time zone: UTC+5 (MSK+2)
- OKTMO ID: 71634000
- Website: http://omutinka.admtyumen.ru/

Omutinsky District (Russian: Омути́нский райо́н) is an administrative district (raion), one of the twenty-two in Tyumen Oblast, Russia. As a municipal division, it is incorporated as Omutinsky Municipal District. It is located in the south of the oblast. The area of the district is 2,828 square kilometers (1,092 sq mi). Its administrative center is the rural locality (a selo) of Omutinskoye. Population: 19,608 (2010 Census); 20,913 (2002 census); 24,279 (1989 Soviet census). The population of Omutinskoye accounts for 46.9% of the district's total population.
