= 4th State Duma =

Convocation of the lower house of Russian parliament

(Russia) State Duma of the Federal Assembly of the Russian Federation of the 4th convocation
| ← | 3rd State Duma | 5th State Duma | → |
- Seat composition of the 4th State Duma (as of 2007)

Overview
- Meeting place: State Duma Building; Moscow, Okhotny Ryad street, 1
- Term: 29 December 2003 – 24 December 2007
- Election: 7 December 2003
- Government: 23 committees
- Website: State Duma
- Members: 450
- Chairman: Boris Gryzlov (from United Russia)
- First Deputy: Lyubov Sliska (from United Russia); Alexander Zhukov (from United Russia)
- Deputy: List: Georgy Boos (from United Russia) Artur Chilingarov (from United Russia) Vyacheslav Volodin (from United Russia) Yuri Volkov (from United Russia) Vladimir Pekhtin (from United Russia) Oleg Morozov (from United Russia) Valentin Kuptsov (from Communist Party) Dmitry Rogozin (from Rodina) Vladimir Zhirinovsky (from Liberal Democratic Party)
- Party control: United Russia

The State Duma of the Federal Assembly of the Russian Federation of the 4th convocation (Russian: Государственная Дума Федерального Собрания Российской Федерации IV созыва) is a former convocation of the legislative branch of the State Duma, Lower House of the Russian Parliament. The 4th convocation met chiefly at the State Duma building in Moscow (however, several meetings took place at the Tauride Palace in St. Petersburg); it worked from December 7, 2003 to December 24, 2007.

The 4th State Duma's composition was based upon the results of the 2003 parliamentary election. Of the twenty–four parties participating in the elections, only four were able to overcome the 5% election threshold to gain representation based upon the proportional representation system and another party was held in the State Duma by winning a few electoral districts.

== Leadership ==
The first meeting of the State Duma traditionally held oldest deputy – 80 year-old of Valentin Varennikov.

On December 29, 2003, the parliament elected Boris Gryzlov as the Chairman of the State Duma.

First Deputy Chairman elected: Lyubov Sliska and Alexander Zhukov.

Deputy Chairman elected: Georgy Boos (before September 21, 2005), Yuri Volkov (since September 21, 2005), Artur Chilingarov, Vyacheslav Volodin, Vladimir Pekhtin, Oleg Morozov, Valentin Kuptsov, Dmitry Rogozin and Vladimir Zhirinovsky.

== Factions ==
| Faction | Leader | Seats |
|---|---|---|
| United Russia | Boris Gryzlov | 304 |
| Communist Party of the Russian Federation | Gennady Zuganov | 47 |
| A Just Russia – Rodina | Sergey Glazyev | 33 |
| Liberal Democratic Party of Russia | Igor Lebedev | 30 |
| Socialist Party of Russia – Patriots of Russia | Sergey Baburin | 8 |
| Independent deputies | | 23 |
| Vacant | | 5 |

== List of deputies ==
List of deputies

A Just Russia

- Anatoly Aksakov
- Alexander Babakov
- Ruben Badalov
- Valentin Varennikov
- Boris Vinogradov
- Viktor Gerashchenko
- Sergey Glazyev
- Anatoly Greshnevikov
- Sergey Grigoriev
- Gennady Gudkov
- Oleg Denisov
- Yelena Drapeko
- Ilya Yelizarov
- Valery Zubov
- Alexander Kuvaev
- Mikhail Markelov
- Oleg Mashchenko
- Igor Morozov
- Natalya Narochnitskaya
- Svyatoslav Nastashevsky
- Vladimir Nikitin
- Nikolai Pavlov
- Dmitry Rogozin
- Igor Rodionov
- Yevgeny Roizman
- Valentina Savostyanova
- Andrey Samoshin
- Yegor Solomatin
- Yuri Spiridonov
- Sergey Surovov
- Ivan Kharchenko
- Alexander Chuev
- Oleg Shein
- Vasily Shestakov
- Georgy Shpak

Communist Party of the Russian Federation

- Zhores Alferov
- Alevtina Aparina
- Nikolay Benediktov
- Viktor Vidmanov
- Ruslan Gostev
- Vladimir Grishukov
- Alexandr Davydov
- Nikolay Ezersky
- Ivan Zhdakaev
- Mikhail Zapolev
- Gennady Zyuganov
- Yuri Ivanov
- Svetlana Ivanova
- Viktor Ilyukhin
- Vladimir Kazakovtsev
- Vladimir Kashin
- Yuly Kvitsinsky
- Boris Kibirev
- Alexei Kondaurov
- Nikolai Kondratenko
- Alexandr Kravets
- Viлtor Kuznetsov
- Oleg Kulikov
- Valentin Kuptsov
- Anatoly Lokot
- Albert Makashov
- Yuri Maslyukov
- Mahmud Makhmudov
- Ivan Melnikov
- Sergey Muravlenko
- Vladimir Nikitin
- Nina Ostanina
- Viktor Pautov
- Tamara Pletnyova
- Valery Rashkin
- Sergey Reshulsky
- Valentin Romanov
- Pyotr Romanov
- Svetlana Savitskaya
- Nikolay Sapozhnikov
- Pyotr Svechnikov
- Vitaly Sevastyanov
- Valery Sergienko
- Oleg Smolin
- Sergei Sobko
- Viktor Tyulkin
- Nikolay Kharitonov
- Valentin Chikin
- Lyubov Shvets
- Sergey Shtogrin

United Russia

- Vladimir Averchenko
- Alexander Ageev
- Nadezhda Azarova
- Kurban-Ali Amirov
- Pavel Anokhin
- Sergey Antufyev
- Alexander Aristov
- Otari Arshba
- Vladimir Aseev
- Mukharbek Aushev
- Alexander Afanasiev
- Sergey Afendulov
- Nikolay Ashlapov
- Mansur Ayupov
- Mikhail Babich
- Anatoly Baboshkin
- Zaynulla Bagishaev
- Anton Bakov
- Margarita Barzhanova
- Yuri Barzykin
- Igor Barinov
- Arkady Baskaev
- Vitaly Basygysov
- Alexander Bezdolny
- Alexander Belousov
- Aleksandr Belyakov
- Andrey Benin
- Akhmed Bilalov
- Evgeny Blokhin
- Valentin Bobyrev
- Valery Bogomolov
- Evgeny Bogomolny
- Georgy Boos
- Olga Borzova
- Nikolay Bortsov
- Mikhail Bugera
- Nikolay Bulaev
- Alexandra Burataeva
- Andrey Burenin
- Natalia Burykina
- Vladimir Bykov
- Vadim Varshavsky
- Vladimir Vasilyev
- Vladimir Vasiliev
- Ivan Vasilyev
- Yury Vasilyev
- Victor Voitenko
- Alexey Volkov
- Yury Volkov
- Vasily Volkovsky
- Vyacheslav Volodin
- Sergey Vorobchukov
- Andrey Vorobyov
- Pavel Voronin
- Valery Vostrotin
- Ildar Gabdrakhmanov
- Magomed Gadzhiyev
- Farida Gaynullina
- Evgeny Galichanin
- Vasily Galushkin
- Valery Galchenko
- Magomedkadi Gasanov
- Nikolai Gerasimenko
- Ildar Gilmutdinov
- Rafael Gimalov
- Leonid Govorov
- Stanislav Govorukhin
- Georgy Golikov
- Nikolai Gonchar
- Vladimir Gorbachev
- Vladimir Goryunov
- Vladimir Grachev
- Valery Grebennikov
- Vladimir Grebenyuk
- Mikhail Grishankov
- Viktor Grishin
- Vladimir Gruzdev
- Boris Gryzlov
- Rinat Gubaidullin
- Anatoly Gubkin
- Alexey Guzanov
- Alexander Gurov
- Sait-Salam Gutseriev
- Kamilya Davletova
- Nikolay Demchuk
- Nikolay Denin
- Valentin Denisov
- Viktor Derenkovsky
- Igor Dines
- Galina Doroshenko
- Valery Draganov
- Valentin Drusinov
- Vladimir Dubovik
- Sergey Dubrovin
- Viktor Dubrovsky
- Valery Dyatlenko
- Stanislav Eliseikin
- Viktor Yeltsov
- Mikhail Yemelyanov
- Oleg Yeremeyev
- Dmitry Yeremin
- Vladimir Zhidkikh
- Sergey Zhitinkin
- Alexander Zhukov
- Andrey Zhukov
- Viktor Zavarzin
- Akhmar Zavgayev
- Nikolai Zalepukhin
- Mikhail Zalikhanov
- Konstantin Zatulin
- Evgeny Zayashnikov
- Boris Zubitsky
- Anatoly Ivanov
- Valentin Ivanov
- Valentina Ivanova
- Igor Igoshin
- Andrey Isayev
- Igor Isakov
- Alexander Ishchenko
- Boris Kazakov
- Viktor Kazakov
- Mars Kalmetyev
- Vener Kamaletdinov
- Pyotr Kamshilov
- Sergey Kapkov
- Aleksandr Karelin
- Vladimir Karetnikov
- Raisa Karmazina
- Anbyar Karmeev
- Vladimir Katalnikov
- Vladimir Katrenko
- Suleyman Kerimov
- Andrey Klimov
- Vladimir Klimov
- Frants Klintsevich
- Alexander Klyukin
- Viktor Klyus
- Andrey Knorr
- Joseph Kobzon
- Nikolay Kovalyov
- Oleg Kovalyov
- Alexander Koval
- Aleksandr Kogan
- Bashir Kodzoev
- Anatoly Kozeradsky
- Alexander Kozlovsky
- Andrey Kokoshin
- Viktor Kolesnikov
- Sergey Kolesnikov
- Natalya Komarova
- Valery Komissarov
- Yelena Kondakova
- Yury Konev
- Alexander Korzhakov
- Maxim Korobov
- Lev Korshunov
- Alexander Kosarikov
- Konstantin Kosachev
- Viktor Kosourov
- Valery Kravchenko
- Pavel Krasheninnikov
- Vladimir Krupchak
- Valery Kuzin
- Vasily Kuznetsov
- Gennady Kulik
- Anatoly Kulikov
- Georgy Lazarev
- Viktor Lazutkin
- Ekaterina Lakhova
- Alexander Lebedev
- Marina Lebedeva
- Georgy Leontiev
- Yury Lipatov
- Vladimir Litvinov
- Nikolay Litvinov
- Alexey Likhachev
- Yury Losskiy
- Valentin Luntsevich
- Marat Magdeev
- Andrey Makarov
- Nadezhda Maksimova
- Viktor Malashenko
- Valery Maleev
- Lyudmila Maltseva
- Valery Malchikhin
- Mamma Mammaev
- Vitaly Margelov
- Boris Martynov
- Gaji Makhachev
- Evgeny Medvedev
- Pavel Medvedev
- Yuri Medvedev
- Vladimir Medinsky
- Vladimir Mokry
- Alexander Morozov
- Oleg Morozov
- Alexander Moskalets
- Ivan Mosyakin
- Anvar Mukhametzakirov
- Zelimkhan Mutsoev
- Yuri Nazmeev
- Zaurbi Nakhushev
- Sergey Neverov
- Viktor Nefedov
- Asanbuba Nyudyurbegov
- Alexey Ogonkov
- Nikolay Olshansky
- Chylgychy Ondar
- Viktor Opekunov
- Alexander Orgolainen
- Sergey Osadchy
- Vera Oskina
- Bella Panina
- Yelena Panina
- Valery Panov
- Irina Panchenko
- Boris Pastukhov
- Vladimir Pekarev
- Sergey Pekpeev
- Liana Pepelyaeva
- Vladimir Pekhtin
- Valentina Pivnenko
- Lyudmila Pirozhnikova
- Viktor Pleskachevsky
- Vladimir Pligin
- Boris Plokhotnyuk
- Pavel Pozhigailo
- Sergey Popov
- Valery Prozorovsky
- Sergey Proschin
- Kirill Ragozin
- Gennady Raikov
- Boris Reznik
- Vladislav Reznik
- Yury Rodionov
- Alexander Rosenbaum
- Alexey Rozuvan
- Mikhail Rokitsky
- Pyotr Rubezhansky
- Igor Rudensky
- Lyubov Rudikova
- Valery Ryazansky
- Dmitry Sablin
- Ivan Savvidis
- Dmitry Savelyev
- Oleg Savchenko
- Franis Saifullin
- Albert Salikhov
- Alexander Sarychev
- Gadzhimet Safaraliev
- Olga Seliverstova
- Vladimir Semago
- Viktor Semenov
- Pavel Semenov
- Anatoly Semenchenko
- Vasily Semenkov
- Yury Sentyurin
- Dmitry Sivirkin
- Alexey Sigutkin
- Alexandr Sizov
- Leonid Simanovsky
- Viktor Sitnov
- Aleksandr Skorobogatko
- Andrei Skoch
- Lyubov Sliska
- Svetlana Smirnova
- Vladimir Smolensky
- Vladimir Stalmakhov
- Anatoly Starkov
- Zoya Stepanova
- Oleg Stolyarov
- Alexandr Strelnikov
- Sergey Strelchenko
- Shamil Sultanov
- Nikolay Sukhoy
- Alexandr Sysoev
- Nikolay Tabachkov
- Vladimir Tarachev
- Vasily Teterin
- Vyacheslav Timchenko
- Alexey Tkachov

Liberal Democratic Party of Russia

- Sergey Abeltsev
- Yelena Afanasyeva
- Lyubov Blizhina
- Andrey Bronitsyn
- Konstantin Vetrov
- Andrey Golovatyuk
- Dimitri Gusakov
- Ashot Egiazaryan
- Vladimir Zhirinovsky
- Yevgeni Ivanov
- Sergey Ivanov
- Arsen Kanokov
- Yury Kogan
- Aleksandr Kurdyumov
- Igor Lebedev
- Ivan Musatov
- Mikhail Musatov
- Vladimir Ovsyannikov
- Alexey Ostrovsky
- Andrey Polukhanov
- Maksim Rokhmistrov
- Valentin Sviridov
- Sergey Sirotkin
- Oleg Skorlukov
- Leonid Slutsky
- Vasily Tarasyuk
- Yevgeny Teplyakov
- Alexey Chernyshov
- Vladimir Churov
- Damir Shadaev
- Rifat Shaykhutdinov

Rodina

- Nikolay Bezborodov
- Sergey Glotov
- Alexander Krutov
- Nikolai Leonov
- Yelena Mukhina
- Andrey Savelyev
- Yury Savelyev
- Gennadiy Seleznyov
- Gennady Semigin
- Sergey Chaplinsky
- Viktor Cherepkov

Outside the factions

- Viktor Alksnis
- Sergey Baburin
- Ivan Viktorov
- Valery Gartung
- Svetlana Goryacheva
- Oksana Dmitriyeva
- Anatoly Yermolin
- Mikhail Zadornov
- Vladimir Zubalev
- Evgeny Zyablitsev
- Leonid Ivanchenko
- Nikolai Kuryanovich
- Oleg Malyshkin
- Aleksey Mitrofanov
- Alexander Nevzorov
- Vladimir Plotnikov
- Sergey Popov
- Viktor Pokhmelkin
- Vladimir Ryzhkov
- Irina Savelyeva
- Alexandr Fomenko
- Galina Khovanskaya

== Major legislation ==
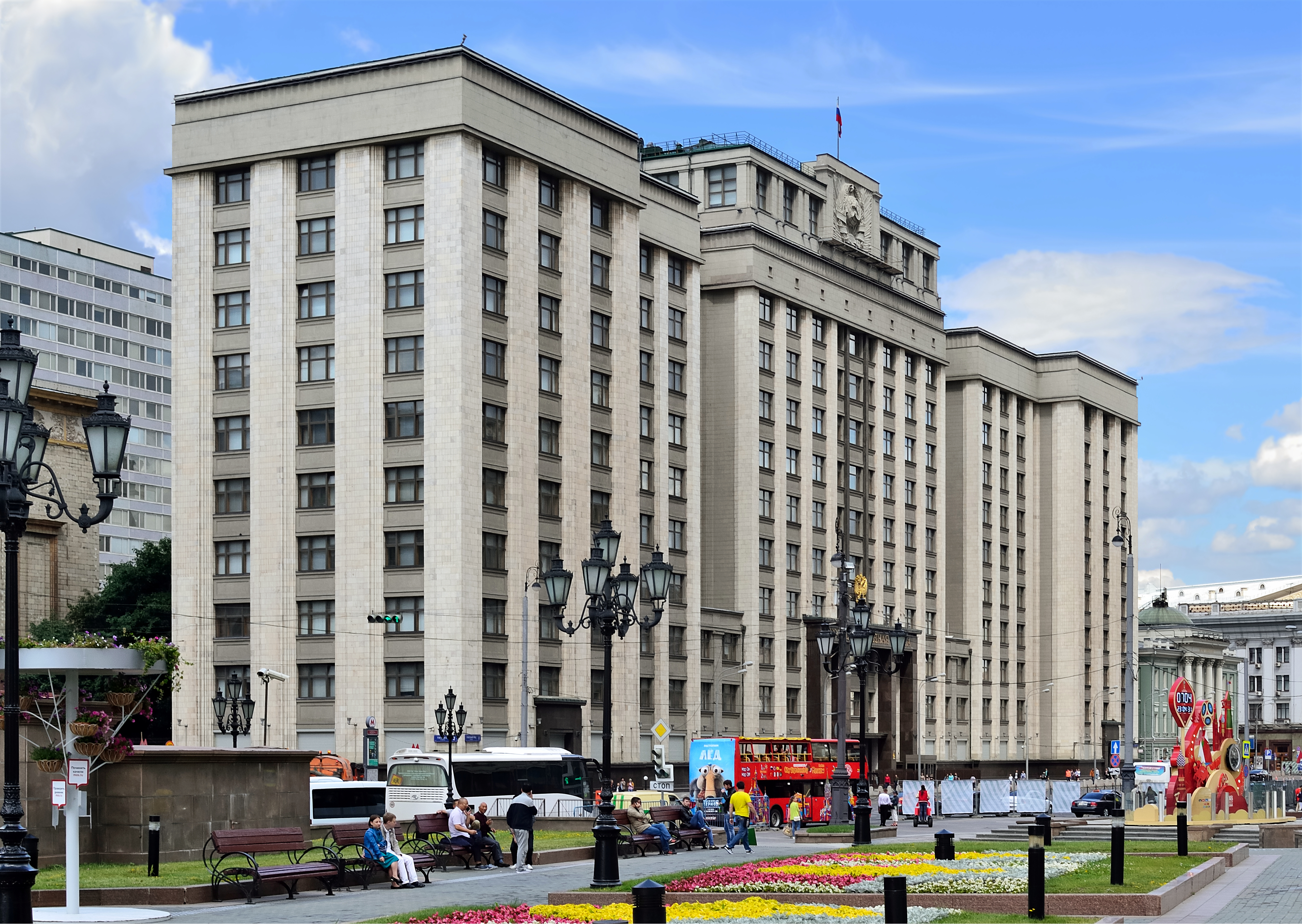
- Modern building of the State Duma
  March 5, 2004: Mikhail Fradkov approved as Prime Minister of Russia with 352 votes in favor.
- May 12, 2004: Mikhail Fradkov re-approved as Prime Minister of Russia with 356 votes in favor.
- December 3, 2004: A law on the abolition of the direct election of regional heads with 358 votes in favor.
- September 14, 2007: Viktor Zubkov approved as Prime Minister of Russia with 381 votes in favor.

== Committees ==
In the State Duma of the 4th convocation operated 28 Committees.

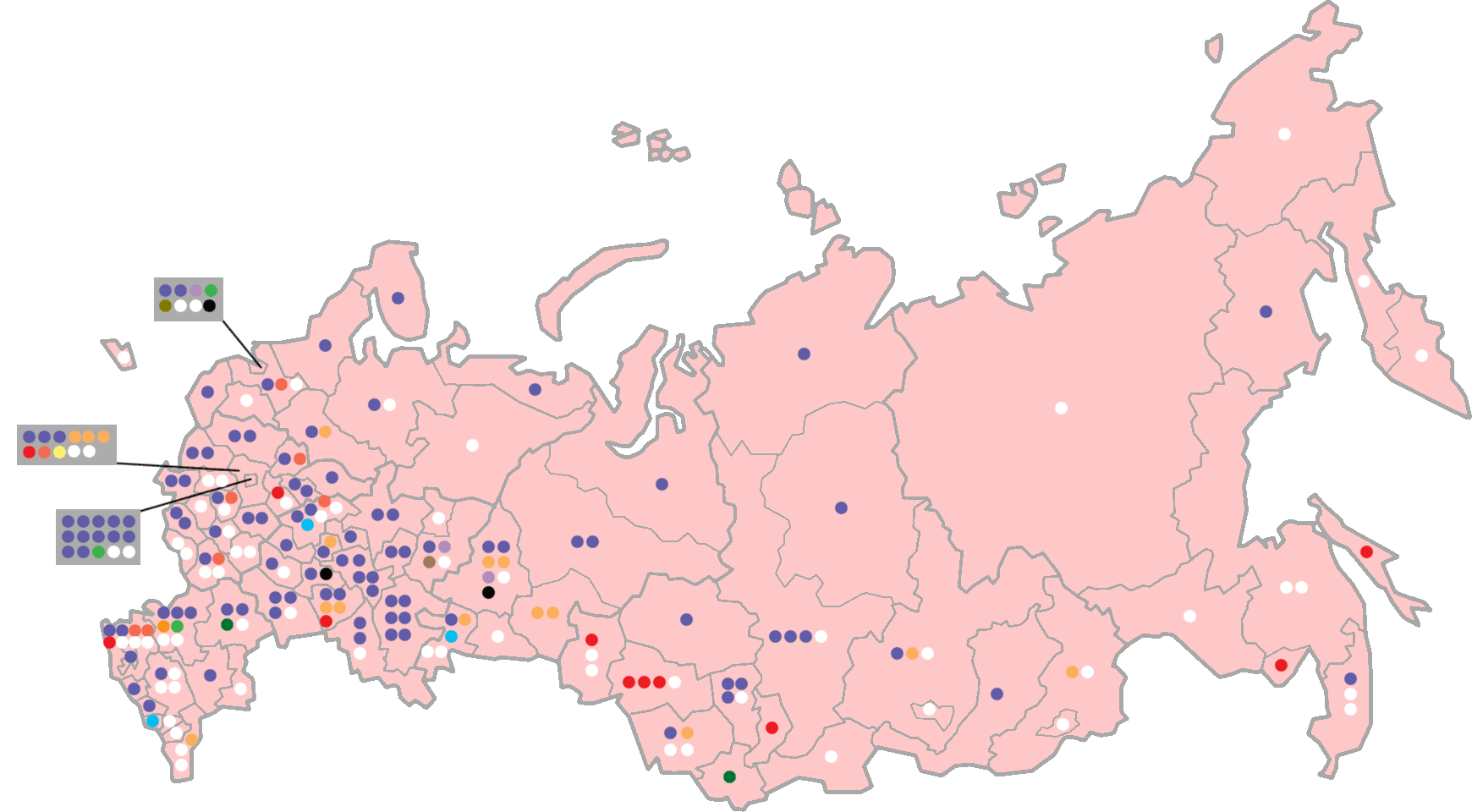
Distribution of the constituency seats by federal subject. List: United Russia People's Party Communist Party Rodina Yabloko Party of Rebirth/Party of Life Union of Rightist Forces Agrarian Party Great Russia New Deal Business Development Party Self-nominations Seat not filled

- Committee on Constitutional Legislation and State Building
- Committee on Civil, Criminal, Arbitration and Procedural Law
- Veterans Affairs Committee
- Committee of Labour and Social Policy
- Budget and Tax Committee
- Committee on Credit Organizations and Financial Markets
- Committee on Economic Policy, Entrepreneurship and Tourism
- Committee on Property Issues
- Information Policy Committee
- Committee on Energy, Transport and Communications
- Committee on Industry, Construction and High Technology
- Education and Science Committee
- Committee on Culture
- Committee on Physical Culture, Sport and Youth Affairs
- Health Protection Committee
- Committee on Women, Family and Children
- Committee on Agrarian Issues
- Defence Committee
- Safety Committee
- Committee on International Affairs
- Committee on Commonwealth of Independent States Affairs and Relations with Compatriots
- Committee on Rules and Organization of the State Duma
- Committee on the problems of the North and Far East
- Committee on Federation Affairs and Regional Policy
- Committee on Local Government
- The Environmental Committee
- Committee on Natural Resources and the Environment
- Committee on Public Associations and Religious Organizations
- Committee for Nationalities
