= Musatov =

Musatov (Russian: Мусатов) is a Russian masculine surname, its feminine counterpart is Musatova. It may refer to

- Aleksei Musatov (1980–2005), Russian football player
- Igor Musatov (born 1987), Russian ice hockey winger
- Ivan Musatov (born 1976), Russian politician, son of Mikhail
- Mikhail Musatov (1950–2022), Russian politician, father of Ivan
- Victor Borisov-Musatov (1870–1905), Russian painter
