= Gusakov =

Gusakov (Russian: Гусако́в), female form Gusakova (Russian: Гусако́ва), is a Russian surname originating from the word Гусь, meaning goose.

== Notable people ==
Notable people having this surname include:

- Boris Gusakov, Soviet serial killer (1938–1970)
- Dimitri Gusakov (born 1971), Russian politician
- Maria Gusakova (1931–2022), Soviet skier
- Nikolay Gusakov (1934–1993), Soviet skier
- Yuri Gusakov (born 1969), Russian footballer
