= Andrey Svintsov =

Russian politician

Andrey Svintsov MP
- Андрей Свинцов
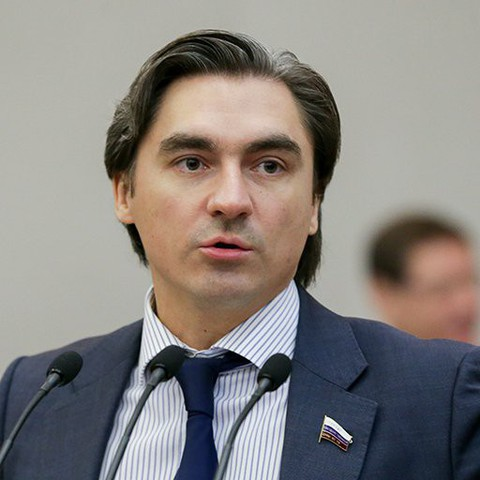
- Svintsov in 2020

Member of the State Duma (Party List Seat)
- Incumbent
- Assumed office 8 June 2022
- Preceded by: Vladimir Zhirinovsky
- In office 21 December 2011 – 12 October 2021

Personal details
- Born: 12 November 1978 (age 47) Moscow, Russian SFSR, Soviet Union
- Party: LDPR (expelled in 2026)
- Education: Moscow State University of Environmental Engineering

Andrey Nikolayevich Svintsov (Russian: Андрей Николаевич Свинцов; born 12 November 1978) is a Russian politician who served as a deputy of the 6th, 7th and 8th State Dumas.

While studying at the Moscow State University of Environmental Engineering, Svitsov was a specialist of the first category, a leading specialist in the central hydrochemical laboratory. In 2000, he started working as a junior researcher at the State Center for Water Management Monitoring of the Ministry of Natural Resources and Environment. The same year, Svintsov joined the Liberal Democratic Party of Russia (LDPR). From 2004 to 2008, he was an advisor to the first deputy head of the LDPR faction in the 4th State Duma Maksim Rokhmistrov. In 2008, Svintsov became the assistant to the deputy chairman of the 5th State Duma Vladimir Zhirinovsky. In 2011 and 2016, he was elected deputy of the 6th and 7th State Dumas, respectively. In 2021, he was not elected to the 8th Duma according to the results of the elections. However, after Zhirinovsky's death in April 2022, Svintsov received his vacant Duma mandate on 1 June 2022, and took up his seat in the 8th convocation the next week on 8 June.

== Legislative Initiatives and Public Statements ==
In 2015, Deputy Andrey Svintsov stated that Turkish-made candies were being sold in the State Duma cafeteria. He expressed his intention to seek a ban on the sale of Turkish sweets and to have them inspected for compliance with sanitary regulations. According to the deputy, any cooperation with Turkish businesses should be considered as financing terrorism. Svintsov also claimed he had received a constituent complaint alleging stomach pain after consuming Turkish candies. He further speculated that the candies might contain palm oil, which he alleged could lead to cancer and other diseases.

In 2023, Svintsov declared that celebrities who had left Russia following the start of the special military operation (SMO) should be "whipped with a lash on Red Square" and made to "beg for forgiveness on their knees from all Russian citizens and the President of Russia." He proposed prosecuting those who did not support the SMO, and obligating those who had not stated their position to pay a 95% tax.

In October 2024, Svintsov proposed banning the propaganda of "quadrobiking." He also stated that "the bill equating the promotion of quadrobiking to LGBT propaganda" was justified.

At the end of 2024, Svintsov submitted a draft law to the State Duma proposing that alcohol could only be sold to adults who present a certificate from a narcologist. Under the proposed legislation, every Russian citizen would need to visit a narcologist for a consultation on the dangers of alcohol and a medical examination, after which the doctor could issue (or deny) permission to purchase alcoholic beverages. Svintsov suggested that this permission be verified through the Gosuslugi public services portal, where each adult citizen would need to have a registered clearance from a narcologist to be shown at the point of sale.

On 18 March 2026, Svintsov was expelled from his party due to him discussing the blocking of Telegram in Russia.

== Sanctions ==
In December 2022, the EU sanctioned Andrey Svintsov in relation to the 2022 Russian invasion of Ukraine.
