= Letter of 5000 =

2005 Russian petition

The Letter of 5000 (Russian: Письмо́ 5000), also known as the Letter of 500 or the Letter of the 19 Deputies (Russian: Письмо 19 депутатов), was an open letter published on 21 March 2005 and signed by 5,000 Russians, most significantly politicians, addressed to the Prosecutor-General of Russia. In response to an increasing number of prosecutions of Russian nationalists on charges of antisemitism, the letter sharply criticized several Jews, Jewish leaders, and Jewish organisations in Russia, and called for the investigation of the Jewish religious manual Kitzur Shulchan Aruch as itself a criminal incitement to ethnic hatred of non-Jews.

The letter, published on 21 March 2005, attracted significant discussion in Russian and international media due to its demands, which were widely considered to be antisemitic.

== History and content ==
On 15 December 2004, Russian writer and monarchist Mikhail Nazarov published an article on the website russia-talk.com, titled "Appeal to the Prosecutor General of the Russian Federation V. V. Ustinov in connection with the increased application of Article 282 of the Criminal Code of the Russian Federation on 'inciting ethnic hatred' towards Jews". In the article, Nazarov complained of the recent prosecution of Russian nationalists under hate-speech laws, saying that the prosecutor's office had the duty of finding the source of the "Russo-Jewish conflict", and that the Russian nationalists accused of antisemitism were simply defending themselves from the "aggressive Jewish morality" found in the Kitzur Shulchan Aruch, a popular manual of devotion among Orthodox Jews.

The article used examples from the abridged version published by the Congress of the Jewish Religious Organizations and Associations in Russia, which states that the moral code of the Kitzur Shulchan Aruch should still be followed in the modern day. The article issued an appeal to the Prosecutor-General's office to "check the outrageous facts outlined above, and, if confirmed, to begin a case on the prohibition of all Jewish national and religious organisations as extremists." The article was written in response to an increasing number of cases initiated against Russian nationalists on charges of antisemitism.

On 13 January 2005, the first version of the letter, then with 500 signatories, was submitted to the Prosecutor-General's office by 20 of the State Duma deputies who had signed it. Fourteen of the deputies were from the Rodina party (Note: Sergei Glotov, Anatoly Greshnevikov, Sergei Grigoriev, Alexander Krutov, Nikolai Leonov, Oleg Mashchenko, Vladimir Nikitin, Nikolai Pavlov, Igor Rodionov, Andrey Savelyev, Yuri Savelyev, Irina Savelyeva, Ivan Kharchenko, and Alexander Chuyev.), and six from the Communist Party of the Russian Federation (Note: Nikolai Yezersky, Vladimir Kashin, Nikolai Kondratenko, Albert Makashov, Peter Svechnikov, and Sergei Sobko.). Following the publication of the letter on 24 January, there was backlash both within the Duma and from the Russian public, and the majority of deputies eventually withdrew their signatures. Several signatories would later claim that they did not agree with the letter, or that their signature was forged.

Following the publication of the letter, Nazarov turned to the people of Russia to sign the letter, profiting off of the attention and eventually reaching roughly 5,000 signatures by the time the letter was submitted to the Prosecutor-General's office a second time, on 21 March 2005, coinciding with the Feast of Orthodoxy. In the letter, it was claimed that there was a "masked genocide" against the Russian people and accused Russian Jews of blood libel, but the proposal changed; it was no longer a request to ban all Jewish organisations, but instead only ones which followed the Kitzur Shulchan Aruch.

== Reaction ==
The reaction, both in Russia and abroad, was overwhelmingly critical of the letter. The Russian Ministry of Foreign Affairs, as well as the Israeli Ministry of Foreign Affairs and the Israeli embassy in Russia, condemned the letter, as well as antisemitism in Russia. Both Russian, such as NEWSru and Gazeta.Ru, and international news sites, such as the BBC and The Daily Telegraph, criticised the letter. Multiple figures from across the political spectrum, such as Dmitry Rogozin of Rodina, Gennady Zyuganov of the CPRF (himself accused of antisemitism), and Geydar Dzhemal of The Other Russia, also condemned it as antisemitic. Russian President Vladimir Putin, in an interview with the Israeli Channel 1, condemned antisemitism and stated that Judaism was one of the "traditional religions" of Russia.

Following the widespread condemnation of the petition, the Prosecutor-General's office announced it would investigate the authors for antisemitism, but the investigation did not find criminal conduct. In response, the Russian public movement "For Human Rights" unsuccessfully sued the office of the Prosecutor-General.

== Aftermath ==
Following the refusal of the Prosecutor-General to investigate Kitzur Shulchan Aruch, Nazarov claimed that he had received 10,000 new signatures for the letter, supporting an investigation and banning of organisations which followed it. Nazarov outlined a non-reciprocal set of "reciprocal" demands for Jewish organizations to accept all of the 5000's claims as true and make amends for them; the demands were ignored and Nazarov later complained that the Russian courts refused his demands to restart investigations and agree with all of his suggestions. Some signatories, dissatisfied with the result, also formed the organisation "Live Without Fear of a Jew!", claiming that the reason the original appeal was not accepted was due to the Prosecutor-General's fear of a Jewish response. However, the organisation quickly ceased to be active.
