= Yelizarov =

Yelizarov or Elizarov (Russian: Елизаров) is a Russian masculine surname deriving from the name Eleazar, its feminine counterpart is Yelizarova or Elizarova. It may refer to:

- Aleksandr Elizarov (born 1952), Soviet biathlete
- Darya Elizarova (born 1991), Russian-born Uzbekistani gymnast
- Ilya Yelizarov (born 1963), member of the State Duma of Russia
- Jennifer Elizarov (born 2003), Canadian pole vaulter
- Katia Elizarova (born 1986), Russian model and actress
- Prokopy Yelizarov, Russian statesman of 17th century, the voivod of Solikamsk province during the rule of Alexis I

== See also ==
- Yelizarov Monastery, small convent founded in 1447 to the north of Pskov by a local peasant named Eleazar
