= Viktor Ilyukhin =

Russian politician (1949–2011)

Viktor Ilyukhin Виктор Илюхин
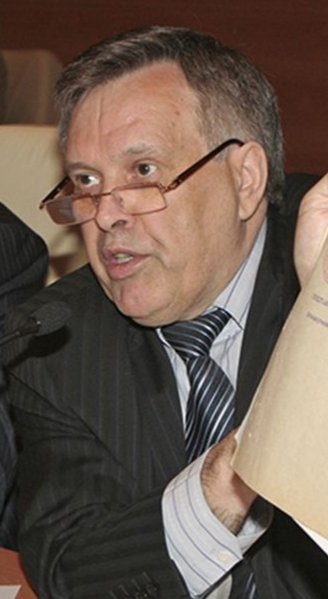

Chairman of the State Duma Committee on Security
- In office 1994–2000
- Preceded by: Office established
- Succeeded by: Alexander Gurov

Member of the State Duma
- In office 12 December 1993 – 19 March 2011
- Constituency: Pervomaisk (No. 136)

Personal details
- Born: Viktor Ivanovich Ilyukhin; 1 March 1949 Sosnovka, Penza Oblast, Russian SFSR, Soviet Union
- Died: 19 March 2011 (aged 62) Kratovo, Moscow Oblast, Russia
- Resting place: Troyekurovskoye Cemetery
- Party: Movement in Support of the Army; Communist Party of the Russian Federation; Communist Party of the Soviet Union (1978–1991)
- Spouse: Nadezhda Ilyukhina
- Children: Yekaterina (1979–2006); Vladimir
- Education: Saratov Law Institute DI Kursk

Viktor Ivanovich Ilyukhin (Russian: Ви́ктор Ива́нович Илю́хин; 1 March 1949, Sosnovka, Penza Oblast – 19 March 2011, Kratovo, Moscow Oblast) was a Russian State Duma deputy, member of the Communist Party of the Russian Federation, Chairman of the State Duma Committee on security, member of the State Duma's anti-corruption committee, member of the State Duma committee to consider of the federal budget on the defense and security of the Russian Federation, and Chairman of the Movement in Support of the Army.

Ilyukhin was a sharp critic of the Soviet and Russian authorities since perestroika. Over the years, he brought charges of high treason against Soviet President Mikhail Gorbachev and two Russian Presidents, Boris Yeltsin and Vladimir Putin.

== Early life ==
Viktor Ivanovich Ilyukhin was born on 1 March 1949 in Sosnovka, a small village in the Kuznetsky District, Penza Oblast of the Soviet Union. He was the eleventh son in a patriarchal family of Ivan Ionovich Ilyukhin (born in 1905) and his wife Ilyukhina Yekaterina Alekseyevna (died in 1977).

In 1966, Ilyukhin worked for a year as a warehouse worker in a logging company of the town of Kuznetsk, studying in parallel to be a legal scholar at the Saratov Law Institute DI Kursk on extramural basis. Later on, he was transferred to full-time and successfully graduated in 1971. He had carried out his one-year compulsory military service, serving on a submarine depot ship of the Pacific Fleet at the Chazhma Bay near the village of Dunay, Primorsky Krai.

== Legal career ==
Ilyukhin began as investigator in the Penza Regional Department of Internal Affairs, continuing his career after the navy in December 1972. He became a member of the CPSU in 1978.

In 1984, he worked his way up to Deputy Prosecutor of Penza Oblast, occupying the position until August 1986, when he was promoted to Deputy Chief of the Main Investigations Directorate in the USSR Prosecutor General's Office. Ilyukhin led a taskforce to clarify the actual state of crime control on his first duty journey in Bashkiria, subsequently he investigated episodes of extremism in Uzbekistan, Azerbaijan, Transnistria and the Baltic republics.

In August 1989, Ilyukhin became, on the recommendation of the then USSR Prosecutor General Aleksandr Sukharev, head of the department for supervision over the implementation of laws on national security, a member of Prosecutor's Office and Senior Assistant of Procurator General of the Soviet Union.

On 4 November 1991, Ilyukhin filed charges of high treason against Soviet President Mikhail Gorbachev under the article No.64 of the RSFSR Criminal Code in connection with the signing of the USSR State Council regulations concerning the recognition of the independence of Lithuania, Latvia and Estonia on 6 September 1991. As a result of the adoption of these regulations, the law of 3 April 1990, "On the Procedure for Deciding Questions Connected with the Secession of a Union Republic from the USSR", has been violated, because the Baltic republics have not held referendums on secession from the USSR. However, the Prosecutor General of the USSR Nikolai Trubin closed the case due to the fact that the decision to recognize the independence of the Baltic states was not personally made by the President, but by the State Council. Two days later, Ilyukhin was dismissed from the USSR Prosecutor's Office.

After leaving the office, he began to work as a columnist for the newspaper Pravda, where he was the head of its legal department.

== Political career ==
On 12 December 1993, he was elected to the State Duma of the first convocation for the single-mandate constituency No.136 in Penza Oblast, receiving 27,4% of the vote. In the same year, he led a public commission investigating Gorbachev's "anti-constitutional activities". In January 1994, he was elected Chairman of the State Duma Committee on security.

On 11 April 1995, he entered the National Council of the Congress of Russian Communities, whose then chairman was Yuri Skokov. In December 1995, he was re-elected as a candidate of the CPRF to the State Duma of the second convocation from the single-mandate constituency No.136 in Penza Oblast, receiving 56,58% of the vote, and entered the CPRF faction. On 30 January 1996, he was re-elected Chairman of the State Duma Committee on Security.

In 1998, he became Chairman of the Movement in Support of the Army after the murder of Lev Rokhlin, which had 76 regional offices and had united hundreds of thousands of people. On 15 December 1998, Ilyukhin accused Jewish members of the government, appointed by President Boris Yeltsin, of waging genocide against the Russian people because their economic policies had led to increased mortality and a fall in the population of 8 million.

On 15 May 1999, Ilyukhin launched an impeachment procedure against President Boris Yeltsin, accusing him of the genocide of the Russian people in his speech at the State Duma hearings. The impeachment attempt, however, fell 17 votes short of required 300 to initiate the process of impeachment of the president.

On 12 December 1999 Ilyukhin survived an assassination attempt by an unknown gunman at his front door in Moscow.

In 2001, he accused Ukraine of supplying arms to Chechnya and Afghanistan, prompting an objection from Kiev, which called Ilyukhin's words "provocative".

He was a candidate in the gubernatorial election conducted in Penza Oblast on 14 April 2002, but came in second place, receiving 40.95% of the vote against 45.45% for the incumbent, Vasily Bochkaryov.

== Death ==
Ilyukhin died on the evening of 19 March 2011 in his country house in Kratovo, waiting an ambulance. The Russian Communist Party was concerned why it took the ambulance so long to arrive, and announced an independent investigation since Ilyukhin appeared healthy and never complained of heart problems before his sudden death.

Viktor Ilyukhin was buried at the Troyekurovskoye Cemetery on March 22, 2011.

== Memorials ==
On 24 March 2012, was held the opening ceremony of a commemorative plaque to Victor Ilyukhin on the house No. 160 in Suvorov Street of Penza, where he lived with his family. The plaque was made in Ukraine and installed by the CPRF communists, which was unveiled by his sister, Galina Manturova, and his colleague, Viktor Zhuravlyov.

== See also ==
- List of members of the State Duma of Russia who died in office
