= Alexander Gurov =

Alexander Gurov may refer to:

- Alexander Gurov (politician) (born 1945), Russian politician
- Alexander Gurov (boxer) (born 1971), Ukrainian boxer
