= Active reserve =

Active reserve may refer to:

- United States Army Reserve
- Active Reserve (Czech Army)
- Active reserve (KGB)
