= Movement in Support of the Army =

Russian radical political movement

Movement in Support of the Army Движение в поддержку армии
- Abbreviation: DPA
- Leader: Viktor Sobolev
- Founder: Lev Rokhlin
- Founded: 8 July 1997
- Registered: 5 March 1998
- Split from: Our Home – Russia
- Headquarters: Moscow
- Newspaper: DPA Combat Leaflet (1998–2008)
- Ideology: Stratocracy; Militarism; Russian nationalism Soviet patriotism Antisemitism (1998–2000s)
- Political position: Syncretic
- National affiliation: Communist Party of the Russian Federation (since 2011); National Patriotic Forces of Russia
- Colours: Red
- Slogan: "Let's save our Fatherland!" (Russian: "Выручим отечество!")
- State Duma: 1 / 450

Party flag

Website
- Odnoklassniki page

The Movement in Support of the Army, Defense Industry and Military Science (Russian: Движение «В поддержку армии, оборонной промышленности и военной науки»), or simply Movement in Support of the Army (Russian: Движение в поддержку армии, romanized: Dvizheniye v podderzhku armii, DPA) is a Russian pro-military nationalist political movement established in 1997 by the lieutenant general and State Duma member Lev Rokhlin. Rokhlin, who had been radically opposed to Boris Yeltsin's government, was killed under unclear circumstances in July 1998 amid rumors that he was preparing a military coup against Yeltsin.

After Rokhlin's murder in July 1998, the movement took a more radical nationalist and antisemitic stance under the leadership of generals Viktor Ilyukhin and Albert Makashov, but after its defeat in the 1999 legislative election, DPA went into decline and by the end of the 2010s had become a full satellite of the Communist Party of the Russian Federation.

== History ==
=== Foundation and Rokhlin leadership ===
The first meeting of the organizing committee of the Movement in Support of the Army took place on 9 July 1997. About 300 delegates participated in the meeting under the leadership of Lev Rokhlin. The meeting was also attended by former Russian Defense Minister Igor Rodionov, former KGB heads Vladimir Kryuchkov and Leonid Shebarshin, State Duma deputies Valentin Varennikov, Viktor Ilyukhin, Albert Makashov, former Soviet Airborne Forces commander Vladislav Achalov, former Black Sea Fleet commander Eduard Baltin, chairman of the Russian Union of Veterans of the Armed Forces Grigory Yashkin, chairman of the "Union of Officers" movement Stanislav Terekhov, Don Cossacks ataman Nikolai Kozitsyn and chairman of the All-Russian Movement "Stalin" Omar Begov. About 30 major veterans' and officer organizations have announced their support for the creation of the DPA. From August 1997 to 1998, the "Honor and Motherland" movement of Alexander Lebed was also affiliated with the Rokhlin's Movement.

On 11 September 1997, Lev Rokhlin left the Our Home – Russia State Duma faction, and on 20 September, the founding congress of the DPA took place, which was attended by many Russian national patriotic political figures, such as Gennady Zyuganov, Sergey Baburin, Vladimir Zhirinovsky, Viktor Anpilov, Alexander Korzhakov, Sergey Glazyev. In his speech at the congress, DPA chairman Rokhlin called on Boris Yeltsin to immediately resign from his presidential powers, and declared that Yeltsin's removal from power, the creation of a transitional coalition government and the coming to power of a new president, a "patriot of his homeland," through snap election, as the key goals of the movement. This radical anti-Yeltsin position was confirmed at the second congress of the DPA on 25 December 1997, at which more moderate officers such as Igor Rodionov and Alexander Lebed left the movement, and the radical and pro-CPRF faction became dominant.

The movement was registered by the Ministry of Justice as a political public association on 5 March 1998.

On the night of 2–3 July 1998, Lev Rokhlin was killed under unclear circumstances. According to the official version, Rokhlin was killed by his wife Tamara, who was later sentenced to prison. However, Tamara Rokhlina denied her involvement, insisting that he was killed by a group of masked men who broke into their dacha. According to Lev Rokhlin's daughter Elena, his father "was removed because he had the opportunity to carry out a military coup."

=== Ilyukhin–Makashov leadership ===
On 8 July 1998, the third (extraordinary) congress of the movement was held. Viktor Ilyukhin was elected as the Chairman of the DPA, and Albert Makashov, Nikolai Kozitsyn and Igor Bratishchev were elected as the first deputy chairmen. Under the leadership of Viktor Ilyukhin's DPA, the All-Russian Headquarters for the Coordination and Organization of the Protest Movement in Russia was created in July 1998.

In the spring of 1999, the DPA began forming its own electoral bloc to participate in the legislative election. On 20 April 1999, Viktor Ilyukhin announced that the Russian Party of Vladimir Miloserdov, the Soyuz movement of Georgy Tikhonov, and the Geydar Dzhemal's Islamic Committee of Russia had expressed a desire to join the DPA-led electoral bloc. The DPA abandoned the idea of creating joint blocs with the CPRF and the ROS, but in September 1999 they signed a declaration on cooperation of the national patriotic forces in the election campaign. The leaders of the DPA list in the 1999 election were Viktor Ilyukhin, Albert Makashov and the rector of the Baltic State Technical University, Yuri Savelyev.

In the 1999 Russian legislative election, the Movement in Support of the Army received 0.59% of the votes on party lists, failing to pass the 5% threshold for the proportional constituency. Two members of the DPA, Viktor Ilyukhin and Georgy Kostin, were elected in single-mandate constituencies.

According to the SOVA Center, after the 1999 legislative election, the movement usually does not act independently, but joins the CPRF political actions. Throughout the 2000s and 2010s, the DPA gradually became less active. In 2001, with the adoption of a new law on political parties, the Movement in Support of the Army decided not to register as a party, remaining a public association.

On 17 June 2000, Albert Makashov was expelled from the DPA leadership.

In December 2003, the movement's leader Viktor Ilyukhin was elected to the State Duma for the fourth time. He was deputy chairman of the State Duma Committee on Security.

In 2005, the movement took part in a rally where its representatives declared that the army's money, with the help of "certain officials," was flowing to "overseas and domestic magnates of one well-known nationality" and called for a fight to complete victory "against these Satanists of the 21st century."

DPA leader Ilyukhin died on the evening of 19 March 2011 in his dacha in Kratovo, waiting an ambulance. The CPRF was concerned why it took the ambulance so long to arrive, and announced an independent investigation since Ilyukhin appeared healthy and never complained of heart problems before his sudden death.

=== Komoedov and Sobolev leadership ===
On 9 July 2011, former Black Sea Fleet commander Vladimir Komoedov, a CPRF member, was elected Chairman of the DPA. Under Komoyedov's leadership, the DPA finally came under the complete control of the CPRF. The movement declared its support for the presidential candidacy of Gennady Zyuganov in the 2012 presidential election. At the same time, the movement split with the Rokhlin family, which members decided to support radical nationalists like Vladimir Kvachkov.

On 25 October 2014, retired Lieutenant General and also a member of the CPRF, Viktor Sobolev was elected Chairman of the DPA. In September 2021 Sobolev was elected deputy of the 8th State Duma on CPRF list.

== Ideology ==
Under the leadership of Lev Rokhlin, the DPA was considered a radical pro-communist "great imperial nationalist" organization, while at the same time avoiding ethnic nationalism and xenophobia. The DPA advocated the abolition of the position of president, the creation of a parliamentary republic with a strong government accountable to parliament. In the economic sphere, the DPA advocates the nationalization of the fuel and energy and military-industrial complex, de-privatization, strengthening of the state sector and its financing through state own banks, with the permission of private property "in a number of sectors of the national economy."

During the leadership of Viktor Ilyukhin (1998–2011) and Albert Makashov (1998–2000), the DPA acquired a specifically anti-Semitic character. In the fall of 1998, Albert Makashov made several aggressive antisemitic statements, and in February 1999 he demonstratively proposed changing the name of the DPA to DPZh ("Movement Against the Zhids"). As one commentator noted, "By December 1999, the DPA was little more than a mouthpiece for its two leaders' rabid anti-Semitism and it scored close to nil in the elections."

After Ilyukhin's death, the DPA became a satellite pro-army movement of the Communist Party of the Russian Federation, coordinating all its actions with the party.

== Leadership ==
Albert Makashov in 1998-2000 was considered an unofficial co-leader of the DPA, legally being the deputy chairman.

№	Dates	Chairman	Ref
1	20 September 1997 – 3 July 1998†	Lev Rokhlin	
2	8 July 1998 – 19 March 2011†	Viktor Ilyukhin	
3	9 July 2011 – 25 October 2014	Vladimir Komoedov	
4	25 October 2014 –	Viktor Sobolev	

== Electoral results ==
=== State Duma ===
Election	Leader	Votes	%	Seats	+/–	Government
1999	Viktor Ilyukhin	384,404	0.59 (#15)	2 / 450	–	Opposition
2003	Viktor Ilyukhin	Participated inside CPRF		1 / 450	▼1	Opposition
2007	Viktor Ilyukhin	Participated inside CPRF		2 / 450	▲1	Opposition
2011	Vladimir Komoedov	Participated inside CPRF		1 / 450	▼1	Opposition
2016	Viktor Sobolev	Participated inside CPRF		0 / 450	▼1	Extra-parliamentary
2011	Viktor Sobolev	Participated inside CPRF		1 / 450	▲1	Opposition
