= Unbelievable Adventures of Italians in Russia =

1974 Soviet-Italian comedy film

- Directed by: Eldar Ryazanov; Franco Prosperi
- Written by: Emil Braginsky; Franco Castellano; Giuseppe Moccia; Eldar Ryazanov
- Produced by: Dino De Laurentiis; Luigi De Laurentiis
- Starring: Andrei Mironov; Ninetto Davoli; Antonia Santilli; Alighiero Noschese; Tano Cimarosa; Yevgeniy Yevstigneyev; Olga Aroseva
- Cinematography: Mikhail Bitz; Gábor Pogány
- Edited by: A. Stepanov
- Music by: Carlo Rustichelli
- Distributed by: Mosfilm
- Release date: 31 January 1974
- Running time: 100 minutes
- Countries: Soviet Union; Italy
- Languages: Russian, Italian
- Budget: 49,200,000 Rbls

Unbelievable Adventures of Italians in Russia (Russian: Невероятные приключения итальянцев в России, translit. Neveroyatnye Priklyucheniya Italyantsev v Rossii) or A Crazy, Crazy, Crazy Race in Russia (Italian: Una matta, matta, matta corsa in Russia) is a 1974 Soviet-Italian comedy film directed by Eldar Ryazanov and Franco Prosperi. The plot is about a group of Italian treasure hunters who set on a journey to find long-forgotten treasure in Leningrad.

== Plot summary ==
In a hospital in Rome, a poor 92-year-old white Russian émigré lies on her deathbed. She reveals to her granddaughter Olga there is a treasure worth 9 billion Italian lire buried "underneath a lion" in Leningrad. However, the story is overheard by the woman's attending physician, two male nurses named Antonio and Giuseppe, a mafioso named Rosario, and a patient with a broken leg. All six of the characters fly to Leningrad to hunt for the treasure.

When flying the mafioso steals the doctor's passport, but then he broke a window, eventually leading to emergency landing. The doctor, without a passport, is forced to make round trips from Russia to Italy since neither country will accept him. Antonio and Giuseppe are soon joined by Andrei, an undercover captain of the Soviet militsiya who poses as a tour guide for Antonio, who purports to grant Antonio free tours on the basis that he is "the millionth Italian visitor". Olga doesn't plan to share her treasure with anyone and runs away, but agrees to join forces with Andrei, while Rosario the mafioso continues his attempts to eliminate the competition. They start digging up lion statues all over Leningrad, which is a city well known for its many lion monuments.

They eventually find the treasure hidden underneath a lion cage at a zoo, but the lion starts chasing them through Leningrad. After making a successful escape they are confronted by the police who confiscate the treasure, which belongs to the state under the Soviet law. Nonetheless, they are awarded 25% of the value of the treasure as a reward for finding it. The now-wealthy adventurers part their ways and return to Italy, but Olga decides to stay with Andrei in the end.

== Cast ==
- Andrei Mironov — Andrei Vasiliev
- Ninetto Davoli — Giuseppe (voiced by Mikhail Kononov)
- Antonia Santilli — Olga (voiced by Natalia Gurzo)
- Alighiero Noschese — Antonio Lo Mazzo (voiced by Aleksandr Belyavskiy)
- Tano Cimarosa — Rosario Agrò (voiced by Mikhail Gluzsky)
- Yevgeniy Yevstigneyev — Lame man
- Olga Aroseva — Andrey's mother
- Lion named King

== Production ==
=== Screenplay ===
Eldar Ryazanov dreamed of working with Italian filmmakers and in 1970 wrote a pitch for a comedy Spaghetti Russian-style with Emil Braginsky, but Goskino officials didn't like it as they found the Italian characters too stereotypical. Same year Sergei Bondarchuk finished Waterloo co-produced by Mosfilm and Dino De Laurentiis who ended owning Mosfilm a lot of money and suggested to return it by producing a light cheap comedy. This is when Ryazanov and Braginsky were contacted.

They were joined by Franco Castellano and Giuseppe Moccia to finish the script. As Ryazonov wrote, he originally planned something in the vein of Cops and Robbers and his own Beware of the Car, with Alberto Sordi as a small Italian fraud and Innokenty Smoktunovsky as a Russian policeman attached, but Italian co-authors saw this idea as old-fashioned and sentimental and asked for a fast-paced commercial comedy. In two months Braginsky and Ryazonov finished a new screenplay, only this time Dino De Laurentiis didn't like it and asked them to rewrite everything except for the scenes with a living lion. The final script was inspired by the comedy It's a Mad, Mad, Mad, Mad World which Ryazanov watched the same night at the hotel.

=== Shooting ===
It was Ryazanov's original intention to make a stunt-based comedy completely avoiding compositing, thus only practical effects were used. The episode with a plane landing on a M1 highway among passing cars which parodied a scene from The Sicilian Clan was the hardest to make. It had to be shot at the Ulyanovsk Baratayevka Airport disguised as a highway since no road surface was hard enough for such task. The stunt was performed by a pilot and a deputy chief of the Ulyanovsk Institute of Civil Aviation Ivan Tarashan.

The episodes with the VAZ-2103 driven by Olga chased by the Moskvich 412 driven by Andrei with Italians onboard parodied the Henri Verneuil's movie "Le Casse".

Another episode with a filling station blowing up and various station and car parts flying in the air parodied Michelangelo Antonioni's Zabriskie Point and was also shot without chroma key or miniature effects, although the station itself was a mere replica empty from inside.

Most of the stunts during the car chasing scenes were performed by the acclaimed Italian racer and stuntman Sergio Mioni. Actors Andrei Mironov and Ninetto Davoli did a number of risky tricks by themselves, including the scene with a moveable bridge where Davoli made a long jump with a suitcase in his hand while Mironov had to hang for a while holding tight into one part of the bridge to pose for a close-up.

=== Lion King ===
For a real lion Ryazanov called Lev Berberov, a Baku engineer famous for raising several wild animals in his flat including a lion named King. Berberov insisted that more scenes and tricks with King should be added to the script. Yet it turned out the lion was hardly capable of even simplest tasks and didn't pay attention to anyone. Ryazanov described it as "untrained, ignorant and dull as it seemed" and the whole experience — as exhausting; during the first scene King scratched Ninetto Davoli which left all actors terrified. Mikhail Kozlov, a leading research fellow of the Zoological Institute of the Russian Academy of Sciences, also wasn't complementary about the lion: "During the close-ups the lush mane disguised paws bowed by rickets, curved back, flabby muscles, but in motion all those problems showed up."

Some sources wrongly state that during the filming King ran away and was shot by a police officer. In fact by that time all scenes with the lion had been completed and the Berberov family moved to Moscow where King was temporarily kept in a gym of a secondary school No. 74 near Mosfilm. At one point it jumped through a window and attacked a student who had climbed over a school fence to get his dog ("to tease the lion" as the Berberovs would claim). His girlfriend started screaming, someone called the police, and Alexander Gurov — then a simple lieutenant — quickly arrived and shot King dead. As Gurov later recalled, the Berberovs didn't care for the student covered in blood, instead they started insulting him and later used their friendship with Sergey Obraztsov to reach the Minister of Internal Affairs Nikolai Shchelokov who also shouted at him until he heard the full story. The family soon got a new lion, King II, who grew up and in 1980 killed their own son.

== Reception ==
In the Soviet Union the movie was seen by 49.2 million people, becoming one of the leaders of the 1974 Soviet box office.
