= Sergey Aleksandrovich Popov =

Russian politician

Sergey Popov
- Сергей Попов
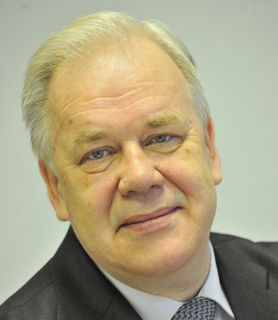
- Popov in 2011

Russian Federation Senator from Omsk Oblast
- In office 29 September 2016 – February 2018
- Preceded by: Andrey Golushko
- Succeeded by: Viktor Nazarov

Member of the State Duma
- In office 7 December 2003 – 29 September 2016

Personal details
- Born: Sergey Aleksandrovich Popov; 21 July 1949 (age 77) Moscow, Soviet Union
- Party: United Russia
- Children: Andrey

Sergey Aleksandrovich Popov (Russian: Сергей Александрович Попов; born 21 July 1949) is a Russian politician, who was a member of the Federation Council of Omsk Oblast on legislative authority between 29 September 2016 and February 2018, a member of the State Duma of the IV-VI convocations, a member of the United Russia party.

== Biography ==
Sergey Popov was born in Moscow on 21 July 1949.

=== Education ===
From 1966 to 1971, he was a student of the Moscow Mining Institute. He graduated in 1971.

He graduated from the Moscow Institute of Management named after S. Ordzhonikidze in 1982, and from the Moscow Higher Party School in 1987. He has a PhD in Political Science. He is a professor of the Academy of Military Sciences.

== Career ==
From 1971 to 1973, he was an engineer at the Moscow Research Institute of Radio Communications.

From 1973 to 1976, he was an instructor, and the head of the department of the Zhdanovsky Komsomol District Committee in Moscow.

Between 1976 and 1983, he was an instructor, and the deputy head of the Zhdanovsky CPSU District Committee department in Moscow.

Between 1983 and 1990, he was an instructor, head of the sector, and the deputy head of the department of the CPSU Moscow City Committee.

While working at the Moscow City Committee of the CPSU, he was responsible for organizing mass events in the capital, with demonstrations and processions, sports and tourism. He was a deputy head of the headquarters for the Goodwill Games in 1984 and the 12th World Festival of Youth and Students in 1985, participated in events related to the 1000th anniversary of the Baptism of Russia.

From 1990 to 1992, he was the Deputy Executive Director of the Council of the General Confederation of Trade Unions of the USSR.

Between 1992 and 1995, Popov was the Deputy General Director of the Creative Association "Russian Directorate" LLP, director of the "Russian Christmas" project. He participated in the organization of concerts, with "Alla Pugacheva's Christmas Meetings", and toured of world music stars together with Stas Namin. In 1992, he arranged in France Russian Christmas in Paris.

In 1995, he was promoted to executive director, and was the Senior Manager of Taganka Trade Center OJSC.

== Political career ==
Between 1995 and 2001, Popov was the First Deputy Director-Executive Director, Director of the Interregional Public Institution "People's House". He was the Chairman of the Council of the All-Russian Public Movement "All-Russian Union of People's Houses" from 1998 to 2001.

In 1996, Popov was the executive director of the headquarters of the election campaign of Boris Yeltsin in the presidential elections.

In 1999, Popov was appointed deputy head of the headquarters of the Unity electoral bloc in the elections to the State Duma, then was promoted as the chairman of the Central Executive Committee of the Unity party from 2000 to 2001, and was the chairman of the commission of the political council of the party on regional policy. Twice he was the financial commissioner of the candidate in the presidential elections, Vladimir Putin.

Between December 2000 and 2003, Popov was the member of the Federation Council from the administration of the Ust-Orda Buryat Autonomous Okrug. He was a member of the Committee on Federation Affairs and Regional Policy; Deputy Chairman of the Commission on Regulations and Organization of Parliamentary Activities; member of the Commission on Rules and Parliamentary Procedures; Member of the Commission on Methodology for the Implementation of the Constitutional Powers of the Federation Council of the Russian Federation.

On 1 December 2001, at the founding congress of the United Russia party, Popov was elected a member of its General Council, later a member of the Presidium of the General Council.

On 7 December 2003, Popov became a member of the 4th State Duma, and was a member of the United Russia faction.

Between 2003 and 2011, he was the Chairman of the State Duma Committee on Public Associations and Religious Organizations.

In 2004, he was the President of the Inter-Parliamentary Assembly of Orthodoxy. In 2007, he was the head of the party project "Historical Memory".

On 2 December 2007, he was elected to the State Duma of 5th convocation on the list of the United Russia Party.

On 4 December 2011, he was elected to the 6th State Duma on the list of the United Russia Party.

From January to December 2012, he was demoted to First Deputy Chairman of the State Duma Committee on Public Associations and Religious Organizations. From 2012 to 2015, he was the Chairman of the State Duma Committee on the regulations and organization of the work of the State Duma. In March 2012, he has been a member of the State Duma Commission for Controlling the Accuracy of Information on Income, Property and Property Liabilities Submitted by State Duma Deputies. In 2015, he was a member of the State Duma Defense Committee.

In October 2015, he has been the first deputy head of the United Russia faction in the State Duma.

He was a member of the Presidium of the General Council of the United Russia party.

On 29 September 2016, Popov became a Member of the Federation Council, a representative of the legislative authority of Omsk Oblast. He was the Deputy Chairman of the Federation Council Committee on Regulations and Organization of the Work of Parliamentary Activities.

On September 14, 2018, Popov prematurely terminated his activities as a member of the Federation Council. He has been Advisor to the General Director of the State Space Corporation Roscosmos.

He is the author of a number of books, brochures and articles on the development of the political system in Russia, the results of election campaigns, commentaries on the laws "On the Public Chamber of the Russian Federation", "On the Procedure for Appeal of Citizens" and a number of others.

=== Initiatives ===
As a member of parliament of the State Duma, Popov from 2004 to 2016, had more than 50 laws adopted, providing for:

- ensuring the implementation of the constitutional rights of citizens to participate and hold rallies, demonstrations, pickets, meetings
- the procedure for citizens to apply, freedom of conscience and religion
- the development of civil society institutions: non-profit organizations, including socially oriented, public and religious associations, public chambers and monitoring commissions for the observance of the rights of citizens in places of detention
- the improvement of the activities of political parties, the procedure for their functioning, financing and media coverage
- the procedure for the transfer of religious property
- the organization of parliamentary and public control
- the protection and preservation of monuments of historical and cultural heritage.

== Income ==
The total amount of declared income for 2015 was 5 million 820 thousand rubles and for 2016 was 5 million 843 thousand rubles.

== Sanctions ==
Since June 21, 2018, he has been under personal sanctions from Ukraine.

== Family ==
He is married and has a son, Andrey.

== Awards ==
- 1986 – Medal "For Distinguished Labour"
- 1996, 2000, 2008 – Gratitude of the President of the Russian Federation
- 2004 – Order of Honour
- 2005 – Order of St. Sergius of Radonezh, II degree
- 2007 – Order "For Merit to the Fatherland", IV degree
- 2008 – Order of St. Seraphim of Sarov, III degree
- 2009 – Certificate of Honour from the Government of the Russian Federation
- 2011 – Order of Holy Prince Daniel of Moscow, II degree
- 2013 – Order of Holy Prince Daniel of Moscow, III degree
- 2014 – Medal of Stolypin P. A., II degree
- 2014 – Order of Alexander Nevsky
