= Active reserve (KGB) =

Member of the KGB undercover in the Soviet Union

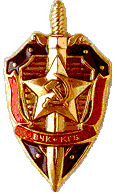
The sword-and-shield emblem of the KGB

The active reserve of the KGB (Russian: действующий резерв КГБ) are members of the organization who work undercover "either pretending to assume various jobs or using as cover professions in which they are actually trained". Active reserve KGB officers typically occupied such positions as deputy directors of scientific research or deans responsible for foreign relations in academic institutions of the Soviet Union, although these people were not scientists. Other officers were trained for certain civilian jobs, usually translators, journalists, telephone engineers, or doormen in hotels that served foreigners.

The active reserve was significantly expanded in Post-Soviet Russia, when a majority of positions in the Russian power elite were occupied by acting or undercover officers of the Russian state security services, such as the FSB and SVR, the official successors of the KGB. "The only difference between them [officers of active reserve] and regular civil-servants is that they have an extra duty: writing reports every month for the FSB. They are the eyes of the master”, said sociologist Olga Krychtanovskaia.

== Background ==
Undercover staff of the KGB included three major categories: (a) the active reserve; (b) the "trusted contacts" (or "reliable people"), and (c) "civilian informers" (or "secret helpers"). The "active reserve" included KGB officers with a military rank who worked undercover in the Soviet Union. "Trusted contacts" were high placed civilians who collaborated with the KGB without signing any official working agreements, such as directors of personnel departments at various institutions, academics, deans, or writers and actors. Informers were citizens secretly recruited by the KGB, sometimes using forceful recruitment methods, such as blackmail. The precise number of people from various categories remains unknown, but one of the estimates was 11 million "informers" in the Soviet Union, or one out of every eighteen adult citizens.

== History ==
The active reserve was established by Yuri Andropov in the end of the 1960s. "Active reservists" worked in all organizations of importance including press and television.

A "Law on Foreign Intelligence" adopted in August 1992 provided conditions for penetration by former KGB officers to all levels of the government and economy, since it stipulated that "career personnel may occupy positions in ministries, departments, establishments, enterprises and organizations in accordance with the requirements of this law without compromising their association with foreign intelligence agencies." "All big companies have to put people from the security services on the board of directors... and we know that when Lubyanka calls, they have to answer them", said a Russian banker. A current FSB colonel explained that "We must make sure that companies don't make decisions that are not in the interest of the state".

Olga Kryshtanovskaya, director of the Moscow-based Center for the Study of Elites, has found in the beginning of the 2000s (decade) that up to 78% of 1,016 leading political figures in post-Soviet Russia have served previously in organizations affiliated with the KGB or FSB. She said: "If in the Soviet period and the first post-Soviet period, the KGB and FSB people were mainly involved in security issues, now half are still involved in security but the other half are involved in business, political parties, NGOs, regional governments, even culture... They started to use all political institutions."

== Notable active reserve officers ==
Many Russian democratic politicians and businessmen hired officers of the active reserve as their closest associates. Most did this knowingly to receive the support of the powerful organization. Anatoly Sobchak asked for advice from Oleg Kalugin in 1990. He said: "I feel isolated. I need a person who can maintain contacts with the KGB, which controls the city". Very soon Sobchak hired Vladimir Putin who allegedly remained in the active reserve at this time.

Tycoon Mikhail Khodorkovsky hired former KGB general Alexei Kondaurov. Mayor of Moscow Yuri Luzhkov had Yevgeny Primakov, then director of Russian Foreign intelligence. In 1991 businessman Vladimir Gusinsky hired General Philipp Bobkov who supervised the entire system of active reserve in the Soviet Union. Bobkov officially served as a head of security in the Media Most company that belonged to Gusinsky.

== See also ==
- Front organization
- Agents provocateurs
- Agent of influence
