= Viktor Sobolev (politician) =

Russian politician

Viktor Sobolev MP
- Виктор Соболев
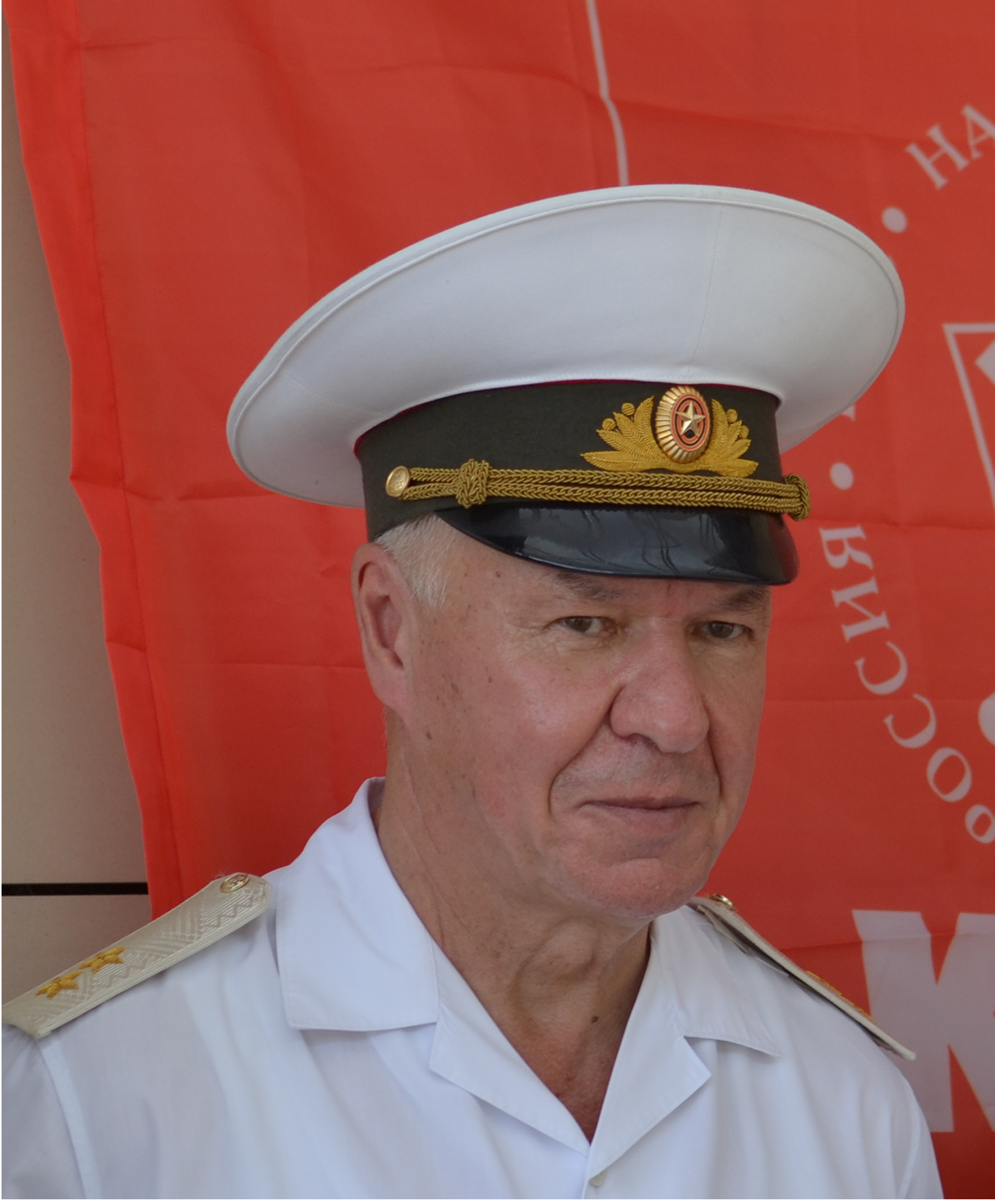

Member of the State Duma (Party List Seat)
- Incumbent
- Assumed office 12 October 2021

Personal details
- Born: 23 February 1950 (age 76) Kalinino, Krasnodar Krai, Russian SFSR, Soviet Union
- Party: Communist Party of the Russian Federation (since 2011)
- Other political affiliations: Movement in Support of the Army (since 2014)
- Spouse: Tamara Grigorievna Soboleva
- Children: Igor Viktorovich Sobolev
- Education: Baku Higher Combined Arms Command School; Frunze Military Academy; Armed Forces General Staff Military Academy

Military service
- Allegiance: Soviet Union; Russian Federation
- Branch/service: Soviet Ground Forces; Russian Ground Forces
- Years of service: 1967-2010
- Rank: Lt. General
- Commands: 129th Guards Machine Gun Artillery Division; 12th Military Base; 58th Combined Arms Army

Viktor Ivanovich Sobolev (Russian: Виктор Иванович Соболев; born 23 February 1950, Kalinino, Krasnodar Krai) is a Russian political and military figure, and a deputy of the 8th State Duma.

== Military career (1981–2011) ==
After graduating from the Baku Higher Combined Arms Command School, Sobolev was assigned to serve in Chernivtsi in the Carpathian Military District. In 1981, after graduating from the Frunze Military Academy, he served in the Far Eastern Military District. Later Sobolev was appointed the commander of the 129th Guards Rifle Division.

In 2000, he was sent to the Siberian Military District as deputy commander of the 41st Combined Arms Army. In 2003, he headed the 58th Combined Arms Army.

In 2006 Sobolev was posted as a chief military adviser in India.

== Political career (2011–present) ==
In 2011 he joined the Communist Party of the Russian Federation.

In September 2021 he was elected deputy of the 8th State Duma.

=== Sanctions ===
Sobolev was sanctioned by the UK government in 2022 in relation to the Russo-Ukrainian War.
