= Viktor Vidmanov =

Russian politician (1934–2025)

- Виктор Видьманов

Member of the State Duma
- In office 7 December 2003 – 2007

Personal details
- Born: Viktor Mikhailovich Vidmanov; 25 February 1934 Davydovka, Russian SFSR, Soviet Union
- Died: August 2025 Moscow, Russia
- Party: Communist Party of the Russian Federation

Viktor Mikhailovich Vidmanov (Russian: Виктор Михайлович Видьманов; 25 February 1934 – August 2025) was a Russian politician.

== Life and career ==
Vidmanov was born in Davydovka, Ulyanovsk Oblast on 25 February 1934.

In 1999, he was elected a deputy of the State Duma of the third convocation from the Communist Party of the Russian Federation, he refused his mandate in connection with the continuation of his activities in his previous positions.

On 7 December 2003, he was again elected a deputy of the State Duma of the fourth convocation.

He was awarded the Order of the October Revolution, two Orders of the Red Banner of Labour, the Order of Friendship of Peoples and was named an Honored Builder of the Russian Federation.

Vidmanov died in Moscow in August 2025, at the age of 91.
