= Lev Berberov =

Soviet architect (1903–1978)

Lev Lvovich Berberov
- Born: 1914
- Died: 1978 (aged 63–64); Baku, Azerbaijan SSR, USSR
- Education: Baku Industrial Institute
- Occupation: Architect
- Spouse: Nina Petrovna Berberova
- Buildings: Palace of Culture named after I. Franko
- Projects: Plan for forming the public center of Donetsk (1949), detailed planning project for the center of Donetsk (1953)

Lev Lvovich Berberov (1914—1978) was an architect and the owner of famous lions that appeared in films.

== Architect ==
In 1937, Lev Lvovich Berberov graduated from the Baku Industrial Institute (now the Azerbaijan State University of Oil and Industry). He then spent a year in the workshop of the academician of architecture, Karo Alabyan. For the next three years, he worked as an architect in the Leninsky District of Moscow. During the Great Patriotic War (World War II), he worked in the military design management center.

Berberov served as the chief architect of Horlivka and later became the chief architect of Stalino (now Donetsk) on three separate occasions. He was first appointed to this position on 21 June 1945. succeeding the previous chief architect, Alexey Avvakumovich Mizernitsky.

After moving from Horlivka to Donetsk, a newspaper, Socialist Donbass, published an article accusing Berberov of leaving unpaid utility bills in Horlivka and taking everything from the state-provided apartment, including a telephone, stove, built-in furniture, switches, and even light sockets. On 25 July 1947, he was transferred to the reserve by an order from the Architecture Administration under the Council of Ministers of the Ukrainian SSR.

During Berberov's tenure as the chief architect, efforts were focused on restoring the city's infrastructure and buildings damaged during the war, including mines, factories, buildings of the Donetsk Industrial Institute (now Donetsk National Technical University), the Central Department Store, the State Bank, and others. The construction of a dam on the Kalmius river was completed, allowing Dzerzhinsky Avenue to connect the Kalinovka settlement with the city center. This dam's construction also led to the creation of the Nyzhnekalmius reservoir.

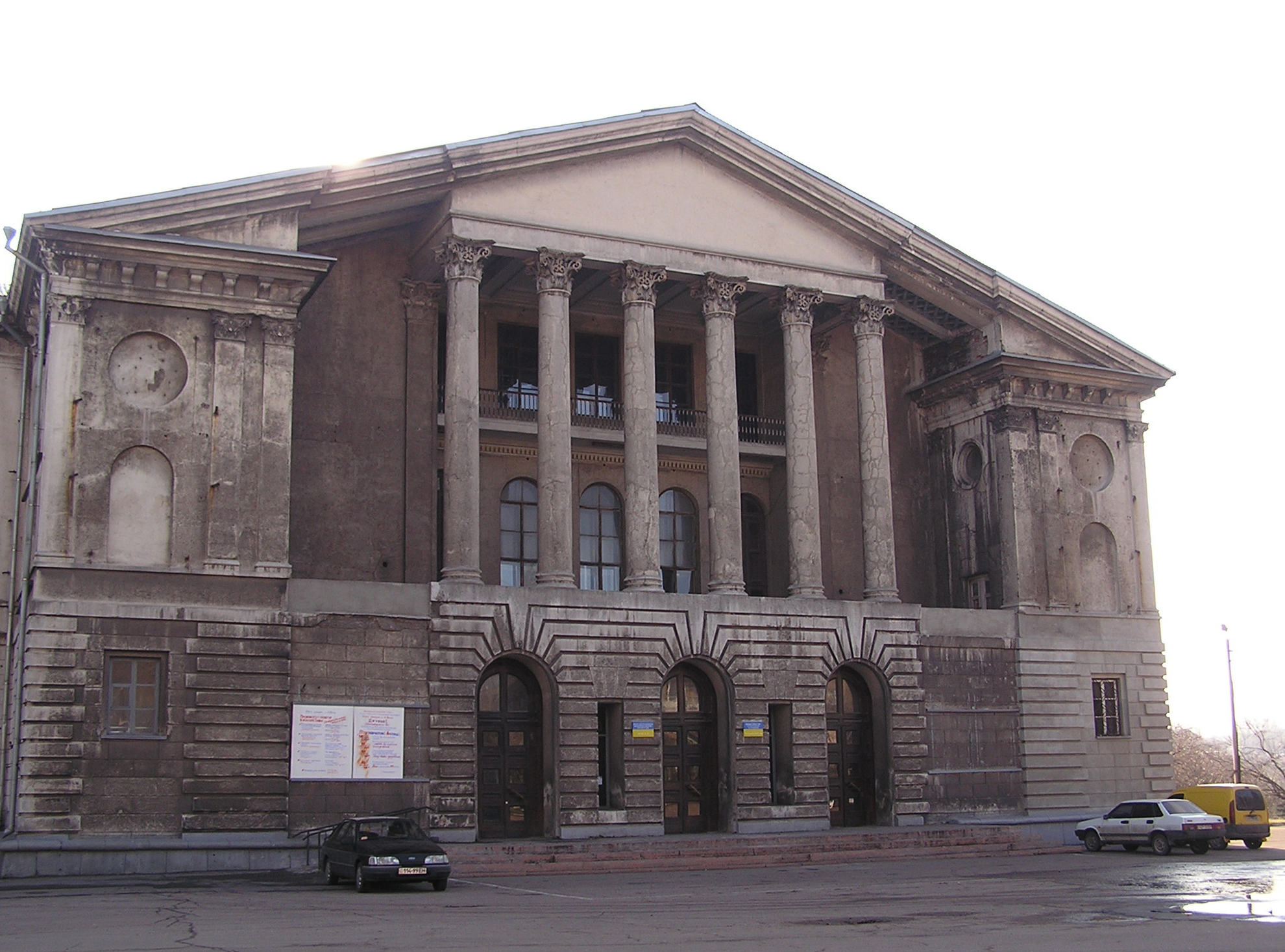
The Ivan Franko Palace of Culture (Donetsk)

Berberov restored and reconstructed the Ivan Franko Palace of Culture.

In 1949, Berberov, along with architects V. M. Orekhov and T. I. Bondarenko, developed a plan for the formation of the city's public center for Giprogor. In 1953, they developed a detailed planning project for the center of Stalino, introducing significant changes compared to the 1949 plan.

In 1952, Berberov once again took the position of chief architect of Stalino but was transferred to Horlivka four years later. After a brief return to Stalino, Berberov left his family in Donetsk and moved to Baku, where he started a new family. In Baku, he worked at the Bakgiprogor Institute.

== Lions ==
In Baku, the Berberov family kept large predatory animals (lions and a puma) at home. Their pets appeared in various feature films. A film story titled I Have a Lion was made about the family. The head of the family left his job as an architect and devoted himself entirely to his animals.

In 1973, the young police officer Alexander Gurov shot and killed the lion King I.

Alexander Ivanovich could never have imagined that his name, fate, and career would be tied to a lion. A young lieutenant serving at the Gagarinsky district police department in Moscow, Alexander Gurov, was on duty when he received information that a lion starring in the film The Unbelievable Adventures of Italians in Russia had attacked a person in his jurisdiction. He immediately went to the scene.

Seeing the horrifying sight of an enraged lion with a man in its jaws, he made the only correct decision—to shoot to kill. He emptied the entire magazine of his service-issue Makarov pistol. The lion, struck by bullets, fell backward, releasing the man from its jaws. The man, though seriously injured, was saved.

Later, in gratitude, he presented Gurov with a gift that is still kept today—a radio receiver engraved with the words: 'To Alexander Ivanovich Gurov. Thank you for my life. Volodya Markov'.

— "Gurov and the Lion," Petrovka 38

However, the newspaper Telenedelya described the situation differently: a young man climbed into the lion's enclosure himself to show bravery to his girlfriend. The lion approached the young man, the girl screamed, and Officer Gurov, who was nearby, ran over and shot the lion. The lion stopped and turned to return to its place. The young man had already climbed over the fence, but the officer emptied his entire magazine into the lion. The next day, newspapers reported that the law enforcement officer had saved the young man from certain death.

In 1978, Berberov died of a heart attack, and his family could no longer manage the lions. On November 24, 1980, the lion King II killed Berberov's son, Roman, and injured his widow, Nina Berberova.

Later, Nina Berberova married Kazym Abdullayev, an actor at the Azerbaijan State Drama Theater, who helped her cope with her psychological and physical trauma. She died in 2018.

== Links ==
- Е. Ясенов. "Главный Лев города Сталино". Archived from the original on 2016-03-05.
