= Vladimir Pekhtin =

Russian politician

- Владимир Пехтин
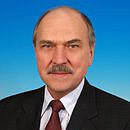

Deputy Chairman of the State Duma
- In office 29 December 2003 – 24 December 2007
- Preceded by: Oleg Morozov
- Succeeded by: Dmitry Rogozin

Member of Parliament
- In office 1999 – 20 February 2013

Personal details
- Born: Vladimir Alekseyevich Pekhtin; 9 December 1950 (age 75) Leningrad, Soviet Union
- Party: United Russia
- Education: Leningrad Polytechnic Institute

Vladimir Alekseyevich Pekhtin (Russian: Влади́мир Алексе́евич Пе́хтин; born 9 December 1950) is a Russian politician. He was a deputy of the State Duma for the 3rd, 4th, 5th, and 6th convocations. He chaired the parliament's ethics committee and served as Deputy Chairman of the State Duma. He was the first deputy chairman of the United Russia party. Pekhtin formerly served on the board of electric holding company RAO UES and was the Director General of Kolymaenergo, a subsidiary of RusHydro.

Pekhtin resigned from the State Duma in February 2013, following revelations that he owned over $1.3 million in Florida real estate.

== Early life and education ==
Vladimir Pekhtin was born on 9 December 1950 in Leningrad. He attended Leningrad Polytechnic Institute, graduating in 1974 with a degree in hydraulic engineering. In 1997, Pekhtin received a Candidate of Sciences degree from the Saint Petersburg State Technical University. He received his Doktor Nauk degree in 1999.

== Career ==
=== Engineering career ===
From 1982 to 1989, Pekhtin worked at the Kolyma Hydroelectric Station, rising to the Deputy Director position. From 1992 to 1997, he was General Director of Kolymaenergo, a subsidiary of RusHydro. He served on the board of electric holding company RAO UES from 1997 to 1998.

=== Political career ===
Pekhtin ran for the State Duma in 1993, but lost the election. In 1994, he became a deputy in the first convocation of the Magadan Regional Duma.

Pekhtin was elected to the 3rd convocation of the State Duma in 1999. He headed the United Russia party in the State Duma from April 2001 to December 2003. On 29 March 2003, Pekhtin was elected a member of the supreme council of the United Russia party. Pekhtin was reelected to the fourth convocation of the State Duma in December 2003. He became Deputy Chairman of the State Duma and the first Deputy Head of the United Russia party. In 2007, he was elected to the fifth convocation of the State Duma.

Pekhtin supervised the Kremlin's CIS election observation mission for the 2008 parliamentary election in Belarus. While state-controlled media labelled opposition leaders as traitors, several of whom were imprisoned by the Belarusian KGB, Pekhtin said that all of recent elections in former Soviet republics were democratic and fair. He contradicted the conclusions of the OSCE, saying "They just made it up, invented it, to try to show that there was some kind of rot."

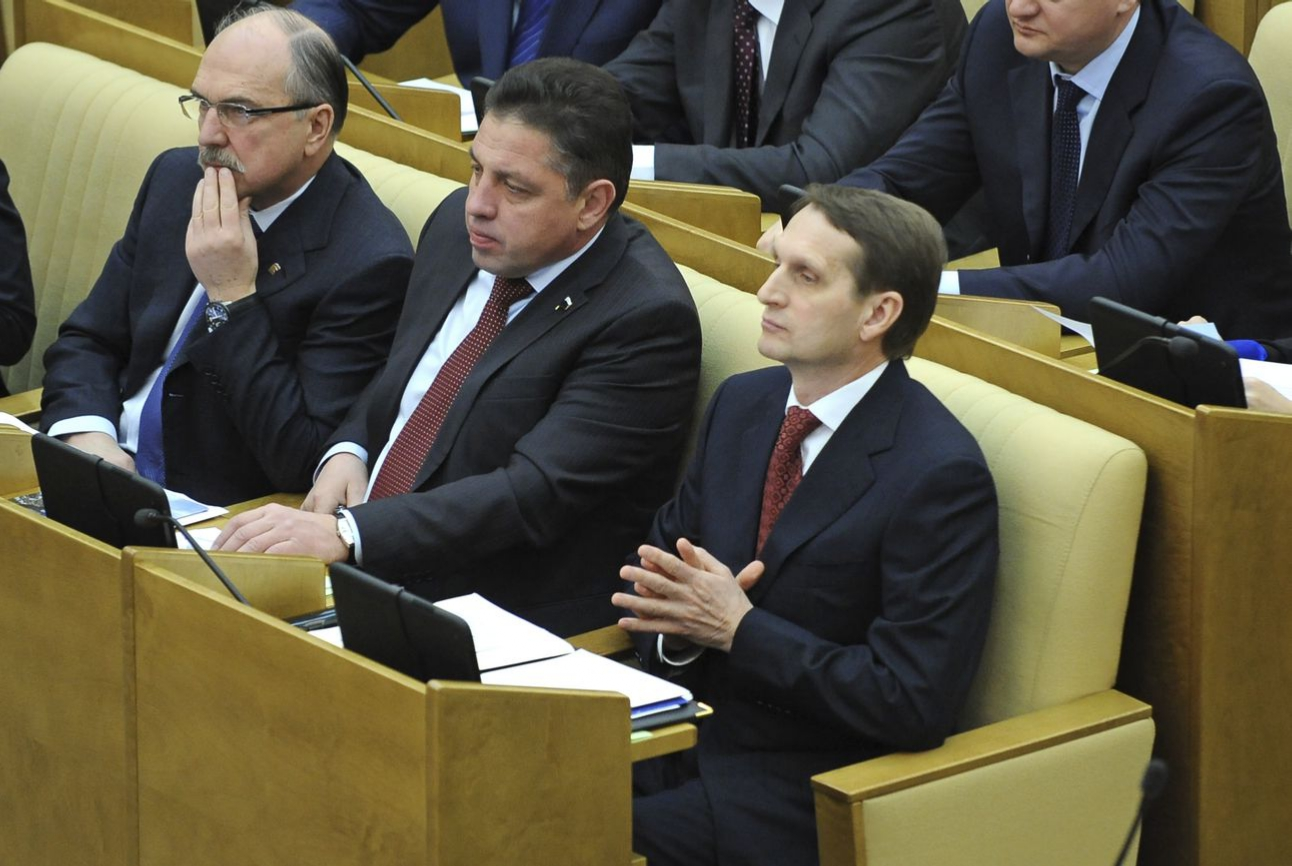
Pekhtin (left) in 2011

In 2012, Pekhtin became Chairman of the State Duma's ethics committee.

Pekhtin supported the 2013 Dima Yakovlev Law, which barred US citizens from adopting Russian orphans.

==== Corruption scandal ====
On 30 August 2012, Duma deputy Dmitry Gudkov published a LiveJournal post entitled "Gold pretzels: United Russia". The post mentioned Pekhtin as one of the individuals with discrepancies between their declared income and the value of their property. On 31 August, Kommersant published an article about real estate transactions that, according to the opposition, were part of a well-disguised commercial project to sell the land to the state for the construction of highway at a profit of roughly 75 million rubles. A comparison of Pekhtin's 2010 and 2011 declarations showed that in 2011 he purchased an at least three plots of land in St. Petersburg worth over 25 million rubles.

In 2011, Pekhtin had declared an income of 2.15 million rubles. His declaration indicated that he and his wife owned nine plots of land, two apartments, two houses, two non-residential buildings, and five cars (a Porsche Cayenne, a Toyota Land Cruiser, and three Mercedes-Benz) as well as personal watercraft and snowmobiles.

On 12 February 2013, Alexei Navalny, based on publicly available real estate data, reported on Pekhtin's link to real estate in Miami worth $2.5 million. According to the documents, Pekhtin owned an apartment in a Flamingo South Beach condominium and land in Florida. The apartment was purchased for $540,000 in 2007 and the land for $120,000. Published contracts indicated that half of the real estate was owned by his son, Alexei Pekhtin. The son also owned an apartment in a residential complex at 1500 Ocean Drive. Prior to December 2012, half of the $1.27 million apartment was owned by the elder Pekhtin.

Pekhtin resigned from the State Duma on 20 February 2013, following revelations from Alexei Navalny that he owned over $1.3 million of undeclared real estate in Florida. Both Anatoly Lomakin and Vasily Tolstopyatov resigned shortly after Pekhtin.

=== Later career ===
Pekhtin became a member of the Management Board of RusHydro in April 2013. He became Director General of the RusHydro hydrotechnology institute Lenhydroproject in March 2014.
