= Andrey Golovatyuk =

Russian politician

Andrey Mikhailovich Golovatiuk (Russian: Андрей Михайлович Головатюк, also transliterated as Andrei Golovatuk), born December 17, 1968, is a member for the LDPR of the State Duma of Russia. He has attended a university of military engineering. He is a member of the Duma committee of defense. He was formerly a commander of a Ministry of Internal Affairs Special Forces division.

== State Duma Deputy ==
In 2003, he ran for the 4th State Duma of Russia as a candidate from the LDPR, listed as number 7 on the party’s central list.

In 2007, he ran for the 5th State Duma from the LDPR as the lead candidate in Regional Group No. 17 (Voronezh Region), but was not elected.

From 2008 to 2009, he served as Deputy Head of the Control Directorate of the Central Election Commission of the Russian Federation.

From 2009 to 2012, he was Chairman of the Central Control and Revision Commission of DOSAAF.

From 2012 to 2014, he held the position of Vice Chairman of DOSAAF.

Since 2015, he has served as Deputy General Director of the State Public Institution "AMPP" (Administrator of Moscow Parking Space).

He has received numerous military and civil awards, including the LDPR Veteran Medal and the Medal of the Order “For Merit to the Fatherland,” 1st class (2006).
