= Maksim Rokhmistrov =

Russian politician

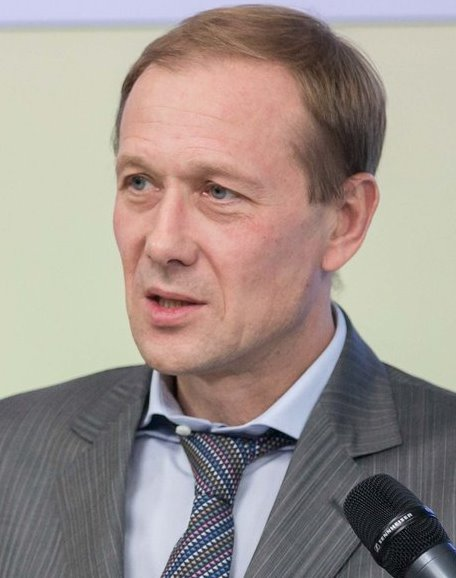
Maksim Stanislavovich Rokhmistrov

Maksim Stanislavovich Rokhmistrov (Russian: Макси́м Станисла́вович Ро́хмистров, also transliterated as Maxim Rokhmistrov; born January 5, 1968, in Kirzhach) is a member of the State Duma of Russia for the Liberal Democratic Party of Russia. Rokhmistrov is Deputy Chairman of the Duma Committee on Property, and was previously chairman of the Secretariat of the Deputy Chairman of the State Duma.

Maksim Rokhmistrov was elected deputy of the 4th, 5th, 6th State Dumas.
