= Valentin Bobyrev =

Russian politician

Bobyrev Valentin Vasilyevich
- Бобырев Валентин Васильевич
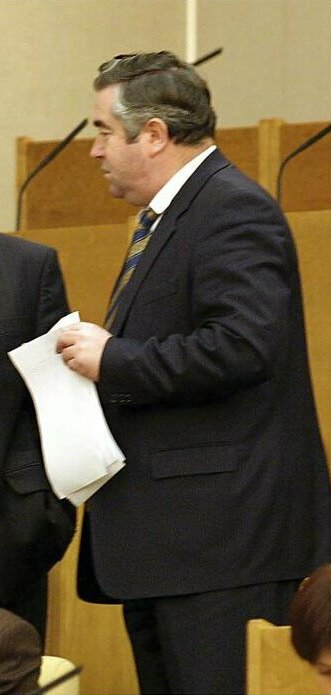
- Born: November 23, 1947 (age 78); Valuyki, Kursk Oblast, RSFSR, USSR

Valentin Vasilyevich Bobyrev (Russian: Валентин Васильевич Бобырев; born November 27, 1947) is a member of the State Duma of Russia for the United Russia party. He is a jurist, and sits on the State Duma's Committee on National Security. He used to be a deputy head of the Novosibirsk Oblast government.

== Biography ==
Since 1966, he served in the Soviet Army, and from 1969 onward in the internal affairs bodies. In 1971, he graduated from the Kaliningrad Police School and, in 1971–1996, held positions within the operational and command staff. In 1977, he completed his studies at the All-Union Correspondence Law Institute with a degree in law; in 1983, he graduated from the Academy of the USSR Ministry of Internal Affairs with a specialization in “lawyer — organizer of management in the field of public order.”

In 1996–1997, he served as Deputy General Director of ZAO Menatep Impex Sugar Trading Company; in 1997–1998, he was deputy director of the Directorate for New Technological Projects at Yukos.

In 1999–2002, he worked in the federal bodies of the Tax Police of the Russian Federation: as Head of the Director's Advisory Group, First Deputy Head of a Directorate, and, in 2000, as Head of the Main Organizational and Inspection Directorate of the Federal Tax Police Service of Russia.

In 2002–2003, he served as Deputy General Director of the company Basic Element.

In 2003, he was appointed Deputy Head of the Administration of Novosibirsk Oblast. In the same year, he was elected a deputy of the State Duma of the Federal Assembly of the Russian Federation of the 4th convocation (LDPR faction), and from 2007 — a deputy of the 5th convocation (United Russia faction). Since 2003, he served as Deputy Chairman of the Committee on Security and was a member of the Commission for the Review of Federal Budget Expenditures Related to Defense and State Security. From 2007, he served as Deputy Chairman of the State Duma Committee on Civil, Criminal, Arbitration, and Procedural Legislation.

Since 2011, he has served as Deputy Chairman of the Government of Omsk Oblast; since March 2012, he has been a deputy of the Settlement Council of the Zameletenovskoye Rural Settlement of Lyubinsky District, Omsk Oblast.

He is a member of the United Russia party and a member of the presidium of the political council of the Novosibirsk regional branch.

He is the author of more than twenty scholarly works.

== Awards ==
Order of "Pride of Russia" (2008)
