= Yevgeni Ivanov (politician) =

Russian politician (born 1964)

Yevgeni Viktorovich Ivanov (Russian: Евгений Викторович Иванов, also transliterated as Yevgeny; born August 16, 1964) is a member of the State Duma of Russia, and a member of LDPR. He is deputy chairman of the State Duma's Committee on Budget Issues and Taxes. He is a graduate in history of Kuban State University in Russia.
