= Oleg Skorlukov =

Russian politician

Oleg Albertovich Skorlukov (Russian: Олег Альбертович Скорлуков; born March 2, 1968) is a Russian politician who served in the State Duma of Russia. He has attended higher education. He is a member of the LDPR. His was Deputy Chairman of the Committee on Economic Policy, Entrepreneurship and Tourism.

== State Duma Deputy ==
In 2003, he ran for the 4th convocation of the State Duma as a candidate from the Liberal Democratic Party of Russia (LDPR), listed third on the party list for the Urals region. He was elected and became Deputy Chairman of the State Duma Committee on Economic Policy, Entrepreneurship, and Tourism.

In 2011, he was appointed General Director of the joint-stock company Hotel National, which is owned by the Government of Moscow.

“It is a great honor for me to head this legendary hotel,” Skorlukov commented on his appointment.
