= Valentin Sviridov =

Russian politician

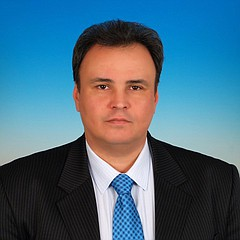
Valentin Valentinovich Sviridov

Valentin Valentinovich Sviridov (Russian: Валентин Валентинович Свиридов; born December 12, 1967) is a member of the LDPR and a deputy of the Russian State Duma. He is a member of two committees of the State Duma: Defense and Accounting.

In December 2011, he was elected as a deputy of the 6th State Duma of the Russian Federation as part of the federal list of candidates from the LDPR (Rostov Region). He served as a member of the State Duma Committee on Rules and Organization of Parliamentary Work. Following his election, he resigned from his position as coordinator of the LDPR's Rostov regional branch. He acted as the supervising deputy for the Rostov Region and the Southern Federal District.
