= Boris Gusakov =

Soviet serial killer and rapist

- Born: Boris Vasilyevich Gusakov; 1 January 1938; Balashikha, Moscow Oblast, RSFSR
- Died: 27 December 1970 (aged 32); Veliky Novgorod, Novgorod Oblast, RSFSR
- Cause of death: Execution by shooting
- Other name: "The Student Hunter"
- Convictions: Sexual assault Murder
- Penalty: Death

Details
- Victims: 6
- Span of crimes: 1964–1968
- Country: Soviet Union
- State: Moscow
- Date apprehended: 16 May 1968

Boris Vasilyevich Gusakov (Russian: Борис Васильевич Гусаков; 1 January 1938 – 27 December 1970), known as The Student Hunter (Russian: Охотник на студенток), was a Soviet serial killer convicted for the killing of 6 people in the Moscow area between 1964 and 1968. Gusakov, a serial rapist with a history of mental health issues, committed 6 murders and 15 violent sexual assaults on girls and young women before being caught, and was executed by firing squad in 1970.

== Background ==
Boris Vasilevich Gusakov was born in 1938, in the Saltykovka district of Balashikha, Moscow Oblast, Soviet Union. Gusakov was born into a family of alcoholics, and suffered from mental health issues from an early age, but these were often ignored due to the ongoing World War II. At the age of 3, Gusakov witnessed an eerie scene: a bomb dropped by the Germans killed several people, including a teenage girl who had her head blown off. Later on, during interrogations, Gusakov said that while committing attacks on his victims, he wanted to relive the scene he had seen in his childhood.

In 1955 he graduated from the school but did not enter higher education, and began working as a photographer. Gusakov married a librarian in 1958, and a daughter was born. He treated his daughter cruelly and tortured her. From 1958 to 1961, Gusakov served in the Soviet Army, and shortly after his discharge from the army he was convicted for theft. From May 1962 to July 1965 he worked as a photographer at the factory "Kartolitografii" GAPU, where he was viewed positively by his colleagues. From August 1965 to July 1966 he worked at a laboratory for the film and photo department of the Ministry of Internal Affairs. From January 1967 to January 1968 he worked as a photographic engineer at an oncology and chemical research facility but was fired for violating labour discipline.

From 1 February to 23 February 1968, he worked as a chauffeur at the motor depot of the Moscow Post Office. From February to May 1968, he had no permanent job and survived by doing odd jobs. Until 14 May, he worked at the Moscow Children's Distribution Receiver of the UOOP of the Moscow Executive Committee, as the head of the darkroom operations.

== Murders ==
At the end of December 1963, the 25-year-old Boris Gusakov launched his first attack on a girl at the Moscow Institute of History and Archives. He was unsuccessful, however, as the victim resisted and broke free. When the child ran out into a yard, an outfit of the Komsomol fighting squad tried to detain the attacker, but he disappeared. At that time, it was suggested that the attack was carried out by another killer: Vladimir Ionesyan, the "Mosgaz" killer, who operated in Moscow in late 1963.

On 21 June 1964, in the Tomilinsky Forest Park located in the Lyuberetsky District, Gusakov committed his first murder. He raped and killed 11-year-old Valya Scherbakova, striking her several times on the head with a blunt object. On 4 September 1965, Gusakov raped and killed his second victim, a student named Yanova, again in the Tomilinsky Forest Park. By 1968, when he began his new murder series, the cases of his first murders had been classified.

On 11 March 1968, Gusakov raped and killed two first-year female students, Olga Romanova and Elena Krasovskaya in the attic of the Moscow Power Engineering Institute. There he left the murder weapon - a scrap from a steel water pipe - with his fingerprints on it. It turned out that the last time the girls were seen was with their classmate Oleg Ryabkov, but his fingerprints did not match those found on the murder weapon. On the wall of the attic, an inscription addressed to the murders was found, mentioning an Igor and a Sergey. The investigators located the two young men mentioned, but their fingerprints did not coincide as well.

In April 1968, Gusakov killed another 9-year-old girl, attacking a couple afterwards. During the attack, he hit the man with a blunt object and then killed the woman. However, the man survived and was able to describe his attacker. Since both crimes were committed in the Lyuberetsky District, the detectives decided to investigate all similar attacks in recent years. They then discovered that the murders of Scherbakova and Yanova were committed by the same criminal, as well as the murders of the three girls in the spring of 1968.

== Arrest and conviction ==
On 16 May 1968, Gusakov met two tenth-grade girls in Serpukhov, Moscow Oblast, who he invited to go with him to the countryside. At first he tried to poison then kill them with a cleaver, but when Gusakov tried to attack the girls they escaped, where they alerted a nearby policeman who detained Gusakov.

In 1969, a court found Gusakov guilty of five murders and he was sentenced to death. Despite several requests for clemency which were all rejected, in 1970 Gusakov was executed by firing squad in Moscow.

== In the media ==
- The documentary film "Beauties and the Beast" from "The Investigation was conducted..." series, on NTV.

== See also ==
- List of Russian serial killers

== Bibliography ==
- Robert Kalman, Born to Kill in the USSR, FriesenPress, 2014, ISBN 9781460227305; Chapter 'Student hunter', pp. 53–59
- Alina Maximova - "Boris Gusakov, the Student Hunter"
