= Vladimir Ovsyannikov =

Russian politician

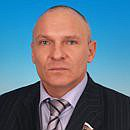

Vladimir Anatolevich Ovsyannikov (Russian: Влади́мир Анато́льевич Овся́нников, also transliterated as Vladimir Anatolyevich Ovsannikov; born 22 November 1961 in Chkalovsk) is a member of the Russian State Duma. He is a member of the State Duma's Committees on Defense. He is a member of the LDPR.

== Biography ==
He was born in 1961 in the city of Chkalovsk, Gorky Oblast (now Nizhny Novgorod Oblast).

He graduated from the All-Union Correspondence Law Institute in 1996.

He worked in the city administration of Prokopyevsk, Kemerovo Oblast.

As of 1999, he had not yet completed higher education.

In 1999, he became the head of the LDPR’s Kemerovo regional branch and received the status of State Duma deputy assistant.

In April 1999, he ran for election to the Council of People's Deputies of Kemerovo Oblast. The election was held on 18 April 1999, but Ovsyannikov did not win a mandate.

In May 1999, he ran for mayor of Prokopyevsk, but received only 4.74% of the votes cast.

In December 1999, during the State Duma elections, he ran as a candidate on the Zhirinovsky Bloc list. He was listed as number 4 in the Siberian regional group (after Loginov, Vishnyakov, and Krivelskaya). He was not elected.

In 2003, he was an assistant to Loginov, Yevgeny Yuryevich State Duma deputy Yevgeny Loginov.

In December 2003, he was elected a deputy of the Fourth convocation of the State Duma of the Russian Federation via the LDPR federal list. He joined the LDPR faction, served on the State Duma Committee on Defense (Russia), and was a member of the State Duma Commission on Budget Expenditures for Defense and State Security.

In 2004–2005, Ovsyannikov supported a businessman accused of storing counterfeit discs with computer games. When law enforcement attempted to search the warehouse, they discovered a sign posted reading: “Public Reception Office of State Duma Deputy Vladimir Ovsyannikov”. Ovsyannikov later submitted a parliamentary inquiry to the Prosecutor General’s Office of Russia about illegal investigation methods.

In 2006, he headed the LDPR's Omsk regional branch.

In 2007, he led the Omsk regional group of the LDPR's federal candidate list for the elections to the 5th State Duma.

In December 2007, he was elected to the 5th State Duma.

In February 2008, the State Duma terminated his powers based on his written resignation. Ovsyannikov stated this was due to a transfer to the position of Deputy Head of the LDPR Central Office. His mandate was transferred to Andrey Lebedev.

From 2008 to 2010, he was an assistant to Zhirinovsky, Vladimir Volfovich.

On 7 August 2010, he was elected coordinator (head) of the Novosibirsk regional branch of the LDPR and led the party list for the Legislative Assembly of Novosibirsk Oblast.

On 10 October 2010, he was elected a deputy to the Legislative Assembly of Novosibirsk Oblast. Soon after, he renounced the mandate and left his position as regional coordinator, citing a transfer to Krasnodar Krai.

From 2010 to 2011, he served as Chief of Staff of the LDPR faction in the State Duma and acting coordinator of the Krasnodar regional branch.

In December 2011, he was elected to the 6th State Duma.

He is currently a State Duma deputy, First Deputy Head of the LDPR faction, member of the Committee on Defense, member of the Supreme Council of the LDPR, and coordinator of the LDPR's Krasnodar regional branch.

On 7 June 2013, the LDPR announced its intention to nominate Vladimir Ovsyannikov for the office of Mayor of Moscow.

According to media reports, Ovsyannikov withdrew due to a sudden illness (massive heart attack).

In June 2013, he resigned his mandate. The vacant seat was transferred to Anatoly Sikorsky.
