= Yuri Volkov =

Soviet ice hockey player

Yuri Volkov (April 18, 1937 – May 17, 2016) was an ice hockey player who played in the Soviet Hockey League. He played for Krylya Sovetov Moscow and HC Dynamo Moscow. He was inducted into the Russian and Soviet Hockey Hall of Fame in 1963.
