= Andrey Bronitsyn =

Russian politician

Andrey Yuryevich Bronitsyn (Russian: Андрей Юрьевич Броницын; born December 20, 1972 in Cheboksary) is a member for the LDPR of the State Duma of Russia.

He graduated from the Chuvash State University and the Volgo-Vyatsk Academy of State Service. From 2001 to 2002, Bronitsyn was a deputy on the Cheboksary City Council. He is a member of the Presidium of the Chuvash Republic State Council, and has served as the chairman of its Committee on Local Government. Currently, Bronitsyn is a member of the State Duma's Committee on Federal Affairs and Regional Policy.

In 2010, he was elected head of the city of Shumerlya. He was forced to resign in 2011 due to a corruption scandal.

In 2015, he ran in the election for Head of the Chuvash Republic, nominated by the Chuvash branch of the Civil Initiative party.

In the summer of 2016, he was convicted under Part 1 of Article 286 of the Criminal Code of the Russian Federation and, by a combined sentence, was given a three-year suspended sentence with a probation period by the Shumerlya District Court.

In accordance with the amnesty act marking the 70th anniversary of Victory in the Great Patriotic War, he was released from the imposed sentence, but was required to pay a fine of over 1.5 million rubles.
