= Albert Makashov =

Russian military officer and politician (born 1938)

- Альберт Макашов
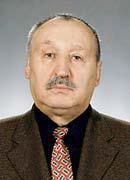
- Makashov c. 2004

Member of the State Duma
- In office 29 December 2003 – 24 December 2007
- In office 17 December 1995 – 18 January 2000

People's Deputy of the Soviet Union
- In office 25 May 1989 – 2 January 1992

Personal details
- Born: Albert Mikhailovich Makashov; June 12, 1938 (age 88) Levaya Rossosh, Voronezh Oblast, Russian SFSR, Soviet Union
- Citizenship: Russia
- Party: Communist Party of the Russian Federation; Movement in Support of the Army
- Known for: Commander of the Ural Military District (1989-1991)

Colonel General Albert Mikhailovich Makashov (Russian: Альберт Михайлович Макашóв; born 12 June 1938) is a Russian officer and a nationalist-communist politician.

== Biography ==
Makashov was born in Levaya Rossosh, Voronezh Oblast. He graduated from the Tashkent Higher Combined Arms Command School, finished the M. V. Frunze Military Academy (with the gold medal), and the General Staff Academy (with the gold medal) during the 1960s. He became major general of the Red Army in 1979, serving in the Caucasus region.

In 1989, Makashov was elected to the Supreme Soviet. He ran in the 1991 presidential election as an "independent nationalist", obtaining 3.74%. He then supported the Soviet coup d'état attempt that took place later in the same year. During the October crisis of 1993 he was in charge of the defense of the White House. He organized a people army and militia which, on 3 October, stormed the police cordons, seized the Moscow Mayor's office and attempted to seize the Ostankino Tower.

After the rebellion was suppressed, Makashov and a number of other opposition figures were arrested. After the imprisonment and amnesty in 1994, he was elected a deputy to the State Duma as a member of the Communist Party of the Russian Federation (since 1995).

=== 1991 presidential campaign ===
Makashov ran in the 1991 Russian presidential election. His running mate was Alexey Sergeyev (who had originally been running for president himself).

Having made a name for himself after strongly attacking perestroika at the 1990 RSFSR Party Congress, calls for Mashakov to run for president arose in mid-May. Demonstrators at a May 10, 1991 pro-Stalin demonstration in Moscow organized by the conservative movement Yedinstvo were reported by the media to have called for Mashakov to run. Several military units in Central Russia endorsed him as a candidate.

On May 14, 1991, Makashov announced that he would run for president.

Makashov declared his goal as president would be to preserve Russia as a power by insuring that it be strong and wealthy. He promised that would fight for the preservation of a strong Soviet Union and its armed forces. He also promised that to restore law and order to Russian society. He opposed the privatization of Russian industries, arguing that enterprises should instead be placed under the control of worker collectives. He additionally proposed changing the RSFSR's political system so that its parliament and its local soviets would be elected by workers' collectives rather than through popular elections.

Considered to be a hard-liner, during his campaign Makashov publicly exchanged heated debate with reformers such as Aleksandr Yakovlev. He also attacked liberal media, accusing them of distributing anti-military propaganda. Makashov's campaign politics were characterized as neo-Stalinist. He was considered to be a military zealot.

Mashakov's campaign appealed to a core base of neo-Stalinists. His candidacy received the backing of neo-Stalinist Nina Andreyeva.

Two of the groups which Makashov intended to focus on getting the votes of were military personnel and "patriotic" Russians. A third group he intended to focus on were members of the workforce who were worried by Yeltsin's economic proposals (aka privatization and shock therapy). In order to appeal to this third group, Makashov's campaign repeatedly referenced "social defense" in the transition to a market economy.

=== Accusations of antisemitism ===
Jewish associations and a number of commentators have accused Makashov of being antisemitic. According to a report produced by the Anti-Defamation League and the National Conference on Soviet Jewry, Makashov "has become infamous worldwide for his anti-Semitic outbursts blaming Jews for the country's economic problems, and advocating the establishment of a quota on the number of Jews allowed in Russia." The Jewish Week stated that Makashov "has long revelled in unabashed anti-Jewish rhetoric".

Makashov was accused of appearing on TV to "advocate the extinction of the 'Zhyds', and he promised to take at least 10 Zhyds with him into the next world." According to Alexander Saley, a communist deputy from Tatarstan and ally of Makashov, "He was misquoted. [He] was quite specific in addressing specific people but the media put it in a more general way. Among Makashov's closest friends are quite a few Jews." After the general's call for expulsion of all Jews at a public meeting in 1999, there were attempts to prosecute him for hate speech; the newspaper Kommersant ran an article about him named "Makashov — Zoological Antisemite". David Duke, who visited Moscow in 1999, met Makashov and expressed his support for the General.

Makashov was among the signatories of the "Letter of 5000", which was described as "an appeal to the prosecutor general urging him to review the activity of all Jewish organizations in Russia due to their alleged extremism" against non-Jews. The open letter was published in January 2005 in Rus Pravoslavnaya, a Russian Orthodox newspaper. Amongst the 500 signatures, Makashov was among 19 members of the State Duma (five from the Communist Party, and 14 from the Rodina Party). Makashov defended the letter in an appearance on a televised debate show hosted by Vladimir Solovyov on 3 February 2005; 53 percent of the more than 100,000 viewers who called the station maintained that Makashov got the better of his debate opponent— Alexei Leonov— who denounced Makashov for ethnic incitement.
