= Kratovo, Russia =

Kratovo Кра́тово
- Urban-type settlement
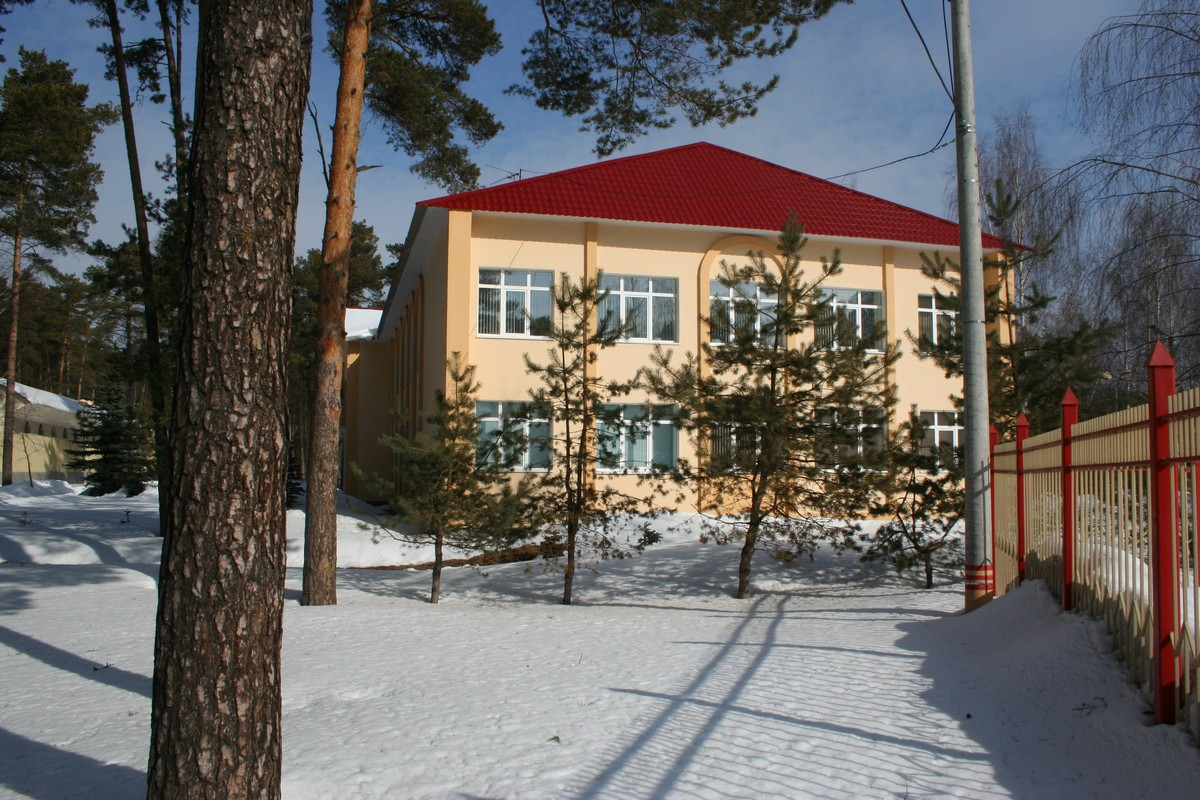

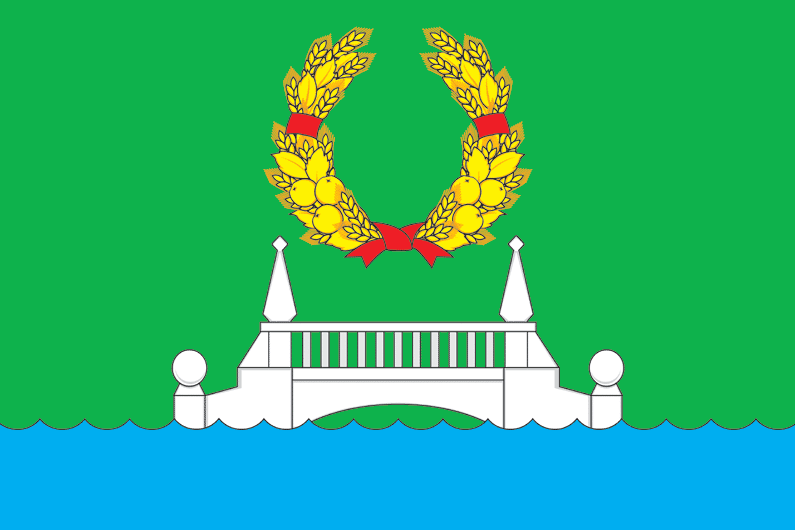
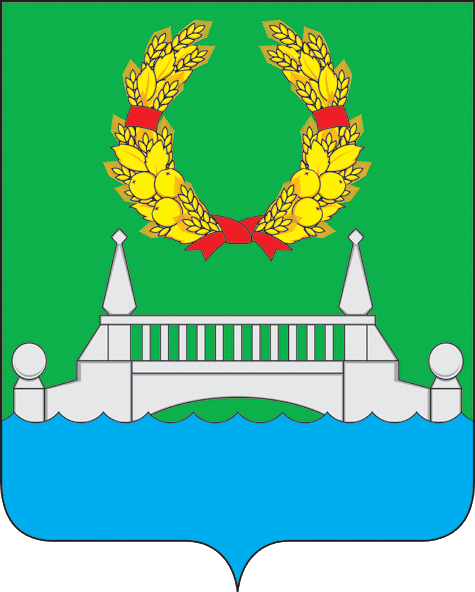
- Flag Coat of arms
- Interactive map of Kratovo
- Location of Kratovo Kratovo (Moscow Oblast)
- Coordinates: 55°36′N 38°09′E
- Country: Russia
- Federal subject: Moscow Oblast
- Administrative district: Ramensky District
- Founded: 1898

Population (2010 Census)
  - Total: 8,277
  - Estimate (2025): 15,865 (+91.7%)
- Demonym: Kratovian
- Time zone: UTC+3 (MSK)
- Postal code: 140130
- OKTMO ID: 46648157051

Kratovo (Russian: Кра́тово) is an urban locality (a suburban (dacha) settlement) in Ramensky District of Moscow Oblast, Russia, located 40 kilometers (25 mi) southeast of Moscow. Population: 8,277 (2010 census); 6,855 (2002 census); 6,295 (1989 Soviet census).

Zoe Williams of The Guardian wrote that Kratovo "resembles a Russian Guildford with high hedges, gigantic trees, the careful, botanical planning of expensive privacy." and that the locality "has a reputation for being full of former KGB safe houses, though I couldn’t find one Moscovite who would vouch for that."

== History ==
On 10 June 2017, a 50-year-old man opened fire on passers-by in the settlement, killing five people.

== Notable people ==
Yuriy Borzakovskiy, who won gold in the men's 800-meter race at the 2004 Summer Olympics in Athens, was born in Kratovo. Sergei Eisenstein and Sergei Prokofiev had dachas here, and Soviet dissident Valeriya Novodvorskaya also spent time in a rented dacha here.

George Blake, a famous Cold War spy, lived in a dacha in Kratovo as well as State Duma member Viktor Ilyukhin.
