= Lyubov Blizhina =

Russian politician

Lyubov Fedorovna Blizhina (Russian: Любовь Федоровна Ближина, also transliterated Lubov; born June 11, 1947) is a member of the State Duma for the LDPR. She is a member of the Committee on Cultural affairs of the State Duma. She graduated from the Tambov branch of the Moscow Institute for the Soviet Culture.

State Duma Deputy

In 2003, she ran for the 4th State Duma as a candidate from the LDPR, listed as number 5 in the Volga regional group of the party’s federal list. She was elected and joined the State Duma Committee on Culture.

In 2007, she ran for the 5th State Duma from the LDPR as the lead candidate in Regional Group No. 41 (Republic of Mordovia), but was not elected.
