= Shamil Sultanov =

Russian politician (1952–2022)

Member of the State Duma
- In office 7 December 2003 – 24 December 2007

Personal details
- Born: Shamil Zagitovich Sultanov; 16 May 1952 Andijan, Uzbek SSR, Soviet Union
- Died: 18 February 2022 (aged 69)
- Party: Rodina
- Education: Moscow State Institute of International Relations

Shamil Zagitovich Sultanov (Russian: Султанов, Шамиль Загитович; 16 May 1952 – 18 February 2022) was a Russian politician. A member of Rodina, he served in the State Duma from 2003 to 2007. He died on 18 February 2022, at the age of 69.
