= Lev Rokhlin =

Russian lieutenant general and politician

- Лев Рохлин
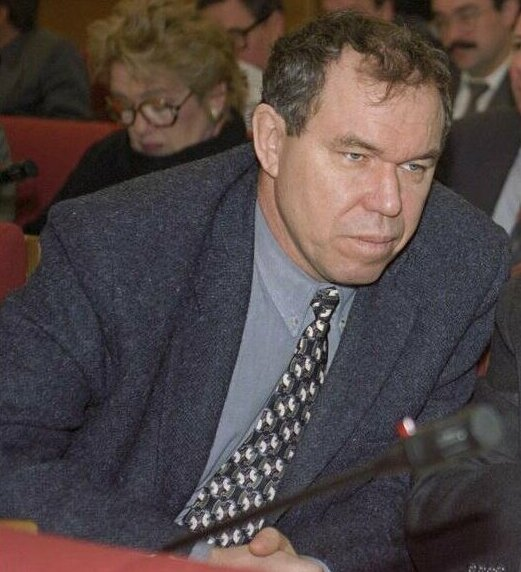
- Rokhlin in 1996

Member of the State Duma
- In office 16 January 1996 – 3 July 1998
- Constituency: Our Home – Russia, party list

Personal details
- Born: 6 June 1947 Aralsk, Kazakh SSR, Soviet Union (now Kazakhstan)
- Died: 3 July 1998 (aged 51) Klokovo, Moscow Oblast, Russia
- Cause of death: Murder
- Party: Our Home – Russia (1995)
- Other political affiliations: Movement in Support of the Army
- Spouse: Tamara Pavlovna Rokhlina
- Children: 2
- Education: Frunze Military Academy; Military Academy of the General Staff
- Awards: Order of the Red Banner

Military service
- Allegiance: Soviet Union; Russia
- Years of service: 1970–1995
- Rank: Lieutenant general
- Unit: Group of Soviet Forces in Germany; 860th Motor Rifle Regiment; 191st Motor Rifle Regiment
- Commands: 152nd Motor Rifle Division; 75th Motor Rifle Division; 8th Guard Corps
- Battles/wars: Soviet–Afghan War; First Nagorno-Karabakh War; First Chechen War; Battle of Grozny

Lev Yakovlevich Rokhlin (Russian: Лев Яковлевич Рохлин; 6 June 1947 – 3 July 1998) was a Kazakh-born Russian lieutenant general and politician who served as a member of the State Duma from 1995 until his murder in 1998. Rokhlin reached the top of the Russian military, quickly rising through the ranks during and after the Soviet–Afghan War. After the Soviet Union dissolved, he served as a commander of Russian forces during the First Chechen War. Later, he started a political career and became a member of the Russian State Duma and chairman of the State Duma's Defense Committee.

== Early life and education ==
Lev Rokhlin was the youngest of three children in the family of World War II veteran and dissident Yakov Lvovich Rokhlin. In 1948, eight months after the birth of his son, Yakov was arrested and apparently died in a Gulag prison. Lev's mother, Ksenia Ivanovna Goncharova, brought up three children alone.

Ten years later the Rokhlin family moved to Tashkent. Rokhlin studied there at school #19 in Old Town. After he graduated, he worked at the Tashkent Aviation Production Association, then was drafted into the army.

In 1970 he graduated from the Tashkent Higher Military Command School with honors, then served in the Group of Soviet Forces in Germany in Wurzen. Then he studied at the Frunze Military Academy, and after completing his studies served in the Arctic and in the Leningrad, Turkestan, Transcaucasian Military Districts, as deputy commander of a corps.

== Later service ==
From 1982 to 1984 he served in Afghanistan, initially as commander of the 860th Motor Rifle Regiment at Fayzabad, Badakhshan. In June 1983 he was removed from this position after a failed operation and appointed deputy commander of the 191st Motor Rifle Regiment in Ghazni. But in less than a year he was reappointed to his previous position. He was wounded twice, and the second time was evacuated to Tashkent.

He graduated from the Military Academy of the General Staff with honors.

In March 1987 Rokhlin was appointed commander of the 152nd Motor Rifle Division, 31st Army Corps, in Kutaisi, a cadre division.

In November 1988 Rokhlin became commander of the 75th Motor Rifle Division of the 4th Army in Nakhchivan. In early 1990 the division was transferred to the Soviet Border Troops of the KGB, and Rokhlin was promoted to major general in February of the same year.

In 1993, he became the head of Russia's 8th Guard Corps at Volgograd (formerly Stalingrad), at the rank of lieutenant general, the only Jew to reach such a rank in Russia since World War II.

Of the prevalent corruption at the time, he later said:

"I realised what was happening and the way life was - the corruption, first of all. I saw people from my own garrison collecting scrap metal and taking scrap metal from aircraft from Chechnya to buy 12 flats for officers; I saw them stealing six hundred, six thousand, millions of dollars. I had not imagined that this could happen. Of course I was upset... I just saw the way things were more and more, and I tried to fight it."

During the First Chechen War, Rokhlin was credited with reorganizing the Russian forces in Chechnya and finally taking the Chechen capital of Grozny in 1995. Frustrated with the bloodshed, he left the army a few weeks later. He refused to accept the state's highest medal and the title of Hero of the Russian Federation for leading the Grozny offensive, saying "It's immoral to seek glory in a civil war for commanders. For Russia, the Chechen war has none of glory, but all of tragedy".

== Political career ==
After he retired in 1995, Rokhlin was elected to the Duma (Russian parliament) as a member of the pro-Boris Yeltsin party Our Home – Russia, from which he later resigned. Rokhlin chaired the Duma's Defense Committee until President Yeltsin made an agreement with the Communist Party of the Russian Federation to strip him of the post. In 1997, Rokhlin formed the Movement in Support of the Army, which blamed Yeltsin for the war in Chechnya and for low morale in the military, unsuccessfully sought to organize serving and retired servicemen into a political force that could oust Yeltsin from office.

== Death ==
On 3 July 1998, a few months after he tried to stage an anti-government mass protest by army servicemen, Lev Rokhlin was shot in the head in his bed while he was sleeping. He was pronounced dead at the scene. His wife, Tamara, who at first had briefly confessed to the killing "due to a hostile relationship", was convicted by a Russian court for her husband's murder in 2005, but she continued to insist he was killed by a group of masked men who broke into their dacha. She was given a suspended sentence of 4–5 years.

Three burned corpses were found in a windbreak near the scene of the crime. According to officials, they were killed some time before the murder of the general, and had nothing to do with that. But many of Rokhlin's colleagues thought that they were the real assassins, liquidated by the Kremlin's special service. According to Alexander Litvinenko (assassinated 2006), former KGB and FSB general Anatoly Trofimov (shot dead in 2005) told him that the murder appeared to be organized by Russian secret services.

== See also ==
- List of unsolved murders (1980–1999)
- List of members of the State Duma of Russia who died in office
