= Ivan Musatov =

Russian politician (born 1976)

Ivan Musatov MP
- Иван Мусатов
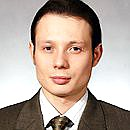
- State Duma portrait from the 4th convocation

Member of the State Duma (Party List Seat)
- Incumbent
- Assumed office 12 October 2021
- In office 29 December 2003 – 24 December 2007

Personal details
- Born: 14 February 1976 (age 50) Rakvere, Estonia
- Party: Liberal Democratic Party of Russia
- Children: 0
- Parent: Mikhail Musatov (father)
- Education: Moscow Higher Combined Arms Command School; Financial University
- Religion: Russian Orthodox

Ivan Mikhailovich Musatov (Russian: Иван Михайлович Мусатов; born 14 February 1976) is a Russian politician and deputy of the 8th State Duma, serving since the 2021 Russian legislative election. Previously, he served as a deputy of the 4th State Duma. He is a member of the populist oriented Liberal Democratic Party of Russia (LDPR).

== Biography ==
Musatov was born to a military family on 14 February 1976 in Rakvere, Estonia, then occupied by the Soviet Union. His father was Mikhail Ivanovich Musatov, a Russian politician who served continuously as a deputy of the State Duma from 1995 to 2011 and also belonged to the LDPR. Musatov grew up in Belarus, moving with his family to Moscow in 1985. He studied engineering as a cadet at the Moscow Higher Combined Arms Command School, graduating in 1997 with academic honors. He then received a master's of economics from the Finance Academy under the Government of the Russian Federation in 1999, and a law degree in 2003.

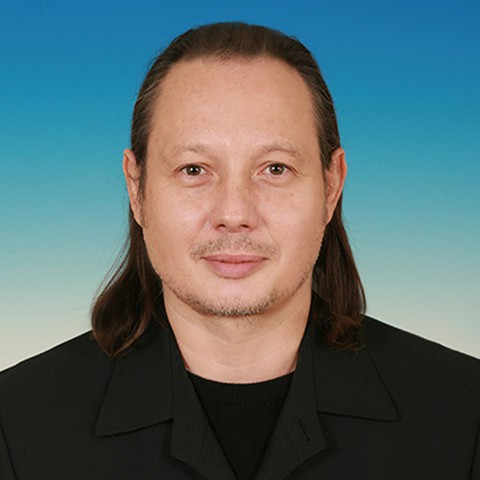
official portrait, circa 2021

In 2003 he was elected as a deputy to the 4th convocation of the Russian State Duma. As a member, he served on the Security Committee. In 2007, he was renominated by the LDPR, but failed to secure another seat. He was again elected in 2021, and returned to the State Duma, becoming a member of the Committee on Culture chaired by Yelena Yampolskaya.

On 24 March 2022, the United States Treasury sanctioned him in response to the Russian invasion of Ukraine.
