= Anatoly Starkov =

Soviet cyclist

Personal information
- Born: 15 October 1946 (age 79) Kharkiv, Ukrainian SSR, Soviet Union
- Height: 1.74 m (5 ft 9 in)
- Weight: 73 kg (161 lb)

Sport
- Sport: Cycling
- Club: Dynamo Kyiv

Anatoly Yefremovich Starkov (Ukrainian: Анатолій Єфремович Старков; Russian: Анатолий Ефремович Старков; born 15 October 1946) is a retired Soviet cyclist. He competed in the individual road race at the 1968 and 1972 Summer Olympics and finished in 35th place in 1972.

Starkov won one stage at the 1967 Tour of Britain; he also won one stage at the 1971 Peace Race, overall finishing in third place individually and in first place with the Soviet team. In 1972, he was third in the Tour du Maroc.
