= Alexei Kondaurov =

Former KGB general (born 1949)

- Occupations: general, politician

Alexei Kondaurov (born 1949) is a former KGB general, former Head Analyst at Yukos, and former member of Russia's State Duma for the Communist Party between 2003 and 2007. Asked about the fact that he is both a Communist and a millionaire, Kondaurov stated "There's no contradiction. Engels was an oligarch and Lenin hardly a vagabond."
