= Alexander Krutov =

Russian journalist and politician

Alexander Nikolayevich Krutov (Russian: Александр Николаевич Крутов; born 13 October 1947) is a Russian journalist and politician, a member of the State Duma (2003–2007). His party affiliation was Rodina (Motherland), and he held the positions of Deputy Chairman of the Committee on Information Policy and is a member of the Commission on the Credentials and Deputies' Ethics Issues in the Duma. He is known for his nationalist and antisemitic views.

== Short biography and political views ==
Born in 1947, Alexander Krutov graduated from the journalism department of the Moscow State University. For many years he worked as a field correspondent for the Soviet Radio. In 1986, he was the first journalist to broadcast the consequences of Chernobyl’s catastrophe. He occupied various positions in the central TV and radio broadcasting companies. In 1990, Alexander Krutov served as people’s deputy, and from 1997 to 2000 he was named General Director of Moscoviya, a TV and radio broadcasting company. He is also the host of the TV program Russian House and the main editor of the monthly magazine, Russian House. Alexander Krutov is married and has one son. In 2005, he was one of the radical nationalist Russian politicians who demanded the prohibition of "all religious and ethnic Jewish organizations as extremist."
