= Ilya Yelizarov =

Russian politician

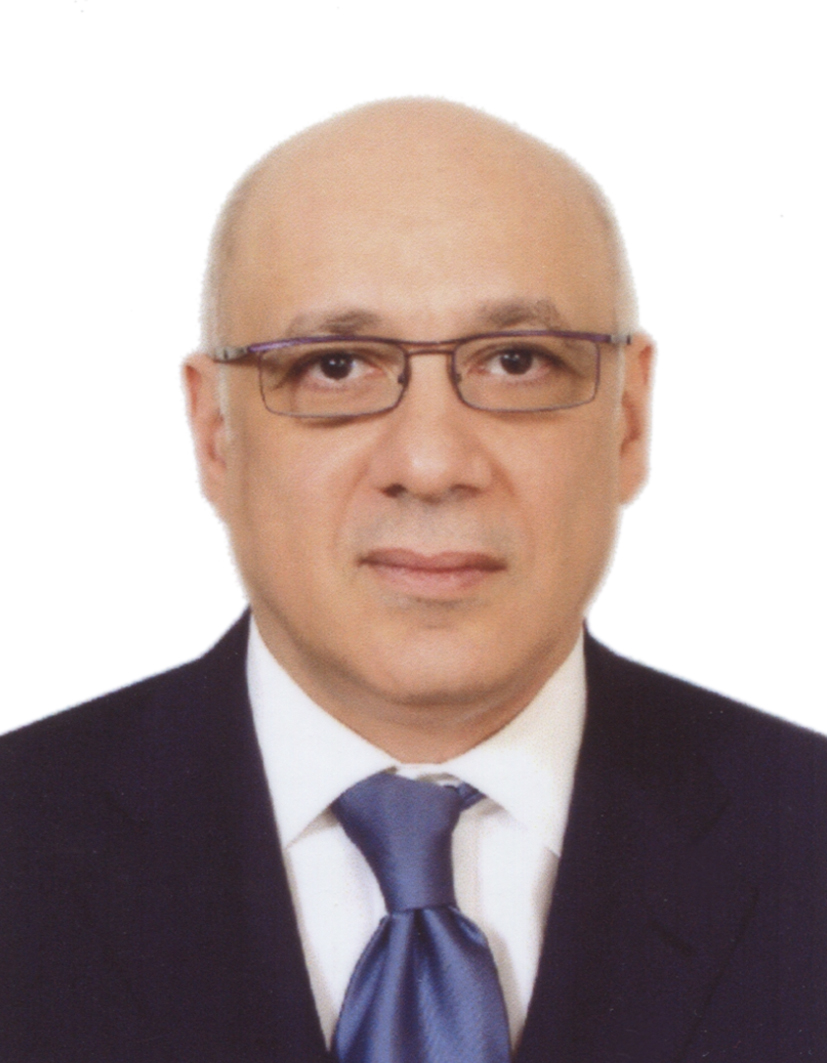
Ilya Yelizarov

Ilya Yelizarovich Yelizarov (Russian: Илья Елизарович Елизаров; born January 27, 1963) is a Russian statesman and a member of the State Duma of Russia. He is a member of the State Duma's Committee on Economic Policy, Entrepreneurship and Tourism. He is a jurist; before service in the State Duma, Yelizarov was deputy editor-in-chief of the journal Zakon i Pravo ("Law and Order").

He has the federal state civilian service rank of 1st class Active State Councillor of the Russian Federation.

== Career ==
1994–2000 — Vice President of the Closed Joint-Stock Company “International Banking Union.”

2000–2003 — Deputy Editor-in-Chief for Economic Affairs at the publishing house and journal Law and Justice.

2003–2007 — Deputy of the State Duma of the Russian Federation (representing the LDPR faction), Deputy Chairman of the State Duma Committee on Property.

2008–2010 — Advisor to the Chairman of the Federation Council of the Federal Assembly of the Russian Federation, Sergey Mironov.

2010–2012 — Assistant to the Chief of Staff of the Presidential Administration of the Russian Federation.

Since 2012 — Assistant to the Prime Minister of the Russian Federation, Dmitry Medvedev.
