= Dimitri Gusakov =

Russian politician

Dimitri Vyacheslavovich Gusakov (Russian: Дми́трий Вячесла́вович Гусако́в, also transliterated Dmitri, Dmitry, or Dimitry; born February 15, 1971) is a member for the LDPR of the State Duma of Russia. He is a member of the State Duma's Committee on Manufacturing, Construction, Science and Technology. He has attended St. Petersburg State University. He has a degree in philosophy.

== Biography ==
After graduating with honors from the Faculty of Philosophy of Saint Petersburg State University in 1993, Dmitry Gusakov worked for the Arkhangelsk newspaper “Vecherniy Zvon”, where he served as editor-in-chief.

In 1991, Gusakov joined the Liberal Democratic Party of Russia (LDPR) — holding party membership card No. 3 — and began an active political career. He later became the head of the LDPR's Arkhangelsk regional organization. In 1996, he ran for the Arkhangelsk City Council, but failed to win a seat.

In 1995, Gusakov was the victim of an assassination attempt — an unknown assailant attacked him and struck him three times in the head with an axe. Despite sustaining severe injuries, he survived and soon returned to political and public work.

From 1998 to 1999, he worked in the Administrative Office of the Arkhangelsk Regional Administration. In 1999, after graduating from the North-West Academy of Public Administration, he was appointed Head of the LDPR Central Office for Northwest Russia. That same year, he founded and led the Arkhangelsk Regional Public Employment and Social Support Fund for the Unemployed “Dostoinstvo” (“Dignity”).

In 2000, Gusakov became First Deputy Head of the LDPR Central Office, received the status of a member of the LDPR Supreme Council, and in 2001 was appointed Chairman of the LDPR Central Control Commission.

Also in 2001, he was elected a deputy of the Arkhangelsk City Council. He served on the Commission on Culture, Sports, and Mass Media, which was chaired by his brother, Yury Gusakov.

In 2003, he was elected to the Fourth State Duma of the Russian Federation as a representative of the Liberal Democratic Party of Russia (LDPR). He was a member of the LDPR faction, served on the State Duma Committee on Culture, and participated in the State Duma Commission on the Review of Federal Budget Expenditures for National Defense and State Security. After his term ended, Gusakov withdrew from active political life.

He authored a textbook on electoral technologies titled “The Science of Winning, Zhirinovsky-Style”.

Dmitry Gusakov was an advocate for preserving the cultural heritage and history of Russia's North. For example, at his own expense, he installed a memorial plaque at the Konosha railway station (Arkhangelsk region) commemorating the exile of future Nobel laureate Joseph Brodsky to the Konosha district of Arkhangelsk Oblast.

Dmitry Gusakov died on January 15, 2014, at the First City Hospital in Arkhangelsk after a long illness[^4]. He was buried in Arkhangelsk at the Kuznechevskoye (Vologodskoye) Cemetery.

== Family ==
Mother — Zinaida Solomonovna Gusakova (born 1941).

Brother — Yury Vyacheslavovich Gusakov (born April 5, 1963) — Russian politician, deputy of the Arkhangelsk Regional Assembly of Deputies (4th convocation) and the Arkhangelsk City Council, and former Minister of Agriculture of Arkhangelsk Oblast
