= Mikhail Musatov =

Russian politician (1950–2022)

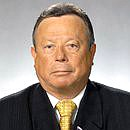

Deputy of State Duma of Russia
- In office 17 January 1996 – 21 December 2011

Personal details
- Born: 23 August 1950 Chambarak, Armenian SSR, USSR
- Died: 13 December 2022 (aged 72)
- Party: Liberal Democratic Party of Russia
- Children: Ivan Musatov

Mikhail Ivanovich Musatov (Russian: Михаил Иванович Мусатов; 23 August 1950 – 13 December 2022) was a Russian politician who was a deputy of the State Duma from 1995. He was a member of the Liberal Democratic Party of Russia, and was Deputy Chairman of the State Duma's Committee on Defense. Prior to his election to the State Duma, Musatov was LDPR chairman for Moscow. He held doctorates in the fields of politics and law. His son, Ivan Musatov, is also a deputy of the State Duma.

Musatov died on 13 December 2022, at the age of 72.
