= Alexander Gurov (politician) =

Russian politician

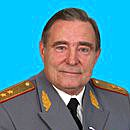

Member of the State Duma
- In office 18 January 2000 – 21 December 2011

Personal details
- Born: 17 November 1945 Staroyuryevsky District, Russian SFSR, Soviet Union
- Party: United Russia
- Other political affiliations: Unity
- Education: Moscow State University
- Occupation: Police officer, politician

Military service
- Branch/service: Ministry of Internal Affairs
- Rank: Lieutenant general

Alexandr Ivanovich Gurov (Militsiya Lt. Gen., Professor) (Russian: Александр Иванович Гуров; born November 17, 1945, in Tambov Oblast) is a Russian politician and previously a Soviet Militsiya detective in the 1980s who made his name researching Soviet organized crime and commenting on it for the media.

On July 25, 1973, Junior Lieutenant of the Police Alexander Gurov shot and killed the Berberov family's pet lion, King, who was at the time participating in the filming of Unbelievable Adventures of Italians in Russia at the time, after it attacked a person.

In 1999, he co-founded the pro-government Unity Party of Russia. Since 1999, Gurov has been a member of the State Duma, its Unity and United Russia factions, and Committee for Security.

== Awards ==
- Order of Honour
- Order of Friendship
- Medal "For Distinction in Military Service"
- Jubilee Medal "Twenty Years of Victory in the Great Patriotic War 1941–1945"
- Jubilee Medal "300 Years of the Russian Navy"
- Medal "In Commemoration of the 850th Anniversary of Moscow"
- Medal "In Commemoration of the 300th Anniversary of Saint Petersburg"
- Medal "Veteran of Labour"
- Medal "For Impeccable Service"
- Honoured Lawyer

== Sources ==
- Раззаков, Ф. И. (2012), "Расстрелянные звезды", Их погасили на пике славы, Moscow: Эксмо, ISBN 9785699556038, archived from the original on 2013-06-30
