= Committee on International Affairs of the State Duma =

Committee on International Affairs of the State Duma Комитет Государственной Думы по международным делам Komitet Gosudarstvennoj Dumy po mezhdunarodnym delam
- State Duma
- Established: 12 December 1993; 32 years ago

Leadership
- Chairman: Pyotr Tolstoy, United Russia

Meeting place
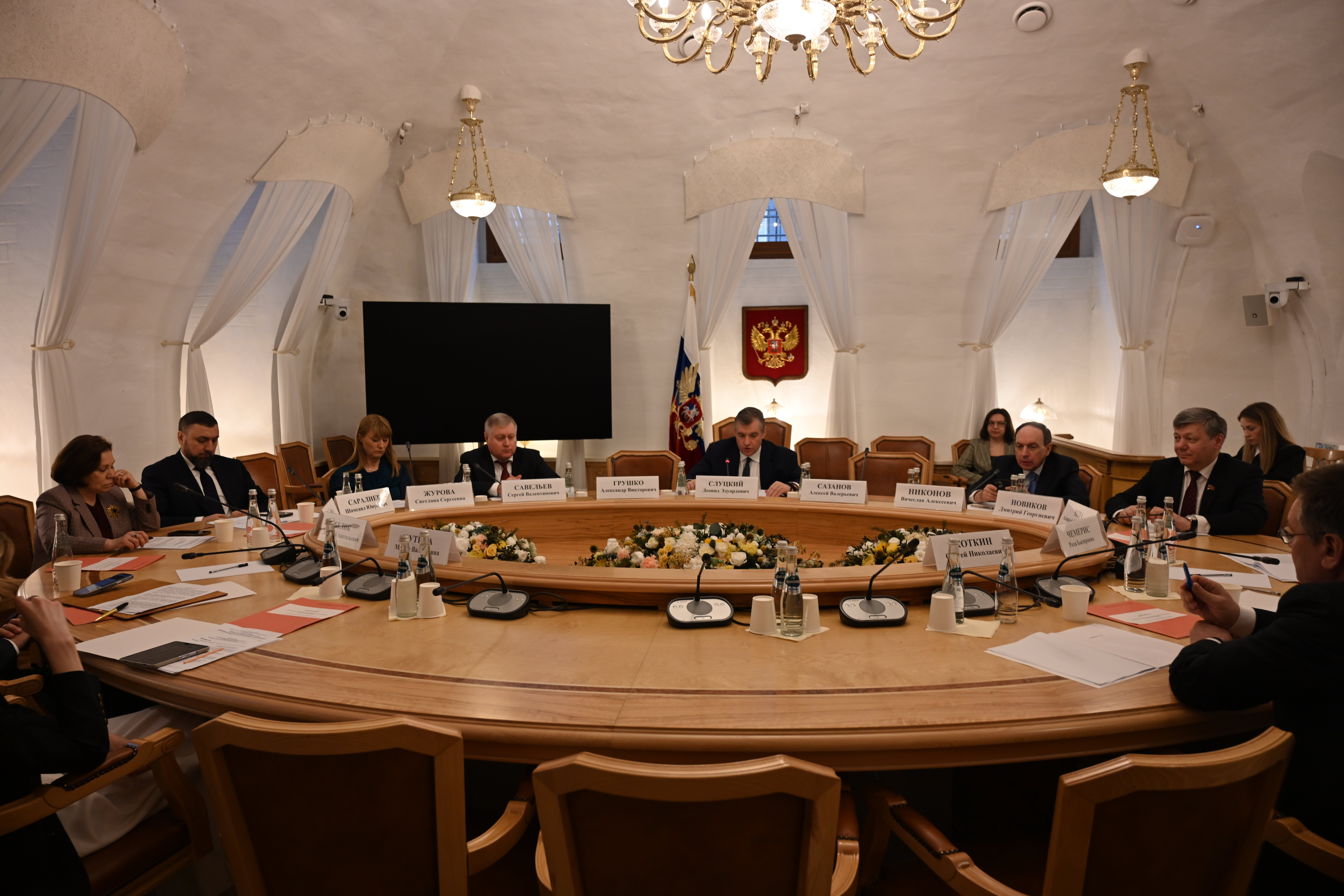
- State Duma building 1 Okhotny Ryad Street, Moscow

Website
- interkomitet.com

The Committee on International Affairs of the State Duma (Russian: Комитет Государственной Думы по международным делам) is a committee of the State Duma, the lower house of Russia's Federal Assembly.

The Committee carries out activities in the field of implementation of Russia's foreign policy, international contacts of the State Duma, work in interparliamentary structures, and relations with parliaments of other states. The Committee checks the international treaties subject to ratification and gives its conclusion, after which the draft treaties are put to the vote of the State Duma. Also, the Committee considers candidates proposed by the Russian President for the posts of ambassadors to foreign countries and international organizations and makes its recommendations regarding their appointment to the proposed positions.

== Membership ==
Members of the Committee in the 9th State Duma:

Member	Constituency	Position	Faction	Notes
Pyotr Tolstoy	Lyublino No.198 (ER)	Chair of the Committee	United Russia	
Andrey Klimov	United Russia party list	First Deputy Chair of the Committee	United Russia	
Sergey Kozlov	LDPR party list	First Deputy Chair of the Committee	LDPR	
Dmitry Novikov	CPRF party list	First Deputy Chair of the Committee	CPRF	
Shamsail Saraliev	United Russia party list	First Deputy Chair of the Committee	United Russia	
Dmitry Savelyev	Central No.138 (ER)	First Deputy Chair of the Committee	United Russia	
Aleksandr Vorobyov	A Just Russia party list	First Deputy Chair of the Committee	A Just Russia	
Vyacheslav Nikonov	United Russia party list	Deputy Chair of the Committee	United Russia	
Sergey Vlasov	New People party list	Deputy Chair of the Committee	New People	
Svetlana Zhurova	Vsevolozhsk No.112 (ER)	Deputy Chair of the Committee	United Russia	
Sholban Kara-ool	United Russia party list	Deputy Chair of the Committee	United Russia	since October 2026
Nikolai Brykin	Tyumen No.183 (ER)	Member of the Committee	United Russia	
Denis Kravchenko	Dmitrov No.119 (ER)	Member of the Committee	United Russia	
Zelimkhan Mutsoev	Pervouralsk No.174 (ER)	Member of the Committee	United Russia	
Irina Rodnina	United Russia party list	Member of the Committee	United Russia	until October 2026
Leonid Slutsky	LDPR party list	Member of the Committee	LDPR	
Valentina Tereshkova	United Russia party list	Member of the Committee	United Russia	
Bekkhan Agayev	United Russia party list	Member of the Committee	United Russia	since October 2026
Aleksandr Nikitin	United Russia party list	Member of the Committee	United Russia	since October 2026

== Chairs ==
Duma	Chair	Took office	Left office	Political Party	Ref.
1st	Vladimir Lukin (1937–)	17 January 1994	17 January 1996	Yabloko	
2nd	Vladimir Lukin (1937–)	17 January 1996	19 January 2000	Yabloko	
3rd	Dmitry Rogozin (1963–)	19 January 2000	16 January 2004	People's Deputy Group	
4th	Konstantin Kosachev (1962–)	16 January 2004	24 December 2007	United Russia	
5th	Konstantin Kosachev (1962–)	24 December 2007	21 December 2011	United Russia	
6th	Aleksey Pushkov (1954–)	21 December 2011	5 October 2016	United Russia	
7th	Leonid Slutsky (1968–)	5 October 2016	12 October 2021	Liberal Democratic Party	
8th	Leonid Slutsky (1968–)	12 October 2021	30 September 2026	Liberal Democratic Party	
9th	Pyotr Tolstoy (1969–)	30 September 2026	Incumbent	United Russia	

== Past membership ==
=== 1st State Duma ===
Member	Constituency	Position	Faction	Notes
Vladimir Lukin	Odintsovo No.111 (YaBL)	Chairman of the Committee	Yabloko	
Oleg Bogomolov	DPR party list	Deputy Chairman of the Committee	DPR	
Aleksey Mitrofanov	LDPR party list	Deputy Chairman of the Committee	LDPR	
Aleksandra Ochirova	Ingushetia No.12 (Ind.)	Deputy Chairwoman of the Committee	NRP (until April 1995)	
Aleksandra Ochirova	Ingushetia No.12 (Ind.)	Deputy Chairwoman of the Committee	Russia (since April 1995)	
Vladimir Averchev	YaBL party list	Secretary of the Committee	Yabloko	
Yevgeny Ambartsumov	YaBL party list	Member of the Committee	Yabloko	resigned in June 1994
Nadezhda Bikalova	Cheboksary No.34 (Ind.)	Member of the Committee	NRP	until May 1994
Sergei Mavrodi	Mytishchi No.109 (Ind.)	Member of the Committee	Unaffiliated	since October 1994 expelled in October 1995
Tatyana Chertoritskaya	Semyonov No.121 (Ind.)	Member of the Committee	Unaffiliated (until March 1995)	since February 1995
Tatyana Chertoritskaya	Semyonov No.121 (Ind.)	Member of the Committee	Stability (since March 1995)	since February 1995
Subcommittee on Arms Control and International Security
Vyacheslav Nikonov	PRES party list	Chairman of the Subcommittee	PRES (until October 1995)	
Vyacheslav Nikonov	PRES party list	Chairman of the Subcommittee	Unaffiliated (since October 1995)	
Nikolay Lysenko	Engels No.158 (Ind.)	Member of the Subcommittee	Unaffiliated	
Vitaly Sevastyanov	CPRF party list	Member of the Subcommittee	CPRF	
Sergey Stankevich	PRES party list	Member of the Subcommittee	PRES (until April 1995)	
Sergey Stankevich	PRES party list	Member of the Subcommittee	Unaffiliated (since April 1995)	
Sergey Sychyov	LDPR party list	Member of the Subcommittee	LDPR	
Andrey Makarov	Sheremetyevo No.203 (VR)	Member of the Subcommittee	LDS 12D	since June 1994
Subcommittee on Diplomatic Appointments and Withdrawals
Leonid Petrovsky	CPRF party list	Chairman of the Subcommittee	CPRF	
Aleksandr Filatov	LDPR party list	Member of the Subcommittee	LDPR	
Aivars Lezdinsh	Kamchatka No.88 (Ind.)	Member of the Subcommittee	LDS 12D (until October 1994)	
Aivars Lezdinsh	Kamchatka No.88 (Ind.)	Member of the Subcommittee	Unaffiliated (since October 1994)	
Vladimir Frolov	CPRF party list	Member of the Subcommittee	CPRF	since April 1994
Subcommittee on Economic and Technical Cooperation
Yury Buzov	LDPR party list	Chairman of the Subcommittee	LDPR	
Aleksandr Aulov	Choice of Russia party list	Member of the Subcommittee	Choice of Russia (until March 1995)	
Aleksandr Aulov	Choice of Russia party list	Member of the Subcommittee	Russia (since March 1995)	
Vadim Bulavinov	Kanavinsky No.120 (Ind.)	Member of the Subcommittee	LDS 12D (until March 1995)	until April 1995
Vadim Bulavinov	Kanavinsky No.120 (Ind.)	Member of the Subcommittee	Stability (since March 1995)	until April 1995
Subcommittee on International Cultural, Scientific and Humanitarian Cooperation
Galina Chubkova	Women of Russia party list	Chairwoman of the Subcommittee	Women of Russia	
Andrei Kozyrev	Murmansk No.116 (VR)	Member of the Subcommittee	Choice of Russia (until December 1994)	
Andrei Kozyrev	Murmansk No.116 (VR)	Member of the Subcommittee	Unaffiliated (since December 1994)	
Aleksandr Minzhurenko	Choice of Russia party list	Member of the Subcommittee	Choice of Russia	
Subcommittee on International Law and Human Rights
Yevgeny Ishchenko	LDPR party list	Chairman of the Subcommittee	LDPR	resigned in April 1995
Arkady Murashyov	Choice of Russia party list	Member of the Subcommittee (until April 1995); Chairman of the Subcommittee (since April 1995)	Choice of Russia	
Subcommittee on International Organizations and Interparliamentary Cooperation
Alexander Dzasokhov	North Ossetia No.22 (Ind.)	Chairman of the Subcommittee	NRP	
Anatoly Biryukov	Birobidzhansky No.214 (Ind.)	Member of the Subcommittee	APR	
Oleg Ochin	Novgorod No.123 (PRES)	Member of the Subcommittee	NRP	

=== 2nd State Duma ===
Member	Constituency	Position	Faction	Notes
Vladimir Lukin	Yabloko party list	Chairman of the Committee	Yabloko	
Aleksandr Kozyrev	LDPR party list	Deputy Chairman of the Committee – Chairman of the Subcommittee on International Economic, Technical and Ecological Cooperation	LDPR (until October 1999)	
Aleksandr Kozyrev	LDPR party list	Deputy Chairman of the Committee – Chairman of the Subcommittee on International Economic, Technical and Ecological Cooperation	ND (since October 1999)	
Nikolay Stolyarov	Noginsk No.109 (Ind.)	Deputy Chairman of the Committee	RR	
Aleksandr Shabanov	CPRF party list	Chairman of the Subcommittee on Diplomatic Appointments and Withdrawals (until October 1999); Deputy Chairman of the Committee (since October 1999)	CPRF	
Sergey Glotov	Krasnodar No.40 (VN!)	Chairman of the Subcommittee on Organization and Budget	Narodovlastiye	
Boris Gromov	Saratov No.158 (MO)	Chairman of the Subcommittee on Arms Control and International Security	RR	
Galina Karelova	Ordzhonikidzevsky No.165 (Ind.)	Chairwoman of the Subcommittee on International Scientific, Cultural, Social and Humanitarian Cooperation	Narodovlastiye (until July 1996)	resigned in May 1997
Galina Karelova	Ordzhonikidzevsky No.165 (Ind.)	Chairwoman of the Subcommittee on International Scientific, Cultural, Social and Humanitarian Cooperation	Unaffiliated (since July 1996)	resigned in May 1997
Aleksandr Vengerovsky	LDPR party list	Chairman of the Subcommittee on Foreign Intelligence	LDPR (until July 1996)	
Aleksandr Vengerovsky	LDPR party list	Chairman of the Subcommittee on Foreign Intelligence	Unaffiliated (July – October 1996)	
Aleksandr Vengerovsky	LDPR party list	Chairman of the Subcommittee on Foreign Intelligence	LDPR (October 1996 – October 1999)	
Aleksandr Vengerovsky	LDPR party list	Chairman of the Subcommittee on Foreign Intelligence	ND (since October 1999)	
Viktor Vishnyakov	LDPR party list	Chairman of the Subcommittee on International Law	LDPR	
Aleksey Andreyev	NDR party list	Member of the Committee	NDR	
Vladimir Averchev	Yabloko party list	Member of the Committee	Yabloko	
Aleksandr Dzasokhov	North Ossetia No.21 (Ind.)	Member of the Committee	Narodovlastiye	resigned in January 1998
Gennady Gamza	CPRF party list	Member of the Committee	CPRF	
Telman Gdlyan	Babushkinsky No.192 (Ind.)	Member of the Committee	RR	
Azat Khamayev	Almetyevsk No.22 (APR)	Member of the Committee	ADG (until July 1997)	
Azat Khamayev	Almetyevsk No.22 (APR)	Member of the Committee	RR (since July 1997)	
Sergei Kovalev	Chertanovo No.204 (DVR–OD)	Member of the Committee	DVR	
Igor Malkov	Yabloko party list	Member of the Committee	Yabloko (until October 1999)	
Igor Malkov	Yabloko party list	Member of the Committee	ND (since October 1999)	
Konstantin Meremyanin	CPRF party list	Member of the Committee	CPRF	
Aleksandr Paradiz	NDR party list	Member of the Committee	NDR (until October 1999)	
Aleksandr Paradiz	NDR party list	Member of the Committee	ND (since October 1999)	
Alexey Podberezkin	CPRF party list	Deputy Chairman of the Committee (until October 1999); Member of the Committee (since October 1999)	CPRF (until October 1999)	
Alexey Podberezkin	CPRF party list	Deputy Chairman of the Committee (until October 1999); Member of the Committee (since October 1999)	ND (since October 1999)	
Aleksandr Ponomaryov	Cherepovets No.73 (CPRF)	Member of the Committee	CPRF	
Ivan Rybkin	Anna No.74 (BIR)	Member of the Committee	Unaffiliated	resigned in October 1996
Alzam Saifullin	Birsk No.3 (APR)	Member of the Committee	ADG	until February 1996
Vitaly Sevastyanov	Tuapse No.44 (CPRF)	Member of the Committee	CPRF	
Mikhail Yuryev	Yabloko party list	Member of the Committee	Yabloko	until April 1996
Nina Krivelskaya	LDPR party list	Member of the Committee	LDPR	in July 1996 – December 1998
Nadirshakh Khachilayev	Makhachkala No.11 (Ind.)	Member of the Committee	Unaffiliated (until March 1997)	in December 1996 – May 1998
Nadirshakh Khachilayev	Makhachkala No.11 (Ind.)	Member of the Committee	NDR (March 1997 – May 1998)	in December 1996 – May 1998
Tatyana Yarygina	Yabloko party list	Member of the Committee	Yabloko	since September 1997
Andrei Nikolayev	Orekhovo-Borisovo No.197 (Ind.)	Member of the Committee	Unaffiliated	since June 1998
Alexander Shokhin	NDR party list	Member of the Committee	Unaffiliated	since January 1999
Vladimir Semago	CPRF party list	Member of the Committee	CPRF (until October 1999)	since February 1999
Vladimir Semago	CPRF party list	Member of the Committee	ND (since October 1999)	since February 1999

=== 3rd State Duma ===
Member	Constituency	Position	Faction	Notes
Dmitry Rogozin	Anna No.74 (KRO-B)	Chairman of the Committee	ND	
Aleksandra Buratayeva	Kalmykia No.14 (Unity)	Deputy Chairwoman of the Committee	E-ER	
Konstantin Kosachev	OVR party list	Deputy Chairman of the Committee	O-ER	
Vasily Iver	Stavropol No.55 (CPRF)	Deputy Chairman of the Committee	APG	
Aleksandr Shabanov	CPRF party list	Deputy Chairman of the Committee	CPRF	
Sergey Shishkarev	Novorossiysk No.41 (Ind.)	Deputy Chairman of the Committee	ND	
Leonid Slutsky	Zhirinovsky Bloc party list	Deputy Chairman of the Committee	LDPR	
Flyura Ziyatdinova	Nizhnekamsk No.25 (OVR)	Deputy Chairwoman of the Committee	RR	
Sergey Zagidullin	Kirovsky No.189 (Ind.)	Deputy Chairman of the Committee	ND	since October 2000
Oleg Naumov	SPS party list	Member of the Committee (until March 2002); Deputy Chairman of the Committee (since March 2002)	SPS	since February 2000
Boris Berezovsky	Karachay-Cherkessia No.15 (Ind.)	Member of the Committee	Unaffiliated	resigned in July 2000
Gennady Gamza	CPRF party list	Member of the Committee	CPRF	
Aleksey Guzanov	Zhirinovsky Bloc party list	Member of the Committee	LDPR (until April 2001)	until May 2001
Aleksey Guzanov	Zhirinovsky Bloc party list	Member of the Committee	E-ER (since April 2001)	until May 2001
Valentin Knysh	CPRF party list	Member of the Committee	CPRF	
Valentin Kuptsov	CPRF party list	Member of the Committee	CPRF	
Fandas Safiullin	Almetyevsk No.22 (OVR)	Member of the Committee	RR	
Vladimir Semyonov	Unity party list	Member of the Committee	E-ER	until September 2000
Vitaly Sevastyanov	Tuapse No.44 (CPRF)	Member of the Committee	CPRF	
Vladimir Tikhonov	Kineshma No.79 (CPRF)	Member of the Committee	CPRF	resigned in December 2000
Tatyana Yarygina	Yabloko party list	Member of the Committee	Yabloko	since December 2000
Vadim Orlov	Ulyanovsk No.181 (Ind.)	Member of the Committee	ND	since May 2001
Nadezhda Azarova	OVR party list	Member of the Committee	O-ER	in March – April 2002
Viktor Alksnis	Odintsovo No.110 (Ind.)	Member of the Committee	RR	since September 2002
Nikolay Benediktov	CPRF party list	Member of the Committee	CPRF	since September 2002
Khalil Barlybayev	Sibay No.6 (OVR)	Member of the Committee	RR	since September 2003

=== 4th State Duma ===
Member	Constituency	Position	Faction	Notes
Konstantin Kosachev	United Russia party list	Chairman of the Committee	United Russia	
Yuly Kvitsinsky	CPRF party list	First Deputy Chairman of the Committee	CPRF	
Leonid Slutsky	LDPR party list	First Deputy Chairman of the Committee	LDPR	
Aleksandr Karelin	United Russia party list	Deputy Chairman of the Committee	United Russia	
Alexander Kozlovsky	United Russia party list	Deputy Chairman of the Committee	United Russia	
Vasily Kuznetsov	Buryatia No.9 (ER)	Deputy Chairman of the Committee	United Russia	
Zelimkhan Mutsoev	Pervouralsk No.166 (NPRF)	Deputy Chairman of the Committee	United Russia	
Natalya Narochnitskaya	Rodina party list	Deputy Chairwoman of the Committee	SR-Rodina	
Alexey Ostrovsky	LDPR party list	Member of the Committee	LDPR	until October 2005
Alexey Ostrovsky	LDPR party list	Deputy Chairman of the Committee	LDPR	since September 2007
Igor Barinov	Artyomovsky No.161 (ER)	Member of the Committee	United Russia	
Valery Bogomolov	United Russia party list	Member of the Committee	United Russia	
Vitaly Sevastyanov	Apsheronsk No.39 (CPRF)	Member of the Committee	CPRF	
Shamil Sultanov	Rodina party list	Member of the Committee	SR-Rodina	
Anatoly Yermolin	United Russia party list	Member of the Committee	United Russia (until November 2004)	
Anatoly Yermolin	United Russia party list	Member of the Committee	Unaffiliated (since November 2004)	
Andrey Zhukov	Rodina party list	Member of the Committee	SR-Rodina	until July 2006
Nikolay Benediktov	CPRF party list	Member of the Committee	CPRF	since April 2004
Valentin Kuptsov	CPRF party list	Member of the Committee	CPRF	since April 2004
Boris Plokhotnyuk	Orsk No.133 (Ind.)	Member of the Committee	United Russia	since April 2004
Dmitry Rogozin	Anna No.76 (Rodina)	Member of the Committee	SR-Rodina	in April 2004 – September 2006
Lyubov Sliska	United Russia party list	Member of the Committee	United Russia	in April 2004 – October 2005
Ruslan Yamadayev	United Russia party list	Member of the Committee	United Russia	since April 2004
Vladimir Zhirinovsky	LDPR party list	Member of the Committee	LDPR	in April 2004 – February 2005
Anatoly Starkov	Sterlitamak No.8 (ER)	Member of the Committee	United Russia	since May 2004
Kamilya Davletova	Kumertau No.5 (ER)	Member of the Committee	United Russia	since April 2005
Andrey Klimov	Komi-Permyak No.216 (Ind.)	Member of the Committee	United Russia	since October 2005
Igor Morozov	Shilovo No.150 (ER)	Member of the Committee	SR-Rodina	since September 2006
Nikolai Kuryanovich	LDPR party list	Member of the Committee	Unaffiliated	since September 2007

=== 5th State Duma ===
Member	Party	Position	Notes
Konstantin Kosachev	United Russia	Chairman of the Committee	
Yuly Kvitsinsky	CPRF	First Deputy Chairman of the Committee	died in March 2010
Leonid Slutsky	LDPR	First Deputy Chairman of the Committee	
Leonid Kalashnikov	CPRF	First Deputy Chairman of the Committee	since April 2010
Andrey Klimov	United Russia	Deputy Chairman of the Committee – Chairman of the Subcommittee on European Cooperation	
Alexander Kozlovsky	United Russia	Deputy Chairman of the Committee – Chairman of the Subcommittee on Relations with the USA	until April 2011
Zelimkhan Mutsoev	United Russia	Deputy Chairman of the Committee	
Aleksandr Klyukin	United Russia	Member of the Committee – Chairman of the Subcommittee on Positive Image of Russia Abroad	
Ruslan Kondratov	United Russia	Member of the Committee – Chairman of the Subcommittee on Asia-Pacific Cooperation	
Anatoly Starodubets	United Russia	Member of the Committee – Chairman of the Subcommittee on International Cooperation in Combating Terrorism, Organized Crime, Drug Trafficking, Illegal Migration, and Border Policy	
Tatiana Voronova	United Russia	Member of the Committee – Chairwoman of the Subcommittee on International Humanitarian and Youth Cooperation	until November 2009
Semyon Bagdasarov	A Just Russia	Member of the Committee	
Valery Bogomolov	United Russia	Member of the Committee	resigned in October 2011
Aleksandr Karelin	United Russia	Member of the Committee	
Adnan Muzykayev	A Just Russia	Member of the Committee	
Ivan Savvidi	United Russia	Member of the Committee	
Mikhail Terentyev	United Russia	Member of the Committee	
Valery Seleznev	LDPR	Member of the Committee	since April 2009
Natalya Yermakova	United Russia	Member of the Committee	since July 2010
Kira Lukyanova	A Just Russia	Member of the Committee	since January 2011
Vasily Kuznetsov	United Russia	Member of the Committee	since February 2011
Lyudmila Pirozhnikova	United Russia	Member of the Committee	since May 2011

=== 6th State Duma ===
Member	Party	Position	Notes
Aleksey Pushkov	United Russia	Chairman of the Committee	
Leonid Kalashnikov	CPRF	First Deputy Chairman of the Committee	
Konstantin Kosachev	United Russia	First Deputy Chairman of the Committee	resigned in March 2012
Andrey Klimov	United Russia	Deputy Chairman of the Committee (until March 2012); First Deputy Chairman of the Committee (since March 2012)	resigned in July 2012
Vyacheslav Nikonov	United Russia	First Deputy Chairman of the Committee	in September 2012 – March 2013
Svetlana Zhurova	United Russia	First Deputy Chairwoman of the Committee	since June 2013
Ivan Kvitka	United Russia	Deputy Chairman of the Committee	
Aleksandr Romanovich	A Just Russia	Deputy Chairman of the Committee	
Valentina Tereshkova	United Russia	Member of the Committee (until March 2012); Deputy Chairwoman of the Committee (since March 2012)	
Alexander Babakov	United Russia	Member of the Committee	
Aleksandr Karelin	United Russia	Member of the Committee	
Nikolai Levichev	A Just Russia	Member of the Committee	resigned in February 2016
Vasily Likhachyov	CPRF	Member of the Committee	until February 2012
Anvar Makhmutov	United Russia	Member of the Committee	
Adnan Muzykayev	A Just Russia	Member of the Committee	
Shamsail Saraliev	United Russia	Member of the Committee	
Adalbi Shkhagoshev	United Russia	Member of the Committee	
Mikhail Zapolev	CPRF	Member of the Committee	
Yan Zelinsky	LDPR	Member of the Committee	
Boris Gromov	United Russia	Member of the Committee	since June 2013
Roman Khudyakov	LDPR	Member of the Committee	since September 2015
Oleg Kim	CPRF	Member of the Committee	since April 2016
Anton Morozov	LDPR	Member of the Committee	since April 2016

=== 7th State Duma ===
Member	Constituency	Position	Faction	Notes
Leonid Slutsky	LDPR party list	Chairman of the Committee	LDPR	
Dmitry Novikov	CPRF party list	First Deputy Chairman of the Committee	CPRF	
Svetlana Zhurova	United Russia party list	First Deputy Chairwoman of the Committee	United Russia	
Yury Oleynikov	Serpukhov No.126 (ER)	First Deputy Chairman of the Committee	United Russia	since September 2019
Alexey Chepa	A Just Russia party list	Deputy Chairman of the Committee	A Just Russia	
Anatoly Karpov	United Russia party list	Deputy Chairman of the Committee	United Russia	until September 2019
Irina Rodnina	Dmitrov No.118 (ER)	Deputy Chairwoman of the Committee	United Russia	
Natalia Poklonskaya	United Russia party list	Deputy Chairwoman of the Committee	United Russia	since September 2019
Tatyana Alekseyeva	Kemerovo No.101 (ER)	Member of the Committee	United Russia	
Artur Chilingarov	United Russia party list	Member of the Committee	United Russia	
Murad Gadylshin	United Russia party list	Member of the Committee	United Russia	
Zaur Gekkiyev	United Russia party list	Member of the Committee	United Russia	until January 2020
Yury Levitsky	United Russia party list	Member of the Committee	United Russia	until January 2019
Vitaly Milonov	Southern No.218 (ER)	Member of the Committee	United Russia	until November 2018
Anton Morozov	LDPR party list	Member of the Committee	LDPR	
Zelimkhan Mutsoev	Pervouralsk No.173 (ER)	Member of the Committee	United Russia	until July 2019
Yelena Panina	Nagatinsky No.201 (ER)	Member of the Committee	United Russia	
Sergey Shargunov	CPRF party list	Member of the Committee	CPRF	until January 2019
Adalbi Shkhagoshev	Kabardino-Balkaria No.14 (ER)	Member of the Committee	United Russia	until November 2017
Andrei Skoch	Stary Oskol No.76 (ER)	Member of the Committee	United Russia	
Yelena Strokova	LDPR party list	Member of the Committee	LDPR	
Irina Yevtushenko	United Russia party list	Member of the Committee	United Russia	died in January 2017
Sergei Zheleznyak	Perovo No.204 (ER)	Member of the Committee	United Russia	
Aleksey Zhuravlyov	Anna No.89 (Rodina)	Member of the Committee	Unaffiliated	until December 2016
Sergey Marinin	LDPR party list	Member of the Committee	LDPR	since November 2016
Rasul Botashev	Karachay-Cherkessia No.16 (ER)	Member of the Committee	United Russia	since March 2017
Gadzhimurad Omarov	A Just Russia party list	Member of the Committee	A Just Russia	in December 2017 – June 2019
Inga Yumasheva	United Russia party list	Member of the Committee	United Russia	in February 2018 – June 2020
Yevgeny Primakov Jr.	Balashov No.165 (ER)	Member of the Committee	United Russia	in September 2018 – June 2020
Abdulmazhid Magramov	Southern No.12 (ER)	Member of the Committee	United Russia	since September 2019

=== 8th State Duma ===
Member	Constituency	Position	Faction	Notes
Leonid Slutsky	LDPR party list	Chair of the Committee	LDPR	
Svetlana Zhurova	Vsevolozhsk No.111 (ER)	First Deputy Chair of the Committee	United Russia	
Vyacheslav Nikonov	United Russia party list	First Deputy Chair of the Committee	United Russia	
Dmitry Novikov	CPRF party list	First Deputy Chair of the Committee	CPRF	
Shamsail Saraliev	United Russia party list	First Deputy Chair of the Committee	United Russia	
Alexey Chepa	SR–ZP party list	First Deputy Chair of the Committee	SR–ZP	
Irina Rodnina	Dmitrov No.118 (ER)	Deputy Chair of the Committee	United Russia	
Dmitry Belik	United Russia party list	Member of the Committee	United Russia	
Maria Butina	United Russia party list	Member of the Committee	United Russia	
Artur Chilingarov	United Russia party list	Member of the Committee	United Russia	died in June 2024
Sergey Kotkin	Nenets No.221 (ER)	Member of the Committee	United Russia	
Zelimkhan Mutsoev	Pervouralsk No.173 (ER)	Member of the Committee	United Russia	
Valentina Tereshkova	United Russia party list	Member of the Committee	United Russia	
Saygidpasha Umakhanov	United Russia party list	Member of the Committee	United Russia	
Roza Chemeris	New People party list	Member of the Committee	New People	since January 2022
Dmitry Kuznetsov	SR–ZP party list	Member of the Committee	SR–ZP	since December 2023
Nikolai Brykin	Tyumen No.185 (ER)	Member of the Committee	United Russia	since October 2024
Dmitry Savelyev	Central No.136 (ER)	Member of the Committee	United Russia	since March 2025
