= Neo-Stalinism =

Movement to revive Stalinist ideas and governance

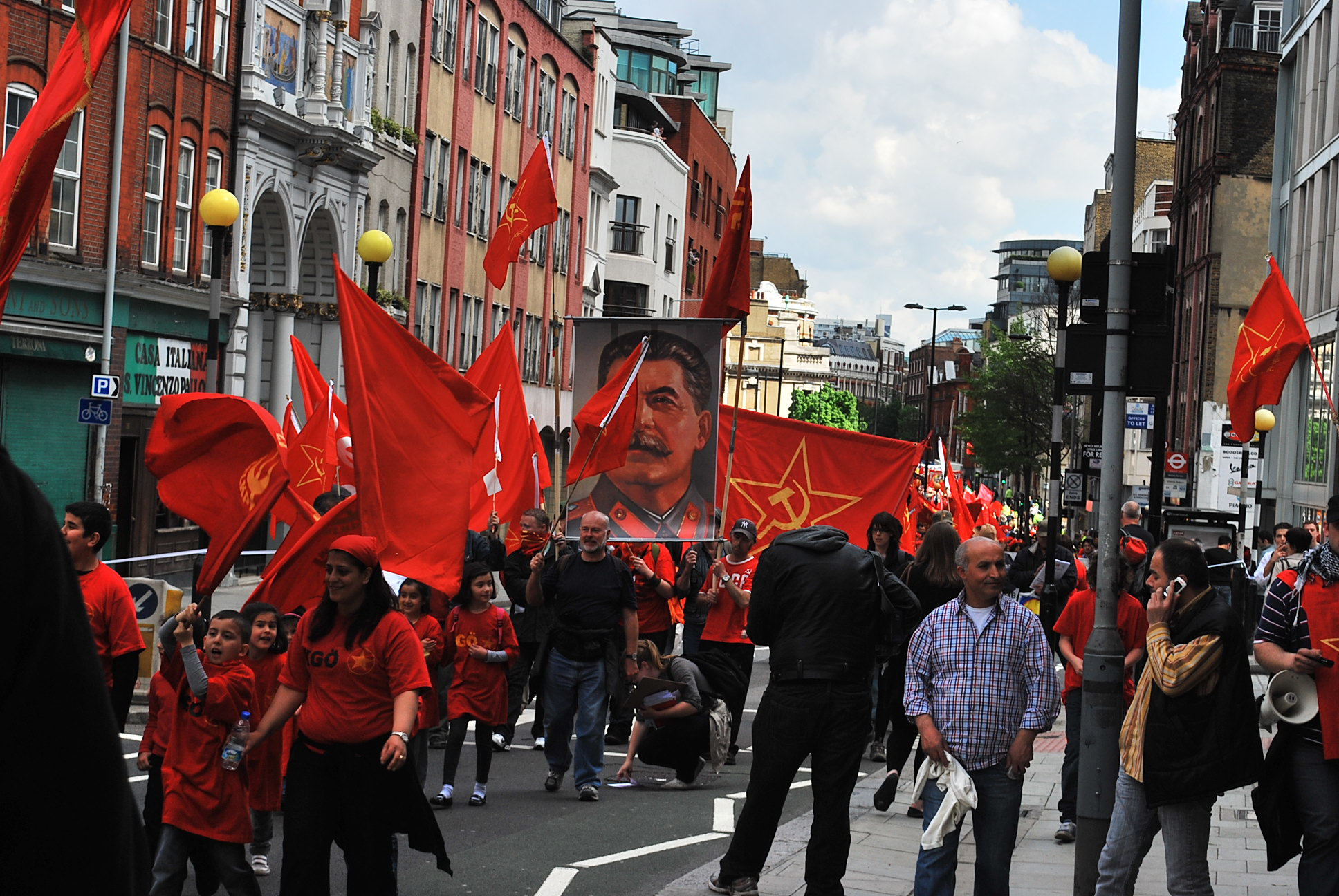
May Day procession with Joseph Stalin's portrait in London, 2010

Neo-Stalinism is the promotion of positive views of Joseph Stalin's role in history, the partial re-establishing of Stalin's policies on certain or all issues, and nostalgia for the Stalinist period. Neo-Stalinism overlaps significantly with neo-Sovietism and Soviet nostalgia. Various definitions of the term have been given over the years. Neo-Stalinism is being actively promoted by Eurasianist currents in various post-Soviet states and official rehabilitation of Stalin has occurred in Russia under Vladimir Putin. Eurasianist philosopher Aleksandr Dugin, an influential neo-Stalinist ideologue in Russian elite circles, has praised Stalin as the "greatest personality in Russian history", comparing him to Ivan IV who established the Tsardom of Russia.

== Definitions ==
The American Trotskyist Hal Draper used "neo-Stalinism" in 1948 to refer to a new political ideology—new development in Soviet policy, which he defined as a reactionary trend whose beginning was associated with the popular front period of the mid-1930s, writing: "The ideologists of neo-Stalinism are merely the tendrils shot ahead by the phenomena – fascism and Stalinism – which outline the social and political form of a neo-barbarism".

During the 1960s, the Central Intelligence Agency (CIA) distinguished between Stalinism and neo-Stalinism in that "[t]he Soviet leaders have not reverted to two extremes of Stalin's rule – one-man dictatorship and mass terror. For this reason, their policy deserves the label "neo-Stalinist" rather than "Stalinist".

Katerina Clark, describing an anti-Khrushchev, pro-Stalin current in Soviet literary world during the 1960s, described the work of "neo-Stalinist" writers as harking back to "the Stalin era and its leaders ... as a time of unity, strong rule and national honor". According to historian Roy Medvedev, writing in 1975, the term describes the rehabilitation of Joseph Stalin, identification with him and the associated political system, nostalgia for the Stalinist period in Russia's history, restoration of Stalinist policies and a return to the administrative terror of the Stalinist period while avoiding some of the worst excesses.

Political geographer Denis J. B. Shaw, writing in 1999, considered the Soviet Union as neo-Stalinist until the post-1985 period of transition to capitalism. He identified neo-Stalinism as a political system with planned economy and highly developed military–industrial complex. Philosopher Frederick Copleston, writing in 1986, portrays neo-Stalinism as a "Slavophile emphasis on Russia and her history", saying that "what is called neo-Stalinism is not exclusively an expression of a desire to control, dominate, repress and dragoon; it is also the expression of a desire that Russia, while making use of western science and technology, should avoid contamination by western 'degenerate' attitudes and pursue her own path". According to former General Secretary of the Communist Party of the Soviet Union Mikhail Gorbachev, using the term in 2006, it more broadly refers to a moderated Stalinist state without large-scale repressions, but with persecution of political opponents and total control of all political activities in the country.

=== Stalinism and anti-Stalinism ===
In his monograph Reconsidering Stalinism, historian Henry Reichman discusses differing and evolving perspectives on the use of the term Stalinism, saying that "in scholarly usage 'Stalinism' describes here a movement, there an economic, political, or social system, elsewhere a type of political practice or belief-system". He references historian Stephen Cohen's work reassessing Soviet history after Stalin as a "continuing tension between anti-Stalinist reformism and neo-Stalinist conservatism", observing that such a characterization requires a "coherent" definition of Stalinism—whose essential features Cohen leaves undefined.

=== Alleged neo-Stalinist regimes ===
Some historians and political scientists have classified the régime of Romania under Nicolae Ceaușescu (1965–1989) as "neo-Stalinist". Albanian leader Enver Hoxha (in power 1943 to 1985) described himself as Stalinist, and his ideology – Hoxhaism – features some Stalinist elements. After Stalin's death (1953), Hoxha denounced Stalin's successor Nikita Khrushchev and accused him of revisionism in the mid-1950s – the differences eventually caused Albania to withdraw from the Warsaw Pact in 1968.

The Khalq regime in Afghanistan (April 1978 – December 1979) has been described as neo-Stalinist with its leader Hafizullah Amin, who kept a portrait of Joseph Stalin on his desk. When Soviet officials criticized him for his brutality, Amin replied "Comrade Stalin showed us how to build socialism in a backward country". Its policies shocked the country and contributed to starting the Soviet–Afghan War of 1979–1989 and subsequent Afghan Civil War.

Some Western sources have characterised North Korea as a neo-Stalinist state; North Korea abandoned Marxism–Leninism and adopted Juche as its official ideology in the 1970s, with references to Marxism–Leninism altogether scrapped from the revised state constitution in 1992, followed by references to communism in 2009.

Ba'athist Syria had long been considered to be a neo-Stalinist state; when Hafez al-Assad established a police state modelled after Stalin's rule during 1970s. Assad's military dictatorship borrowed many features of Stalinism; such as a brutal security apparatus operating extrajudicially, mass-surveillance in the society through an invasive secret police and a pervasive state-sponsored personality cult centred around the ruling family. Assad dynasty ruled Syria by vicious methods of violence throughout its reign, characterized by state terror, massacres, aerial bombing of cities, military clampdowns, etc.; which has resulted in hundreds of thousands of deaths.

Ba'athist Iraq had also been considered to be a neo-Stalinist state; when Saddam Hussein established a police state modelled after Stalin's rule during 1970s. Hussein's dictatorship borrowed many features of Stalinism; such as a brutal security apparatus operating extrajudicially, mass-surveillance in the society through an invasive secret police and a pervasive state-sponsored personality cult centred around the ruling Ba'ath Party. Saddam Hussein ruled Iraq by sadistic methods of violence throughout its reign, characterized by state terror, massacres, purges, extortions, aerial bombing of cities, smuggling, etc.; which has resulted in hundreds of thousands of deaths. He also turned Iraq into a "mafia state" by starting the 1979 Ba'ath Party Purge through violence, racketeering and other methods.

In the Soviet Union after Stalin's death, Georgi Malenkov, one of the new leadership group (Premier of the Soviet Union from 1953 to 1955), also headlined new ideologies. He publicly began to advocate for peace and wanted to reduce tensions by negotiating Cold-War issues, and expressing a desire to get along with the West. He called for meetings between the East and West in hopes of reducing forces in Europe, while also advocating for a settlement of the Korean situation and for German reunification.

Some socialist groups like the Trotskyist Alliance for Workers' Liberty characterise modern China as "neo-Stalinist". By the end of the 20th and the beginning of the 21st century, Turkmenistan's Saparmurat Niyazov non-communist regime was sometimes considered a neo-Stalinist one, especially in respect of Niyazov's cult of personality. Islam Karimov's non-communist authoritarian regime in Uzbekistan from 1989 to 2016 has also been described as "neo-Stalinist". In June 2025, Leonard Quart in The Berkshire Eagle described Donald Trump's second presidency as having neo-Stalinist qualities, due to Trump's suppression of dissenting cultural figures. Nicaraguan musicians Luis Enrique and Carlos Mejía Godoy described Daniel Ortega regime as neo-Stalinist regime due to suppression of free press and opposition.

== History of neo-Stalinism ==
=== Soviet Union ===
In February 1956, Soviet leader Nikita Khrushchev denounced the cult of personality surrounding his predecessor Joseph Stalin and condemned crimes committed during the Great Purge. Khrushchev gave his four-hour speech, "On the Cult of Personality and Its Consequences", condemning the Stalin regime. Historian Robert V. Daniels holds that "neo-Stalinism prevailed politically for more than a quarter of a century after Stalin himself left the scene". Following the Trotskyist comprehension of Stalin's policies as a deviation from the path of Marxism–Leninism, George Novack described Khrushchev's politics as guided by a "neo-Stalinist line", its principle being that "the socialist forces can conquer all opposition even in the imperialist centers, not by the example of internal class power, but by the external power of Soviet example", explaining as such: "Khrushchev's innovations at the Twentieth Congress ... made official doctrine of Stalin's revisionist practices [as] the new program discards the Leninist conception of imperialism and its corresponding revolutionary class struggle policies". American broadcasts into Europe during the late 1950s described a political struggle between the "old Stalinists" and "the neo-Stalinist Khrushchev".

In October 1964, Khrushchev was replaced by Leonid Brezhnev, who remained in office until his death in November 1982. During his reign, Stalin's controversies were de-emphasized. Andres Laiapea connects this with "the exile of many dissidents, especially Aleksandr Solzhenitsyn", though whereas Laiapea writes that "[t]he rehabilitation of Stalin went hand in hand with the establishment of a personality cult around Brezhnev", political sociologist Viktor Zaslavsky characterizes Brezhnev's period as one of "neo-Stalinist compromise" as the essentials of the political atmosphere associated with Stalin were retained without a personality cult. According to Alexander Dubček, "[t]he advent of Brezhnev’s regime heralded the advent of neo-Stalinism, and the measures taken against Czechoslovakia in 1968 were the final consolidation of the neo-Stalinist forces in the Soviet Union, Poland, Hungary, and other countries". American political scientist Seweryn Bialer has described Soviet policy as turning towards neo-Stalinism after Brezhnev's death.

After Mikhail Gorbachev took over in March 1985, he introduced the policy of glasnost in public discussions to liberalize the Soviet system. Within six years, the Soviet Union fell apart. Still, Gorbachev admitted in 2000 that "[e]ven now in Russia we have the same problem. It isn't so easy to give up the inheritance we received from Stalinism and Neo-Stalinism, when people were turned into cogs in the wheel, and those in power made all the decisions for them". Gorbachev's domestic policies have been described as neo-Stalinist by some Western sources.

=== Post-Soviet states ===
The most fervent proponents of neo-Stalinism and rehabilitation of Stalin in post-Soviet Russia include the Communist Party of the Russian Federation (CPRF). With the approval of Putin's government, the CPRF has installed hundreds of monuments glorifying Stalin all across Russia since the 2000s. CPRF has been organizing annual ceremonies at the grave of Stalin in Kremlin Wall Necropolis to commemorate his birthday.

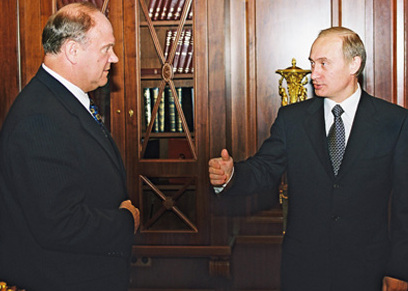
Vladimir Putin with CPRF chief Gennady Zyuganov in the Kremlin. Both have been influential proponents of Neo-Stalinism in post-Soviet Russia.

Formed in 1992 by anti-Gorbachev hardliners of the CPSU, CPRF became a vehement opponent of 1990s privatization policies and has denounced the current boundaries of Russian Federation as "unnatural". Blaming Russia's decline on Western capitalism, CPRF leader Gennady Zyuganov proposes the revival of Soviet Union to restore Russian prestige. The party advocates communist Eurasianism, which believes in the construction of a new "socialist Eurasian homeland" through re-incorporation of post-Soviet countries; imagining the new state as the harbinger "for remaking history" and lead the Socialist Bloc once again. Through its embrace of Russian nationalism, the party portrays communism as an organic expression or communal soul ("sobornost") of "the age-old Russian traditions of community and collectivism" which distinguishes Russian World from the Western world and its "bourgeois values and market individualism". CPRF believes that the revival of Russia's "Derzhava" (super-power status) is dependent on instilling Russians with Soviet patriotism and neo-Stalinism; marked by glorification of Bolshevik Revolution and technological prowess of Soviet Union, promotion of myths around "Great Patriotic War" and adulation of the Stalinist era.

Russia under Vladimir Putin underwent an extensive state-backed programme of Re-Stalinization; through mass media, cinema, academia, educational institutions, military propaganda and historiography. Sociologist Dina Khapaeva asserts that a "social consensus" has emerged amongst the majority of Russian citizens, academics and authorities in rehabilitating Stalin. In 2014, Russian Duma passed a controversial "memory law" criminalizing discussions of atrocities committed during the Stalinist era or making comparisons between Nazism and Stalinism, under the pretexts of combating Neo-Nazism and defending the "historical memory of events which took place during the Second World War". Despite strong condemnation from international historical societies across the world, the bill was passed and inserted as an article into the Russian Criminal Code. The bill was supported by the ruling United Russia Party and allied Communist Party.

With the outbreak of the Russo-Ukrainian war in 2014, neo-Stalinism underwent an explosive growth across the Russian society with the firm backing of the state. Vladimir Putin has personally endorsed the re-emergence of the Stalin cult, portraying the Soviet dictator as a visionary who saved the world from European fascism and led Russians to victory during the Second World War. Various busts and portraits of Stalin have been installed in territories controlled by Russian-backed separatists in Eastern Ukraine. The CPRF has been one of the biggest backers of the invasion of Ukraine launched by Putin in 2022, viewing it as being aligned with their neo-Stalinist world-view.

==== School education ====
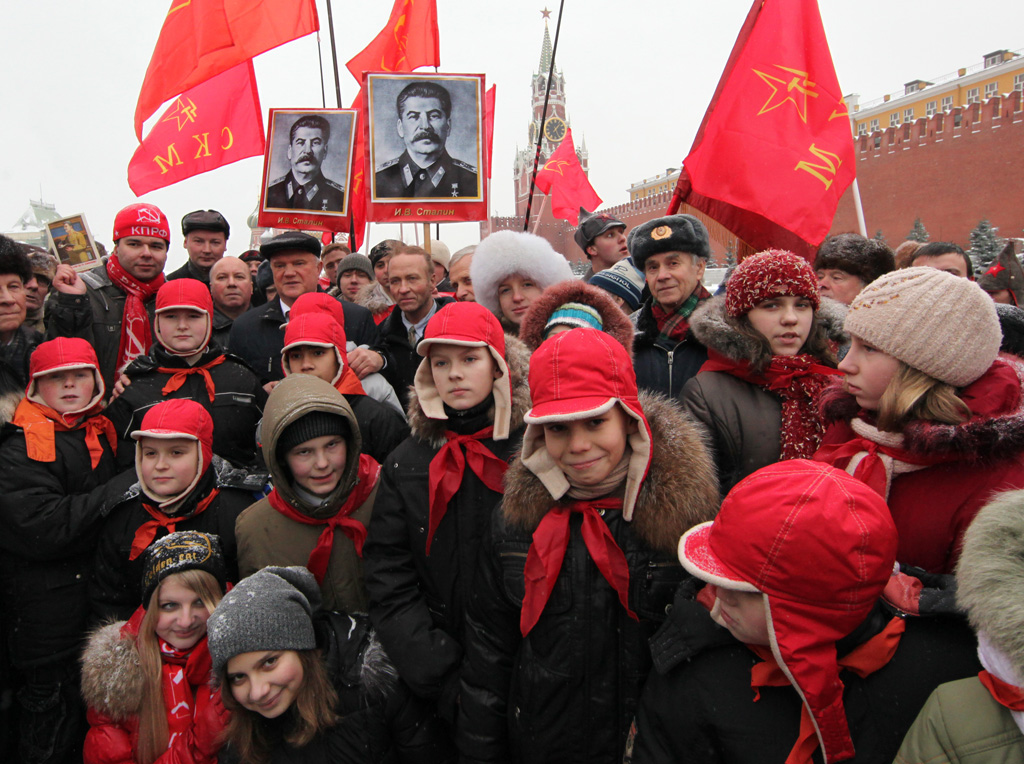
Marxist–Leninist activists laying wreaths at Stalin's grave in 2009

In June 2007, Russian President Vladimir Putin organized a conference for history teachers to promote a high school teachers manual called A Modern History of Russia: 1945–2006: A Manual for History Teachers, which according to Irina Flige (office director of human rights organization Memorial) portrays Stalin as a cruel yet successful leader who "acted rationally". She claims it justifies Stalin's terror as an "instrument of development". Putin said at the conference that the new manual will "help instill young people with a sense of pride in Russia", and he posited that Stalin's purges pale in comparison to the United States' atomic bombings of Hiroshima and Nagasaki. At a memorial for Stalin's victims, Putin said that while Russians should "keep alive the memory of tragedies of the past, we should focus on all that is best in the country".

The official policy of the Russian Federation is that teachers and schools are free to choose history textbooks from the list of the admitted ones, which includes a total of forty-eight history text books for grade school and twenty-four history textbooks by various authors for high school.

In September 2009, the Education Ministry of Russia announced that Aleksandr Solzhenitsyn's The Gulag Archipelago, a book once banned in the Soviet Union for the detailed account on the system of prison camps, became required reading for Russian high-school students. Prior to that, Russian students studied Solzhenitsyn's short story Matryonin dvor and his novella One Day in the Life of Ivan Denisovich, an account of a single day in the life of a gulag prisoner.

==== History studies ====
In 2009, it was reported that the Russian government was drawing up plans to criminalize statements and acts that deny the Soviet Union's victory over fascism in World War II or its role in liberating Eastern Europe. In May 2009, President Dmitry Medvedev described the Soviet Union during the war as "our country" and set up the Historical Truth Commission to act against what the Kremlin terms falsifications of Russian history.

On 3 July 2009, Russia's delegation at the Organization for Security and Co-operation in Europe's (OSCE) annual parliamentary meeting stormed out after a resolution was passed equating the roles of Nazi Germany and the Soviet Union in starting World War II, drafted by delegates from Lithuania and Slovenia. The resolution called for a day of remembrance for victims of both Stalinism and Nazism to be marked every 23 August, the date in 1939 when Nazi Germany and the Soviet Union signed the Molotov–Ribbentrop Pact of neutrality with a secret protocol that divided parts of Central and Eastern Europe between their spheres of influence.

Konstantin Kosachev, head of the foreign relations committee of Russia's lower house of parliament, called the resolution "nothing but an attempt to rewrite the history of World War II". Alexander Kozlovsky, the head of the Russian delegation, called the resolution an "insulting anti-Russian attack" and added that "[t]hose who place Nazism and Stalinism on the same level forget that it is the Stalin-era Soviet Union that made the biggest sacrifices and the biggest contribution to liberating Europe from fascism". Only eight out of 385 assembly members voted against the resolution.

==== Kurskaya station controversy ====
At the end of August 2009 a gilded slogan, a fragment of the Soviet national anthem was re-inscribed at the Moscow Metro's Kursky station beneath eight socialist realist statues, reading: "Stalin reared us on loyalty to the people. He inspired us to labour and heroism". The slogan had been removed in the 1950s during Nikita Khrushchev's period of de-Stalinization. Another restored slogan reads: "For the Motherland! For Stalin!".

Restoring the slogans was ordered by the head of the metro Dmitry Gayev. He explained his decision with restoring the historic view of the station: "My attitude towards this story is simple: this inscription was at the station Kurskaya since its foundation, and it will stay there".

The chairman of a human rights group Memorial Arseny Roginsky stated: "This is the fruit of creeping re-Stalinization and ... they [the authorities] want to use his name as a symbol of a powerful authoritarian state which the whole world is afraid of". Other human rights organizations and survivors of Stalin's repressions called for the decorations to be removed in a letter to Moscow Mayor Yury Luzhkov.

Mikhail Shvydkoy, the special representative of the President of Russia for the international cultural exchange, responded to the controversy: "In my opinion, the question whether such inscriptions should exist in the Moscow underground is not the question in the competence of neither the Mayor of Moscow, nor even the head of the Moscow underground. One can't take decisions that may break the society that's heated up and politicized even without that. It seems to me, that the presence of the lines about Stalin in the hall of the metro station Kurskaya is the question that should become the matter of discussion for the city denizens". Shvydkoy commented that what Stalin did in respect of the Soviet and in particular Russian people cannot be justified and he does not even deserve a neutral attitude, much less praise. However, he said "it's necessary to remember your own butchers" and without that memory they can "grow among us again". Shvydkoy said that the question is that the society must remember that "Stalin is a tyrant". While the inscription in the Metro should merely be read correctly, "read with the certain attitude to Stalin's personality". Shvydkoy also said that if the hall of the station Kurskaya is a monument of architecture and culture, the inscription must be left because "to knock down inscriptions is vandalism".

==== Public views and opinions ====
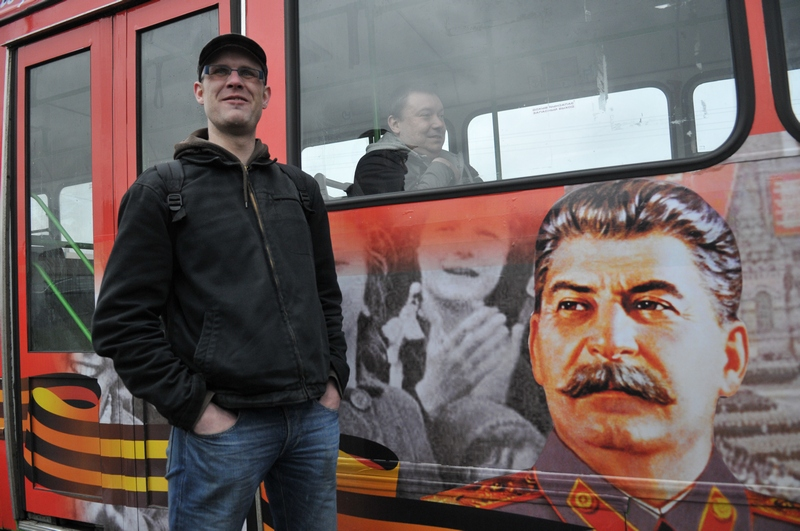
A Saint Petersburg bus with Stalin's portrait which was included in a montage that commemorated the Soviet Union's victory in the Second World War

Polling by the Levada Center suggest Stalin's popularity has grown since 2015, with 46% of Russians expressing a favourable view of him in 2017 and 51% in 2019. In a 2021 poll, a record 70% of Russians indicated they had a mostly/very favourable view of Stalin. The same year, a survey by the Center showed that Joseph Stalin was named by 39% of Russians as the "most outstanding national figure of all time" and, while nobody received an absolute majority, Stalin was very clearly in first place, followed by another Soviet leader Vladimir Lenin with 30% and Russian poet Alexander Pushkin with 23%. At the same time, there was a growth in pro-Stalinist literature in Russia, much relying upon the misrepresentation or fabrication of source material. In this literature, Stalin's repressions are regarded either as a necessary measure to defeat "enemies of the people" or the result of lower-level officials acting without Stalin's knowledge.

The only other part of the former Soviet Union other than Russia where admiration for Stalin has remained consistently widespread is Georgia, although Georgian attitudes have been very divided. A number of Georgians resent criticism of Stalin, the most famous figure from their nation's modern history. A 2013 survey by Tbilisi State University found 45% of Georgians expressing "a positive attitude" to him. A 2017 Pew Research survey had 57% of Georgians saying he played a positive role in history, compared to 18% of those expressing the same for Gorbachev.

Some positive sentiment can also be found elsewhere in the former Soviet Union. A 2012 survey commissioned by the Carnegie Endowment found 38% of Armenians concurring that their country "will always have need of a leader like Stalin". In early 2010, a new monument to Stalin was erected in Zaporizhzhia, Ukraine. In December 2010, unknown persons decapitated it and it was destroyed in a bomb attack in 2011. In a 2016 Kyiv International Institute of Sociology poll, 38% of respondents had a negative attitude to Stalin, 26% a neutral one and 17% a positive, with 19% refusing to answer.

Scholar Dmitri Furman, director of the Commonwealth of Independent States Research Center at the Russian Academy's of Sciences Institute of Europe, sees the Russian regime's neo-Stalinism as a "non-ideological Stalinism" that "seeks control for the sake of control, not for the sake of world revolution".

In 2005, Communist politician Gennady Zyuganov said that Russia "should once again render honor to Stalin for his role in building socialism and saving human civilization from the Nazi plague". Zyuganov has said "Great Stalin does not need rehabilitation" and has proposed changing the name of Volgograd back to Stalingrad. In 2010, the Communist leader stated: "Today ... the greatness of Stalin's era is self-evident even to his most furious haters ... We liberated the whole world!".

In 2008, Dmitry Puchkov accused the authorities of raising a wave of anti-Stalin propaganda to distract the attention of the population from topical troubles. In a December 2008 interview, he was asked a question: "Dmitry Yurievich, what do you think, is the new wave of 'unveiling the horrors of Stalinism' on the TV related to the approaching consequences of the crisis or is it merely another [mental] exacerbation?". He replied: "The wave is being raised to distract opinion of the population from the up-to-date troubles. You don't have to think of your pension, you don't have to think of the education, what matters are the horrors of Stalinism".

In 2016, political scientist Thomas Sherlock claimed that Russia has pulled back somewhat on its neo-Stalinist policies, commenting: "The Kremlin is unwilling to develop and impose on society historical narratives which promote chauvinism, hypernationalism, and re-Stalinization. Although such an agenda has some support among incumbent elites and in society, it remains subordinate. ... Instead, the regime is now extending support to ... a critical assessment of the Soviet era, including Stalinism. This emerging criticism of the Soviet past serves a number of important goals of the leadership, including re-engagement with the West. To this end, the Kremlin recently approved new history textbooks critical of the Soviet past as well as a significant program that memorializes the victims of Soviet repressions".

== See also ==
- Anti-Stalinist left
- Chinese New Left
- Communist nostalgia
- De-Stalinization
- Grover Furr
- Ludo Martens
- Neo-Sovietism
- Nostalgia for the Soviet Union
- "On the Cult of Personality and Its Consequences"
- Soviet patriotism
- Stalin Society
- The Stalinist Legacy
- Tankie, a pejorative term for pro-Soviet communists
