= Aleksey Pushkov =

Russian politician

- Алексей Пушков
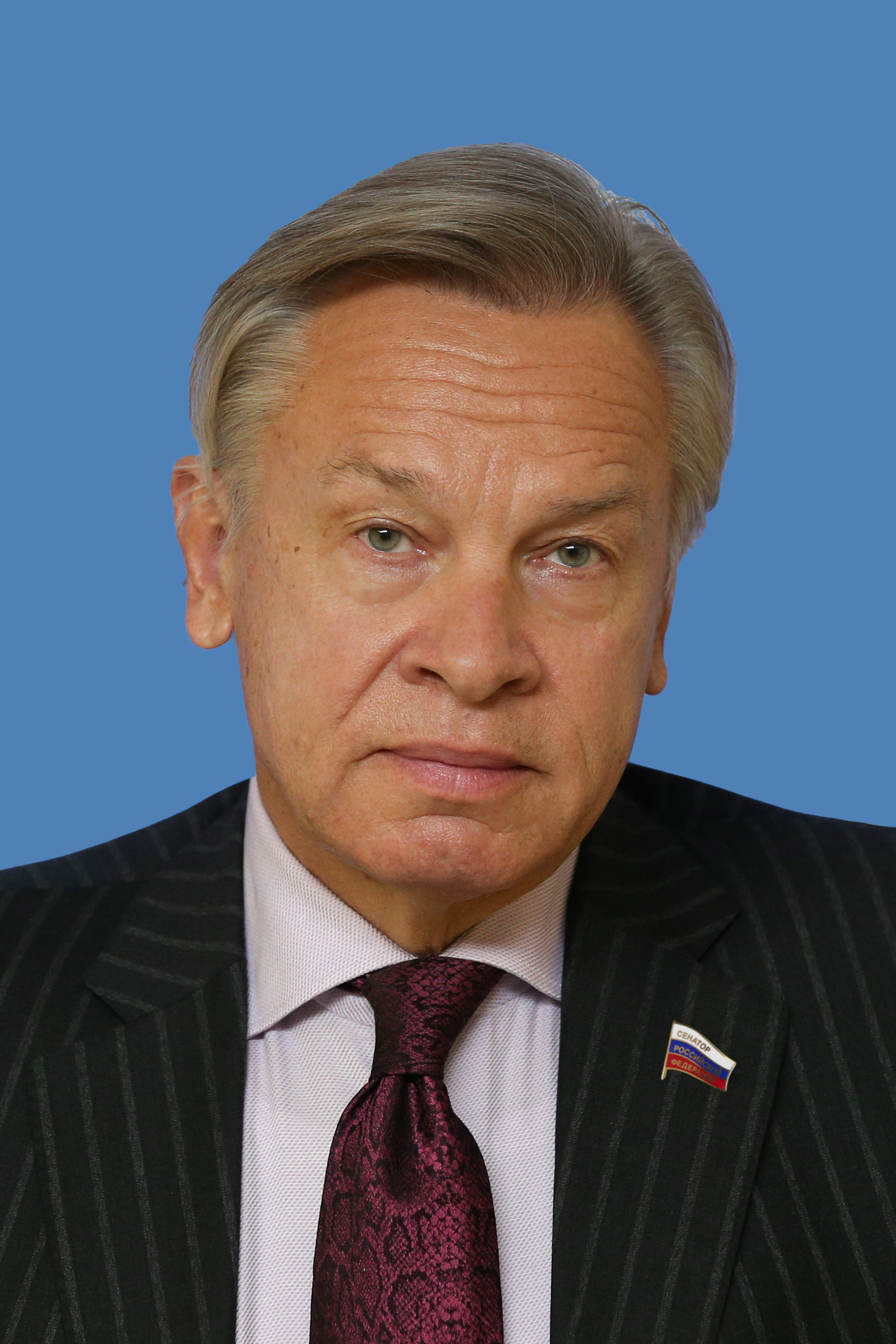

Russian Federation Senator from Perm Krai
- Incumbent
- Assumed office 29 September 2016
- Preceded by: Igor Shubin

Chairman of the Committee on International Affairs of the State Duma
- In office 21 December 2011 – 18 September 2016
- Preceded by: Konstantin Kosachyov
- Succeeded by: Leonid Slutsky

Member of the State Duma
- In office 21 December 2011 – 18 September 2016

Personal details
- Born: Aleksey Konstantinovich Pushkov; 10 August 1954 (age 72) Beijing, China
- Party: United Russia
- Spouse: Nina Pushkova
- Children: Daria Alekseevna Pushkova
- Parents: Konstantin Mikhailovich Pushkov (1921–2019) (father); Margarita Vladimirovna Pushkov (1927–2007) (mother)
- Education: Moscow State Institute of International Relations
- Website: (in Russian) Пушков Алексей Константинович

Aleksey Konstantinovich Pushkov (Russian: Алексе́й Константи́нович Пушко́в; born 10 August 1954) is a Russian politician who has been Senator from Perm Krai since 29 September 2016. He is also a former Deputy of the State Duma and former head of the Committee on International Affairs of the State Duma, the lower house of the Russian Parliament. As a member of the United Russia political party in the federation council, he is the chairman of the Commission on Information Policy.

== Biography ==
Pushkov was born in 1954 to a family of a Soviet diplomats in the capital of China. His father, Konstantin Mikhailovich Pushkov (1921–2019) was an employee of the Consulate General of the USSR in Beijing. His mother, Margarita Vladimirovna Pushkova (1927–2007) was a translator and a teacher of the Chinese language. He studied at the Moscow special school #12 in his youth, graduating in 1972. He graduated from the Moscow State Institute of International Relations in 1976 with a degree in international relations before getting a job at the United Nations mission in Geneva. Between 1988 and 1991, he worked as the speechwriter for Soviet President Mikhail Gorbachev. In 1991–1995, he was deputy editor-in-chief of the Moscow News Weekly in international affairs, editing the English, French, German and Spanish editions of the newspaper. From 2008 to 2011, Pushkov was the Director of the Institute of Contemporary International Studies at the Diplomatic Academy of Russia. He was elected to the State Duma on 4 December 2011 on the United Russia Party list.

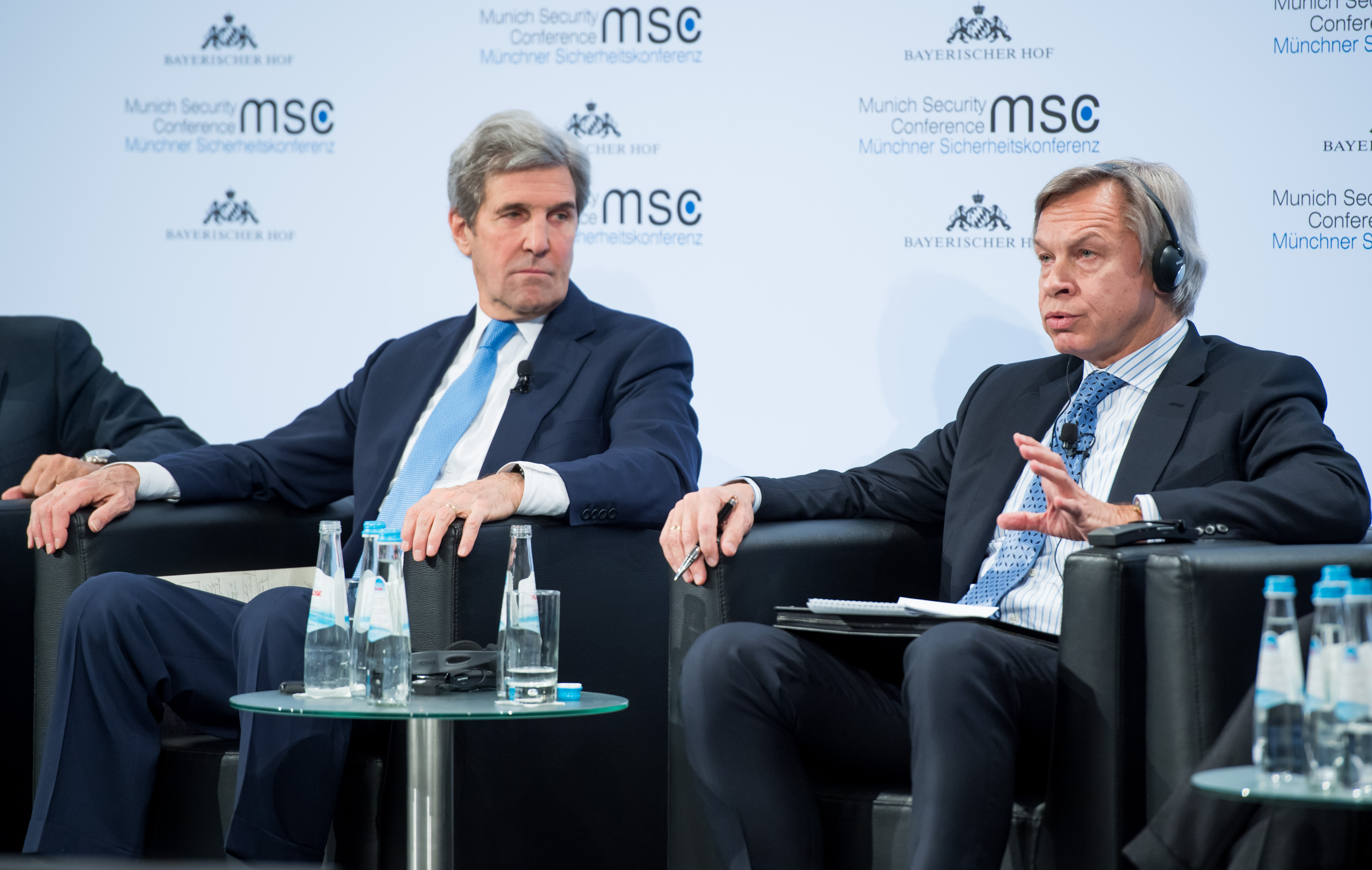
Pushkov and former U.S. Secretary of State John Kerry in 2018

Pushkov is a professor at the Moscow State Institute of International Relations. He has the title of honoris causa from the Moscow University for the Humanities, the Russian-Armenian State University (Yerevan), and the Azerbaijan University of Languages.

Since 1998, Pushkov has been the lead author of the information and analytical program, Postscriptum, on TV channel TV Tsentr.

In 2014, Pushkov suggested that Petro Poroshenko dismiss Andrii Deshchytsia, who was accused by Sergei Lavrov of calling Vladimir Putin a dickhead during the rioting near the Russian Embassy in Ukraine. He also said that if this issue is not resolved, Russia will have the right to cut down gas supplies to the neighboring nation.

Pushkov is fluent in French and English.

=== Sanctions ===
He has been on the list of personal sanctions imposed by the US (since 2014), Canada, Australia, and Ukraine.

He was sanctioned by the UK government in 2022 in relation to the Russo-Ukrainian War.

Pushkov has appeared on a state-run Russian TV station, TV Centre.
