= Jahan Polliyeva =

Russian presidential aide (born 1960)

- Джахан Поллыева
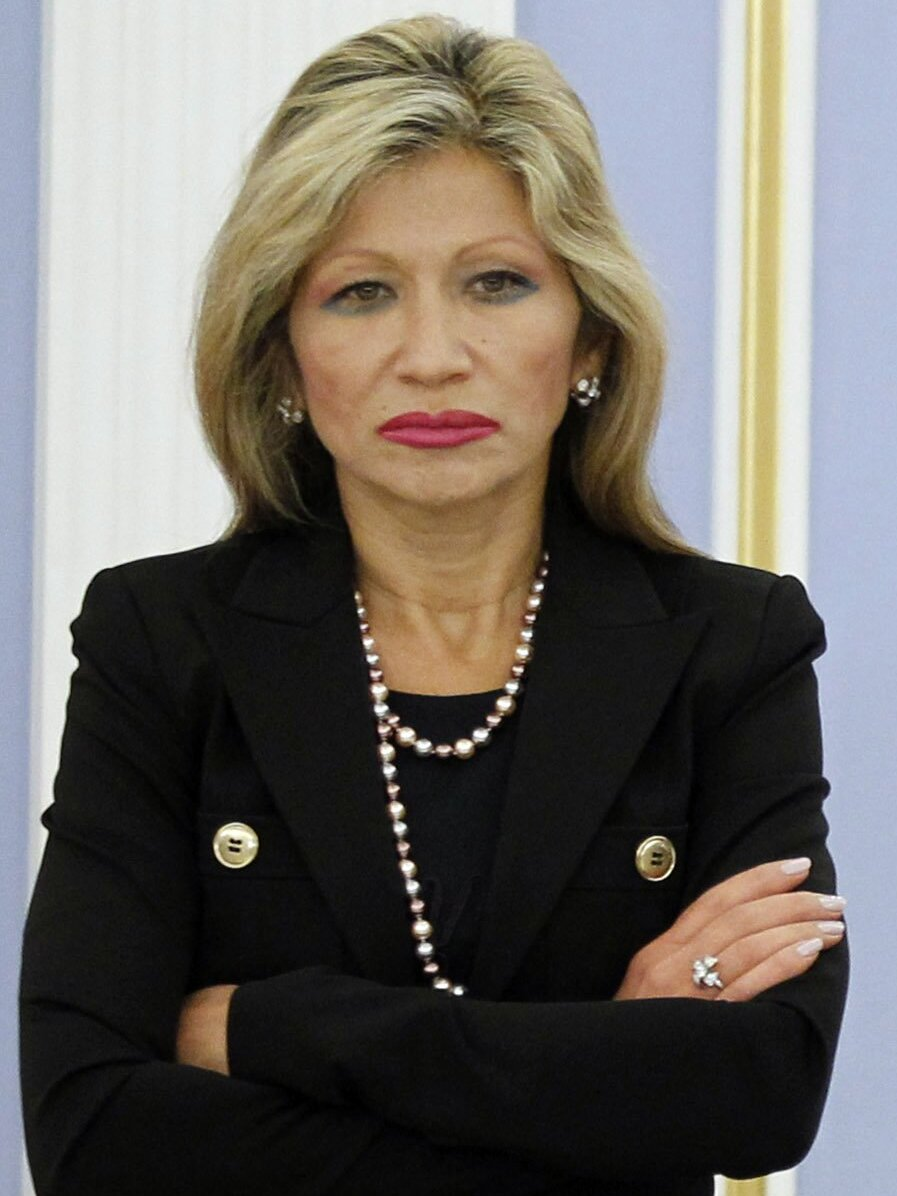
- Polliyeva in 2011

Chief of Staff of the State Duma
- In office January 13, 2012 – October 5, 2016
- Preceded by: Alexey Sigutkin
- Succeeded by: Tatiana Voronova

Aide to the President of Russia
- In office March 2, 2004 – January 13, 2012
- President: Vladimir Putin; Dmitry Medvedev

Personal details
- Born: 15 April 1960 (age 66) Ashgabat, Turkmen SSR (now Turkmenistan) Soviet Union
- Party: United Russia

Jahan Rejepovna Polliyeva (Russian: Джахан Реджеповна Поллыева, romanized: Dzhakhan Redzhepovna Pollyeva; Turkmen: Jahan Rejep-kyzy Pollyýewa; born April 15, 1960) is a Russian statesman, lawyer, songwriter and speechwriter. She is a member of the Writers' Union of Russia. She has the federal state civilian service rank of 1st class Active State Councillor of the Russian Federation.

== Early life ==
Jahan Pollyeva was born on April 15, 1960, in Ashgabat to a family of teachers at the Maxim Gorky Turkmen State University. Her father worked as a teacher of the history of foreign literature, and her mother as an English teacher. Her grandfather taught political economy, and her grandmother was a judge of the Supreme Court of the Turkmen SSR. Pollyeva's second grandfather, who served in the Soviet Army during World War II, died during the Battle of Berlin in April 1945. She later dedicated the song "April", performed by Mark Tishman, to him .

In 1977, she graduated from Secondary School No. 12 in Ashgabat . That same year, she entered the law faculty of the M. Gorky Turkmen State University. Due to her husband (a Komsomol worker) being transferred to Moscow, she was transferred to the law faculty of Moscow State University . She studied in the same year with the future major businessman Alexander Mamut, the head of the State Customs Committee and later Russian Ambassador to Slovenia Mikhail Vanin, and the lawyer and partner in the firm of Henri Reznik. In 1982, she graduated with honors from the MSU Faculty of Law and entered graduate school at the Institute of State and Law, graduating with a Ph.D. in law.

== Early career ==
From 1986–1990, she was a Junior researcher, senior researcher, head of political law department of the Research Center at the Youth Institute of the Central Committee of the Young Communist League and the USSR State Committee of Labor. After this, she was chief analyst and adviser to Moscow City Council of People's Deputies befire becoming Head of Social and Political Analysis and Forecasting Division, and member of the Councillor of State Service's Administrative Board on political issues. She then became from 1992–1993 an Adviser to the Presidential Executive Office and from 1993–1995 an Adviser to the Deputy Prime Minister. From 1995–1997, she was Executive Secretary and Vice President of the Interfax News Agency. In 1997, she was Adviser to First Deputy Prime Minister and Minister of Fuel and Energy.

== Presidential Administration ==
She joined the Presidential Administration in 1997 as Aide to the Kremlin Chief of Staff Anatoly Chubais. That year, she was made Senior Assistant of President Boris Yeltsin. In 1998, she was made Head of the Secretariat of Prime Minister Vladimir Putin. From 1998–2012, she served as Deputy Head of the Presidential Executive Office. From March 2004 – 2012, she was an Aide to the President of the Russian Federation.

== State Duma ==
In January 2012, she became Chief of Staff of the State Duma of Russia. On October 20, 2016, she vacated her post due to the termination of the work of the 6th State Duma, handing over her duties to Tatyana Voronova. After retiring from the civil service, she took up the position of vice president of the joint-stock company United Shipbuilding Corporation in St. Petersburg. She oversees the corporation's interaction with government agencies and public relations.

== Awards ==
- Order "For Merit to the Fatherland", 3rd class
- Order of Honour
- Lenin Komsomol Prize
- Honored Worker of the Arts Industry of the Russian Federation
- Honoured Lawyer of the Russian Federation

== License ==
This article incorporates material from the website of the President of Russia and is used under the Creative Commons and Attribution 4.0 International , 8 April 2015 - on Attribution 3.0 Unported Licence.
