= Pilninsky District =

Pilninsky District Пильнинский район (Russian)
- District
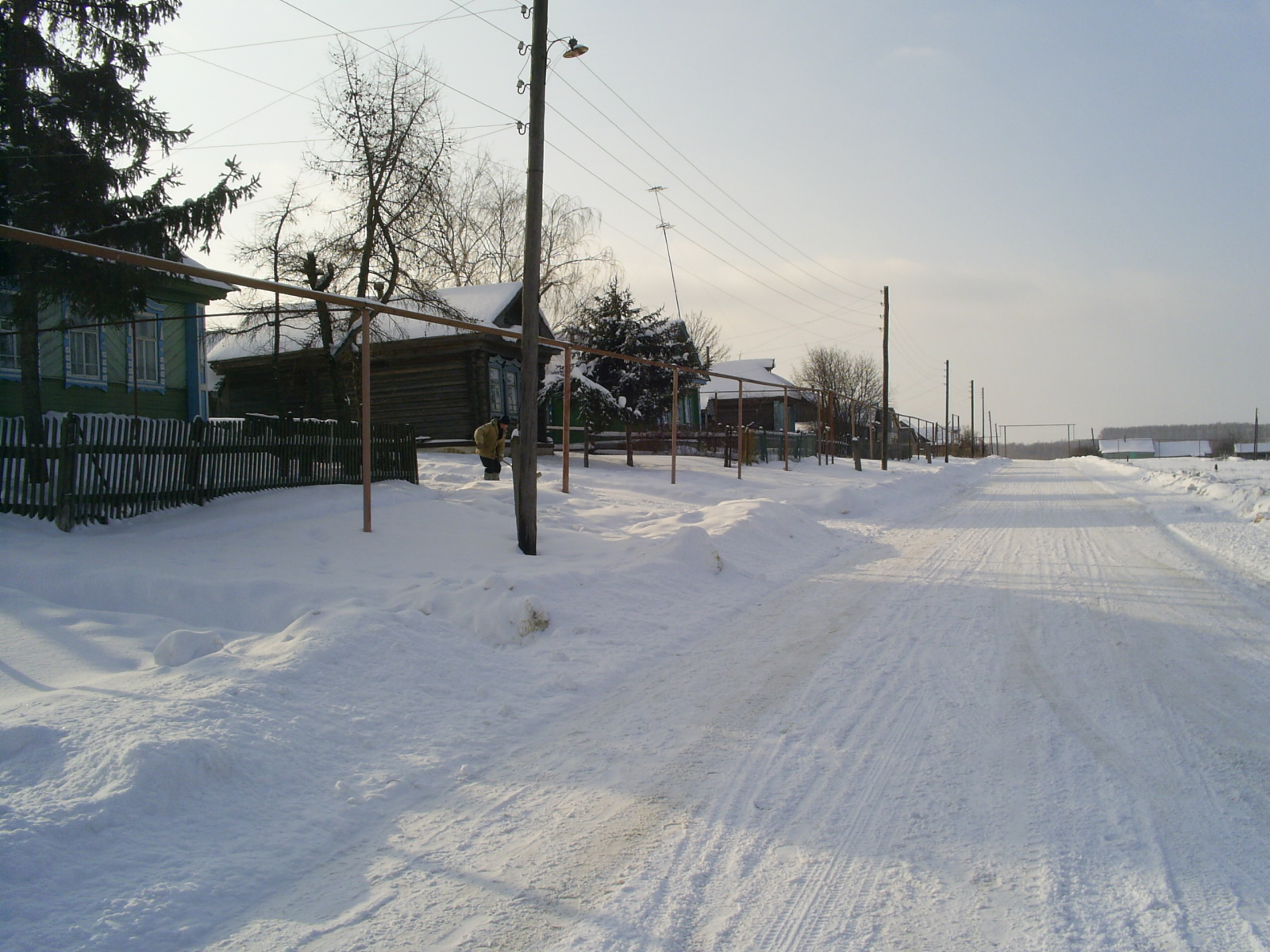
- The selo of Ozhgibovka in Pilninsky District

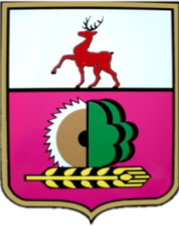
- Coat of arms
- Location of Pilninsky District in Nizhny Novgorod Oblast
- Coordinates: 55°33′N 45°55′E
- Country: Russia
- Federal subject: Nizhny Novgorod Oblast
- Established: 1929
- Administrative center: Pilna

Area
  - Total: 1,312.9 km^{2} (506.9 sq mi)

Population (2010 Census)
  - Total: 21,960
  - Density: 16.73/km^{2} (43.32/sq mi)
  - Urban: 33.4%
  - Rural: 66.6%

Administrative structure
  - Administrative divisions: 1 Work settlements, 11 Selsoviets
  - Inhabited localities: 1 urban-type settlements, 72 rural localities

Municipal structure
  - Municipally incorporated as: Pilninsky Municipal District
  - Municipal divisions: 1 urban settlements, 11 rural settlements
- Time zone: UTC+3 (MSK)
- OKTMO ID: 22545000
- Website: https://pilna.nobl.ru/

Pilninsky District (Russian: Пи́льнинский райо́н) is an administrative district (raion), one of the forty in Nizhny Novgorod Oblast, Russia. Municipally, it is incorporated as Pilninsky Municipal District. It is located in the east of the oblast. The area of the district is 1,312.9 square kilometers (506.9 sq mi). Its administrative center is the urban locality (a work settlement) of Pilna. Population: 21,960 (2010 Census); 25,352 (2002 census); 28,937 (1989 Soviet census). The population of Pilna accounts for 33.4% of the district's total population.

== History ==
The district was established in 1929.

== Notable residents ==
- Vladimir Averchev (1946–2022), politician, born in the village of Maltsevo
- Shaymardan Ibragimov (1899–1957), politician
