= Pilna =

Pilna Пильна
- Urban-type settlement
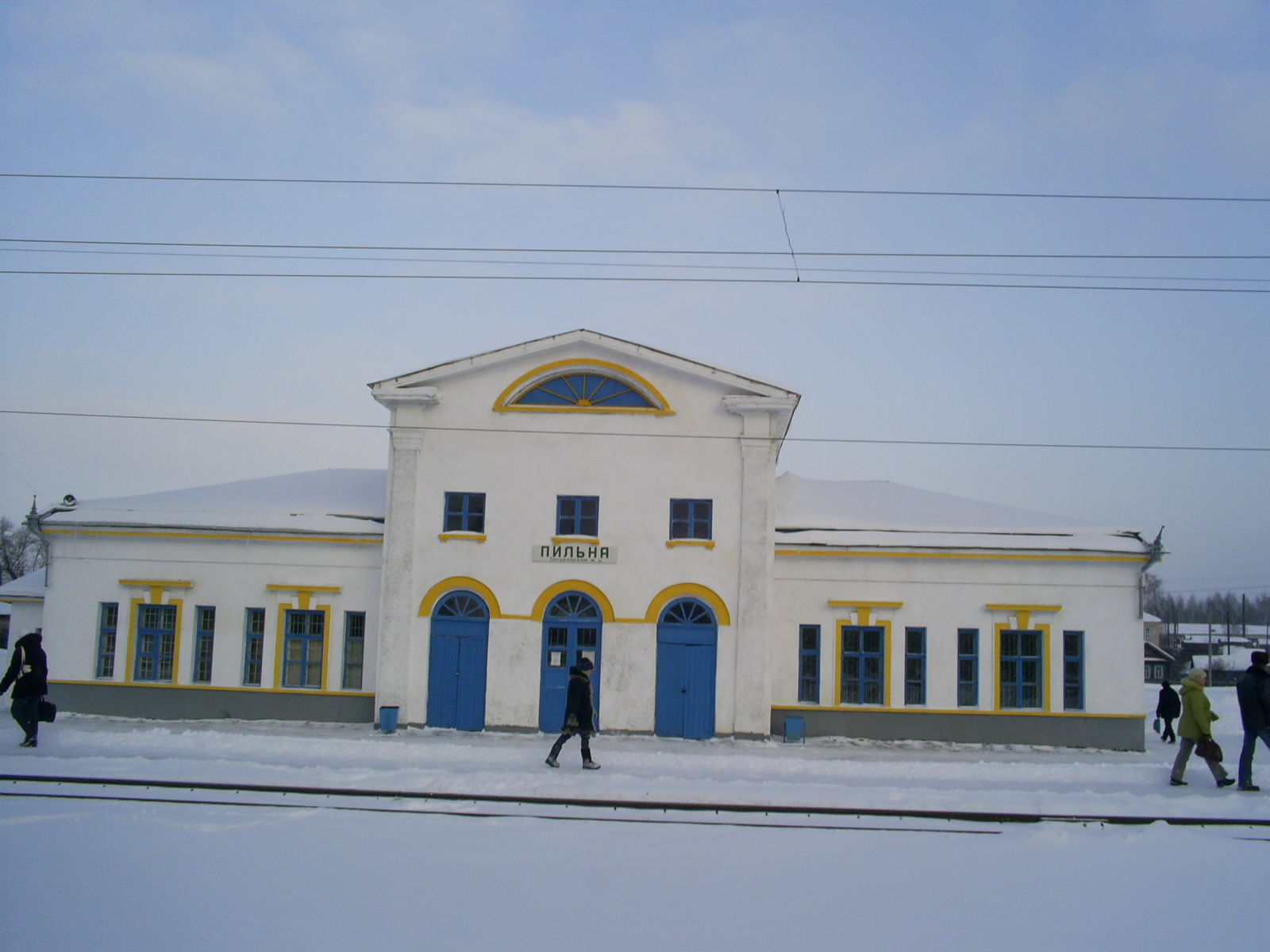
- Interactive map of Pilna
- Location of Pilna Pilna (Nizhny Novgorod Oblast)
- Coordinates: 55.5541°N 45.9223°E
- Country: Russia
- Federal subject: Nizhny Novgorod Oblast
- Administrative district: Pilninsky District
- Founded: 1698

Population (2010 Census)
  - Total: 7,333
  - Estimate (2025): 6,392 (−12.8%)
- Time zone: UTC+3 (MSK)
- Postal codes: 607490, 607491
- OKTMO ID: 22645151051

Pilna (Russian: Пи́льна) is an urban locality (an urban-type settlement) in Pilninsky District of Nizhny Novgorod Oblast, Russia. Population: 7,333 (2010 census); 7,866 (2002 census); 7,478 (1989 Soviet census).
