= Vyacheslav Nikonov =

Russian political scientist (born 1956)

- Вячеслав Никонов
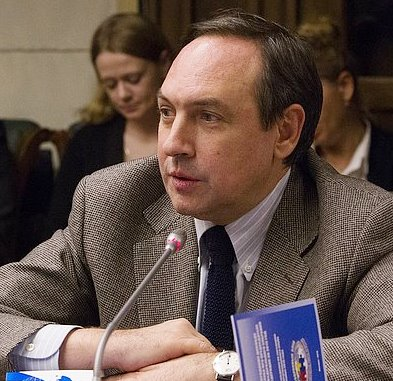
- Nikonov in 2014

Member of the State Duma
- Incumbent
- Assumed office 4 December 2011
- In office 1993–1995

Personal details
- Born: 5 June 1956 (age 70) Moscow, Russian SFSR, Soviet Union
- Party: United Russia
- Spouse: Nina Nikonova
- Education: Moscow State University

Vyacheslav Alekseyevich Nikonov (Russian: Вячеслав Алексеевич Никонов; born 5 June 1956) is a Russian political scientist.

== Early life ==
Nikonov is a grandson of Vyacheslav Molotov, prominent Bolshevik and Soviet foreign minister under Joseph Stalin, whom he was named after, and Polina Zhemchuzhina, a Soviet politician.

== Education ==
Nikonov graduated from the History Department of Moscow State University in 1978 where he studied the history of the Republican Party in the United States after World War II.

In July 2012, Nikonov received an Honorary Doctorate of Letters from the University of Edinburgh, which has since been rescinded.

== Career ==
Nikonov has been involved in Soviet and Russian politics since the 1970s, first as a local Komsomol leader, later in the Communist Party of the Soviet Union, and as a member of Mikhail Gorbachev, Boris Yeltsin, and Vladimir Putin's staff.

In 1993, Nikonov was elected to the State Duma.

In 2005–2007, he was a member of the Public Chamber of Russia.

Since 2007, Nikonov has headed the Russkiy Mir Foundation established by Putin to promote Russian language and culture internationally.

Since 2011, Nikonov has headed School of Public Administration at Moscow State University.

In 2011, he was once again elected to the State Duma, and became the Chairman of the Education Committee in 2013.

== Media ==
In 2005, he published an early biography of Molotov (in Russian). As a biographer of his own grandfather, Nikonov cannot be regarded as an objective source, and he personally recognized this fact in an interview. In the same interview, Nikonov stated to be proud that Molotov was a wise and coolly ruthless man, giving him the right to be listed together with Timur (in the words of Winston Churchill).

During the 2014 Winter Olympics, The Daily Show correspondent Jason Jones engaged Nikonov in a mock interview about Russia–United States relations.

In April 2022, he declared the 2022 Russian invasion of Ukraine to be a holy war and the Russian forces to be the embodiment of good.

== Sanctions ==
On 24 March 2022, the United States Treasury sanctioned Nikonov in response to the 2022 Russian invasion of Ukraine.

In April 2022, the UK government sanctioned Nikonov in relation to the Russo-Ukrainian War.
