= Vladimir Averchev =

Russian politician (1946–2022)

- Владимир Петрович Аверчев
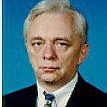

Deputy of the State Duma
- In office 12 December 1993 – 18 January 2000

Personal details
- Born: 1 November 1946 Maltsevo, Pilninsky District, Gorky Oblast, Russian SFSR, Soviet Union
- Died: 24 May 2022 (aged 75) Moscow, Russia
- Party: Yabloko
- Education: Plekhanov Russian University of Economics

Vladimir Petrovich Averchev (Russian: Владимир Петрович Аверчев; 1 November 1946 – 24 May 2022) was a Russian politician. He served as a Deputy of the State Duma for its 1st and 2nd convocations, between 1993 and 2000.

== Family and early life ==
Averchev was born on 1 November 1946 in the village of Maltsevo, Pilninsky District, Gorky Oblast, then part of the Russian Soviet Federative Socialist Republic, in the Soviet Union. He graduated from the Plekhanov Moscow Institute of National Economy as an economist and went to work as a research intern in the Academy of Sciences of the Soviet Union's Institute for US and Canadian Studies from 1970. Over the next 22 years he rose to be a junior researcher, and then senior researcher at the institute, and from 1990 to 1992 was an expert for the Supreme Soviet of Russia's International Affairs Committee. In 1992 he became an advisor to the Russian Embassy in the United States.

== Political career and expert roles ==
In October 1993, Averchev was nominated as a candidate for the elections for the first convocation of the State Duma on the federal list for the Yavlinsky-Boldyrev-Lukin electoral bloc, and was duly elected. He sat for Yabloko for the Duma's 1st and 2nd convocations, between 1993 and 2000, and was a member of the Duma's Committee on International Affairs. Between 2000 and 2001 he was advisor to the president of IBS Holdings, and then in 2001 became advisor to the president of the oil company Sidanko. Between 2003 and 2008 Averchev was research director of BP Russia, and from 2008 to 2010 he was a member of the board of directors of “Black Earth Farming” Ltd. From 2010 to 2013, he served as a leading expert at the Accounts Chamber of Russia, and advisor to the head of the Analytical Center for the Government of the Russian Federation.

== Retirement and death ==
Averchev, who was fluent in English, was the author of a number of scientific publications, and was married, with a daughter. He settled in Moscow, where he was chairman of the supervisory board of the Institute for Humanitarian and Political Studies. He died on 24 May 2022 at the age of 75. Yabloko chairman Nikolay Rybakov offered his condolences, stating that Averchev "believed that only democracy would provide a worthy future for our country."
