= Shamsail Saraliev =

Russian politician

- Шамсаил Саралиев
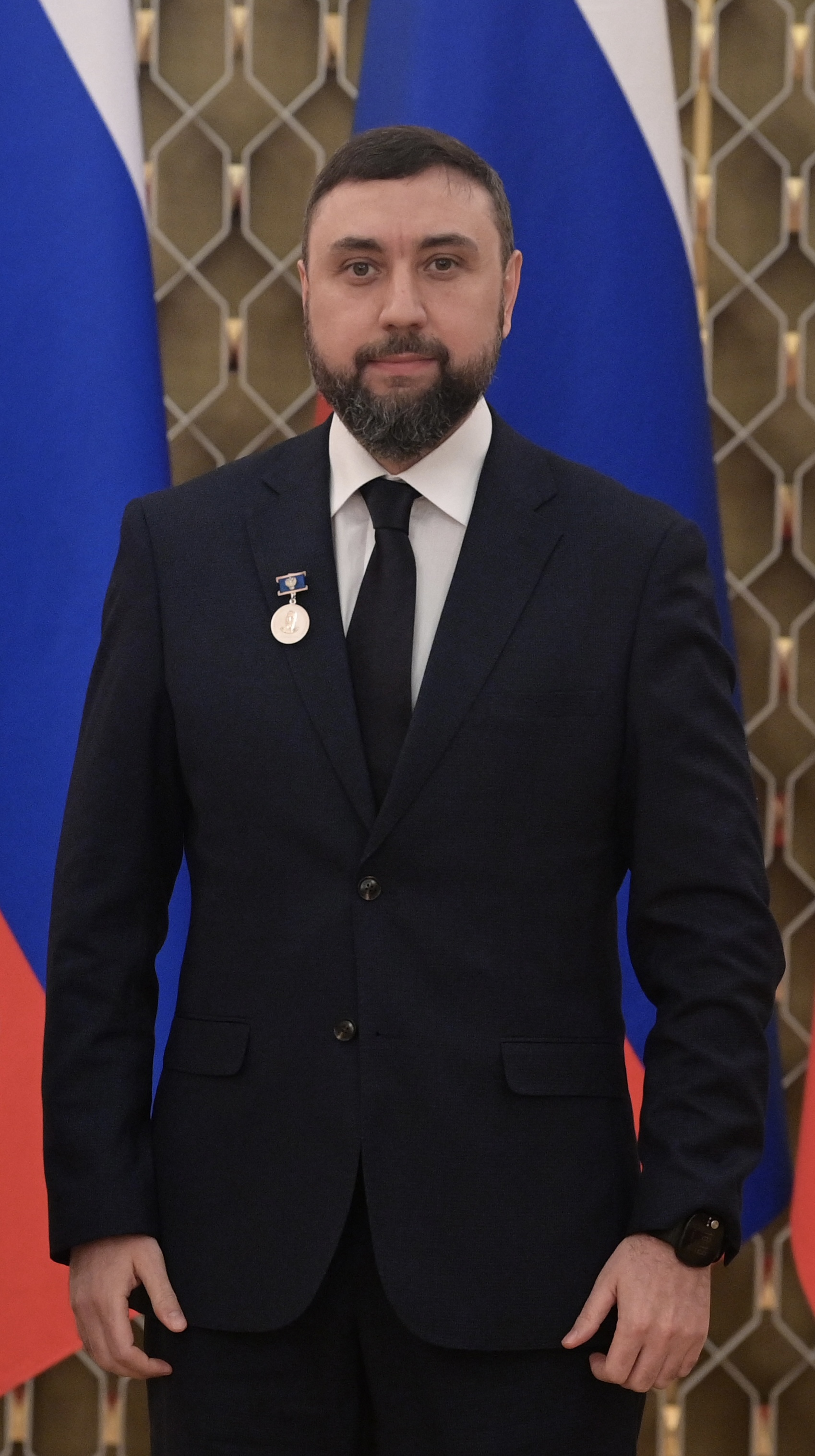

Deputy of the 8th State Duma
- Incumbent
- Assumed office 19 September 2021

Deputy of the 7th State Duma
- In office 5 October 2016 – 12 October 2021

Deputy of the 6th State Duma
- In office 21 December 2011 – 5 October 2016

Personal details
- Born: 5 November 1973 (age 52) Grozny, Checheno-Ingush Autonomous Soviet Socialist Republic, USSR
- Party: United Russia
- Education: Chechen Institute of Management, Chechen State University

Shamsail Saraliev (Russian: Шамсаил Юнусович Саралиев; November 5, 1973, Grozny) is a Russian political figure and deputy of the 8th State Duma.

From 1996 to 2002, Saraliev worked at the joint-stock bank "Exnet" (Grozny branch). In August 2002, he became the consultant to the deputy head of the administration of the Chechen Republic, but already in September, he was appointed acting head of the press service of the head of the Chechen Republic administration. In 2003, Saraliev headed press services of Akhmad Kadyrov. In 2007, he was the adviser to Ramzan Kadyrov. In 2011, he was appointed Minister of the Chechen Republic for External Relations, National Policy, Press and Information. The same year, Saraliev was elected deputy of the 6th State Duma. In 2016 and 2021, he was re-elected for the 7th and 8th State Dumas from the Chechen Republic constituency.

== Sanctions ==
He was sanctioned by the UK government in 2022 in relation to the Russo-Ukrainian War.

On 24 March 2022, the United States Treasury sanctioned him in response to the 2022 Russian invasion of Ukraine.
