= Aleksandr Shabanov =

Russian chemist and politician (1935–2023)

Member of the State Duma
- In office 17 December 1995 – 7 December 2003

Personal details
- Born: Aleksandr Alexandrovich Shabanov; 5 November 1935 Moscow, Russian SFSR, USSR
- Died: 8 January 2023 (aged 87) Moscow, Russia
- Party: CPRF; CPCR
- Education: MSU Faculty of Chemistry
- Occupation: Chemist

Aleksandr Alexandrovich Shabanov (Russian: Александр Александрович Шабанов; 5 November 1935 – 8 January 2023) was a Russian chemist and politician. A member of the Communist Party of the Russian Federation, he served in the State Duma from 1995 to 2003.

Shabanov died in Moscow on 8 January 2023, at the age of 87.

Sergey Yastrzhembsky is married to his niece.
