= Alexander Kozlovsky (politician, born 1944) =

Russian politician

- Александр Козловский
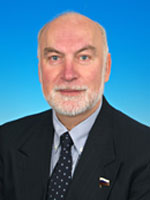

Deputy of the 5th State Duma
- In office 24 December 2007 – 21 December 2011

Deputy of the 4th State Duma
- In office 29 December 2003 – 24 December 2007

Personal details
- Born: 1 September 1944 (age 82) Leningrad, Russian Soviet Federative Socialist Republic, USSR
- Party: United Russia
- Education: St. Petersburg State University of Telecommunications

Alexander Kozlovsky (Russian: Александр Александрович Козловский; September 1, 1944, Leningrad) is a Russian political figure and deputy of the 4th and 5th State Dumas.

From 1970 to 1976, Kozlovsky worked as an instructor at the Komsomol. In 1976–1981, he held the positions of the Deputy Head of the International Department, Assistant to the Deputy Chairman of the Council of Ministers of the USSR, and Chairman of the Organizing Committee on 1980 Summer Olympics. For the next five years, Kozlovsly served as the Senior Referent of the Apparatus of the Council of Ministers of the Soviet Union, Executive Secretary of the Commission of the Presidium of the Council of Ministers of the USSR on Environmental Protection and Rational Use of Natural Resources. In 1991–1992, he served as Deputy Chairman of the Soviet Olympic Committee. In 2003 and 2007, he was elected deputy of the 4th and 5th State Dumas, respectively.

On November 23, 2013, Kozlovsky became a member of the executive committee of the European Olympic Committees.

== Awards ==
- Order of the Badge of Honour
- Order of Friendship of Peoples
- Olympic Order
- Medal "In Commemoration of the 1000th Anniversary of Kazan"
- Jubilee Medal "In Commemoration of the 100th Anniversary of the Birth of Vladimir Ilyich Lenin"
