= Tatiana Voronova (politician) =

Russian politician (born 1975)

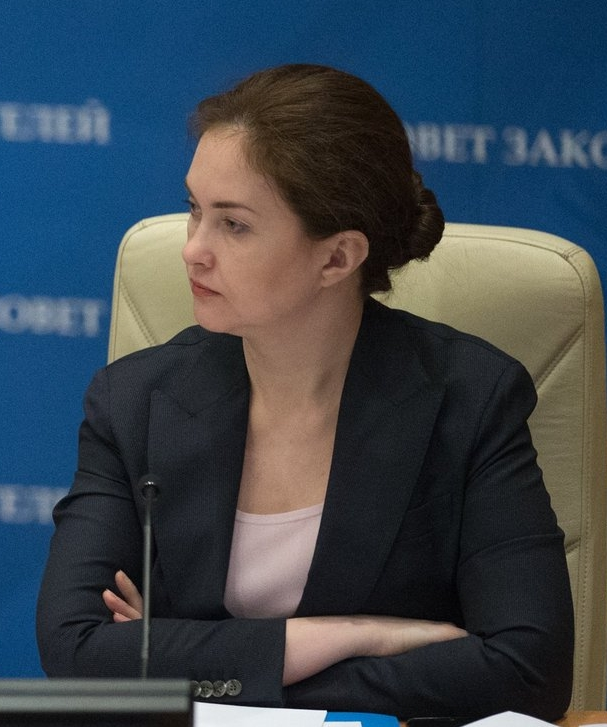
- Voronova in 2017

Member of the State Duma
- In office 24 December 2007 – 21 December 2011

Personal details
- Born: 30 March 1975 (age 51) Taishet, Irkutsk Oblast, RSFSR, USSR
- Party: United Russia

Tatiana Gennadievna Voronova (Russian: Татьяна Геннадьевна Воронова; born 30 March 1975) is a Russian politician. From 2007 to 2011, she was a member of the State Duma. From 2016 to 2021, she served as chief of staff of the State Duma.
