= Konstantin Kosachev =

Russian politician and diplomat

- Константин Косачев
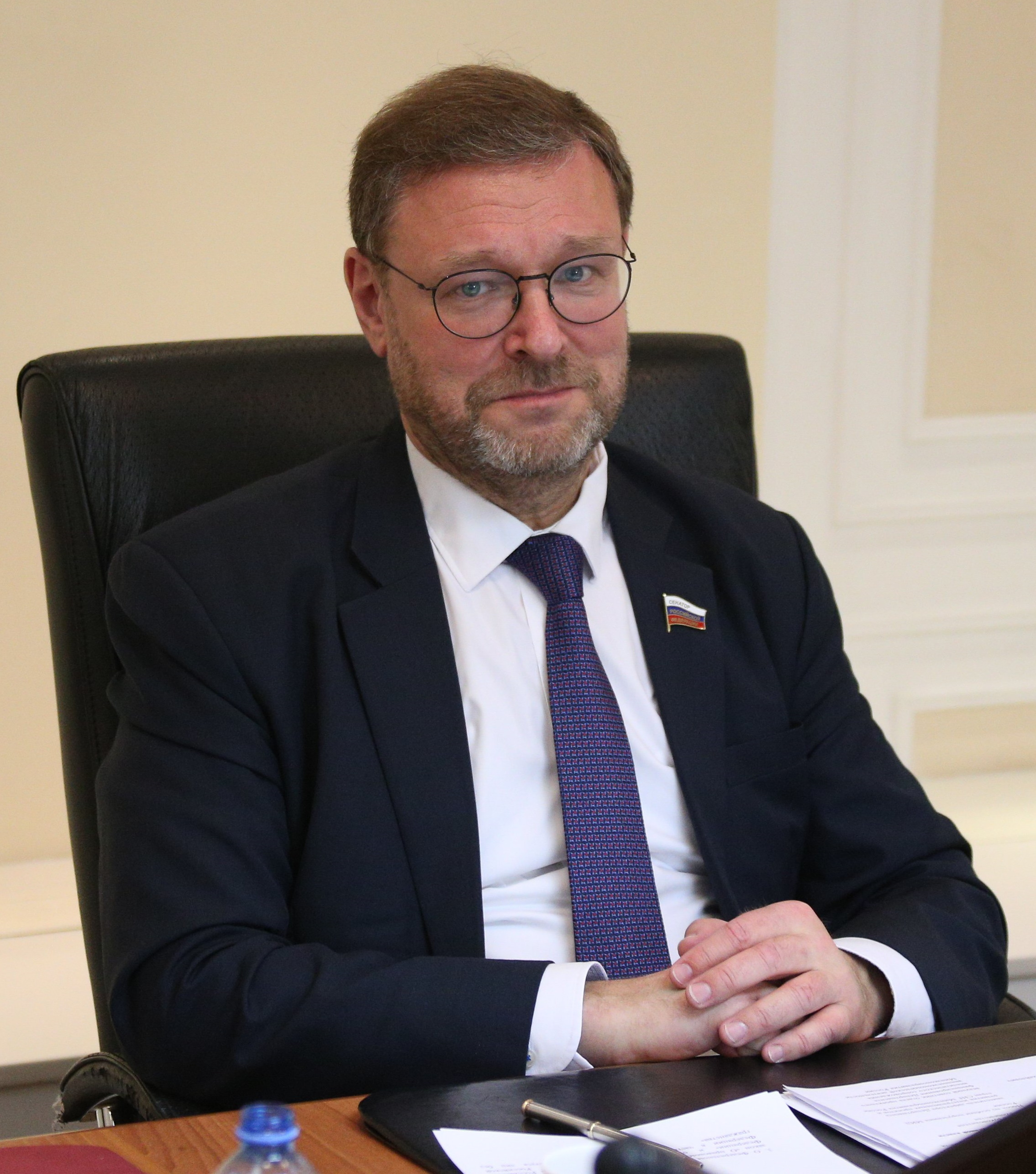
- Kosachev in 2021

Chair of the Foreign Affairs Committee of the Federation Council
- Incumbent
- Assumed office 25 December 2015

Russian Federation Senator from the Mari El Republic
- Incumbent
- Assumed office 21 September 2015
- Preceded by: Svetlana Solntseva

Russian Federation Senator from the Chuvash Republic
- In office 15 December 2014 – 15 September 2015
- Preceded by: Galina Nikolayeva
- Succeeded by: Nikolay Fyodorov

Head of Rossotrudnichestvo
- In office 5 March 2012 – 22 December 2014

Member of the State Duma
- In office 19 December 1999 – 21 December 2011

Personal details
- Born: Konstantin Iosifovich Kosachev; 17 September 1962 (age 64) Moscow Oblast, USSR
- Party: United Russia
- Spouse: Lyudmila Kosachev
- Children: 3
- Education: MGIMO; MFA Diplomatic Academy
- Profession: Politician, diplomat

Konstantin Iosifovich Kosachev (Russian: Константин Иосифович Косачев; born 17 September 1962) is a Russian politician and former diplomat. He is a senator at the Federation Council (Russian parliament's upper house) and chairs its Foreign Affairs Committee. He has been on the US sanctions list since 2018.

After graduating from the Moscow State Institute of International Relations, Kosachev was a diplomat at the Russian Embassy in Sweden. He was elected to the State Duma in 1999. He was appointed head of Rossotrudnichestvo in 2012. In December 2014, he became a member of the Federation Council.

== Early life and education ==
Konstantin Kosachev was born in the Pushkin district of Moscow Oblast on 17 September 1962 to Nina G. and Joseph Artemyevitch Kosachev, a diplomat who worked in the Ministry of Foreign Affairs of the USSR. He lived in Sweden eight years and attended school there. He later studied in Moscow, graduating in 1979.

In 1984, Kosachev graduated from the Moscow State Institute of International Relations. He is fluent in Swedish and English. As a translator, Kosachev worked in various diplomatic posts in the central and foreign offices of the Ministry of Foreign Affairs of the USSR and Russia. In 1991 he graduated from training at the Diplomatic Academy of the Ministry of Foreign Affairs.

== Diplomatic career ==
Kosachev became first secretary of Russian embassy in Sweden in 1991. He was named advisor to the embassy in 1994. Kosachev participated in several international conferences on European security and disarmament. He was part of an advisory group to Russia's minister of foreign affairs. He was also deputy director of the 2nd European Department of the Russian foreign ministry, in charge of implementing Russian foreign policy in the Nordic area.

From May 1998 Kosachev was first an adviser, then an assistant for international affairs to the prime minister (under Sergey Kiriyenko, Yevgeny Primakov, and Sergei Stepashin). He also served as secretariat of the chairman of the Government of the Russian Federation.

== Political career ==
=== State Duma deputy ===
From 19 December 1999 to December 2003, Kosachev was a deputy of the 3rd State Duma of the Russian Federation, the first deputy head of the Fatherland – All Russia political faction, and deputy chairman of the Foreign Affairs Committee. Kosachev was a member of the Commissions to assist the Federal Republic of Yugoslavia in overcoming the consequences of the NATO bombing, to implement the Anti-Ballistic Missile Treaty between the Russian Federation, the Comprehensive Nuclear-Test-Ban Treaty (CTBT) and to conclude a new treaty on further reduction and limitation of strategic offensive arms (New START).

In 2003, Kosachev defended his Ph.D. thesis on "The concept of development of international law in the fight against nuclear terrorism" at the Diplomatic Academy of the Ministry of Foreign Affairs.

From 2003 to 2007, Kosachev was deputy of the 4th State Duma of the Russian Federation and part of the United Russia party. He served as Chairman of the State Duma Foreign Affairs Committee. In 2005, Kosachev wrote an article entitled "Why Would a Bear Need Wings", challenging then-Chairman of the State Duma Boris Gryzlov's position that the United Russia party did not need working groups.

On 2 December 2007, he was elected deputy of the 5th State Duma of the Russian Federation and continued to chair the State Duma Foreign Affairs Committee.

On 4 December 2011, Kosachev was elected deputy of the 6th State Duma of the Russian Federation. He was elected deputy chairman of the State Duma Foreign Affairs Committee.

=== Rossotrudnichestvo ===
On 5 March 2012, Vladimir Putin appointed Kosachev head of Rossotrudnichestvo, the federal agency for the Commonwealth of Independent States, Compatriots Living Abroad and International Humanitarian Cooperation and the Russian president's special envoy for relations with CIS member-states.

=== Federation Council ===
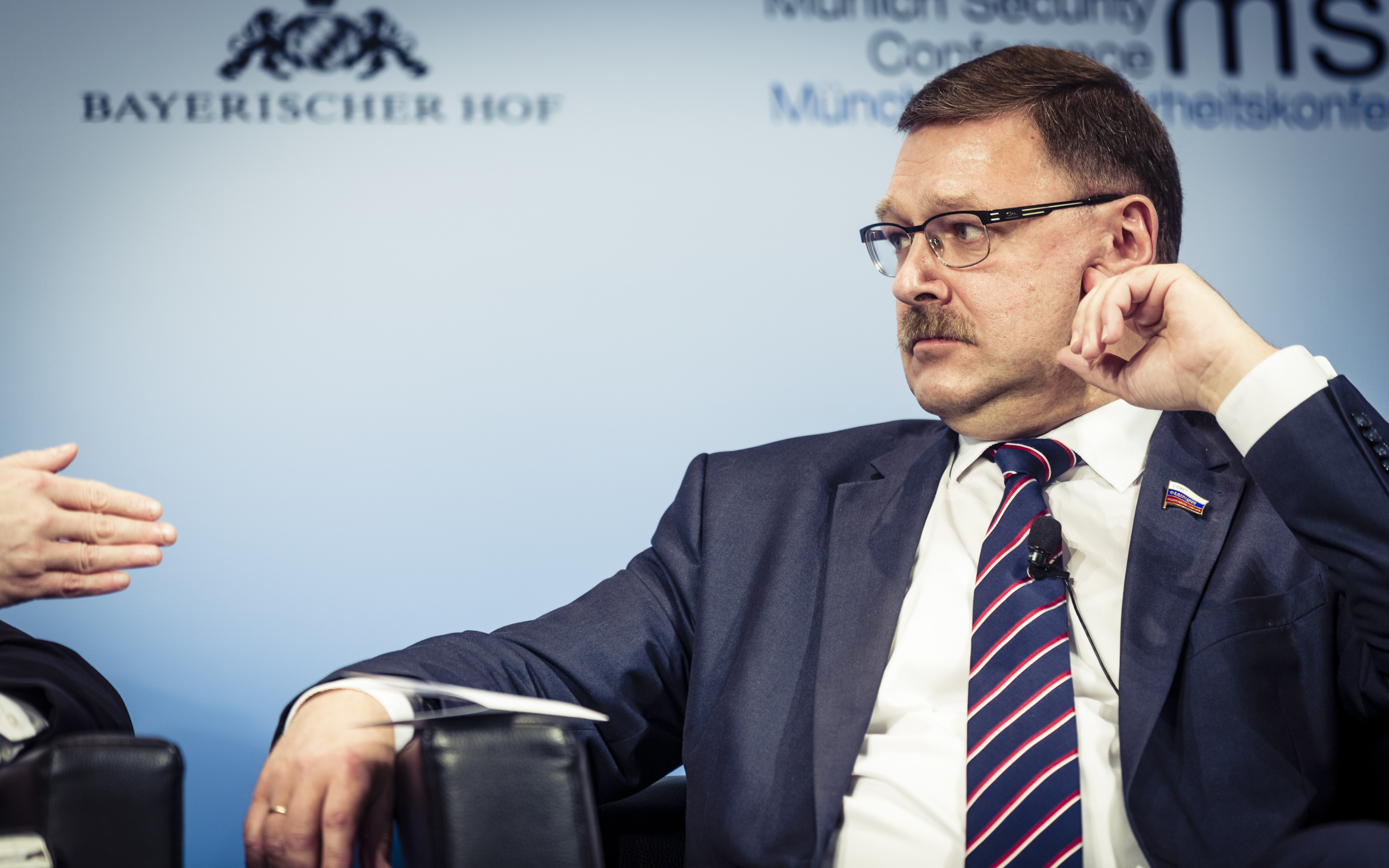
Kosachev at the Munich Security Conference in 2017

On 18 December 2014, Kosachev was appointed Federation Council representative by the heads of the Chuvash Republic. A week later, on 25 December 2014, he was elected Chairman of the Federation Council Committee on International Affairs.

On 21 September 2015, Kosachev was named representative of the Government of the Mari El Republic in the Russian Federation Council.

=== Sanctions ===
In September 2015 Kosachev was included in the sanctions list of individuals and entities adopted the National Security and Defense Council of Ukraine.

In April 2018, the United States imposed sanctions on him and 23 other Russian nationals.

He was sanctioned by the UK government in 2022 in relation to the Russo-Ukrainian War.

=== Parliamentary Assembly of the Council of Europe ===
Kosachev headed the State Duma's delegation to the Parliamentary Assembly of the Council of Europe (PACE) from 2004 to 2012. He served as vice-speaker of PACE and coordinated a deputy group for relations with the Swedish Parliament. When considering the 2006 resolution condemning communist regimes, Kosachev declared it inadmissible to equate communism and Nazism: "It is impossible to equate the communist ideology and the ideology of Nazism".

== Political views ==
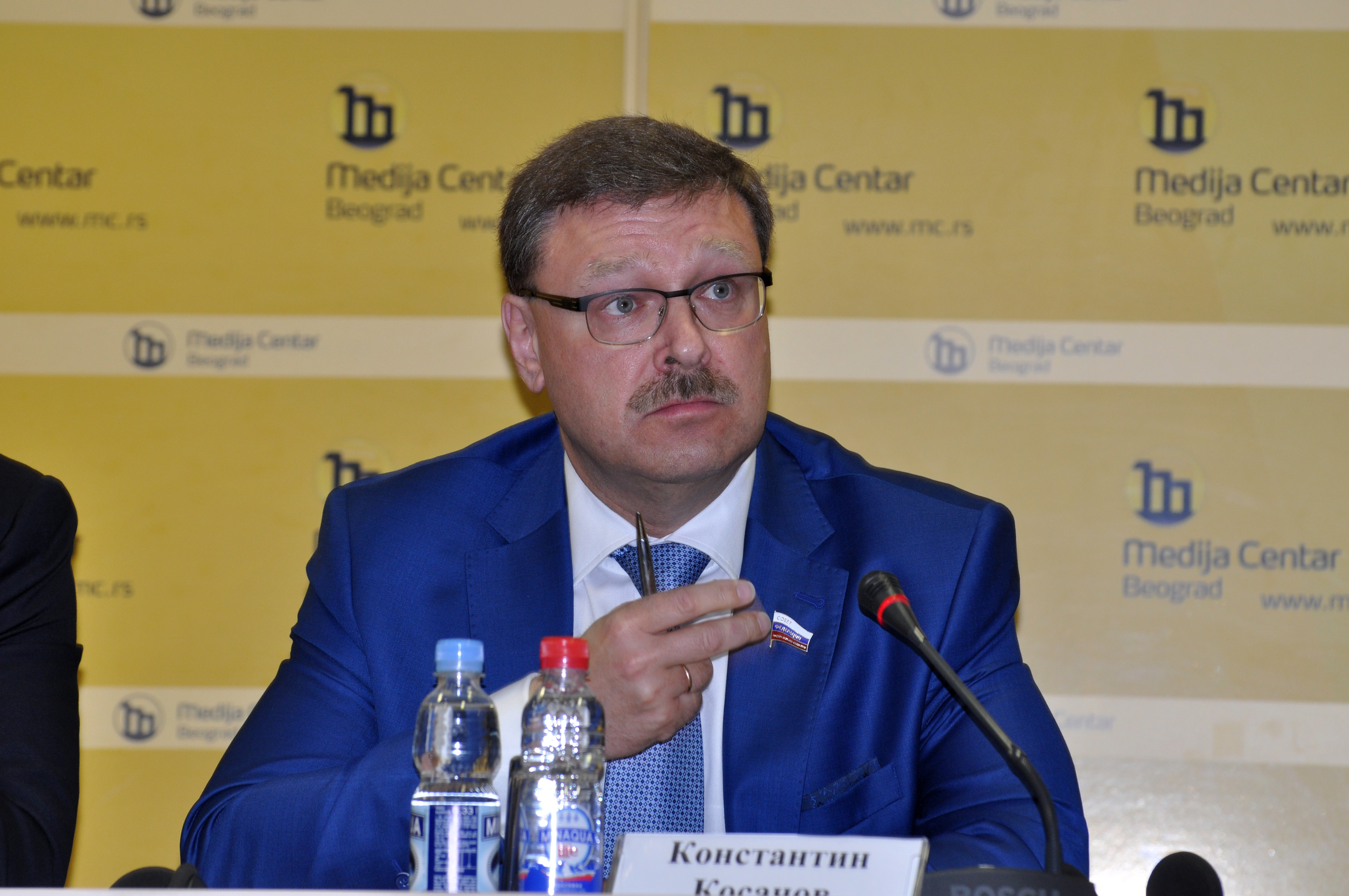
Kosachev in 2016

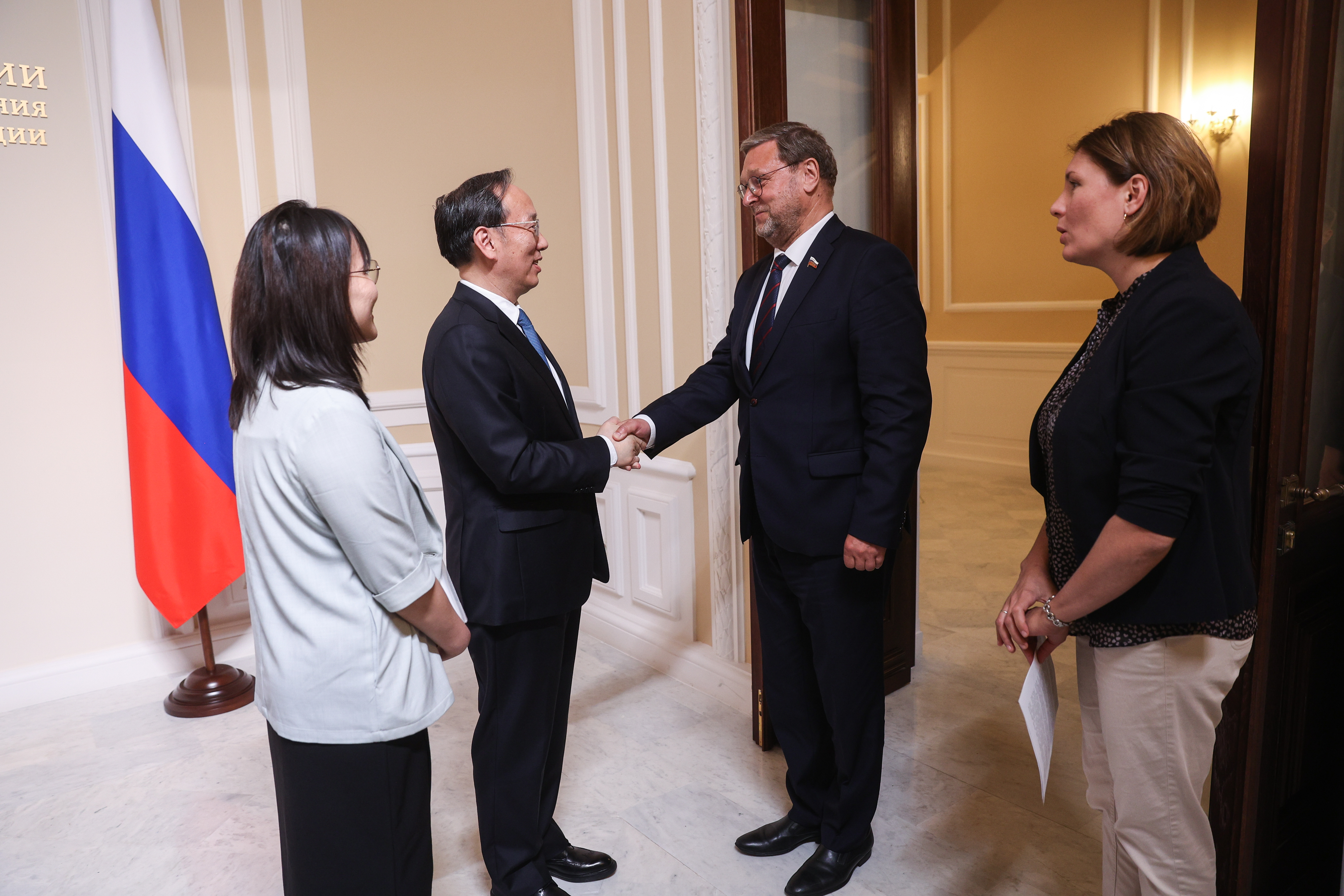
Koshachev with Chinese politician Li Lecheng on 4 June 2024

In June 2010, Kosachev wrote an article for the Echo of Moscow website proposing that the Russian Federation devise set of principles or a historical doctrine whereby it could disclaim any financial, legal, political or moral responsibility for USSR's actions in former territories while still acting as a successor state.

In November 2011, he expressed the view that the European Monetary Union (euro zone) exclude Greece, Hungary, Portugal, Ireland, Spain, Italy and Latvia, because these countries have a huge government debt. At that time, neither Latvia nor Hungary were part of the Eurozone.

Kosachev opposes Russian ratification of Article 20 of the United Nations Convention against Corruption. He believes that the 20th article contradicts Article 49 of the Constitution of the Russian Federation and could deprive millions of Russian citizens of the presumption of innocence.

In February 2017, following the resignation of Michael T. Flynn as national security adviser, Kosachev opined that Russophobia was pandemic in Donald Trump's administration.

Kosachev spread the Ukraine bioweapons conspiracy theory, claiming without evidence that Ukrainians were being turned into genetically modified super soldiers in the alleged laboratories in Ukraine.

In September 2022, Kosachev warned that after the annexation referendums in Russian-occupied Ukraine, "protecting people in this region will not be our right, but our duty. An attack on people and territories will be an attack on Russia. With all the consequences."

In March 2025, Kosachev responded to US President Donald Trump's attempts to negotiate a ceasefire in the Russo-Ukrainian war, saying that "Russia is advancing [on the battlefield], so it will be different with Russia. Any agreements should be on our terms, not American."

== Awards and honors ==
- Order "For Merit to the Fatherland" 4th degree (20 April 2006) - for active participation in legislative work and many years of diligent work
- Order of Honour (7 December 2012) - for his great contribution to the preservation, promotion and development of Russian culture, education and the Russian language abroad
- Order of Friendship (21 January 2003) - for strengthening the rule of law, active legislative activity, and many years of diligent work
- Commander of the Order of the Polar Star (Sweden, 2004).
- Order of Friendship (South Ossetia, 17 October 2009) - for his great contribution to the maintenance of peace and stability in the Caucasus, strengthening of inter-parliamentary relations and active in championing the interests of the Republic of South Ossetia in the Parliamentary Assembly of the Council of Europe
- Medal of the Order "For Services to the Chuvash Republic" (10 March 2012) - for long-term work to defend the interests of the Chuvash Republic in the State Duma
- Honorary Doctor of Chuvash State University (28 March 2007)
- Honorary Doctor of the Institute of International Law and Economics. Griboyedov (2008)
- Samara Cross (Bulgarian Public Council)
- Order of Honour (South Ossetia, 14 April 2016)
- Envoy Extraordinary and Plenipotentiary Class 2 (29 September 1999)
- Ambassador Extraordinary and Plenipotentiary (1 December 2009)
- Acting State Advisor of the Russian Federation, Class 2 (25 January 1999)

Kosachev is a member of the Alexander Gorchakov Public Diplomacy Fund's Management Board.

== Personal life ==
Kosachev met his wife, Lyudmila Muranova (b. 1958) in Sweden. They have three children.
