= The Fifth Estate (film) =

2013 thriller film by Bill Condon

- Theatrical release poster
- Directed by: Bill Condon
- Screenplay by: Josh Singer
- Based on: Inside WikiLeaks by Daniel Domscheit-Berg WikiLeaks by David Leigh and Luke Harding
- Produced by: Steve Golin; Bard Dorros; Michael Sugar
- Starring: Benedict Cumberbatch; Daniel Brühl; Anthony Mackie; David Thewlis; Alicia Vikander; Stanley Tucci; Laura Linney
- Cinematography: Tobias A. Schliessler
- Edited by: Virginia Katz
- Music by: Carter Burwell
- Production companies: DreamWorks Pictures; Reliance Entertainment; Participant Media; Anonymous Content
- Distributed by: Walt Disney Studios Motion Pictures (Note: Distributed by Walt Disney Studios Motion Pictures through the Touchstone Pictures banner.) (Worldwide); Reliance Distribution (India); Mister Smith Entertainment (EMEA)
- Release dates: September 5, 2013 (TIFF); October 18, 2013 (United States); October 25, 2013 (India)
- Running time: 128 minutes
- Countries: United States; India
- Language: English
- Budget: $28 million
- Box office: $8.6 million

The Fifth Estate is a 2013 biographical thriller film directed by Bill Condon about the news-leaking website WikiLeaks. The film stars Benedict Cumberbatch as its editor-in-chief and founder Julian Assange and Daniel Brühl as its former spokesperson Daniel Domscheit-Berg. Anthony Mackie, David Thewlis, Alicia Vikander, Stanley Tucci, and Laura Linney are featured in supporting roles. The film's screenplay was written by Josh Singer based in-part on Domscheit-Berg's book Inside WikiLeaks: My Time with Julian Assange at the World's Most Dangerous Website (2011), as well as WikiLeaks: Inside Julian Assange's War on Secrecy (2011) by British journalists David Leigh and Luke Harding. The film's name is a reference to people who operate in the manner of journalists outside the normal constraints imposed on the mainstream media.

Co-produced by DreamWorks Pictures and Participant Media, The Fifth Estate premiered at the 2013 Toronto International Film Festival and was distributed theatrically by Walt Disney Studios Motion Pictures through the Touchstone Pictures label in the United States on October 18, 2013, with international distribution divided among Disney, Reliance Entertainment, and independent arrangements by Mister Smith Entertainment. The film performed poorly at the box office and garnered mixed critical reaction, receiving criticism for its screenplay and direction, although the acting was praised, particularly Cumberbatch's performance.

== Plot ==
The story opens in 2010, with the release of the Afghan War Logs. It then flashes back to 2007, where journalist Daniel Domscheit-Berg meets Australian journalist Julian Assange for the first time, at the Chaos Communication Congress in Berlin. Daniel's interest in online activism has led him to Assange, with whom he has corresponded by email. They begin working together on WikiLeaks, a website devoted to releasing information being withheld from the public while retaining anonymity for its sources. Their first major target is a private Swiss bank, Julius Baer, whose Cayman Islands branch has been engaged in illegal activities. Despite Baer's filing of a lawsuit and obtaining an injunction, the judge dissolves the injunction, allowing Julian and Daniel to reclaim the domain name. As their confidence increases, the two push forward in publishing information over the next three years, including secrets on Scientology, revealing Sarah Palin's email account, and the membership list of the British National Party.

At first Daniel enjoys changing the world, viewing WikiLeaks as a noble enterprise and Assange as a mentor. However, the relationship between the two becomes strained over time. Daniel loses his job and problems arise in his relationship, particularly concerning the BNP membership leak, which also revealed the addresses of the people involved, and caused several to lose their jobs. Assange openly mocks Daniel's concerns about these issues, implying his own life has been more troubling. Assange's abrasive manner and actions, such as abandoning Daniel at his parents' house after having accepted their dinner invitation, only deepen the strain further.

Interspersed throughout the film are flashbacks hinting at Assange's troubled childhood and involvement in a suspicious cult, and that Assange's obsession with WikiLeaks has more to do with childhood trauma than wanting to improve the world. Daniel begins to fear that Assange may be closer to a con man than a mentor. He also notices that Assange constantly gives different stories about why his hair is white. Assange at first tells Daniel that WikiLeaks has hundreds of workers, but Daniel later finds out that Daniel and Assange are the only members.

Most importantly to Daniel, Assange frequently says that protecting sources is the website's number one goal. However, Daniel begins to suspect that Assange only cares about protecting sources so people will come forward and that Assange does not actually care who gets hurt by the website, though Assange says that the harm the website may cause is outweighed by good the leaks create. Daniel's girlfriend tells him that she believes in his cause, but that it's his job to prevent Assange from going too far.

The tensions come to a head when Bradley Manning (later known as Chelsea Manning) leaks hundreds of thousands of documents to WikiLeaks, including the "Collateral Murder" video of an airstrike in Baghdad, the Afghan and Iraq War Logs, and 250,000 US Diplomatic Cables. Assange wants to leak the documents immediately, but Daniel insists that they review the documents first. Later, several major newspapers agree to cooperate with WikiLeaks in releasing the documents while spinning WikiLeaks positively. However, both Daniel and the newspapers require the names in the documents be redacted both to protect sources and to assist in the media spin, to which Assange reluctantly agrees.

Daniel realizes that Assange has no intention of following through on this promise and is grooming a right-hand man to replace Daniel. The newspapers release the redacted documents. The resulting media and public uproar forces informants to flee from their countries of residence and many U.S. diplomats to resign. Before Assange can go further, however, Daniel and the other members of the original WikiLeaks team delete the site and block Assange's access to the server.

Daniel later talks with a reporter from The Guardian, and the two fear that giving Assange such a large platform was a mistake. The reporter tells Daniel that while Assange may be untrustworthy, he had done a good thing by uncovering secret dealing in the government and business world and attempting to protect sources. Daniel also reveals the real reason for Assange's hair colour—that it had been a custom of the cult he had been part of in Australia—and reports that he once accidentally discovered Assange dyeing it that colour.

It is revealed that WikiLeaks is continuing to leak information (with Assange implied to have either regained the site or rebuilt it), and the Manning documents were released with no redactions. Daniel has written a book on his involvement with the organization on which this film was based, and Assange has threatened to sue in retaliation. Assange is shown to be living in the Ecuadorian embassy in London to avoid arrest on an outstanding warrant for alleged sex crimes. In an interview, he denounces the two upcoming WikiLeaks films, stating that they will be factually inaccurate (having been partly based on Daniel's book). He says that all institutions are fallible but that hiring Daniel was the one mistake he made.

== Cast ==
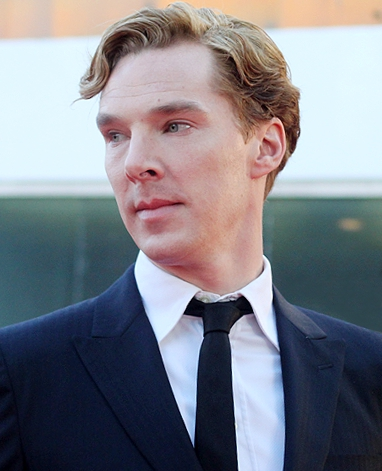
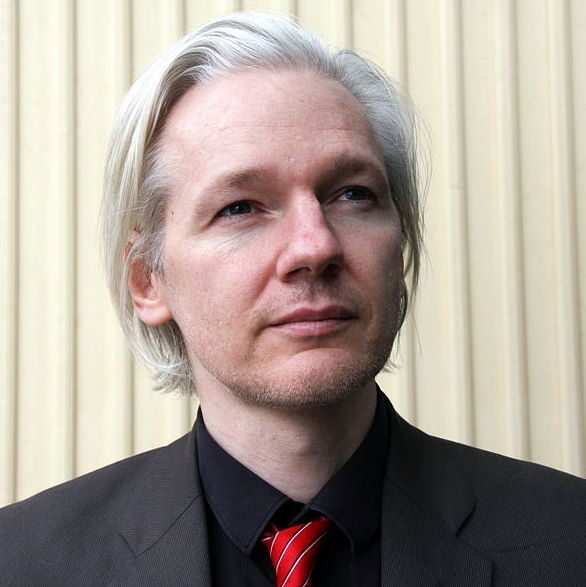
Benedict Cumberbatch (left) portrayed Julian Assange (right).
- Benedict Cumberbatch as Julian Assange
- Daniel Brühl as Daniel Domscheit-Berg
- Anthony Mackie as Sam Coulson
- David Thewlis as Nick Davies
- Moritz Bleibtreu as Marcus
- Alicia Vikander as Anke Domscheit-Berg
- Stanley Tucci as James Boswell
- Laura Linney as Sarah Shaw
- Carice van Houten as Birgitta Jónsdóttir
- Peter Capaldi as Alan Rusbridger
- Dan Stevens as Ian Katz
- Alexander Beyer as Marcel Rosenbach
- Alexander Siddig as Dr. Tarek Haliseh
- Philip Bretherton as Bill Keller
- Lydia Leonard as Alex Lang
- Hera Hilmar as WikiLeaks staffer
- Nigel Whitmey as General Thomason
- Peter Nzioki as Oscar Kamau Kingara
- Joseph Muriuki as John Paul Oulu

== Production ==
=== Development ===
It was reported in March 2011 that Steven Spielberg's DreamWorks Studios had acquired the rights of Domscheit-Berg's book Inside WikiLeaks: My Time with Julian Assange and the World's Most Dangerous Website, as well as WikiLeaks: Inside Julian Assange's War on Secrecy by British journalists David Leigh and Luke Harding. Spielberg was quick to clarify that he is not involved in any way in the adaptation even though his DreamWorks company would produce the film.

In July 2012, reports surfaced that Jeremy Renner was in talks of playing Julian Assange, and Bill Condon was in negotiations to direct. It was also announced that Josh Singer penned the screenplay. Later that year, Deadline Hollywood broke the news that Renner was out of the running and the studio was seeking Benedict Cumberbatch instead. Joel Kinnaman was also attached at some point, but reports were proven to be premature. The confirmation of Cumberbatch as the lead and Condon as the director also brought the news that James McAvoy was in talks to play Daniel Domscheit-Berg. McAvoy later dropped out because of scheduling conflicts and Daniel Brühl was eventually cast.

In December 2012, the film's title was reported as The Man Who Sold the World but with the official press release, it was confirmed that the film's title was actually The Fifth Estate.

=== Filming ===
Principal photography began on January 23, 2013, with Michael Sugar and Steve Golin of Anonymous Content serving as producers. During filming, Cumberbatch had to wear three different wigs, false teeth and blue contact lenses, in order to reflect Julian Assange's physical characteristics.

The film was partially shot in Belgium, as can be seen in the movie poster, which contains the Liège-Guillemins railway station.

=== Title sequence ===
The film's title sequence, which depicts the history of news communication, took over a year to create.

=== Music ===
The film's score was composed by Carter Burwell and its soundtrack was released by Lakeshore Records on October 8, 2013.

== Criticism by Assange and WikiLeaks ==
It may be decades before we understand the full impact of WikiLeaks and how it's revolutionized the spread of information. So this film won't claim any long view authority on its subject, or attempt any final judgment. We want to explore the complexities and challenges of transparency in the information age and, we hope, enliven and enrich the conversations WikiLeaks has already provoked.

— Director Bill Condon, on the film

On January 24, 2013, Assange said during a presentation of the Sam Adams Award for Integrity in Intelligence—held at Oxford University—that he had read a version of the screenplay of the film, describing it as a "serious propaganda attack on WikiLeaks and the integrity of its staff", as a "lie built upon a lie", and as "fanning the flames for war on Iran". The opening scene was inside a putative military complex in Iran and nuclear symbols could be seen. Birgitta Jónsdóttir told the WikiLeaks official Twitter account, "the Iran scene has been written out, plus the name has been changed. Come with constructive ideas how to improve it". Birgitta also tweeted that Assange does not possess the latest version of the script.

Julian Assange described the film as a "massive propaganda attack". WikiLeaks criticised both books on which the film was based as "inaccurate and libellous". WikiLeaks said that the film was "careful to avoid most criticism of US foreign policy actually revealed by WikiLeaks" and covered "almost none of the evidence WikiLeaks published ... of serious abuses within the US military and the State Department". It said the film contained fabrications which had the effect of obscuring the benefits of WikiLeaks' releases and demonising Assange.

Assange contacted Cumberatch via email during filming to ask him to withdraw from the film. Cumberbatch said of Assange, "No matter how you cut it, he's done us a massive service, to wake us up to the zombielike way we absorb our news."

Our view is that a $US40 million advertising budget promoting WikiLeaks around the world, and actors like Cumberbatch speaking about it, is a good thing for the popularisation of WikiLeaks.

— WikiLeaks founder Julian Assange, on the film

On September 21, 2013, a version of the script, allegedly the film's screenplay, was released by WikiLeaks, along with commentary labeling the film as "fiction masquerading as fact". Both Assange and WikiLeaks have stated that neither DreamWorks nor Disney approached them for any consultation on the film. Assange elaborated on the matter, "I don't think we are in a situation anymore where an organization like DreamWorks or Disney can succinctly decide that it is going to produce a movie about living people, and living political refugees, and people who are embroiled in a grand jury proceeding in the United States, and just smear, without the cost."

He (Assange) called me one day during the making of the DreamWorks movie, when I was in a supermarket in Camberwell. 'I've got an idea,' he said. 'They'll want you as a consultant on this film. Why don't you say yes to that, and split the fee with me?'

'Because I'm not interested in that,' I said, 'and if you want to oppose the film, why would you also want to make a profit from it?'

'Why not?' he said.

— Writer Andrew O'Hagan, recalling Assange's reaction on the film

In October 2013, WikiLeaks published a personal letter that Assange wrote to Cumberbatch in January of that year, in which he commended the actor's talent and good intentions, but requested him to reconsider his involvement with the film, which Assange labeled as "a project that vilifies and marginalises a living political refugee to the benefit of an entrenched, corrupt and dangerous state." WikiLeaks described Cumberbatch's reply to Assange as "courteous and considered". Cumberbatch also admitted his reservations with the early drafts of the film's script, believing that it portrayed Assange as an antagonistic person. In regard to his continued involvement with the film, Cumberbatch stated "I wanted to create a three dimensional portrait of a man far more maligned in the tabloid press than he is in our film to remind people that he is not just the weird, white haired Australian dude wanted in Sweden, hiding in an embassy behind Harrods. But a true force to be reckoned with, achieved the realization of the great ideal." In an interview with George Stephanopoulos' show This Week, Assange stated that "Cumberbatch tried to ameliorate the script but unfortunately with limited success... though I'm pleased he tried."

In February 2014, Andrew O'Hagan, the ghostwriter of Assange's autobiography by Canongate, recalled the activist's reaction to the film in a lecture for the London Review of Books. He stated that Assange wanted him to be a consultant on the film and even suggested that O'Hagan split his fee with Assange.

== Release ==
Walt Disney Studios Motion Pictures distributed The Fifth Estate globally through its Touchstone Pictures label, except for India and territories in Europe, the Middle East and Africa, where the film's rights were sold by Mister Smith Entertainment to independent distributors, including Entertainment One in the United Kingdom and Benelux. Reliance Entertainment (who co-produced and financed the film), released it in India.

The film opened the Toronto International Film Festival on September 5, 2013.

=== Home media ===
Touchstone Home Entertainment released the film on Blu-ray and DVD on January 7, 2014.

== Reception ==
=== Box office ===
The Fifth Estate grossed $3.3 million in North America and $5.3 million in other territories for a worldwide total of $8.6 million, against a budget of $28 million.

In its opening weekend, the film came in eighth place with $1.7 million, one of the lowest openings for a DreamWorks release and the worst 2013 debut for a wide release in the United States. The film was a box office bomb in the United States, though according to Disney distribution chief Dave Hollis, the film performed best in major North American cities.

=== Critical response ===
The Fifth Estate received mixed reviews from film critics, although Cumberbatch's performance as Assange received praise. On Rotten Tomatoes the film has an approval rating of 35%, based on 181 reviews, with an average score of 5.4/10. The website's critical consensus reads, "Heavy on detail and melodrama but missing the spark from its remarkable real-life inspiration, The Fifth Estate mostly serves as a middling showcase for Benedict Cumberbatch's remarkable talent." On Metacritic, the film has a weighted average score of 49 out of 100, based on 42 critics, indicating "mixed or average reviews". It received an average grade of "B" from market-research firm CinemaScore.

Variety wrote "that it primarily hobbles itself by trying to cram in more context-needy material than any single drama should have to bear." The Hollywood Reporter compared the film unfavorably to The Social Network, adding that "Though it will attract attention at the box office, it is unlikely to appeal broadly to moviegoers who, one suspects, have never been as worked up about WikiLeaks as journalists and governments are." Tim Robey of The Daily Telegraph reciprocated the comparison, elaborating that, "At times, this debt is so obvious that the movie's style feels second-hand: an overeager, slightly shop-worn bombardment of finger-on-the-pulse pop-out graphics, representing the giddy proliferation of voices in the misinformation age by simply filling the screen with text."

Alan Scherstuhl of The Village Voice criticized the film for hewing "so closely to template that it's easy to imagine that paperclip from Microsoft Word popping up on Condon's desktop one day to say, 'It looks like you're directing a techno-thriller. Would you like help?'"

Owen Gleiberman of Entertainment Weekly praised the film, describing it as "a vintage journalism thriller, a nihilistic newspaper drama for the dark digital age." Peter Bradshaw of The Guardian gave a positive review, noting that the film "sticks to the ancient movie tradition of depicting journalists as untamed, quasi-bohemian wild men, showing up late, gruff and unshaven in the office."

Mark Kermode's reaction was mixed, praising the film's cast and cinematography, but disliking the direction, writing that "The Fifth Estate feels strangely unfocused, uncertain of how to deal with its slippery enigma." Rolling Stone's Peter Travers enjoyed the dynamic between Cumberbatch and Brühl, but disliked the focus of the film's subplot.

Alan Rusbridger, who worked closely with Assange and is portrayed by Peter Capaldi in the film, describes Cumberbatch as "stunning as Assange. The voice and the slightly jerky, stiff, awkward demeanour are just right."

=== Accolades ===
Benedict Cumberbatch won the award as British Artist of the Year at the Britannia Awards for this film as well as for his work on 12 Years a Slave, August: Osage County, The Hobbit: The Desolation of Smaug, and Star Trek Into Darkness.

== See also ==
- We Steal Secrets: The Story of WikiLeaks — a documentary regarding the history of WikiLeaks
- Mediastan — a documentary about WikiLeaks which was publicly endorsed by the organization
- Underground: The Julian Assange Story — an Australian television film about his early life
