= Mafia state =

State system where government is tied with organized crime

In politics, a mafia state is a state system where the government is tied with organized crime to the degree when government officials, the police, and/or military became a part of the criminal enterprise. According to US diplomats, the expression "mafia state" was coined by Alexander Litvinenko.

== Particular applications of the concept ==
=== Mafia in Italy and Yakuza in Japan ===
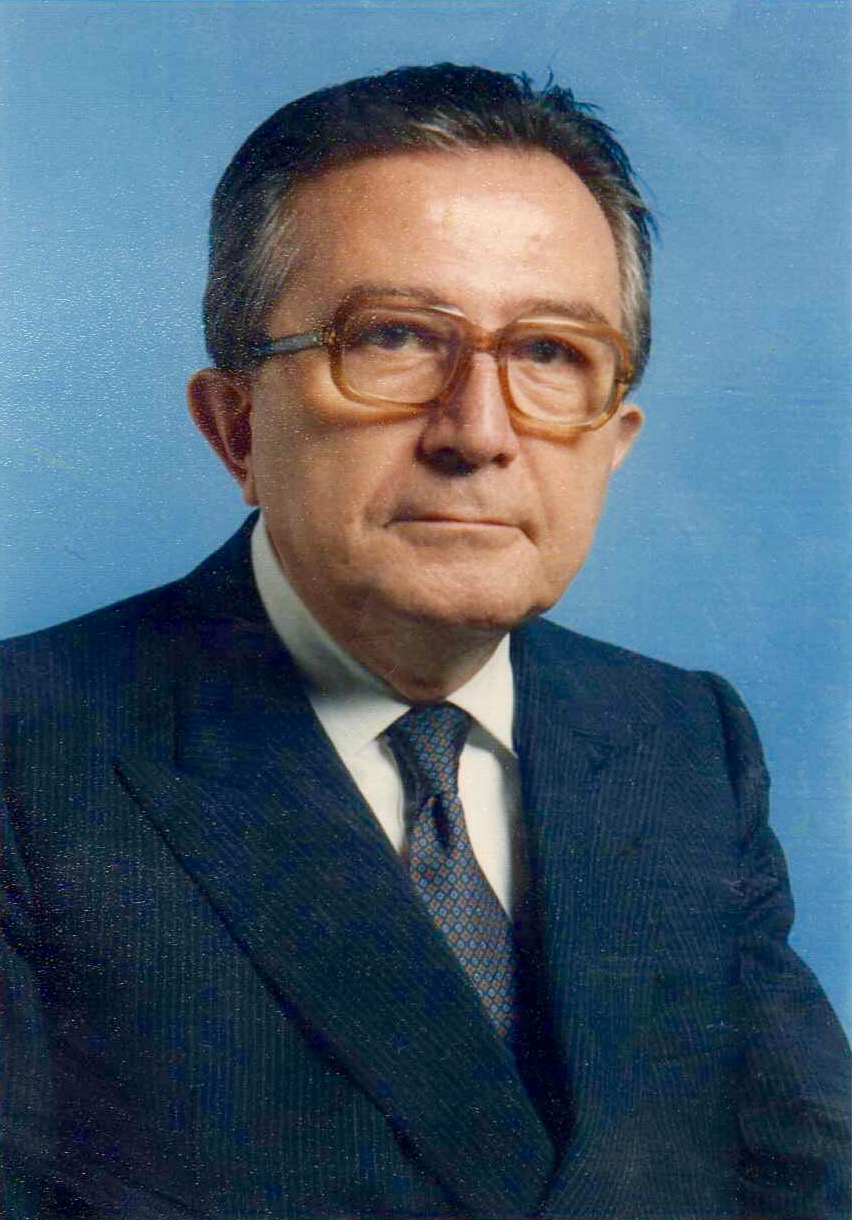
Giulio Andreotti, seven-time Prime Minister of Italy, was charged with having links to the Mafia.

In a critical review of Moisés Naím's essay in Foreign Affairs, Peter Andreas pointed to the long existence of the Italian mafia and Japanese Yakuza, writing that there were close relationships between those illicit organisations and respective governments. According to Andreas, these examples speak against incidences of mafia states as a historically new threat.

In Italy, three main mafia organisations originated in the 19th century: the Cosa Nostra originating from the region of Sicily, the Camorra originating from the region of Campania, and the 'Ndrangheta originating from the region of Calabria.

Former Prime Minister of Italy, Giulio Andreotti, had legal action against him, with a trial for mafia association on 27 March 1993 in the city of Palermo. The prosecution accused the former prime minister of "[making] available to the mafia association named Cosa Nostra for the defense of its interests and attainment of its criminal goals, the influence and power coming from his position as the leader of a political faction". Prosecutors said in return for electoral support of Salvo Lima and assassination of Andreotti's enemies, he had agreed to protect the Mafia, which had expected him to fix the Maxi Trial. Andreotti's defense was predicated on character attacks against the prosecution's key witnesses, who were themselves involved with the mafia. Andreotti was acquitted on 23 October 1999. However, together with the greater series of corruption cases of Mani pulite, Andreotti's trials marked the purging and renewal of Italy's political system.

The Camorra Casalesi clan rose in the 1980s, gaining control of large areas of the local economy "partly by manipulating politicians and intimidating judges". The clan was heavily involved in the Naples waste management crisis that dumped toxic waste around Campania in the 1990s and 2000s; the boss of the clan, Gaetano Vassallo, admitted to systematically working for 20 years to bribe local politicians and officials to gain their acquiescence to dumping toxic waste.

=== Countries described as mafia states ===
==== Former Yugoslavia ====
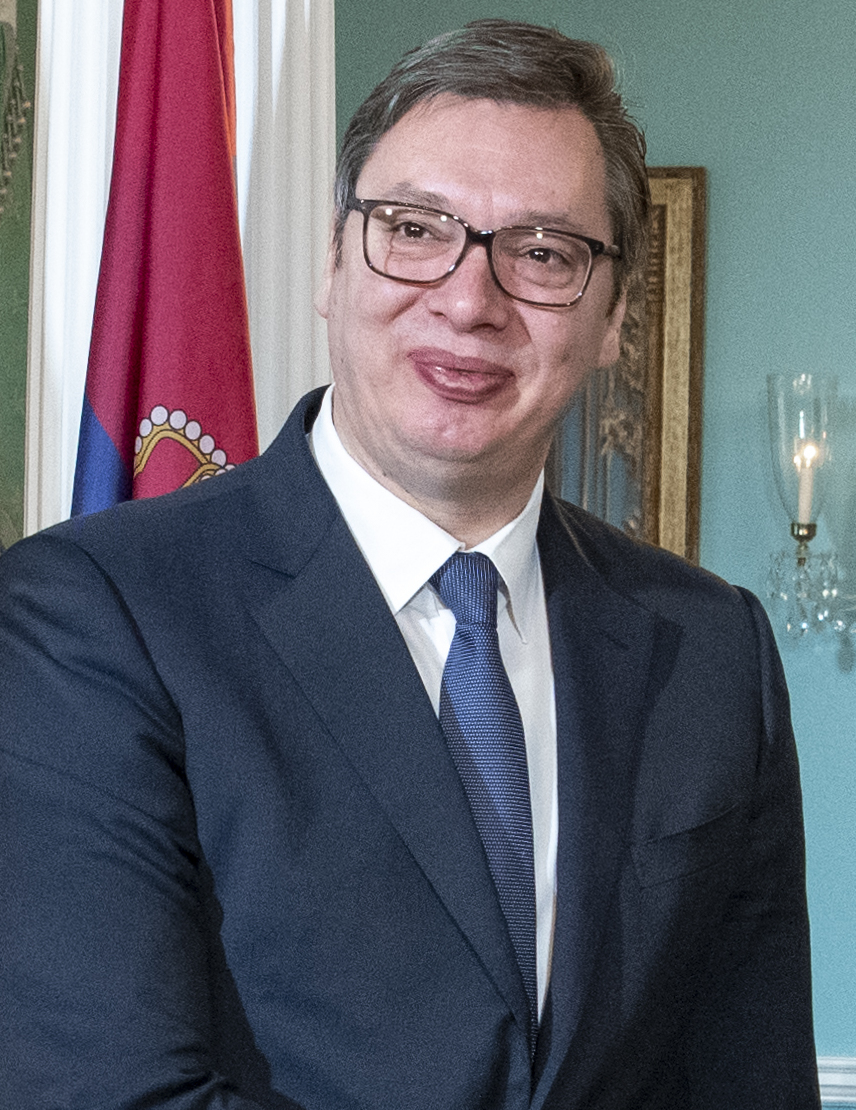
Former Serbian President Vučić.

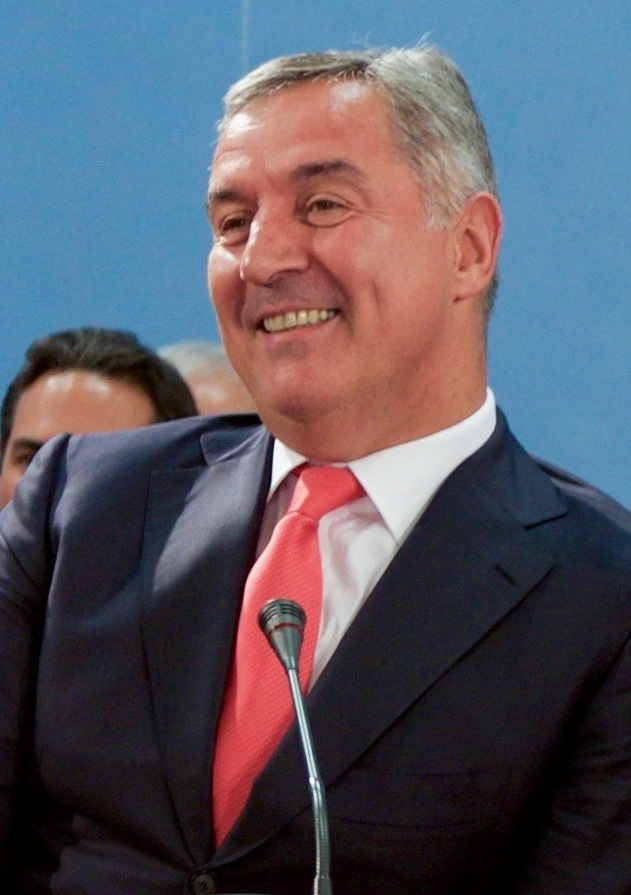
Montenegro's former president Milo Đukanović is often described as having strong links to Montenegrin mafia.

Serbia is often regarded as "captured state", with even sliding further into a state "wherein the line between ruling elites and criminal groups has grown completely blurred," to the point that it "fits the bill" of a mafia state.

Kosovo, a partially recognised break-away state from Serbia, was called a "mafia state" by Italian MEP Pino Arlacchi in 2011, and also by Moisés Naím in his 2012 essay "Mafia States" in Foreign Affairs.

Naím also labeled Montenegro as a "mafia state" in the same essay, describing it as a hub for cigarette smuggling.

==== Transnistria ====
Transnistria, an unrecognised break-away state from Moldova, has long been described by journalists, researchers, politicians and diplomats as a quasi-state whose economy is dependent on contraband and gunrunning, with some having directly referred to Transnistria as a mafia state.

For instance, in 2002, Moldova's president, Vladimir Voronin, called Transnistria a "residence of international mafia", "smuggling stronghold", and "outpost of Islamic combatants". Attempts of customs blockade followed the allegations. Reacting to the allegations, Russian state-run RTR aired an investigative program revealing that Transnistrian firms were conducting industrial-level manufacturing of small arms purposely for subsequent illegal trafficking via the Ukrainian port of Odesa. According to the program, the trade was controlled by and benefited from Transnistria's founder and then-ruler Igor Smirnov.

During the press conference on 30 November 2006, head of EUBAM Ferenc Banfi officially stated that organised smuggling of weapons in Transnistria did not exist. In 2013, Ukrainian Foreign Minister and acting chairman of the Organization for Security and Cooperation in Europe (OSCE) Leonid Kozhara gave an interview to El País, commenting on the situation in Transnistria and results of work of the EUBAM mission. According to Kozhara, there have been no cases of arms traffic found.

Some experts from Russia and Transnistria state that allegations of Transnistria being a "mafia state", "black hole of Europe", and "heaven for arms trafficking", etc. are a carefully planned defamation campaign paid by the Moldovan government and aimed at producing a negative image of Transnistria. Officials from the European Union and the OSCE say they have no evidence that the Tiraspol regime has ever trafficked arms or nuclear material. Much of the alarm is attributed to efforts by the Moldovan government to increase pressure on Transnistria.

==== Russia ====
The term has been used by slain Russian dissident Alexander Litvinenko and media to describe the political system in Russia under Vladimir Putin's rule. This characterization came to prominence following the United States diplomatic cables leak, which revealed that US diplomats viewed Russia as "a corrupt, autocratic kleptocracy centred on the leadership of Vladimir Putin, in which officials, oligarchs and organised crime are bound together to create a 'virtual mafia state.'" In his book titled Mafia State, journalist and author Luke Harding argues that Putin has "created a state peopled by ex-KGB and FSB officers, like himself, [who are] bent on making money above all." In the estimation of American diplomats, "the government [of Russia] effectively [is] the mafia." Russian-American journalist Masha Gessen has also described Russia as a "mafia state".

According to the New Statesman, "the term had entered the lexicon of expert discussion" several years before the cables leak, "and not as a frivolous metaphor. Those most familiar with the country had come to see it as a kleptocracy with Vladimir Putin in the role of capo di tutti capi, dividing the spoils and preventing turf wars between rival clans of an essentially criminal elite." In 2008, Stephen Blank noted that Russia under Putin is "a state that European officials privately call a Mafia state" that "naturally gravitates toward Mafia-like behavior."

Nikolay Petrov, an analyst at the Carnegie Moscow Centre, said "it's pretty hard to damage the Russian image in the world because it's already not very good".

The term pakhanate, created from the underworld slang, has also been used to describe Russia's political system.

==== Hungary ====
A 2001 article conducted an analysis of actions undertaken by Fidesz, the then newly established governing party in Hungary, which it deemed to be aimed at dismantling the institutional framework of the rule of law. This approach introduced novel concepts such as the 'organized over-world', the 'state employing mafia methods', and the 'adopted political family'. While initially met with skepticism by many, who regarded these concepts as metaphors rather than integral elements of a coherent framework, a significant shift occurred a decade later. In the 2010 elections, Fidesz secured a commanding two-thirds majority in Parliament.

Subsequently, both the party and the state itself came under the sway of a single individual, who adeptly applied techniques honed within the party to exert control over society at large. In a departure from the trajectory observed in other post-communist systems, where segments of the party and secret service assumed control over both political power and wealth, Fidesz, as a relative newcomer, aggressively reshaped the elite landscape to assert dominance.

The modus operandi of the post-communist mafia state revolves around concentrating power and wealth within the confines of the clan. However, unlike traditional mafia structures reliant on direct coercion, the mafia state achieves its objectives through ostensibly legitimate means such as parliamentary legislation, legal prosecution, tax enforcement, police action, and utilization of secret services.

According to journalist Masha Gessen, in 2016, sociologist Bálint Magyar popularized the term "mafia state" to describe the administration of Viktor Orbán in Hungary. Magyar argued that Orbán's method of taking power in Hungary, removing rivals and politicizing institutions for personal power, created a kind of regime known as a "mafia state". Magyar said that other states besides Hungary included Azerbaijan, Russia, and Kazakhstan as of 2016.

==== Mexico ====
The scholar of Law and Economics Edgardo Buscaglia describes the political system of Mexico as a "Mafiacracy". Buscaglia characterises the condition between the state, the economy and organized crime in Mexico as a mutual interweaving, Mexico has also been labeled as a Narco-state (a political and economic term applied to countries where all legitimate institutions become penetrated by the power and wealth of the illegal drug trade).

==== Other ====
Venezuela under President Hugo Chávez has also been evaluated as creating the conditions for President Nicolás Maduro to consolidate a "mafia state", according to political scientists in Policy Studies in 2021. Moisés Naím, Venezuelan writer and the author of Illicit: How Smugglers, Traffickers, and Copycats Are Hijacking the Global Economy, wrote in an article for the American magazine Foreign Policy in 2012: "In mafia states such as Bulgaria, Guinea-Bissau, Montenegro, Myanmar, Ukraine, and Venezuela, the national interest and the interests of organised crime are now inextricably intertwined."

During the 1990s, Aruba, an overseas constituent country of the Kingdom of the Netherlands, was alleged to be a mafia state under then Prime Minister Henny Eman. The Sicilian Cuntrera-Caruana Mafia clan was said to "own" over 60% of the island through investments in hotels, casinos, and donations towards Eman's election campaign. These claims later turned out to be exaggerated, however.

In 2010, Libyan leader Muammar Gaddafi had labelled Switzerland as a mafia state, stating that "Switzerland is behaving like a criminal organisation and it is involved in money laundering, assassinations and terrorism."

Jonathan Benton, the former head of a United Kingdom anti-corruption agency, described Malta as a "mafia state" where money laundering transactions of hundreds of millions of euros are made every year without any problem. He made this statement while speaking on BBC radio following the murder of investigative journalist Daphne Caruana Galizia.

Currently, Indonesia has been described by media as mafia state due to the rise of preman influences in the country. According to Ian Douglas Wilson, premanism could not exist without being tolerated by the state. In 2025, automakers BYD and VinFast has reported that their factory construction workers were harassed by preman demanding protection money. There are many widespread accusations that the government has been protecting two rivalling gangs, GRIB Jaya and Pancasila Youth for political and economic interests.

Though he does not explicitly use the term 'mafia state', in his 2016 book "Trinidad and Tobago: The Rise of a Criminal State", political scientist Jason Henry sets out an argument that Trinidad and Tobago can be considered a criminal state. From Henry's account, it is clear that the concepts of a mafia/criminal state are very closely aligned.

== Countries formerly described as mafia states ==
=== Syria ===
For more than half a century, Syria had been under the tight grip of the Assad dynasty, and its ruling system has been described as a mafia state. Due to the Syrian economy being dominated by business people tied to Assad family, control of various services like electricity by loyalist warlords, etc. more than 90% of Syrians live in poverty. The regime also profits from a multi-billion dollar captagon industry, made of a network consisting of over 35 manufacturing centres and factories, known as the "Syndicate" (Niqabeh). Assad's wife Asma stripped the assets of pro-Assad billionaire Rami Makhlouf and subsequently took control of all foreign charities and UN aid money; enabling the Assads to own revenue money directly. The fall of Rami Makhlouf led to widespread characterisations of Assad acting as a crime boss presiding over "a crime syndicate simply designed to enrich himself and his family", deploying violence to advance the interests of his mafia. Businessman Ribal al-Assad, a cousin of Bashar al-Assad who lives in exile outlines the situation:

"When it's all boiled down, the family is still in charge.. They are very sensitive to internal issues and they know how to manage them. They have a saying: "You may not have to listen to your cousins, but you do need to listen to their mothers."

Various academics compare Assad's reign to tribal rule, with Assad as the tribal chieftain glorified by the system and extolled as its saviour. Syrian-French Professor of Sociology Burhan Ghalioun asserts that Bashar al-Assad doesn't see Syrians as an independent people, but rather as guests in his family property. Hence, Assad's dictatorship is akin to the colonial project of an invading empire, according to Ghalioun. Syrian historian Rana Kabbani designates Assad's dynastic rule as "internal colonialism" owing to the deep disconnect of the regime's post-colonial ruling classes from its native population and their blatant disregard for Syrian wealth and lives. Describing how neo-Ba'athist ideologues and Assadist security apparatus constructed a totalitarian state built around cult of personality to the Assad dynasty, Rana Kabbani writes:

"When Bashar al-Assad's father, Hafez, came to power through yet another violent army squabble leading to his coup of 1970, an alarming cult of the leader was systematically formed around him, modelled on Ceausescu. The Romanian dictator was Assad's political ally, strategic adviser in matters of popular repression, and close personal and family friend...In the government school I attended in Damascus between 1971 and 1974, a process of wholesale brainwashing had begun. It was designed to create a population with no political personality or affiliation – other than to the head of what would become, in my children's generation, a vindictive family mafia, monopolising business and power with the crudest of propaganda machines and the most lethal of security services."

In December of 2024, the Assad regime fell.

== See also ==
- Failed state
- Kleptocracy
- Narco-state
- North Korea's illicit activities
- Police state
- Rogue state
- Terrorist state
- Verbrecherstaat
