= The Snowden Files =

2014 book by Luke Harding

The Snowden Files: The Inside Story of the World's Most Wanted Man
- First edition
- Authors: Luke Harding
- Language: English
- Subject: Espionage
- Genre: non-fiction
- Publisher: Vintage Books
- Publication date: 2014
- ISBN: 9780804173520
- OCLC: 870337274

The Snowden Files: The Inside Story of the World's Most Wanted Man is a 2014 book by Luke Harding, published by Vintage Books.

Greg Miller of The Washington Post described the book as the first single-book account of Edward Snowden's 2013 leaking of National Security Agency (NSA) documents. However, Miller commented that the "British perspective" of the book "overlooks some significant U.S. developments and underplays important work done by other journalists, including Barton Gellman of The Washington Post."

== Reception ==
Greg Miller concluded that "Harding has delivered a clearly written and captivating account of the Snowden leaks and their aftermath, succeeding beyond his most basic ambition, which was to arrive in bookstores first."

The book received positive reviews from The Guardian and the London Review of Books, which called it "a super-readable, thrillerish account of the events surrounding the reporting of the documents". Michiko Kakutani in The New York Times wrote that the book "reads like a le Carré novel crossed with something by Kafka."

Conversely, The Daily Telegraph's David Blair wrote: "Harding's story crackles with verve, but complexity and nuance are banished. In particular, the real dilemmas of intelligence work are ignored."

The Snowden Files was initially criticised by Snowden associate, journalist Glenn Greenwald, when he had only read extracts from Harding's book. Later, after reading the whole book, he conceded that it did not criticise Snowden. On February 14, 2014 Greenwald told the Financial Times: "They are purporting to tell the inside story of Edward Snowden but it is written by someone who has never met or even spoken to Edward Snowden. Luke came here and talked to me for half a day without [my] realising that he was trying to get me to write his book for him. I cut the interview off when I realised what he was up to." The Financial Times has since amended the article stating: "Harding insists that when he spoke to Greenwald in Rio, he made it very clear he was doing research for his book on Snowden."

WikiLeaks founder and Snowden backer Julian Assange—subject of the 2011 book WikiLeaks: Inside Julian Assange's War on Secrecy, coauthored by Luke Harding and David Leigh, that Assange condemned—harshly criticized both The Snowden Files and its author, calling the book "a walloping fraud, written by frauds to be praised by frauds". Assange stated, "the most disappointing thing of all about The Snowden Files is that it is exploitative. It should not have existed at all. We all understand the pressures facing print journalism and the need to diversify revenue in order to cross-subsidize investigative journalism. But investigative journalism involves being able to develop relationships of trust with your sources."

== Movie ==
The Snowden Files, along with the fictionalized Time of the Octopus by Snowden's Russian lawyer Anatoly Kucherena, forms the basis of the Oliver Stone film Snowden (2016).
