= Afghan War documents leak =

2010 leak published by WikiLeaks

The Afghan War documents leak, also called the Afghan War Diary, is a collection of internal U.S. military logs of the war in Afghanistan published by WikiLeaks on 25 July 2010. The logs consist of over 91,000 Afghan war documents covering the period between January 2004 and December 2009. Most of the documents are classified secret. As of 28 July 2010, only 75,000 have been released to the public, a move WikiLeaks said was "part of a harm minimization process demanded by [the] source". Prior to releasing the initial 75,000 documents, WikiLeaks made the logs available to The Guardian, The New York Times and Der Spiegel in its German and English online edition, which published reports in line with an agreement made earlier the same day, 25 July 2010.

The leak, one of the largest in U.S. military history, revealed information on the deaths of civilians, increased Taliban attacks, and involvement by Pakistan and Iran in the insurgency. WikiLeaks did not review all of the records before release because of the volume of material. A WikiLeaks spokesman said they "just can't imagine that someone could go through 76,000 documents." WikiLeaks says it does not know the source of the leaked data. The three outlets which had received the documents in advance, The New York Times, The Guardian, and Der Spiegel, compared them with independent reports and found them to be authentic.

The New York Times described the leak as "a six-year archive of classified military documents [that] offers an unvarnished and grim picture of the Afghan war". The Guardian called the material "one of the biggest leaks in U.S. military history ... a devastating portrait of the failing war in Afghanistan, revealing how coalition forces have killed hundreds of civilians in unreported incidents, Taliban attacks have soared and NATO commanders fear neighbouring Pakistan and Iran are fuelling the insurgency". Der Spiegel wrote that "the editors in chief of Spiegel, The New York Times and The Guardian were 'unanimous in their belief that there is a justified public interest in the material'."

Some time after the first dissemination by WikiLeaks, the U.S. Justice Department considered using the Espionage Act of 1917 to prevent WikiLeaks from posting the remaining 15,000 secret war documents it claimed to possess.

== Background ==
In June 2010, The Guardian journalist Nick Davies and WikiLeaks founder Julian Assange established that the U.S. Army had built a huge database with six years of sensitive military intelligence material. WikiLeaks wanted to release the material immediately, but Davies convinced him to let The Guardian examine it first. In an interview with the UK's Channel 4, Assange said that "we have a stated commitment... to get censored material out and never to take it down". He contrasted the group with other media outlets by saying that "other journalists try to verify sources. We don't do that, we verify documents." He denied that the group has an inherent bias against the Afghanistan war, saying that "We don't have a view about whether the war should continue or stop – we do have a view that it should be prosecuted as humanely as possible." However, he also said that he believed the leaked information would cause global public opinion to view the war negatively.

In August 2010, Assange announced that they had received word the Pentagon wanted to discuss harm minimisation and sanitizing the Afghan war documents, and that "contact has been established." Geoff Morrell, press secretary for the Pentagon, alleged WikiLeaks "misrepresented both the level of engagement we have had as well as our position on this matter." Bryan Whitman, spokesman for the Pentagon, denied they were willing to collaborate with the group and said they'd scheduled a call with a WikiLeaks lawyer, Timothy Matusheski, who missed the call. Matusheski denied making an appointment but said he had missed a call from them. Matusheski said that when he'd previously spoken with the US government, he mentioned that Assange had told him about a network where the government could access all of the documents and make comments and suggest redactions. Jeh Charles Johnson, general counsel for the Pentagon, sent Matusheski a letter about the missed call and stated the US government's position was that "WikiLeaks is holding the property of the U.S. Government, including classified documents and sensitive national security information that has not been authorized for release. Further, it is the view of the Department of Defense that WikiLeaks obtained this material in circumstances that constitute a violation of United States law, and that as long as WikiLeaks holds this material, the violation of the law is ongoing." WikiLeaks only reviewed about 2,000 documents in detail and used a tagging and keyword system. Assange said that a court might decide some things were crimes, but added that "army personnel are basically engineers, who build roads and fire guns. They are frank and direct, and the top people mostly won't lie to you unless they're repeating a lie that someone else told them".

An Obama administration statement disputed the self-reported status of WikiLeaks, stating that it "is not an objective news outlet but rather an organization that opposes U.S. policy in Afghanistan". Will Heaven of The Daily Telegraph said that WikiLeaks had not been politically neutral when it fed information to left-leaning newspapers (The Guardian, The New York Times, and Der Spiegel) instead of releasing the data openly. He said that the selectivity of the leak "contravene[d] its own mission statement – that crowdsourcing and open data are paramount". The Toronto Sun has referred to Assange's statements "This material shines light on the everyday brutality and squalor of war" and "The archive will change public opinion and it will change the opinion of people in positions of political and diplomatic influence" as evidence that he has an anti-war mission.

According to Daniel Domscheit-Berg, four days before the release, Assange hadn't told the WikiLeaks staff members preparing it that he had agreed to redact all the names. Since WikiLeaks couldn't redact the files in time, its media partners agreed to withholding 14,000 documents that contained most of the names.

== Issues raised ==
=== Allegations of foreign support for the Taliban ===
==== Pakistan ====
According to Der Spiegel, "the documents clearly show that the Pakistani intelligence agency Inter-Services Intelligence (usually known as the ISI) is the most important accomplice the Taliban has outside of Afghanistan". The New York Times was especially alarmed by the level of collusion with the Taliban, having concluded that Pakistan "allows representatives of its spy service to meet directly with the Taliban in secret strategy sessions to organize networks of militant groups that fight against American soldiers in Afghanistan, and even hatch plots to assassinate Afghan leaders". The Guardian, however, did not think there was "a convincing smoking gun" for complicity between Pakistan intelligence services and the Taliban.

In particular, the leaks discuss an alleged incident in which former ISI spy chief Hamid Gul met with Afghan insurgents in January 2009, occurring right after alleged Pakistani al-Qaeda figure Osama al-Kini's death by a CIA drone attack. "The meeting attendees were saddened by the news of Zamarai's death and discussed plans to complete Zamarai's last mission by facilitating the movement of a suicide vehicle-borne improvised explosive device from Pakistan to Afghanistan through the Khan Pass", leaked reports said. The New York Times stated that it could not confirm whether or not the attack ever took place.

The initial web article in The New York Times on the subject, appearing 25 July was written by Mark Mazzetti, Jane Perlez, Eric Schmitt, and Andrew Lehren, and titled "Pakistan Spy Service Aids Insurgents, Reports Assert". It was the lead article in 26 July print edition of the Times. The article provided a wide range of excerpts from the paper, at some points focusing on coalition successes, and at other times excerpting sections that highlighted coalition failures. Many of the excerpts illustrated American frustration with local involvement, quoting the sources, noting that "glimpses of what appear to be Pakistani skullduggery contrast sharply with the frequently rosy public pronouncements of Pakistan as an ally by American officials".

The Guardian had a very different take. Its Sunday, 25 July 2010 article by Declan Walsh states:

But for all their eye-popping details, the intelligence files, which are mostly collated by junior officers relying on informants and Afghan officials, fail to provide a convincing smoking gun for ISI complicity. Most of the reports are vague, filled with incongruent detail, or crudely fabricated. The same characters – famous Taliban commanders, well-known ISI officials – and scenarios repeatedly pop up. And few of the events predicted in the reports subsequently occurred. A retired senior American officer said ground-level reports were considered to be a mixture of "rumours, bullshit and second-hand information" and were weeded out as they passed up the chain of command.

The Obama administration, in response to the leaks, re-expressed their long-held doubts about links between Pakistan intelligence agents and Afghan insurgents. An anonymous official said to Al Arabiya, "I don't think anyone who follows this issue will find it surprising that there are concerns about ISI and safe havens in Pakistan".

==== Iran ====
Evidence that Iran provided extensive assistance to the Taliban was also revealed. Coming from sources such as Afghan spies and paid informants, Iranian involvement in Afghanistan steadily widened from 2004 to today and constituted armaments, money, and physical deployment of anti-NATO militants. The government of Iran denied supporting the militants.

==== North Korea ====
The documents, wrote journalist Jeff Stein of The Washington Post, stated that Hezb-e-Islami party leader Gulbuddin Hekmatyar and Amin al-Haq, a financial advisor to Osama bin Laden, both flew to North Korea on 19 November 2005, and purchased remote-controlled rockets to be used against American and coalition aircraft. Stein cautioned that he found no corroborating reports of North Korean involvement in Taliban armaments dealing.

=== Civilian casualties ===
Hundreds of civilians have been wounded or killed by coalition forces in several instances that were not previously revealed. The press listed several examples of such previously unreported incidents of civilian injuries and deaths. David Leigh of The Guardian wrote:

They range from the shootings of individual innocents to the often massive loss of life from air strikes, which eventually led President Hamid Karzai to protest publicly that the US was treating Afghan lives as "cheap". The logs refer to sums paid of 100,000 Afghani per corpse, equivalent to about £1,500.

In one incident, a U.S. patrol fired 43 rounds at a bus, wounding 13 and killing two of its passengers. The bus was approaching a stopped convoy in foul weather, swerving in and out of the median and did not stop in response to warning shots and flashbangs. After more concentrated fire, the bus crashed into the rear of one of the convoy vehicles. Most of the wounded were taken in for medical treatment.

On 4 March 2007, in the Shinwar shooting, U.S. Marines opened fire on civilians after witnessing a suicide bombing and supposedly coming under small arms fire. The Guardian reported their actions:

The marines made a frenzied escape [from the scene of the bombing], opening fire with automatic weapons as they tore down a six-mile stretch of highway, hitting almost anyone in their way – teenage girls in the fields, motorists in their cars, old men as they walked along the road. Nineteen unarmed civilians were killed and 50 wounded.

The military report of the incident (written by the same soldiers involved in it) later failed to make any reference to the deaths and injuries and none of the soldiers involved were charged or disciplined.

On 21 March 2007, CIA paramilitaries fired on and lightly wounded a civilian man who was running from them. The man, Shum Khan, was deaf and mute and did not hear their warnings.

In 2007, documents detail how U.S. special forces dropped six 2,000 lb bombs on a compound where they believed a "high-value individual" was hiding, after "ensuring there were no innocent Afghans in the surrounding area". A senior U.S. commander reported that 150 Taliban had been killed. Locals, however, reported that up to 300 civilians had died.

On 16 August 2007, Polish troops mortared the village of Nangar Khel, killing five people – including a woman and her baby – in what The Guardian described as an apparent revenge attack shortly after experiencing an IED explosion.

According to The Guardian, the logs also detail "how the Taliban have caused growing carnage with a massive escalation of their roadside bombing campaign, which has killed more than 2,000 civilians to date".

=== Friendly-fire casualties ===
A significant number of documents describe unreported or previously misleading friendly fire incidents between Afghan police and army forces, coalition forces, and the U.S. military.

A document dated 3 September 2006 suggests that four Canadian soldiers died in the Panjwaye District of Afghanistan during Operation Medusa, when an American jet dropped a bomb on a building they occupied during the second day of the operation. Seven other Canadian soldiers and one civilian were also reported wounded in the attack. At the time, the Canadian military reported that the deaths and injuries were caused by a firefight with the Taliban, which it still insists. Michel Drapeau, a former colonel with the Canadian Forces, commented that the document is disturbing, due to it differing from the military's report at the time of the soldiers' deaths, which could make the document incorrect. The Canadian military insists it had not been misleading facts about deaths of Canadian soldiers. Former Chief of the Defence Staff Rick Hillier also rejects the document and maintains the deaths were due to enemy fire, as do some of the deceased soldiers' families.

A document from 11 June 2007 details an incident where Task Force 373 engaged in a firefight with what were believed to be insurgents. An airstrike was called in, which killed seven Afghan police officers, and injured four others. Nangarhar Province governor Gul Agha Sherzai had labelled the incident a misunderstanding.

Less than 48 hours after the documents were leaked, the UK's Ministry of Defence released a statement announcing a new friendly fire death in Afghanistan.

The Ministry of Defence must confirm that the death of this soldier is being investigated as a suspected friendly fire incident.

The Ministry had previously announced an investigation into a friendly fire incident in 2009 in Helmand province.

=== Role of al-Qaeda ===
The war logs made clear that suicide bombing, generally carried out by non-Afghan foreign fighters, was increasing and claimed they were nurtured by al-Qaeda and Osama bin Laden, whose influence was pervasive and possibly growing. A report generated in September 2004 stated that terrorists had been assigned by bin Laden to conduct a suicidal attack against the Afghan president Hamid Karzai during a press conference or meeting. A September 2008 report spoke of coordinated, multinational al-Qaeda attack planning. More suicide bombings allegedly were planned with al-Qaeda's Afghan allies, such as the Hezb-e-Islami Gulbuddin militia led by the notorious warlord Gulbuddin Hekmatyar. Numerous reports linked bin Laden and al-Qaeda to insurgent activities. In one report, al-Qaeda was claimed to be involved in a plan to manufacture chemical weapons payloads for rocket-propelled grenades.

=== Role of special ops greater than previously revealed ===
Government accounts of coalition activity were, according to The Guardian, sometimes "misleading". The British paper cited as an example a press statement that concealed the fact that the real reason for a coalition presence in a particular area was because a group known as Task Force 373 was on a mission to kill or capture Abu Laith al-Libi. The New York Times reported that the United States had given Afghans credit for missions actually carried out by Special Operations commandos. The New York Times said "over all, the documents do not contradict official accounts of the war. But in some cases the documents show that the American military made misleading public statements".

The records log 144 incidents regarding Task Force 373 and involving Afghan civilian casualties, including 195 deaths.

=== Taliban use of heat-seeking missiles ===
The New York Times reported that the documents reveal the Taliban have used heat-seeking missiles to down coalition aircraft. The U.S. military had not previously acknowledged that the Taliban possessed these weapons.

=== Informants named ===
Some, including Barack Obama and Hamid Karzai, raised concerns that the detailed logs had exposed the names of Afghan informants, thereby endangering their lives. Partially in response to this criticism, Julian Assange claimed that WikiLeaks had sought the help of the White House, via The New York Times, in redacting the names of 'innocent' people but that this request had been denied. However, The New York Times reporter, Eric Schmitt, who was acting as an intermediary between WikiLeaks and the White House, told the Associated Press that, "I certainly didn't consider this a serious and realistic offer to the White House to vet any of the documents before they were to be posted, and I think it's ridiculous that Assange is portraying it that way now." WikiLeaks spokesperson, Daniel Schmitt, told The Daily Beast that they had sought the help of the Department of Defense in reviewing a further 15,000 documents for redactions before releasing them but Marine Colonel David Lapan, a senior spokesperson for the Department of Defense, said they had not been contacted by WikiLeaks. Julian Assange later told an Associated Press reporter in Sweden that WikiLeaks had contacted the Department of Defense's chief legal counsel, via its lawyers—a claim that was denied by Bryan Whitman, a spokesman for Defense Secretary, Robert Gates. However, a letter, written by General Counsel of the Department of Defense, Jeh Charles Johnson, in reply to WikiLeaks' attorney, Timothy Matusheski, was later released (either by the Department of Defense or WikiLeaks), in which Johnson identified the names of Afghan informants as 'sensitive items' but, in keeping with Bryan Whitman's later public statement, stated that:

the Department of Defense will not negotiate some "minimized" or "sanitized" version of a release by WikiLeaks of additional U.S. Government classified documents. The Department demands that nothing further be released by WikiLeaks, that all of the U.S. Government classified documents that WikiLeaks has obtained be returned immediately, and that WikiLeaks remove and destroy all of these records from its databases.

— Jeh Charles Johnson,

Asked by The Daily Beast why WikiLeaks did not review all of the documents and make redactions where necessary before their release, Daniel Schmitt replied that the volume of documents made it impossible.

Speaking to Channel 4 News, official spokesman for the Taliban, Zabihullah Mujahid, said that the Taliban would study the released documents in order to discover and punish informants.

We knew about the spies and people who collaborate with U.S. forces. We will investigate through our own secret service whether the people mentioned are really spies working for the U.S. If they are U.S. spies, then we know how to punish them.

— Zabihullah Mujahid,

When Assange was questioned about this statement by Amy Goodman in a Democracy Now! interview, he responded,

I reviewed the statement of someone that a London paper claimed to be speaking for some part of the Taliban. Remember, the Taliban is actually not a homogenous group. And the statement, as far as such things go, was fairly reasonable, which is that they would not trust these documents; they would use their own intelligence organization's investigations to understand whether those people were defectors or collaborators, and if so, after their investigations, then they would receive appropriate punishment. Now, of course, that is — you know, that image is disturbing, but that is what happens in war, that spies or traitors are investigated.

— Julian Assange,

Former WikiLeaks volunteer, Smári McCarthy, told The Independent, 'there were serious disagreements over the decision not to redact the names of Afghan civilians'. The Guardian journalist, David Leigh, claimed that Julian Assange initially refused to redact the names of informants. In his book, co-authored with Luke Harding, WikiLeaks: Inside Julian Assange's War on Secrecy, Leigh claimed Assange to have said in relation to whether the names should be redacted, "Well, they're informants. So, if they get killed, they've got it coming to them. They deserve it." In response to the book's publication, WikiLeaks posted on Twitter: "The Guardian book serialization contains malicious libels. We will be taking action." When Douglas Murray relayed these comments in a debate, Assange interjected "We are in the process of suing The Guardian in relation to that comment." The Guardian claimed the following day that they had 'not received any notification of such action from WikiLeaks or its lawyers', two months after the publication of the book.

=== Psychological warfare ===
Evidence within the documents suggest that the U.S. military has been paying Afghan radio and print media to run favorable stories. One document refers to supplying pre-made content to a radio station, describing that content as psychological operations/psychological warfare (PSYOP) material.

=== Insurgent attacks against civilians ===
The leaked documents describe many purported incidents of Taliban and other Afghan insurgent forces attacking civilians. Those forces would also, according to leaked reports, post "Night Letters" on civilian buildings such as mosques foretelling death for the inhabitants. In one leak from April 2007, Under Secretary of State for Public Diplomacy and Public Affairs Karen Hughes requests to verify a video of a 12-year-old child soldier forced to kill a Pakistani hostage. Thomas Joscelyn, a senior fellow at the think tank Foundation for Defense of Democracies, remarked that "the documents demonstrate just how pervasive the Taliban's brutality is in this fight".

=== Child prostitution ===
The documents revealed that contractors for the U.S. Department of Defense had hired local male child prostitutes.

== Responses ==
=== Media ===
==== WikiLeaks ====
Julian Assange said "it is the most comprehensive history of a war ever to be published, during the course of the war". He compared the release of the war logs with the release of the Pentagon Papers in the 1970s. In an interview with Der Spiegel, Assange said that he believed the release would "change public opinion", and said that "we understand why it is important to protect certain U.S. and ISAF sources". He added that "the most dangerous men are those who are in charge of war. And they need to be stopped." Assange also claimed that the files "suggest thousands of war crimes".

==== Los Angeles Times ====
An editorial in the Los Angeles Times stated that comparisons to the Pentagon Papers was an exaggeration as the documents lacked the policy implications of the papers, but that "no democracy can or should fight a war without the consent of its people, and that consent is only meaningful if it is predicated on real information". The Los Angeles Times did seem to indicate the documents have parallels with the Pentagon Papers in being published during a subsequent administration "the documents offer insight primarily into the war-fighting of the recently departed George W. Bush administration; the Pentagon Papers ended with the Johnson administration and were not published until Richard Nixon was president."

==== The Washington Post ====
An editorial in The Washington Post stated "they hardly provide a secret history of the war or disclose previously unknown malfeasance" and that "tends to fill out and confirm the narrative of Afghanistan between 2004 and 2009 that most Americans are already familiar with". The Post commented that it hardly merited the media hype and was not comparable to the Pentagon Papers or the MfS files. The editorial argued that WikiLeaks' founder revealed his organization's antiwar agenda by making the claim it contained evidence for prosecuting war crimes.

==== Foreign Policy ====
Blake Hounshell wrote in his blog on Foreign Policy that, after reading "selected documents", he believed that there is less new information in the documents than The New York Times, The Guardian, and Der Spiegel were reporting. Hounshell indicated how careful both The Guardian and The New York Times were to note "the raw reports in the Wikileaks archive often seem poorly sourced and present implausible information". Commenting on the significance of the documents:

I'd say that so far the documents confirm what we already know about the war: It's going badly; Pakistan is not the world's greatest ally and is probably playing a double game; coalition forces have been responsible for far too many civilian casualties; and the United States doesn't have very reliable intelligence in Afghanistan.

==== Other organisations ====
The release resulted in some criticism by some media organisations, and questions about WikiLeaks' tactics. Mother Jones wrote that "there's not much there" and "most of this information is tactical nuts and bolts, devoid of context, and largely useless". The Columbia Journalism Review was very critical and wrote "there will be serious, and deadly, consequences from WikiLeaks's War Diary archive".

==== News organisations given advanced access to the documents ====
===== The New York Times =====
The New York Times described the war logs as "a six-year archive of classified military documents [that] offers an unvarnished and grim picture of the Afghan war".

On the decision to publish, they stated:

Deciding whether to publish secret information is always difficult, and after weighing the risks and public interest, we sometimes chose not to publish. But there are times when the information is of significant public interest, and this is one of those times. The documents illuminate the extraordinary difficulty of what the United States and its allies have undertaken in a way that other accounts have not. Most of the incident reports are marked "secret", a relatively low level of classification. The Times has taken care not to publish information that would harm national security interests. The Times and the other news organizations agreed at the outset that we would not disclose – either in our articles or any of our online supplementary material – anything that was likely to put lives at risk or jeopardize military or antiterrorist operations. We have, for example, withheld any names of operatives in the field and informants cited in the reports.

===== The Guardian =====
The Guardian called the material "one of the biggest leaks in U.S. military history...a devastating portrait of the failing war in Afghanistan, revealing how coalition forces have killed hundreds of civilians in unreported incidents, Taliban attacks have soared and NATO commanders fear neighbouring Pakistan and Iran are fuelling the insurgency".

The Guardian also reported that Daniel Ellsberg has described the disclosure as on the scale of his leaking of the Pentagon Papers in 1971 revealing how the U.S. public was misled about the Vietnam War.

Publication of the material was also one of the first major examples of the use of data journalism by The Guardian, calling it "datajournalism in action".

===== Der Spiegel =====
Der Spiegel wrote that "the editors in chief of Spiegel, The New York Times and The Guardian were 'unanimous in their belief that there is a justified public interest in the material'".

=== Reactions ===
EU An official from the European Union has told The Associated Press "that the organization 'wants to stay as far from this as possible.'

Afghanistan – While the Afghan government has stated that the majority of the leaked documents did not comprise new information, it has expressed concern over both Pakistan's connection with the Taliban and the United States' involvement in their funding. Siamak Herawi, deputy spokesman for the office of the President, stated: "There should be serious action taken against the Inter-Services Intelligence, who has a direct connection with the terrorists. These reports show that the United States was already aware of the ISI connection with the al Qaeda terrorist network. The United States is overdue on the ISI issue, and now the United States, should answer."

Australia – Australian Prime Minister Julia Gillard has stated that the Department of Defence will investigate the content of the leaks to examine what the implications are for Australia, which had 1,500 troops deployed in Afghanistan. This investigation concluded in October 2010 and found that the leaked documents "had not had a direct significant adverse impact on Australia's national interests".

Canada – The Canadian Minister of Foreign Affairs Lawrence Cannon said the leak could endanger Canadian troops. Canada also disputed one of the records, saying it inaccurately described an incident as friendly fire.

Another document suggests that a Canadian was among the casualties in a helicopter that was destroyed by heat-seeking missiles. The document indicates that the United States wanted Canada to put pressure on Saudi Arabia and South Africa, where the United States believed Taliban fundraising was taking place. The documents claim that American diplomats spoke with two senior Canadian Foreign Affairs officials in their appeal for the Canadian government to join the U.S. government in issuing a joint diplomatic rebuke to Saudi Arabia and South Africa. The documents also allege that Canada was asked to rebuke the United Arab Emirates independently over alleged militant fundraising.

One document suggests that a Canadian C-130 Hercules was hit with an anti-aircraft weapon fired by the Taliban during takeoff. The document states that the C-130's landing gear and some of its fuselage was destroyed by a 14.5 mm round as the aircraft departed from the western province of Farah, with the report stating, "It is unusual that insurgents would engage aircraft in such close proximity to an airfield with a weapon of this caliber." The documents also say that a number of Canadian unmanned drones have crashed and that in one instance, locals removed a vehicle's technology before soldiers could recover it.

Cannon refused to comment on the documents, saying that they had "nothing to do with Canada" and denied the Canadian government was misleading its citizens on the war in Afghanistan. New Democratic Party leader Jack Layton said that the documents "undermines the confidence" Canadian citizens have in their government and called on politicians to "get to the bottom of" the situation regarding the friendly fire report.

Germany – The German government has stated that the documents could place its 4,600 troops in danger, and condemns their release. During a meeting in Brussels, Guido Westerwelle, the German Minister for Foreign Affairs, has suggested that the entirety should be "carefully examined, to see what possible new revelations there might be". In general, the government "has shown little alarm over the release of the documents", with a spokesman from the Federal Ministry of Defence stating that there was "nothing newsworthy"; however, opposition party The Greens welcomed the release of the files, with Claudia Roth stating that "[the] WikiLeaks documents prove just how dramatic the situation in Afghanistan is", and "show the lengths the allies are prepared to go to in their fight for more stability".

The Greens also showed distrust in the federal government over the lack of disclosure of U.S. special forces activities in German-controlled areas. Omid Nouripour, the security spokesman for the party, said, "On our reading of the U.S. documents, it is disturbing how little the federal government has informed the parliament about the activities of American special forces in German areas. We demand an immediate explanation from the federal government as to what they know about the missions. We will push with all force for answers."

India – The Ministry of External Affairs said:

We have seen media reports about classified information, supposedly from US government sources, put out in public domain, on support to terrorism by ISI – Pakistan's military intelligence agency. Sponsorship of terrorism, as an instrument of policy, is wholly condemnable and must cease forthwith. The utilisation of territory under Pakistan's control to provide sanctuaries for recruiting and sustaining terrorist groups, and to direct terrorist activity against neighbors, must stop if our region is to attain its full potential for peaceful development.

Pakistan – Pakistani President Asif Ali Zardari announced via spokesman Farhatullah Babar that allegations about ISI's involvement "have been regurgitated in the past. Also, these represent low-level intelligence reports and do not represent a convincing smoking gun. I do not see any convincing evidence." The spokesman continued rhetorically, asking if "those who are alleging that Pakistan is playing a double game are also asserting that President Zardari is presiding over an apparatus that is coordinating attacks on the general headquarters, mosques, shrines, schools and killing Pakistani citizens?" Pakistan's ambassador to the United States Husain Haqqani on Sunday denounced the leak of secret files calling them as "irresponsible", saying it consisted of "unprocessed" reports from the field. "The documents circulated by WikiLeaks do not reflect the current onground realities", he said in a statement.

A senior ISI official denied the allegations, saying they were from raw intelligence reports that had not been verified and were meant to impugn the reputation of the spy agency. He spoke on condition of anonymity in line with the agency's policy. Former ISI Chief Hamid Gul, who headed the agency in the late 1980s when Pakistan and the United States were supporting militants in their fight against the Soviets in Afghanistan, denied the allegations that he was working with the Taliban, saying "these leaked documents against me are fiction and nothing else".

Politicians and defense analysts critically commented on leaks and the western media in using the ISI card while not highlighting most of the civilian casualties resulting from bombing of NATO forces like how U.S. special forces dropped six 2,000 lb bombs on a compound where they believed a "high-value individual" was hiding, after "ensuring there were no innocent Afghans in the surrounding area". In fact, up to 300 civilians had died in those attacks.

United Kingdom – On 28 July, Britain announced that it would launch two new inquiries into the country's role in the war.

United States – National Security Advisor James L. Jones and Pakistan's ambassador to the United States, Husain Haqqani, both condemned WikiLeaks for an "irresponsible" disclosure. "The United States strongly condemns the disclosure of classified information by individuals and organizations which could put the lives of Americans and our partners at risk, and threaten our national security", he said in his statement, "These irresponsible leaks will not impact our ongoing commitment to deepen our partnerships with Afghanistan and Pakistan; to defeat our common enemies; and to support the aspirations of the Afghan and Pakistani people."

- Deputy National Security Advisor for Strategic Communications Ben Rhodes stated that "[since] taking office, President Obama has been very clear and candid with the American people about the challenges that we face in Afghanistan and Pakistan. [...] It is important to note that the time period reflected in the documents is January 2004 to December 2009. The war in Afghanistan was under-resourced for many years. [...] On Dec. 1, 2009, President Obama announced a new strategy and new resources for Afghanistan and Pakistan precisely because of the grave situation there", and that they "strongly condemn the disclosure of classified information by individuals and organizations that put the lives of the U.S. and partner service members at risk and threatens our national security."
- Representative Dennis Kucinich (Democrat) of Ohio said "These documents provide a fuller picture of what we have long known about Afghanistan: The war is going badly. We have to show the ability to respond to what's right in front of our face: This war is no longer justifiable under any circumstances". Senate Foreign Relations Committee chairman Senator John Kerry (Democrat) of Massachusetts said "However illegally these documents came to light, they raise serious questions about the reality of America's policy toward Pakistan and Afghanistan. Those policies are at a critical stage and these documents may very well underscore the stakes and make the calibrations needed to get the policy right more urgent." In a later release he was quoted as saying "All of us [are] concerned that after nine years of war ... the Taliban appear to be as strong as they have been".

Taliban – spokesperson, Zabihullah Mujahid, has stated they are inspecting the leaked documents which contain the names, tribes, and family information of Afghan informants who were helping the United States. "We knew about the spies and people who collaborate with U.S. forces", he said. "We will investigate through our own secret service whether the people mentioned are really spies working for the United States. If they are U.S. spies, then we know how to punish them". This statement comes after the Taliban has recently begun intimidating and brutally executing those who cooperate with NATO forces.

When the New York Times asked former WikiLeaks staff member Daniel Domscheit-Berg if there was blood on Julian Assange's hands after publishing the secret U.S. military Afghan war reports without making sure that the names of Afghan informants were blacked out, Domscheit-Berg said that "if there is no blood on anyone's hands and no one got hurt, then this was just pure luck."

==== United States military ====
U.S. Army officials condemned the public dissemination of military secrets and the White House urged the website WikiLeaks to not publish any more classified documents related to the Afghan war. U.S. Defense Secretary Robert Gates said that it is up to the Justice Department to determine if there would be criminal charges in the release of classified military documents by WikiLeaks, but the website was "morally guilty for putting lives at risk".

On 6 August 2010, U.S. military authorities urged Wikileaks to return the already published 70,000 documents, and the other 15,000 records the website was expected to post soon as well, which contained sensitive details of Afghans who had assisted ISAF forces. Pentagon spokesman Geoff Morrell said "If doing the right thing is not good enough for them, then we will figure out what alternatives we have to compel them to do the right thing." On 7 August 2010, spokesman Daniel Schmitt said that WikiLeaks would continue to publish secret files from governments around the world despite the U.S. demands to cancel plans for further release, claiming that this directly contributed to the public's understanding of the conflict and rejecting allegations that the publication was a threat to America's national security or put lives at risk.

==== Afghan authorities ====
According to a statement by Rangin Dadfar Spanta, security advisor to the Afghan government and a former Minister of Foreign Affairs, the allies of Afghanistan had failed to pay necessary attention to prevent the support for international terrorism and to eliminate its hideouts and centres that can create a major threat to security and stability in the region. "The content of these documents reveal that Afghanistan has been righteous in its stance about the rise of terrorism and political and military discrepancies in counter-terrorism struggle".

==== Council on Foreign Relations ====
Daniel Markey, a senior fellow with the Council on Foreign Relations and former South Asia analyst for the Bush administration, said,

Whether WikiLeaks uncovered anything new isn't actually important – it's on the front page of every newspaper in the country; the media is now focused on Afghanistan, and that makes it a big deal. [...] The public is now more skeptical about the administration's strategy in Afghanistan than they were last week, and that makes it real.

=== Reactions of human rights groups ===
A coalition of five human-rights organizations addressed Julian Assange, founder and editor of WikiLeaks, expressing concerns for the safety of persons identified in the published documents. These human-rights groups were Amnesty International, Campaign for Innocent Victims in Conflict (CIVIC), Open Society Institute (OSI), the Afghanistan Independent Human Rights Commission (AIHRC) and the Kabul office of the International Crisis Group (ICG), all worried about the execution of Afghan civilians by the Taliban and other insurgent groups. The AIHRC published figures showing that executions had soared in the first seven months of 2010 to 197, from a total of 225 in all of 2009. The victims were often persons who supported the Afghan government, or their family members, who may have come into contact with the U.S. or other international forces.

On 12 August 2010, the international press watchdog Reporters Without Borders (RWB) accused WikiLeaks of "incredible irresponsibility" after the website said it "absolutely" would release the remaining 15,000 documents. In an open letter to Assange, Jean-François Julliard, RWB secretary-general, and Clothilde Le Coz, RWB's representative in Washington, D.C., wrote that the publication was "highly dangerous", particularly when it named Afghan informants.

== Legality of the disclosure ==
Ann Woolner wrote in a July 2010 editorial in Bloomberg that WikiLeaks' publication of the documents is legally allowed in the United States because the group did not solicit the documents. By August 2010, the Pentagon had concluded WikiLeaks broke the law. A letter from the Department of Defence general counsel said that "it is the view of the Department of Defence that WikiLeaks obtained this material in circumstances that constitute a violation of US law, and that as long as WikiLeaks holds this material, the violation of the law is ongoing."

== Source of the leak ==
WikiLeaks originally said it did not know the source of the leaked data. Julian Assange stated, "Our whole system is designed such that we don't have to keep that secret". The Pentagon launched an inquiry; Colonel Dave Lapan, a spokesperson for the Pentagon, said that investigators were trying to determine who leaked the material and said that Chelsea Manning, a 22-year-old U.S. Army intelligence analyst, was someone they were "looking at closely" in 2010. In August 2013, Manning was convicted of espionage and other charges for disclosing the Baghdad airstrike video of 2007 (known as "Collateral Murder"), the diplomatic cables leak of 2010 (known as "Cablegate"), and other classified information. That video was made public through WikiLeaks, along with many diplomatic cables, but war logs were not specifically among the charges against Manning at the time.

== "Insurance file" ==
On 30 July, a few days after the initial disclosure, media began to report that WikiLeaks had released an additional file named "insurance.aes256" in connection with the Afghan War Diary disclosure. The new "insurance file" was AES-256 encrypted, 1.4 GB in size, with a timestamp of 31 December 2010 6:00 PM, and with a SHA1 checksum of "cce54d3a8af370213d23fcbfe8cddc8619a0734c". It is also available at the Internet Archive.

At 1.4 GB, that file was 20 times larger than the batch of 77,000 classified U.S. military documents about Afghanistan that WikiLeaks already published, and cryptographers said that the file was virtually impossible to crack, unless WikiLeaks releases the key used to encode the material.
