= David Pallister =

British journalist (1945–2021)

- Born: David Pallister Clark; 15 March 1945; Newcastle, England
- Died: 4 September 2021 (aged 76)
- Education: University of Liverpool
- Occupation: Investigative journalist
- Spouse: Lynn Winterburn (m. 1967, divorced) Aswini Weereratne (m. 1997)
- Children: 1

David Pallister (born as David Pallister Clark; 15 March 1945 – 4 September 2021) was a British investigative journalist. He worked on The Guardian for many years, specialising in miscarriages of justice, the arms trade, corruption in international business, and British and international politics, terrorism and terrorist financing (post 9/11), mercenaries, race relations and Africa. For ten years from 1983 he was The Guardian's London-based correspondent for Nigeria; he also covered the Lebanese Civil War, the Ethiopian famine and the Sri Lankan civil war. He changed his name to avoid confusion with another journalist with the same name who was a co-founder of The Leveller magazine.

== Biography ==
David Pallister was born on 15 March 1945 in Newcastle, England, to Matthew Clark, a civil engineer, and Joan (nee Mordue), who was a college registrar. He studied history at the University of Liverpool, graduating in 1967. He began working as a reporter on the Stockport Express, going on to the Manchester Free Press and the Manchester Evening News. In 1974, he joined The Guardian, where his commitment was to investigative journalism. Notable stories he covered included the death of Blair Peach and the cases of the Guildford Four and the Birmingham Six. His international coverage in the 1980s and '90s focused on Africa, particularly the political elections in Nigeria, as well as Ethiopia; he also wrote on the civil wars in Sri Lanka and Lebanon. He worked for the Guardian until leaving the paper in 2009.

He was centrally involved as a personal libel defendant in the dénouement of Jonathan Aitken, causing Aitken to be convicted and jailed for perjury.

Pallister was a member of the Guardian teams for the British Press Awards for the Neil Hamilton Affair (1997) and the Aitken case (1998). He won a Project Censored Award from Sonoma State University (2002, with Greg Palast) on the failure of the FBI to investigate the Bin Laden family. In 1999 his reporting of the Stephen Lawrence case was shortlisted for a Commission for Racial Equality media award.

He was the author (with Sarah Stewart and Ian Lepper) of South Africa Inc.: The Oppenheimer Empire (Simon & Schuster, 1987). He helped Gerry Conlon of the Guildford Four with his autobiography, Proved Innocent (Hamish Hamilton, 1990). With Luke Harding and David Leigh, Pallister was an author of The Liar: The Fall of Jonathan Aitken (Penguin, 1997).

In 2012, Pallister joined the investigative news website Exaro, writing about unrest at Lonmin's platinum mine in Marikana, South Africa. He was on the editorial advisory board of the Bureau of Investigative Journalism.
