= United States diplomatic cables leak =

2010–2011 release of 251,287 diplomatic cables

Cablegate
- Description: Release of 251,287 United States diplomatic cables
- Dates of cables: 1966–2010
- Period of release: 18 February 2010 – 1 September 2011
- Key publishers: El País, Der Spiegel, Le Monde, The Guardian, The New York Times, WikiLeaks
- Related articles: Afghan War documents leak, Iraq War documents leak
- Subject: Data protection, First Amendment, freedom of information, freedom of speech

An incident, commonly referred to as Cablegate, began on 28 November 2010 when WikiLeaks began releasing classified cables that had been sent to the U.S. State Department by 274 of its consulates, embassies, and diplomatic missions around the world. Dated between December 1966 and February 2010, the cables contain diplomatic analysis from world leaders, and the diplomats' assessment of host countries and their officials.

On 30 July 2013, Chelsea Manning was convicted for theft of the cables and violations of the Espionage Act in a court martial proceeding and sentenced to thirty-five years imprisonment. She was released on 17 May 2017, after seven years total confinement, after her sentence had been commuted by President Barack Obama earlier that year.

== Sequence of leaks ==
The first document, the so-called Reykjavik 13 cable, was released by WikiLeaks on 18 February 2010, and was followed by the release of State Department profiles of Icelandic politicians a month later. Later that year, Julian Assange, WikiLeaks' editor-in-chief, reached an agreement with media partners in Europe and the United States to publish the rest of the cables in redacted form, removing the names of sources and others in vulnerable positions. On 28 November, the first 220 cables were published under this agreement by El País (Spain), Der Spiegel (Germany), Le Monde (France), The Guardian (United Kingdom), and The New York Times (United States). WikiLeaks had planned to release the rest over several months; 2,017 had been published as of 11 January 2011.

The remaining cables were published in September 2011 after a series of events compromised the security of a WikiLeaks file containing the cables. This included WikiLeaks volunteers placing an encrypted file containing all WikiLeaks data online as "insurance" in July 2010, in case something happened to the organization. In February 2011 David Leigh of The Guardian published the encryption passphrase in a book; he had received it from Assange so he could access a copy of the Cablegate file, and believed the passphrase was a temporary one, unique to that file. In August 2011, German weekly Der Freitag published some of these details, enabling others to piece the information together and decrypt the Cablegate files. The cables were then available online, fully unredacted. In response, WikiLeaks decided on 1 September 2011 to publish all 251,287 unedited documents.

The publication of the cables was the third in a series of U.S. classified document leaks distributed by WikiLeaks in 2010, following the Afghan War documents leak in July, and the Iraq War documents leak in October. Over 130,000 of the cables are unclassified, some 100,000 are labeled "confidential", around 15,000 have the higher classification "secret", and none are classified as "top secret" on the classification scale.

== Background ==
In June 2010, the magazine Wired reported that the U.S. State Department and embassy personnel were concerned that Chelsea Manning, a United States Army soldier charged with the unauthorized download of classified material while stationed in Iraq, had leaked diplomatic cables. WikiLeaks rejected the report as inaccurate: "Allegations in Wired that we have been sent 260,000 classified U.S. embassy cables are, as far as we can tell, incorrect".

However, during that same month (June 2010), The Guardian had been offered "half a million military dispatches from the battlefields of Afghanistan and Iraq. There might be more after that, including an immense bundle of confidential diplomatic cables", and Alan Rusbridger, the editor of The Guardian had contacted Bill Keller, editor of The New York Times, to see if he would be interested in sharing the dissemination of the information.

Manning was suspected to have uploaded all that was obtained to WikiLeaks, which chose to release the material in stages so as to have the greatest possible impact.

According to The Guardian, all the diplomatic cables were marked "Sipdis", denoting "secret internet protocol distribution", which means they had been distributed via the closed U.S. SIPRNet, the U.S. Department of Defense's classified version of the civilian internet. More than three million U.S. government personnel and soldiers have access to this network. Documents marked "top secret" are not included in the system. Such a large quantity of secret information was available to a wide audience because, as The Guardian alleged, after the 11 September attacks an increased focus had been placed on sharing information since gaps in intra-governmental information sharing had been exposed. More specifically, the diplomatic, military, law enforcement, and intelligence communities would be able to do their jobs better with this easy access to analytic and operative information. A spokesman said that in the previous weeks and months additional measures had been taken to improve the security of the system and prevent leaks.

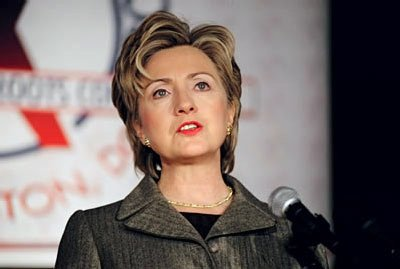
Before the release, United States Secretary of State Hillary Clinton discussed the leak with diplomats.

On 22 November, an announcement was made via WikiLeaks' Twitter feed that the next release would be "7× the size of the Iraq War Logs". U.S. authorities and the media had speculated, at the time, that they could contain diplomatic cables. Prior to the expected leak, the government of the United Kingdom (UK) sent a DA-Notice to UK newspapers, which requested advance notice from newspapers regarding the expected publication. Index on Censorship pointed out that "there is no obligation on [the] media to comply". Under the terms of a DA-Notice, "[n]ewspaper editors would speak to [the] Defence, Press and Broadcasting Advisory Committee prior to publication". The Guardian was revealed to have been the source of the copy of the documents given to The New York Times in order to prevent the British government from obtaining any injunction against its publication. The Pakistani newspaper Dawn stated that the U.S. newspapers The New York Times and The Washington Post were expected to publish parts of the diplomatic cables on 28 November, including 94 Pakistan-related documents.

On 26 November, Assange sent a letter to the U.S. Department of State, via his lawyer Jennifer Robinson, inviting them to "privately nominate any specific instances (record numbers or names) where it considers the publication of information would put individual persons at significant risk of harm that has not already been addressed". Harold Koh, the Legal Adviser of the Department of State, rejected the proposal, stating: "We will not engage in a negotiation regarding the further release or dissemination of illegally obtained U.S. Government classified materials". Koh added that the material was acquired illegally and "as long as WikiLeaks holds such material, the violation of the law is ongoing". Assange responded by writing back to the U.S. State Department that "you have chosen to respond in a manner which leads me to conclude that the supposed risks are entirely fanciful and you are instead concerned to suppress evidence of human rights abuse and other criminal behaviour". Ahead of the leak, United States Secretary of State Hillary Clinton and other American officials contacted governments in several countries about the impending release.

== Release ==
=== November 2010 release of redacted cables ===
The five newspapers that had obtained an advance copy of all leaked cables began releasing the cables on 28 November 2010, and WikiLeaks made the cables selected by these newspapers and redacted by their journalists available on its website. "They are releasing the documents we selected", Le Monde's managing editor, Sylvie Kauffmann, said in an interview.

WikiLeaks aimed to release the cables in phases over several months due to their global scope and significance. The first batch of leaks released comprised 220 cables. Further cables were subsequently made available on the WikiLeaks website. The full set of cables published by WikiLeaks can be browsed and searched by a variety of websites.

==== Contents ====
Contents of the 251,287 cables
Subject	Documents
External political relations	145,451
Internal government affairs	122,896
Human rights	55,211
Economic conditions	49,044
Terrorists and terrorism	28,801
UN Security Council	6,532

The contents of the U.S. diplomatic cables leak describe in detail events and incidents surrounding international affairs from 274 embassies dating from 28 December 1966 to 28 February 2010. The diplomatic cables revealed numerous unguarded comments and revelations: US diplomats gathering personal information about Ban Ki-moon, Secretary-General of the United Nations, and other top UN officials; critiques and praises about the host countries of various U.S. embassies, discussion and resolutions towards ending ongoing tension in the Middle East, efforts for and resistance against nuclear disarmament, actions in the war on terror, assessments of other threats around the world, dealings between various countries, U.S. intelligence and counterintelligence efforts, U.S. support of dictatorship and other diplomatic actions.

The leaked cables revealed that diplomats of the U.S. and Britain eavesdropped on Secretary General Kofi Annan in the weeks before the U.S.-led invasion of Iraq in 2003, in apparent violation of international treaties prohibiting spying at the UN. The intelligence information the diplomats were ordered to gather included biometric information, passwords, and personal encryption keys used in private and commercial networks for official communications. It also included Internet and intranet usernames, e-mail addresses, web site URLs useful for identification, credit card numbers, frequent flier account numbers, and work schedules. The targeted human intelligence was requested in a process known as the National Humint Collection Directive, and was aimed at foreign diplomats of US allies as well. WikiLeaks released the cable on 28 November 2010.

The Critical Foreign Dependencies Initiative was contained in a February 2009 diplomatic cable to the U.S. Secretary of State, Hillary Clinton, which was leaked, redacted and released by WikiLeaks in 2010. On 6 December 2010, the BBC called it "one of the most sensitive" leaks. WikiLeaks removed only a minority of the details of names and locations, and left the rest uncensored; details of the exact location of the assets were not included in the list. The list included critical facilities for the global supply chain, global communications, and economically important goods and services.

An investigation into two senior Zimbabwe army commanders who communicated with US Ambassador Charles A. Ray was launched, with the two facing a possible court martial. On 14 September the Committee to Protect Journalists said that an Ethiopian journalist named in the cables was forced to flee the country but WikiLeaks accused the CPJ of distorting the situation "for marketing purposes". Al Jazeera replaced its news director, Wadah Khanfar, on 20 September after he was identified in the cables. The naming of mainland China residents reportedly "sparked an online witch-hunt by Chinese nationalist groups, with some advocating violence against those now known to have met with U.S. Embassy staff." US officials said the damage caused was limited.

One of the leaked documents included comments sent to the US State Department by Philip Alston, United Nations special rapporteur on Extrajudicial, Summary, or Arbitrary Executions regarding the Ishaqi incident. Alston stated that US forces handcuffed and executed the residents of a house on 15 March 2006. The residents included five children under 5 years of age. Autopsies later confirmed that "all the corpses were shot in the head and handcuffed". The US said their troops had been fired on when they approached the house and the people were killed by a support air raid. A US inquiry three months later determined that the soldiers had acted according to the rules of engagement in taking down a safe house. The Iraqi government then said they would open an inquiry. In September 2011, the Iraqi government said they would reopen their investigation into the incident as a result of the publication of the cable. Iraqi officials said that the cable was sufficient cause to deny the Americans any bases and demand that all troops leave.

In December 2010, Der Spiegel reported that one of the cables showed that the US had placed pressure on Germany not to pursue the 13 suspected CIA agents involved in the 2003 abduction of Khalid El-Masri, a German citizen. The abduction was probably carried out through "extraordinary rendition". German prosecutors in Munich had issued arrest warrants for the 13 suspected CIA operatives involved in the abduction. The cables released by Wikileaks showed that after contact from the then-Deputy US Ambassador John M. Koenig and US diplomats the Munich public prosecutor's office and Germany's Justice Ministry and Foreign Ministry all cooperated with the US and the agents were not extradited to Germany.

==== Coverage ====
The Guardian released its coverage of the leaked cables in numerous articles, including an interactive database, starting on 28 November. El País released its report saying there was an agreement between the newspapers for simultaneous publication of the "internationally relevant" documents, but that each newspaper was free to select and treat those documents that primarily relate to its own country. Der Spiegel also released its preliminary report, with extended coverage promised for the next day. Its cover for 29 November was also leaked with the initial report.

The New York Times initially covered the story in a nine-part series spanning nine days, with the first story published simultaneously with the other outlets. The New York Times was not originally intended to receive the leak, allegedly due to its unflattering portrayal of the site's founder, but The Guardian decided to share coverage, citing earlier cooperation while covering the Afghan and Iraqi war logs. The Washington Post reported that it also requested permission to see the documents, but was rejected for undisclosed reasons. CNN was originally supposed to receive an advance copy of the documents as well, but did not after it refused to sign a confidentiality agreement with WikiLeaks. The Wall Street Journal also refused advance access, apparently for similar reasons as CNN.

The Russian weekly newspaper Russky Reporter (Русский Репортёр) has published a large number of cables, both in English and in Russian translation. Some of their reporting was criticised for being inaccurate and posting misleading translations of cables. Russky Reporter denied misleading readers, and said they had early access to WikiLeaks cables through Israel Shamir. Yulia Latynina, writing in The Moscow Times, alleged that Shamir concocted a cable which allegedly quoted European Union diplomats' plans to walk out of the Durban II speech by Iranian president Mahmoud Ahmadinejad, for publication in the pro-Putin Russky Reporter in December 2010. Shamir has denied this accusation. The Lebanese daily newspaper Al-Akhbar published about 183 cables on 2 December 2010. Australian-based Fairfax Media obtained access to the cables under a separate arrangement. Fairfax newspapers began releasing their own stories based on the leaked cables on 7 December 2010. The Cuban government-run website Razones de Cuba started publishing Spanish translations of WikiLeaks documents on 23 December 2010.

The Swedish newspapers Svenska Dagbladet and Aftonbladet started reporting on the leaks in early December 2010. In Norway Verdens Gang (VG) brought the first leaks concerning the United States and the Norwegian government on 7 December. Aftenposten, a Norwegian daily newspaper, reported on 17 December 2010 that it had gained access to the full cable set of 251,287 documents. While it is unclear how it received the documents, they were apparently not obtained directly from WikiLeaks. Aftenposten started releasing cables that were not available in the official WikiLeaks distribution. As of 5 January 2011, it had released just over one hundred cables unpublished by WikiLeaks, with about a third of these related to Sri Lanka, and many related to Norway. Politiken, a Danish daily newspaper, announced on 8 January 2011 that it had obtained access to the full set of cables.

NRC, a Dutch daily newspaper, and RTL Nieuws, a Dutch television news service, announced on 14 January 2011 that they had gained access to the about 3,000 cables sent from The Hague, via Aftenposten. NOS announced on the same day that it had obtained these same cables from WikiLeaks. Die Welt, a German daily newspaper, announced on 17 January 2011 that they had gained access to the full set of cables, via Aftenposten. The Costa Rican newspaper La Nación announced on 1 March 2011 it had received 827 cables from WikiLeaks which it started publishing the next day. 764 of these were sent from the U.S. Embassy in San José while 63 were sent from other embassies and deal with Costa Rican affairs.

The Ecuadorian newspaper El Universo started releasing 343 cables related to the Ecuadorian government and institutions on 6 April 2011. The publication was done the day after the Spanish newspaper El País published a cable in which the ambassador Heather Hodges showed concerns regarding corruption in the Ecuadorian National Police, especially of Gral. Jaime Hurtado Vaca, former Police commander. The ambassador was later declared persona non grata and was requested to leave the country as soon as possible.

Several of the newspapers coordinating with WikiLeaks have published some of the cables on their own websites.

=== September 2011 release of mostly unredacted cables ===
In August 2010, Assange gave Guardian journalist David Leigh an encryption key and a URL where he could locate the full Cablegate file. In February 2011, shortly before Domscheit-Berg's book appeared, Leigh and Luke Harding, another Guardian journalist, published WikiLeaks: Inside Julian Assange's War on Secrecy via Guardian Books. In it, Leigh revealed the encryption key Assange had given him.

The key to the document is: ACollectionOfDiplomaticHistorySince_ 1966_ToThe_PresentDay#.

The encrypted file was placed in a hidden sub-folder on the WikiLeaks web server on which it had been placed to aid in transferring the file from WikiLeaks to Leigh and not removed due to an oversight. When the WikiLeaks website experienced denial-of-service attacks, mirror sites were set up and supporters created and shared a compressed BitTorrent of the entire site, including the hidden sub-folder. On 25 August 2011, the German magazine Der Freitag published an article about it, and while it left out the crucial details, there was enough to allow others to begin piecing the information together. The story was also published in the Danish newspaper Dagbladet Information and the US Embassy in London and the US State Department were notified the same day.

Denn der Freitag hat eine Datei, die auch unredigierte US-Botschaftsdepeschen enthält. ... Die Datei mit dem Namen "cables.csv" ist 1,73 Gigabyte groß. ... Das Passwort zu dieser Datei liegt offen zutage und ist für Kenner der Materie zu identifizieren.

Because der Freitag have discovered a file on the internet which includes the unredacted embassy files. ... The file is called "cables.csv" and is 1.73 gigabytes in size. ... The password for this file is plain to see and identifiable for someone familiar with the material.

— Steffen Kraft

On 29 August, WikiLeaks published over 130,000 unredacted cables. On 31 August, WikiLeaks tweeted a link to a torrent of the encrypted data. On 1 September 2011, WikiLeaks announced that an encrypted version of the un-redacted US State Department cables had been available for months. WikiLeaks said that it would publish the entire, unredacted archive in searchable form on its website the next day.

The unredacted cables were published by Cryptome a day before WikiLeaks. Cryptome's owner, John Young, testified in 2020 that Cryptome has never been asked by US law enforcement to remove the unredacted cables and that they remain online.

On 2 September, WikiLeaks published searchable, unredacted copies of all of the cables on their website.

According to Glenn Greenwald, WikiLeaks decided that the "safest course was to release all the cables in full, so that not only the world's intelligence agencies but everyone had them, so that steps could be taken to protect the sources and so that the information in them was equally available." According to The Guardian, "the newly published archive" contained "more than 1,000 cables identifying individual activists; several thousand labelled with a tag used by the US to mark sources it believes could be placed in danger; and more than 150 specifically mentioning whistleblowers".

==== Consequences of the release ====
On 2 September 2011, Australia's attorney general, Robert McClelland, released a statement that the unredacted cables identified at least one ASIO officer, and that it was a crime in Australia to publish information which could identify an intelligence officer. McClelland said that "On occasions before this week, WikiLeaks redacted identifying features where the safety of individuals or national security could be put at risk. It appears this hasn't occurred with documents that have been distributed across the internet this week." According to The Guardian at the time, this meant "Julian Assange could face prosecution in Australia."

After WikiLeaks published the unredacted cables, some journalists and contacts of the US government allegedly faced retaliation. For example according to media reports, Ethiopian journalist Argaw Ashine was interrogated several times about a reference to him in a cable talking to a government source. The source told him about plans to arrest the editors of the critical Ethiopian weekly Addis Neger. The editors for Addis Neger fled the country the next month. Ashine was subjected to government harassment and intimidation, and was forced to flee the country. According to the former US Ambassador to Cameroon from 2004 to 2007, Niels Marquardt, Marafa Hamidou Yaya was arrested on "entirely unproven corruption charges", subjected to a "kangaroo court", and given a 25-year prison sentence. Marquardt said Marafa's only real crime was having told him that he "might be interested" in the presidency one day. When the cable was released, it became frontpage news in Cameroon and led directly to Marafa's arrest. The Ambassador at the time, Robert Jackson, said Marafa's trial did not specify the evidence against him.

The U.S. established an Information Review Task Force (IRTF) to investigate the impact of WikiLeaks' publications. In 2013, Brigadier general Robert Carr, who headed the IRTF, testified at Chelsea Manning's sentencing hearing that the task force had found no specific examples of anyone who had lost his or her life in reprisals due WikiLeaks' publication of material provided by Manning. Ed Pilkington wrote in The Guardian that Carr's testimony significantly undermined the argument that WikiLeaks' publications put lives at risk. According to IRTF reports, "the lives of cooperating Afghans, Iraqis, and other foreign interlocutors have been placed at increased risk" because of the leaks. The reports said that the leaks could also cause "serious damage" to "intelligence sources, informants and the Afghan population". A damage assessment by the IRTF, 111,000 IED-related documents in the leaks "may lead to the compromise of Counter IED tactics, techniques and procedures used by Coalition Forces conducting exploitation of IED events". In 2020, a lawyer for the US said that "sources, whose redacted names and other identifying information was contained in classified documents published by Wikileaks, who subsequently disappeared, although the US can't prove at this point that their disappearance was the result of being outed by Wikileaks."

== 2010-2011 reactions to the releases ==
Reactions to the leak in 2010 varied. Western governments expressed strong disapproval, while the material generated intense interest from the public and journalists. Some political leaders referred to Assange as a criminal, while blaming the U.S. Department of Defense for security lapses. Supporters of Assange referred to him in November 2010 as a key defender of free speech and freedom of the press. Reaction to the release in September 2011 of the unredacted cables attracted stronger criticism, and was condemned by the five newspapers that had first published the cables in redacted form in November 2010.

U.S. Secretary of State Hillary Clinton responded to the leaks saying, "This disclosure is not just an attack on America's foreign policy; it is an attack on the international community, the alliances and partnerships, the conventions and negotiations that safeguard global security and advance economic prosperity." Julian Assange is quoted as saying, "Of course, abusive, Titanic organizations, when exposed, grasp at all sorts of ridiculous straws to try and distract the public from the true nature of the abuse." John Perry Barlow, co-founder of the Electronic Frontier Foundation, wrote a tweet saying: "The first serious infowar is now engaged. The field of battle is WikiLeaks. You are the troops."

=== Denial-of-service attack ===
About an hour prior to the planned release of the initial documents, WikiLeaks announced it was experiencing a massive distributed denial-of-service attack (DDoS), but vowed to still release the cables and documents via pre-agreed prominent media outlets El País, Le Monde, Der Spiegel, The Guardian, and The New York Times.

According to Arbor Networks, an Internet-analyst group, the DDoS attack accounted for between two and four gigabits per second (Gbit/s) of additional traffic to the WikiLeaks host network, compared to an average traffic of between twelve and fifteen Gbit/s under ordinary conditions. The attack was slightly more powerful than ordinary DDoS attacks, though well below the maximum of 60 to 100 Gbit/s of other major attacks during 2010.

On 2 December 2010, EveryDNS, who provide a free DNS hosting service, dropped WikiLeaks from its entries, citing DDoS attacks that "threatened the stability of its infrastructure", but the site was copied and made available at many other addresses, an example of the Streisand effect.

=== Dropping of hosting, finance services, and accessibility ===
Amazon.com removed WikiLeaks from its servers on 1 December 2010 at 19:30 GMT, and the latter website was unreachable until 20:17 GMT when the site had defaulted to its Swedish servers, hosted by Bahnhof.

U.S. Senator Joe Lieberman, among the members of the U.S. Senate Homeland Security and Governmental Affairs Committee who had questioned Amazon in private communication on the company's hosting of WikiLeaks and the illegally obtained documents, commended Amazon for the action; WikiLeaks, however, responded by stating on its official Twitter page that "WikiLeaks servers at Amazon ousted. Free speech the land of the free—fine our $ are now spent to employ people in Europe", and later that "If Amazon are so uncomfortable with the first amendment, they should get out of the business of selling books".

On 2 December 2010, Tableau Software withdrew its visualizations from the contents of the leak, stating that it was directly due to political pressure from Joe Lieberman.

On 4 December, PayPal cut off the account used by WikiLeaks to collect donations.

On 6 December, the Swiss bank PostFinance announced that it had frozen the assets of Assange; on the same day, MasterCard stopped payments to WikiLeaks, with Visa following them on 7 December.

Official efforts by the U.S. government to limit access to, conversation about, and general spread of the cables leaked by WikiLeaks were revealed by leading media organizations. A 4 December 2010 article by MSNBC reported that the Obama administration had warned federal government employees and students in educational institutions studying towards careers in public service that they must refrain from downloading or linking to any WikiLeaks documents. However, State Department spokesman P.J. Crowley denied ordering students, stating, "We do not control private networks. We have issued no authoritative instructions to people who are not employees of the Department of State." He said the warning was from an "overzealous employee." According to a December 2010 article in The Guardian, access to WikiLeaks was blocked on government computers because the information was still classified.

A spokesman for Columbia University confirmed on 4 December that its Office of Career Services sent an e-mail warning students at Columbia's School of International and Public Affairs to refrain from accessing WikiLeaks cables and discussing this subject on the grounds that "discourse about the documents would call into question your ability to deal with confidential information". However, this was quickly retracted on the following day. SIPA Dean John Henry Coatsworth wrote that "Freedom of information and expression is a core value of our institution, ... thus, SIPA's position is that students have a right to discuss and debate any information in the public arena that they deem relevant to their studies or to their roles as global citizens, and to do so without fear of adverse consequences."

The New York Times reported on 14 December that the U.S. Air Force bars its personnel from access to news sites (such as those of The New York Times and The Guardian) that publish leaked cables.

On 18 December, the Bank of America stopped handling payments for WikiLeaks.

=== Anonymous and anti-censorship ===
In response to perceived federal and corporate censorship of the cable leaks, internet group Anonymous launched DDoS attacks on several websites. So far, the websites of the Swedish prosecutor, PostFinance (the Swiss post-office banking company), MasterCard and Visa have all been targeted.

The websites of the government of Zimbabwe were targeted by Anonymous with DDoS attacks due to censorship of the WikiLeaks documents. The websites of the government of Tunisia were targeted by Anonymous due to censorship of the WikiLeaks documents and the Tunisian revolution. Tunisians were reported to be assisting in these denial-of-service attacks launched by Anonymous. Anonymous's role in the DDoS attacks on the Tunisian government's websites has led to an upsurge of internet activism among Tunisians against the government. Anonymous released an online message denouncing the government clampdown on recent protests and posted it on the Tunisian government website. Anonymous has named their attacks "Operation Tunisia". Anonymous successfully DDoSsed eight Tunisian government websites. They plan attacks in Internet Relay Chat networks. Someone attacked Anonymous's website with a DDoS on 5 January.

=== Manipulation of news based on WikiLeaks cables ===
On 9 December 2010, major Pakistani newspapers (such as The News International, The Express Tribune and the Daily Jang) and television channels carried stories that claimed to detail U.S. diplomats' assessments of senior Indian generals as "vain, egotistical and genocidal", also saying "India's government is secretly allied with Hindu fundamentalists", and that "Indian spies are covertly supporting Islamist militants in Pakistan's tribal belt and Balochistan." However, none of the cables revealed any such assessments. The claims were credited to an Islamabad-based news service agency that frequently ran pro-Pakistan Army stories.

Later, The News International admitted the story "was dubious and may have been planted", and The Express Tribune offered "profuse" apologies to readers. Urdu-language papers such as the Daily Jang, however, declined to retract the story.

=== Twitter subpoena ===
On 14 December 2010, a U.S. federal court subpoenaed Twitter for extensive information regarding WikiLeaks, but also put on a gagging order. The order was said to be part of an "ongoing criminal investigation", and required information regarding the Twitter accounts of WikiLeaks, Assange, Manning, Rop Gonggrijp, Jacob Appelbaum, and Birgitta Jonsdottir. According to Glenn Greenwald, the court "gave Twitter three days to respond and barred the company from notifying anyone, including the users, of the existence of the Order." Twitter requested that it be allowed to notify the users, giving them ten days to object. The court order was unsealed on 5 January 2011, and Jonsdottir decided to publicly fight the order.

Elected representatives of Iceland have declared such actions by the U.S. government "serious", "peculiar", "outlandish", and akin to heavy breathing on the telephone. The published subpoena text demands "you are to provide ... subscriber names, user names ... mailing addresses, residential addresses, business addresses ... telephone number[s]... credit card or bank account number[s]... billing records", "as well as 'destination email addresses and IP addresses". As of 10 January 2011, there were 636,759 followers of the WikiLeaks Twitter feed with destination email addresses and IP addresses.

=== Tunisian revolution and Arab Spring ===
The cable leaks have been pointed to as a catalyst for the 2010–2011 Tunisian revolution and government overthrow. Foreign Policy magazine said, "We might also count Tunisia as the first time that WikiLeaks pushed people over the brink." Additionally, The New York Times said, "The protesters ... found grist for the complaints in leaked cables from the United States Embassy in Tunisia, released by WikiLeaks, that detailed the self-dealing and excess of the president's family."

It is widely believed that the Tunisian revolution then spread to other parts of the Middle East, turning into the Arab Spring.

=== Unredacted cable reactions ===
After the unredacted cables became available online, WikiLeaks added them to their searchable database. The release was condemned by WikiLeaks' media partners, the Guardian, New York Times, El Pais, Der Spiegel and Le Monde, who said it put sources at risk of dismissal, detention and physical harm. The organisations published a joint statement that WikiLeaks disputed.

We deplore the decision of WikiLeaks to publish the unredacted state department cables, which may put sources at risk. Our previous dealings with WikiLeaks were on the clear basis that we would only publish cables which had been subjected to a thorough joint editing and clearance process. We will continue to defend our previous collaborative publishing endeavour. We cannot defend the needless publication of the complete data – indeed, we are united in condemning it. The decision to publish by Julian Assange was his, and his alone.

The publication was also condemned by Reporters Without Borders and the Index On Censorship. After the publication, Reporters Without Borders temporarily suspended their WikiLeaks mirror and criticized the group, saying the decision could put journalists in danger.

Glenn Greenwald commented that it was "a disaster from every angle" and criticised WikiLeaks, The Guardian 's David Leigh, and Open Leaks' Daniel Domscheit-Berg. According to Greenwald, "it's possible that diplomatic sources identified in the cables (including whistleblowers and human rights activists) will be harmed; this will be used by enemies of transparency and WikiLeaks to disparage both and even fuel efforts to prosecute the group; it implicates a newspaper, The Guardian, that generally produces very good and responsible journalism; it likely increases political pressure to impose more severe punishment on Bradley Manning if he's found guilty of having leaked these cables; and it will completely obscure the already-ignored, important revelations of serious wrongdoing from these documents." Greenwald and other commentators have agreed with WikiLeaks' rationale for the release of unredacted cables.

Leigh was criticized by several commentators, including Glenn Greenwald, who called the publication of the password "reckless", arguing that, even if it had been a temporary one, publishing it divulged the type of passwords WikiLeaks was using. WikiLeaks said it was pursuing pre-litigation action against The Guardian for an alleged breach of a confidentiality agreement. Leigh disclaimed responsibility for the release, saying Assange had assured him the password would expire hours after it was disclosed to him. Mark Davis, a journalist who was present while Assange worked with the media during the publication of the Afghan War logs, said that claims that Assange was callous about harm that might be caused by disclosures were lies, and that if there was a cavalier attitude it was the Guardian journalists who had a disdain for the impact of the material.

A Defense Department spokesman criticised WikiLeaks over it, saying "what we have said all along about the danger of these types of things is reinforced by the fact that there are now documents out there in unredacted form containing the names of individuals whose lives are at risk because they are named. Once WikiLeaks has these documents in its possession, it loses control and information gets out whether they intend [it] to or not."

== See also ==
- List of public disclosures of classified information
- Pentagon Papers
- Classified information in the United States
- Chagossians
- Foreign policy of the United States
- Israeli retaliation leak
- New York Times Co. v. United States (1971)
