= Task Force 373 =

Joint commando unit in the Afghanistan War

Task Force 373 (TF373) was a joint military commando unit that was active in the War in Afghanistan.

The unit became prominent when the clandestine operations were brought to public attention by the release of the Afghan War Diary on WikiLeaks on 25 July 2010. It has been claimed that the unit was stationed at Camp Marmal, the German field base in Mazar-e-Sharif.

The leaked information shows that Task Force 373 used at least three bases in Afghanistan, in Kabul, Kandahar, and Khost. Although it worked alongside special forces from Afghanistan and other coalition nations, it appeared to draw its troops primarily from U.S. Special Operations forces, among others the 7th Special Forces Group, 160th SOAR, Navy SEALs, and MARSOC Marines. It is loosely based on the JSOC task forces such as Task Force 121, Task Force 145, Task Force 20, Task Force 6-26, and Task Force 88.

== Operations ==
It has been reported that the unit's mission was to "deactivate" suspected senior Taliban, by either killing or capturing them. During missions prisoners have been taken. Information contained in The War Logs includes at least 62 instances of detainee transfers where the source of the detainee is stated as being "TF373".

In an article datelined 25 July 2010, The Guardian reported that "In many cases, the unit has set out to seize a target for internment, but in others it has simply killed them without attempting to capture. The logs reveal that TF 373 has also killed civilian men, women and children and even Afghan police officers who have strayed into its path." The newspaper report also stated that "Details of more than 2,000 senior figures from the Taliban and al-Qaida are named on a 'kill or capture' list, known as JPEL." Secrecy is a major concern of TF373 and often operations are not discussed even after the fact with coalition allies. Allegations of extrajudicial killing have raised questions about the legality of the operations.

The New York Times confirmed the existence of TF373 and its work in connection with a kill or capture list but gave a lower number, "about 70," for the number of targets on the list. "These missions, which have been stepped up under the Obama administration, claim notable successes, but have sometimes gone wrong, killing civilians and stoking Afghan resentment."
