= Joseph Muriuki =

Kenyan actor

- Born: Joseph Kinyua Muriuki; January 31, 1984 (age 42); Eastleigh, Kenya
- Other names: Joe Kinyua
- Education: Visions Professional Institute
- Occupation: Actor
- Years active: 2008–present
- Known for: The Fifth Estate

Joseph 'Joe' Kinyua Muriuki (born 31 January 1984), is a Kenyan actor particularly active in American cinema. He is best known for the role in the film The Fifth Estate.

== Personal life ==
He was born on 31 January 1984 in Eastleigh, Nairobi, Kenya. He later grew up in Nairobi and attended primary and secondary school in Kasarani. After finishing school, he studied accounting at Visions Professional Institute. Meanwhile, he found a job at Aga Khan University Hospital and worked four years there.

== Career ==
In 2008, he was invited to appear in the comedy Will You Still Love Me in the Morning, co-directed by Brian Clemens and Dennis Spooners and produced by Festival of Creative arts. Then he continued to work parallel on both theater and television, locally and internationally. His maiden international appearance came through Wikileaks film The Fifth Estate produced as a DreamWorks movie. In the film, he played a supportive role as a journalist 'John Paul Oulu'.

== Filmography ==
Year	Film	Role	Genre	Ref.
2010	Noose of Gold	Doc	TV series	
2013	The Fifth Estate	John Paul Oulu	Film	
2015	How to Find a Husband	Thomas	TV series	
2017	Sue Na Jonnie	Johnny	TV series	
2019	Njoro Wa Uba	Washington Njoroge	TV series	
