= Mafia State (book) =

2011 book by Luke Harding

Mafia State: How one reporter became an enemy of the brutal new Russia
- Author: Luke Harding
- Language: English
- Subjects: Espionage, politics of Russia
- Published: London
- Publisher: Guardian Books
- Publication place: United Kingdom
- Media type: Print (hardcover and paperback)
- Pages: 310
- ISBN: 9780852652497
- Dewey Decimal: 327.120947

Mafia State: How one reporter became an enemy of the brutal new Russia is a 2011 book by British journalist Luke Harding.

== Synopsis ==
Mafia State recounts Harding's period as Russia correspondent for Britain's Guardian newspaper and the surveillance and espionage he was subject to; he alleges the Federal Security Service (FSB) was involved.

== Reception ==
In The Guardian A.D. Miller wrote "the importance of Luke Harding's book lies in its first-hand account of a relatively mild but telling bout of state-sponsored harassment" whilst in the New Statesman David Clark of the Russian Foundation described the book as "absorbing" and wrote "the author's descriptive powers and his insights into the mentality and techniques of Putinism are enough to make Mafia State an essential read, but events have conspired to make it a timely one as well". A lengthy review was also published in the London Review of Books.
