= Luke Harding =

British journalist & writer (born 1968)

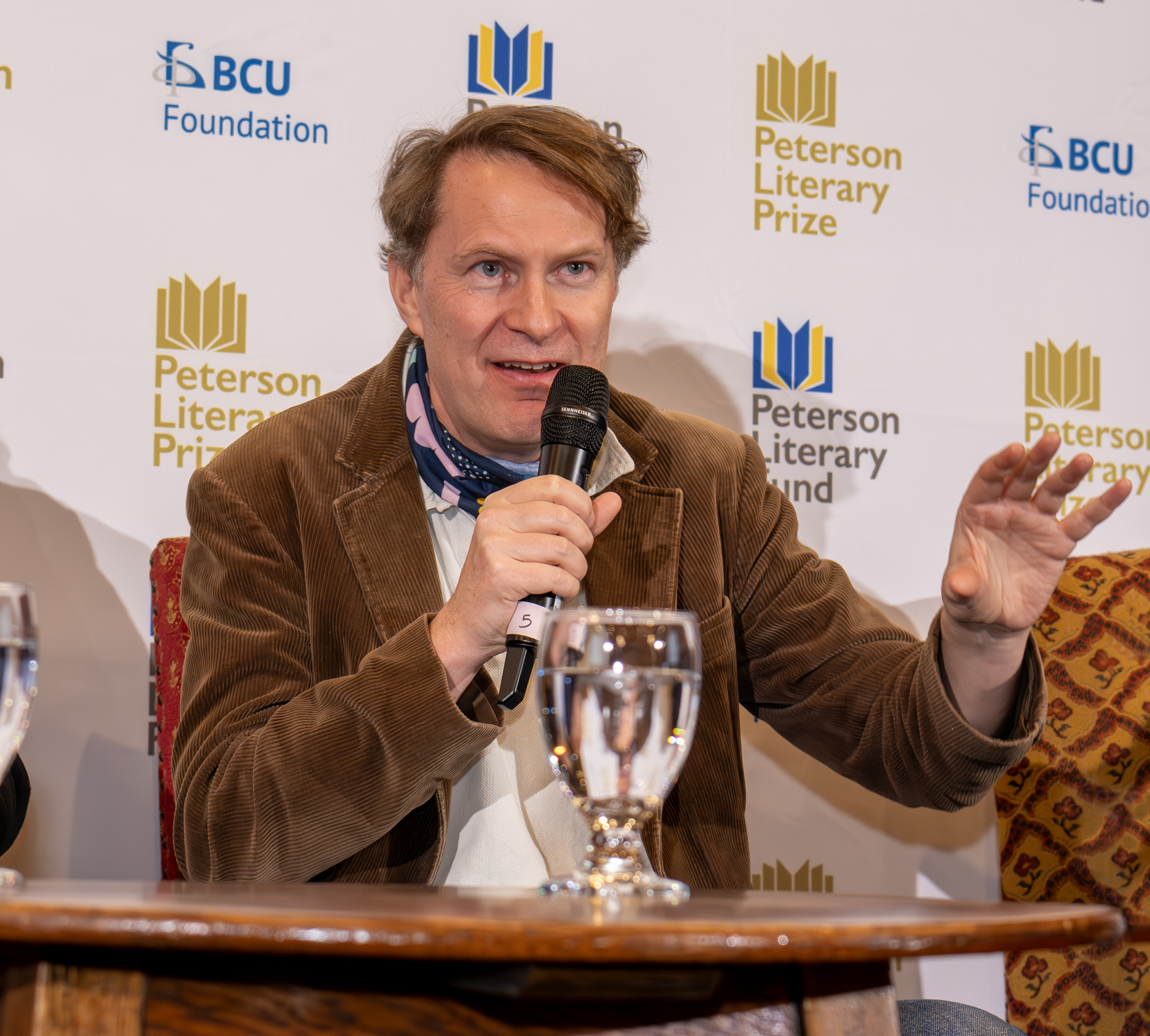
- Born: 21 April 1968 (age 58); Nottingham (United Kingdom)
- Education: University College, Oxford
- Occupations: Journalist, writer, foreign correspondent
- Employer: The Guardian (1996–)
- Notable work: Mafia State, The Snowden Files, WikiLeaks: Inside Julian Assange's War on Secrecy
- Awards: James Cameron Memorial Trust Award (2014)

Luke Daniel Harding (born 21 April 1968) is a British journalist who is a foreign correspondent for The Guardian. He is known for his coverage of Russia under Vladimir Putin, WikiLeaks and Edward Snowden.

He was based in Russia for The Guardian as their Moscow bureau chief from 2007 until, returning from a trip out of the country in 2011, he was refused re-entry to Russia and deported the same day. His 2011 book Mafia State discusses his experience in Russia and the political system under Vladimir Putin. His subsequent books include WikiLeaks: Inside Julian Assange's War on Secrecy and The Snowden Files.

== Early life and career ==
Harding was educated at the United World College of the Atlantic in South Wales, then studied English at University College, Oxford. While there he edited the student newspaper Cherwell. He worked for The Sunday Correspondent, the Evening Argus in Brighton and then the Daily Mail before joining The Guardian in 1996.

He has lived in and reported from Delhi, Berlin, and Moscow, and has covered conflicts in Afghanistan, Iraq, and Libya. In 2014 he was the recipient of the James Cameron prize for his work on Russia, Ukraine, WikiLeaks, and Edward Snowden.

In 2007, The Guardian retracted one of his articles for containing text "substantially similar to paragraphs" in another article, published earlier that year in The eXile.

== Russian expulsion ==
Harding moved to Russia as The Guardian's Moscow bureau chief in January 2007. On 5 February 2011, Harding was refused re-entry into Russia following a trip to the UK. According to Harding, this made him the first foreign journalist to be expelled from Russia since the end of the Cold War. The Guardian said his expulsion was linked with his unflattering coverage of Russia, including speculation about Vladimir Putin's wealth and Putin's knowledge of the London assassination of ex-Russian spy Alexander Litvinenko. The director of Index on Censorship, John Kampfner, said: "The Russian government's treatment of Luke Harding is petty and vindictive, and evidence – if more was needed – of the poor state of free expression in that country." Elsa Vidal, head of the European and Central Asia desk at the media freedom watchdog, was quoted in The Washington Post as saying: "This is a serious and shocking step, unprecedented since the Cold War [...] It's an attempt to force correspondents working for foreign media in Moscow to engage in self-censorship."

However, on the following day, Russian Foreign Minister Sergei Lavrov explained at a press conference that no visa cancellation had taken place and the problem had been caused by the fact that Harding's visa had expired, a statement disputed by Harding due to his visa being valid until May of that year. According to Lavrov, Harding had requested an exceptional visa extension until May which was approved. Lavrov also added that Harding had previously broken the rules of his press accreditation by visiting the area of counter-terrorism operations without informing the relevant security authorities.

The expulsion preceded a visit to Britain by Lavrov, which led to suggestions from Labour MP Chris Bryant that the British government might rescind Lavrov's invitation. On 9 February, Russia reversed the decision not to re-admit him although it only granted him a short term visa. Harding chose not to seek a further visa and returned to the UK in February.

Harding has said that during his time in Russia he was the subject of largely psychological harassment by the Federal Security Service, whom he alleges were unhappy at the stories he wrote.

== WikiLeaks ==
In 2011, the book WikiLeaks: Inside Julian Assange's War on Secrecy, written by Harding and David Leigh, was published by Vintage Books in the US and Guardian Faber in the UK. On 1 September 2011, it was revealed that an encrypted version of WikiLeaks' huge archive of un-redacted US State Department cables had been available via BitTorrent for months and that the decryption key had been published by Leigh and Harding in their book. WikiLeaks: Inside Julian Assange's War on Secrecy was made into a Hollywood film, The Fifth Estate (2013). Wikileaks said that the film was "careful to avoid most criticism of US foreign policy actually revealed by WikiLeaks" and covered "almost none of the evidence WikiLeaks published ... of serious abuses within the US military and the State Department".

== Edward Snowden ==
Harding's book on Edward Snowden, The Snowden Files (2014), was reviewed by The New York Times's Michiko Kakutani, who observed that it "reads like a le Carré novel crossed with something by Kafka. . A fast-paced, almost novelistic narrative. . .. [The book] gives readers . . a succinct overview of the momentous events of the past year. . . . Leave[s] readers with an acute understanding of the serious issues involved". Additionally, it received positive reviews from several other major publications, including The Guardian, the London Review of Books, and the Washington Post, as well as a mixed review from The Daily Telegraph's David Blair. It was adapted into a film, Snowden, directed by Oliver Stone and starring Joseph Gordon-Levitt, released in September 2016.

== Alexander Litvinenko ==
In 2016, Harding published A Very Expensive Poison, an account of the murder of the Russian ex-KGB whistle-blower and Putin critic Alexander Litvinenko. The book garnered a positive response from reviewers, including from The Spectator, The Guardian, The Times, and London Review of Books; Robert Fox, writing for the Evening Standard described it as "one of the best political thrillers [he had] come across in years". Lucy Prebble adapted the book for the stage. A production ran at The Old Vic theatre, London, from August to October 2019.

== Donald Trump and Russia ==
In November 2017, Harding published Collusion: Secret Meetings, Dirty Money, and How Russia Helped Donald Trump Win on the subject of Russian interference in the 2016 United States elections. The book examines the dossier by former British spy Christopher Steele, and alleges that Trump was the subject of at least five years of "cultivation" by Soviet/Russian intelligence services prior to his election, and possibly by the KGB as soon as 1987. In May 2021, former The New York Times reporter Barry Meier published Spooked: The Trump Dossier, Black Cube, and the Rise of Private Spies, which cited the Steele dossier as a case study in how reporters can be manipulated by private intelligence sources; Meier named Harding and MSNBC's Rachel Maddow as examples.

On 27 November 2018, Harding co-authored an anonymously sourced article for The Guardian claiming that Julian Assange and Paul Manafort met several times at the Ecuadorian embassy in 2013, 2015, and 2016 possibly in relation to the 2016 Democratic National Committee email leak. Manafort and Assange both denied that they had ever met, and Manafort said The Guardian had "proceeded with this story even after being notified by my representatives that it was false". According to Glenn Greenwald citing Tommy Vietor, "if Paul Manafort visited Assange at the Embassy, there would be ample amounts of video and other photographic proof demonstrating that this happened. The Guardian provides none of that." No other news organization was able to corroborate the story, and according to Paul Farhi of The Washington Post, "[T]he Guardian’s bombshell looks as though it could be a dud".

In 2020, Luke Harding published the book Shadow State, covering Russian covert operations, from the poisoning of Sergei Skripal by the GRU, to digital influence operations. Harding describes how, in his view, Trump has made the United States “uniquely vulnerable” to the disinformation techniques employed by the Kremlin. According to David Bond, Harding's Shadow State also "raises fresh questions about the way the UK government has handled claims of Kremlin interference in Britain’s democratic processes."

In July 2021, Harding, Julian Borger, and Dan Sabbagh announced that The Guardian had received a tranche of secret Russian documents, now known as the "Kremlin papers", allegedly leaked from the Kremlin. The document, said to have been produced on January 22, 2016, appears to authorize Putin's plan for Russian interference in the 2016 US election on behalf of "mentally unstable" Donald Trump. The document apparently confirms the existence of kompromat on Trump and matches some incidental details already known about Russian interference. According to Andrei Soldatov, the leaked material is "consistent with the procedures of the security services and the security council". Philip Bump of the Washington Post was skeptical of the document's veracity because it was "convenient for generating enthusiasm", contains predictions of destabilization that would have been difficult to make in advance, and because the 2016 document contains discussion of "how Russia might insert 'media viruses' into American public life" when these efforts had in fact been underway since at least 2014. Experts on Russian disinformation and propaganda encouraged caution.

== Russian invasion of Ukraine ==
Harding published a book about the Russian invasion of Ukraine in 2022 called Invasion, covering the first part of the conflict from February until September 2022 and based on Harding's reporting from the frontlines.

== Books ==
- The Liar: Fall of Jonathan Aitken, Penguin Books (1997), co-written with David Leigh and David Pallister.
- WikiLeaks: Inside Julian Assange's War on Secrecy, Guardian Books (2011), ISBN 978-0-85265-239-8, co-written with David Leigh.
- Mafia State: How One Reporter Became An Enemy Of The Brutal New Russia^{a}, Random House (New York, 2011), ISBN 978-0-85265-247-3.
- Libya: Murder in Benghazi and the Fall of Gaddafi (2012), co-written with Martin Chulov.
- The Snowden Files: The Inside Story of the World's Most Wanted Man, Vintage Books (New York, 2014), ISBN 978-0804173520.
- A Very Expensive Poison: the Definitive Story of the Murder of Litvinenko (2016) Guardian Faber, ISBN 978-1783350933.
- Collusion: Secret Meetings, Dirty Money, and How Russia Helped Donald Trump Win. Vintage. 2017. ISBN 978-0525562511.
- Shadow State: Murder, Mayhem and Russia's Remaking of the West. Guardian Faber. 2020. ISBN 978-1783352050.
- Invasion: The Inside Story of Russia's Bloody War and Ukraine's Fight for Survival. Vintage. 2022. ISBN 978-0593685174.
- Betrayal: Trump, Putin and the New Age of Conquest. Guardian Faber. 2026. ISBN 978-1783353378.

== Notes ==
^aPublished in the US as Expelled
