= Kremlin papers =

Alleged Russian plot to support Trump's candidacy

No 32–04 \ vd is part of a tranche of secret Russian documents, known as the Kremlin papers, that contain a plan to use "all possible force" to support Donald Trump's election in 2016 and destabilize America. They were allegedly leaked by insiders in the Kremlin.

== Description ==
The Guardian published an excerpt from the report without disclosing its source.

The report outlines a plan to put Trump into the White House in 2016 to promote Russian interests and to weaken the United States. The report also discusses the existence of kompromat on Trump, so-called compromising material, according to the document, collected from Trump's previous visits to Russia.

The papers describe Trump as an "impulsive, mentally unstable and unbalanced individual" who suffers from "an inferiority complex". The author recommended using "all possible force to facilitate his election to the post of US president". Based on the release, it is thought that Vladimir Putin approved of the operation on January 22, 2016, at a private meeting of the Russian national security council. During that meeting, a Russian spy agency determined that they would hack US targets to collect information and prepare measures toward helping Trump.

Shortly after the meeting, it is believed that Putin set up a commission to influence the 2016 US presidential election headed by Russia's defense minister Sergei Shoigu. He directed GRU military intelligence, SVR foreign intelligence, and the FSB to work toward electing Trump as president. Just a few months later, on March 19, Russian hackers sent phishing emails to Hillary Clinton's campaign chairman John Podesta, resulting in the Podesta emails release, followed weeks later by the Russian attack on the Democratic National Committee.

Describing the report's mention of kompromat on Trump, John Dobson, former British diplomat, wrote: "[T]he report confirms that the Kremlin possessed 'kompromat' on the future president, which the document claims was collected during 'certain events' that happened during Trump's trip to Moscow in November 2013."

Vladimir Putin's spokesman Dmitry Peskov dismissed the idea of Russia making Trump American president as "a great pulp fiction".
