= Daniel Domscheit-Berg =

German activist (born 1978)

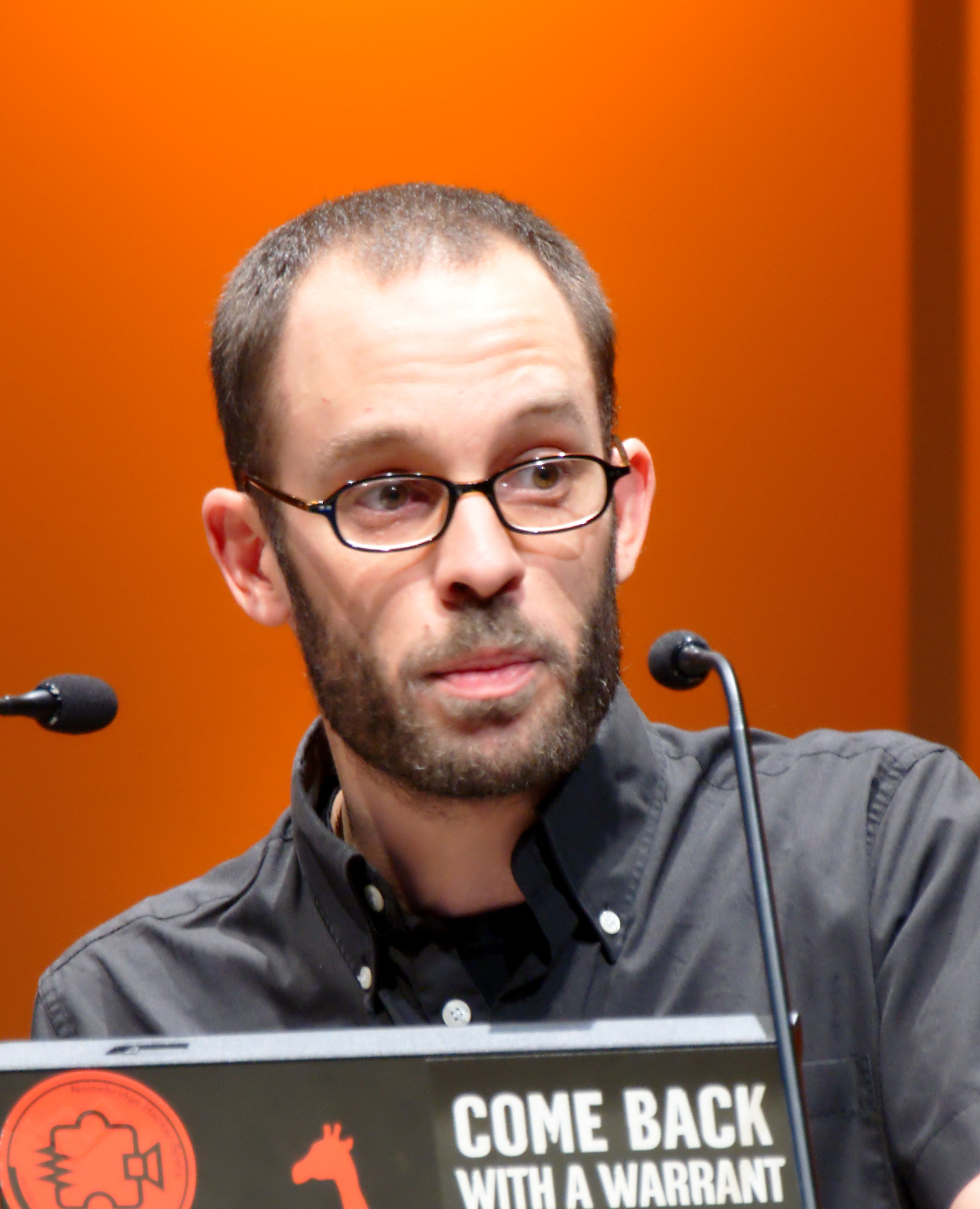
- Domscheit-Berg in 2009
- Born: 1978 (age 47–48)
- Other name: Daniel Schmitt
- Known for: Former spokesperson for WikiLeaks, founder of OpenLeaks
- Spouse: Anke Domscheit-Berg

Daniel Domscheit-Berg (German: [ˈdaːni̯eːl ˌdɔmʃaɪtˈbɛʁk, -ni̯ɛl -]; né Berg; born 1978), previously known under the pseudonym Daniel Schmitt, is a German technology activist. He is best known as the former spokesperson for WikiLeaks and the author of Inside WikiLeaks: My Time with Julian Assange at the World's Most Dangerous Website (2011).

Domscheit-Berg began working with WikiLeaks after meeting Assange at the Chaos Computer Club's annual conference in 2007. In August 2010, Domscheit-Berg was suspended from WikiLeaks by Assange after Domscheit-Berg challenged Assange's effectiveness as a leader. In September 2010, Domscheit-Berg resigned from WikiLeaks, saying "WikiLeaks has a structural problem. I no longer want to take responsibility for it, and that's why I am leaving the project."

Upon leaving WikiLeaks, Domscheit-Berg allegedly destroyed thousands of unpublished documents.

On 17 December 2010, he announced plans to open a new website for anonymous online leaks called OpenLeaks. At a Chaos Computer Club (CCC) event in August 2011, he announced its preliminary launch and invited hackers to test the security of the OpenLeaks system. The launch was a failure as it was unable to get online. The CCC criticized Domscheit-Berg for exploiting the good name of the club to promote his OpenLeaks project and expelled him from the club. This decision was revoked in February 2012. In September 2011, several news organizations cited Domscheit-Berg's split from Julian Assange and WikiLeaks as one of a series of events that led to the release that month of all 251,287 United States diplomatic cables in the Cablegate affair.

In 2011, he was named by Foreign Policy magazine in its FP Top 100 Global Thinkers.

== WikiLeaks ==
Domscheit-Berg began working with WikiLeaks after meeting Assange at the Chaos Computer Club's annual conference (24C3) in 2007. During an online chat in August 2010, Julian Assange accused Domscheit-Berg of leaking information about the organization to Newsweek magazine. Assange suspended Domscheit-Berg from WikiLeaks during the chat after Domscheit-Berg wrote "you're not even fulfilling your role as a leader right now. A leader communicates and cultivates trust in himself. You are doing the exact opposite. You behave like some kind of emperor or slave trader."

On 25 September 2010 Domscheit-Berg told Der Spiegel that he was resigning, saying "WikiLeaks has a structural problem. I no longer want to take responsibility for it, and that's why I am leaving the project." When Domscheit-Berg resigned, the architect of WikiLeaks' submission platform and four other staffers also broke with Assange.

A book about his experience with and separation from WikiLeaks was released in Germany in February 2011, entitled Inside WikiLeaks: Meine Zeit bei der gefährlichsten Website der Welt ("My Time at the World's Most Dangerous Website"). An English translation was later released by Australian publisher Scribe Publications. In Berg's book he criticizes Julian Assange's leadership style and handling of the Afghan War Diaries. Domscheit-Berg stated he would destroy WikiLeaks data when leaving WikiLeaks. He and the other staffers leaving the project wanted to be sure that duplicates would be confirmed deleted by a notary with an affidavit. After leaving, WikiLeaks stated that Domscheit-Berg representing OpenLeaks, negotiated for eleven months over the unpublished documents and internal organisation communications with mediation between OpenLeaks and WikiLeaks conducted and terminated by organization spokesman and board member Andy Müller-Maguhn. Domscheit-Berg told weekly Der Freitag that "I took no documents from WikiLeaks with me", leading to suspension of mediations. Domscheit-Berg was eventually kicked out of Chaos Computer Club by Müller-Maguhn due to tension over the files and for using the name of the Chaos Computer Club to promote OpenLeaks.

WikiLeaks and other sources later alleged that Domscheit-Berg had destroyed over 3500 unpublished whistleblower communications with some communications containing hundreds of documents, including the US government's No Fly List, 5 GB of Bank of America leaks, insider information from 20 neo-Nazi organizations, Combat Camera footage of the Granai Airstrike, and evidence of torture and government abuse of a Latin American country. Domscheit-Berg confirmed that he had destroyed the unpublished files including the No Fly list. He said that WikiLeaks' claims about the Bank of America files were "false and misleading" and that he hadn't taken them. According to Domscheit-Berg, the files were lost because of an IT problem when one of WikiLeaks storage drives crashed and they lost it.

== OpenLeaks ==
On 17 December 2010, Domscheit-Berg announced the intention to start a site named "OpenLeaks" with the intention of being more transparent than WikiLeaks. "In these last months, the WikiLeaks organization has not been open any more. It lost its open-source promise." Several other members of WikiLeaks left with Domscheit-Berg to join OpenLeaks, including a programmer known only as "The Architect" who had designed the WikiLeaks submission system. OpenLeaks planned to launch a whistleblowing foundation in Germany and that would make decisions about how to operate.

Instead of publishing the documents, Domscheit-Berg said that his proposed OpenLeaks process would send the leaked documents to various news entities or publishers without publishing them directly. According to Domscheit-Berg, OpenLeaks wouldn't be able to read submissions. They would give the submissions to outlets chosen by the source, and then give others access after a certain amount of time or if the outlet refused the submission. Insiders at OpenLeaks said that because of that, they planned to avoid "the kind of political pressure which WikiLeaks is under at this time." Internal documents said it wanted to be a neutral intermediary "without a political agenda except from the dissemination of information to the media, the public, non-profit organizations, trade- and union organizations and other participating groups." Analysts said OpenLeaks was a promising alternative to WikiLeaks and Lucy Dalglish, executive director of the Reporters Committee for Freedom of the Press, OpenLeaks structure would make it more of an internet service provider than a publisher.

OpenLeaks aimed to start public operations in January 2011 but postponed its launch more than once. In August 2011, Domscheit-Berg announced a four day test launch and invited thousands of hackers to attack the OpenLeaks site and look for security flaws during the Chaos Communications Camp. At the event, WikiLeaks associate Jacob Appelbaum brought up rumors that OpenLeaks was connected to German intelligence. Chaos Communication Camp board member, Andy Müller-Maguhn, said OpenLeaks did not provide source protection and lacked transparency. When OpenLeaks attempted to launch a test site at the event, it was unable to get online. At the time, four European newspapers and one non-profit group had signed up to receive the OpenLeaks documents.

In September 2011, activist American author and security state critic Glenn Greenwald wrote that OpenLeaks had not produced any disclosures and was "cashing in on a vindictive, petty, personality-based vendetta against Assange and WikiLeaks ... and ... bolstering secrecy and destroying transparency, as Domscheit-Berg did when he permanently deleted thousands of files previously leaked to WikiLeaks, including documents relating to the Bank of America".

On 23 December 2012 Domscheit-Berg announced on the website that the organisation would not go ahead as previously intended and would now focus on providing technology and expertise regarding how to receive documents from anonymous sources rather than directly facilitating leaks themselves.

In a July 2013 interview, Domscheit-Berg said that work on OpenLeaks would continue, but "without much public involvement."

== Personal life ==
Domscheit-Berg is married to activist and politician Anke Domscheit-Berg.

== Makerspace in a disused rail station building ==
As of 2020, Domscheit-Berg is engaged with the makerspace Verstehbahnhof (translated: Station of Understanding). The makerspace has re-appropriated rooms of the Fürstenberg (Havel) station, which is still in use.

== Inside WikiLeaks ==
- Daniel Domscheit-Berg (2011). Inside WikiLeaks: Meine Zeit bei der gefährlichsten Website der Welt (in German). Berlin: Econ Verlag. ISBN 978-3-430-20121-6.
- Daniel Domscheit-Berg (2011). Inside WikiLeaks: my time with Julian Assange at the world's most dangerous website. Carlton North, City of Melbourne: Scribe Publications. ISBN 978-1-921844-05-8. Archived from the original on 19 February 2011.
- Daniel Domscheit-Berg (2011). Inside WikiLeaks: My Time with Julian Assange at the World's Most Dangerous Website. New York City: Random House. ISBN 978-0-307-95191-5.
