= David Blair (journalist) =

British journalist (born 1973)

David Blair CBE
- Born: David Joseph Blair; 1973 (age 52–53); Malawi
- Education: St Benet's Hall, Oxford; Corpus Christi College, Cambridge University (M.Phil)
- Occupation: Journalist

David Joseph Blair CBE (born 1973 in Malawi to British parents) is a British journalist, who is currently Chief Foreign Affairs Commentator at The Daily Telegraph. He previously worked for the Financial Times as Energy Correspondent, and The Daily Telegraph as a Foreign Correspondent and then Diplomatic Editor.

He was appointed Commander of the Order of the British Empire (CBE) in the 2022 Prime Minister's Resignation Honours for public service.

== Early life and education ==
David Blair graduated from St Benet's Hall, Oxford, with a First-Class degree in PPE. He was President of the Oxford University Conservative Association in 1993. He later attended Corpus Christi College, Cambridge University, taking a M.Phil. in International Relations. In 1994, Blair represented Oxford at the grand final of the World Universities Debating Championship with Rufus Black.

Although born in Malawi, Blair is a British citizen. He is not related to the former British prime minister, Tony Blair.

== Career in journalism ==
Blair began working for The Daily Telegraph in Zimbabwe in 1999. He was forced to leave the country by President Robert Mugabe's regime in June 2001. Blair later published a book about his experiences, Degrees in Violence: Robert Mugabe and the Struggle for Power in Zimbabwe. He was named Young Journalist of the Year in 2001 by the Foreign Press Association for his coverage of Zimbabwe.

Thereafter, he was based in Pakistan (2002–2003) and the Middle East (2003–2004). He was among the first journalists to enter Jenin Refugee Camp in the West Bank after the controversial Israeli assault in April 2002. Blair's front-page report on the Palestinian suffering caused by this attack, headlined "Blasted to Rubble by the Israelis", attracted considerable attention as The Daily Telegraph had always been perceived as favourable to Israel.

Blair reported extensively from Iraq before and after the American-led 2003 invasion of Iraq. At the height of the looting in Baghdad in April 2003, Blair entered Saddam Hussein's old foreign ministry and found documents purporting to show that George Galloway, then a member of parliament, had received money from the deposed regime. Galloway vigorously denied this charge and sued The Daily Telegraph for libel on the totality of the Telegraph reports, which included those by other journalists and editorials. Galloway won the case in November 2004 and the newspaper paid him damages of £150,000 plus, after a failed appeal, legal costs of about £2 million. The Daily Telegraph did not attempt to claim justification (where the defendant seeks to prove the truth of the defamatory reports): "It has never been the Telegraph's case to suggest that the allegations contained in these documents are true". Instead, the paper sought to argue that it acted responsibly because the allegations it reported were of sufficient public interest to outweigh the damage caused to Galloway's reputation. However, the trial judge did not accept this defence saying the suggestion that Galloway was guilty of "treason", "in Saddam's pay", and being "Saddam's little helper" caused him to conclude "the newspaper was not neutral but both embraced the allegations with relish and fervour and went on to embellish them".

Blair became The Daily Telegraph's Africa Bureau Chief in June 2004. He reported on the war in Darfur, the elections in the Democratic Republic of the Congo and the war in northern Uganda. He left this job some time in late 2006.

In 2009, Blair left his Telegraph diplomatic editor post to join the Financial Times as Middle East and Africa news editor. In 2010 he was appointed the Financial Times energy correspondent.

In November 2011, Blair returned to The Daily Telegraph as chief foreign correspondent.
