= WikiLeaks: Inside Julian Assange's War on Secrecy =

Book by David Leigh and Luke Harding

- Author: David Leigh; Luke Harding
- Language: English
- Subject: WikiLeaks
- Publisher: Guardian Books
- Publication date: 1 February 2011
- Media type: Paperback
- Pages: 352 pages
- ISBN: 978-0-85265-239-8

WikiLeaks: Inside Julian Assange's War on Secrecy is a 2011 book by British journalists David Leigh and Luke Harding. It is an account of Julian Assange, WikiLeaks, and the leak by Chelsea Manning of classified material to the website in 2010. It was published by Guardian Books in February 2011.

Along with other sources, portions were adapted for the 2013 film The Fifth Estate.

== Content ==
The book describes Assange's childhood and details about his work creating and expanding WikiLeaks. It explains how his surname comes from his stepfather, a "touring puppet theater owner", and not his biological father, a choice that Assange made himself.

== Publication of the password ==
Wikileaks gave The Guardian a copy of the unredacted leaks which included the names of informants and other sensitive information that was not intended for publication. This very sensitive information was protected by a large passphrase to ensure its secrecy.

However, Leigh's book then published this password which led directly to the unredacted data being publicly available. It has been claimed that this led directly to the deaths of some of those informants.

Assange wrote down on a scrap of paper:
ACollectionOfHistorySince_1966_ToThe_PresentDay#. "That's the password," he said. "But you have to add one extra word when you type it in. You have to put in the word 'Diplomatic' before the word 'History'. Can you remember that?"

— David Leigh, WikiLeaks: Inside Julian Assange's War on Secrecy

In response The Guardian said "It's nonsense to suggest the Guardian's WikiLeaks book has compromised security in any way." According to The Guardian, WikiLeaks had indicated that the password was temporary and that WikiLeaks had seven months to take action to protect the files it had subsequently decided to post online. The Guardian has not described what actions WikiLeaks could have taken given that the encrypted files had been leaked.

Wikileaks did eventually publish the unredacted version. The Guardian article about this failed to mention that the publication was after the password became widely known and was published so that informants could see what had been leaked and take action to protect themselves if necessary.

== Controversies as to content ==
In response to the book's publication, WikiLeaks posted on Twitter: "The Guardian book serialization contains malicious libels. We will be taking action." The Hindu writer, Hasan Suroor, said Assange's concern is that the book is "critical of [Assange's] robust style and his alleged tendency to be a 'control freak'".

One of the points of disagreement is that the book claimed Assange had initially refused to redact the names of Afghan informants to the US military from the Afghan War logs. The book quotes Declan Walsh who was at a dinner with Assange attended by David Leigh and two other journalists on Assange's response about informants.

'Well, they're informants,' he said. 'So, if they get killed, they've got it coming to them. They deserve it.' There was, for a moment, silence around the table. I think everyone was struck by what a callous thing that was to say.

In an affidavit provided to OFCAM in relation to the Channel 4 broadcast WikiLeaks: Secrets and Lies, John Goetz of Der Spiegel, who was also at the dinner, stated that Assange had not made such a statement and that he had informed the producers of the Channel 4 program of that at the time. Channel 4 disputed this, saying "The producer of the programme confirmed to them that Mr Goetz did not tell him that Mr Assange did not make the statement “they’re informants they deserve to die” and nor did he say words to that effect", adding "It would be difficult for Mr Goetz to state categorically that Mr Assange did not say these words, particularly when taking into account that the restaurant (Moro) was busy and noisy and the dinner did not take place in a private room."
