= David Leigh (journalist) =

British journalist and writer (born 1946)

- Education: Nottingham High School, King's College, Cambridge
- Occupations: Investigative journalist, assistant editor
- Years active: 1970 – present
- Title: The Guardian's former Investigations editor

David Leigh is a British journalist and writer who was the investigations editor of The Guardian and is the author of Investigative Journalism: a survival guide. He officially retired in April 2013, although Leigh continued his association with the newspaper.

In 1977 Leigh exposed to the public the existence of the Information Research Department (IRD), a secret British government propaganda department and one of the largest covert anti-communist propaganda organisations in history. This expose led to further discoveries including the existence of Orwell's list, smear attacks against British trade unionists, and British propaganda operations in Korea, India, Malaya, Indonesia, Cyprus and Ireland.

== Career ==
Educated at Nottingham High School and King's College, Cambridge, leaving with a postgraduate degree in 1969. He is an investigative journalist who received the first of several British Press Awards in 1979 for an exposure of jury-vetting. He was a journalist for the Scotsman, The Times, and The Guardian, and a Laurence Stern fellow at the Washington Post in 1980. Between 1989 and 1996, he also worked as a reporter for Thames TV's current affairs series This Week, and a producer/director for Granada TV's investigative series World in Action.

From 1980 to 1989, he was chief investigative reporter at The Observer. His book The Wilson Plot (1988) increased public interest in alleged attempts by the British security services and others to destabilise Harold Wilson's government in the 1970s. His 1995 TV documentary for World in Action, "Jonathan of Arabia", led after a libel trial to the jailing for perjury of former Conservative defence minister Jonathan Aitken.

With his colleague Rob Evans, Leigh published a series of corruption exposures in The Guardian about international arms giant BAE Systems. After a criminal inquiry by the US Department of Justice and other international prosecutors, the company was eventually required to pay penalties totalling $529 million. In 2006, Leigh became the Anthony Sampson Professor of Reporting in the Journalism department at City University London. His wife's sister married Alan Rusbridger, who later became editor of The Guardian.

=== WikiLeaks ===
In 2010 Leigh was a member of the team which handled the release of United States diplomatic and military documents which had been passed to WikiLeaks, and which worked closely with Julian Assange. The relationship soured after Assange said The Guardian “selectively publish[ed]” parts of the Swedish police report on the sex charges against Assange by two Swedish women. Assange said “The leak was clearly designed to undermine my bail application”. In response Leigh tweeted: "The #guardian published too many leaks for #Assange's liking, it seems. So now he's signed up 'exclusively' with #Murdoch's Times. Gosh."

In 2011, Leigh co-wrote a book with Luke Harding called WikiLeaks: Inside Julian Assange's War on Secrecy, which was published by the Guardian. The book published a password that was later involved in the release of unredacted US embassy cables. The book would go on to be made into the 2014 movie, The Fifth Estate.

In 2011, after Private Eye magazine criticised an allegedly antisemitic Wikileaks associate Israel Shamir, editor Ian Hislop reported that Assange telephoned and complained of a campaign led by The Guardian to smear Wikileaks and deprive it of Jewish donations. Three people involved, including Leigh, according to Assange, were Jewish. Hislop says he pointed out that at least one of the three was not in fact Jewish and that this "Jewish conspiracy" was unconvincing. Assange eventually backed down and told Hislop to, "Forget the Jewish thing." In response, Assange said: "Hislop has distorted, invented or misremembered almost every significant claim and phrase."

In a further spat in 2012, Assange referred in a press release to: "an information mule in the Israeli newspaper Haaretz, Yossi Melman, who conspired with Guardian journalist David Leigh to secretly, and in violation of WikiLeaks' contract with the Guardian, move WikiLeaks' U.S. diplomatic cables to Israel." Melman characterised this as a "clumsy smear" attempt.

== Awards ==
In 1979, Leigh won a British Press Awards special award for exposing jury-vetting, while a reporter at The Guardian. In 1985, he won Investigative Reporter of the Year in the Granada TV What the Papers Say awards, for exposing MI5 vetting of BBC staff. In 2007, he won the Paul Foot Award, with his colleague Rob Evans, for the BAE bribery exposures. The prize was awarded annually by Private Eye and The Guardian in memory of the campaigning journalist Paul Foot. Leigh and Evans were also presented with the Granada TV What the Papers Say Judges' Award for "an outstanding piece of investigative journalism that uncovered a story of great significance". In 2010, the International Consortium of Investigative Journalists gave Leigh and five other journalists the Daniel Pearl Award for their investigation of toxic waste dumping by oil traders Trafigura. In 2015, he and a Guardian team he led won Investigation of the Year at the British Journalism Awards for their exposure of tax-dodging at HSBC's Swiss bank.

In February 2013, the Press Gazette named Leigh as third in their list of the top 10 investigative journalists.

== Portrayals ==
He is played by Lee Ingleby in the 2025 ITV drama about the News International phone hacking scandal, The Hack.

== Bibliography ==
- David Leigh, The Frontiers of Secrecy: Closed Government in Britain, Praeger (30 June 1980), ISBN 978-0-313-27093-2
- David Leigh, High Time: The Life and Times of Howard Marks, William Heineman Ltd (8 October 1984), ISBN 978-0-434-41339-3; HarperCollins (1988), ISBN 978-0-04-364023-4
- David Leigh, The Wilson Plot: The Intelligence Services and the Discrediting of a Prime Minister, Pantheon Books (1988), ISBN 978-0-394-57241-3; Arrow Books (1 June 1989), ISBN 978-0-7493-0067-8
- David Leigh, Betrayed: Trial of Matrix Churchill, Bloomsbury Publishing PLC (4 February 1993), ISBN 978-0-7475-1552-4
- David Leigh, Luke Harding and David Pallister, The Liar: Fall of Jonathan Aitken, Penguin Books (1997)
- David Leigh and Ed Vulliamy, Sleaze: The Corruption of Parliament, Fourth Estate (17 March 1997), ISBN 978-1-85702-694-8
- David Leigh and Luke Harding, WikiLeaks: Inside Julian Assange's War on Secrecy, Guardian Books (1 February 2011), ISBN 978-0-85265-239-8
- David Leigh, Investigative Journalism: a survival guide, Palgrave Macmillan (9 September 2019), ISBN 978-3-030-16751-6
