= Kurgan Oblast =

First-level administrative division of Russia

Kurgan Oblast Курганская область (Russian)
- Oblast
- Flag Coat of arms

- Coordinates: 55°34′N 64°45′E
- Country: Russia
- Federal district: Ural
- Economic region: Ural
- Established: February 6, 1943
- Administrative center: Kurgan

Government
  - Body: Oblast Duma
  - Governor: Vadim Shumkov

Area
  - Total: 71,488 km^{2} (27,602 sq mi)
  - Rank: 43rd

Population (2021 census)
  - Total: 776,661
  - Estimate (2018): 845,537
  - Rank: 59th
  - Density: 10.864/km^{2} (28.138/sq mi)
  - Urban: 63.9%
  - Rural: 36.1%

GDP (nominal, 2024)
  - Total: ₽380 billion (US$4.46 billion)
  - Per capita: ₽502,403 (US$5,895.3)
- Time zone: UTC+5 (MSK+2)
- ISO 3166 code: RU-KGN
- License plates: 45
- OKTMO ID: 37000000
- Official languages: Russian
- Website: http://www.kurganobl.ru/

Kurgan Oblast (Note: Russian: Курга́нская о́бласть, romanized: Kurganskaya oblastʹ) is a federal subject of Russia (an oblast). Its administrative center is the city of Kurgan. According to the 2021 Census, the population was 776,661, down from 910,807 recorded in the 2010 Census.

== History ==
Formed by Decree of the Presidium of the Supreme Soviet of the USSR of February 6, 1943. The region included 32 districts of the eastern part of the Chelyabinsk region and 4 districts of the Omsk region with a total population of 975,000.

Recipient of the Order of Lenin (1959).

== Geography ==
Kurgan Oblast is located in Southern Russia and is part of the Urals Federal District. It shares borders with Chelyabinsk Oblast to the west, Sverdlovsk Oblast to the north-west, Tyumen Oblast to the north-east, and Kazakhstan (Kostanay and North Kazakhstan Region) to the south. Lakes Medvezhye and Filatovo are located in the district.

=== Climate ===
The oblast has a severe continental climate with long cold winters and warm summers with regular droughts. The average January temperature is −18 °C (0 °F), and the average temperature in the warmest month (July) is +19 °C (66 °F). Annual precipitation is about 400 millimeters (16 in).

== Politics ==
During the Soviet period, the high authority in the oblast was shared between three persons: The first secretary of the Kurgan CPSU Committee (who in reality had the biggest authority), the chairman of the oblast Soviet (legislative power), and the Chairman of the oblast Executive Committee (executive power). Since 1991, CPSU lost all the power, and the head of the Oblast administration, and eventually the governor was appointed/elected alongside elected regional parliament.

The Charter of Kurgan Oblast is the fundamental law of the region. The Kurgan Oblast Duma is the province's standing legislative (representative) body. The Oblast Duma consists of 34 members and exercises its authority by passing laws, resolutions, and other legal acts and by supervising the implementation and observance of the laws and other legal acts passed by it. The highest executive body is the Oblast Government, which includes territorial executive bodies such as district administrations, committees, and commissions that facilitate development and run the day to day matters of the province. The Oblast administration supports the activities of the Governor who is the highest official and acts as guarantor of the observance of the oblast Charter in accordance with the Constitution of Russia.

After the last elections held in 2026 the United Russia Party currently holds the majority of seats in the Oblast Duma.

== Economy ==
Kurgan Oblast borders on the oil- and gas-bearing districts of Tyumen Oblast and is also close to similar districts in Tomsk Oblast. Large oil and gas pipelines pass through its territory, and Ural and Siberian oil refineries are fairly close. The main industrial centers are Kurgan, and Shadrinsk.

The oblast does not have large economic mineral reserves; therefore, it has developed mainly on the basis of subindustries associated with processing of agricultural production and assembly and packaging of finished products. The food industry is well developed here, with meat-packing plants, mills, creameries, and powdered milk factories.

Modern large-scale industry began developing during World War II, when sixteen enterprises from western regions of the country were evacuated here in 1941–1942.

== Demographics ==
Historical population
Year	Pop.	±%
1959	999,170	—
1970	1,085,560	+8.6%
1979	1,080,274	−0.5%
1989	1,104,872	+2.3%
2002	1,019,532	−7.7%
2010	910,807	−10.7%
2021	776,661	−14.7%
2025	744,197	−4.2%
Source: Census data, estimate

Population: 776,661 (2021 census); 910,807 (2010 census); 1,019,532 (2002 census); 1,104,872 (1989 Soviet census).

Russians (823,722) are the largest ethnic group in the Kurgan Oblast, making up 92.5% of the population. Other prominent ethnic groups in the oblast include Tatars (17,017) at 1.9%, Bashkirs (12,257) at 1.4%, Kazakhs (11,939) 1.3%, and Ukrainians (7,080) at 0.8%. Other ethnicities are 2.1%. Additionally, 20,017 people were registered from administrative databases, and could not declare an ethnicity. It is estimated that the proportion of ethnicities in this group is the same as that of the declared group.

Vital statistics for 2024:

- Births: 5,508 (7.4 per 1,000)
- Deaths: 12,871 (17.2 per 1,000)

Total fertility rate (2024):
1.55 children per woman

Life expectancy (2021):
Total — 68.29 years (male — 63.29, female — 73.48)

=== Settlements ===
Largest cities or towns in Kurgan Oblast 2010 Russian Census
Rank		Administrative Division	Pop.
1	Kurgan	City of oblast significance of Kurgan	333,606
2	Shadrinsk	Shadrinsky District	77,756
3	Shumikha	Shumikhinsky District	17,819
4	Kurtamysh	Kurtamyshsky District	17,099
5	Kataysk	Kataysky District	14,003
6	Dalmatovo	Dalmatovsky District	13,911
7	Petukhovo	Petukhovsky District	11,292
8	Shchuchye	Shchuchansky District	10,973
9	Vargashi	Vargashinsky District	9,254
10	Kargapolye	Kargapolsky District	8,433

=== Religion ===
Religion in Kurgan Oblast as of 2012 (Sreda Arena Atlas)
Russian Orthodoxy	28.4%
Other Orthodox	0.6%
Other Christians	5.9%
Islam	2.6%
Rodnovery and other native faiths	1.4%
Spiritual but not religious	36.1%
Atheism and irreligion	14.4%
Other and undeclared	10.6%

According to a 2012 survey 28.4% of the population of Kurgan Oblast adheres to the Russian Orthodox Church, 6% are nondenominational Christians (with the exclusion of such-defined Protestant churches), 2% are adherents of Islam, 1% are adherents of the Slavic native faith (Rodnovery), and 0.4% are adherents of forms of Hinduism (Vedism, Krishnaism or Tantrism). In addition, 36% of the population declares to be "spiritual but not religious", 14% is atheist, and 12.2% follows other religions or did not give an answer to the question.

== Notable people ==
- Yuri Balashov (born March 12, 1949), chess grandmaster
- Oleg Bogomolov (born October 4, 1950), former Governor of Kurgan Oblast
- Fyodor Bronnikov (1827–1902), painter
- Dmitri Bushmanov (born September 30, 1978), association football player
- Aleksandr Cherepanov (November 21, 1895 – July 6, 1984), lieutenant-general
- Dumitru Diacov (born February 10, 1952), Moldovan politician
- Viktor Dubynin (February 1, 1943 – November 22, 1992), Army General
- Maxim Fadeev (born May 6, 1968), singer-songwriter, composer and producer
- Pavel Fitin (December 28, 1907 – December 24, 1971), director of Soviet intelligence
- Filipp Golikov (July 30, 1900 – July 29, 1980), Marshal of the Soviet Union
- Sergey Gritsevets (July 19, 1909 – September 16, 1939), major, pilot and twice recipient of the honorary title of Hero of the Soviet Union.
- Gavriil Ilizarov (June 15, 1921 – July 24, 1992), physician
- Vyacheslav Kamoltsev (born December 14, 1971), association football player
- Svetlana Kapanina (born December 22, 1968), aerobatic pilot
- Anatoly Karelin (July 16, 1922 – January 3, 1974), Major General of aviation
- Leonid Khabarov (born May 8, 1947), Colonel
- Larisa Korobeynikova (born March 26, 1987), fencer
- Evgeni Krasilnikov (born April 7, 1965), volleyball player
- Leonid Krasin (July 3 (15), 1870 – November 24, 1926), politician and diplomat
- Ivan Kurpishev (born March 2, 1969), powerlifter
- Dmitri Loskov (born February 12, 1974), association football player
- Aleksey Merzlyakov (March 22, 1778 - August 7, 1830), poet, critic, translator, and professor
- Yana Romanova (born May 11, 1983), biathlete
- Sergei Rublevsky (born October 15, 1974), chess grandmaster
- Mikhail Ryumin (September 1, 1913 – July 22, 1954), Deputy Head of the Ministry for State Security (Soviet Union)
- Yulia Savicheva (born 14 February 1987), singer
- Ivan Shadr (February 11, 1887 – April 3, 1941), sculptor and medalist
- Alexander Solonik (October 16, 1960 – January 31, 1997), hitman
- Elena Temnikova (born April 18, 1985), singer
- Alla Vazhenina (born May 29, 1983), weightlifter
- Aleksandr Vinogradov (September 9, 1930 – June 14, 2011), journalist and writer
- Sergei Vinogradov (April 16, 1958 – December 16, 2010), journalist, translator and writer
- Kirill A. Yevstigneyev (February 17, 1917 – August 29, 1996), Major General of aviation
