= Kurgan State Pedagogical Institute =

- Курганский государственный педагогический институт
- Active: 1952–1995
- Location: Kurgan, Russia
- Language: Russian

Kurgan State Pedagogical Institute (Russian: Курганский государственный педагогический институт) is a higher education institution founded in 1952 to train teachers. It was reorganized in 1995 and Kurgan State University was established on its basis.

== History ==
On 30 May 1951, by decree of the Council of Ministers of the USSR No. 8472, by order of the Ministry of Higher and Secondary Specialized Education of the USSR No. 962 and by order of the Ministry of Education of the RSFSR No. 424 in the city of Kurgan, on the basis of the Shadrinsk Pedagogical Institute, the Kurgan State Pedagogical Institute was established. The educational buildings of the institute were located on Sovetskaya Street at 63. A. A. Kondrashenkov was appointed the first rector.

On 17 June 1952, on the basis of the order of the Minister of Education of the RSFSR, the educational process was started at the institute. Initially, the structure of the institute consisted of three faculties: physics and mathematics, history and philology and foreign languages. The main backbone of the scientific and pedagogical staff were former teachers of the Shadrinsk Pedagogical Institute, at the time of the founding of the Kurgan Pedagogical Institute, it consisted of twenty-two teachers. In 1958, a new specialty of a secondary school teacher in physical education, anatomy and physiology was opened at the institute. In 1962, a new Faculty of Biology and Chemistry was opened at the institute, and departments appeared in the structure of the institute: general history, history of the USSR, foreign languages, Russian language and Russian and foreign literature. In 1977, the Faculty of History and Philology was established. In 1968, A. D. Sazonov was appointed rector of the institute.

Since 1966, the Institute operated the Archaeological Laboratory under the leadership of T. M. Potemkina, whose employees conducted constant archaeological expeditions until 1975. As a result of these studies, a large number of new monuments, settlements and burial grounds of various eras were discovered: rivers: Alabuga, Kurtamysh, Miass, Sueri, Tobol and Chernaya. Certification of 470 archaeological sites of the Kurgan region was carried out, among them Savin-1. From 1952 to 1985, the research work of the institute was carried out in the following areas: pedagogical foundations for teaching and educating schoolchildren and students of pedagogical universities, issues of local history, issues of industrial and agricultural production, theoretical foundations of science. In 1985, one hundred and eighty-eight teachers participated in the research work of the institute, of which they had the academic title of associate professors and professors and about a hundred candidates and doctors of science.

From 1980 to 1995, the structure of the Institute included: Faculty of Physics and Mathematics, Faculty of Biology and Chemistry, Faculty of Natural Geography, Faculty of Foreign Languages, Faculty of History and Philology, Faculty of Primary Education, Faculty of Psychology and the Departments of General Linguistics, History of the USSR (Russian history and documentation), general history, Russian language, algebra, geometry, information technology, Russian and foreign literature, French, English and German philology, foreign languages, history of literature and folklore. In 1995, A.P. Kuznetsov was appointed the last rector of the institute. Over the years of its existence, the institute has trained more than twelve thousand teachers for secondary schools in various specializations.

On September 30, 1995, by Decree of the President of the Russian Federation No. 990, Kurgan State University was established on the basis of the Kurgan Pedagogical Institute and the Kurgan Machine-Building Institute.

== Management ==
- Kondrashenkov, Alexey Alekseevich (1955-1968)
- Sazonov, Alexander Dmitrievich (1968-1995)
- Kuznetsov, Alexander Pavlovich (1995-1998)

== Notable faculty and alumni ==
- Astapov, Pavel Leonidovich - medalist of the Russian Sambo Championship, champion and medalist of the Asian Sambo Championships, International Master of Sports of Russia in Sambo, Master of Sports of Russia in judo.
- Goldinov, Vyacheslav Anatolyevich - Honored Worker of Physical Culture of the Russian Federation and Honored Coach of Russia.
- Zabolotnaya, Lyudmila Fedorovna - champion and silver medalist of the World Championship, multiple champion and medalist of the USSR championships. Master of Sports of the USSR of international class.
- Kislitsyn, Vasily Alexandrovich - Deputy of the State Duma of the Federal Assembly of the Russian Federation of the III convocation.
- Sergey Kolesnikov - winner of the Russian championships in judo, champion and medalist of the Russian championships in sambo, European champion and medalist of the world championships in sambo, Master of Sports of the USSR of international class in sambo and judo, Honored Master of Sports of Russia in sambo.
- Kuntarev, Sergey Aleksandrovich - bronze medalist of the European Championship, champion of Russia and World Cup Winner.
- Ivan Kurpishev - twice silver medalist of the Russian Championship.
- Aleksandr Menshchikov - world champion in Greco-Roman wrestling, Honored Master of Sports of Russia, Honored Coach of Russia.
- Ogarkova, Lyudmila Dmitrievna - Champion of the USSR, Master of Sports of the USSR. Biathlon coach of the highest category.
- Shalyutin, Solomon Mikhailovich - Doctor of Philosophical Sciences. Honored Worker of Culture of the RSFSR.

== Literature ==
- История культуры Южного Зауралья / Подливалов В. В. и др.; М-во образования Российской Федерации, Федеральное агентство по образованию, Курганский гос. ун-т. - Курган : Изд-во Курганского гос. ун-та, Т. 2: Развитие системы высшего и среднего специального образования в 1965—1989 гг. — 2005. — 508 с. — ISBN 5-86328-736-5
- Курганский государственный университет — 10 лет / редкол.: О. И. Бухтояров и др. - Курган : Зауралье, 2005. — 256 с. — ISBN 5-86328-807-8
- Путеводитель. Государственное учреждение «Государственный архив общественно-политической документации Курганской области»: Справочник по фондам архива. — Курган, 2009. — 327 с.
