= Sergei Teryayev =

Russian ice hockey player

- Born: October 13, 1994 (age 31) Kurgan, Kurgan Oblast, Russia
- Height: 5 ft 11 in (180 cm)
- Weight: 198 lb (90 kg; 14 st 2 lb)
- Position: Defence
- Shoots: Left
- VHL team Former teams: Sokol Krasnoyarsk; Toros Neftekamsk; Amur Khabarovsk
- Playing career: 2013–present

Sergei Teryayev (born October 13, 1994) is a Russian professional ice hockey defenceman. He is currently playing with Metallurg Novokuznetsk of the All-Russian Hockey League (VHL), the second-tier league in Russia.

Teryayev made his Kontinental Hockey League debut playing with Amur Khabarovsk during the 2013–14 season. During the 2015–16 season, Teryayev was traded by Amur to fellow KHL club, Salavat Yulaev Ufa on December 1, 2015. He was immediately re-assigned to affiliate, Toros Neftekamsk of the VHL.
