= Dmitry Paryshev =

Russian CEO (born 1979)

- Born: Dmitry Nikolaevich Paryshev; 15 May 1979 (age 47); Kurgan, Russian SFSR, Soviet Union
- Citizenship: Russian
- Education: Kurgan State University
- Occupation: CEO of JSC Kurganstalmost
- Years active: 2008–present

Dmitry Nikolaevich Paryshev (Russian: Дмитрий Николаевич Парышев; born May 15, 1979) has been the CEO of JSC Kurganstalmost since 2008.

== Early life and education ==
He was born on May 15, 1979, in the city of Kurgan.

When he was 11 years old, he transferred to a specialized hockey school (known as the Specialized Children and Youth School of the Olympic Reserve since 2023) in Voskresensk.

He graduated from the Economics Department of Kurgan State University in 2001, after which he went to serve in the army.

In 2014, he was elected a full member of the Academy of Transport.

In 2014, he participated in the Sochi Olympic Torch Relay in Kurgan.

== Career ==
From 1994 to 2001, he worked as a physical education instructor for the Kurgan hockey team Mostovik (known as Zauralie since 2003), owned by the Kurganstalmost enterprise. He also played for the club as a defender and later as a striker.

In 2002, after returning from the army, he became a pre-production workshop master at Kurganstalmost. In November of the same year, he moved to a similar position in the processing workshop, and in January 2003 – to the assembly welding workshop at the same company.

In 2003–2004, he was the deputy director of Marketing and Long-term Development.

In 2004, he became the executive director of Kurganstalmost. In this position, he was involved in the modernization of production, responsible for finding and selecting production solutions and equipment for Kurganstalmost. He insisted on using the German Laser Mat installation at the plant and participated in the process of certification, making Kurganstalmost the first representative of the domestic bridge building industry to apply laser metal cutting technologies.

From 2004 to 2007, he was a deputy of the Kurgan City Duma and was a member of the standing deputy commission on budget, taxes, and fees.

In 2008, he initiated the creation of the Kurganstalmost Training Center for training and certifying top-notch welders, which was established with the support of the German Welding Association DVS. Later, the Group ended the partnership with its German colleagues, and the educational project was implemented solely at Kurganstalmost's expense.

Since 2008, he has been the CEO of JSC Kurganstalmost. Dmitry Paryshev formulated a new development strategy for the company and diversified its business.

He personally headed a number of projects, including: construction of the Fisht Olympic Stadium in Sochi; construction of the Otkritie Bank Arena; supply and installation of structures for the Krasnodar football stadium; supply of 4,400 tons of metal structures for the construction of the Qazaqstan track and field sports complex in Astana; supply of 6,700 tons of metal structures for the Water Sports Palace in Yekaterinburg; participation in the construction of 10 stadiums for the 2018 FIFA World Cup; participation in the construction of the M-12 highway (the company supplied about 70% of the bridge structures); and the creation of the largest bridge beyond the Arctic Circle on the Ob-Bovanenkovo railway line across the Yuribey River.

Dmitry Paryshev made the decision during the economic crisis of 2008–2009 to switch the company to a three-day work week to save jobs. After the economic situation stabilized, the schedule returned to normal.

In 2014, he introduced a program to support veteran employees of the enterprise, offering additional financial assistance and social support.

In 2017, he founded the Kurganstalmost hockey team to promote the sport and physical culture in general at the enterprise and in the Kurgan Region.

=== Academia ===
Academic articles:

- Gerasimov V. Y., Paryshev D. N., Assessment of the Stability of Fastener Stamping Operations Based on the Deflection Magnitude of Workpieces, 2014
- Gerasimov V. Y., Paryshev D. N., Regularities of Forming Mechanical Properties in Cold-drawn Steel Rods, 2005
- Gerasimov V. Y., Paryshev D. N., Gerasimova O.V., Changes in Material Density During the Production of Calibrated Steel Rods, 2005
- Gerasimov V. Y., Paryshev D. N., Testing of High-strength Bolts with Different Tolerance Fields, 2006
- Gerasimov V. Y., Paryshev D. N., Influence of Metal Deformation Training on Bolt Strength Under Variable Tensile Stresses, 2006
- Gerasimov V. Y., Paryshev D. N., Increasing the Strength of Bolts Based on Deformation Training Under Variable Tensile Stresses, 2006
- Paryshev D. N., Gerasimov V. Y., Comparison of the Probability Field for Bolts in Terms of Temporary Resistance and Electrical Conductivity, 2008
- Gerasimov V. Y., Paryshev D. N., Gerasimova O.V., Assessment of the Hardening Effect During Drawing of Steel Bars Based on Changes in Metal Conductivity, 2009
- Gerasimov V. Y., Paryshev D. N., Durability of Threaded Connections Under the Action of Variable Bending Stresses, 2009
- Paryshev D. N., Gerasimov V. Y., Influence of Bolt Length on Tensile Strength, 2009
- Paryshev D. N., Gerasimov V. Y., Tensile Strength of Flat Samples with Angles, 2010
- Paryshev D. N., Gerasimov V. Y., Accelerated Method for Roughness Control on the Surface of Calibrated Steel Bars, 2011
- Gerasimov V. Y., Paryshev D. N., Production of Rod Threaded Products with Specified Accuracy and Strength, 2012
- Moiseev O. Y., Paryshev D. N., Ovchinnikov I. G., Kharin V. V., Snegiryov G. V., Small Bridges: Development Paths and Prospects for Use in the Kurgan Region and the Ural Federal District, 2014
- Moiseev O. Y., Paryshev D. N., Ovchinnikov I. G., Kopyrin V. I., Kharin V. V., Yakovlev L. S., Use of Metal Corrugated Structures in Small Bridge Construction, 2015
- Moiseev O. Y., Paryshev D. N., Ovchinnikov I. G., Kharin V. V., Vyatkin I. A., Snegiryov G. V., Small Bridges Using Composite Elements from Old Pipes, 2015
- Moiseev O. Y., Paryshev D. N., Ovchinnikov I. G., Kharin V. V., Ovchinnikov I. I., Pipe-Concrete Beams with a Partially Pre-stressed Concrete Core for Span Structures of Small Bridges, 2016
- Moiseev O. Y., Paryshev D. N., Ovchinnikov I. G., Kharin V. V., Ovchinnikov I. I. Straight Pipe-Concrete Beams with an Asymmetrically Pre-stressed Concrete Core for Span Structures of Small Bridges, 2016
- Moiseev O. Y., Paryshev D. N., Ovchinnikov I. G., Kharin V. V., Ovchinnikov I. I., Innovative Pipe-Concrete Beam for Span Structures of Beam-type Small Bridges, 2016
- Paryshev D. N., Iltyakov A. V., Moiseev O. Y., Ovchinnikov I. G., Kharin V. V., Development Paths of Small Bridge Construction, 2018
- Paryshev D. N., Iltyakov A. V., Moiseev O. Y., Ovchinnikov I. G., Kharin V. V., Problems of Small Bridges, 2018

Patents:

- RF Patent for utility model No. 79474, IPC 3 In 23 G 5/00. Tap / N. N. Ogarkov, D. N. Paryshev, E. A. Inkova
- RF Patent for utility model No. 78719, IPC 3 B 23 G 5/06. Tap for cleaning threaded holes / N. N. Ogarkov, D. N. Paryshev, E. A. Inkova

== Social and charitable activities ==
Dmitry Paryshev-Kurganstalmost covers 65% of the expenses for the Zauralie Hockey Club in Kurgan.

On the initiative of Dmitry Paryshev, Kurganstalmost purchases the necessary equipment for Lyudmila Pshenichnikova, a member of the national bench shooting team. The company also supports motorsport, helps organize car and truck races, and sponsors the Kurgan Racetrack.

In 2016, at the initiative of Paryshev, Kurganstalmost began to participate in the construction of social facilities. By 2023, a reinforced concrete bridge was built, and a clinic building of the Kurgan Regional Clinical Hospital, three schools in Kurgan, and one in the Kurgan Region were under construction. The company is also building kindergartens, a surgical building of the Kurgan Oncological Dispensary, a cultural development center in Shumikha, and a swimming pool in Kurgan.

== Awards ==
- Title of “Honorary Builder of RF” for a significant personal contribution to the development of the construction industry (2004)
- St. Andrew the First-Called Medal “For Loyalty” for the introduction of new progressive forms of work organization and a significant contribution to solving social problems (2005)
- Title of “Laureate of the Peter the Great National Award” for high professionalism and effective enterprise management (2008)
- Cross of the Order “Builder of the 21st Century” for a significant contribution to the development of the construction industry and active social policy (2008)
- Badge and certificate “For Excellence in Service” I Degree (2009)
- Certificate of the annual regional contest “Director of the Year” for the S. A. Balakshin Award (2012)
- “Man of the Year 2013” award in the Bridge Construction category for a significant contribution to the development of domestic and international transport infrastructure (2013)
- “Marshal Vasily Chuikov” commemorative medal for impeccable service to civil defense, prevention and elimination of the consequences of emergencies, high-quality performance of official duties, and in connection with the 81st anniversary of the formation of Civil Defense (2013)
- Distinction of the Kurgan Region “For a Good Deed” (2015)
- “22nd Olympic and 11th Paralympic Winter Games 2014 in Sochi” commemorative medal for a significant contribution to the preparation and holding of the 22nd Olympic and 11th Paralympic Winter Games (2014)
- Title of “Honorary Citizen of the City of Kurgan” (2021)
- Medal “For the Construction of Transport Facilities” (2022)

== Personal life ==
Dmitry Paryshev is married, with three children. He enjoys hockey, skiing, and hunting.
