= Matrosskaya Tishina =

Jail in Moscow, Russia

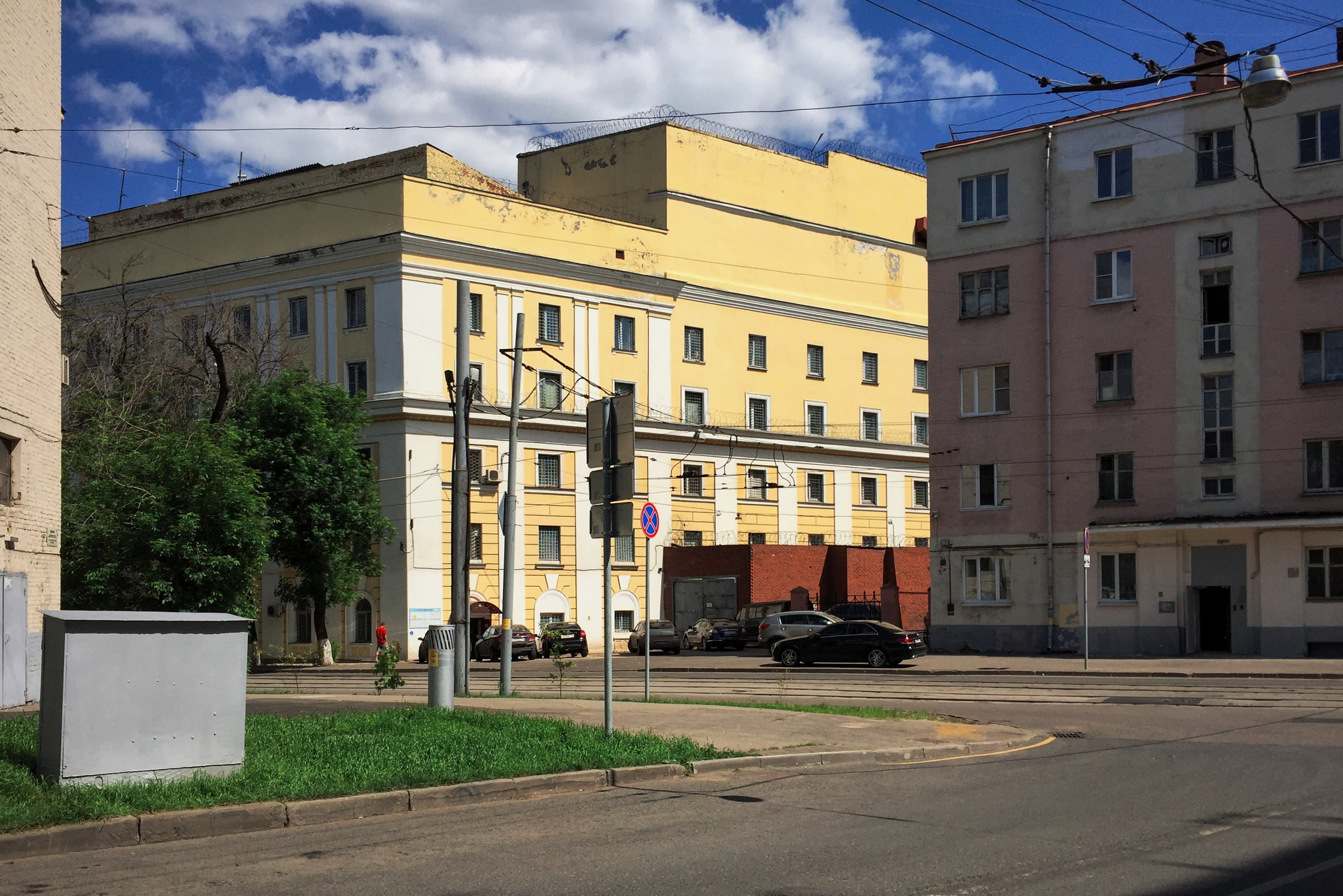
- Interactive map of Matrosskaya Tishina
- Location: Sokolniki District, Moscow, Russia; 55°47′31″N 37°41′49″E
- Opened: 1945
- Managed by: Federal Penitentiary Service
- Governor: Abdulaev Ramazan Salikhovich

Federal State Institution IZ-77/1 of the Office of the Federal Penitentiary Service of Russia in the City of Moscow is a prison located in the Sokolniki District of Moscow, Russia. The facility is commonly known as Matrosskaya Tishina (Russian: Матросская тишина, lit. "Seaman's Silence"), after the name of the street on which it is located in north-eastern Moscow. Matrosskaya Tishina is operated by the Federal Penitentiary Service, and is famous for having held several notable prisoners, including Mikhail Khodorkovsky and Platon Lebedev; Gennady Yanaev, the leader of the 1991 Soviet coup d'état attempt; and Alexei Navalny.

== History ==
The site of Matrosskaya Tishina has been home to detention facilities since 1775, when an insane asylum, run by a charitable organization, was opened, and in 1870 the facility was reformed as Moscow Prison with an occupancy for 300 men and 150 women. In 1912, new purpose-built prison blocks designed by architect Boris Alberti were erected, and in 1918 was transformed into a reformatory for juvenile convicts.

Matrosskaya Tishina was established in its current form in 1945 by Soviet authorities following World War II. It was operated by the Ministry of Internal Affairs as No. 14 of the Ministry of Internal Affairs for Moscow Area from 1946 until 1956, when the prison was renamed SIZO No. 1 of the Moscow Main Department of Internal Affairs. Initially, the new prison had two main buildings, accommodating more than 2,000 adult prisoners, before being increased to three buildings. From 1949 to 1953, the third building housed a special prison containing war criminals from the Third Reich, as well as prisoners who worked in the Special Technical Bureau of the Ministry of Internal Affairs. From 1953 until 1997, the third building housed juvenile delinquents, and since 1999 has housed the tuberculosis department. Since 1997, SIZO No. 1 was subordinated to the Main Penitentiary Department (GUIN) of the Ministry of Justice of the Russian Federation, and at that time it contained up to 5,000 prisoners under investigation or awaiting sentencing.

== Escapes ==
Only three prisoners have been able to successfully escape from Matrosskaya Tishina.

On June 5, 1995, Alexander Solonik, a notorious hitman and member of a prominent Kurgan criminal group, managed to escape from the prison.

On May 2, 2004, Sergey Ershov, a Ukrainian man escaped by dismantling brickwork and breaking the perimeter fence, receiving numerous injuries in the process. However, since Ershov was detained less than 24 hours after the escape, it was recognized only as an attempt.

On March 13, 2003, Aleksei Djulger, a prisoner from Kursk given right to free movement by prison authorities, disappeared and was believed to have escaped. Djulger was found several days later hiding in the rubble of construction debris on the prison grounds, eating waste from a container in a nearby garbage can. Djulger had been gambling with his cellmates and subsequently lost a large sum of money, deciding to hide rather than risk persecution for his gambling debts.

On May 7, 2013, Oleg Topalov, accused of theft and double murder, escaped after pulling himself through a hole in the ceiling of his cell he had dug solely with a metal spoon, climbing onto the roof and over the perimeter fence. Authorities blamed the non-observant and corrupt security guards for Topalov's escape, as he had escaped using civilian clothing and mountaineering equipment bought from a guard. Topalov was apprehended the following day in Izmailovsky Park.

== Notable prisoners ==
- Mikhail Khodorkovsky
- Platon Lebedev
- Sergei Magnitsky
- Nadiya Savchenko
- Alexey Ulyukaev
- Alexei Navalny
- Dmitry Demushkin
- Aleksandr Khoroshavin
- Vyacheslav Ivankov
- Maxim Martsinkevich
- Sergei Mavrodi
- Michael Calvey
- Gennady Yanayev
- Alexander Barkashov
- Sergey Golovkin
- Maria Petrova
- Valery Boldin
- Andrey Derevyankin
- Semion Mogilevich
- Alexander Pichushkin
- Ilya Traber
- Yuri Budanov
- Sergei Polonsky
- Konstantin Kotov
- Vladimir Kumarin
