= Konstantin Kotov =

Russian political activist

- Константин Котов
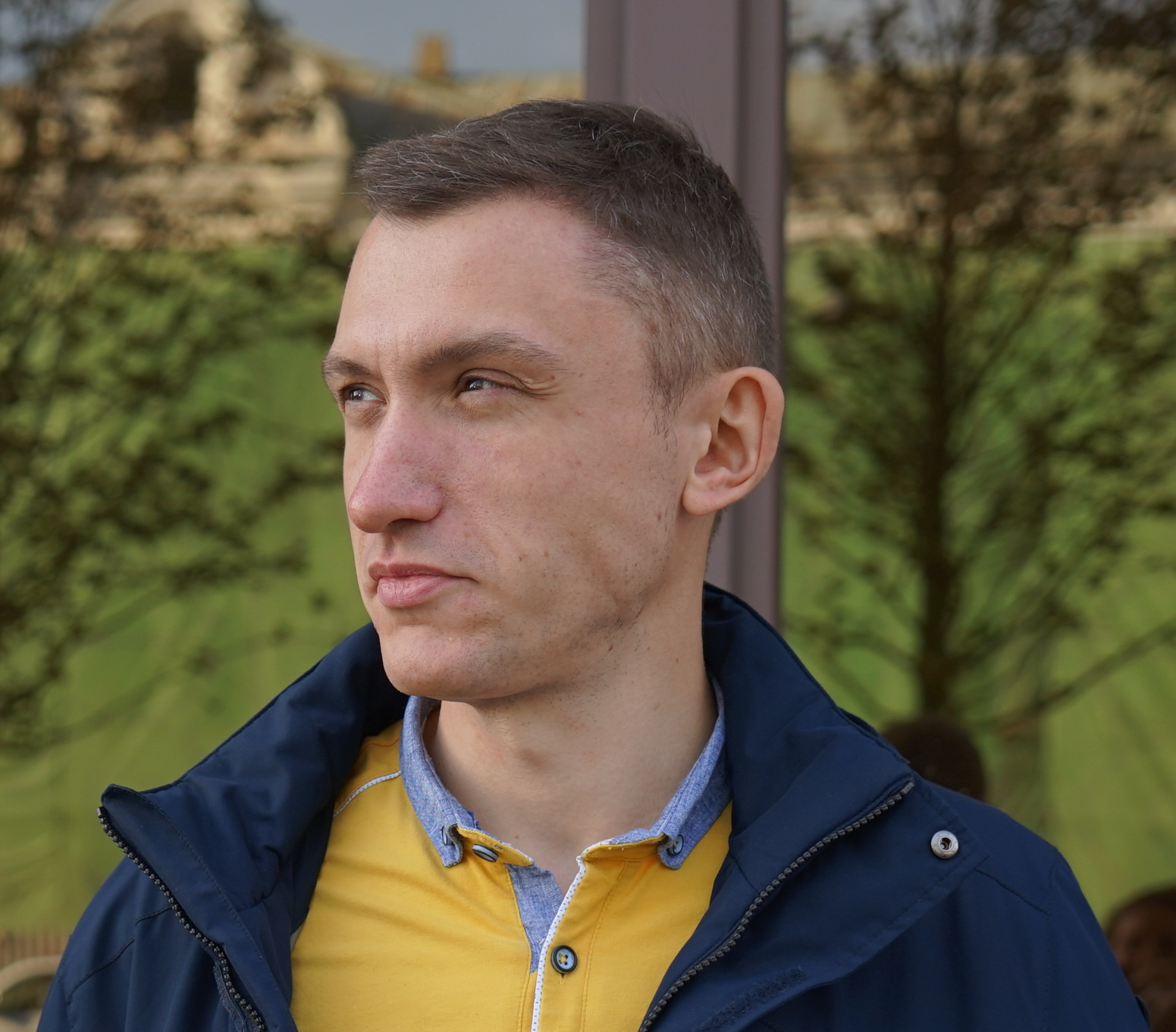
- Kotov in 2018
- Born: Konstantin Aleksandrovich Kotov; 22 February 1985 (age 41); Moscow, Russian SFSR, Soviet Union
- Occupations: Programmer, activist

Konstantin Aleksandrovich Kotov (Russian: Константин Александрович Котов; born 22 February 1985) is a Russian software engineer and political activist. In September 2019, he was sentenced to four years in prison for participating in unsanctioned protests and was declared a prisoner of conscience by Amnesty International. After a public outcry, his sentencing was reviewed and reduced. He was released from prison in December 2020.

== Biography ==
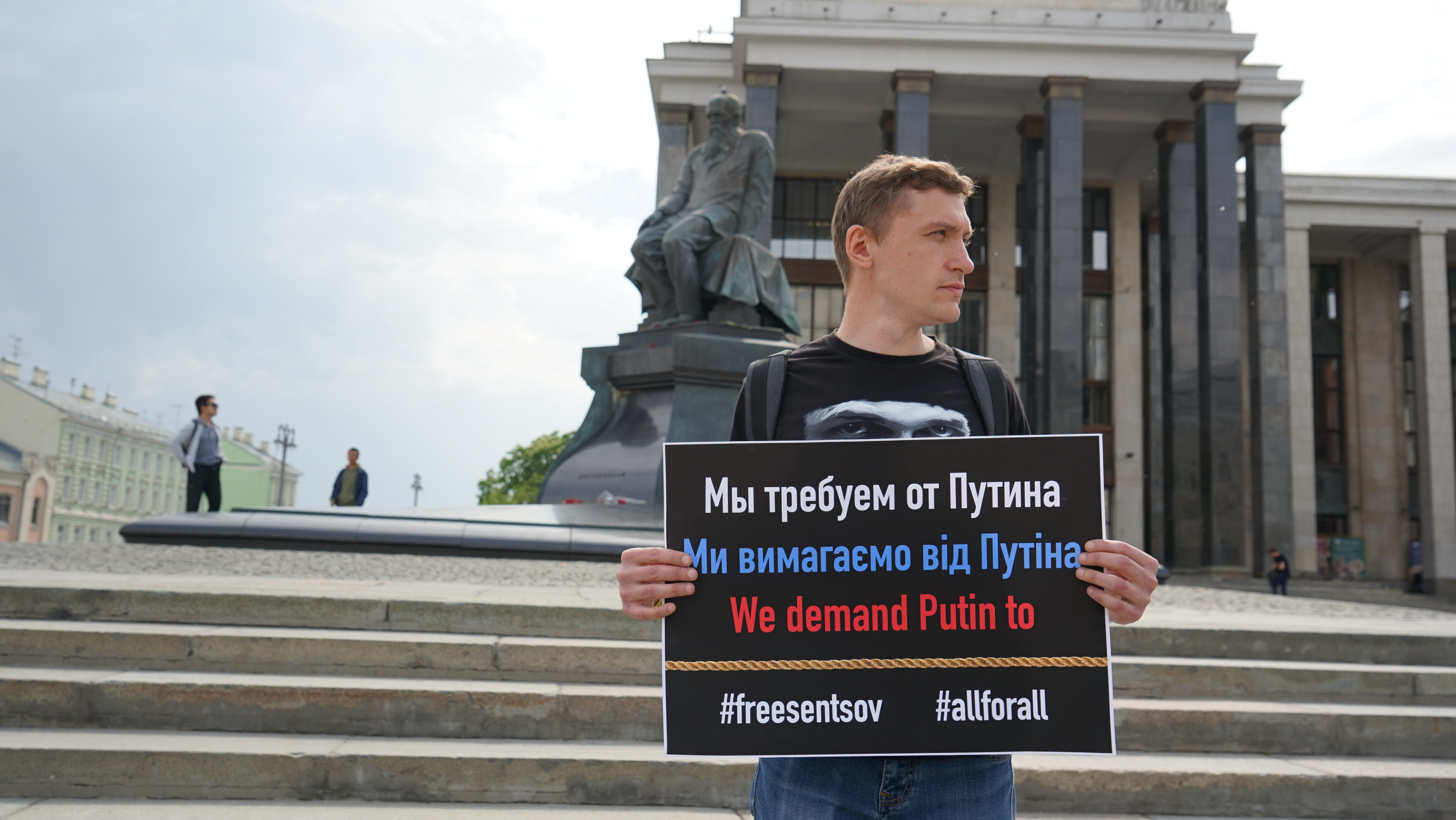
Kotov at the Russian State Library in a picket demanding for the release of Oleg Sentsov in 2019

Konstantin Aleksandrovich Kotov was born on 22 February 1985 in Moscow. He studied in higher education and worked as a programmer at the Semenikhin Research Institute in Moscow.

Since 2016, Kotov has been known for his political activism and was an organizer of a picket in support of the imprisoned Ukrainian filmmaker Oleg Sentsov in 2018.

In August 2019, Kotov was detained at a protest and in September, was sentenced to four years in prison for participating in unsanctioned protests, a case he called politically motivated. He was regarded by Amnesty International as a prisoner of conscience. After a public outcry, President Vladimir Putin in January 2020 ordered the Prosecutor-General's Office to review the sentencing's legality and two days later, the Constitutional Court of Russia ruled that the case must be reviewed. In April, the Moscow City Court upheld the sentence but reduced Kotov's prison sentence to 18 months and his term was recalculated to include his time served in pre-trial detention (where one day equals 1.5 days served at a corrective colony). In December, Kotov was released from prison upon completion of his prison term.

Put back under house arrest for donation to Alexei Navalny foundation, Kotov left Russia in 2024.

== Awards ==
In December 2019, Kotov was chosen by readers of Vedomosti as Person of the Year in the Private Individual category.

In June 2020, Kotov was the winner of the Boris Nemtsov Prize for 2020 by the Boris Nemtsov Foundation for Freedom.

In December 2020, Kotov was awarded the Moscow Helsinki Group Prize for courage in protecting human rights.

== Personal life ==
In October 2019, Kotov married Anna Pavlikova (born 2000), co-defendant in the New Greatness case, while he was being held at the Matrosskaya Tishina detention center.
