= Aleksandr Vinogradov (writer) =

Aleksandr Aleksandrovich Vinogradov
- Born: 9 September 1930; Skrylevo, Moscow Oblast, RSFSR, USSR (now in Tver Oblast, Russia)
- Died: 14 June 2011 (aged 80); Alyokhnovo, Istrinsky District, Moscow Oblast, Russia
- Children: Sergei Vinogradov
- Writing career
- Language: Russian language

Aleksandr Aleksandrovich Vinogradov (Russian: Алекса́ндр Алекса́ндрович Виногра́дов; September 9, 1930 – June 14, 2011) was a Soviet and Russian journalist and writer. He was the editor-in-chief and director of the Detskaya Literatura publishing house.

== Early life ==
Aleksandr Vinogradov was born in 1930 in Skrylevo, then a village in Moscow Oblast (now in Tver Oblast). In 1935 he supercooled his ears and had to go through an operation, as a result of which, however, he was able to keep his hearing. His younger cousin Dmitry (born 1931), who had also supercooled his ears, was unable to survive the operation and died. He soon moved to Leningrad where he went to school. However, in 1941, after the city had been surrounded by the German army, he managed to escape with his mother and sisters. His father, Aleksandr, stayed and died from hunger in early 1942. Aleksandr Jr. returned to his village, which became part of the newly formed Kalinin Oblast. During the war he worked at a kolkhoz called the Dawn of the Communes (Zarya Kommun). After the end of the war, he resumed his studies at school but had to take a sabbatical in 1947, when he got sick with tuberculosis. However, he was able to survive the life-threatening disease and came back to school.

== Professional career ==
In 1950 Aleksandr Vinogradov entered the journalism faculty of the Leningrad State University. Upon graduation in 1955, he became a correspondent for the Red Kurgan (Krasnyy Kurgan) newspaper and moved to Kurgan. In 1957 he became an editor for the Young Leninets (Molodoy Leninets) newspaper. In 1959 he had his first trip abroad to China.

In 1960 Aleksandr Vinogradov was transferred to Moscow. He became an instructor in the propaganda and campaigning department of the Komsomol. In 1962 he became deputy editor of the Komsomol life department for the Komsomolskaya Pravda daily. In 1963 he was appointed editor of the Our relatives (Nashy rodnye) department of the Vokrug Sveta magazine. This department was responsible for animal stories. In 1964 he became editor-in-chief of the Young Naturalist (Yunyy Naturalist) magazine. At the same time, he began writing stories, mostly describing his foreign trips and the impressions he got from visiting the different countries, such as the United States (Rock and Roll on the Knees), China (On the Shore of the Mighty Yangtze), Japan (The Bitter Smile of the Samurai), Mexico (Aztecs: The 20th Century).

In January 1975 Aleksandr Vinogradov became editor-in-chief of the Children's Literature magazine, a publishing house specializing in editing and printing works of literature for children from around the world. The Library of world literature for children was published under Vinogradov's directorship. In 1982 he became the magazine's director. In the meantime, he continued writing and moved on to more psychologically complex novels, that dealt with the issue of death and life values. It was at this time that his most famous works, At the End of the Alley (V Kontse Allei) and The Unsheathed Saber (Sablya bez Nozhen) were published. In 1984, however, Vinogradov was forced to take a break from work after suffering a heart attack. In 1985 he was transferred to the Raduga publishing house, where he took the position of deputy editor-in-chief. He retired in October 1991.

Vinogradov continued writing in the 1990s and published the stories The Misfire (Osechka) in 2001 and The Murdered Daylights (Ubityye Rassvety) in 2005.

== Personal life ==
Aleksandr Vinogradov was married twice. In 1951 he married Nellya Danilova, but got divorced within a year. His second marriage proved to be much longer. In 1956 he married Elvira Belinina with whom he stayed together until his death. He had one child, born in 1958.

== Illness and death ==
In December 2001 Aleksandr Vinogradov suffered a stroke which had little immediate consequences, with his eyesight and balance only slightly affected. However, he soon began to develop a glaucoma on the retina of his right eye, hampering his ability to see and write. In the late 2000s he started to develop brain ischemia, leading to problems with memory, judgment and gait. Possibly affected by his son's death, his condition severely worsened in May 2011, when he became unable to stand and started experienced hallucinations. He was placed in a hospital, but that only provided temporary relief and upon discharge, his range of debilitating symptoms returned. He died on June 14, 2011, at his dacha in the village of Alyokhnovo in the Istrinsky District of Moscow Oblast, where he was being taken care of by his wife. A burial ceremony took place on June 16, 2011, and he was cremated soon afterwards. His funerary urn was placed into the crematorium wall of Troyekurovskoye Cemetery.
