= Kurgan, Kurgan Oblast =

City in Russia

Kurgan Курган
- City
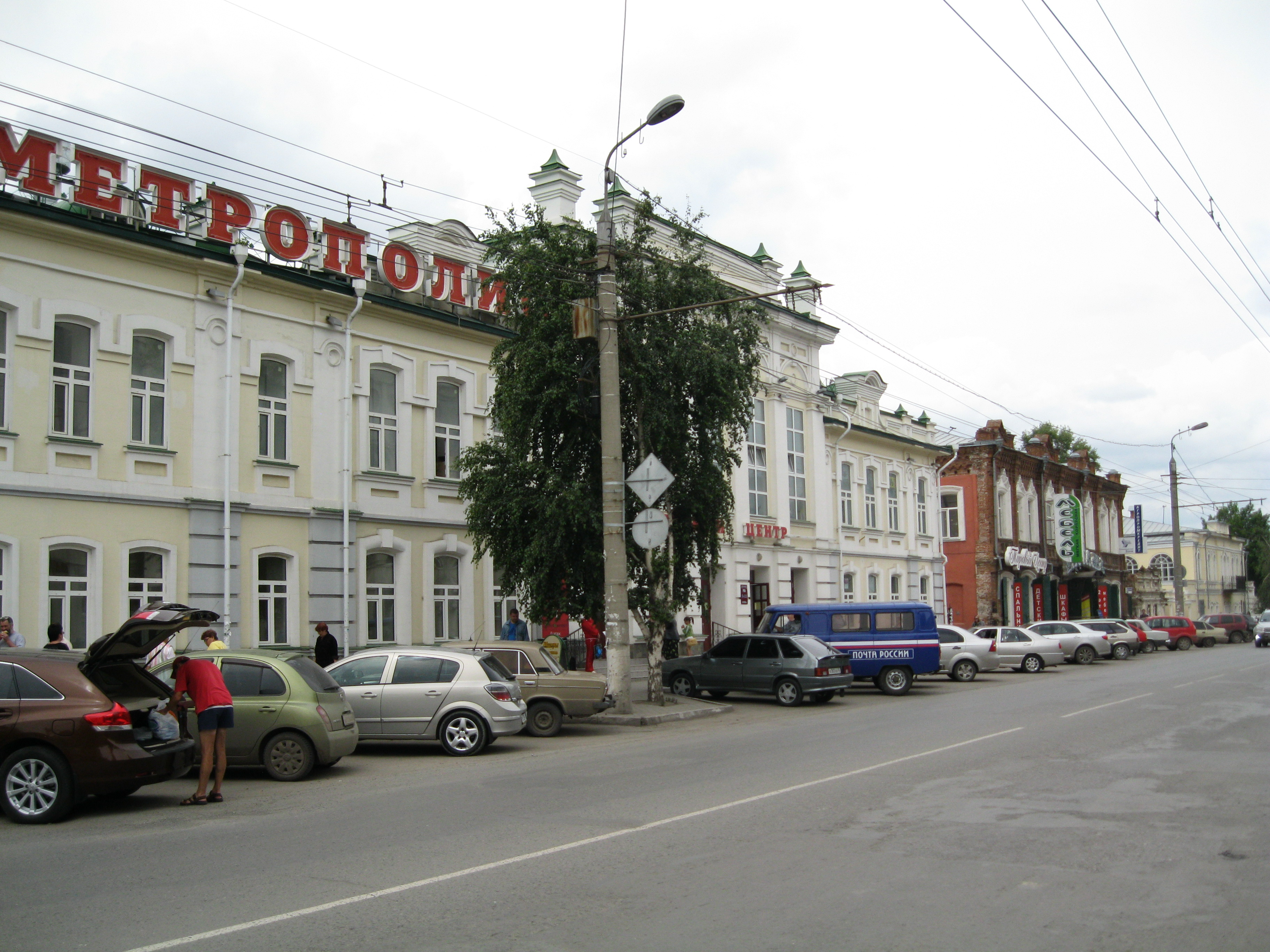
- Kuybyshev Street in Kurgan

- Flag Coat of arms
- Interactive map of Kurgan
- Location of Kurgan Kurgan (Kurgan Oblast)
- Coordinates: 55°28′N 65°21′E
- Country: Russia
- Federal subject: Kurgan Oblast
- Founded: 1679
- City status since: 1782

Government
  - Body: City Duma
  - Head: Anton Naumenko (Антон Науменко)

Area
  - Total: 393 km^{2} (152 sq mi)
- Elevation: 75 m (246 ft)

Population (2010 Census)
  - Total: 333,606
  - Estimate (2025): 300,763 (−9.8%)
  - Rank: 53rd in 2010
  - Density: 849/km^{2} (2,200/sq mi)

Administrative status
  - Subordinated to: Kurgan City Under Oblast Jurisdiction
  - Capital of: Kurgan Oblast, Kurgan City Under Oblast Jurisdiction

Municipal status
  - Urban okrug: Kurgan Urban Okrug
  - Capital of: Kurgan Urban Okrug
- Time zone: UTC+5 (MSK+2)
- Postal code: 640ххх
- Dialing code: +7 3522
- OKTMO ID: 37701000001
- Website: www.kurgan-city.ru

Kurgan (Russian: Курган, IPA: [kʊrˈɡan]) is the largest city and the administrative center of Kurgan Oblast in the south of the Urals Federal District of Russia. Population: 310,911 (2021 census); 333,606 (2010 census); 345,515 (2002 census); 355,517 (1989 Soviet census).

Historical population
Year	Pop.	±%
1897	10,306	—
1926	27,996	+171.6%
1939	53,253	+90.2%
1959	145,712	+173.6%
1970	243,850	+67.4%
1979	309,863	+27.1%
1989	355,517	+14.7%
2002	345,515	−2.8%
2010	333,606	−3.4%
2021	310,911	−6.8%
Source: Census data

Until 1782, Kurgan bore the name Tsaryovo Gorodishche.

== History ==
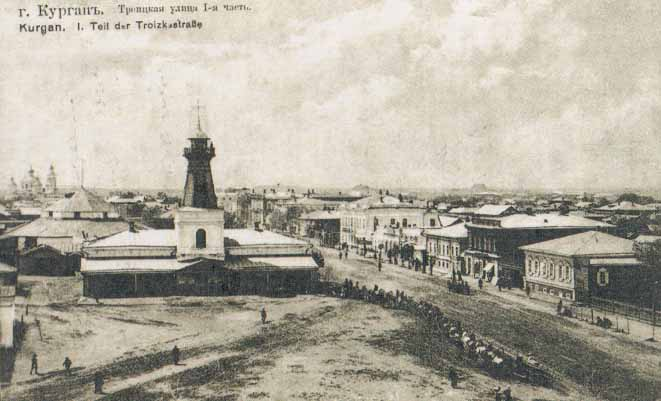
Kurgan in the 1850s

An urban settlement was established here between 1659 and 1662 as Tsaryovo Gorodishche (Царёво Городи́ще, meaning Imperial Citadel) by Timofey Nevezhin, a farmer from Tyumen. In the ensuing years it was developed as a fortress town. It served as a frontier post and its fortified position enabled it to defend other Russian settlements from nomad attacks. Nevertheless, it was itself not always able to withstand such attacks, and was sometimes plundered and burnt down.

The city was granted city privileges by the Empress Catherine the Great in 1782, which is when it acquired its present name and became the seat of an uyezd. The present name is taken from a large kurgan (burial mound) close to the original settlement.

Its coat of arms was granted on 17 March 1785, and it became the administrative center of Kurgan Oblast in 1943. Kurgan was awarded the Order of the Red Banner of Labour in 1982.

== Administrative and municipal status ==
Kurgan is the administrative center of the oblast. Within the framework of administrative divisions, it is incorporated as Kurgan City Under Oblast Jurisdiction—an administrative unit with the status equal to that of the districts. As a municipal division, Kurgan City Under Oblast Jurisdiction is incorporated as Kurgan Urban Okrug.

== Economy and military ==
Kurgan stands on the Trans-Siberian Railway line, between Yekaterinburg and Omsk. It is served by two railway stations and the Kurgan Airport, and it was home to the Kurgan West air base during the Cold War. It is also home to Russian Ilizarov Scientific Center for Restorative Traumatology and Orthopaedics, KAvZ autobus plant, and the machine building company Kurganmashzavod which produces the widely known BMP-1, BMP-2 and BMP-3 infantry fighting vehicles.

== Climate ==
Kurgan has a humid continental climate (Köppen climate classification Dfb). Influenced by the Siberian High, it is a relatively dry climate. Winters are cold, although not severe by Siberian standards. Summers are variable but relatively moderate, even though heat waves can bring temperatures well above the 26 °C (79 °F) average July highs.

Climate data for Kurgan (1991–2020, extremes 1893–present)
Month	Jan	Feb	Mar	Apr	May	Jun	Jul	Aug	Sep	Oct	Nov	Dec	Year
Record high °C (°F)	4.3 (39.7)	8.0 (46.4)	17.3 (63.1)	31.3 (88.3)	36.6 (97.9)	38.5 (101.3)	41.2 (106.2)	38.5 (101.3)	35.8 (96.4)	24.6 (76.3)	14.2 (57.6)	5.8 (42.4)	41.2 (106.2)
Mean daily maximum °C (°F)	−11.4 (11.5)	−8.9 (16.0)	−0.7 (30.7)	11.1 (52.0)	20.2 (68.4)	24.5 (76.1)	25.8 (78.4)	23.6 (74.5)	17.1 (62.8)	8.8 (47.8)	−2.5 (27.5)	−9.2 (15.4)	8.2 (46.8)
Daily mean °C (°F)	−15.5 (4.1)	−13.8 (7.2)	−5.7 (21.7)	5.1 (41.2)	13.4 (56.1)	18.2 (64.8)	19.7 (67.5)	17.4 (63.3)	11.1 (52.0)	4.1 (39.4)	−6.0 (21.2)	−12.9 (8.8)	2.9 (37.2)
Mean daily minimum °C (°F)	−19.4 (−2.9)	−18.3 (−0.9)	−10.2 (13.6)	0.0 (32.0)	6.8 (44.2)	11.9 (53.4)	13.7 (56.7)	11.9 (53.4)	6.2 (43.2)	0.2 (32.4)	−9.3 (15.3)	−16.6 (2.1)	−1.9 (28.6)
Record low °C (°F)	−47.9 (−54.2)	−47.9 (−54.2)	−44.3 (−47.7)	−27.2 (−17.0)	−10.5 (13.1)	−3.5 (25.7)	2.8 (37.0)	−1.6 (29.1)	−7.7 (18.1)	−24.8 (−12.6)	−38.8 (−37.8)	−46.4 (−51.5)	−47.9 (−54.2)
Average precipitation mm (inches)	18 (0.7)	14 (0.6)	18 (0.7)	22 (0.9)	38 (1.5)	51 (2.0)	61 (2.4)	52 (2.0)	34 (1.3)	34 (1.3)	28 (1.1)	21 (0.8)	391 (15.4)
Average extreme snow depth cm (inches)	24 (9.4)	30 (12)	26 (10)	4 (1.6)	0 (0)	0 (0)	0 (0)	0 (0)	0 (0)	1 (0.4)	6 (2.4)	18 (7.1)	30 (12)
Average rainy days	1	1	4	10	16	16	15	17	18	14	6	2	120
Average snowy days	23	18	14	6	2	0.1	0	0	1	9	17	21	111
Average relative humidity (%)	82	80	78	66	59	63	69	72	74	77	81	81	74
Mean monthly sunshine hours	72	118	185	237	279	306	300	251	180	109	69	56	2,162
Source 1: Pogoda.ru.net
Source 2: NOAA (sun, 1961–1990)

== Educational facilities ==
- Agricultural academy
- Kurgan State University
- Kurgan International University
- Military Academy
- Railroad Academy
- Various theaters
- Academy of Labor and Social Relations

== Gallery ==
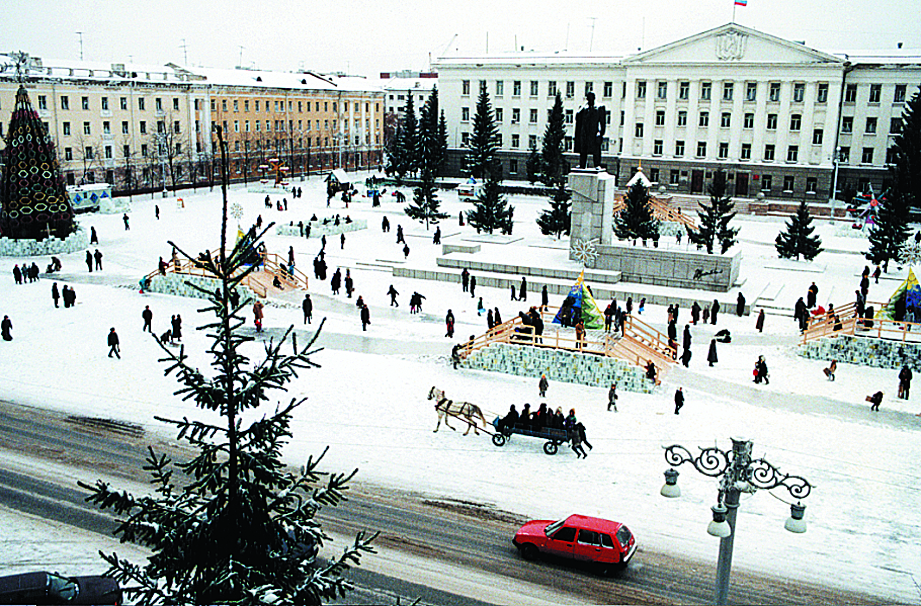
Lenin Square

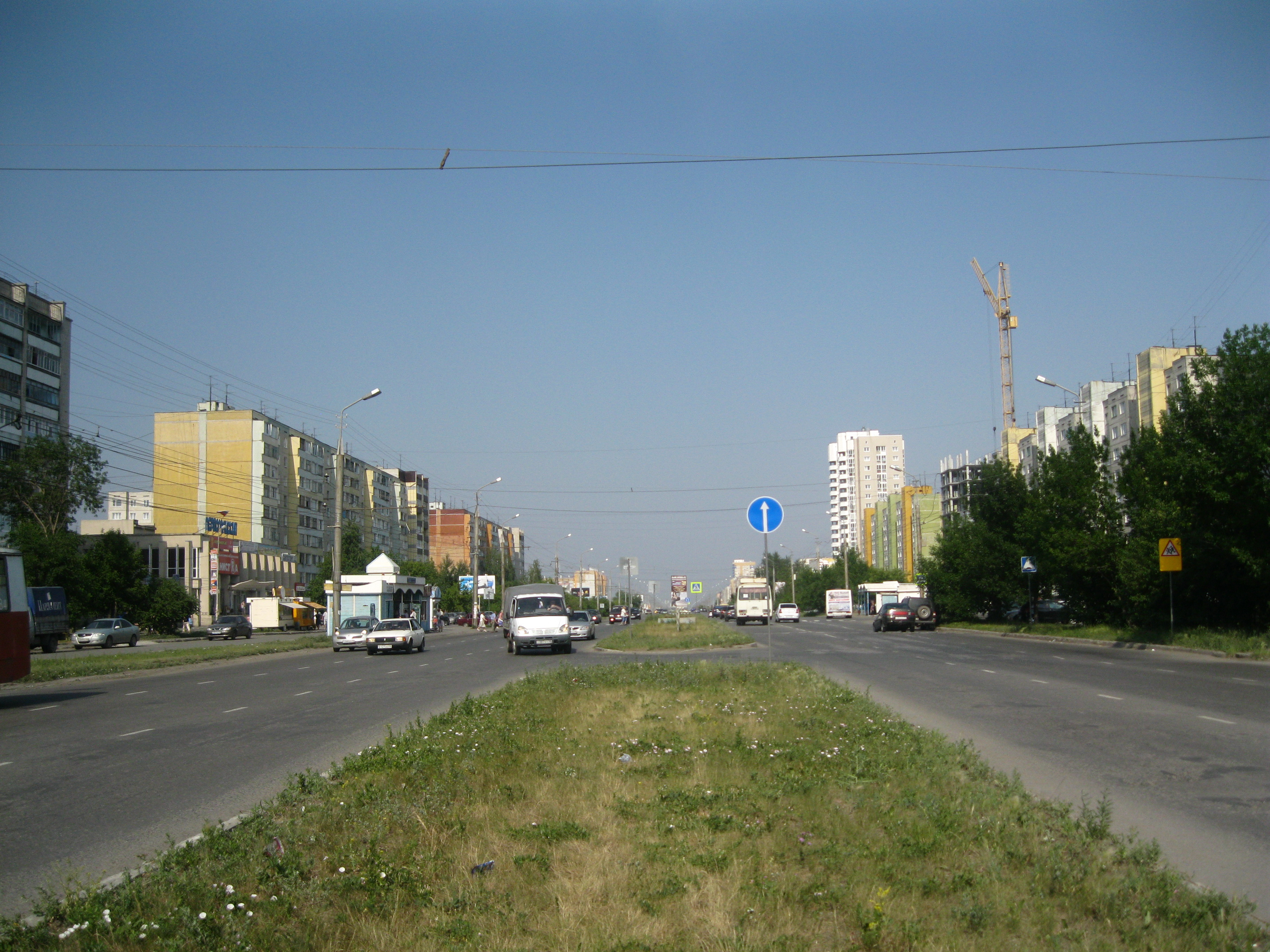
Marshal Golikov avenue

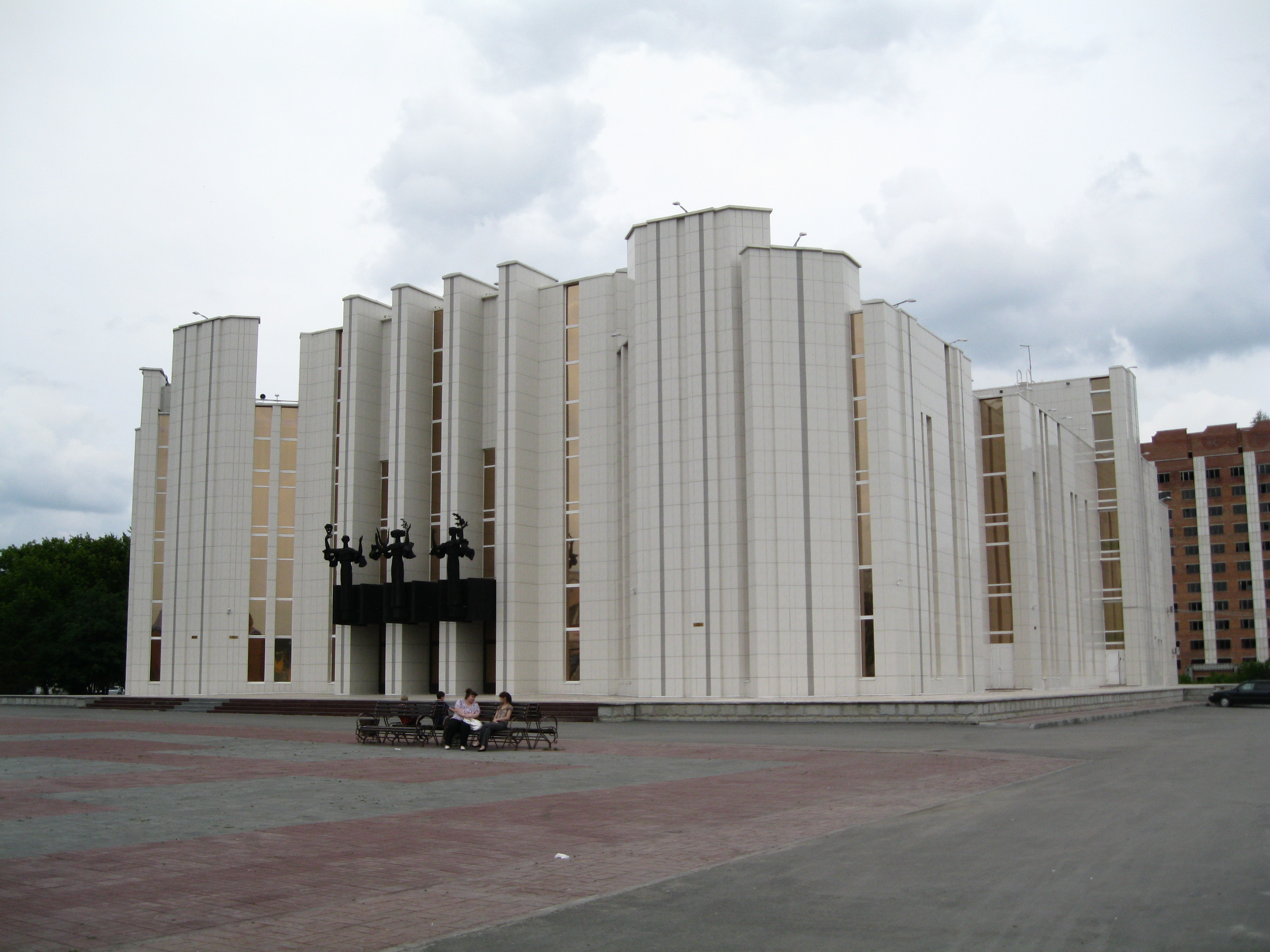
Kurgan Regional Philharmonic Society

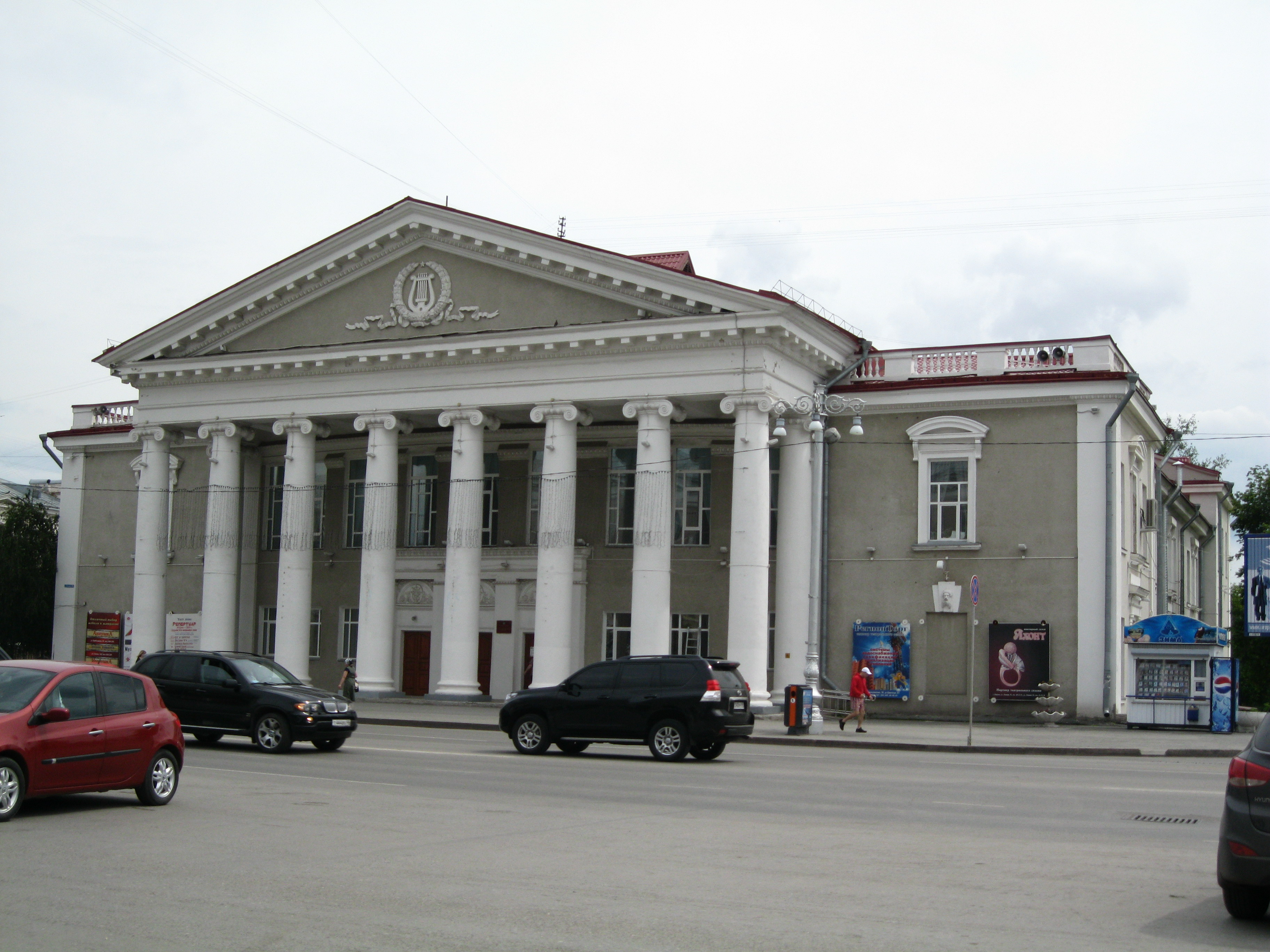
Kurgan Drama Theater

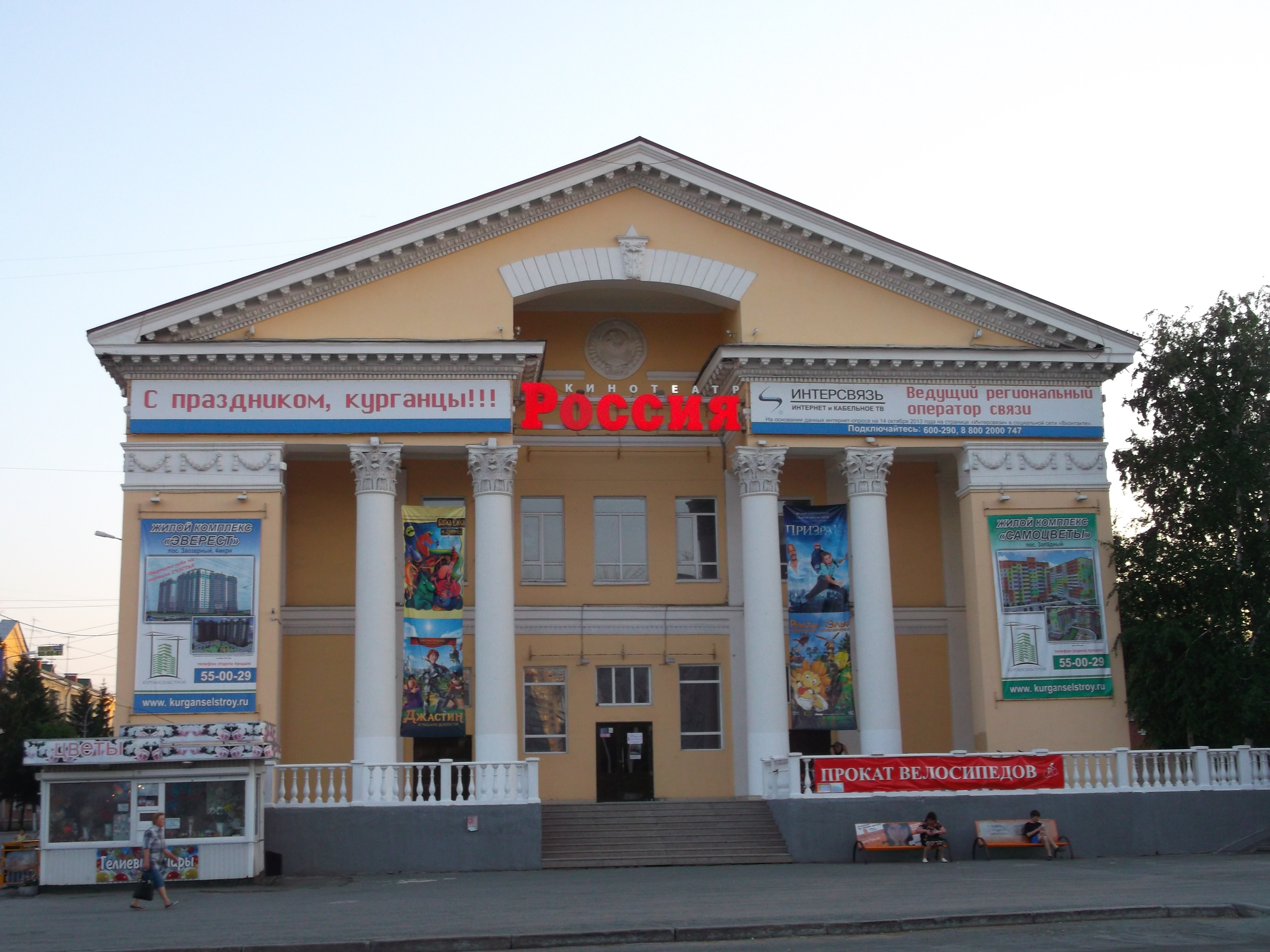
Cinema "Rossiya"

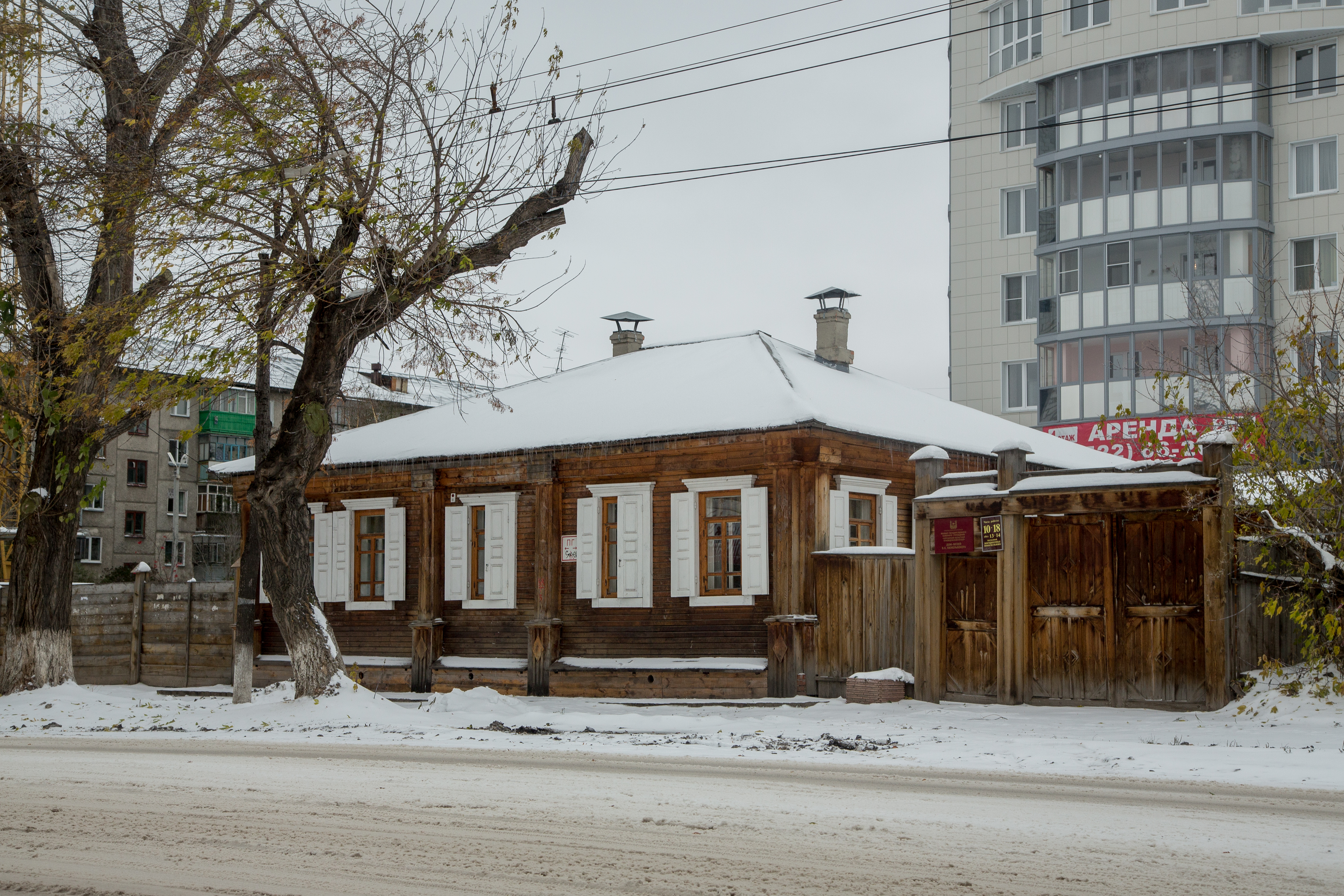
Wilhelm Küchelbecker house museum

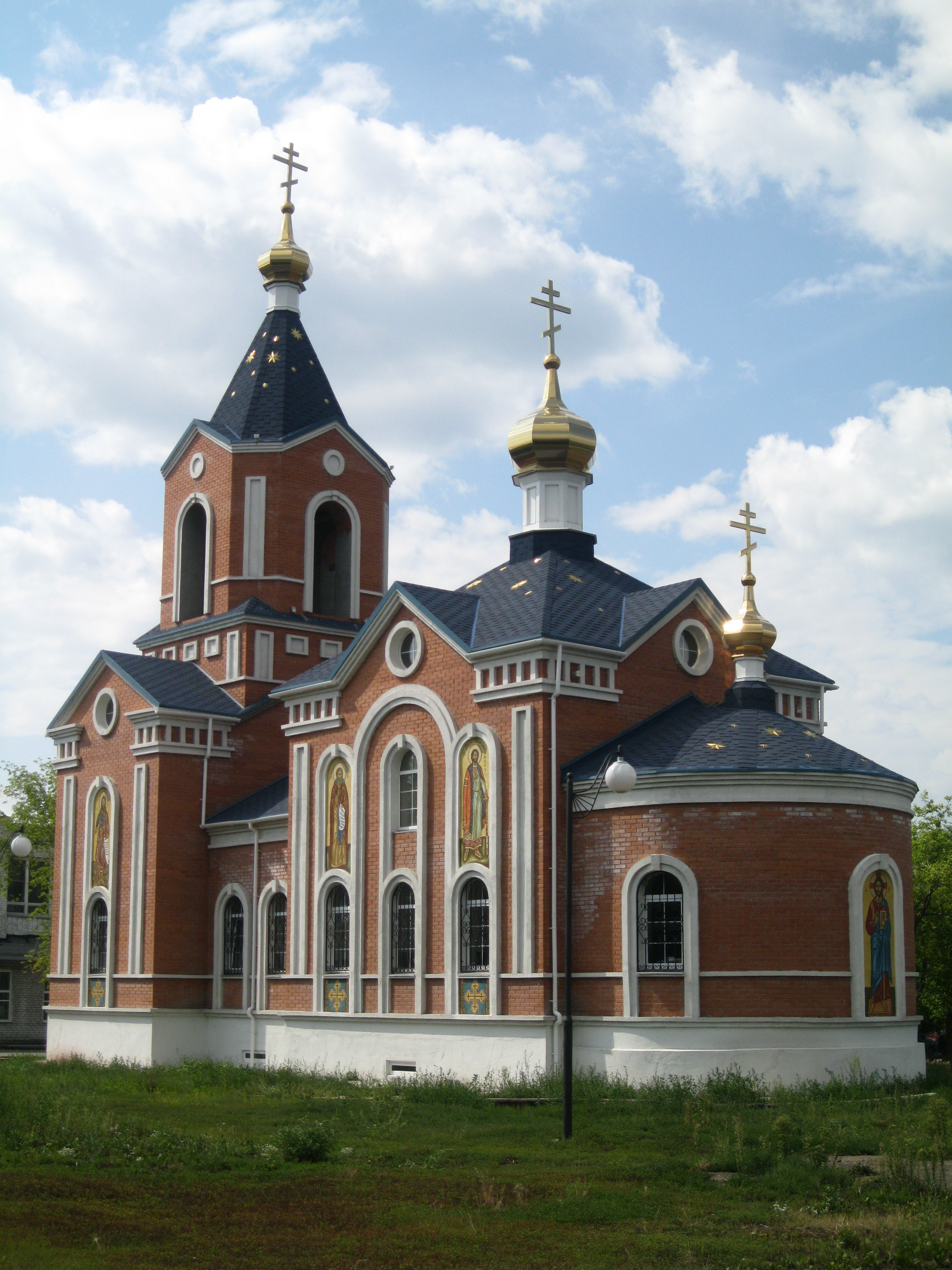
Russian Orthodox Church Theotokos of Port Arthur church

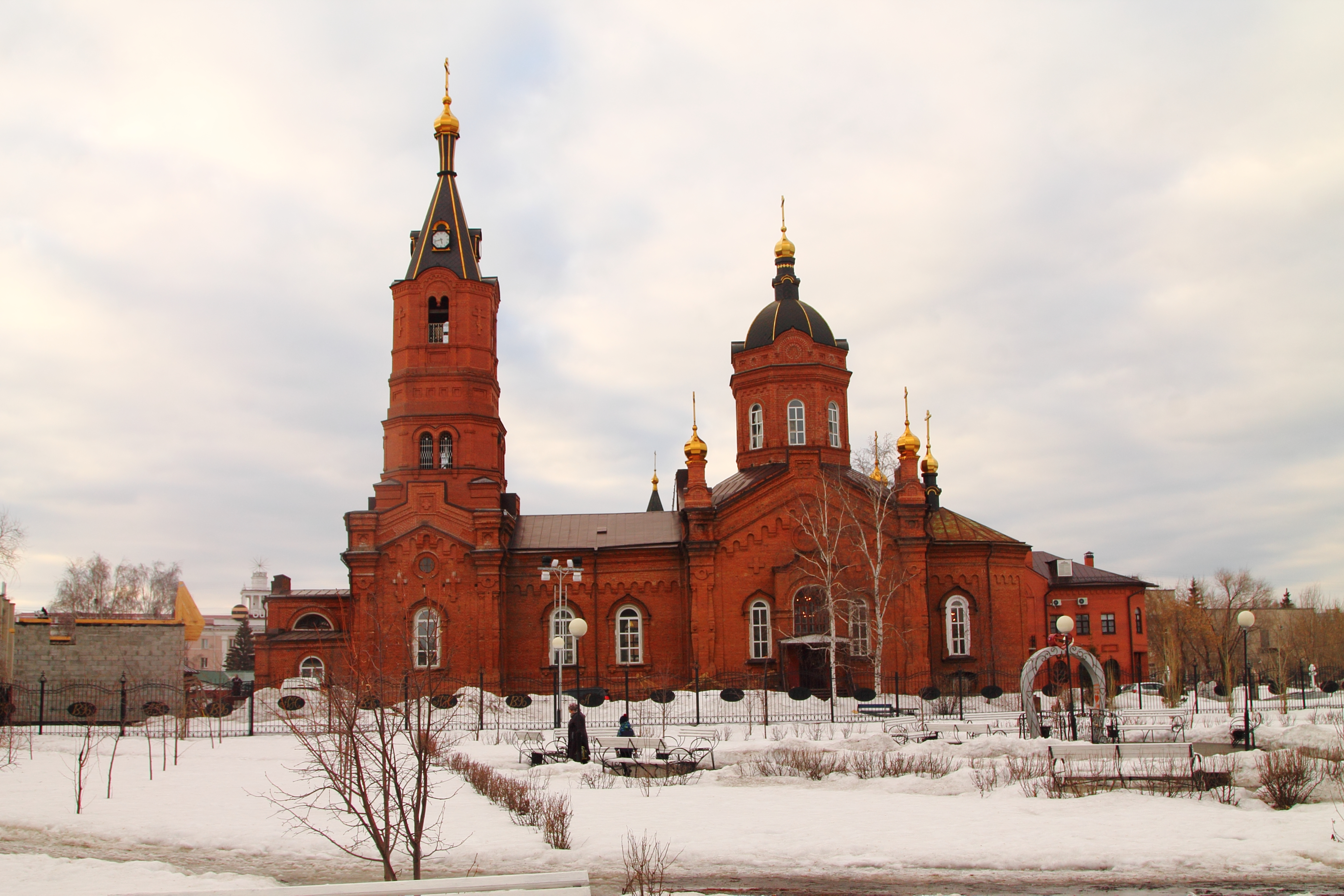
Russian Orthodox Church Alexander Nevsky Cathedral

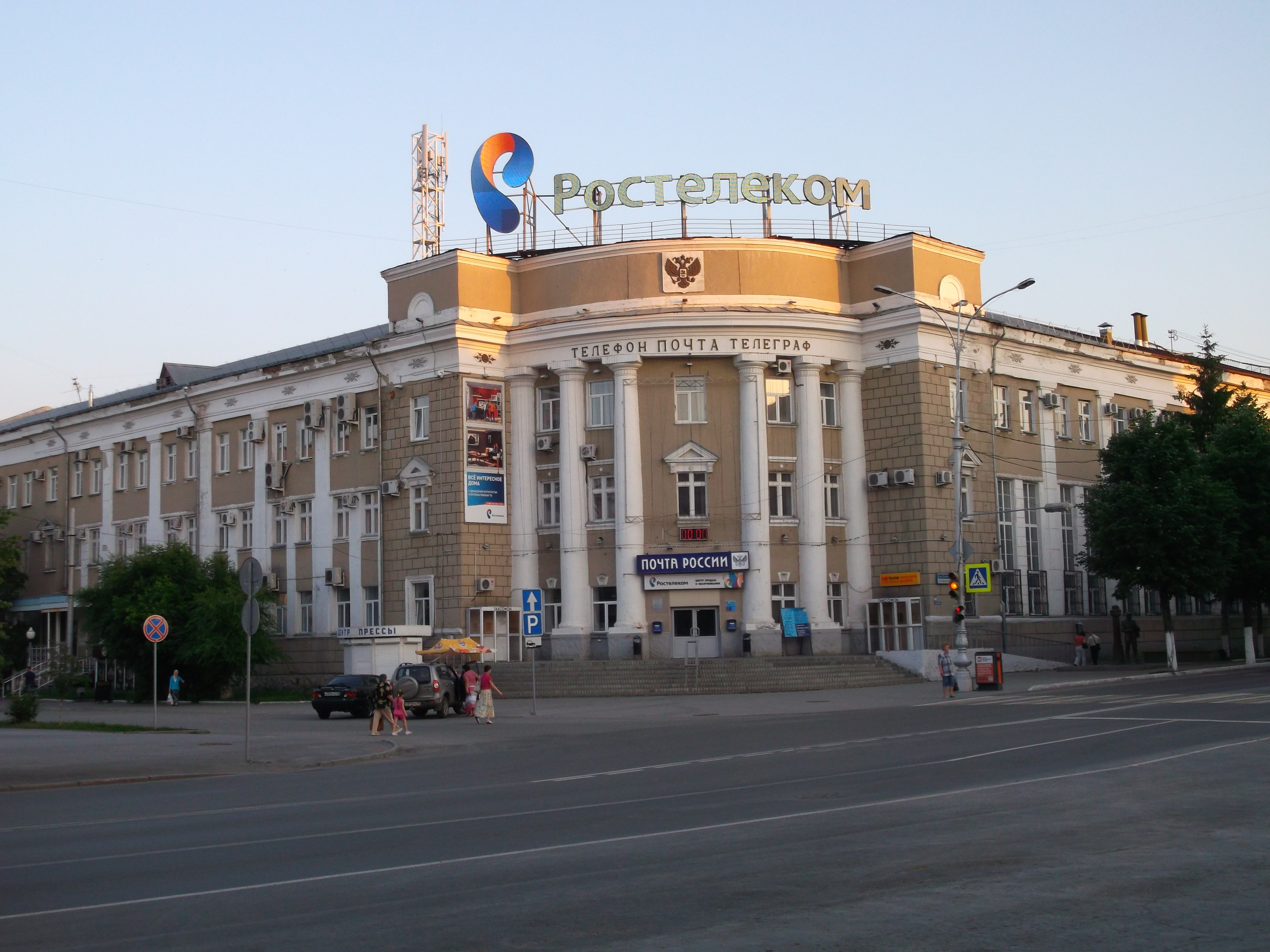
Main post office

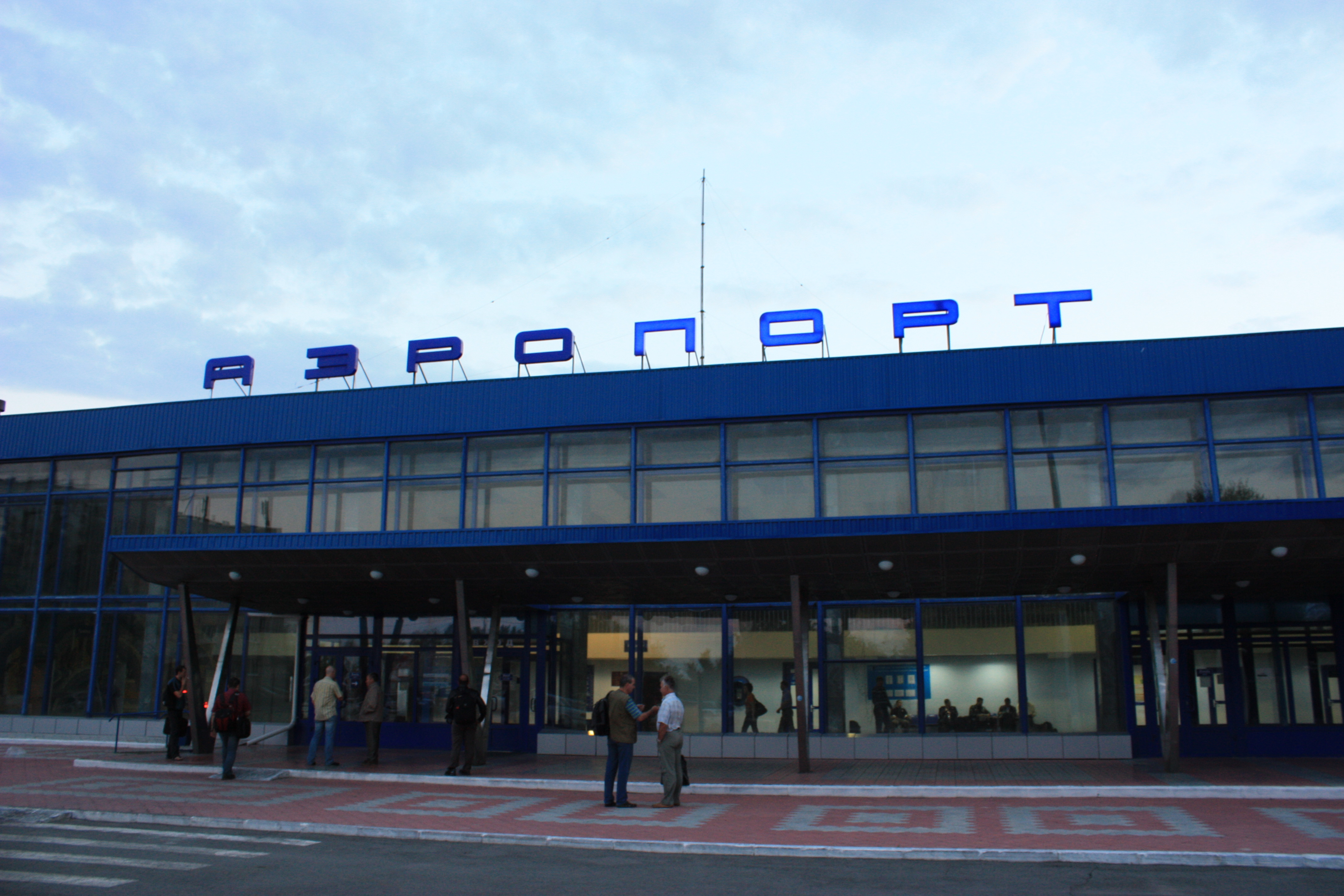
Kurgan Airport

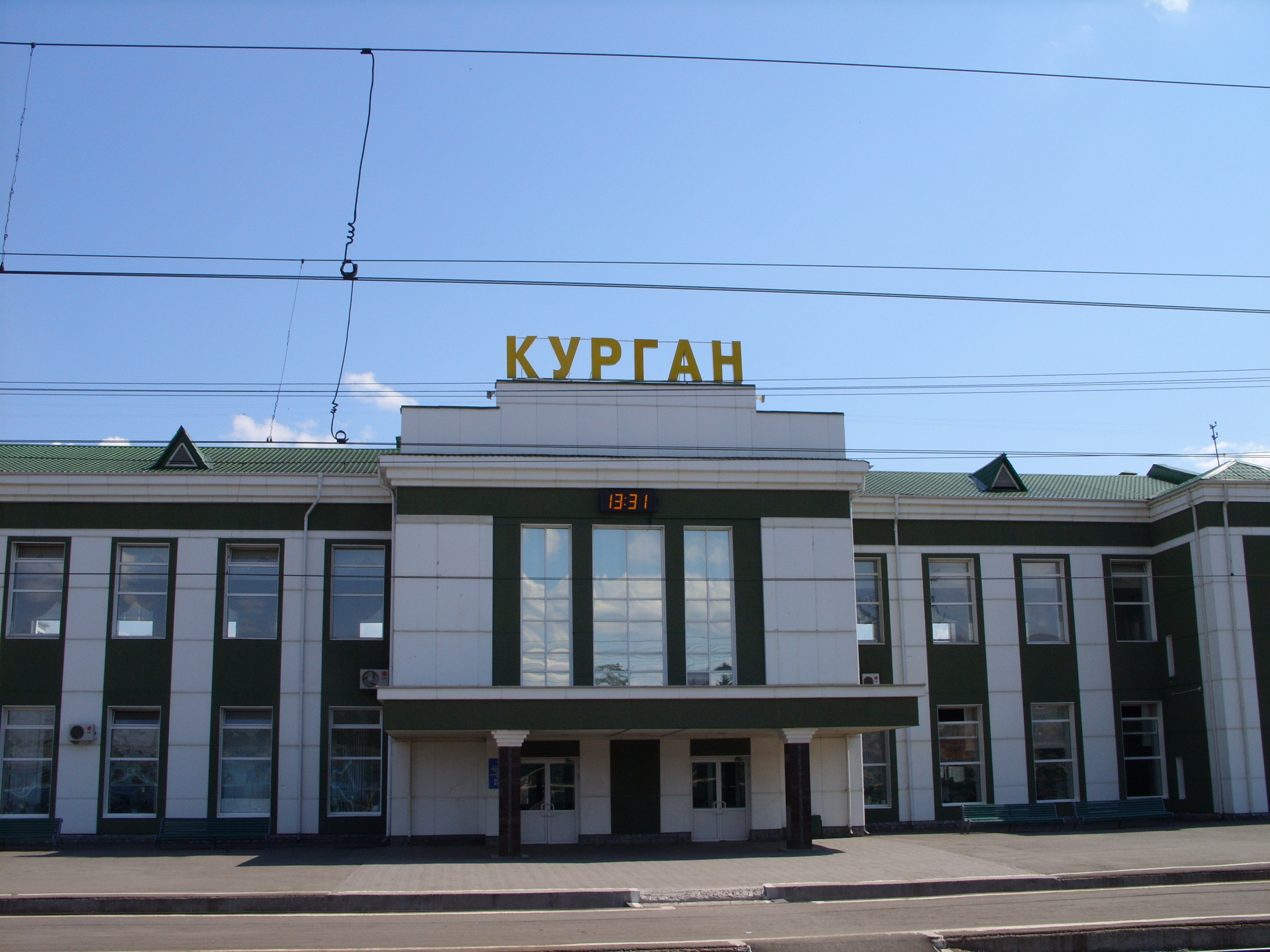
Railway station

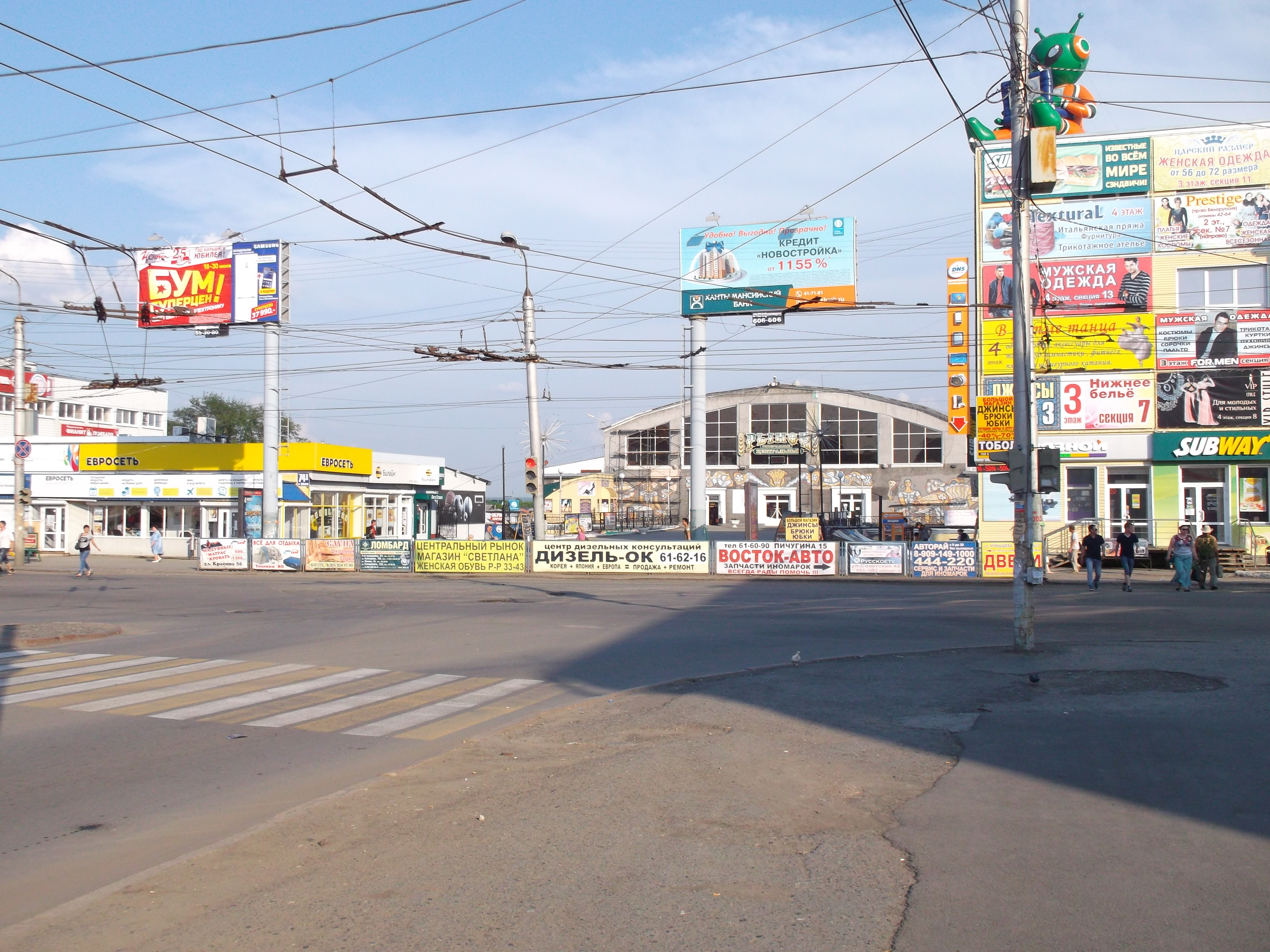
Central market

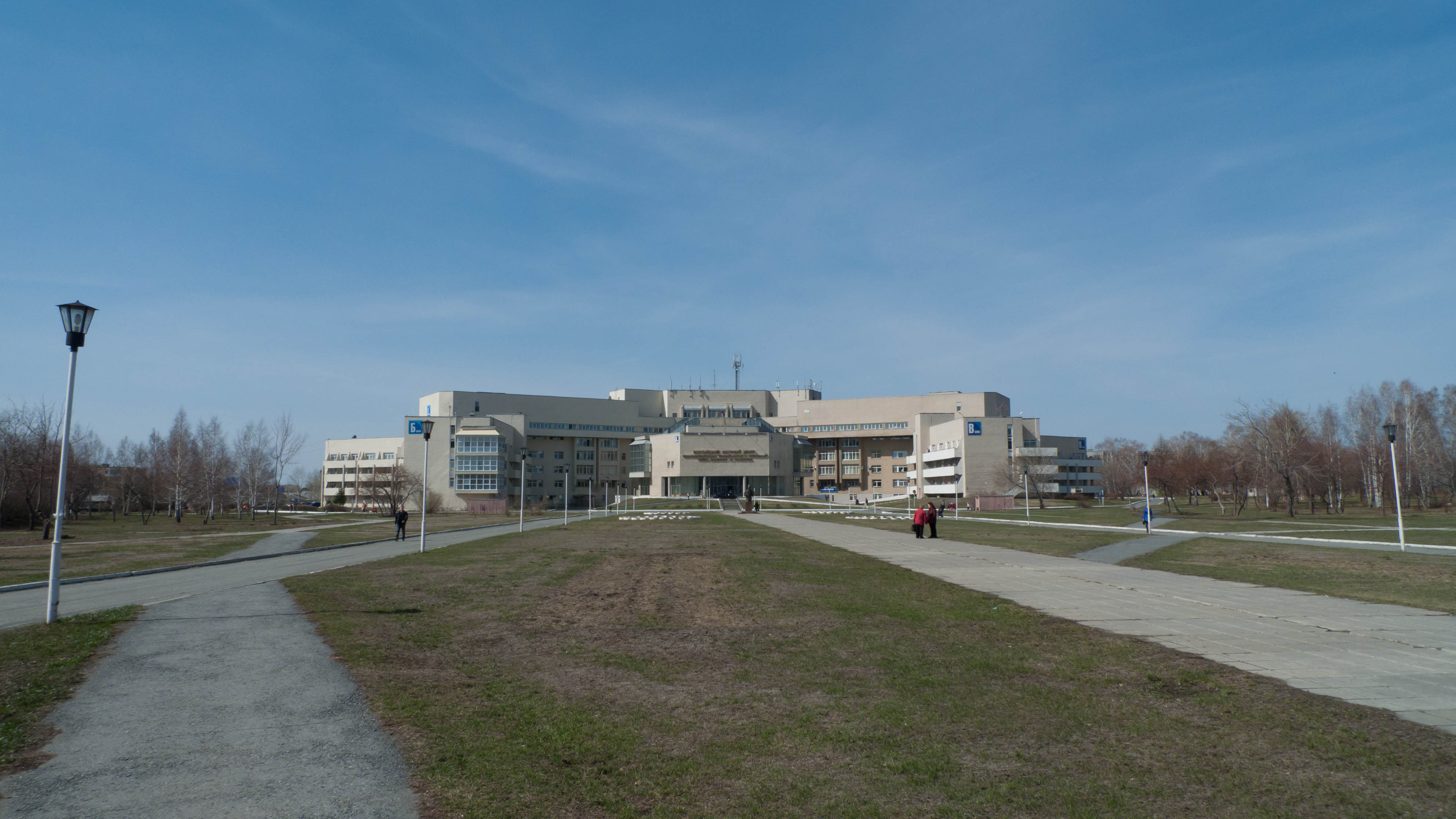
Russian Ilizarov Scientific Center for Restorative Traumatology and Orthopaedics

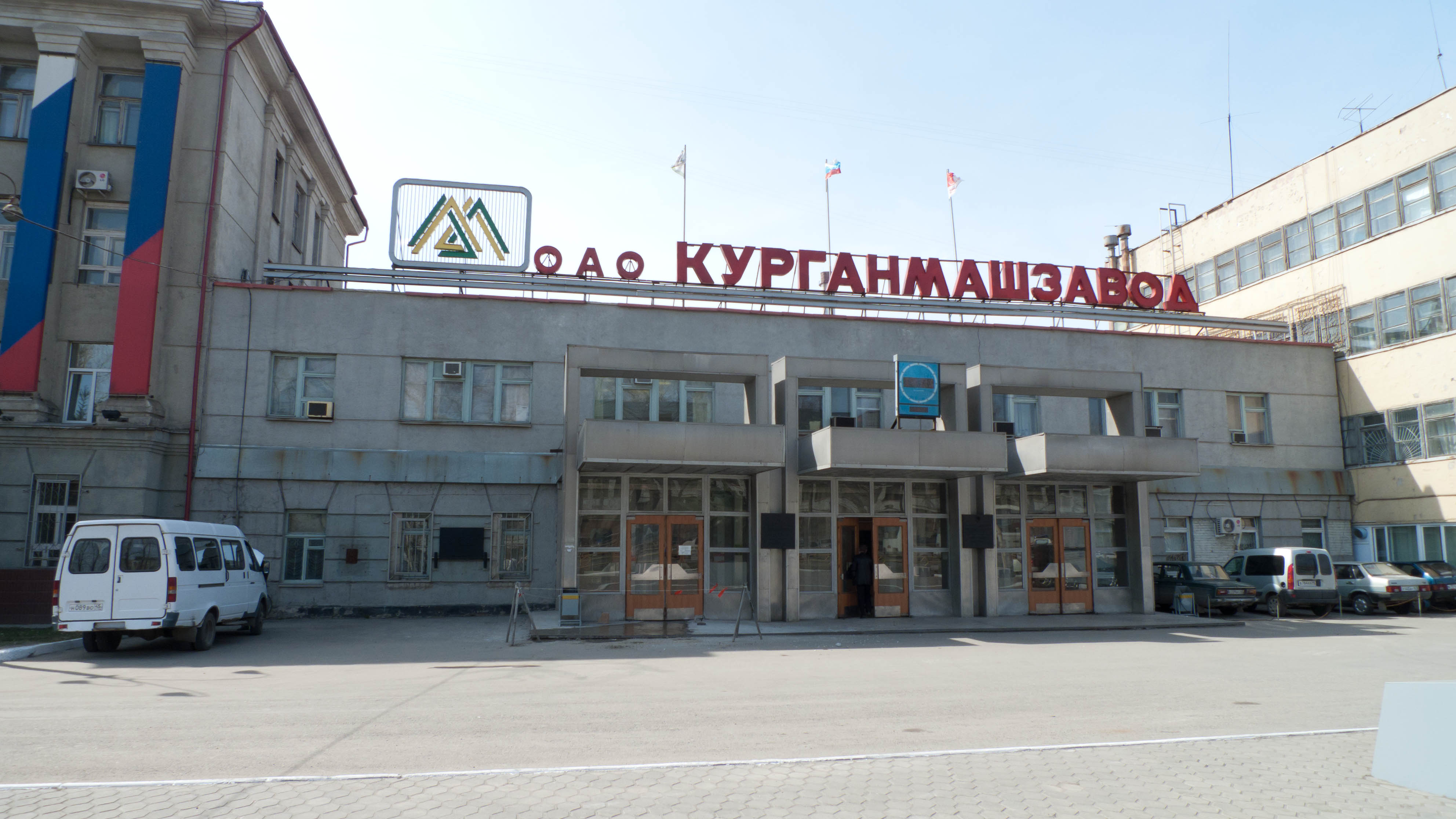
Kurganmashzavod

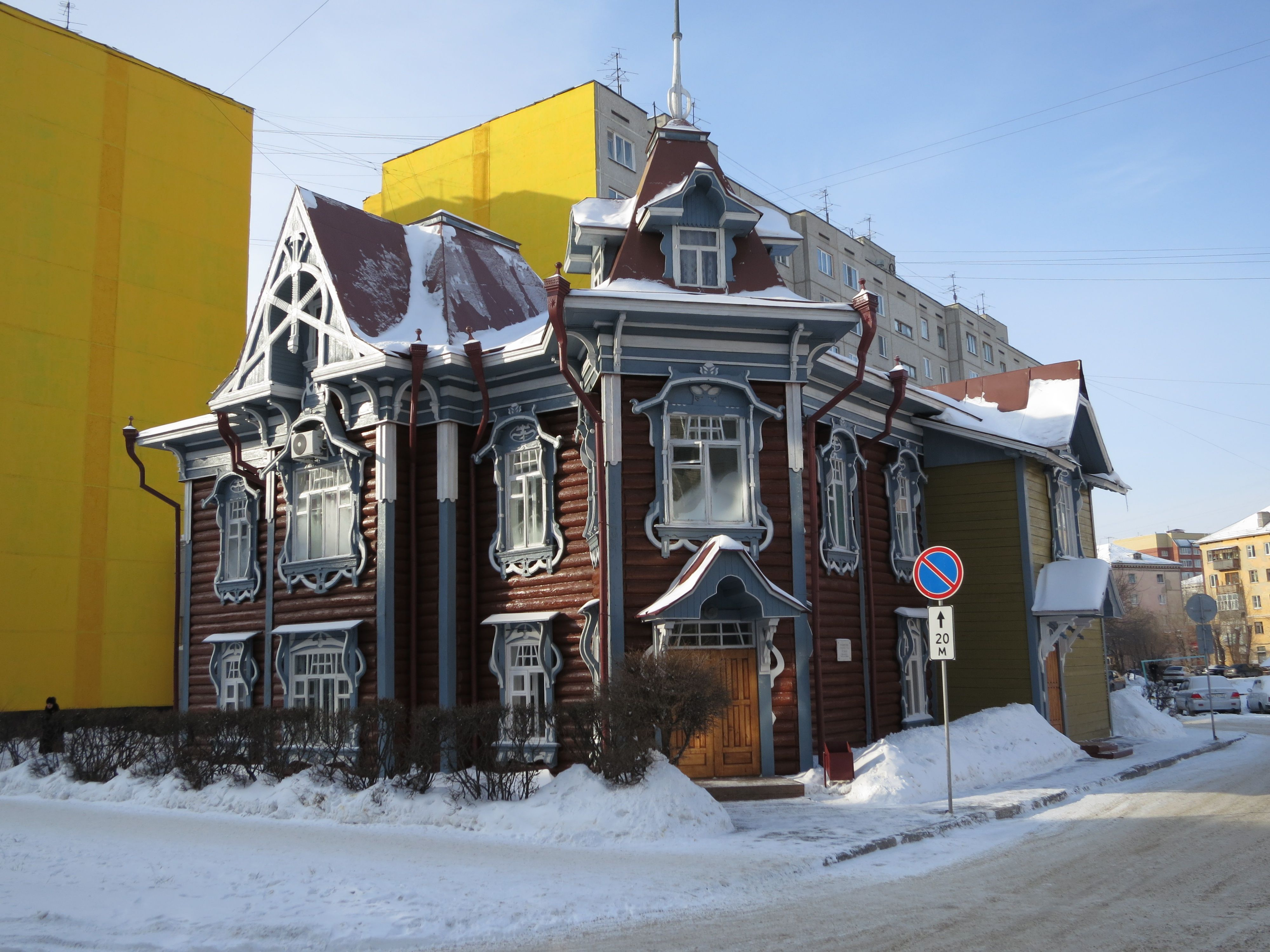
City center of culture and leisure

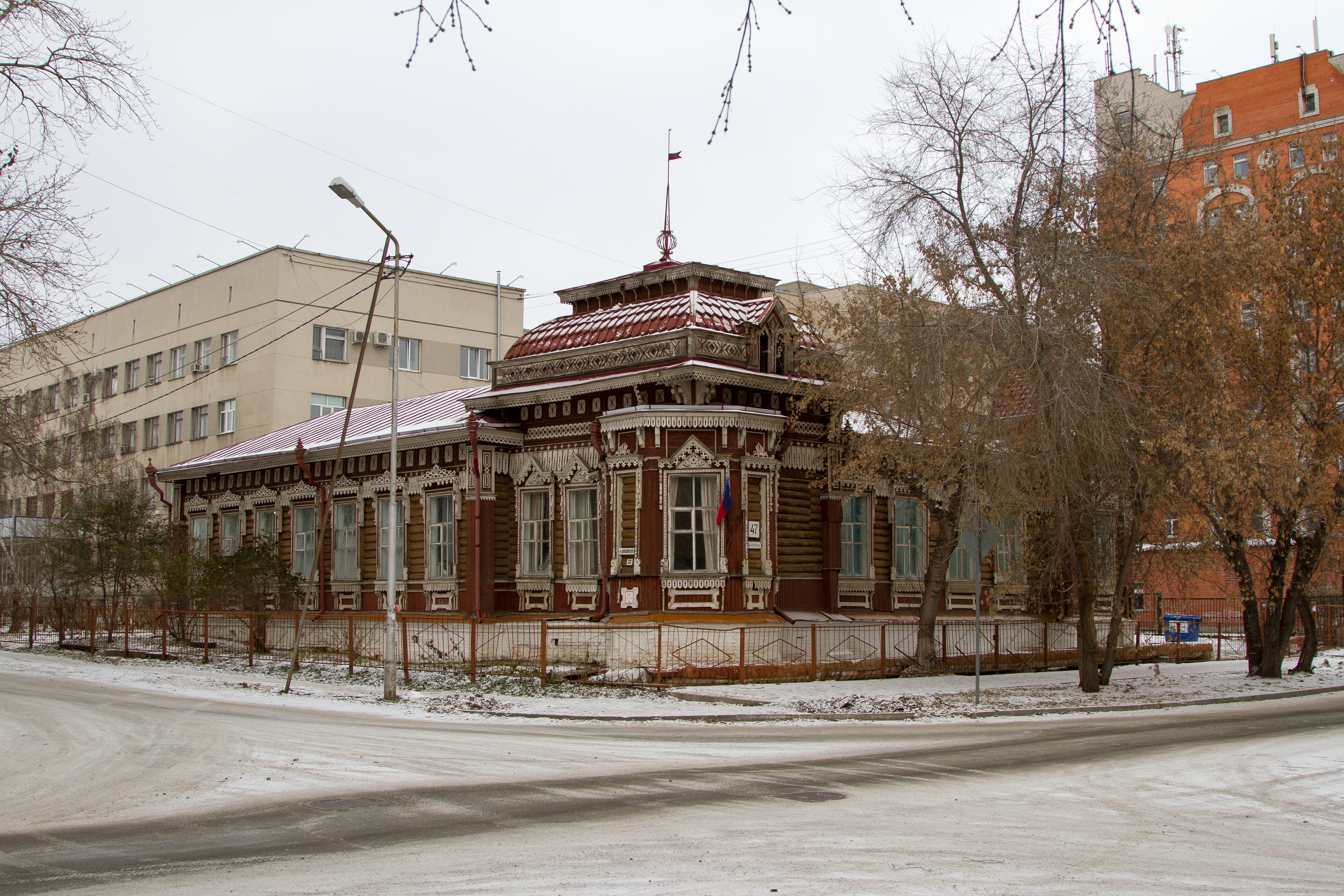
Children's art school

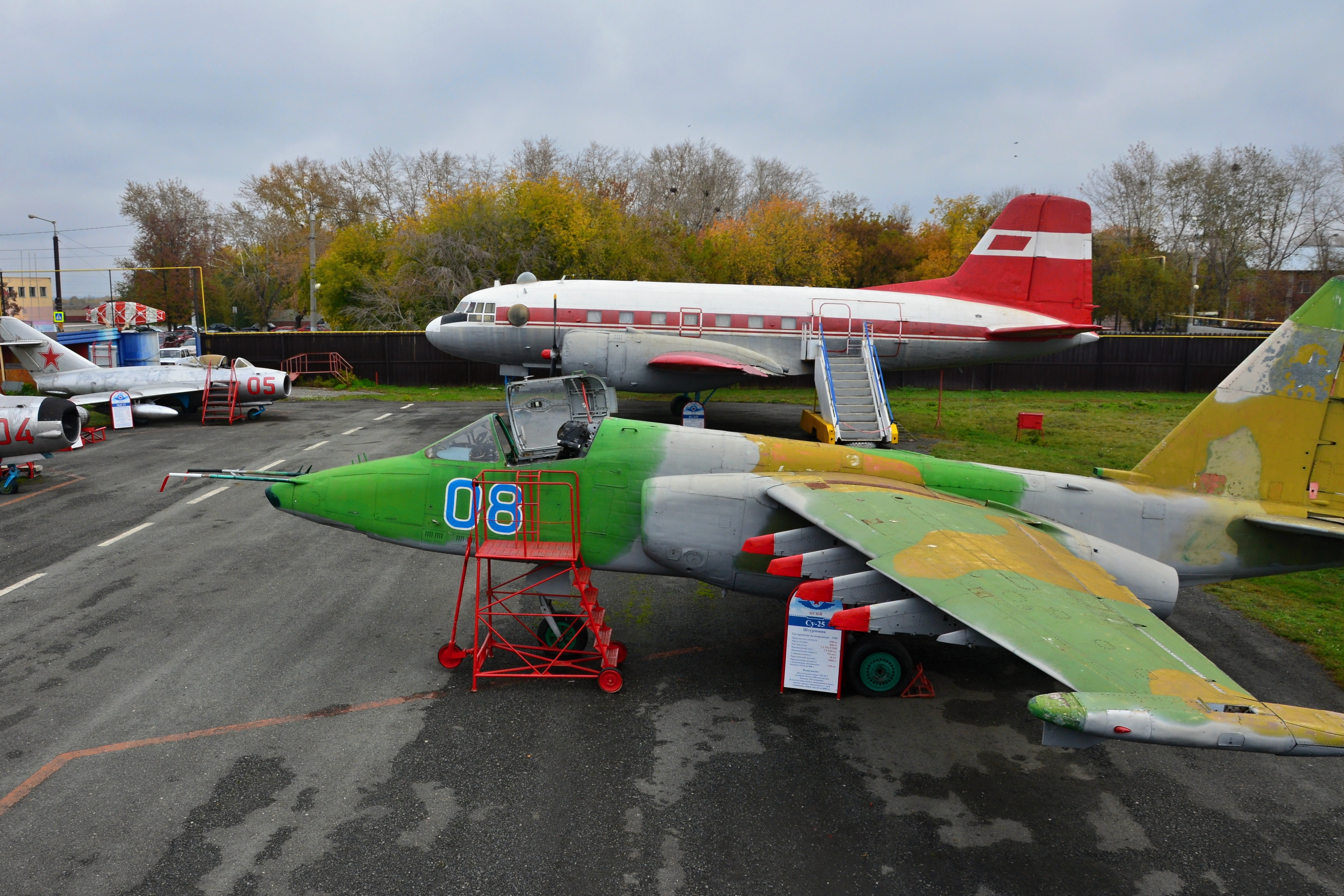
Kurgan Aviation Museum

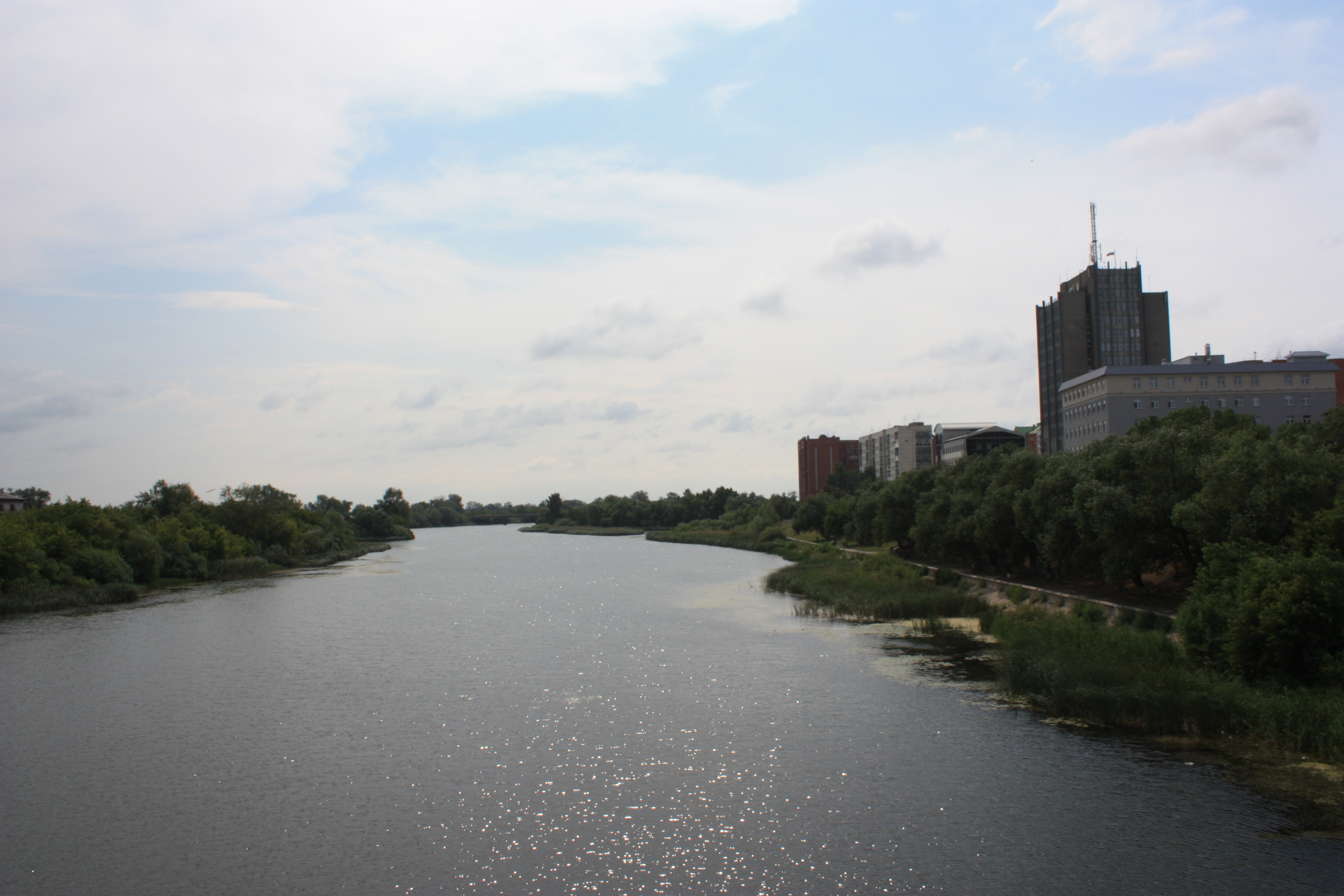
River Tobol

== Notable people ==
- Oleg Bogomolov (born 1950), governor of Kurgan Oblast
- Dmitri Bushmanov (born 1978), association football player
- Maxim Fadeev (born 1968), singer-songwriter, composer and producer
- Yuri Galtsev (born 1961), Honored Artist of the Russian Federation
- Gavriil Ilizarov (1921–1992), physician, known for inventing the Ilizarov apparatus for lengthening limb bones
- Vyacheslav Kamoltsev (born 1971), association football player
- Larisa Korobeynikova (born 1987), fencer
- Evgeni Krasilnikov (1965–2014), volleyball player
- Leonid Krasin (1870–1926), politician and diplomat
- Ivan Kurpishev (born 1969), powerlifter
- Dmitri Loskov (born 1974), association football player
- Aleksey Markovsky (born 1957), swimmer
- Aleksandr Menshchikov (born 1973), wrestler
- Yana Romanova (born 1983), biathlete
- Sergei Rublevsky (born 1974), chess grandmaster
- Yulia Savicheva (born 1987), singer
- Alexander Solonik (1960–1997), Russian mobster and hitman
- Elena Temnikova (born 1985), singer
- Sergei Teryayev (born 1994), professional ice hockey defenceman
- Alexander Vinogradov (1930–2011), journalist and writer
- Sergey Vinogradov (1958–2010), journalist, translator, and writer
- Sergei Yakovlev (1925–1996), actor
- Mikhail Znamensky (1833–1892), writer, memoirist, painter, caricaturist, archeologist and ethnographer
- Vitaly Goryaev (1910–1982), painter, graphic illustrator, caricaturist
- Evgeny Yaroslavlev (born 1994), professional ice hockey player

== International relations ==
=== Twin towns and sister cities ===
Kurgan is twinned with:

- Appleton, United States
- Rufina, Italy
