= Kurgan State University =

- Курганский государственный университет
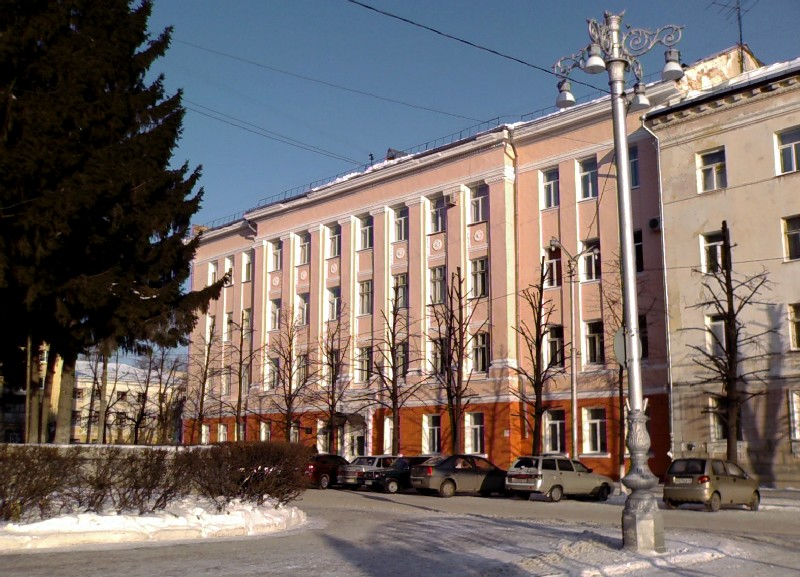
- Established: 1995
- Head: Ерихов, Михаил Максович
- Location: Kurgan, Kurgan Oblast, Russia; 55.4367°N 65.3328°E
- Website: kgsu.ru

Kurgan State University (Russian: Курганский государственный университет) is a university in Kurgan, Kurgan Oblast of Russia. It was established in 1995 in accordance with presidential decree No. 990 on 30 September 1995, merging the Kurgan Engineering Institute, dating from 1959, with the Kurgan State Pedagogical Institute, dating from 1951. The university prepares students in humanitarian, socio-economic and technical specialties.
