= Evgeny Yaroslavlev =

Russian ice hockey player

- Born: April 6, 1994 (age 32) Kurgan, Russia
- Height: 5 ft 11 in (180 cm)
- Weight: 159 lb (72 kg; 11 st 5 lb)
- Position: Goaltender
- VHL team: Zauralue Kurgan
- Playing career: 2013–present

Evgeny Yaroslavlev (born April 6, 1994) is a Russian professional ice hockey goaltender. He is currently playing with Ak Bars Kazan of the Kontinental Hockey League (KHL) Yaroslavlev made his Kontinental Hockey League debut playing with Zauralue Kurgan during the 2013–14 season.
