= Sergei Vinogradov (journalist) =

Sergei Aleksandrovich Vinogradov
- Сергей Александрович Виноградов
- Born: April 16, 1958; Kurgan, Kurgan Oblast, RSFSR, USSR
- Died: December 16, 2010 (aged 52); Carouge, Geneva, Switzerland

Sergei Aleksandrovich Vinogradov (April 16, 1958 – December 16, 2010) was a Russian journalist, translator and writer. He worked for the UN from 1986 until his death.

Sergei Vinogradov was born in Kurgan, Kurgan Oblast, Russian SFSR in 1958. In 1960, however, he moved to Moscow with his family as his father was promoted to a new position there. He attended school from 1965 to 1975 and was involved in school bands during his senior years (playing the guitar). From 1975 to 1980, Sergey Vinogradov studied international journalism at the Moscow State Institute of International Relations. Upon graduation, he received a job at the International Life (Mezhdunarodnaya Zhizn) magazine.

Apart from writing articles for the magazine, Vinogradov also wrote short stories which remained unpublished, however (partially due to their critical tone towards the Soviet authorities). In 1985, he was able to get enrolled in the UN translation courses. Upon completion, he passed the final exams and became a UN translator in New York City.

Soon after his arrival to New York City, he was nearly killed in a car accident (as a passenger). However, upon his recovery, he resumed his work as a translator. In 1990, he was transferred to the Department of Political and Security Council Affairs as a Political Affairs Officer and in 1991 began writing for the UN Chronicle (as a member of the Department of Public Information). In 1997, he briefly returned to Moscow to work for the local United Nations Information Center. In December 1997, he came back to New York. In 1999, he became an Information Officer for the UNMIK and lived in Pristina for three years. In 2002, he moved to the UN Office at Geneva, where he once again became a translator (translating from English to Russian).

During his tenure at the UN, Sergey Vinogradov continued writing short stories and also started writing longer novels. One of the novels, Sealed-up Hell (Запломбированный Ад), along with several short stories, was published in 2006. He wrote another novel, Heavenly Seedlings (Райская Рассада), but it remained unpublished. He began working on a third novel, provisionally titled A History of Time Travel, but it remained unfinished.

Sergey Vinogradov was married twice; his first marriage ended with divorce, while his second marriage ended with his death. He had a son from his first marriage.

In June 2010, he was diagnosed with pancreatic cancer and began a course of chemotherapy, which was ultimately unsuccessful as the cancer had metastasized to his liver. He died on December 16, 2010, in Carouge, Geneva, Switzerland.
