= Kurgan West =

- IATA: none; ICAO: none

Summary
- Airport type: Abandoned
- Operator: Soviet Air Force
- Location: Kurgan
- Elevation AMSL: 499 ft / 152 m
- Coordinates: 55°24′24″N 064°56′30″E
- Interactive map of Kurgan West

Runways
Direction	Length		Surface
Direction	ft	m	Surface
	9,104	2,775

Kurgan West was an air base in Russia located 25 km west of Kurgan. It was probably active during the 1950s and 1960s and is now abandoned; the remnants are almost completely gone.
