= Dmitri Bushmanov =

Russian footballer

Personal information
- Full name: Dmitri Vladimirovich Bushmanov
- Date of birth: 30 September 1978 (age 48)
- Place of birth: Kurgan, Russian SFSR, USSR
- Height: 1.72 m (5 ft 8 in)
- Position: Midfielder

Youth career
- DYuSSh-3 Kurgan

Senior career*
Years	Team	Apps	(Gls)
1996–1997	FC Sibir Kurgan	24	(4)
1997–1998	FC Tyumen	17	(1)
1998	FC Zhemchuzhina Sochi	2	(0)
1999	FC Torpedo-ZIL Moscow	2	(0)
1999	FC Dynamo Stavropol	6	(0)
2001–2002	FC Tyumen	48	(6)
2003	FC Ural Yekaterinburg	21	(1)
2003–2005	FC Tobol Kurgan	74	(23)
2006–2008	FC Zenit Chelyabinsk	76	(20)
2009	FC Tyumen	13	(2)
- * Club domestic league appearances and goals

Dmitri Vladimirovich Bushmanov (Russian: Дмитрий Владимирович Бушманов; born 30 September 1978) is a former Russian professional footballer.

== Club career ==
He made his debut in the Russian Premier League in 1997 for FC Tyumen.
