= Alexander Solonik =

Russian mafia hitman (1960–1997)

- Alexander Solonik, photo appeared on Russian television, soon after the news about his death surfaced
- Born: Alexander Viktorovich Solonik; 16 October 1960; Kurgan, RSFSR, Soviet Union
- Died: 31 January 1997 (aged 36) (Note: Solonik's solicitor Valeriy Karyshev, who attended the police identification and burial, said that the dead man had little similarity with his former client. Solonik's mother, who identified the corpse as her son's body, did not attend the funeral.); Athens, Greece
- Cause of death: Strangulation
- Other names: Sasha Macedonian, Valerianych, Superkiller
- Occupation: Contract killer
- Allegiance: Kurganskaya criminal group
- Convictions: Murder, rape

Alexander Viktorovich Solonik (Russian: Алекса́ндр Ви́кторович Соло́ник; 16 October 1960 – 31 January 1997) was a Russian gangster, known for his reputation as a notorious hitman in the Russian criminal underworld. Also known as Sasha-Macedonian, (Note: A reference to ability to shoot handguns from both hands, in Russian called a Macedonian shooting (Russian: Стрельба по-македонски)) Alexander the Great and Superkiller, Solonik was involved in Russian Mob activity for much of the 1990s until disappearing after his second escape from prison. Solonik was found dead in Athens, Greece, in 1997.

== Early life and education ==
Alexander Viktorovich Solonik was born on 16 October 1960, in Kurgan, Soviet Union. As a child he showed great interest in freestyle wrestling and firearms. In his youth Sononik lived in the same neighbourhood as Andrei Kolegov, who would become one of the leaders of the Kurgan criminal organization. Solonik and Kolegov were friends, which was one of the factors why Alexander had joined the gang in the future. When finishing school, Solonik was conscripted into the Soviet Army and was assigned to a tank regiment, a part of the group of Soviet forces in Germany. After his conscription ended, Solonik served as a patrolman in MVD and eventually received training at the Gorkovskiy Institute. However, after six months he was expelled for discrediting the rank of police officer, and upon returning home, Solonik obtained a job as a gravedigger at the Kurgan cemetery. His colleagues at the cemetery were Andrei Kolegov, Oleg Nelubin and Vitaliy Ignatov, who in the near future will become the leaders of the Kurgan criminal organization. Soon after returning to Kurgan he married, and his wife gave birth to a daughter, but they eventually divorced. Solonik married another woman with whom he had a son, and in 1987 he was charged with rape and sentenced to eight years in prison. Andrei Kolegov was one of the witnesses at the trial who testified that Solonik was innocent. During a farewell meeting with his wife before he was imprisoned, Solonik escaped by jumping from the second floor of the building. After several months he was apprehended 120 miles (190 km) north of Kurgan, and taken to the prison.

== Criminal career ==
In prison Solonik was designated to solitary confinement because he served on active duty and had some police training, but later was transferred to serve his prison sentence among the other prisoners. When it became known to the other inmates that Solonik had worked for the police, he was marked for death. According to rumour, Solonik defended himself against as many as 12 inmates at a time, earning the respect of his fellow prisoners. After two years of imprisonment, he escaped again.

Solonik went back home to Kurgan, joined the local criminal organization, and started work as a hitman. Solonik's first target, the leader of a rival organization, was murdered in 1990 in Tyumen. After this hit, Solonik went to Moscow with other members of the Kurgan organization to seek work. In 1992, Solonik assassinated Russian "thief in law" Viktor Nikiforov, and six months later he murdered another important Russian Mob boss. This time the victim was thief-in-law Valeri Dlugatsj, who was shot in a crowded nightclub even though he was surrounded by bodyguards. In 1994, Solonik eliminated Vladislav Vinner, Dlugatsj's replacement. It was reported that in 1994, Solonik tried to extort money from another Russian mobster, who made a phone call to settle the extortion. Solonik immediately identified him as Otari Kvantrishvili, one of the most powerful mobsters in Russia. Apparently, Solonik was unable to extort money from Kvantrishvili, and several weeks later murdered him in revenge. However, the story is doubtful as other people from a gang unrelated to Solonik were convicted in 2008 for Kvantrishvili's murder, and rumours spread that he was supported by Chechen groups. In fact, Otari Kvantrishvili had been murdered by an Orekhovskaya gang hitman, Alexei Sherstobitov ("Lesha Soldat"), who confessed in this crime after he was captured in 2006. Solonik was confessing all the crimes he knew about, even the ones he was not part of, because wanted the FSB to investigate his case. He was afraid to be transferred from an FSB prison to a regular prison, where inmates who were associated with Nikiforov, Vinner and Dlugatsj could easily kill him. Thus, Solonik was just playing for time, waiting for his friends on the outside to break him out of the prison.

By this time, Solonik had become infamous among the criminal underworld and law enforcement figures in Russia. Law enforcement took a special interest, and made several attempts to catch him. Solonik and a fellow criminal were apprehended by Moscow police when they were having a drink at a marketplace, but the police failed to search Solonik thoroughly, and he opened fire in the police station with a Glock 17 which he concealed under a raincoat. Three policemen were hit and Solonik ran outside, where he shot two more police officers. Solonik was also shot and cornered, but managed to hold back the officers. Eventually he was overpowered and surrendered, then was sent to the Moscow Matrosskaya Tishina prison, where he underwent an operation to remove a bullet from his kidney. In 1995, Solonik escaped prison yet again when his jailer, Sergey Menshikov, rumoured to be a mob sleeper agent, provided him with a pistol and climbing equipment. Having placed a mannequin under the blanket of his bed to delay pursuit, Solonik escaped using the climbing equipment to rappel down from the prison roof. This time Solonik had very few hiding places in Russia, as his name and face were known to the authorities and general public, but he managed to disappear without being re-apprehended.

Eventually, Solonik surfaced in Greece with a fake passport, which he secured from the Greek consulate in Moscow. In Greece, Solonik set up his own organization of around 50 men, which dealt in drug smuggling and contract killings, and bought several villas in an Athens suburb. Solonik's reputation now grew to legendary proportions with the public, and he was featured in Russia's top ten "most wanted" list.

== Death ==
On 31 January 1997 Russian hitman and ex-marine Alexander Pustovalov ("Sasha Soldat") strangled Alexander Solonik to death in Solonik's villa. In February 1997, Greek newspapers published articles that claimed a Russian Mob boss had been found dead 15 miles (24 km) from Athens. The body of the mobster was found and had no identification documents, though the authorities nevertheless identified the body as Alexander Solonik. In the weeks after Solonik's body was found, Greek authorities raided the villas belonging to Solonik's organization and found an arsenal of weapons. They also discovered that Solonik had been hired to carry out a hit in Italy before his death. Vladimir Tatarenkov (Russian: Владимир Татаренков), who said that an investigation of Anatoly Bykov needed Solonik as a witness, disputed this.

== See also ==
- List of prison escapes
