= Ivan Kurpishev =

Russian powerlifter (born 1969)

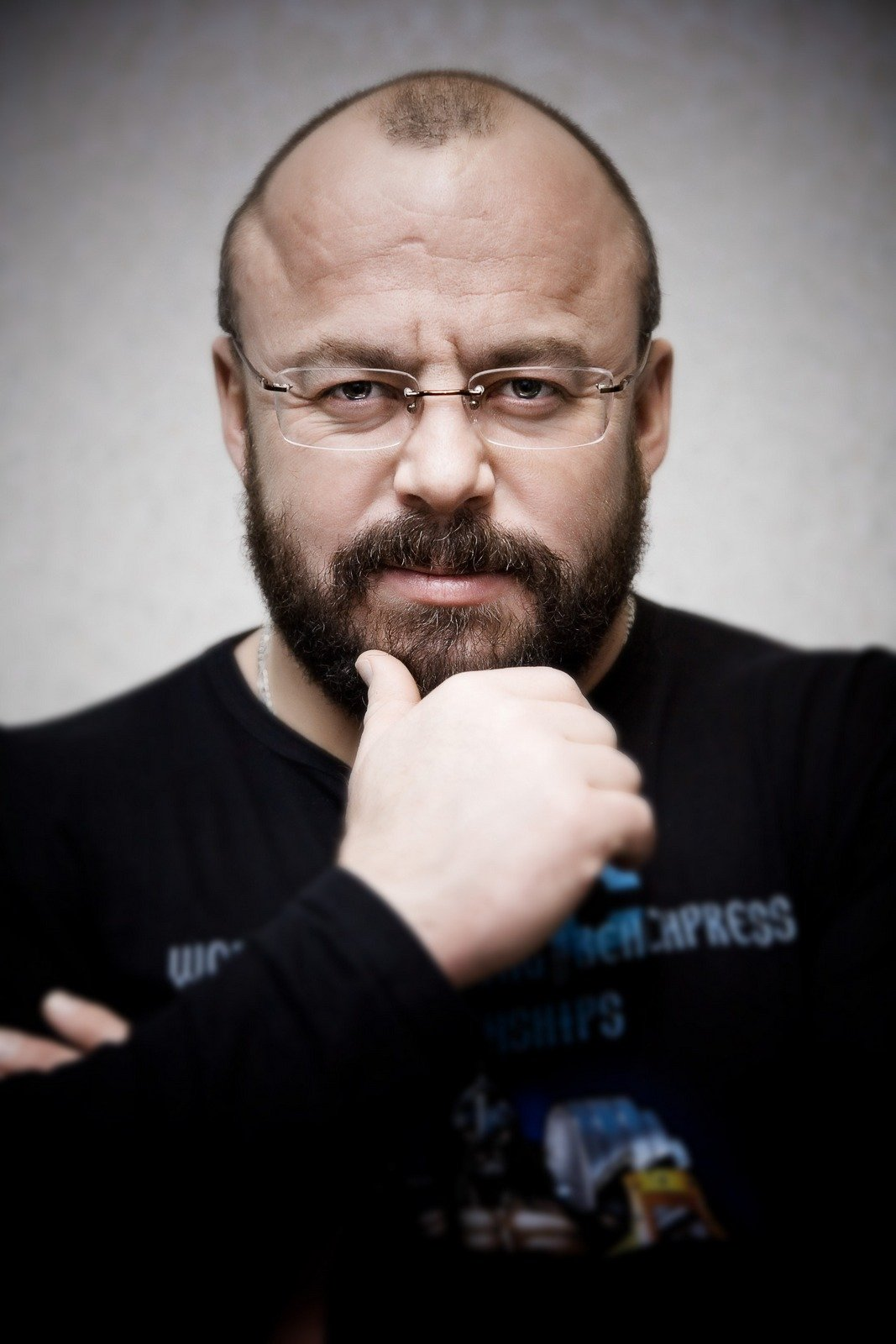

Personal information
- Full name: Ivan Borisovich Kurpishev
- Nationality: Russia
- Born: 2 February 1969 (age 57) Kurgan, Russian SFSR, Soviet Union
- Height: 1.73 m (5 ft 8 in)
- Weight: 110 kg (240 lb)

Sport
- Country: Russia
- Sport: Powerlifting, Bench press
- Event(s): Bench press, Squat, Deadlift

Ivan Borisovich Kurpishev (Russian: Иван Борисович Курпишев, ISO 9: Ivan Borisovič Kurpišev; born 2 March 1969 in Kurgan) is a Russian powerlifter.
