= 2024 Kurgan Oblast gubernatorial election =

- 8 September 2024
- Turnout: 42.47%
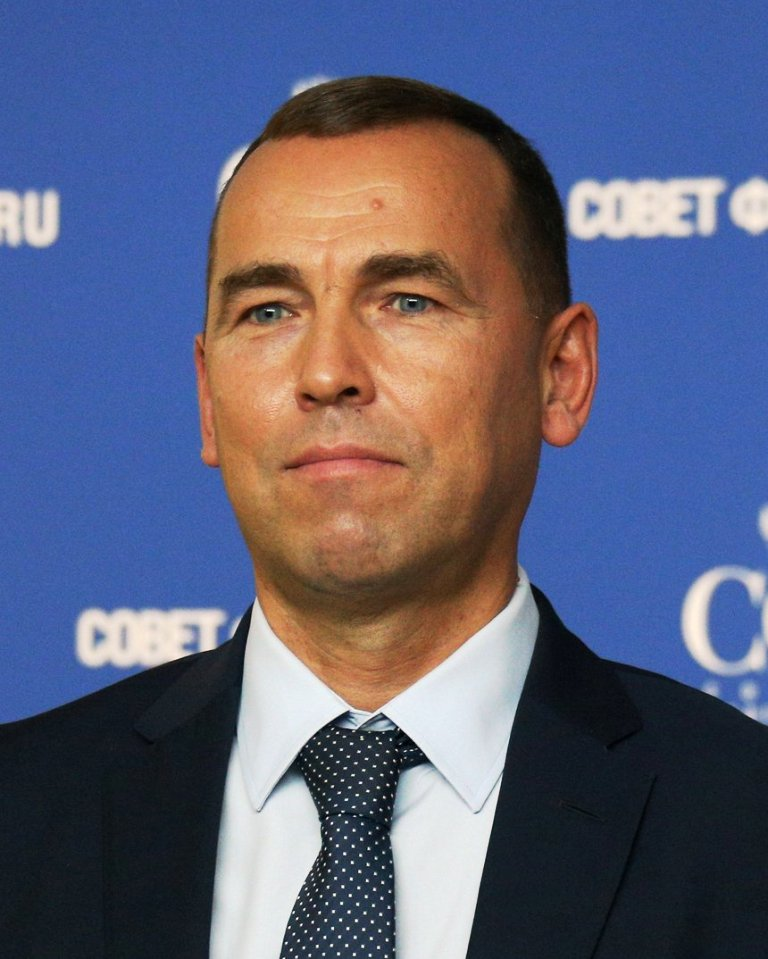
		LDPR
Candidate	Vadim Shumkov	Olga Druzhinina
Party	United Russia	LDPR
Popular vote	231,940	14,948
Percentage	85.17%	5.49%
Governor before election
Vadim Shumkov
Independent
Governor-elect
Vadim Shumkov
United Russia

The 2024 Kurgan Oblast gubernatorial election took place on 8 September 2024, on common election day. Incumbent Governor Vadim Shumkov was re-elected to a second term in office.

== Background ==
Then-Deputy Governor of Tyumen Oblast Vadim Shumkov was appointed acting Governor of Kurgan Oblast in October 2018, replacing first-term Governor Aleksey Kokorin, who resigned at his own request. After his resignation Kokorin joined the board of directors of ARMZ Uranium Holding, a uranium mining division of Rosatom corporation.

Shumkov ran for a full term as an independent and overwhelmingly won the September 2019 election with 80.86% of the vote, as his nearest challenger, Yakov Sidorov (CPRF), received just 9.70%. During the campaign analysts in May 2019 named Shumkov "tough and uncompromising anti-crisis manager" and "the toughest acting governor running that cycle".

In May 2024 during a meeting with President Vladimir Putin Governor Shumkov announced his intention to run for a second term and received Putin's endorsement.

== Candidates ==
In Kurgan Oblast candidates for Governor can be nominated by registered political parties or by self-nomination. Candidate for Governor of Kurgan Oblast should be a Russian citizen and at least 30 years old. Candidates for Governor should not have a foreign citizenship or residence permit. Each candidate in order to be registered is required to collect at least 5% of signatures of members and heads of municipalities. In addition, self-nominated candidates should collect 0.5% of signatures of Kurgan Oblast residents (3,277–3,604 signatures). Also gubernatorial candidates present 3 candidacies to the Federation Council and election winner later appoints one of the presented candidates.

=== Declared ===
Candidate name, political party		Occupation	Status	Ref.
Valery Derzhavin; SR–ZP		Member of Kurgan City Duma (2019–present); Businessman	Registered	
Olga Druzhinina; Liberal Democratic Party		Member of Kurgan Oblast Duma (2020–present); Businesswoman	Registered	
Yaroslav Klimko; Party of Pensioners		Member of Kurgan Oblast Duma (2020–present); Psychiatrist	Registered	
Vadim Shumkov; United Russia	Vadim Shumkov	Incumbent Governor of Kurgan Oblast (2018–present)	Registered	
Viktor Zyryanov; Communist Party		Member of Kurgan Oblast Duma (2020–present)	Registered	
Pavel Voronin; Independent		Poultry farm worker	Did not file	

=== Declined ===
- Yakov Sidorov (Communists of Russia), Member of Kurgan City Duma (2009–present), 2019 CPRF gubernatorial candidate

=== Candidates for Federation Council ===
Gubernatorial candidate, political party	Candidates for Federation Council	Status
Valery Derzhavin; SR–ZP	* Aleksandr Bukharov, former Member of Shadrinsk City Duma (2015–2020) * Aleksandr Futerman, community activist * Yakov Sidorov, Member of Kurgan City Duma (2009–present), 2019 CPRF gubernatorial candidate	Registered
Olga Druzhinina; Liberal Democratic Party	* Gazimur Muradymov, businessman * Pavel Vagin, businessman * Yury Yarushin, Member of Kurgan Oblast Duma (2004–present), aide to State Duma member Stanislav Naumov, 2019 gubernatorial candidate	Registered
Yaroslav Klimko; Party of Pensioners	* Dmitry Belozerov, brand manager * Yelena Petrova, pensioner * Sergey Rogov, community activist	Registered
Vadim Shumkov; United Russia	* Sergey Gavrin, Deputy Governor of Kurgan Oblast (2023–present) * Yelena Perminova, incumbent Senator (2014–present), Chairwoman of the Council Committee on Social Policy (2023–present) * Konstantin Yermakov, Deputy Governor of Kurgan Oblast (2018–present)	Registered
Viktor Zyryanov; Communist Party	* Anatoly Karasev, pensioner * Larisa Yermolina, businesswoman * Ivan Yevgenov, former Member of Kurgan Oblast Duma (2015–2020), 2014 gubernatorial candidate	Registered

== Finances ==
All sums are in rubles.

Financial Report	Source	Derzhavin	Druzhinina	Klimko	Shumkov	Zyryanov
First		15,000	20,000	20,000	25,020,000	120,000
Final		53,000	1,020,000	220,000	40,020,000	2,120,000

== Results ==
Summary of the 8 September 2024 Kurgan Oblast gubernatorial election results
Candidate	Party	Votes	%
Vadim Shumkov (incumbent)	United Russia	231,940	85.17
Olga Druzhinina	Liberal Democratic Party	14,948	5.49
Viktor Zyryanov	Communist Party	11,890	4.37
Valery Derzhavin	A Just Russia – For Truth	4,787	1.76
Yaroslav Klimko	Party of Pensioners	4,617	1.70
Valid votes		268,182	98.48
Blank ballots		4,139	1.52
Total		272,321	100.00
Turnout		272,321	42.47
Registered voters		641,187	100.00

Governor Shumkov re-appointed incumbent Senator Yelena Perminova (United Russia) to the Federation Council.

== See also ==
- 2024 Russian regional elections
