= Snowden (film) =

2016 film by Oliver Stone

- Theatrical release poster
- Directed by: Oliver Stone
- Screenplay by: Kieran Fitzgerald; Oliver Stone
- Based on: The Snowden Files by Luke Harding; Time of the Octopus by Anatoly Kucherena
- Produced by: Moritz Borman; Eric Kopeloff; Philip Schulz-Deyle; Fernando Sulichin
- Starring: Joseph Gordon-Levitt; Shailene Woodley; Melissa Leo; Zachary Quinto; Tom Wilkinson; Scott Eastwood; Logan Marshall-Green; Timothy Olyphant; Ben Schnetzer; LaKeith Lee Stanfield; Rhys Ifans; Nicolas Cage
- Cinematography: Anthony Dod Mantle
- Edited by: Alex Marquez; Lee Percy
- Music by: Craig Armstrong
- Production companies: Endgame Entertainment; Vendian Entertainment; KrautPack Entertainment
- Distributed by: Open Road Films (United States); Universum Film/Buena Vista International (Germany); Pathé Distribution (France)
- Release dates: July 21, 2016 (San Diego Comic-Con); September 16, 2016 (United States); September 22, 2016 (Germany)
- Running time: 134 minutes
- Countries: France; Germany; United States
- Language: English
- Budget: $40 million
- Box office: $37.3 million

Snowden is a 2016 biographical thriller film directed by Oliver Stone and written by Stone and Kieran Fitzgerald. Based on the books The Snowden Files (2014) by Luke Harding and Time of the Octopus (2015) by Anatoly Kucherena, the film stars Joseph Gordon-Levitt as Edward Snowden, a Central Intelligence Agency (CIA) subcontractor and whistleblower who copied and leaked highly classified information from the National Security Agency (NSA) beginning in 2013. In addition to Gordon-Levitt, the film features an ensemble cast including Shailene Woodley, Melissa Leo, Zachary Quinto, Tom Wilkinson, Scott Eastwood, Logan Marshall-Green, Timothy Olyphant, Ben Schnetzer, LaKeith Lee Stanfield, Rhys Ifans and Nicolas Cage. An international co-production of Germany, France, and the United States, principal photography began on February 16, 2015, in Munich.

Snowden screened at San Diego Comic-Con on July 21, 2016, before premiering at the 2016 Toronto International Film Festival on September 9, 2016. The film was theatrically released in the United States on September 16, 2016, by Open Road Films and on September 22 in Germany. It received mixed reviews from critics, who praised Gordon-Levitt's performance but criticized Stone's direction. It grossed $37.3 million worldwide against its $40 million budget.

== Plot ==
In 2013, Edward Snowden arranges a clandestine meeting in Hong Kong with documentarian Laura Poitras and journalist Glenn Greenwald. They discuss releasing the classified information in the former's possession regarding illegal mass surveillance conducted by the National Security Agency (NSA). Poitras later released a documentary about this meeting titled Citizenfour, which was used in a scene within the film.

In 2004, Snowden is undergoing basic training, having enlisted in the U.S. Army with intentions of matriculating to the Special Forces. He eventually fractures his tibia and is informed that he will be receiving an administrative discharge in the process, but is encouraged to serve his country in other ways. Snowden applies for a position at the Central Intelligence Agency (CIA) and subsequently undergoes the screening process. Initially, his answers to the screening questions are insufficient, but Deputy Director Corbin O'Brien decides to take a chance on him, in the wake of extraordinary times. Snowden is then brought to "The Hill" where he is educated and tested on cyberwarfare. He learns about the Foreign Intelligence Surveillance Act, which circumvents the Fourth Amendment rights of U.S. citizens by allowing warrant requests to be approved by a panel of judges that are appointed by the Chief Justice. Snowden and his peers are each tasked with building a covert communications network in their hometown, deleting it, and then rebuilding it in eight hours or less, with five hours being the average time taken. Snowden impresses O'Brien when he completes the exercise in 38 minutes.

Meanwhile, Snowden meets Lindsay Mills via a dating website. The two bond, despite sharply contrasting political ideologies. Snowden acquires his first post abroad working with diplomatic cover in Geneva in 2007, taking Mills with him. He meets Gabriel Sol, who has ample experience in electronic surveillance. Snowden begins questioning the ethical implications of their assignment. After his superior decides to set up their target on a DUI charge to coerce information from him, Snowden resigns from the CIA. Snowden later takes a position with the NSA in Japan, initially under the pretense of building a program that would allow the government to back up all critical data from the Middle East in an emergency, a program which he names "Epic Shelter". Snowden learns of the practices the NSA and other U.S. government agencies are using not just in Japan, but in most countries with which the U.S. is currently allied. These plans include planting malware in different computers that manage government, infrastructure, and financial sectors so that, if any allies turn against the US, that country can effectively be shut down in retaliation. The stress associated with the job results in the end of his relationship with Mills, who moves back with her family in Maryland.

Three months later, Snowden has left his post with the NSA and returned to Maryland, where he and Mills resume their relationship, and he takes a position consulting for the CIA. During a hunting trip, O'Brien reveals an operation in Oahu that revolves around counterattacking Chinese hackers. After Snowden is diagnosed with epilepsy, Mills agrees that he should join the operation, believing the environment in Hawaii may be beneficial for his health. Upon beginning his new job in "The Tunnel", Snowden learns that Epic Shelter is actually providing real-time data that assists U.S. drone pilots in launching lethal strikes against terror suspects in Pakistan.

Snowden ultimately becomes disillusioned with what he is a part of. It culminates in Snowden smuggling a microSD card into his office by way of a Rubik's Cube, and loading all relevant data. He then tells his colleagues he is feeling ill and departs. He advises Mills to fly home to Maryland, after which he contacts Poitras and Greenwald to schedule the meeting. With the help of journalist Ewen MacAskill, the information is disseminated to the press on June 5, 2013, with additional leaks published in the following days. In the aftermath, with the help of MacAskill, Greenwald and Poitras, Snowden is smuggled out of Hong Kong on a flight bound for Latin America via Russia. However, the U.S. government revokes his passport, forcing him to remain in Moscow indefinitely. He is eventually granted asylum for three years, with Mills joining him at a later date. In a remote interview expressing his activism, Snowden states that he is willing to face a court in the US if he is guaranteed a fair trial. Credit sequences showcase news headlines and interviews detailing the consequences of Snowden's actions in Congress, leading to broad reforms in the United States.

== Cast ==
- Joseph Gordon-Levitt as Edward Snowden
  - Edward Snowden briefly portrays himself in a cameo
- Shailene Woodley as Lindsay Mills
- Melissa Leo as Laura Poitras
- Zachary Quinto as Glenn Greenwald
- Tom Wilkinson as Ewen MacAskill
- Scott Eastwood as Trevor James
- Logan Marshall-Green as Drone Pilot/"Catfish"
- Timothy Olyphant as CIA officer Geneva
- Ben Schnetzer as Gabriel Sol
- LaKeith Lee Stanfield as Patrick Haynes
- Rhys Ifans as Corbin O’Brian
- Nicolas Cage as Hank Forrester
- Joely Richardson as Janine Gibson
- Robert Firth as Dr. Stillwell
- Ben Chaplin as Robert Tibbo

Anatoly Kucherena, Snowden's Russian attorney and the author of the novel Time of the Octopus, on which the screenplay is said to be partly based, plays a Russian diplomat in one of the Geneva scenes.

== Production ==
=== Development ===
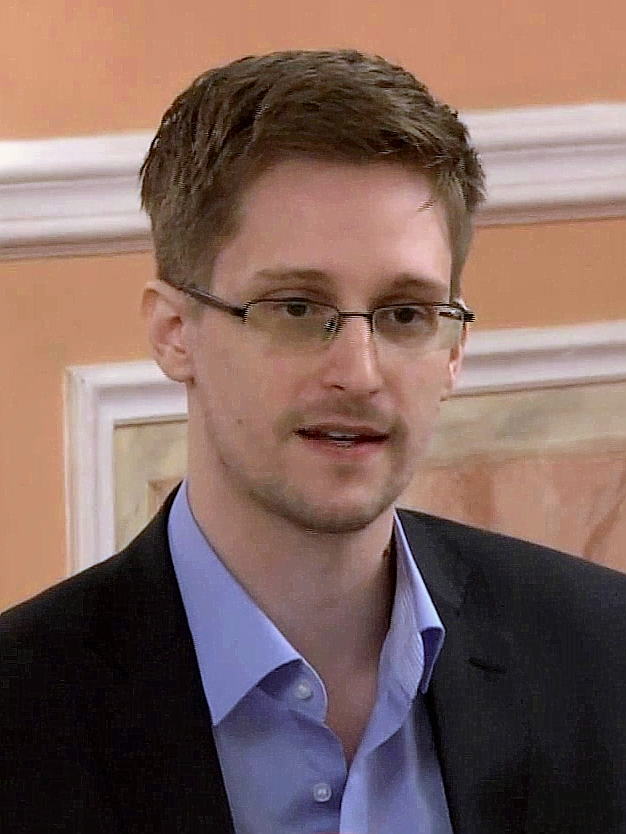
Oliver Stone met Edward Snowden multiple times in Moscow and spent time researching what happened to him.

When Oliver Stone was first approached to helm the film, he was hesitant. At the time, he was working on another controversial subject, about the last few years in the life of Martin Luther King Jr., with Jamie Foxx attached to star, and did not immediately wish to tackle a project as incendiary again. He had been previously criticized for being too apathetic towards George W. Bush – despite calling him the second worst President in U.S. history only after Richard Nixon – in his film, W. (2008). Nonetheless, a series of events and persuasion prompted him to finally agree to direct it. Glenn Greenwald, the journalist who worked with Laura Poitras to break the Snowden story, asked him for some advice; a couple of months later, Snowden's Russian lawyer, Anatoly Kucherena, contacted Stone via his producer asking to meet him. Wanting to sell his book about Snowden, Kucherena arranged a meeting in Moscow, in a secure place that Stone would not reveal. It was a fictional book, but Stone developed an interest in it and called it "very Fyodor Dostoyevsky", in the sense that none of it is realistic. Stone, who did not know if Snowden would cooperate, was undecided whether to make a fictional film with an unnamed character or a story as realistic as possible.

Stone began meeting with Snowden in January 2014. At first, Snowden was wary about the idea of turning his life into a film. Stone went to meet Snowden twice more in late May of that year, and Snowden finally agreed to the idea and even decided to take part. Although he became involved in the project, he was given no script approval, nor did he receive any payment for the film. Payment was instead given to The Guardian. Snowden had seen a piece of Oliver Stone's Untold History of the United States and was fascinated by it. Columbia Pictures already had the rights to Greenwald's book on the case.

On June 2, 2014, it was announced that Stone and Moritz Borman had acquired the rights to the nonfiction book The Snowden Files by Luke Harding, and that Stone would write and direct a film based on it. The film on Martin Luther King Jr. was scrapped since Stone was committed to direct Snowden instead. Eight days later, on June 10, 2014, Stone acquired the rights to another book, Time of the Octopus, by Kucherena. Stone used both books as the sources for his screenplay. On November 6, 2014, Open Road Films acquired the American rights to the film, while Wild Bunch was set to handle foreign sales. Deadline Hollywood confirmed on November 10, 2014, that Endgame Entertainment had come on board to produce the film.

=== Pre-production ===
"It's a very strange thing to do [a story about] an American man, and not be able to finance this movie in America. And that's very disturbing, if you think about its implications on any subject that is not overtly pro-American. They say we have freedom of expression; but thought is financed, and thought is controlled, and the media is controlled. This country is very tight on that, and there's no criticism allowed at a certain level. You can make movies about civil rights leaders who are dead, but it's not easy to make one about a current man."

— Oliver Stone, director of Snowden, on the difficulty of making the film in the U.S.

Before production began, Stone and Gordon-Levitt met Snowden in 2015 in Moscow, where he had been living in exile with his girlfriend, Lindsay Mills, since evading the U.S. government's attempts to arrest him for espionage. The U.S. government had revoked his passport while Snowden was trying to reach South America. Gordon-Levitt described Snowden as a person who is akin to Philippe Petit, whom Gordon-Levitt played in the 2015 film The Walk. Problems arose in Russia, however, as companies that were affiliated with the U.S. refused to become involved in the project, and no studio was ready to support it. It became extremely difficult for Stone, who had to finance everything along with the producer. Eventually, financing came through from France and Germany, and the film ended up being shot in Germany as a German production, with contracts being signed eight days before production began. Since the budget was too tight, Stone had to miss the funeral of his mother, who had died in America while filming was occurring in Germany. Going back to America would have meant that Stone would have had to cut four days of work, which he said he could not afford to do.

=== Casting ===
On September 21, 2014, Joseph Gordon-Levitt was in talks to play Edward Snowden, the American computer professional who leaked classified information from the National Security Agency (NSA) to the mainstream media starting in June 2013. On November 10, 2014, news confirmed that Gordon-Levitt would be starring in the lead role. On November 14, 2014, Shailene Woodley was in final talks to join the film, to play Snowden's girlfriend, Lindsay Mills. On February 2, 2015, Scott Eastwood joined the cast to play an NSA agent. On February 4, 2015, three more actors joined the cast; Melissa Leo played documentary filmmaker Laura Poitras, who filmed the most famous recording of Snowden, Zachary Quinto played Glenn Greenwald, the journalist chosen by Snowden to leak sensitive information, and Tom Wilkinson played Ewen MacAskill, defense and intelligence correspondent for The Guardian, who helped report the Snowden story. On February 13, 2015, Variety reported that Ben Schnetzer had also joined the film. On February 19, 2015, Timothy Olyphant joined the film to star as a CIA agent who befriended Snowden before he left for Russia, and Rhys Ifans and Joely Richardson were added to the cast of the film on February 20, 2015. On February 23, 2015, Nicolas Cage also signed on to play the role of a former US Intelligence official. Lakeith Stanfield was added to the cast on February 25, 2015, to play an NSA co-worker and a close friend to Snowden.

For his role as Snowden, Joseph Gordon-Levitt pledged to donate his entire salary from the film to "help facilitate the conversation" about the relationship between technology and democracy.

=== Filming ===
Principal photography began on February 16, 2015, in Munich, Germany. Shooting was underway in Washington, D.C. in early April, and shooting in Hawaii began on April 15 and lasted until April 18. The house used to film is on the same street Snowden lived on. At the end of April, Hong Kong press reported that crews started filming in The Mira Hong Kong, followed by outdoor filming in some old buildings in To Kwa Wan. Shooting lasted until mid-May. Some exterior footage was also filmed in Tokyo.

Due to fear of interference by the National Security Agency, Stone decided to shoot the film mostly outside of the United States. "We felt like we were at risk here. We didn't know what the NSA might do, so we ended up in Munich, which was a beautiful experience," Stone said. Due to fears of the film leaking, Stone employed self-described ethical hacker Ralph Echemendia as a technical supervisor, and made sure all cast and crew used a secure chat-and-file-sharing program.

=== Music ===
Peter Gabriel wrote the song "The Veil" exclusively for the film. The track's video features photos and a cameo of Snowden as well as news coverage scenes and footage from the movie.

== Release ==
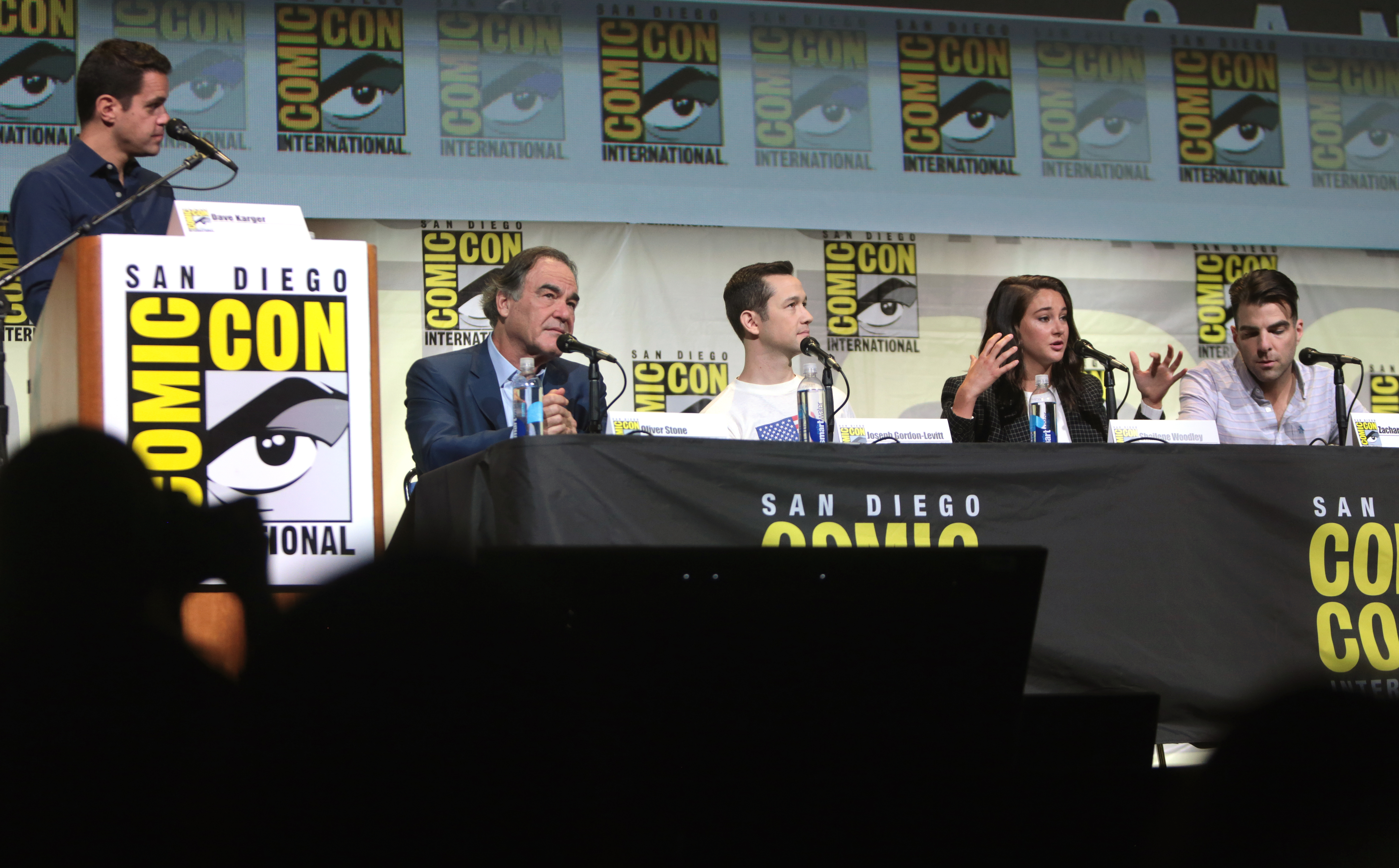
The cast and director of Snowden at the 2016 San Diego Comic-Con to promote the film.

On February 20, 2015, Open Road Films set the film for a December 25, 2015 domestic release date. Pathé would release the film in France on December 30, 2015, and Universum Film would release it in Germany on January 7, 2016. However, in September 2015, Open Road moved the film from its December release date to 2016. The studio did not give reasons for the delay; however, The Hollywood Reporter reported that it may have been because the film was not finished yet. On October 7, 2015, the film was set for a May 13, 2016 release. On February 19, 2016, the release date was again pushed back to September 16, at the forefront of awards season. The official trailer was published on April 27, 2016.

The film was invited to compete at the 2016 Cannes Film Festival, as the festival's director, Thierry Frémaux, saw the film and praised it, calling it a "really good film. It complements Citizenfour marvelously. It helps understand a lot of things". Frémaux said he wanted the film to screen at Cannes, but explained that the film's producers "want to aim for the Oscars, so for them a Cannes premiere was a little too early". It was shown at the 2016 Toronto International Film Festival, and had its European premiere at the 64th San Sebastián Film Festival.

Stone held a private screening of Snowden at the former home of Ernest Hemingway in Sun Valley, for an invited audience of around two dozen, including actress Melissa Leo, who portrayed documentary filmmaker Laura Poitras. Guests were required to sign non-disclosure agreements. The film received critical praise from the attendees, and one audience member was quoted saying, "What he did that's so brilliant is, he gave this kid's whole back story, so you really like him." The film had an invitation-only screening at San Diego Comic-Con on July 21, 2016. A second trailer for the film was released at the event.

== Reception ==
=== Box office ===
Snowden grossed $21.6 million in the United States and Canada and $15.7 million in other countries, for a worldwide total of $37.3 million, against a production budget of $40 million.

The film was released on September 16, 2016, alongside Blair Witch, Bridget Jones's Baby and Hillsong: Let Hope Rise, and was projected to gross around $10 million from 2,443 theaters in its opening weekend. It went on to open to $8 million, finishing 4th at the box office. It marked the lowest opening of Oliver Stone's career for a film playing in over 2,000 theaters.

=== Critical response ===
Snowden received mixed reviews from critics, although Gordon-Levitt's performance garnered critical praise. On Rotten Tomatoes, the film has an approval rating of 61%, based on 257 reviews, with an average score of 6.2/10. The website's critical consensus reads, "Snowden boasts a thrilling fact-based tale and a solid lead performance from Joseph Gordon-Levitt, even if director Oliver Stone saps the story of some of its impact by playing it safe." On Metacritic, the film has a score of 58 out of 100, based on 43 critics, indicating "mixed or average reviews". Audiences polled by CinemaScore gave the film an average grade of "A" on an A+ to F scale.

Richard Roeper gave the film three out of four stars, saying, "Snowden works best when it's just Edward and the three journalists in that hotel room, sweating it out, or when we see the pattern of events that led him to commit acts that exposed the shocking practices of our own government that also quite possibly created serious security breaches."

On November 19, 2016, during the Camerimage festival, cinematographer Anthony Dod Mantle received the Bronze Frog award for his work on this film.

=== Accolades ===
List of awards and nominations
Award	Date of ceremony	Category	Recipients	Result	Ref.
Camerimage	November 19, 2016	Bronze Frog Award for Best Cinematography	Anthony Dod Mantle	Won	
Washington D.C. Area Film Critics Association	December 5, 2016	Best Portrayal of Washington D.C.	Snowden	Nominated	
Women Film Critics Circle	December 19, 2016	Best Male Image in a Movie	Snowden	Nominated	
Women Film Critics Circle	December 19, 2016	Best Screen Couple	Snowden	Nominated	
Grammy Awards	February 12, 2017	Best Song Written for Visual Media	Peter Gabriel; For the song "The Veil"	Nominated	
Satellite Awards	February 19, 2017	Best Actor	Joseph Gordon-Levitt	Nominated	
Satellite Awards	February 19, 2017	Best Adapted Screenplay	Oliver Stone and Kieran Fitzgerald	Won	
2017 Cinema for Peace Award for Justice			Oliver Stone and Kieran Fitzgerald	Won	
Golden Raspberry Awards	February 25, 2017	Worst Supporting Actor	Nicolas Cage	Nominated	

== See also ==
- Reality Winner
- Chelsea Manning
