= Vadim Shumkov =

Russian politician (born 1971)

- Вадим Шумков
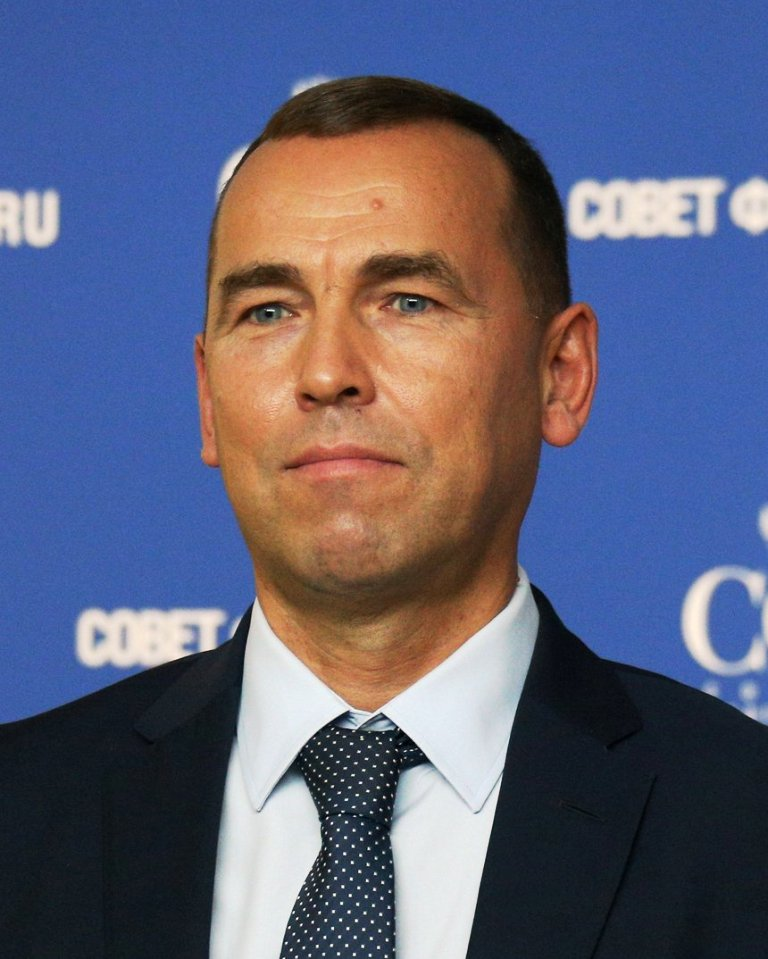
- Shumkov in 2021

5th Governor of Kurgan Oblast
- Incumbent
- Assumed office 18 September 2019
- Preceded by: Aleksey Kokorin

Governor of Kurgan Oblast (acting)
- In office 2 October 2018 – 18 September 2019

Deputy Governor of the Tyumen Oblast
- In office 22 November 2012 – 2 October 2018
- Succeeded by: Vladimir Sysoyev

Director of the Department of Investment Policy and State Support of Entrepreneurship of the Tyumen Oblast
- In office 21 June 2006 – 26 October 2015
- Succeeded by: Leonid Ostroumov

Personal details
- Born: Vadim Mikhailovich Shumkov; 9 March 1971 (age 55) Shastovo, Russia, Soviet Union
- Party: Independent

Vadim Mikhailovich Shumkov (Russian: Вадим Михайлович Шумков; born on 9 March 1971) is a Russian politician who is currently the fifth governor of Kurgan Oblast.

== Biography ==
Vadim Shumkov was born in Shastovo, Kurgan Oblast on 9 March 1971.

At the age of 7–8, he studied with a boxing coach-teacher Vasily Kovtun. To do this, he went by bus from the village of, Shastovo in Vargashi village 2 or 3 times a week.

As a teenager, he lived in the north of Tomsk Oblast, near the town of Strezhevoy.

After finishing school he entered the Tomsk Pedagogical Institute, the Faculty of Foreign Languages. Three years later he changed his specialty.

In 1991, he entered the Tomsk State University at the Faculty of Law. After the 3rd course, he started working. From November to December 1994, Shumkov worked as an accounting economist at the oil-Yugansk branch of Tyumenprofbank, and from January to March 1995, as a legal adviser for the securities department of Yuganskneftegaz JSC (asset of YUKOS).

From April 1995 to November 1998, he consecutively held the positions of Assistant to the President, Legal Counsel and General Director of Yuganskpromfinko. By appointment of the Arbitration Court of the Khanty-Mansiysk Autonomous Okrug from June 1998 to June 2000, he was a bankruptcy commissioner of a number of enterprises.

In 1996, he graduated from Tomsk State University with a degree in jurisprudence. Later he studied at the Russian Academy of Public Administration under the President of Russia.

In 1998, within the framework of the presidential management training program, he studied in Germany at the Export Academy of Baden-Württemberg.

By appointment of the Arbitration Court of the Khanty-Mansiysk Autonomous Okrug, from June 1998 to June 2000, he was the bankruptcy administrator of AOZT ATO-2, from December 1998 to January 2000 - the bankruptcy administrator of OOO Yuganskpromfinko, from February 2001 to May 2002 - external manager of OJSC “Nefteyugansk river port” (from July 2000 to February 2001 he was a legal adviser of LLC “Trading house”).

He worked as an advisor to the bankruptcy commissioner of OJSC Yuzhno-Balyksky gas processing plant (from March to August 2003) and advisor to the manager of OOO Alliance (from December 2003 to March 2004).

=== In the government of the Tyumen Oblast ===
In February 2004, the Governor of the Tyumen Oblast, Sergey Sobyanin, signed a decree on the creation of a department for strategic development of the region. Oleg Chemezov, the First Deputy Governor, supervised the work of the department.

Vladimir Sysoyev was appointed director of the department, and Shumkov in April 2004 was appointed deputy director. Shumkov has been in the office of the Governor of the Tyumen Oblast since 2005.

In July 2006, by the decision of Governor Vladimir Yakushev, a department for investment policy and state support for entrepreneurship of the Tyumen Oblast was created in the structure of the regional administration. Shumkov was appointed director of the department. From autumn 2010 to 13 October 2011, he blogged on the LiveJournal platform.

==== Vice Governor of Tyumen Oblast ====
On 22 November 2012, Yakushev, appointed Shumkov as his deputy for the activities of the regional department of the forestry complex (while until 26 October 2015, Shumkov also retained his previous position).

He later controlled the departments of investment policy, economics and forestry, coordinated interaction with federal ministries - foreign affairs, economic development, industry and trade.

From 2015 to 2016, he organized the construction of a chapel in the village of Shastovo in honor of the Descent of the Holy Spirit on the Apostles in memory of the soldiers for the Faith, Fatherland and people who laid down their lives.

He was a participant of the second recruitment program for the development of the personnel management reserve of the Higher School of Public Administration of the Russian Academy of National Economy and Public Administration under the President of Russia in 2017.

=== Acting Governor of the Kurgan Oblast ===
By the decree of the Russian President, Vladimir Putin, on 2 October 2018, Shumkov was appointed Acting Governor of the Kurgan Oblast.

In a study conducted in the spring of 2019, the Center for Current Politics (CPC) of Russia called Shumkov “a tough and uncompromising anti-crisis manager” and the toughest of the acting interim governors of the regions of Russia. According to the CPC experts, Shumkov decided to oppose himself to the previous regional leadership in a number of areas: he began work by addressing specific issues that “caused the greatest irritation among the population and were associated with shortcomings or weakness” of the previous governor. He reduced the regional bureaucratic apparatus, liquidated a number of legal entities that had a bureaucratic nature (annual savings of 80 million rubles), and eliminated the region's debts for regional maternity capital in the amount of 200 million rubles, appointed 6,000 regional scholarships for low-income students, introduced regional subsidies for families of doctors working in the region, equal to the federal one, and solves the garbage and road problems at a faster pace, with the economic development (TASED) in the city of Kataysk.

On the Single Voting Day, on 8 September 2019, in the first round of elections for the Governor of the Kurgan Oblast, Shumkov won the election. The voting was attended by 296,705 voters, which is 42.58% of the number of voters included in the voter lists at the end of voting. Votes were distributed as follows: Shumkov (self-nominated) received 239,902 votes, which is 80.86%, Yakov Sidorov, (Communist Party of the Russian Federation) - 9.7%, Tatyana Mayboroda (A Just Russia) - 4.7%, Yuri Yarushin (Liberal Democratic Party of Russia) - 3.33%.

On 10 September 2019, Shumkov announced the extension of the term of office of the senator from the executive branch of the Kurgan region Yelena Perminova for a new term (in addition to her, before the elections, he named Sergey Lisovsky and the head of the financial department of the region Konstantin Yermakov as his possible candidates for members of the Federation Council).

=== Governor of the Kurgan Oblast ===
On 18 September 2019 at 14:00, the inauguration of the elected governor of the Kurgan region took place in the Great Hall of the Kurgan Regional Philharmonic.

His term of office will end in 2024.

On 25 October 2019, the police began an investigation at the request of the director of the Siberian-Ural Energy Company (SUENKO) Danil Anuchin, who accused blogger Ilya Vinstein of violating Article 282 of the Criminal Code of the Russia (Incitement to hatred or enmity, as well as humiliation of human dignity) and 20.3 of the Administrative Code (Propaganda or a public demonstration of Nazi paraphernalia or symbols) on the fact of the publication of a satirical video on the social network VKontakte, where the scene of the meeting with Adolf Hitler from the movie "Bunker" was provided with subtitles imitating the meeting with the governor Shumkov.

From 27 January to 21 December 2020 he was a member Member of the Presidium of the State Council of the Russia.

== Income ==
The total amount of declared income for 2017 amounted to 10 million 509 thousand rubles, spouses - 1 million 335 thousand rubles.

== Family ==
Shumkov is married to Olga Viktorovna Shumkova. The family has four children: two sons and two daughters. The eldest son Ivan retired to the reserve after military service, served in the presidential regiment, he has a twin sister Maria. She lives in Moscow and studies at the RANEPA with a degree in economics and foreign languages. Their younger children, Aleksandr and Daria are schoolchildren.

His grandmother during the Great Patriotic War was the chairman of the Shastovsky village council, according to other sources, the chairman of the collective farm in the village of Shastovo.

His great-grandfather, a corporal of the 2nd Infantry Regiment of the Austro-Hungarian army Andreas Yalovitski, was in Russian captivity in the autumn of 1914.

== Hobbies ==
Shumkov likes everything that is connected with Russia, with nature, history, culture, ancient traditions.

I always stress that I am a Russian person. I love the bathhouse very much. I am very interested in history. And to the history of the native Kurgan region, and to the history of Russia, and to international relations.

— .

He likes to read history books, watch documentary films about the history of Russia.

He prefers to spend his vacation in his native village in the Kurgan Oblast.

== Sanctions ==
In February 2023, following the Russian invasion of Ukraine, the Office of Foreign Assets Control of the United States Department of the Treasury added Shumkov to the Specially Designated Nationals and Blocked Persons List due to his involvement in the enforcement of the conscription of Russian citizens in response to the 2022 mobilization order during the invasion.

In April 2023, he was sanctioned by Ukraine due to him being "the head of a state body that supported / encouraged / publicly approved the policy of the Russian Federation aimed at conducting military operations and genocide of the civilian population in Ukraine."
