= Oleg Panteleyev =

Russian statesman

- Олег Пантелеев
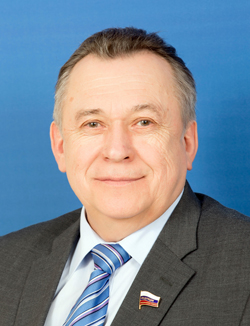

Member of the Federation Council of Kurgan Oblast on Executive Authority
- In office 26 April 2001 – 26 September 2014
- Preceded by: Oleg Bogomolov
- Succeeded by: Yelena Perminova

Personal details
- Born: Oleg Yevgenyevich Panteleyev; 21 July 1952 Zhitnikovskoye, Russia, Soviet Union
- Died: 15 September 2016 (aged 64) Moscow, Russia
- Party: United Russia

Oleg Yevgenyevich Panteleyev (Russian: Олег Евгеньевич Пантелеев; 21 July 1952 - 15 September 2016), was a Russian statesman, who was the member of the Federation Council from the executive body of state power of the Kurgan Oblast from 2001 to 2014.

== Biography ==
Oleg Panteleyev was born on 21 July 1952, in the village of Zhitnikovskoye, in the Chashinsky district of the Kurgan Oblast. The village is now part of the Kargapolsky district of the same region.

In 1970, he graduated from Chashinskaya secondary school.

In 1975, he graduated from the Kurgan Agricultural Institute with a degree in agricultural scientist.

From 1975 to 1976, he worked as an agronomist at the Zhitnikovskoye state farm, Kargapolsky district.

From 1976 to 1979, he was an instructor, and in 1979 to 1981, he was the head of the department of workers and rural youth of the Kurgan regional committee of the Komsomol.

In 1978, he joined the Communist Party of the Soviet Union.

From 1981 to 1982, he was on a business trip to Afghanistan as an adviser to the Central Committee of the Komsomol.

From 1983 to 1987, he worked as an instructor at the Kurgan Regional Committee of the CPSU. Between 1987 and 1993, he was in senior officer positions in the Russian foreign intelligence service. He also served in the First Main Directorate of the KGB as a colonel.

In 1990, he graduated from the Red Banner Institute of the KGB of the USSR, Yu. V. Andropov, specializing in international economics.

Between 1990 and 1993, he was an expert at the Licensintorg Association of the Ministry of Foreign Economic Relations.

In 1993, a representative office of the Kurgan Oblast was created under the Government of Russia, and Panteleyev became its first head and at the same time deputy governor of the Kurgan Oblast.

On 26 April 2001, Panteleyev was a member of the Federation Council - a representative from the executive body of state power of the Kurgan region. He was a Deputy Chairman, a member of the Committee on CIS Affairs, the First Deputy Chairman of the Federation Council Committee on Rules and Organization of Parliamentary Activities, and a member of the European Parliament, in which case he took part in the work of the Federation Council delegation to the Parliamentary Assembly of the Collective Security Treaty Organization and the EurAsEC Assembly. He was a member of the parliamentary commission to investigate the reasons and circumstances of the terrorist act in Beslan on September 1–3, 2004. In March 2007, he headed the joint commission on cooperation between the Federation Council and the Parliament of Tajikistan.

From 2002 to 2008, he was elected secretary of the Political Council of the United Russia party, and was a member of the General Council of the party, and a member of the Political Council of the Kurgan regional branch of the party.

From September 2014 to September 2016, Panteleyev served as First Deputy Governor of the Kurgan Oblast - the Head of the Representative Office of the Kurgan Oblats under the Government of Russia.

Oleg Evgenievich Panteleev died on the night of 16 September 2016 in a hospital in Moscow. Half a month before his death, he caught a cold, then the cold turned into severe pneumonia. In the last days, he was in a coma and died without leaving it. He was buried at the Troekurovsky cemetery in the Ochakovo-Matveevskoe district of the Western administrative district of Moscow.

=== Sanctions ===
By Decree of the President of Ukraine No. 133/2017 of 15 May 2017, Panteleyev was included in the list of individuals who are sanctions, and he appeared in the list at number 502. For a period of 1 year, he is prohibited from entering Ukraine.

He also appeared in the sanctions lists of the European Union and the United States. He was removed from the European list after his death.

== Personal life ==
=== Family ===
His father, Yevgeny, was the director of the Zhitnikovskoye orphanage. His mother was the director of the Zhitnikovskoye secondary school. He raised two children: a son and a daughter. His wife is a neuropathologist. His daughter is teacher of foreign languages.

=== Hobbies ===
He was fond of photographing animals. He was the president of the Union of Naturalist Photographers, one of the organizers and authors of the traditional photo exhibition of the Golden Turtle international competition, the all-Russian nature festivals “Primordial Russia”, “The Most Beautiful Country”, “Wildlife”. His photographic works were published by various publications and specialized photo magazines. The first camera "Photocor" was presented to Oleg when he was 9 years old. In 2007, he manufactured a technical complex for creating photographs at a great distance. A tripod with a camera is installed in the immediate habitat of animals, and the photographer himself equips an observation point at a considerable distance. With the help of a radio signal, the image from the moving camera is transmitted to a remote monitor, the photographer takes a picture at the desired angle and evaluates its quality on the display.

He was fond of hunting, shot the world's largest deer and became a champion.
