= 2025 Kurgan Oblast legislative election =

Regional legislative election in Russia

← 2020	13–14 September 2025	2030 →

All 34 seats in the Oblast Duma 18 seats needed for a majority
- Turnout: 38.32% ▲7.27 pp
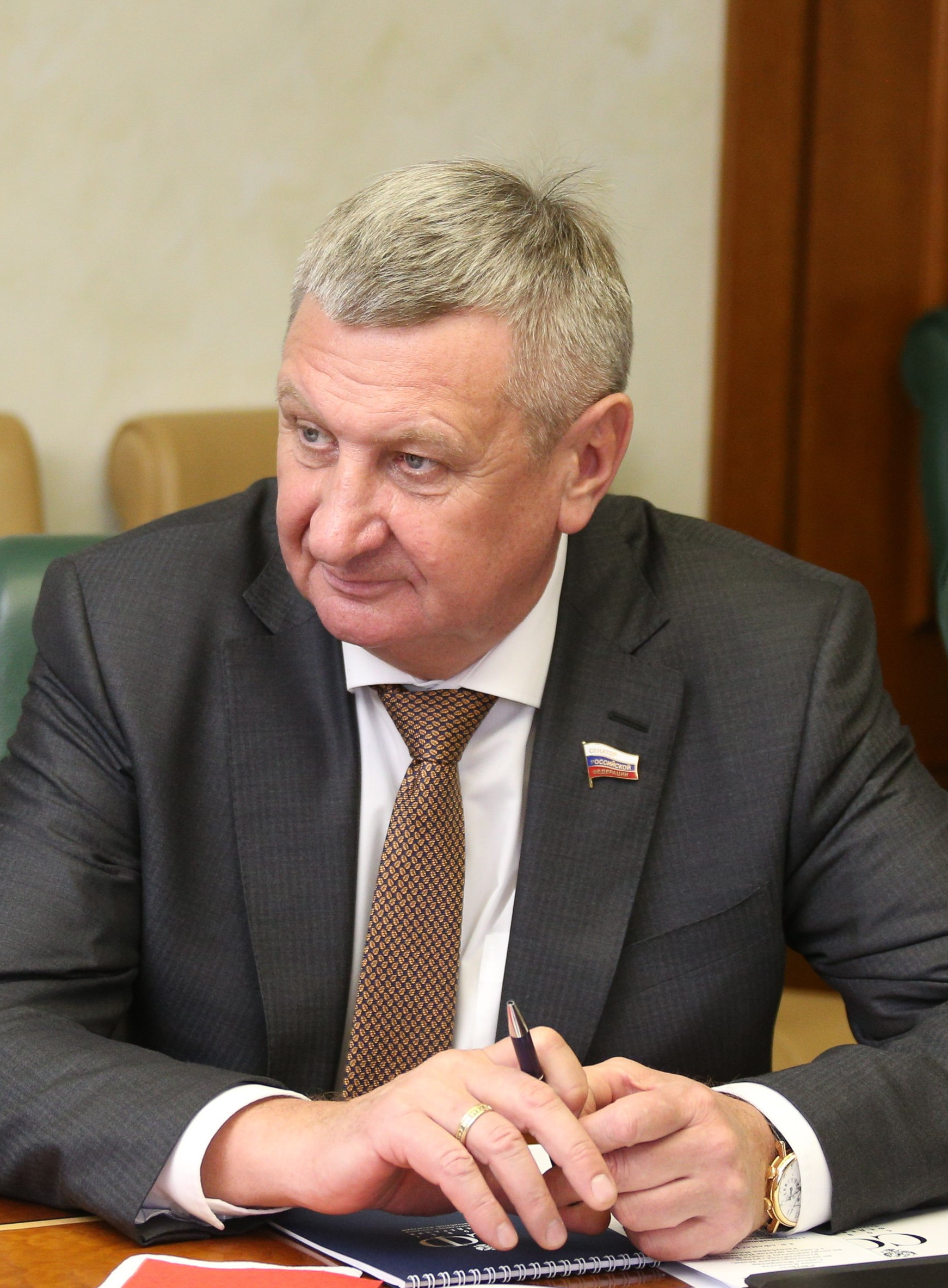
	Majority party	Minority party	Third party
		LDPR	CPRF
Candidate	Sergey Muratov	Yury Yarushin	Viktor Zyryanov
Party	United Russia	LDPR	CPRF
Last election	44.57%, 27 seats	14.46%, 2 seats	19.05%, 3 seats
Seats won	29	1	1
Seat change	▲2	▼1	▼2
Popular vote	134,455	31,462	26,180
Percentage	54.91%	12.85%	10.69%
Swing	▲10.34 pp	▼1.61 pp	▼8.36 pp
	Fourth party	Fifth party	Sixth party
	NL	RPPSS	SR–ZP
Candidate	Kirill Rogozin	Yaroslav Klimko	Valery Derzhavin
Party	New People	Party of Pensioners	SR–ZP
Last election	Did not participate	8.27%, 1 seat	10.54%, 1 seat
Seats won	1	1	1
Seat change	Did not participate	Steady	Steady
Popular vote	18,050	15,270	14,385
Percentage	7.37%	6.24%	5.87%
Swing	Did not participate	▼2.03 pp	▼4.67 pp
Chairman before election
Dmitry Frolov
United Russia
Elected Chairman
Dmitry Frolov
United Russia

The 2025 Kurgan Oblast Duma election took place on 13–14 September 2025, on common election day. All 34 seats in the Oblast Duma were up for re-election.

United Russia increased its already overwhelming majority in the Oblast Duma, winning 54.9% of the vote and all 17 single-mandate constituencies. Communist Party of the Russian Federation suffered major defeat, losing more than 40% of its vote share and retaining only a single seat, Liberal Democratic Party of Russia also lost one of its two seats. A Just Russia – For Truth had its vote share dropped almost in half, however, it retained its single deputy. New People entered the Oblast Duma for the first time.

== Electoral system ==
Under current election laws, the Oblast Duma is elected for a term of five years, with parallel voting. 17 seats are elected by party-list proportional representation with a 5% electoral threshold, with the other half elected in 17 single-member constituencies by first-past-the-post voting. Seats in the proportional part are allocated using the Imperiali quota, modified to ensure that every party list, which passes the threshold, receives at least one mandate.

== Candidates ==
=== Party lists ===
To register regional lists of candidates, parties need to collect 0.5% of signatures of all registered voters in Kurgan Oblast.

The following parties were relieved from the necessity to collect signatures:

- United Russia
- Communist Party of the Russian Federation
- Liberal Democratic Party of Russia
- A Just Russia — Patriots — For Truth
- New People
- Russian Party of Pensioners for Social Justice

№	Party	Territorial groups leaders	Candidates	Territorial groups	Status
1	Liberal Democratic Party	Anton Baryshev • Pavel Vagin • Anatoly Shakhov • Maria Maksimova • Aleksandr Galygin • Yelizaveta Isayeva • Vladislav Denisov • Lyudmila Zulkarnayeva • Aleksey Vishnyagov • Zoya Chudinova • Oleg Samsonov • Sofya Kiryanova • Anton Rudakov • Yury Yarushin • Aleksandr Usoltsev • Sergey Zhosan • Valery Gorobets	56	17	Registered
2	Party of Pensioners	Dmitry Belozerov • Vladimir Medvedev • Ilya Kugushev • Natalya Davydova • Aleksey Predein • Nina Klimko • Vladislav Lomakin • Yelena Belozerova • ~~Mikhail Klimko~~ • Aleksey Protasov • Yaroslav Klimko	33	11	Registered
3	New People	Irina Nalimova • Mikhail Gaydukov • Ksenia Tropina • Anzhelika Brattseva • Anna Bagretsova • Daniil Moskvin • Maksim Tikhonov • Sergey Neugodnikov • Olga Vitkovskaya • Milena Okhokhonina • Yaroslavna Volodina • Yelizaveta Sendyk • Vera Maltseva • Darya Perevalova • Kirill Rogozin • Nadezhda Pavina • Vadim Nigmatulayev	68	17	Registered
4	United Russia	Dmitry Zhukovsky • Oleg Loginov • Aleksey Kubasov • Vadim Shumkov • Vyacheslav Nemirov • Sergey Paryshev • Olga Balanchuk • Yury Cherkashchenko • Maria Yuminova • Sergey Maksimov • Olga Druzhinina • Oleg Popov • Nikita Kurbachenkov • Yevgeny Nesterov • Aleksandr Pylkov • Sergey Muratov • Roman Khokhlov	82	17	Registered
5	A Just Russia – For Truth	Oleg Bannikov • Sergey Yudin • Vladimir Chukhlomlin • Radik Shakirov • Madlen Biisova • Vitaly Zharkov • Pavel Kotyusov • Vadim Valeyev • Nadezhda Novozhilova • Stepan Kormin • Sergey Kiverin • Irina Burulkina • Svetlana Chistyakova • Valery Derzhavin • Andrey Fedotov • Yelena Zhivotyagina • Aleksandr Futerman	71	17	Registered
6	Communist Party	Ivan Kamshilov • Vitaly Savelyev • Igor Gataulin • Sergey Fedotov • Viktor Zyryanov • Aleksandr Mikhaylov • Kuzma Dyakonov • Nikolay Mikushin • Vera Ovchinnikova • Vladimir Pechenin • Mukhametgaley Abdrakhmanov • Pavel Dmitriyev • Mikhail Golubkov • Vladimir Trukhanov • Igor Oboldin • Aleksandr Pesterev • Sergey Yeremin	44	17	Registered

New People will take part in Kurgan Oblast legislative election for the first time.

=== Single-mandate constituencies ===
17 single-mandate constituencies were formed in Kurgan Oblast. To register candidates in single-mandate constituencies need to collect 3% of signatures of registered voters in the constituency.

Number of candidates in single-mandate constituencies
Party	Candidates	
Party	Nominated	Registered
United Russia	17	17
Communist Party	16	15
Liberal Democratic Party	17	17
A Just Russia – For Truth	16	15
Party of Pensioners	2	2
New People	17	17
Yabloko	1	0
Independent	2	0
Total	88	83

== Polls ==
Fieldwork date	Polling firm	UR	LDPR	CPRF	NL	RPPSS	SR-ZP
14 September 2025	2025 election	54.9	12.9	10.7	7.4	6.2	5.9
25 August – 3 September 2025	Russian Field	59.0	14.0	9.8	7.9	3.2	5.8
13 September 2020	2020 election	44.6	14.5	19.1	–	8.3	10.5

== Results ==
=== Results by party lists ===
Summary of the 13–14 September 2025 Kurgan Oblast Duma election results
Party	Party list					Constituency		Total	
Party	Votes	%	±pp	Seats	+/–	Seats	+/–	Seats	+/–
United Russia	134,455	54.91	▲10.34	12	▲2	17	Steady	29	▲2
Liberal Democratic Party	31,462	12.85	▼1.61	1	▼1	0	Steady	1	▼1
Communist Party	26,180	10.69	▼8.36	1	▼2	0	Steady	1	▼2
New People	18,050	7.37	New	1	New	0	New	1	New
Party of Pensioners	15,270	6.24	▼2.03	1	Steady	0	Steady	1	Steady
A Just Russia — For Truth	14,385	5.87	▼4.67	1	Steady	0	Steady	1	Steady
Invalid ballots	5,073	2.07%	▼1.03	—	—	—	—	—	—
Total	244,875	100.00	—	17	Steady	17	Steady	34	Steady
Turnout	244,875	38.32	▲7.27	—	—	—	—	—	—
Registered voters	639,070	100.00	—	—	—	—	—	—	—

Dmitry Frolov (United Russia) was re-elected as Chairman of the Oblast Duma, while incumbent Senator Sergey Muratov (United Russia) was re-appointed to the Federation Council.

=== Results in single-member constituencies ===
==== District 1 ====
Summary of the 13–14 September 2025 Kurgan Oblast Duma election in Eastern constituency No.1
Candidate	Party	Votes	%
Vladimir Semyonov	United Russia	2,777	38.22%
Pavel Vagin	Liberal Democratic Party	1,909	26.27%
Vera Ovchinnikova	Communist Party	1,238	17.04%
Irina Nalimova	New People	1,136	15.63%
Total		7,266	100%

==== District 2 ====
Summary of the 13–14 September 2025 Kurgan Oblast Duma election in Central constituency No.2
Candidate	Party	Votes	%
Tatyana Khilchuk (incumbent)	United Russia	5,072	54.30%
Viktor Zyryanov	Communist Party	1,591	17.03%
Yaroslavna Volodina	New People	993	10.63%
Maria Maksimova	Liberal Democratic Party	795	8.51%
Vadim Valeyev	A Just Russia – For Truth	708	7.58%
Total		9,340	100%

==== District 3 ====
Summary of the 13–14 September 2025 Kurgan Oblast Duma election in Western constituency No.3
Candidate	Party	Votes	%
Dmitry Frolov (incumbent)	United Russia	4,785	52.59%
Sergey Fedotov	Communist Party	1,150	12.64%
Aleksey Vishnyagov	Liberal Democratic Party	1,026	11.28%
Stepan Kormin	A Just Russia – For Truth	1,001	11.00%
Kirill Rogozin	New People	931	10.23%
Total		9,099	100%

==== District 4 ====
Summary of the 13–14 September 2025 Kurgan Oblast Duma election in Zheleznodorozhny constituency No.4
Candidate	Party	Votes	%
Yevgeny Sergeyev	United Russia	2,900	36.99%
Daniil Moskvin	New People	1,088	13.88%
Igor Gataulin	Communist Party	991	12.64%
Yaroslav Klimko	Party of Pensioners	976	12.45%
Yelizaveta Isayeva	Liberal Democratic Party	925	11.80%
Aleksandr Futerman	A Just Russia – For Truth	735	9.38%
Total		7,839	100%

==== District 5 ====
Summary of the 13–14 September 2025 Kurgan Oblast Duma election in Zaozerny constituency №5
Candidate	Party	Votes	%
Roman Romanovich	United Russia	4,964	47.84%
Anton Baryshev	Liberal Democratic Party	2,471	23.81%
Nadezhda Pavina	New People	1,651	15.91%
Valery Derzhavin	A Just Russia – For Truth	1,009	9.72%
Total		10,377	100%

==== District 6 ====
Summary of the 13–14 September 2025 Kurgan Oblast Duma election in Ryabkovsky constituency No.6
Candidate	Party	Votes	%
Igor Prozorov	United Russia	5,728	60.65%
Anton Rudakov	Liberal Democratic Party	1,442	15.27%
Yelena Zhivotyagina	A Just Russia – For Truth	1,097	11.62%
Vera Maltseva	New People	949	10.05%
Total		9,444	100%

==== District 7 ====
Summary of the 13–14 September 2025 Kurgan Oblast Duma election in Shadrinsky constituency No.7
Candidate	Party	Votes	%
Valery Porubov (incumbent)	United Russia	5,059	51.40%
Igor Oboldin	Communist Party	1,434	14.57%
Ksenia Tropina	New People	1,130	11.48%
Irina Burulkina	A Just Russia – For Truth	948	9.63%
Ivan Kononov	Liberal Democratic Party	880	8.94%
Total		9,842	100%

==== District 8 ====
Summary of the 13–14 September 2025 Kurgan Oblast Duma election in Shadrinsky constituency No.8
Candidate	Party	Votes	%
Sergey Nelyubin	United Russia	7,550	50.97%
Aleksandr Pesterev	Communist Party	2,032	13.72%
Anatoly Shakhov	Liberal Democratic Party	1,786	12.06%
Olga Vitkovskaya	New People	1,783	12.04%
Vladimir Chukhlomlin	A Just Russia – For Truth	1,277	8.62%
Total		14,814	100%

==== District 9 ====
Summary of the 13–14 September 2025 Kurgan Oblast Duma election in Kataysky constituency No.9
Candidate	Party	Votes	%
Fyodor Yaroslavtsev (incumbent)	United Russia	11,449	62.96%
Vladimir Trukhanov	Communist Party	1,926	10.59%
Yury Ponikarovskikh	Liberal Democratic Party	1,591	8.75%
Sergey Neugodnikov	New People	1,576	8.67%
Boris Bakman	A Just Russia – For Truth	1,078	5.93%
Total		18,185	100%

==== District 10 ====
Summary of the 13–14 September 2025 Kurgan Oblast Duma election in Shchuchansky constituency No.10
Candidate	Party	Votes	%
Aleksandr Chernyak (incumbent)	United Russia	8,281	53.13%
Mikhail Deulin	Communist Party	2,126	13.64%
Lyudmila Zulkarnayeva	Liberal Democratic Party	1,698	10.89%
Nadezhda Novozhilova	A Just Russia – For Truth	1,625	10.43%
Shaidkhan Muradisinov	Party of Pensioners	727	4.66%
Yelizaveta Sendyk	New People	651	4.18%
Total		15,587	100%

==== District 11 ====
Summary of the 13–14 September 2025 Kurgan Oblast Duma election in Shumikhinsky constituency No.11
Candidate	Party	Votes	%
Aleksey Markin	United Russia	5,850	36.13%
Radik Shakirov	A Just Russia – For Truth	3,344	20.65%
Mikhail Golubkov	Communist Party	3,275	20.23%
Maksim Tikhonov	New People	1,759	10.86%
Varvara Khomchenkova	Liberal Democratic Party	1,257	7.76%
Total		16,191	100%

==== District 12 ====
Summary of the 13–14 September 2025 Kurgan Oblast Duma election in Kargapolsky constituency No.12
Candidate	Party	Votes	%
Maksim Kharlov (incumbent)	United Russia	10,325	58.14%
Pavel Dmitriyev	Communist Party	2,572	14.48%
Aleksandr Usoltsev	Liberal Democratic Party	2,288	12.88%
Nikolay Bakhmatov	A Just Russia – For Truth	1,297	7.30%
Vadim Nigmatulayev	New People	778	4.38%
Total		17,760	100%

==== District 13 ====
Summary of the 13–14 September 2025 Kurgan Oblast Duma election in Kurtamyshsky constituency No.13
Candidate	Party	Votes	%
Aleksandr Oblasov (incumbent)	United Russia	8,999	53.61%
Nikolay Mikushin	Communist Party	2,283	13.60%
Pavel Vikhorev	Liberal Democratic Party	2,216	13.20%
Darya Perevalova	New People	1,508	8.98%
Yevgeny Yevstifeyev	A Just Russia – For Truth	1,403	8.36%
Total		16,786	100%

==== District 14 ====
Summary of the 13–14 September 2025 Kurgan Oblast Duma election in Pritobolny constituency No.14
Candidate	Party	Votes	%
Marat Islamov (incumbent)	United Russia	14,462	67.85%
Sergey Yeremin	Communist Party	2,362	11.08%
Sergey Zhosan	Liberal Democratic Party	1,996	9.36%
Anna Bagretsova	New People	1,910	8.96%
Total		21,314	100%

==== District 15 ====
Summary of the 13–14 September 2025 Kurgan Oblast Duma election in Vargashinsky constituency No.15
Candidate	Party	Votes	%
Vladimir Kazakov (incumbent)	United Russia	14,080	65.36%
Aleksandr Mikhaylov	Communist Party	2,472	11.47%
Aleksey Voinkov	Liberal Democratic Party	2,043	9.48%
Larisa Chistyakova	A Just Russia – For Truth	1,448	6.72%
Milana Okhokhonina	New People	1,063	4.93%
Total		21,543	100%

==== District 16 ====
Summary of the 13–14 September 2025 Kurgan Oblast Duma election in Makushinsky constituency No.16
Candidate	Party	Votes	%
Dmitry Iltyakov	United Russia	12,294	64.99%
Oleg Samsonov	Liberal Democratic Party	2,515	13.29%
Madlen Biisova	A Just Russia – For Truth	1,423	7.52%
Kuzma Dyakonov	Communist Party	1,208	6.39%
Anzhelika Brattseva	New People	1,007	5.32%
Total		18,917	100%

==== District 17 ====
Summary of the 13–14 September 2025 Kurgan Oblast Duma election in Ketovsky constituency No.17
Candidate	Party	Votes	%
Yevgeny Kafeyev (incumbent)	United Russia	9,406	55.11%
Yury Yarushin	Liberal Democratic Party	3,025	17.72%
Oleg Bannikov	A Just Russia – For Truth	1,800	10.55%
Ivan Kamshilov	Communist Party	1,306	7.65%
Mikhail Gaydukov	New People	1,205	7.06%
Total		17,069	100%

=== Members ===
Incumbent deputies are highlighted with bold, elected members who declined to take a seat are marked with ~~strikethrough~~.

Constituency
No.	Member	Party
1	Vladimir Semyonov	United Russia
2	Tatyana Khilchuk	United Russia
3	Dmitry Frolov	United Russia
4	Yevgeny Sergeyev	United Russia
5	Roman Romanovich	United Russia
6	Igor Prozorov	United Russia
7	Valery Porubov	United Russia
8	Sergey Nelyubin	United Russia
9	Fyodor Yaroslavtsev	United Russia
10	Aleksandr Chernyak	United Russia
11	Aleksey Markin	United Russia
12	Maksim Kharlov	United Russia
13	Aleksandr Oblasov	United Russia
14	Marat Islamov	United Russia
15	Vladimir Kazakov	United Russia
16	Dmitry Iltyakov	United Russia
17	Yevgeny Kafeyev	United Russia

Party lists
Member	Party
Sergey Muratov	United Russia
Sergey Paryshev	United Russia
Aleksey Kubasov	United Russia
Roman Khokhlov	United Russia
Dmitry Zhukovsky	United Russia
Olga Balanchuk	United Russia
Vyacheslav Nemirov	United Russia
Nikita Kurbachenkov	United Russia
Vadim Shumkov	United Russia
Oleg Popov	United Russia
Sergey Maksimov	United Russia
Oleg Loginov	United Russia
Pavel Vagin	Liberal Democratic Party
Viktor Zyryanov	Communist Party
Daniil Moskvin	New People
Yaroslav Klimko	Party of Pensioners
Irina Burulkina	A Just Russia – For Truth

== See also ==
- 2025 Russian regional elections
