= Governor of Kurgan Oblast =

Highest-ranking official in Kurgan Oblast, Russia

- Coat of arms of Kurgan Oblast

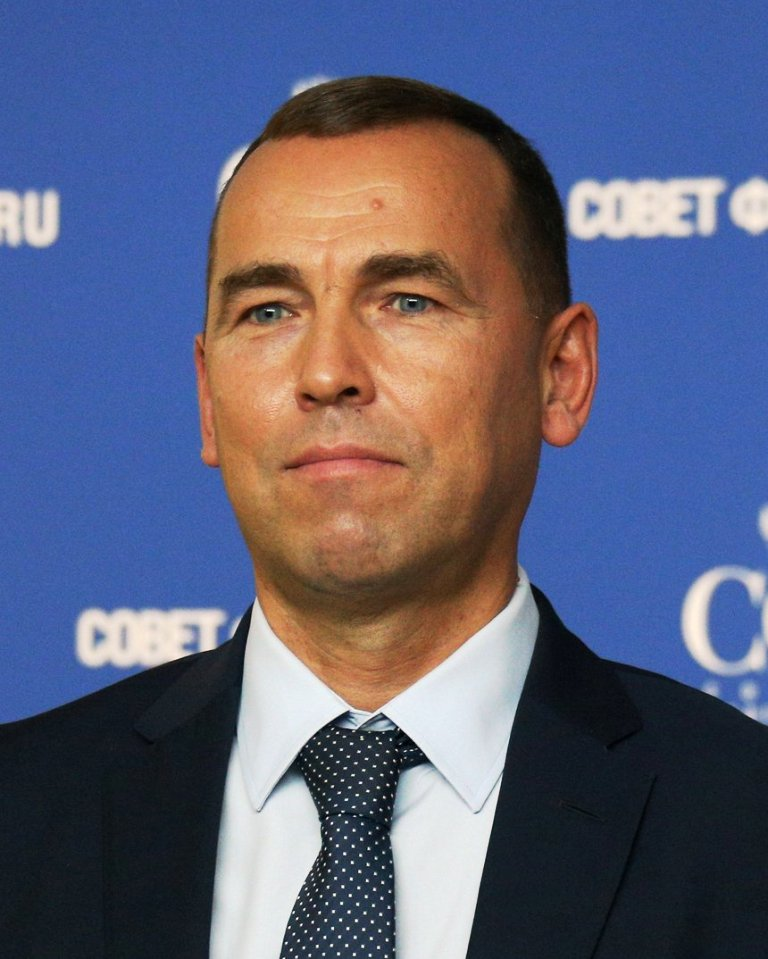
- Incumbent; Vadim Shumkov since 2 October 2018
- Seat: Kurgan
- Term length: 5 years
- Inaugural holder: Valentin Gerasimov
- Formation: 1991
- Website: www.kurganobl.ru

The Governor of Kurgan Oblast, Russia (Russian: Губернатор Курганской области) is the head of administration of that oblast.

== Governors ==
No.	Image	Name	Tenure	Time in office	Party	Election
1		Valentin Gerasimov (born 1940)	24 December 1991 – 9 August 1995 (resigned)	3 years, 228 days	Independent	Appointed
2		Anatoly Sobolev (born 1940)	15 August 1995 – 11 December 1996 (lost election)	1 year, 118 days	Independent	Appointed
3		Oleg Bogomolov (born 1950)	11 December 1996 – 14 February 2014 (resigned)	17 years, 65 days	Independent	1996; 2000; 2004; 2009
3		Oleg Bogomolov (born 1950)	11 December 1996 – 14 February 2014 (resigned)	17 years, 65 days	United Russia	1996; 2000; 2004; 2009
—		Aleksey Kokorin (born 1961)	14 February 2014 – 26 September 2014	4 years, 230 days	United Russia	Acting
4		Aleksey Kokorin (born 1961)	26 September 2014 – 2 October 2018 (resigned)	4 years, 230 days	United Russia	2014
—		Vadim Shumkov (born 1971)	2 October 2018 – 18 September 2019	7 years, 340 days	Independent	Acting
5		Vadim Shumkov (born 1971)	18 September 2019 – present	7 years, 340 days	Independent	2019; 2024

== Sources ==
- World Statesmen.org
