= Valentin Gerasimov =

Soviet politician

- Валентин Герасимов

1st Governor of Kurgan Oblast
- In office 24 October 1991 – 9 August 1995
- Succeeded by: Anatoly Sobolev

Chairman of the Kurgan Regional Council of People's Deputies
- In office November 1990 – 24 October 1991
- Preceded by: Aleksandr Plekhanov
- Succeeded by: Igor Panafidin (acting)

Chairman of the Executive Committee of the Kurgan Regional Council of People's Deputies
- In office June 1988 – 24 October 1991
- Preceded by: Aleksandr Mankhyov

First Secretary of the Kurgan City Committee of the CPSU
- In office 1986–1987
- Preceded by: Vitaly Plenichnikov

First Secretary of the Pervomaisky District Committee of the CPSU of the city of Kurgan
- In office 1985–1986
- Preceded by: Vitaly Plenichnikov

Personal details
- Born: Valentin Pavlovich Gerasimov; 28 May 1940 (age 85); Shumikha, RSFSR, Soviet Union
- Political party: Our Home - Russia

Valentin Pavlovich Gerasimov (Russian: Валентин Павлович Герасимов; born on 28 May 1940), is a Russian politician and party figure, who had served as the first Governor of Kurgan Oblast from 1991 to 1995.

== Biography ==
Valentin Gerasimov was born on 28 May 1940 into a working-class family in the working village of Shumikha, Shumikhinsky District, Chelyabinsk Oblast, now the administrative centre of the Shumikhinsky Municipal District, Kurgan Oblast. He is Russian. His father died in 1942.

In 1965, he graduated from the Kurgan Machine-Building Institute with a degree in automotive and tractor mechanical engineering. The same year, he worked at the Kurgan Bus Plant, where he went through all the stages - from design engineer to chief engineer from 1975 to 1979.

In 1967, he joined the Communist Party of the Soviet Union.

Since 1979, he was carrying out party work. He successively held the positions of second secretary of the Sovetsky City District committee of the CPSU of the city of Kurgan, first secretary of the Pervomaysky City District committee of the CPSU of the city of Kurgan, first secretary of the Kurgan city committee of the CPSU, second secretary of the Kurgan regional committee of the CPSU.

He had been elected deputy of the Supreme Soviet of the Russian SFSR's XI convocation from 1984 to 1989.

In 1985, he graduated from the Academy of Social Sciences under the Central Committee of the CPSU.

In June 1988, he became chairman of the Kurgan Regional Executive Committee of the Council of People's Deputies.

In April 1990, he was elected a People's Deputy of the RSFSR, was a member of the Communists of Russia faction.

From November 1990 to October 1991, he was chairman of the Kurgan Regional Council of People's Deputies.

On 24 October 1991, Gerasimov became the first Governor of Kurgan Oblast, as was one of the last ones to be appointed head of the administration of the federal subjects of Russia.

He was a member of the Council of the Association for Economic Interaction of Regions and Republics of the Ural Region, and a Member of the Council of the All-Russian Public Movement "Our Home – Russia" party.

On 9 August 1995, on the eve of the parliamentary and presidential elections, Gerasimov was removed from his post, and replaced by Deputy Governor Anatoly Sobolev who was appointed governor.

After his resignation, for two compositions, from 1995 to 2003, he headed the Kurgan Regional Electoral Commission.

== Family ==
His father, Pavel, died in 1942.

He has two children, daughter Larisa, (born 1962), and Aleksey (born 1975).
