= Ewen MacAskill =

Scottish journalist (born 1951)

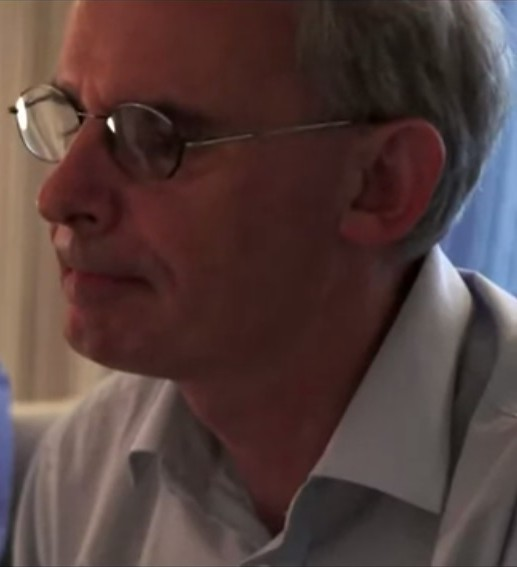
- MacAskill in 2014
- Born: 1951 (age 74–75); Glasgow, Scotland
- Education: University of Glasgow
- Occupation: Journalist
- Writing career
- Period: 1974–2018
- Genres: Non-fiction; political commentary
- Subjects: Politics; global surveillance
- Notable work: Snowden leaks
- Notable awards: George Polk award (2013)

Ewen MacAskill (born 1951) is a Scottish journalist. He worked for 22 years on The Guardian, ending his career in September 2018 as the newspaper's defence and intelligence correspondent. MacAskill was involved in preparing the publication disclosures from Edward Snowden of the activities of the American National Security Agency (NSA).

== Career ==
MacAskill was a political editor for The Scotsman for six years (1990–96) before becoming chief political correspondent for The Guardian. In 2007, he was named Washington DC bureau chief.

While based in the United States, he was involved in preparing the Edward Snowden revelations concerning the NSA for publication liaising with Snowden and his contact, Glenn Greenwald, who had brought the story to the attention of then GuardianUS editor Janine Gibson. As a result of his reporting on Global surveillance disclosures, he was named co-recipient of the 2013 George Polk Award. The same reporting also contributed to the Pulitzer Prize for Public Service awarded jointly to The Guardian and The Washington Post in April 2014. MacAskill's retirement from The Guardian was announced on 22 September 2018.

MacAskill is portrayed by British actor Tom Wilkinson in the Edward Snowden biopic Snowden, directed by Oliver Stone and starring Joseph Gordon-Levitt as Snowden.
