= Sergey Muratov (politician) =

Russian politician (born 1964)

- Сергей Муратов
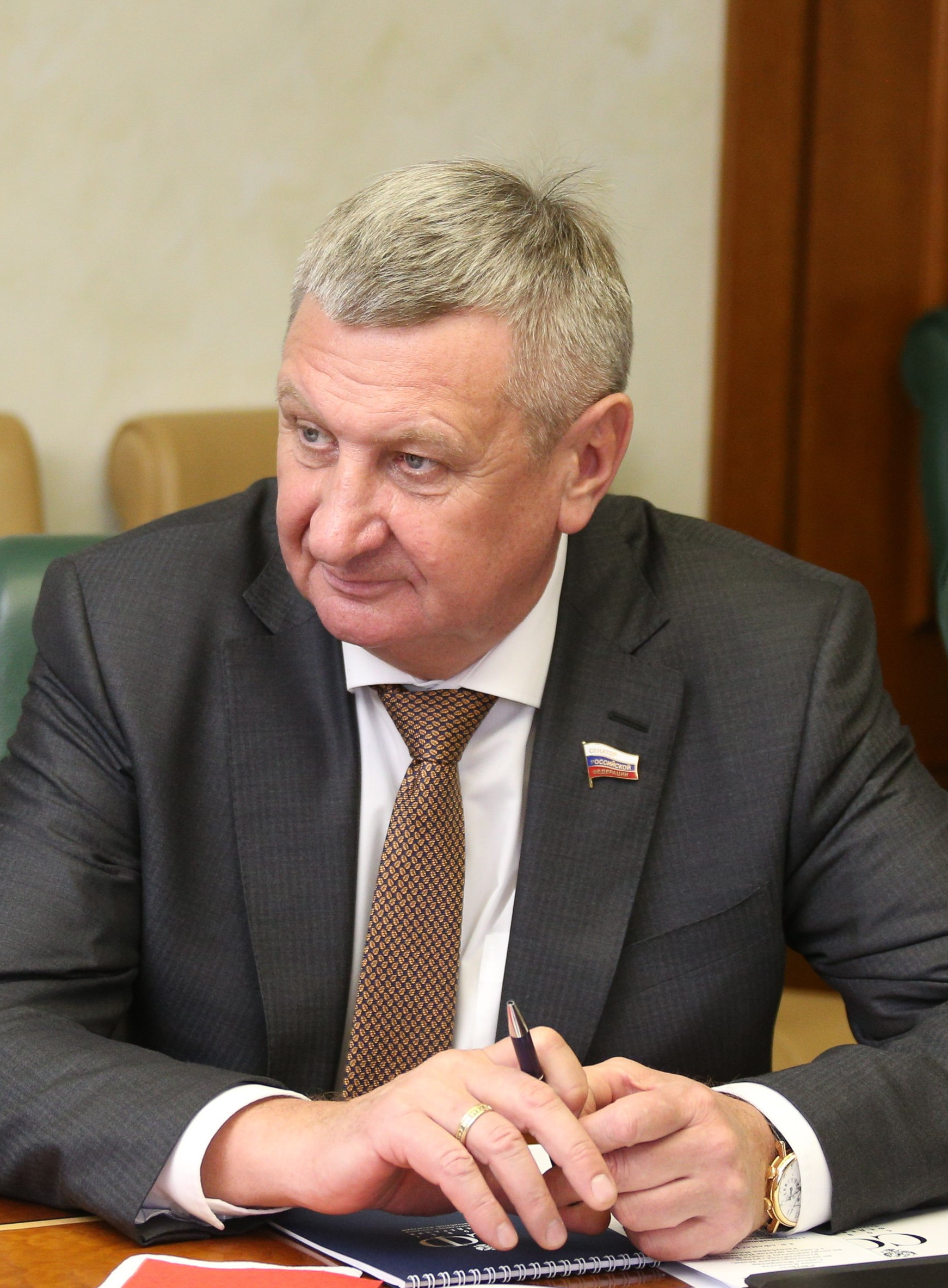

Senator from Kurgan Oblast
- Incumbent
- Assumed office 25 September 2020
- Preceded by: Sergey Lisovsky

Personal details
- Born: Sergey Muratov; 14 January 1964 (age 62) Shchuchye, Shchuchansky District, Kurgan Oblast, Russian Soviet Federative Socialist Republic, Soviet Union
- Party: United Russia
- Education: Kemerovo Technological Institute of Food Industry, KemSU

Sergey Nikolayevich Muratov (Russian: Сергей Николаевич Муратов; born 13 January 1964) is a Russian politician serving as a senator from Kurgan Oblast since 25 September 2020.

== Career ==
Sergey Muratov was born on 13 January 1964 in Shchuchye, Shchuchansky District, Kurgan Oblast. In 1986, he graduated from the Kurgan Agricultural Institute. After graduation, he worked as chief specialist of the enterprise of the agro-industrial complex of the Kurgan Oblast. In 1992 to 1994, Muratov worked as a director of the director of Rosinvestsvyaz LLP. From 1996 to 2002, he was the Director of Zauralsk Fuel and Energy Corporation LLC. On 13 September 2015, he was elected deputy of the Kurgan Oblast Duma of the 6th convocation. On 13 September 2020, he was re-elected for the same position. On 25 September 2020, Muratov was appointed the senator from Kurgan Oblast.

== Sanctions ==
Sergey Muratov is under personal sanctions introduced by the European Union, the United Kingdom, the USA, Canada, Switzerland, Australia, Ukraine, New Zealand, for ratifying the decisions of the "Treaty of Friendship, Cooperation and Mutual Assistance between the Russian Federation and the Donetsk People's Republic and between the Russian Federation and the Luhansk People's Republic" and providing political and economic support for Russia's annexation of Ukrainian territories.
