= Ralph Echemendia =

Cyber security specialist

Ralph (Rafael) Echemendia
- Born: Havana, Cuba
- Occupations: Ethical Hacker, Cyber Security Expert, Public Speaker, Consultant

Ralph (Rafael) Echemendia is a cyber security specialist, who is known as "The Ethical Hacker." He specialises in protecting intellectual property in the entertainment industry and educating on security.

== Early life ==
Echemendia was born in Cuba and raised in the US where he attended Miami Senior High. His first computer was a Commodore 64. He began hacking with it at the age of 14.

== Entertainment industry ==
Echemendia began working in entertainment via investigating the early online leak of an Eminem album.

In 2011, Echemendia was the lead technical investigator on the breach of security that led to The Twilight Saga: Breaking Dawn – Part 1 leaking. He worked to identify the person responsible for leaking behind the scenes pictures and videos of the film, almost a year before the movie’s release.

In 2015, Echemendia worked with Oliver Stone on Snowden, providing technical supervision. He supported the actors by explaining the background to the technical terms in the script. Echemendia and screenwriter Kieran Fitzgerald also worked with Edward Snowden to replicate the actual NSA log-in screen.

In 2016, Echemendia became the hacking consultant to directors and producers of Nerve.
