= Anatoly Kucherena =

Russian lawyer

- Анатолий Кучерена
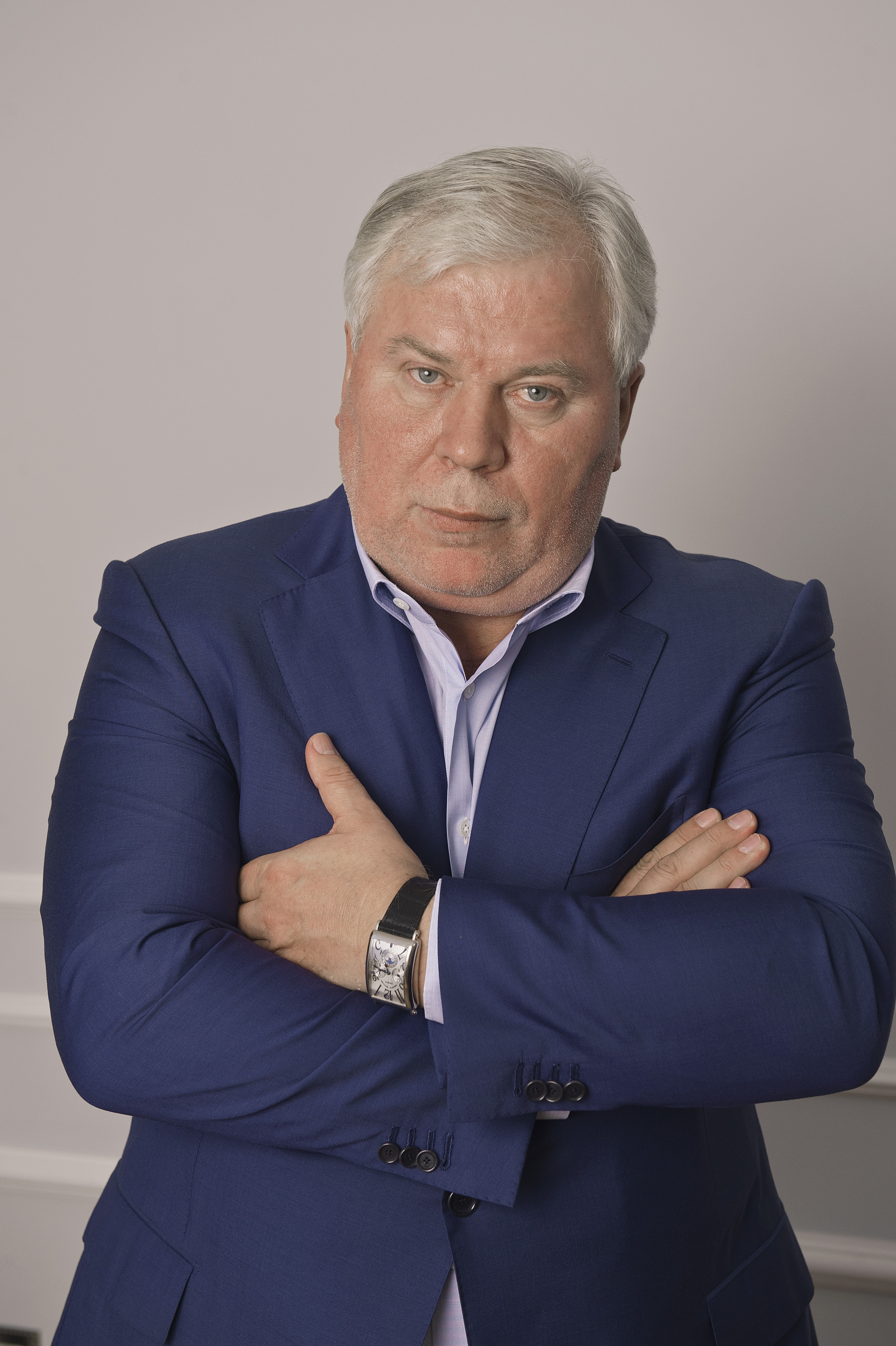
- Kucherena in 2013
- Born: Anatoly Grigorievich Kucherena; August 23, 1960 (age 65); Mîndra, Călărași District, Moldavian SSR, Soviet Union
- Occupation: Lawyer
- Anatoly Kucherena's voice Kucherena on the Echo of Moscow program, 23 September 2013
- Website: Official website

Anatoly Grigorievich Kucherena (Russian: Анатолий Григорьевич Кучерена; born 23 August 1960) is a Russian attorney, public figure, Doctor of Law, and professor. From mid-2013, Kucherena has represented former NSA contractor Edward Snowden's interests in the Russian Federation. Kucherena continues to represent Snowden, pro bono, on an occasional basis. In 2013, according to Izvestia, he was known as a person who spoke in favour of the banning of anonymizer software: advocating the prosecution of its development, distribution and usage by including it in the "malware" software category (a view which contradicts the terminology used in the industry).

In June 2014, American film director Oliver Stone acquired rights to a screen adaptation of Kucherena's novel, Time of the Octopus, the story of fictional American whistleblower Joshua Kold. Threatened by his government and waiting for a decision on his request for Russian asylum, Kold spends three weeks in the transit area of the Moscow airport. Stone said, "Anatoly has written a 'grand inquisitor'-style Russian novel weighing the soul of his fictional whistleblower against the gravity of a 1984 tyranny that has achieved global proportions." The book, the first in a "psychological-political thriller trilogy," was released on 3 March 2015 in Russian and 29 January 2017 in English. The Moscow Times reported that Kucherena said Snowden had received a copy of the book and liked it.

== Background ==
Kucherena was born in the village of Mîndra, Călărași District, Moldova (formerly the Moldavian Soviet Socialist Republic).

In 1979-1981, he did his military service in the Soviet Army (missile troops) serving at the Kapustin Yar and Aralsk launching ranges. He left the service as a squad leader.

In 1991, Kucherena graduated from the All-Union Correspondence Law Institute (now Kutafin Moscow State Law University).

Since 1993, he has been a member of the Moscow City Bar Association. In 1993-1995, he worked at the First Moscow Legal Advice Center where Henri Reznik, a prominent Soviet and Russian lawyer, was his mentor.

Since 26 December 2001, Kucherena has been Head of Chair, Bar and Notariat, Kutafin Moscow State Law University.

In 1995, Kucherena established and became the head of one of the first law offices: Argument Attorneys at Law (since 2003, Kucherena & Partners Law Firm).

Kucherena has been a member of the Public Chamber of the Russian Federation since 2005.

Kucherena has been the Chairman of Public Council at the Ministry of Internal Affairs of the Russian Federation since 2013 the Chairman of the Central Council, the All-Russia Social Movement Civil Society, and the Chairman of the Institute for Democracy and Cooperation (non-profit foundation).

In 1999, Kucherena defended his master’s thesis on, Administrative Justice in Defense of Human and Civil Rights and Freedoms in the Russian Federation.

In 2003, Kucherena became a Doctor of Law, with his thesis entitled, Advocacy Role in Civic Society Formation in Russia.

== High-profile cases and clients ==
Between 1997 and 2001, Kucherena defended Platon Obukhov, a writer and diplomat facing charges of "spying" for the United Kingdom. The court found Obukhov not responsible on the grounds of mental illness and ordered his transfer from prison to a psychiatric clinic. In 2003, he was discharged from the clinic for outpatient treatment.

Between 2000 and 2005, Kucherena represented Tamara Rokhlina, who was charged of murdering her husband, General Lev Rokhlin. In 2000, she was sentenced to eight years imprisonment. The sentence was reversed by the Supreme Court in 2001 and a new four-year suspended sentence was passed in 2005. In the same year, the European Rights Court recognized that Rokhlina’s rights were violated in the investigation: in particular, that she served an excessive term in detention.

At different times, Kucherena has also represented:

- Businessman Sergey Lisovsky (1996, Boris Yeltsin’s electoral campaign funding case);
- Valentin Kovalev, former Minister of Justice of the Russian Federation;
- Nikita Mikhalkov, film director and public figure;
- Singer Iosif (Joseph) Kobzon;
- Businessman Suleyman Kerimov, charged in the Uralkali case in Belarus;
- Grigory Lepsveridze (known as Grigory Leps), a Russian crooner blacklisted in the U.S.A. on accusations of being a money courier for the Brothers’ Circle, a Eurasian criminal organization. The news sparked a public outcry and a petition in support of the singer posted on the U.S. White House website;
- Viktor Yanukovych, fugitive ex-president of Ukraine;
- Edward Snowden, former CIA employee and NSA contractor. As of February 2015, Kucherena represented Snowden pro bono on an occasional basis.

== Criticism and assessments ==
Member of the Public Chamber Nikolai Svanidze considers Kucherena "an excellent lawyer who knows in detail how laws work in Russian conditions. He knows how to defend a person precisely in our conditions, in accordance with our law enforcement practices. And this makes him very effective. He is a decent, honest guy."

The newspaper Novy Vzglyad, tracing Kucherena’s career, wrote on November 18, 2006:

"Anatoly Kucherena is, by and large, the Gagarin of jurisprudence. But not because he has clear blue eyes and a charming, shy childlike smile. Rather, because the path he has traveled in life is quite comparable to a man’s flight into space."

According to State Duma and Moscow City Duma deputy at various times Sergei Mitrokhin, who had approached Kucherena on various pressing issues related to the protection of human rights, no concrete help was ever provided. At the same time, Mitrokhin notes, "his reverent loyalty to the authorities, who are probably interested in him, has always been obvious. And he is interested in them. If this is a person close to the emperor, he will receive increased attention from lawyer Kucherena."

He has been criticized in the press for deliberately choosing only high-profile, resonant cases that are guaranteed in advance to attract significant public interest and media attention.

The radio station Echo of Moscow highlighted Kucherena's media potential, noting that he occupies key positions in Russia on the topic of "Human Rights and the Security Forces." From this perspective, Kucherena is considered an irreplaceable figure when the Kremlin needs to neutralize negativity, resolve a scandal, defuse tension, or minimize damage to the authorities' interests. This also explains Kucherena's active involvement in the Snowden case.
