= Aleksey Kokorin =

Russian statesman and party leader (born 1961)

- Алексей Кокорин
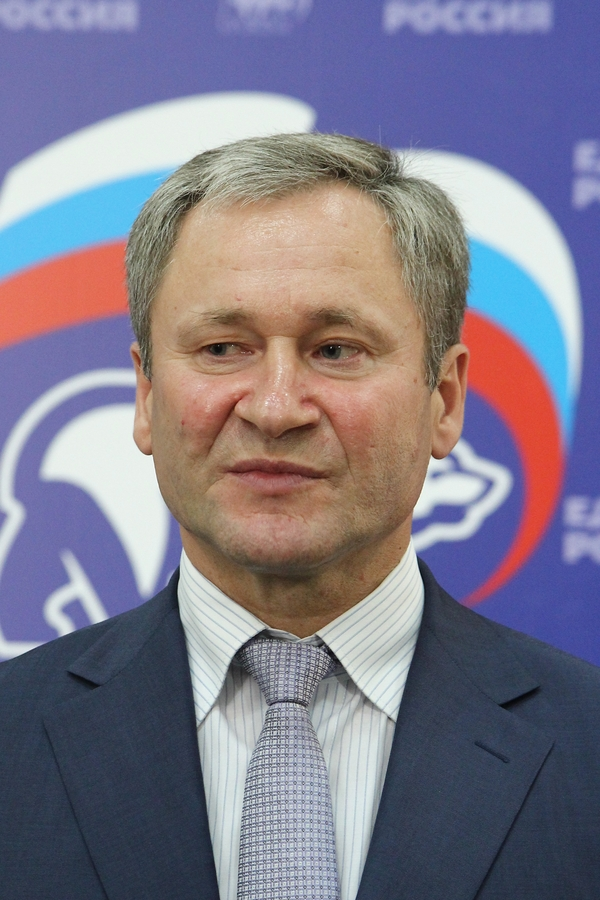
- Kokorin in 2014

4th Governor of Kurgan Oblast
- In office 26 September 2014 – 2 October 2018
- Preceded by: Oleg Bogomolov
- Succeeded by: Vadim Shumkov

Governor of Kurgan Oblast (acting)
- In office 14 February 2014 – 26 September 2014

Head of Shadrinsk
- In office 2 December 1996 – 14 February 2014
- Preceded by: Nikolay Nidzy
- Succeeded by: Igor Ksenofontov (acting)

Personal details
- Born: Aleksey Gennadyevich Kokorin; 1 March 1961 (age 65) Mogilnoye, Russia, Soviet Union
- Party: United Russia

Aleksey Gennadyevich Korokin (Russian: Алексей Геннадьевич Кокорин; born on 1 March 1961) is a Russian statesman and party leader who served as the 4th governor of Kurgan Oblast from 26 September 2014 to 2 October 2018. He was the head of the administration of the city of Shadrinsk from 1996 to 2014. He is a member of the Presidium of the Political Council of the Kurgan regional branch of the United Russia party from 2007 to 2019.

He is currently a member of the board of directors of JSC Atomredmetzoloto.

== Biography ==
Aleksey Kokorin was born on 1 March 1961 in the village of Mogilskoye Kurgan Oblast (present day Glubokoye). There is a version that Kokorin was born on February 28, but the registrars recorded him as born on March 1.

In 1978, he graduated from SPTU-9 of the village of Baturino, Shadrinsky district.

From 1978, he worked at the Olkhovsky state farm.

From 1979 to 1981, he served in the Soviet Army, in the group of Soviet Forces in Germany.

From 1981 to 1986 and 1989 to 1990, he worked in the internal affairs bodies of the city of Shadrinsk.

Between 1986 and 1987, he was a laboratory assistant of the Shadrinsky technical school of physical education.

Between 1987 and 1989, he was a turner at the Shadrinsky Automotive Unit Plant.

From 1990 to 1991, he worked at the plant "Polygraphmash", Shadrinsk. Kokorin was a member of the Communist Party until it was banned in August 1991.

From 1991 to 1996, he was self employed. From July 1991 to 1993, he was deputy director for Commercial Affairs, and a temporary director of the individual private enterprise "Geya", in Shadrinsk. He created a small enterprise "Union of Mercy + Help". From 1993 to December 1996, he was the director of the individual private enterprise "Karina" (sewing fur products).

In one of the biographical books, it is reported that Kokorin graduated from the Kharkov Polytechnic Institute in 1995 with a degree in Industrial Electronics, but this fact is not mentioned in the official biography and in the media.

At the elections on 24 November 1996, Kokorin was elected a deputy of the Shadrinsk City Duma of the II convocation. The head of local government, the mayor of Shadrinsk, headed the work of the Duma. In the elections of 2000, 2004 and 2009, the townspeople again voted for him. At the elections on 28 November 2000, he was elected a deputy of the Shadrinsk City Duma of the III convocation. In the elections of the head of the city of Shadrinsk on 28 November 2004, he received 20,705 votes (77%). In the elections of the Head of the city of Shadrinsk, the head of the Administration of the city of Shadrinsk on 11 October 2009, he received 18,701 votes (84.68%).

In 2000, he graduated from the Moscow State Open University with a degree in jurisprudence.

In 2003, he received his Ph.D. in economics, having defended his thesis at the Chelyabinsk State University on the topic "Model of management of the socio-economic development of a municipal formation".

In from 2007 to 2014, he was the secretary of the Shadrinsk city local branch of the United Russia party. Under his leadership, the number of members of the local branch of the party increased from 900 to 4,200. From 2007 to 7 November 2019, he was a member of the Kurgan Regional Political Council of the United Russia party. He was a member of the Presidium of the Political Council of the Kurgan regional branch of the United Russia Party.

In 2011, together with Aleksandr Iltyakov and Vladimir Medinsky, Kokorin ran for deputies of the State Duma of the Federal Assembly of the Russian Federation of the VI convocation from the United Russia party according to its regional list. Iltyakov was elected.

In the spring of 2013, Kokorin was hospitalize in Israel. However, the worst fears of doctors were not confirmed, and Kokorin returned to his duties.

By presidential decree of 14 February 2014, Kokorin was appointed acting Governor of the Kurgan Oblast. First Deputy Head of Administration Igor Ksenofontov has been appointed acting head of Shadrinsk. Plenipotentiary Representative of the President of the Russian Federation in the Ural Federal District Igor Kholmanskikh introduced the Acting Governor Alexei Kokorin to members of the Government of the Kurgan Oblast, heads of municipalities, deputies, heads of federal structures, representatives of public organizations.

On 17 February 2014, at an extraordinary meeting of the Shadrinsk City Duma of the V convocation, the issue of resignation of Aleksey Kokorin was considered. According to the Charter of the city of Shadrinsk, the first deputy head of the administration Igor Ksenofontov was appointed as the interim head of the city and the administration.

On September 14, 2014, following the voting results in the election of the governor of the Kurgan Oblast, he won a landslide victory, receiving 248,323 votes (84.87%). The candidate from the Communist Party of the Russian Federation Ivan Yevgenov got 8.07%, the candidate from the regional branch of the Liberal Democratic Party Yury Aleksandrov - 4.38%, the candidate from the regional branch of the Patriots of Russia party Igor Ryumin - 0.9% of the votes cast at the polling stations.

On 26 September 2014 at 13:00, the inauguration of the elected governor took place at the Kurgan Regional Philharmonic. He was sworn in office the same day.

From 7 April to 10 November 10, 2015, and from 22 November 2016 to 26 May 2017, he was Member of the Presidium of the State Council of the Russian Federation.

On 2 October 2018, the President of Russia, Vladimir Putin, accepted Kokorin's resignation, at his own request, and Vadim Shumkov was appointed as the acting governor of the Kurgan Oblast until the assumption of office of the person elected governor of Kurgan Oblast.

During the leadership of Kokorin, the region's gross regional product (GRP) grew by 13.84% - from 170 billion 310 million rubles in 2014 to 193 billion 895 million rubles in 2016 (Rosstat; data for 2017 are not published). According to this indicator, in 2014 the region ranked 66th among the subjects of the Russian Federation, in 2016 - 67th. GRP per capita for the same period increased by 15.90% - from 194,979 rubles to 225,984 rubles (66th place in 2014, 67th - in 2016).

Aleksey Kokorin is vice-president of the Association of Small and Medium Cities of Russia, a member of the Council under the President of the Russian Federation for the Development of Local Self-Government, Chairman of the Audit Commission of the Association “Cities of the Urals”, a member of the Board of the Council of Municipal Formations of the Kurgan Oblast.

Since January 2019, he is a member of the Board of Directors of JSC Atomredmetzoloto.

== Personal life ==
Korkorin was devoted in many years to cross-country skiing, athletics, and likes to read Russian classics and biographies of modern politicians.

In May 2015, at the fourth stage of the Russian Cup in the city of Surgut, he fulfilled the standard of the master of sports of Russia in clay pigeon shooting. Order No. 140-ng dated September 30, 2015 awarded the sports title "Master of Sports of Russia".

=== Family ===
He is married to his second wife, Elena Viktorovna Kokorina, and has 2 daughters, Oksana Guryeva, Aleksandra, and a son, Sergey.

Oksana is a candidate of economic sciences. Aleksandra is a student of the Ural Law Academy in Yekaterinburg.

Sergey served two years in the signal troops, received a higher education. On the night of April 28 or 29, 2017 in Shadrinsk, in a state of strong alcoholic intoxication, he stabbed him in the right side, and then in the lower back, stomach and in the arm of his drinking companion. On 8 November 2017, Sergey he was found guilty of committing a crime under paragraph "h" of Part 2 of Art. 111 of the Criminal Code of the Russian Federation "Intentional infliction of grievous bodily harm" with a sentence of imprisonment for a term of 3 years conditionally. The verdict entered into force on November 21, 2017. Sergey paid the victim's treatment costs.
