= Kataysk =

Kataysk (Russian: Катайск) is the name of several inhabited localities in Russia.

Urban localities

- Kataysk, Kurgan Oblast, a town in Kataysky District of Kurgan Oblast

Rural localities

- Kataysk, Tyumen Oblast, a village in Nikulinsky Rural Okrug of Sladkovsky District in Tyumen Oblast
