= Yelena Perminova =

Russian politician (born 1960)

- Елена Перминова
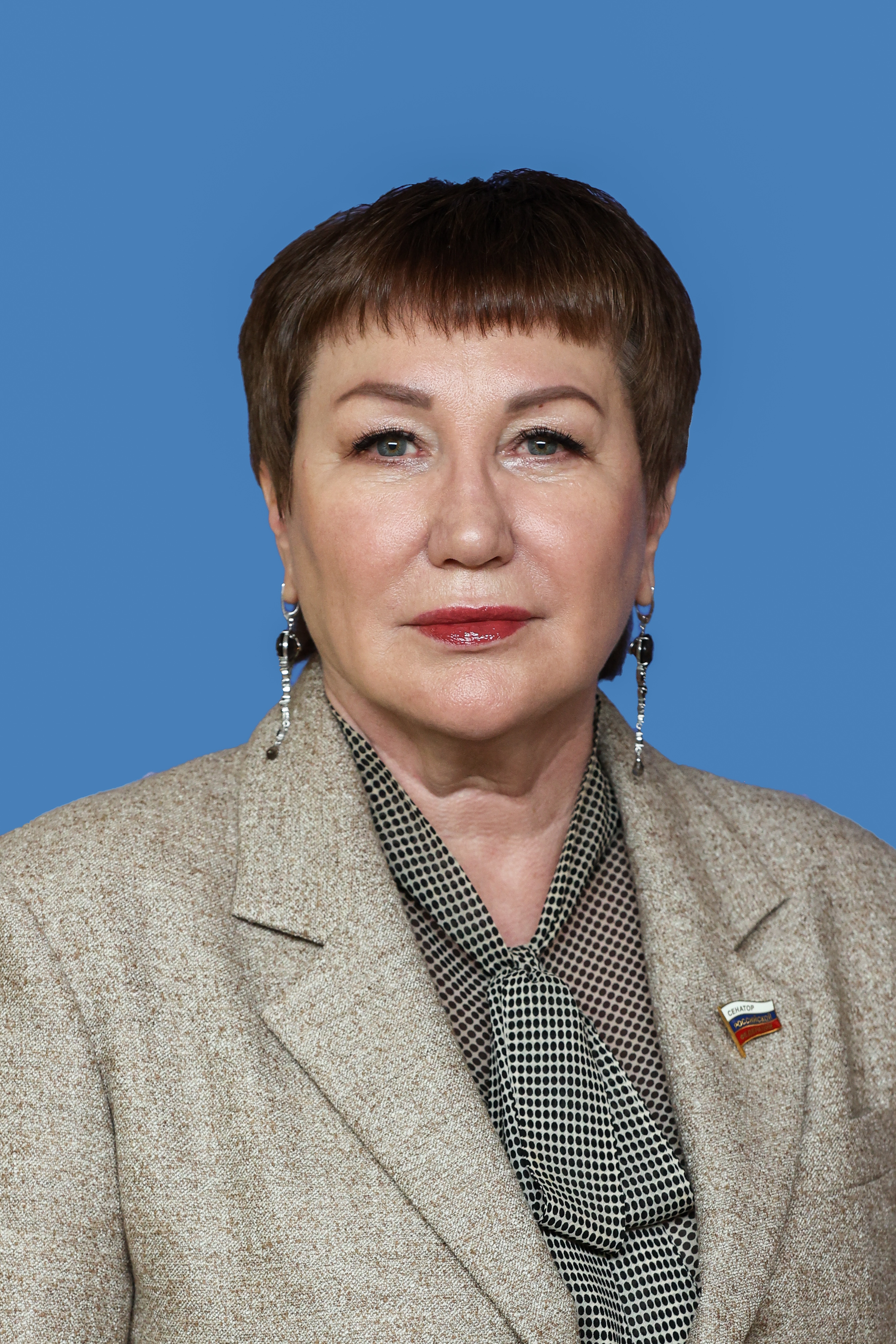

Senator from Kurgan Oblast
- Incumbent
- Assumed office 26 September 2014
- Preceded by: Oleg Panteleyev

Personal details
- Born: Yelena Perminova; 5 December 1960 (age 65) Shatrovsky District, Kurgan Oblast, Russian Soviet Federative Socialist Republic, Soviet Union
- Party: United Russia
- Education: Financial University under the Government of the Russian Federation

Yelena Alekseyevna Perminova (Russian: Елена Алексеевна Перминова; born 5 December 1960) is a Russian politician serving as a senator from Kurgan Oblast since 26 September 2014.

== Career ==
Yelena Perminova was born on 5 December 1960 in Shatrovsky District, Kurgan Oblast. In 1990, she graduated from the Financial University under the Government of the Russian Federation. Afterward, she worked at the Oktyabrsky district financial department of Kurgan. Then she worked for ten years in the financial department of the Pervomaisky District Executive Committee. From 2006 to 2014, Perminova served as the Deputy Governor of the Kurgan Oblast Oleg Bogomolov. On 26 September 2014, she became the senator from Kurgan Oblast.

== Sanctions ==
Yelena Perminova is under personal sanctions introduced by the European Union, the United Kingdom, the USA, Canada, Switzerland, Australia, Ukraine, New Zealand, for ratifying the decisions of the "Treaty of Friendship, Cooperation and Mutual Assistance between the Russian Federation and the Donetsk People's Republic and between the Russian Federation and the Luhansk People's Republic" and providing political and economic support for Russia's annexation of Ukrainian territories.
