= Proposed reforms after the Snowden disclosures =

Reform movement

Various reform proposal have been made in the aftermath of the Snowden disclosures, both legislative and executive.

== Legislative proposals ==
=== Amash–Conyers Amendment ===
The Amash–Conyers Amendment was a proposal to end the "NSA's blanket collection of Americans' telephone records", sponsored by Justin Amash and John Conyers. On July 24, 2013, the House rejected the amendment by a vote of 217 to 205.

=== NSA Inspector General Act ===
The NSA Inspector General Act is a proposed bill introduced by Mark Sanford on October 30, 2013. It would "require the Director of the National Security Agency and the Inspector General of the National Security Agency to be appointed by the President, by and with the advice and consent of the Senate". Currently, the Inspector General is appointed by the Director of the NSA. Supporters of the bill argue that this arrangement "curbs their oversight effectiveness because the Director can remove them."

=== USA Freedom Act ===
The USA Freedom Act (H.R. 2048, Pub. L. 114–23 (text) (PDF)) is a U.S. law enacted on June 2, 2015 that restored in modified form several provisions of the Patriot Act, which had expired the day before. The act imposes new limits on the bulk collection of telecommunication metadata on U.S. citizens by American intelligence agencies, including the National Security Agency. It also restores authorization for roving wiretaps and tracking lone wolf terrorists.

The title of the act originally was a ten-letter backronym (USA FREEDOM) that stood for Uniting and Strengthening America by Fulfilling Rights and Ending Eavesdropping, Dragnet-collection and Online Monitoring Act. The act was originally submitted on October 29, 2013 by Jim Sensenbrenner, author of the Patriot Act, and supported by Senator Patrick Leahy as S. 1599. The bill's stated purpose is: "To rein in the dragnet collection of data by the National Security Agency (NSA) and other government agencies, increase transparency of the Foreign Intelligence Surveillance Court (FISC), provide businesses the ability to release information regarding FISA requests, and create an independent constitutional advocate to argue cases before the FISC."

The Act places new limits on the bulk collection of Americans' metadata, ends the secret laws created by the FISA court, and introduces a "Special Advocate" to represent public and privacy matters to the court.

=== FISA Improvements Act ===
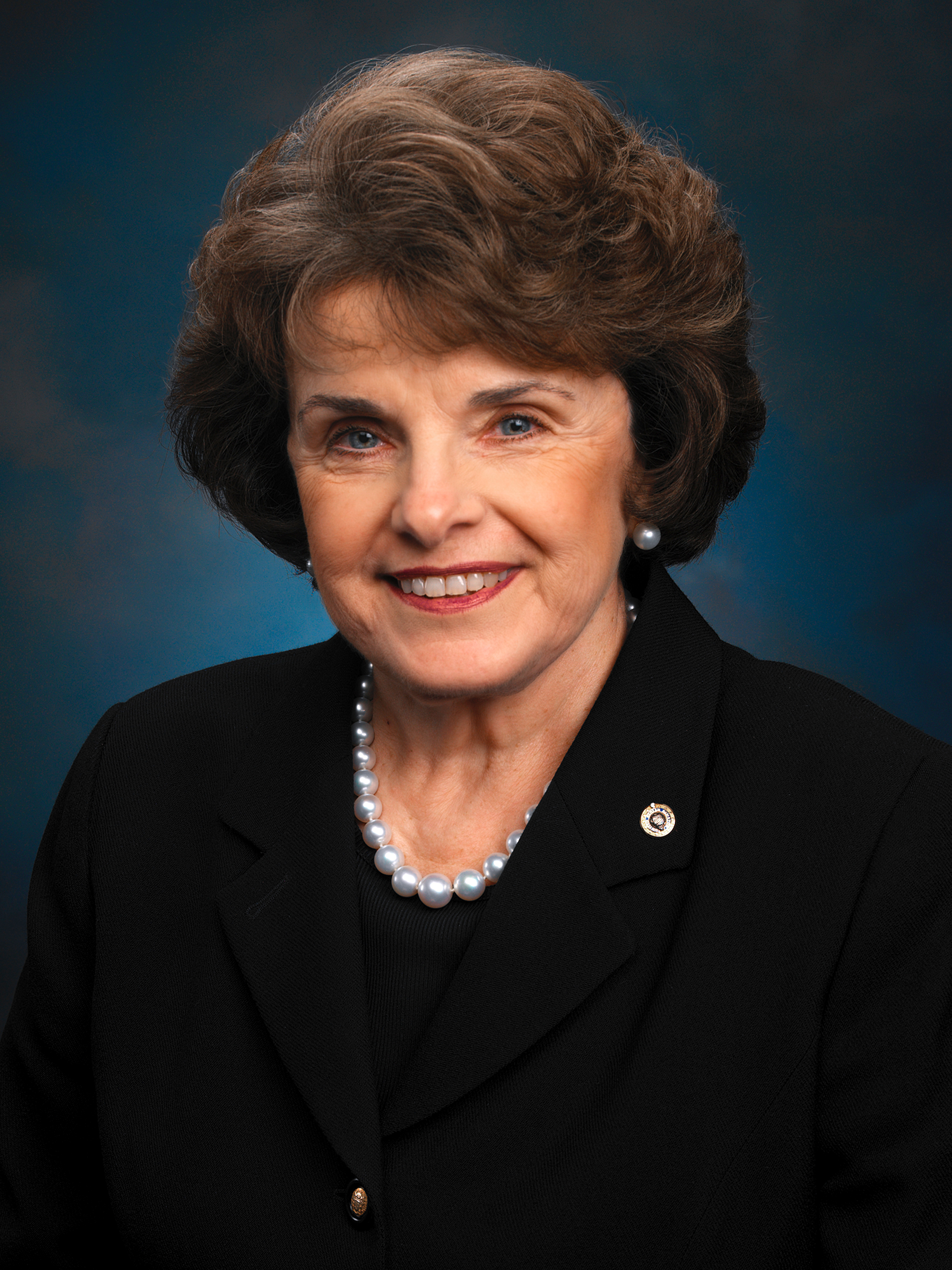
Sen. Dianne Feinstein

The FISA Improvements Act is a proposed act by Senator Dianne Feinstein, Chair of the Senate Intelligence Committee. Prompted by the disclosure of NSA surveillance by Edward Snowden, it would establish the surveillance program as legal, but impose some limitations on availability of the data. Opponents say the bill would codify warrantless access to many communications of American citizens for use by domestic law enforcement.

A statement from multiple Senators on the intelligence committee explains that "this bill would codify the government's authority to collect the phone records of huge numbers of law-abiding Americans, and also to conduct warrantless searches for individual Americans' phone calls and emails."

=== Fourth Amendment Restoration Act ===
The Fourth Amendment Restoration Act is a proposed bill introduced by Senator Rand Paul on June 7, 2013. It "provides that the Fourth Amendment to the Constitution shall not be construed to allow any U.S. government agency to search the phone records of Americans without a warrant based on probable cause." The bill was authored in light of the Global Surveillance Disclosures of 2013, which Sen. Paul said "represents an outrageous abuse of power."

=== Fourth Amendment Protection Act ===
The Fourth Amendment Protection Acts, are a collection of state legislation aimed at bulk data collection. Specific examples include the Kansas Fourth Amendment Preservation and Protection Act and the Arizona Fourth Amendment Protection Act. They are proposed nullification laws. The proposals were made in 2013 and 2014 by legislators in the American states of Utah, Washington, Arizona, Kansas, Missouri, Oklahoma and California. If enacted as law, they would prohibit the state governments from co-operating with the National Security Agency, whose mass surveillance efforts are seen as unconstitutional by the proposals' proponents. Some of the bills would require a warrant before information could be released, whereas others would forbid state universities from doing NSA research or hosting NSA recruiters.

=== Congressional calls for the resignation of James Clapper ===
Excerpt of James Clapper's testimony before the Senate Select Committee on Intelligence

On March 12, 2013, Director James Clapper testified under oath before the Senate Intelligence Committee, the committee charged with oversight of intelligence agencies. In response to the query "Does the NSA collect any type of data at all on millions or hundreds of millions of Americans?" Clapper testified, "No, sir." Senator Wyden pressed, "It does not?", to which Clapper testified "Not wittingly. There are cases where they could inadvertently, perhaps, collect, but not wittingly."

Six members of Congress authored a letter calling for a new Director of National Intelligence, writing:

"The continued role of James Clapper as director of national intelligence is incompatible with the goal of restoring trust in our security programs and ensuring the highest level of transparency. Director Clapper continues to hold his position despite lying to Congress under oath about the existence of bulk data collection programs in March 2013. Asking Director Clapper, and other federal intelligence officials who misrepresented programs to Congress and the courts, to report to you on needed reforms ... is not a credible solution."

United States House of Representatives member Justin Amash has openly accused Clapper of criminal perjury. This sentiment has been echoed by Senator Rand Paul.

Senator Ron Wyden publicly addressed the situation, saying:

Let me start by saying that the men and women of America's intelligence agencies are overwhelmingly dedicated professionals, and they deserve to have leadership that is trusted by the American people. Unfortunately, that trust has been seriously undermined by senior officials' reckless reliance on secret interpretations of the law and battered by years of misleading and deceptive statements that senior officials made to the American people. These statements did not protect sources and methods that were useful in fighting terror. Instead, they hid bad policy choices and violation of the liberties of the American people.

For example, the director of the NSA said publicly that the NSA doesn't hold data on U.S. citizens. That was obviously untrue.

Justice Department officials testified that Section 215 of the Patriot Act is analogous to grand jury subpoena authority, and that deceptive statement was made on multiple occasions.

Officials also suggested that the NSA doesn't have the authority to read Americans' e-mails without a warrant. But the FISA Court opinions declassified last August showed that wasn't true, either.

== Executive proposals ==
=== Director of National Intelligence Review Group ===
The Director of National Intelligence Review Group on Intelligence and Communications Technologies was a review group formed in light of the Global Surveillance disclosure of 2013. In December 2013, the five-member group produced a public report.

=== President Obama speech of January 17, 2014 ===
On January 17, 2014, President Barack Obama gave a public address on mass surveillance. He observed that "totalitarian states like East Germany offered a cautionary tale of what could happen when vast unchecked surveillance turned citizens into informers and persecuted people for what they said in the privacy of their own homes." He continued,"In fact, even the United States proved not to be immune to the abuse of surveillance. In the 1960s government spied on civil rights leaders and critics of the Vietnam War."

He proposed "restricting the use" of collected, but broadly endorsed the bulk data collection activities. Focussing "on surveillance authorized by Congress and overseen by the Foreign Intelligence Surveillance Court" Obama said analysts querying the collection of domestic telephone logs from virtually every American under section 215 of the Patriot Act need first permission from a judge of the secret Foreign Intelligence Surveillance Court who must approve each phone number before said analysts can run a search on this number in the database. He also restricted the range of people who will potentially get caught in the section 215 telephony metadata database and ordered his advisers within 60 days to find a way how to move the database away from government control. The president asked Congress to convene a panel of public advocates to represent consumers before the FISA court and stated there'll be no spying on "dozens" of foreign heads of state or heads of government. Besides reforms aside from those affecting Section 215 include some "protections applied to U.S. citizens abroad will also now be applied to foreign nationals. And companies will be able to make more disclosures about government data requests, including on National Security Letters, which will no longer be secret "indefinitely.""

External videos
- President Obama speech on global surveillance, January 17 2014 (transcript)

==== Reactions ====
The Washington Post noted that "the changes he announced will allow [the NSA] to continue — or expand — the collection of personal data from billions of people around the world, Americans and foreign citizens alike."

Senator Rand Paul criticized the remarks, saying:

While I am encouraged the President is addressing the NSA spying program because of pressure from Congress and the American people, I am disappointed in the details. The Fourth Amendment requires an individualized warrant based on probable cause before the government can search phone records and e-mails. President Obama’s announced solution to the NSA spying controversy is the same unconstitutional program with a new configuration. I intend to continue the fight to restore Americans rights through my Fourth Amendment Restoration Act and my legal challenge against the NSA. The American people should not expect the fox to guard the hen house.

Geoff Neale stated on behalf of the Libertarian Party:

The only way to limit government intrusion into our lives is to eliminate the functions that have little to do with defending individual rights within our borders. If government were restricted only to acting on its one legitimate function — protecting individual rights — 95 percent of government operations would cease to exist.

The Electronic Frontier Foundation and The Day We Fight Back released a report card" of President Obama's speech on NSA reform:

Stop mass surveillance of digital communications and communication records.	.2
Protect the privacy rights of foreigners.	.3
No data retention mandate.	0
Ban no-review National Security Letters.	.5
Stop undermining Internet security.	0
Oppose the FISA Improvements Act.	1
Reject the third party doctrine.	0
Provide a full public accounting of our surveillance apparatus.	.5
Embrace meaningful transparency reform.	0
Reform the FISA court.	1
Protect national security whistleblowers.	0
Give criminal defendants all surveillance evidence.	0

=== Privacy and Civil Liberties Oversight Board report ===
The Privacy and Civil Liberties Oversight Board (PCLOB) is an independent agency within the executive branch. On January 25, the board released a "Report on the Telephone Records Program Conducted under Section 215of the USA PATRIOT Act and on the Operations of the Foreign Intelligence Surveillance Court", a 238-page document on mass surveillance. A majority of the board "deemed the spying illegal and is calling for it to be shut down".

== Non-governmental proposals ==
=== Necessary and Proportional Principles ===
The International Principles on the Application of Human Rights to Communications Surveillance (also called the "Necessary and Proportionate Principles" or just "the Principles") are a collection of principles embodied in a July 2013 report on mass surveillance and human rights.

=== Tech Companies proposal of December 9, 2013 ===
On December 9, 2013, eight tech giants issued an open letter and took out full-page advertisements to publish it. It read in part:

Dear Mr. President and Members of Congress,
We understand that governments have a duty to protect their citizens. But this summer’s revelations highlighted the urgent need to reform government surveillance practices worldwide. The balance in many countries has tipped too far in favor of the state and away from the rights of the individual — rights that are enshrined in our Constitution. This undermines the freedoms we all cherish. It's time for a change.

Google, Microsoft, Apple, Yahoo!, Facebook, Twitter, AOL and LinkedIn participated in the open letter and the associated website, ReformGovernmentSurveillance.com.

== See also ==
- Targeted surveillance
