= Sergey Lisovsky =

Russian politician (born 1960)

Sergey Fedorovich Lisovsky MP
- Сергей Фёдорович Лисовский
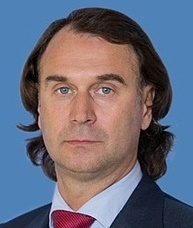

Member of the State Duma (Party List Seat)
- Incumbent
- Assumed office 12 October 2021

Russian Federation Senator from Kurgan Oblast
- In office 29 June 2004 – 25 September 2020
- Preceded by: Andrey Vikharev
- Succeeded by: Sergey Muratov

Personal details
- Born: 25 April 1960 (age 66) Moscow, Russian SFSR, Soviet Union
- Citizenship: Soviet Union; Russia
- Party: CPSU, United Russia
- Spouse: Anna Minayeva
- Children: Maksim (born 1999)
- Education: Moscow Energy Institute
- Occupation: businessman, politician, broadcaster
Awards
Several others (see below)
- Website: http://www.lisovsky.ru/
- Sergey Lisovsky's voice Lisovsky on the Echo of Moscow program, 15 June 2006

Sergey Fedorovich Lisovsky (Russian: Серге́й Фёдорович Лисо́вский; born 25 April 1960, Moscow) is a Russian politician, who was a member of the Federation Council of the Russian Federation in 2004–2020, a representative of the Kurgan Regional Duma. TV host channel RBC TV. In the past - the entrepreneur. Candidate of Philology (2000). Member of the General Council of the party United Russia. It is one of the pioneers of the Russian social and political advertisements and an acknowledged expert on the contemporary electoral technologies.

== Biography ==
Sergey Fyodorovich Lisovsky was born 25 April 1960, in Moscow into a family of physicists. His father, Fyodor Viktorovich Lisovsky known person in the scientific community, Doctor of Physical and Mathematical Sciences, Professor at the Institute of Radio Electronics of the Russian Academy of Sciences. Co-author of one of the most complete dictionary of electronics and other special technical dictionaries. Mother - Inna Fyodorovna Lisovskaya long time worked as a teacher of physics at school, now a housewife.

=== Career ===
After physics and mathematics school № 444 Sergei Lisovsky entered the Moscow Power Engineering Institute, graduating in 1983 in the specialty radiophysics, I was a student disk jockey. From 1983 to 1984 he worked as an engineer at the Central Institute of Radio Engineering, from 1984 to 1987 - was on the Komsomol in the Bauman district committee of the Komsomol in Moscow (the instructor). In 1986, together with the Honored Artist of the RSFSR Yury Chernavsky takes part in the creation of non-public leisure center for youth - a company SPM Record (later - Moscow Studio). In 1989 he registered one of the first in the Soviet Union production companies LIS’S (later Rice-LIS’S), which is engaged in the organization and conduct of various musical concerts.

On 17 June 1995, became a member of the Coordinating Council and a member of the Bureau of the COP of Business Roundtable Russia. In July, he was appointed general director of CJSC ORTV-Advertising. In September, together with Boris Zosimov launched Russia's first music channel Kosmos-10 (currently known as Muz-TV).

In 1996 one of the founders of the creative union of Quinta, the president of the Russian Association of regional TV companies (RART), member of the National Advertising Council. Became a member of staff of the presidential election campaign of Boris Yeltsin and the organizer of a nationwide campaign Vote or Lose. 26 June 1996, was detained together with Arkady Evstafiev, when he tried to take away from the Government House a cardboard box from under the copier to $500 thousand. On 19 October the newspaper New Look was the first assistant of the president of the Russian Federation, head of the Russian President's Security Service Korzhakov published a sensational statement, which indicated that Berezovsky tried to persuade him to kill Lisovsky (and Vladimir Gusinsky, Yuri Luzhkov and Kobzon). Western media responded to the statements Korzhakov.

In early 1997, he tried to leave Russia in the US, but in February, the US Embassy refused to issue him a visa. In September, he became co-chairman of the conciliation committee on the relationship of artists and Tax Service.

On 11 December 1998, the employees of the tax police with the support of the FSB and RUOP staff conducted a series of searches in the office of JSC ORTV-Advertising in the country and in the flat Sergey and seized all the documents and money. Lisovsky's Premier-SV (Russian: «Премьер-СВ») was a competitor of the Yuri Zapol (Russian: Юрий Михайлович Заполь) and Mikhail Lesin associated "Video International" group (Russian: группа «Видео Интернешнл») which, after the collapse of the Lisovsky controlled Premier-SV in December 1998, gained a monopoly on television advertising sales in Russia.

In 1998, he became president of the Association of Managers of music and show business.

In 1999 he became a member of the Board of Directors TV Centr television.

Since 29 June 2004 the representative in the Federation Council of the Kurgan Regional Duma, First Deputy Chairman of the Federation Council Committee on Agrarian and Food Policy and Fishery, a member of the Federation Council Commission on Information Policy.

Since 2013, Lisovsky in the evening on RBC TV conducts the program Capital, in which the guests studio interviews with the same volume of Karl Marx in his hand, from time to time quotes selected place. For Marx himself, according Sergey, he relates with undisguised sympathy, and his thoughts and writings is very instructive and relevant to today's business world.

Lisovsky is actively engaged in social activities in the field of culture - is one of the leaders of the Russian festival Kinotavr, as well as a member of the Public Council for advertising, the president of the Russian Association of Regional TV companies, chairman of the All-Russian Confederation of creative.

He loves risky sports. He is fond of driving a helicopter, mountain climbing, hang gliding, golf, pilotage. In 1995 he participated in the Dakar Rally, finishing 47th in the SUV category.

=== Suspicion of involvement in the murder of Vladislav Listyev ===
During the investigation of Vladislav Listyev murder that happened 1 March 1995, in Moscow, Lisowski was a suspect in a criminal case, his lawyer was Anatoly Kucherena. Lisovsky repeatedly mentioned in the media in connection with the loud murder in a criminal case it repeatedly interrogated, while Lisovsky never hiding from the investigation that set him apart from the alleged operatives of the murder of the organizer - the authority Solntsevo OPG Igor Dashdamirov a and alleged perpetrators, brothers Alexander and Andrey Ageikin. Following the resignation of the prosecutor general of the Russian Federation Yuri Skuratov in 1999, in which were carried out major investigations and established circle of suspects in the press again expanded version of involvement in the crime four main defendants, the first of which was called Lisovsky. According to Skuratov, the investigation was hampered by the Kremlin as the alleged sponsor of the customer was Yeltsin's presidential campaign in 1996.

== Honours and awards ==
- Jubilee Medal "300 Years of the Russian Navy" (1996)
- Medal "In Commemoration of the 850th Anniversary of Moscow" (1997)
- Medal "For efforts in conducting the All-Russian Agricultural Census", Federal State Statistics Service (June 26, 2017)
- Membership in the Sovereign Military Order of Malta

=== Sanctions ===
He was sanctioned by the UK government in 2022 in relation to the Russo-Ukrainian War.
