= Platon Obukhov =

Russian painter (born 1968)

Platon Alexeevich Obukhov (Russian: Платон Алексеевич Обухов; born 9 September 1968 in Moscow, USSR) is a Russian journalist, writer, translator and painter.

== Writer, journalist, translator and painter ==
Platon Obukhov has authored twenty fiction books, including science fiction.

- He has worked for Russian newspapers Izvestia (1988—99), Soviet Sport, and others.
- Obukhov is an abstract painter. His works are at private collections and museums of Moscow, Prague, Berlin, Copenhagen.
- Obukhov is an English-Russian translator. He has translated more than 30 books by English-speaking authors, including books by Emerson Hough, Frederick Remington, Frederick Manfred, George Bird Grinnell, and Martin Gilbert.

== Novels ==
Year of publication	Name (Original/in English)	Genre	Circle
1990	Прыжок Биг Босса	Fantasy
1991	Несостоявшийся шантаж	Science fiction
1994	Охота на канцлера
1994	Роковая женщина
1995	В обьятьях паука	Crime fiction	Gangster
1996	Демон секса	Fantasy
1996	Спарринг со смертью	Science fiction
1996	Антикварное дело	Science fiction
1996	Бог любит блондинок	Fantasy
1996	Королева красоты	Adventure
1997	Нежное убийство	Science fiction
1999	Обратная сторона Луны	Crime fiction
1999	Женская измена	Science fiction
1999	Брызги крови	Fantasy
1999	Счастья на всех не хватит	Crime fiction	Gangster

== Arrest on spying charges ==
In 1996, Obukhov was arrested in Russia on charges of spying for the United Kingdom. Following his re-trial, on 17 May 2002 his conviction was reaffirmed by the Moscow City Court, but the court further found him not responsible on the grounds of mental illness, and ordered him transferred from prison to a psychiatric hospital.
