= Oleg Bogomolov =

Russian politician

- Олег Богомолов
- Bogomolov in 2006

3rd Governor of Kurgan Oblast
- In office 11 December 1996 – 14 February 2014
- Preceded by: Anatoly Sobolev
- Succeeded by: Aleksey Kokorin

Personal details
- Born: 4 October 1950 (age 75) Petukhovo, Kurgan Oblast, RSFSR, USSR
- Party: CPSU (1977–91), United Russia (2004–)

Oleg Alexeyevich Bogomolov (Russian: Оле́г Алексе́евич Богомо́лов; born 4 October 1950) was the governor of Kurgan Oblast, Russia. He was born in Petukhovo in Kurgan Oblast on 4 October 1950. He became a member of the Kurgan Oblast Duma in 1994. He has been governor of Kurgan Oblast since 1996, being re-elected in 2000 and 2004. On 25 December 2009 his candidacy was approved by the regional Duma for vesting the powers of the higher official of the subject of the Russian Federation for the next term, on the proposal of the President of the Russian Federation

== Political Affiliation ==
From 1977 to 1991, he was a member of the Communist Party of the Soviet Union (CPSU). From 1995 to 1996, he was one of the leaders of the regional people's patriotic public association "Narodovlastie" ("People's Power"). Since 2004 to the present, he has been a member of United Russia. He was elected to the Presidium of the United Russia Regional Political Council in Kurgan Oblast. On November 24, 2014, he was removed from the regional political council

== Honors and aw ==
- Certificate of the Interparliamentary Assembly and its bodies — for contribution to strengthening friendship among the peoples of the CIS member states
- Order of St. Sergius of Radonezh, 2nd class (Russian Orthodox Church), awarded on October 4, 2010
- Silver Badge of the Charitable Foundation for the Support of Philharmonic Activities of Kurgan Oblast
- Certificate of Honour of the Commonwealth of Independent States (2001) — for active work in strengthening and developing the CIS
- Honorary Citizen of Kurgan Oblast (February 3, 2017)
