= Kurgan Oblast Duma =

Regional parliament of Kurgan Oblast, Russia

Coordinates: 55.4400°N 65.3422°E

Kurgan Oblast Duma Курганская областная дума
- 7th legislature

Type
- Type: Unicameral

Leadership
- Chairman: Dmitry Frolov, United Russia since 29 September 2015

Structure
- Seats: 34
- Political groups: United Russia (29) CPRF (1); LDPR (1); A Just Russia (1); New People (1) Party of Pensioners (1)

Elections
- First election: 27 March 1994
- Last election: 13-14 September 2025
- Next election: 2030

Meeting place
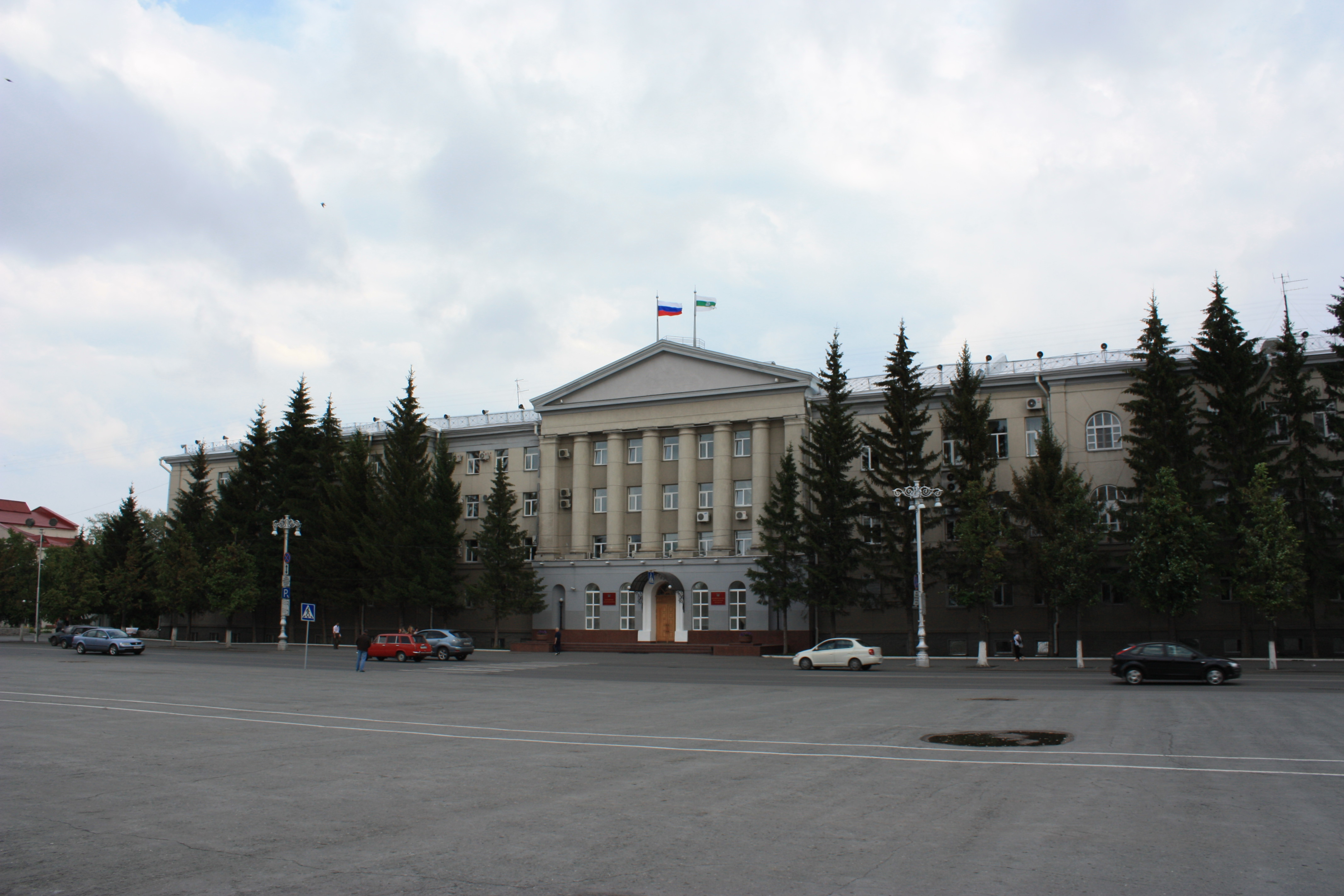
- 56 Gogol Street, Kurgan

The Kurgan Oblast Duma (Russian: Курганская областная дума, romanized: Kurganskaya oblastnaya duma) is the regional parliament of Kurgan Oblast, a federal subject of Russia. It consists of a total of 34 deputies who are elected for five-year terms.

== Elections ==
=== 2015 ===
Party	Seats
United Russia	28
Communist Party of the Russian Federation	2
Liberal Democratic Party of Russia	2
A Just Russia	2

=== 2020 ===
Party	Seats
United Russia	27
Communist Party of the Russian Federation	3
Liberal Democratic Party of Russia	2
A Just Russia	1
Party of Pensioners	1

=== 2025 ===
Party	%	Seats
United Russia	54.91	29
Liberal Democratic Party of Russia	12.85	1
Communist Party of the Russian Federation	10.69	1
New People	7.37	1
Russian Party of Pensioners for Social Justice	6.24	1
A Just Russia	5.87	1
Registered voters/turnout	38.32	

== Chairmen ==
	Name	Period
1st convocation	Oleg Bogomolov	1994—1996
2nd convocation	Lev Yefremov	1996—2000
3rd convocation	Valery Ponomaryov	2000—2004
4th convocation	Marat Islamov	2004—2010
5th convocation	Vladimir Kazakov; Vladimir Khabarov	2010—2012; 2012—2015
6th convocation	Dmitry Frolov	2015—2020
7th convocation	Dmitry Frolov	2020—present

== Sources ==
- The official website of Kurgan Oblast Duma. History (in Russian)
