= Glossary of Russian and USSR aviation acronyms: Organisations =

This is a glossary of acronyms and initials used for organisations in the Russian Federation and formerly the USSR. The Latin-alphabet names are phonetic representations of the Cyrillic originals, and variations are inevitable.

== Organisations ==
Aerogeologiya

- Аэрогеология

Aero-geological Industrial Association

AGOS

[otdel] Aviatsii, Ghidroaviahtsii i Opytnovo Samolyotostroyeniya - [section for] aviation, hydro-aviation and experimental construction

AKDON

Aviatsionnaya Krasnoznamyonnaya Diviziya Osobogo Naznacheniya - Red Banner Special Task Aviation Division

Amtorg

- organisation for importing and licensing American products

ANPK MiG

Aviatsionnyy Nauchno-proizvodstvennyy Kompleks MIG – aviation science and production complex MiG

ANTK

Aviatsionnyi Nauchno-Teknichyeskii Kompleks – Aviation scientific-technical complex

ANTK Tupolev

Aviatsionnyi Nauchno-Teknichyeskii Kompleks – Tupolev aviation scientific-technical complex

ARZ

AviaRemontnyy Zavod – aircraft repair factory

AVF

Akademiya Vozdushnogo Flota – air fleet academy

Aviaarktika

– independent Arctic directorate of Aeroflot

Aviaeskadril'ya

– squadron part of an LO

Aviaeksport

- all-union aviation export agency

Aviakhim

Aviatsiya i Khimiya - Voluntary Society for Assistance to the Soviet Aircraft and Chemical Industry

AVIAVnito

– Vnito aviation department of the all-union scientific and technical research organisation

Aviatrest

Gosudarstvenniy Trest Aviatsionniy Promishlennosti - State Aviation Industry Trust

Aviatrust

- central aviation management organisation Sept 1923

BNK

Byuro Novykh Konstruktsiy - bureau of new designs

BNT

Byuro Novoy Tekhniki - bureau of new technology NKAP

BOK

Byuro Osobykh Konstruktsiy - bureau of special design

CAHI

– see TsAGI

CCB

– see TsKB

CIAM

– see TsIAM

CNII

– see TsNII

CUMVS

– see TsUMVS

Cheka

– secret police 1918-22 became OGPU

DEKA

- (Dyuflon & Konstaninovich factory)

Deruluft

- Deutsche Russki Air German/Russian airline 1922

DMZ

Dolgoprudnenskiy Mashinostroitel'nyy Zavod – Dolgoproodnyy Machinery Factory

Dobrolyet

Russian airline 1922

DOSAAF

Dobrovol'noe Obschestvo Sodesystviya Armii Aviatcii i Flotu - voluntary society for assistance to the army, air force and navy

EMZ

Eksperimentahl'nyy Mashinostroitel'nyy Zavod - experimental machinery factory

FAPSI

Federal'noye Agentstvo Pravitel'stvennoy Svyazi i Informatsii – federal agency of government communications and information

FLA RF

Federatsiya Lyubiteley Aviatsii Rossiyskoy Federatsii – aviation enthusiasts federation of Russia

GAZ

Gosudarstvenny Aviatsionnyy Zavod – state aviation plant/factory

GDL

Gazodinamicheskaya Laboratoriya - Gas Dynamics Laboratory

GEEI

Gosudarstvenny Elektro-Energeticheskiy Institut - State Institute of Electricity and Energy

GIRD

Gosudarstvenny Institoot po Raketnoy Dvigatel'naya - group for studying reaction engines

GIRT

Gosudarstvenny Institut po Raketnoy Tekhnike – state institute for rocket technology

GK NII VVS

Gosudarstvenny Krasnoznamyonnyy Naoochno-Issledovatel'skiy Institoot Grazhdahnskoy Aviahtsii - state red banner air forces research institute

GKAP

Gosudarstvenny Komitet Po Aviatsionnoy Promyshlennosti - state committee on aviation industry

GKAT

Gosudarstvenny Komitet Po Aviatsionny Tekhnike - state committee on aircraft technology

GKO

Gosudarstvenniy Komitet Oborony - state defence committee

GKRE

Gosudarstvenny Komitet Po Rahdioelektronike – state committee for electronic equipment

Glavkoavia

Glavnoe Pravlenie Obédinennikh Aviapromishlennikh – Chief Directorate of united aviation industry factories

Glavsyevmorput

– Main Directorate of northern sea routes

GLITs

Gosudarstvenny Lyotno-Ispytahtel'nyy Tsentr – state flight test centre formerly GNIKI VVS

GNIKI VVS

Gosudarstvenny Nauchno-Ispytatel'ny Krasnoznamenny Institut VVS – State research test institute for the air forces

GosNII AS

Gosudarstvenny Nauchno-Issledovatel'skiy Institut Aviatsionnykh Sistem - state scientific research institute for aircraft systems

GosNII GA

Gosudarstvenny Nauchno-Issledovatel'skiy Institut Grazhdahnskoy Aviahtsii - state scientific research institute for civil aviation replaced Gos NII GVF

GosNII GVF

Gosudarstvenny Nauchno-Issledovatel'skiy Institut Grazdahnskovo Vozdooshnovo Flota - state scientific research institute for civil air fleet

GosNII VVS

Gosudarstvenny Nauchno-Issledovatel'skiy Institut Grazhdahnskoy Aviahtsii - state air forces research institute

GosNIPAS

Gosudarstvenny Nauchno-Ispytatel'nyy Poligon Aviatsionnykh System - state research and test range for aircraft systems

GOST

Gosudarstvenny Standart - state standard

GOZ

Gosudarstvenny Optnyy Zavod – State Experimental Plant

GROS

- civil experimental aeroplane construction

GSOKB

Gosudarstvennoye Soyooznoye Opytno Konstrooktorskoye Byuro – State Union experimental design/construction bureau

GSPI-7

GSPI-7 institute

GSZ

Gosudarstvennyy Soyuznyy Zavod – State Union factory

GUAP

- ГУАП

Главное управление авиационной промышленности - Glavnoye upravleniye uviatsionnoy promyshlennosti - Chief directorate of the aviation industry

GU GVF

- ГУ ГВФ

Главное управление гражданского воздушного флота - Glavnoye upravleniye grazhdanskovo vozdushnogo flota – Chief directorate of the civil air fleet

GU SMP

Glavnoye Upravleniye Severnogo Morskogo Puti- main directorate of the northern sea route

GU VP

Glavnoye Upravleniye Voyenno Promishlennosti- main directorate of military industry

GU VVS

Glavnoye Upravleniye Voyenno-Vozdushnykh Sil- main directorate of air force

GVF

Grazdanskiy Vozdushniy Flot- civil air fleet

IAM

– see TsIAM

IMET

- metallurgical institute

IPE

Institut Promishlennoy Energetiki - institute of industrial power engineering

KAI

- Kazan aviation institute

KB KhIMMASH

- A. M. Isayev Chemical Engineering Design Bureau (Russian: Конструкторское бюро химического машиностроения имени A. M. Исаева)

KBR

Konstruktorskoye Byuro Radiostroyeniya – experimental design/construction bureau

KB VT

Konstruktorskoye Byuro 'Vnutrenn'aya Tyur'ma - Internal Prison Design Bureau

KGB

Komitet Gosudarstvennoy Bezopasnosti – state security committee

KhAI

Kharkovskii Aviatsionny Institut - Kharkov aviation institute

KhTZ

Kharkovskii Traktorniy Zavod - Kharkov tractor factory

KiAPO

Kievskoye Aviatsionnoye Proizvodstvennoye Ob"yedineniye – Kiev Aircraft Production Association

KiAZ

Kievskiy Aviazavod – Kiev Aircraft Factory

KIIGA

- Kiev Institute of civil aviation engineering

KMPO

Kazanskoe Motorostroitelnoe Proizvodsvennoe Obédinenie - Kazan Engine-building production Enterprise

KMZ

'Trood' Kiyevskiy Mashinostroitel'nyy Zavod 'Trud' - 'Labour' Kiev Manufacturing plant

KO

Komitet Oboroni - defence committee

KOMTA

Komissiya po Tyazhyeloi Aviatsii - commission for heavy aviation

Komsomol

Kommunisticheskiy Soyuz Molodezhi - young communists union

KOMZ

Krasnogorskiy Optiko-Mekhanicheskiy Zavod – Krasnogorsk optics and machinery plant

KOSOS

Konstruktorskiy Otdel Sektora Opytnogo Stroitel'stva - section of experimental aeroplane construction

LIG

Leningrahdskiy Institut Grazhdahnskovo [vozdooshnovo flota] – Leningrad Civil Air Fleet Institute

LII (or LII NKAP)

Letno-Issledovatel'skiy Institut (Letno-issledovatelʹskiy institut, Narodnyy Komissariaht Aviatsionnoy Promyshlennosti) - flight research institute (of the state commissariat for aviation industry)

LIiDB

Letnoispytatel'naya i Dovodochnaya Baza – design bureau flight test and mod facility

LIIPS

- Leningrad institute for sail and communications engineers

LNPO Leninets

Leningradskoye Nauchno-Proizvodstvennoye Obyedineniye – Leningrad Scientific & Production Association

LO

Letnyy Otryad – flight detachment [of an OAO]

MAI

Moskovskii Aviatsionii Institut imeny Sergo Ordjoniidze - Moscow aviation institute (named after Sergo Ordjoniidze)

MAP

Ministerstvo Aviatsionnoy Promyshlennosti - ministry of aviation industry

MAPO MiG

Moskovskoe Aviatsionnoye Proizvodstvennoye Obyedineniye – Moscow aircraft production association MiG

MARZ

Moskovskiy Aviaremontnyy Zavod – Moscow Aircraft Overhaul Plant

MATI

Moskovskii Aviatsionii Technologicheskii Institut - Moscow aviation technological institute

MchS Rossii

- EMERCOM Russia

MGA

Ministerstvo Grazhdanskoy Aviahtsii – ministry of civil aviation

MGVF

Ministerstvo Grazdanskogo Vozdooshnogo Flota - ministry of civil aviation

MIREA

- Moscow institute of electronics

MMKB

Moskovskoye Mashinostroitel'noye Konstruktorskoye Byuro – Moscow mechanical engineering design bureau

MMZ

Moskovskiy Mashinostroitel'nyy Zavod – Moscow machine-building plant

MNIIP

Moskovskiy Naoochno-Issledovatel'sky Institoot Priborostroyeniya – Moscow research institute of instrument engineering

MosGIRD

Moskovskaya Gruppa po Izucheniyu Reaktivnogo Dvizheniya - Moscow group for studying reactive movement

MOM

Ministerstvo Oboronnoy Mashinostroyeniya – ministry of general machinery

MOP

Ministerstvo Oboronnoy Promyshlennosti – ministry of defence industry

MOS VAO

- all-union association for experimental marine aircraft

MRP

Ministerstvo Rahdioelektronnoy Promyshlennosti – ministry of electronics industry

MVD

- ministry for internal affairs 1946-53

MVK NLGS

Mezhvedomstvennaya Komissiya [po soglasovaniyu] Norm Lyotnoy Godnosti Samolyotov – inter-department airworthiness regulations co-ordinating commission

MVTU

Moskva Vyssheye Tekhnicheskoye - Moscow higher technical school

NAL

Nauchno-Avtomobilnaya Laboratoriya - scientific auto-mobile laboratory

NAMI

Nauchnyy avtomotornyy Institut - scientific auto-motor institute

NAPO

Novosibirskoye Aviatsionnoye Proizvodstvenniye Obyedineniye – Novosibirsk aircraft production association

Narkomavprom

- supreme directorate of aviation industry [became GUAP]

NAZ

Nizhegorodskiy AviaZavod – Nizhniy Novgorod aircraft factory

NIAI

Nauchno-Issledovatel'skiy Aero-Institut - scientific research aero-institute

NIAT

Nauchno-Issledovatel'skiy Institut Aviatsionnykh Teknologiy – scientific research institute of aviation technologies

NIEI PDS

Nauchno-Issledovatel'skiy i Eksperimenahl'nyy Institut Parashootnodesahntnykh Sistem – Parachute Delivery systems Research and Experimental Institute

NI PAV

Nauchno-Issledovatel'skiy Poligon Aviatsionnogo Vooruzheniya - research test range of aircraft armament

NII

Nauchno-Issledovatel'skiy Institut - scientific research institute more than 30 such as NII VVS,

NII AO

Nauchno-Issledovatel'skiy Institut Aviatsonnogo Oborudovaniya – avionics scientific research institute

NII AS

Nauchno-Issledovatel'skiy Institut Aviatsonnykh Sistem – aircraft systems scientific research institute

NII AD GVF

Nauchno-Issledovatel'skiy Institut Aviadvigateley Grazdahnskovo Vozdooshnovo Flota - civil air fleet scientific research institute for aero-engines

NII DVS

Nauchno-Issledovatel'skiy Institut Dvigateley Vnutrennego Sgoraniya - scientific research institute for internal combustion engines

NII GKRE

Nauchno-Issledovatel'skiy Institut Gosoodarstvennovo Komteta po Rahdioelektronike – state scientific research institute for electronics

NII GVF

Nauchno-Issledovatel'skiy Institut Grazdahnskovo Vozdooshnovo Flota - civil air fleet scientific research institute

NIIKhIMMash

Nauchno-Issledovatel'skiy Institut KhIMMash - scientific research institute for KhIMMash

NII P

Nauchno-Issledovatel'skiy Institut Priborostroyeniya - scientific research institute for fine instruments

NII R

Nauchno-Issledovatel'skiy Institut Rahdiostroyeniya - scientific research institute for radio equipment

NII TP

Nauchno-Issledovatel'skiy Institut Tochnykh Priborov - scientific research institute for fine instruments

NII VVS

Nauchno-Issledovatel'skiy Institut Voyenno-Vozdooshnykh Seel – air force scientific research institute

NII VVS KA

Nauchno-Issledovatel'skiy Institut Voyenno-Vozdushnykh Sil Krasnoy Armii – Red Army air force scientific research institute

NIO

Nauchno-Issledovatel'skoye Otdeleniye (Otdel) – research division (section)

NITsEVT

Nauchno-Issledovatel'skiy Tsentr Elektronno-Vychislitel'skiy Tekhniki – electronic/computing equipment research centre

NK VVS

Narodnyy Komissariat Voyenno-Vozdushnykh Sil - people's commissariat for the Soviet air force

NK/NTK UVVS

Narodnyy Komissariat/Nauchno-Tekhnicheskiy Komitet Upravleniya Voyenno-Vozdushnykh Sil - people's Scientific committee/Scientific technical committee of the Soviet air force directorate

NKAP

Narodnyy Komissariat Aviatsionnoy Promyshlennosti - people's commissariat for aviation industry

NKB

Narodnyy Komissariat Boyepripasov – people's commissariat of ordnance

NKEP

Narodnyy Komissariat Elektricheskoy Promyshlennosti - people's commissariat for electrical engineering

NKO

Narodnyy Komissariat Oborony - people's commissariat for defence

NKOP

Narodnyy Komissariat Oborony Promyshlennosti - people's commissariat for defence industry

NKTP

Narodnyy Komissariat Tyazheloy Promyshlennosti - people's commissariat for heavy industry

NKVD

Narodnyy Komissariat Vnutrennikh Del - people's commissariat for internal affairs 1934-46 became MVD

NKVM

Narodnyy Komissariat po Voenim i Morskim Delam - people's commissariat for military and naval affairs

NKVT

Narodnyy Komissariat Vneshney Torgovli - people's commissariat for foreign trade

NOA

Nauchno Opitniy Aerodrom - scientific experimental airfield

NPO

Nauchno-Proizvodstvennoe Ob'edinenie – Scientific and production corporation

NPO Roodgheofizika

Nauchno-Proizvodstvennoe Ob'edinenie Roodgeofizika – Scientific and production corporation Rudgeofizika

NPP Aerosila

- Aeropower Research & Production Enterprise

OALID

Otdel Aerodinamicheskiy Letnykh Ispytaniy i Dovodok – department of aerodynamics, flight test and development

OAK

Obyedinennaya Aviastroitel'naya Korporatsiya – united aircraft manufacturing corporation

OAO

1. Obyedinyonnyy Aviaotryad – united flight detachment [of a UGA]
2. Otdel'nyy Aviaotryad – independent flight detachment [government airline]
3. Otkrytoye Aktsionehrnoye Obshchestvo [Tupolev] – Tupolev Public limited Company
4. OAO Ipromashprom

OAPO

Omskoye Aviatsionnoye Proizvodstvennoye Ob"yedineniye 'POLET' - flight production association in Omsk

OAVUK

- society for aviation and gliding of Ukraine and Crimea

ODVF

Obshchestvo Druzey Vozdushnogo Flota- society of friends of the air fleet

OGPU

Ob'edinyonnoye Glavnoe Politicheskoe Upravlenie - united governmental political administration 1922-34 head Menzhinskii, became NKVD

OKB

Опытное конструкторское бюро - Opytno Konstrooktorskoye Byuro – experimental design/construction bureau

OKBM

Opytno Konstrooktorskoye Byuro Motorostroeniya – experimental design/construction bureau for motor construction (modern acronym)

OKBM

Opytno Konstrooktorskoye Byuro Mashinostroeniya – experimental design/construction bureau for machine construction (early version of OKB)

OKO

Opytno-konstruktorskoye - experimental design section Kiev Tairov

OLAGA

Ordena Lenina Akademiya Grazhdahnskoy Aviatsii – Leningrad Civil Aviation Academy decorated with the Order of Lenin

OMO

Opitno-Motorniy Otdel- experimental motor department

OMOS

- department of marine experimental aircraft construction

OND

Otdel Neftyanikh Dvigateley- department of crude oil engines

OOK

- department of special construction

OOS

Otdel Opytnogo Samolyetostroeniya - section for experimental aircraft construction

OPO

Opytnyy Otdel - experimental department

Osoaviakhim

Obshchestvo Sodeystviya Aviatsii i Khimii- society for assistance to aviation and chemical industry

OSGA

OSK

- department for special construction

OSO

Obshchestvo sodeystviya Oborone – Defence Enhancement Society

OSS

Otdel Sookhoputnykh Samolyotov - department for experimental land-plane construction

Ostekhburo

Osoboe tekhnicheskoe byuro po voennym izobreteniyam spetsialnogo naznacheniya (Особое техническое бюро по военным изобретениям специального назначения - Остехбюро) special technical bureau for military inventions - c. 1921 to 1937

OSVOD

Obshchestvo Spasaniya na Vodakh – Nautical Rescue Agency

OTB

Osoboe Technicheskoye Byuro – special technical bureau

OTL

Otdel Tekhnologicheskikh Laboratoriy – technical laboratories section

OVI

- department of war intervention of RKKA

PA

Polyarnaya Aviatsiya – polar aviation

PINRO

Polyarnyy Institut Morskovo Rybnovo Khozyaystva I Okeanografii – polar institute of oceanic fishery and oceanography

PPOM

Permskoye Proizvodstvennoye Ob"yedineniye Motorostroyeniya – Perm engine production association

Promvoensovet

Soviet Voennoy Promishlennostii – council of the defence industry

RAM

Russkii Aviatsonniy Motor – Russian aviation motor

RBVZ

Rusko-Baltiyskiy Vagonniy Zavod – Russo-Baltic Wagon Factory

Revvoensovet

Revolutsionniy Voenniy Sovet – revolutionary military council

RIB

Raschetno-Ispyatelnoye Byuro – Calculation and Testing Office

RIIGA

Rizhskiy Institut Inzhenerov Grazhdahnskoy – Riga Civil Aviation Engineers Institute

RKBM

Rybinskoye Konstruktorskoye Byuro Motorostroyeniya – Rybinsk motor constructors bureau

RKIIGA

Rizhskiy Krasnoznamennyy Institut Inzhenerov Grazhdahnskoy Aviatsii – Red Banner institute of civil aviation engineers

RKKVF

Raboche-Krestyanskoy Krasnoy Armii - Vozdushniy Flot – Workers' and peasants' red army air fleet

RNII

Raketnyy Nauchno-Issledovatel'skiy Institut - reaction engine scientific research institute

ROSTO

Rossiyskoye Oboronnoye Sportivno-tekhnicheskoye Obschchestvo – russian Defence Sports and Technical Society Post USSR split

RPKB

Ramenskoye Priborno-Konstruktorskoye Byuro – Ramenskoye instrument design bureau

RSFSR

- Russian Federation

RSK MiG

Rossiyskaya Samolyotostroitel'naya Korporatsiya – Russia aircraft construction corporation MiG

RVS

Revolutsionniy Voenniy Sovet (or Revvoensovet) – revolutionary military council

SibNIA

Sibirskiy Nauchno-Issledovatel'skiy Institut Aviatsii – Siberian aeronautical research institute

SKB

1. Spetsiahl'noye Konstruktorskoye Byuro – special design/construction bureau
2. Studencheskoye Konstruktorskoye Byuro - student construction bureau
3. Syerinoye Konstruktorskoye Byuro – series design/construction bureau

SKB RPD VAZ

Spetsiahl'noye Konstruktorskoye Byuro Rotorno-Porshnevikh Dvigateley Volzhskogo Avtomobilnogo Zavoda – special design/construction bureau for Wankel rotary engines of the Volga automoile factory

SKBM

Stupinskoye Konstruktorskoye Byuro Mashinostroyeniya – Stupino Machinery Design Bureau

SKO

Seriyno-Konstruktorskiy Otdel – Production Design Department

SNII

Samolyet Nauchno-Issledovatel'skiy Institut - aeroplane scientific research institute GVF

SNK

Sovet Narodnykh Komissarov – council of peoples commissars – soviet government

SOS

Sektor Opytnogo Stroitel'stva – prototype construction section

Sovnarkhom

Sovet Narodnikh Komissarov – council of people's commissars

Sovnarkhoz

Sovet Narodnogo Khozyaystva –council of national economy

SP

Severnyy Polyus – north pole

STO

Sovet Truda i Oboroni – council of labour and defence

TAPO

Tashkentskoye Aviatsionnoye Proizvodstvennoye Ob"yedineniye – Tashkent aircraft production association

TKB

Tul'skoye Konstruktorskoye Byuro – Tula design bureau

TMZD

Taganrogskiy Mashinostroitel'nyy Zavod Imeni Georgiya Dimitrova – Taganrog Machinery plant no.86 named after Gheorgiya Dimitriova

TO EKU (of) OGPU

Tekhnicheskiy Otdel Ekonomicheskogo Upravleniya Ob'edinyonnoye Glavnoe Politicheskoe Upravlenie - technical department of the economic directorate of the special governmental political administration

TsAGI

Центра́льный аэрогидродинами́ческий институ́т (ЦАГИ) Tsentralniy Aerogidrodinamicheskiy Institut, the Central Aerohydrodynamic Institute
Tsentral'nyy Aerodinamicheskiy i Gidrodinamicheskiy Institut- central aerodynamics and hydrodynamics institute – may be written CAHI as an acronym of English words

TsAO

Tsentral'naya Aerologicheskaya Observatoriya – central aerologic observatory

TsIAM

Tsentral'nyy Institut Aviatsionnovo Motorostroyeniya - central institute of aviation motors – may be written CIAM as an acronym of English words.

TsKB

Tsentral'noye Konstruktorskoye Byuro - central construction bureau

TsKB 29 NKVD

Tsentral'noye Konstruktorskoye Byuro 29 Narodnyy Komissariat Vnutrennikh Del - NKVD central construction bureau 29

TsKB GUAP

Tsentral'noye Konstruktorskoye Byuro Glahvnoye Oopravleniye Aviatsionnoy Promyshlennosti - central construction bureau main directorate of aviation industry

TsKB MS

TsKB Morskogo Samoletostroyeniya – central seaplane design bureau

TsLST

Tsentral'naya Laboratoriya Spasatel'noy Tekhniki – central laboratory for new types of rescue equipment

TsNIDI

Tsentral'nyy Nauchno-Issledovatel'skiy Dizelniy Institut – [ministry of defence] central scientific research diesel institute

TsNII

Tsentral'nyy Nauchno-Issledovatel'skiy Institut – [ministry of defence] central scientific research institute

TsNIICherMet

Tsentral'nyy Nauchno-Issledovatel'skiy Institut CherMet – central scientific research institute of Ferrous Metals

TsUMVS

Tsentral'noye Upravleniye Mezhdunarodnykh Vozdushnykh Soobshcheniy – central directorate for international services

TMZ

Tushinsky mashinostroitelny Zavod – Tushino engineering works

UGA

Upravleniye Grazhdanskoy Aviatsii – Civil Aviation Directorate

UNIDVS

Ukrainskiy Institut Dvigateley Vnutrennego Sgoraniya – Ukrainian institute of internal combustion engines

UNIADI

Ukrainskiy Nauchno-Issledovatel'skiy Aviadizelniy Institut – Ukrainian scientific research aviation diesel institute

UK

- training centre

UK GVF

U K Grazdanskovo Vozdushnogo Flota - training centre for civil air fleet

Ukrvosdukhput

see UVP

UMKPA

-

UMS

- control board of navy

USR

- special work control

UUZ

Upravleniye Uchebnykh Zavedeniy – Training Establishments Directorate

UVVF

Upravleniye Voyenno-Vozdushnyye Flota – Training Establishment of the Soviet Air force fleet

UVP

Ukrvosdukhput – Ukrainian airline

VAO

Vsesoyuznoye Aviatsionnnoye Ob'yedineniye - all-union aircraft production association

VIAM

Vsesoyuzniy Institut Aviatsionnykh Materialov - all-union institute for aviation materials

VILS

Vsesoyuznyy Institut Legkikh Splavov – All-Union Institute of Light-Alloys

VMO

Vintomotorniy Otdel – propeller and motor department

VNIDI

Vsesoyuznyy Nauchno-Issledovatel'skiy Dizelniy Institut – All-Union Scientific research diesel Institute

VNIImotoprom

Vsesoyuznyy Nauchno-Issledovatel'skiy Institut Motornoy Promishlennosti –All-Union Scientific research institute of the engine industry

VNIIRA

Vsesoyuznyy Nauchno-Issledovatel'skiy Institut Radioelektroniki I Avtomatiki – all-union electronics and automatic equipment research institute

VOKBM

- Voronezh engine design bureau

VPK

1. Voyenno-Promyshlennaya Komissya – commission on military-industrial matters
2. Voyenno-Promyshlennyy Kompleks – defence industry complex

VPK MAPO

Voyenno-Promyshlennyy Kompleks Moskovskoe Aviatsionnoye Proizvodstvennoye Ob"yedineniye – defence industry complex - Moscow aircraft production association defence industry complex

VSNKh

Visshiy Sovet Narodnogo Khozyaystva -supreme council of the people's economy

VT

- internal prison

ZMKB Progress

Zaporozhskoye Motorno-Konstrooktorskoye Byuro ['Progress'] – Preogress Zaporozhskoye engine design bureau

ZOK

Zavod Opytno-konstruktorskoye - factory for special construction / experimental designs (interpretation unclear)

== Military units ==
A-VDV

- airborne forces of VVS

AD

Aviatsionnyy Diviziya - fighter air division

ADD

Aviatsiya Dal'nevo Deystviya - long range aviation

ADON

AviaDiveeziya Osobvo Naznacheniya – special mission air division

AE

Aviaeskadril'ya - air squadron

AIS

Aviatsionnaya Ispytatel'naya Stantsiya, Morskaya Vedomsfva - naval air test station

AMG

A Maksim Gorkii - propaganda squadron

APIB

Aviatsionnyy Polk Istrebiteley Bombardirovshchikov – fighter-bomber regiment

APSZ

Aviatsionnyy Polk Samolyetov-Zaprahvshchikov – aerial refuelling regiment

AT

Aviaotryad - air detachment

AV-MF

Aviatsiya Voyenno-Morskogo Flota - naval aviation

BBAP

Blizhne-bombardirovochnyye Polki - short range bomber air regiment

BAP

Bombardirovchnyy Aviatsionnyy Polk - bomber regiment

DA

Dahl'nyaya Aviahtsiya - long-range aviation became ADD

FA

(Russian:фронтовой авиации) Frontovaya Aviatsiya – frontal aviation tactical aviation of VVS

GvIAP

Gvardeyskiy istrebitel'nyy Aviatsionnyy Polk – Guards fighter regiment

GvOSAP

Gvardeyskiy Otdel'nyy Smeshannyy Aviatsionnyy Polk – guards independent composite air regiment

GvTBAP

Gvardeyskiy Tyazhelobombardirovochnyy Aviatsionnyy Polk – guards heavy bomber regiment

IAS

Inzhenerno-Aviatcionaya Sluzhba - Soviet and Russian Air Force acquisition and maintenance service

IAB

Istrebitel'naya Aviatsionnyy Brigahda - fighter brigade

IAD

Istrebitel'naya Aviatsionnyy Diveeziya - fighter air division

IAP

Istrebitel'nyy Aviatsionnyy Polk - fighter regiment

IA-VPO

Istrebitel'naya Aviahtsiya - Protivovozdushnaya Oborona - manned fighter branch of PVO

LK VVIA

Leningradskaya Krasnoznamennaya Voyenno-Vozdushnaya Inzhenernaya Akademiya – Leningrad red banner military air academy

MA

Morskaya Aviahtsiya - naval aviation became AV-MF

MPVO

Mestnaya Protivovozdushnaya Oborona – local air defence forces

MTAP

Minno-torpednyi Aviatsionnyi Polk – minelaying and torpedo-bomber regiment

NIUTK

Nauchno-Issledovatel'skii i Uchebno-Trenirovchnnyi Kompleks – R&D and training complex ground facility for carrier arresting landings trials and training

OAO

Otdel'nyy Aviatsionnyy Otryad – independent flight detachment

ODRAE

otdel'naya Dahl'nyaya Razvedyvatel'naya Aviaeskadril'ya Independent Long-Range Reconnaissance Squadron

OMAG

- independent naval aviation group

OMTAP

Otdel'nyy Minno-Torpednyy AviaPolk – independent minelaying and torpedo-bomber regiment

OPLAP DD

Otdel'nyy Protivolodochnyy Aviatsionnyy Polk Dahl'nevo Deystviya – independent long-range ASW regiment

OPLAE

Otdel'naya Protivolodochnaya Aviatsionnyy Eskadril'ya – independent ASW squadron Independent ASW Air Squadron

OSAE

Otdel'naya Smeshannaya Aviatsionnyy Eskadril'ya – composite air squadron

OSAP

Otdel'nyy Smeshannyy Aviatsionnyy polk – composite air regiment

PVO

Protivovozdushnaya Oborona – air defence forces

RKKA

Raboche-Krest'yanskaya Krasnaya Armiya – workers and peasants Red Army

ShAD

Shturmovaya Aviatsionnyy Diveeziya – Ground attack air division

ShAK

Shturmovoy Aviatsionnyy Korpoos – Ground attack air corps

ShAP

Shturmovoy Aviatsionnyy Polk – Ground attack air regiment

ShMAS

Shkola Mladshikh Aviatsionnykh Spetsialistov – junior aviation specialists school

SmAD

Smeshannaya Aviatsionnyy Diveeziya – composite air division

SmAP

Smeshannaya Aviatsionnyy Polk – composite air regiment

Stavka

Stavka – Supreme High Command

SGV

Severnaya Gruppa Voysk – Northern Group of Forces

TBAP

Tyazhelobombardirovochnyy Aviapolk – heavy bomber regiment

TDA

Transportno-Desantnaya Aviatsiya – transport and assault aviation

TsBP i PLS

Tsentr Boyevoy Podogotovki i Pereuchivaniya Letnogo Sostava – combat & conversion training centre

TsGV

Tsentrahl'naya Grooppa Voysk – Central forces Group

TVVAUL

Tambovskoye Vyssheye Voyennoye Aviatsionnoye Oochilishche Lyotchikov – Tambov higher military pilot school

UAP

Oochebnyy AviaPolk – instructional regiment

UB

Unifitsirovanny Blok – unified unit

UIAP

Uchebnyy Istrebitel'nyy AviaPolk – instructional fighter regiment

UOSAT

Upravleniye Opytnovo Stroitel'stva Aviatsionnoy Tekhniki – Soviet Ari force experimental aircraft construction department

UVVF

Upravlenie Voyenno-Vozdooshnyye Flota - administration of the military air fleet

UVVS

Upravlenie Voyenno-Vozdooshnyye Seely - administration of the VVS/ air force directorate

VA

Vozdushnaya Armiya – Air Army

VDV

Vozdushno-Desantnyye Voyska – airborne troops

V-MF

Voenno-morskoj flot - Naval Fleet Russian: Военно-морской флот СССР,

V-TA

Voyenno-Transportnaya Aviahtsiya – military transport aviation

VVA

Voynno-Vozdushnaya Akademiya - VVS academy Zhukovskii

VVAUL

Vyesheye Voyennoye Aviatsiionnoye Uchilishche Lyotchikov – military flying college

VVAUSh

Vyesheye Voyennoye Aviatsiionnoye Uchilishche Shturmanov – Military Navigator College

VVF

Voyenno-Vozdushnyye Flota - Air Forces

VVIA

- VVA engineering academy

VVS

Voyenno-Vozdushnyye Sily - Soviet air force

VVS RKKA

Voyenno-Vozdushnyye Sily Raboche-Krest'yanskaya Krasnaya Armiya - Soviet air force of the Workers'and peasants'red army

YuGV

Yuzhnaya Gruppa Voysk – Southern forces Group

ZAP

Zapasnoy Aviatsionnyy/Aviapolk – reserve air/fighter regiment

ZGV

Zapadnaya Gruppa Voysk – Western Group of Forces

ZOK

Zavod Opitnikh Konstruktsiy – factory of experimental designs

== Soviet military academies ==
"ACEC" Moscow Military School

A. Mozhaysky Military Space Academy

A.S. Popov Naval Radioelectronics Institute

Academy of the General Staff

Admiral F.F. Ushakov Baltic Naval Institute

Admiral P.S. Nakhimov Naval School (Leningrad-1944, Tbilisi-1944, and Riga-1945)

Armed Forces Academy of Humanities

Budyonny Military Academy of Communications (Военная академия связи им. С. М. Буденного)

Combined Arms Academy of the Armed Forces of the Russian Federation (Russian: Общевойсковая академия Вооруженных сил Российской Федерации), (ru:Общевойсковая академия Вооружённых Сил Российской Федерации)

Combined Arms Academy

Combined Arms Military Academy of the Armed Forces of the Russian Federation-Military Engineering Forces Institute

Dzerzhinsky Military Academy (Russian: Военная академия им. Ф. Э. Дзержинского)

F. Derzhinskiy Higher Naval Engineering School

Felix Dzerzhinsky Military Rocket Forces Academy

Felix E. Dzerzhinsky Artillery Academy (Артиллерийская академия имени Ф. Э. Дзержинского)

Field Marshal Alexander Suvorov Moscow Military Music School

Fleet Admiral of the Soviet Union N.G. Kuznetsov Naval Academy

Gagarin Air Force Academy In 2008, it has been amalgamated with the Zhukovsky Air Force Engineering Academy. Joint academy was named Zhukovsky – Gagarin Air Force Academy

General of the Army A. V. Khruleva Military Academy of Rear Services and Transportation (Военная академия тыла и транспорта)

General Staff Academy of the Armed Forces of Ukraine

Higher Naval Engineering School

Kronshtadt Naval Cadet Corps

J.V. Stalin Academy

Kalinin Artillery Military Academy

Khabarovsk Military Commanders Training Academy

Kharkiv Military University

Kharkiv National University of the Ukrainian Air Force

Kuybyshev Military Medical Academy

Leningrad Military Academy of Physical Fitness "General Staff of the Armed Forces"

Leningrad Nikolaevsky Military Engineering Technical Institute of the Armed Forces of the USSR

Leninskiy Komsomol Submarine Navigation High Naval School

M. V. Frunze High Naval School ;M. V. Frunze Military Academy

Malinovsky Academy

Marshal Alexander Vasilevsky Military Academy of the Army Air Defense Corps (Военная академия войсковой противовоздушной обороны им. А. М. Василевского)

Marshal Rodion Malinovsky Military Armoured Forces Academy (Военная академия бронетанковых войск им. Р. Я. Малиновского)

Marshal A.A. Grechko Naval Academy

Marshal Georgy Zhukov Command Academy of the Air Defense Forces

Marshal of the Soviet Union L.A. Govorov Air Defense Radio Engineering Academy (Russian: Военная инженерная радиотехническая академия им. Маршала Советского Союза Говорова Л.А.)

Marshal Semyon Budyonny Military Signals and Communications Academy

Marshal Semyon Timoshenko Military Academy of Chemical Defense and Control (Военная академия химической защиты им. С. К. Тимошенко)

Mikhail Kalinin Military Artillery Academy

Kalinin Artillery Military Academy (Военная артиллерийская академия им. М. И. Калинина)

Mikhailovskaya Artillery Academy (Михайловская артиллерийская академия)

Mikhailovskaya Artillery Military Academy (Russian: Михайловская военная артиллерийская академия)

Military Artillery Academy "Grand Duke Mikhail Pavlovich"

Military Air Combat Training Centers

Russian: ЦБПиПЛС - Центры боевого применения и переучивания личного состава // Tsentry boyevogo primenyeniya i pereuchivaniya lichnogo sostava

Center of Frontline Aviation, Lipetsk Air Base
Center of Air Defense Aviation, Savasleika Саваслейка Archived 2012-01-20 at the Wayback Machine)
Center of Naval Aviation of the Russian Navy, Ostrov (air base), near Pskov
Center of Long Range Aviation, Dyagilevo

Military Educational and Scientific Center (Russ. ВУНЦ) Note
Military Educational and Scientific Center (MESC) is a type of the institution, not a single military entity. E.g. " Russian Air Force MESC Zhukovsky – Gagarin Air Force Academy". About 10 MESCs were established 2000s.

Military Engineering University of St. Petersburg

Military Engineering-Technical University (Russian: Военный инженерно-технический университет)

Military Institute of Foreign Languages now part of the Military University of the Ministry of Defense of Russian Federation

Military Technical Academy

Military University of the Ministry of Defense of Russian Federation (Военный университет Министерства обороны Российской Федерации)

Ministry of Defence Institute

Ministry of Emergency Situations Civil Defence Academy

Ministry of the Interior of Russia High Command Academy

Moscow Felix Dzerzhinsky Federal Security Service Academy

Moscow High Command Training School "Supreme Soviet of the Russian Socialist Federative Soviet Republic"

Moscow Military Commanders Training School

Moscow Military Institute of the Russian FSS

Moscow Military School of Infantry Training

Moscow Military School

MVD Central School

Naval Engineering Institute

Nikolaevsky Military Engineering-Technical Institute of the Armed Forces

Nikolai Zhukovsky Air Force Engineering Academy (Военно-воздушная инженерная академия имени профессора Н. Е. Жуковского)

Peter the Great Military Academy of the Strategic Missile Force * Peter the Great Military Academy of the Strategic Missile Force (official Web Site) (in Russian)

Peter the Great Naval Corps - St. Petersburg Naval Institute

Red Army Military Technical Academy

RKKA Military Academy

S.O. Makarov Pacific Naval Institute

School of Mathematics and Navigational Sciences

Sergei Kirov Military Medical Academy

St. Peterburg Military Engineering-Technical University

St. Petersburg Military Academy of Physical Fitness Culture and Sports

St. Petersburg Military Institute of Civil Defence of the Ministry of Emergency Situations

St. Petersburg MVD Internal Troops Military Institute

St. Petersburg University of the Ministry of Internal Affairs of Russia Fleet Admiral Of the Soviet Union N.G. Kuznetsov Naval Academy

V.I. Lenin Political-Military Academy Russian: Военно-политическая академия имени В. И. Ленина

Valerian Kuybyshev Military Engineering Academy

Volsk Military Rear Services Training School

WPRA 1st Soviet High Military School "All-Russian Central Executive Committee''

WPRA Academy of Mechanized and Motorized Service

Yekaterinburg Force Command School of Artillery

Yuri Gagarin Military Air Academy

Zhukovsky Air Force Engineering Academy In 2008, it has been amalgamated with the Gagarin Air Force Academy. Joint academy was named Zhukovsky – Gagarin Air Force Academy

Zhukovsky – Gagarin Air Force Academy

Kirov Military Medical Academy (Russian: Военно-медицинская академия им. С. М. Кирова)

== Bibliography ==
- Gordon, Yefim. Early Soviet Jet Bombers. Hinkley, Midland. 2004. ISBN 1-85780-181-4
- Gordon, Yefim. Early Soviet Jet Fighters. Hinkley, Midland. 2002. ISBN 1-85780-139-3
- Gordon, Yefim. Sukhoi Interceptors. Hinkley, Midland. 2004. ISBN 1-85780-180-6
- Gordon, Yefim. Soviet Rocket Fighters. Hinkley, Midland. 2006. ISBN 1-85780-245-4 / ISBN 978-1-85780-245-0
- Gordon, Yefim. Soviet Heavy Interceptors. Hinkley, Midland. 2004. ISBN 1-85780-191-1
- Gordon, Yefim. Lavochkin's Last Jets. Hinkley, Midland. 2004. ISBN 1-85780-253-5 / ISBN 978-1-85780-253-5
- Gordon, Yefim & Komissarov, Dmitry & Komissarov, Sergey. OKB Ilyushin. Hinkley, Midland. 2004. ISBN 1-85780-187-3
- Gunston, Bill. The Osprey Encyclopaedia of Russian Aircraft 1875–1995. London, Osprey. 1995. ISBN 1-85532-405-9
- Antonov, Vladimir & Gordon, Yefim & others. OKB Sukhoi. Leicester. Midland. 1996. ISBN 1-85780-012-5
- Gordon, Yefim & Komissarov, Dmitry & Sergey. OKB Yakovlev. Hinkley. Midland. 2005. ISBN 1-85780-203-9
- Gordon, Yefim & Komissarov, Dmitry. OKB Mikoyan. Hinkley, Midland. 2009. ISBN 978-1-85780-307-5
- Gordon, Yefim & Komissarov, Dmitry & Sergey. OKB Ilyushin. Hinkley. Midland. 2004. ISBN 1-85780-187-3
- Gordon, Yefim & Rigmant, Vladimir. Tupolev Tu-144. Midland. Hinkley. 2005. ISBN 1-85780-216-0 ISBN 978 185780 216 0
- Gordon, Yefim & Komissarov, Dmitry. Antonov An-12. Midland. Hinkley. 2007. ISBN 1-85780-255-1 ISBN 978 1 85780 255 9
- Gordon, Yefim & Komissarov, Dmitry & Komissarov, Sergey. Mil's Heavylift Helicopters. Hinkley, Midland. 2005. ISBN 1-85780-206-3
- Gordon, Yefim. Tupolev Tu-160 "Blackjack". Hinkley, Midland. 2003. ISBN 1-85780-147-4
- Gordon, Yefim & Komissarov, Dmitry. Antonov's Jet Twins. Hinkley, Midland. 2005. ISBN 1-85780-199-7
- Gordon, Yefim & Komissarov, Dmitry. Kamov Ka-27/-32 Family. Hinkley, Midland. 2006. ISBN 1-85780-237-3 ISBN 978 1 85780 237 5
- Gordon, Yefim & Komissarov, Dmitry. Antonov An-2. Midland. Hinkley. 2004. ISBN 1-85780-162-8
- Gordon, Yefim & Rigmant, Vladimir. Tupolev Tu-114. Midland. Hinkley. 2007. ISBN 1-85780-246-2 ISBN 978 1 85780 246 7
- Gordon, Yefim & Komissarov, Dmitry. Ilyushin Il-12 and Il-14. Midland. Hinkley. 2005. ISBN 1-85780-223-3 ISBN 978 1 85780 223 8
- Gordon, Yefim. Yakovlev Yak-36, Yak-38 & Yak-41. Midland. Hinkley. 2008. ISBN 978-1-85780-287-0
- Gordon, Yefim & Komissarov, Dmitry & Sergey. Antonov's Turboprop Twins. Hinkley. Midland. 2003. ISBN 1-85780-153-9
- Gordon, Yefim. Myasischev M-4 and 3M. Hinkley. Midland. 2003. ISBN 1-85780-152-0
- Gordon, Yefim & Rigmant, Vladimir. Tupolev Tu-104. Midland. Hinkley. 2007. ISBN 978-1-85780-265-8
- Gordon, Yefim & Komissarov, Dmitry. Mil Mi-8/Mi-17. Hinkley. Midland. 2003. ISBN 1-85780-161-X
- Gordon, Yefim & Dexter, Kieth Polikarpov's I-16 Fighter. Hinkley. Midland. 2001. ISBN 1-85780-131-8
- Gordon, Yefim. Mikoyan MiG-25 "Foxbat". Hinkley. Midland. 2007. ISBN 1-85780-259-4 ISBN 978 1 85780 259 7
- Gordon, Yefim & Dexter, Kieth Mikoyan's Piston-Engined Fighters. Hinkley. Midland. 2003. ISBN 1-85780-160-1
- Gordon, Yefim & Rigmant, Vladimir. Tupolev Tu-4. Midland. Hinkley. 2002. ISBN 1-85780-142-3
- Gordon, Yefim. Sukhoi S-37 and Mikoyan MFI. Midland. Hinkley. 2001 reprinted 2006. ISBN 1-85780-120-2 ISBN 978 1 85780 120 0
- Gordon, Yefim & Khazanov, Dmitry. Yakovlev's Piston-Engined Fighters. Hinkley. Midland. 2002. ISBN 1-85780-140-7
- Gordon, Yefim & Sal'nikov, Andrey. Zablotsky, Aleksandr. Beriev's Jet Flying Boats. Hinkley. Midland. 2006. ISBN 1-85780-236-5 ISBN 978 1 85780 236 8
- Gordon, Yefim. & Dexter, Keith. Polikarpov's Biplane Fighters. Hinkley. Midland Publishing. 2002. ISBN 1-85780-141-5
- Gordon, Yefim. Soviet/Russian Aircraft Weapons. Midland. 2004. ISBN 1-85780-188-1
- Koletnikov, Vladimir. Russian Piston Aero Engines. Marlborough. The Crowood Press. 2005. ISBN 1-86126-702-9
