= Vladimir Balagurov =

Vladimir Balagurov Владимир Балагуров
- Born: Vladimir Aleksandrovich Balagurov; Владимир Александрович Балагуров
- Died: 1985; Moscow, USSR
- Education: Moscow Power Engineering Institute
- Scientific career
- Fields: Automotive industry

Vladimir Aleksandrovich Balagurov (Russian: Владимир Александрович Балагуров) was a Soviet and Russian scientist in the field of Electromechanics, professor.

== Biography ==
In 1937 he entered the Moscow Power Engineering Institute. After graduation he stayed to study and work at the institute.

The direction of his Ph.D. and D.Sc. theses related to the theory and practice of high-voltage ignition devices. The results of these works are contained in the monograph "Apparatus ignition." His activities and the work carried out by his students are related to the theory and practice of using magnetoelectric machines.

In 1959, Vladimir Balagurov was awarded the academic title of professor. Among his students there are hundreds of engineers and dozens of candidates of science. The books he wrote are used by graduates of higher educational institutions. Vladimir Aleksandrovich Balagurov for more than 20 years was the head of the problem laboratory of permanent magnets in MPEI.

The creation in the problem laboratory of permanent magnets of the scientific school of gate electromechanics is connected with his work at the Moscow Power Engineering Institute.

He died after a serious illness in 1985.

== Literature ==
- Electric generators with permanent magnets / VA Balagurov, FF Galteev. - M.: Energoatomizdat, 1988. - 279, [1] p. : yl; 21 cm; ISBN 5-283-00556-9
