= Alexei Bogomolov =

Russian radio engineer

- Born: Alexei Fyodorovich Bogomolov; 2 June 1913; Sitskoye village, Smolensk Governorate, Russian Empire
- Died: 12 April 2009 (aged 95); Moscow, Russian Federation
- Occupation: Specialist in the field of radio engineering

Alexei Fyodorovich Bogomolov (Russian: Алексей Фёдорович Богомолов; 2 June 1913, Voronezh – 12 April 2009, Moscow) was a Soviet and Russian scientist and a specialist in the field of radio engineering.

== Biography ==
Alexei Fyodorovich Bogomolov was born on 2 June 1913 in the village of Sitskoye, Smolensk Governorate. From 1923 he lived in Moscow. In 1927 he graduated from a secondary school, and in 1929 he graduated from the 1st Moscow Institute of Labor Education. During 1929–1932 he worked in "Stroyelektro" as electrician, brigadier and senior electrician. In 1937 he graduated from Moscow Power Engineering Institute (MPEI) and began working on his doctoral thesis on the topic of power line lightning protection, but his research was interrupted with the beginning of Great Patriotic War (World War II).

Bogomolov was sent to three-month special courses at the Leningrad Military Electrotechnical Academy of Telecommunications. After graduation, he was first appointed platoon commander, then served as an engineer for the radar of anti-aircraft artillery units of the Leningrad Front. For his courage he was awarded the Order of the Red Star.

At the end of 1945, Alexei Fedorovich was recalled from the army to work for the Moscow Power Engineering Institute (MPEI) at the Department of Radio Engineering Devices. He also taught at the Higher Engineering Courses of Bauman Moscow State Technical University during 1947–1954. In 1949 he defended his thesis on the theory of blocking generators. In 1955 he was appointed Head of the Department of Radio Engineering Devices in MPEI.

Bogomolov was the Chief Designer (Director) of MPEI Special Design Bureau from 1954 to 1989. He also was a member of Sergei Korolev's Council of Chief Designers. He did research in the fields of radiotelemetry, trajectory measurements, phase direction finding and antenna systems. He took part in testing of R-16 in 1960 at Baikonur and survived Nedelin catastrophe.

Alexei Fyodorovich Bogomolov died on 12 April 2009 in Moscow and was buried at Troyekurovskoye Cemetery.

He was a Hero of Socialist Labour (1957) and Lenin Prize (1966) and USSR State Prize (1978, 1986) winner.
