= Ottó Benedikt =

Hungarian scientist

- Born: May 18, 1897; Budapest
- Died: November 25, 1975; Budapest
- Education: Vienna University of Technology
- Scientific career
- Fields: Electrical engineering

Ottó Benedikt (18 May 1897 - 25 November 1975) was a Hungarian scientist in the field of Electrical engineering, professor, and member of the Hungarian Academy of Sciences.

== Biography ==
He was born in 1897 in Budapest. After graduation at 18, he fought on the fronts of the First World War.

In December 1918 he joined the Communist Party of Hungary. After the proclamation of the Hungarian Soviet Republic in 1919, he worked together with a member of the Central Committee of the Party, Bela Kun. After the death of the Soviet Republic and the Romanian occupation, he was imprisoned and interned. When he was in Austria in 1920, he organized the labor movement, and was responsible for maintaining relations between the Austrian and Hungarian Communist parties. He studied at the Technical University of Vienna.

He was active in party activities, he also worked at the Technical University of Vienna, in 1930 and received a doctorate in electrical engineering. In 1932 he emigrated to the Soviet Union. In 1938, after Austria was included in Germany, he was deprived of Austrian citizenship, but received Soviet citizenship at the same time. Since 1939 he worked at the Moscow Power Engineering Institute as a professor. He worked at the Moscow Power Engineering Institute until 1955.

In 1955 he returned home to Hungary. At home, he got a job at the Budapest Polytechnic University, he organized a department of electric machine there. In 1956 he was elected to the Hungarian Academy of Sciences.

== Literature ==
- Die neue elektrische Maschine „Autodyne”. Budapest: Akadémiai. 1957.
- Nagytelítésű bonyolult mágneses körök új számítási módszere. Budapest: Akadémiai. 1958.
- Németül: Die nomographische Methode der Berechnung komplizierter und stark gesättigter magnetischer Kreise elektrischer-Maschinen. Budapest: Akadémiai. 1960.
- Különleges villamosgépek I–II. Budapest: Budapesti Műszaki Egyetem. 1959.
- The autodyne: A new electrical machine. New York: Pergamon Press. 1960.
- Beiträge zur Weiterentwicklung der Theorie der Gleichstrommaschine I–II. Budapest: Akadémiai. 1975.
- Befejezetlen emlékiratok. Budapest: Benedikt Szvetlána. 2007.
