= Nikolai Vladimirovich Astakhov =

Soviet and Russian scientist

Nikolai Vladimirovich Astakhov Николай Владимирович Астахов
- Born: November 15, 1921; Tula Oblast
- Died: November 4, 2001 (aged 79); Moscow
- Education: Moscow Power Engineering Institute
- Scientific career
- Fields: Acoustical engineering

Nikolai Vladimirovich Astakhov (Russian: Николай Владимирович Астахов; 15 November 1921 – 4 November 2001) was a Soviet and Russian scientist in the field of Acoustical engineering and a professor.

== Biography ==
He was born in 1921 in the Tula Oblast.

In 1939 he entered the Moscow Power Engineering Institute and began his studies at the electromechanical faculty, specializing in Electrical Machines.

He interrupted his studies due to the World War II. From June 1941 to May 1945, he fought in aviation in the Western, 3rd Baltic and Stalingrad fronts. He was awarded military orders of the Red Star, the Patriotic War of the 1st degree, medals "For Military Merit","For Victory over Germany", "For the Defense of Stalingrad", "For the Defense of Moscow".

After the war he continued his studies at the Moscow Power Engineering Institute, which he graduated in 1952 and where ha started his work as a teacher.

He carried out research work related to the reduction of noise and vibration for the submarines of the Soviet Navy, he created the first "drowned out" camera, through which the vibro-acoustic tests of electrical machines were conducted.

He studied the problems of vibration and noise that arose in electric machines under the influence of an electromagnetic field. The result of the research was the development of a methodology for the design of machines of different types, which would have a different set level of vibration and noise.

He was engaged in teaching and social activities.

== Literature ==
- МЭИ:история, люди, годы:сборник воспоминаний. В 3 томах. Под общей редакцией С.В.Серебрянникова. Том I // — Москва: Издательский дом МЭИ, 2010. — 544 с. — ISBN 978-5-383-00575-0.
