= Shadrinsky =

Shadrinsky (masculine), Shadrinskaya (feminine), or Shadrinskoye (neuter) may refer to:

- Shadrinsky District, a district of Kurgan Oblast, Russia
- Shadrinsky (rural locality), a rural locality (a settlement) in Kurgan Oblast, Russia
- Shadrinskaya, a rural locality (a village) in Kirov Oblast, Russia
