= Chelyabinsk Shagol Airport =

Military airfield in Chelyabinsk, Russia

Chelyabinsk Shagol
- Челябинск Шагол
- Chelyabinsk, Chelyabinsk Oblast in Russia
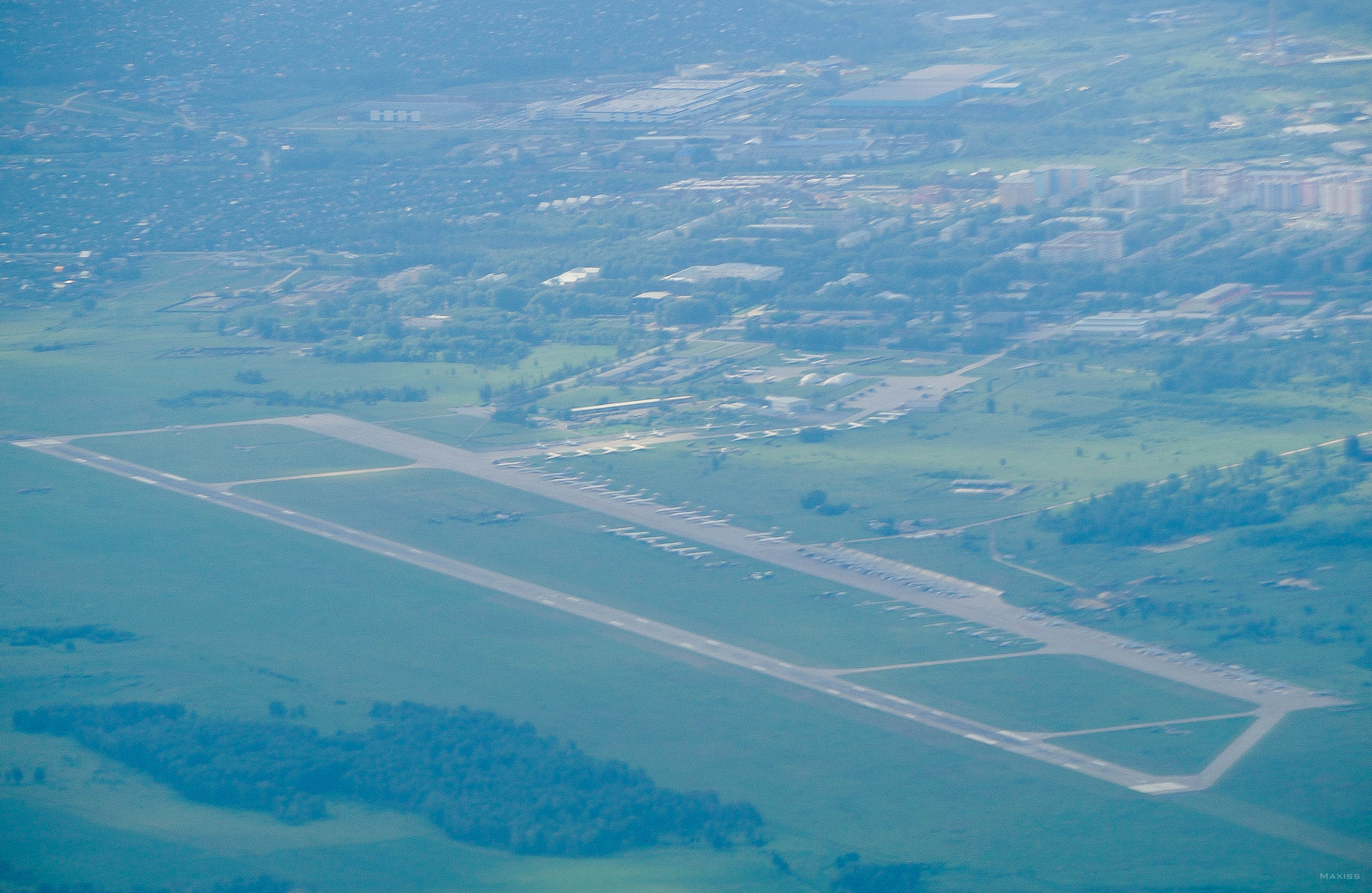

Site information
- Type: Air Base
- Owner: Ministry of Defence
- Operator: Russian Aerospace Forces
- Controlled by: Chelyabinsk Red Banner Military Aviation Institute of Navigators

Location
- Shown within Chelyabinsk Oblast Chelyabinsk Shagol (Russia)
- Coordinates: 55°15′36″N 61°18′0″E

Site history
- In use: -present

Airfield information
- Elevation: 253 metres (830 ft) AMSL
Runways
Direction	Length and surface
12/30	2,500 metres (8,202 ft) Concrete

Chelyabinsk Shagol (Russian: Челябинск Шагол) is a military airfield of the Russian Aerospace Forces in Chelyabinsk, Chelyabinsk Oblast, Russia.

The base is home to the 108th Training Aviation Regiment which flies the Antonov An-26, Antonov An-72, Mil Mi-8 under the Prof. N.E. Zhukovsky and Iu.A. Gagarin Air Force Academy and the 2nd Guards Composite Aviation Regiment which flies the Sukhoi Su-24MR and the Sukhoi Su-34 under the 21st Composite Aviation Division.

== History ==
Chelyabinsk Shagol Airport was opened in 1938 as the first airport in Chelyabinsk, named after the adjacent village of Shagol which has since been absorbed by the city, and can park over 40 aircraft. The airfield operated passenger flight services and was the primary airport for Chelyabinsk until 1953, when all passenger traffic was redirected to Chelyabinsk Balandino Airport.

It was re-purposed to military use, housing aircraft of the Soviet Air Force and the local pilot training school, the Chelyabinsk Red Banner Military Aviation Institute of Navigators. OJSC "712 Aviation Repair Plant" was founded in 1954, and has an aircraft parking area of 4 hectares connected by taxiways to the airport runway. During the Cold War, it was a military bomber training base, and had about 35 Tupolev Tu-134 UBLs based as recently as 1995. Kommersant-Vlast indicated in 2005 that the 239 Separate Mixed Aviation Regiment was based here. In August 2007, Shagol was used in military exercises of Shanghai Cooperation Organisation. It is also used for air shows. From 2010, it also serves as the base for the 6980th Guards Aviation Base (Military Unit Number 69806) equipped with Su-24M bombers and Su-24MR reconnaissance aircraft.

In 2015, one of the Su-24's based at Shagol was shot down in Syria after reportedly violating Turkish airspace, worsening the relations between Turkey and Russia.

On 3 January 2024, a Su-34 bomber was set on fire at the Chelyabinsk Shagol Airport by a Ukrainian saboteur according to the Ukrainian GUR.

== Noise complaints ==
Shagol is located in the north-western outskirts Chelyabinsk, but the aircraft landing at the runway have to fly over multiple dense suburban residential districts. This has caused noise concerns from local residents, who filed complaints that low-flying aircraft would wake them up at night and trigger car alarms. A court order in 2013 suspended the flights of Su-24 aircraft, however, the ruling was overturned in the Supreme Court of Russia, but required the aircraft operated from the airport to increase their glideslope angle by 1.5 degrees. Some of the Su-24 aircraft based in Shagol were relocated to Syria in 2015 but returned in March 2016.

== See also ==
- List of military airbases in Russia
