= Chelyabinsk Red Banner Military Aviation Institute of Navigators =

Chelyabinsk Higher Military Aviation School for Navigators
- One of the Tu-134UBLs used by the school
- Active: October 1, 1936 -
- Country: Soviet Union; Russia
- Branch: Soviet Air Forces; Russian Air Force
- Garrison/HQ: Chelyabinsk Shagol Airport
- Equipment: Lisunov Li-2, Tupolev Tu-134
- Decorations: Order of the Red Banner

The Chelyabinsk Military Aviation Institute of Navigators is a Russian Aerospace Forces school, located in Chelyabinsk Shagol Airport. The previous name's translation was the Chelyabinsk Higher Military Aviation Red Banner Navigation School named after the 50th anniversary of the Komsomol (CHVVAKUSH) (Russian: Челябинское высшее военное авиационное краснознамённое училище штурманов им 50-летия ВЛКСМ, ЧВВАКУШ).

== History ==
The Chelyabinsk Higher Military Aviation School for Navigators was created on 1 October 1936, in accordance with the General Staff of the Red Army Directive № 4/3/34338 from 13 February 1936. It received the name "The 15th Military School of Aircraft Observers" of the normal type with a training period of three years. The military unit number allotted was 3858.

Order NKO USSR № 067 from 13 May 1938 and the 15th Military School Pilot observers was renamed the Chelyabinsk Military School of Pilot Observers (CHVVULN).

The first issue of pilots from the school was in October 1939. That year the school dispatched 217 people, most of which were sent to the Leningrad and the Far Eastern Military Districts.

On 1 January 1941, in accordance with a General Staff Directive of the 16 January 1940, CHVVULN was renamed the Chelyabinsk Military Aviation School of Fast Bombardiers.

On 15 May 1941, the school absorbed the Krasnodar School of Rifle Fast Bombardiers, and on September 15 the same year - Pavlograd Aviation School of Rifle Fast Bombardiers.

On 25 April 1943 renamed Chelyabinsk Military Aviation School of Navigators and Rifle Bombardiers of Long-Range Aviation.

On 10 August 1944 renamed Chelyabinsk Military Aviation School of Navigators and Rifle Radio Operators of Long-Range Aviation.

On 6 November 1944, the school was awarded the Red Banner.

During World War II the school graduated 25 groups of navigators, gunners, 18 groups wireless operators, trained about 8000 aviation professionals, and created and sent to the front five air regiments and an air squadron. 27 graduates of the school were awarded the title of Hero of the Soviet Union. Fifteen pilots from the five regiments formed in the early years of the war on the basis of the school were also awarded the title Hero of the Soviet Union, and more than two thousand graduates were awarded military medals and decorations. In June 1945, after the war, the college was transferred to a new period of training.

In November 1947, the school was renamed the Chelyabinsk Military Aviation School of Navigators and Communication Specialists of Long-Range Aviation. In 1954, the school was subordinated to the Air Forces of the Volga-Urals Military District. In December 1954, renamed Chelyabinsk Military Aviation School of Navigators. On 15 May 1959 renamed Chelyabinsk Higher Military Aviation School of Navigators.

Organisation 1960:

- 604th Training Aviation Regiment (Chelyabinsk Shagol Airport, Chelyabinsk Oblast) with Li-2
- 605th Training Aviation Regiment (Kamensk-Uralskiy, Sverdlovsk Oblast) with Li-2

Organisation 1990:

- 108th Training Aviation Regiment (Shadrinsk, Kurgan Oblast) with Tu-134Sh
- 604th Training Aviation Regiment (Shagol, Chelyabinsk Oblast) with An-26Sh and Tu-134Sh
- 605th Training Aviation Regiment (Kamensk-Uralskiy, Sverdlovsk Oblast) with Tu-134Sh
- 607th Training Aviation Regiment (Yuzhno-Uralskiy (Uprun), Chelyabinsk Oblast) with Tu-134Sh

Since October 1996 the Cadet Boarding School with initial flight training was opened.

In June 2002 it was renamed to Chelyabinsk Military Aviation Institute of Navigators.

In 2008, the School was affiliated with the Zhukovsky – Gagarin Air Force Academy as a separate organizational unit and later became a subsidiary of the Zhukovsky – Gagarin Air Force Academy.

Order of the Russian Minister of Defence on July 12, 2011 N 1136 liquidated subsidiaries of the academy in the cities of Yeysk (Krasnodar Krai), Saint Petersburg and Chelyabinsk.
