= Alexander Feldbaum =

Soviet scientist

Alexander Aronovich Feldbaum
- Born: August 16, 1913; Yekaterinoslav, Russian Empire
- Died: January 15, 1969 (aged 55); Moscow, USSR
- Education: MPEI
- Scientific career
- Fields: automatic control
- Doctoral advisor: A. A. Andronov

Alexander Aronovich Feldbaum (1913 — 1969) was a Soviet scientist in the field of automatic control and fundamental computer science. He is one of the founders of optimal control, and proposed dual control theory in the study of self-adjusting and self-learning systems.

== Biography ==
He was born on August 16, 1913, in Yekaterinoslav (now Dnipro, Ukraine).

In 1924, he entered directly into the fifth grade of middle school. In 1937, he graduated from the Moscow Power Engineering Institute, and in 1941, the correspondence department of the MSU Faculty of Mechanics and Mathematics.

Since 1936, A. A. Feldbaum has been an employee of the All-Russian Electrotechnical Institute (Всероссийский электротехнический институт). In 1939, he published his first scientific paper dedicated to the theory of automatic control. In 1943, he defended his PhD thesis on the theory of controlling devices.

Since 1945, A. A. Feldbaum taught at the Peter the Great Military Academy of the Strategic Missile Forces, a professor of the department of missile control systems of the faculty of reactive armament. He was engaged in the development of the theory of linear control systems, as well as the development and creation of the first analog computers in the USSR. From 1945 to 1964, he lectured there on electrical engineering, radio engineering, electrical measurements, automatics, theory of automatic regulation, theoretical foundations of communication and control.

In 1948, A. A. Feldbaum formulated the mathematical statement of the optimal control problem as a variational problem and provided its solution for a number of important applied tasks.

In 1949, A. A. Feldbaum constructed and theoretically investigated non-linear (quadratic in velocity) feedback, proving that it provides the maximum rate of action in the tracking motor controller system.

In 1953, A. A. Feldbaum defended his doctoral dissertation on the dynamics of automatic regulation systems. A. A. Feldbaum introduced the concept of the degree of oscillation of transitional processes, proved a number of theorems about the forms of transient processes and their relationship with the distribution of the roots of the characteristic equation, developed criteria for quadratic errors.

In 1953, A. A. Feldbaum proved a theorem about n-intervals. Sometime later, this result became a starting point in the development of the open maximum principle by L. S. Pontryagin.

In 1955, at several seminars at the RAS V. A. Steklov Mathematical Institute, A. A. Feldbaum extensively discussed his findings. He explained and posed the general problem of optimal control to a group of outstanding mathematicians led by Academician L. S. Pontryagin.

A. A. Feldbaum considered the general problem of synthesizing optimal systems, introducing the fundamental concept of a switching surface in phase space (1955). Sometime later, Sun Zhen, a graduate student of A. A. Feldbaum from China, simulated this switching surface on a computer. Subsequently, this model was used in a high-speed tracking device designed for firing.

In the late 1950s, he contributed to the development of dual control theory. He proposed ways to solve synthesis problems of optimal control for systems with incomplete information.

From 1961, he was the head of the laboratory of self-tuning systems at the Institute of Automation and Telemechanics of the USSR Academy of Sciences. At the Institute of Automation and Telemechanics of the USSR Academy of Sciences, he established a laboratory for search and self-tuning systems, where the world's first multichannel search systems (optimizers) were implemented.

He laid the theoretical foundations and formulated the defining ideas of dual control theory, which combines learning and control.

He died on January 15, 1969. His cremated remains are buried in Moscow at the Donskoy Cemetery (plot No. 3).
