= Germogen Pospelov =

Soviet and Russian scientist (1914–1998)

- Born: May 25, 1914; Orekhovo-Zuyevo
- Died: November 24, 1998 (aged 84); Moscow
- Awards: Medal "For Battle Merit"

Germogen Sergeevich Pospelov (Russian: Гермоген Сергеевич Поспелов; 1914, in Orekhovo-Zuyevo – 1998, in Moscow) was a Soviet and Russian scientist, Doctor of Sciences in Technical Sciences (1956), Academician of the Russian Academy of Sciences (since 1984), major general. Laureate of the 1972 USSR State Prize.

== Life ==
He graduated with honors from the Moscow Power Engineering Institute in 1940. From 1941 to 1946 he was an engineer of an Aviation regiment. From 1946 to 1964 he taught at the Zhukovsky Air Force Engineering Academy, and earned his Candidat degree in 1949, and in 1957 he received the title of professor. Starting in 1969, he headed the Department at the MFTI. Starting in 1974, he was a head of laboratory of the Dorodnitsyn Computing Centre.

He was elected a corresponding member of the Academy of Sciences of the USSR in 1966.
