= Nikolay Rogalev =

Nikolay Dmitrievich Rogalev
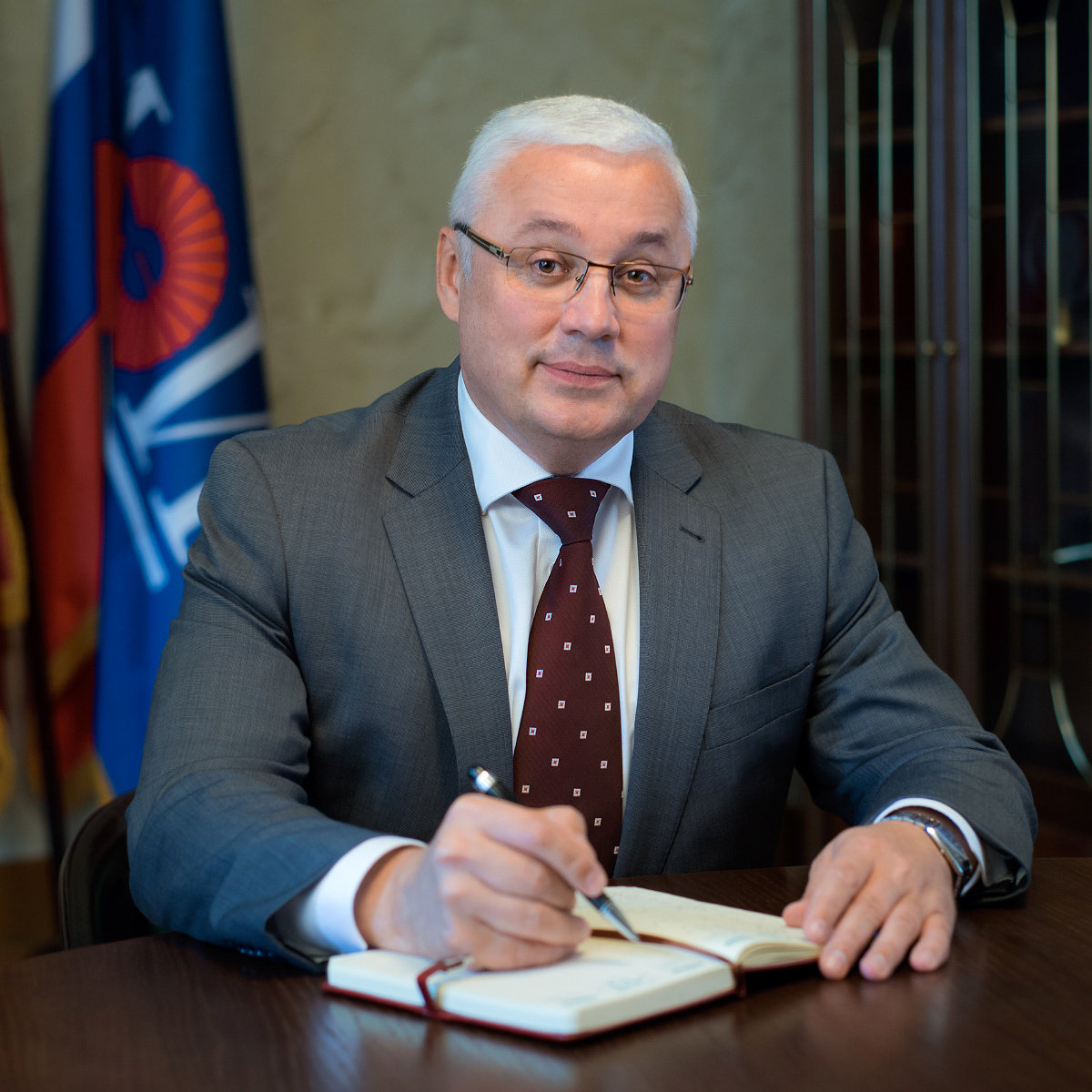
- Born: Nikolay Dmirtievich Rogalev; Николай Дмитриевич Рогалёв; 17 February 1962 (age 64); Urusu village, Tatar ASSR, USSR
- Occupations: Energetics researcher, Rector of Moscow Power Engineering Institute (MPEI)

Nikolay Dmirtievich Rogalev (Russian: Николай Дмитриевич Рогалёв; born 17 February 1962, Urusu village, Tatar ASSR, USSR) is a Russian scientist and energetics researcher. Rector of Moscow Power Engineering Institute (MPEI) since 2013.

== Biography ==
Nikolay Dmirtievich Rogalev was born on 17 February 1962 in Urusu village, Tatar ASSR. In 1985 he graduated from Heat and Power Faculty of Moscow Power Engineering Institute. In 1988 he defended his candidate thesis, and in 1998 - his doctoral thesis on the topic "Ecological technologies in heat power engineering". He then trained (as lead researcher) at Institute of Innovation, Creativity and Capital of the University of Texas at Austin in 1996 and was as a visiting scholar in the University of Texas in Austin in 1994 and 1997.

Rogalev's scientific interests include scientific, technological and economic problems of fuel and energy complex, technological transfer and commercialization of technologies, problems of university education.

In 2001, Nikolay Rogalev was appointed Head of the Department of Economics of Industry and Organization of MPEI (now it is named the Department of Economics in Energy and Industry). Under his leadership, the Department expanded its research in the fields of economics and management of fuel and energy complex, as well as in commercialization of technology and in development of innovative activities in Russian universities.

From 2003 to 2007, he also worked as a Deputy Rector of MPEI for innovation activity.

On 13 March 2013 he was appointed acting Rector of MPEI and on 27 June 2013 he was elected Rector at an Intstitute conference, where he got 87% of votes. Under his leadership in 2014 MPEI was included into the list of 100 best universities of BRICS state-members.
