= King Steve Benjamin =

- Born: Steve Benjamin; 20 October 1993 (age 32); Ekiti State
- Occupations: Singer; songwriter; record producer

Steve Benjamin (born October 20, 1993), better known by his stage name King Steve Benjamin (KSB), is a Russian-based Nigerian singer. He is a Recipient of Nigeria Entertainment Awards and also Nigerian Books of Record. KSB first gained recognition in 2017 when he sang "Konto". In 2023, He performed at the 100 years anniversary of CSKA club.

== Early life ==
KSB was born into the family of 4 who are Christians. He hails from Ado Ekiti a town situated in the northern part of Ekiti State, western Nigeria. He was trained as a Computer engineer at Moscow Power Engineering Institute in the city of Moscow, Russia. Having completed his training in 2017, he joined the music industry.

== Career ==
KSB started singing at the age of seven and by the time he was ten, he joined his church choir. He officially started his music career in July 2017 with his debut album ".Ado 2 Moscow”. The album consisted of "Konto, Ifeoma, Tinini Tanana, Make Am" and other tracks. His first single on the album "Konto". Was a hit and there he was named King of Afrobeats in Russia.

At the End of 2020, he started his own record company, "KSB Vibes", to release his music. KSB performed at the 2015 OPEC - Russia Energy Discussion hosted by the Nigerian Government in Moscow, Russia, the Russian HipHop international dance festival 2020, BRICS Summit, 2023 Russia–Africa Summit.
