= Shadrinsk =

Town in Kurgan Oblast, Russia

Shadrinsk Шадринск
- Town
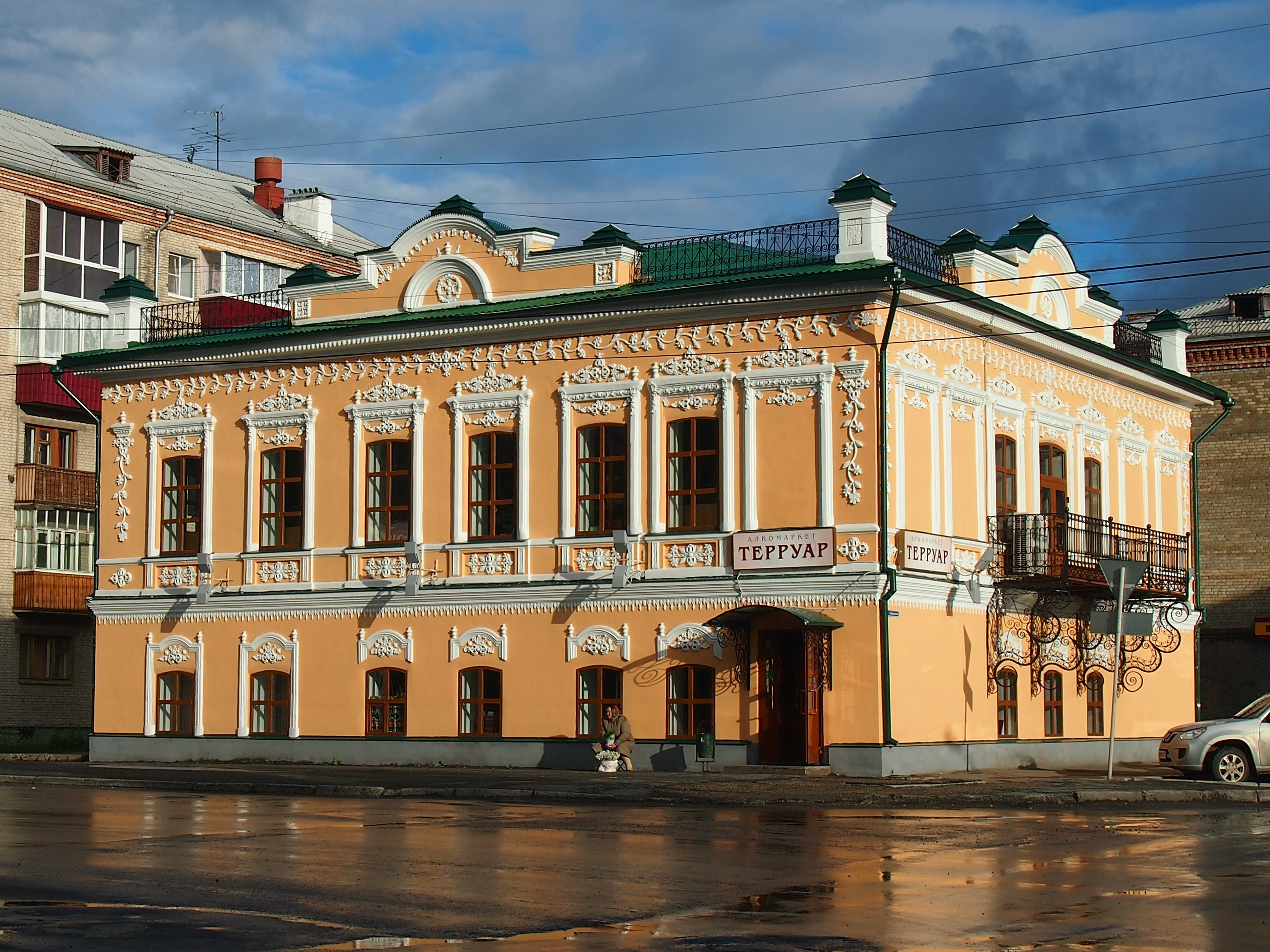

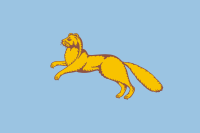
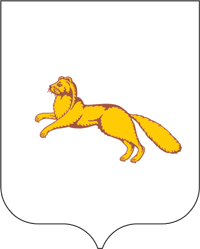
- Flag Coat of arms
- Interactive map of Shadrinsk
- Location of Shadrinsk Shadrinsk (Kurgan Oblast)
- Coordinates: 56°08′N 63°39′E
- Country: Russia
- Federal subject: Kurgan Oblast
- Founded: 1662
- Town status since: 1781

Government
  - Body: City Duma
  - City Head: Lyudmila Novikova

Area
  - Total: 173.66 km^{2} (67.05 sq mi)
- Elevation: 80 m (260 ft)

Population (2010 Census)
  - Total: 77,756
  - Estimate (2025): 67,067 (−13.7%)
  - Rank: 211th in 2010
  - Density: 447.75/km^{2} (1,159.7/sq mi)

Administrative status
  - Subordinated to: Shadrinsk Town Under Oblast Jurisdiction
  - Capital of: Shadrinsky District, Shadrinsk Town Under Oblast Jurisdiction

Municipal status
  - Urban okrug: Shadrinsk Urban Okrug
  - Capital of: Shadrinsk Urban Okrug, Shadrinsky Municipal District
- Time zone: UTC+5 (MSK+2)
- Postal code: 641870
- Dialing code: +7 35253
- OKTMO ID: 37705000001
- Website: www.shadrinsk-city.ru

Shadrinsk (Russian: Ша́дринск) is a town in Kurgan Oblast, Russia, located on the left bank of the Iset River (Ob's basin) 146 kilometers (91 mi) northwest of Kurgan. Population: 77,756 (2010 census); 80,865 (2002 census); 86,713 (1989 Soviet census).

== History ==
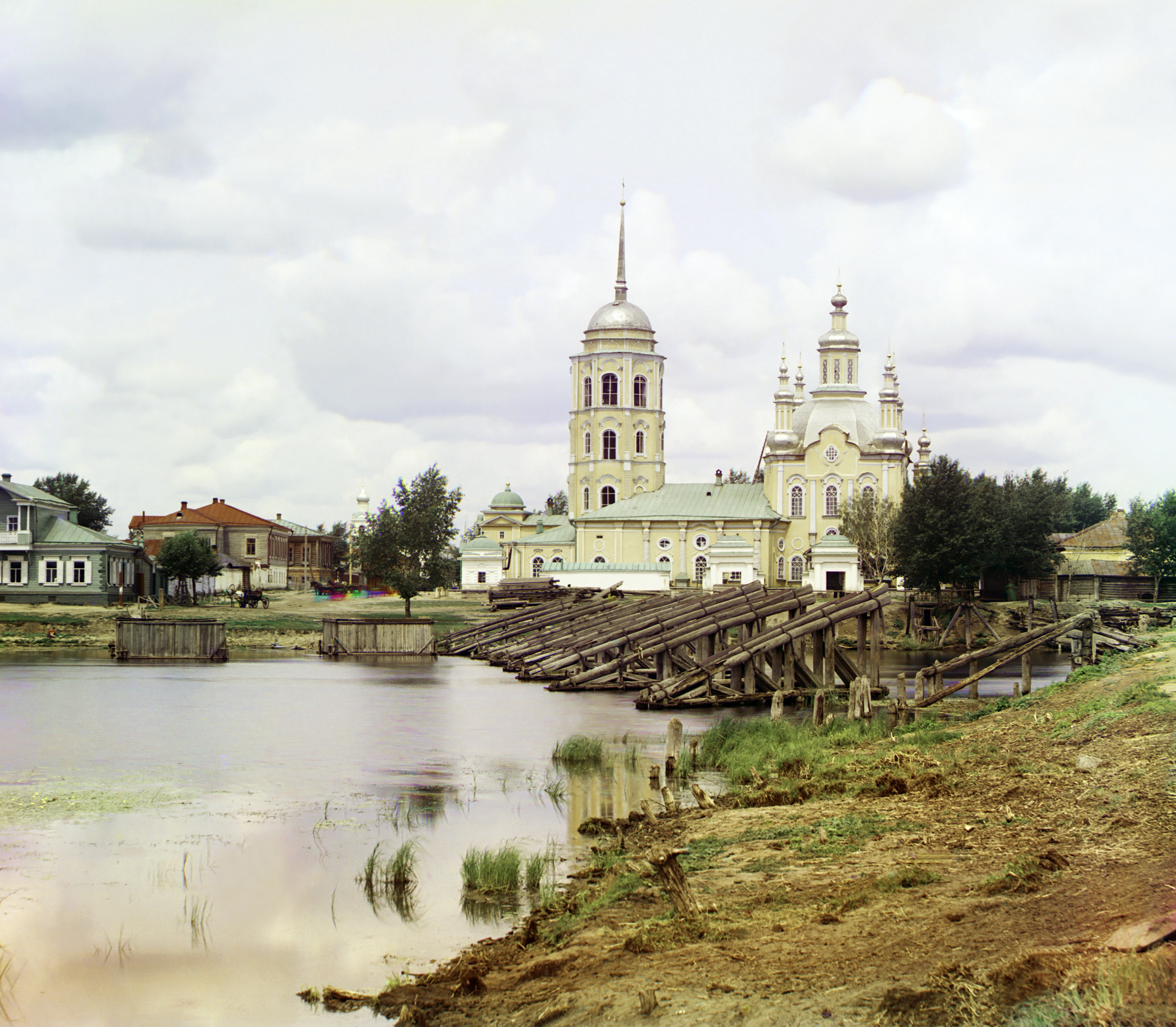
Shadrinsk Cathedral, photographed by Sergey Prokudin-Gorsky

Shadrinsk was founded in 1662 as an agricultural and trade settlement. Shadrinsk hosted the second largest fair in the Urals region. Town status was granted to it from 1712 to 1737 and in 1781. Some Polish insurgents of the January Uprising were exiled in Shadrinsk in the 1860s.

== Administrative and municipal status ==
Within the framework of administrative divisions, Shadrinsk serves as the administrative center of Shadrinsky District, even though it is not a part of it. As an administrative division, it is incorporated separately as Shadrinsk Town Under Oblast Jurisdiction—an administrative unit with a status equal to that of the districts. As a municipal division, Shadrinsk Town Under Oblast Jurisdiction is incorporated as Shadrinsk Urban Okrug.

== Economy ==
There is a hydraulic systems plant (ShAAZ, Shadrinsky Avtoagregatny Zavod) in the town, which manufactures auto parts. The plant is controlled by the Ural Mining Metallurgical Company (UMMC). Another plant is Shadrinsk Milk Canning Plant. It produces dairy products and Shadrinskaya brand mineral water.

== Climate ==
Shadrinsk has a humid continental climate (Köppen climate classification Dfb), with very cold winters and warm summers. The average temperature in January is −14 °C (7 °F), and the record low is −45.2 °C (−49.4 °F). The average temperature in July is 19.3 °C (66.7 °F), and the record high is +40.0 °C (104.0 °F). Precipitation is moderate, but is significantly higher in summer than at other times of the year. In the last 5 years there has been a trend towards hot May and dry August(for about 23 days, the temperature in the town was above 30 degrees!).

Climate data for Shadrinsk
Month	Jan	Feb	Mar	Apr	May	Jun	Jul	Aug	Sep	Oct	Nov	Dec	Year
Record high °C (°F)	7.5 (45.5)	9.0 (48.2)	20.0 (68.0)	30.6 (87.1)	36.1 (97.0)	37.8 (100.0)	40.0 (104.0)	38.3 (100.9)	33.0 (91.4)	23.1 (73.6)	12.1 (53.8)	7.7 (45.9)	40.0 (104.0)
Mean daily maximum °C (°F)	−11.7 (10.9)	−9.6 (14.7)	−1.5 (29.3)	9.7 (49.5)	18.1 (64.6)	23.2 (73.8)	24.7 (76.5)	21.7 (71.1)	15.9 (60.6)	7.0 (44.6)	−3.4 (25.9)	−9.1 (15.6)	7.1 (44.8)
Daily mean °C (°F)	−15.0 (5.0)	−13.8 (7.2)	−5.8 (21.6)	4.8 (40.6)	12.5 (54.5)	17.7 (63.9)	19.3 (66.7)	16.4 (61.5)	10.9 (51.6)	3.2 (37.8)	−6.3 (20.7)	−12.2 (10.0)	2.6 (36.8)
Mean daily minimum °C (°F)	−19.4 (−2.9)	−18.7 (−1.7)	−10.8 (12.6)	−0.5 (31.1)	5.8 (42.4)	11.4 (52.5)	13.6 (56.5)	10.9 (51.6)	5.8 (42.4)	−0.6 (30.9)	−10.0 (14.0)	−16.3 (2.7)	−2.4 (27.7)
Record low °C (°F)	−45.0 (−49.0)	−41.0 (−41.8)	−36.1 (−33.0)	−22.2 (−8.0)	−10.0 (14.0)	−3.9 (25.0)	0.0 (32.0)	−0.2 (31.6)	−8.9 (16.0)	−26.0 (−14.8)	−37.8 (−36.0)	−45.2 (−49.4)	−45.2 (−49.4)
Average precipitation mm (inches)	28.5 (1.12)	19.9 (0.78)	13.8 (0.54)	30.0 (1.18)	53.2 (2.09)	72.5 (2.85)	77.7 (3.06)	56.7 (2.23)	47.5 (1.87)	27.7 (1.09)	29.3 (1.15)	27.0 (1.06)	483.8 (19.02)
Average precipitation days (≥ 0.1 mm)	18.1	12.7	12.7	9.0	10.1	10.3	7.9	10.5	11.6	12.7	17.5	17.4	150.5
Average relative humidity (%)	79.9	76.8	73.5	63.6	58.5	67.3	70.8	73.9	73.6	75.1	80.6	80.1	72.8
Mean monthly sunshine hours	77.5	112.0	176.7	228.0	266.6	294.0	319.3	238.7	174.0	102.3	87.0	58.9	2,135
Source: climatebase.ru

== Military ==
The town is home to Shadrinsk air base which is a minor airlift facility.

== Education ==
Educational facilities include Shadrinsk State Pedagogical university and Shadrinsk Industrial-Pedagogical Technical School.

== Twin cities ==
Twin cities are cities with which twinning agreements have been concluded.

Twin cities

Name	Side	Region	Date	Note
Uchalinsky district	Russia	Bashkortostan	June 7, 2013	
Feodosia	Russia	Republic of Crimea	June 20, 2014	
Abomey-Calavi ( fr. Abomey- Calavi )	Benin	Atlantic Department	May 10, 2017	
Kyzyl-Kiya	Kyrgyzstan	Batken region	June 9, 2022	
