= Shadrinsk Automotive Components =

- Company type: Open Joint Stock Company
- Industry: Automotive
- Founded: 1941; 85 years ago
- Headquarters: Shadrinsk, Russia
- Area served: Russia
- Parent: Ural Mining and Metallurgical Company
- Website: shaaz.ugmk.com

Shadrinsk Automotive Components (Russian: Шадринский автоагрегатный завод) is a Russian automotive component manufacturing company based in Shadrinsk. It is part of the Ural Mining and Metallurgical Company.

The Automotive Components company is a long-time producer of components and accessories for military and civil motor vehicles. For conversion it has been diversifying into products for the home kitchen, for gardeners, and for campers and travelers.
