= Sergey Pantsirev =

Russian poet and translator

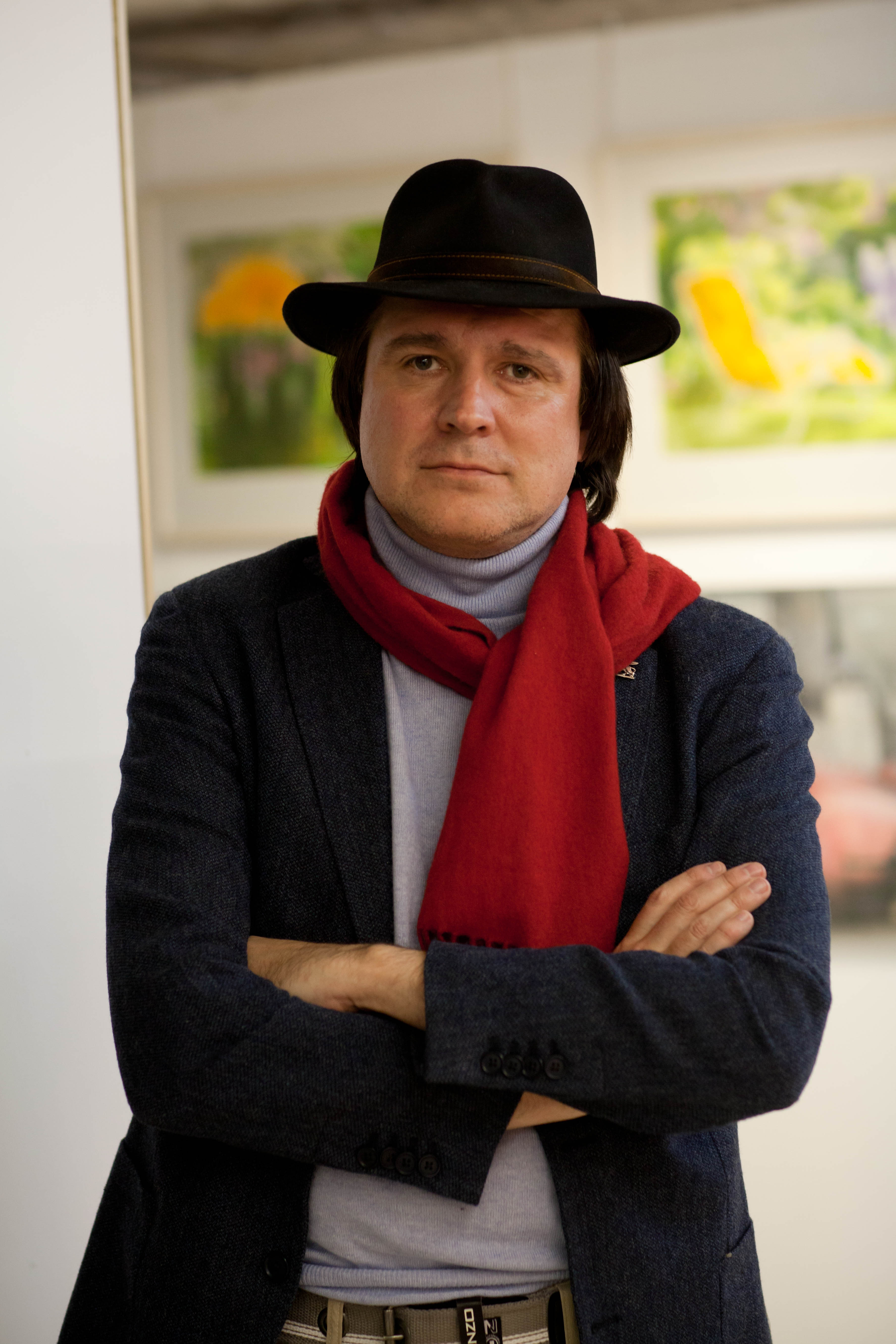
- Born: 30 July 1969 (age 57); Moscow, Soviet Union
- Education: Moscow Power Engineering Institute
- Occupation: Poet / translator
- Years active: 1994–present
- Spouse: Anna Vladi Pantsireva
- Website: pantsirev.com

Sergey Pantsirev (Russian: Сергей Николаевич Панцирев; born July 30, 1969) is a Russian poet and translator.

== Early life and education ==
Pantsirev was born in Moscow and studied at the Moscow Power Engineering Institute, specializing in information technology. Before fully dedicating himself to literature, he worked as an IT manager receiving the Russian National Internet Award in 2002.

== Literary career ==
Pantsirev debuted as a poet in 1994 with his collection Reflections (Рефлексия). His subsequent works, including Present Perfect (Настоящее время, 2004) and Short Waves (Короткие волны, 2021), have received critical acclaim both in his native Russia and in Hungary, where he resided. His poetry has been translated into English, Hungarian, Polish and German. In addition to his original poems, Pantsirev has translated the works of contemporary Hungarian poets, including György Mandics and Judit Vihar, into Russian. He has also translated from Bulgarian and English, contributed to anthologies such as Century After Century and Joseph Brodsky in the Eyes of Contemporaries.

Pantsirev was a part of Hungarian delegation at the UNESCO World Poetry Day Festival in Warsaw in 2022. In 2025 he organized an international poetry festival in Budapest. He was a member of the Moscow Writers' Union and joined the Hungarian PEN Club in 2014.

== Literary themes and style ==
Pantsirev's poetry focuses on themes of identity, time, and human emotions. His poems combine introspective lyricism with a sense of modernity. Critics have noted his ability to connect personal experiences with broader universal themes, using concise imagery and fluid rhythm.

His style has been described as a mix of traditional poetry with modernist experiments, influenced by both Russian literary heritage and worldwide poetic forms, from sonnets and haikus to free verse.

In an interview, he described himself as "a conservative poet," emphasizing that "[in a poem,] the form is no less important than the narrative; the two must be in perfect balance."

== Views and personal life ==
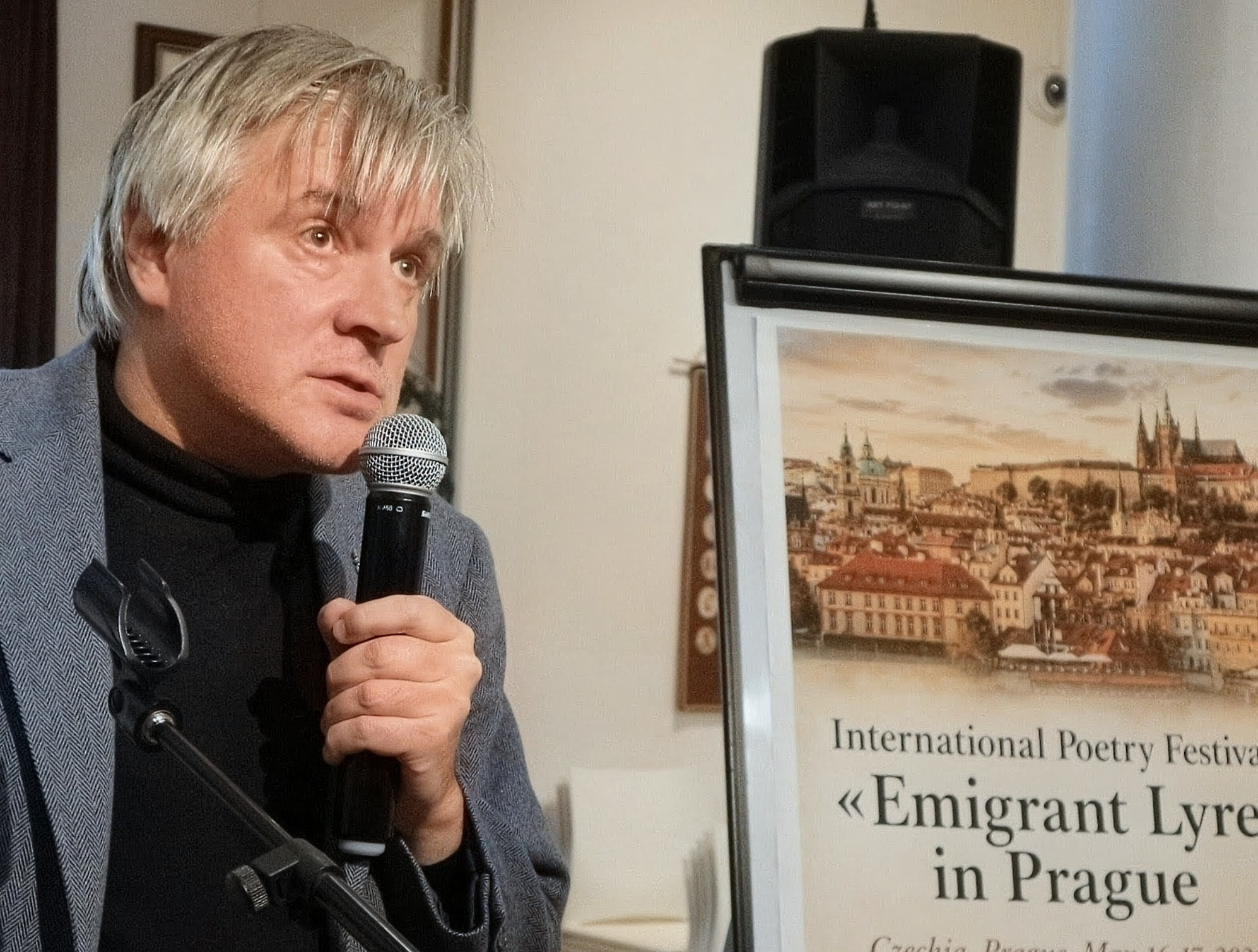
S. Pantsirev at a poetry festival in Prague, 2026

A critic of Vladimir Putin, Pantsirev was a participant of the 2011–2013 Russian protests and emigrated after Russian occupation of Crimea. He has lived in Hungary since 2014. Following the Russian invasion of Ukraine, he maintained a pro-Ukrainian stance.

Pantsirev has no public social media accounts.

His wife, Anna Vladi Pantsireva, is an artist of East Asian ink wash painting.

== Selected works ==
- Reflections («Рефлексия», 1994)
- Present Perfect («Настоящее время», 2004)
- Short Waves (Rövid hullámok, 2021)
- Second Life («Вторая жизнь», 2025)
- Transit, 2025

== Recognition ==
In 2024, Pantsirev was awarded a prize by a Russian émigré poetry magazine, Emigrantskaya Lira, published in Belgium, in 2025 he was a laureate of the international literary competition "Khizhitsy".
