= Shadrinsky District =

District in Kurgan Oblast, Russia

Shadrinsky District Шадринский район (Russian)
- District
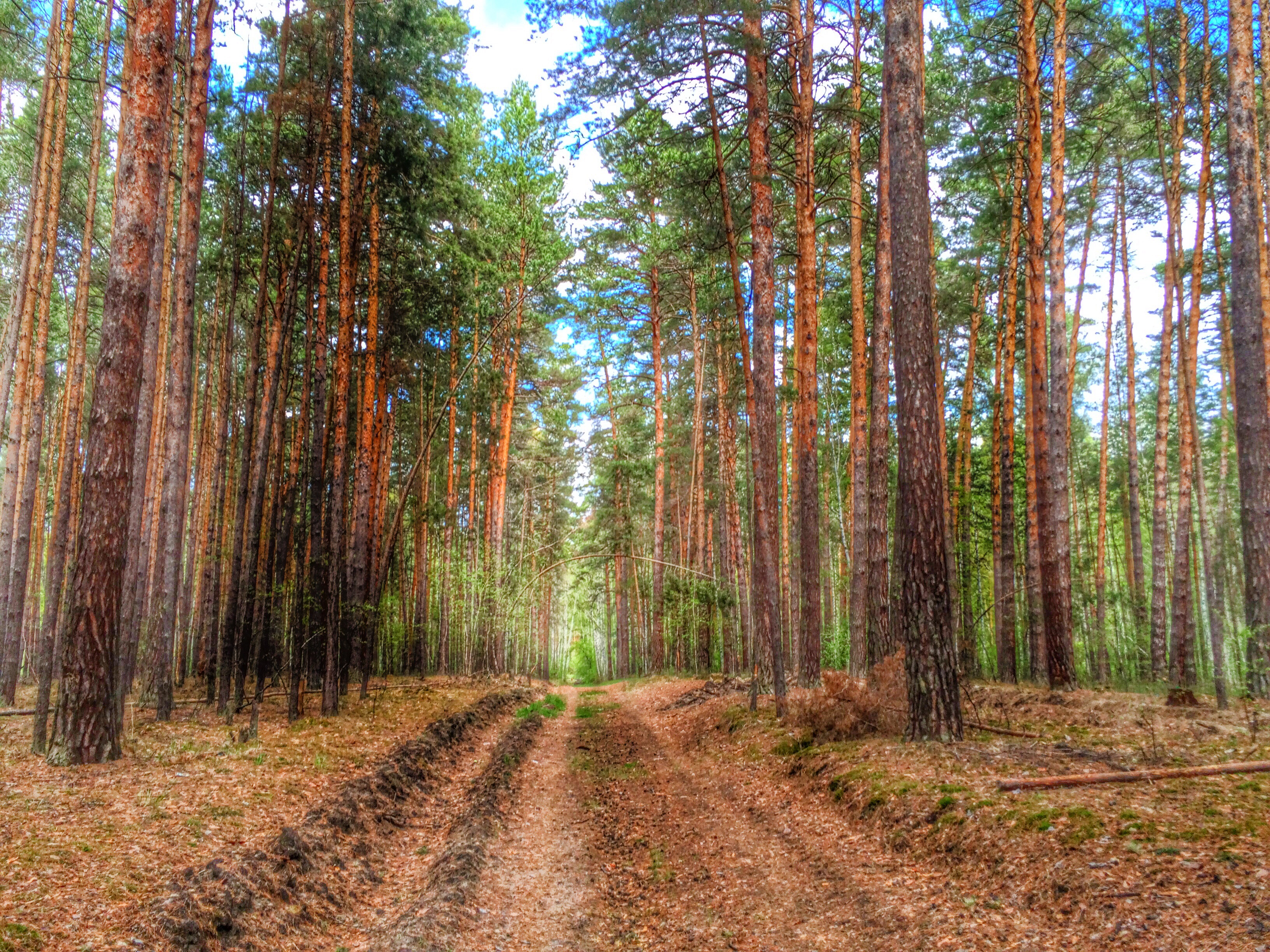
- Mylnikovsky forest, Shadrinsky District

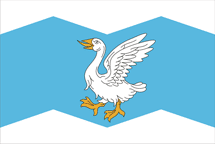
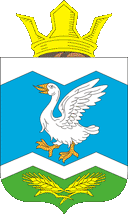
- Flag Coat of arms
- Location of Shadrinsky District in Kurgan Oblast
- Coordinates: 56°05′N 63°38′E
- Country: Russia
- Federal subject: Kurgan Oblast
- Established: 1924
- Administrative center: Shadrinsk

Area
  - Total: 4,100 km^{2} (1,600 sq mi)

Population (2010 Census)
  - Total: 27,360
  - Density: 6.7/km^{2} (17/sq mi)
  - Urban: 0%
  - Rural: 100%

Administrative structure
  - Administrative divisions: 35 selsoviet
  - Inhabited localities: 92 rural localities

Municipal structure
  - Municipally incorporated as: Shadrinsky Municipal District
  - Municipal divisions: 0 urban settlements, 35 rural settlements
- Time zone: UTC+5 (MSK+2)
- OKTMO ID: 37638000
- Website: http://raion.shadrinsk.net/

Shadrinsky District (Russian: Шадринский райо́н) is an administrative and municipal district (raion), one of the twenty-four in Kurgan Oblast, Russia. It is located in the northwest of the oblast. The area of the district is 4,100 square kilometers (1,600 sq mi). Its administrative center is the town of Shadrinsk (which is not administratively a part of the district). Population: 27,360 (2010 census); 33,331 (2002 Census); 35,256 (1989 Soviet census).

== Administrative and municipal status ==
Within the framework of administrative divisions, Shadrinsky District is one of the twenty-four in the oblast. The town of Shadrinsk serves as its administrative center, despite being incorporated separately as a town under oblast jurisdiction—an administrative unit with the status equal to that of the districts.

As a municipal division, the district is incorporated as Shadrinsky Municipal District. Shadrinsk Town Under Oblast Jurisdiction is incorporated separately from the district as Shadrinsk Urban Okrug.
