= Military Educational and Scientific Center =

Russian Armed Forces Institution of Higher Learning

A Military Educational and Scientific Center (MESC) (Russian: Военный учебно-научный центр - ВУНЦ) is a type of military institution in the Russian Armed Forces. The institutions were established in the 2000s to amalgamate multiple military academies and schools. Approximately one MESC was planned for each branch of the armed forces (air force, army, navy, etc.). A total of about ten MESCs were established.

One example is the Russian Air Force MESC Zhukovsky – Gagarin Air Force Academy. This MESC was based on the amalgamation of two previously independent academies: Zhukovsky Air Force Engineering Academy and Gagarin Air Force Academy. Up to ten military flight colleges were included in this MESC as affiliated entities.
