= Zhukovsky Air Force Engineering Academy =

Russian Air Force engineering academy

- Военно-воздушная инженерная академия имени профессора Н. Е. Жуковского
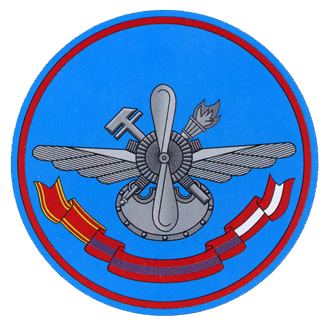
- Zhukovsky Air Force Engineering Academy Sleeve insignia
- Type: Military academies in Russia
- Established: 23 November 1920
- Location: Moscow, and Monino, Moscow Region, Russian Federation; 55°47′37″N 37°33′09″E
- Demonym: Zhukovka

Zhukovsky Air Force Engineering Academy (Военно-воздушная инженерная академия имени профессора Н. Е. Жуковского) – is a higher military educational institution for training and retraining of engineers for the Russian Aerospace Forces.

The academy trains specialists – engineers, research engineers in the following specialties:

- Technical maintenance of aircraft and engines
- Robotic aircraft armament system
- Electronics and automation of physical systems
- Technical maintenance of aircraft electrical systems and flight control and navigation systems
- Software of computers and automated systems
- Metrology and metrological support
- Technical operation of the transport of radio equipment
- Electronic warfare
- The study of natural resources by means of aerospace

== Organizational structure ==
The academy has the main campus in Moscow, and training centers in Monino, Noginsk and Kashira.

=== Faculties and schools ===
- No. 1 – aircraft
- No. 2 – aircraft armament
- No. 3 – aircraft equipment
- No. 4 – aviation electronic equipment
- No. 5 – training of foreign specialists
- No. 6 – basic training

== History ==
Through its 90-year history the academy has undergone many reorganizations and name changes. The list below is not complete.

=== The Moscow Aviation College ===
The academy traces its history back to the Moscow Aviation College which was created on the initiative of Professor Zhukovsky in 1919.

=== Institute of Engineers of the Red Air Fleet ===
On 26 September 1920 the Revolutionary Military Council has issued an order number 1946, which reorganized The Moscow Aviation College into the Zhukovsky Red Air Fleet Institute of Engineers.

=== Air Force Academy named after Zhukovsky ===
On September 9, 1922, the academy was renamed into Air Force Academy named after N.E. Zhukovsky. In the summer of 1923, the academy moved to the Petrovsky Palace. In March 1940 the command, navigator, operational departments were separated into a new Gagarin Air Force Academy. Since 1940, the academy has prepared only the engineering staff for the Air Force.

=== Recent developments ===
In 2008, the academy was amalgamated with the Gagarin Air Force Academy to form a joint Zhukovsky – Gagarin Air Force Academy. The full name of the new academy is Russian Air Force Military Educational and Scientific Center “Air Force Academy named after Professor N.E. Zhukovsky and Y.A. Gagarin”.

For further history of the academy see the article on the Zhukovsky – Gagarin Air Force Academy.

== Chiefs of the academy ==
The following have served as chiefs of the academy:

- 1922—1923 — Alexander Vegener Russian: ru:Вегенер, Александр Николаевич
- 1924—1925 — Nikolai Sollogub
- 1925—1927 — Vladimir Lazarevich Russian: ru:Лазаревич, Владимир Саламанович
- 1927—1933 — Sergey Horkov Russian: ru:Хорьков, Сергей Григорьевич
- 1934—1936 — Alexander Todorsky
- 1936—1940 — Zinoviy Pomerantsev Russian: ru:Померанцев, Зиновий Максимович
- 1940—1941 — Nikolay Sokolov-Sokolenok Russian: ru:Соколов-Соколёнок, Николай Александрович
- 1941—1942 — Stepan Hadeev Russian: ru:Хадеев, Степан Петрович
- 1942—1947 — Nikolay Sokolov-Sokolenok Russian: ru:Соколов-Соколёнок, Николай Александрович
- 1947—1969 — Vladimir Volkov Russian: Волков, Владимир Иванович
- 1969—1973 — Nikolay Fedayev Russian: ru:Федяев, Николай Максимович
- 1973—1986 — Vasiliy Filippov Russian: ru:Филиппов, Василий Васильевич
- 1986—1992 — Vitaliy Kremlev Russian: ru:Кремлёв, Виталий Яковлевич
- 1992—2002 — Vladimir Kovalyonok
- с 2002 — Anatoly Maksimov Russian: ru:Максимов, Анатолий Николаевич

== Notable faculty ==
- Irina Grekova
- Jügderdemidiin Gürragchaa
- Germogen Pospelov

== Notable graduates ==
Among the academy graduates 865 were awarded the title Hero of the Soviet Union, 61 twice, and Air Marshal Ivan Kozhedub this title was given three times, 89 people became laureates of the Lenin and State prizes. Among the graduates of academy – the first cosmonaut Yuri Gagarin, the first woman-cosmonaut Valentina Tereshkova, the first man to walk in space Alexei Leonov, marshal of aviation Sergei Khudyakov, the famous aircraft designers Sergei Ilyushin, Artem Mikoyan and Alexander Sergeyevich Yakovlev.

== See also ==
- Zhukovsky Academy page at the official site of the Russian Ministry of Defence. Раздел ВВИА на сайте Министерства обороны РФ.
- Zhukovsky Academy official site Сайт, посвящённый ВВИА имени профессора Н. Е. Жуковского и ее выпускникам.
- Zhukovsky Academy community site Сообщество ВВИА в «Живом журнале».
- Zhukovsky Academy graduates forum Форум выпускников академии.
- Zhukovsky Academy First Faculty graduates forum Сайт выпускников академии 1 факультет 2004 г.в.
