= Shadrinsk (air base) =

Former Air base in Russia

Shadrinsk
- Shadrinsk, Kurgan Oblast in Russia

Site information
- Type: Air Base
- Owner: Ministry of Defence
- Operator: Russian Air Force

Location
- Shown within Kurgan Oblast Shadrinsk (Russia)
- Coordinates: 56°2′12″N 063°40′18″E

Site history
- Built: 1992
- In use: 1992 -1998

Airfield information
- Identifiers: ICAO: XSCD
- Elevation: 140 metres (459 ft) AMSL
Runways
Direction	Length and surface
08/26	2,500 metres (8,202 ft) Concrete

Shadrinsk (also Sadrinsk) is a former air base in Russia located 6 km southeast of Shadrinsk. It was home to 600th Military-Transport Aviation Regiment (military unit 78684) using the Ilyushin Il-76 aircraft between 1992 and 1998 as part of the 18th Guards Military-Transport Aviation Division.

In 1998, the 600th Military-Transport Aviation Regiment was disbanded; in the late 1990s, the airfield was abandoned and the concrete runway was dismantled.
