= Sitskoye =

Sitskoye Ситское
- Selo
- Location within Vologda Oblast Location within Russia
- Coordinates: 59°50′N 38°50′E
- Country: Russia
- Region: Vologda Oblast
- District: Kirillovsky District
- Time zone: UTC+3:00

Sitskoye (Russian: Ситское) is a rural locality (a selo) in Nikolotorzhskoye Rural Settlement, Kirillovsky District, Vologda Oblast, Russia. The population was 14 as of 2002.

== Geography ==
Sitskoye is located 36 km southeast of Kirillov (the district's administrative centre) by road. Zarechye is the nearest rural locality.
