= Zhukovsky – Gagarin Air Force Academy =

Russian military school in Voronezh

- Russian: Военно-воздушная академия им. профессора Н.Е. Жуковского и Ю.А. Гагарина
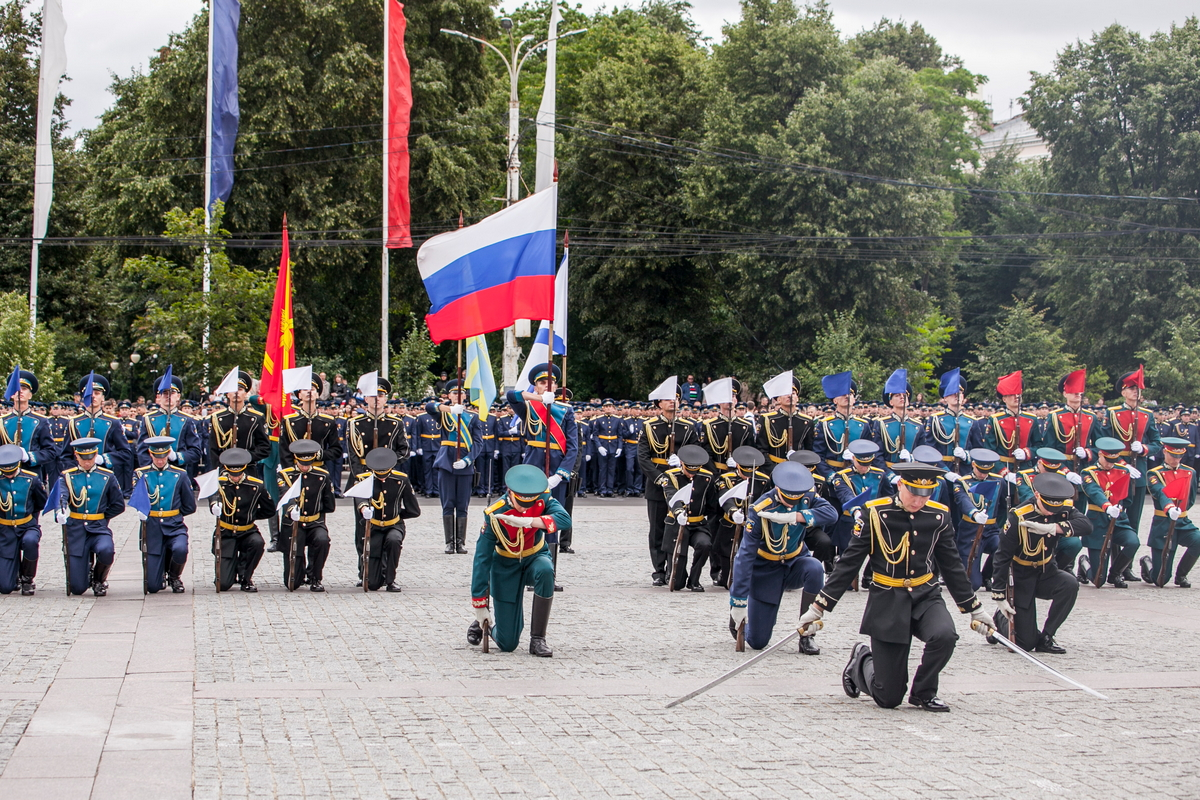
- Release of officers of the Air force Academy in Voronezh, June 2019
- Type: Military Academy for Aviation
- Established: 1920 (2012 in current form)
- Principal: Gennady Zibrov
- Students: 12,000
- Location: Voronezh, Russia; 51.63839°N 39.18216°E
- Website: vva.mil.ru

The Zhukovsky – Gagarin Air Force Academy is a Russian military institution of higher education run by the Russian Aerospace Forces. The full name is Russian Air Force Military Educational and Scientific Center Air Force Academy Professor N.E. Zhukovsky and Major Y.A. Gagarin based in Voronezh, Voronezh Oblast in southern Russia.

== History ==
=== Roots ===
The ancestor of the current academy is considered to be the Military Aerodrome Technical School of the Air Force in Stalingrad, the decision to open which was made at the end of 1948 by the General Staff of the Armed Forces of the USSR, and the opening took place on January 1, 1950.

In 1954, the school was relocated to the city of Michurinsk, Tambov Region (Voronezh Military District). In 1963, the educational institution was renamed the Michurinsk Military Aviation Technical School, and a few months later it moved to Voronezh and received a new name, Voronezh Military Aviation Technical School.

In 1998, the school was transformed into the Voronezh Military Aviation Engineering Institute, and five years later it received a new name - the Voronezh Higher Military Aviation Engineering School (Military Institute).

In August 2006, the Voronezh Higher Military Engineering School of Radio Electronics (Russian: Воронежское высшее военное инженерное училище радиоэлектроники) was incorporated to the school.

=== Zhukovsky - Gagarin Academy in Moscow ===
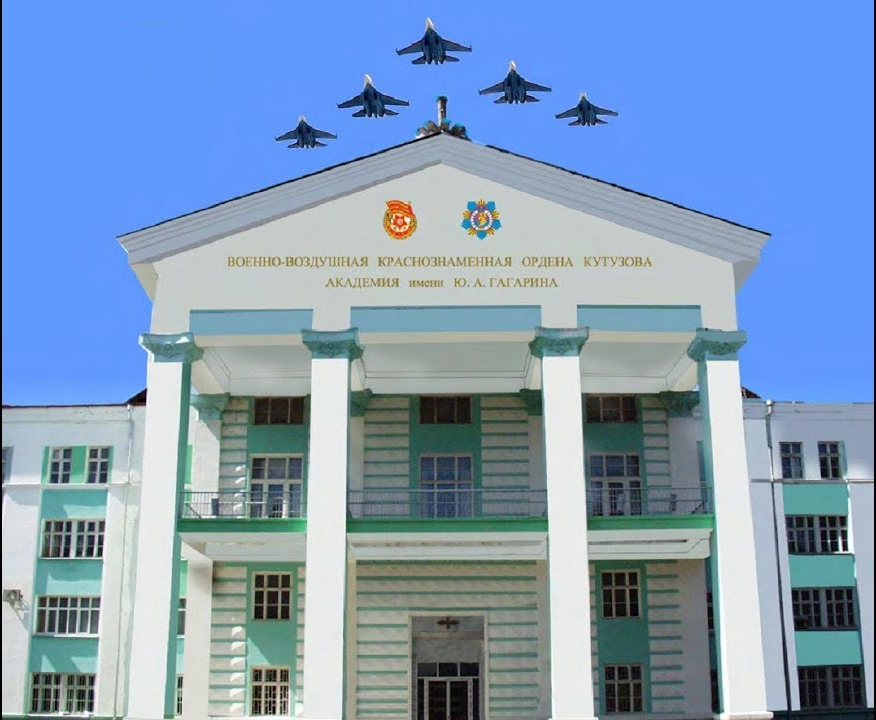
The building of the Yu.A. Gagarin in the village of Monino, Moscow region

The Academy was established in 2008 after the merger of the Zhukovsky Air Force Engineering Academy and the Gagarin Air Force Academy by Government Resolution on March 7, 2008. The Gagarin Academy specialized in preparing high-ranking commanding officers, while the Zhukovsky Academy focused on aviation engineering. The number of military and civilian personnel in the new academy was limited to 4,614 and both campuses were retained (Zhukovsky in Moscow and Gagarin in Monino, 38 km (24 mi) east of Moscow), but it was envisioned that the new Academy would fully relocate to Monino by the end of 2011.

In 2008-2009, when the Ministry of Defence continued the process of consolidation of its training and research institutions, six other military schools were named affiliated (separate organizational units) entities and later subsidiaries of the academy:

- Eisk Higher Military Aviation School (named after twice Hero of the Soviet Union, pilot-cosmonaut V. M. Komarov)
- Krasnodar Higher Military Aviation School (named after Hero of the Soviet Union A. K. Serov)
- Syzran Higher Military Aviation School
- Saint Petersburg Higher Military School of Radioelectronics
- Chelyabinsk Red Banner Military Aviation Institute of Navigators
- Yaroslavl Higher Military School of Anti-Aircraft Warfare

The total number of employees (military and civilian personnel) of the academy (with subsidiaries) was set at 37,481 people.

The academy offered programs in a variety of fields:

- Command and control of military units and formations
- The study of natural resources by means of aerospace
- Electronics and automation of physical facilities
- Robotic systems of aircraft weapons
- Technical maintenance of aircraft and engines
- Technical maintenance of aircraft electrical systems and flight control and navigation systems
- Technical maintenance of the mobile radio equipment
- Metrology and metrological support
- Means of electronic warfare
- The software of computers and automated systems

=== Merger ===
Order of the Russian Minister of Defence on 12 July 2011, a decision was made to reform the academy. It directed to transfer within 45 days (until September 1, 2011), "the preparation of students from the Zhukovsky – Gagarin Air Force Academy (Moscow and Monino) to the Military Aviation Engineering University" located in Voronezh.

The same order liquidated subsidiaries of the academy in the cities of Yeysk (Krasnodar Krai), Saint Petersburg and Chelyabinsk.

De jure, the order has not eliminated Zhukovsky – Gagarin Air Force Academy. However, it happened de facto, since the educational activities were the main purpose of the academy, and the transfer of preparation of students to the Military Aviation Engineering University (Voronezh) in practice meant an end to the existence of the Zhukovsky – Gagarin Air Force Academy.

The vast majority of the Zhukovsky – Gagarin Air Force Academy faculty did not move to Voronezh. More than fifteen hundred people were laid off in Monino. Order of the Ministry of Defence has caused fierce criticism from the scientific and pedagogical community of the academy. Exponent of this position is the head of the working group of the Academic Council of the academy Ivan Naidenov (Lieutenant General of aviation, retired, a former deputy chief of the Gagarin Academy for Education and Science, Doctor of Military Sciences, Professor, Honored Scientist of Russia, and earlier - Head of the Russian Air Force Research Center for the Command and Control Systems (ru:Научно-исследовательский центр систем управления ВВС) a part of the 30th Central Scientific Research Institute, Ministry of Defence (Russia).

The need for reorganization of the Russian Air Force research and educational institutions has been realized at all levels of military establishment since the late 1980s. Options discussed included the reorganization and different forms of association of Zhukovsky Air Force Engineering Academy and Gagarin Air Force Academy, and sometimes 30th Central Scientific Research Institute. The criteria for the effectiveness of the reforms were not only the reductions in personnel and budget, but also sustainment of the scientific and pedagogical potential of research and educational institutions. According to Ivan Naidenov, the reform of 2011 resulted in almost complete loss of the Zhukovsky – Gagarin Air Force Academy potential, and restoration of the lost positions in the Military Aviation Engineering University (Voronezh) will take at least 10 – 15 years.

At the end of September 2011, when implementation of the Defence Ministry Order №1136 was in full swing (academy equipment was transported to Voronezh, employees at the academy in Monino were laid off), Government Resolution of September 27, 2011 № 1639-r was issued. This resolution ordered the creation of Federal State Governmental military educational institution of higher education Zhukovsky – Gagarin Air Force Academy of the Defense Ministry "by changing the type of the existing" federal state of military educational institutions of higher education Zhukovsky – Gagarin Air Force Academy, while maintaining its main purpose of activity and total number of full-time employees.

In 2010, the Federal State Research and Testing Center for Electronic Warfare and Evaluation of the Efficiency of Visibility Reduction was attached to the University. On September 1, 2011, by order of the Ministry of Defense of the Russian Federation, the university received the training of trained officers of the operational-tactical level from the Air Force Academy named after Professor Zhukovsky and Gagarin.

On February 21, 2020, the Russian Minister of Defense, General of the Army Sergey Shoygu, presented the Academy with the Order of Zhukov for merits in strengthening the country's defense capability and training qualified military personnel.

== Structure ==
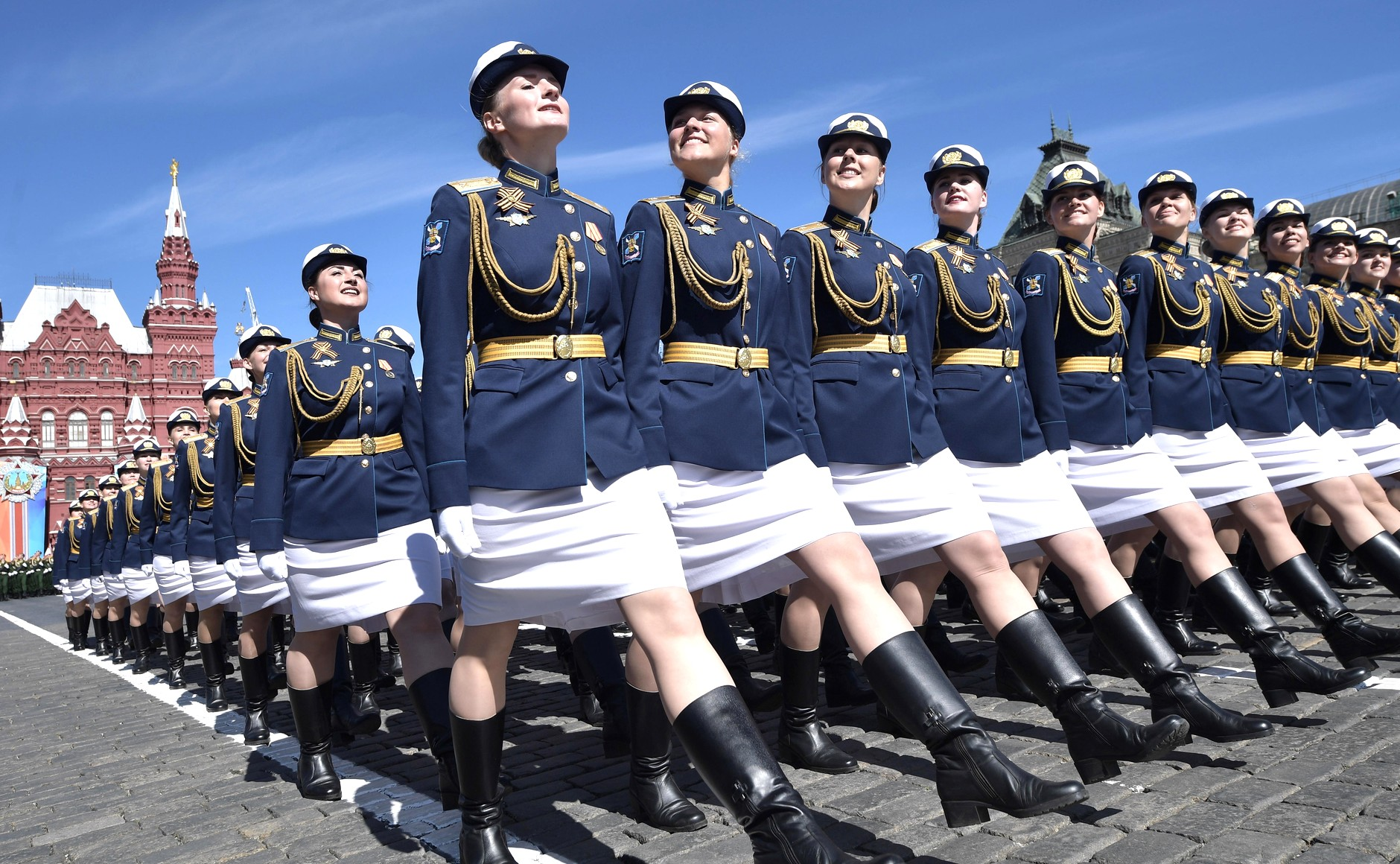
Female cadets from the academy on parade.

=== Faculties and branches ===
- Command
- Faculty of Aviation Support
- Hydrometeorological Faculty
- Faculty of Aerodrome Technical Support of Aviation
- Faculty of Engineering and Airfield Support
- Faculty of Unmanned Aircraft
- Faculty of Electronic Warfare (and Information Security)
- Faculty of Aircraft
- Faculty of Aviation Arms
- Faculty of Aviation Equipment
- Faculty of Aviation Radioelectronic Equipment
- Faculty of Radio Engineering
- Faculty of Aviation Communications
- Faculty of Retraining and Continuing Education
- Special Faculty
- Syzran Higher Military Aviation School (branch of the Academy)
- Chelyabinsk Red Banner Military Aviation Institute of Navigators (branch of the Academy)
  - Navigator Training Faculty
  - Faculty of Combat Aviation and Air Traffic Control

=== Academy band ===
The history of the cadet band began in 1936, when the Chelyabinsk Higher Military Aviation School of Navigators was created. Major I. Vasilyev was its first director and laid the glorious traditions of performing art and musical culture. The band is a laureate of more than one competition of military bands of the Volga-Ural Military District. As part of the consolidated band of the Central Military District, as part of the festival of military bands, it is included in the Guinness Book of Records as a member of the largest orchestra performing the FIFA Anthem. The band takes part in all the ceremonies and military parades held in the city of Chelyabinsk, dedicated to the Victory in the Great Patriotic War.

== See also ==
- United States Air Force Academy
- Royal Canadian Air Force Academy
- École de l'air
- PLA Air Force Aviation University
- Royal Air Force College
- Gagarin Air Force Academy
- Zhukovsky Air Force Engineering Academy
