= Moscow Power Engineering Institute =

Public university in Russia

Coordinates: 55°45′17″N 37°42′30″E

National Research University "Moscow Power Engineering Institute"
- Московский энергетический институт
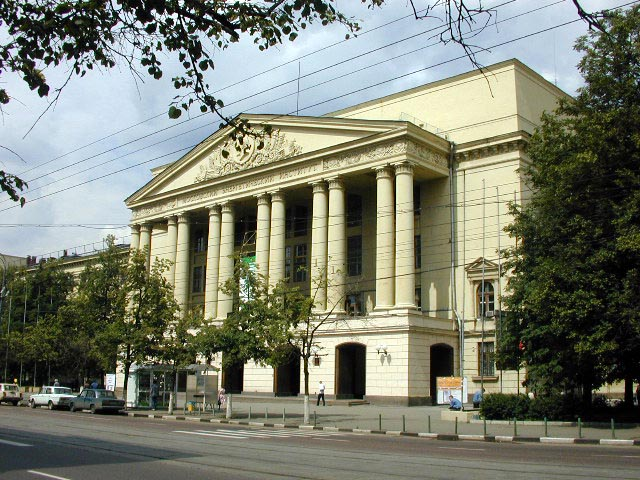
- Motto: Energia omnium fundamentum (Энергия — основа всего)
- Type: Public
- Established: 1930
- Rector: Nikolay Rogalev
- Students: ca. 20,000
- Location: Moscow, Russia
- Website: www.mpei.ru

University rankings

Regional – Overall
- QS Emerging Europe and Central Asia: 163 (2022)

National Research University "Moscow Power Engineering Institute" (MPEI; Russian: Московский энергетический институт, romanized: Moskovskiy energeticheskiy institut) is a public university based in Moscow, Russia. It offers training in the fields of Power Engineering, Electric Engineering, Radio Engineering, Electronics, Information Technologies and Management.

== History ==
MPEI was founded in 1930. In 2011 it obtained the status of National Research University. Therefore, the new official name is National Research University Moscow Power Engineering Institute.

== About MPEI ==
At MPEI there are 12 Institutes, 65 departments, 176 scientific laboratories, research construction bureau and test factory, educational TPP, Solar Power Plant, technical library, stadium "Energia", palace of culture and a swimming pool.

Among the teaching staff there are 7 Academicians of RAS, 262 Science Doctors, 715 Philosophy Doctors.

The Study Campus is in Moscow Lefortovo district. The dormitories for students, health center, canteens, cafes are at the Campus at the Energeticheskaya, Lapina, 1st Sininchkina streets and Energeticheskiy passway. The newspaper Power Engineer, the Radio MPEI and the MPEI TV are all part of students' cultural ambience.

== Student life at MPEI ==
Standard student's scholarship is about 2,000 rubles. The study week consists of 6 working days. In the first years' vacation time students can participate in the construction camp work and in the senior years practice work at the enterprises is compulsory.

== Teaching international students ==
Foreigners, starting from the 1950s, were entering MPEI without entrance exams. In order to raise their Russian knowledge level, MPEI organized pre-university training courses. Students from 70 countries study at the university.

== Cooperation ==
MPEI is a member of international associations.

== Institutes within the university ==
- Institute of Power Machinery and Mechanics
- Institute of Thermal and Nuclear Power Engineering
- Institute of Energy Efficiency and Hydrogen Technologies
- Institute of Electrical Engineering
- Institute of Electrical Power Engineering
- Institute of Information Technologies and Computer Science
- Institute of Radio Engineering and Electronics
- Institute of Humanities and Applied Sciences
- Engineering-Economic Institute
- Institute of Remote and Additional Education
- Institute of Electronics and Nano Electronics
- Institute of Hydropower and Renewable Energy
- Military Engineering Institute

More information is available on the university website: www.mpei.ru

== Notable alumni ==
- Aleksandr Akimov, chief supervisor of Reactor 4 during the Chernobyl disaster
- Roman Avdeev, Russian businessman, investor, and philanthropist. Owner of Credit Bank of Moscow
- Alexei Bogomolov, radio engineer, Hero of Socialist Labour, Lenin Prize, USSR State Prize
- Nikolay Brusentsov, chief designer of Setun, honoured researcher in Moscow State University
- Alexander Feldbaum, Soviet scientist in the field of automatic control and fundamental computer science
- Vladimir Holstinin, Russian musician, a co-founder of the band called Aria
- Ion Iliescu, 8th president of Romania
- Laura Irasuegi Otal, Niños de Rusia, civil engineer
- Vsevolod Kukushkin, Russian journalist, writer and ice hockey administrator
- Yan Luguang, Chinese electrical engineer, created China's first tokamak device
- Sergey Pantsirev, Russian poet
- M. P. Parameswaran, Indian nuclear engineer, writer and educationist
- Victor Pelevin, Russian fiction writer
- Li Peng, 4th premier of China
- Araceli Sánchez Urquijo, Niños de Rusia and the first woman to work as a civil engineer in Spain
- King Steve Benjamin, musician
- Serik Zhumangarin, Kazakh politician
- Germogen Pospelov
